= Chinese people in Korea =

Regions with significant populations
- North Korea: Chongjin, Pyongyang, Sinuiju; South Korea: Busan, Incheon, Seoul
- North Korea: 10,000 (2009)
- South Korea: 849,804 (2022)

Languages
- Chinese (Shanghainese, Mandarin), Korean

Religion
- Chinese folk religion, Taoism, Buddhism, I-Kuan Tao, and Christianity

A recognizable community of Chinese people in Korea has existed since the 1880s, and are often known as Hwagyo. Over 90% of early Chinese migrants came from Shandong province on the east coast of China. These ethnic Han Chinese residents in Korea often held Republic of China and Korean citizenship. The Republic of China used to govern the entirety of China, but now only governs Taiwan and a minor part of Fujian province. Due to the conflation of Republic of China citizenship with Taiwanese identity in the modern era, these ethnic Chinese people in Korea or Hwagyo are now usually referred to as "Taiwanese". However, in reality most Hwagyo hold little to no ties with Taiwan.

After China's reform and opening up and subsequent normalization of China–South Korea relations, a new wave of Chinese migration to South Korea has occurred. In 2009, more than half of the South Korea's 1.1 million foreign residents were PRC citizens; 71% of those are Joseonjok (Chaoxianzu in Korea), PRC citizens of Korean ethnicity. There is also a small community of PRC citizens in North Korea.

Between 2018 and 2020, the presence of Chinese (Han Chinese) workers was felt more than ethnic Korean-Chinese workers, as evidenced by the noticeable increase in conversations in Mandarin. In 2023, Chaoxianzu, the Korean-Chinese community in South Korea, including those with Korean nationality, numbers over 800,000, roughly half of the entire ethnic Korean population in China. With the increase in permanent residency and nationality acquisition, it appears that there is a trend of settling and establishing roots in South Korea.

== Terminology ==
Chinese people in Korea
- Traditional Chinese: 韓國華僑, 旅韓華僑
- Simplified Chinese: 韩国华侨, 旅韩华侨
Transcriptions
Standard Mandarin
- Hanyu Pinyin: Hánguó Huáqiáo, Lǚhán Huáqiáo

South Korean name
- Hangul: 한국화교, 재한중국인
- Hanja: 韓國華僑, 在韓中國人
Transcriptions
- Revised Romanization: Hanguk Hwagyo, Jaehan Junggugin
- McCune–Reischauer: Han'guk Hwagyo, Chaehan Chunggugin

North Korean name
- Chosŏn'gŭl: 조선화교, 재조선중국인
- Hancha: 朝鮮華僑, 在朝鮮中國人
Transcriptions
- Revised Romanization: Joseon Hwagyo, Jaejoseon Chunggugin
- McCune–Reischauer: Chosŏn Hwagyo, Chaejosŏn Chunggugin

When writing in English, scholars use a number of different terms to refer to Chinese people in Korea, derived from Sino-Korean vocabulary but use different expressions for two languages. One common one is hanguk hwagyo (Korean) or lühan huaqiao (Mandarin), meaning "Chinese staying in Korea". The Korean reading is often shortened to hwagyo (also spelled huakyo), which simply means "overseas Chinese" but in English literature typically refers specifically to the overseas Chinese of Korea. Other authors call them huaqiao, but this term might be used to refer to overseas Chinese in any country, not just Korea, so sometimes a qualifier is added, for example "Korean-Huaqiao". The terms "Chinese Korean" and "Korean Chinese" are also seen. However, this usage may be confused with Koreans in China, who are also referred to by both such names.

== Overview ==
According to Niigata Sangyo University Professor Jin Guanlin, "It can be said that from the end of the Chinese Warring States period to the Northern and Southern Dynasties, many Chinese moved to Manchuria and the Korean peninsula, blended among the indigenous people, and over time forgot about their Chinese origins." Many scholars came from China during the Western and Eastern Jin, Northern and Southern dynasties, Sui, and Tang periods. Large-scale immigration from China diminished greatly during the Later Silla period, but resumed during the Goryeo period by people escaping turmoil in China. Many northern Chinese fled to Korea during the transition period between Yuan and Ming. There was little immigration from China during the first half of the Joseon period, but many Han Chinese settled in Korea during the Imjin War as well as during the fall of Ming. Many scholars came from the Ming to escape the Qing during the 17th century.

== History ==
=== Early history ===
According to traditional Korean historiography of the Samguk Sagi, the mythical Chinese sage Jizi came to Korea during the Shang dynasty and established the semi-legendary Gija Joseon in the 11th century BCE. Later in the 3rd century BCE, Wiman of Gojoseon from the state of Yan fled to Korea after he was defeated by forces from the Han Dynasty after he rebelled against the Han dynasty. Wiman later overthrew Jun of Gojoseon and established Wiman Joseon. Chinese colonists settled in the Four Commanderies of Han after the Han dynasty conquered Wiman Joseon, especially in Lelang Commandery. Ethnic Han colonies peasants were set up at Lelang.

Fleeing from the Mongols, in 1216 the Khitans invaded Goryeo and defeated the Korean armies multiple times, even reaching the gates of the capital and raiding deep into the south, but were defeated by Korean General Kim Chwi-ryeo who pushed them back north to Pyongan, where the remaining Khitans were finished off by allied Mongol-Goryeo forces in 1219. These Khitans are possibly the origin of the Baekjeong.

Xianbei descendants among the Korean population carry surnames such as Mo (Korean: 모; Chinese: 慕 (Note: pinyin: mù; Wade–Giles: mu, shortened from Murong)), Seok Sŏk Sek (석; 石 (Note: pinyin: shí; Wade–Giles: shih, shortened from Wushilan (Chinese: 烏石蘭))), Won Wŏn (원; 元 (Note: pinyin: yuán; Wade–Giles: yüan. This is the adopted Chinese surname of the Tuoba)), Dokgo (Chinese: 獨孤 (Note: pinyin: Dúgū; Wade–Giles: Tuku, from the Chinese Dugu)).

During the Yuan dynasty, one of Confucius' descendants, who was one of the sons of Duke Yansheng Kong Huan, named Kong Shao (孔紹), moved from China to Goryeo era Korea and established a branch of the family there called the Gong clan of Qufu after marrying a Korean woman, the daughter of Jo Jin-gyeong (曹晉慶) during Toghon Temür's rule. This branch of the family received aristocratic rank in Joseon era Korea. 曲阜孔氏 (朝鮮半島) 곡부 공씨

Two Japanese families, a Vietnamese family, an Arab family, a Uighur family, four Manchuria originated families, three Mongol families, and 83 Chinese families migrated into Korea during Goryeo.

Goryeo era Korea accepted Lý dynasty of Vietnam as royal refugees. The Lý familial origins were from south China. Fujian province, Jinjiang village, was the origin of Lý Thái Tổ (李公蘊), the ancestor of the Lý dynasty ruling family and Lý Công Uẩn. These sources have been confirmed by Trần Quốc Vượng.

Chen Li, who was the second and the last emperor of the Chinese Chen Han dynasty settled in Korea after he had surrendered his state to the Ming Dynasty. Chen's became the progenitor of the Yangsan Jin clan. The Chinese Ming Xia emperor Ming Yuzhen's son Ming Sheng was given the noble title Marquis of Guiyi by the Ming dynasty emperor Zhu Yuanzhang after his surrender. Ming Sheng was then exiled to Korea and Zhu Yuanzhang asked the Korean king to treat him as a foreign noble by giving his descendants and family corvée and taxation exemptions. These were granted by a patent from the Korean king which lasted until the invading soldiers in the Qing invasion of Joseon destroyed the Ming family's patents. The Korean official Yun Hui-chong's daughter married Ming Sheng in March 1373. Ming Sheng was 17 and Chen Li was 21 when they were sent to Korea in 1372 by the Ming dynasty. The Chinese Ming family exists as the Korean clans, Yeonan Myeong clan, Seochok Myeong clan and Namwon Seung clan. Additionally, many Ming refugees fled to Korea during the Transition from Ming to Qing. Ming China had previously aided Joseon Korea during the Japanese invasions of Korea, and so Ming Generals such as Chen Lin were viewed favorably as war heroes and their descendents welcomed in Korea. For example, in 1644, when the Qing dynasty replaced the Ming, Chen's grandchild, Chen Yusong (陳泳素) migrated to Korea and started the Jin Clan.

Individual Chinese are recorded on the Korean Peninsula as early as the 13th century, with some going on to found Korean clans. However, there was little recognisable community until July 1882, when the Qing dynasty sent Admiral Wu Changqing and 3,000 troops at the request of the Korean government to aid in quelling a rebellion. Accompanying the troops were some 40 Chinese merchants and other civilians. In August that same year, Qing Superintendent for Trade for the Northern Ports Li Hongzhang lifted restrictions on coastal trade and signed the China–Korea Treaty of 1882 ("Regulations for Maritime and Overland Trade Between Chinese and Korean Subjects"), and two further agreements the following year, which granted Chinese merchants permission to trade in Korea.

Unlike in other Asian countries, 90% of the early overseas Chinese in Korea came from Shandong, rather than the southern coastal provinces of Guangdong and Fujian. During the late 19th and early 20th century Shandong was hard hit by famine, drought, and banditry especially in its northwest, and caused many to migrate to other parts of China and Korea. See Shandong people. Chinese merchants did well in competition with the Japanese due to their superior access to credit. They were not confined to port cities, and many did business in inland parts of Korea. Generally speaking, Japanese traders were more interested in quick profits, while the Chinese established relationships with customers. The earliest Chinese school in Korea, the Joseon Hwagyo Primary School, was established in 1902 in Incheon.

=== Under Japanese rule ===
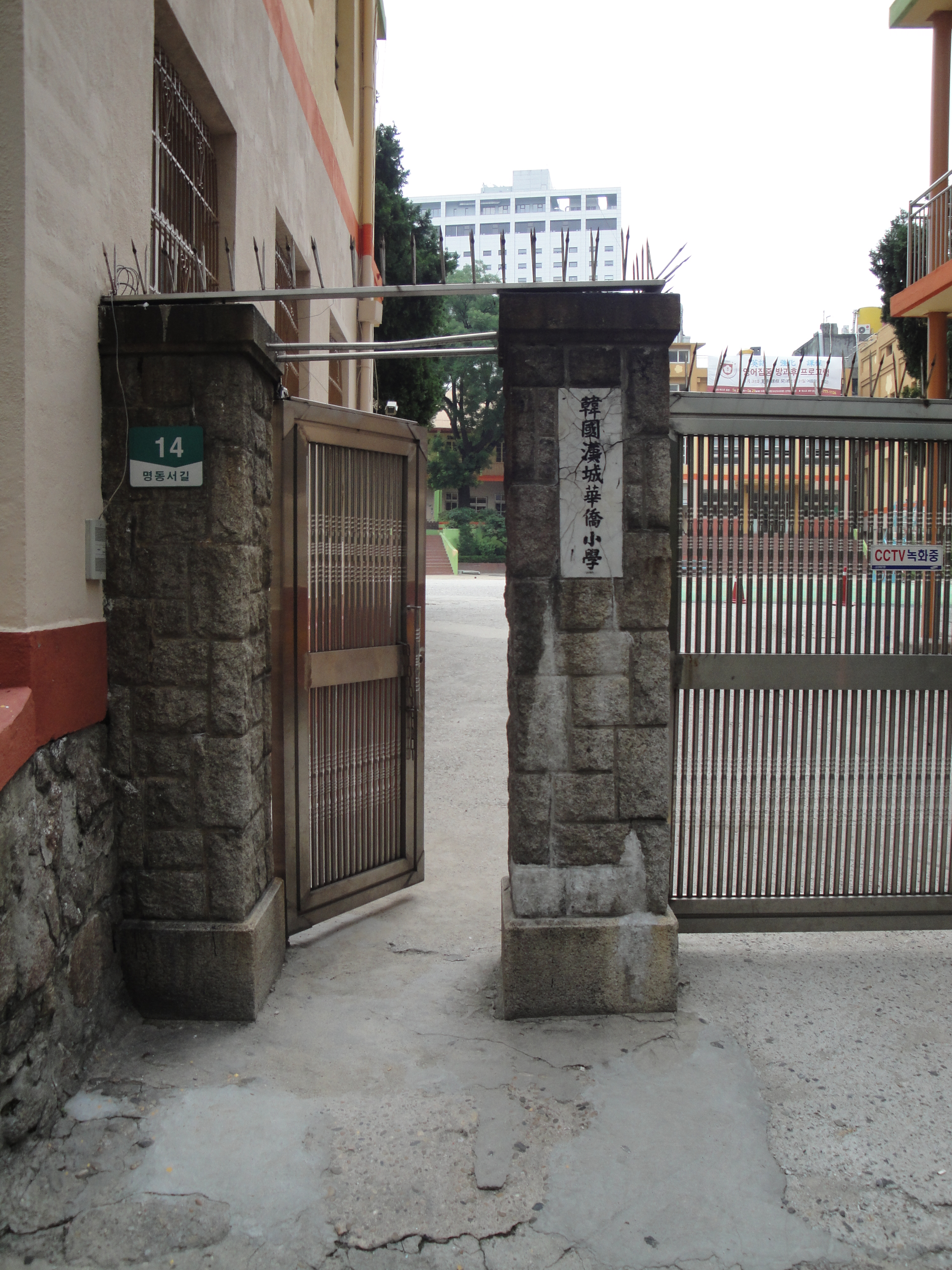
The gate of the Overseas Chinese Primary School in Myeong-dong, Seoul.

By 1910, when Korea formally came under Japanese rule, the number of Chinese in Korea had risen to 12,000. Chinese migrants established schools in Seoul in 1910, Busan in 1912, Sinuiju in 1915, Nampho in 1919, and Wonsan in 1923.

The number of Chinese in Korea would expand to 82,661 by 1942, but contracted sharply to 12,648 by 1945 due to economic hardships faced during World War II.

=== Division of Korea ===
==== North Korea ====
After the surrender of Japan and the liberation of Korea from Japanese rule, Chinese living in the northern half of Korea quickly established new schools and rebuilt Chinese-language education, with aid from the Chinese Communist Party (CCP). In April 1949, the CCP's Northeast Administrative Committee formally handed control of these schools over to the North Korean government, which began some efforts to integrate them into the national educational system. Early financial assistance from the North Korean government actually helped to maintain and expand Chinese education; the schools continued operation even during the Korean War, and the era after the cessation of hostilities up to around 1966 was described as a "golden era" for the schools. After that time, the North Korean government began to pursue a policy of reform and indigenisation towards the schools. However, as of the late 1990s, there were still four Chinese middle schools which followed the PRC curriculum. Some of their graduates go on to PRC universities; for example, Jinan University in Guangzhou had over 100 overseas Chinese students from North Korea as of 2002. Yanbian University in the Yanbian Korean Autonomous Prefecture of China also began offering training programmes for teachers in overseas Chinese schools in North Korea beginning in 2002; 38 students from their first class graduated in 2005.

Being foreign citizens, North Korea's Chinese people were not eligible to join the ruling Korean Workers Party or advance in the military or the civil bureaucracy. On the other hand, they were allowed somewhat greater freedoms, such as the right to own a radio that was not sealed to only allow being tuned to North Korean stations (as long they did not listen to foreign stations in the presence of North Koreans). More importantly, since around 1980 they were allowed to travel abroad, and participate in the important and profitable export-import business. After the PRC government came out in support of United Nations Security Council Resolution 1874 in June 2009, which imposed sanctions in North Korea, it was reported that North Korean surveillance and repression of Chinese residents had increased, and many had chosen to avoid making trips out of the country to avoid scrutiny. One Chinese resident was allegedly charged with espionage. Some Chinese in North Korea managed to flee to South Korea, but the South Korean government refused to grant them South Korean citizenship, so they became stateless.

The population of PRC citizens in North Korea was estimated as 14,351 persons (in 3,778 households) in 1958, shrinking to a mere 6,000 by 1980, as they had been encouraged by the North Korean government to leave for China in the 1960s and 70s. Recent estimates of their population vary. China's official Xinhua News Agency published a figure of 4,000 overseas Chinese and 100 international students in 2008. The Chosun Ilbo, a South Korean newspaper, gave a higher estimate of 10,000 people in 2009. They live mostly in Pyongyang and in the areas near the Chinese border. Additionally, in the 2021 Australian census, 11 (15.6%) of the 81 Australians who reported being born in North Korea also reported speaking Mandarin Chinese at home, while nine (11.1%) also reported having Chinese ancestry.

==== South Korea ====
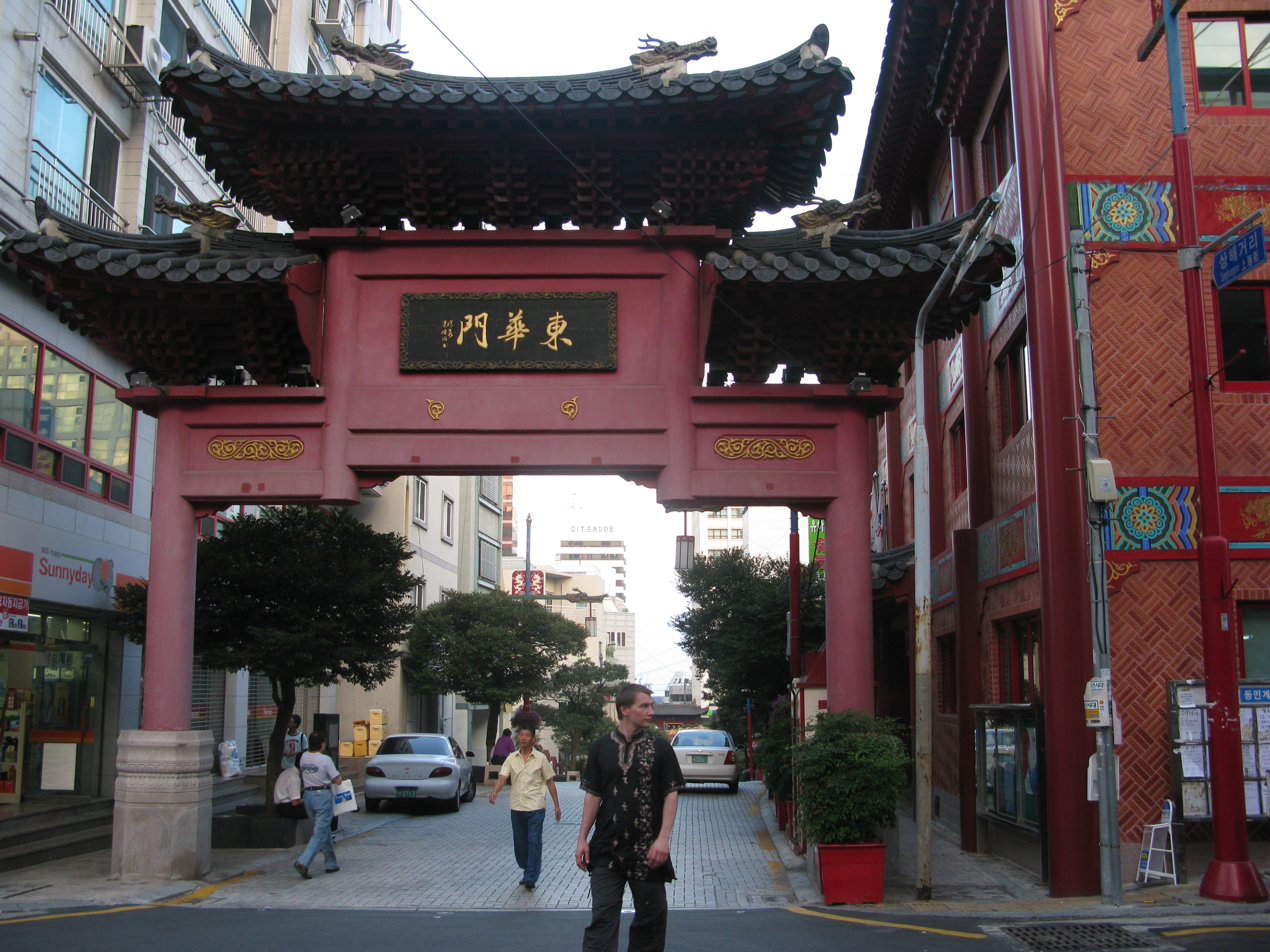
The gate of Busan's Chinatown, located in Choryang-dong, Dong-gu

Prior to and during the Korean War, many Chinese residing in the northern half of the Korean peninsula migrated to the southern half. After the division of Korea, the Chinese population in South Korea would remain stable for some time; however, when Park Chung Hee took power in a coup on May 16, 1961, he began to implement currency reforms and property restrictions which severely harmed the interests of the Chinese community, spurring an exodus. Incheon once had the largest Chinese population in Korea, but as the pace of emigration increased, the number diminished. It is estimated that only 26,700 of the old Chinese community now remain in South Korea; they largely hold Republic of China nationality.

However, in recent years, immigration from mainland China has increased; 696,861 persons of PRC nationality have immigrated to South Korea, making them 55.1% of the total 1,139,283 foreign citizens living in South Korea. Among them are 488,100 of Korean descent (70% of PRC citizens in South Korea, and 40% of the total number of foreign citizens), and 208,761 of other ethnicities. Most of these new residents live in Seoul and its surroundings.

There is a Chinese-language primary school in Myeong-dong, as well as a high school in Seodaemun.

=== Secondary migration ===
Due to the South Korean regulations in the 1960s which limited foreign property ownership, many Chinese in South Korea left the country. During the 1970s, 15,000 are estimated to have moved to the United States, and another 10,000 to Taiwan. Further outmigration occurred during the 1997 Asian financial crisis. Others went to the PRC after its reform and opening up, to pursue commercial opportunities or simply to return to their ancestral hometowns. For example, in Rizhao, Shandong alone, there are 8,200 returned overseas Chinese.

Many Chinese from Korea who migrated to the U.S. have settled in areas with large Korean American communities, such as Los Angeles, and have tended to integrate into the Korean American rather than Chinese American community. Yet, some who went to the United States or Taiwan found they could not adapt to life there either due to linguistic and cultural barriers, and ended up returning to South Korea, in a form of circular migration.

== Religion ==
It has been documented that most Chinese in South Korea are followers of Chinese folk religion, Buddhism and Taoism. Chinese have established some folk temples dedicated to various gods, which provide networks linking back to mainland China or Taiwan. Otherwise, there are no formal Chinese Buddhist and Taoist temples in Korea. Chinese Buddhists attend temples of Korean Buddhism. Many Chinese belong to I-Kuan Tao, a religious movement originating from Chinese folk religion. Since the 1990s, Christianity has made some inroads among the Chinese of Korea, with at least one Chinese-language church established by a pastor from Taiwan. Chinese Catholics attend Korean Catholic churches.

== Education ==
There are multiple ROC (Taiwan) Chinese international schools in South Korea:

- Seoul Chinese Primary School
- Seoul Overseas Chinese High School
- Yeongdeugpou Korea Chinese Primary School (Chinese: 永登浦華僑小學; Korean: 한국영등포화교소학교)
- Overseas Chinese Elementary School Busan (韓國釜山華僑小學; 부산화교소학교)
- Overseas Chinese Middle and High School Busan (韓國釜山華僑中學)
- Overseas Chinese Elementary School Daegu (한국대구화교초등학교) (韓國大邱華僑小學)
- Overseas Chinese Middle and High School Daegu (韓國大邱華僑中學)
- Overseas Chinese School Incheon (인천화교소·중산중고등학교) (仁川華僑中山中學)
- Suwon Zhongzheng Chinese Elementary School (水原華僑中正小學; 수원화교중정소학교)
- Overseas Chinese Elementary School Uijongbu (議政府華僑小學; 의정부화교소학교)
- Wonju Chinese Elementary School (原州華僑小學校; 원주화교소학교)
- Chungju Chinese Elementary School (忠州華僑小學校; 충주화교소학교)
- Onyang Chinese Elementary School (溫陽華僑小學校; 온양화교소학교)
- Kunsan Chinese Elementary School (群山華僑小學; 군산화교소학교)

== Criminal image ==
According to the Korean Justice Ministry in 2010, the crime rate of the 610,000 Chinese in the country was at 2.7%, which was lower than the 3.8% crime rate of native South Koreans.

However, according to politics professor Lee Jean-young at Inha University, many Chinese of Korean descent, who mostly came from rural areas and had a low level of education, did not follow public etiquette rules during the early years of their settlement, such as spitting on streets and littering anywhere. He added that this combined with local media reporting of crimes by ethnic Korean-Chinese people and their depiction as criminals on TV had increased South Korean animosity towards them. With the prevalence of Korean ethnic nationalism, a 2015 survey had 59% of South Korean respondents expressing negative perceptions of Joseonjok and online hate speech has been documented in some top comments for sites such as Nate and Naver.

== Notable people ==
- Hu In-jeong, volleyball player (received South Korean citizenship through naturalization)
- Ha Hee-ra, actress (granted South Korean citizenship after marrying actor Choi Soo-jong)
- Ju Hyun-mi, trot singer
- Sun Sheng Xi, singer-songwriter
- Bii, singer-songwriter and actor

== See also ==
- South Korea-Taiwan relations
- Taiwanese people
- Waishengren
- Incheon Chinatown
- Korean clan names of foreign origin
- Koreans in China
- Koreans in Taiwan

== Sources ==
- Chao, Zhongchen (1998), 山东省日照市旅汉华侨的调查报告, in Sinn, Elizabeth (ed.), The last half century of Chinese overseas [Report of Fieldwork on the Returned Overseas Chinese of South Korea in Rizhao, Shandong], Hong Kong University Press, pp. 463–484, ISBN 978-962-209-446-8
- Choi, Sheena (2001), Gender, Ethnicity and Market Forces: Observations of Ethnic Chinese in Korea, East Asia: History, Politics, Sociology and Culture Series, Routledge, ISBN 978-0-8153-4030-0
- Duus, Peter (1995), The Abacus and the Sword: The Japanese Penetration of Korea, 1895–1910, University of California Press, ISBN 0-520-21361-0
- Hamashita, Takeshi (2001), "Overseas Chinese Financial Networks and Korea", in Sugiyama, Shinya; Grove, Linda (eds.), Commercial networks in modern Asia, Routledge, pp. 56–70, ISBN 978-0-7007-1419-3
- Kim, Kwang-ok (2004), "Chinese in Korea", in Ember, Melvin; Ember, Carol R.; Skoggard, Ian A. (eds.), Encyclopedia of diasporas: immigrant and refugee cultures around the world, Springer, pp. 688–697, ISBN 978-0-306-48321-9
- Kraus, Charles (2014), "Bridging East Asia's Revolutions: The Overseas Chinese in North Korea, 1945–1950", The Journal of Northeast Asian History, 11 (2)
- Larsen, Kirk (2008), Tradition, Treaties, and Trade: Qing Imperialism and Choson Korea, 1850–1910, Harvard University Press, ISBN 978-0-674-02807-4
- 慕德政 [Mu Dezheng] (2001), 朝鲜华侨教育的历史回顾, Overseas Chinese History Studies (in Chinese (China)), 1 (4), ISSN 1002-5162, archived from the original on 2011-07-07
- 慕德政 [Mu Dezheng] (2003), 朝鲜华侨教育的现状, Social Sciences Journal of Yanbian University (in Chinese (China)), 36 (2), ISSN 1009-3311, archived from the original on 2011-07-07
- Rhee, Young-ju (2009), "Diversity within Chinese Diaspora: "Old" versus "New" huaqiao Residents in South Korea" (PDF), in Fernandez, Jane (ed.), Diasporas: Critical and Interdisciplinary Perspectives, Oxford, United Kingdom: Inter-Disciplinary Press, pp. 111–126, ISBN 978-1-904710-68-4, archived from the original (PDF) on 2010-12-28
- Yi, Jeong-hui (2007), 중일전쟁과 조선화교: 조선의 화교소학교를 중심으로 [The Sino-Japanese War and the Overseas Chinese in Korea: Focused on the Joseon Overseas Chinese Primary School] (PDF), Korean Studies of Modern Chinese History 중국근현대사연구: 107–129, ISSN 1598-8287, archived from the original (PDF) on 2011-07-13
