= Mangjul =

Korean family name

- Hangul: 망절
- Hanja: 網切
- RR: Mangjeol
- MR: Mangjŏl

Mangjul (Korean: 망절; Hanja: 網切) is a unique Korean family name. It has its origins from a Japanese surname in the Kagoshima Prefecture by Mangjul Ilrang (Korean: 망절일랑), a mushroom farmer in Dong-myeon, Yangsan City, Gyeongsangnam-do who was born to a Korean mother and Japanese father towards the end of Japanese colonialism in Korea. His original Japanese name is Amikiri Ichirō (網切 一郎). Uniquely, the bon-gwan of this surname is Dogan (Korean: 도간; Hanja: 島間), the Korean name for the hometown of his Japanese grandfather (Shimama 島間, Minamitane 南種子町, Tanegashima Island 種子島, Kagoshima Prefecture 鹿児島県). The 2000 South Korean census found 11 South Koreans belonging to one household who have this unique surname, with eight of them living in Yangsan, one in Busan and two in Ansan. Ichirō Amikiri is currently the patriarch of the Mangjul family.

The surname, Mangjul, became relatively well-known to the South Korean public when Nonghyeop awarded Mangjul Ilrang the Cultural Welfare Prize (농협문화복지대상) in 2008.

== See also ==
- Korean clan names of foreign origin
- Urok Kim clan
- Hambak Kim clan
- Hwasun Song clan
- Songjin Jeup clan
