= Hambak Gim clan =

Korean clan from North Gyeongsang Province

- Country: Korea
- Current region: Gimhae
- Founder: Gim Seong-in

The Hambak Gim clan (Korean: 함박 김씨; Hanja: 咸博金氏) is a Korean clan. Their Bon-gwan is in Gimhae, Cheongdo County. As of 2000, this clan has a membership of 4,579. Their founder was Gim Seong-in, a Japanese general who defected to Korea during the Japanese invasion. He was granted his surname from Seonjo, the king of Korea, as with the Urok Kim clan.

== See also ==
- Korean clan names of foreign origin
- Urok Kim clan
- Mangjeol
- Hwasun Song clan
- Songjin Jeup clan
