= Deoksu Jang clan =

Korean clan from North Hwanghae Province

Deoksu Jang clan 덕수 장씨
- Country: Korea
- Current region: Kaesong, Kaepung County
- Founder: Jang Sun-ryong
- Connected members: Queen Inseon

The Deoksu Jang clan (Korean: 덕수 장씨; Hanja: 德水 張氏) is the bon-gwan or Korean clan from Kaepung County, North Hwanghae Province. The clan was founded by Jang Sun-ryong, an Uyghur Muslim civil servant who served in the Goryeo court.

According to the Korean census held in 2015, the clan has 24,185 members.

== Origin ==
Jang Sun-ryong (장순룡, 張舜龍; 1255-1297) was originally of Uyghur descent, and was the son of Jang Baek-chang (장백창, 張伯昌; 1230-1254), who held the official title of Pildo-chi (필도치, 必闍赤) during the reign of the Yuan Dynasty.

It is said that Jang Sun-ryong and Jang Baek-chang were Uyghurs, a Turkic people in Central Asia. They are an ethnic group currently living in China's Xinjiang Weiwuer Autonomous Region and Central Asia, and their main region is Xuelianhe. Lee Hyeon (이현, 李玄), the founder of the Imcheon Lee clan (임천 이씨), and Seol Son (설손, 偰遜), the founder of the Gyeongju Seol clan (경주 설씨), are said to be Uyghurs and from the Seolian River, like Jang Baek-chang. Tulk, Mongolians, Arabs, and Muslims live in the Seolian River region, but currently, they are all Uyghurs. But it is difficult to determine the detailed ethnic origin of the founder.

According to Deoksu Jang clan Genealogy (덕수장씨족보, 德水張氏族譜) and the History of Goryeo (고려사, 高麗史), Jang Sun-ryong entered Goryeo as a fatherly master of Princess Jeguk, daughter of Kublai Khan, who was married off to Chungnyeol of Goryeo.

He later became a naturalized citizen of Goryeo; becoming Cheomuichamri (첨의참리, 僉議參理) and Munhachanseongsa (문하찬성사, 門下贊成事). With an unnamed wife, he eventually had 1 son: Jang Ryang (장량; 1291-1394).

It is said that his descendants made Deoksu their hometown because he served as a military official and was appointed as Internal Prince Deokseong (덕성부원군, 德城府院君), and was granted Deoksu-hyeon (덕수현, 德水縣) as his hometown.

The Deoksu Jang clan produced 14 people who passed the civil service exam, 1 Queen, and 2 Royal consorts during the Joseon Dynasty.

== See also ==
- Korean clan names of foreign origin
