= Gangneung Yoo clan =

Korean clan from Gangwon Province

- Country: Korea
- Current region: Gangneung
- Founder: Yoo Jeon
- Connected members: Yoo Seung-ho; Yoo In-na; Karina (South Korean singer); Yoo Ji-tae; Yoo Jae-myung; Yoo Jae-suk; Yoo Jun-sang; Yu Oh-seong; Yoo Dong-geun; Yoo Seong-min; Yu Jae-hung

Gangneung Yoo clan (Korean: 강릉 유씨; Hanja: 江陵 劉氏) is one of the Korean clans. Their bon-gwan was in Gangneung. According to the research held in 2000, the number of Gangneung Yoo clan was 178913. Their founder was Yoo Jeon who came from the Northern Song dynasty. According to their family tree, Yoo Jeon was an Emperor Gaozu of Han's 41st descendant. Yoo Jeon worked as minister of defense (兵部尚書, Bingbu Shangshu) in the Northern Song dynasty during Emperor Shenzong of Song's reign. However, he was ousted by Wang Anshi because he was a member of old policies party. As a result, he fled Goryeo. Their clans contain Geochang Yoo clan and Baecheon Yoo clan who call themselves one of the descendants of Yoo Jeon.

== See also ==
- Korean clan names of foreign origin
