= Goesan Eum clan =

Korean clan from North Chungcheong Province

- Country: Korea
- Current region: Goesan County
- Founder: Eum Jeong (Hanja: 陰鼎)

Goesan Eum clan (Korean: 괴산 음씨; Hanja: 槐山 陰氏) was one of the Korean clans. Their Bon-gwan was in Goesan County, North Chungcheong Province. According to the research in 2000, the number of Goesan Eum clan was 2086. Eum jun who was a minister of rites (Hanja: 禮部侍郎, Lǐbu Shilang) began Goesan Eum clan after he came over from China. Goesan Eum clan was separated from Juksan Eum clan. Eum Jeong (Hanja: 陰鼎) who passed Imperial examination in 1083 was a founder of Goesan Eum clan.

== See also ==
- Korean clan names of foreign origin
