= Korean nobility =

Former social class in Korea

Korean nobility existed in Korea until the end of the Japanese occupation and the defeat of Japan. After the independence and the installation of the Constitution that adopted republic system, the concept of nobility has been abolished, both formally and in practice.

== Sources ==
Buddhist monks became the purveyors and guardians of Korea's literary traditions while documenting Korea's written history and legacies from the Silla period to the end of the Goryeo dynasty. Korean Buddhist monks also developed and used the first movable metal type printing presses in history—some 500 years before Gutenberg—to print ancient Buddhist texts. Buddhist monks also engaged in record keeping, food storage and distribution, as well as the ability to exercise power by influencing the Goryeo royal court.

== Ruler and princely styles ==
=== Original titles ===
The monarchs of Goguryeo adopted the title of "Taewang" (태왕; 太王), which placed them on the same level as the Chinese emperors. The literal translation of the title is the Greatest King.

The early monarchs of Silla have used the title of "Geoseogan" (거서간; 居西干), "Chachaung" (차차웅; 次次雄), "Isageum" (이사금; 尼師今), and finally "Maripgan" (마립간; 麻立干) until 503. This follows from an earlier tradition when Korean kings were styled either Han or Kan, which are cognates of the Turkic khan. Marip originally meant the highest, and gan meant rulers.

In addition, Baekje used the title of "Eoraha" (어라하; 於羅瑕), "Ha" meaning "rulers" and "Eora" meaning "the largest".

=== Imperial titles ===
Goguryeo monarchs adopted the title "Taewang" (Korean: 태왕; Hanja: 太王; lit. 'greatest king').

Goryeo monarchs adopted the title(s) Seonghwang (Korean: 성황; Hanja: 聖皇; lit. 'holy emperor') or emperor. However, unlike the Goguryeo, the imperial titles were not used in diplomatic campaigns with the prominent Chinese Dynasties of that time. Goryeo dropped its Imperial title for a short period after the peace treaty with the Mongols. It was later reinstated for a short while after the Goryeo dynasty defeated the Mongols in the 1360s.

The title Hwangje (Korean: 황제; Hanja: 皇帝; lit. 'emperor') was revived for less than two decades during the Korean Empire that came after Joseon.

=== Royal titles ===
Wang (Korean: 왕; Hanja: 王; lit. 'king') was a ruling status used in many states rising from the dissolution of Gojoseon, Buyeo, Goguryeo, Baekje, Silla and Balhae, Goryeo. In late Goryeo (918-1392) and the Joseon Dynasty (until 1897) the rulers of Korea were still known as "wang", as evident in the title of King Sejong the Great. However, they were referred to by their temple names.

Although often translated in English as "king", this title also applied to a female ruler. Female rulers, equivalent to queen regnant in English, were informally referred to as yeowang (Korean: 여왕; Hanja: 女王; lit. 'female king').

Wangbi (왕비; 王妃) was title for the wife of the reigning king, equivalent to queen consort in English.

The title Daewang (Korean: 대왕; Hanja: 大王; lit. 'great king') was also used in many Korean states.

Balhae monarchs adopted the title Seongwang (Korean: 성왕; Hanja: 聖王; lit. 'holy king').

=== Prince ===
Gun (Korean: 군; Hanja: 君) has the common meaning of 'monarch', however in this specific context, it can also mean 'prince'. Before the Joseon era, the regulations behind the entitlement of royals and nobles were unclear and inconsistent. In the early Goryeo Dynasty, the sons of the king who were not the crown prince, were entitled as guns, wonguns, gungguns, while after 1031, royals began to be entitled using five ranks, which were: gongjak (Duke), hujak (Marquess), baekjak (Count), jajak (Viscount), and namjak (Baron). It is after the establishment of the Joseon Dynasty that this becomes solid.

In the Joseon Dynasty, solid regulations about investiture were established, for both royals and non-royals. Legitimate sons of the king (those born of the queen consort) were entitled as a daegun (Korean: 대군; Hanja: 大君; lit. 'grand prince'). The princes born of concubine was given the title gun, distinguished from daeguns with the term wangjagun (Korean: 왕자군; Hanja: 王子君), combining the word meaning 'king's son' - prince and gun. The gun title could be succeeded up to the great-grandsons of a daegun, grandsons of the crown prince and wangjaguns, The father of the king who himself has never reigned was given the special title of daewongun (Korean: 대원군; Hanja: 大院君; lit. 'grand internal prince').

Non-royal servants could also receive the princely title as well. Buwongun (Korean: 부원군; Hanja: 府院君; lit. 'internal prince of the court'), was the title of the father of the queen consort, or gongsins who have reached the first rank. A gongsin (Korean: 공신; Hanja: 功臣; lit. 'meritorious servant') was the title of a servant who had distinguished himself in the service of the king and court. They were eligible to be invested as a gun after they reached the second rank. (And even if they did not in their lifetime, they would be raised to the second rank posthumously, therefore qualifying them for entitlement.)

When one became a gongsin, his ancestors up to his paternal great-grandparent would be posthumously promoted in rank, with his father especially being named different classes of gongsin depending on the class of the gongsin title of his son (first to third class). He would also be entitled as a gun, all posthumously.

All gun titles had a prefix attached to them, the name of that servant's bon-gwan. For example, Yoon In-Gyeong, a 16th century politician, was named a gongsin in the aftermath of the Fourth Literati Purge of 1545, among thirty others. Because of this, he was raised to the first rank and therefore was invested as the Paseong Buwongun (Korean: 파성부원군; Hanja: 坡城府院君; lit. 'Internal Prince of Paseong'). Paseong is the name of his bon-gwan, Papyeong (Korean: 파평; Hanja: 坡平), with the second character altered into seong. This was done in order to avoid confusions between guns that had the same bon-gwan and therefore the same title name, a practice done with other characters commonly attached to place names as suffixes, such as san (Korean: 산; Hanja: 山; lit. 'mountain'), cheon (Korean: 천; Hanja: 川; lit. 'river'), ahn (Korean: 안; Hanja: 安; lit. 'calm'), etc. Though designed as a titular appointment as a lord of the area, the title was purely honorific.

The gun title could only be entitled upon the eldest descendant of the gongsin when he reached the second rank. Those who had their titles inherited would be referred to as seungseupgun (Korean: 승습군; Hanja: 承襲君; lit. 'inherited prince'), similarly to the concept of wangjagun. The inheritance was called seungseup (Korean: 승습; Hanja: 承襲; lit. 'succession'). Buwongun titles earned by being the father of the queen consort could not be inherited.

The dethroned rulers of Joseon Dynasty that did not receive a temple name are presently referred to as their gun title from when they were princes. There were three dethroned kings known as guns in the Joseon Dynasty (one restored to the dignity of king and given a temple name posthumously).

Under the Korean Empire (1897-1910), the close male relatives of the Emperor were given the title of chinwang (Korean: 친왕; Hanja: 親王). While the literal translation of the title is 'imperial king of the blood', the meaning that fits here is 'imperial prince of the blood', as 'king' is one step down from 'emperor'. Only four chinwang were appointed; the three sons and one brother of Gojong.

== Aristocracy before Joseon ==
=== Silla ===
In Silla, the nobility was categorized by the Bone rank system.

Royal families split into two classes: sacred bone, which meant eligibility for the royal succession, and true bone, until the former was extinguished.

Non-royal nobles split into three classes: the 6th head rank, the 5th head rank and the 4th head rank; the 6th being the highest.

=== Goryeo ===
Servants that were not royals would be given titles and land that had the words gaeguk (Korean: 개국; Hanja: 開國). This word meant founding of a state, but this was a system transferred from China during the Later Three Kingdoms Period, and by that time the feudal system related to the distribution of land as separate fiefs as implied in the word gaeguk had mainly faded. In Goryeo, this feudal system remained in place until 1436. These titles had a two character prefix that represented the land that the recipient was affiliated to/was from - land that would be distributed to them in the system called sigeup (Korean: 식읍; Hanja: 食邑).

- Gukgaegukgong (국개국공, 國開國公), Duke of a state
- Gungaegukgong (군개국공, 郡開國公), Duke of a county
- Hyeongaegukhu (현개국후, 縣開國侯), Marquis of a town
- Hyeongaegukbaek (현개국백, 縣開國伯), Count of a town
- Gaegukja (개국자, 開國子), Viscount
- Hyeonnam (현개국남, 縣開國男), Baron of a town

Starting from 1031, Goryeo princes began to be invested in 6 different classes of titles, the same way as nobles not of the royal family, but with the gaeguk fixes removed.

Also the title Taeja (태자; 太子) was given to sons of emperor not like other east Asian countries. In other countries, this title meant crown prince. Taeja was similar to Chinwang (친왕; 親王) of the Korean Empire.

== Noble families in Korea ==
Some clans whose social rank throughout Korean history could be considered equivalent to nobility are as follows (this is merely a sample and nowhere near the total list of families who attained and/or retained such social rank over the duration of Korea's lengthy history; families on this list are often also recognizable via their status during the Joseon era as yangban families).

List of Noble families in Korea, such as:

- House of Yi (Joseon Dynasty)
- House of Moon (East Tamna Dynasty, Jeju Island)
- House of Ko (West Tamna Dynasty, Jeju Island)
- House of Park (Silla Dynasty)
- Papyeong Yoon
- Cheongju Han
- Gyeongju Yi
- Andong Kim
- Gimhae Kim
- Miryang Park
- Yeoheung Min
- Dalseong Seo
- Gyeongju Seok
- Pyeongyang Ko

== Foreign noble families in Korea ==
The Chinese Ming Xia emperor Ming Yuzhen's son Ming Sheng was given the noble title Marquis of Guiyi by the Ming dynasty Hongwu Emperor after his surrender. Ming Sheng was then exiled to Korea at the age of 17 in 1372 by the Ming dynasty. The Korean official Yun Hui-chong's married his daughter off to Ming Sheng in March 1373. The emperor asked the Korean king to treat Ming Sheng as a foreign noble by giving his descendants and family corvée and taxation exemptions. These were granted by a patent from the Korean king which lasted until the invading soldiers in the Qing invasion of Joseon destroyed the Ming family's patents. The Chinese Ming family exists as the Korean clans, Yeonan Myeong clan, Seochok Myeong clan and Namwon Seung clan.

== See also ==
- Rulers of Korea
- Bone rank system
- Yangban
- House of Yi
- Styles and titles in the Joseon dynasty
