= Suan Gye clan =

Korean clan from North Hwanghae Province

- Country: Korea
- Current region: Suan County
- Founder: Gye Seok son
- Connected members: Kye Yong-mook; Kye Sun-hui

Suan Gye clan (Korean: 수안 계씨; Hanja: 遂安 桂氏) is one of the Korean clans. Their Bon-gwan is in Suan County, North Hwanghae Province. According to the research held in 2015, the number of Suan Gye clan’s member was 6056. Their founder was Gye Seok son who was from Ming dynasty and was naturalized in Joseon. When he worked as the Ministry of Rites (禮部, Lǐbù), he was dispatched to teach Li (Confucianism) because of Hongwu Emperor’s order. After Gye Seok son was naturalized, he became Prince of Suan and founded Suan Gye clan.

== See also ==
- Korean clan names of foreign origin
