= Jeolgang Pyeon clan =

Korean clan from Zhejiang, China

- Country: Korea
- Current region: Zhejiang
- Origin: Zhejiang, China
- Founder: Pyeon Gal song
- Connected members: Pyun Hye-young

The Jeolgang Pyeon clan (Korean: 절강 편씨; Hanja: 浙江 片氏) is one of the Bon-gwan or clans of Korea originating in Zhejiang, China. According to research conducted in 2000, the number of Jeolgang Pyeon clan’s members was 10,678.

== Origin ==
The clan was founded by Pyeon Gal song, a military commissioner in the Ming dynasty from Zhejiang. He sent troops to Joseon as the Area Commander (Hanja: 都督) during the Japanese invasions in the late 16th century, but he was not able to come back to his country due to a betrayal. He was naturalized in Joseon. After his three sons heard the news, they went to Joseon, and settled in Naju, Jeolla Province.

== See also ==
- Korean clan names of foreign origin
- Haeju Seok clan
