= Gyeongju Bing clan =

Korean clan from North Gyeongsang Province

Gyeongju Ping clan
- Country: Korea
- Current region: Gyeongju
- Founder: Ping Yeo gyeong

Gyeongju Ping clan (Korean: 경주 빙씨; Hanja: 慶州 氷氏) is one of the Korean clans. Their Bon-gwan is in Gyeongju, North Gyeongsang Province. According to the research held in 2000, the number of Gyeongju Ping clan’s member was 722. Their founder was Ping Yeo gyeong who was from Ming dynasty. Ping Yeo gyeong passed Imperial examination and worked as Grand Scholar of Wenyuan Cabinet (Hanja: 文淵閣大學士) and munha sirang pyeongjangsa (문하시랑평장사; 門下侍郞平章事). After that, when Ping Yeo gyeong worked as Hanlin Academy, he went to Joseon and was naturalized in Korea. Sejo of Joseon treated Ping Yeo gyeong as a national guest and appointed him as Prince of Gyeongju. Sejo of Joseon also gave a government post named Ijo (이조, 吏曹) and Seungji to Ping Yeo gyeong.

== See also ==
- Korean clan names of foreign origin
