= Yeongdo Ha clan =

Korean clan from Busan

- Country: Korea
- Current region: Yeongdo District
- Founder: Robert Holley

The Yeongdo Ha clan (Korean: 영도 하씨; Hanja: 影島 河氏) is a Korean clan, which is a group of people that share the same paternal ancestor and is indicated by the combination of a bon-gwan and a family name (or clan name). Its registered locality is in Yeongdo District, Busan. According to research conducted in 2000: four people belong to the clan. The clan was founded by Robert Holley, a former international lawyer originally from the United States. He renounced his American citizenship, and formed the Yeongdo Ha clan after gaining his Korean citizenship.

== See also ==
- Korean clan names of foreign origin
- Yeongdo District
- Bon-gwan
- Robert Holley
