= Adada =

1987 film

- Theatrical poster
- Hangul: 아다다
- RR: Adada
- MR: Adada
- Directed by: Im Kwon-taek
- Screenplay by: Gye Yong-muk; Yoon Sam-yook
- Story by: Kye Yong-mook
- Produced by: Park Jong-chan
- Starring: Shin Hye-soo; Han Ji-il
- Cinematography: Jung Il-sung
- Edited by: Park Soon-duk
- Music by: Kim Young-dong
- Distributed by: Hwa Chun Trading Company
- Release date: March 19, 1987
- Running time: 118 minutes
- Country: South Korea
- Language: Korean
- Box office: $0

Adada (Korean: 아다다) is a 1987 South Korean drama film directed by Im Kwon-taek, based on a story by Kye Yong-mook.

== Plot ==
The film tells the story of a deaf-mute woman living in a small village in Korea during the 1920s.A deaf and mute but mentally sane woman Adada is an active figure in the village. Yonghwan, a man of a now disgraced Yangban family, takes Adada as bride and marries her. However Yonghwan who indulges in heavy drinking leaves her and goes to China and get a new bride which is welcomed by his family, and his family returns the dowry for Adada. Disillusioned by the whole situation she visits Suryong, who was a childhood acquaintance and Suryong promises happiness with him. However, Suryong succumbs to his lust for money and disappointed Adada drown herself in the river. Suryong finds her corpse and mourns.

== Cast ==
- Adada - Shin Hye-soo
- Yonghwan - Han Ji-il
- Suryong - Lee Geung-young
- groom's mother - Kim Ji-young
- bride's father - Jeon Moo-song
- groom's father - Park Wung

== Awards ==
- Best Actress (Shin Hye-soo), Montreal World Film Festival

== Sources ==
- Cho, Eunsun (2002). "The Female Body and Enunciation in Adada and Surrogate Mother". In James, David E. & Kim Kyung-hyun (ed.). Im Kwon-Taek: The Making of a Korean National Cinema. Detroit: Wayne State University Press. pp. 84–106. ISBN 0-8143-2869-5.
