= Chongji =

Chongji may be

- the courtesy name of Joseon dynasty aristocrat Chŏng Tojŏn
- McCune–Reischauer romanization of Jongji-ri, village in Hansan-myeon, Seocheon-gun, Chungcheongnam-do
- Revised Romanization of the pen name of Unified Silla period Confucian scholar Seol Chong
