= Kim Ch'ungsŏn =

Japanese defector to Korea (1571–1642)

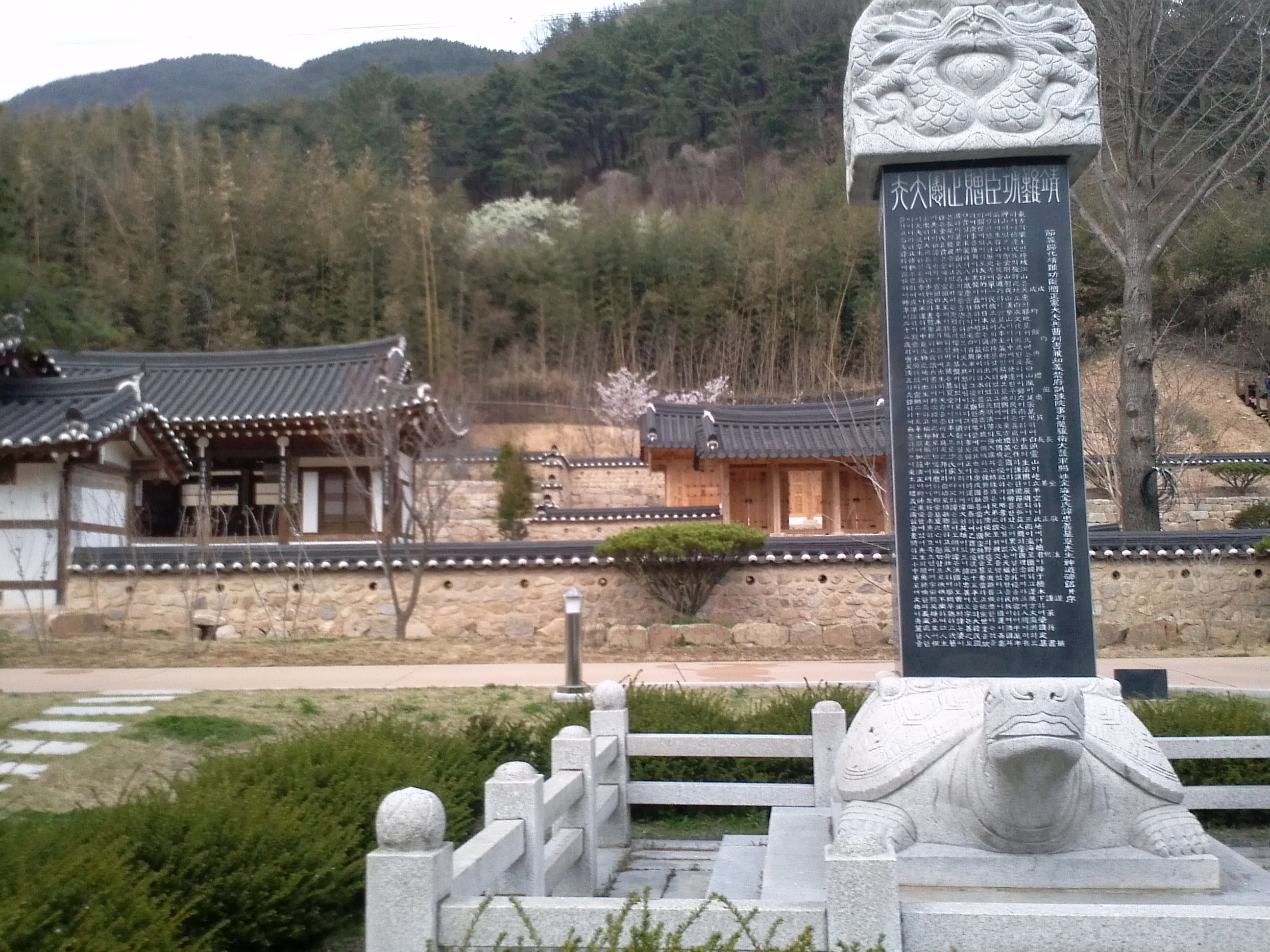
- Nokdong Seowon

Korean name
- Hangul: 김충선
- Hanja: 金忠善
- RR: Gim Chungseon
- MR: Kim Ch'ungsŏn

Art name
- Hangul: 모하당
- Hanja: 慕夏堂
- RR: Mohadang
- MR: Mohadang

Courtesy name
- Hangul: 선지
- Hanja: 善之
- RR: Seonji
- MR: Sŏnji

Kim Ch'ungsŏn (Korean: 김충선; Hanja: 金忠善; 1571–1642), also known by his birth name Sayaka (沙也可) (Note: On some websites (such as Korea JoongAng Daily), the pronunciation of Kim Chung-seon's original name (i.e. his Japanese name) is Sayaga (with the letter G in place of K)) and art name Mohadang (모하당), was a Japanese general who defected to Korea during the Japanese invasion. (Note: The reason why Sayaga/Sayaka or Kim Chung-seon defected from Japan to Korea was due to the fact that he doesn't want to kill the innocent people of Joseon, in addition to having always revered the culture of Joseon and China.)

He originally invaded Joseon as the Left Vanguard Commander under Katō Kiyomasa (가토淸正). However, he defected to the Joseon side and surrendered to Gyeongsang Jwabyeongsa (Commander of the Gyeongsang Left Province Army) Pak Chin (朴晉). He achieved military successes in areas like Gyeongju and Ulsan, for which he was granted the rank of Gaseondaebu (嘉善大夫) and the title of Cheomji (첨지). Following the recommendation (Jucheong) of Supreme Commander Gwon Yul (權慄) and Royal Inspector Han Jung-gyeom (韓浚謙), he was bestowed the surname Kim (of the Gimhae Kim clan) and the name Ch'ungsŏn (忠善) by the King. (Note: His family line is often referred to as Saseong Gimhae Kim-ssi (사성 김해 김씨), meaning the Gimhae Kim clan bestowed by the King.) He was subsequently promoted to Jaheondaebu (資憲大夫). During the second Japanese invasion, he participated in the Uiryeong Battle alongside other surrendered Japanese generals, such as Son Siro (孫時老), achieving significant merit.

After the war, when the border became unstable due to the invasion of northern Jurchen tribes (야인), he volunteered for military service and defended the frontier for over ten years. In 1613 (Year 5 of Gwanghaegun's reign), he was promoted to Jeongheondaebu (正憲大夫).

When Yi Gwal's Rebellion (1624) erupted, he distinguished himself by capturing and executing Seo Ah-ji (徐牙之), a lieutenant of the rebel Yi Gwal. He was awarded Sapaeji (賜牌地 - bestowed land) for this service but declined it, requesting the land be used for the state-run military farms (Dunjeon) of the Royal Defense Command.

In 1636, when the Qing invaded Joseon, Kim without waiting for a formal call-up (Somyeong), he immediately went to fight in the Ssangnyeong Battle (쌍령) in Gwangju, where he is recorded as having killed over 500 Jurchen soldiers. In 1643, while serving as Oegoe Gwon-gwan (外怪權管) defending the border, he was relieved of his post due to a protest from the Qing envoy. When the peace treaty (surrender) was finalized, he wept bitterly and returned to his home in Nongni (鹿里), Daegu. He married the daughter of the local Magistrate (Moksa) Jang Chun-jeom (張春點) and settled in Urok-dong (present-day Gachang-myeon, Dalseong-gun, Daegu Metropolitan City). He focused on local reform by establishing family precepts (Gahun) and local self-governance rules (Hyangyak).

His collected works, Mohadangjip (慕夏堂集) in 3 volumes, were published in 1798 (Year 22 of Jeongjo's reign). The Nokdong Seowon in Urok-ri was erected in his memory in the same year. This seowon was abolished in 1864 as part of the regent Daewon-gun's general campaign against seowon, but was reestablished in 1914 under the Japanese colonial regime. The seowon remains a popular destination for Japanese tourists in Daegu.

In 1930, Hidetaka Nakamura of the Japanese colonial government's Korean History Compilation Committee conducted an investigation and confirmed that Kim Ch'ungsŏn was indeed a Japanese defector. Recently, a monument in memory of Kim was built in Wakayama Prefecture, Japan.

Kim Ch'ungsŏn is the founder of one of the Korean clans, the Urok Kim clan. Kim's 6th-generation descendants compiled his collected works, which exist in two editions.

== Popular culture ==
- Portrayed by Hiromitsu Takeda in the 2017 tvN TV series Live Up to Your Name.

== See also ==
- List of Joseon people
