= Chinese North Korean =

Chinese North Korean or North Korean Chinese may refer to:

- China–North Korea relations, the foreign relations between the People's Republic of China and the Democratic People's Republic of Korea
- North Koreans in China
- Ethnic Chinese in North Korea
- Mixed race people of Chinese and North Korean descent
