= Gwangcheon Dong clan =

Korean clan from Hebei, China

Kwangchon Tong clan
- Country: Korea
- Current region: Hebei
- Founder: Dong Seung Seon
- Connected members: Taeyang

Kwangchon Tong clan (Korean: 광천 동씨; Hanja: 廣川 董氏) is one of the Korean clans. Their Bon-gwan was in Hebei, China. According to the research held in 2000, the number of the Kwangchon Tong clan was 4130. Their founder was Dong Seung Seon who was a 43rd descendant of Dong Zhongshu in Han dynasty. He was naturalized in Korea during Goryeo period and contributed to founding the kingdom of Korea.

== See also ==
- Korean clan names of foreign origin
