= Ganghwa Man clan =

Korean clan from Incheon

- Country: Korea
- Current region: Ganghwa County
- Founder: Man Se deok
- Connected members: Manjeok

Ganghwa Man clan (Korean: 강화 만씨; Hanja: 江華 萬氏) is one of the Korean clans. Their Bon-gwan is in Ganghwa County, Incheon. According to the research held in 1985, the number of Ganghwa Man clan’s member was 282. Their founder was Man Se deok who worked as envoy in Ming dynasty. He was sent troops to Joseon as reinforcements from Ming dynasty during Japanese invasions of Korea (1592–98). His ancestor was Wan Xiu (Hanja: 萬脩) who was one of the Yuntai 28 generals in Han dynasty during Emperor Ming of Han’s reign.

== See also ==
- Korean clan names of foreign origin
