= Kaesong Ro clan =

Korean clan from Kaesong

Ro clan of Kaesong
- Country: Korea
- Current region: Kaesong
- Founder: Ro Eun gyeong

The Kaesong Ro clan (Korean: 개성 로씨; Hanja: 開城 路氏) is a Korean clan. According to the research held in 2015, the number of Ro clan of Kaesong's members was 2,232. Ro clan came from a Chinese clan. Ro clan was made because Chinese Empire appointed Chinese Empire's descendant as Ro. Ro clan of Kaesong's founder was Ro Eun gyeong who was Yuan dynasty's Hanlin Academy. Ro Eun Gyeong entered Goryeo as a fatherly master of Princess Noguk who had a marriage to an ordinary person planned by Gongmin of Goryeo in Goryeo and was settled in Kaesong.

== See also ==
- Korean clan names of foreign origin
