= Taean Lee clan =

Korean clan from South Chungcheong Province

- Country: Korea
- Current region: Taean County
- Founder: Lee Gi

Taean Lee clan (Korean: 태안 이씨; Hanja: 泰安 李氏) is one of the Korean clans. Their Bon-gwan is in Taean County, South Chungcheong Province. According to the research held in 2000, the number of Taean Lee clan’s member was 4084. Their founder was Lee Gi who was a descendant of Lee Seung nam (Hanja: 李昇南) in Tang dynasty. Lee Gi was from Longxi Commandery, China. Lee Gi exiled himself to Taean in Goryeo to avoid conflictions in Goryeo during Gwangjong of Goryeo’s reign. Lee Cheon (Hanja: 李蕆), 7 th descendant of Lee Gi, was awarded lands in Taean and became Prince of Taean. Then, Lee Cheon (Hanja: 李蕆) founded Taean Lee clan and made Taean, Taean Lee clan’s Bon-gwan.

== See also ==
- Korean clan names of foreign origin
