= Sinchang Pyo clan =

Korean clan from South Chungcheong Province

- Country: Korea
- Current region: Asan
- Founder: Pyo Dae bak
- Connected members: Pyo Chang-won; P.O; Pyo Ye-jin

Sinchang Pyo clan (Korean: 신창 표씨; Hanja: 新昌 表氏) is one of the Korean clans. Their Bon-gwan is in Asan, South Chungcheong Province. According to the research held in 2015, the number of Sinchang Pyo clan’s member was 28894. Their founder was Pyo Dae bak who was a minister of civil service affairs (吏部尚書, Hubu Shangshu) in Later Zhou. He was naturalized in Goryeo after the Later Zhou’s extinction in 960. After that, 表仁呂, his descendant, was appointed as Gongsin (Hanja: 功臣) during Chungsuk of Goryeo’s reign and became Prince of Onchang. Then, Pyo Dae bak founded Sinchang Pyo clan.

== See also ==
- Korean clans of foreign origin
