= Geoje Ban clan =

Korean clan from South Gyeongsang Province

- Country: Korea
- Current region: Geoje
- Founder: Pan Pu
- Connected members: Ban Ki-moon; Ban Hyo-jung

Geoje Ban clan (Korean: 거제 반씨; Hanja: 巨濟 潘氏) is a Korean clan.

Their Bon-gwan is in Geoje, South Gyeongsang Province. As of 2015, Geoje Ban contained 12 814 members. Their founder was Pan Pu, descended of Ji Sun, a son of Gao, Duke of Bi (a 15th son of Wen, a 3rd King of Zhou). After passing the Imperial examination with the top result, Pan Pu attended Hanlin Academy, and worked as minister of civil service affairs (吏部尚書, Lìbu Shangshu) in the Song dynasty during the reign of Emperor Lizong. Pan was sent as an envoy to the Yuan dynasty, with the expectations that he would be killed but was instead spared by Kublai Khan. In the Yuan capital of Khanbaliq, Pan Pu met the crown prince of Goryeo, the future King Chungnyeol, and decided to serve Goryeo.

After this, Pan Pu entered Goryeo kingdom as a fatherly master of Princess Jeguk, who had a marriage to an ordinary person planned by Chungnyeol of Goryeo and worked as Jeongdang munhak (Hanja: 政堂文學). Pan Pu also joined in with the Mongol invasions of Japan due to Kim Panggyŏng’s command. Pan Pu retired at 65 years old.

Pan Pu died in Geoje. His descendant officially started Geoje Ban clan.

== See also ==
- Korean clan names of foreign origin
