= Hoesan Gam clan =

Korean clan from South Gyeongsang Province

Yangsan Jin clan
- Country: Korea
- Current region: Changwon
- Founder: Gam Gyu
- Connected members: Kam Woo-sung

Hoesan Gam clan (Korean: 회산 감씨; Hanja: 檜山 甘氏) is one of the Korean clans. Their Bon-gwan is in Changwon, South Gyeongsang Province. According to the research held in 2000, the number of Hoesan Gam clan’s member was in 679 households 2113 members out of 4892 total Gam members. Their founder was Gam Gyu who was a Hanlin Academy in Yuan dynasty. He entered Goryeo in 1349. He was there as a fatherly master when Princess Noguk had a marriage to an ordinary person planned by Gongmin of Goryeo. He made Hoesan, Hoesan Gam clan’s Bon-gwan and founded Hoesan Gam clan because Gam Cheol (Hanja: 甘喆), 16 th descendant of Gam Gyu, was appointed as Jinzi Guanglu Daifu (Hanja: 金紫光祿大夫) and became Prince of Hoesan.

== See also ==
- Korean clan names of foreign origin
