= Boseong Seon clan =

Korean clan from South Jeolla Province

- Country: Korea
- Current region: Boseong County
- Founder: Seon Yun ji
- Connected members: Sun Dong-yol

Boseong Seon clan (Korean: 보성 선씨; Hanja: 寶城 宣氏) is a Korean clan. Their Bon-gwan is in Boseong County, South Jeolla Province. As of 2000, there are about 34842 members in the clan. Their founder was Seon Yun ji who was naturalized in Goryeo. He was a descendant of Shusun Qiaoru (叔孙侨如), the great-great-grandson of Huan, the Duke of State of Lu. He fulfilled his duty as Secretary (Hanja: 學士) in the Ming dynasty in 1382. He stabilized the citizenry by making achievements, such as winning a battle against Jeolla Province's troops in a coastal area during Wokou. He abandoned his rank when Goryeo was destroyed, and chose to settle in Boseong.

== See also ==
- Korean clan names of foreign origin
