= Goksan Yeon clan =

Korean clan from North Hwanghae Province

- Country: Korea
- Current region: Sinpyong County
- Founder: Yeon Sa Jong
- Connected members: Yeon Jung-hoon, Yeon Sang-ho
- Website: https://www.goksan.co.kr/home/index.php

Goksan Yeon clan (Korean: 곡산 연씨; Hanja: 谷山 延氏) is one of the Korean clans. Their Bon-gwan is in sinpyong County, North Hwanghae Province.

Yeon clan originated from Nanyang Commandery (Hanja: 南陽郡; around present-day Nanyang, Henan), China. Their founder was Yeon Gye ryeong who served as Menxia Shilang (Hanja: 門下侍郎) and general officer in Goryeo. Yeon Gye ryeong was from Hongnong Commandery (Hanja: 弘農郡; south of present-day Lingbao City, Henan). Yeon Su chang (Korean: 연수창; Hanja: 延壽菖), 7th descendant of Yeon Gye ryeong became a subordinate of Princess Jeguk who was forced to marry ordinary person by Chungnyeol of Goryeo and was settled in Koksan County. Yeon Ju (Korean: 연주; Hanja: 延柱), 11th descendant of Yeon Gye ryeong, appointed as Household Counsellor (Hanja: 光祿大夫) and Sansī Left Messenger (Hanja: 三司左使). Then, he founded Goksan Yeon clan because he was appointed as Count of Koksan.

The clan gained notoriety for producing several Korean independence activists during the Japanese colonial era. Yeon Byung-hwan (ko), his younger brother Yeon Byung-ho (ko) and daughter Yeon Mi-dang (ko) were associates of more high-profile figures such as Kim Gu and Ahn Changho and aided their anti-Japanese activities.

== See also ==
- Korean clan names of foreign origin
