= Jeolgang Si clan =

Korean clan from Zhejiang, China

Jeolgang Jang clan
- Country: Korea
- Current region: Zhejiang
- Founder: Si Mun yong

Jeolgang Si clan (Korean: 절강 시씨; Hanja: 浙江 施氏) is one of the Korean clans. Their Bon-gwan is in Zhejiang, China. According to the research held in 2015, the number of Jeolgang Si clan’s member was 2011. Their founder was Si Mun yong who was a general in Ming dynasty. He fought in Japanese invasions of Korea (1592–98) as Ming dynasty’s Central Army. He was settled in North Gyeongsang Province because he was injured during the war and was not able to come back to his country. After that, Si Mun yong’s descendant founded Jeolgang Si clan and made Zhejiang, Jeolgang Si clan’s Bon-gwan.

== See also ==
- Korean clan names of foreign origin
