= Pareung Cho clan =

Korean clan from Hunan, China

- Country: Korea
- Current region: Hunan
- Founder: Cho Hae chang

The Pareung Cho clan (Korean: 파릉 초씨; Hanja: 巴陵 楚氏) is one of the Korean clans. Their Bon-gwan is in Yueyang, Hunan, which was once known as Baling (巴陵) or Pareung in Korean. Their founder was Cho Hae chang who was a member of the Hanlin Academy in Ming dynasty. He was exiled to Korea when Ming dynasty was destroyed by Qing dynasty. Cho Su myeong (Hanja: 楚壽命), a son of Cho Hae chang, founded Pareung Cho clan. He made Pareung Cho clan’s Bon-gwan which was Cho Hae chang’s hometown to escape from assassins and to hide in North Hamgyong Province.

== See also ==
- Korean clan names of foreign origin
