= Yonggang Paeng clan =

Korean clan from Nampo

- Country: Korea
- Current region: Gwangju
- Founder: Paeng Jeok

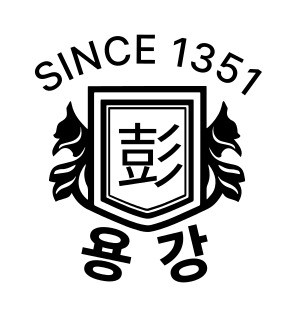

Yonggang Paeng clan (Korean: 용강 팽씨; Hanja: 龍岡 彭氏) was one of the Korean clans. Their Bon-gwan was in Ryonggang County, Nampo. According to the research in 2000, the number of Yonggang Paeng clan was 795. Their founder was Paeng Jeok. He was from Jiankang, China. He entered Goryeo as a fatherly master of Princess Noguk, an Imperial princess who had a marriage to an ordinary person. He was appointed as Grand Secretariat (Hanja: 內閣學士). Then, he became Prince of Yonggang (Hanja: 龍岡伯). His descendant began Yonggang Paeng clan.

== See also ==
- Korean clan names of foreign origin
