= Gyeongju Seop clan =

Korean clan from North Gyeongsang Province

- Country: Korea
- Current region: Gyeongju
- Founder: Seop Gong je

Gyeongju Seop clan (Korean: 경주 섭씨; Hanja: 慶州 葉氏) is one of the Korean clans. Their Bon-gwan is in Gyeongju, North Gyeongsang Province. According to the research held in 2000, the number of Gyeongju Seop clan's member was 285. Their founder was Seop Gong je who worked as a Counsellor Remonstrant (Hanja: 諫議大夫) and Hanlin Academy in Song dynasty. Seop Gong je exiled himself to Goryeo expecting confliction and was settled in Damyang County located in Jeolla Province. Then, Gojong of Goryeo gave a government post to Seop Gong je. Seop Gong je retired his active life in Gangneung located in Gangwon Province (historical) via Gyeongju in Gyeongsang Province because enemies in Yuan dynasty came near him. A descendant of Seop Gong je founded Gyeongju Seop clan and made Damyang County Gyeongju Seop clan's Bon-gwan because Damyang County was the first place he was settled in.

== See also ==
- Korean clan names of foreign origin
