= Dalseong Bin clan =

Korean clan from Daegu

- Country: Korea
- Current region: Suseong District
- Founder: Bin U gwang
- Website: http://www.binssi.or.kr/

Dalseong Bin clan (Korean: 수성 빈씨; Hanja: 壽城 賓氏) is one of the Korean clans. Their Bon-gwan is in Suseong District, Daegu. According to the research held in 2015, the number of Dalseong Bin clan’s member was 4208. Their founder was Bin U gwang who was a Hanlin Academy in Song dynasty. When Song dynasty was collapsed, he was naturalized in Goryeo having his valuable books. Then, he made contributions to developing academy. As a result, Chungsuk of Goryeo appointed Bin U gwang as Prince of Suseong.

== See also ==
- Korean clan names of foreign origin
