= Gwangdong Jin clan =

Korean clan from Guangdong, China

- Country: Korea
- Current region: Guangdong
- Founder: Chen Lin

The Gwangdong Jin clan (Korean: 광동 진씨; Hanja: 廣東 陳氏) is a Korean clan that originated around the end of the Ming dynasty (c. 17th century).

Their Bon-gwan or hometown is Guangdong (Korean: 광동; Hanja: 廣東; RR: Gwangdong), China. Their founder was Chen Lin, a Ming dynasty naval officer who helped defend Joseon Korea from Japanese invasions.

According to the research held in 2015, the number of the Gwangdong Jin clan was 2397.

== Chen Lin ==
Chen Lin was a general of Ming dynasty and leader of Ming navy, who helped defeat the Japanese and save Korea (see Japanese invasions of Korea). For repelling the Japanese, Chen Lin was worshipped by Chinese and Koreans as a national hero.

In 1644, when the Qing dynasty replaced the Ming, Chen's grandchild, Chen Yusong (陳泳素) migrated to Korea and started the Jin Clan.

== See also ==
- Korean clan names
