= Damyang Guk clan =

Korean clan from South Jeolla Province

- Country: Korea
- Current region: Damyang County
- Founder: Guk Ju
- Website: http://tamyangkook.com/main.htm

Damyang Guk clan (Korean: 담양 국씨; Hanja: 潭陽 鞠氏) is one of the Korean clans. Their Bon-gwan is in Damyang County, South Jeolla Province. According to the research held in 2015, the number of Damyang Guk clan’s member was 19089. Their founder was Guk Ju who was a Dafu (Hanja: 大夫) in Song dynasty. When Emperor Qinzong in Song dynasty revolted against Jin dynasty (1115–1234), he exiled himself to Goryeo in 1128. Then, Jin dynasty conquered Song dynasty, and Jin dynasty extorted connection and tribute. Injong of Goryeo handled this issue appointing Guk Ju as envoy and dispatched Guk Ju to demand the connection was unfair, so Guk Ju went back and forth between Goryeo and Jin dynasty. Guk Ju demanded it because of an order from the king. As a result, Injong of Goryeo became Prince of Chuseong (Hanja: 秋城君). Then, he founded Damyang Guk clan and made Damyang, Damyang Guk clan’s Bon-gwan.

== See also ==
- Korean clan names of foreign origin
