= Pareung Ho clan =

Korean clan from Fuzhou, China

Parung Ho clan
- Country: Korea
- Current region: Fuzhou
- Founder: Ho An guk

Parung Ho clan (Korean: 파릉 호씨; Hanja: 巴陵 胡氏) is one of the Korean clans. Their Bon-gwan is in Fuzhou, China. According to the research held in 1985, the number of Parung Ho clan's member was 1487. Their founder was Ho Geuk gi (Hanja: 胡克己) in Song dynasty. Ho Geuk gi (Hanja: 胡克己) was a son of Ho Sa pyo (Hanja: 胡士表), the 15 th descendant of Ho An guk. Ho Geuk gi (Hanja: 胡克己) officially began Parung Ho clan after he was naturalized in Korea instead of coming back to China because of Ming dynasty’s destruction by Qing dynasty. Before then, he worked as Hanlin Academy at the end of Ming dynasty and was dispatched to Korea as an envoy during Injo of Joseon’s reign.

== See also ==
- Korean clan names of foreign origin
