= Robert Holley (television personality) =

South Korean lawyer (born 1960)

Robert Bradley Holley
- Born: November 14, 1960 (age 65); Rancho Cucamonga, California, U.S.
- Citizenship: South Korea
- Occupations: Lawyer, founder and president of Gwangju Foreign School

Korean name
- Hangul: 하일
- Hanja: 河一
- RR: Ha Il
- MR: Ha Il

Robert Bradley Holley (born November 14, 1960), also known by the Korean name Ha Il (Korean: 하일), is a naturalized South Korean lawyer and television personality. A former U.S. citizen, Holley relinquished his birth citizenship in 1997 in order to take South Korean citizenship.

== Career ==
Born in California, USA, Holley first came to South Korea in 1978 as a Mormon missionary, remaining there for two years. He returned to the country in 1982 to study at Yonsei University, and after graduating from West Virginia University in 1987 with a J.D. degree, began pursuing a legal career in South Korea. He founded the Kwangju Foreign School in 1996. He began his rise to television stardom in the early 2000s, becoming well known for his spoken Korean which shows heavy influence from the Gyeongsang dialect spoken in his adopted hometown of Busan.

== Personal life ==
Holley is a descendant of William Bradford, one of the signatories of the Mayflower Compact. He is married to a South Korean woman, with whom he has three sons; the eldest was born in 1988. He decided to naturalize as a South Korean citizen in 1997, which required him to give up his U.S. citizenship. He has described this as a difficult decision, especially since at the time South Korea was not a member of the U.S. Visa Waiver Program; a U.S. consular official tried to discourage him from giving up citizenship, warning that he might not be able to get a visa to return to his country of birth, but Holley nevertheless decided to go through with it. A notice confirming his loss of U.S. citizenship was published in the Federal Register in February 1998. He is a close friend of Lee Joon-gi, who rose to fame in the mid-2000s as a film actor.

On April 10, 2019, Holley was arrested by the Cyber Investigation Division of the Gyeonggi-do Southern Region Police Department on the charge of using methamphetamines pursuant to the Narcotics Control Act. He was released the same day after a court ruled that he had a low chance of destroying evidence. His case was referred to the prosecution on May 1, 2019. On August 29, 2019, at the Seoul Western District Court, Holley was given a one-year prison sentence suspended for two years and 40 hours of drug treatment. The sentence took into consideration the fact that Holley had expressed regret for using methamphetamines.
