= Chonghae Yi clan =

Korean clan from South Hamgyong Province

- Country: Korea
- Current region: Pukchong County
- Founder: Yi Ji-ran
- Website: http://chonghae.byus.net/

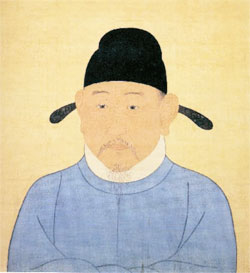
Yi Ji-ran

The Chonghae Yi clan (Korean: 청해 이씨; Hanja: 青海 李氏) is a Korean clan. Their Bon-gwan is in Pukchong County, South Hamgyong Province. Their ancestors are the Jurchen people. Their founder is Yi Ji-ran, an ethnic Jurchen general from the end of Goryeo to the beginning of the Joseon Dynasty (1331-1402). After Taejo of Joseon's death, Yi Ji-ran was chosen as a meritorious retainer and became the founder of the Chonghae Yi clan. As of 2000, the number of members this clan has is about 12002.

== See also ==
- Korean clan names of foreign origin
