= Miryang Dang clan =

Korean clan from South Gyeongsang Province

- Country: Korea
- Current region: Miryang
- Founder: Tang Seong

The Miryang Dang clan (Korean: 밀양 당씨; Hanja: 密陽 唐氏) is a Korean clans. Their Bon-gwan is in Miryang, South Gyeongsang Province. According to the census held in 2000, there were 1013 members of the Miryang Dang clan. Their founder was Dang Seong who was naturalized in Goryeo to avoid confliction in the end of Yuan dynasty. He was from Ningbo, Zhejiang, China. He was in charge of diplomacy as Gongjo (Hanja: 工曹). Then, he was appointed as Gongsin (Hanja: 功臣). After that, he worked as Minister of War (Hanja: 嘉善大夫) and mayor of Kyan (Hanja: 恭安府尹). He also got territory named Miryang. Finally, his descendant founded Miryang Dang clan and made their Bon-gwan Miryang.

== See also ==
- Korean clan names of foreign origin
