= Dugu (surname) =

Dugu (獨孤) is an extremely rare Chinese compound surname of Xianbei-ized Xiongnu origin. There is also a small Korean population (Namwon Dokgo clan) with this surname (stylized as Dokgo or Tokko (독고) in Korean); many of them are found in North Korea, mainly in Ryongchon County and Uiju County near the Chinese border.

During the 6th century the Dugus were a powerful aristocratic family based in northwest China. They are best remembered today by the Dugu sisters, whose marriages linked the imperial families of 3 successive dynasties — the Northern Zhou (557–581), Sui (581–618), and Tang (618–907).

Shimunek (2017) reconstructs Tabgach *dʊqʊ which underlaid Chinese transcription 獨孤, which was glossed as 劉 "battle-axe".

== Notable people ==
- Dugu Xin (503–557), Western Wei general and official
- Dugu sisters (6th century), Dugu Xin's daughters
  - Empress Dugu (Northern Zhou) (died 558), Emperor Ming of Northern Zhou (Yuwen Yu)'s empress
  - Dugu Qieluo (544–602), Emperor Wen of Sui (Yang Jian)'s empress
- Consort Dugu (died 775), Emperor Daizong of Tang (Li Chu)'s concubine
- Dugu Sun (died 905), Tang dynasty minister
- Dugu Qiubai, a fictional master swordsman that has been mentioned in several of Jin Yong's works.
