= Goesan Jeom clan =

Korean clan from North Chungcheong

Jeom clan of Goesan
- Country: Korea
- Current region: Goesan County

Jeom clan of Goesan (Korean: 괴산 점씨; Hanja: 槐山 占氏) was one of the Korean clans. Their Bon-gwan was in Goesan County, North Chungcheong Province. According to the research in 2000, the number of Jeom clan of Goesan was 107. Jeom clan of Goesan was a clan which was naturalized from Japan, but the detail of their founder is not clear.

== See also ==
- Korean clan names of foreign origin
