= Sangsan Lee clan =

Korean clan from North Gyeongsang Province

- Country: Korea
- Current region: Sangju
- Founder: Lee Min do

Sangsan Lee clan (Korean: 상산 이씨; Hanja: 商山 李氏) is one of the Korean clans. Their Bon-gwan is in Sangju, North Gyeongsang Province. According to the research held in 2000, the number of Sangsan Lee clan was 1379. Their founder was Lee Min do. Lee Min do was from Hejian, China, and he was naturalized in Goryeo to avoid confliction in Yuan dynasty. Lee Min do contributed to the foundation of Joseon Dynasty, and was awarded Joseon Dynasty Jwam-yeong Minister and Prince of Sangju. His descendant founded Sangsan Lee clan and made their Bon-gwan Sangju.

== See also ==
- Korean clan names of foreign origin
