= Suncheon Do clan =

Korean clan from South Jeolla Province

- Country: Korea
- Current region: Suncheon
- Founder: Do Gu won

Suncheon Do clan (Korean: 순천 도씨; Hanja: 順天 陶氏) is one of the Korean clans. Their Bon-gwan is in Suncheon, South Jeolla Province. According to the research held in 2015, the number of Suncheon Do clan's member was 829. Do clan was a clan came from Taotang (Hanja: 陶唐) in China. Their founder was Do Gu won who worked as a Jinshi (Hanja: 進士) in Yuan dynasty and entered Goryeo as a fatherly master of Princess Jeguk who had a marriage to an ordinary person planned by Chungnyeol of Goryeo in Goryeo. Then, Do Gu won was settled in Suncheon and founded Suncheon Do clan.

== See also ==
- Foreign clans in Korean
