= Yeonggam =

Korean honorific

- Hangul: 영감
- Hanja: 令監
- RR: yeonggam
- MR: yŏnggam

Yeonggam or Younggam (Korean: 영감; Hanja: 令監) is a nickname or Korean honorific for an old man in Korea. Yeonggam was historically an honorific title for second-level and third-level civil servants; Vice-Ministers, or Assistant Secretaries of Goryeo and Joseon.

Over time the word became an honorific or nickname for a judge, county governor, head of a township or old man. In recent years, yeonggam has come to be used primarily as a nickname for elderly men. Yeonggam has been used in Korea for more than a thousand years.

== History ==
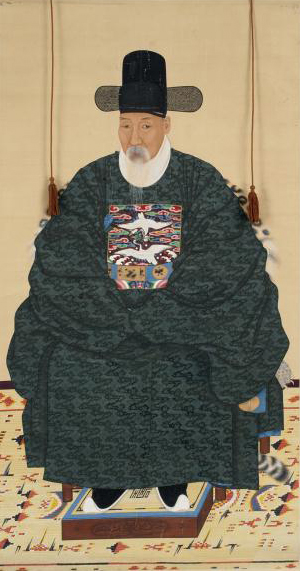
second-level civil servant of Joseon dynasty

Yeonggam was first used as an honorific for a lower level civil servants of the Goryeo Dynasty and Joseon dynasties, though the first instance of its use is unknown. Nyeonggam (녕감, 령감), was the first spelling used for this name, it was later changed to yeonggam. The term yeonggam comes after public office and peerage titles in a man's name. Yeonggam is a homograph. It is not only a title for elderly men, it means 'inspiration' in Korean.

In the Joseon dynasty, men over their 80th birthday were bestowed the honorary position Assistant Secretary. At their 90th birthday they were given the honorary position of Vice-Minister.

With the fall of Joseon, the position of Sang-gam (상감). Along with the change in the meaning of these positions, Korean patriarchal perspectives were added to the usages of yeonggam, which became a common designation; 1. When judges refer to each other 2. When others who are not judges refer to judges 3. When people refer to the mayor 4. When people refer to their elders 5. When women refer to their husbands.

After the Joseon dynasty, the use of yeonggam continued in Japan and Colonial Korea as an honorific for the position of country governor, judge, prosecutor, and district attorney.

=== Modern usage ===
After 1962, the Supreme Court of South Korea sought to eliminate the habit of using the term Yeonggam for judges since it was considered to be un-democratic. In modern Korea, Yeonggam is commonly used as a suffix that comes after the last name of elderly men.

During the Goryeo Dynasty and Joseon dynasties yeonggam followed one's title, in modern use yeonggam is used by itself.

== See also ==
- Goryeo
- Korean honorifics
- Seungji
- Yangban
