= Gangeum Dan clan =

Korean clan from North Hwanghae Province

- Country: Korea
- Current region: Kumchon County
- Founder: Dan Il ha

Gangeum Dan clan (Korean: 강음 단씨; Hanja: 江陰 段氏) is one of the Korean clans. Their Bon-gwan is in Kumchon County, North Hwanghae Province. According to the research held in 1985, the number of Gangeum Dan clan's member was 720. Their founder was Dan Il ha who was from Jiangyin. He passed Imperial examination in 1509 during Ming dynasty period, and worked as government official. His great-great-grandchild named Dan Hui sang (Hanja: 段希詳) was appointed as national Council. He was sent troops to Joseon as a leader of a reinforcements in Ming dynasty during Japanese invasions of Korea (1592–98) in 1597. He was settled in the place he was sent troops. Then he officially began Gangeum Dan clan and made Kumchon County, Gangeum Dan clan's Bon-gwan.

== See also ==
- Korean clan names of foreign origin
