= Yeongyang Cheon clan =

Korean clan from Shandong, China

- Country: Korea
- Current region: Ningyang County
- Founder: Cheon Am
- Connected members: Chun Woo-hee; Song Ji-hyo; Chun Jung-myung; Chun Myung-hoon; Cheon Ho-sun; Chun Ho-jin; Chun Jung-bae; Cheon Sang-byeong; Greg Chun

The Yeongyang Cheon clan (Korean: 영양 천씨; Hanja: 潁陽 千氏) is one of the Korean clans. Their Bon-gwan is in Ningyang County, Tai'an, Shandong, China, known as Yeongyang (Korean: 영양) in Korean. According to the research held in 2015, the number of Yeongyang Cheon clan's member was 100014. Their founder was Cheon Am in China. Cheon Am’s 9 th descendant dispatched Cheon Man-ri, a general in Ming dynasty, to Joseon to fight in Japanese invasions of Korea (1592–98). Cheon Man ri stayed in Joseon and was naturalized there without returning to his country after the war. Then, he founded the Yeongyang Cheon clan.

== See also ==
- Korean clan names of foreign origin
