= Ganghwa Wi clan =

Korean clan from Incheon

- Country: Korea
- Current region: Ganghwa County
- Founder: Wi Suyeo

Ganghwa Wi clan (Korean: 강화 위씨; Hanja: 江華 韋氏) is one of the Korean clans. Their Bon-gwan is in Ganghwa County, Incheon. According to the research held in 2000, the number of Ganghwa Wi clan’s member was 1805. Their founder was Wi Suyeo who came from Zhongyuan, China in 960. Wi Suyeo was appointed as munha sirang pyeongjangsa (문하시랑평장사; 門下侍郞平章事) during Mokjong of Goryeo’s reign. After that, he became a Palace Attendant and Prince of Ganghwa. His descendant was awarded land in Ganghwa, and made Ganghwa their Bon-gwan. Then, his descendant officially began Ganghwa Wi clan.

== See also ==
- Korean clan names of foreign origin
