= Sinpyong Ho clan =

Korean clan from South Chungcheong Province

Sinpyong Ho clan 신평 호씨
- Country: Korea
- Current region: Dangjin
- Founder: Ho Jun

Sinpyong Ho clan (Korean: 신평 호씨; Hanja: 新平 扈氏) is one of the Korean clans. Their Bon-gwan is in Dangjin, South Chungcheong Province. According to the research held in 1985, the number of the Sinpyong Ho clan was 3529. The founder was Ho Jun who was naturalized in Korea. Before that, he participated in the war named Japanese invasions of Korea (1592–98) as a vice general. He was served under Li Rusong, and he made some achievement during the war.

== See also ==
- Korean clan names of foreign origin
