= Jeolgang Seo clan =

Korean clan from Zhejiang, China

- Country: Korea
- Current region: Zhejiang
- Founder: Seo Hak

Jeolgang Seo clan (Korean: 절강 서씨; Hanja: 浙江 徐氏) is one of the Korean clans. Their Bon-gwan is in Zhejiang, China. According to the research held in 2000, the number of Jeolgang Seo clan’s member was 623. Their founder was Seo Hak who was a great-grandchild of Seo Hae ryong (Hanja: 徐海龍). Seo Hae ryong (Hanja: 徐海龍) was from Zhejiang and worked as Ministry of Rites (禮部, Lǐbù) in Ming dynasty. Seo Hak worked as a general and was dispatched to Joseon as Ming dynasty’s reinforcements. Then, he was settled in Seongju County, North Gyeongsang Province and founded Jeolgang Seo clan.

== See also ==
- Korean clan names of foreign origin
