= Jeolgang Jang clan =

Korean clan from Zhejiang, China

- Country: Korea
- Current region: Zhejiang
- Founder: Jang Hae bin

Jeolgang Jang clan (Korean: 절강 장씨; Hanja: 浙江 張氏) is one of the Korean clans. Their Bon-gwan is in Zhejiang, China. According to the research held in 2000, the number of Jeolgang Jang clan’s member was 3300. Their founder was Jang Hae bin who was from Hang Prefecture, Zhejiang. He was a general and was dispatched to Joseon as a follower of Wu Weizhong working as Ming dynasty general, but he was not able to come back to China because he was shot during Siege of Ulsan. As a result, he was naturalized in Joseon. After that, Jang Hae bin’s descendant officially began Jeolgang Jang clan and made Zhejiang, Jeolgang Jang clan’s Bon-gwan.

== See also ==
- Korean clan names of foreign origin
