= Dureung Du clan =

Korean clan from Shaanxi, China

Turung Tu clan
- Country: Korea
- Current region: Shaanxi
- Founder: Tu Gyeong nyeong

The Dureung Du clan (Korean: 두릉 두씨; Hanja: 杜陵 杜氏) is one of the Korean clans. Their Bon-gwan is in Duling (Dureung in Korean) County (Hanja: 杜陵縣), in modern Shaanxi, China. According to the research held in 2000, the number of Turung Tu clan’s member was 5701. Their founder was Tu Gyeong nyeong who lived in Jingzhao (Hanja: 京兆尹) and worked as the Minister of War in Song dynasty during Emperor Taizong of Song’s reign. Tu Gyeong nyeong appealed against Emperor Zhenzong’s royal succession. However, it brought Emperor Zhenzong’s anger and Tu Gyeong nyeong was demoted to Inspector (Hanja: 刺史). Tu Gyeong nyeong was naturalized in Goryeo with his sons named Tu Ji geon (Hanja: 杜之建) and Tu Ji Bong (Hanja: 杜之逢) who worked as Zhongshu Sheren (Hanja: 中書舍人) in 1004. After Mokjong of Goryeo bestowed the post named General of the Right (Hanja: 右將軍) and land in Gimje on Tu Gyeong nyeong, Tu Gyeong nyeong became Prince of Duling. Then, Tu Gyeong nyeong’s descendant founded Turung Tu clan.

== See also ==
- Korean clan names of foreign origin
