= Kaesong Bang clan =

Korean clan

- Country: Korea
- Founder: Pang Du-hyeon

The Kaesong Bang clan (Korean: 개성 방씨; Hanja: 開城龐氏) is a Korean clan. According to the census held in 2015, the population of the Kaesong Bang clan was 851. Their founder was Pang Du-hyeon who was a descendant of Pang I wei. Pang I wei was a general during the Zhou dynasty during the King Xian of Zhou’s reign. Pang Du-hyeon entered Goryeo as one of the Hanlin Academy when he worked as the government post named zhong shu she ren (simplified Chinese: 中书舍人; traditional Chinese: 中書舍人; pinyin: zhōng shū shè rén) in 1351. At that time, Princess Noguk had a marriage to an ordinary person planned by Gongmin of Goryeo.

== See also ==
- Korean clan names of foreign origin
