= Imgu Pung clan =

Korean clan from Shandong, China

- Country: Korea
- Current region: Linqu County
- Founder: Pung Sam sa

The Imgu Pung clan (Korean: 임구 풍씨; Hanja: 臨朐 馮氏) is a Korean clan (Bon-gwan). The clan was located in Linqu County, Weifang, Shandong, China.

According to research carried out in 2015, the Imgu Pung clan had 592 members. The clan was founded by Pung Samsa who belonged to the Linqu people of the Ming dynasty. When the Ming dynasty was replaced by the Qing dynasty, Pung Samsa was captured and detained in Shenyang. He was captured following his rebellion against the Qing dynasty, hoping to reinstate the Ming dynasty. Following his incarceration, he moved and was naturalized in Joseon with Hyojong of Joseon, who became a hostage during Qing invasion of Joseon.

== See also ==
- Korean clan names of foreign origin
