= Yonan In clan =

Korean clan from Hwanghae Province

- Country: Korea
- Current region: Yonan County
- Founder: In Hu

The Yonan In clan (Korean: 연안 인씨; Hanja: 延安 印氏) is a Korean clan. Their bon-gwan is in Yonan County, Hwanghae Province, in what is now North Korea. According to research conducted in 2000, the number of Yonan In clan’s members was 588. Their founder was In Hu who was a Mongolian and worked as civil servant. In Hu entered Goryeo as a bodyguard of Princess Jeguk, the daughter of Kublai Khan. The daughter had a marriage to an ordinary person planned by Chungnyeol of Goryeo.

== See also ==
- Korean clan names of foreign origin
