= Jenam Wang clan =

Korean clan from Shandong, China

- Country: Korea
- Current region: Jinan
- Founder: Wang Bong gang

The Jenam Wang clan (Korean: 제남 왕씨; Hanja: 濟南 王氏) is a Korean clan. Their bon-gwan is in Jinan, Shandong, China, also known as Jenam in Korean. According to the 2000 census, the Jinan Wang clan comprised 792 members. The clan originates from the Wang Bong gang from Jinan, China. The Shunzhi Emperor, of the Qing dynasty, detained the Wang Bong gang in Shenyang in an attempt to collapse the Wang clan, which descended from King Wen of Zhou. After that, the Wang Bong gang contrived to conquer the north area with Hyojong of Joseon, who was also captured in Shenyang by the Qing dynasty, specifically during the Qing invasion of Joseon. After Hyojong of Joseon was released, the Wang Bong gang returned and was naturalized in Joseon with Hyojong of Joseon. On Hyojong of Joseon's way back to Joseon, he brought nine Chinese persons back who were against the Qing dynasty because they had also been held captive.

== See also ==
- Korean clan names of foreign origin
