= Aneum Seomun clan =

Korean clan from South Gyeongsang Province

- Country: Korea
- Current region: Hamyang County
- Founder: Seomun Gi

The Aneum Seomun clan (Korean: 안음 서문씨; Hanja: 安陰 西門氏) is a Korean clan. Their bon-gwan is in Hamyang County, South Gyeongsang Province. According to the research held in 2015, the number of Seomun clan of Aneum was 1934. Seomun clan was a family name which has origin in Liang, China. Seomun clan has also origin of the name of a place that Scholar-official lived in Zheng during Eastern Zhou Period. Their founder was Seomun Gi from Henan who was a jinshi (Hanja: 進士) in Yuan dynasty. Seomun Gi entered Goryeo as a fatherly master when Princess Noguk had a marriage to an ordinary person planned by Gongmin of Goryeo. Seomun Gi was appointed as Prince of Hamyang. Seomun Gi’s descendant founded Seomun clan of Aneum and made Seomun clan of Aneum’s Bon-gwan Hamyang.

== See also ==
- Korean clan names of foreign origin
- Seomoon Tak (born 1978), South Korean singer
