= Soju Ga clan =

Korean clan from Jiangsu, China

- Country: Korea
- Current region: Suzhou
- Founder: Ga Yu-yak
- Connected members: Ka Sol-hyun; Ga Deuk-hee
- Website: http://www.gafamily.or.kr/

The Soju Ga clan (Korean: 소주 가씨; Hanja: 蘇州 賈氏) is one of the Korean clans. Their Bon-gwan is in Suzhou, Jiangsu, China, known as Soju (Korean: 소주) in Korean. According to the research conducted by the Korean government in 1985, there were 7894 members of the Soju Ga clan. Their founder was Ga Yu-yak who was a soldier dispatched by Ming dynasty’s Wanli Emperor to combat opponents in Japanese invasions of Korea (1592–98).

== See also ==
- Korean clan names of foreign origin
