= Hanam Jeong clan =

Korean clan from Henan, China

Henan Jeong clan
- Country: Korea
- Current region: Henan
- Founder: Jeong U

Henan Jeong clan (Korean: 하남 정씨; Hanja: 河南 程氏) is one of the Korean clans. Their Bon-gwan is in Henan, China. According to the research held in 2000, the number of Henan Jeong clan’s member was 7766. Their founder was Jeong U who worked as Minister of the Guards (Hanja: 衛尉) in Yuan dynasty during Toghon Temür’s reign. Jeong U entered Goryeo as a fatherly master with Kong Shao (Hanja: 孔紹) and 20 or more people when Princess Noguk had a marriage to an Goryeo royalty, later King Gongmin of Goryeo. Jeong U worked as In-palace equerry censors (Hanja: 殿中侍御史) during Chungjeong of Goryeo’s reign, granted High Merit Minister (Hanja: 壁上功臣) in 1352 and became Prince of Hansan. Jeong U’s descendant founded Henan Jeong clan and made Henan, Henan Jeong clan’s Bon-gwan.

== See also ==
- Korean clan names of foreign origin
