= Dalseong Ha clan =

Korean clan from Daegu

- Country: Korea
- Current region: Dalseong County
- Founder: Ha Heum

Dalseong Ha clan (Korean: 달성 하씨; Hanja: 達城 夏氏) is one of the Korean clans. Their Bon-gwan is in Dalseong County, Daegu. The population was 4052. The word Ha clan (夏) came from China and was not in common in Korea. Dalseong Ha clan was naturalized from Song dynasty to Goryeo, and there was some Ha clan members who naturalized recently. Their founder was Ha Heum who was a Grand Chief Controller (大都督) in Song dynasty. Ha Heum was naturalized in Goryeo during the Injong of Goryeo’s (1122-1146) reign and settled in Dalseong. Ha Yong was the children of Ha Heum’s. Ha Yong’s descendant made Dalseong their Bon-gwan.

== See also ==
- Korean clan names of foreign origin
