= Nangya Jeong clan =

Korean clan from Shandong, China

Nangya Jeong clan 낭야 정씨
- Country: Korea
- Current region: Langya
- Founder: Jeong Seon-gap

The Nangya Jeong clan (Korean: 낭야 정씨; Hanja: 瑯琊 鄭氏) is a Korean clan. Their Bon-gwan is in Langya, Shandong, China, known as Nangya (Korean: 낭야) in Korean. Their founder was Jeong Seon-gap who was from Langya, Shandong. He was a Jinshi (imperial examination) (進士) at the end of Ming dynasty.

== See also ==
- Korean clan names of foreign origin
