= Gachang =

- myeon
- Location within South Korea
- Coordinates: 35°48′08″N 128°37′25″E
- Country: South Korea
- Province: Daegu
- County: Dalseong County
- Administrative divisions: 12 legal ri, 117 ban

Area
  - Total: 111.27 km^{2} (42.96 sq mi)

Population (2004)
  - Total: 8,857
  - Density: 79.6/km^{2} (206/sq mi)

Korean name
- Hangul: 가창면
- Hanja: 嘉昌面
- RR: Gachang-myeon
- MR: Kach'ang-myŏn

Gachang-myeon (Korean: 가창면) is a myeon, or township in rural southeastern Daegu, South Korea. Part of Dalseong County, is separated from the urban center of Daegu by the ridgelines of Yongjibong and Apsan. These two mountains are separated by the narrow valley of the Sincheon, a tributary of the Nakdong which drains most of the township. The valley of the Sincheon also hosts the only roads that connect Gachang to central Daegu.

Gachang-myeon is ringed by mountains and threaded by narrow valleys. These include Biseulsan (1084 m) and Choejeongsan (889 m). This rugged topography makes it a favored destination for outings, both for mountain climbers and for those seeking only to enjoy the resort facilities in the Naengcheon valley. Heritage sites include the Nokdong Seowon, a seowon, and the Buddhist temple of Unheungsa.

To the south, Gachang is equally isolated by a line of low mountains that lie between it and Cheongdo county in Gyeongsangnam-do. Here the ridgeline is broken by the pass of Paljoryeong.

Gachang-myeon is the site of a major water supply facility for Daegu, the Gachang Dam.

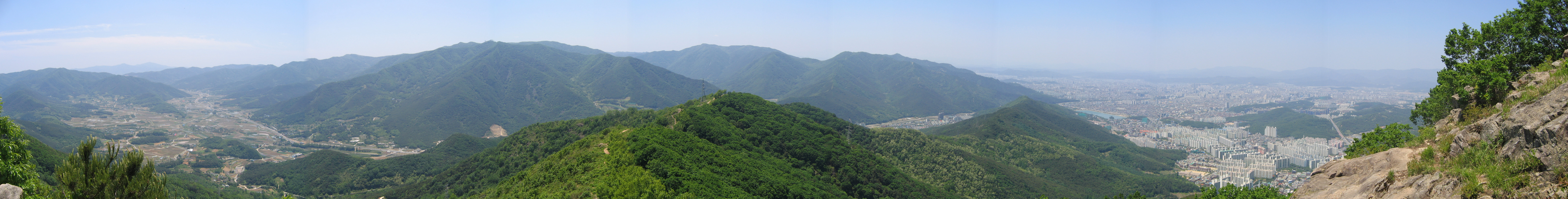
Panorama of Gachang and Suseong from 2005 at Yongjibong

== See also ==
- Geography of South Korea
- Administrative divisions of South Korea
