= Seoul Kang clan =

Korean clan from Seoul, South Korea

- Country: Korea
- Current region: Seoul
- Founder: Kang Soo-il

Seoul Kang clan (Korean: 서울 강씨; Hanja: 서울 姜氏) was one of the Korean clans. Their Bon-gwan was in Seoul. Their founder was Kang Soo-il. His father was in the United States Army and his mother was a Korean. He became the founder of Seoul Kang clan when he renewed his resident registration number to play soccer in Korea.

== See also ==
- Korean clan names of foreign origin
