= Juksan Eum clan =

Korean clan from Gyeonggi Province

- Country: Korea
- Current region: Anseong
- Founder: Eum jun

Juksan Eum clan (Korean: 죽산 음씨; Hanja: 竹山 陰氏) is one of the Korean clans. Their Bon-gwan is in Anseong, Gyeonggi Province. According to the research held in 2000, the number of members Juksan Eum clan had was 2260. Their founder was Eum jun. He entered Goryeo as a ministry of Rites (禮部, Lǐbù) with Princess Noguk who was a queen of Gongmin of Goryeo in Yuan dynasty. After that, 陰俊 became Prince of Juksan (Hanja: 竹山君). Eum jun’s descendant founded Juksan Eum clan and made Juksan, Juksan Eum clan’s Bon-gwan.

== See also ==
- Korean clan names of foreign origin
