= Haeju Seok clan =

Korean clan from Hwanghae Province

Haeju Seok clan 해주 석씨
- Country: Korea
- Current region: Haeju
- Founder: Seok Seong
- Members: Seok Seong, Seok Dam

Haeju Seok clan (Korean: 해주 석씨; Hanja: 海州 石氏) is one of the Bon-gwan or clans in South Korea. Established in the 17th century following the Japanese invasions of Korea, the clan eventually wielded significant political and economic influence due to its strong power base and control of iron production.

Currently, the Seok clan is concentrated in Haeju, Hwanghae Province. According to research conducted in 1985, the number of Haeju Seok clan's members was 2,664.

== Origin ==
The Haeju Seok clan can be traced to Seok Seong, a Chinese from Dongming County in the Wei Commandery (around present-day Handan, Hebei, China). He was a jinshi in the Ming dynasty during the Jiajing Emperor’s reign. He then worked as minister of public works and minister of defense.

Seok Seong played a role in the Ming intervention during the Japanese invasions in spite of opposition, an act for which he was executed due to Ming's difficulty in financing such an intervention. His eldest son Seok Dam (Hanja: 石潭) and his wife both settled in Haeju following his will, which was drafted when he was in jail. Seok Dam became Prince of Suyang (Hanja: 首陽君) and established the Haeju Seok clan.

== See also ==
- Korean clan names of foreign origin
