= Gyeongju Seol clan =

Korean clan from North Gyeongsang Province

- Country: Korea
- Current region: Gyeongju
- Founder: Seol Son
- Connected members: Seol Chong

Gyeongju Seol clan (Korean: 경주 설씨; Hanja: 慶州 偰氏) is a Korean clan. Their Bon-gwan is in Gyeongju, North Gyeongsang Province. As of 2000, the clan had a membership of 3,269 people. Their founder was Seol Son (died 1360), a descendant of a member of the Seol clan. That clan had an ancestor who was the Uyghur Khaganate's Finance Minister. They were naturalized in Goryeo, so as to not get involved with the Red Turban Rebellion. Their clan's name, "Seol" (偰), or Xue in Mandarin, originated from the fact that its ancestors lived on the Xueyanhe River (偰輦河江).

== See also ==
- Korean clan names of foreign origin
