= Imcheon Lee clan =

Korean clan from South Chungcheong Province

- Country: North and South Korea
- Current region: Buyeo County
- Founder: Yi Hyŏn

The Imcheon Lee clan (Korean: 임천 이씨; Hanja: 林川 李氏) is a Korean clan. Their bon-gwan is in Buyeo County, South Chungcheong Province. According to the census in 2000, the number of members in South Korea was 704. Their founder was Yi Hyŏn. He was an Uighur and was naturalized at the end of the Goryeo Dynasty. After visiting Nanjing as an interpreter for Goryeo, he was given territories in Imcheon as a reward, and began the Imcheon Lee clan.

== See also ==
- Korean clan names of foreign origin
