= Seol Chong =

Korean Confucian scholar (650–730)

- Hangul: 설총
- Hanja: 薛聰
- RR: Seol Chong
- MR: Sŏl Ch'ong

Art name
- Hangul: 빙월당
- Hanja: 氷月堂
- RR: Bingwoldang
- MR: Pingwŏltang

Courtesy name
- Hangul: 총지
- Hanja: 聰智
- RR: Chongji
- MR: Ch'ongji

Seol Chong (650 – 730 AD) was a leading scholar of the Unified Silla period from the Gyeongju Seol clan. He studied Confucian writings and the related Chinese classics. He is also known by the courtesy name Chongji and the pen name Bingwoldang.

Seol was the son of the prominent Buddhist figure Wonhyo and the Silla princess Yoseok, the daughter of King Muyeol. He was of head-rank six in Silla's bone rank system. An account of his life is found in the Samguk Sagi, yeoljeon (biographies), vol. 6 and his achievements are mentioned as well in the Samguk Yusa's account of Wonhyo (vol. 5).

Seol Chong is best remembered for regularizing the idu and gugyeol scripts, which were the first systems for representing the Korean language in Chinese characters. The idu script had been in use previous to Seol Chong, but had lacked rigorous principles. Early in his career Seol is also credited with composing a short Confucian parable on kingship entitled The Warning of the Flower King (화왕계/花王戒) for King Sinmun of Silla. This parable is either repeated or paraphrased in the Samguk Sagi, and influenced later writers of the Joseon period. A typically Confucian text, it criticizes monarchs for valuing pleasure-seeking over righteous rule.

Seol Chong is sometimes regarded as the progenitor of the Gyeongju Seol lineage. However, opinions on this differ, since the Seol family name is found as far back as the foundation of Silla.

He is also one of eighteen Korean Confucian sages who have been enshrined in the Korean National Confucian shrine.

== See also ==
- History of Korea
- Korean literature
- List of Korean philosophers
