= Namwon Seung clan =

Korean clan from North Jeolla Province

- Country: Korea
- Current region: Namwon
- Founder: Ming Sheng (明升; 1356–1391)

Namwon Seung clan (Korean: 남원 승씨; Hanja: 南原 昇氏) was one of the Korean clans. Their Bon-gwan was in Namwon, North Jeolla Province. According to the research in 2000, the number of Namwon Seung clan was 613. Their founder was Ming Sheng who was the second emperor of the short-lived Ming Xia dynasty of China. Ming Sheng changed his surname from Ming clan to Seung clan after he exiled himself in Goryeo.

The Chinese Ming Xia emperor Ming Yuzhen's son Ming Sheng was given the noble title Marquis of Guiyi by the Ming dynasty emperor Zhu Yuanzhang after his surrender. Ming Sheng was then exiled to Korea and Zhu Yuanzhang asked the Korean king to treat him as a foreign noble by giving his descendants and family corvée and taxation exemptions. These were granted by a patent from the Korean king which lasted until the invading soldiers in the Qing invasion of Joseon destroyed the Ming family's patents. The Korean official Yun Hui-chong's daughter would marry Ming Sheng in March 1373. Ming Sheng was 17 when he were sent to Korea in 1372 by the Ming dynasty. The Chinese Ming family exists as the Korean clans, Yeonan Myeong clan, Seochok Myeong clan and Namwon Seung clan.

== See also ==
- Korean clan names of foreign origin
- Yeonan Myeong clan
- Seochok Myeong clan
