= Seochok Myeong clan =

Korean clan from Sichuan, China

- Country: Korea
- Current region: Sichuan
- Founder: Ming Yuzhen
- Connected members: Myung Se-bin

Seochok Myeong clan (Korean: 서촉 명씨; Hanja: 西蜀 明氏) is one of the Korean clans. Their Bon-gwan is in Sichuan, China. According to the research held in 2015, the number of Seochok Myeong clan's member was 27133. Their founder was Ming Yuzhen who established the short-lived Ming Xia dynasty in Sichuan, China in 1362. Ming Sheng, a son of Ming Yuzhen, succeeded the throne in 1366, but he submitted to the Hongwu Emperor in 1371. Then, Ming Sheng was naturalized in Goryeo with his mother named Ms. Peng and his 27 family members.

The Chinese Ming Xia emperor Ming Yuzhen's son Ming Sheng was given the noble title Marquis of Guiyi by the Ming dynasty emperor Zhu Yuanzhang after his surrender. Ming Sheng was then exiled to Korea and Zhu Yuanzhang asked the Korean king to treat him as a foreign noble by giving his descendants and family corvée and taxation exemptions. These were granted by a patent from the Korean king which lasted until the invading soldiers in the Qing invasion of Joseon destroyed the Ming family's patents. The Korean official Yun Hui-chong's daughter would marry Ming Sheng in March 1373. Ming Sheng was 17 when he was sent to Korea in 1372 by the Ming dynasty. The Chinese Ming family exists as the Korean clans, Yeonan Myeong clan, Seochok Myeong clan and Namwon Seung clan.

== See also ==
- Korean clan names of foreign origin
- Yeonan Myeong clan
- Namwon Seung clan
