= Nokdong Seowon =

Seowon in Daegu, South Korea

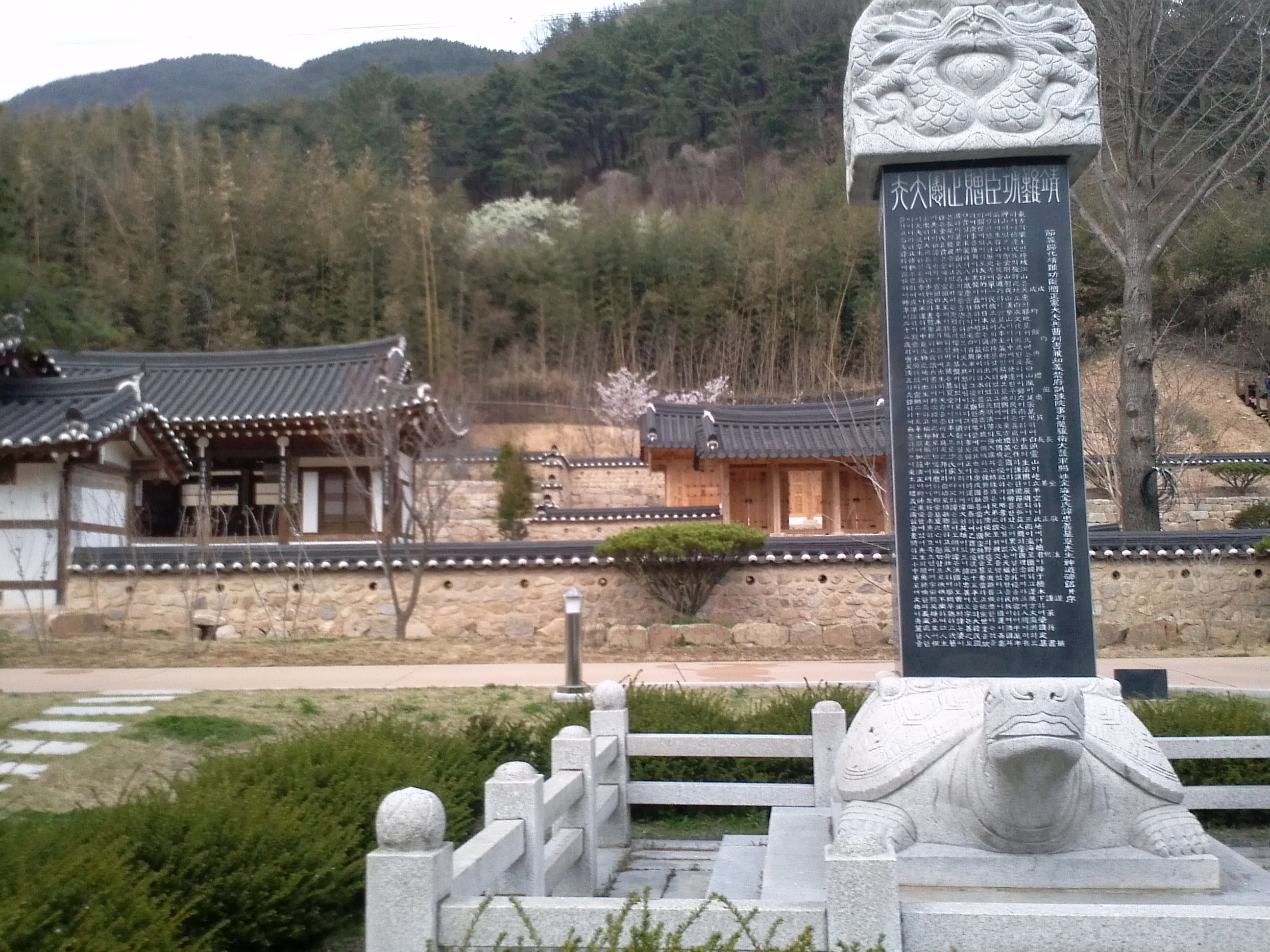

Korean name
- Hangul: 녹동서원
- RR: Nokdong seowon
- MR: Noktong sŏwŏn

The Nokdong Seowon (Korean: 녹동서원) in Urok-ri, Gachang-myeon, Daegu, South-Korea was erected in 1789 to worship the memory of Kim Chung-seon (1571–1642), a Japanese general who defected to Korea during the Japanese invasion (1592–1598). This seowon was abolished in 1864 as part of the regent Daewon-gun's general campaign against the seowons, but was reestablished in 1914 under the Japanese colonial regime. The Nokdong Seowon remains as a popular destination for Japanese tourists in Daegu.
