= Namwon Dokgo clan =

Korean clan from North Jeolla Province

- Country: Korea
- Current region: Namwon
- Founder: Dokgo Gongsun

Namwon Dokgo clan (Korean: 남원 독고씨; Hanja: 南原 獨孤氏) is one of the Korean clans. Their Bon-gwan is in Namwon, North Jeolla Province. According to research conducted in 2000, the number of Namwon Dokgo clan members was 452. Their founder was Dokgo Gongsun who was from Henan. Dokgo Gongsun was one of the Eight Scholars (Hanja: 八學士) in Tang dynasty and was naturalized at the end of Silla. Dokgo Sin (Hanja: 獨孤信), a descendant of Dokgo Gongsun, became Prince of Namwon. Then, Dokgo Sin (Hanja: 獨孤信) founded Namwon Dokgo clan with Namwon as their Bon-gwan.

== See also ==
- Korean clan names of foreign origin
