= Kwangju Foreign School =

Location
- 106 Samso-ro Oryong-dong, Buk-gu; Gwangju; South Korea
- 35.232976°N 126.847500°E

Information
- Type: Private
- Motto: Character and Knowledge
- Established: 1999
- President: Robert Holley
- Principal: Marcus Kotze
- Staff: 7
- Faculty: 15
- Grades: Pre-kindergarten to grade 12
- Enrollment: 50
- Colors: Gray, Blue, White
- Athletics conference: South Korea Activities Conference
- Mascot: Cougar
- Website: www.kwangjufs.org

Kwangju Foreign School is an international school in the city of Gwangju, South Korea. It was opened in response to city officials needing an international school to attract foreign business.

== School Philosophy and Curriculum ==
Students attend international schools because the classes are taught in English, and to gain acceptance into colleges and universities in the U.S. The course curriculum is therefore identical to that of U.S high schools, and counseling services in the schools provide the students with direction as to the appropriate activities to be involved in and the preparation necessary for the special entrance exams for non-native English speakers. The school is accredited by the Western Association of Schools and Colleges (WASC). The school has an ESL teacher to support students with limited English skills.

== Teaching staff and administration ==
The teaching staff at Korean International private schools are on what are called E-7 visas as opposed to the E-2 visas (visas issued to English teachers at educational institutes (hagwon) or public schools). The issuance of E-7 visas now requires that applicants have 2 years of relevant experience. There are 3 elementary school teachers, 4 middle school teachers, 4 high school teachers, 1 art teacher, 1 Chinese teacher, 1 music teacher, and 1 ESL teacher. Chinese is the foreign language currently offered.

== Location and Facilities ==
In August 2012, KFS moved to a newly built campus in Oryong-dong, Buk-gu, on the outskirts of the city of Gwangju just north of Gwangju Institute of Science and Technology.

Facilities include a gymnasium that includes a half basketball court, music room for orchestra, library, computer lab, multipurpose room, and cafeteria. Outdoor facilities include a full basketball court, playground, and soccer field.

== Activities ==
KFS is one of the founding members of the South Korean Athletic Conference (SKAC), which includes international schools in Busan, Daejeon, Sacheon, Pohang, and Jeonju. KFS student-athletes compete with other SKAC schools in volleyball, basketball, soccer, and cross-country at tournaments scheduled throughout the school year. In addition, KFS participates in academic SKAC events like the Spelling Bee, Model United Nations, and the Fine Arts Festival.

Teachers are very active in involving the students in cultural extracurricular activities. Organized extracurricular clubs have included dance, drama club, and orchestra. The performing arts groups are regular fixtures in the school's concerts, and talent shows. Students in grades 11 and 12 who demonstrate excellent scholarship, leadership, service, and character may be admitted to the KFS chapter of the National Honor Society.
