= Geochang Yoo clan =

Korean clan from South Gyeongsang Province

- Country: Korea
- Current region: Geochang County
- Founder: Yoo Jeon

Geochang Yoo clan (Korean: 거창 유씨; Hanja: 居昌 劉氏) is one of the Korean clans. Their bon-gwan is in Geochang County, South Gyeongsang Province. According to the research held in 1985, the number of Geochang Yoo clan's member was 32790. Their founder was Yoo Jeon who was 41 th children of Emperor Gaozu of Han, Han dynasty’s first emperor. Yoo Jeon was good at Neo-Confucianism and writing. Yoo Jeon worked as the minister of defense (兵部尚書, Bingbu Shangshu), a government post, in Song dynasty and entered Goryeo as one of Eight Scholars (Hanja: 八學士) in 1082. Then, he was settled in Gyeongsang Province.

== See also ==
- Korean clan names of foreign origin
