= Choejeongsan =

Mountain in Daegu, South Korea

Highest point
- Elevation: 905 m (2,969 ft)
- Coordinates: 35°46′N 128°36′E

Geography
- Location: South Korea

Korean name
- Hangul: 최정산
- Hanja: 最頂山
- RR: Choejeongsan
- MR: Ch'oejŏngsan

Choejeongsan (Korean: 최정산) is a mountain in Daegu, South Korea. It can be found in Dalseong County, in the western part of the city. Choejeongsan has an elevation of 905 m (2,969 ft).

== See also ==
- List of mountains in Korea
