= Seungji =

Seungji(in Hangul:승지, in Hanja:承旨) was the term for "royal secretary" or "recipient of edicts" during late Goryeo dynasty and Joseon. Other names were Seungseon (in Hangul:승선, in Hanja:承宣), Yonghoo(용후, 龍喉)

In the era of Goryeo, Munjong designated 4 personnel in charge of dealing with commands of the king, of which official term became transformed from Seungseon to Seungji later in 1276 during the reign of King Chungnyeol. The highest-rank official of Seungji is called Doseungji(Jijoosa or Jishinsa) whose workplace was separated in spite of becoming the member of central Cabinet. Core duty of Seungji was to work independently without any interference of other subjects out of political pressure.

Later in 1400 of Joseon, Seungjeongwon (in Hangul:승정원) where Seungji belonged to become an independent organ after three major organs came to remain as three of chief organs.

== Duties ==
The official assignments they had were concerning recipients of the king. In fact, however, they had a lot of power over the affairs of the state, administerng 6 major divisions of the government, treating foreign envoys or going out for work outside the palace. Royal recipients were important not only the medium of King and other bureaucrats but also deciding if several appeals to the Throne can be conveyed. They could also review memorials having been written from certain division with a view to helping the King and giving advice upon the issue.

== See also ==
- Yeong-gam
