= Urok Kim clan =

Korean clan from South Gyeongsang Province

- Country: Korea
- Current region: Gimhae
- Founder: Sayaka
- Connected members: Kim Jung-hwa; Kim Ki-bum (Key)

The Urok Kim clan (Korean: 우록 김씨; Hanja: 友鹿 金氏), officially the Gimhae Kim clan (Korean: 김해 김씨; Hanja: 金海 金氏), is a Korean clan descended from Kim Chung-seon, a general in the Japanese forces that invaded Korea in 1592.

He defected to the Korean side and fought against the Japanese invaders. He became a Korean citizen and was given the name Kim Chung-seon, official rank, the land of Gachang located in the suburbs of Daegu, and the ancestral seat (bon-gwan) of Gimhae. Kim Chung-seon married the daughter of the lord of Jinju in South Gyeongsang Province.

While officially known the Gimhae Kim clan, the clan is commonly known as the Urok Kim clan or the Saseong Gimhae Kim clan (Korean: 사성 김해 김씨; Hanja: 賜姓 金海 金氏) to distinguish it from the other Gimhae Kim clan descended from King Suro. The term saseong means that it was a surname given by the king. The clan has 7000 members.

== See also ==
- Korean clan names of foreign origin
