= Hwasun Song clan =

Korean clan from South Jeolla Province

- Country: Korea
- Current region: Hwasun County
- Founder: Song Gil man

The Hwasun Song clan (Korean: 화순 송씨; Hanja: 和順 松氏) is a Korean clan. Their bon-gwan is in Hwasun County, South Jeolla Province. According to the research held in 2000, the number of the Song clan of Hwasun was 4643. Their founder was Song Gil Man who was an orphan in Japan. When he was 18 years old, he came to Busan by ship. He became a founder of Song clan of Hwasun using the name of Matsuyoshi (Hanja: 松吉) because he did not know the name of his parents. He used the name of Song clan (Hanja: 松氏), because he was called Matsuyoshi (Hanja: 松吉).

== See also ==
- Korean clan names of foreign origin
