= Songjin Jeup clan =

Korean clan from North Hamgyong Province

Seongjin Jeup clan
- Country: Korea
- Current region: Kimchaek
- Founder: Jeup Gan-bu

Seongjin Jeup clan (Korean: 성진 즙씨; Hanja: 城津 辻氏) is one of the Korean clans. Their Bon-gwan is in Kimchaek, North Hamgyong Province. According to the research held in 2000, the number of Jeup clan of Seongjin was 86. Their founder was Jeup Gan-bu, who was born between a Korean mother and a Japanese father. Jeup Gan-bu was dispatched to Korea as an employee of a railroad company when Korea was colonized by Japan. Jeup Gan-bu was naturalized in 1954 while in his teenage years, following his mother. At that time, Jeup Gan-bu founded Jeup clan of Seongjin.

== See also ==
- Korean clan names of foreign origin
