= Yonan Myung clan =

Korean clan from Hwanghae Province

- Country: Korea
- Current region: Yonan County
- Founder: Ming Yuzhen
- Connected members: Myung Se-bin

Yonan Myung clan (Korean: 연안 명씨; Hanja: 延安 明氏) is one of the Korean clans. Their bongwan is in Yonan County, Hwanghae Province.

According to the research held in 2015, the number of Yonan Myung clan’s member was 27133. Their founder was Ming Yuzhen who established the short-lived Ming Xia dynasty in Sichuan, China in 1362.

== History ==
Ming Sheng was a son of Ming Yuzhen and succeeded Ming Yuzhen’s crown in 1366, but Ming Sheng knuckled under Ming dynasty's Hongwu Emperor in 1371 and was naturalized in Goryeo leading his 27 family members with his mother named Ms. Peng in the following year.

Ming Sheng's descendant was called Seochok Myeong clan. Ming Yuzhen was Seochok Myeong clan’s founder, and Sichuanwas Seochok Myeong clan’s bongwan. Their branch family founded Yonan Myung clan and made Yonan Myung clan’s bongwan Yonan County.

The Chinese Ming Xia emperor Ming Yuzhen's son Ming Sheng was given the noble title Marquis of Guiyi by the Ming dynasty emperor Zhu Yuanzhang after his surrender. Ming Sheng was then exiled to Korea, and Zhu Yuanzhang asked the Korean king to treat him as a noble by giving his descendants and family corvée and taxation exemptions. These were granted by a patent from the Korean king which lasted until the Qing invasion of Joseon destroyed the Ming family.

In March 1373, Ming Sheng married the daughter of a Korean official Yun Hŭi-chong (윤희종; 尹熙宗).

During the Yuan-Ming transition, at least two Chinese nobles were sent to Korea to start families: Ming Sheng of Daxia and Chen Li of Chen Han. Whereas Ming founded the Myeong clan, Chen founded the Yangsan Jin clan.

Ming Sheng was 17 and Chen Li was 21 when they were sent to Korea in 1372 by the Ming dynasty.

The Chinese Ming family exists as the Korean clans, Yonan Myung clan, Seochok Myeong clan and Namwon Seung clan.

== See also ==
- Korean clans of foreign origin
- Seochok Myeong clan
- Namwon Seung clan
