= Kye Yong-mook =

South Korean writer

- Born: September 8, 1904
- Died: August 9, 1961 (aged 56)
- Writing career
- Language: Korean

Korean name
- Hangul: 계용묵
- Hanja: 桂鎔默
- RR: Gye Yongmuk
- MR: Kye Yongmuk

Kye Yong-mook (Korean: 계용묵; September 8, 1904 – August 9, 1961) was a South Korean writer.

== Life ==
Kye Yong-mook, was born Ha Taeyong on September 8, 1904, in Seoncheon, Pyeonganbuk-do, Korea. Kye was educated at Sambong Public Normal School and took his collegiate education at Toyo University in Japan. Kye's first published work was the poem “The Shattered Schoolroom” (Geulbang-i kkae-eojyeo) which was published in the youth magazine New Voice (Sae sori) in 1920. In 1925, Kye won the Coming of Age (Saengjang) literary contest with his poem “O Buddha and Divine Spirits, Spring has Come.”

Kye transferred his attention to short fiction with the publication in 1927 of “Mr. Choi” (Choi seobang) in Joseon Literary World (Joseon Mundan), after which he never returned to writing poetry. Like many authors of the era including Yi Sang, he was imprisoned by the Japanese colonial government in August 1943 on charges of “displaying inadequate reverence for the emperor.”After Korean Liberation, Kye struggled to maintain a non-partisan position in the atmosphere of growing ideological strife in the Korean literary world. Kye died in 1961 in the middle of serializing the novel Seolsujip in the journal Contemporary Literature (Hyeondae munhak). His story, "Adada the Idiot," was also made into a movie by director Im Kwon-taek.

== Work ==
The Literature Translation Institute of Korea summarizes Kang's work:

Kye Yongmuk’s early works of fiction ... evince the influence of socialist thought. Both depict the plight of tenant farmers under vicious exploitation by landlords. When Kye Yongmuk returned to the literary world after a hiatus, however, it was no longer from the leftist perspective that he approached his subject matter. “Adada the Idiot” (Baekchi Adada), published in 1935, clearly bears the marks of this shift. A story of a mentally handicapped woman, the text offers a critique of contemporary social mores and the all-encompassing pursuit of material gain, but the economic question is reduced to the level of basic human greed rather than analyzed in terms of class conflict. In subsequent works, Kye Yongmuk began to focus more on the art of writing and appealed to mysticism and complex symbology. Desire for material possessions continued to be deplored as the root of much evil in such stories as “Chicken Painted on Folding Screen” (Byeongpunge geurin dagi), “Geumsun and the Chicken” (Geumsuni wa dak), and “The Pack Horses Driver” (Mabu), but the characters in these texts find that they have no choice but to accede to this desire in order to maintain their livelihood. Rather vague in tone, these works differ from his earliest stories in that they lack historical awareness and portray common people merely as objects for contemplation. Nonetheless, they reveal increasing refinement of Kye Yongmuk’s artistic technique, a trend that continues in his post-Liberation works, including “Counting the Stars” (Byeoreul henda), “The Wind Still Blows” (Barameun geunyang bulgo), and “Water Cicadas” (Mulmaemi). Kye Yongmuk is remembered as a writer who contributed (primarily in 1930s) to stylistic, technical and formal refinement of the modern Korean short story.

== Works in Korean (partial) ==
- “Mr. Choi”
- “The Landlord with a Human Aspect”
- “Adada, the Idiot”
- “Chicken Painted on Folding Screen”
- “Geumsun and the Chicken”
- “Counting the Stars"
- “The Wind Still Blows”
