= Korean clans of foreign origin =

Korean clans with non-Korean founders

Korean clans of foreign origin (Korean: 한국의 외래 귀화 성씨) refers to Korean clans (also "bon-gwan") that claim descent from a progenitor of foreign origin, based on genealogical records.

== Authenticity ==
The ancestral origins of many Korean clans of foreign origin cannot be historically verified outside of a clan's own genealogical records: the ones from the Joseon period, as well as several from the Goryeo period, can be considered historical and factual, but the ones dating before the Goryeo period are impossible to confirm. The adoption of clans and progenitors of Chinese origin was rare during the Three Kingdoms and Later Silla periods, but increased during the Goryeo period, despite clans not having actual historical connections to China, due to admiration and emulation of Chinese culture. There were some Korean clans that had an actual progenitor of Chinese origin, but many others made ancestral connections to China without any historical basis; most Korean clans that claim descent from Jizi, the Han dynasty, or immigrants from China during the Three Kingdoms or Later Silla periods are not supported by historical records and were founded mostly by Goryeo people. This phenomenon of linking clans to a progenitor of Chinese origin without any historical basis continued into the Joseon period. Korean clans originating from the Song, Yuan and Ming dynasties that immigrated during the Goryeo period have ample details to support a Chinese origin, unlike pre-Goryeo clans.

In South Korea, there are a total of 286 Korean family names, roughly half of which are of foreign origin (mostly Chinese), and 4,179 clans (bon-gwan). Out of the 286 Korean family names, the top 10 account for 64.1 percent of the population of South Korea: of those 10, three lay claim to a progenitor of Chinese origin, and account for 5.8 percent of the population. However, according to Jin Guanlin, the ancestral origins of those three family names of Chinese origin are "nearly impossible" to verify. Although many Korean clans claim to be of Chinese origin, the number of legitimately foreign Korean clans (i.e. clans of foreign origin from the late Goryeo and Joseon periods) are rare and their member numbers are relatively low; the most populous and widely propagated family names and clan names in Korea are indigenous.

=== Criticism ===
According to historian Han Hong-koo of Sungkonghoe University, "About 40 to 50 percent of Korean family names are probably 'naturalized family names', but to say that there are actually that many naturalized families is not true. The book that contains the most lies is probably the jokbo (genealogy book)." Han continues that 100 years ago, only 15 to 20 percent of Koreans were registered in genealogy books, but today genealogy books have become completely ubiquitous.

== Immigration ==
According to Jin Guanlin, "It can be said that from the end of the Chinese Warring States period to the Northern and Southern Dynasties, many Chinese moved to Manchuria and the Korean peninsula, blended among the indigenous people, and over time forgot about their Chinese origins." Many scholars came from China during the Western and Eastern Jin, Northern and Southern dynasties, Sui, and Tang periods. Large-scale immigration from China diminished greatly during the Later Silla period, but resumed during the Goryeo period by people escaping turmoil in China. Many northern Chinese fled to Korea during the transition period between Yuan and Ming. There was little immigration from China during the first half of the Joseon period, but many Han Chinese settled in Korea during the Imjin War as well as during the fall of Ming. Many scholars came from the Ming to escape the Qing during the 17th century.

According to Park Cheol-hee of Gyeongin National University of Education, 238,000 immigrants naturalized during the Goryeo period. According to Professor Park's analysis, the breakdown is as follows: 122,268 Balhae refugees, 97,662 of Jurchen descent, 13,273 of Yuan descent, 4,072 of Khitan descent, 348 of Japanese descent, and 184 of Chinese descent. Among them, many naturalized Han Chinese became bureaucrats thanks to their knowledge in international affairs and literature, and naturalized Balhae people made great achievements during the Goryeo–Khitan War against the Liao dynasty. Yi Won, who taught Ch'oe Mu-sŏn how to manufacture gunpowder, came from Jiangnan, China. Naturalized Jurchens of the Goryeo period reported on the state of the North, constructed fortresses, and some attained high government positions through military achievements, such as Go Yeol. Yi Seong-gye, the founder of the Joseon dynasty, was born in the northeast region and supported by the Jurchens of the region, such as Yi Ji-ran, who contributed to the founding of Joseon and played an important role in improving relations between Joseon and Jurchens of the Northeast.

Approximately 18 clans were founded by people of various ethnicities from the Yuan dynasty accompanying Mongol princesses who came to Goryeo to marry Korean kings. Many Jurchens and Manchus immigrated to Korea and established clans, according to Goryeo and Joseon records, but in modern times only one clan continues to claim Jurchen ancestry. Records from the History of Goryeo and the Annals of the Joseon Dynasty reveal that Japanese immigrants became naturalized in 999, 1012, 1039, 1425, 1426, and 1435; they were bestowed Korean clans, but most of them have been lost.

== China ==
Only clans with Chinese ancestors in the Goryeo period and after are included in this list. While several clans claimed a Chinese progenitor dating before the Goryeo dynasty, it is unlikely they were actually from China.

- Chungju Ji clan
- Hamjong Eo clan
- Hampyeong Mo clan
- Hyeonpung Gwak clan
- Ganghwa Wi clan
- Geochang Shin clan
- Geochang Yoo clan
- Gyeongju Seop clan
- Gwangcheon Dong clan
- Neungseong Gu clan
- Miryang Dang clan
- Boseong Seon clan
- Sangsan Lee clan
- Sinan Joo clan
- Sinchang Pyo clan
- Suan Gye clan
- Taean Lee clan
- Danyang Woo clan
- Damyang Guk clan
- Dalseong Bin clan
- Dalseong Ha clan
- Dureung Du clan
- Yangsan Jin clan
- Yeoheung Min clan
- Yeonan Myeong clan
- Yeongsan Shin clan
- Yeoyang Jin clan
- Anum Seomun clan
- Cheongju Yang clan
- Juksan Eum clan
- Hanam Jeong clan
- Wonju Byeon clan
- Hoesan Gam clan
- Kaesong Ro clan
- Kaesong Pang clan
- Geoje Ban clan
- Gokbu Gong clan
- Goksan Yeon clan
- Geumseong Beom clan
- Suncheon Do clan
- Yonggang Paeng clan
- Gyeongju Ping clan
- Jinju Nang clan
- Jeolgang Jang clan
- Jeolgang Pyeon clan
- Jeolgang Seo clan
- Jeolgang Si clan
- Sinpyong Ho clan
- Haeju Seok clan
- Gangeum Dan clan
- Ganghwa Man clan
- Gwangdong Jin clan
- Pareung Cho clan
- Pareung Ho clan
- Sanggok Ma clan
- Soju Ga clan
- Yeongyang Cheon clan
- Imgu Pung clan
- Nangya Jeong clan
- Jenam Wang clan

=== Uyghur ===
- Gyeongju Sol clan
- Imcheon Lee clan
- Deoksu Jang clan

=== Jurchen ===
- Cheonghae Lee clan

== Vietnam ==
- Hwasan Lee clan
- Jeongseon Lee clan

== Mongolia ==
- Yonan In clan

== Japan ==
- Urok Kim clan
- Hambak Kim clan
- Mangjeol
- Hwasun Song clan
- Songjin Jeup clan
- Goesan Jeom clan

== Netherlands ==
- Byeongyeong Nam clan

== United States ==
- Seoul Kang clan
- Yeongdo Ha clan

== Tajikistan ==
- Guri Shin clan
