= Euljiro =

Street in Seoul, South Korea

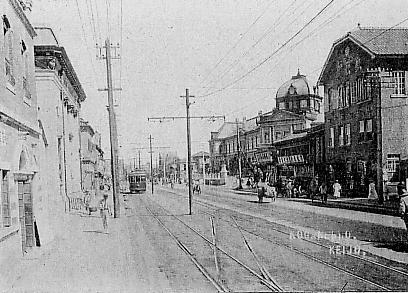
- Eulji-Road during the period of Japanese rule

Korean name
- Hangul: 을지로
- Hanja: 乙支路
- RR: Euljiro
- MR: Ŭlchiro

Euljiro (Korean: 을지로) is an avenue in Seoul named after Ŭlchi Mundŏk, the general who saved Korea from the invading Sui dynasty of China. During the period of Japanese rule, the street was known as Kogane-Cho (황금정; 黄金町).

Euljiro starts at 97-3 Sogong-dong, Jung-gu, Seoul (서울 중구 소공동), and reaches 224-2, Sindang-dong, Jung-gu (중구 신당동), and is the name of Beopjeong-dong (법정동).

== Industry ==
=== Printing alley ===
During the Joseon dynasty there was a public type foundry Jujaso in area that is now known as Chungmuro. In 1883 Park Mun-guk, Korea’s first modern printing house was built to what is now Euljiro 2-ga. In the following year Gwanginsa, the first private printing company was founded. Today the long and narrow alley leading from Chungmuro to Euljiro became a printing alley where various printing business concentrated. Out of 18,523 printing-related businesses nationwaie, 5,492 are located in Jung District, Seoul which is 29.6% of the nationwide total. More than a quarter of the nations printing businesses are concentrated in this district.

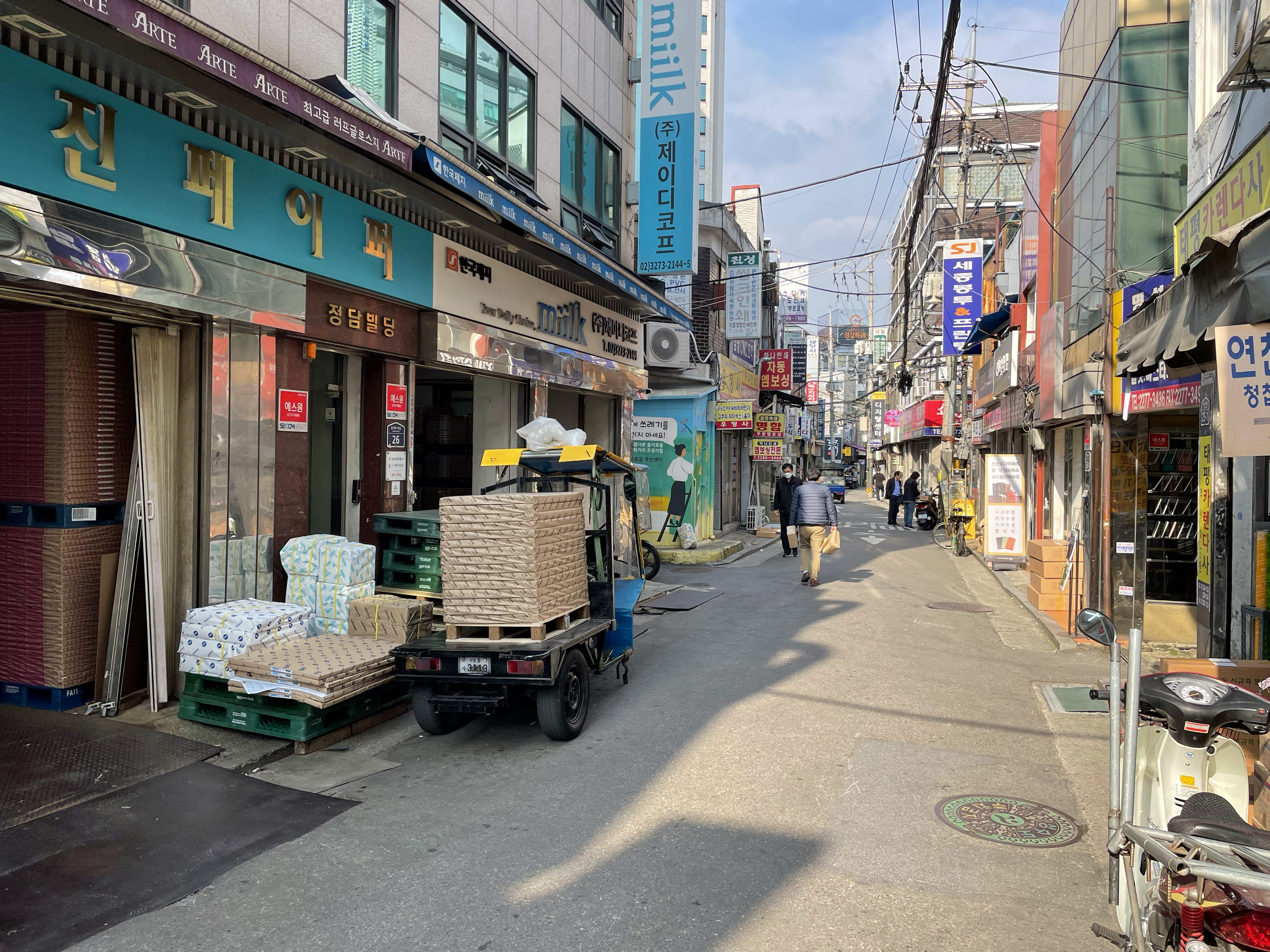
Paper delivery packed in front of the shop of a paper wholesaler

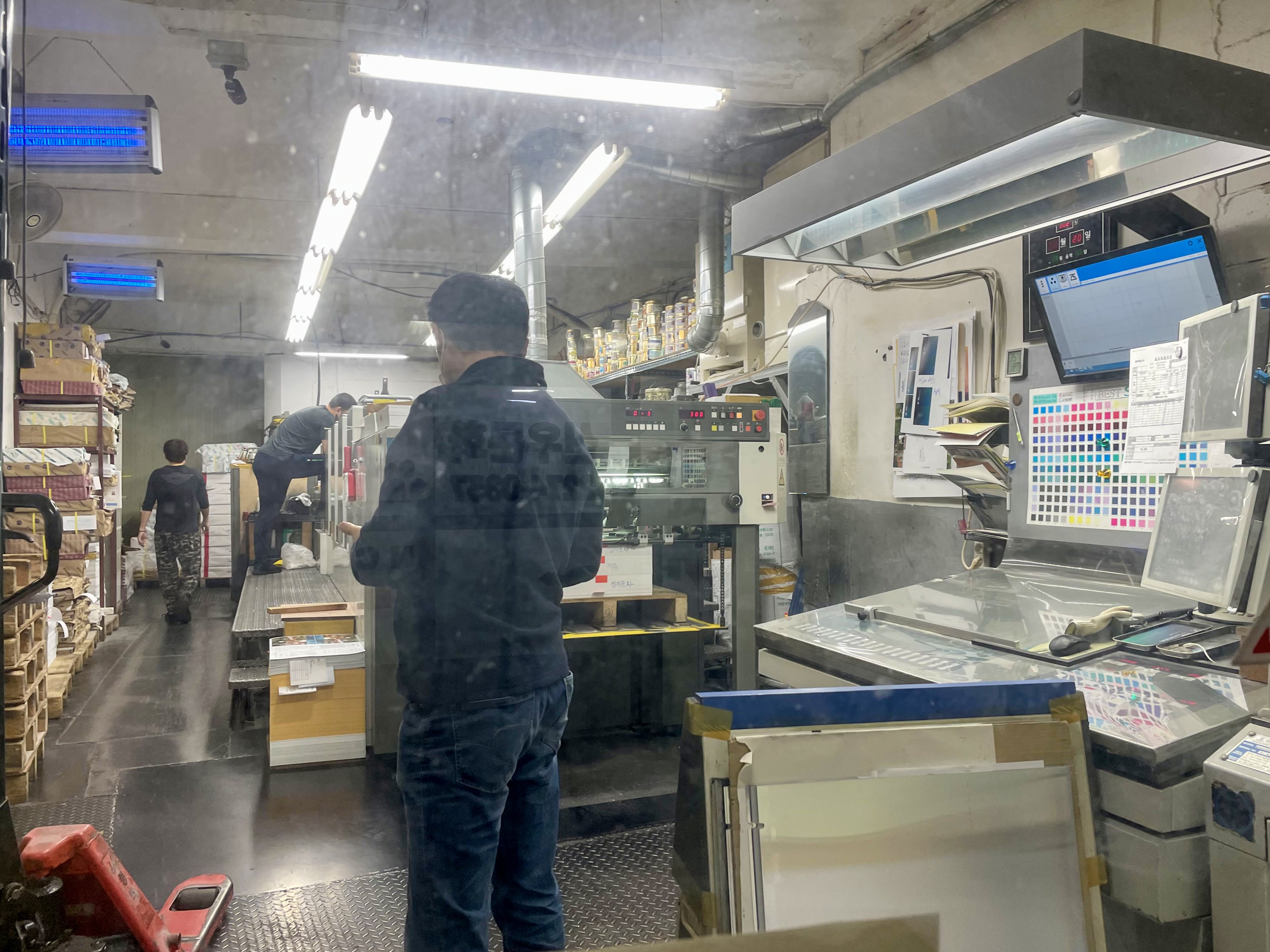
Shoonhwan advertising and printing company

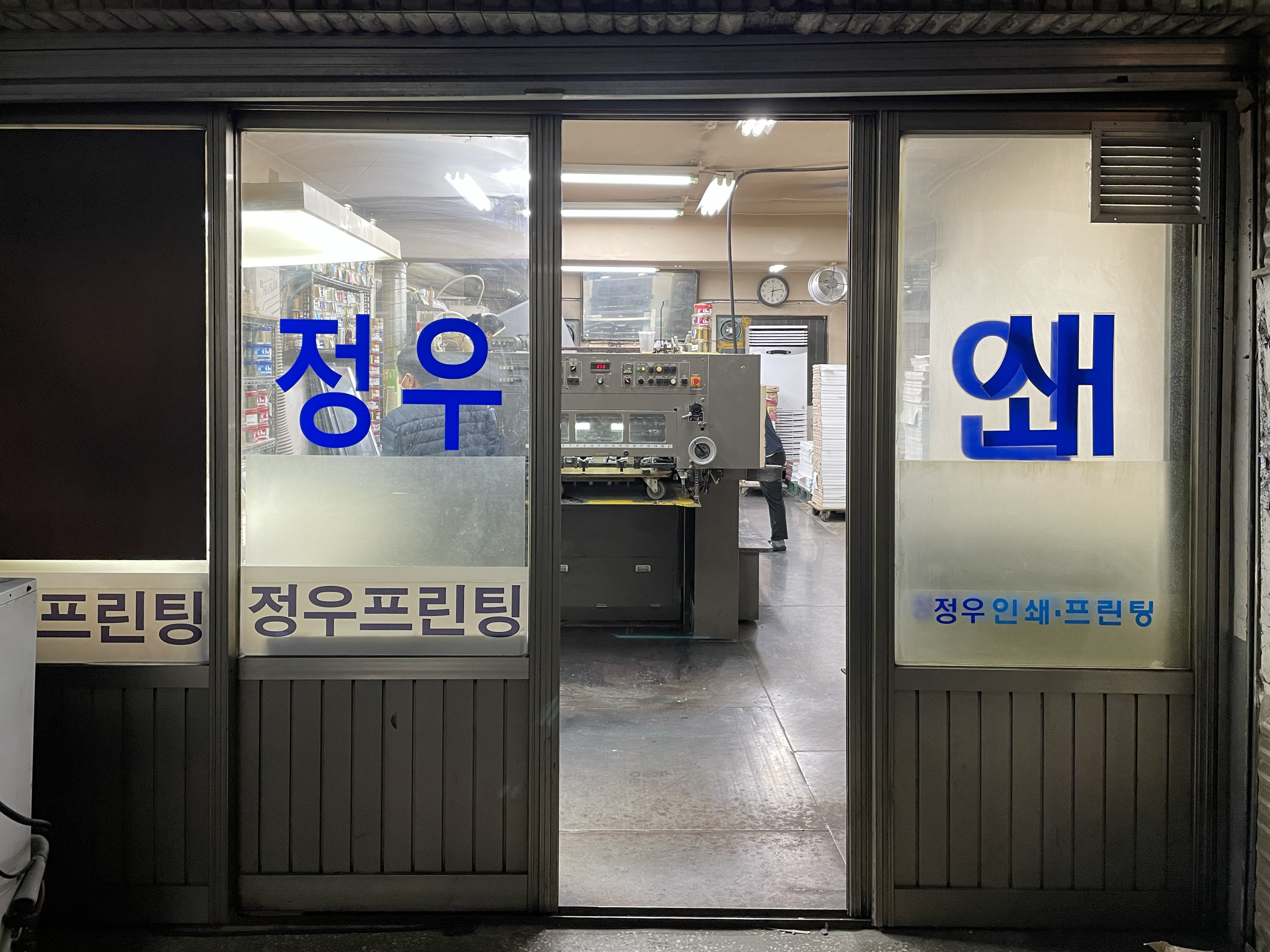
Jeongwoo Printing

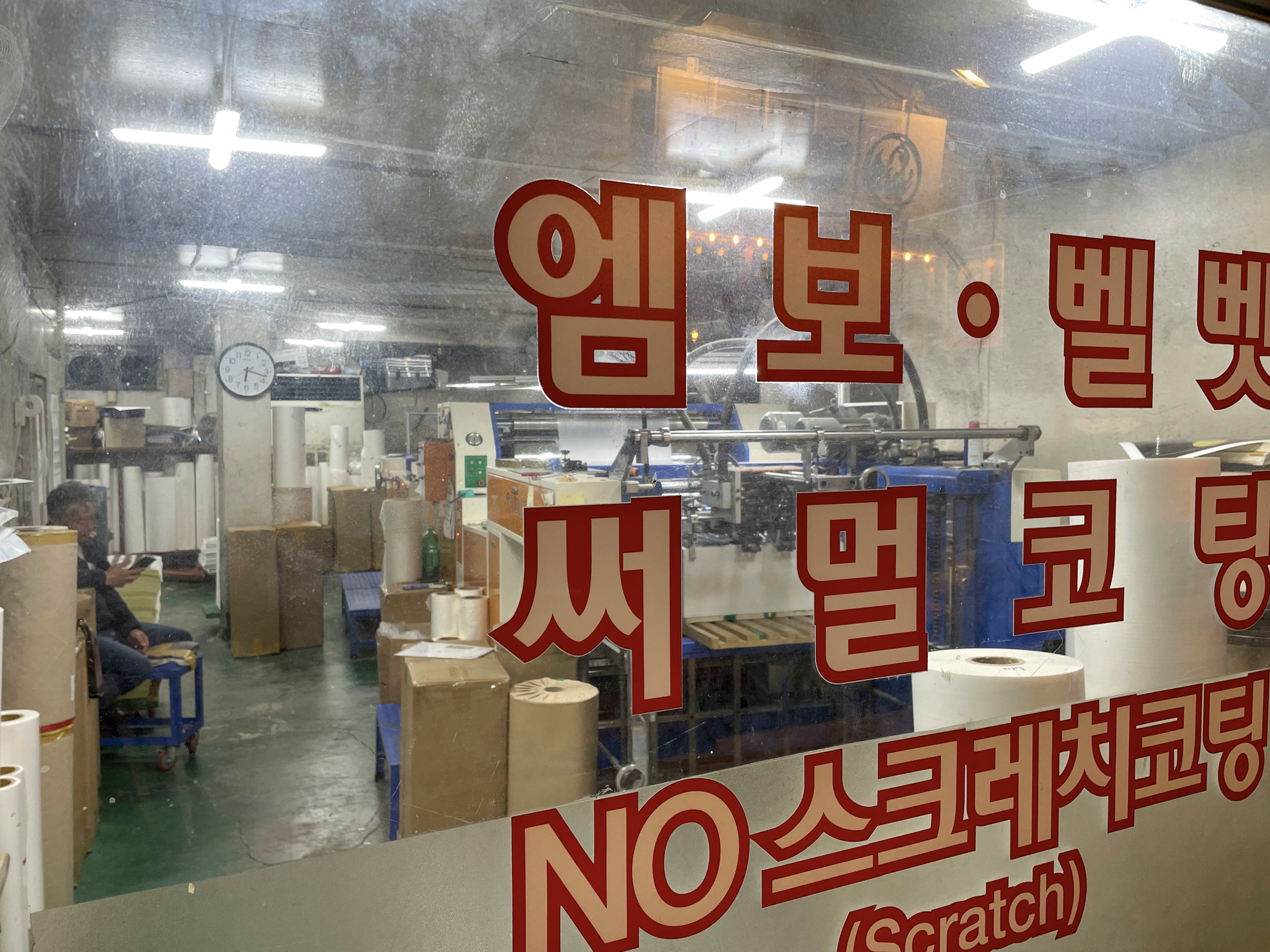
A coating company

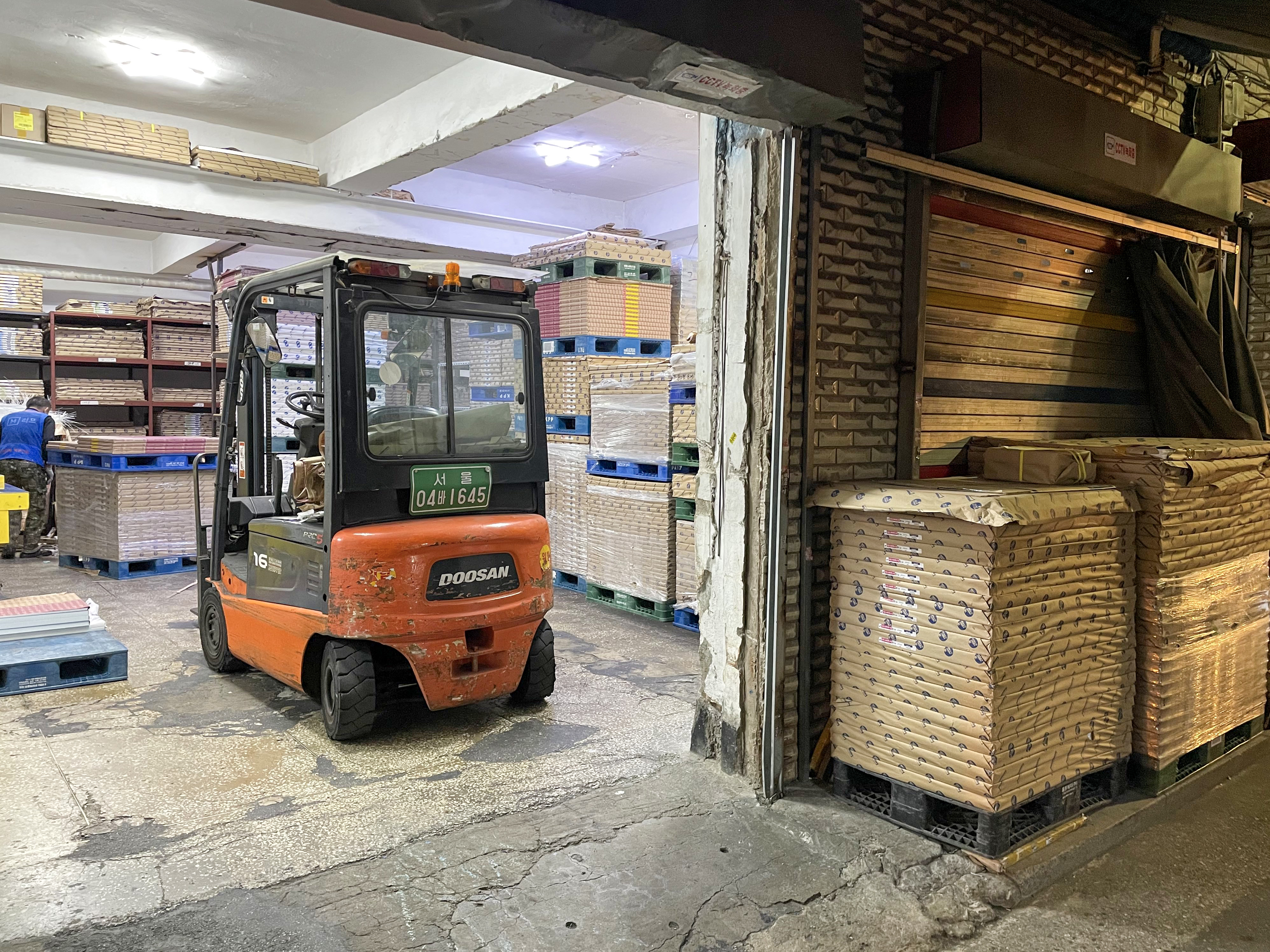
A paper wholesaler

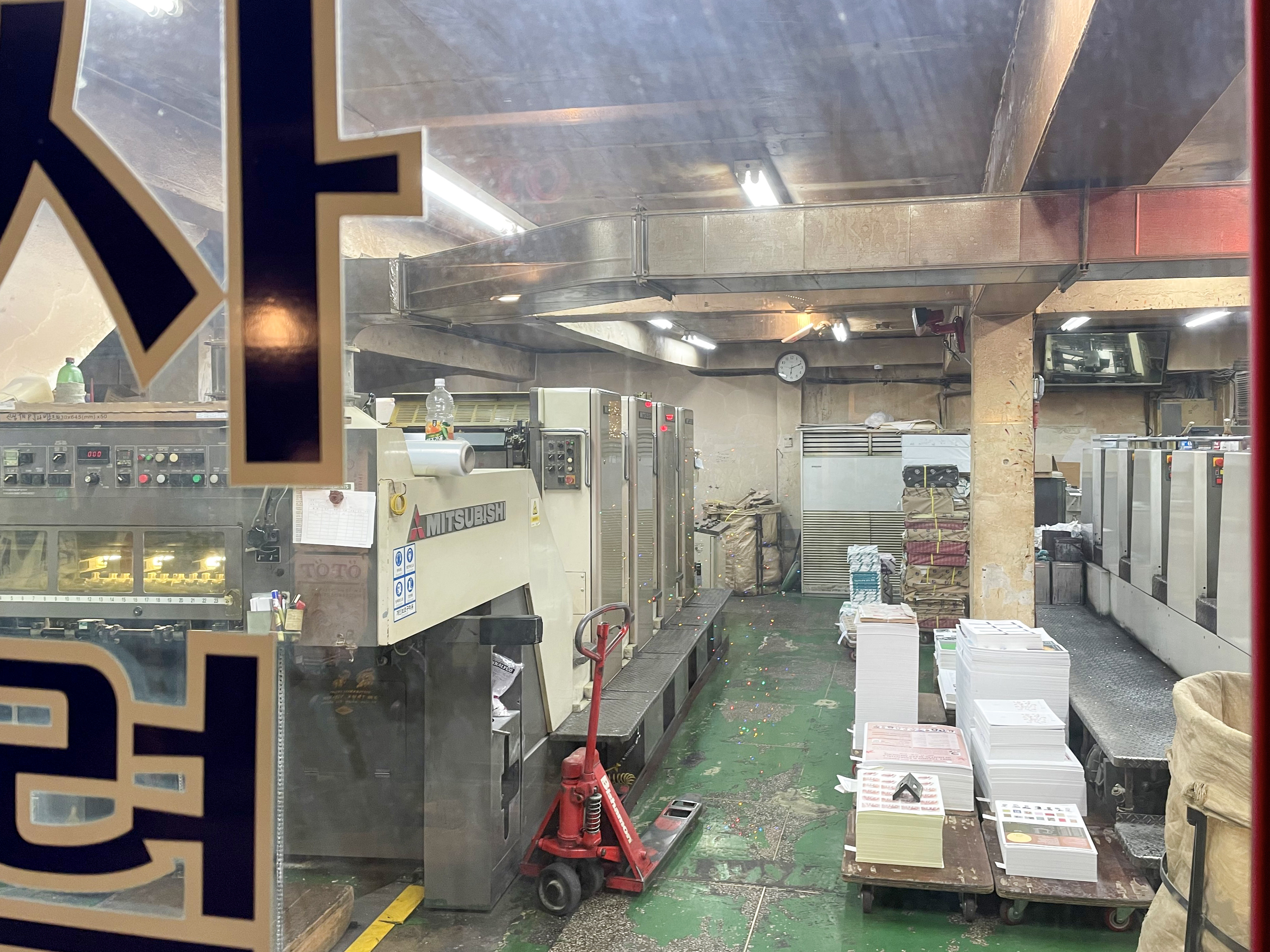
A printing company

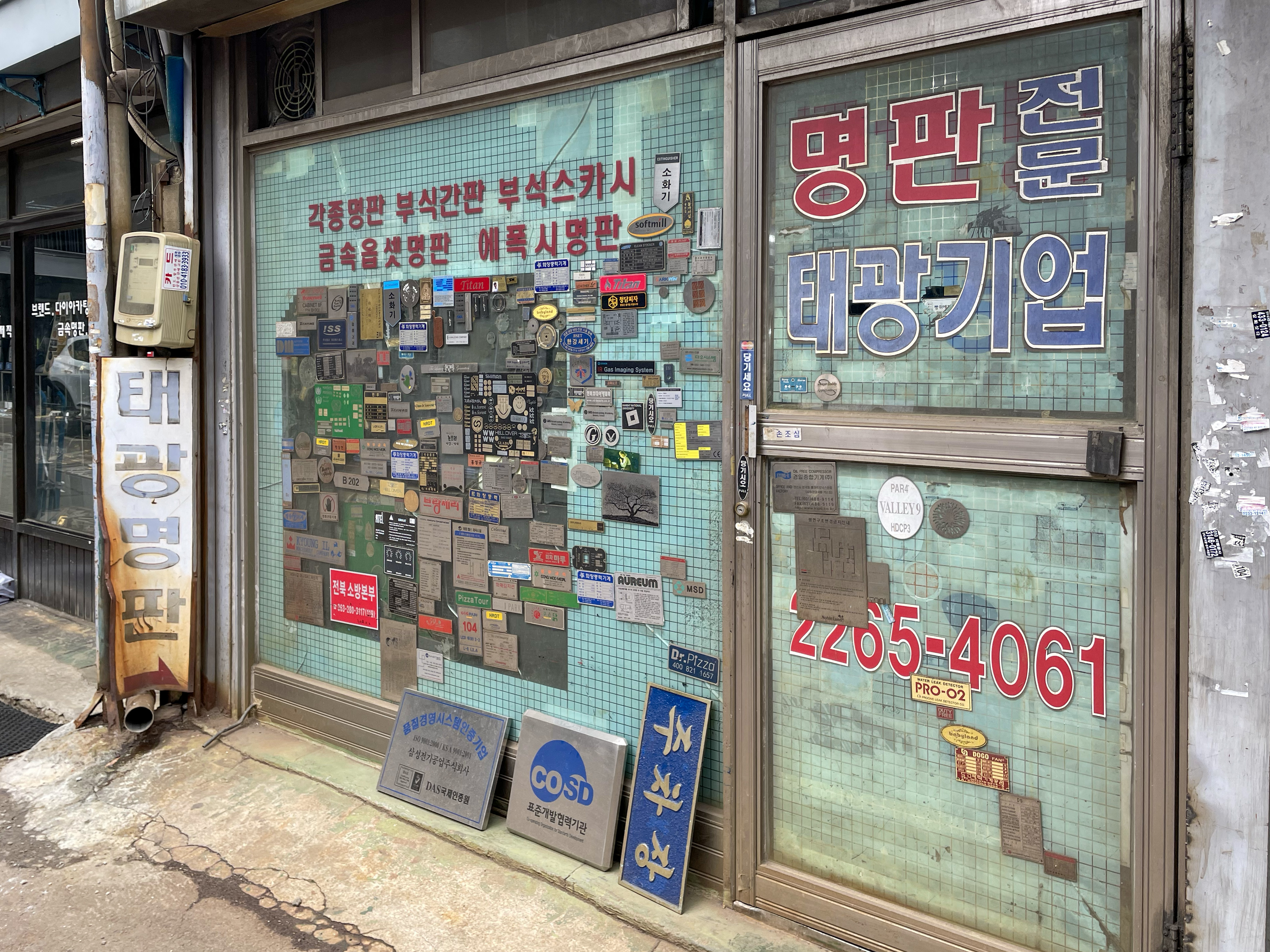
Taekwang nameplate combining metal and printworks

=== Metalworks ===
The area has also high concentration of metalworks industry. These shops are located mainly in Sallim-dong area. There are businesses for metal wholesale, cutting, casting, assembly and art.

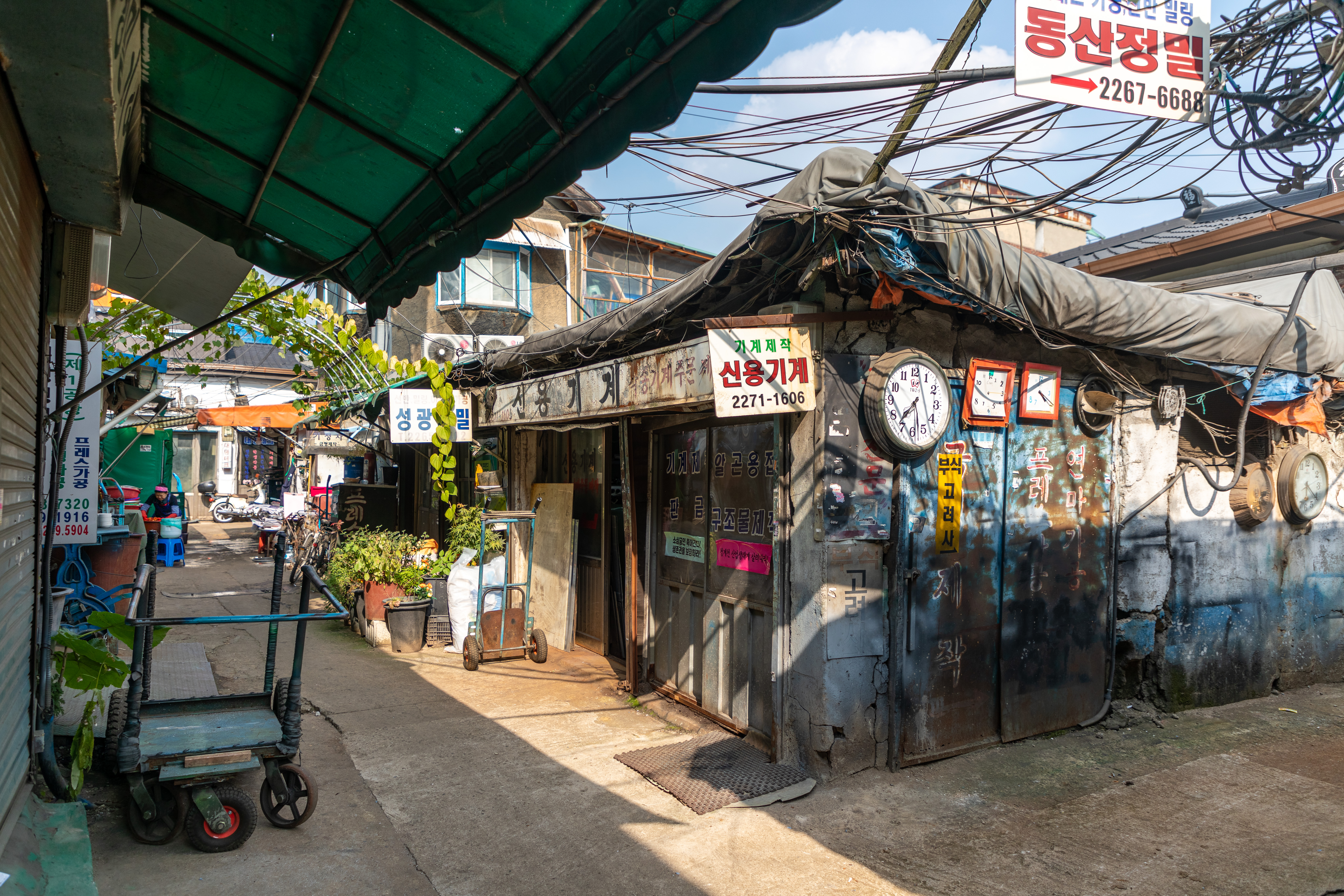
Industrial premises

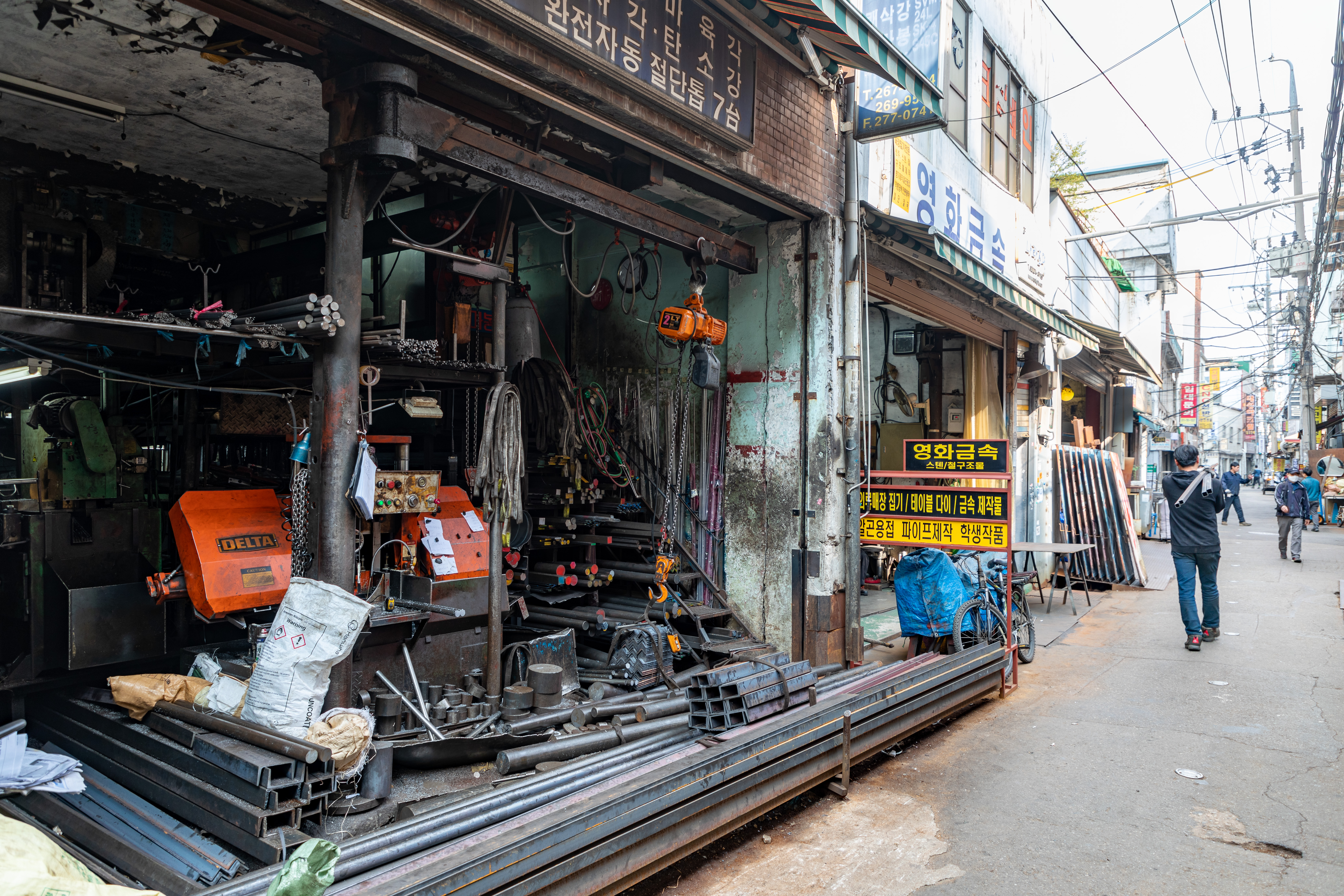
Metal cutting shop

=== Electronics ===
Daerim Plaza has a cluster for electronics, arcade cabinet parts and assembly. Area has also lots of household lighting and LED retailers. There are vendors specialised to amplifiers, professional audio equipment, CCTV and more.

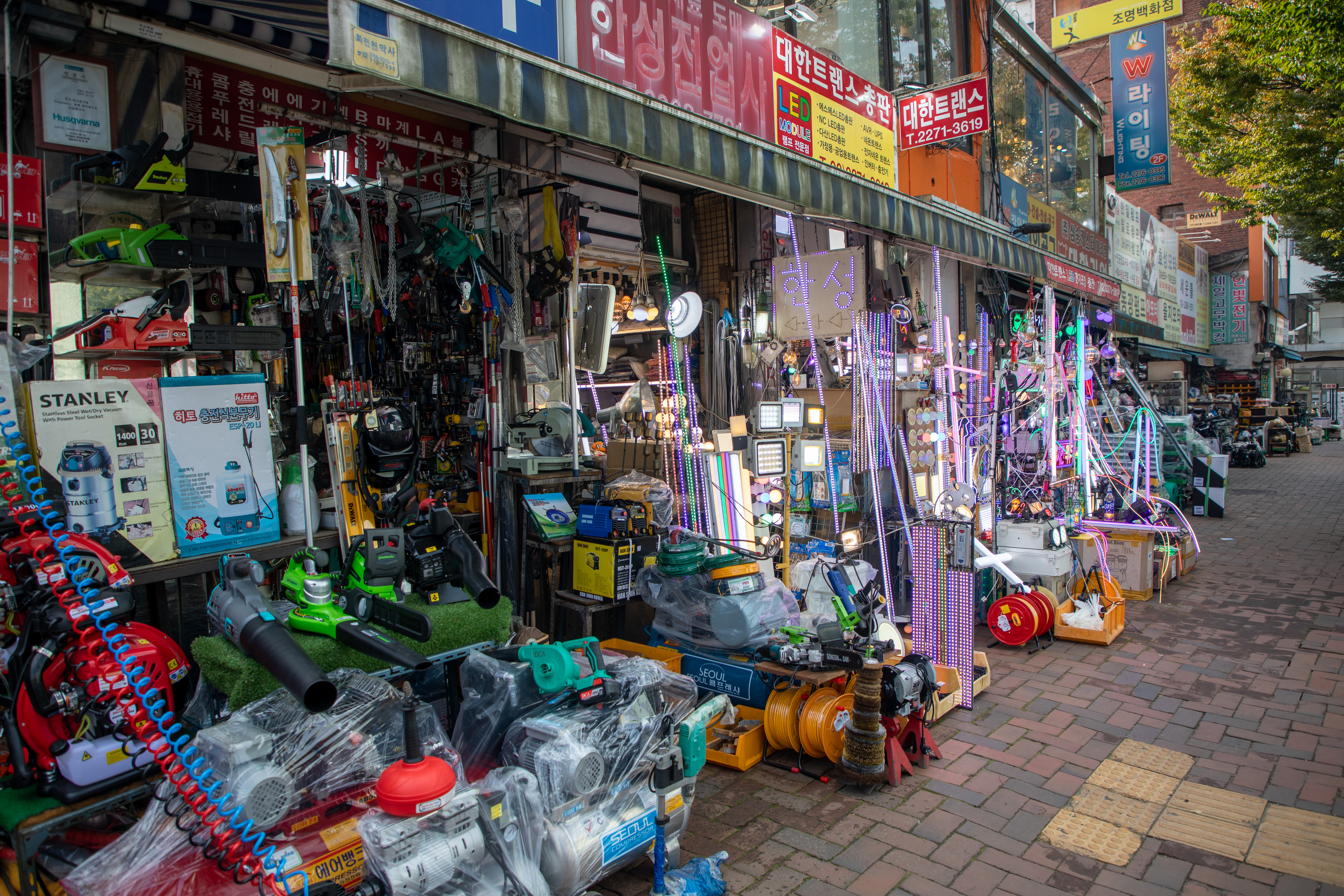
LED shop

== Transportation links ==
Euljiro has several links to Seoul Subway Line 2:

- Euljiro 1-ga Station
- Euljiro 3-ga Station
- Euljiro 4-ga Station
