= Supyo-dong =

Neighbourhood in Seoul, South Korea

- Cheonggyecheon-ro, Supyo-dong
- Country: South Korea

Korean name
- Hangul: 수표동
- Hanja: 水標洞
- RR: Supyo-dong
- MR: Sup'yo-dong

Supyo-dong (Korean: 수표동) is a legal dong (neighbourhood) of Jung District, Seoul, South Korea. It is administered by its administrative dong, Myeong-dong.

== See also ==
- Administrative divisions of South Korea
