= Suha-dong =

Neighbourhood in Seoul, South Korea

- Country: South Korea

Korean name
- Hangul: 수하동
- Hanja: 水下洞
- RR: Suha-dong
- MR: Suha-dong

Suha-dong (Korean: 수하동) is a legal dong (neighbourhood) of Jung District, Seoul, South Korea. It is administered by its administrative dong, Myeong-dong.

== See also ==
- Administrative divisions of South Korea
