= Janggyo-dong =

Neighborhood in Seoul, South Korea

- Interactive map of Janggyo-dong
- Country: South Korea

Area
  - Total: 0.03 km^{2} (0.012 sq mi)

Korean name
- Hangul: 장교동
- Hanja: 長橋洞
- RR: Janggyo-dong
- MR: Changgyo-dong

Janggyo-dong (Korean: 장교동) is a legal dong (neighborhood) of Jung District, Seoul, South Korea. It is governed by its administrative dong, Myeong-dong.

== See also ==
- Administrative divisions of South Korea
