= Dust corner =

Dust corners are triangle-shaped pieces, usually made of brass or nickel, that are used to prevent dust from accumulating in corners. Stair dust corners are used on staircases at the point where the tread, riser, and stringer meet. Dust corners make household chores such as sweeping and vacuuming more convenient. Stair dust corners originated in the 1880s, during the Victorian era. Dust corners typically have a small hole in the middle so a nail can be hammered into the stairs. Gail Caskey Winkler, author of Victorian Interior Decoration, believes dust corners originated in response to the public's new knowledge of the germ theory of disease.

Dust corners are most commonly found in older homes, but are still available for purchase in the 21st century. Vacuum cleaners have made dust corners largely obsolete, but dust corners are still used for decorative purposes and may make vacuum cleaning easier.

== See also ==
- Dust bunny
- Broom
- Stairs
- Stair tread
- Vacuum cleaner
- Victorian decorative arts
