= Seoul Chinese Primary School =

Chinese international primary school

- 韓國漢城華僑小學 한국한성화교소학교

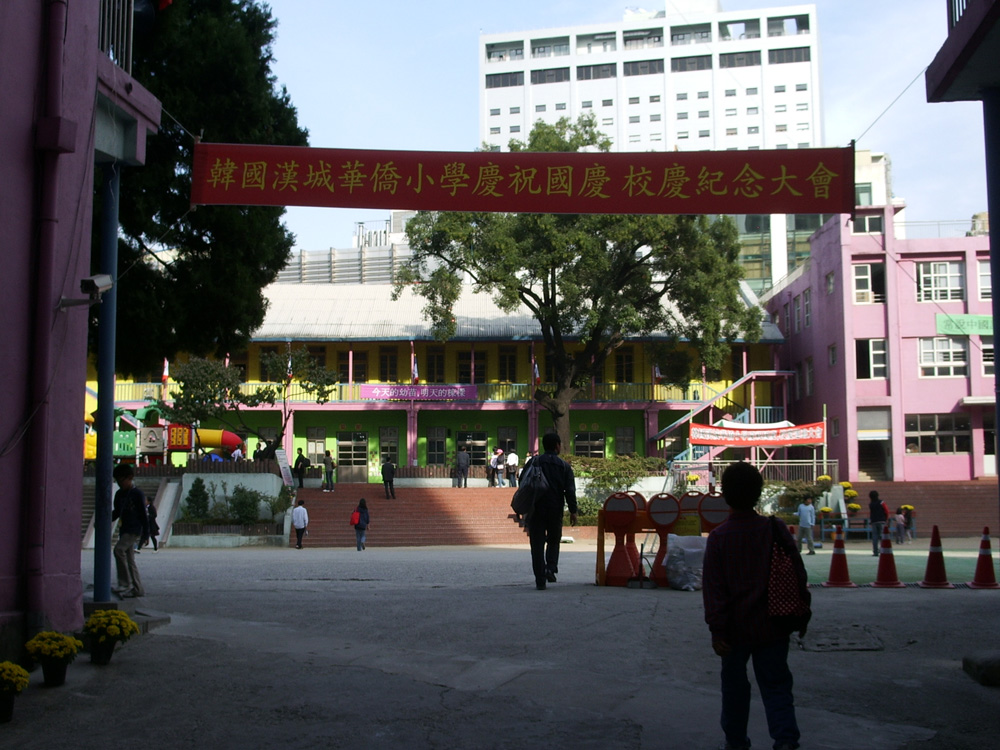

Location
- 35 Myeongdong 2-gil, Jung-gu; Seoul, 04536; South Korea; 37.56171°N 126.98307°E

Information
- Type: International school
- Established: October 5, 1909; 117 years ago
- Grades: Kindergarten and primary school
- Language: Chinese
- Website: www.hanxiao.or.kr/en/

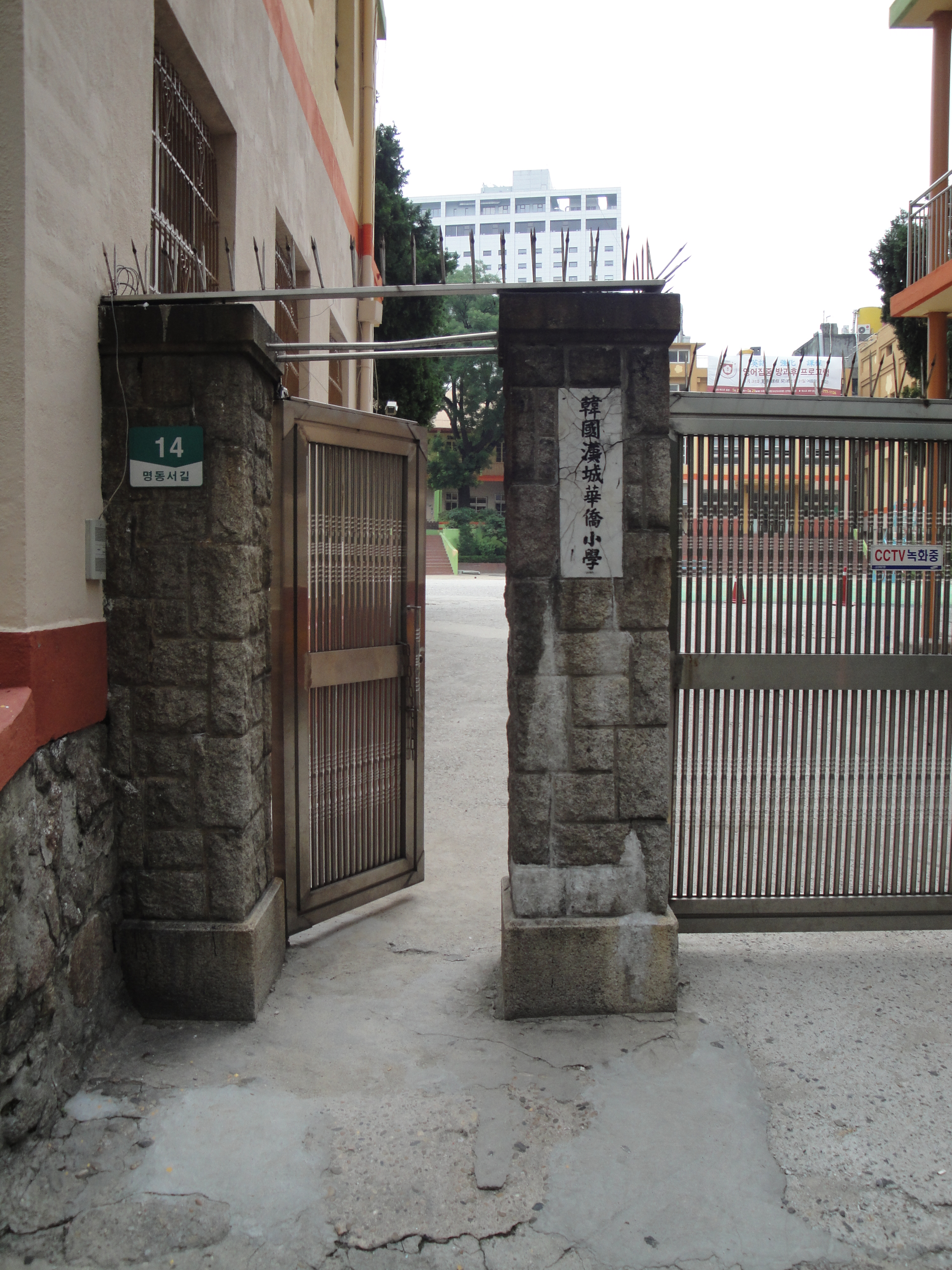
The school's gate in 2010

Seoul Chinese Primary School

Chinese name
- Traditional Chinese: 韓國漢城華僑小學
- Simplified Chinese: 韩国汉城华侨小学
Transcriptions
Standard Mandarin
- Hanyu Pinyin: Hánguó Hànchéng Huáqiáo Xiǎoxué
- Wade–Giles: Han-kuo Han-ch'eng Hua-ch'iao Hsiao-hsüeh

Korean name
- Hangul: 한국한성화교소학교

Seoul Chinese Primary School or Hanxiao Chinese Primary School (Chinese: 韓國漢城華僑小學; Korean: 한국한성화교소학교) is a Republic of China (Taiwan)-oriented Chinese international primary school located in Myeongdong, in Jung-gu, Seoul. It is in the center of the Myeongdong.

Most of its classes are taught in Chinese. The school offers training programs for spoken Mandarin, and it has programs modeled on those of the ROC. Its textbooks originate from the ROC.

Graduates of this school may attend Seoul Overseas Chinese High School.

== History ==
Chinese immigrants founded the school in 1909.

From the 1950s through the 1970s the student body numbered around 2,000 but preferences for education of the children in Mainland China, Taiwan, and the United States combined with a decline in the area birthrate caused the student population to decline down with the lowest number being 500 in 2008. The student body figures began to recover due to a trend promoting the study of the Chinese language; Korean families began sending their children to the school so they could learn Chinese. The president of the school's board of directors, Sui Hsing-chin, stated that the school began admitting non-Chinese students to promote the acceptance of ethnic Chinese in Korean society. In 2009 the school had about 600 students.

The school celebrated its 100-year anniversary in 2009. The Ambassador of the People's Republic of China to South Korea, Cheng Yonghua, attended the event. He congratulated the school and stated that the Embassy of the People's Republic of China in Seoul will offer support to the school.

== Student body ==
As of 2011 the school had 700 students, with 70-80% being overseas Chinese and the remainder including Korean students as well as Japanese, English, and French pupils. As of 2009 most of the students were born in South Korea.

== Notable alumni ==
- Joo Hyun-mi, trot singer
- Kang Rae-yeon, actress and model

== See also ==
- Chinese people in Korea
- South Korea–Taiwan relations
- China-Korea relations (pre-World War II)
- Korean schools in Taiwan:
  - Taipei Korean Elementary School (타이뻬이한국학교)
  - Kaohsiung Korea School (까오숑한국국제학교)
