= Stair tread =

Horizontal part of a stairway

A stair tread is the horizontal portion of a set of stairs on which a person walks. The tread can be composed of wood, metal, plastic, or other materials. In residential settings, treads can be covered in carpeting. Stair treads can come in non-slip varieties, particularly in commercial or industrial locations.

== Styles of tread ==
There are a number of different styles of tread:

=== Mid flight treads ===
Straight or flier
A standard oblong shaped tread. used in a straight flight.
Diminishing flier
Set into the straight section of flight before a turn, with one end narrower than the other Used to change the pitch of the handrail before a 180º turn.
Winder
wider at one end, used to turn the flight.
Kite winder
A quadrilateral shaped tread, used in the corner of a turn: hence the kite name.

=== Feature or starting treads ===
These treads are used to embellish the start of a flight of stairs, they may have either a straight front to them or a commode/curved front to enhance them further.

Curtail
An ornate tread that follows the spiral of a volute handrail, the back of the tread will cut into itself and then return along the flight.
Bullnose
A straight tread with the front corners rounded off.
"D" ends
So called as they look like a D shape attached to the end of the tread. A common style that may be carried up the flight for a number of treads.
Tower
The tower feature is a cylindrical addition to the front corner of a tread, intended for setting a newel post onto, the tower may be positioned dependent on the handrail termination.
Commode front
The addition of a curve to the front of a tread to create a more decorative feature.

== USAB & ADA compliance ==
According to the United States Access Board, stair treads in buildings shall have uniform tread depths that are 11 inches, or 280 mm, at minimum. Treads are not permitted to have a slope steeper than 1:48.

All stair tread installations must comply with Regulation 302 of the ADA Standards for Accessible Design. The regulation states that the surface of the [tread] must be firm, stable, and slip-resistant.

== Notable sets of stair treads ==
The Dylan's Candy Bar flagship location features a stair case consisting of 53 resin stair treads and three landings that are embedded with real candy and equipped with inserted abrasion strips.

China's first children's design museum, Kids Museum of Glass, has alternating black and white stair treads on its central staircase, earning the nickname "The Piano Staircase".

As part of the Underground Shopping Center Public Art Project, the Seoul Metropolitan Facilities Management Corporation built a piano staircase in the underground passage at Euljiro 1-ga Station. Each step lit up and played a note as it was walked on.

IDEO Labs' interns created a musical staircase during summer of 2011. Each tread played a different sound when stepped on.

Johns Hopkins University students turned a Hackerman Hall staircase into a piano, with a new note per step. The Hopkins Robotics Club modified the staircase so the treads played the C scale.
