= Kang Rae-yeon =

South Korean actress (born 1981)

- Born: Kang Rae-yeon; March 19, 1981 (age 45); Seoul, South Korea
- Other name: Kang Rae-yun
- Education: Sejong University
- Occupations: Actress; model
- Years active: 1997–present
- Agent: Mystic Story

Korean name
- Hangul: 강래연
- Hanja: 姜萊燕
- RR: Gang Raeyeon
- MR: Kang Raeyŏn

Chinese name
- Simplified Chinese: 姜莱燕
Transcriptions
Standard Mandarin
- Hanyu Pinyin: Jiāng Láiyàn

Kang Rae-yeon (Korean: 강래연; born March 19, 1981) is a South Korean actress and model. She is known for her roles in dramas such as The Time We Were Not in Love and Gogh, The Starry Night.

== Early life ==
Kang was born an only child and a third-generation South Korean; her family was originally from Shandong, China. She attended Seoul Chinese Primary School and Seoul Overseas Chinese High School, and graduated from Sejong University with a degree in hotel management.

== Career ==
Kang started a modeling career posing for magazines. She made her acting debut in the 1998 film Zzang. She went on to work on television series The Bean Chaff of My Life, Forever Love, and My Love Patzzi, among others. Beginning in 2004, Kang took a three-year break from acting to go backpacking across several countries including the United States, Canada, India, and Egypt. She returned to acting in KBS1's Heaven & Earth.

Kang appeared in SBS dramas in On Air, A Thousand Days' Promise, and Queen of Reversals on MBC. In the same year, she appeared in film Sunny and Juvenile Offender. She was recognized for her acting skills. She also amazed the audience, when she spoke in English, Chinese and Korean. The netizens were happy, when she returned to acting, saying it's been a while.

Kang signed an exclusive contract with Will Entertainment in mid-2014. Two years later, she signed with Mystic Actors, Mystic Story's branch for actors. She was cast as hall manager Gung Rae-yeon in Seoul Broadcasting System's (SBS) 2018 romantic comedy series Wok of Love.

== Filmography ==
=== Television series ===
Year	Title	Role	Ref.
1998	Soonpoong Clinic	Kim Jung-hee	
1999	School	Gang Rae-yeon	
2000	Tough Guy's Love	Joo Ggeut-soon	
2000	Snowflakes	Yoon Si-bong	
2001	Sun Hee and Jin Hee	Yang Moon-sook	
2002	Romance	So-young's friend	
2002	Sweet or Bitter	Jeon kang-yun	
2002	My Love Patzzi	Hwangbo Yu-ri	
2002	My Platoon Leader	Yoon Mi-kyung	
2003	Sun Duk	Kim Hyun-shim	
2003	Forever Love	Hee-sook	
2003	The Bean Chaff of My Life	In Kyeong-oh	
2005	A Love to Kill	Choi Mi-seon	
2007	Heaven & Earth	Seo Mi-ae	
2008	On Air	Travel guide	
2010	Queen of Reversals	So Yoo-kyung	
2011	Lie to Me	Rae-yeon	
2011	A Thousand Days' Promise	Myung-hee	
2015	The Time We Were Not in Love	Kang Na-young	
2015	My Daughter, Geum Sa-wol	Kang Jjil-rae	
2016	Gogh, The Starry Night	Lee Hee-yeon	
2017	Unusual Men and Women	Kang So-young	
2018	Wok of Love	Gung Rae-yeon	
2019	Gogo Song	Ms.Park	
2020	Awaken	Min Yu-ra	
2022	Today's Webtoon	Ki Yu-mi	

=== Film ===
Year	Title	Role	Language	Ref.
1998	Zzang	Chil Gong-joo	Korean	
2003	Madeleine	Lee Yoo-jung	Korean	
2005	Sa-kwa	Hye-jeong	Korean	
2006	Fly High	Kyung-rim	Korean	
2007	Miss Gold Digger	Yang Dae-ri	Korean	
2011	Sunny	Jong-ki's girlfriend	Korean	
2012	Juvenile Offender	Ji-yeong	Korean	
2018	Mermaid Unlimited	Ga-yeon	Korean	
2020	Jang-Gae	Restaurant waitress	Korean	
2022	Give Them: Secret of the Lost	Daughter	Korean	
