= Sallim-dong =

Neighbourhood in Seoul, South Korea

Coordinates: 34°31′N 126°38′E

- Interactive map of Sallim-dong
- Country: South Korea

Korean name
- Hangul: 산림동
- Hanja: 山林洞
- RR: Sallim-dong
- MR: Sallim-dong

Sallim-dong (Korean: 산림동) is a legal dong (neighbourhood) of Jung District, Seoul, Seoul, South Korea. It is administered by its administrative dong, Euljiro 3, 4, 5ga-dong. The district has a strong metal industry workshop presence.

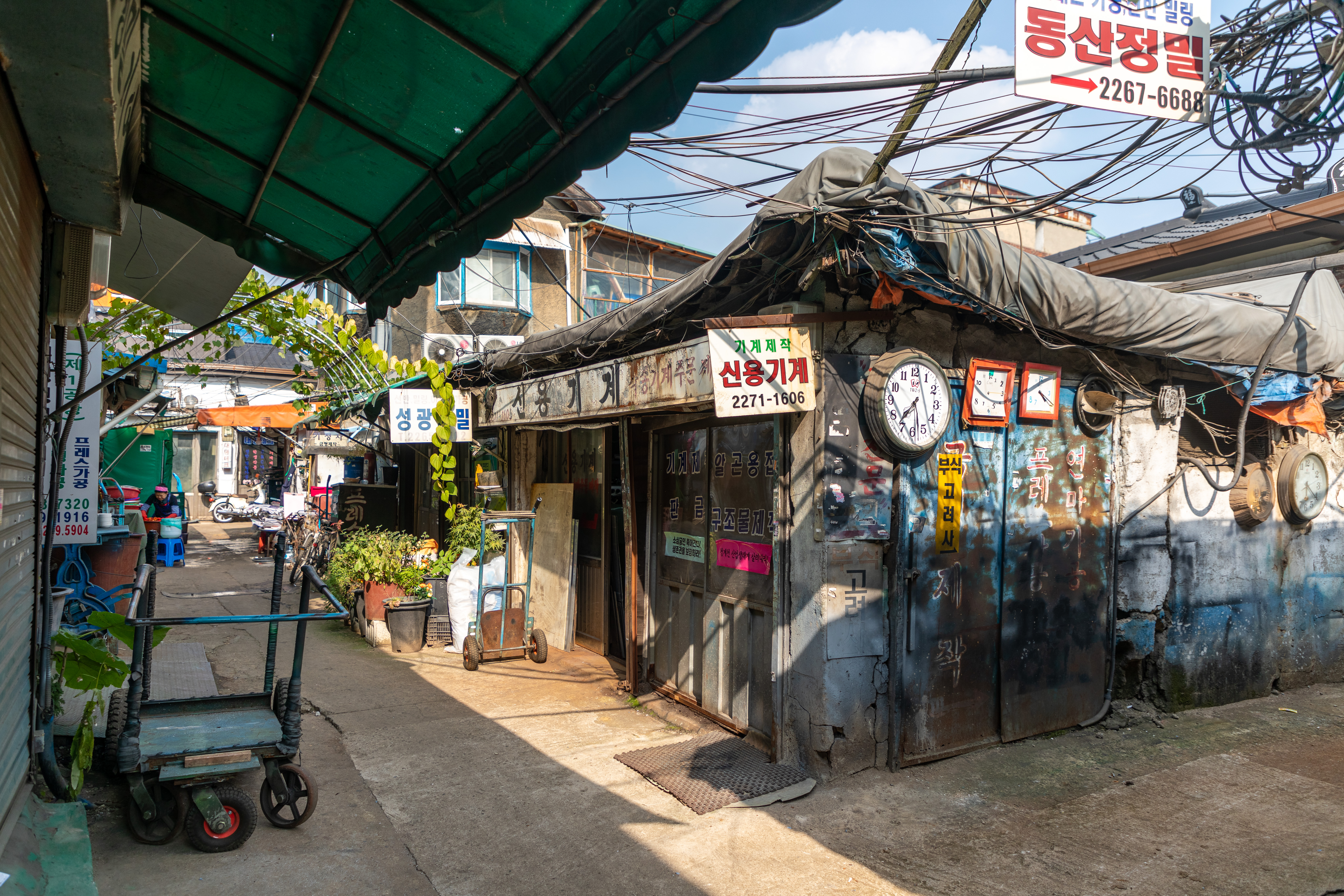
Industrial premises

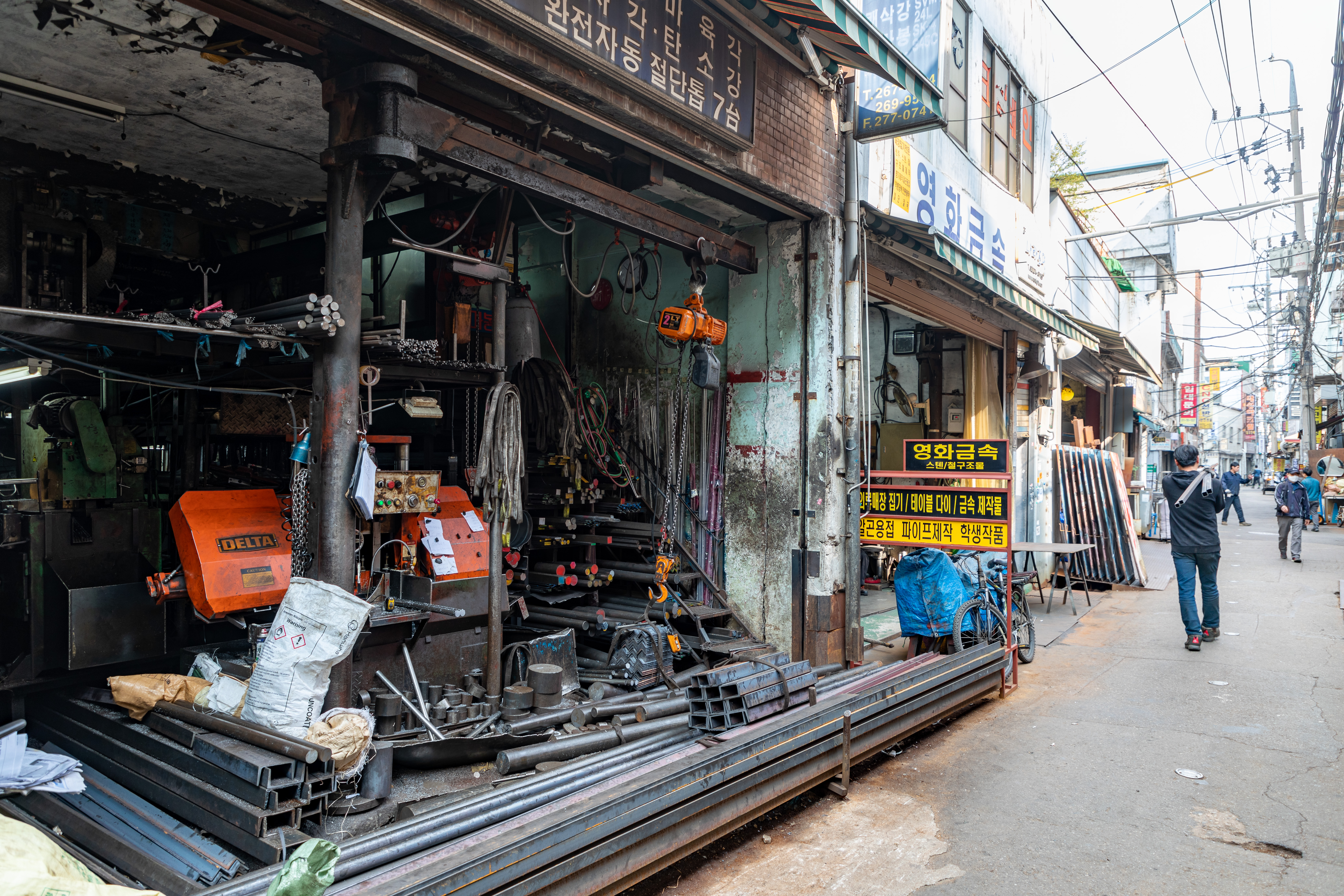
Metal cutting shop

== See also ==
- Administrative divisions of South Korea
