= Seoul Overseas Chinese High School =

International school in Seoul, South Korea

- Chinese: 韓國漢城華僑中學; Korean: 한국한성화교중고등학교

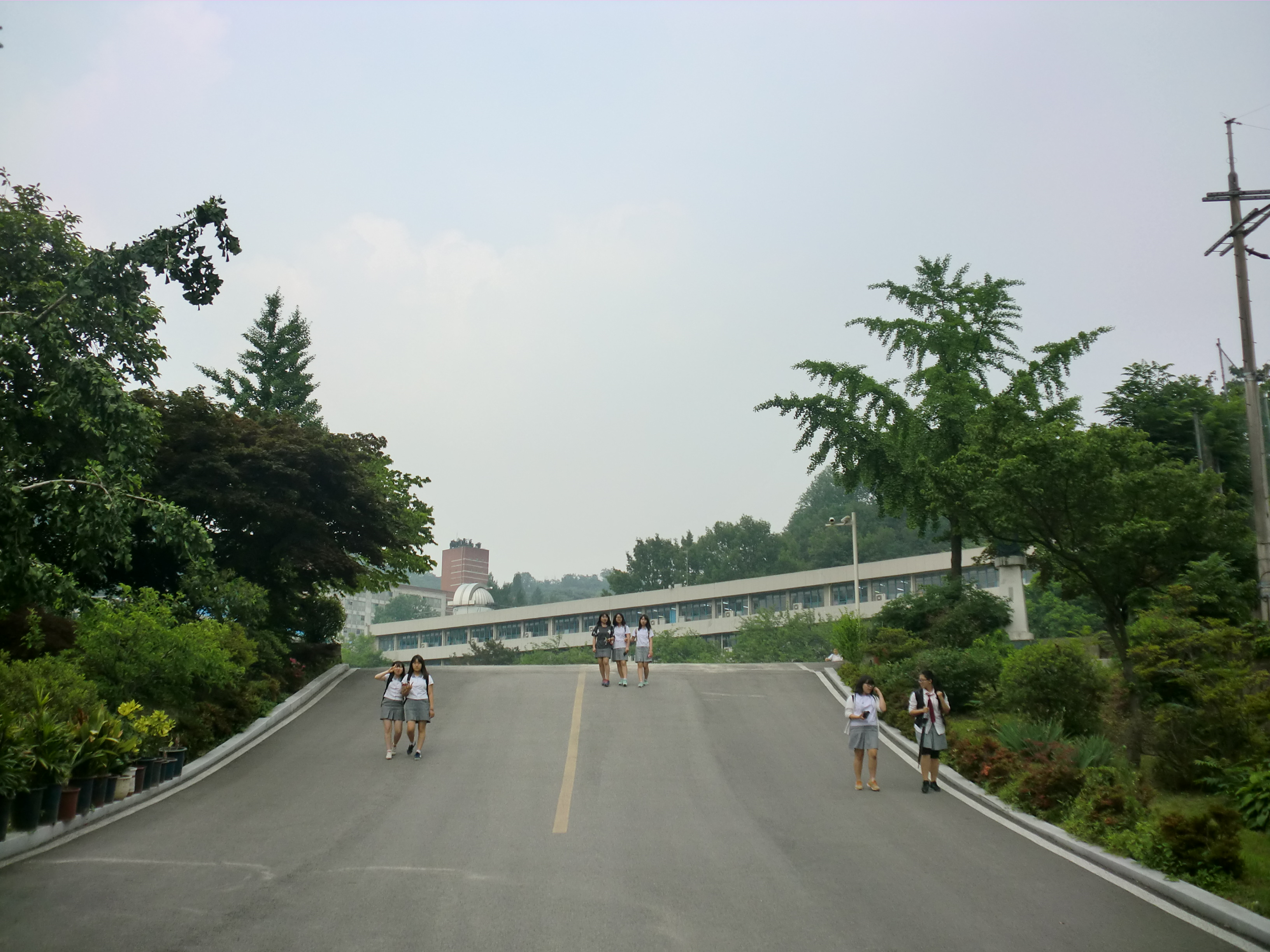
- Entrance to the school in 2014

Location
- 176 Yeonhui-ro, Seodaemun-gu; Seoul, 03723; South Korea; 37.57203°N 126.93719°E

Information
- Type: Private international school
- Established: May 5, 1948; 78 years ago
- Principal: 于植盛
- Grades: Junior and senior high school
- Gender: Coeducational
- Language: Chinese
- Website: www.scs.or.kr

Seoul Overseas Chinese High School or Hanseong Chinese Middle and High School (Chinese: 韓國漢城華僑中學; Korean: 한국한성화교중고등학교) is a Republic of China (Taiwan)-oriented Chinese international junior and senior high school in Seodaemun District, Seoul, South Korea. It follows the curriculum of the ROC, and accordingly uses textbooks from Taiwan.

It is a hwagyo, or an ethnic Chinese school in South Korea. The South Korean government began recognizing hwagyo as educational institutions in 1998.

The area primary school serving Chinese students is Seoul Chinese Primary School in Jung-gu.

== History ==
The school opened as the Kwanghwa Middle School (光華中學) in 1942. It temporarily closed in 1945 stemming from the fallout from World War II. With help from Republic of China officials, it reopened in 1948, along with the Seoul Chinese Primary School, on the premise of the Republic of China Embassy in Myongdong, Seoul (首爾明洞區).

In 1968, with the student populations of both schools exploding, the local Chinese community decided to separate the two schools, building a new Secondary School in Seodaumun-gu, Seoul (首爾西大門區), where it remains today. The School then saw a long period of expanding student body, cresting in 2003 with 1,100 students. Since then, the size of its student population has steadily declined, as the size of the local Chinese community gradually shrunk. As of 2020, it has about 500 students.

Sun Shu-i (孫樹義) became the principal in 1984. Yu, Chi-Sheng (于植盛) took over as the Principal in 2015 when Sun retired.

== Operation ==
The school mainly serves students from 7th to 12th grade, totaling about 500 students. Students mainly come from several "feeder" schools in the greater Seoul area. These include the Seoul Chinese Primary School (韓國漢城華僑小學), Yeongdeungpo Chinese Primary School (永登浦華僑小學), Suwon Chinese Primary (水原華僑中正小學) and Uijeongbu Chinese Primary School (議政府華僑小學). Some students also come from other areas of Korea like Incheon or even Busan. Its sister school in Korea include the Sun Yat-Sen Memorial Chinese High School of Incheon (仁川華僑中山中學) and Overseas Chinese Elementary School Daegu (韓國大邱華僑中學).

School curriculum mainly follows those prescribed by the ROC Ministry of Education (中華民國教育部), with Korean added to adapt to local environment. Starting in Fall, 2020, the School will begin to use material mandated in the new curriculum guideline instituted by the ROC Ministry of Education in 2019. Textbooks used are those published by 南一書局, provided by the Overseas Chinese Community Council (中華民國僑務委員會).

The School is famous for its Art classes, with students doing traditional arts like painting and Chinese calligraphy as well as modern audio and video media.

The School also runs many Chinese cultural activities like Lion Dance, Chinese Folk Dance, and Dragon Dance. Its Dance troupes regularly perform in official and community events.

== Notable alumni ==
- Joo Hyun-mi, trot singer
- Kang Rae-yeon, actress and model
- Tzuyu, member of Twice
- Shu-mei Shih, scholar of Chinese literature and history
- Sun Sheng Xi, singer-songwriter
