= Euljiro 3(sam)-ga station =

Train station in South Korea

을지로3가 (신한카드); Euljiro 3(sam)-ga (Shinhan Card)
을지로3가 (신한카드); Euljiro 3(sam)-ga (Shinhan Card)
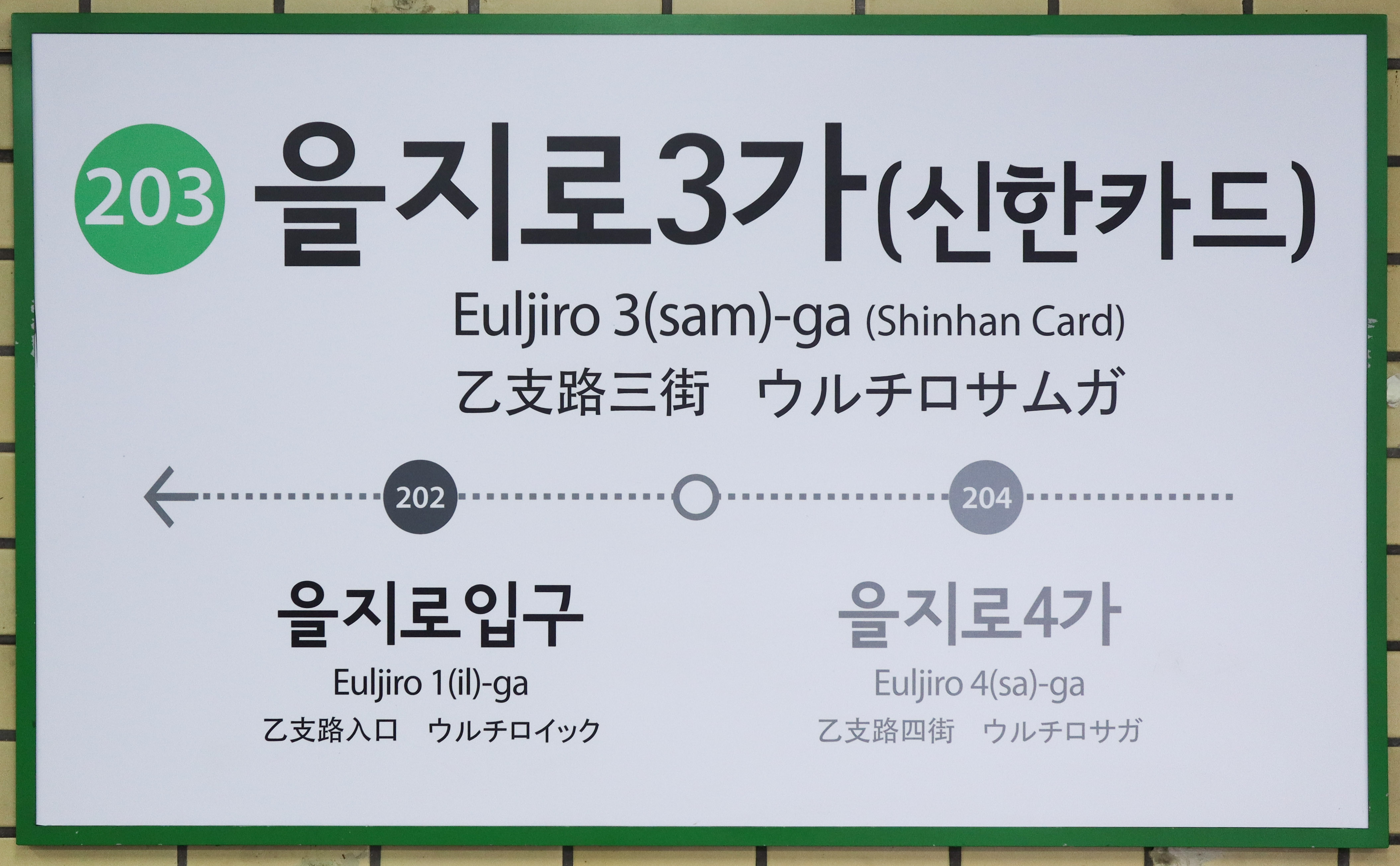
- Station Sign (Line 2)

Korean name
- Hangul: 을지로3가역
- Hanja: 乙支路3街驛
- Revised Romanization: Euljirosamga-yeok
- McCune–Reischauer: Ŭljirosamga-yŏk

General information
- Location: 70-1 Euljiro 3-ga, Jung-gu, Seoul
- Coordinates: 37°33′58.66″N 126°59′34.01″E
- Operator: Seoul Metro
- Lines: Line 2 Line 3
- Platforms: 3
- Tracks: 4

Construction
- Structure type: Underground

Key dates
- September 16, 1983: Line 2 opened
- October 18, 1985: Line 3 opened

Passengers
- (Daily) Based on Jan-Dec of 2012. Line 2: 34,682; Line 3: 19,539
Services
Preceding station	Seoul Metropolitan Subway	Following station
Euljiro 1(il)-ga Next counter-clockwise	Line 2	Euljiro 4(sa)-ga Next clockwise
Jongno 3(sam)-ga towards Daehwa	Line 3	Chungmuro towards Ogeum
Location

Euljiro 3(sam)-ga (Korean: 을지로3가역) is a station on Line 2 and Line 3 of the Seoul Metropolitan Subway.

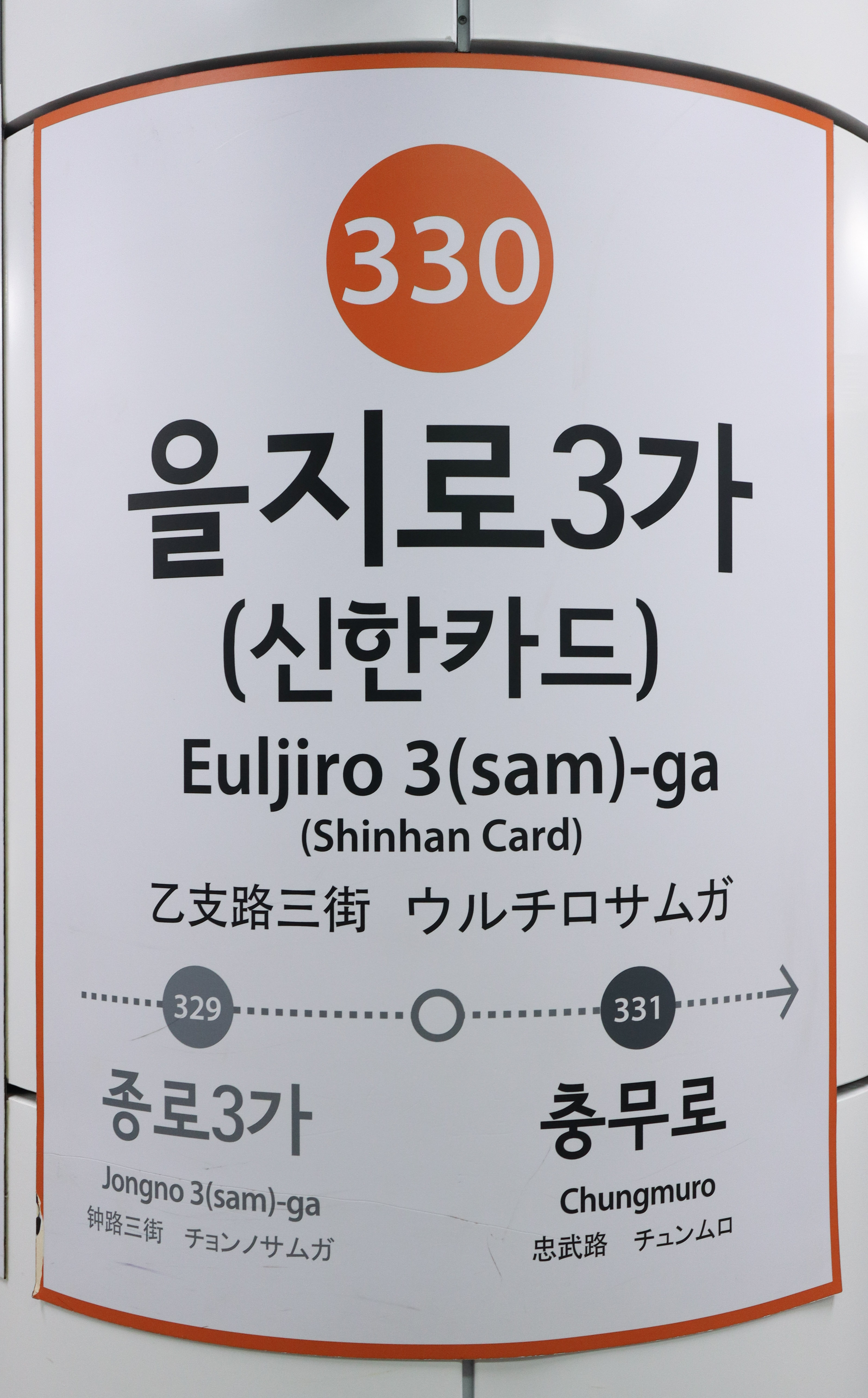
Station sign (Line 3)
