= Euljiro 1(il)-ga station =

Train station in South Korea

Coordinates: 37°33′58″N 126°58′57″E

을지로입구 (하나은행); Euljiro 1(il)-ga (Hana Bank)
- Station nameplate

Korean name
- Hangul: 을지로입구역
- Hanja: 乙支路入口驛
- Revised Romanization: Euljiro-ipgu-yeok
- McCune–Reischauer: Ŭljiro-ipku-yŏk

General information
- Location: 42 Euljiro Jiha, 89-1 Euljiro 1-ga, Jung-gu, Seoul
- Operator: Seoul Metro
- Line: Line 2
- Platforms: 2
- Tracks: 2

Construction
- Structure type: Underground

History
- Opened: September 16, 1983

Passengers
- (Daily) Based on Jan-Dec of 2012. Line 2: 104,561

Services
Preceding station	Seoul Metropolitan Subway	Following station
City Hall Next counterclockwise	Line 2	Euljiro 3(sam)-ga Next clockwise
Location

Euljiro 1(il)-ga (Korean: 을지로입구역) is a station on the Line 2 of the Seoul Metropolitan Subway. The station is found on the north end of the Myeongdong shopping district and is the station closest to the main branch of the Lotte Department Store.

The station's name in Korean (Euljiro-ipgu) does not match its English name. This is because Seoul Metro often omits the -ipgu suffix in its translations, and simply having the station be named Euljiro would have confused it with Euljiro 3(sam)-ga and Euljiro 4(sa)-ga stations.

== Station layout ==
G	Street level	Exit

L1; Concourse	Lobby	Customer Service, Shops, Vending machines, ATMs

L2; Platform level	Side platform, doors will open on the right
L2; Platform level	Outer circle	← Line 2 Next counterclockwise (City Hall)
L2; Platform level	Inner circle	Line 2 Next clockwise (Euljiro 3(sam)-ga) →
L2; Platform level	Side platform, doors will open on the right
