= Myeong-dong =

Neighborhood in Seoul, South Korea

Coordinates: 37.5637°N 126.9840°E

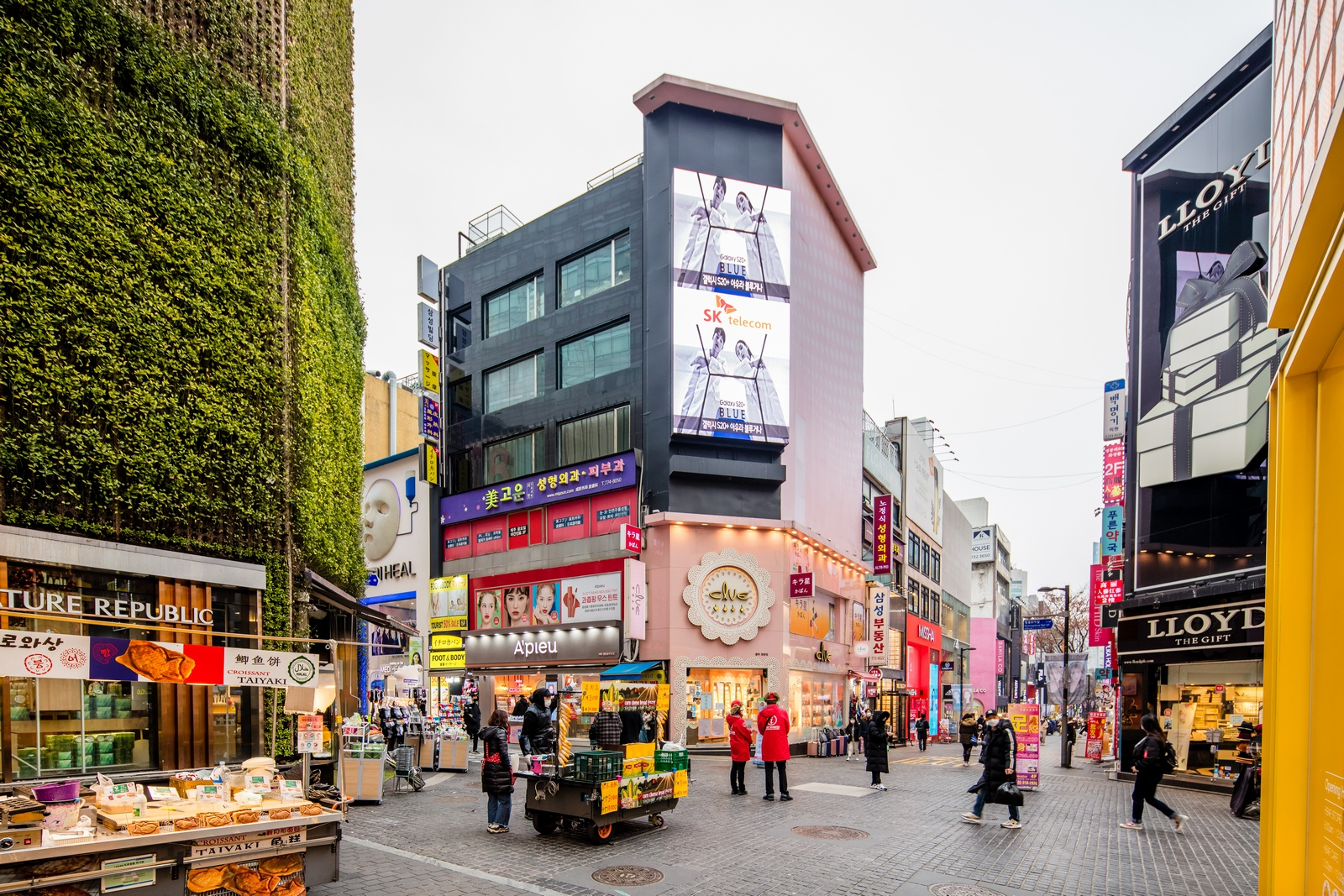
- Myeongdong (2020)

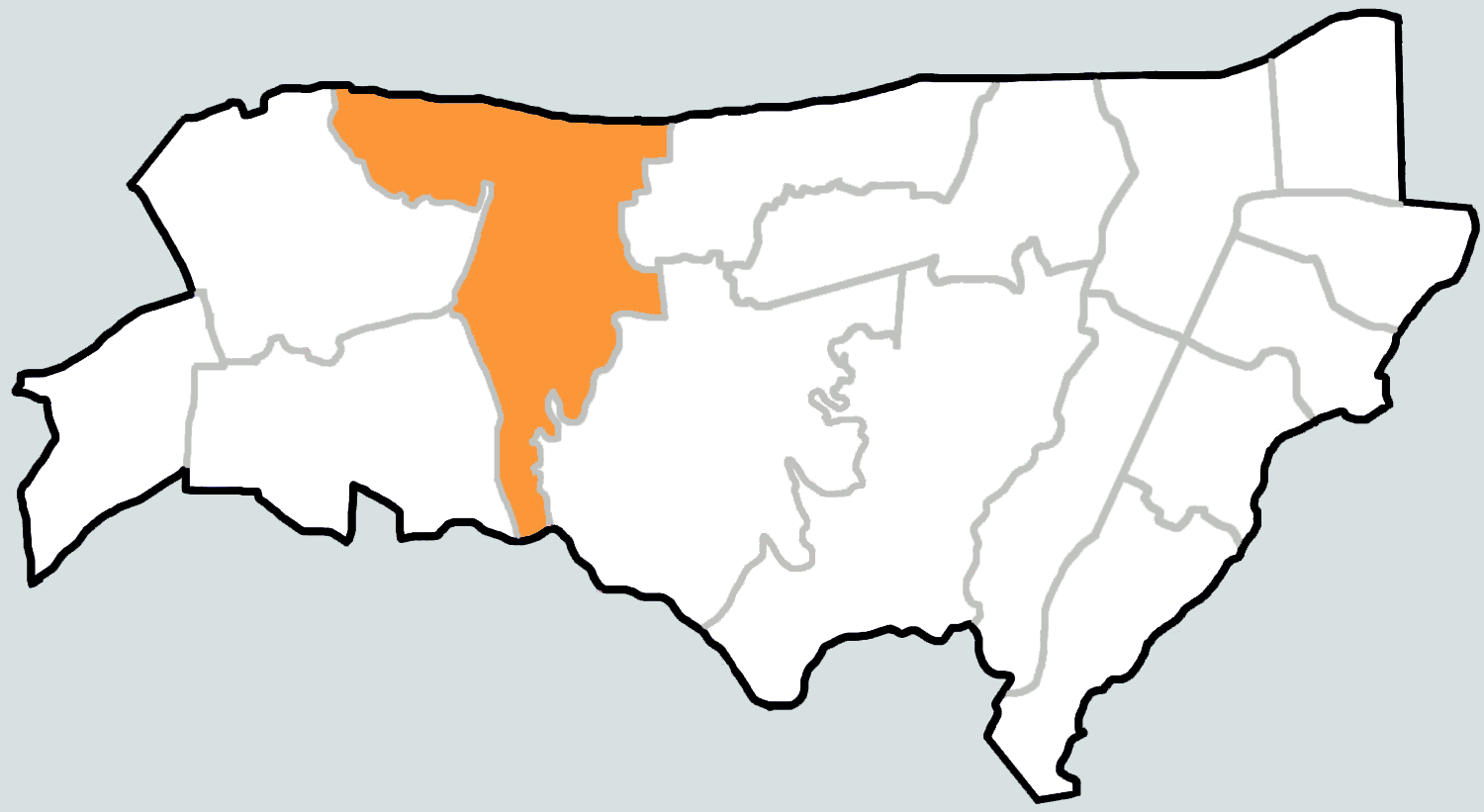
- City: Seoul

Area
  - Total: 0.99 km^{2} (0.38 sq mi)

Population (2013)
  - Total: 3,320
  - Density: 3,400/km^{2} (8,700/sq mi)

Korean name
- Hangul: 명동
- Hanja: 明洞
- RR: Myeong-dong
- MR: Myŏng-dong

Myeong-dong (Note: Also spelled Myeongdong) (Korean: 명동) is a dong (neighborhood) in Jung District, Seoul, South Korea. It is between Chungmu-ro, Eulji-ro, and Namdaemun-ro. Myeongdong is known for being one of Seoul's main shopping, parade route, and tourism districts. In 2023, it was listed as the ninth most expensive shopping street in the world. The area is known for its two historically significant sites, namely the Myeongdong Cathedral and the Myeongdong Theater. Performances at Myeongdong Nanta Theater are popular.

Myeongdong covers 0.99 km^{2} with a population of 3,409.

== History ==
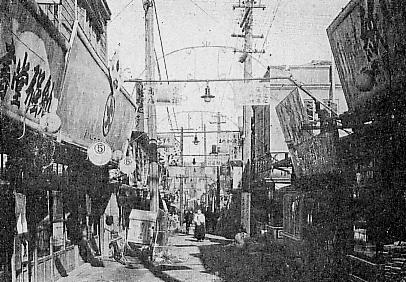
Myeongdong during the Japanese colonial period

During the Joseon period, the area was called Myŏngnyebang (명례방; 明禮坊), Myŏngnyebanggol (명례방골), or Chonghyŏn (종현; 鍾峴). It was then considered part of the southern part of the Joseon capital Hanseong (early name for Seoul). In 1914, during the early Japanese colonial period, it was renamed Meiji-cho (Japanese: 明治町; Korean: 명치정; MR: Myŏngch'ijŏng), after the Japanese Emperor Meiji. It then became more of a commercial district, being influenced by the rising commerce in the neighboring Chungmuro area. It officially became the district of Myeongdong in 1946, after independence.

After the Korean War and into the 1960s, the economy blossomed and the financial sector from Namdaemun-ro and Euljiro gradually expanded into Myeongdong. The area flourished as city renovations took place and highrise buildings were built. Many department stores, shopping centers, restaurants, upscale shops and boutiques set up their businesses in Myeongdong and it became popular with the young and trendy in the 1970s.

Besides being a major commercial and financial district, Myeongdong has been a popular location for political demonstrations and protests, especially during the turbulent years of the 1980s and 1990s. Myeongdong Cathedral has been a frequent spot for many of these demonstrations and still is to this day.

As of March 2000, Myeongdong has been designated as a special Tourism Promotion Area and is one of the stops on the official Seoul City Bus tour's main route.

== Description ==
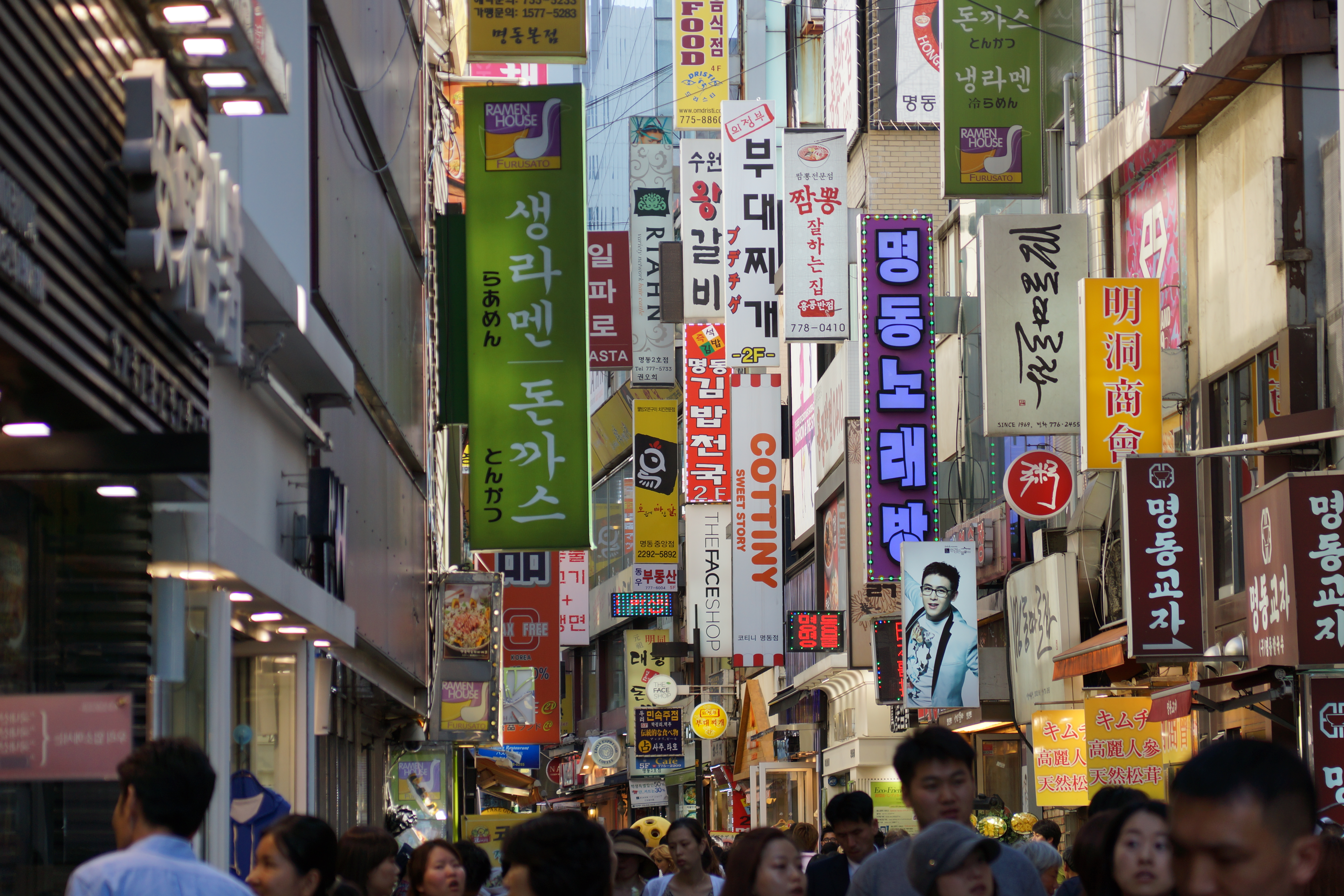
Signs above a Myeongdong street (2012)

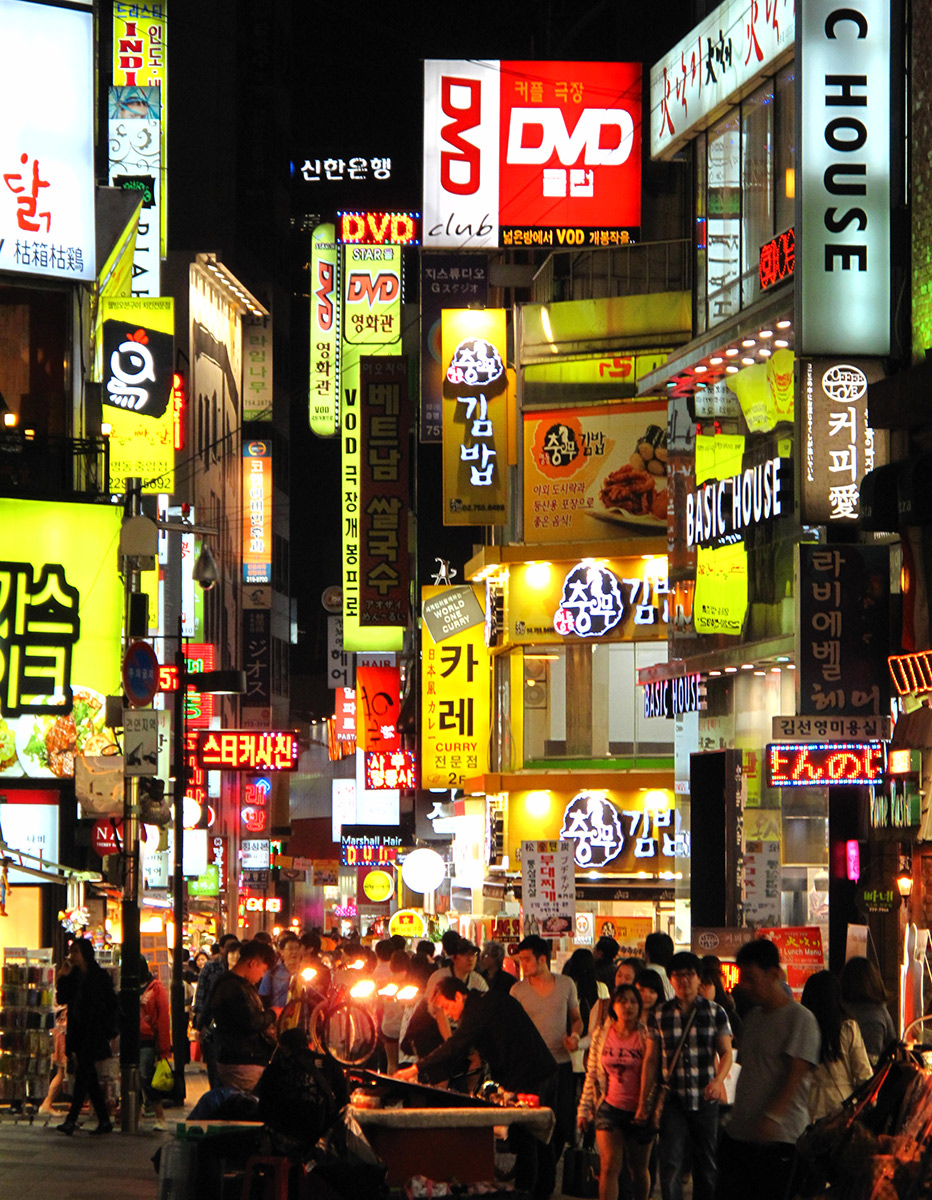
Myeongdong lit up at night (2011)

Seoul's financial hub is divided between Myeong-dong and Yeouido where the Korea Stock Exchange is located. Major insurance, securities, financial services companies, and investment firms with headquarters in Myeongdong include Citibank, SK Corporation, Kookmin Bank, Korea Exchange Bank, Lone Star Funds, Sumitomo Mitsui Banking Corporation, AIG Korea Insurance, Hana Bank, and HSBC. The Bank of Korea is also in the vicinity.

Other notable landmarks in Myeongdong include the Chinese Embassy, which was first opened on January 4, 1949. YWCA headquarters, UNESCO Hall, Myeongdong Theater, and the oldest Catholic cathedral in Korea: Myeongdong Cathedral.

Except for early morning and late night delivery hours, the main street and most of the alleys are blocked off for pedestrians to roam freely without being hindered by traffic.

It has an international school, Seoul Chinese Primary School.

=== Luxury shopping ===
Myeongdong is one of Seoul's main shopping districts featuring mid-to-high priced retail stores and international brand outlets as well as Korean cosmetics brands. It is a particularly popular area for young people and tourists as a center for fashion and sight-seeing. Several large shopping centers and department stores are in the district.

In August 2012, as part of Lotte Department Store's expansion programme into China, a replica of the street of Myeongdong was featured in its new store in Tianjin.

The floating population of Myeongdong is estimated to be around 2 million a day and in terms of floorspace rents, Myeongdong is one of the most expensive shopping districts in the world. Many hotels, restaurants, cinemas, theaters, and historical sites complete the diverse mixture of the area. In a poll of nearly 2,000 foreign visitors, conducted by the Seoul Metropolitan Government in November 2011, stated that 13.4 percent named shopping in Myeongdong as their favorite activity in Seoul.

== Tourist attractions ==
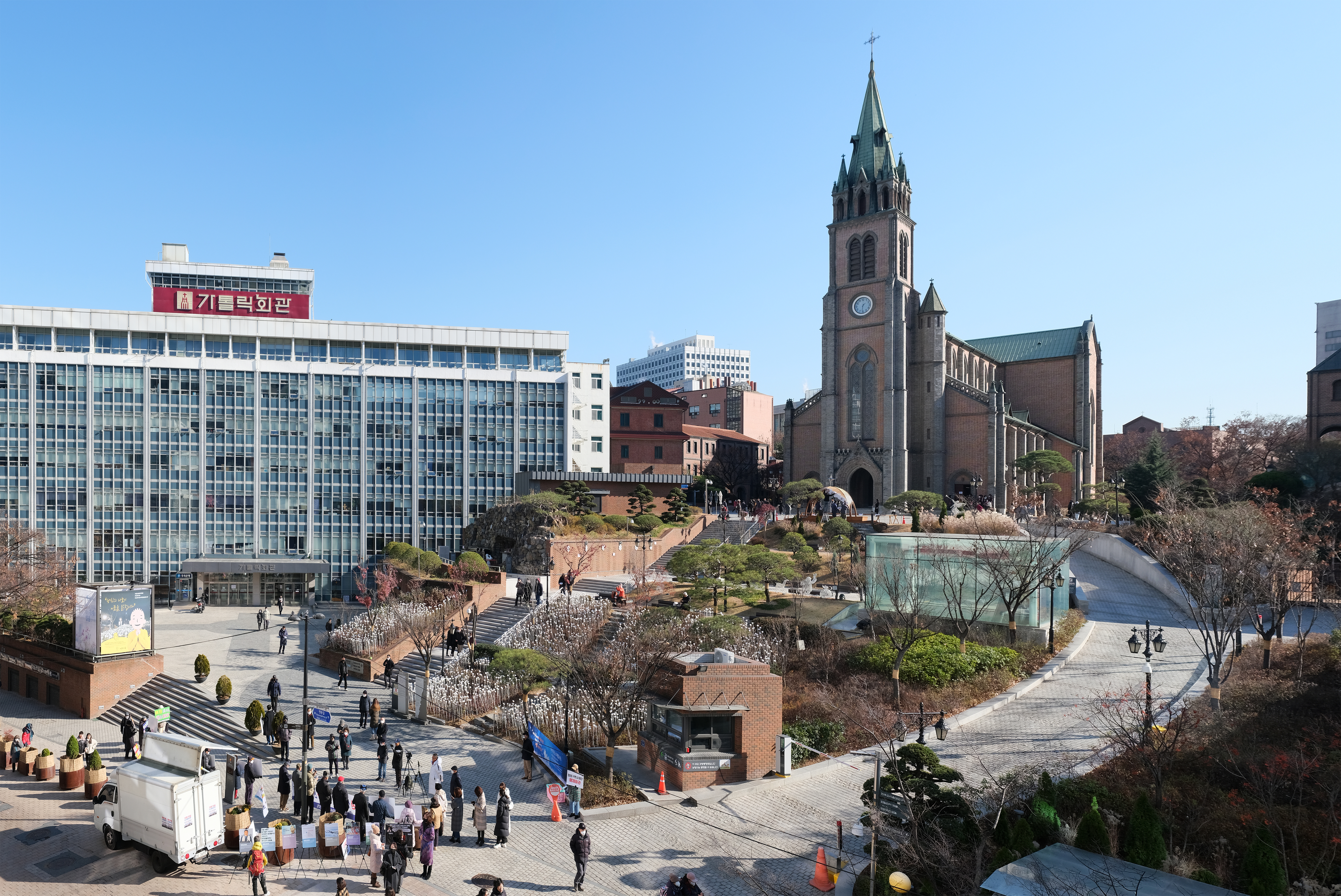
The Myeongdong Cathedral, a popular tourist attraction towards the end of the shopping district.

Built in 1898, the Myeongdong Cathedral is a prominent and traditional landmark of the Myeongdong area.

Myeongdong Festival has been hosted since 1982 to vitalize the commercial area and encourage tourism. It is usually held twice a year: from the end of March to the middle of April in spring, and the month of September in autumn. Parades, music and dance performances, fashion shows and other spectacles are part of the festivities. Many shops and stores offer product sales and discounts during this time as well.

In 2012, the area hosted the street parade of the Cheonan World Dance Festival in October.

== Local transportation ==
The southern part of Myeongdong is served by Station #424, Myeongdong on Line 4 of the Seoul Subway, while the northern area is closer to Station #202, Euljiro 1-ga on Line 2.

== Gallery ==
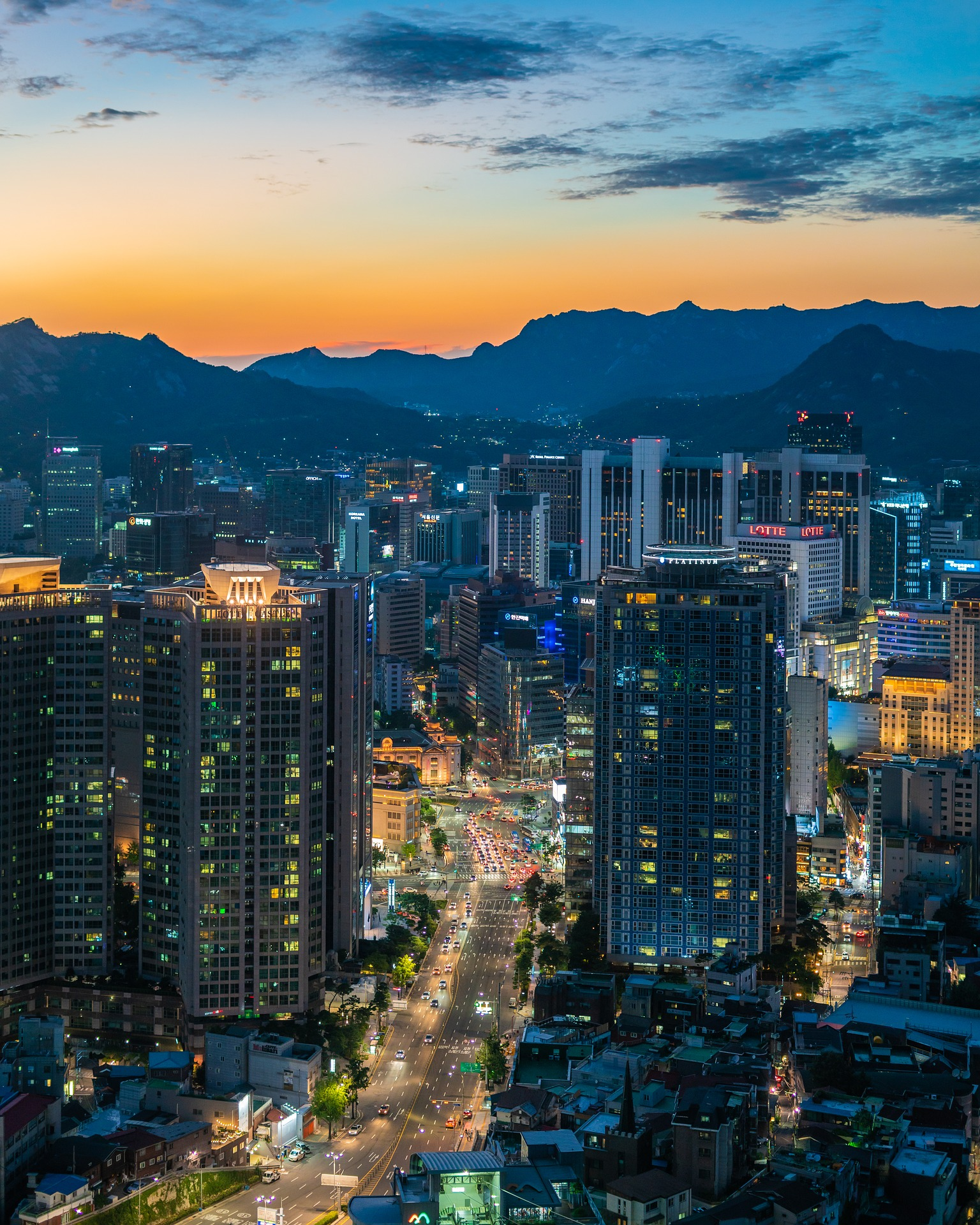
Dusk over Myeongdong (2018)

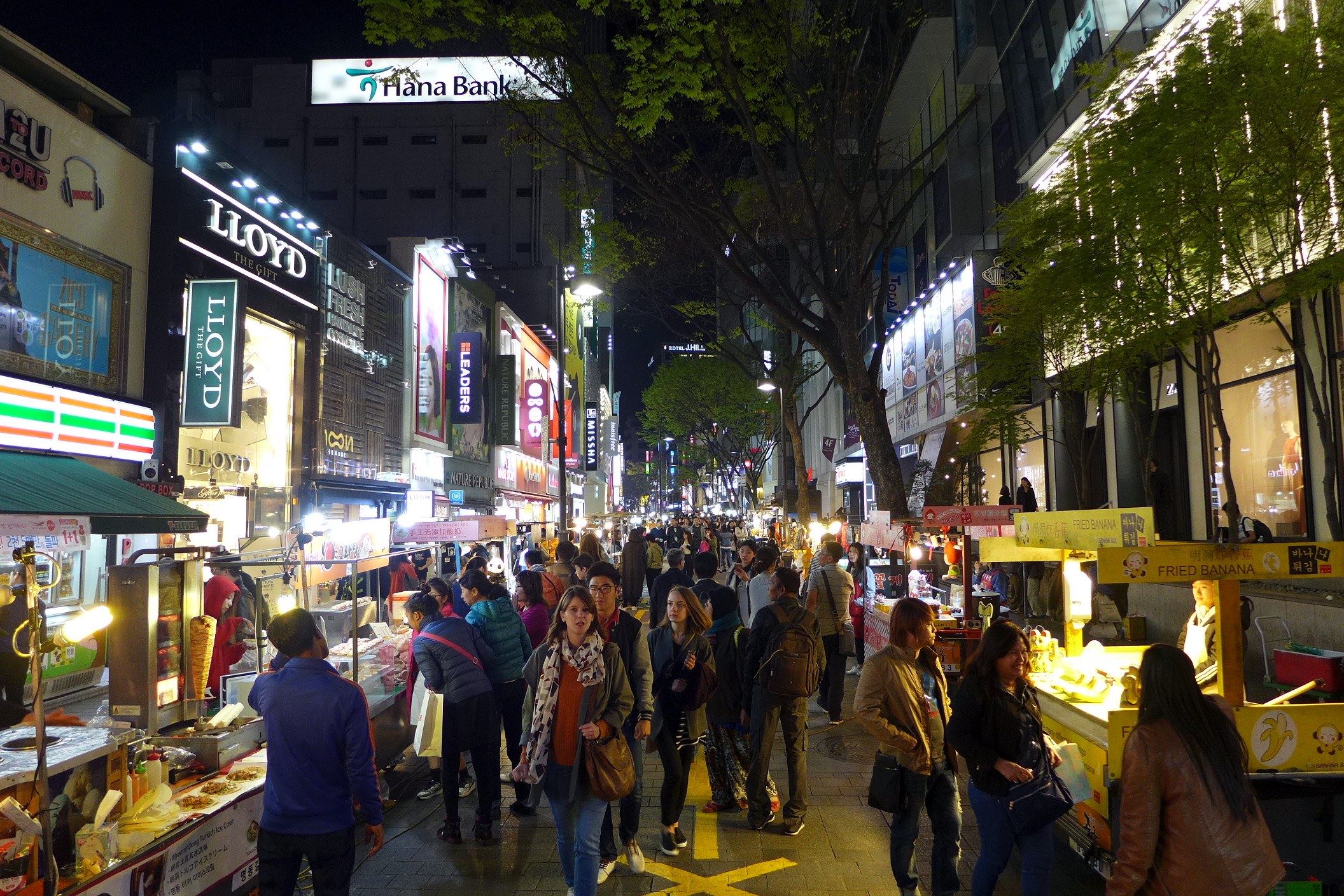
Crowded shopping streets at night (2016)

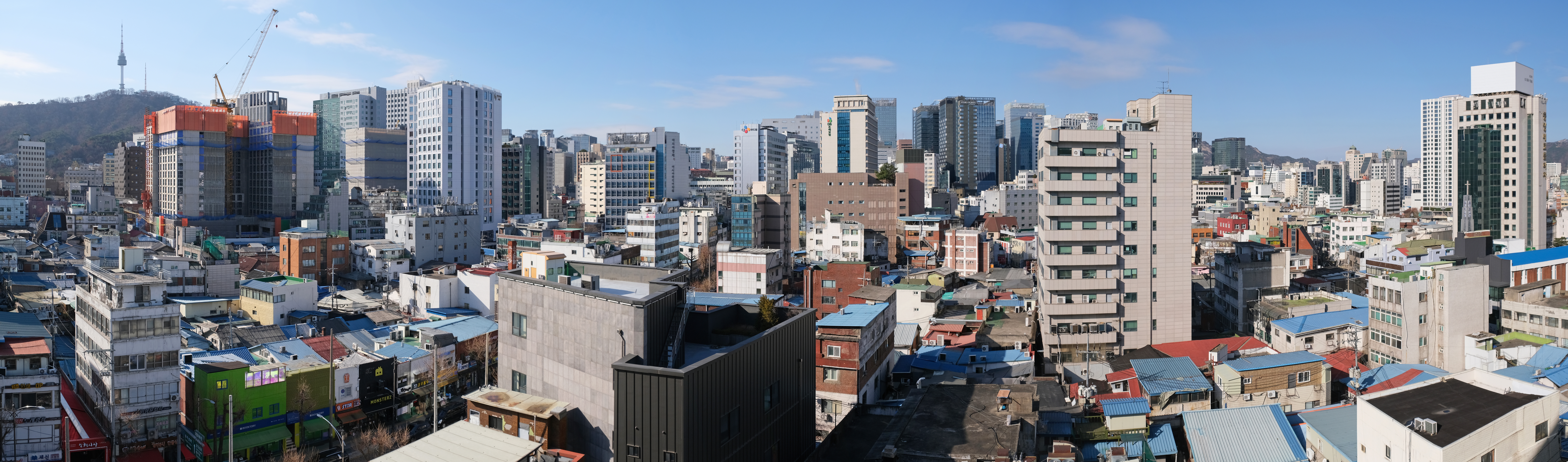
Panorama of the area from the PJ Hotel (2022)

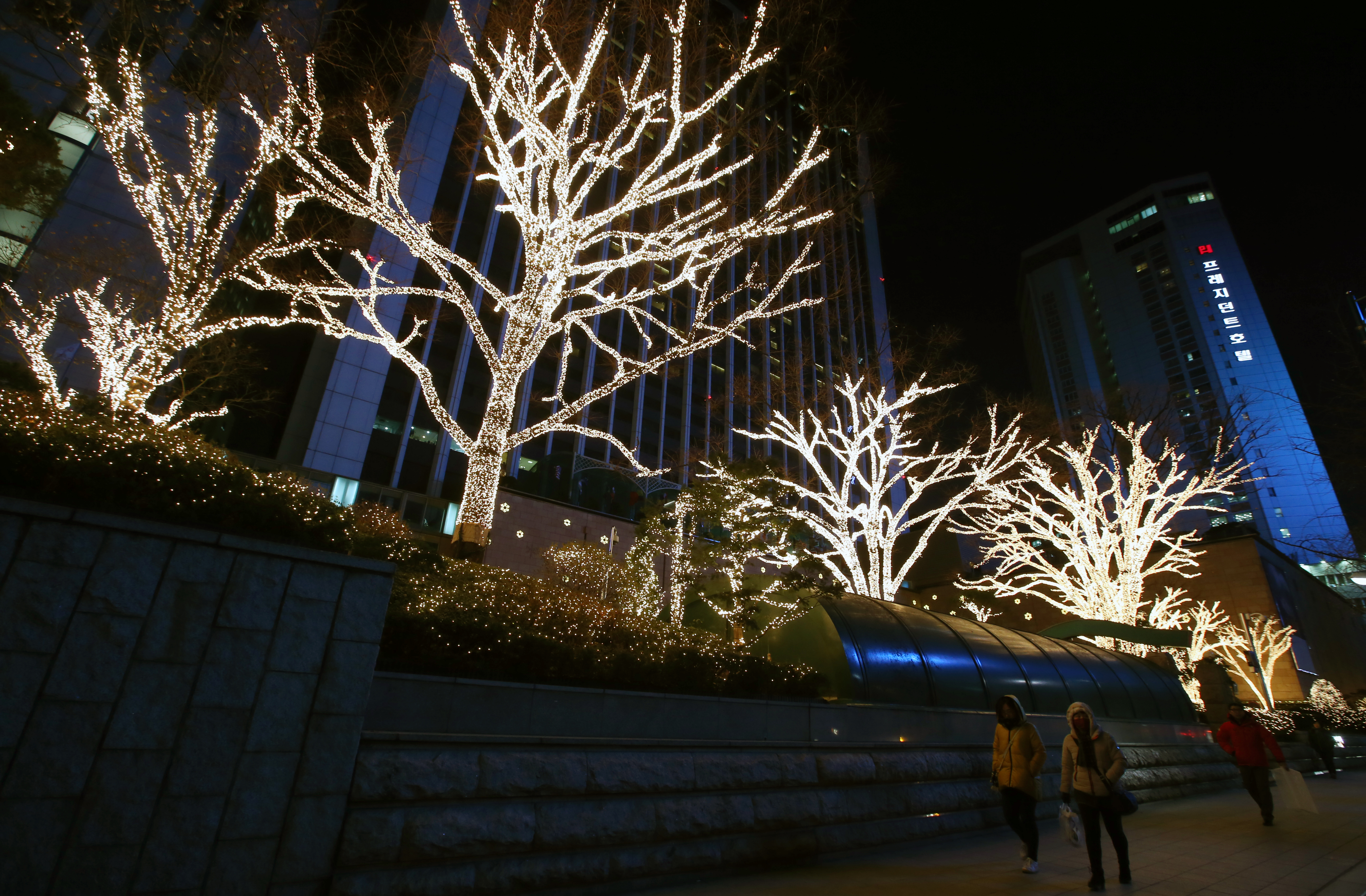
Trees lit up in December 2017

== See also ==
- Hongdae (area)
- Myeongdong Cathedral
- List of upscale shopping districts
- Economy of South Korea
