= Euljiro 4(sa)-ga station =

Train station in South Korea

Coordinates: 37°34′0″N 126°59′53″E

을지로4가 (케이뱅크); Euljiro 4(sa)-ga (Kbank)
을지로4가 (케이뱅크); Euljiro 4(sa)-ga (Kbank)
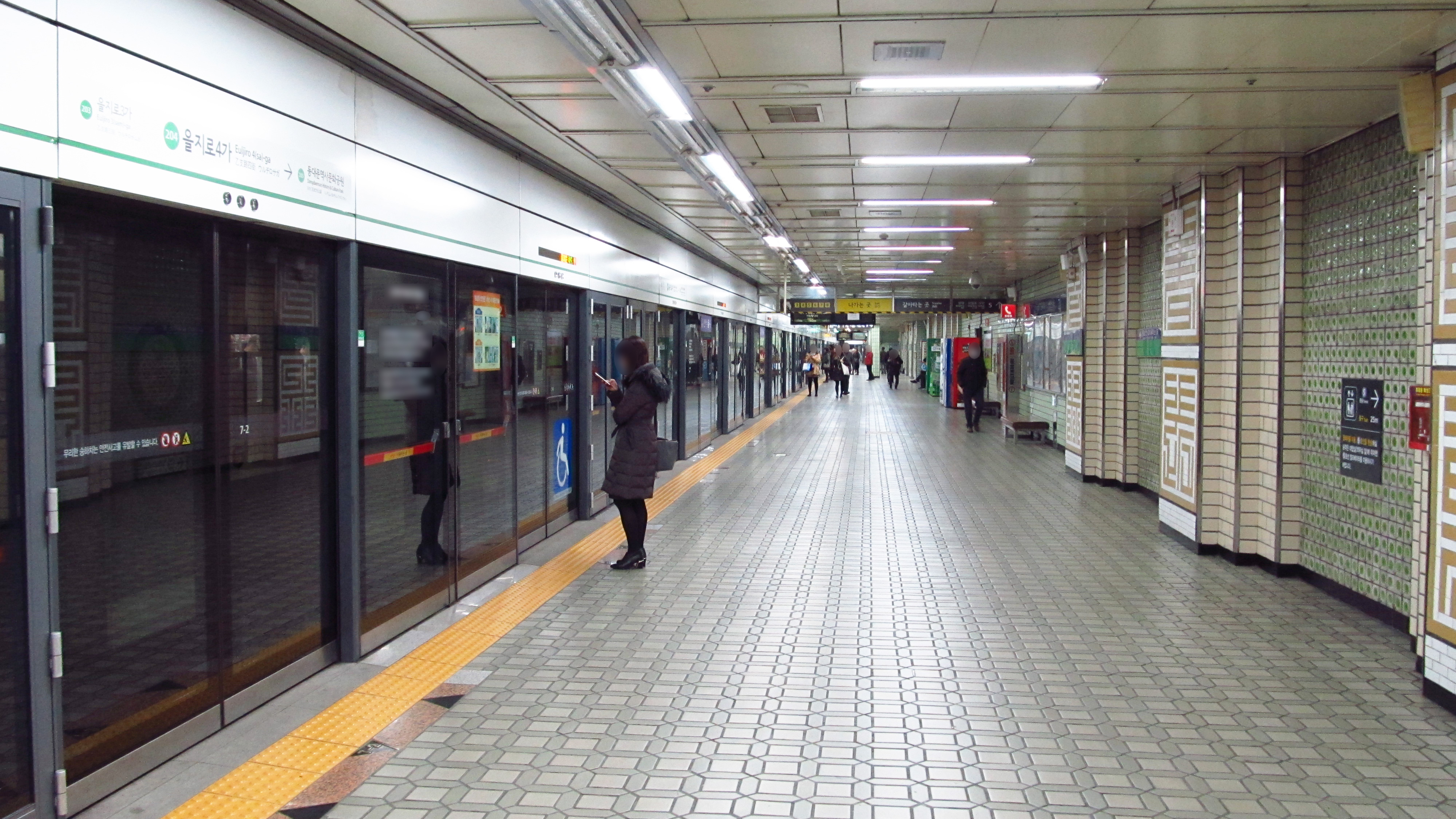
- Station Platform (Line 2)

Korean name
- Hangul: 을지로4가역
- Hanja: 乙支路4街驛
- Revised Romanization: Euljirosaga-yeok
- McCune–Reischauer: Ŭlchirosaga-yŏk

General information
- Location: 261 Euljiro 4-ga, Jung-gu, Seoul
- Operator: Seoul Metro
- Lines: Line 2 Line 5
- Platforms: 3
- Tracks: 4

Construction
- Structure type: Underground

Key dates
- September 16, 1983: Line 2 opened
- December 30, 1996: Line 5 opened

Passengers
- (Daily) Based on Jan-Dec of 2012. Line 2: 24,635; Line 5: 9,463
Services
Preceding station	Seoul Metropolitan Subway	Following station
Euljiro 3(sam)-ga Next counterclockwise	Line 2	Dongdaemun History & Culture Park Next clockwise
Jongno 3(sam)-ga towards Banghwa	Line 5	Dongdaemun History & Culture Park towards Hanam Geomdansan or Macheon
Location

Euljiro 4(sa)-ga is a station on the Line 2 and Line 5 of the Seoul Metropolitan Subway.

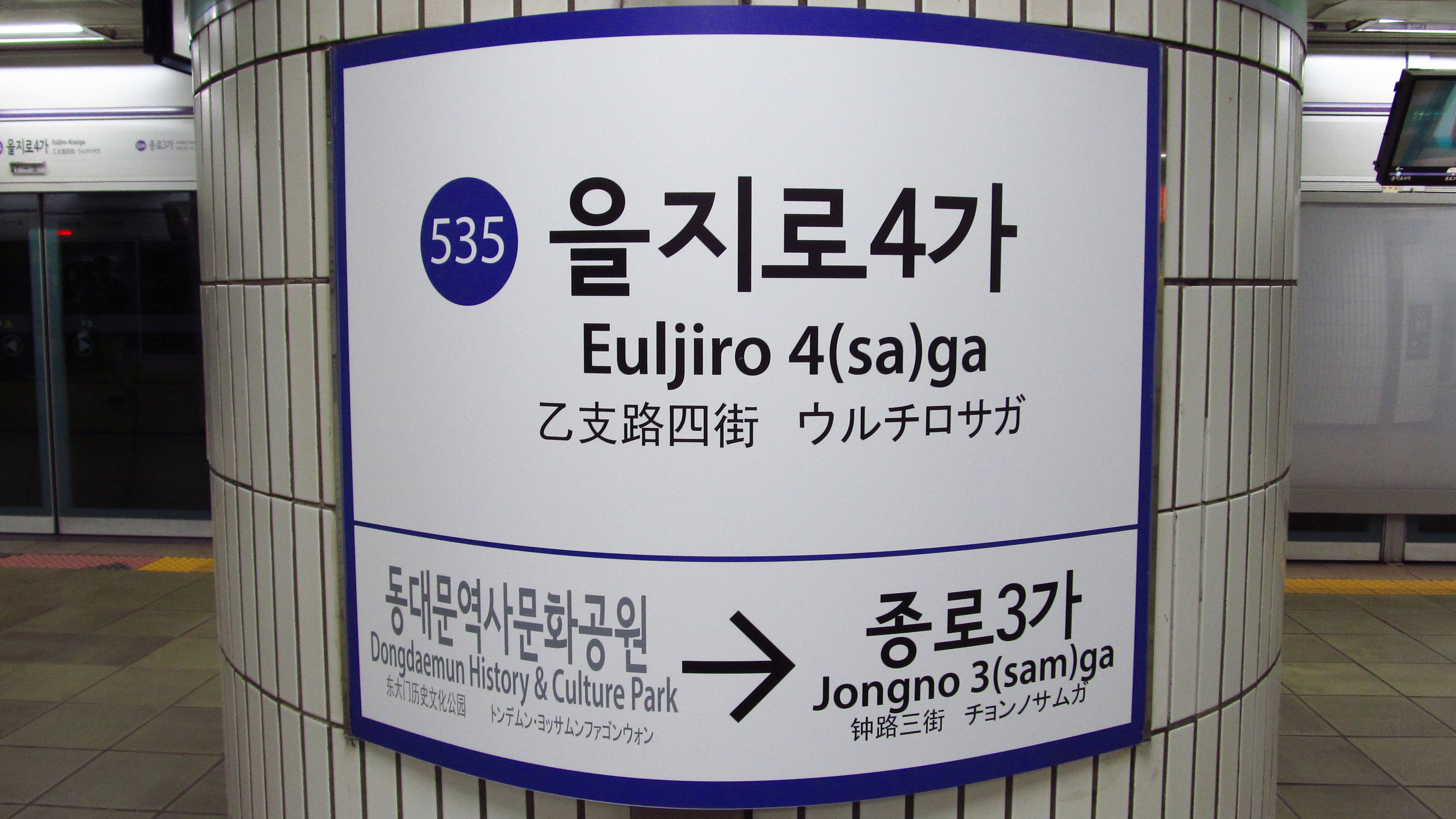
Station sign (Line 5)
