= Eastern =

Eastern or Easterns may refer to:

== Transportation ==
=== Airlines ===
- China Eastern Airlines, a current Chinese airline based in Shanghai
- Eastern Air, former name of Zambia Skyways
- Eastern Air Lines, a defunct American airline that operated from 1926 to 1991
- Eastern Air Lines (2015), an American airline that began operations in 2015
- Eastern Airlines, LLC, previously Dynamic International Airways, a U.S. airline founded in 2010
- Eastern Airways, a defunct British regional airline
- Eastern Provincial Airways, a defunct Canadian airline that operated from 1949 to 1986

=== Roads ===
- Eastern Avenue (disambiguation), various roads
- Eastern Parkway (disambiguation), various parkways
- Eastern Freeway, Melbourne, Australia
- Eastern Freeway Mumbai, Mumbai, India

=== Other ===
- Eastern Railway (disambiguation), various railroads
- SS Eastern, a cargo liner in service 1946-65
- Eastern Quarry, part of the Ebbsfleet Valley development in Kent

== Education ==
- Eastern University (disambiguation)
- Eastern College (disambiguation)

== Sports ==
- Easterns (cricket team), South African cricket team
- Easterns cricket team (Zimbabwe), Zimbabwean cricket team
- Eastern Sports Club, a multi-sports club in Hong Kong, notable for its football and other section
  - Eastern Sports Club (basketball), their basketball section

== Other uses ==
- The Eastern (film), 2018 documentary film
- The Eastern (Raleigh), a skyscraper in Raleigh, North Carolina
- The Eastern (Atlanta), event venue in Atlanta
- Eastern Broadcasting Limited, former name of Maritime Broadcasting System, Canada
- Eastern Daily Press, a regional newspaper published in Norwich, England
- 12th (Eastern) Division, a division of the British Army during the First World War
- 12th (Eastern) Infantry Division, a division of the British Army during the Second World War
- Eastern Electricity, a defunct supply and distribution utility in England
- Eastern Savings and Loans, a credit union, based in Ipswich, United Kingdom
- Eastern Television, a cable TV network in Taiwan
- Eastern Time, United States
- Of or pertaining to the Eastern world
- Eastern Circuit, a Hindi film distribution circuit, comprising East and Northeast India and also Nepal and Bhutan
- Deven Eastern (born 2003), American football player

== See also ==
- Eastern District (disambiguation)
- Eastern Province (disambiguation)
- Eastern Region (disambiguation)
- Eastern Suburbs (disambiguation)
- Eastern Division, Fiji
- Ostern (Pseudo-German for "Eastern"), or "Red Western", Soviet and Eastern bloc countries' version of Western movies
- East (disambiguation)
