= Pubs in Ipswich =

There have been a large number of pubs in Ipswich. The term covers a number of different sorts of public houses, including coaching inns, beerhouses, taverns hotels and alehouses. However, many of the distinctions which existed between these words have sometimes been lost as the terms became blurred.

== Prevalence of pubs in Ipswich ==
In 1689 a survey listed 25 inns and taverns in the parishes of Ipswich. In 1807 the number of taverns and beerhouses peaked at 313, which included off licence establishments. By 1893 there were 308 establishments, which fell to 277 shortly before the first world war.
