= Far East University =

Far East University may refer to:

- Far East University (Korea), Gamgok-myeon, Eumseong county, North Chungcheong province, South Korea
- Former name of CTBC University of Technology in 2006–2024, a university in Tainan, Taiwan
- Former name of Chinese Culture University in 1962–1963, a university in Taipei, Taiwan
- Communist University of the Toilers of the East, Moscow, USSR; also known as the Far East University
- Fareast International University, Dhaka, Bangladesh; also known as the Far East University

== See also ==
- Far Eastern University, Manila, the Philippines
- Far Eastern Federal University, Vladivostok, Russia
- Far East (disambiguation)
- Eastern University (disambiguation)
- University of the East
