= Busan Shanghai Street =

Chinatown in Busan, South Korea

Busan Shanghai Street 상해거리 Busan Chinatown
- Tourist Special Zone / Chinatown
- Busan Chinatown Special Zone 부산 차이나타운특구
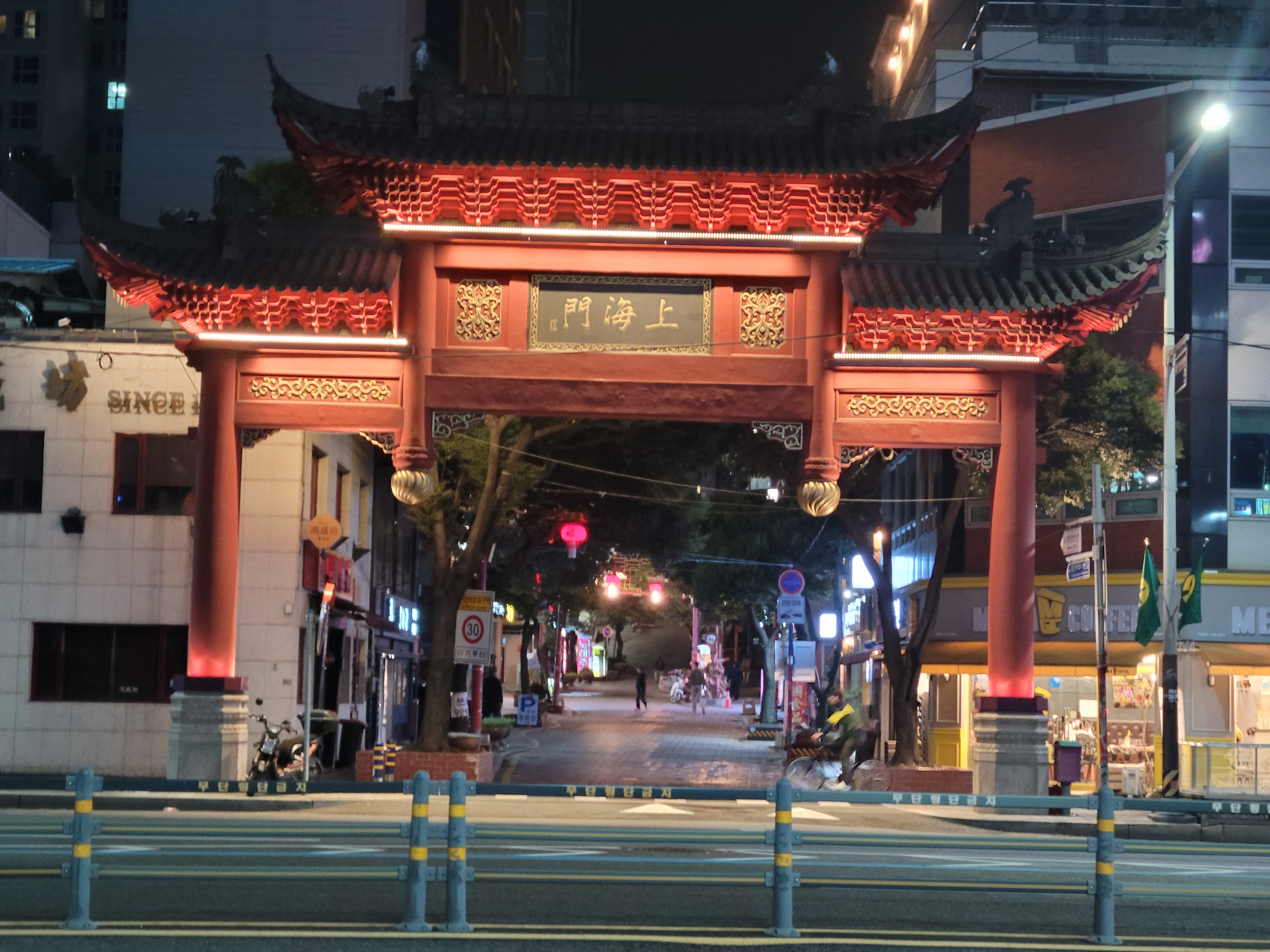
- Shanghai Gate
- Nickname: Shanghai Street
- Country: South Korea
- Metropolitan City: Busan
- District: Dong-gu
- Administrative dong: Choryang-dong (초량동)
- Established: 1884 (Establishment of the Qing Consulate)
- Designated as Special Zone: 2007

Government
  - Governing Body: Dong-gu Office, Busan
- Website: Shanghai Street: Visit Busan – Attractions

Busan Chinatown Special Zone (Korean: 부산 차이나타운특구), also known as Busan Shanghai Street (Korean: 상해거리), is a Chinatown located in Choryang-dong, Dong District, Busan, South Korea. Its history can be traced back to the late 19th century. In 1884, the Qing dynasty dynasty established a consulate there (then known as the Qing Consulate), after which overseas Chinese gradually settled around the consulate area, forming the largest Chinese community in Busan.

In 1993, Busan and Shanghai established a sister city relationship, after which the "Shanghai Gate" archway, symbolizing the friendship between the two cities, was constructed in the area. The district was subsequently officially named "Shanghai Street". In 2007, the area was designated by the South Korean government as the country’s only official Chinatown Special Zone. In addition to the presence of a Chinese school and the Choryang Modern History Museum, the area is home to numerous Chinese restaurants operated by overseas Chinese residents. It is especially well known for its dumpling dishes. With growing exposure through social media and popular culture, including the film Oldboy, the district gradually gained wider recognition and has since become one of Busan’s representative exotic tourist attractions.

== History ==
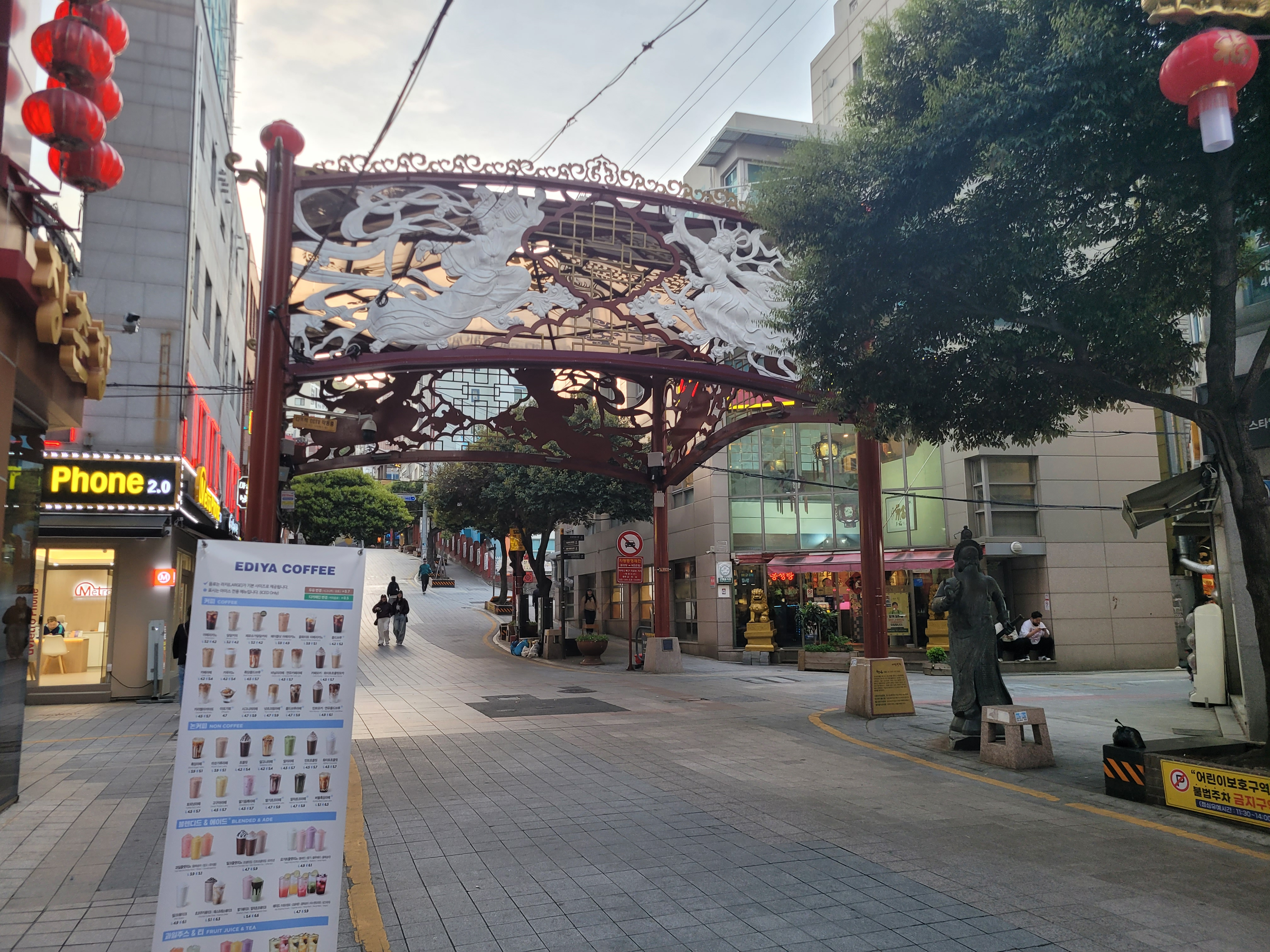
Attractions

The development of Busan Shanghai Street can be traced back to the late 19th century. In 1884, the Qing government established a consulate near Busan Port in the then Joseon Kingdom, which local residents referred to as the "Qing Consulate" ("Cheonggwan"). Following the establishment of the consulate, overseas Chinese gradually settled in the surrounding area and founded Chinese schools, allowing the district to gradually develop into a Chinese community.

After entering the 20th century, the district experienced several social and political changes. Following the end of World War II, Korea was liberated from Japanese colonial rule, and the area around the Qing Consulate was transformed into a different type of commercial district due to the frequent presence of U.S. troops. At one point, it was known as Texas Street. In the late 1980s, driven by port trade, large numbers of Russian sailors and Southeast Asian merchants entered the area to conduct goods trading, which gradually led the district to develop into a commercial street centered around foreign residents and visitors.

In 1993, Busan and Shanghai officially established a sister-city relationship. To strengthen exchanges between the two cities, they jointly renovated the overseas Chinese residential area in Choryang-dong and constructed the "Shanghai Gate" archway as a symbol of friendship. The district was also officially renamed "Shanghai Street". To further promote tourism and preserve its unique cultural landscape, the Busan Metropolitan Government began hosting the "Busan Chinatown Festival" in 2004. In 2007, the South Korean government officially designated the area as the country’s only "Chinatown Special Zone".

== Landscape ==
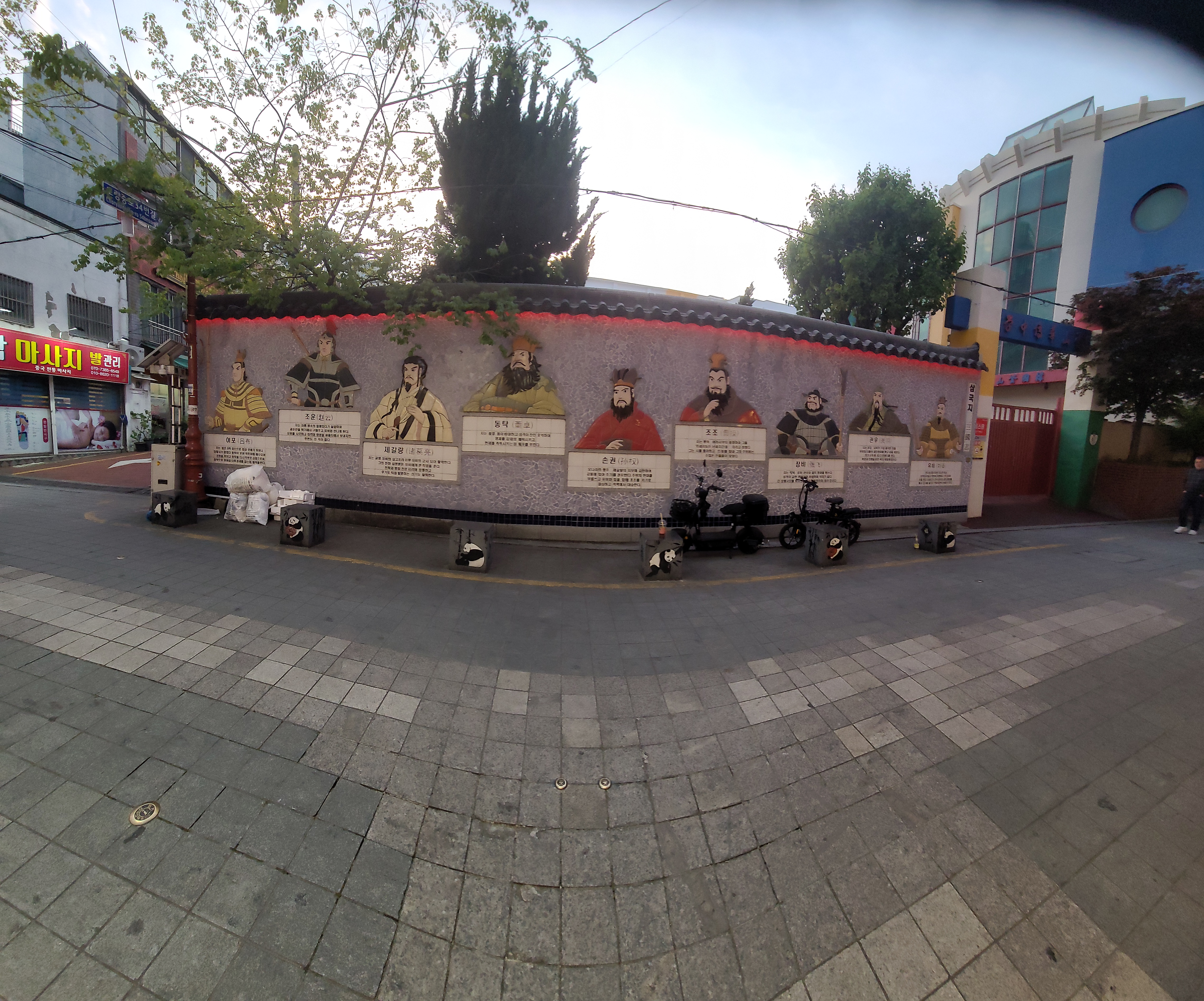
The exterior walls of Busan Overseas Chinese School are decorated with murals depicting classic scenes from Romance of the Three Kingdoms.

The architectural design of Busan Shanghai Street features a strong Chinese style, with representative archways located at both ends of the district. The "Shanghai Gate" at the entrance symbolizes the sister-city relationship between Busan and Shanghai. It is supported by red pillars, topped with traditional Chinese-style roof tiles, and bears its name in gold lettering. At the opposite end of the street stands the "Donghwa Gate," which features a similar architectural style and serves as a landmark of the area. Within the district, visitors can see decorative arches spanning the alleyways and rows of hanging red lanterns, creating a distinctive exotic atmosphere.

The decorations throughout the district incorporate numerous elements of Chinese history and culture. For example, the exterior walls of Busan Overseas Chinese Middle and High School feature murals depicting famous scenes from the Chinese classic novel Romance of the Three Kingdoms, presented in a comic-style format. In addition, traditional Chinese-style pavilions and display boards introducing notable figures from Chinese history can also be seen along the streets. At the entrance of the Choryang Modern History Museum, portraits of the Four Great Beauties of ancient China—Xi Shi, Wang Zhaojun, Diaochan, and Yang Guifei—are displayed. The building itself combines black roof tiles, red pillars, and gold-trimmed decorations, reflecting an architectural style that blends both Korean and Chinese influences.

== Culture and events ==
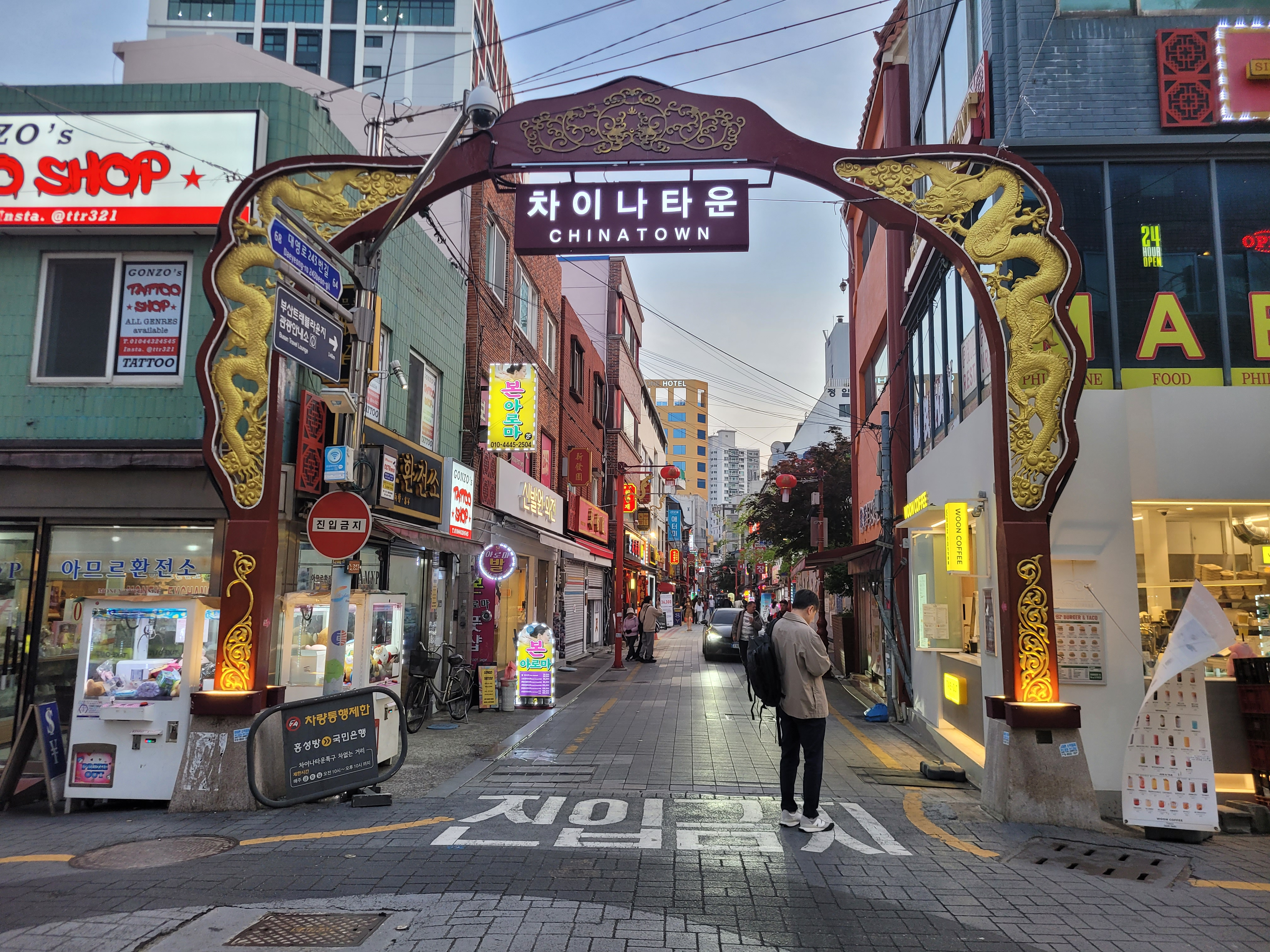
An archway spanning the alley

As South Korea’s only Chinatown Special Zone, Busan Shanghai Street regularly hosts the "Busan Chinatown Special Zone Cultural Festival" each year to promote the area’s historical culture and exotic atmosphere. The festival features a variety of traditional Chinese performances, including lion dances, Chinese martial arts demonstrations, guzheng performances, and displays of imperial-style costumes. Activities such as sky lantern releasing and tea ceremony experiences are also held, attracting large numbers of domestic and international visitors. The district is also connected to popular culture, particularly through the film Oldboy, which featured a memorable fried dumpling scene. As a result, Chinese restaurants and dumpling shops operated by overseas Chinese residents in the area have become popular destinations for film fans and tourists.

== See also ==
- Texas Street – nearby themed street
