= Falcon Inn =

Falcon Inn is the name of:

- The Falcon Inn, Arncliffe, a pub in North Yorkshire in England
- The Falcon, Battersea, a pub in London
- The Falcon, Chester, a pub in Cheshire in England
- Falcon Inn, Ipswich, a pub in Suffolk in England
- The Falcon, York, a pub in North Yorkshire in England
