= Gold Room =

Gold Room Private Museum
- Inside the 1923 Doc Lap gallery
- Established: May 11, 2019; 7 years ago
- Website: goldexhibition.com

The Gold Room Private Museum is a private museum located in Los Angeles. Designed in an Asian-inspired style, the gallery was created by Wang Shu—the first Chinese t to receive the Pritzker Prize. The museum officially opened on May 11, 2019. It houses artifacts reflecting a synthesis of Eastern and Western artistic influences, alongside collections of rare books, porcelain, ceramics, and antiquities. The holdings also include paintings from private collections, porcelain statuary, and works featuring mother-of-pearl inlay. A smaller satellite exhibition space—incorporating an archival section known is located at 1923 Độc Lập Alley in Vietnam, where it displays artworks by various artists alongside pieces held for auction or archival storage.
