= Northern Region =

Northern Region or variations may refer to:

== Africa ==
- Northern Region (Ghana)
- Northern Region, Eastern Cape, South Africa
- Northern Region, Malawi
- Northern Region, Nigeria (former)
- Northern Region, Uganda
- Nord Region, Burkina Faso
- North Region, Cameroon

== Americas ==
- Northern Region, Manitoba, Canada, a region situated on the Canadian Shield including Manitoba's Hudson Bay coastline
- AAA Northern Region, a sports league of large high schools in Virginia, United States
- North Region, Brazil, an official grouping of states for economic and statistical purposes

== Elsewhere ==
- Northern Region, Malta
- Northern Region (Sydney), alternative name for the northern suburb of Sydney in Australia
- Northern Region Film and Television Archive, an English organisation
- Uttar Pradesh (lit. 'northern region'), a state in northern India
- North Region, Singapore
- VUSO, the Ally occupied northern region of European Russia.

== See also ==
- Central Region (disambiguation)
- Eastern Region (disambiguation)
- Southern Region (disambiguation)
- Western Region (disambiguation)
- Northern (disambiguation)
