= Central Military Region =

Central Military Region may refer to:

- Central Military Region (Egypt)
- Central Military Region (Sweden)

== See also ==
- Central Military District
- Central Region (disambiguation)
