= Western Military Region =

Western Military Region may refer to:

- Western Military Region (Egypt)
- Western Military Region (Sweden)

== See also ==
- Western Military District
- Western Region (disambiguation)
