= 東區 =

東區 (pinyin: dōng qū), Korean Hanja reading of that term Dong-gu (동구), 东区 (Simplified Chinese), or 東区 (Japanese Higashi-ku), all literally meaning East District, may refer to the following:

== Japan ==
- Higashi-ku, Nagoya, Aichi Prefecture
- Higashi-ku, Fukuoka, Fukuoka Prefecture
- Higashi-ku, Hiroshima, Hiroshima Prefecture
- Higashi-ku, Sapporo, Hokkaido Prefecture
- Higashi-ku, Kumamoto, Kumamoto Prefecture
- Higashi-ku, Niigata City, Niigata Prefecture
- Higashi-ku, Okayama, Okayama Prefecture
- Higashi-ku, Sakai, Osaka Prefecture
- Higashi-ku, Hamamatsu, Shizuoka Prefecture
- Higashi-ku, Osaka merged with Minami-ku into Chūō-ku, Osaka

== Mainland China ==
- Dongqu, Panzhihua, Sichuan
- Dongqu Subdistrict, Zhongshan, Guangdong
- Dongqu Subdistrict, Huaibei, in Xiangshan District, Huaibei, Anhui
- Dongqu Subdistrict, Guangzhou, in Luogang District, Guangzhou, Guangdong
- Dongqu Subdistrict, Yima, Henan

== South Korea ==
- Dong District, Busan
- Dong District, Daegu
- Dong District, Daejeon
- Dong District, Gwangju
- Dong District, Incheon
- Dong District, Ulsan

== Taiwan ==
- East District, Chiayi
- East District, Hsinchu
- East District, Taichung
- East District, Tainan

== See also ==
- Eastern Avenue (disambiguation)
- Eastern District (disambiguation)
