= Overseas Chinese High School, Busan =

International school in Dong-gu, Busan, South Korea

- 釜山華僑中學 부산화교중고등학교

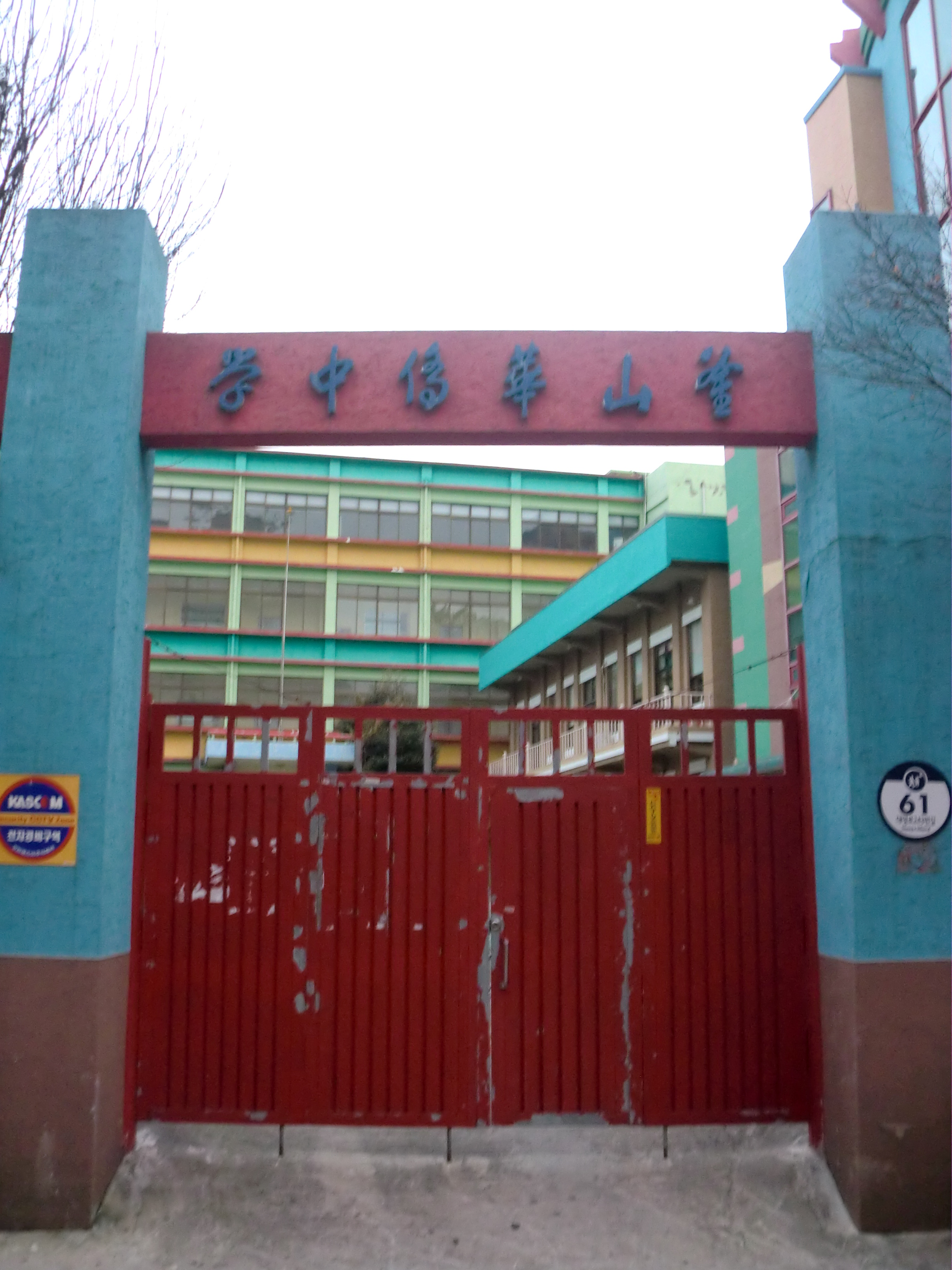
- The school building

Location
- 61 Daeyeong-ro 243beon-gil, Dong-gu; Busan, 48818; South Korea; 35°06′54″N 129°02′17″E

Information
- Type: Private international school
- Established: 1951; 75 years ago
- Principal: 張秀蘭
- Grades: Junior and senior high school
- Gender: Coeducational
- Enrollment: 55 (September 2026)
- Language: Chinese
- Website: www.kbchs.org

Overseas Chinese High School, Busan

Chinese name
- Traditional Chinese: 釜山華僑中學
- Simplified Chinese: 釜山华侨中学
Transcriptions
Standard Mandarin
- Hanyu Pinyin: Fǔshān Huáqiáo Zhōngxué
- Wade–Giles: Fu-shan Hua-ch'iao Chung-hsüeh

Korean name
- Hangul: 부산화교중고등학교

Overseas Chinese High School, Busan (Chinese: 釜山華僑中學; Korean: 부산화교중고등학교) is a Republic of China (Taiwan)-oriented Chinese international school in Dong-gu, Busan. It serves junior high school and senior high school students, and was established on 1 September 1951.
