= 168 stairs =

Outdoor stairway in Busan, South Korea

- Stairway
- 2019 appearance
- Steps: 168
- Address: 191 Yeongcho-gil, Dong District, Busan, South Korea
- Interactive map of 168 stairs
- Coordinates: 35.1172°N 129.0354°E

The 168 stairs (Korean: 168계단) are an outdoor stairway in Choryang-dong, Dong District, Busan, South Korea. The stairway has 168 steps and a steep incline of around 35 to 40 degrees, with various souvenir shops on the path.

The stairway has a monorail that goes from bottom to top that was installed in 2016. In May 2023, it was announced that they would replace the monorail with an inclined elevator that uses two rails. In March 2024, it was announced that an outdoor terraced movie theater would be installed along the stairway.

During the 1950–1953 Korean War, numerous refugees settled around the stairway.

== See also ==
- 40-step stairway – another famous staircase, also in Busan
