= Cock and Pye, Ipswich =

Historic pub in Ipswich

Cock and Pye
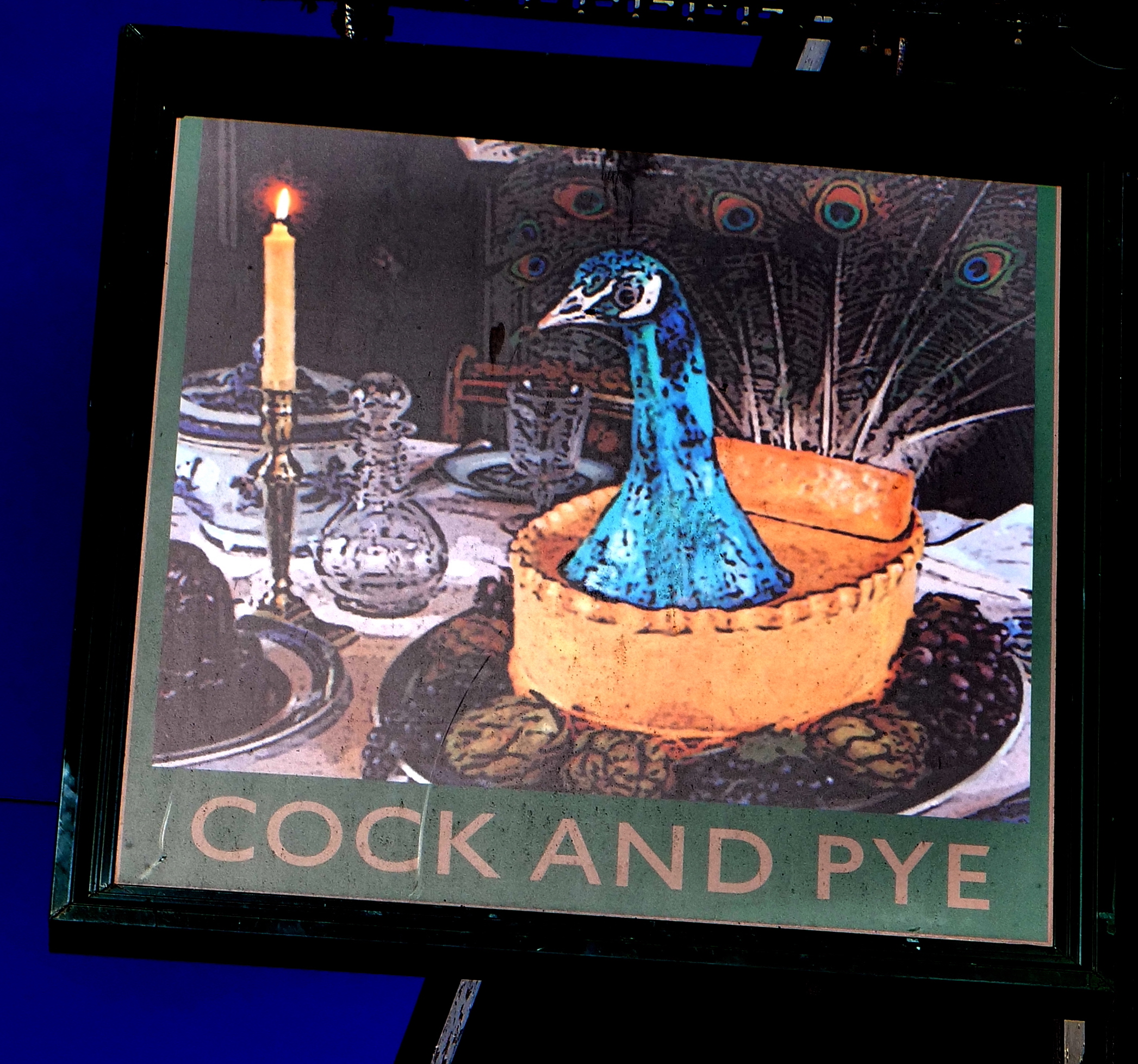

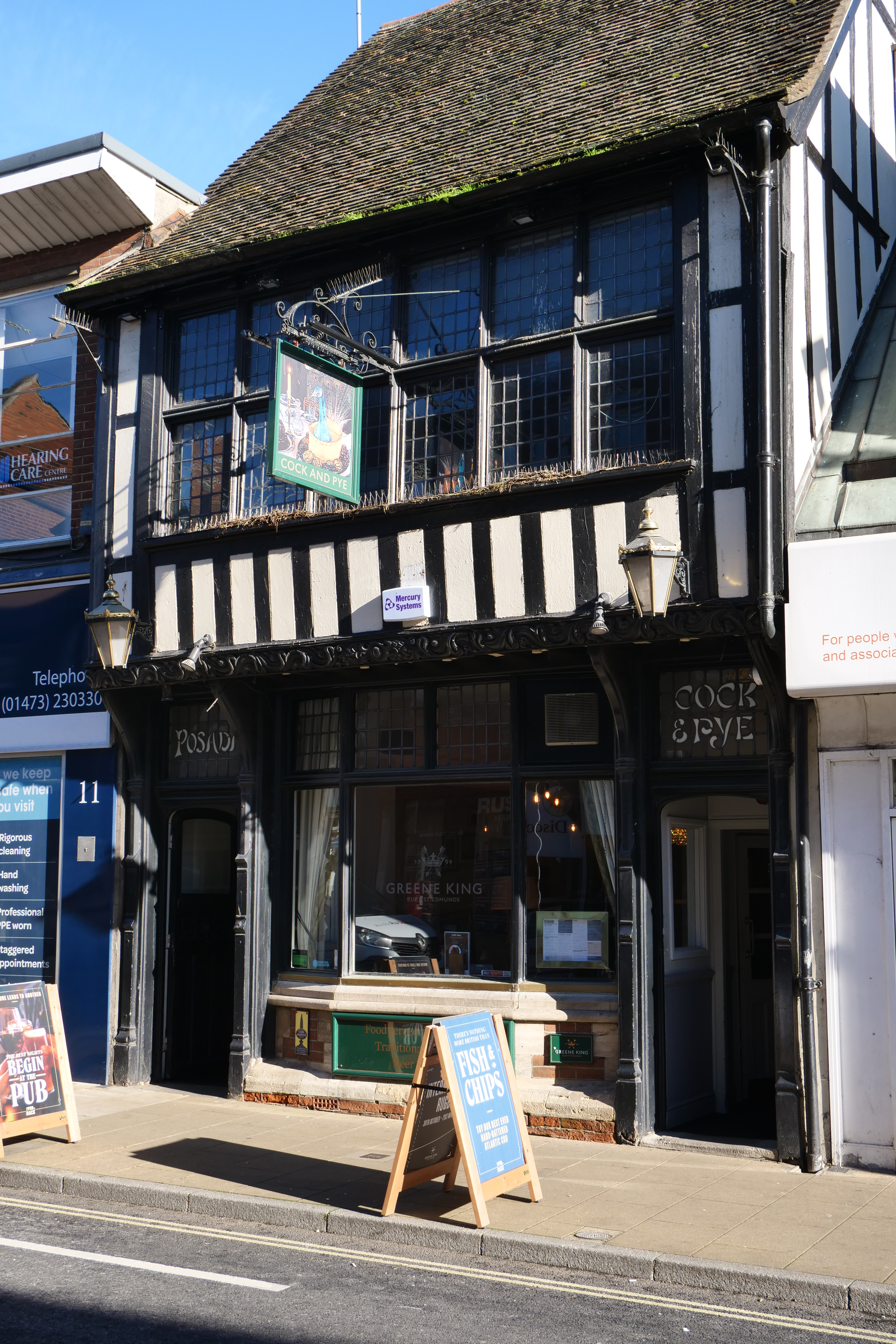
- Cock and Pye, November 2021
- Interactive map of Cock and Pye

Restaurant information
- Established: Before 1689
- Location: 13 Upper Brook StreetIpswich, Ipswich, Suffolk, England, IP4 1EG
- Coordinates: 52°03′26″N 1°09′23″E
- Website: https://www.greeneking-pubs.co.uk/pubs/suffolk/cock-pye/

The Cock and Pye is public house in Ipswich, Suffolk, England. It is located in Upper Brook Street. It was included in the 1689 list of pubs in Ipswich, where it was stated to be in St Margarets Parish, Ipswich. The pub was formerly a large coaching inn, but by the late nineteenth century, was much smaller.

As the name might suggest, the pub was setting for frequent cockfights and traditionally had a distinctive pub sign featuring a large pie upon which a cock was perched. When Cock fighting was banned in 1835 with the Cruelty to Animals Act 1835, a Mr Birch, the proprietor at the time endeavoured to sell the premises.

== Signage ==
The modern sign reproduces a design discussed by Charles Harold Evelyn-White in 1886:

The sign was once very common, now it is rarely to be met with. The Ipswich house formerly had a rude representation placed over the chief entrance of a huge Pie upon which a Cock was perched. At houses bearing this sign it would almost follow as a matter of course, that Cock fighting was one of the attractions offered. This vulgar and brutal sport was at its height in the 18th century and during this time, be it said to the discredit of the town, this shocking form of 'amusement' was indulged in to very a large extent, not only here but at several other taverns and such like places, the houses known as the "King's Head," and the "Fighting Cocks," in St. Helens, kept by one Joseph Clarke, being conspicuous among the number for catering to the depraved taste of a not over sensitive public, by affording opportunities of witnessing such inhuman spectacles; as those which at all times have, and while such practices exist, must continue to disgrace the English nation. Advertisements relating to these sad exhibitions being held at Ipswich houses, may be found in the old files of the "Ipswich Journal," couched in words which leave us in but little doubt that feelings of horror, such as would be now almost universally felt, were then exceedingly rare.
