= East of England Co-operative Society =

Consumer co-operative in the United Kingdom

East of England Co-operative Society Limited
- Trade name: East of England Co-op
- Formerly: Ipswich Co-operative Society Limited (1886–1993); Ipswich and Norwich Co-operative Society Limited (1993–2005)
- Type: Consumer co-operative
- Industry: Food retail, funeral services, travel agents, security
- Founded: 3 March 1868; 158 years ago
- Headquarters: Wherstead Park, Suffolk, England
- Key people: Andy Rigby (CEO)
- Revenue: £395 million (2023)
- Members: 97,581 Active (2025/26)
- Number of employees: 3,000 (2026)
- Website: eastofengland.coop

East of England Co-operative Society Limited, trading as East of England Co-op, is the third largest consumer co-operative in the United Kingdom after The Co-operative Group and Central England Co-operative. It is a registered society with its headquarters at Wherstead Park, near Ipswich and trading in the eastern counties of Essex, Suffolk, Norfolk, Hertfordshire and Cambridgeshire. The Society is the area's largest independent retailer.

== History ==
The East of England Co-operative Society is an amalgamation of smaller societies from across East Anglia which have joined together over the years. Most recently, the Colchester and East Essex Co-operative Society merged with the Ipswich and Norwich Co-operative Society in 2005.

The consumer co-operative movement has its roots in the early part of the nineteenth century and the principles of self-help and social equity that developed during the Victorian era. The first successful retail co-operative was established in 1844 by the Rochdale Pioneers. The Ipswich and Norwich Society was the product of an amalgamation, in 1993, of the Ipswich Co-operative Society (known as the Ipswich Industrial Co-operative Society from 1868 to 1968 and incorporating, since 1991, the engagements of the former Stowmarket Society, established 1889) and the Norwich Co-operative Society (formed in 1858). The Colchester and East Essex Society was founded as Colchester Co-operative Society in 1861, expanding through merger with the following co-operative societies:

Society	Established	Transferred
Tiptree Self Help	1895	1921
Clacton		1931
Coggeshall Heart-in-Hand		1945
Harwich, Dovercourt and Parkeston		March 1967
Maldon		Nov. 1967
Witham		June 1970
Earls Colne		Aug. 1970

== Activities ==
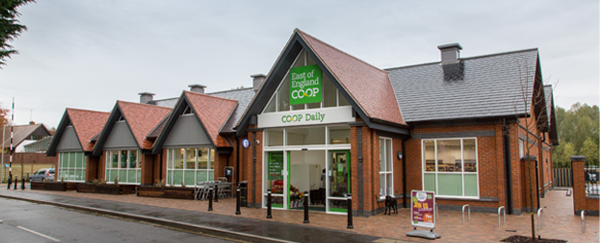
East of England Co-op food store in Coggeshall, Essex

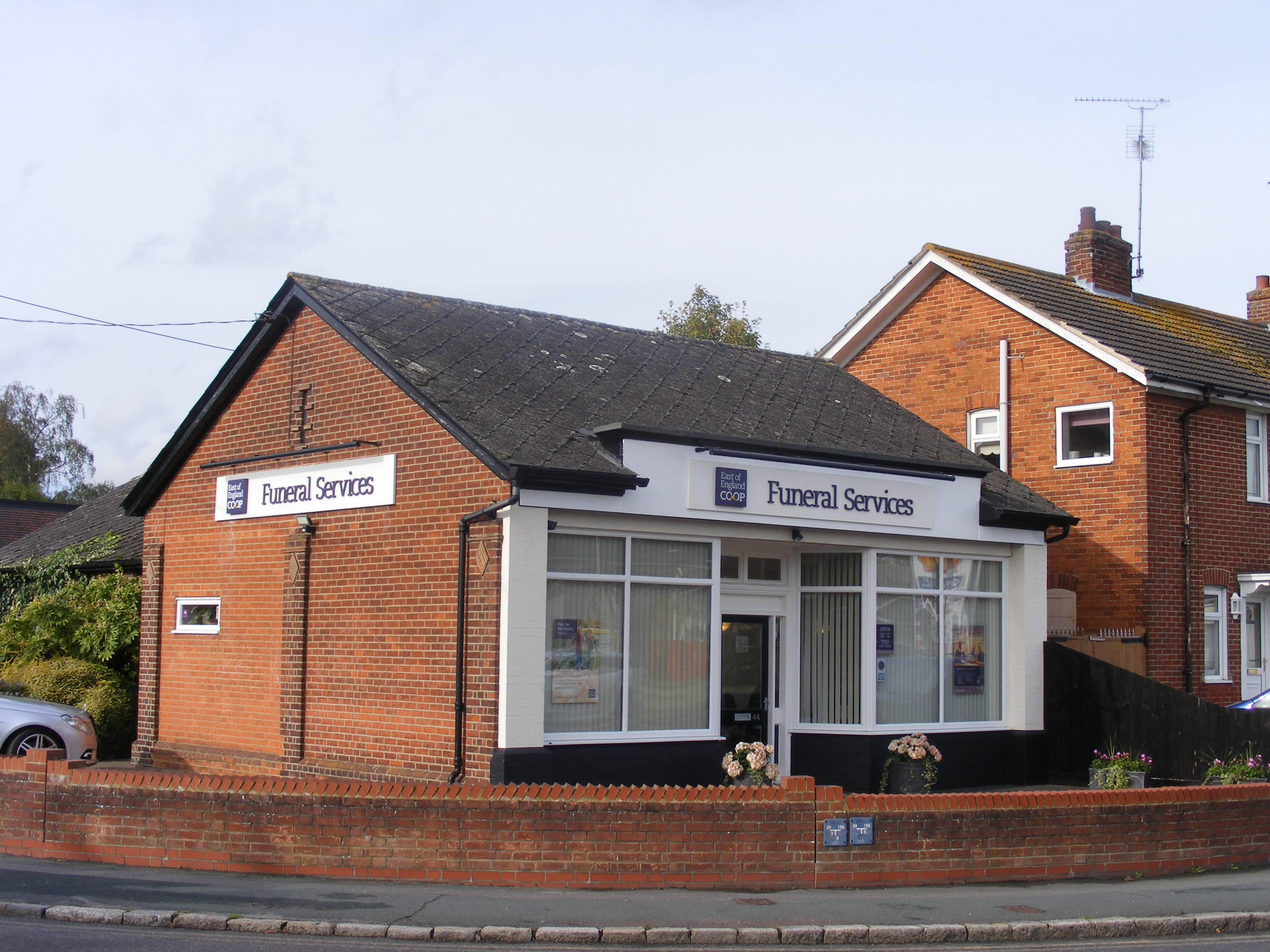
East of England Co-op Funeral Services office in West Mersea, Essex

The East of England Co-op’s principal business activities are food retailing, funeral services and management of its investment property portfolio. They also have interests in petrol forecourts, travel agents and a security business called Co-op Secure Response.

It previously ran a dairy with doorstep deliveries, but this was sold to Dairy Crest in early 2008 and their department stores and a jewellery store were sold to Vergo Retail in 2009. In 2010 their car dealerships were also sold to various owners. In early 2019 the Society sold its pharmacy and optical businesses.

The Society is a corporate member of the Co-operative Group, sourcing its food through the national buying programme, the Co-operative Federal Trading Services.

In 2020, the East of England Co-op launched the Community Cares Fund which gives grants to initiatives that address the theme of 'community cohesion and integration' within its trading area.

== Membership ==
Customers and employees who join the co-op as members receive a dividend card, which when presented at transaction enables them to receive points. These points are then allocated a monetary value, decided by the board and based on the organisation's profits that year.

Membership is open to all customers, colleagues and communities in the East of England Co-op's trading area. Members receive a share in the profits and in 2021 more than £1.8 million was issued as dividends.

== See also ==
- British co-operative movement
- Eastern Savings and Loans
