= East District =

East District may refer to:

- East Delhi, India
- East District, Chiayi, Taiwan
- East District, Hsinchu, Taiwan
- East District, Taichung, Taiwan
- East District, Tainan, Taiwan
- East District (Panzhihua), Sichuan, China
- East District (Zhongshan), Guangdong, China

== See also ==
- Eastern District (disambiguation)
- East Sikkim district
