= Wherstead Park =

Country house in Wherstead, Suffolk, England

Coordinates: 52.02262°N 1.14493°E

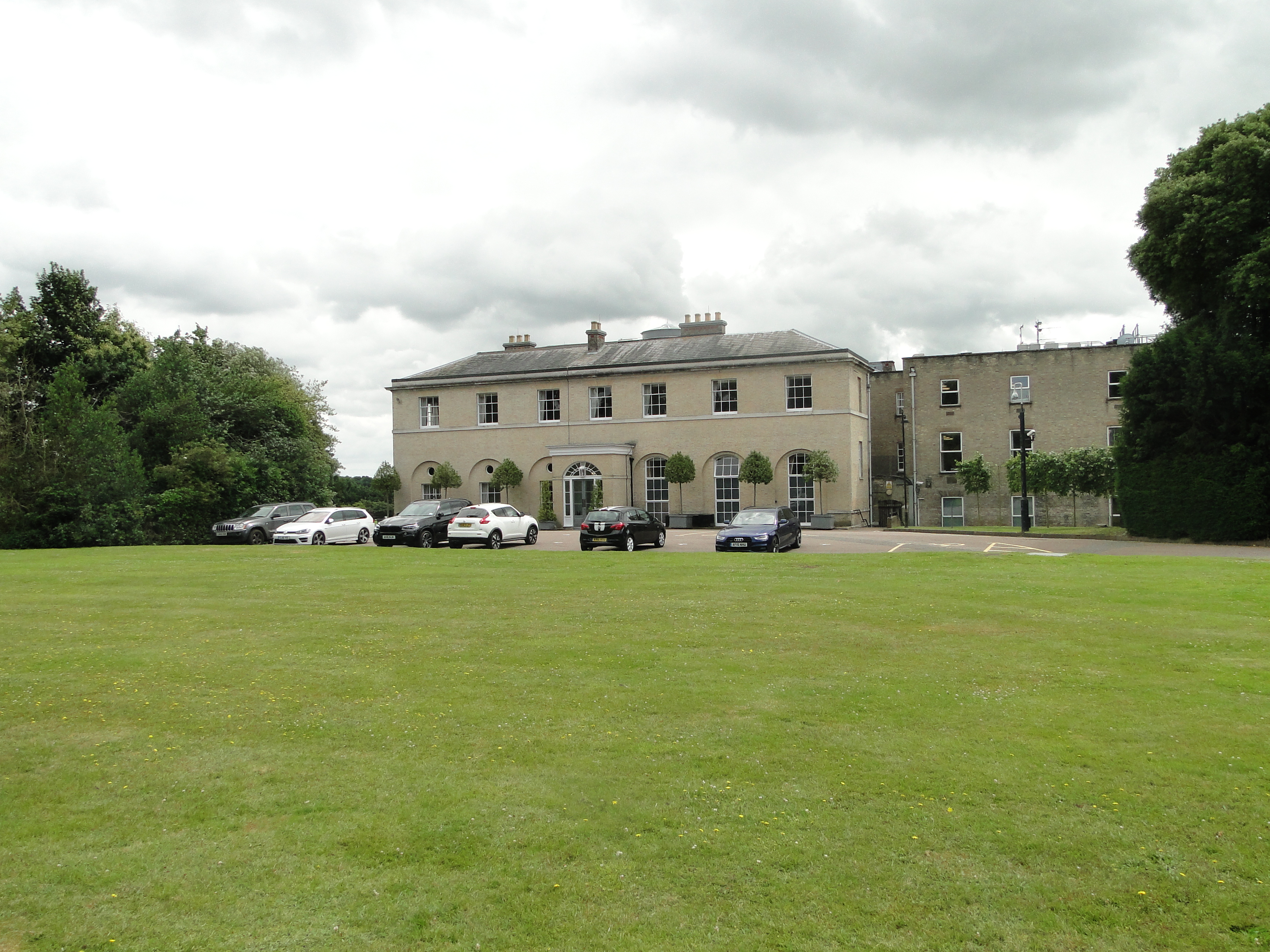
Wherstead Park Mansion

Wherstead Park Mansion in Suffolk is a house of historical significance and is listed on the English Heritage Register. It was built in 1792 for Sir Robert Harland (1765–1848) by the famous architect Sir Jeffry Wyatville on the site of an older house. It was the residence of many notable people over the next two centuries. It is now owned by the East of England Co-operative Society and is used as their Head office, as well as office space for tenants. It was previously a venue for weddings, conferences and special events, and before that was the headquarters of Eastern Electricity from 1948.

== Sir Robert Harland ==
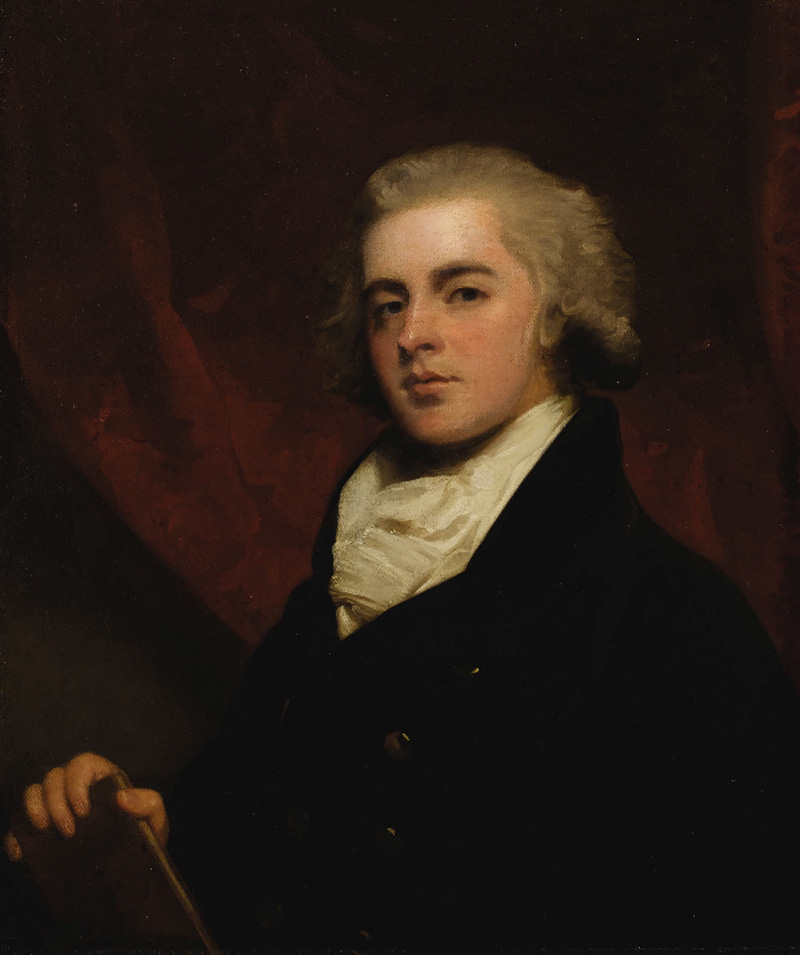
Sir Robert Harland

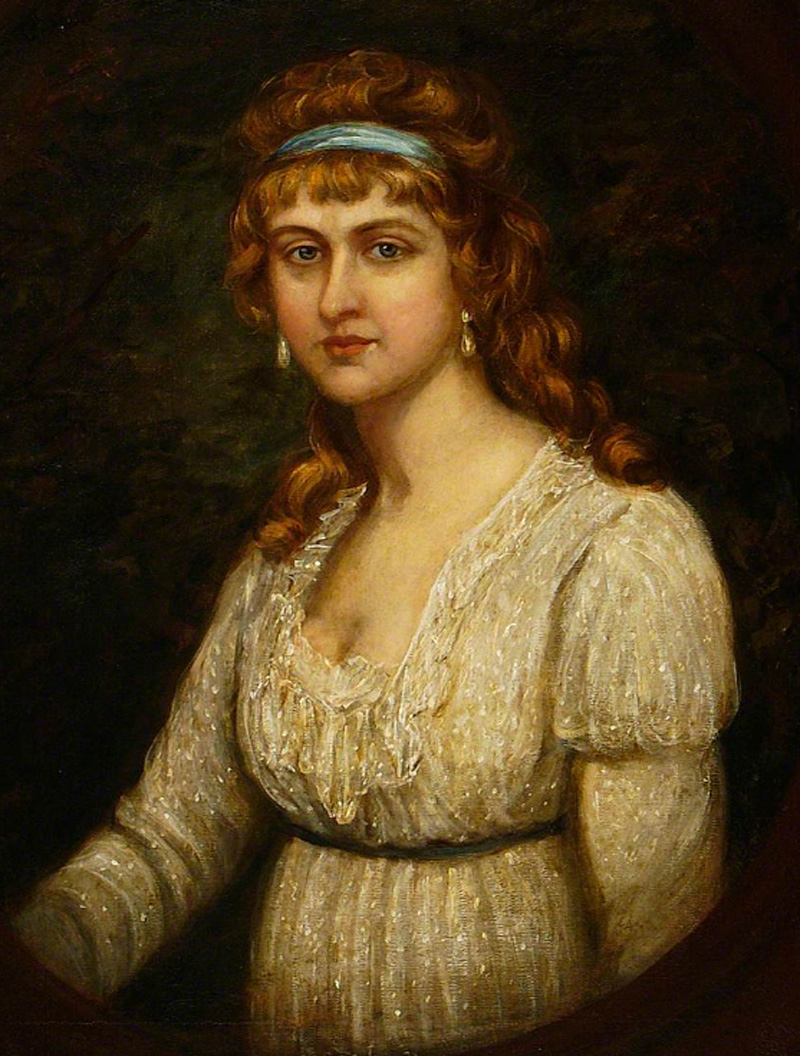
Lady Arethusa Harland

Sir Robert Harland (1765–1848) was born in 1765 in London. He was the son of Admiral Sir Robert Harland (1715–1785) who was a distinguished naval officer. When his father died in 1784 Robert inherited his estates which included Sproughton, Belstead as well as Wherstead. His father had bought Wherstead some years earlier from Thomas Wenman Coke and it had included an old manor house. In 1792 Robert removed this old manor house and commissioned Jeffry Wyatville to build the present house. He also employed the famous landscape architect Humphry Repton to design the gardens.

In 1801 he married Arethusa Vernon who was the daughter of Henry Vernon of Great Thurlow. Her brother was John Vernon (1776–1818) who owned Orwell Park near Ipswich. In 1813 Robert exchanged Wherstead Park for Orwell Park with his brother in law and he and Arethusa went to live there. While she was at Orwell Park Arethusa wrote some memoirs which still exist today.

John Vernon died in 1818 and as he was unmarried he left Wherstead Park to his sister Arethusa. From this time until 1824 the house was let to Granville Leveson-Gower, 1st Earl Granville and his wife Henrietta who held numerous house parties. Some of their guests included Prince Frederick, the Duke of York and the Duke of Wellington Henrietta was a notable society hostess and a biography called "Piety and Wit" was written about her life which includes her time at Wherstead Park.

From 1824 until 1835 the house was rented by John Fitzgerald (1775–1852) who at that time was a Member of Parliament. His son was the poet Edward Fitzgerald and some of his childhood at Wherstead Park is outlined in his biography.

The Harlands returned to live at Wherstead Park after this. Robert died there in 1848 and Arethusa in 1860. The Park was inherited by a distant relative the Rev Charles Jenkin who changed his name to Vernon to comply with the conditions of the inheritance. He died only three years later in 1863 without male issue and the house was inherited by Arethusa’s great nephew Charles Edmund Dashwood. This complex line of succession is explained in the extract shown below.

== Dashwood family ==
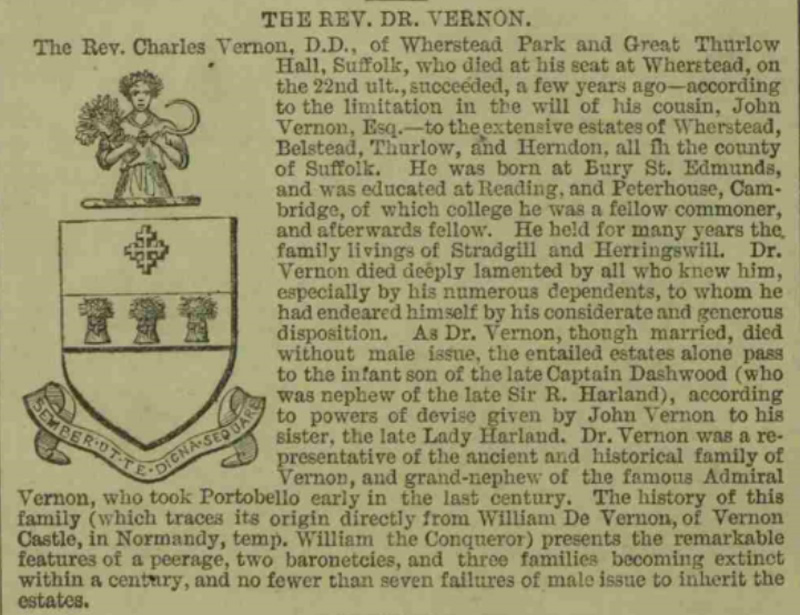
Extract describing how Wherstead Park was inherited by the Dashwoods

Charles Edmund Dashwood (1857–1935) was only six years old when he inherited Wherstead Park. His father Captain George Astley Dashwood had died only a few months before his inheritance so his mother Harriet took charge of the property until he came of age. Harriet was the daughter of 1st Baron Bateman of Shobdon. She married Captain George Astley Dashwood in 1854 and the couple had five children – two sons and three daughters. After George died she moved with her family to Wherstead Park and four years later in 1867 she married Lord Montagu William Graham. The 1871 Census shows the family living in the house with a governess, a butler, a house keeper, two footmen, two ladies maids, two housemaids, two laundry maids, a kitchen maid and a scullery maid. Lord Graham died in 1878.

Charles Edward Dashwood (1857–1935) assumed responsibility for Wherstead Park when he came of age and his mother Harriet moved to Grosvenor Square in London. Charles married Emma Baker in 1881 but the couple had no children. In 1914 at the outbreak of the War Charles and Emma converted part of the house to a Convalescing Hospital.
