= Texas Street =

Red-light district in Busan, South Korea

Texas Street Texas Town
- Red-light district
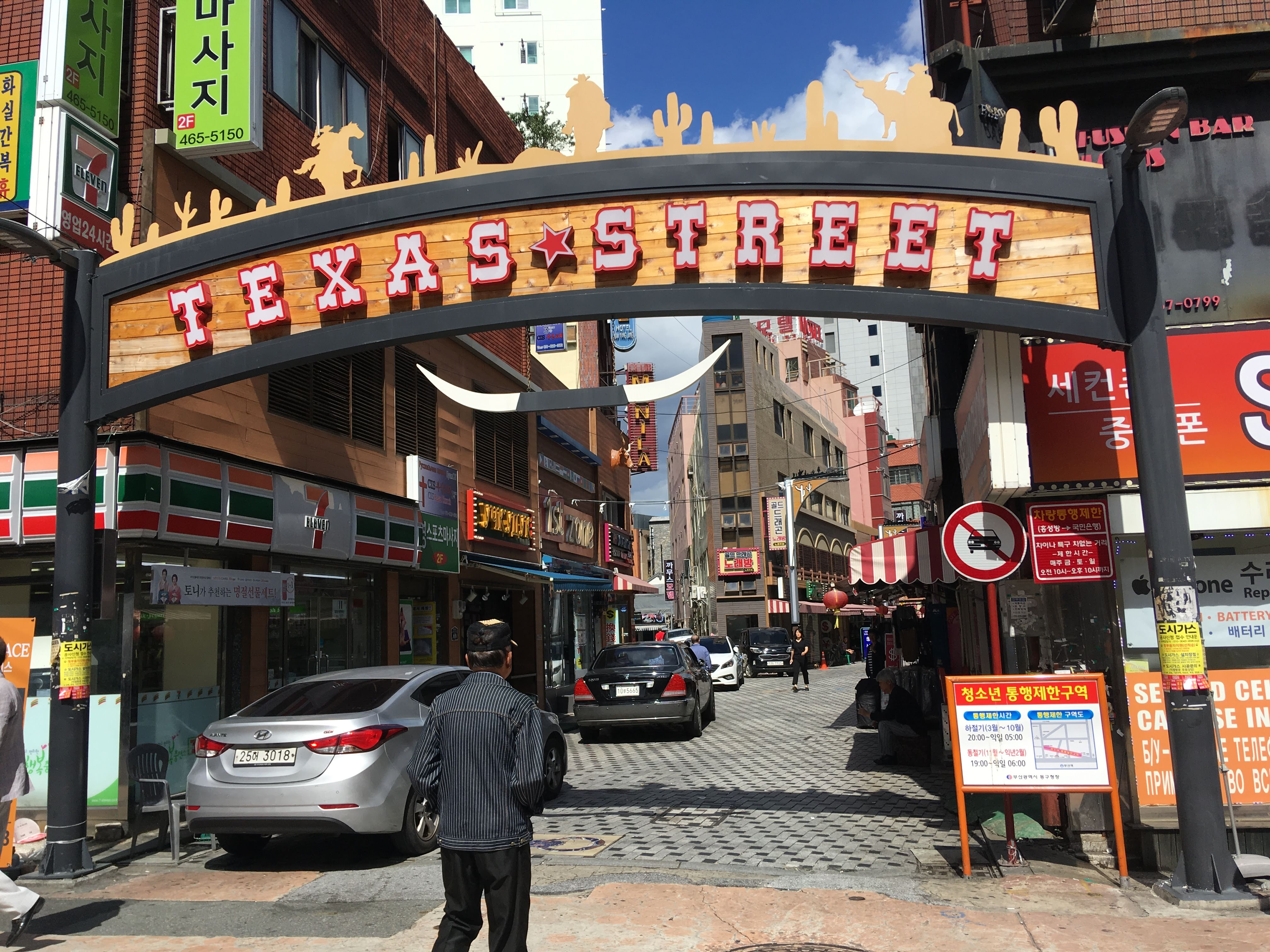
- An entrance to the street, with a recent sign installed as part of renovation efforts (2018)
- Interactive map of Texas Street
- Coordinates: 35.115377°N 129.039047°E
- Country: South Korea
- City: Busan
- District: Dong District
- Named for: Comparison to the American Wild West

Texas Street (Korean: 텍사스거리) or Texas Town (텍사스촌) is a red-light district and ethnic enclave in Dong District, Busan, South Korea. The area is just outside Busan station, and right next to the Busan Chinatown area.

The area once was a scenic beach area that catered towards Chinese ambassadors and merchants. Around this time, it was called Cheonggwan Street. Beginning around 1945, it became a red light district that provided a variety of services, although namely drinking and prostitution, to American soldiers in the area. The area has since shifted locations and decreased in size somewhat, especially after the 1953 Busan station fire.

The area's character has changed since the late 1980s. Fewer American troops were stationed nearby (U.S. Navy and Marines were prohibited from entering circa 2018), and more Russian sailors arrived. The area began to cater less towards entertainment, and more towards normal businesses. Hundreds of Russians and Koryo-saram (ethnic Koreans of the former Soviet Union) began moving into the area, making it an ethnic enclave. However, the area has still retained some of its red-light district nature, despite government efforts.

== History ==
=== Early history ===
The area around modern-day Choryang-dong was originally considered an open, scenic beach area, with white sands and pine trees. A Chinese consulate and land concession to Qing formerly occupied the area, and Chinese merchants set up there. Around this time, it was called Cheonggwan Street (청관거리; 淸官거리; lit. 'Qing Establishment Street').

=== United States military era ===
The area received its name around the time of the division of Korea, when the United States Army Military Government in Korea (USAMGIK) occupied the southern half of the peninsula. A shanty town formed next to a nearby American military base. Residents provided a diverse array of legitimate and illegitimate services to the American soldiers, including namely alcohol and prostitution. According to one article, the name came about because of comparisons between the area to the Wild West, where bars would occupy the first floor of buildings, and prostitutes would work on the second floor.

Minors were banned from entering the area; this ban remained in effect for decades afterwards. Koreans were banned from entering the clubs and bars on the street. Koreans feared the area and considered it unsafe due to the drunken antics of soldiers. After the 1953 Busan Station Fire in the area, businesses moved closer to the Busan station area, where the district now remains.

=== Post-U.S. era ===
The area gradually lost its association with American servicemen beginning in the late 1980s, as the number of troops stationed in Busan began to decrease. Streets became virtually deserted, with many businesses closing.

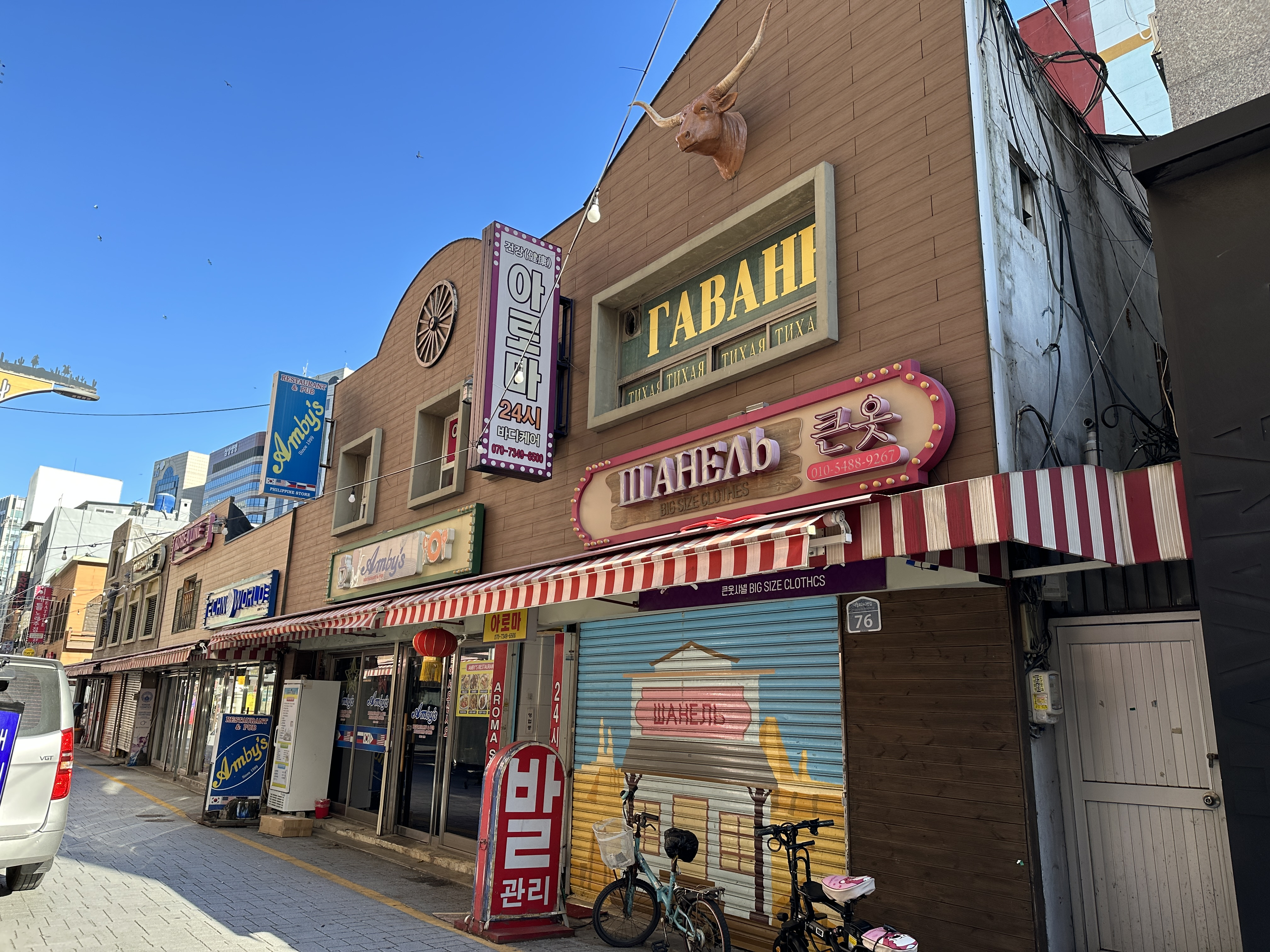
Old West decorations next to signs in Russian (2023)

The Soviet Union collapsed in 1991. In 1993, South Korea and Russia established diplomatic relations. The area then began catering to significant numbers of Russian sailors that moved between Vladivostok and Busan. Russian dancers and Filipina singers came to the area on work visas, although they were often forced into providing prostitution services. In 2003, work visas for Russian dancers ceased to be issued, although it was reported that many bar hostesses were Russian even in 2006. In the 2010s, an investigation into the forced prostitution of Filipinas in this area and several others led to an investigation by the International Crime Investigation Unit of the South Korean police.

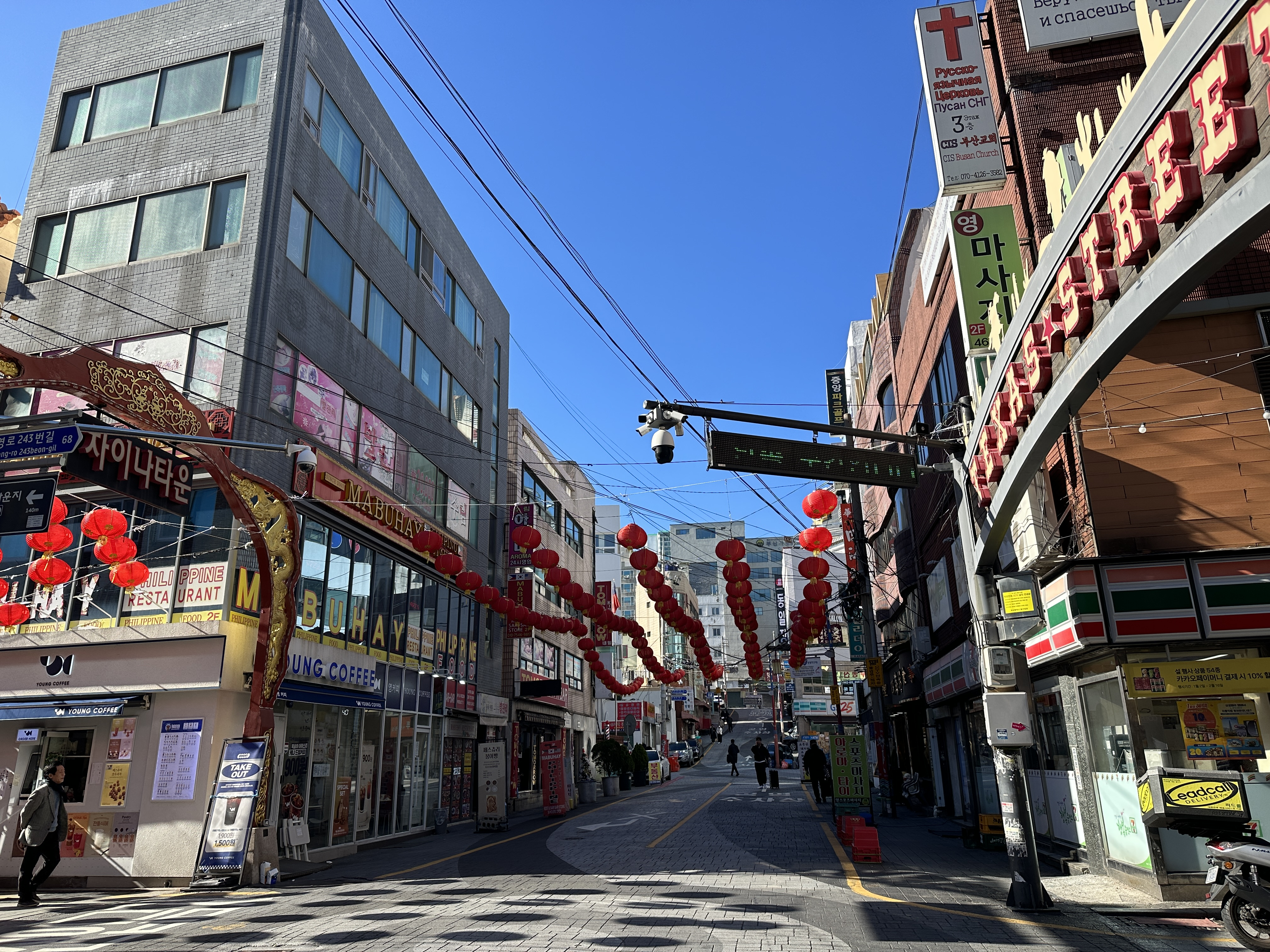
The Chinatown gate (left) and south Texas Street gate (right), directly across from each other. (2023)

In addition, South Korea and the People's Republic of China established diplomatic relations in late 1992, and Busan and Shanghai were made sister cities the following year. As such, efforts were made to revive parts of the district's former Chinese character. In 1999, the Shanghai Theme Street was built, with a Chinese-style gate, a Chinese-style community center, and other art projects. In 2007, this area was designated the Dong District Chinatown Special Zone, with further renovations planned.

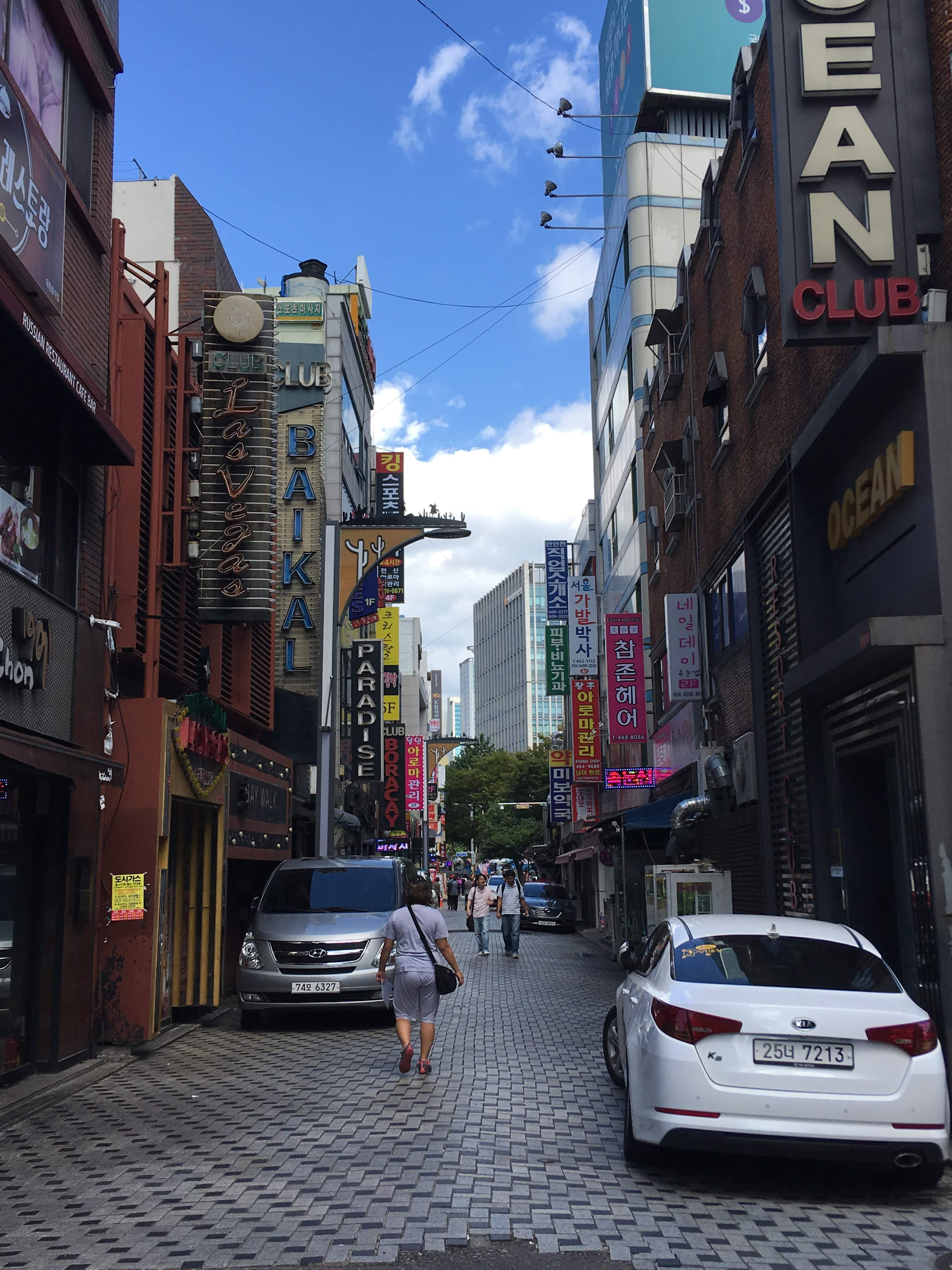
Part of the street in 2018, showing a mix of regular businesses and clubs. "Baikal" refers to Lake Baikal in Russia

Beginning in 1993, the character of the area became less catered towards bars and drinking, and more towards regular stores. The OhmyNews reporter felt that, in general, the Russian patrons were better behaved than the American ones, who he felt acted arrogantly because they viewed themselves as protectors of South Korea. However, business was slower than it had been when American soldiers frequented the area, as the Russians tended to have and spend less money. Regardless, the area became host to an ethnic enclave of Russians by 1999, with about 200 Russians living there year-round, and hundreds more on short-term visas.

=== Continued change to legitimate businesses ===
The city has since made a number of efforts to change the character of the area. One such effort was around the 2002 FIFA World Cup, which was hosted in South Korea and Japan. By the 2010s, the city invested more and more money into making the district a more general tourist area, and general patronage by Korean customers increased. The area had legitimate customers by day, but nightclub-goers by night.

However, these efforts have been considered to have had mixed results, as the area is still known for its prostitution and bars.

The area has retained some of its Russian character, particularly through a population of Koryo-saram: ethnic Koreans from the former Soviet Union. A community center for Russian speakers that offers various services is now in the area.

According to a 2018 document, the area is off limits for the Navy and Marines of the United States Forces Korea.
