= Eastern Avenue =

Eastern Avenue may refer to:

- Eastern Avenue (Baltimore)
- Eastern Avenue (Las Vegas)
- Eastern Avenue, London
- Eastern Avenue in Cardiff, part of the A48 road
- Eastern Avenue (Toronto), an east–west street in Toronto, Ontario, Canada
- Eastern Avenue (Washington, D.C.), one of three boundary streets between Washington, D.C., and the state of Maryland
- Eastern Avenue (film), a 1985 experimental documentary film directed by Peter Mettler

== See also ==
- 東區 (disambiguation)
- Eastern (disambiguation)
