= Falcon Inn, Ipswich =

Pub in Ipswich, Suffolk, England

Coordinates: 52°03′22″N 1°09′10″E

The Falcon Inn is a public house located at the junction of Queen Street and Falcon Street in Ipswich Suffolk. Located at 1 Falcon street it was owned by the Falcon Brewery located next door at 5 Falcon Street.

References to the Falcon go back to August 1728, when the Ipswich Journal announced a shooting competition at "the sign of the Falcon" in St. Nicholas Parish, Ipswich.

During the eighteenth century, a man by the name of John Curtis ran the pub, moving to the Falcon Inn from fellow Ipswich pub the Cock and Pye, Ipswich in 1743. Curtis died in 1744, at which point a man called John Osborn took over.

From at least 1816, the Inn was owned by a succession of three separate people all named Robert Bowman. By 1855, Alfred Bowman was in charge and sold the business through auction in that year. By 1865, the Falcon was owned by Bridges and Cuthbert, who established a holding company which also acquired the Cross Keys Brewery, on Culver St, in Colchester, before ultimately going bankrupt in 1868.

The pubcpassed into the hands of the Norfolk & Suffolk Brewery Co., Ltd in 1886. Norfolk & Suffolk was renamed the Colchester Brewing Company the following year, at which time the Falcon Brewery, the brewhouse at the Inn, was closed.

Upon closure of the brewery, the pub began selling Ind Coope products and was commercially run by the pubs' group Punch.

In 2010, the Falcon Inn rebranded and became known as "Bowmans Bar and Lounge". This iteration of the public house closed due to bankruptcy in 2017.

The pub reopened in 2018, once again under the Falcon Inn name.

Historically, the pub featured an attached music hall, where the Ipswich Industrial Co-operative Society was founded on 3 March 1868.
