= Southern Region =

Southern Region or South Region may refer to:

- Southern Nigeria (disambiguation)
- Southern Region (Boy Scouts of America)
- Southern Region, Bauchi, Nigeria
- South Region, Brazil, an official grouping of states for economic and statistical purposes
- Southern Region (Eritrea)
- Southern Region (Iceland)
- Southern Region, Ireland, statistical region
- Southern Region, Malawi
- Southern Region, Malta
- Southern Region, Serbia
- Southern Region of British Railways
- Southern Thailand, Thailand
- South Region (Cameroon)

== See also ==
- Southern Chile (wine region)
- Central Region (disambiguation)
- Eastern Region (disambiguation)
- Northern Region (disambiguation)
- Western Region (disambiguation)
