= Ipswich Industrial Co-operative Society =

Former consumer co-operative in Ipswich, England

The Ipswich Industrial Co-operative Society (IICS) was a co-operative society established in Ipswich, Suffolk on 3 March 1868. Although it merged with the Norwich Co-operative Society, formed in 1858, the ongoing organisation retained the registration details of the IICS. This was also retained when the subsequent Ipswich and Norwich Co-operative Society merged with the Colchester and East Essex Co-operative Society 2005 to form the East of England Co-operative Society (EECS). Thus the EECS celebrated its 150 birthday in 2018.

== Foundation ==
Attempts had been previously made to found a co-operative society in Ipswich in the 1840s and again in 1858, which lasted for five years before collapsing. However, in 1867 George Hines organised a meeting in the music hall of the Falcon Inn, Ipswich where D. P. Foxwell, gave a lecture on co-operation. Hines and Joseph Goody also spoke and by the end of the meeting about 20 people expressed their interest in forming a co-operative society. Following this Hines organised a public meeting on 5 November in Pearce's Rooms, Princes Street aimed particularly at workingmen. About 100 attended and after a number of speeches it was resolved to establish a co-operative with a provisional committee consisting of Hines and Goody and six others, with a further 27 members enrolled.
