= Western Region =

Western Region or West Region may refer to:

== Places ==
- Al Gharbia, Abu Dhabi, the Western Region
- Western Region, Bahrain
- Western Region, Eastern Cape, South Africa
- Western Region, Ghana
- Western Region (Iceland)
- Western Region, Nepal
- Western Region, Nigeria (former)
- Western Region, Serbia
- Western Region, Uganda
- Western Regions, a historic name for central Asia
- West Region, Cameroon
- West Region, Ireland
- West Region, Singapore
- Western Krai of the former Russian Empire
- West Bengal, a state in eastern India, the western part of the Bengal region

== Other ==
- Western Region (Boy Scouts of America), one of the large geographic divisions of the Boy Scouts of America
- Western Region of British Railways
- Western Region Football League, an Australian rules football semi-professional league

== See also ==
- Central Region (disambiguation)
- Eastern Region (disambiguation)
- Northern Region (disambiguation)
- Southern Region (disambiguation)
