= Eastern Parkway (disambiguation) =

Eastern Parkway is a parkway in Brooklyn, New York.

Eastern Parkway may also refer to:

- Eastern Parkway (Louisville, Kentucky)
- Subway infrastructure on Eastern Parkway in Brooklyn, New York:
  - Eastern Parkway station (BMT Fulton Street Line)
  - Eastern Parkway station (BMT Jamaica Line)
  - Eastern Parkway–Brooklyn Museum station (IRT Eastern Parkway Line)
  - IRT Eastern Parkway Line
- Eastern Parkway, an Anniston bypass of Alabama State Route 202
- Eastern Parkway, an extension of the Monaro Highway in Canberra, Australia

== See also ==
- Boxing from Eastern Parkway
- Charles River Reservation Parkways in Boston's Charles River Reservation
