= Eastern College =

Eastern College may refer to:

- Cebu Eastern College in Cebu City, Philippines
- Eastern College (Atlantic Canada) in Atlantic Canada, former CompuCollege
- Eastern College Australia in Melbourne, Australia
- Eastern College (Virginia), a defunct college in Front Royal and Manassas, Virginia
- College of the North Atlantic, formerly Eastern College, in Stephenville, Newfoundland and Labrador, Canada
- Eastern Goldfields College in Kalgoorlie, Australia
- Eastern Arizona College in Thatcher, Arizona, USA
- Eastern Gateway Community College in Jefferson County, Ohio
- College of Eastern Idaho in Idaho Falls, Idaho
- Eastern Iowa Community College District in Clinton, Bettendorf, and Muscatine, Iowa
- Eastern Nazarene College in Quincy, Massachusetts
- Eastern Oklahoma State College in Wilburton, Oklahoma
- Eastern Oregon University in La Grande, Oregon
- Eastern Shore Community College in Melfa, Virginia
- Eastern University (United States), formerly Eastern College, in St. David's, Pennsylvania
- Eastern West Virginia Community and Technical College in Moorefield, West Virginia
- Illinois Eastern Community Colleges in Olney, Illinois
- Montana State University Billings, formerly Eastern Montana College, in Billings, Montana
- University of Baltimore, which absorbed a defunct Eastern College, in Baltimore, Maryland

== See also ==
- Eastern University (disambiguation)
- Eastern College Athletic Conference
- Eastern Colleges Science Conference
