= Eastern Province =

Eastern Province and East Province may refer to the following places:

- Eastern Province, Afghanistan
- Eastern Province, Cameroon
- Eastern Province, Cundinamarca, Colombia
- Eastern Province, Rwanda
- Eastern Province (Kenya)
- Eastern Province (Saudi Arabia)
- Eastern Province, Sierra Leone
- Eastern Cape, South Africa
  - Eastern Province cricket team
- Eastern Province, Sri Lanka
- Eastern Province, Zambia
- Eastern Province (Victoria), a former electorate in the Victorian Legislative Council (Australia)
- Khorasan (Eastern Province of Iran)
- Roman and Byzantine Greece Greece as an eastern province of Roman Empire
- Purvanchal (lit. 'eastern province/region'), a region of India

== See also ==
- Eastern Region (disambiguation)
