= Eastern University =

Eastern University may refer to:

- Eastern University (Bangladesh) in Dhaka, Bangladesh
- Eastern University (United States) in St. Davids, Pennsylvania, US
- Eastern University of Sri Lanka in Batticaloa, Sri Lanka
- Universidad del Este (Puerto Rico), Eastern University

== See also ==
- Eastern College (disambiguation)
- Eastern Connecticut State University in Willimantic, Connecticut
- Eastern Illinois University in Charleston, Illinois
- Eastern Kentucky University in Richmond, Kentucky
- Eastern Mennonite University in Harrisonburg, Virginia
- Eastern Michigan University in Ypsilanti, Michigan
- Eastern New Mexico University in Portales, New Mexico
- Eastern Oregon University in La Grande, Oregon
- Eastern Washington University in Cheney, Washington
- Texas Eastern University, now the University of Texas at Tyler
- Eastern Mediterranean University in Famagusta, Cyprus
- Naples Eastern University in Naples, Italy
- Eastern Samar State University in Borongan, Eastern Samar, Philippines
- University of the East, Manila, Philippines
- Far Eastern University in Manila, Philippines
- Far Eastern Federal University in Vladivostok, Russia
- Far East University (disambiguation)
- Middle East University (disambiguation)
