= Eastern District =

Eastern District may refer to:

== Government ==
- Eastern District, Hong Kong
- Eastern District of Taipei
- Eastern District, American Samoa
- Eastern District, Upper Canada
- Eastern District (General Junta of Asturias constituency), Spain
- Eastern District, the early name for Williamsburg, Brooklyn
- Multiple United States district courts:
  - United States District Court for the Eastern District of Arkansas
  - United States District Court for the Eastern District of California
  - United States District Court for the Eastern District of Kentucky
  - United States District Court for the Eastern District of Louisiana
  - United States District Court for the Eastern District of Michigan
  - United States District Court for the Eastern District of Oklahoma
  - United States District Court for the Eastern District of Pennsylvania
  - United States District Court for the Eastern District of New York
  - United States District Court for the Eastern District of North Carolina
  - United States District Court for the Eastern District of Tennessee
  - United States District Court for the Eastern District of Texas
  - United States District Court for the Eastern District of Virginia
  - United States District Court for the Eastern District of Washington
  - United States District Court for the Eastern District of Wisconsin

== Military ==
- Eastern Command (United Kingdom), an organisational unit of the British Army in England 1793–1968
- Eastern District (British Army), a district command of the British Army 1967–1995

== Other uses ==
- Eastern District (LCMS), in the Lutheran Church–Missouri Synod
- Eastern District (VHSL), in the Virginia High School League

== See also ==
- East District (disambiguation)
- For Eastern Districts in East Asian languages, see 東區 (disambiguation)
- For Eastern Districts (ku) in Japanese cities, see Higashi-ku (disambiguation)
- For Eastern Districts (gu) in Korean cities, see Dong-gu (disambiguation)
