= Eastern Savings and Loans =

Credit union in the United Kingdom

- Founded: 2001 (North Cambridge 1998)
- Type: Industrial and Provident Society
- Location: 61–63 Austin Street, Ipswich, Suffolk IP2 8DF
- Website: eslcu.co.uk

Eastern Savings and Loans Credit Union Limited is a not-for-profit member-owned financial co-operative, based in Ipswich and operating through 25 local payment and information points in the East Anglian counties of Suffolk, Cambridgeshire, Norfolk and north Essex. The credit union has 6,500 members and manages £1.4 million in savings.

== History ==
Eastern Savings and Loans traces its origins to the foundation of the Ipswich Credit Union in 2001, which became Ipswich and Suffolk Credit Union in 2005. South Norfolk Credit Union was formed in Norwich in 2002, becoming Norfolk Credit Union in 2007. The directors of both these credit unions agreed a merger in 2014, adopting the present name.

Rainbow Saver Anglia Credit Union, formed in Lowestoft in 1999, was included in merger discussions and joint meetings of all three credit unions showed a similar ethos and statistics. The merger with Rainbow Saver Anglia was expected to proceed at a later date, but it ceased trading in 2022.

The smaller North Cambridge Credit Union was formed in 1998, becoming the Cambridge City Credit Union in 2005; its 161 members voted to transfer engagements to Eastern Savings and Loans in 2015.

Year	Proposed Dividend
2017	0%
2018	0% (2% interest on Junior accounts)
2019	0% (2% interest on Junior accounts)
2020	0.25% (2% interest on Junior accounts), proposal withdrawn in light of pandemic.
2021	0% (1% interest on Junior accounts)
2022	0.15% (1% interest on Junior accounts)

== Activities ==
The credit union operates for the purpose of promoting thrift, providing credit and other financial services to its members at reasonable rates.

Membership of Eastern Savings and Loans is restricted by common bond to individuals living, working, studying or volunteering inside the boundaries of Suffolk, Cambridgeshire and Norfolk. Tenants of a number of housing associations, students enrolled at the British Racing School, Northern Racing College, Racing Welfare or The National Stud, employees of the East of England Co-operative Society and individuals related to and living in the same household as a member are also eligible to join. In 2022, it expanded to include north Essex in its common bond area.

In 2014, the credit union was awarded a grant of £100,000 by the Lloyds Banking Group Credit Union Development Fund to help support its reserves and facilitate mergers with neighbouring credit unions.

=== Products ===
Eastern Savings and Loans runs a payroll deduction savings and loans scheme in conjunction with the East of England Co-operative Society, Ipswich Buses and a number of local authorities. The credit union is responsible for the operation of the scheme, with the employer facilitating monthly deductions from salary. A payment card, accepted at Post Office and PayPoint outlets, is also issued to members on request.

As is common with credit unions, Eastern Savings and Loans doesn't pay a fixed rate of interest on savings balances; instead, the organization distributes its trading surplus to members in the form of an annual dividend calculated on average savings or as a rebate of loan interest paid.

The credit union offers business, third sector and corporate deposit accounts to organisations based in the area covered by the membership requirements. The Change Account card, issued on behalf of Eastern Savings and Loans, functions in a similar way to a High Street bank account.

Eastern Savings and Loans is a member of the Association of British Credit Unions Limited, registered under the Credit Union Act 1979 and the Co-operative and Community Benefit Societies Act 2014, and is authorised by the Prudential Regulation Authority and regulated by the Financial Conduct Authority and PRA. As with banks and building societies, members' savings are protected against business failure by the Financial Services Compensation Scheme.

== See also ==
- Credit unions in the United Kingdom
- East of England Co-operative Society
