= Central Region =

Central Region, Center Region, Centrale Region, or Centre Region can refer to:

== Africa ==
- Centre Region, Burkina Faso, one of 13 administrative regions
- Centre Region, Cameroon, one of ten semi-autonomous regions
- Maekel Region or Central Region, Eritrea, one of six regions
- Central Region, Ghana, one of sixteen regions
- Central Region, Malawi, one of three regions
- Central Region, Uganda, one of four regions into which the districts are grouped
- Central Regions State, Somalia
- Centrale Region, Togo, one of five regions
- Middle Belt, the central region of Nigeria.

== Americas ==
- AAA Central Region, a high school sports region in the U.S. state of Virginia
- Center Region, Argentina, one of several geographical regions
- Central Region, Venezuela
- Central Region (Boy Scouts of America)

== Asia ==
- Central Region, Nepal, one of five development regions
- Central Region, Singapore, one of five regions
- Central Region within the Yuan dynasty governed by the Zhongshu Sheng
- Madhyadesha (lit. 'middle country/land'), historical region of northern and central India
- Madhya Pradesh (lit. 'middle region'), a state in central India

== Europe ==
- Centre region, Hainaut, an informal region in the province of Hainaut, which is part of the region of Wallonia, Belgium
- Centre-Val de Loire, before 2015 Centre, France
- Central Region, Malta, one of five regions of Malta
- Central Region, Portugal, a region of Portugal
- Central Region, Scotland, one of nine former local government regions
- Central Region, Serbia, a former statistical region, now part of Šumadija and Western Serbia statistical region

== See also ==
- Eastern Region (disambiguation)
- Northern Region (disambiguation)
- Southern Region (disambiguation)
- Western Region (disambiguation)
