= Northern Region, Eastern Cape =

Region

The Northern Region is one of the four regions of Eastern Cape in South Africa.
