= Far East (disambiguation) =

Far East is a term often used by people in the Western world to refer to the countries of East and Southeast Asia. It may also refer to the following:

- Far East (film), a 1982 Australian drama film
- Far East (play), an A. R. Gurney play
  - Far East (2001 film), an American adaptation of the play directed by Daniel J. Sullivan
- Far East Broadcasting Company, an international Christian radio network
- Far East Network, a defunct network of US military stations in Asia
- The Far East (periodical), a newspaper published in Japan
- Russian Far East, a term that refers to the Russian part of the Far East
