= Eastern Region =

Eastern Region or East Region may refer to:

== Africa ==
- Eastern Region, Ghana
- Eastern Region, Nigeria
- Eastern Region, Uganda
- East Region (Cameroon)
- Est Region (Burkina Faso)

== Asia ==
- Eastern Region (Abu Dhabi): Al Ain
- Eastern Region, Nepal
- East Region, Singapore
- Purvanchal (lit. 'eastern region'), a region of India
- East Punjab (state), former state in northwestern India (1947–1966), the eastern part of the Punjab region
  - Punjab, India, a state of India divided from the above, sometimes still referred to as East Punjab

== United States ==
- AAA Eastern Region, a high school sports region of large high schools in the state of Virginia

== Europe ==
- Eastern Region (Iceland)
- Eastern Region, Malta
- Eastern Region, Serbia
- Eastern Region of British Railways
- Eastern Region Women's Football League, England
- Eastern Region (Northern Ireland football)

== See also ==
- Central Region (disambiguation)
- Eastern Province (disambiguation)
- Northern Region (disambiguation)
- Southern Region (disambiguation)
- Western Region (disambiguation)
