= Dong District, Busan =

District of Busan, South Korea

Coordinates: 35.1294°N 129.0455°E

Dong
- Autonomous District
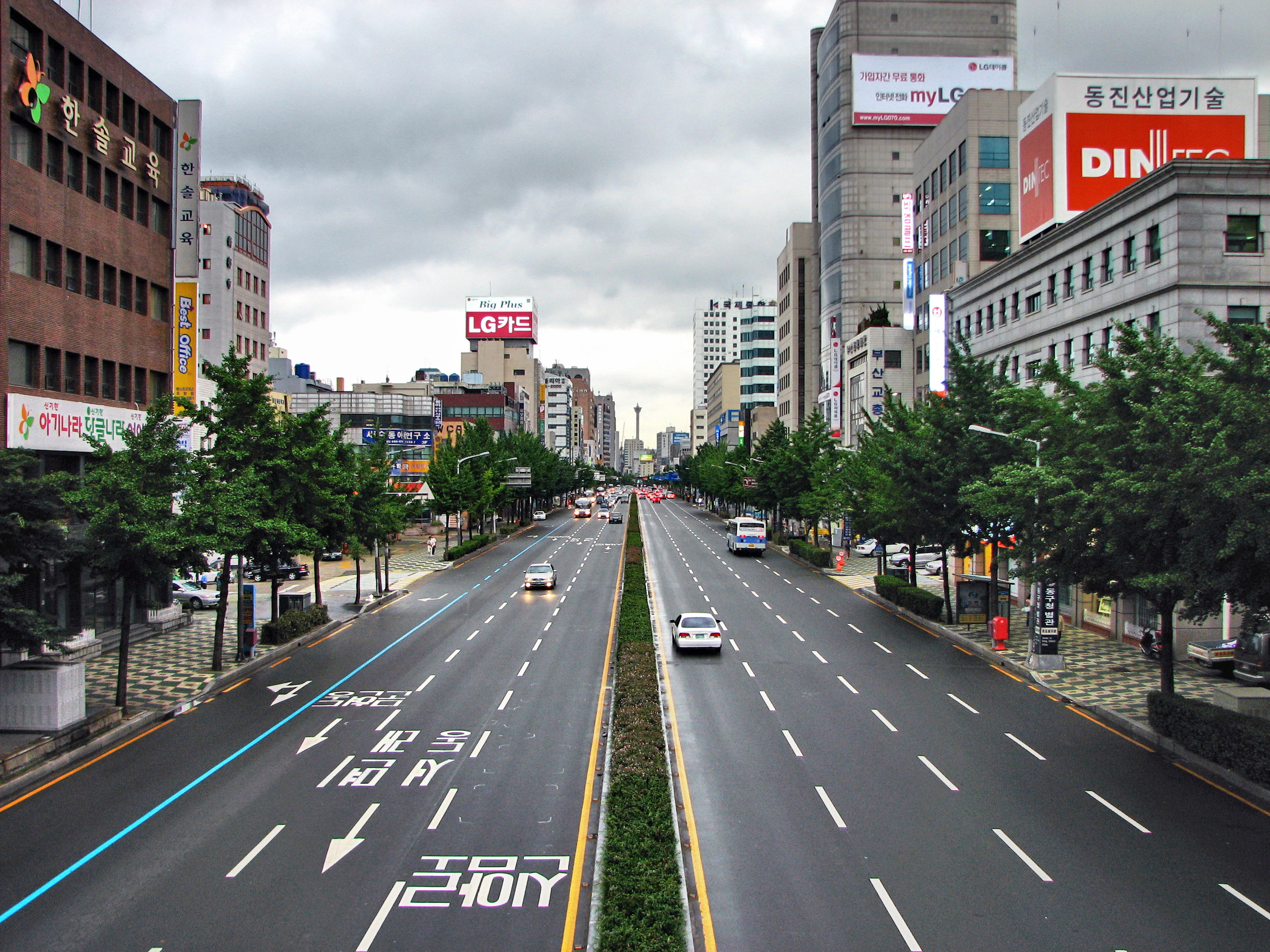

- Map of Busan
- Country: South Korea
- Region: Yeongnam
- Provincial level: Busan
- Administrative divisions: 12 administrative dong

Government
  - Mayor: Kang Chul-ho (강철호)

Area
  - Total: 10.12 km^{2} (3.91 sq mi)

Population (October 2026)
  - Total: 82,904
  - Dialect: Gyeongsang
- Website: Dong District Office

Korean name
- Hangul: 동구
- Hanja: 東區
- RR: Dong-gu
- MR: Tong-gu

Dong District (Korean: 동구) is a gu in Busan, South Korea. Its population is about 82,000 as of 2026. It serves as a transportation hub as Busan station and Busan Port are located there.

== History ==
The area belonged to the Byeonhan confederacy and was later incorporated to Silla. It belonged to Dongpyeong-hyeon during Unified Silla. It was under Yangsan during the Goryeo dynasty. During the Joseon dynasty, the area developed into a major center for diplomatic negotiations and trade with Japan. In 1407, a waegwan (Japanese trading settlement) was established near Busan Port (present-day Jwacheon-dong) but was closed after the Imjin War. In 1601, a temporary waegwan was established. After the opening of Busan Port in 1876, Western culture was introduced to the area.

The Japanese colonial authorities constructed Pier No. 3 in 1941, Pier No. 4 in 1943, and Central Pier in 1944. Following the liberation of Korea, the population of the area increased rapidly due to the return of overseas Koreans and the influx of refugees during the Korean War. In 1957, following the implementation of the district administrative system, the area was officially elevated to the status of Dong District.

== Administrative divisions ==
Administrative divisions

Dong District is divided into 4 legal dong (법정동), which altogether comprise 12 administrative dong (행정동).

Name	Area (km^{2})	Population (October 2026)
Choryang-1-dong	0.26	4,743
Choryang-2-dong	0.39	4,826
Choryang-3-dong	1.53	13,102
Choryang-6-dong	1.34	4,721
Sujeong-1-dong	0.22	3,927
Sujeong-2-dong	1.12	8,419
Sujeong-4-dong	0.92	3,184
Sujeong-5-dong	0.34	4,345
Jwacheon-dong	0.46	10,510
Beomil-1-dong	0.98	10,041
Beomil-2-dong	0.83	6,066
Beomil-5-dong	1.73	9,020
Total	10.12	82,904

== Population ==
The population of Dong District has decreased over the past three decades.

Year	Population
1995	155,320
2005	109,879
2015	92,069
2025	83,851

== Transportation ==
The district is a transportation hub as Busan station, Busanjin station, Busan Port, and Busan Port Passenger Terminal are located in the region.

== Education ==
As of 2015, there are eight elementary schools, six middle schools, and five high schools. Ilsin Girls' School (present-day Dongnae Girls' High School), established in 1895 in Jwacheon-dong by Australian missionaries, was the beginning of modern women's education in Busan. Foreign schools include Chinese Korea Busan School (kindergarten and elementary) and Overseas Chinese High School, Busan.

== Culture and tourism ==
=== Cultural properties ===
Seated Amitābha Triad of Bogwangsa

There are cultural properties related to Imjin War. Busanjinseong, a fortress built by the Japanese military in 1593, and Jeonggongdan, a shrine that honors general Jeong Bal who died during the war, are designated as Monuments of Busan.

There are several Buddhist temples in the district. The Seated Amitābha Triad of Bogwangsa, a sculpture created by the monk Saengnan who was active from late 17th century to early 18th century, is designated as a Tangible Cultural Heritage of Busan. The Seven Tathāgata Banners of Sorimsa, bestowed by the royal court of the Korean Empire, are designated as Folk Cultural Heritage of Busan.

There are modern buildings in the district. The building of Ilsin Girls' School, built in 1905, is designated as a Monument of Busan. Baekje Hospital, established in the 1920s, was Busan’s first modern private general hospital and is designated as National Registered Cultural Heritage.

=== Modern facilities ===
Busan Shanghai Street, the largest Chinese residential area in Busan, has Chinese restaurants and schools for Chinese children.

The 168 stairs in Choryang-dong, where Korean War refugees settled, has toy stores and a monorail nearby.

North Port Waterfront Park, which opened in 2021, gained nationwide attention when Bukangi appeared there in 2026.

== Nature ==
Geumjeongsan, Sujeongsan, Eomgwangsan and Gubongsan mountains are located in the northwestern part of the district, and the area borders the sea in the southeast. The coastline consisted of rocky shores, but these were reclaimed and are now used for urban districts, roads, and port facilities.

== Sister cities ==
- South Korea: Seongdong District, Gwangsan District, Uljin County, Hadong County
- China: Zhifu, Xuhui, Shaoxing
- Taiwan: Yancheng District

== Notable people ==
- Park Heong-joon (1960-), mayor of Busan (2021-2026)
- Jang Wooyoung (1989-), singer and member of 2PM

== Gallery ==
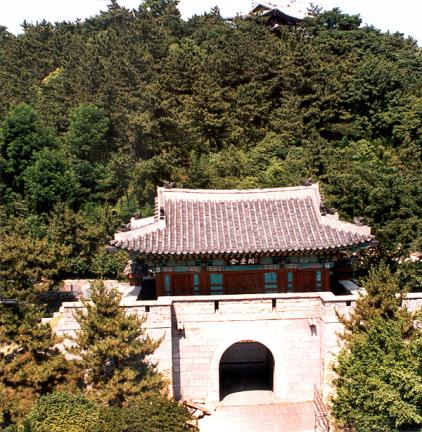
Busanjinseong

Jeonggongdan

Ilsin Girls' High School

Baekje Hospital

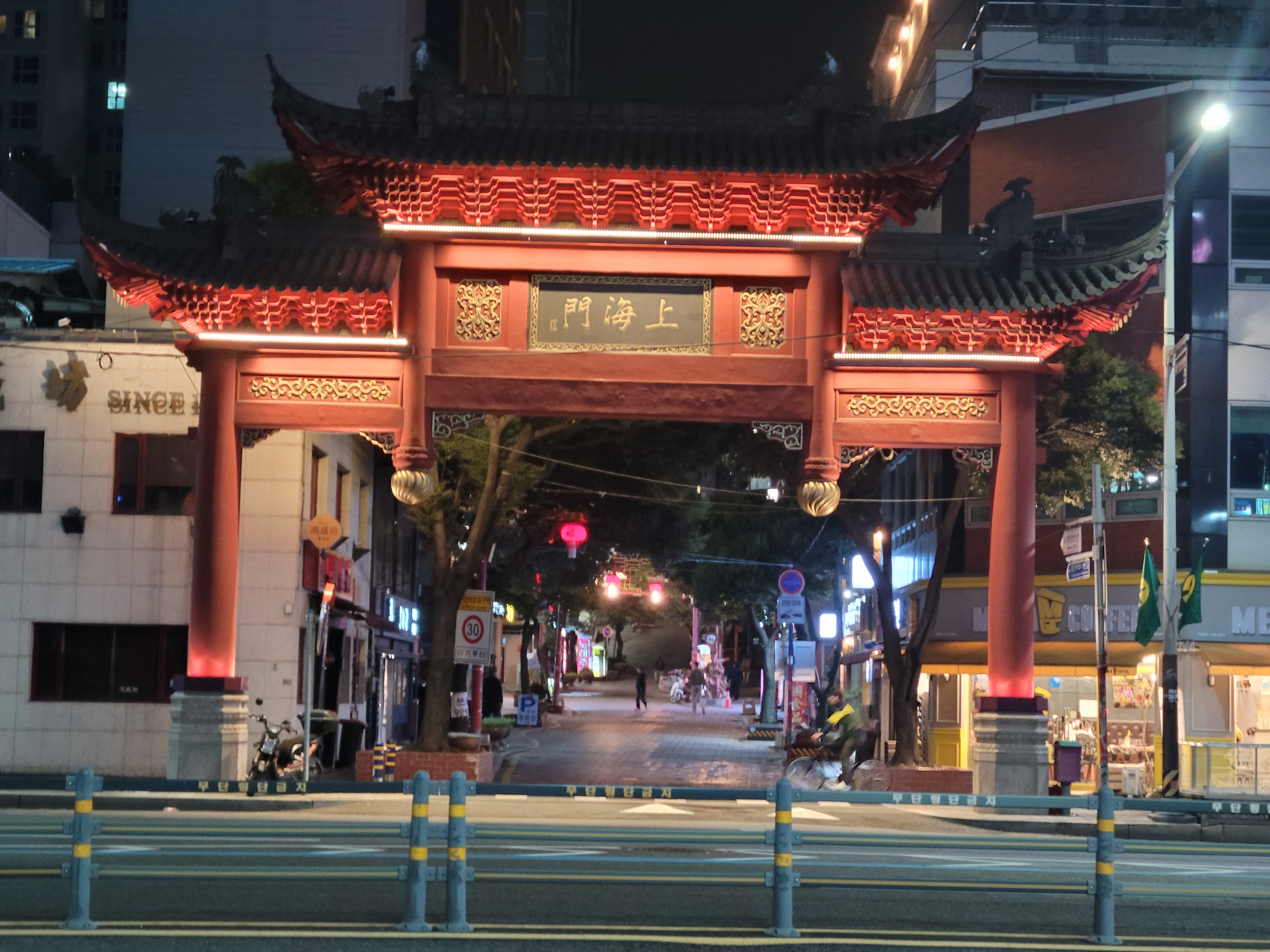
Busan Shanghai Street

168 stairs

North Port Waterfront Park
