= 1689 list of pubs in Ipswich =

The 1689 list of pubs in Ipswich was a seventeenth century list of inns and taverns in the Borough of Ipswich and surrounding areas. The list identified 24 pubs according to their parish. The largest number were to be found in the St Mary le Tower Parish. If the list was complete, this would indicate around one public house per 500 inhabitants.

| Image | Name of pub | Area | Location | Status | Notes |
|---|---|---|---|---|---|
| | The Griffen | St Mary-le-Tower | | | |
| | The Chequers | St Mary-le-Tower | | | |
| | The Swan | St Mary-le-Tower | | | |
| | The Kings Head | St Mary-le-Tower | | | |
| | The Castle | St Mary-le-Tower | | | |
| | The Queens Head | St Mary-le-Tower | | | |
| | The Three Cooneys | St Mary-le-Tower | | | |
| | The Royal Oak | St Mary-le-Tower | | | |
| | The White Horse | St Mary-le-Tower | | | |
| | The Black Boy | St Mary-le-Tower | | | |
| | The Coffee House | St Mary-le-Tower | | | |
| | The Greyhound | St Margaret | | | |
| | The Cock and Pye | St Margaret | | | |
| | The Two Necked Swan | St Margaret | | | |
| | The Buck | St Margaret | | | |
| | The Wool Pack | St Margaret | | | |
| | The Saracens Head | St Margaret | | | |
| | The Angel | St Mary The Quay | | | |
| | The Bull | St Mary The Quay | | | |
| | The Gun | St Peters | | | |
| | The Rose | St Peters | | | |
| | The Seven Stars | St Lawrence | | | |
| | The White Hart | St Lawrence | | | |
| | The Half Moon | St Nicholas | | | |
