= Korean Taiwanese =

Korean Taiwanese or Taiwanese Korean may refer to:

- Koreans in Taiwan
- Taiwanese people in South Korea
- Taiwanese people in North Korea
- South Korea–Taiwan relations
- North Korea–Taiwan relations
- Multiracial people of Korean and Taiwanese descent
