= Sino-Korean =

Sino-Korean may refer to:

- Sino-Korean vocabulary, Korean vocabulary composed of morphemes of Chinese origin
- People's Republic of China–North Korea relations
- People's Republic of China–South Korea relations
- Republic of China–South Korea relations
- Chinese people in Korea (also known as Hwagyo)
- Koreans in China (also known as Joseonjok or Chaoxianzu)
- Sino–Korean cuisine, a hybrid cuisine developed by Chinese and Koreans

== See also ==
- Chinese Korean (disambiguation)
- Sino-Korean relations (disambiguation)
- Chinese-language literature of Korea
- Chinese influence on Korean culture
