= Chinese South Korean =

Chinese South Korean or South Korean Chinese may refer to:

- China–South Korea relations
- South Korea–Taiwan relations
- Ethnic Chinese in South Korea
- South Koreans in China
- South Koreans in the Republic of China
- Multiracial people of Chinese and South Korean descent
