= List of diplomatic missions in South Korea =

This is a list of diplomatic missions in South Korea. There are currently 117 embassies and six Representative Offices in Seoul, and some countries maintain consulates (not including honorary consulates) in cities other than Seoul as well. Several other countries that have diplomatic ties with South Korea but do not operate embassies in Seoul maintain non-resident embassies, mostly in Tokyo, Beijing or elsewhere.

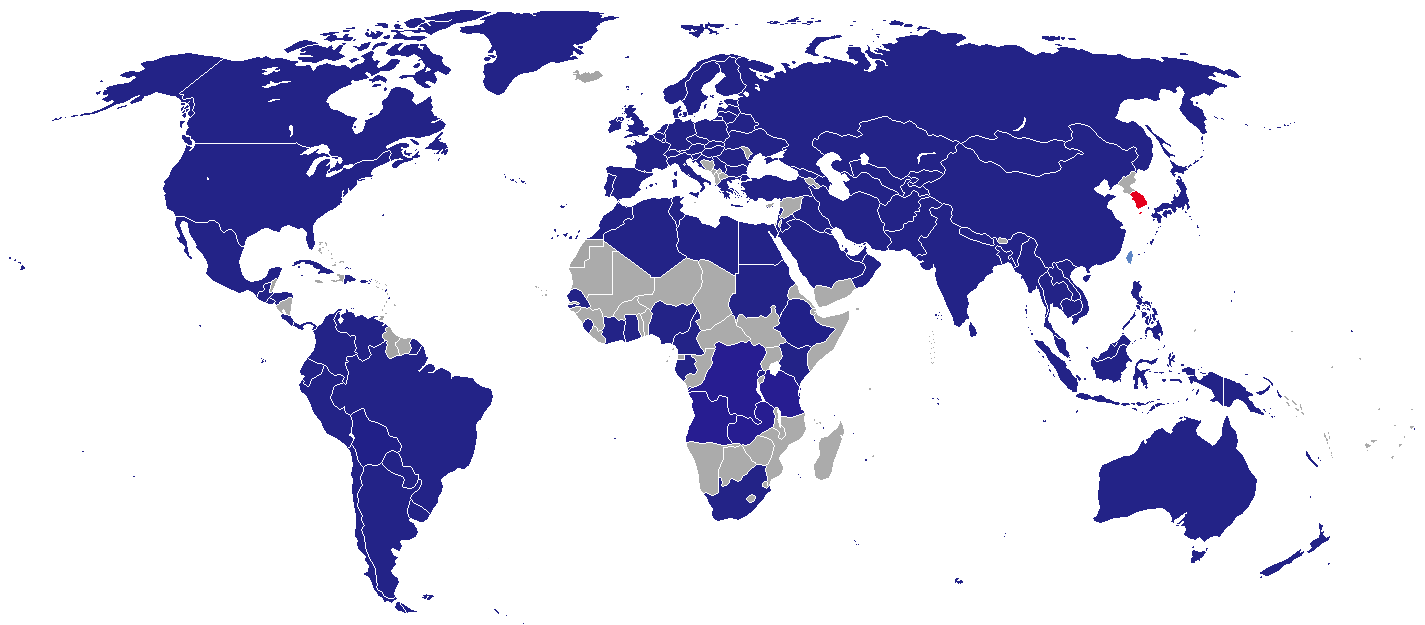
Map of diplomatic missions in the Republic of Korea

== Embassies in Seoul ==
1. Afghanistan
2. Algeria
3. Angola
4. Argentina
5. Australia
6. Austria
7. Azerbaijan
8. Bahrain
9. Bangladesh
10. Belgium
11. Belarus
12. Bolivia
13. Brazil
14. Brunei
15. Bulgaria
16. Cambodia
17. Canada
18. Chile
19. China
20. Colombia
21. Congo-Kinshasa
22. Costa Rica
23. Croatia
24. Cuba
25. Czech Republic
26. Denmark
27. Dominican Republic
28. Ecuador
29. Egypt
30. El Salvador
31. Estonia
32. Ethiopia
33. Finland
34. France
35. Gabon
36. Georgia
37. Germany
38. Ghana
39. Greece
40. Guatemala
41. Holy See
42. Honduras
43. Hungary
44. India
45. Indonesia
46. Iran
47. Iraq
48. Ireland
49. Israel
50. Italy
51. Ivory Coast
52. Japan
53. Jordan
54. Kazakhstan
55. Kenya
56. Kuwait
57. Kyrgyzstan
58. Laos
59. Latvia
60. Lebanon
61. Libya
62. Lithuania
63. Luxembourg
64. Malaysia
65. Marshall Islands
66. Mauritania
67. Mexico
68. Mongolia
69. Morocco
70. Myanmar
71. Nepal
72. Netherlands
73. New Zealand
74. Nigeria
75. Norway
76. Oman
77. Pakistan
78. Panama
79. Papua New Guinea
80. Paraguay
81. Peru
82. Philippines
83. Poland
84. Portugal
85. Qatar
86. Romania
87. Russia
88. Rwanda
89. Saudi Arabia
90. Senegal
91. Serbia
92. Sierra Leone
93. Singapore
94. Slovakia
95. Slovenia
96. South Africa
97. Spain
98. Sri Lanka
99. Sudan
100. Sweden
101. Switzerland
102. Tajikistan
103. Tanzania
104. Thailand
105. Timor-Leste
106. Tunisia
107. Turkey
108. Turkmenistan
109. Ukraine
110. United Arab Emirates
111. United Kingdom
112. United States
113. Uruguay
114. Uzbekistan
115. Venezuela
116. Vietnam
117. Zambia

== Representative Offices in Seoul ==
1. Catalonia (Delegation)
2. European Union (Delegation)
3. Hong Kong (Economic & Trade Office's Consultant Office)
4. National Unity Government of Myanmar (Representative Office)
5. Quebec (Quebec Government Office)
6. Republic of China (Taiwan) (Mission)

== Consular missions ==
The following cities are host to career consular missions. All are consulates-general unless otherwise indicated.

=== Busan ===
1. China
2. Japan
3. Kazakhstan
4. Mongolia (Consulate)
5. Philippines
6. Russia
7. Republic of China (Taiwan) (Office)
8. United States (Consulate)
9. Vietnam

=== Gwangju ===
1. China

=== Jeju City ===
1. China
2. Japan

== Non-resident embassies accredited to South Korea ==
Resident in Tokyo, Japan:

- Albania
- Armenia
- Benin
- Bosnia and Herzegovina
- Botswana
- Burkina Faso
- Cameroon
- Djibouti
- Eritrea
- Fiji
- Guinea
- Haiti
- Iceland
- Jamaica
- Kosovo
- Lesotho
- Liberia
- Madagascar
- Malawi
- Maldives
- Mali
- Moldova
- Mozambique
- Namibia
- North Macedonia
- Palau
- Syria
- Togo
- Uganda
- Yemen
- Zimbabwe

Resident in Beijing, China:

- Bahamas
- Barbados
- Burundi
- Cape Verde
- Chad
- Congo-Brazzaville
- Cyprus
- Equatorial Guinea
- Gambia
- Guinea-Bissau
- Guyana
- Malta
- Mauritius
- Montenegro
- Samoa
- Seychelles
- South Sudan
- Suriname
- Trinidad and Tobago

Resident in other cities:

- Bhutan (Dhaka)
- Central African Republic (Bangui)
- Eswatini (Kuala Lumpur)
- Kiribati (Suva)
- Nicaragua (New York City)
- Niger (Washington, D.C.)
- Saint Kitts and Nevis (Basseterre)
- São Tomé and Príncipe (São Tomé)
- Somalia (Jakarta)
- Tuvalu (Suva)

== Former missions ==
Host city	Sending country	Mission	Year closed	Ref.
Kaesong	North Korea	Inter-Korean Liaison Office	2020	
Seoul	Eswatini	Embassy	1999	
Seoul	Fiji	Embassy	2020	
Seoul	Haiti	Embassy	1992	
Seoul	Khmer Republic	Embassy	1975	
Seoul	Nicaragua	Embassy	2024	
Seoul	Republic of China (Taiwan)	Embassy	1992	
Seoul	South Vietnam	Embassy	1975	
Seoul	Yemen	Embassy	2001	

== Missions to open ==
Host city	Sending country	Mission	Ref.
Seoul	Cameroon	Embassy	
Seoul	Fiji	Embassy	
Seoul	Mozambique	Embassy	
Seoul	Syria	Embassy	

== Gallery ==
Building hosting the embassies of Australia, Austria, Colombia, Finland and Lithuania

Building hosting the embassies of Bahrain, Denmark, Estonia and Germany and delegation of the European Union

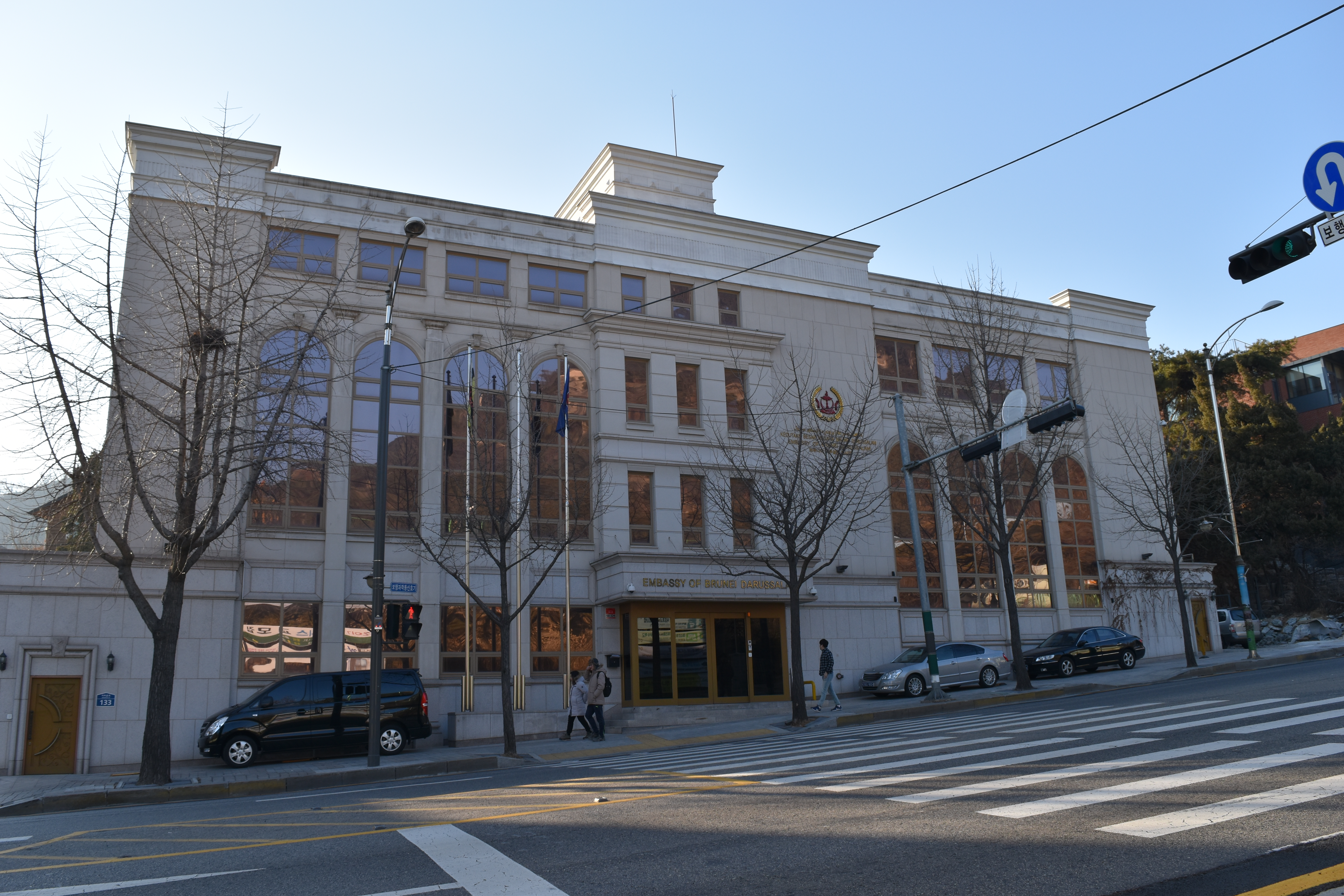
Embassy of Brunei Darussalam

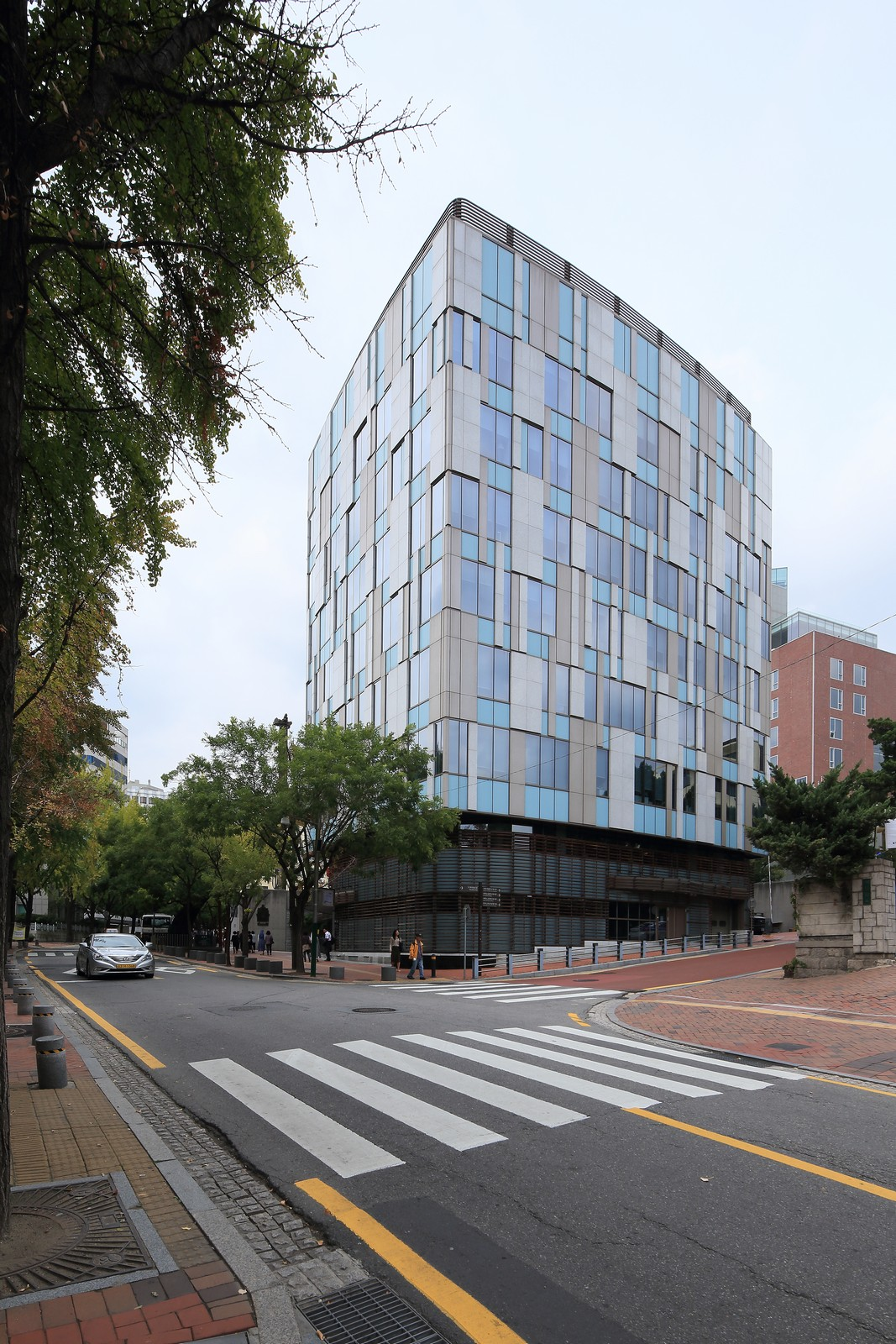
Building hosting the embassy of Canada

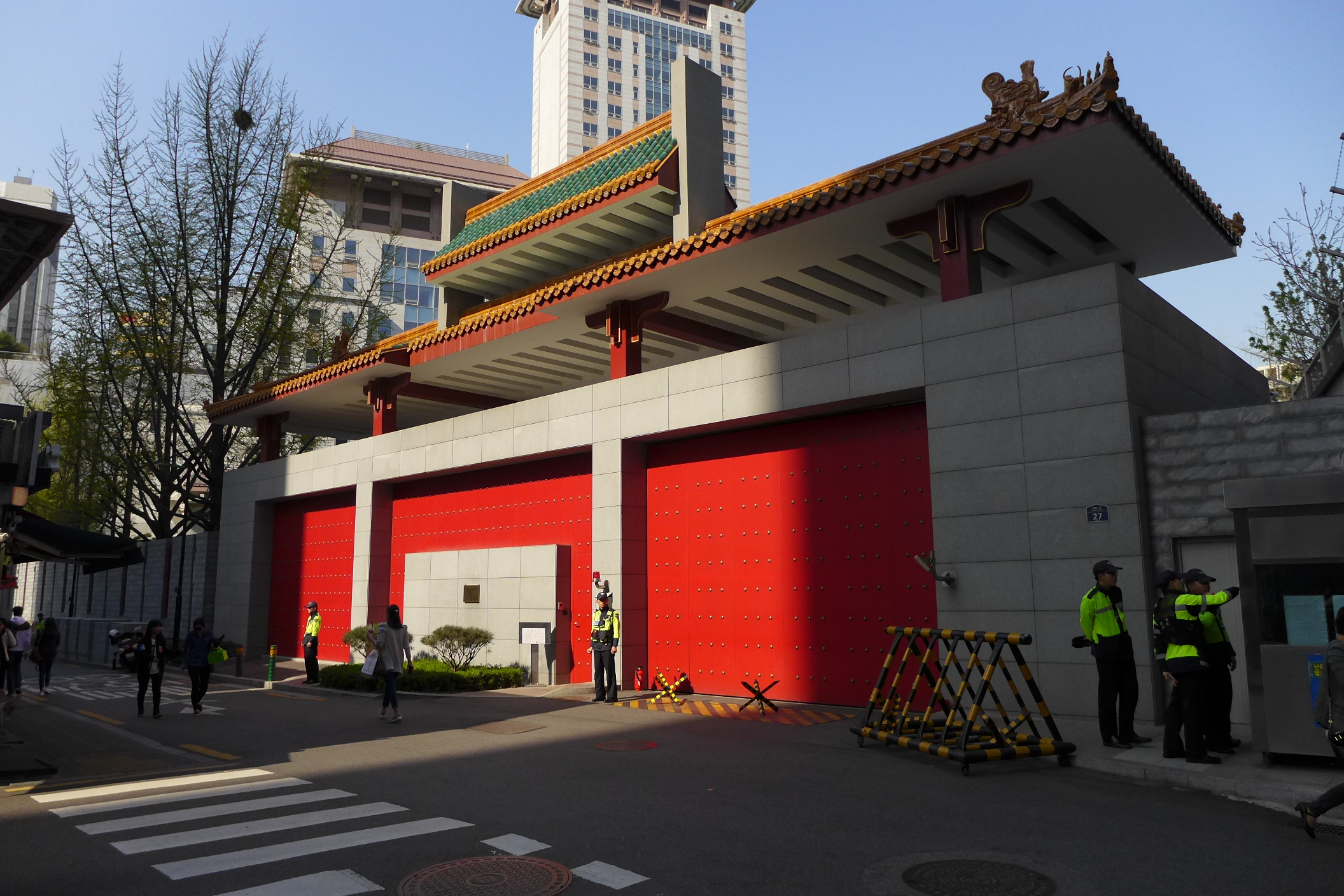
Embassy of China

Embassy of France

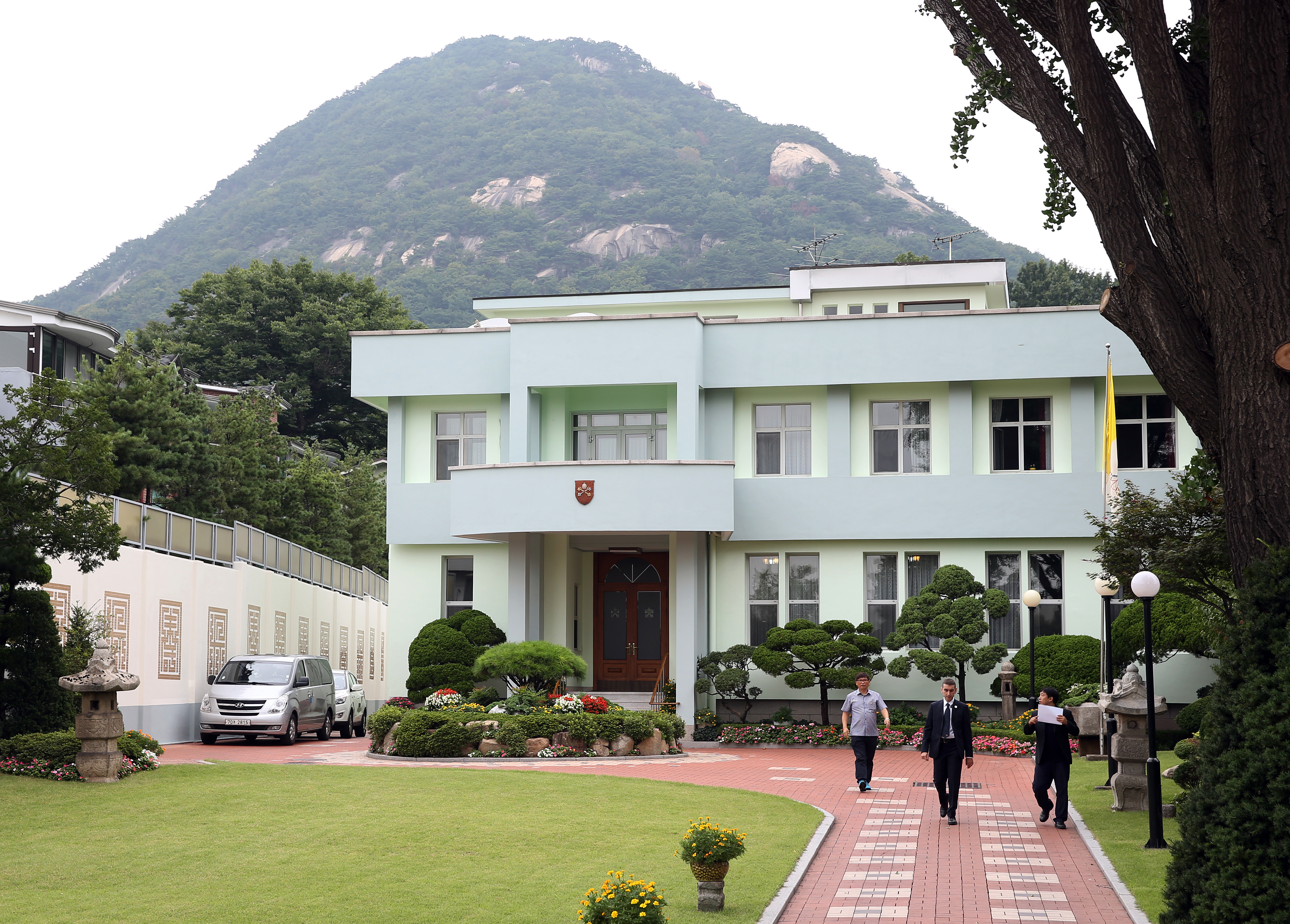
Embassy of the Holy See

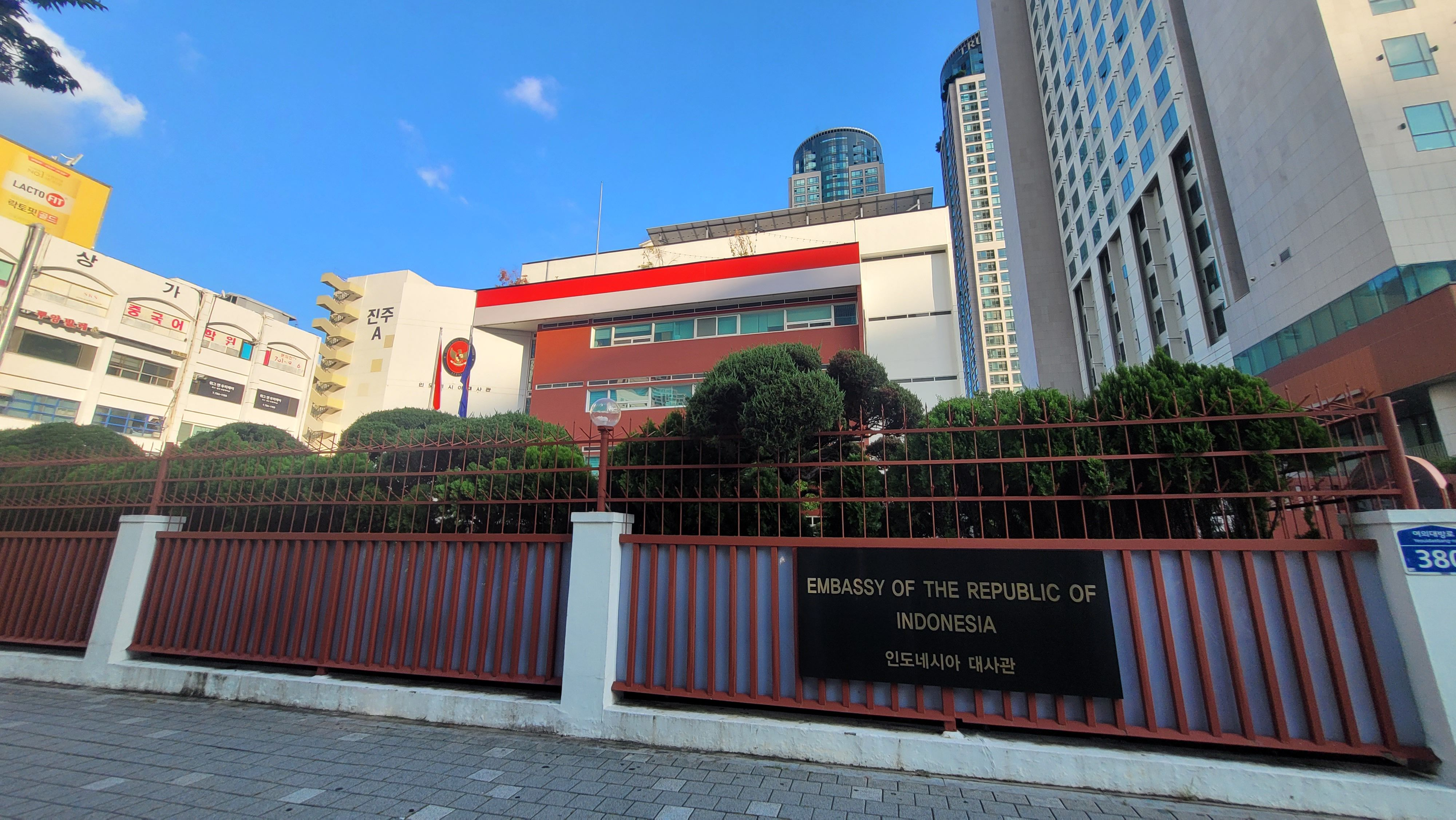
Embassy of Indonesia

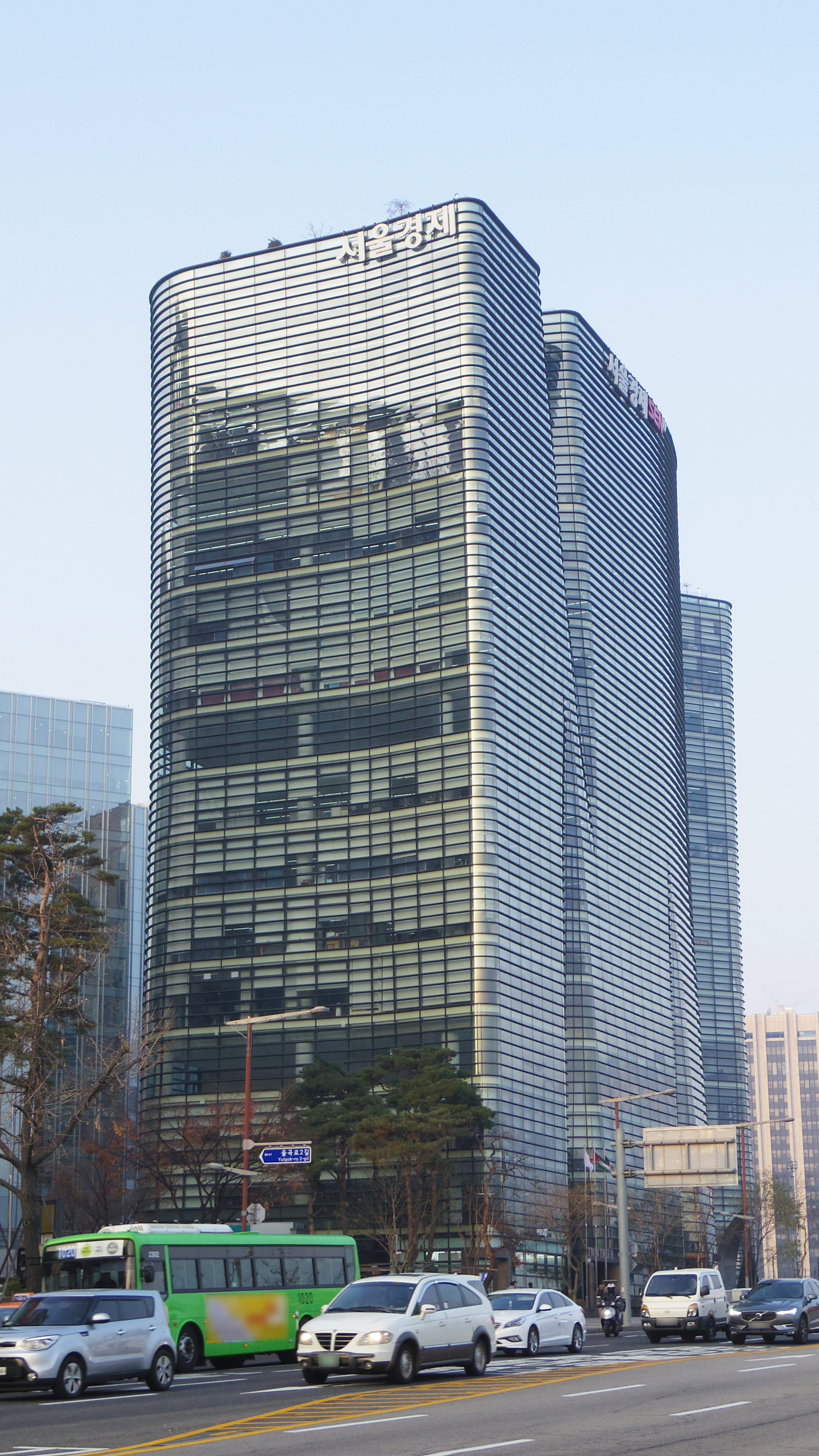
Building hosting the embassies of Japan, Jordan and Mexico

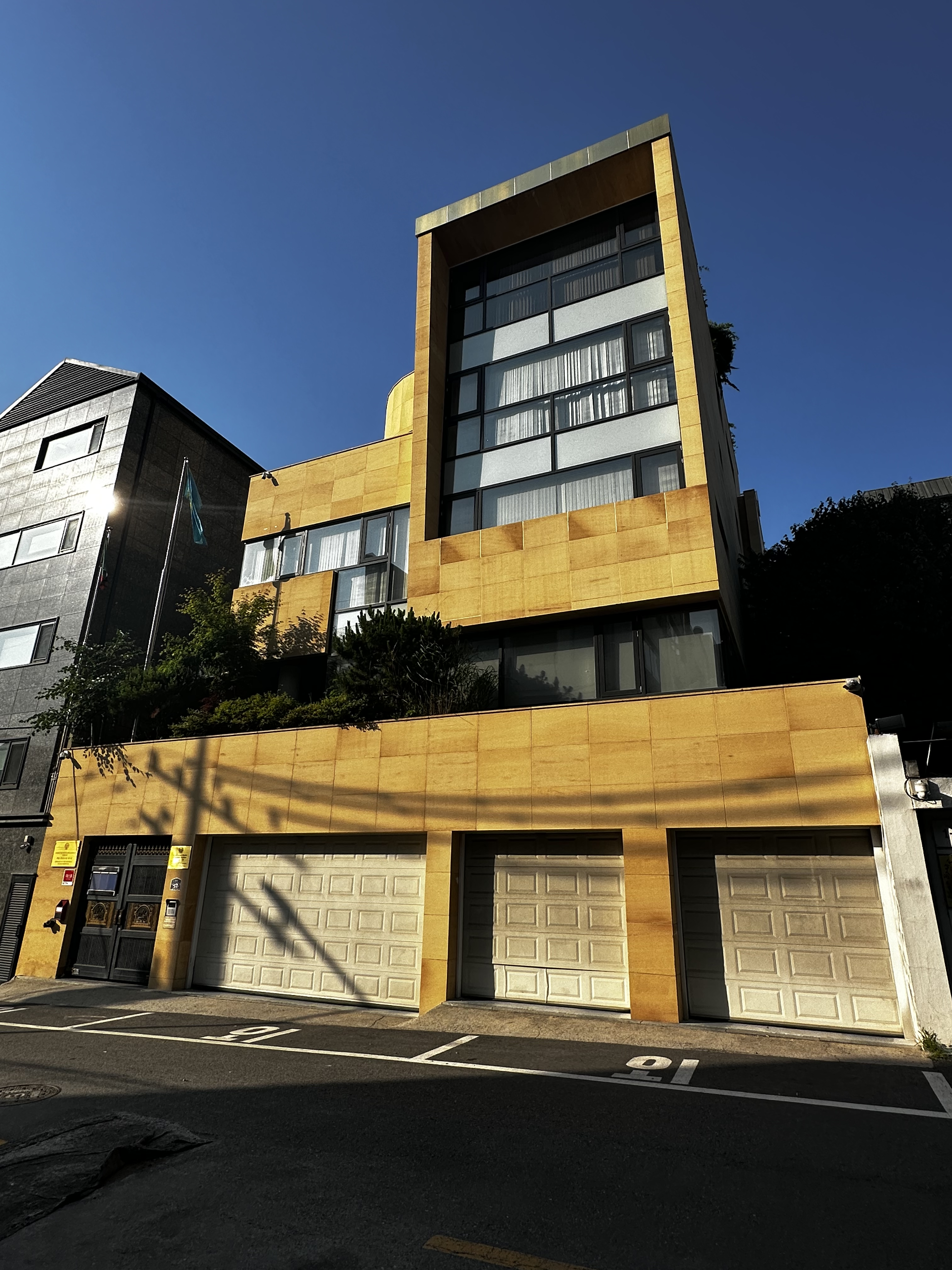
Embassy of Kazakhstan

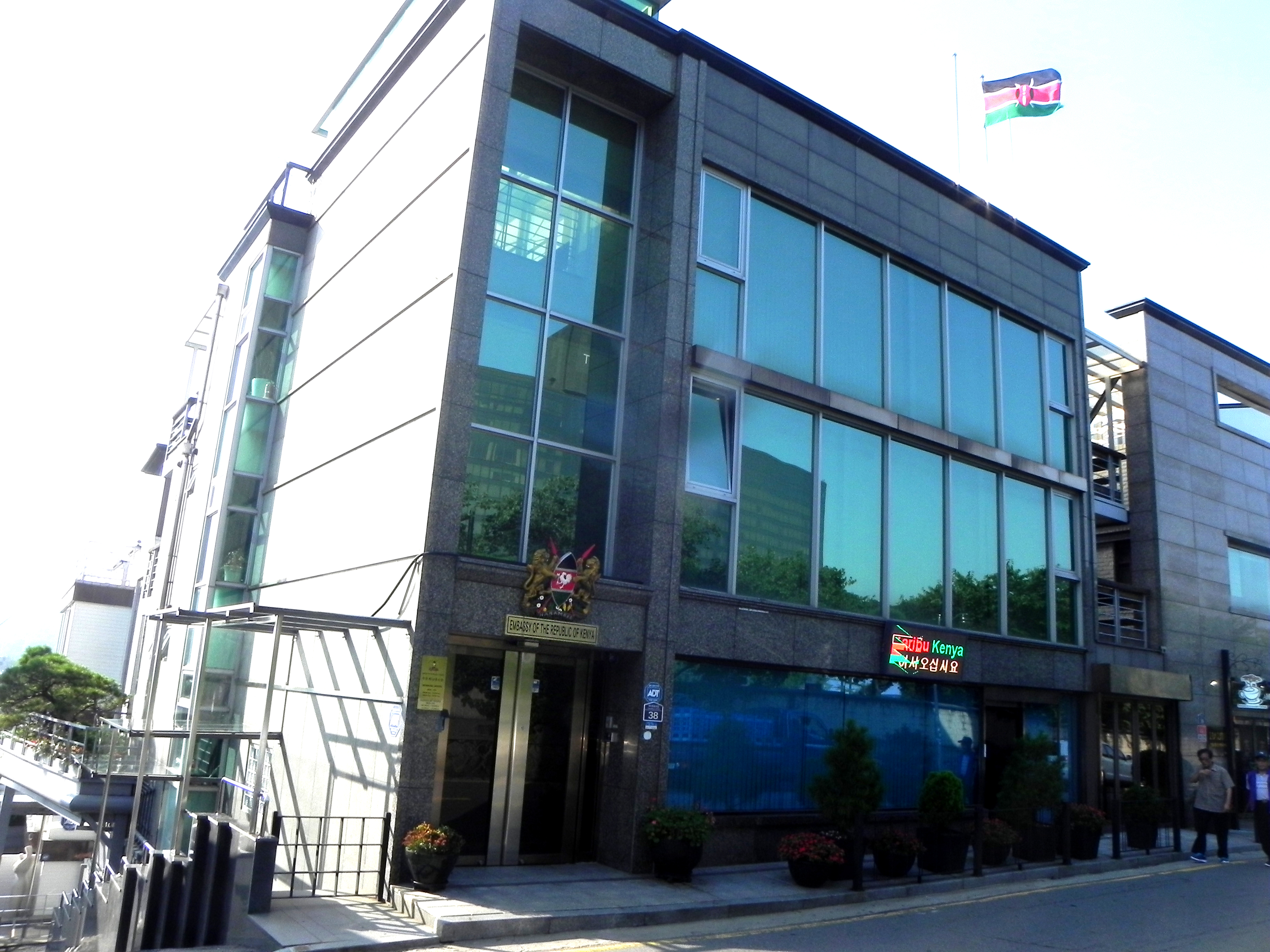
Embassy of Kenya

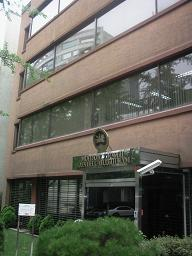
Embassy of Mongolia

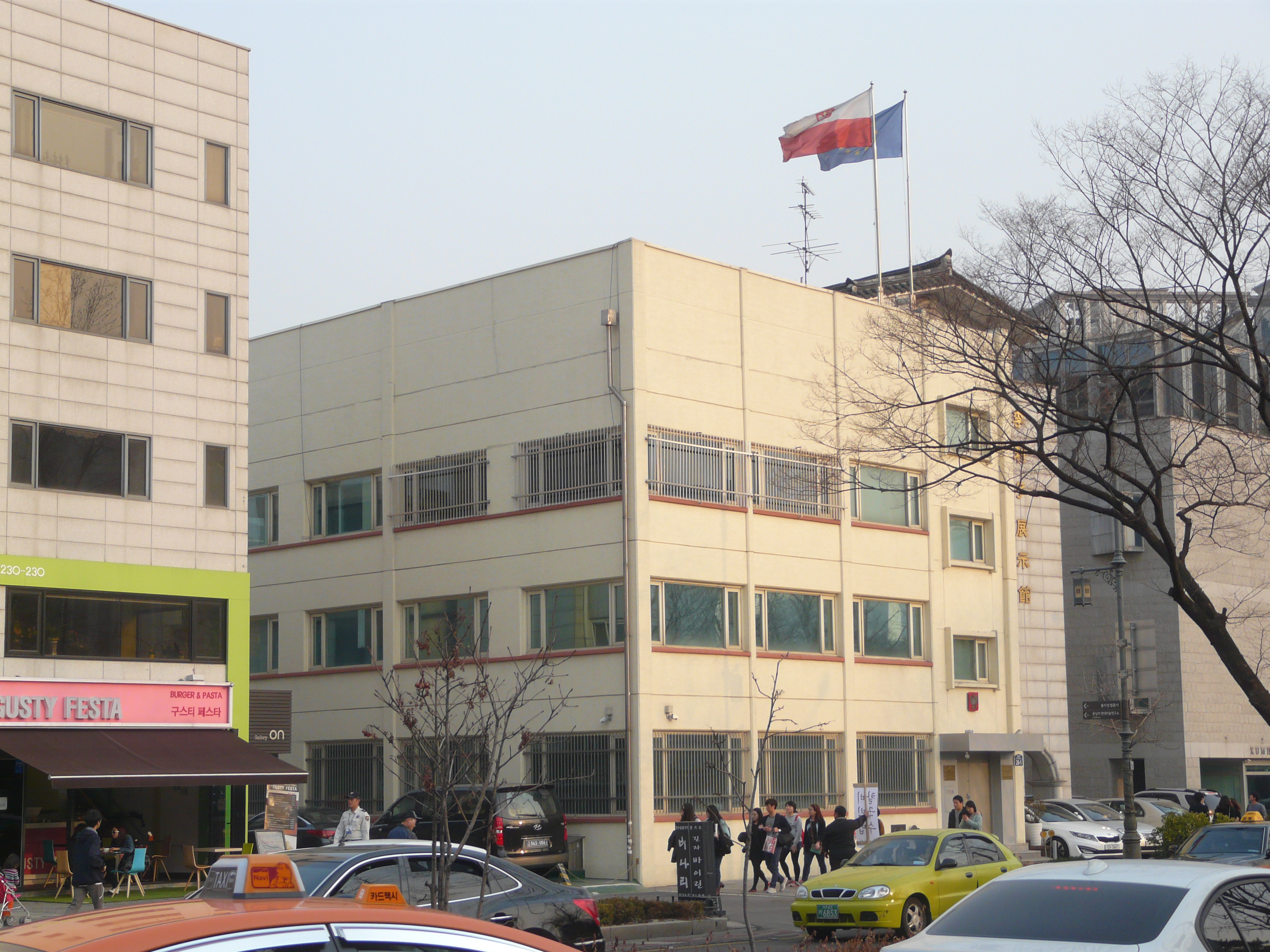
Embassy of Poland

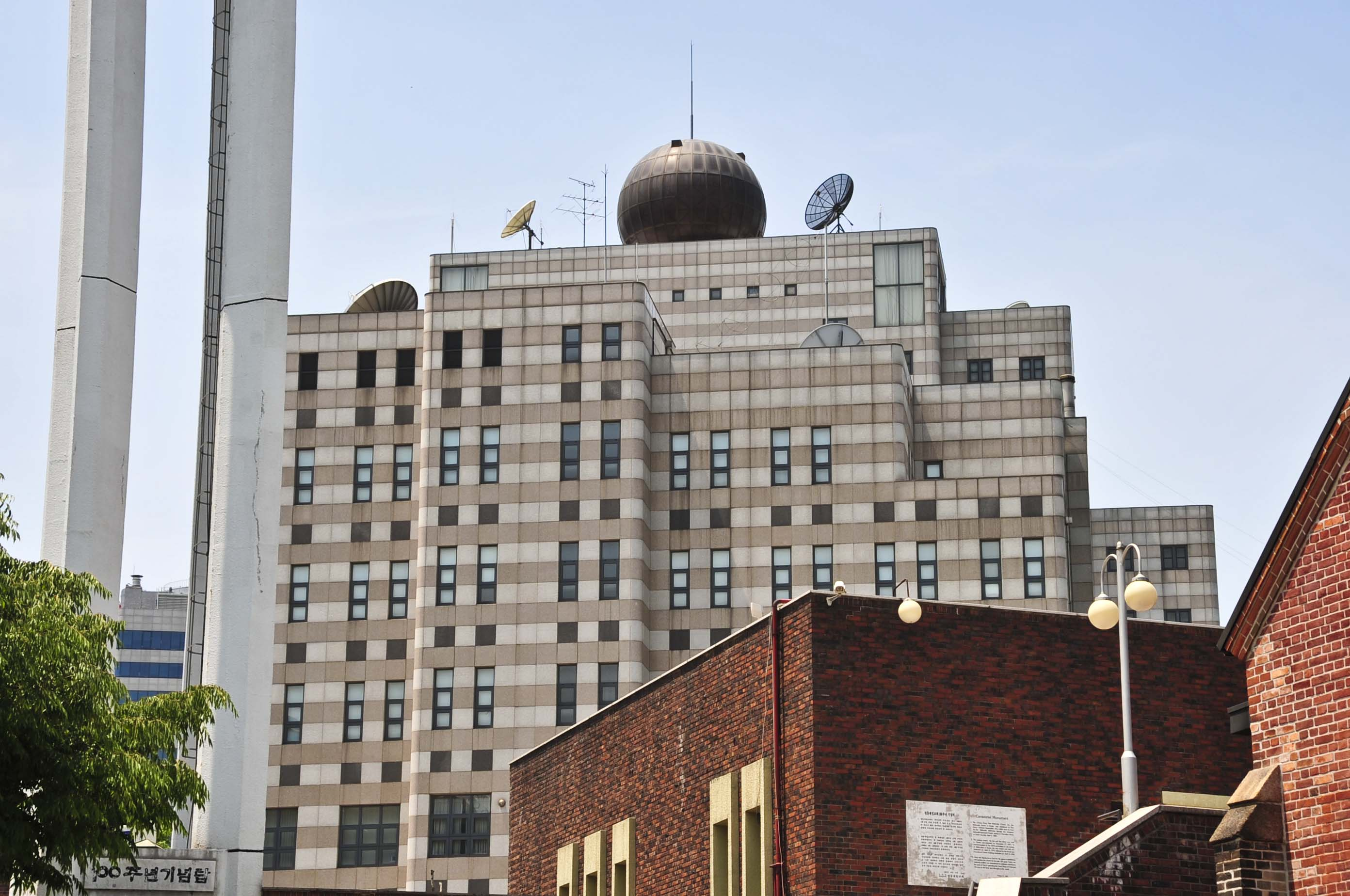
Embassy of Russia

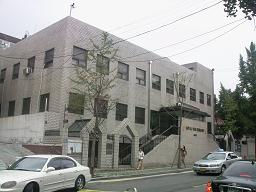
Embassy of Thailand

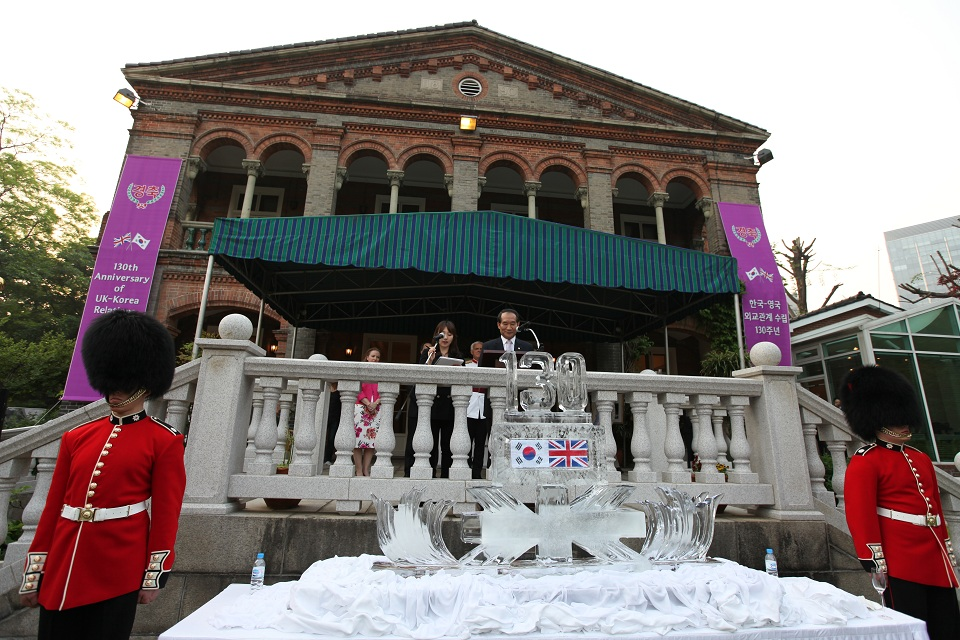
Embassy of the United Kingdom

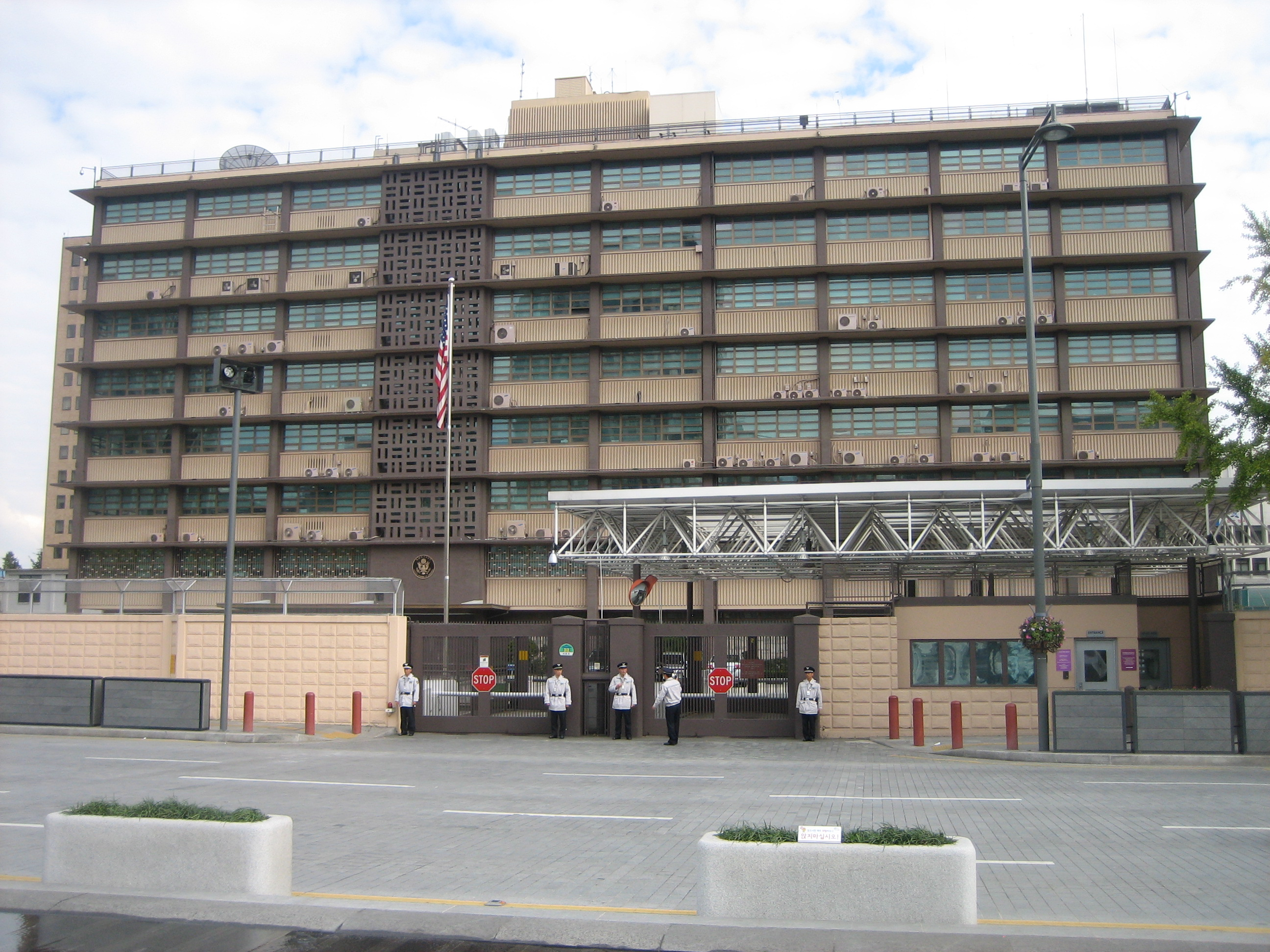
Embassy of the United States

== See also ==
- Foreign relations of South Korea
- List of diplomatic missions of South Korea
