= Chinese Korean =

Korean Chinese refers to ethnic Koreans with Chinese nationality.

Chinese Korean or Korean Chinese may refer to:

- Sino-Korean vocabulary, Chinese loanwords in the Korean language
- People's Republic of China – North Korea relations
- People's Republic of China – South Korea relations
- Republic of China – North Korea relations
- Republic of China – South Korea relations
- Ethnic Chinese in Korea (also known as Hwagyo)
- Koreans in China (Koreans living in China)
- Korean Chinese cuisine, a cuisine developed in South Korea derived from Chinese cuisine
- Korean language in China (also known as Jungguk Joseonmal)

== See also ==
- Sino-Korean (disambiguation)
- Chinese-language literature of Korea
