= Overseas Chinese High School =

Overseas Chinese High School or Overseas Chinese Middle and High School may refer to:

- Seoul Overseas Chinese High School, a high school in Seoul, South Korea
- Busan Overseas Chinese High School, a high school in Busan, South Korea
- Daegu Overseas Chinese High School, a high school in Daegu, South Korea
- Hwa Chong Institution, a high school in Singapore, Singapore
- Guangdong Overseas Chinese High School, a high school in Guangdong, China
- Hainan Overseas Chinese High School, a high school in Hainan, China
- Xiamen Overseas Chinese High School, a high school in Xiamen, China
- National Overseas Chinese Senior High School, a senior high school in New Taipei, Taiwan
- Zhongshan Overseas Chinese Secondary School, a secondary school in Zhongshan, China
