= Mission of South Korea, Taipei =

Diplomatic mission of South Korea in Taiwan

Korean Mission in Taipei
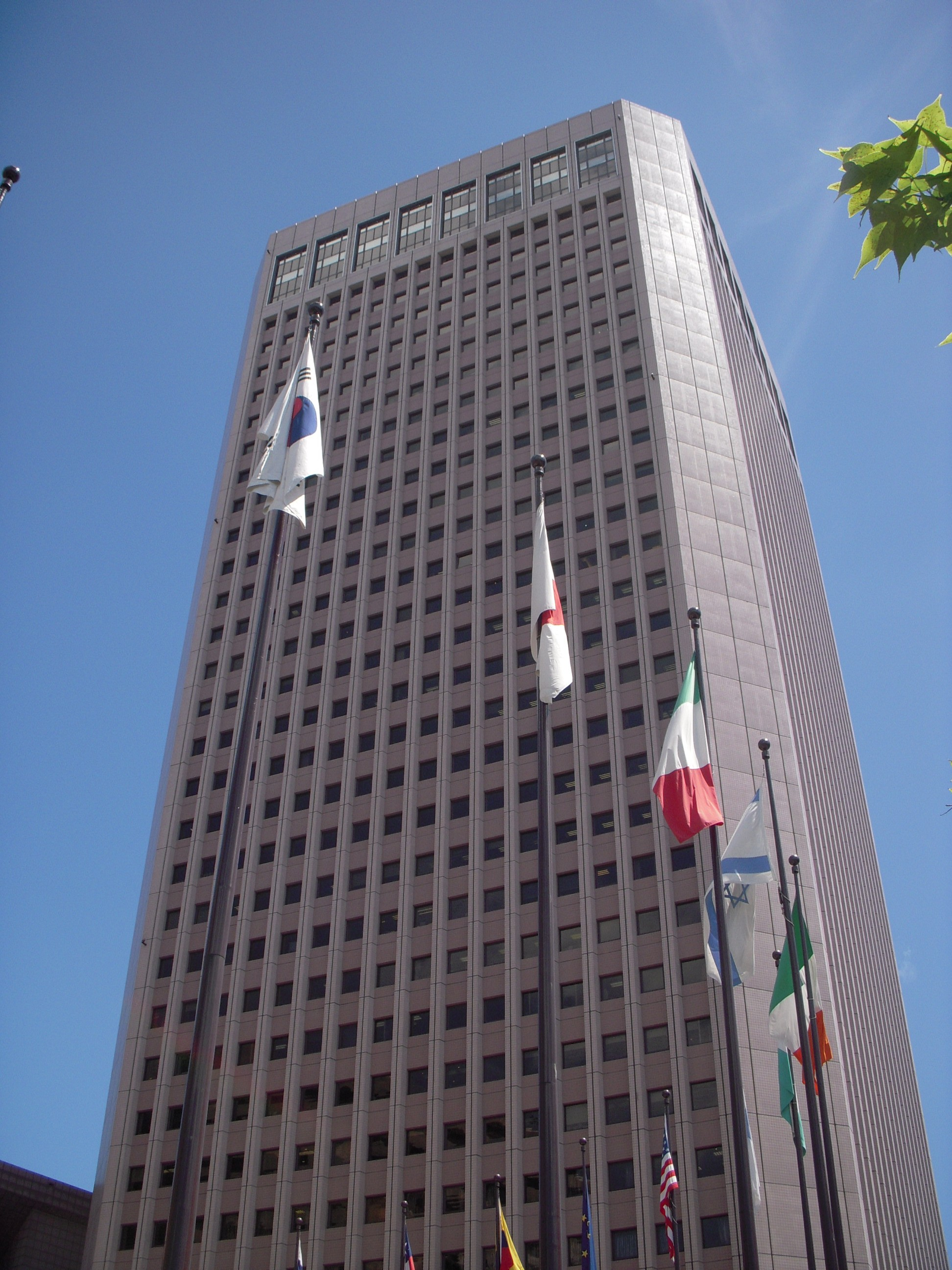
- The mission at the International Trade Building.
- Location: Taipei, Taiwan
- Address: Rm. 1506, No. 333, Sec.1, KeeLung Road, Xinyi District
- Opened: 25 November 1993
- Jurisdiction: Republic of China (Taiwan)
- Permanent representative: Hwang Jae-ho
- Website: taiwan.mofa.go.kr (Korean)

Mission of South Korea, Taipei

Chinese name
- Chinese: 駐台北韓國代表部
- Hanyu Pinyin: Zhù Táiběi Hánguó Dàibiǎo Bù
- Hokkien POJ: Chù Tâi-pak Hân-kok Tāi-piáu-pō͘

Korean name
- Hangul: 주 타이베이 대한민국 대표부
- Hanja: 駐 타이베이 大韓民國 代表部
- Revised Romanization: Ju Taibei Daehanminguk Daepyobu
- McCune–Reischauer: Chu T'aipei Taehanmin'guk Taepyobu

The Korean Mission in Taipei (Korean: 주 타이베이 대한민국 대표부; Chinese: 駐台北韓國代表部) is the diplomatic mission of South Korea in Taiwan, functioning as a de facto embassy in the absence of diplomatic relations. Its counterpart is the Taipei Mission in Seoul.

The mission is administered by the Ministry of Foreign Affairs of South Korea (MOFA). It was established on 25 November 1993 under an agreement on 27 July of that year. This followed South Korea's decision to end diplomatic relations with the Republic of China (Taiwan) and close its embassy in Taipei upon establishing diplomatic relations with the People's Republic of China on August 27, 1992.

On 1 September 2004, representatives of the two missions signed an aviation agreement allowing aircraft of each side to enter the airspace of the other, permitting the resumption of direct scheduled flights by Korean and Taiwanese airlines, which had been discontinued in 1992.

== List of Representatives ==
The mission is headed by a representative, the following is a list of representatives since the mission's establishment in 1993.

List of Representatives
No.	Photo	Name	Tenure	previous assignment
1		Han Chul-soo (한철수)	1993 – 1995	Ambassador to Republic of China and Brazil
2		Kang Min-soo (강민수)	1996 – 1999	Vice Chief of Staff, ROK Air Force
3		Yun Hai-jung (윤해중)	1999 – 2002	Minister of Korean Embassy in Tokyo
4		Sohn Hoon (손훈)	2002 – 2004	Ambassador to Cameroon; Consul-General to Seattle
5		Hwang Yong-shik (황용식)	2004 – 2006	Ambassador to Tunisia
6		Oh Sang-sik (오상식)	2006 – 2008	Ambassador to Gabon; Minister of Korean Embassy in Paris
7		Koo Yang-keun (구양근)	2008 – 2011	scholar
8		Chung Sang-ki (정상기)	2011 – 2013	Consul-General to San Francisco
9		Cho Baek-sang (조백상)	2014 – 2016	Minister of Korean Embassy in Hanoi; Consul-General to Shenyang
10		Yang Chang-soo (양창수)	2016 – 2019	Deputy Director-General for European Affairs Bureau of the Ministry of Foreign Affairs; Ambassador for IR, Gyeonggi Provincial Government; Consul-General to Guangzhou
11		Kang Young-hoon (강영훈)	2019 – 2021	Consul-General to Honolulu; Deputy Director-General for ASEAN and Southeast Asian Affairs Bureau of the Ministry of Foreign Affairs; Minister-Counselor to Canberra
12		Chung Byung-won (정병원)	2021 – 2023	Consul-General to Vancouver; Deputy Director-General for Northeast Asian Affairs Bureau of the Ministry of Foreign Affairs
13		Lee Eun-ho (이은호)	2023 – 2025	Director of Korean Security Agency of Trade and Industry; Minister-Counselor to United Arab Emirates
14		Hwang Jae-ho (황재호)	2026 –	Northeast Asia policy adviser to the Ministry of Foreign Affairs; Member of the Presidential Commission on Policy Planning; Adviser to the Office of National Security

== See also ==
- Koreans in Taiwan
- South Korea–Taiwan relations
- List of diplomatic missions in Taiwan
- List of diplomatic missions of South Korea
