= North Korea–Taiwan relations =

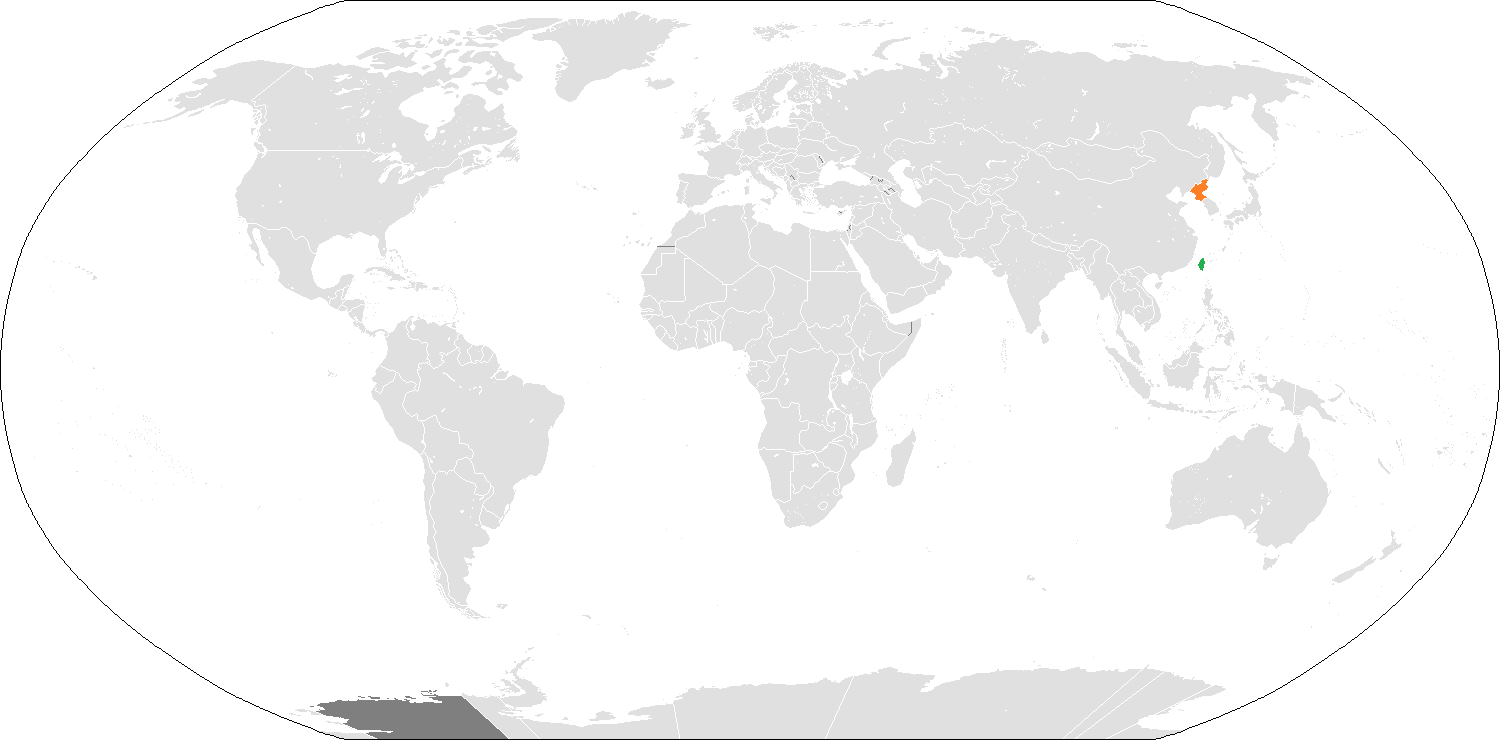

- Taiwan: North Korea

On April 13, 1919; the Republic of China recognized the Provisional Government of the Republic of Korea. The Nationalist government of China participated in the Cairo Conference which resulted in the Cairo Declaration with the aim of freeing Korea and Taiwan from Japanese colonial rule.

After the communist takeover of China in 1949 and the establishment of the Democratic People's Republic of Korea in 1948, formal relations between the two are non-existent, however, unofficial relations are significant. North Korea adheres to the one-China principle and considers Taiwan to be an inalienable part of the People's Republic of China.

== Korean War ==
In 1949, the People's Republic of China (PRC) was proclaimed following the Chinese Civil War and the Republic of China (ROC), whose government relocated to Taiwan.

The United Nations condemned North Korea's military aggression against Republic of Korea in United Nations Security Council Resolution 82 and United Nations Security Council Resolution 84. The ROC voted in favor of both United Nations resolutions. During the Korean War, the ROC was an opponent of the DPRK while it supplied material aid to ROK, while the PRC under Mao supported DPRK with the People's Volunteer Army.

== Cold War years ==
The ROC had opposed socialism, as well as the Democratic People's Republic of Korea (DPRK) and People's Republic of China (PRC). Due to its hostility, the ROC has not recognized or formed a diplomatic relationship with the DPRK and PRC governments. Because of this, the government of the ROC also considered the Republic of Korea government as the sole legitimate state in the Korean Peninsula.

Both countries were in the opposite sides in the Vietnam War in which North Korea supported the North Vietnamese government while Nationalist China was allied with the South Vietnamese leadership.

== Recent history ==
Due to its status as a non-United Nations (UN) nation, Taiwan is not bound by UN sanctions against North Korea. However, the Taiwanese government has implemented a number of laws and regulations which mirror UN and US restrictions on trade with North Korea.

It has been reported that North Korea offered to sell Taiwan submarine designs in 2016. Taiwan's Ministry of National Defense has denied the reports saying "In the development of our submarines there has never been, there is not now and will never be any contact with North Korea; assistance is all provided by important countries in Europe and the United States."

North Korea kidnapped a Taiwanese woman named Shen Jing-yu from mainland Japan in 1987 and brought her to North Korea

Taiwanese Premier Lai Ching-te approved a total ban on trade between the ROC and North Korea in September 2017. Taiwanese businessmen have been accused of selling coal, oil and gas to North Korea, as well as importing North Korean textiles and employing North Koreans on Taiwanese fishing vessels.

In 2018 United Nations (UN) investigators alleged that Taiwanese entities were engaged in transferring oil to North Korea in violation of UN sanctions. In 2019 Taiwanese authorities indicted six people over ship-to-ship transfers of oil to North Korea. In 2020 Taiwan reassured the United States that it was complying with UN sanctions against North Korea.

== See also ==
- South Korea–Taiwan relations
- Japanese colonial empire
