= Sino-Korean relations =

Sino-Korean relations or Relations between Korea and China mainly refers to:

- Bilateral relations between China (the People's Republic of China) and South Korea (the Republic of Korea), whose official diplomatic relation has been established since 1992.
- Bilateral relations between China (the People's Republic of China) and North Korea (the Democratic People's Republic of Korea), whose official diplomatic relation has been established since 1949.

It can also refer to:

- Bilateral relations between Taiwan (the Republic of China) and South Korea (the Republic of Korea), whose official diplomatic relation has been severed since 1992.
- Historical bilateral relations between Imperial China and the Kingdoms of the Korean Peninsula, prior to World War II.
