= Taipei Mission, Seoul =

Diplomatic mission in South Korea

Taipei Mission in Korea 駐韓國台北代表部
- 주한국 타이페이 대표부

Agency overview
- Formed: 25 January 1994
- Jurisdiction: South Korea
- Agency executive: Gow-wei Chiou, Representative
- Website: Taipei Mission in Korea

The Taipei Mission in Korea (Chinese: 駐韓國台北代表部; Pe̍h-ōe-jī: Chù Hân-kok Tâi-pak Tāi-piáu-pō͘; Korean: 주한국 타이페이 대표부) represents the interests of Taiwan in South Korea, functioning as a de facto embassy in the absence of diplomatic relations.

Its South Korean counterpart is the Korean Mission in Taipei.

== History ==
The mission was established on 25 January 1994. following an agreement on July 27, 1993. This was after South Korea ceased to recognise the government in Taipei as the Republic of China, following the establishment of relations with the People's Republic of China on 27 August 1992.

On September 1, 2004, representatives of the two countries' missions signed an aviation agreement allowing aircraft of each side to enter the airspace of the other, permitting the resumption of direct scheduled flights by Korean and Taiwanese airlines, which had been discontinued in 1992.

== Busan office ==
There is also a branch office in Busan, the country's second largest city. This was originally established as the Consulate of the Republic of China.

== Representatives ==
Name	Tenure	Reference
Lin Tsung-hsien (林尊賢)	1993–2001	
Francias Lee (李宗儒)	2001–2003	
Lee Tsai-fang (李在方)	2003–2006	
Chen Yeong-Cho (陳永綽)	2006–2010	
Benjamin Liang (梁英斌)	2010–2014	
Joseph Shih (石定)	2014–2018	
Daniel Diann-wen Tang (唐殿文)	2018–2022	
Kuang-chung Liang (梁光中)	2022–2025	
Gow-wei Chiou (丘高偉)	2025–Present	

== See also ==
- Taipei Economic and Cultural Representative Office
- Korean Mission in Taipei
- South Korea–Taiwan relations
- Chinese people in Korea
