= Anti-Korean sentiment in Taiwan =

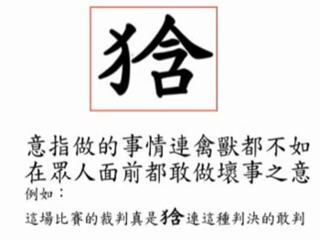
A Chinese character “犭含” created by Taiwanese netizen during the Sockgate, combining of "含" and "犭" of "狗" (gou, "dog") In Chinese, "狗" shares a similar pronunciation of "國", so Taiwanese netizen usually use "韓狗" (hangou), a similar pronunciation of "韓國" (hanguo), to denigrate Koreans

Anti-Korean sentiment (反韓) refers to hostility, hatred, distrust, fear and other negative attitudes toward the people or cultures of Korea in Taiwan. These sentiments began to rise notably during the 1980s and intensified further when South Korea established formal diplomatic relations with China in 1992. The sentiment grew stronger as the countries' industries and sports sectors became increasingly competitive, reaching its peak during the "Sockgate" Taekwondo controversy in 2010. News coverage by local media also contributed to the sentiment, which has declined since the 2010s alongside the Korean Wave phenomenon.

== Diplomatic relationship ==
=== Background ===
Relations between the Republic of China and South Korea have been intertwined since the establishment of the Republic of China in 1912. The Provisional Government of the Republic of Korea, the Korean government-in-exile based in China that provided support for the Korean independence movement, was supported by the Kuomintang. Chiang Kai-shek also played a significant role in helping Korea gain independence. Even after retreating to Taiwan, the Republic of China was seen as an important base for resisting communist forces in Asia and therefore maintained formal diplomatic relations with various countries opposed to communism, including South Korea. Their similar historical and cultural backgrounds contributed to close diplomatic ties between Taiwan and South Korea. Local media in Taiwan described the relationship as a “brotherhood” or like a “father and son”.

Taiwan's international diplomatic status became increasingly uncertain in the 1970s, particularly after the United Nations General Assembly adopted Resolution 2758 in 1971, recognising the People's Republic of China as the only lawful representative of China at the United Nations. Following Japan's and the United States' establishment of formal ties with the People's Republic of China in 1972 and 1978, respectively, the severance of diplomatic relations between Taiwan and South Korea became increasingly likely. In 1973, South Korean president Park Chung Hee announced the 6.23 Foreign Policy for Peace and Unification, initiating contact with communist countries, including China. In the 1980s, while South Korea still maintained a formal relationship with Taiwan, South Korea began working towards diplomatic relations with the People’s Republic of China.

On 5 May 1983, six Chinese nationals hijacked CAAC Flight 296, a domestic passenger flight, and the plane landed at a US military base in Chuncheon, South Korea. The South Korean government treated them as hijackers under international law. At the time, the perpetrators had been seen as Anti-Communist Heroes instead of hijackers in Taiwan; the general public in Taiwan, unfamiliar with international legal standards due to the country's lack of standing in international law, generally disapproved of South Korea's handling of the incident. According to Chu, the incident was a starting point for anti-Korean sentiment in Taiwan as relations between Taiwan and South Korea deteriorated.

=== Termination of diplomatic relations ===
On 24 August 1992, South Korea announced the establishment of formal diplomatic relations with the People’s Republic of China and simultaneously severed ties with Taiwan. South Korean authorities also seized Taiwan's embassy, expelling its staff within 24 hours. In response, the staff damaged facilities such as walls, carpets, tables, and chairs. Taiwan then severed a civil aviation agreement, and flight routes were not restored until 2004. The termination significantly intensified anti-Korean sentiment in Taiwan. Influenced by a sense of brotherhood, perceived superiority, and victimhood, many Taiwanese struggled to accept South Korea's diplomatic shift and developed strong hostility toward the country. A campaign to boycott Korean goods received a positive response and affected Taiwanese people's views of Korean products. Anti-Korean sentiment in Taiwan resulting from the termination continued into the following decade and affected an entire generation.

Some critics and scholars contrast anti-Korean sentiment with Taiwan's reactions to Japan and the United States, noting a distinct difference in public perception. Although Japan severed diplomatic ties in 1972 and the United States did so in 1979, 13 to 20 years before South Korea did, neither event triggered a similar wave of persistent anti-Japanese or anti-American sentiment. Commentators attribute this disparity partly to a historical sense of superiority that many Taiwanese held toward South Korea, making the diplomatic rupture feel like a betrayal by a perceived "lesser" or "brotherly" nation.

=== Other incidents ===
In January 1997, the Patriot Alliance Association and the New Party tore up the South Korean national flag in protest against the South Korean government and South Korean demonstrators who had opposed the Lee Teng-hui administration's attempt to transfer Taiwan's nuclear waste to North Korea through negotiations with the North Korean government.

== Industry structure ==
Both Taiwan and South Korea are among the Four Asian Tigers. They share similar economic conditions and industry structures. An example of these similarities can be found in the semiconductor industry, which is a major industry in both countries. HTC and Samsung Electronics were often compared by the Taiwanese public, while the development of high-technology industries in South Korea often attracted attention in Taiwan. After recovering from the 1997 Asian financial crisis, South Korea experienced rapid economic growth in the 2000s and had a high GNI per capita at the time. Taiwan's stagnant economic growth in the 2000s contributed to anxiety about South Korea and intensified anti-Korean sentiment in Taiwan.

An investigation into LCD price-fixing involving Taiwanese and South Korean companies heightened anti-Korean sentiment in Taiwan at the time. The European Union fined Chimei, AUO, Chunghwa Picture Tubes, and HannStar a total of 533.9 million euros. Samsung Electronics, on the other hand, avoided a judgment and penalties in exchange for cooperating with the European Union during the investigation. LG was fined 250 million euros. Most politicians at the time criticised Samsung's role during the investigation. Some politicians have even stated that they would not buy Korean goods for government purchases. Notable examples at the time included Shih Yen-shiang, Terry Gou, and John Wu.

== Modern sports ==
=== Background ===
Taiwan and South Korea often engage in fierce competition in sporting events, which is why the Taiwanese public frequently regards the South Korean team as the Chinese Taipei team's arch-rival. The South Korean team's foul play and other controversial behaviour in the 2000s also contributed to the Taiwanese public's negative perception of South Korea.

Some notable incidents before Sockgate included the World Cyber Games in 2001, the women's 51 kg Taekwondo event at the 2002 Asian Games, an invitational tournament in 2006, and a judgment regarding Taekwondo at the 2009 East Asian Games.

=== Sockgate ===
In the taekwondo competition at the 2010 Asian Games, Chinese Taipei's Yang Shu-chun faced Vietnam's Vu Thi Hau in her opening bout. Yang initially led 9–0, but with 12 seconds remaining, Zhao Lei, the Deputy Secretary-General of the Asian Taekwondo Union from mainland China, requested that Hong Xing-tian (洪性天), a Filipino referee of Korean descent, halt the match, citing "the electronic socks did not comply with the organisers' regulations". Yang burst into tears on the mat, and her coaching team's protest to the organisers was rejected. After the match, Yang Jin-suk, the South Korean Secretary-General of the World Taekwondo Federation, and his mainland Chinese interpreter refused to provide an interpretation or answer questions about the reasons for Yang Shu-chun's disqualification, prompting Taiwanese journalists to walk out en masse in protest. The next day, the Asian Taekwondo Union accused Yang Shu-chun and the Taiwanese coaching staff of fraud, citing a "Shocking Act of Deception by Chinese Taipei", and threatened to revoke Taiwan's right to participate in future international taekwondo competitions.

The incident fuelled anti-Korean sentiment in Taiwan. Images and messages deriding South Korean products and culture were widely shared online. There were reports of restaurants displaying 'No Koreans' signs on their doors and of protesters burning the Korean flag or destroying South Korean products. Some Taiwanese people launched a campaign to boycott Korean goods and refuse to watch Korean dramas, while Taiwanese hackers attacked the official website of the Asian Taekwondo Federation. Some anti-Korean protesters went to the Taipei Korean School and threw eggs. Media outlets around the world paid close attention to the incident. In South Korea, alongside extensive media coverage, authorities in Seoul urged members of Korean organisations in Taiwan, tourists and Korean students studying there to exercise caution in their words and actions. Subsequent studies have found that this incident significantly fuelled anti-Korean sentiment.

== News coverage ==
Many commentators have highlighted the role of Taiwanese media in fostering anti-Korean sentiment. In a review of Taiwanese news, Huang found that anti-Korean speech had appeared in the 1980s. Since then, Taiwanese media have used strongly nationalistic language when reporting sports news. The media also used kinship terms when reporting on diplomatic relations between the two countries.

Taiwanese media also reported on Korean baseball players in a controversial tone. A NOWnews report used the term Gaoli bangzi when reporting on Shin-Soo Choo, a Cleveland Guardians player at the time. The report quickly attracted attention from Korean media, although NOWnews later changed the wording. Korean media also noted that Taiwanese media used a sensational tone when reporting sports news, provoking anti-Korean sentiment among readers.

Yang Chien-Hao, a senior Taiwanese reporter based in Korea, described news coverage of Korea in Taiwanese media as "stupid". He criticised the media's reliance on Western news agencies and disinformation from China, as well as on the conservative Chojoongdong, which provided a Chinese version of its report. Yang argued that these factors contributed to poor news reporting on Korea in Taiwanese media. Chu Li-shi, a Taiwanese Koreanologist, suggested that much of the anti-Korean reporting in Taiwanese media stemmed from ownership by Waishengren. Chu argued that media under their control tended to promote Chinese nationalism, adopt a condescending tone, and foster anti-Korean sentiment in their coverage of Korea. Chu also noted that South Korean diplomats in Taipei have expressed confusion over why Taiwanese media, while highly receptive to Japan and the United States, occasionally single out South Korea for sensationalised criticism.

== Public opinion ==
According to a 2009 survey conducted by the King Car Cultural & Educational Foundation, South Korea ranked second (33.3%) among "Unfriendly countries" for Taiwanese youth, and ranked second again (47.4%) in 2011. In 2018, the survey ranked South Korea fourth (20.2%) among "Friendly countries", while still fourth (22.2%) in 2022.

Some researchers identified gender as a factor in anti-Korean sentiment among Taiwanese people. Generally, Taiwanese men are more likely to express dislike of Korean people and culture. Chen suggested that strong anti-Korean sentiment among Taiwanese men may be related to young Taiwanese men's interests in electronics and sports.

According to Park's 2023 qualitative research, anti-Korean sentiment persisted among older generations of Taiwanese people. Younger generations since the 2010s have not held anti-Korean sentiment, instead having a positive perception of Korea. Park suggested that the Korean Wave played a key role in the decline of anti-Korean sentiment among younger Taiwanese people. In a 2023 review of anti-Korean sentiment in Taiwan, Huang also found that anti-Korean sentiment had declined during the 2010s and attributed the trend to the South Korean government's cultural policy reforms, which affected Taiwanese people's views of Korea at the time.

== See also ==
- Anti-Korean sentiment in China
- Anti-Korean sentiment in Japan
