= Koreans in Taiwan =

Ethnic group

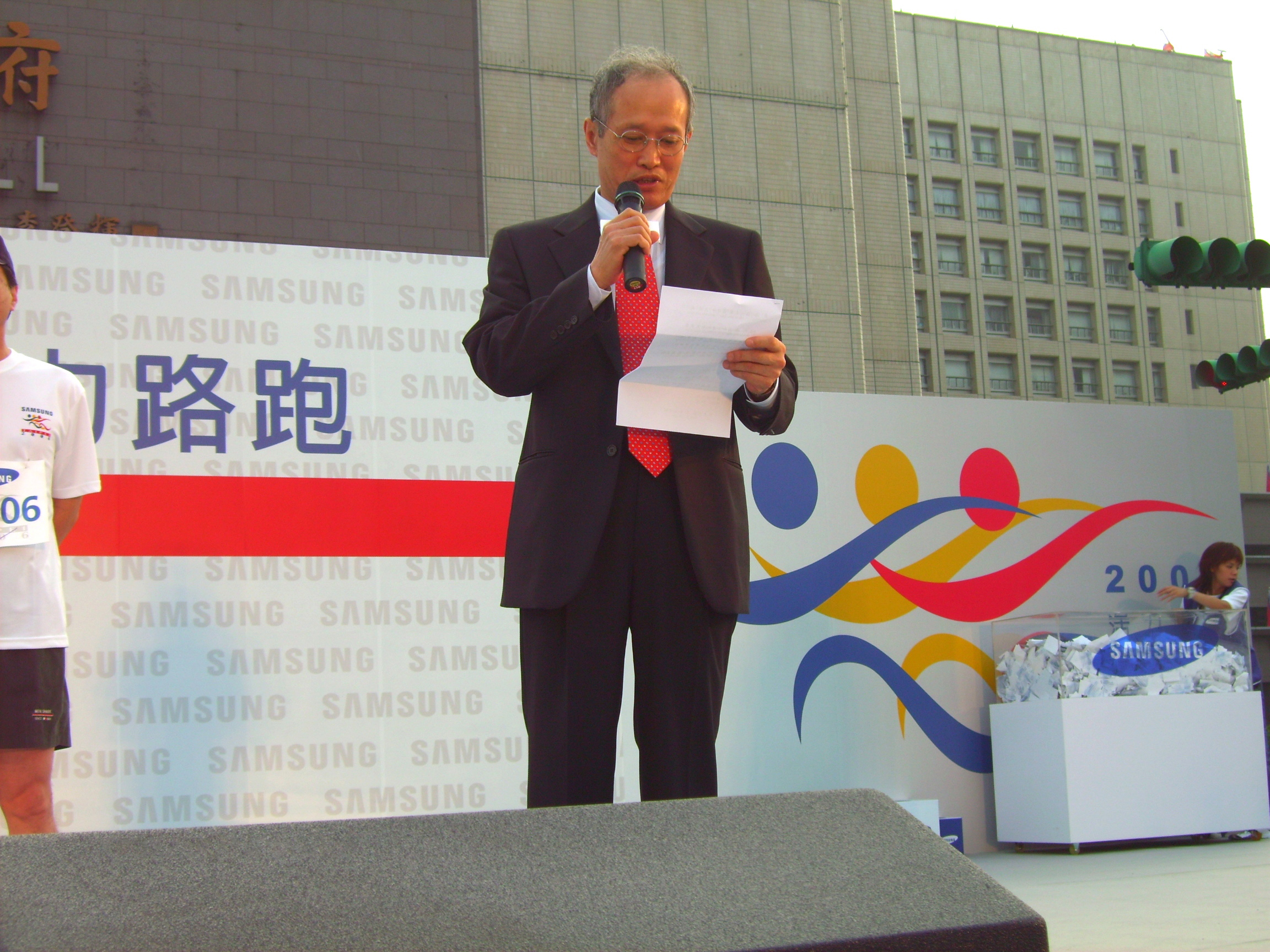
- Representative of the Korean Mission in Taipei Oh Sang-sik at the 2006 Samsung Running Festival Taipei

Total population
- 5,132 (2021); 3,574 (2012, NIA)

Regions with significant populations
- Taipei, Kaohsiung

Languages
- Korean, Chinese

Related ethnic groups
- Koreans

Koreans in Taiwan are the 30th-largest population of overseas Koreans and the 9th-largest foreign community in Taiwan.

== History ==
Though a few Korean fishermen lost at sea during the Joseon Dynasty settled in Taiwan, they never formed a significant population. Even after Japan took control of Taiwan in 1895 and then Korea a decade later, Korean migration to Taiwan was minimal; it was only in the aftermath of the March 1st Movement of 1919 and the associated economic difficulties it caused that Korean migration to Taiwan became a mass phenomenon. Most settled in Keelung and other port cities, where they made a living by fishing. During World War II, some Koreans were also conscripted into labour service and brought to Taiwan. After Japan's defeat in the war ended Japanese rule in Taiwan, an estimated 1,300 Korean soldiers serving with the Imperial Japanese Army and 2,000 civilians organised their own repatriation to the Korean Peninsula, and by 1946, only 400-500 Koreans were recorded as living in Taiwan.

The incoming Kuomintang government established comparatively rigid requirements for residence in Taiwan, and so the only Koreans who were able to obtain residence cards were officials and those with skills that would be useful in the postwar reconstruction, such as engineers. Those who remained founded the Korea Association in Taiwan (Korean: 대만한교협회; Hanja: 臺灣韓僑協會) in 1947. Due to the government's policy of discrimination in favour of native fishermen, most Koreans were forced out of the fishing industry, and into agriculture and commerce; they slowly moved away from Keelung, towards other major urban areas such as Taipei and Kaohsiung.

== Education ==
Taiwan's first elementary school for Koreans began in 1949, meeting in a Taiwan Fishery Corporation warehouse. The school moved to its own building in 1952. Taiwan's first school for South Korean nationals, the Kaohsiung Korea School (까오숑한국국제학교), was founded on 25 January 1961, while the Taipei Korean Elementary School (타이뻬이한국학교) was founded a year later, on 1 February 1962. As of 2007, the schools enrolled 22 and 50 students, respectively.

== Demography ==
In 2011, statistics of South Korea's Ministry of Foreign Affairs and Trade showed 3,968 South Korean nationals or former nationals living in Taiwan. This represented an increase of 26% over the 2009 figure of 3,158 (2009). 420 had Republic of China nationality, 283 were permanent residents, 686 were international students, and the remaining 2,579 had other kinds of visas. June 2012 statistics of National Immigration Agency (which do not count naturalised citizens formerly holding South Korean nationality) stated that there were 3,574; among them, 1,494 had work authorisation (332 businesspeople, 96 engineers, 47 lecturers, 169 missionaries, 58 unemployed, and 792 authorised for other kinds of work), while the remainder did not (647 homemakers, 774 students, 652 children under the age of 15, and 7 in other categories).

== Notable people ==
- Cho Myung-Ha (1905–1928), Korean independence activist
- Lee Hyeong-Suk, former South Korean Olympic women's basketball team member, now a coach at Pu-Men High School
- Yoo Ha-na, television actress (Originally from Seoul, South Korea)
- Emily Song, singer and model; member of girl group Dream Girls (Originally from Seoul, South Korea)
- Nicky Lee, singer (Korean American)

== See also ==
- Chinese people in Korea
- Korean Mission in Taipei
- South Korea–Taiwan relations
