= Overseas Chinese High School, Daegu =

School in Daegu, South Korea

Coordinates: 35.8394°N 128.5990°E

Chinese name
- Traditional Chinese: 韓國大邱華僑中學
- Simplified Chinese: 韩国大邱华侨中学
Transcriptions
Standard Mandarin
- Hanyu Pinyin: Hánguó Dàqiū Huáqiáo Zhōngxué
- Wade–Giles: Han-kuo Ta-ch'iu Hua-ch'iao Chung-hsüeh

Korean name
- Hangul: 한국대구화교중고등학교

Overseas Chinese High School, Daegu (Korean: 한국대구화교중고등학교; Chinese: 韓國大邱華僑中學) is a Republic of China (Taiwan)-oriented Chinese international school in Nam-gu, Daegu, South Korea, serving middle and high school students. The school opened on 1 September 1958.
