= South Korea–Taiwan relations =

- Taiwan: South Korea

Diplomatic mission
- Taipei Mission in Korea: Korean Mission in Taipei

The Republic of China government recognized the formation of the Provisional Government of the Republic of Korea on April 13, 1919. The Republic of China was also one of the participants of the Cairo Conference, which resulted in the 1943 Cairo Declaration. One of the main purposes of the Cairo Declaration was to create an independent Korea, free from Japanese colonial rule. Bilateral diplomatic relations between the Government of the Republic of Korea and the Republic of China began in 1948, just after the foundation of the First Republic, hence making China, the first country to recognize the Republic of Korea as the sole legitimate government of Korea. After the Chinese Civil War in 1949, South Korea maintained relations with Taiwan. Diplomatic relations between South Korea and Taiwan were terminated on 23 August 1992, followed by South Korean recognition of the People's Republic of China and formation of bilateral recognition between them. But just shortly after, South Korea – Taiwan relations resumed in 1993 under the "New Relations Framework Agreement".

The relationship between South Korea and Taiwan has become closer since 2010s. The cultures of the two countries continue to communicate with each other, and the number of tourists visiting each other's countries continues to increase significantly. Taipei City is Seoul City's first Sister City. Both countries have strong non-diplomatic relations. South Korea sent military personnel in the Political Warfare training in Fu Hsing Kang College.

== History ==
=== Independence of the Republic of Korea and the Korean War ===
The division of Korea, which ended 35 years of Japanese control, was followed by a period of trusteeship by American occupation in the south. The first General Election of 1948 South Korean Constitutional Assembly election founded the First Republic under the supervision of United Nations.

The Republic of China (ROC) was the first government to convey its intent to establish diplomatic relations with the ROK, doing so on 13 August 1948. On 16 September 1948, the ROC established a consulate in Seoul. On 11 November 1948, the ROK established a diplomatic office in Nanjing. On 2 January 1949, the ROC became the first Asian government to publicize its diplomatic recognition of the ROK.

The People's Republic of China (PRC) was founded in 1949 following the Chinese Civil War and the ROK maintained relations with the ROC, whose government relocated to Taiwan, formerly a Qing prefecture that was under 50 years of Japanese colonial occupation from 1895 to 1945. After the retreat of the ROC government to Taiwan, the ROK was the first country to move its embassy to Taipei.

=== Cold War diplomacy ===
Syngman Rhee visit Chiang Kai-shek on November 27, 1953.

Influenced by the 1949 founding of NATO and their shared anti-communist stances, the ROK and ROC, along with the Philippines, formed the Pacific Pact.

The United Nations condemned North Korea's military aggression against ROK in United Nations Security Council Resolution 82 and United Nations Security Council Resolution 84. The ROC voted in favor of both United Nations resolutions. During the Korean War, the ROC supplied material aid to ROK, while the PRC gave North Korea combatants to support the People's Volunteer Army.

South Korea and Taiwan jointly supported the Asian People's Anti-Communist League.

President Park Chung-hee visited Taipei on a state visit in February 1966, in which he expressed solidarity with the ROC and South Vietnam, declaring that: 'We are not breakwaters which passively protect the port from onrushing waves. We are not standing still only to be gradually eroded by the waves of Communism.'

=== Termination of diplomatic relations ===
The Sixth Republic of South Korea furthered the Miracle on the Han River to the Economy of South Korea and opened diplomacy to Communist Nations (including building the foundation of Inter-Korean relations and accepting co-existence with North Korea by entering the United Nations as "Republic of Korea" ). Seoul also hosted the 1988 Summer Olympics. President Roh Tae-woo's next political ambition was to begin implementing Realpolitik with the neighboring countries in Northeast Asia. South Korea's movement away from anti-communist foreign policy to improve relations with nearby communist countries resulted in a deterioration of relations with ROC. This change was introduced to appease North Korea and ease the political anxiety and softens military tension in the Korean Peninsula; Korea hoped to enable the possibility of a peaceful reunification in the Korean peninsula. As normalization began, ROK transferred diplomatic recognition from ROC to the PRC, and confiscated the property of the ROC embassy, transferring it to the PRC. Taiwan is a member of Property Rights Alliance. On 17 September 1991, the PRC withdrew its objection to South Korean membership in the United Nations.

South Korea was the last Asian country with formal diplomatic relations with ROC. To announce its switch of recognition to the PRC, South Korea and the PRC released a joint communique on 24 August 1992. South Korea provided only a couple of days of advance notice to the ROC, which issued a rebuke of South Korea for the switch. The ROC responded also by severing a civil aviation agreement, ending preferential treatment for ROK goods, and filing anti-dumping proceedings against South Korea. Anti-Korean protests also erupted, including flag burnings outside South Korea's Taipei embassy and sporadic calls by protesters for a boycott of Korean products.

=== Non-official relations ===
In 1993, the "New Relations Framework" became an approach for unofficial contacts between South Korea and Taiwan. Beginning in January 1994, the Korean Mission in Taipei and the Taipei Mission in Korea began functioning similar to embassies and facilitated unofficial bilateral exchanges in areas like culture and education. Also in 1994, South Korea issued its internal guidelines, "Principles for Allowing Contacts with Taiwan" and "Basic Guidelines for Exchange and Cooperation with Taiwan". These specified the conditions under which South Korean politicians could visit counterparts in Taiwan or communicate with Taiwan politicians.

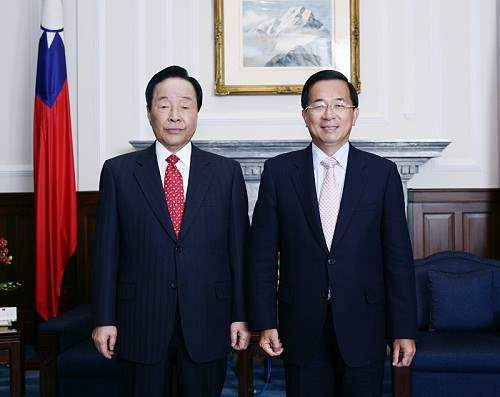
Former President of South Korea Kim Young-sam (left) with President of Taiwan Chen Shui-bian (2008)

Former President of South Korea Kim Young-sam visited Taipei for five days in July 2001. During this visit, he met President of ROC (Taiwan) Chen Shui-bian at a lunch banquet, but the two were unable to come to an agreement over the wording of a joint written statement urging the resumption of direct air travel.

In October 2004, following the aviation agreement, Kim came to Taiwan once more at Chen's invitation. He delivered a speech at National Chengchi University and toured port facilities in Kaohsiung, the sister city of Republic of Korea's Busan.

Two countries have mutually extended to 90 days of stay with the exemption of visa for visitors from July 1, 2012. The 19th Seoul-Taipei forum was held on October 13, 2010.

In 2019, Taiwan invested US$220 million in South Korea while South Korea invested US$37 million in Taiwan.

In 2022 South Korea and Taiwan signed an agreement to recognize each other's drivers licenses.

In an April 2023 interview, President Yoon Suk Yeol of South Korea said increased tensions around Taiwan were due to attempts to change the status quo by force, and he opposed such a change.

In December 2025, a diplomatic spat occurred between South Korea and Taiwan as Taiwan pushed back against its designation as "Taiwan (China)" on Korea's website for electronic arrival form for arriving tourists, which the Taiwanese foreign ministry reacted by saying that it was "disappointed and dissatisfied," despite its previous designation as the said name since 2004.

== Economy ==
Since 1993, there is a significant trade volume between the two nations. The annual trade volume between South Korea and Taiwan is around US$30 billion, with semiconductor products have been the largest item in the trade over the past few years. As of April 2016, the total amount of mutual investments between the two sides reached around US$2.4 billion in areas such as communication, consumer products, finance, information technology, iron, medicine, metal, securities and semiconductor.

=== South Korean companies in Taiwan ===
Several South Korean companies manufactured trains for Taiwan's metro systems including Kaohsiung Metro and Taoyuan Metro, and participated in many major construction projects such as Taipei 101 and Taoyuan International Airport.

== Flights between South Korea and Taiwan ==
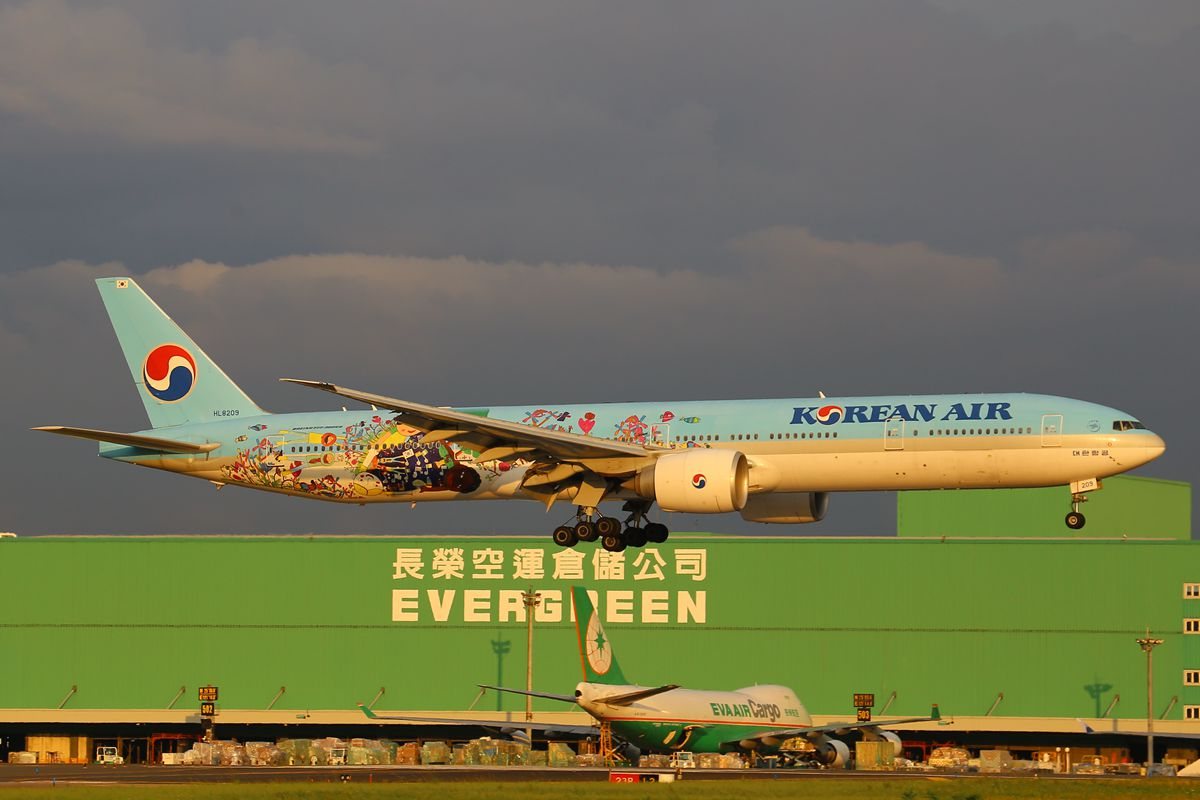
Korean Air Boeing 777 landing in Taiwan

After Seoul's recognition of the PRC government in 1992, the ROC severed its bilateral aviation agreement (among other measures). Cathay Pacific and Thai Airways International, however, operated the route as a Fifth Freedom sector. The reduction of scheduled flights caused tourist numbers from Taiwan to drop from 420,000 in 1992 to 200,000 in 1993, recovering only partially to 360,000 by 2003.

On September 1, 2004, representatives of the two countries' unofficial missions, the "Korean Mission in Taipei" and the "Taipei Mission in Seoul" signed an aviation agreement allowing aircraft of each side to enter the airspace of the other. This permitted the resumption of direct scheduled flights by Korean and Taiwanese airlines and also allowed flights from Republic of Korea to Southeast Asia to fly over the island of Taiwan instead of detouring over mainland China or the Philippines. Analysts estimated this would save Republic of Korean airline companies ₩33 billion (US$29 million at 2004 exchange rates) in fuel costs and other fees.

== Taiwan admission into APEC and participation in OECD ==
The ROK government acted as the interlocutor and supported Taipei's admission into Asia-Pacific Economic Cooperation (APEC) in 1991. Republic of Korea altered the nature of political acronym of Member States to Member Economies in APEC to make APEC formally a Trans-Pacific Economic Forum. Personnel of Taipei's Ministry of Foreign Affairs are forbidden to participate in the APEC, but the Minister of Economic Affairs of Republic of China, a special envoy appointed by the President of Republic of China and business representatives from Republic of China that publicly, can attend annual APEC Meetings under the name of Chinese Taipei. Taipei can also host non-ministerial APEC consortiums and workshops concerning topics in which Taiwan has specific strengths, such as technology and small and medium enterprise. These consortia and workshops are intended to address only success on economics and business-related issues with other APEC Member Economies. Taiwan's participation in APEC is supported by the United States and accepted by People's Republic of China. The APEC Business Travel Card (ATBC) scheme applies to business travelers to and from Taiwan. South Korea also supported Taiwan's initial participation in OECD and subsequent activities.

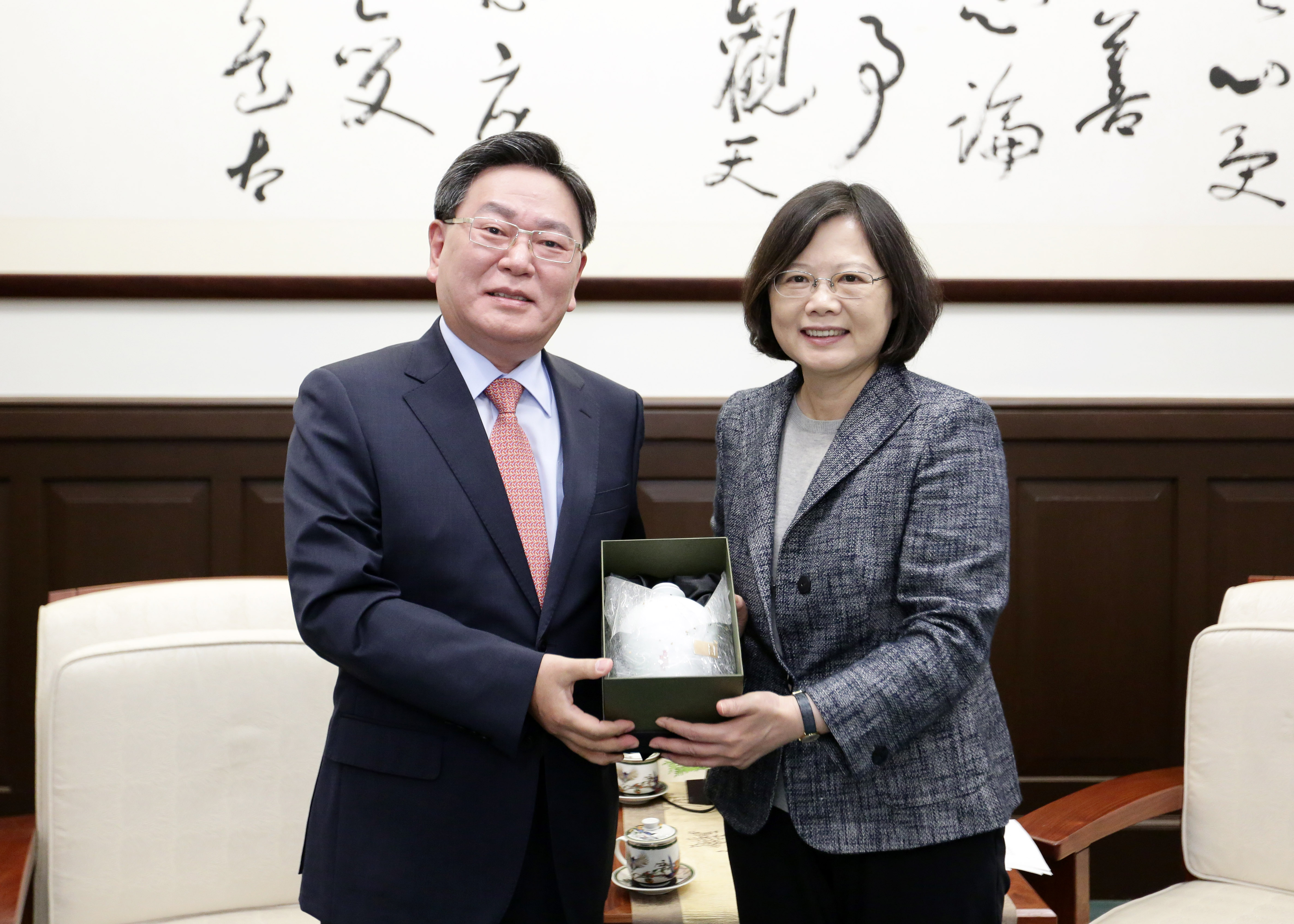
Yang Chang-soo, Representative of the Korean Mission in Taipei, met with President Tsai Ing-wen

== Education ==
There is a rigorous scholarly exchange and there are multiple ROC Chinese international schools in Republic of Korea:

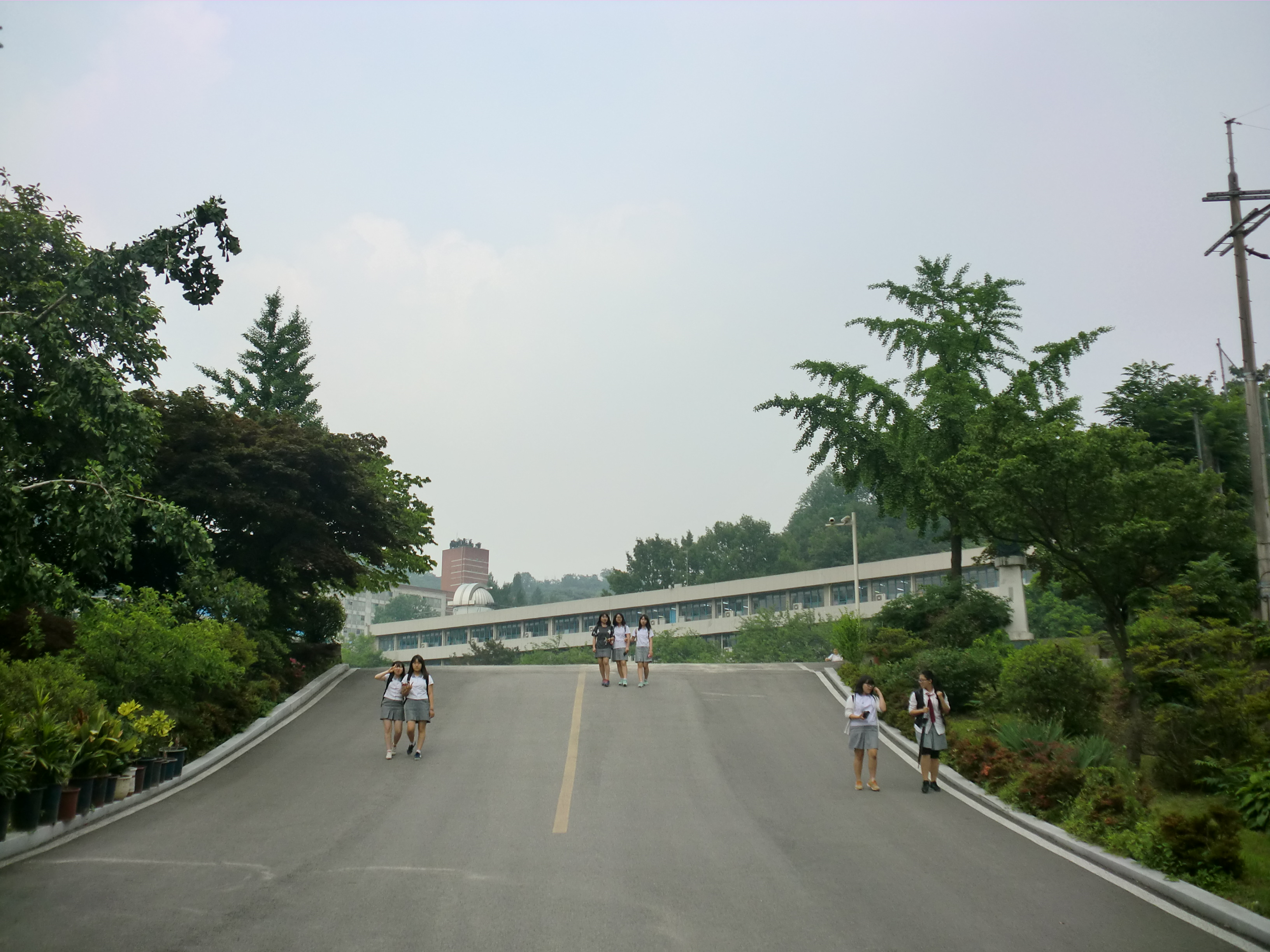
Seoul Overseas Chinese High School

- Seoul Chinese Primary School
- Seoul Overseas Chinese High School
- Yeongdeugpou Korea Chinese Primary School
- Overseas Chinese Elementary School Busan
- Overseas Chinese Middle and High School Busan
- Overseas Chinese Elementary School Daegu
- Overseas Chinese Middle and High School Daegu
- Overseas Chinese School Incheon
- Suwon Zhongzheng Chinese Elementary School
- Overseas Chinese Elementary School Uijongbu
- Wonju Chinese Elementary School
- Chungju Chinese Elementary School
- Onyang Chinese Elementary School
- Kunsan Chinese Elementary School

There are two South Korean international schools in the ROC:

- Taipei Korean Elementary School (타이페이한국학교)
- Kaohsiung Korea School (가오슝한국국제학교)

== See also ==
- Anti-Korean sentiment in Taiwan
- Chinese people in Korea
- Economy of South Korea
- Economy of Taiwan
- Foreign relations of South Korea
- Indo-Pacific strategy of South Korea
- Japan–South Korea–Taiwan relations
- Taiwan Economic Miracle
