= Shandong people =

People native to Shandong

Shandonese 山東人 山东人
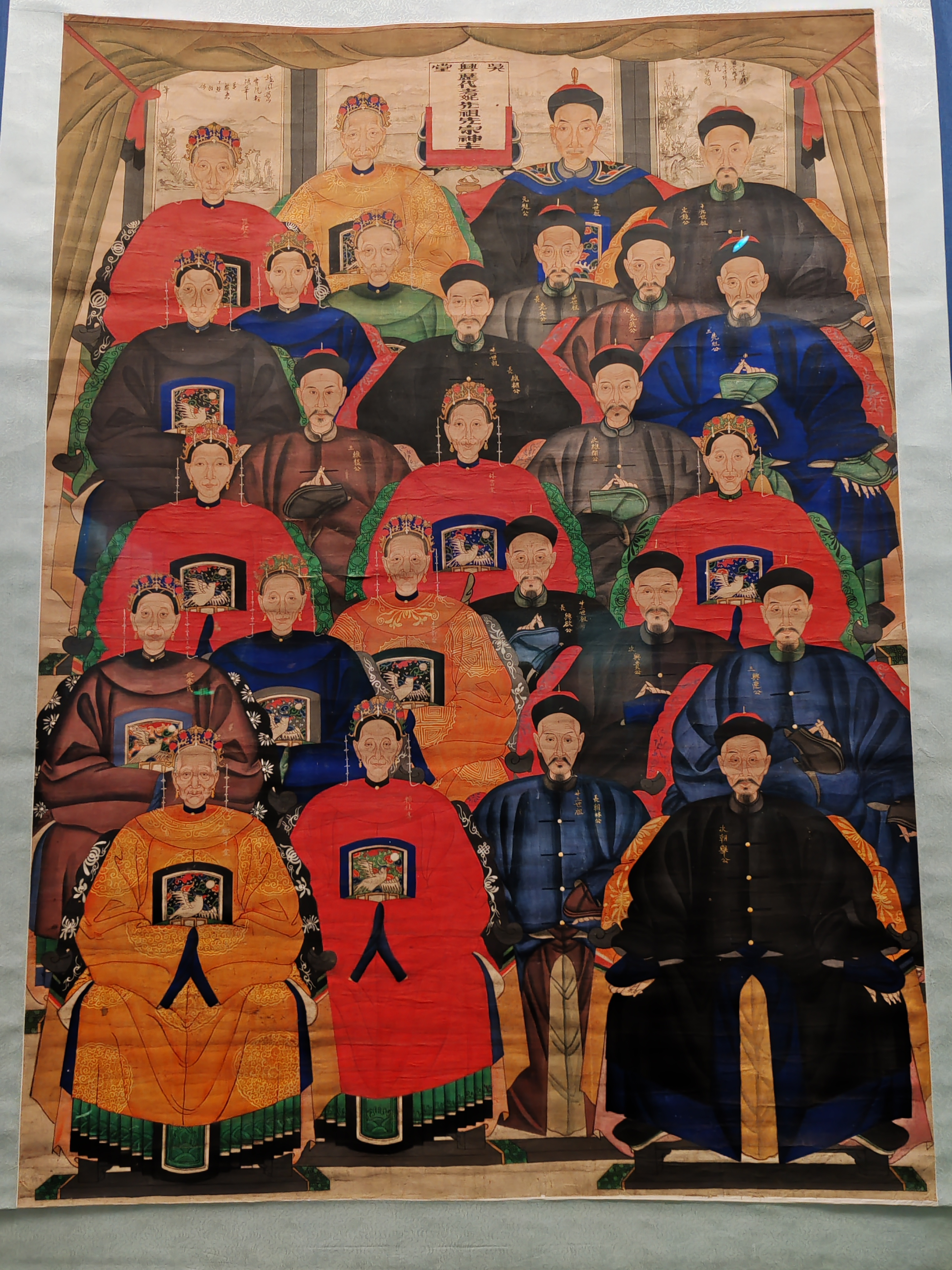
- Ancestral scroll showing grandfathers and grandmothers of a family of Changyi County, Weifang Prefecture, Shandong

Regions with significant populations
- China (Shandong, Northeast), Taiwan, Republic of Korea

Languages
- Various forms of Standard Chinese

Religion
- Ancestral worship, Taoism, Buddhism, Christianity, Atheism, etc.

The people of Shandong province, Shandonese or Shandong people (simplified Chinese: 山东人; traditional Chinese: 山東人; pinyin: Shāndōng rén) refers to those who are native to Shandong province, the majority (99%) are classified as Han Chinese. They speak mainly three forms of Mandarin dialects: Jilu, Jiaoliao, and Zhongyuan.

Originating from a coastal province in eastern China that was home to ancient states like Qi and Lu, Shandong is regarded as the cradle of Confucianism, being the birthplace of Confucius and Mencius and many other scholars. Historically, Shandongese have been prominent in national migration movements, especially the Chuang Guandong migration into Manchuria, and many also became part of overseas Chinese communities. They made up 10% of Mainlanders in Taiwan, 90% of oversea Chinese in South Korea, and there is also a small Shandong community in Singapore and Malaysia. Shandong people are often stereotyped as physically strong, loyal, and straightforward, with a reputation for perseverance and fortitude, shaped by centuries of agricultural labor and frequent hardships like war, famine, and flood. As of 2010, 16- to 18-year-old male students in Yantai measured 176.4 cm (5'9.5), while female students measured 164 cm (5'4.5). Provincial average for both genders would be about 1 cm less.

== History ==
Location of Shandong within China

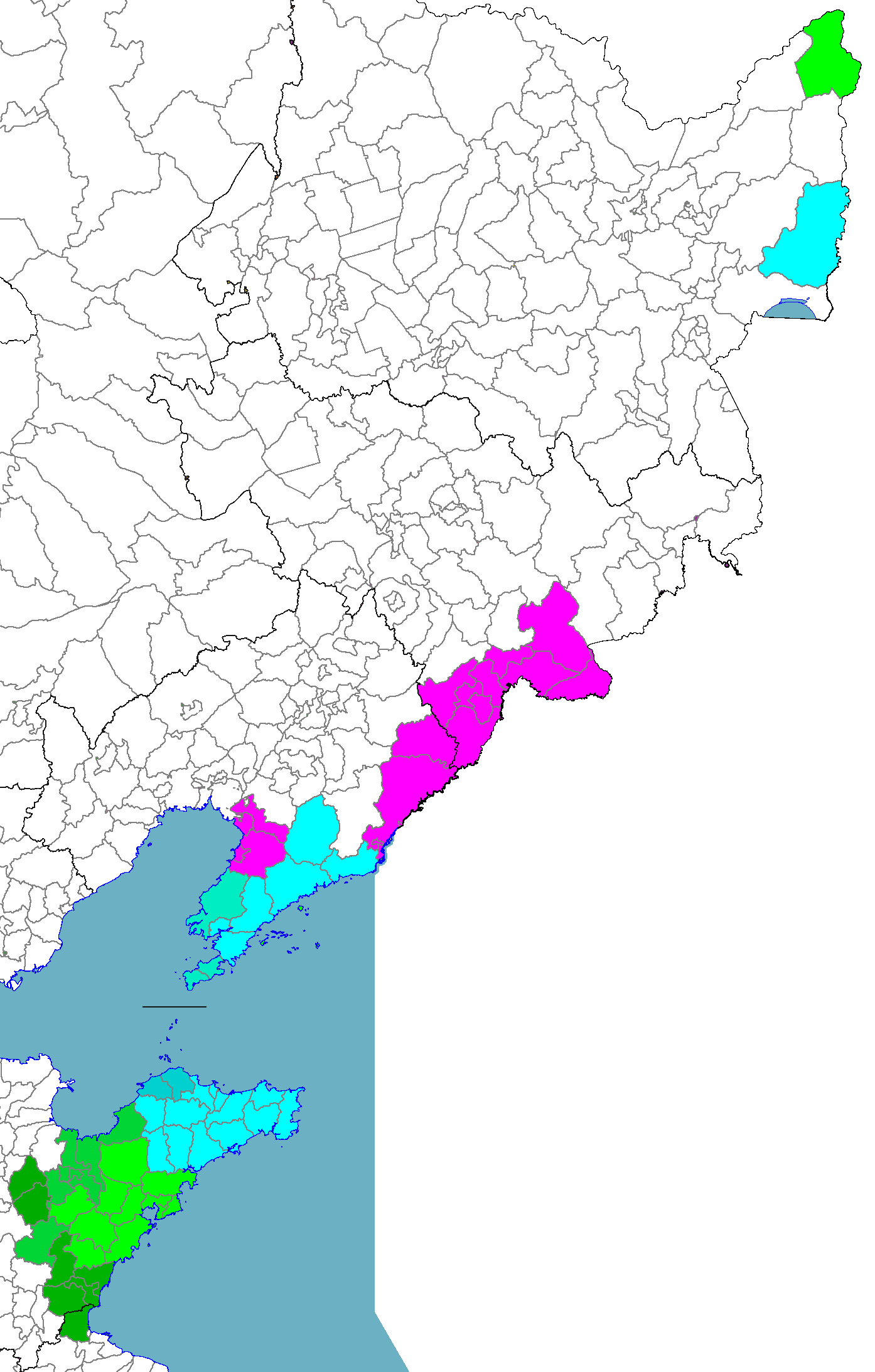
Distribution of Jiaoliao Mandarin, which shows the relations between Shandong and Liaodong Peninsula, as well as further Northeast

Modern-day Shandong is primarily located in the territories of Qi During the Warring States Period. It was the last annexed kingdom by the Qin kingdom before Qin dynasty. After 15 years, the unified Qin Empire was toppled by peasant revolts (Chen Sheng Wu Guang Uprising etc.) and then split into Eighteen Kingdoms. On present day Shandong's territories, 3 feudal states came into existence, Jiaodong (膠東), Jibei (濟北) and Qi (齊). After about 5 years (see Chu-Han Contention), the Han army led by King Liu Bang united those kingdoms and started Han dynasty.

After 400 years, the Han dynasty fell and the empire scattered and after the disintegration of the Cao Wei dynasty, the area of present-day Shandong was ruled by the Tuoba Clan of the Xianbei Tribe during the Eastern Wei. The Eastern Wei eventually fell to the Northern Qi dynasty which lasted 27 years before it was overtaken by the Northern Zhou of central China. Emperor Wen of Sui was able to recapture ruling power to the Han Chinese from the Xianbei and establish the Sui dynasty after centuries of Xianbei rule and division between different states, becoming Emperor Wen of Sui.

After unifying the Northern and Southern dynasties, the Sui dynasty paved the way for the Tang dynasty and many years of prosperity and peace. The Tang dynasty fell about 300 years after its inception. The empire again, fragmented, this time into many different states whose borders are roughly the outline of the present day provinces. During this time Shandong was known as the Later Liang (Five Dynasties) Kingdom.

Shandong people also played a central role in the Chuang Guandong (闖關東) migration, serving as one of the main source provinces for millions of Han Chinese who moved into Manchuria from the late Qing dynasty through the early 20th century. Driven by overpopulation, famine, and land scarcity, Shandong peasants sought better opportunities in the Northeast's vast, underdeveloped lands. Its proximity to the Shanhai Pass—the traditional gateway to Manchuria—made Shandong a natural starting point for this migration. Shandong migrants significantly shaped the cultural, linguistic, and agricultural landscape of Manchuria, and their legacy remains deeply embedded in northeastern Chinese identity today.

In Shandong cities throughout the 18th century, there were sizable foreign settlements by the British, Germans, Americans, and Russians. For 20 years prior to the end of World War I, the Germans controlled Shandong. After the defeat of Germany in WWI by the Allied forces, the cities of Chefoo and Qingdao were handed to the Japanese who used the port cities for their summer fleets. This led to the Shandong Problem which added to the ignition of the May Fourth Movement and the New Culture Movement— paving the way for the birth of modern China.

== Dialect ==
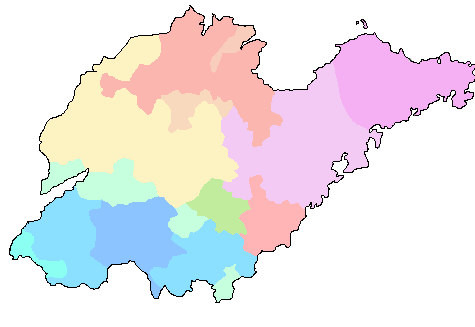
Dialect divisions of Shandong according to the Language Atlas of China Jiaoliao Mandarin – Denglian Cluster (Dengzhou, Dalian) Jiaoliao Mandarin – Qingzhou Cluster (Qingzhou) Jilu Mandarin (influenced by Jiaoliao Mandarin) Jilu Mandarin – Zhangli Cluster (Zhangqiu, Lijin) Jilu Mandarin Jilu Mandarin (influenced by Zhongyuan Mandarin) Zhongyuan Mandarin (influenced by Jilu Mandarin) Zhongyuan Mandarin – Luoxu Cluster (Luoyang, Xuzhou) Zhongyuan Mandarin – Zhengcao Cluster (Zhengzhou, Caozhou) Zhongyuan Mandarin – Cailu Cluster (Xincai, Qufu)

Shandong dialects generally refer to the varieties of Chinese spoken within Shandong Province. The three main dialect groups used in the region all belong to the Mandarin branch of Chinese and are primarily divided into: Jilu Mandarin, spoken in the northwest of Shandong, Zhongyuan Mandarin in the southwest, and Jiaoliao Mandarin on the Jiaodong Peninsula. These dialects differ in various aspects, including pronunciation, vocabulary, and grammar. In neighboring regions such as the Liaodong Peninsula and northern Jiangsu Province—where Jiaoliao Mandarin and Zhongyuan Mandarin are also spoken—local dialects are sometimes referred to by Shandong people as "Shandong dialects" as well.

== Cuisine ==
Shandong cuisine is one of the Eight Great Regional Cuisines" of China. It is noted for uses of fresh seafood, soy sauce, and spices (e.g., garlic, scallion).

Vast fertile plain enabled Shandong to be a major wheat-production zone in China, so many Shandong people enjoy wheat-based food. There is a stereotype that Shandong people like to eat giant Mantou (for the entire Shandong) or Jianbing (Jiaodong excluded).

There are 2 main variants of Shandong cuisine with vast differences: the coastal style (normally referring to Jiaodong) and the inland style (except for Jiaodong).

Inland-styled dishes are generally salty, with a prevalence of light-colored sauces, and renowned for its adept skills in slicing. Meanwhile, coastal-styled dishes are known for being fresh, tender (describing meat and seafood) and mellow.

Both styles of Shandong cuisine are representative among all Northern Chinese cooking styles and its techniques have been widely absorbed by imperial cuisine styles (e.g., Peking Duck).

Notable dishes are:

- Dezhou Braised (Grilled) Chicken (德州扒鸡; Dézhōu pá jī) also known as "Dezhou Five-fragrant Boneless Braised Chicken" from the city of Dezhou.
- Clay Pot Braised Pork Belly (坛子肉; tánzi ròu) the original Red braised pork belly which has now spread all over China, and is more popularly known as Chairman Mao's favorite dish. Different provinces have different variations of this dish. Tanzi Rou, literally means brewed pork in jar, as the dish is cooked in a porcelain or clay pot. It is said that the dish originated in the Jinan Fengjilou Hotel.
- Eight Immortal Soup (蓬莱八仙宴) a seafood stew popular among Shandong easterners (胶东人) and their settlements abroad.
- Fluffy Scallion Pan-Cake (山东葱花饼) is a version of a scallion pancake that is much more dense, fluffier, and thicker than the more widespread southern style, Green-Scallion Oil Pancake. This type of bread can come either plain topped with sesame seeds, or stuffed with meat filling or glass-noodle or eggs and Chinese chives. Different variations exist.
- Shandong Fried Oyster (炒生蚝)
- Braised Sea Cucumber with Scallion (葱烧海参)
- Pulled-Caramelized Sweet Potato (拔丝地瓜; básī dìguā)
- Shandong Dumplings Shandong style dumplings are notably plumper and traditionally made with Pork & Cabbage (common style) or Mackerel & Leek (Jiaodong style). Shandong dumplings typically have hearty fillings, bringing people with a great sense of satisfaction.

== Culture ==
Evidence of the Beixin culture (5300 BC to 4100 BC), the Dawenkou culture (4100 BC to 2600 BC) and the Longshan Culture (3000 BC to 2000 BC) was found in Shandong province, which provides evidence that comparatively advanced handcraft industry, agriculture and animal husbandry was prevalent in Shandong 4000 to 7000 years ago.

Additionally, Shandong is home to some of the oldest Chinese inscriptions: Dawenkou Pottery Inscription and Longshan Pottery Inscription; the largest prehistoric settlement found to date: Chengziya (城子崖) Archeological Site; the oldest section of the Great Wall in China: the Great Wall of Qi State; Huantai County oracle bone script, among the oldest found in China, were all found in Shandong. According to the research of archaeologists, Shandong was the main hub for silk manufacture from the Han dynasty to the Tang dynasty, and it was the start of the ancient Silk Road.

Heritage sites

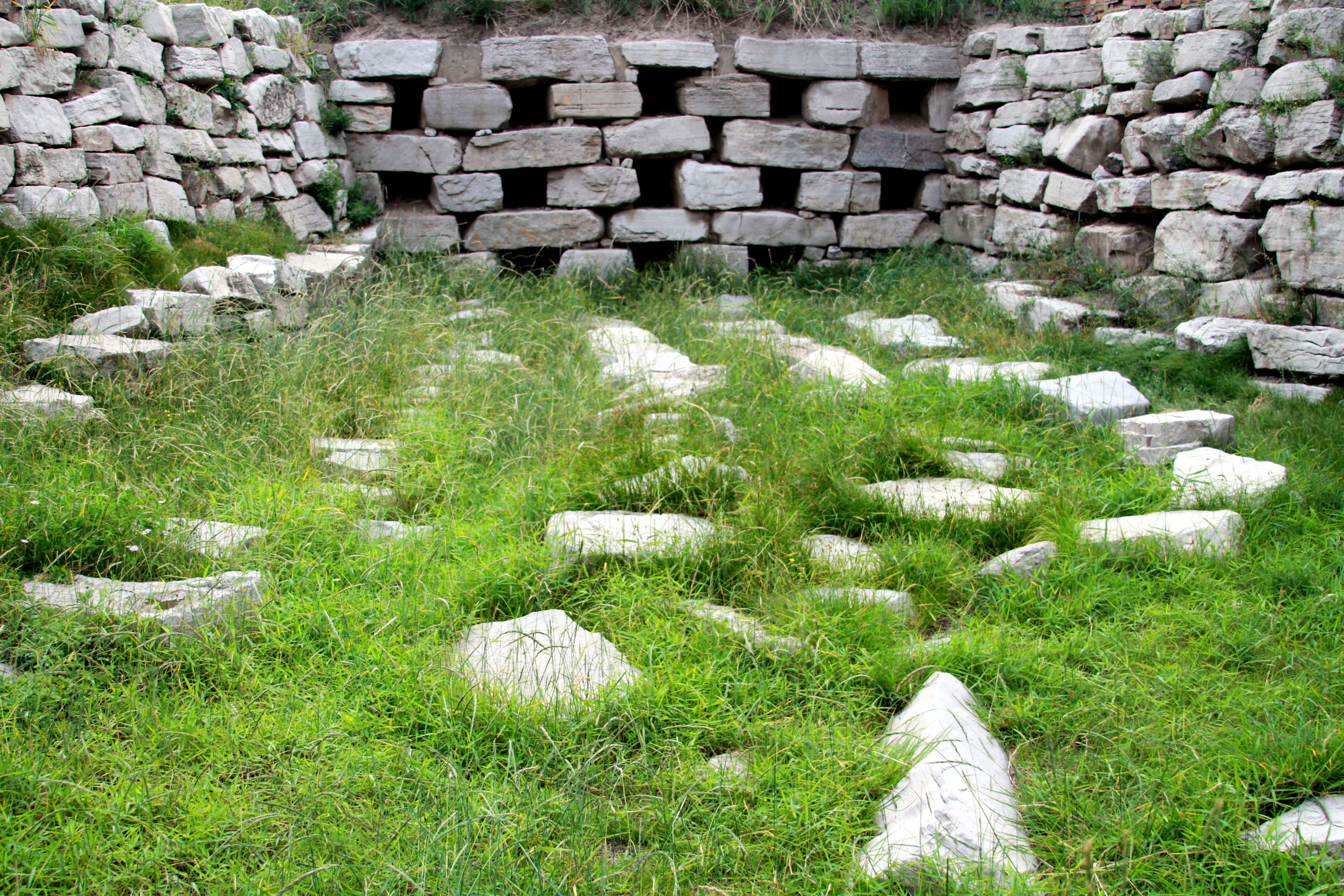
Remains of Ancient Linzi city drainage underneath the former rampart.

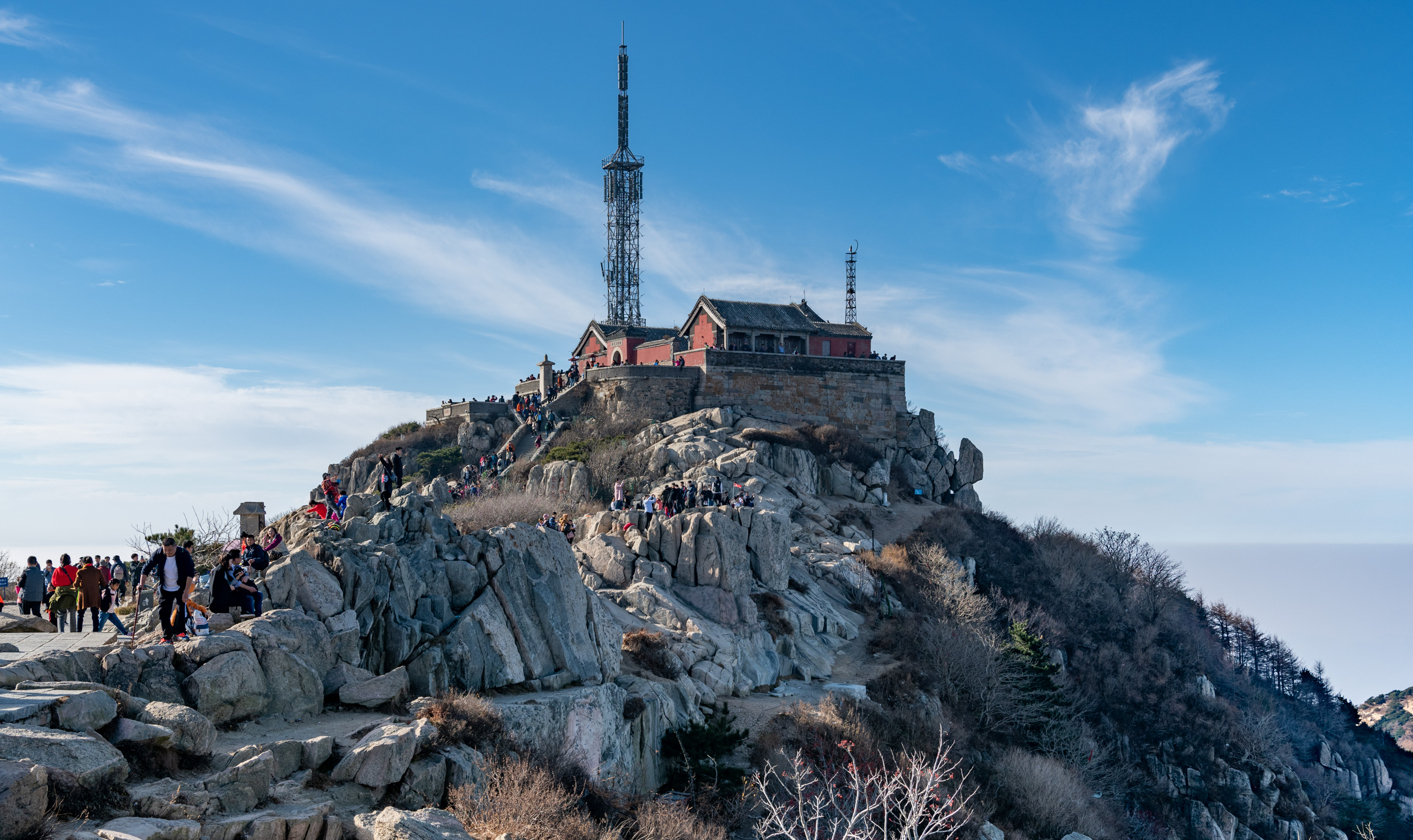
Mount Tai in Daiyue, Tai'an.

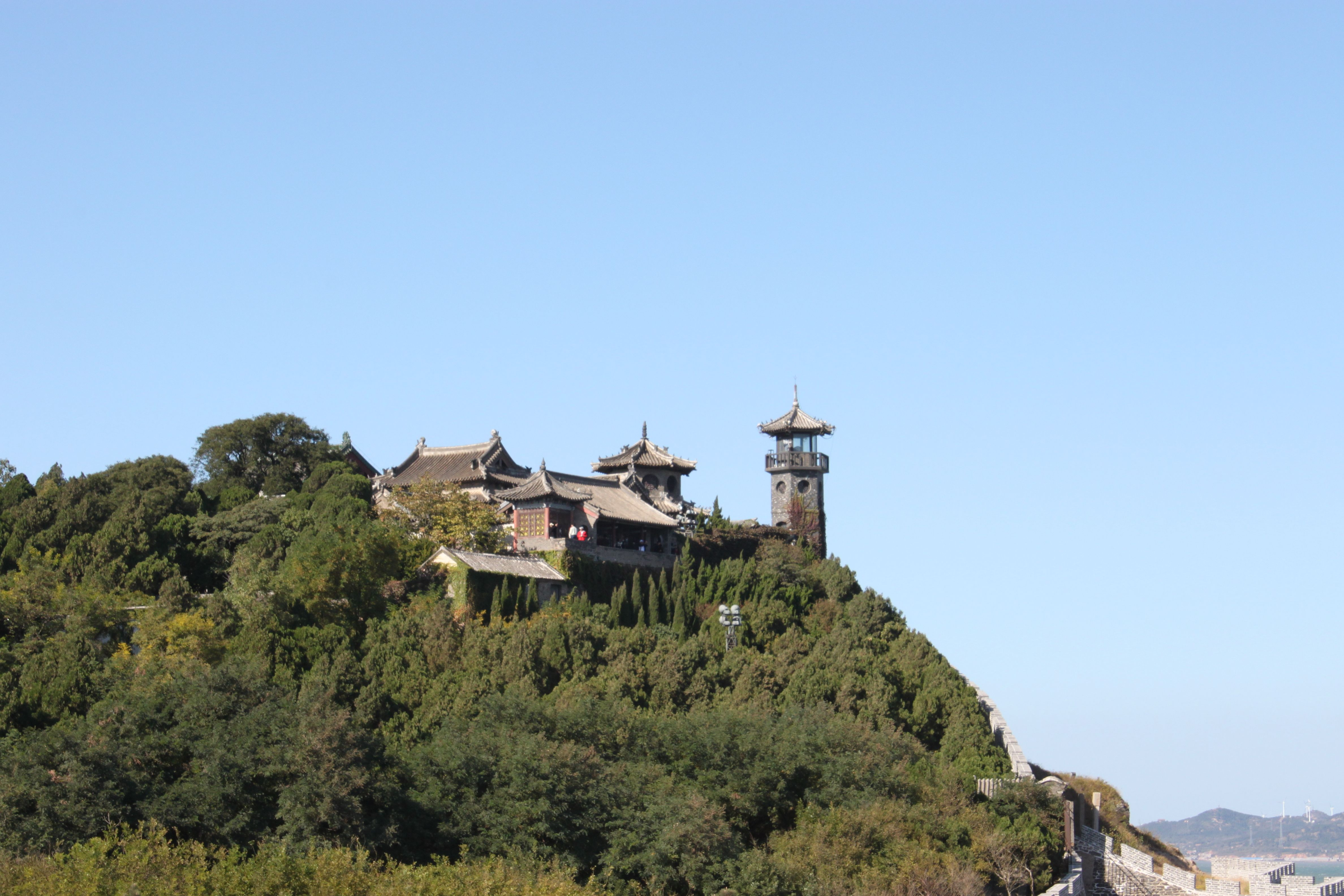
Penglai Pavilion in Penglai, Yantai.

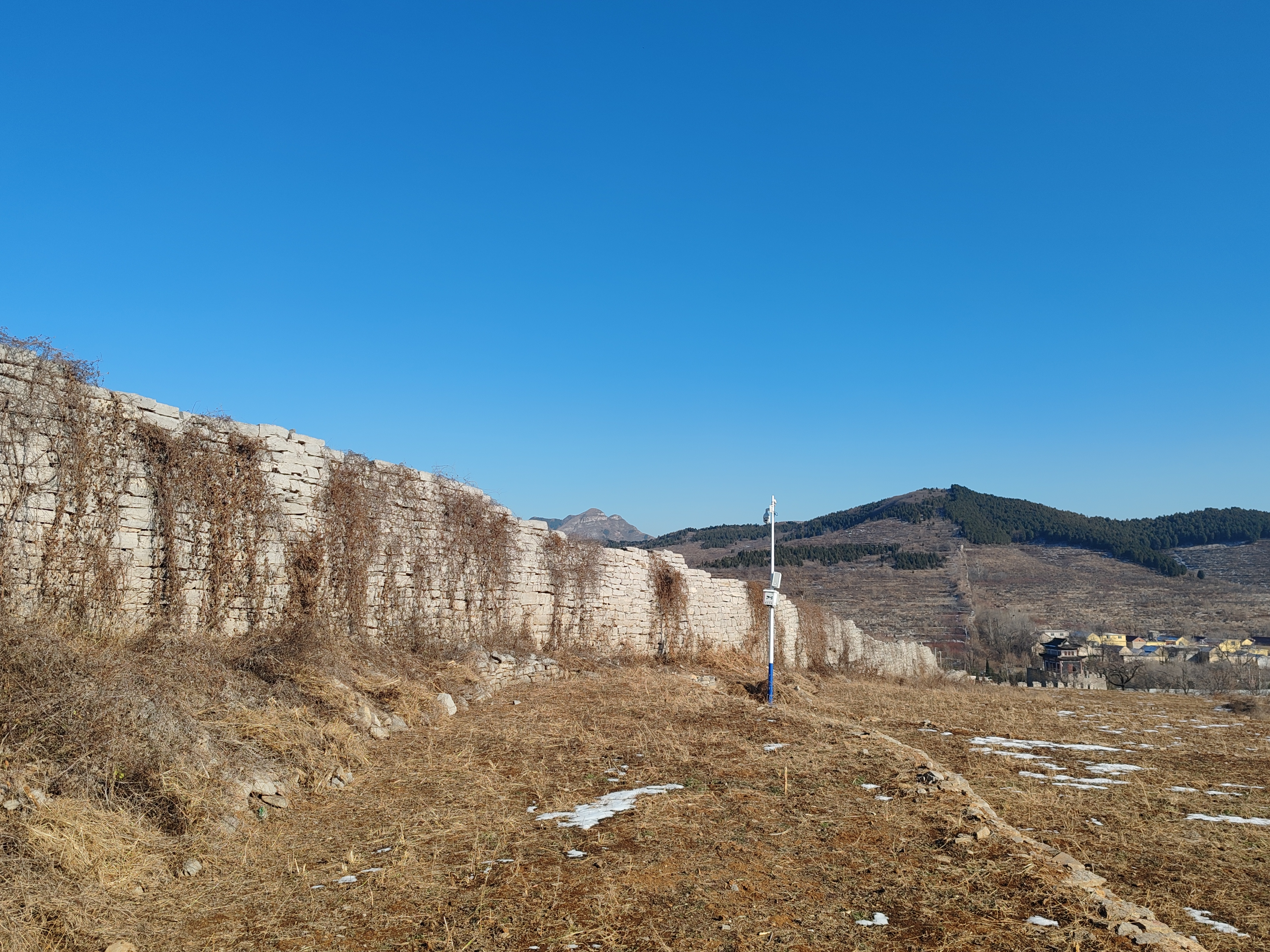
Remnants of the Great Wall of Qi in Laiwu, Jinan.

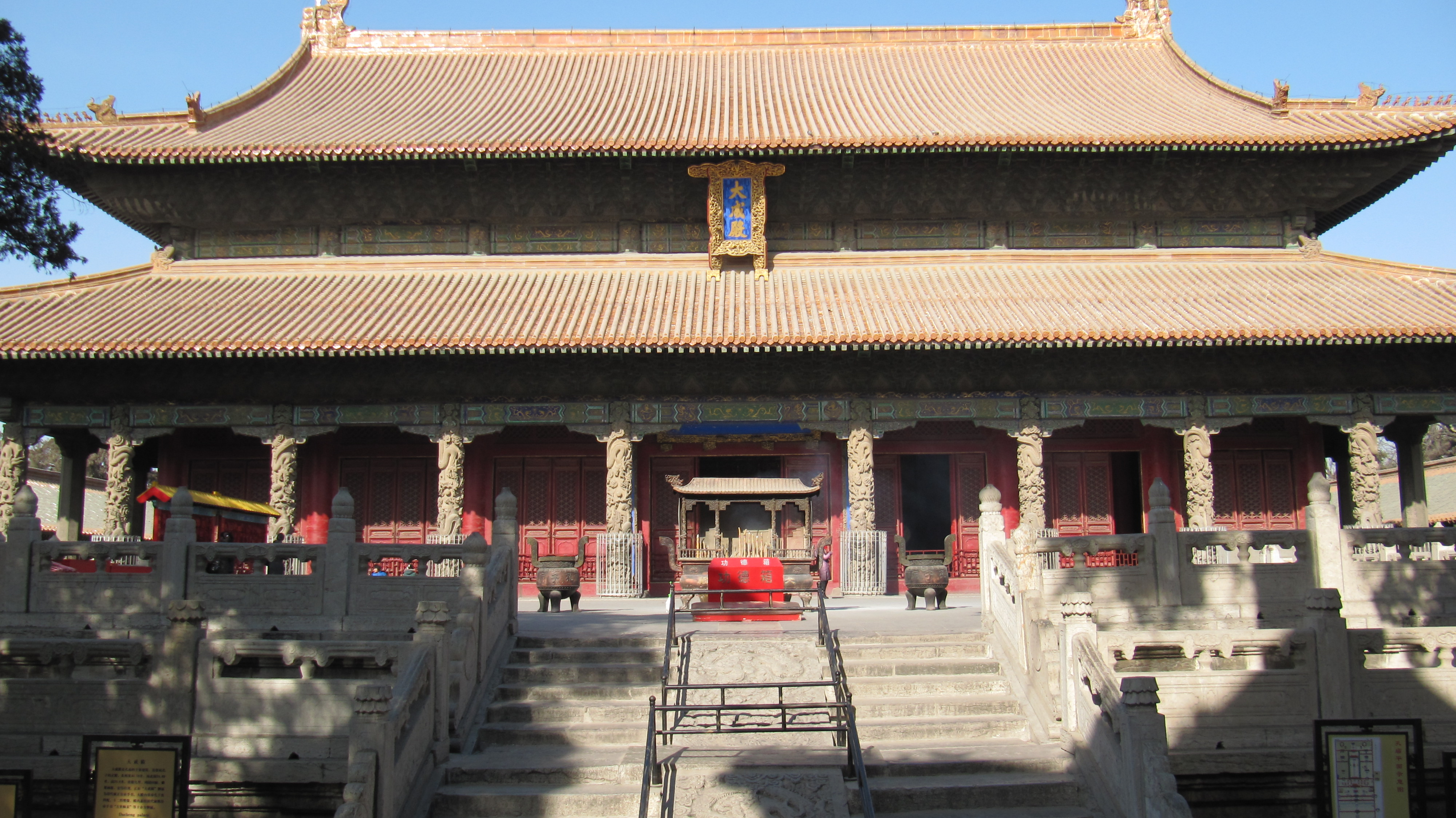
Temple of Confucius in Qufu, Jining

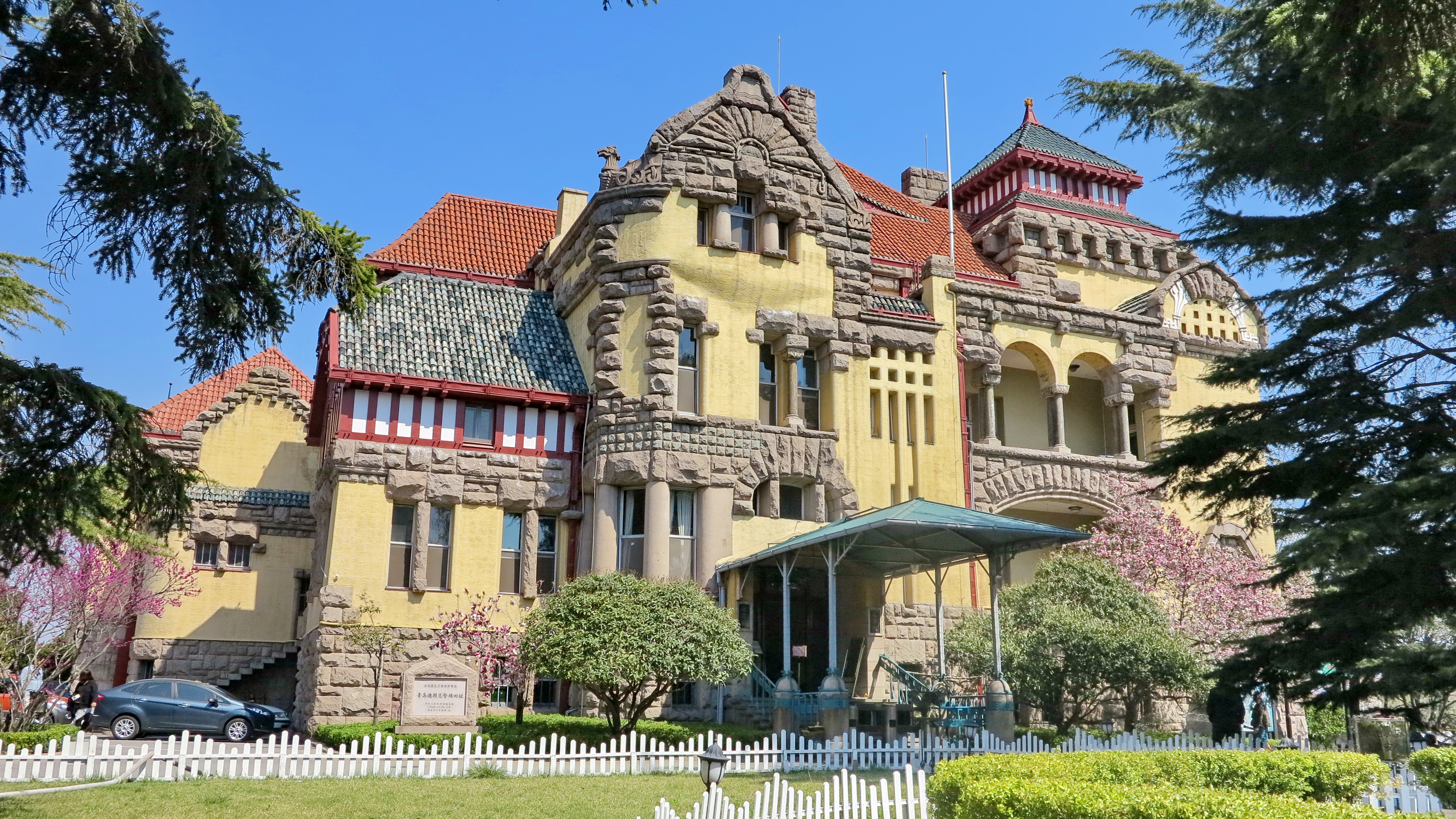
Former Kiautschou Governor's Residence in Shinan, Qingdao

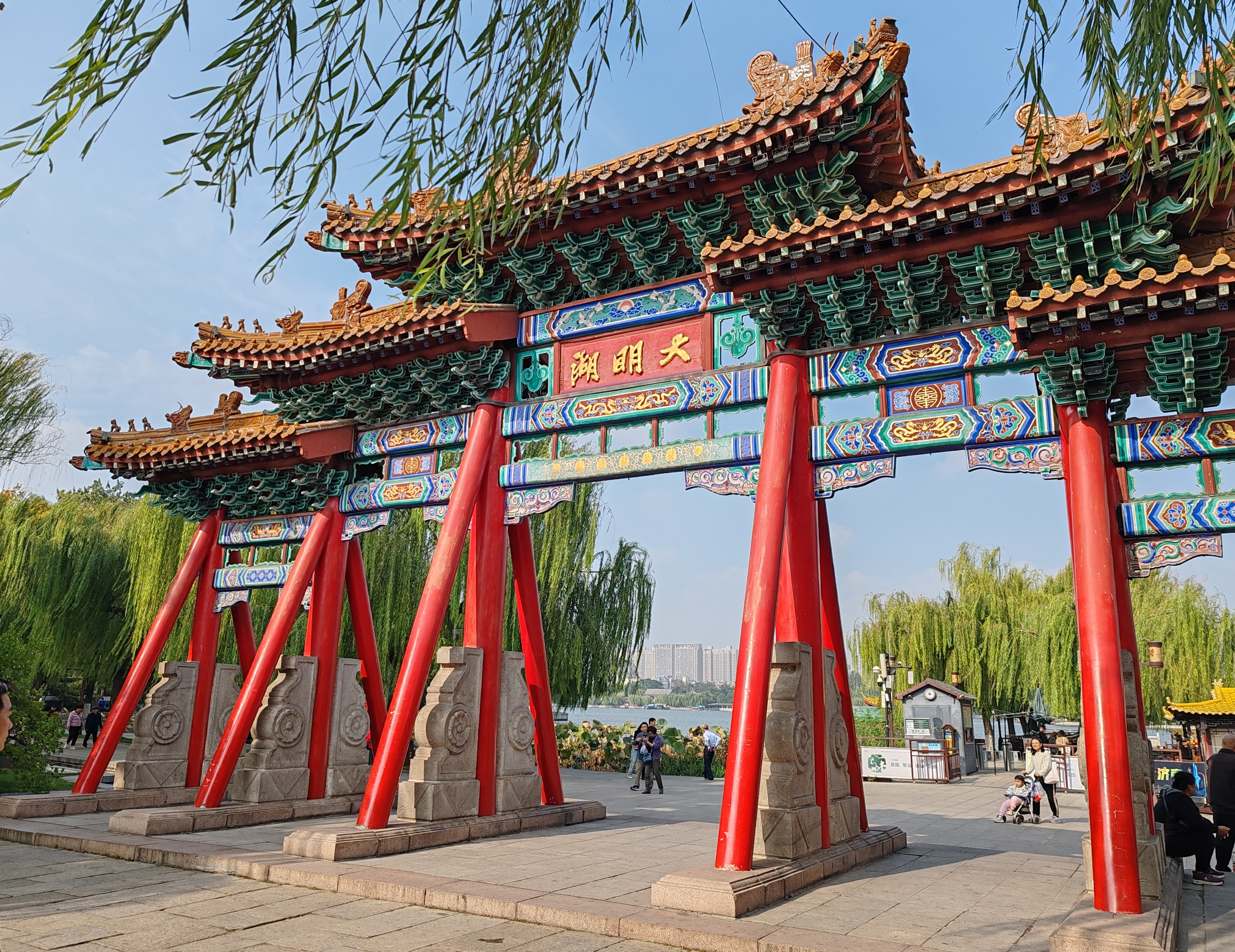
Daming Lake in Lixia, Jinan

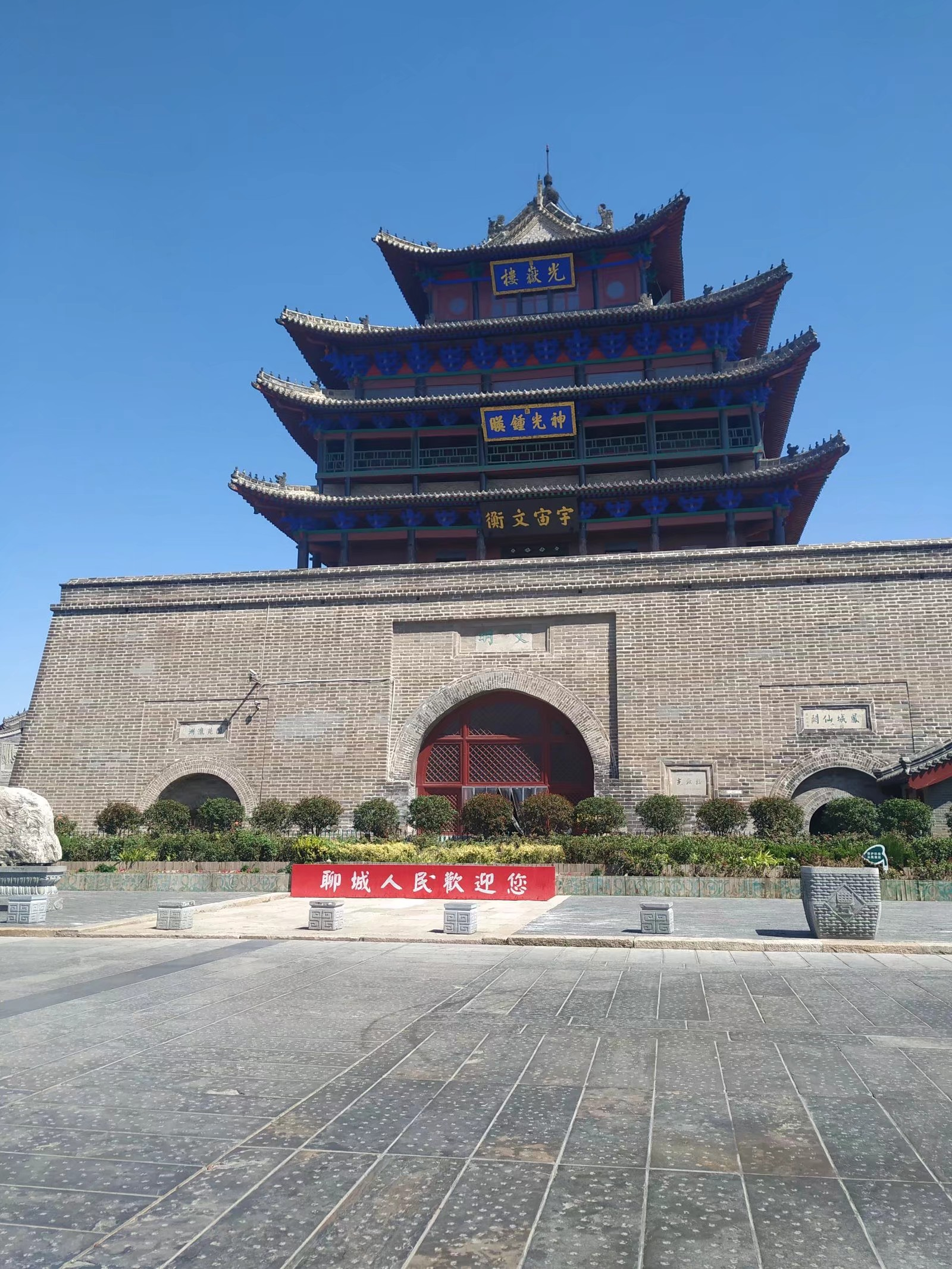
Guangyue Tower in Dongchangfu, Liaocheng

== Chinese-Korean clans from Shandong ==
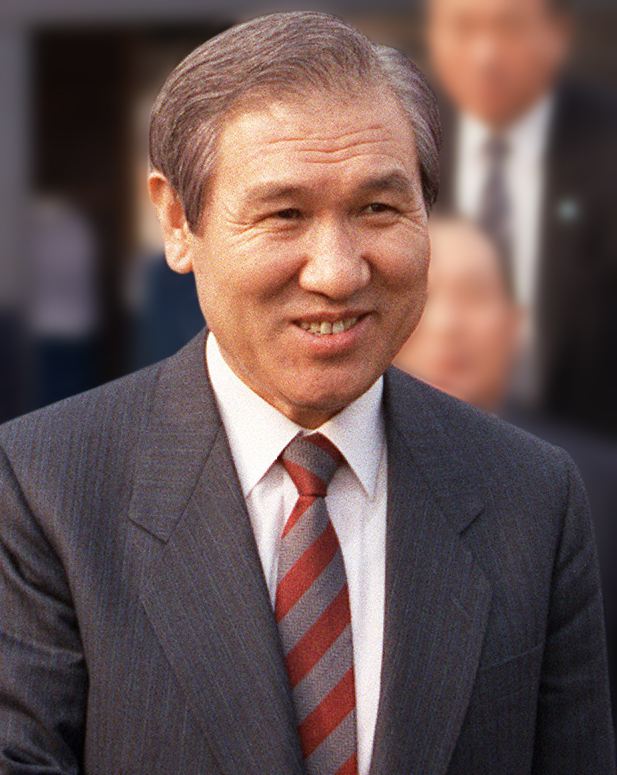
Korean president Roh Tae-woo's family, the Gyoha No (Lu) clan (交河盧氏), originated in Shandong. In 2000, he paid a visit to Changqing, Jinan where the Lu family line began.

Due to their proximity, interactions between Korea and Shandong Peninsula are frequent. Some Korean clans trace their origins to Shandong, China, because their founding ancestors were Chinese immigrants who settled in Korea during various historical periods, such as the Tang, Song, Yuan, or Ming dynasties. These immigrants, often scholars, officials, or soldiers, were naturalized in Korea and established family lines. In Korean tradition, a clan's bon-gwan (origin place) reflects the ancestral hometown of its founder, not necessarily where descendants currently live. Therefore, clans like the Cheongju Jeong (靑州 鄭氏) or Laiyang Hwang (萊陽 黃氏) derive their bon-gwan from cities in Shandong such as Qingzhou or Laiyang. Moreover, as for today's Chinese people in Korea, 90% of them are from Shandong.

- Chungju Ji clan
- Chungju Mae clan
- Ganghwa Noh clan
- Geumseong Beom clan
- Haengju Ki clan
- Haman Jo clan
- Langya Jeong clan
- Jinan Wang clan
- Imgu Pung clan
- Namyang Bang clan
- Namyang Hong clan
- Namyang Seo clan
- Gokbu Gong clan – descendant of 53rd grandchild of Confucius, Kong Shao
- Sinchang Maeng clan – descendant of 39th grandchild of Mencius, Meng Cheng Shun
- Yeoheung Min clan
- Yeongyang Cheon clan
- Yangsan Jin clan

== Notable people ==
=== Academia ===
- Liu Hui – ancient Chinese mathematician
- Jiao Bingzhen – a noted astronomer and artist
- Ke Ting Sui – known for the Kê pendulum and Kê grain-boundary internal friction peak he invented
- Li Zhensheng – geneticist of wheat
- Guo Yonghuai – Chinese expert in aerodynamics
- Samuel C. C. Ting – Nobel Prize in Physics laureate
- Zhan Tao – Chinese mathematician and president of Jilin University.
- Qu Qinyue – astrophysicist and president of Nanjing University.

=== Philosophers ===
- Shandong Philosophers
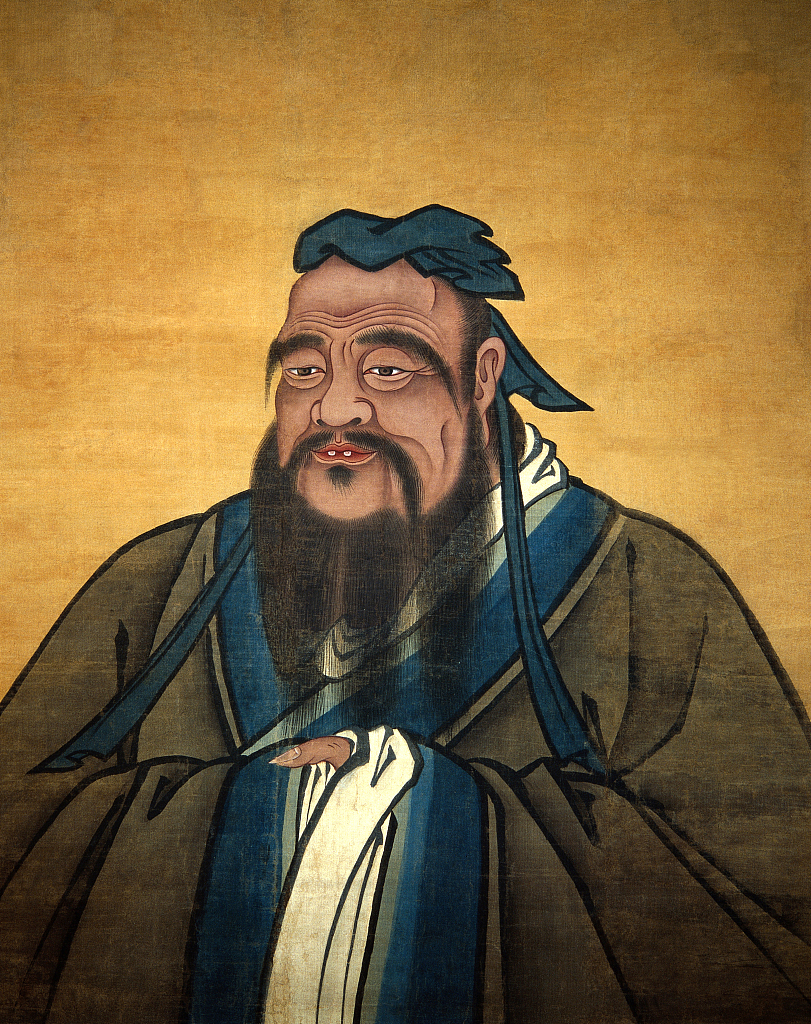
  Confucius
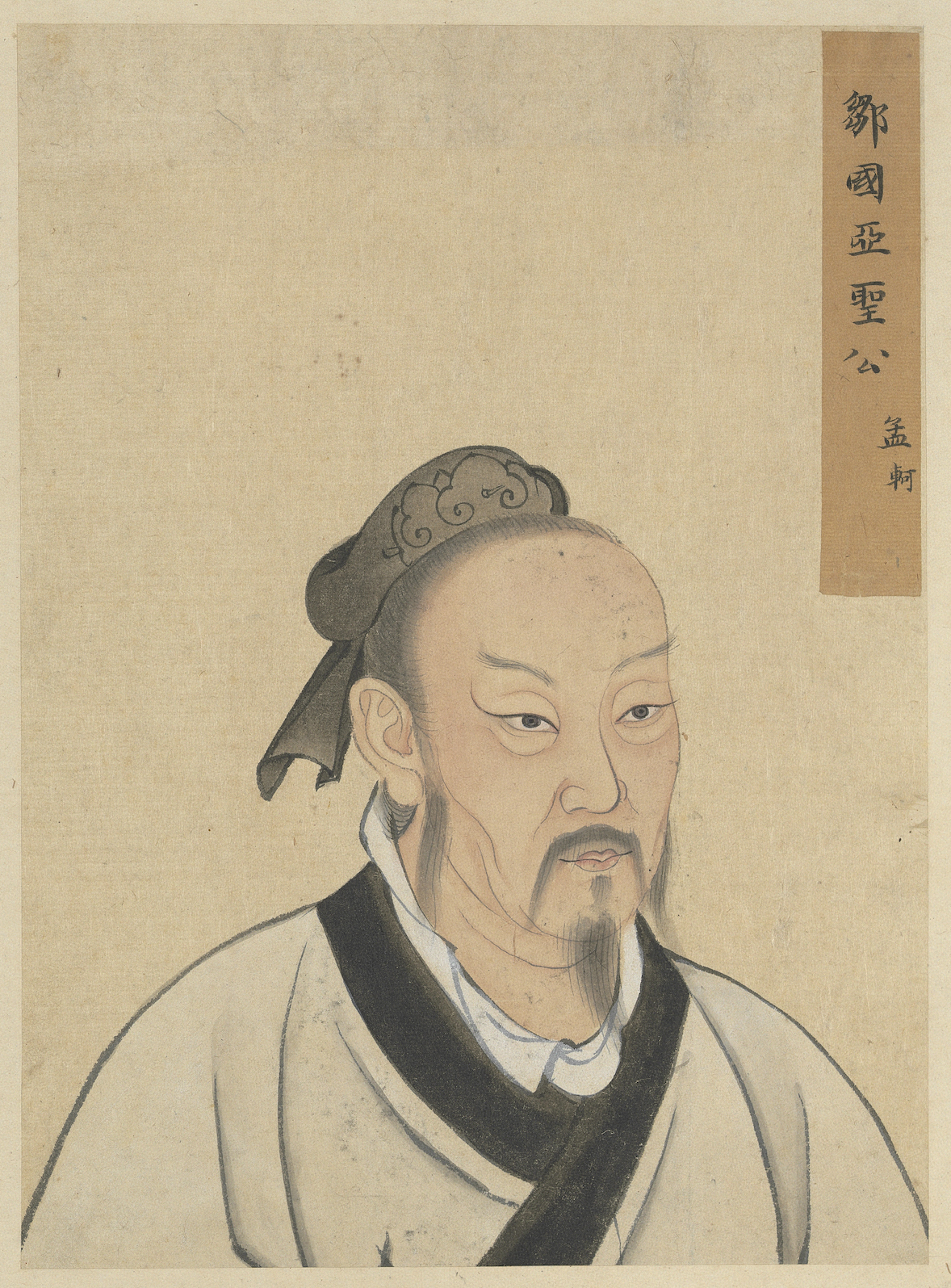
  Mencius
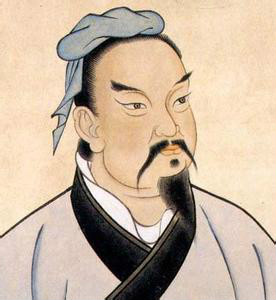
  Sun tzu
  Confucius – considered to be the greatest Chinese philosopher, founder of Confucianism and contributed greatly to Chinese culture
- Mozi – founder of Mohism
- Disciples of Confucius – helped to compile much of the teachings of the greatest Chinese philosopher and their teacher, Confucius, in the Analects of Confucius
- Mencius – the most famous Confucian after Confucius himself, responsible for propagating Confucianism
- Zengzi – one of the Four Sages or Confucianism, composed Classic of Filial Piety
- Zou Yan – best known as the representative thinker of the Yin and Yang School (or School of Naturalists) during the Hundred Schools of Thought era in Chinese philosophy.
- Duanmu Ci
- Zheng Xuan
- Linji Yixuan
- Mou Zongsan

=== Literati ===
- Shandong Writers
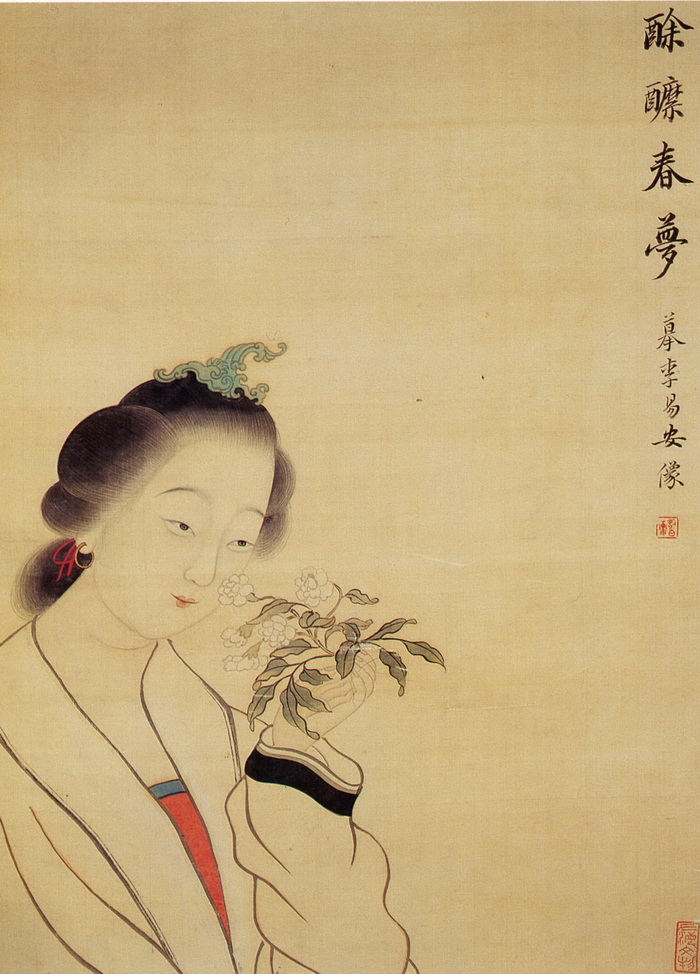
  Li Qingzhao
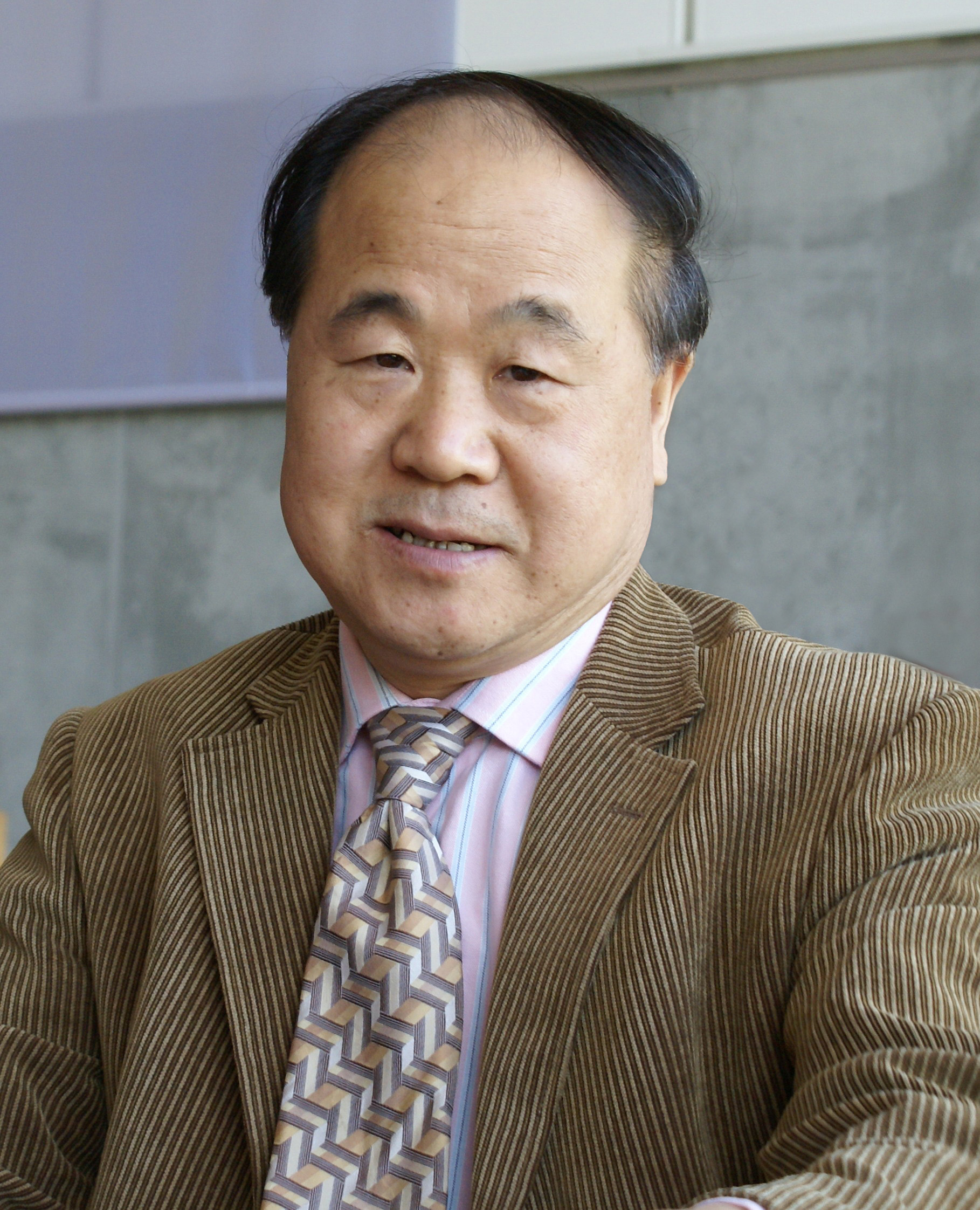
  Mo Yan
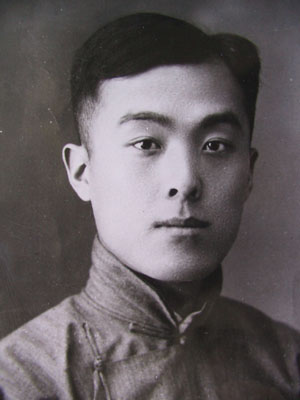
  Ji Xianlin
  Alfred James Broomhall – author and historian
- Deng Guangming – 20th century historian
- Han Xizai – official of states Wu (Ten Kingdoms) and Southern Tang, famed for his writing and calligraphy skills.
- Li Baojia – Qing dynasty author
- Li Cunxin – author of Mao's Last Dancer
- Mo Yan – Nobel Prize in Literature laureate
- Nicholas Poppe – linguist
- Peter Stursberg – Canadian writer, broadcaster, and war correspondent
- Pu Songling – Qing dynasty writer, author of Strange Stories from a Chinese Studio
- Qu Bo – 20th century author
- Yan Chongnian – historian
- Yan Zhen – calligrapher
- Zuo Fen – female poet during the Western Jin dynasty

=== Entertainers ===
- Gong Li – actress
- Fan Bing Bing – actress
- Zhang Yuqi – actress
- Wang Yan – actress
- Hachidai Nakamura – jazz pianist and songwriter
- Huang Xiaoming – actor
- Huang Bo – actor
- Huang Zitao – actor, singer, former Exo (band) member and idol
- Victoria Song – actress, F(x) (band) leader
- Toshiro Mifune – actor
- Jin Chen – actress
- Gina Jin – actress
- Ren Jia Lun – actor
- Bai Baihe – actress
- Chen Hao – actress
- Ma Tianyu – actor
- Zhang Zilin – Miss World 2007
- Teresa Teng – pop Icon
- Dee Hsu – TV host in Taiwan
- Show Luo – Taiwanese entertainer (father)
- Eddie Huang – Taiwanese American lawyer, author, and restaurateur (mother)
- Fei Fei Sun – super model, face of Estee Lauder, first model of Asian descent to represent Valentino and grace the cover of Vogue Italy
- Kara Hui – Hong Kong actress of Manchu ethnicity
- Wei Zheming (Miles Wei) – actor, singer, model
- Eric Wang – singer of Australian hardcore punk band BOZO

=== Athletes ===
- Gao Yisheng – 20th century martial arts master, founder of Gao Style Baguazhang
- Sun Wengjin – Chinese women's volleyball player
- Wang Bo – martial artist
- Xu Jing – Chinese women's Olympic archer
- Yan Bingtao – youngest player to win Amateur World Snooker Championship, professional pool player
- Zhang Chenglong – 2012 Olympic gold medal gymnast
- Zhang Qibin – swimmer in 2016 Olympics
- Zhang Zhiqiang – Chinese rugby player, former Leicester Tigers member

=== Statesmen ===
- Shandong Statesmen
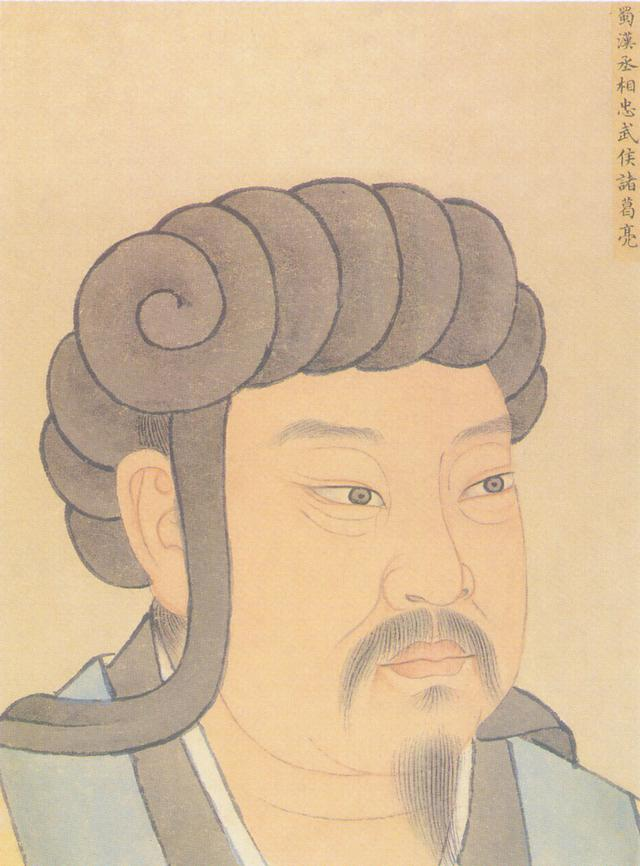
  Zhuge Liang
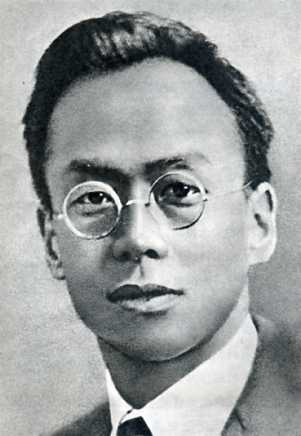
  Kang Sheng
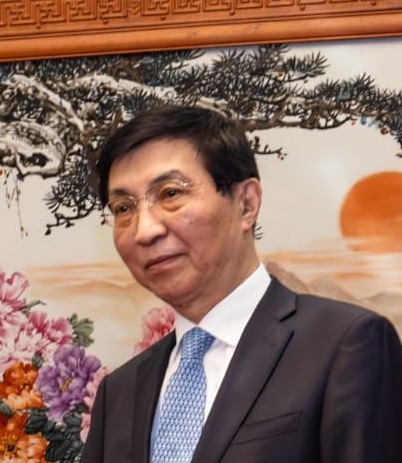
  Wang Huning
  Liu Yao – governor and warlord during the Eastern Han dynasty
- Empress Dowager Bian – wife of Cao Cao famed Three Kingdoms Warlord, mother of Cao Pi who ended the Eastern Han dynasty began the Wei dynasty.
- Lord Mengchang – aristocrat and statesman of the Qi Kingdom, one of the famed Four Lords of the Warring States period.
- Empress Lü – infamous wife of the first emperor of Han dynasty
- Peng Liyuan – contemporary folk singer, president of the People's Liberation Army Academy of Art, and First Lady of China
- Qi Jiguang – military general of the Ming dynasty, author of military manuals Jixiao Xinshu and Record of Military Training
- Queen Dowager Shi – a concubine of the late-Tang dynasty warlord Yang Xingmi
- Qu Tongfeng – general in the Beiyang Army during the Warlord era under Yuan Shikai
- Zhuge Liang – imperial chancellor, inventor and engineer, legalist (Chinese Philosophy), accomplished strategist in Chinese history during the Three Kingdoms period
- Wan Li – 5th Chairman of the Standing Committee of the National People's Congress. A Chinese Communist revolutionary and one of the leading moderate reformers in China's top leadership in the 1980s. In office 13 April 1988 – 27 March 1993.
- Jiang Qing, prominent political figure of PRC, and wife of Mao Zedong
- Chief Leung Chun-ying (ancestry in Rongcheng): Chief Executive of Hong Kong

=== Businesspeople ===
- Chen Xiaolu – early director of Anbang insurance giant
- Dr. Chiang Chen – entrepreneur and Hong Kong industrialist, founder of Chen Hsong Holdings Limited
- Guo Wengui – Chinese billionaire
- Kai Johan Jiang – Swedish-Chinese businessman in energy
- Karl Juchheim – German confectioner, founder of Juchheim Company
- Henry Luce – 20th century American magazine magnate
- Ning Gaoning – chairman of Sinochem Group
- Ren Zhiqiang – real estate tycoon
- Xiao Jianhua – Chinese-Canadian billionaire
- Xu Lejiang – billionaire
- Wang Tianpu – former Sinopec president
- Zhang Shiping – billionaire
- Zhang Ruimin – CEO of Haier Group
- Eric Yuan – billionaire, founder of Zoom

== Bibliography ==
- Tan, Chee-Beng (2004), Chinese Overseas: Comparative Cultural Issues, Hong Kong University Press, ISBN 978-962-209-662-2
- Rhee, Young-ju (2009), "Diversity within Chinese Diaspora: "Old" versus "New" huaqiao Residents in South Korea", in Fernandez, Jane (ed.), Diasporas: Critical and Interdisciplinary Perspectives (PDF), Oxford, United Kingdom: Inter-Disciplinary Press, pp. 111–126, ISBN 978-1-904710-68-4
