= Wang Bo =

Wang Bo is the name of:

- Bora Vang (born 1987), Chinese-born Turkish table tennis player, born Wang Bo
- Wang Bo (chancellor) (759–830), Tang dynasty chief minister
- Wang Bo (football manager), Chinese footballer
- Wang Bo (footballer, born 1982), Chinese footballer
- Wang Bo (footballer, born 1985), Chinese footballer
- Wang Bo (martial artist) (born 1989), Chinese-American martial artist
- Wang Bo (poet) (649–676), Tang dynasty poet
- Wang Bo (politician), Chinese politician from Inner Mongolia

== See also ==
- Wang Pu (disambiguation)
