= Ninoshima =

Island in Hiroshima Prefecture, Japan

Native name: 似島
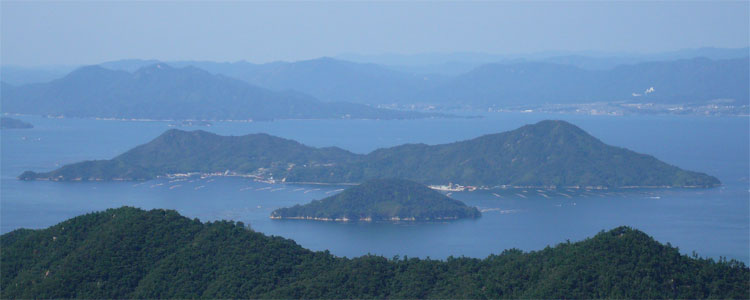
- Ninoshima

- Location within Japan

Geography
- Location: Seto Inland Sea
- Coordinates: 34°18′00″N 132°26′00″E
- Area: 3.87 km^{2} (1.49 sq mi)
- Highest elevation: 278 m (912 ft)
- Highest point: Aki-no-Kofuji

Administration
- Japan

Demographics
- Population: 1168 (2006)

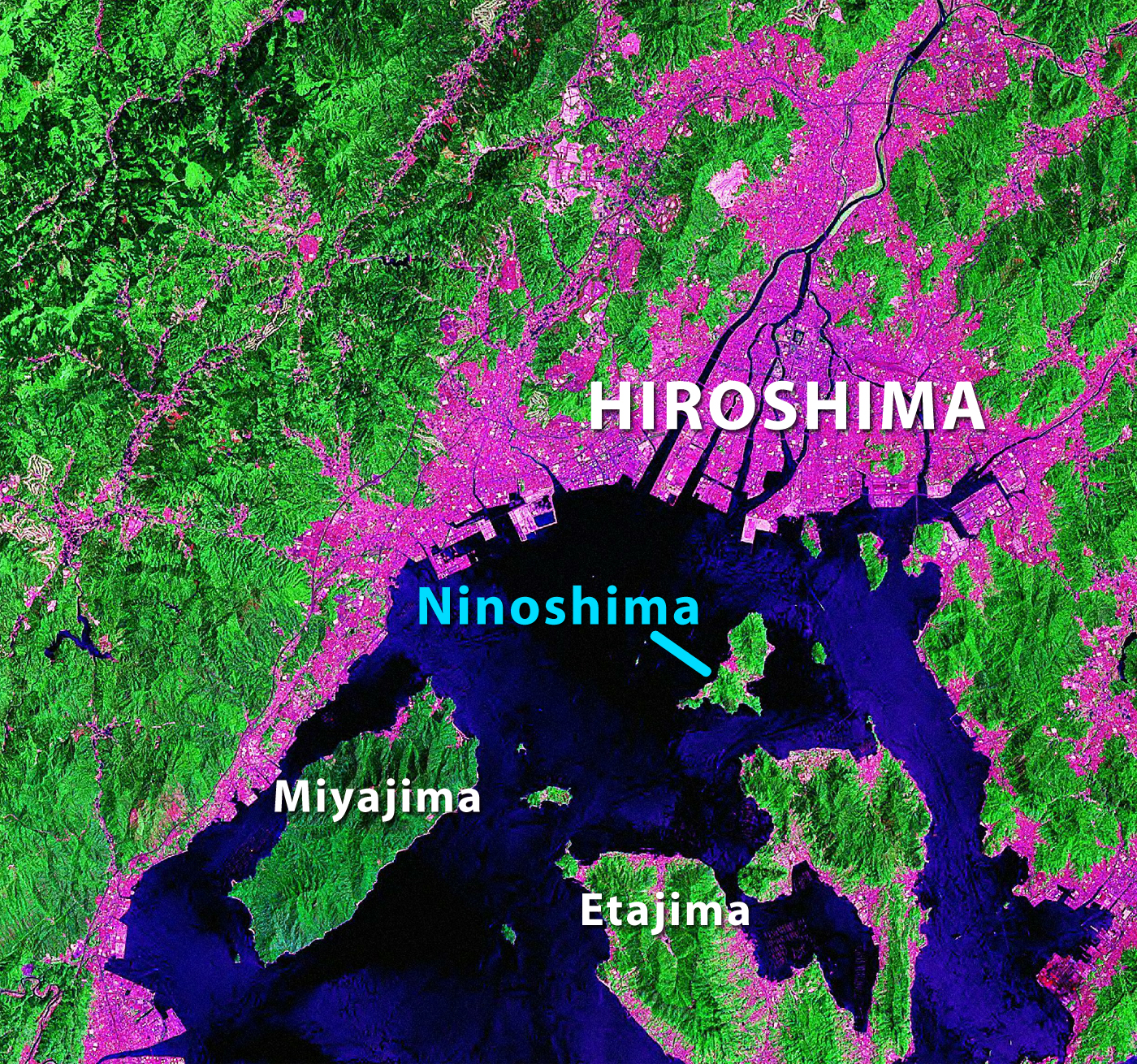
Location of Ninoshima, 4 km from Hiroshima (Landsat image)

Ninoshima (Japanese: 似島) is an island in the Seto Inland Sea, located near Hiroshima. Gakuen-mae pier on Ninoshima is located 4 km (2.5 mi) from Hiroshima (Ujina) Port. It takes only half an hour to get to Ninoshima from wharf 4 of Hiroshima Port (Ujina Port) by ferry. The island is 3.87 km^{2} (1.49 sq mi) in size, and topped with the mountain Aki-no-Kofuji (278 m). In Japanese, the mountain's name means "Little Fuji of Aki" (the former name of the Hiroshima area). The name of the island means "resemblance island", as the shape of the island and its mountain resemble Mount Fuji.

== History ==
Military facilities were established in Ninoshima in the 19th century. During the First Sino-Japanese War, Ninoshima served as a quarantine station. During World War I, internment camps were located on Ninoshima to house German prisoners of war. Ninoshima might be the birthplace of Japanese Baumkuchen by Karl Juchheim which later became a very famous cake in Japan.

=== World War II ===
During the Second World War the island served as a quarantine centre for the Imperial Japanese Army and Navy. On Ninoshima was built a dock, arsenal, facilities for the study of infectious diseases contracted by service personnel overseas, and a horse quarantine station. Training facilities for the 10th Training Unit of the Army Marine Training Division were also located on Ninoshima, as well as a fuel depot.

Nine kilometres (5.6 mi) from central Hiroshima, when the atom bomb was dropped on Hiroshima on 6 August 1945, the island was unscathed by the initial blast. Therefore, for the following three weeks the island became the destination of victims of the atomic bombing. In those weeks about 10,000 people were shipped to the island, to an emergency field hospital set-up there temporarily. The emergency field hospital operated from August 6 to August 25. Most of these were never to leave the island alive as thousands perished. The Hiroshima City War Victims Ninoshima Tower was erected on the island in 1947.

=== Post-war ===
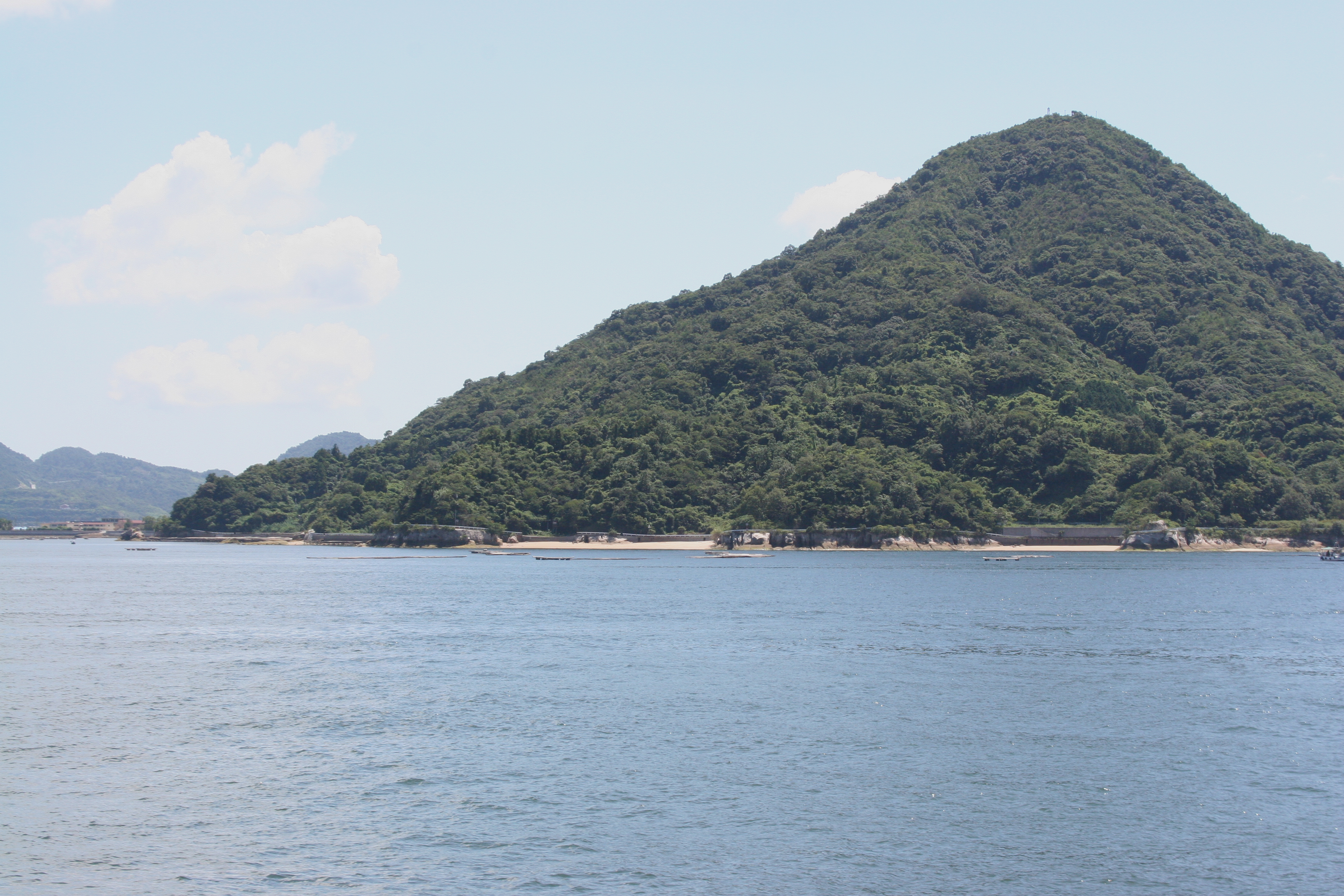
Aki-no-kofuji on Ninoshima

Ninoshima housed an orphanage, set up in September 1946, for war orphans. After the war, the quarantine station continued to operate until 1958, when it was converted into the Fourth Municipal Junior High School, now the Ninoshima Elementary School and Ninoshima Junior High School.

In 1971, a mass grave containing 571 victims’ skeletons was found on the grounds of Ninoshima Junior High School. All the remains found were transferred to the Atomic Bomb Memorial Mound at Hiroshima Peace Memorial Park. More remains were exhumed in 2004.

== Present day ==
As of 2006, the population of the island is 1,168, including 662 households. In addition to the schools, Ninoshima has a ward office, post office, and environmental office.
