= Wang Pu =

Wang Pu may refer to:

- Wang Pu (Tang dynasty) (王溥) (died 905), chief councilor of the Tang dynasty
- Wang Pu (Song dynasty) (王溥) (922–982), chief councilor of the Later Zhou and Song dynasties
- Wang Pu (physicist) (王普) (1902–1969), Chinese physicist
