= Namyang Seo clan =

Korean clan from Suwon

- Country: Korea
- Current region: Suwon
- Founder: Seo Gan

Namyang Seo clan (Korean: 남양 서씨; Hanja: 南陽 徐氏) is one of the Korean clans. Their Bon-gwan is in Suwon, Gyeonggi Province. According to the research held in 2000, the number of the Namyang Seo clan was 2246. Their founder was Seo Gan who was naturalized from China during Goryeo period. Seo Gan was dispatched Goryeo as one of Hanlin Academy, and got two positions named "grandmaster" (태사님 TaeSaNim 太師님) and Count of Namyang. His descendant officially began Namyang Hong clan, and designated Bon-gwan as Namyang.

== See also ==
- Korean clan names of foreign origin
