= Chungju Mae clan =

Korean clan from North Chungcheong Province

- Country: Korea
- Current region: Chungju
- Founder: Mae Gun-seo

Chungju Mae clan (Korean: 충주 매씨; Hanja: 忠州 梅氏) is one of the Korean clans. Their Bon-gwan is in Chungju, North Chungcheong Province. According to the research held in 2000, the number of the Chungju Mae clan was 210. Their founder was Mae Gun-seo. He was from Jinan, Shandong, China. He was naturalized and settled in Chungju after he immigrated to Korea. According to the census held in 1985 and 2000, the number of the Chungju Mae clan was 200. Also, Haeju Mae clan and Chungju Mae clan have the same origin, but the population was only one family with four people.

== See also ==
- Korean clan names of foreign origin
