= Namyang Bang clan =

Korean clan from Gyeonggi Province

- Country: Korea
- Current region: Hwaseong, Gyeonggi
- Founder: Bang Gye hong
- Connected members: Mir (singer); Go Eun-ah; Seol In-ah; Bang Si-hyuk

Namyang Bang clan (Korean: 남양 방씨; Hanja: 南陽 房氏) is one of the Korean clans. Their Bon-gwan is in Hwaseong, Gyeonggi, Gyeonggi Province. According to the research held in 2000, the number of the Namyang Bang clan was 27454. Fang Yi'ai, a second child of Fang Xuanling’s who worked as Chancellor were dispatched to Goguryeo as one of Tang dynasty’s Hanlin Academy because of Fang Yi'ai in Goguryeo’s Bojang request. The founder was Bang Gye hong who was a descendant of Fang Yi'ai.

== See also ==
- Korean clan names of foreign origin
