= Karl Juchheim =

German confectioner

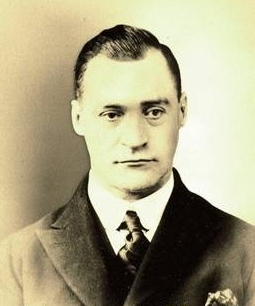
- Born: 25 December 1886; Kaub, Germany
- Died: 14 August 1945 (aged 58); Kobe, Japan

Karl Joseph Wilhelm Juchheim (25 December 1886 – 14 August 1945) was a German confectioner who first introduced baumkuchen, a traditional German layered cake, to Japan. The Juchheim Company, founded by Karl Juchheim and his wife in 1921, continues to sell baumkuchen and other sweets according to Juchheim's original recipe in pastry shops throughout Japan.

== Life ==
=== Early life in Jiaozhou ===
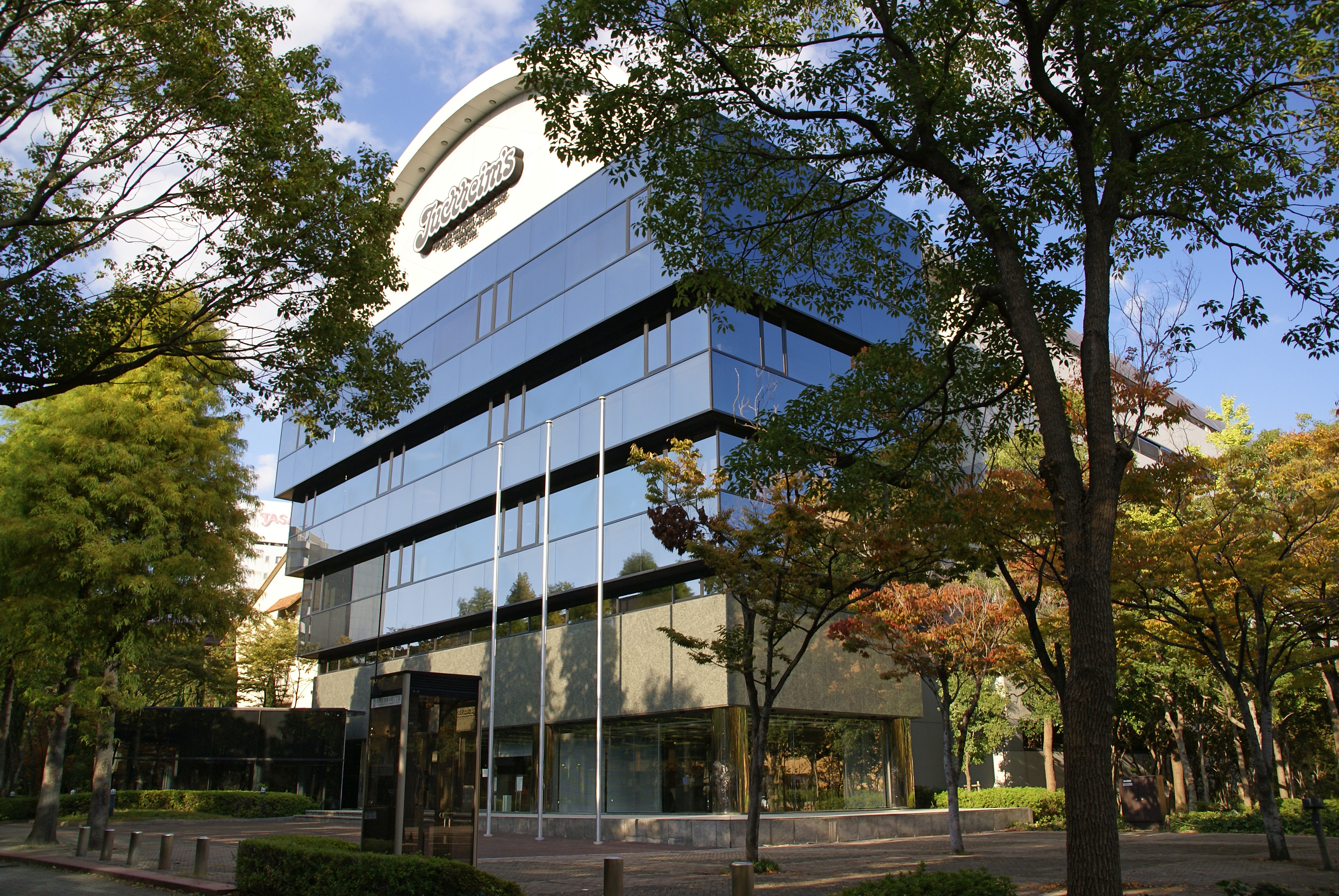
Headquarters of Juchheim Co., Ltd. in Kobe, Japan

Karl Juchheim was born and raised in Kaub, Germany. In 1908, the 22-year-old Juchheim moved to Jiaozhou Bay in Shandong Province, China. Jiaozhou, known to the Germans as Kiautschou, was at the time a German protectorate but still under Chinese rule under a treaty agreement made in 1898. Juchheim began working at a café in Jiaozhou. In 1909 he began his own pastry shop where he sold cakes. After a five-year stay in China he returned to Germany for a short time in order to find a wife. Through his uncle, he met a 22-year-old woman named Elise in the spring of 1914 and became engaged to her shortly after. Although only recently returned from China, Juchheim and Elise returned to Jiaozhou shortly after their engagement. They married on 28 July 1914 and together started another pastry shop in the city of Qingdao in Jiaozhou Bay.

=== Prisoner of war ===
Shortly after World War I broke out, British and Japanese forces began the Siege of Qingdao. Karl served as a private in the Landsturm. After the fall of Qingdao, Karl and Elise were both sent to internment camps in Okinawa, Japan as prisoners of war. While interned, Elise gave birth to their first child on 4 November 1915.

Karl Juchheim and other prisoners were later relocated to a camp at Ninoshima, a small island located close to Hiroshima, in 1919. Juchheim baked and sold the first baumkuchen among other in Japan in March 1919 at the Hiroshima Prefectural Products Exhibition Hall (広島県物産陳列館, now: Hiroshima Peace Memorial) in the city of Hiroshima. He might have baked the first Baumkuchen on Ninoshima before the exhibition.

With the end of World War I in 1918, most of the prisoners were released between December 1919 – January 1920. The majority went back to Germany but some, such as Karl Juchheim and his wife, settled down in Japan and East Asia instead.

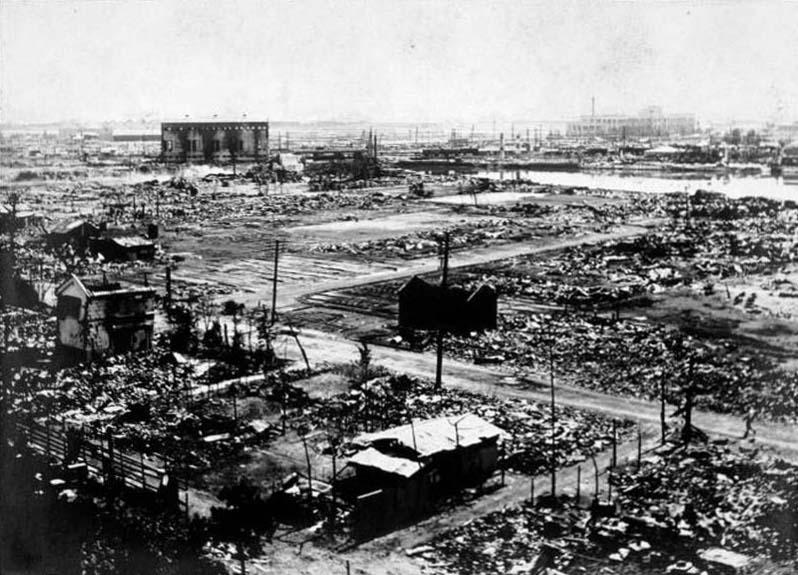
A view of the destruction in Yokohama after the 1923 Great Kantō earthquake

=== Post-War period ===
After the war, the Juchheims opened their own pastry shop in 1921 in Yokohama with the name E. Juchheim, named after Elise. As a pastry chef Karl Juchheim was responsible for the production of the cake and pastries while Elise took care of sales. The Great Kantō earthquake of 1 September 1923 destroyed their shop completely. The couple then moved to Kobe, borrowed a large sum of money and opened a new store. The store was a success and saw growth soon after it opened.

=== Death ===
Due to the Pacific War, by 1944 the lease to their shop was terminated because production was no longer possible. The family then moved into the hotel Rokkōsan, Kobe. There, Karl Juchheim died on 14 August 1945, 19 days before the surrender of Japan. For cost reasons, his body was cremated. His son, Karl-Franz was conscripted into the German army in 1942 and declared dead following the end of the war. Subsequently his place and date of death were determined to be 6 May 1945, in Vienna.

After the war, Elise was expropriated and deported back to Germany by the Supreme Commander for the Allied Powers. Elise Juchheim was able to return to Japan in 1953. Both Karl and Elise Juchheim are now buried in a cemetery in Ashiya.

== Company ==
Today, the headquarters for Juchheim Co., Ltd. is in Kobe, Japan. Its characteristic design has been a tradition for about 40 years. The company boasts that it still produces confectionery according to the original German recipe. Juchheim in Japan has many branches and subsidiaries. Their shops are especially known for their baumkuchen cakes, Frankfurter Kranz, cookies, and apple pie. The group has about 5640 employees and annual sales of ¥27,400,000,000.
