= Ganghwa Noh clan =

Korean clan from Incheon

- Country: Korea
- Current region: Ganghwa County
- Founder: Lu Zhonglian (魯仲連; 305–245 BC)
- Connected members: Roh Hoe-chan

Ganghwa Noh clan (Korean: 강화 노씨; Hanja: 江華 魯氏) is a Korean clan. Their Bon-gwan is in Ganghwa County, Incheon. As of 2015, the clan has a membership of 17073. Lu Zhonglian (魯仲連; 305–245 BC), a political icon in Qi during the Warring States period, began the Noh clan in Korea. Noh Yong sin (Hanja: 魯龍臣), a descendant of Lu Zhonglian, worked as a minister of civil service affairs (吏部尚書, Hubu Shangshu) in Goryeo during Myeongjong of Goryeo's reign. Then, he was the Prince of Ganghwa when Goryeo was attacked by Mongolia and transferred the capital to Ganghwa County. After that, a descendant of Noh Yong sin, officially began Ganghwa Noh clan and made Ganghwa County Ganghwa Noh clan's Bon-gwan.

== See also ==
- Korean clan names of foreign origin
