= Wang Bo (martial artist) =

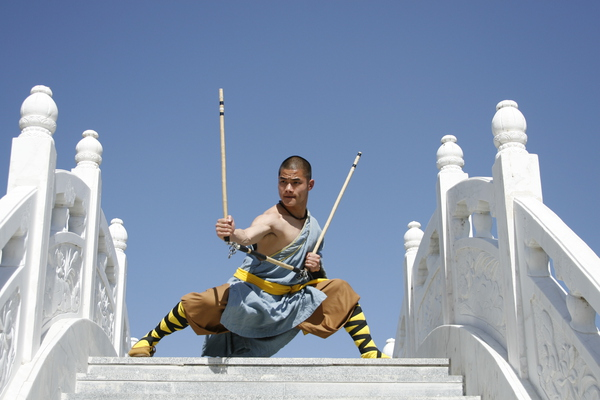
- Wang Bo at the Shaolin Temple
- Born: November 2, 1989 (age 36); Shandong Province, China
- Style: Monkey Style
- Rank: 7 段Duan Kung Fu

Wang Bo (Chinese: 王博; pinyin: Wáng Bó) (born Nov 2, 1989) is a martial artist, Zen Buddhist monk, Shaolin Kung Fu master, and Shifu of the Shaolin Temple Torrance, located in Torrance, CA, a main branch of the original Shaolin Temple of China. He is the founder of Hungrymonk Yoga.

== Life and career ==
Wang Bo was born in a rural village of Shandong Province, China on November 2, 1989. The family relocated to the Shaolin village on Mount Song in central Henan Province, home to the Shaolin Temple, a Chán Buddhist monastery built in 495 A.D., considered to be the birthplace of Shaolin Kung Fu and associated with many other Chinese Martial Arts. At age 8, his father enrolled Wang and his brother to live in the temple amongst the monks.

Wang studied Monkey style Kung Fu under Shifu Shi Yongxin, now abbot of the temple. At age 11, he began performing in the world tour of the Shaolin Wheel of Life show with the Shaolin Performing Arts Troupe. Touring for three years throughout Europe, Australia, Canada and the United States, then becoming the troupe leader and director. At age 20, with the blessing of the Shaolin Temple, he relocated to the South Bay of Los Angeles in Southern California where he now lives and trains.

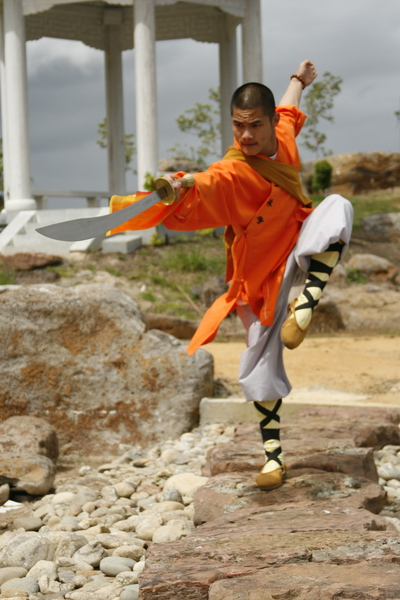
Wang Bo

In 2013, Wang Bo was featured on the cover of Black Belt magazine and an article. In August 2016, he was again featured on the cover of Black Belt.

== Dignitaries ==
Wang Bo has performed for world dignitaries such as:

- Queen Elizabeth II - April 21, 1999
- Henry Kissinger, (Former U.S. Secretary of State) - May 13, 2005
- Russian President Vladimir Putin - March 16, 2007
- King of Spain Juan Carlos - April 2, 2007
