= Joseon =

1392–1897 Korean dynasty

Coordinates: 37.58°N 126.98°E

Joseon 조선 고려국 (1392–1393) 高麗國 조선국 (1393–1910) 朝鮮國 대조선국 (1894–1897) 大朝鮮國
- 1392–1897
- Top: Flag (1883–1897); Bottom: Royal standard Emblem (c. 1884–1897) Royal emblem

- Royal Seal

- Territory of Joseon after King Sejong's conquest of Jurchens in 1433 (with current borders)
- Status: Tributary relations with the Ming and Qing (1401–1895)^{a} Qing intervention (1882–1894)^{a} Japanese intervention (1894–1896)
- Capital: Main: Hanseong (now Seoul) (1394–1399/1405–1897); Temporary: Kaegyŏng (1392–1394/1399–1405)
- Official languages: Middle Korean, Early Modern Korean, Classical Chinese (literary Chinese or Hanmun in Korean)
- Religion: Confucianism (state religion), Buddhism, Musok, Taoism, Christianity (recognized in 1886)
- Demonym: Korean
- Government: Absolute monarchy
- King
  - 1392–1398: Taejo (first)
  - 1864–1897: Gojong (last)
- Chief State Councillor (Note: Style: Yŏngŭijŏng (1401–1894); Naegak chongri daesin (1894–96); Uijeong (1896–1905))
  - 1392: Bae Geuk-ryeom (first)
  - 1894–1898: Kim Byeong-si (last)
- Legislature: None (rule by decree) (until 1894); Jungchuwon (from 1894)
- History
  - Enthronement of Taejo: August 5, 1392
  - Country renamed from Goryeo to Joseon: March 28, 1393
  - Promulgation of the Korean alphabet: October 9, 1446
  - Japanese invasions: 1592–1598
  - First and second Manchu invasions: 1627, 1636–1637
  - Japan–Korea Treaty of 1876: February 26, 1876
  - Japanese occupation: July 23, 1894
  - Treaty of Shimonoseki: April 17, 1895
  - Proclamation of the Korean Empire: October 13, 1897

Population
  - 1519: 3,300,000
  - 1889: 16,000,000
- Currency: Mun (1423–1425, 1625–1892); Yang (1892–1897)
Preceded by	Succeeded by
Goryeo; Tamna	Korean Empire
- Today part of: North Korea; South Korea
- 1. The diplomatic system of East Asia was hierarchical, lacking in equality. Joseon Korea enjoyed a high level of independence and sovereignty in domestic and foreign affairs while ritually subordinate to the Ming and Qing dynasties of China. However, the Qing dynasty was directly involved in the affairs of Joseon from the Imo Incident of 1882 until the Treaty of Shimonoseki of 1895.

Korean name
- Hangul: 조선
- Hanja: 朝鮮
- RR: Joseon
- MR: Chosŏn
- IPA: [tɕo.sʰʌn]

North Korean name
- Hangul: 조선봉건왕조
- Hanja: 朝鮮封建王朝
- RR: Joseon bonggeon wangjo
- MR: Chosŏn ponggŏn wangjo

Official name
- Hangul: 대조선국
- Hanja: 大朝鮮國
- RR: Daejoseonguk
- MR: Taejosŏn'guk
- IPA: [tʰɛ.dʑo.sʰʌn.ɡuk̚]

Joseon (Note: Middle Korean: 됴ᇢ〯션〮 Dywǒw syén or 됴ᇢ〯션〯 Dywǒw syěn) (English: /ˈtʃoʊsʌn/ CHOH-sun; Korean: 조선; Hanja: 朝鮮; also romanized as Chosun), officially Great Joseon State (대조선국; 大朝鮮國), was a dynastic kingdom of Korea that existed for 505 years. It was founded by Taejo of Joseon in 1392 and replaced by the Korean Empire in 1897. The kingdom was founded after the overthrow of Goryeo in what is today the city of Kaesong. In 1393, Korea was retitled and the capital was moved to modern-day Seoul. The kingdom's northernmost borders were expanded to the natural boundaries at the rivers of Amnok and Tuman through the subjugation of the Jurchens.

Over the centuries, Joseon encouraged the entrenchment of Confucian ideals and doctrines in Korean society. Neo-Confucianism was installed as the new state's ideology. Buddhism was accordingly discouraged, and occasionally Buddhists faced persecution. Joseon consolidated its effective rule over the Korean peninsula and saw the height of classical Korean culture, trade, literature, science, and technology. The kingdom was severely weakened by failed Japanese invasions in 1592 and 1598, which were followed by invasions by the Later Jin dynasty in 1627 and the Qing dynasty in 1636–1637. The country pursued an increasingly harsh isolationist policy, becoming known as the "hermit kingdom" in Western literature. After the end of these invasions from Manchuria, Joseon experienced a nearly 200-year period of peace and prosperity, along with cultural and technological development. What power the kingdom recovered during its isolation waned as the 18th century came to a close. Faced with internal strife, power struggles, international pressure, and rebellions at home, the kingdom declined rapidly in the late 19th century.

The Joseon period left a substantial legacy. Modern Korean bureaucracy and administrative divisions were established during it. The modern Korean language and its dialects derive from the culture and traditions of Joseon, as does much of Korean culture, etiquette, norms, and societal attitudes.

== History ==
=== Early period (late 14th-mid 16th century) ===
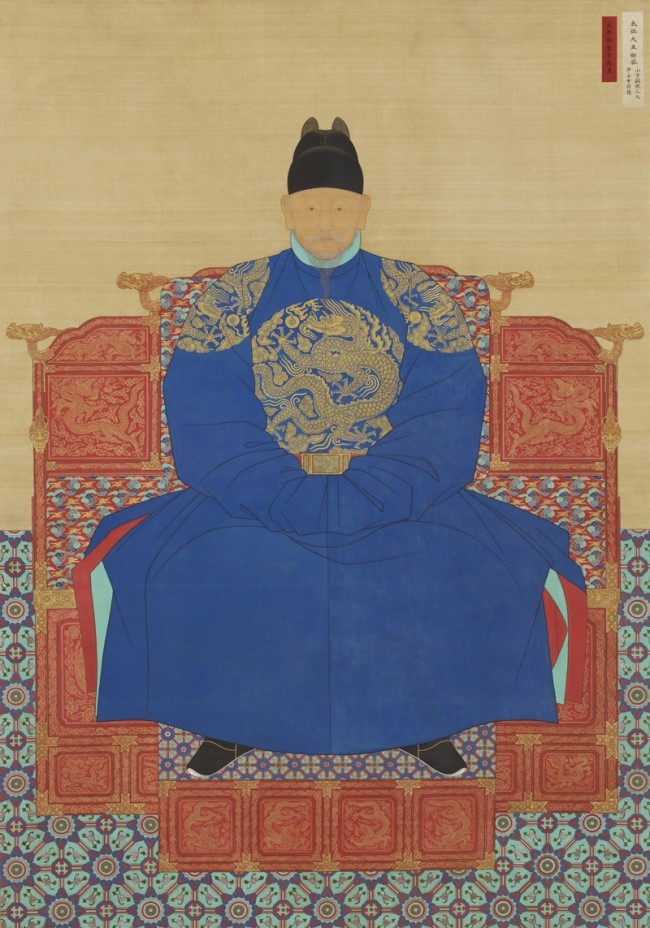
King Taejo's portrait

==== Founding ====
By the late 14th century, the nearly 500-year-old Goryeo established in 918 was tottering; its foundations were collapsing from years of war spilled over from the disintegrating Yuan dynasty. Following the emergence of the Ming dynasty, the royal court in Goryeo split into two conflicting factions, one favoring neutrality and the other wanting to retake the Liaodong peninsula, which many in Goryeo believed was theirs. Goryeo remained a neutral third-party observer in the conflict between the Yuan and the Ming and had friendly diplomatic relations with both. In 1388, a Ming messenger came to Goryeo to demand that territories of the former Ssangseong Prefecture be handed over to Ming China. The tract of land was taken by Mongol forces during the invasion of Korea, but had been reclaimed by Goryeo in 1356 as the Yuan dynasty weakened. The act caused an uproar among the Goryeo court, and General Ch'oe Yŏng seized the chance to argue for an invasion of the Ming-controlled Liaodong Peninsula.

General Yi Sŏnggye was chosen to lead the attack; he revolted, swept back to the capital Kaegyŏng (now Kaesong) and initiated a coup d'état, overthrowing King U of Goryeo in favor of his son, Chang of Goryeo (1388). Neo-Confucian scholars, who were a small and medium-sized power at the time, were able to use this incident as an opportunity to lay a political foundation, and in particular, Chŏng Tojŏn, a friend of Yi Sŏnggye, wanted to use this incident as an opportunity to reform the corrupt nobles and the Buddhist community. He later killed King U and his son after a failed restoration and forcibly placed a royal named Wang Yo on the throne (he became King Gongyang of Goryeo). In 1392, Yi eliminated Chŏng Mong-ju, a highly respected leader of a group loyal to the Goryeo dynasty, and dethroned King Gongyang, exiling him to Wonju, and he ascended the throne himself. The Goryeo kingdom had come to an end after 474 years of rule.

At the beginning of his reign, Yi Sŏnggye, now ruler of Korea, intended to continue to use the name Goryeo for the country he ruled and simply change the royal line of descent to his own, thus maintaining the façade of continuing the 500-year-old Goryeo tradition. After numerous threats of mutiny from the drastically weakened but still influential Gwonmun nobles, who continued to swear allegiance to the remnants of the Goryeo and to the now-demoted House of Wang, the consensus in the reformed court was that a new dynastic title was needed to signify the change. In naming the new kingdom, Taejo contemplated two possibilities: "Hwaryeong" (his place of birth) and "Joseon". After much internal deliberation, as well as endorsement by the neighboring Ming dynasty's emperor, Taejo declared the name of the kingdom to be Joseon, a tribute to the ancient Korean state of Gojoseon. He also moved the capital to Hanseong (modern Seoul) from Kaegyŏng (modern Kaesong).

==== Strifes of princes ====
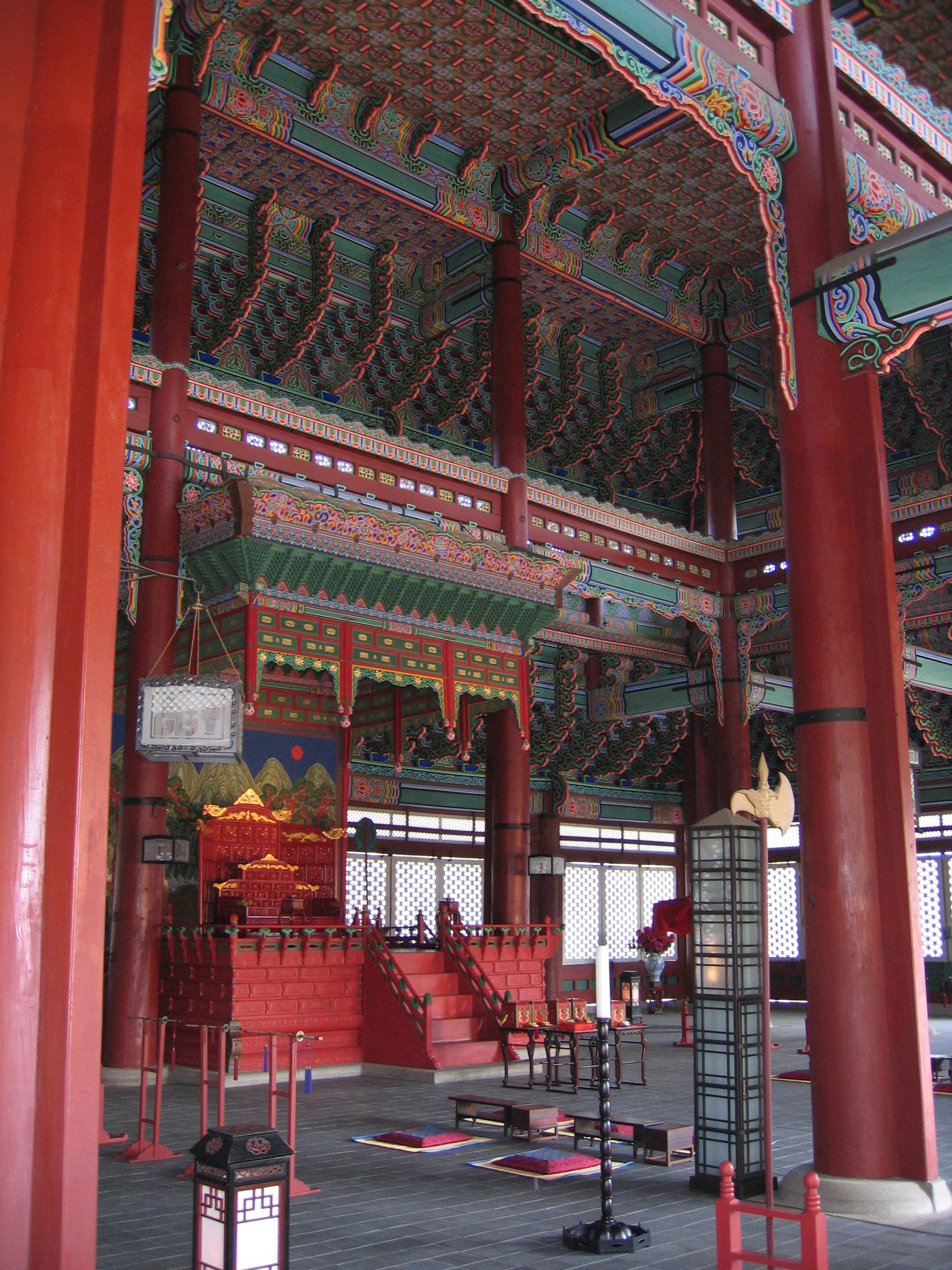
The throne room at Gyeongbokgung

When the new dynasty was brought into existence, Taejo brought up the issue of which son would be his successor. Although Yi Pangwŏn, Taejo's fifth son by Queen Sinui, had contributed the most to assisting his father's rise to power, Chief State Councillor Jeong Dojeon and Nam Ŭn used their influence on the king to name Yi Pangsŏk, his eighth son (second son of Queen Sindeok), as crown prince in 1392. This conflict arose largely because Chŏng Tojŏn, who shaped and laid down ideological, institutional, and legal foundations of the new kingdom more than anyone else, saw Joseon as a kingdom led by ministers appointed by the king while Yi Pangwŏn wanted to establish an absolute monarchy ruled directly by the king. With Taejo's support, Chŏng Tojŏn kept limiting the royal family's power by prohibiting the political involvement of princes and attempting to abolish their private armies. Both sides were well aware of each other's great animosity and were getting ready to strike first.

After the sudden death of Queen Sindeok, while King Taejo was still in mourning for his second wife, Yi Pangwŏn struck first by raiding the palace, and killed Chŏng Tojŏn and his supporters as well as Queen Sindeok's two sons (his half-brothers), including the crown prince in 1398. This incident became known as the First Strife of Princes.

Aghast at the fact that his sons were willing to kill each other for the crown, and psychologically exhausted from the death of his second wife, King Taejo abdicated and immediately crowned his second son Yi Bang-gwa as King Jeongjong. One of King Jeongjong's first acts as monarch was to revert the capital to Kaegyŏng, where he is believed to have been considerably more comfortable, away from the toxic power strife. Yet Yi Pangwŏn retained real power and was soon in conflict with his disgruntled older brother, Yi Panggan, who also yearned for power. In 1400, the tensions between Yi Pangwŏn's faction and Yi Panggan's camp escalated into an all-out conflict that came to be known as the "Second Strife of Princes". In the aftermath of the struggle, the defeated Yi Panggan was exiled to Dosan while his supporters were executed. Thoroughly intimidated, King Jeongjong immediately invested Yi Pangwŏn as heir presumptive and voluntarily abdicated. That same year, Yi Pangwŏn assumed the throne of Joseon as King Taejong, third king of the dynasty.

==== Consolidation of royal power ====
At the beginning of Taejong's reign, the former King Taejo refused to relinquish the royal seal that signified the legitimacy of any king's rule. Regardless, Taejong initiated policies he believed would prove his qualification to rule. One of his first acts as king was to abolish the privilege enjoyed by the upper echelons of government and the aristocracy to maintain private armies. His revocation of such rights to field independent forces effectively severed their ability to muster large-scale revolts, and drastically increased the number of men employed in the national military. Taejong's next act as king was to revise the existing legislation concerning the taxation of land ownership and the recording of state of subjects. With the discovery of previously hidden land, national income increased twofold.

In 1399, Taejong had played an influential role in scrapping the Dopyeong Assembly, a council of the old government administration that held a monopoly in court power during the waning years of Goryeo, in favor of the State Council of Joseon, a new branch of central administration that revolved around the king and his edicts. After passing the subject documentation and taxation legislation, he issued a new decree in which all decisions passed by the State Council could only come into effect with the approval of the king. This ended the custom of court ministers and advisors making decisions through debate and negotiations amongst themselves, and thus brought the royal power to new heights.

Shortly thereafter, Taejong installed an office, known as the Sinmun Office, to hear cases in which aggrieved subjects felt that they had been exploited or treated unjustly by government officials or aristocrats. He kept Chŏng Tojŏn's reforms intact for the most part. In addition, Taejong executed or exiled many of his supporters who had helped him ascend the throne to strengthen his own royal authority. To limit the influence of in-laws, he killed all four of his wife's brothers and Sim On, the father-in-law of his son Sejong.

Taejong remains a controversial figure who killed many of his rivals and relatives to gain power and yet ruled effectively to improve the populace's lives, strengthen national defense, and lay down a solid foundation for his successor Sejong's rule.

==== Sejong the Great ====
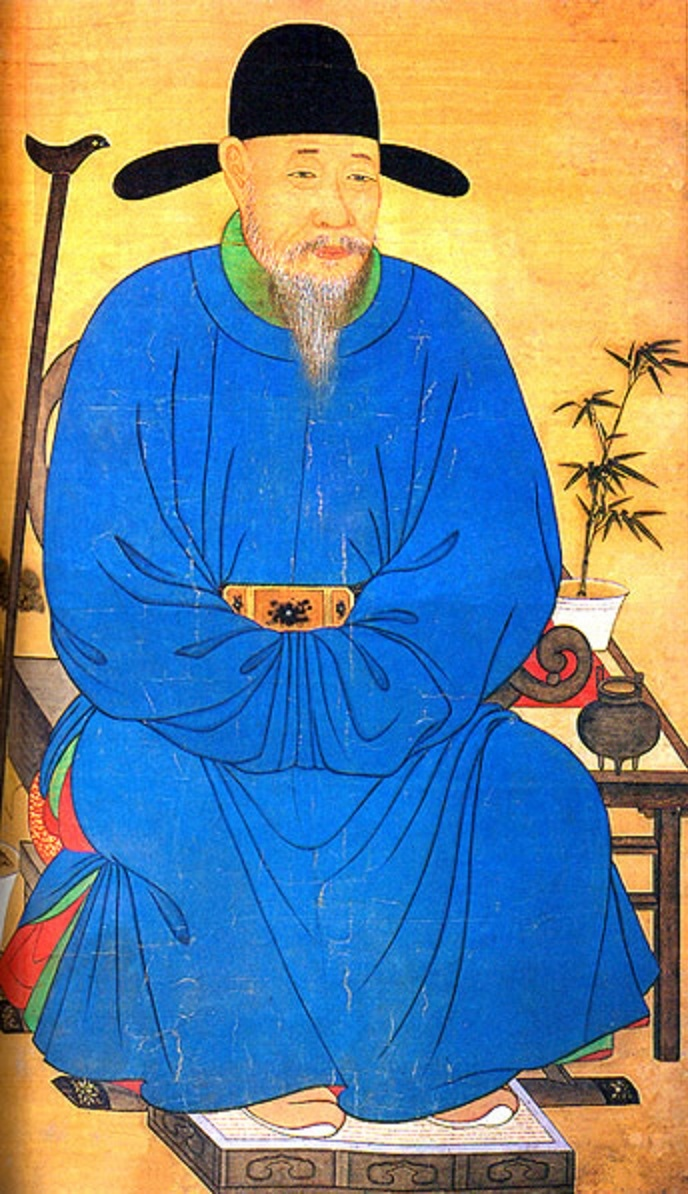
Portrait of Ha Yeon, who served as Chief State Councillor during King Sejong's reign

A page from the Hunmin Jeongeum Eonhae, a partial translation of Hunminjeongeum, the original promulgation of the Korean alphabet

In August 1418, following Taejong's abdication two months earlier, Sejong the Great ascended the throne. In May 1419, King Sejong, under the advice and guidance of his father Taejong, embarked upon the Gihae Eastern Expedition to remove the nuisance of waegu (coastal pirates) who had been operating out of Tsushima Island.

In September 1419, the daimyō of Tsushima, Sadamori, capitulated to the Joseon court. In 1443, The Treaty of Gyehae was signed in which the daimyō of Tsushima was granted rights to conduct trade with Korea using fifty ships per year in exchange for sending tribute to Korea and aiding to stop any Waegu coastal pirate raids on Korean ports.

On the northern border, Sejong established four forts and six posts to safeguard his people from the Jurchens, who later became the Manchus, living in Manchuria. In 1433, Sejong sent Kim Chongsŏ, a government official, north to fend off the Jurchens. Kim's military campaign captured several castles, pushed north, and expanded Korean territory, roughly the current border between North Korea and China.

During the rule of Sejong, Korea saw advances in natural science, agriculture, literature, traditional Chinese medicine, and engineering. Because of such success, Sejong was given the title "Sejong the Great". The most remembered contribution of King Sejong is the creation of Hangul, the Korean alphabet, in 1443. Rejected in its time by the scholarly elite, the everyday use of Hanja in writing was eventually surpassed by Hangul in the latter half of the 20th century.

==== Six martyred ministers ====
After King Sejong's death, his son Munjong continued his father's legacy but soon died of illness in 1452, just two years after his coronation. He was succeeded by his twelve-year-old son, Danjong. In addition to two regents, Princess Gyeonghye also served as Danjong's guardian and, along with general Kim Chongsŏ, attempted to strengthen royal authority. Danjong's uncle, Grand Prince Suyang, gained control of the government and eventually deposed his nephew to become the seventh king of Joseon himself in 1455, taking the name Sejo. After six ministers loyal to Danjong attempted to assassinate Sejo to return Danjong to the throne, Sejo executed the six ministers and also killed Danjong in his place of exile.

King Sejo enabled the government to determine exact population numbers and to mobilize troops effectively. He also revised the land ordinance to improve the national economy and encouraged the publication of books. Most importantly, he compiled the Grand Code for State Administration, which became the cornerstone of dynastic administration and provided the first form of constitutional law in written form in Korea.

Sejo undermined much of the foundation of many existing systems, including the Jiphyeonjeon which his predecessors, Sejong and Munjong, had carefully laid down. He cut down on everything he deemed unworthy and caused countless complications in the long run. Many of these adjustments were made for his own power, not regarding the consequences and problems that would occur. The favoritism he showed toward the ministers who aided him in taking the throne led to increased corruption in the higher echelons of the political field.

===== Institutional arrangements and Prosper culture =====
Sejo's weak son Yejong succeeded him as the eighth king, but died two years later in 1469. Yejong's nephew Seongjong ascended the throne. His reign was marked by the prosperity and growth of the national economy and the rise of neo-Confucian scholars called Sarim who were encouraged by Seongjong to enter court politics. He established Hongmun'gwan, the royal library and advisory council composed of Confucian scholars, with whom he discussed philosophy and government policies. He ushered in a cultural golden age that rivaled Sejong's reign by publishing numerous books on geography, ethics, and various other fields.

He also sent several military campaigns against the Jurchens on the northern border in 1491, like many of his predecessors. The campaign, led by General Heo Jong, was successful, and the defeated Jurchens, led by the Udige clan, retreated to the north of the Yalu River. King Seongjong was succeeded by his son, Yeonsangun, in 1494.

==== Literati purges ====
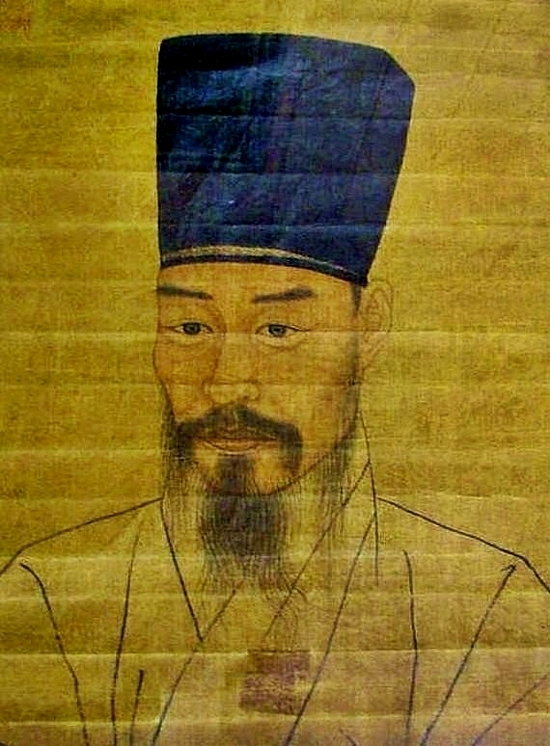
Portrait of the neo-Confucian scholar, Cho Kwangjo (1482–1519)

Yeonsangun is often considered the worst tyrant in Joseon's history, whose reign was marked by literati purges between 1498 and 1506. His behavior became erratic after he learned that his biological mother was not Queen Junghyeon but the deposed Queen Yun, who was forced to drink poison after poisoning one of Seongjong's concubines out of jealousy and leaving a scratch mark on Seongjong's face. When he was shown a piece of clothing that was allegedly stained with his mother's blood vomited after drinking poison, he beat two of Seongjong's concubines, who had accused Queen Yun of death, and pushed his grandmother, Grand Queen Dowager Insu, who died afterward. He executed government officials who supported Queen Yun's death along with their families. He also executed sarim scholars for writing phrases critical of Sejo's usurpation of the throne.

Yeonsangun also seized a thousand women from the provinces to serve as palace entertainers and appropriated the Sungkyunkwan as a personal pleasure ground. He abolished the Office of Censors, whose function was to criticize inappropriate actions and policies of the king, and Hongmungwan. He banned the use of hangul when the common people used it on posters to criticize the king. After twelve years of misrule, he was finally deposed in a coup which placed his half-brother Jungjong on the throne in 1506.

Jungjong was a fundamentally weak king because of the circumstances that placed him on the throne, but his reign also saw a period of significant reforms led by his minister Cho Kwangjo, the charismatic leader of sarim. He established a local self-government system called hyangyak to strengthen local autonomy and communal spirit among the people, sought to reduce the gap between the rich and poor with a land reform that would distribute land to farmers more equally and limit the amount of land and number of slaves that one could own, promulgated Confucian writings with vernacular translations widely among the populace, and sought to trim the size of government by reducing the number of bureaucrats. According to the Veritable Records of the Joseon Dynasty, it was said that no official dared to receive a bribe or exploit the populace during this time because as Inspector General, he applied the law strictly.

These radical reforms were very popular with the populace but were fiercely opposed by the conservative officials who had helped to put Jungjong on the throne. They plotted to cause Jungjong to doubt Cho's loyalty. Cho Kwangjo was executed, and most of his reform measures died with him in the resulting third literati purge. For nearly 50 years afterward, the court politics were marred by bloody and chaotic struggles between factions backing rival consorts and princes. In-laws of the royal family wielded great power and contributed to much corruption in that era.

=== Middle period (mid 16th-mid 17th century) ===
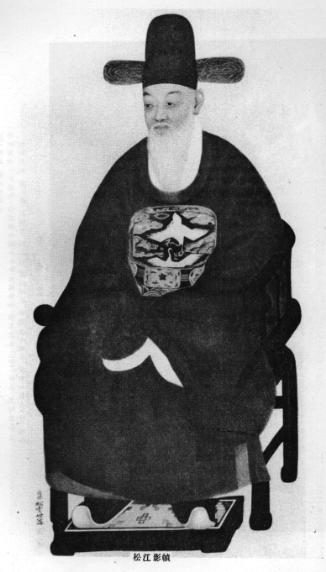
Chŏng Ch'ŏl (1536–1593), head of the Western faction

The middle Joseon period was marked by intense and bloody power struggles between political factions that weakened the country, and by large-scale invasions by Japan and Manchu which nearly toppled the kingdom.

==== Factional struggle ====
The Sarim faction had suffered a series of political defeats during the reigns of Yeonsangun, Jungjong, and Myeongjong, but it gained control of the government during the reign of King Seonjo. It soon split into opposing factions known as the Easterners and the Westerners by their political or philosophical masters. Easterners mainly followed the teachings and philosophy of Yi Hwang and Jo Sik while the Westerners followed the philosophy of Yi I and Song Hon. Within decades the Easterners themselves divided into the Southerners and the Northerners; in the seventeenth century the Westerners also permanently split into the Noron and the Soron. Factions in the Joseon dynasty were formed based on their different interpretations of Confucian philosophy, which mainly differed according to who their master was and what they believed in. The alternations in power among these factions were often accompanied by charges of treason and bloody purges, initiating a cycle of revenge with each change of regime.

One example is the 1589 rebellion of Chŏng Yŏrip, one of the bloodiest political purges of Joseon. Chŏng Yŏrip, an Easterner, had formed a society with a group of supporters that also received military training to fight against Waegu. There is still a dispute about the nature and purpose of his group, which reflected the desire for a classless society and spread throughout Honam. He was subsequently accused of conspiracy to start a rebellion. Chŏng Ch'ŏl, head of the Westerner faction, was in charge of investigating the case and used this event to affect the widespread purge of Easterners who had the slightest connection to Chŏng Yŏrip. Eventually 1000 Easterners were killed or exiled in the aftermath.

==== Japanese invasions ====
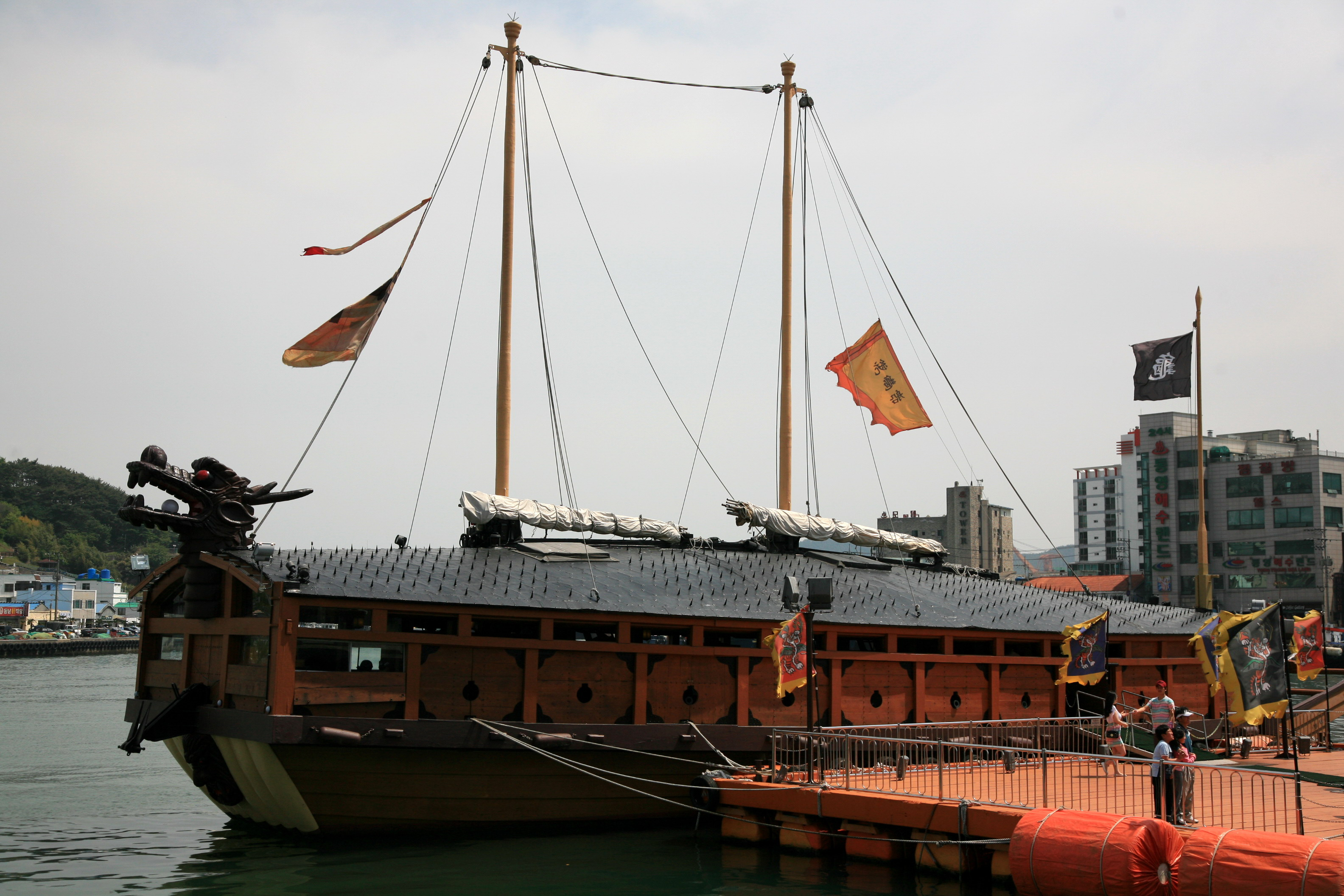
The Turtle ship (replica)

Throughout Korean history, there was frequent piracy on the sea and brigandage on land. The only purpose of the Joseon navy was to secure the maritime trade against the Waegu. The navy repelled pirates using advanced gunpowder technologies including cannons and fire arrows in the form of singijeon deployed by hwacha.

During the Japanese invasions in the 1590s, Toyotomi Hideyoshi, plotting the conquest of Ming China with Portuguese guns, invaded Korea with his daimyōs and their troops, intending to use Korea as a stepping stone. Factional division in the Joseon court, inability to assess Japanese military capability, and failed attempts at diplomacy led to poor preparation on Joseon's part. The use of superior firearms by the Japanese left most of the southern part of the Korean Peninsula occupied within months, with both Hanseong (present-day Seoul) and Pyongyang captured.

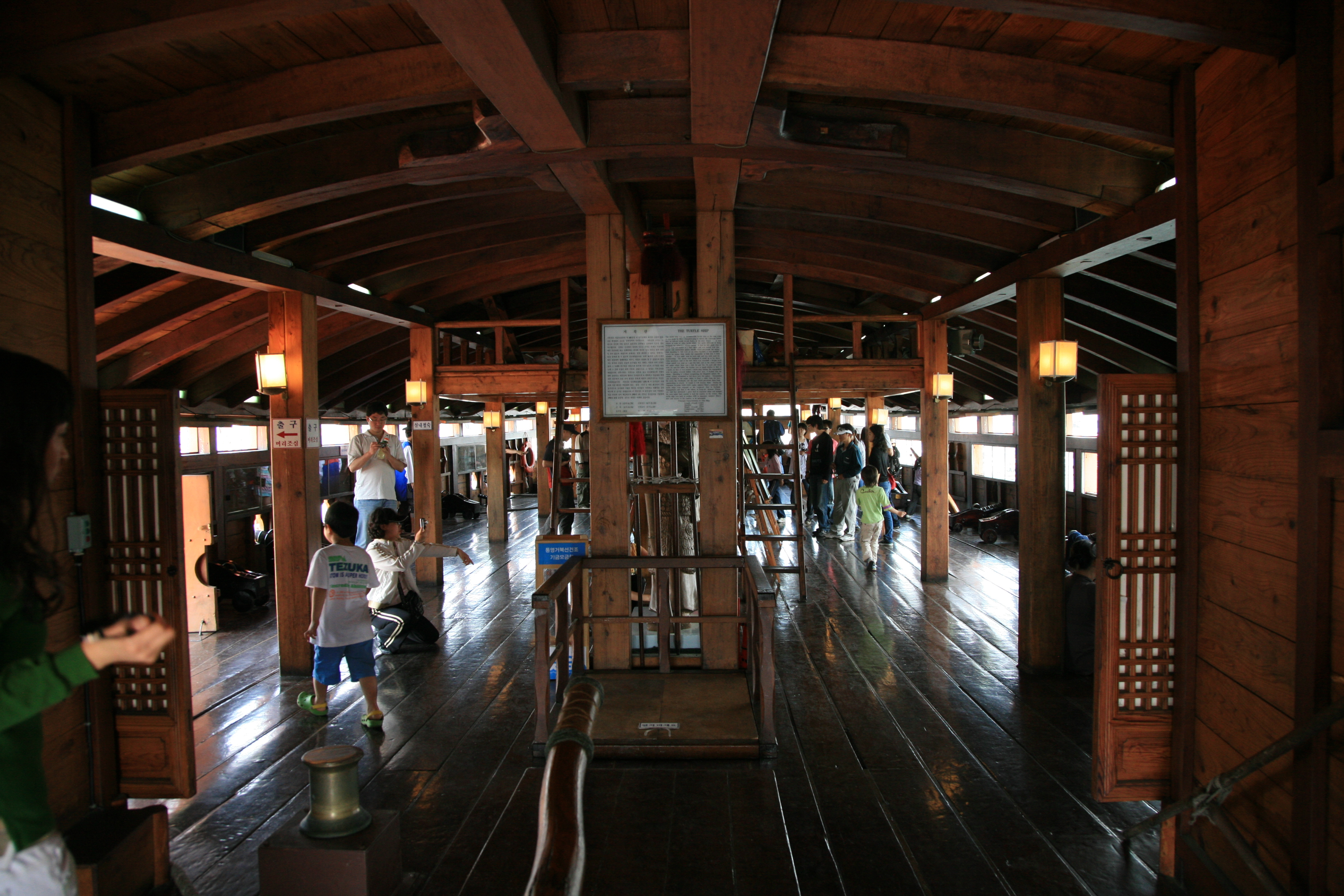
The Turtle Ship interior

The invasion was slowed when Admiral Yi Sun-sin destroyed the Japanese invasion fleet. The guerrilla resistance that eventually formed also helped. Local resistance slowed down the Japanese advance and decisive naval victories by Admiral Yi left control over sea routes in Korean hands, severely hampering Japanese supply lines. Furthermore, Ming China intervened on the side of the Koreans, sending a large force in 1593 which pushed back the Japanese together with the Koreans.

During the war, Koreans developed powerful firearms and the turtle ships. The Joseon and Ming forces defeated the Japanese at a deep price. Following the war, relations between Korea and Japan were completely suspended until 1609.

==== Manchu invasions ====
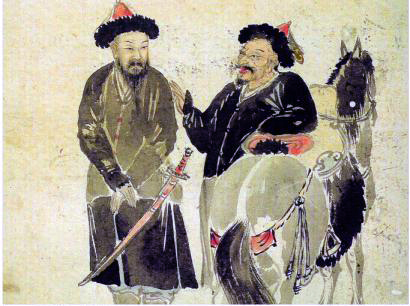
A Korean painting depicting two Jurchen warriors and their horses

After the Japanese invasions, the Korean Peninsula was devastated. Meanwhile, Nurhaci (r. 1583–1626), the chieftain of the Jianzhou Jurchens, was unifying the Jurchen tribes of Manchuria into a strong coalition that his son Hong Taiji (r. 1626–1643) would eventually rename the "Manchus". After he declared the Seven Grievances against Ming China in 1618, Nurhaci and the Ming engaged in several military conflicts. On such occasions, Nurhaci required help from Gwanghaegun of Joseon (r. 1608–1623), putting the Korean state in a difficult position because the Ming court was also requesting assistance. Gwanghaegun tried to maintain neutrality, but most of his officials opposed him for not supporting Ming China, which had saved Joseon during Hideyoshi's invasions.

In 1623, Gwanghaegun was deposed and replaced by Injo of Joseon (r. 1623–1649), who banished Gwanghaegun's supporters. Reverting his predecessor's foreign policy, the new king decided to openly support the Ming, but a rebellion led by military commander Yi Kwal erupted in 1624 and wrecked Joseon's military defenses in the north. Even after the rebellion had been suppressed, King Injo had to devote military forces to ensure the stability of the capital, leaving fewer soldiers to defend the northern borders.

In 1627, a Jurchen army of 30,000 led by Nurhaci's nephew Amin overran Joseon's defenses. After a quick campaign that was assisted by northern yangban who had supported Gwanghaegun, the Jurchens imposed a treaty that forced Joseon to accept "brotherly relations" with the Jurchen kingdom. Because Injo persisted in his anti-Manchu policies, Qing emperor Hong Taiji sent a punitive expedition of 120,000 men to Joseon in 1636. Defeated, King Injo was forced to end his relations with the Ming and recognize the Qing as suzerain instead. Injo's successor Hyojong of Joseon (r. 1649–1659) tried to form an army to keep his enemies away and conquer the Qing for revenge, but could never act on his designs.

Despite reestablishing economic relations by officially entering the imperial Chinese tributary system, Joseon leaders and intellectuals remained resentful of the Manchus, whom they regarded as barbarians, and regarded the Ming dynasty as the center of the civilized world. Joseon intellectuals, who had political and cultural allegiances to the Ming dynasty, were forced to reexamine their state identity when the Qing overthrew the Ming, leading to an influx of Ming refugees into Joseon. As a result, Joseon created the Little China ideology, known as sojunghwa. According to Youngmin Kim, "It held that the Joseon embodied Chineseness authentically while other neighboring countries failed to do so in the face of the barbarian domination of the center of the civilized world." A set of standardized rites and unifying symbols were developed in Late Joseon Korea to maintain that sense of cultural identity. Long after submitting to the Qing, the Joseon court and many Korean intellectuals kept using Ming reign periods.

=== Late period (mid 17th-late 19th century) ===
==== Emergence of Silhak and renaissance of the Joseon ====
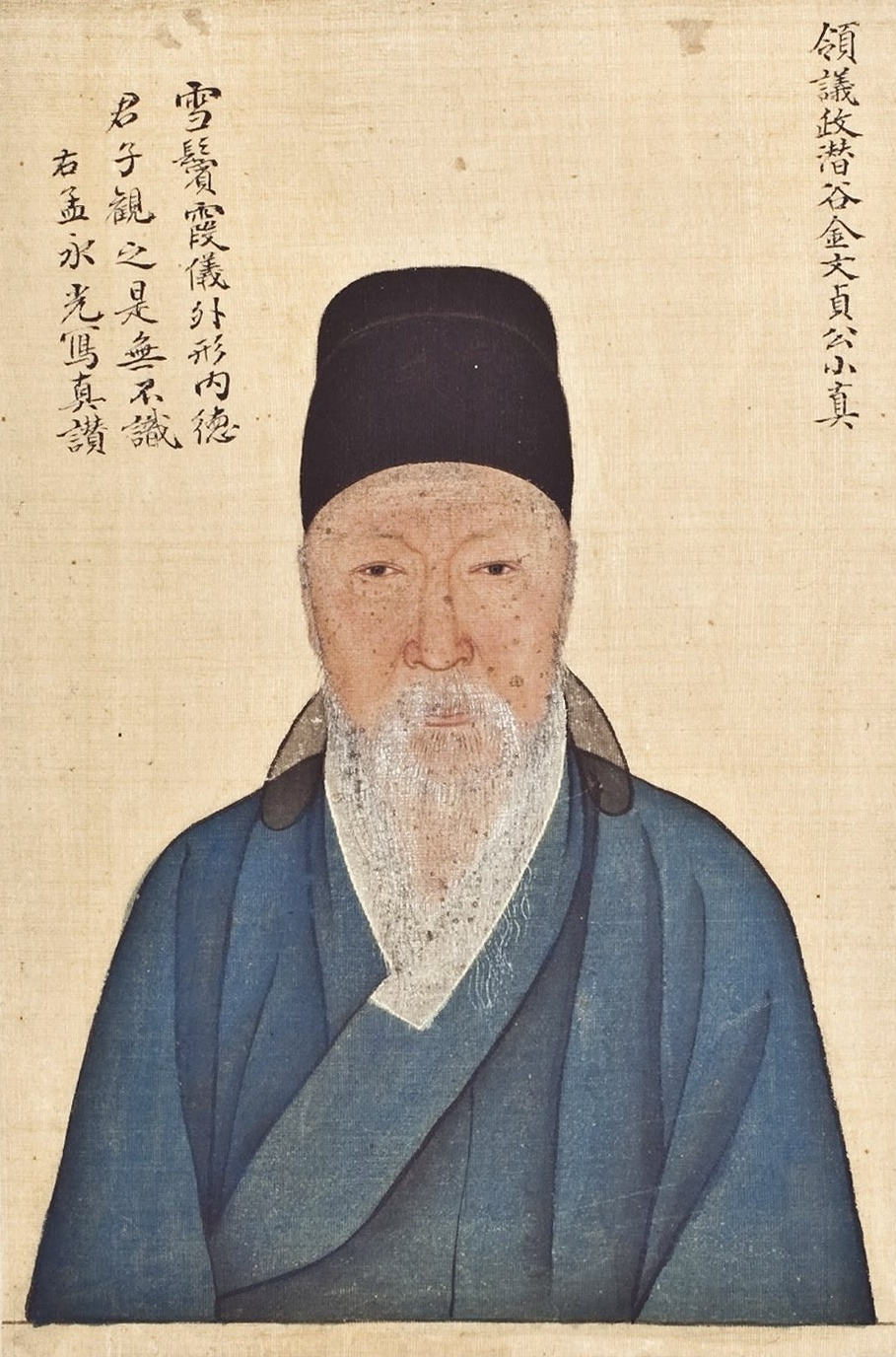
Portrait of Kim Yuk 김육 (1570–1658), an early Silhak philosopher of the Joseon period

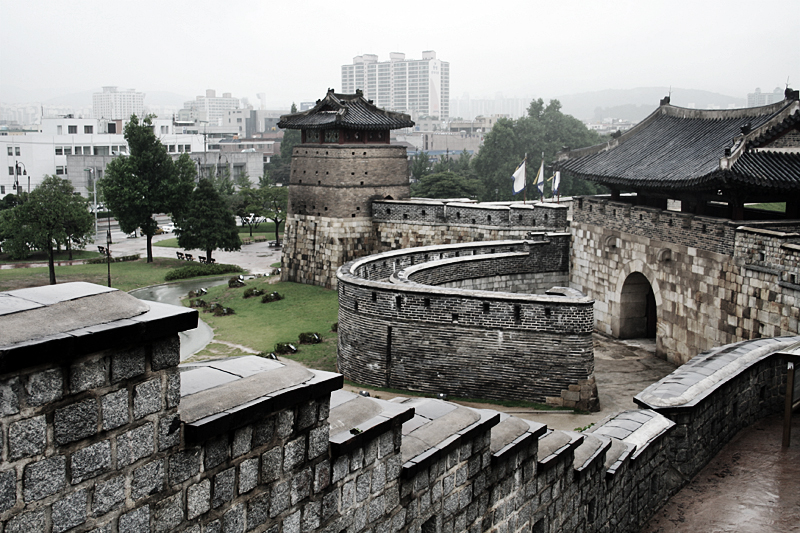
Hwaseong Fortress in Suwon. Also one of UNESCO World Heritage Sites

After invasions from Japan and Manchuria, Joseon experienced a nearly 200-year period of peace. Joseon witnessed the emergence of Silhak (Practical Learning). The early group of Silhak scholars advocated comprehensive reform of civil service examination, taxation, natural sciences and the improvement in agromanagerial and agricultural techniques. It aimed to rebuild Joseon society after it had been devastated by the two invasions. Under the leadership of Kim Yuk, the chief minister of King Hyeonjong, the implementation of reforms proved highly advantageous both to state revenues and to the lot of the peasants.

In 1666, during Hyeonjong's reign, Dutchman Hendrick Hamel left Korea after more than thirteen years of captivity. From 1670 to 1671, Korea endured a devastating famine brought on by cold weather and poor harvests. While the death toll remains difficult to measure, hundreds of thousands of Koreans may have died. In total, scholars estimate that the Kyŏngsin Famine and the Eulbyeong famine in the years 1695–1696 may have killed 23–33% of Korea's population. The countryside remained scarred by these calamities and population growth would remain depressed for most of the 18th century.

The co-existence system between Southerners and Westerners which was established after the Injo coup started to fall. After the Yesong debate, factional conflict grew particularly intense under the reigns of the kings Sukjong and Gyeongjong, with major rapid reversals of the ruling faction, known as hwanguk being commonplace. During the early reign of Sukjong, the southerners managed to become a ruling faction and made westerners lose power. But the southerners' rise to power was temporary. Sukjong, who believed that political factions would weaken the king's power started rapid reversals of the ruling faction, which resulted in bloody killings between factions. After the three bloody hwanguk, the Southerners lost their influence in the central government, and the ruling Westerners were divided into hard-line Noron who rejected the Southerners and moderate Soron who were friendly to the Southerners. This shift resulted in political radicalism which viewed other factions as the ones that should be eliminated. In response, the next kings, Yeongjo (r. 1724–1776) and Jeongjo (r. 1776–1800), generally pursued the Tangpyeongchaek – a policy of maintaining balance and equality between the factions.

The two kings led a second renaissance of the Joseon kingdom. Yeongjo's grandson, the enlightened King Jeongjo enacted various reforms throughout his reign, notably establishing Kyujanggak, a royal library to improve the cultural and political position of Joseon and to recruit gifted officers to run the nation. King Jeongjo also spearheaded bold social initiatives, opening government positions to those who would previously have been barred because of their social status. King Jeongjo had the support of many Silhak scholars. King Jeongjo's reign also saw the further growth and development of Joseon's popular culture. At that time, the group of Silhak scholars encouraged the individual to reflect on state traditions and lifestyle, initiating the studies of Korea that addressed its history, geography, epigraphy, and language.

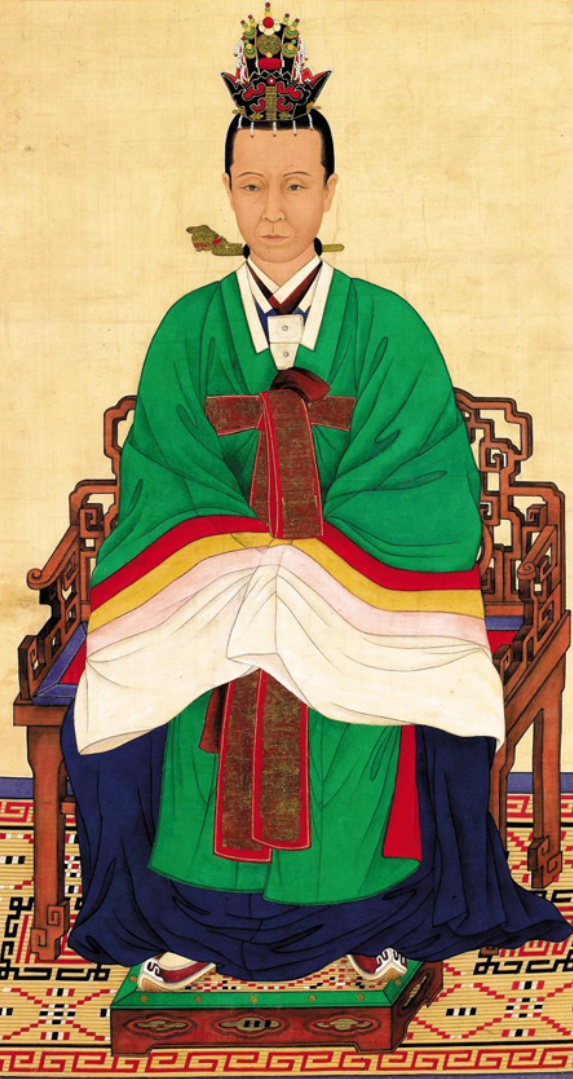
Sinjeong, Queen Regent of Joseon. She served as nominal regent of Joseon, who selected Gojong to place upon the throne.

==== Architecture ====
During the late Joseon period of the 18th and 19th centuries, Joseon started to change its perceptions of the Qing dynasty. The shift in perceptions commenced through the introduction of Qing dynasty culture to Joseon society by Yeonhaengsa, Korean envoys to the Qing dynasty. Progressive-thinking Joseon intellectuals advocated the Bukhak theory, which argued that Joseon should adopt Qing and Western culture through the Qing dynasty. Joseon scholars became intrigued by the sophisticated architectural technology of China, encompassing construction techniques, wagon utilization, and the ondol heating system. Particularly fascinated by brick, the proponents of Bukhak endeavored to popularize its usage across Joseon, and eventually succeeded. Pak Chiwŏn was among the first to construct brick Chinese-style buildings in Anui, Gyeongsang Province, and Gyedong, Seoul, towards the end of the 18th century. Following the establishment of the Suwon Hwaseong Fortress, which was influenced by Qing construction technology and techniques, Qing-style architectural style and techniques started to become more widespread in Joseon society.

==== Government by in-law families ====
After the death of King Jeongjo, the Joseon faced difficult external and internal problems. Internally, the foundation of national law and order weakened as a result of "Sedo Politics" (in-law government) by royal in-laws.

The young Sunjo succeeded his father, King Jeongjo, in 1800. With Jeongjo's death the Noron seized power with the regency of Queen Dowager Jeongsun, whose family had strong ties to the faction, and initiated a persecution of Catholics. However, after the retirement and death of the Queen Dowager, the Norons were gradually ousted, while the Andong Kim clan of Kim Jo-sun, the father of the Queen Sunwon, gained power. Gradually the Andong Kims came to dominate the court.

With the domination of the Andong Kims, the era of Sedo Politics began. The formidable in-law lineage monopolized the vital positions in government, holding sway over the political scene, and intervening in the succession of the throne. These kings had no monarchic authority and could not rule over the government. The other aristocratic families, overwhelmed by the power exercised by the royal in-laws, could not speak out. As the power was concentrated in the hands of the royal in-law lineage, there was disorder in the governing process, and corruption became rampant. Large sums were offered in bribes to the powerful lineages to obtain positions with nominally high rank. Even the low-ranking posts were bought and sold. This period, which spanned 60 years, saw the manifestation of both severe poverty among the Korean population and ceaseless rebellions in various parts of the country.

Externally, Joseon became increasingly isolationist. Its rulers sought to limit contact with foreign countries.

==== End of the dynasty ====
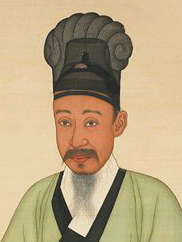
Heungseon Daewongun

In 1863, King Gojong took the throne. His father, Heungseon Daewongun, ruled for him until Gojong reached adulthood. During the mid-1860s the regent was the main proponent of isolationism and the instrument of the persecution of native and foreign Catholics, a policy that led directly to the unsuccessful French Campaign against Korea in 1866. The early years of Gojong's rule also witnessed a large effort to restore the dilapidated Gyeongbokgung, the seat of royal authority. From 1862 to 1864, an insurgency movement driven by Donghak followers and religious leader Cho'e Cheu gathered a peasant army to take over southern parts of Korea until Cheu was executed in 1864.

During Gojong's reign, the power and authority of the in-law families such as the Andong Kims sharply declined. To get rid of the Andong Kim and Pungyang Jo clans, he promoted persons without making references to political party or family affiliations, and to reduce the burdens of the people and solidify the basis of the nation's economy, he reformed the tax system. In 1871, U.S. and Korean forces clashed in a U.S. attempt at gunboat diplomacy following on the General Sherman incident of 1866.

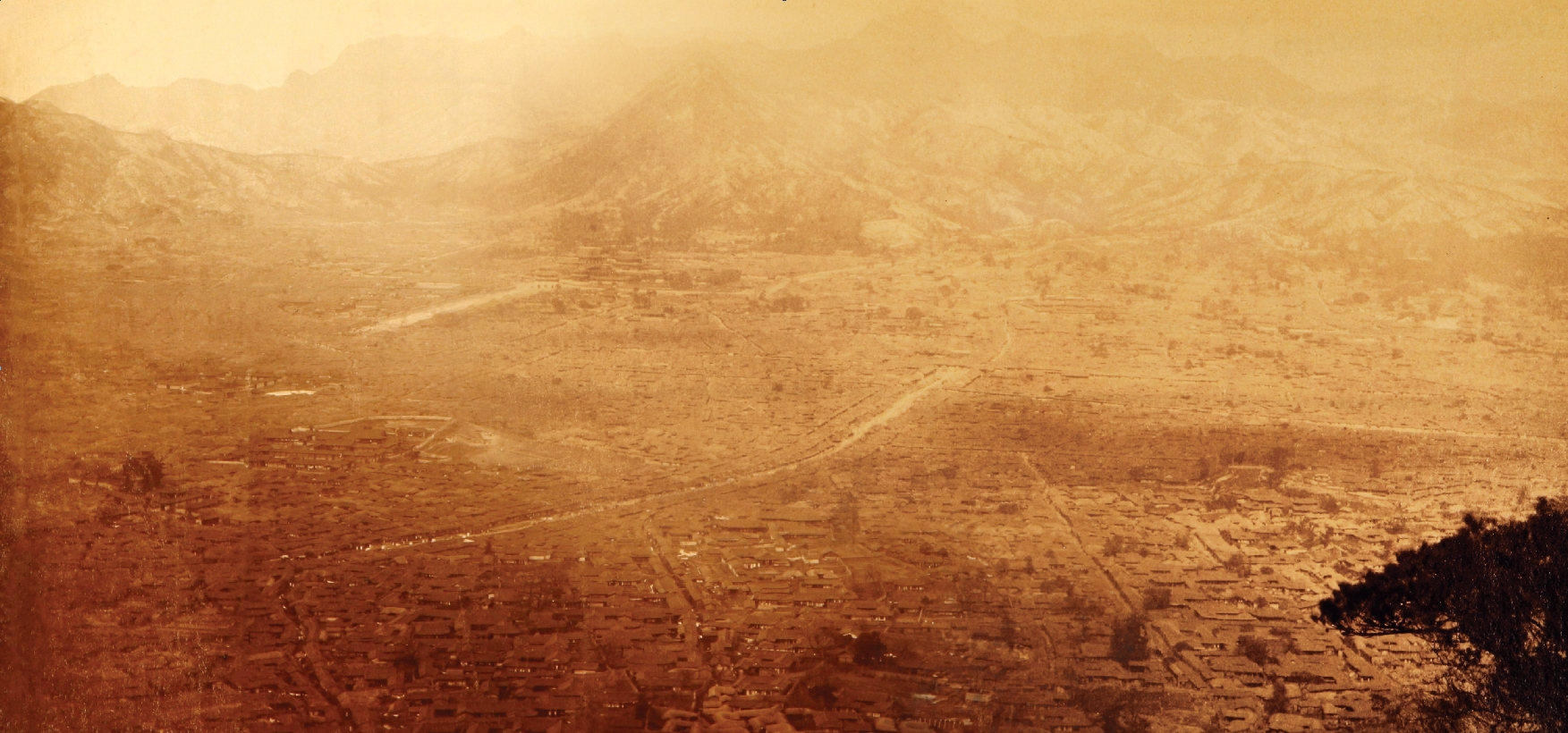
Seoul in 1884, photographed by George Clayton Foulk

In 1873, Gojong announced his assumption of royal rule. With the subsequent retirement of Daewongun, Queen Min (later called Empress Myeongseong) became a power in the court, placing her family in high court positions.

Japan, after the Meiji Restoration, acquired Western military technology and forced Joseon to sign the Treaty of Ganghwa in 1876, opening three ports to trade and granting the Japanese extraterritoriality. Port Hamilton was briefly occupied by the Royal Navy in 1885.

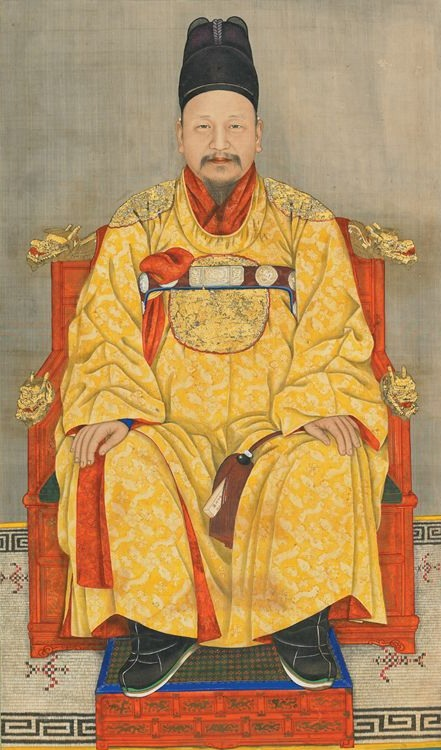
Emperor Gojong

Many Koreans despised Japanese and foreign influences over their land and what they regarded as corruption and oppression from the Joseon dynasty. In 1881, the Byeolgigun, a modern elite military unit, was formed with Japanese trainers. The salaries of the other soldiers were held back, and in 1882 rioting soldiers attacked the Japanese officers and even forced the queen to take refuge in the countryside.

In 1894, the Donghak Peasant Revolution saw farmers rise up in a mass rebellion, with peasant leader Jeon Bong-jun defeating the forces of local ruler Jo Byong-gap at the battle of Gobu on January 11, 1894; after the battle, Jo's properties were handed out to the peasants. By May, the peasant army had reached Jeonju, and the Joseon government asked the Qing dynasty government for assistance in ending the revolt. The Qing sent 3,000 troops, and the rebels negotiated a truce, but the Japanese considered the Qing presence a threat and sent in 8,000 troops of their own, seizing the Royal Palace in Seoul and installing a pro-Japanese government on June 8, 1894.

The Sino-Japanese soon escalated into a war (1894–1895) between Japan and the Qing Empire, fought largely in Korea. Gojong had made a deal with Japan, partially out of a distrust of the queen's support for open trade policies toward Western civilizations and China. He ended up preempting a specific disadvantageous, exclusive negotiation with Japan previous to the queen's decision, which was later used as a political premise for Japan to wage military action. Scholars, particularly during the Joseon era, were touted for expressing allegiance to the king. The empress had also attempted to counter Japanese interference in Korea and was considering turning to the Russian Empire and to China for support.

As a result of her machinations, in 1895 Empress Myeongseong was assassinated by Japanese agents. The Japanese minister to Korea, Lieutenant-General Viscount Miura Gorō, almost certainly orchestrated the plot against her. A group of Japanese agents entered the Gyeongbokgung Palace in Seoul, which was under Japanese control, and she was killed; her body desecrated in the north wing of the palace. The same year, the Qing acknowledged defeat in the Treaty of Shimonoseki, which officially guaranteed Korea's independence from China. It was also a step toward Japan gaining regional hegemony in Korea.

==== Establishment of the empire and colonization ====
The Joseon court, pressured by encroachment from larger powers, felt the need to reinforce national integrity and declared the Korean Empire, along with the Gwangmu Reform in 1897. King Gojong assumed the title of Emperor to assert Korea's independence. In addition, other foreign powers were sought for military technology, especially Russia, to fend off the Japanese. Technically, 1897 marked the end of the Joseon period, as the official name of the empire was changed; the Joseon dynasty still reigned, albeit perturbed by Japan and Russia.

In a complicated series of maneuvers and counter-maneuvers, Japan pushed back the Russian fleet at the Battle of Port Arthur in 1904. With the conclusion of the 1904–1905 Russo-Japanese War with the Treaty of Portsmouth, the way was open for Japan to take control of Korea. After the signing of the Protectorate Treaty in 1905, Korea became a protectorate of Japan. Prince Itō was the first Resident-General of Korea, although he was assassinated by Korean independence activist An Jung-geun in 1909 at the train station in Harbin, China. In 1910 the Japanese Empire ultimately annexed Korea.

== Government ==
Joseon was a highly centralized monarchy, and neo-Confucian bureaucracy as codified by Kyŏngguk taejŏn, a sort of Joseon constitution.

=== King ===
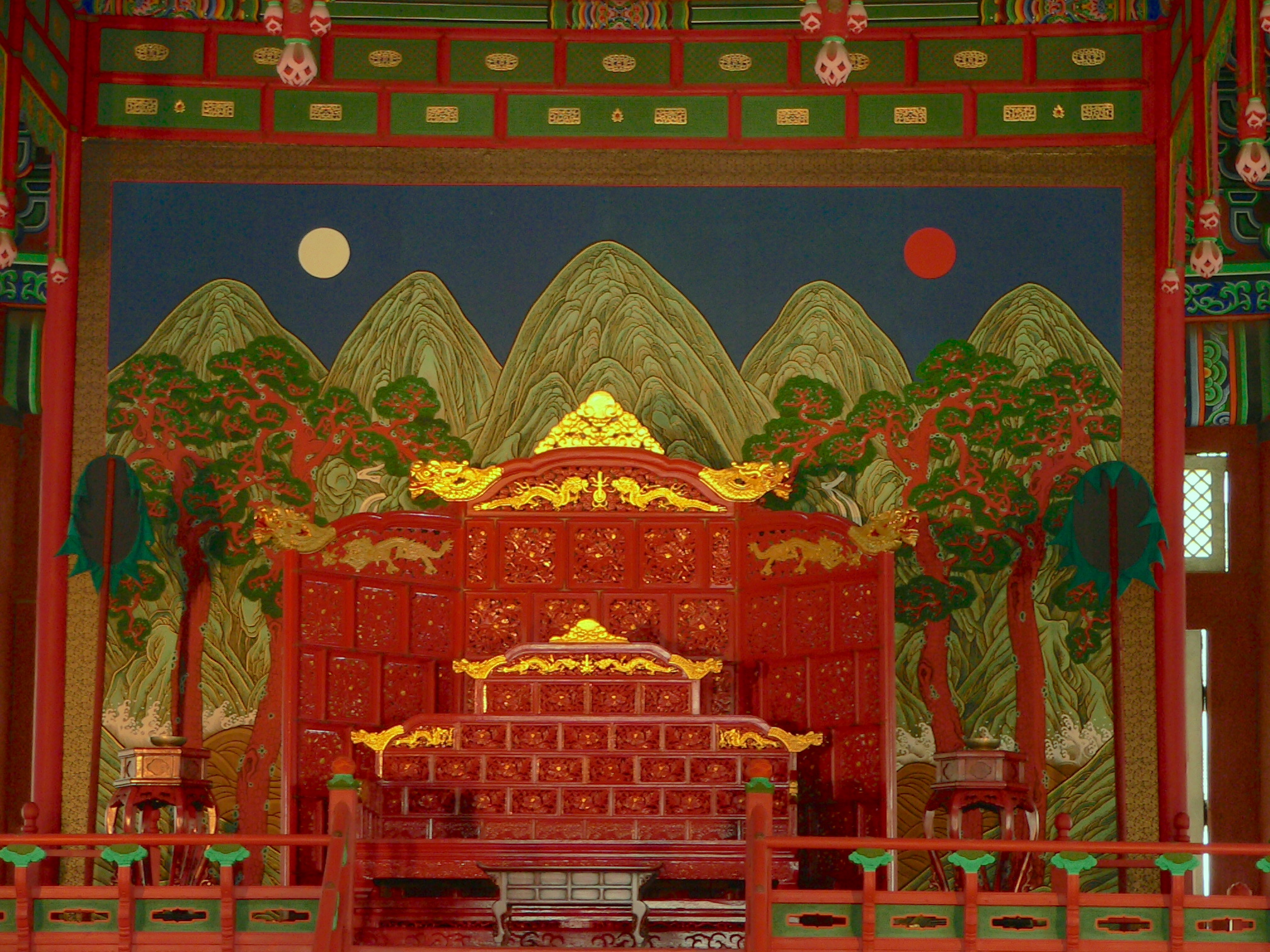
The Phoenix Throne of the king of Joseon in Gyeongbokgung The picture in the background is Irworobongdo.

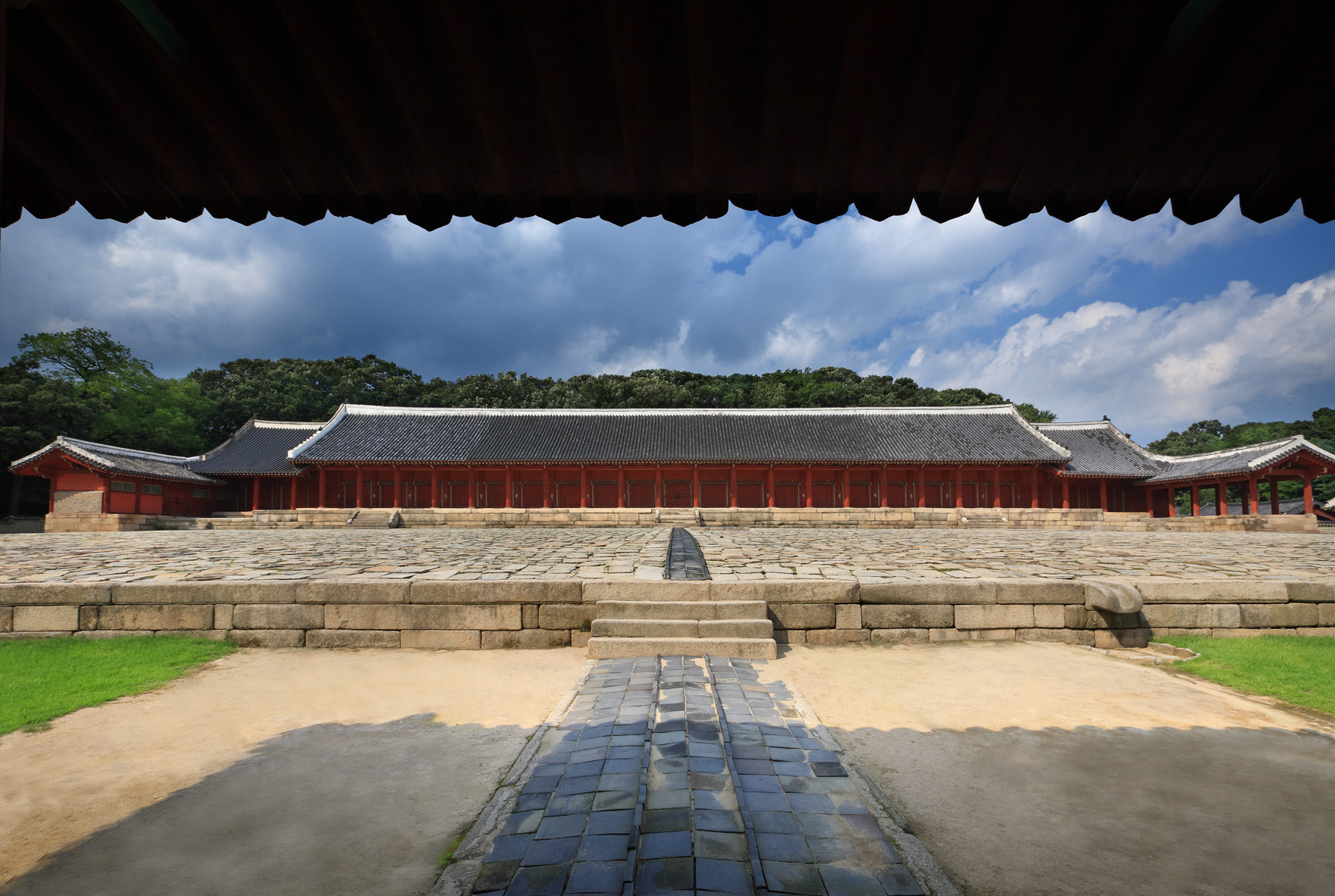
Jeongjeon of Jongmyo Shrine – As the dynasty continued, it was expanded horizontally.

The king had absolute authority, but his actual power varied with political circumstances. He was bound by tradition, precedents set by earlier kings, Kyŏngguk taejŏn, and Confucian teachings. The king commanded absolute loyalty from his officials and subjects, but the officials were also expected to persuade the king to the right path if the latter was thought to be mistaken. Natural disasters were thought to be due to the king's failings, and therefore, Joseon kings were very sensitive to their occurrences. When there was a severe drought or a series of disasters, the king often formally sought criticism from officials and the citizenry. On those occasions, critics were immune from prosecution, regardless of what they said or wrote (although there were a few exceptions).

Direct communication between the king and the common people was possible through the sangeon (상언; 上言) written petition system and the gyeokjaeng oral petition system. Through the gyeokjaeng oral petition system, commoners could strike a gong or drum in front of the palace or during the king's public processions to appeal their grievances or petition the king directly. This allowed even the illiterate members of Joseon society to make a petition to the king. More than 1,300 gyeokjaeng-related accounts are recorded in the Ilseongnok.

=== Officials ===
Government officials were ranked in 18 levels, ranging from first senior rank down to ninth junior rank. Seniority and promotion were achieved through royal decree, based on examination or recommendation. The officials from 1st senior rank to 3rd senior rank wore red robes. Those from 3rd junior rank to 6th junior rank wore blue. Those below wore green robes.

Here, "government official" means one who occupied an office which gave its holder yangban status – hereditary nobility for three generations. To become such an official, one had to pass a series of gwageo examinations. There were three kinds of gwageo exams – literary, military, and miscellaneous. The literary route was the most prestigious. Many key posts, including all Censorate posts, were open only to officials who advanced through literary exam. The literary route involved a series of four tests. To qualify, one had to pass them all. 33 candidates who were chosen in this manner would take the final exam, before the king. The candidate with the highest score was appointed to a position of 6th junior rank (a jump of six ranks). The two candidates with the next highest scores were appointed to a position of 7th junior rank. The seven candidates with next highest scores were assigned to 8th junior rank. The remaining 23 candidates were given 9th junior rank, the lowest of 18 ranks.

The officials of 1st senior rank, 1st junior rank, and 2nd senior rank were addressed with the honorific "daegam" while those of 2nd junior rank and 3rd senior rank were addressed with the honorific "yeonggam". These red-robed officials, collectively called "dangsanggwan", took part in deciding government policies by attending cabinet meetings. The rest of the ranked officials were called "danghagwan".

=== Central government ===
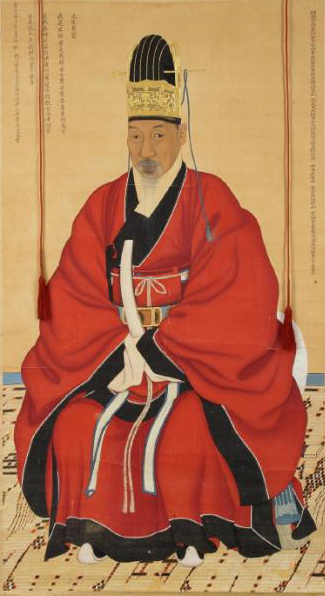
Portrait of Chief State Councillor Ch'ae Chegong (1720–1799)

==== State Council ====
State Council (Uijeongbu) was the highest deliberative body, whose power declined over the course of the period. The Chief State Councillor (Yŏngŭijŏng), Left State Councillor (Chwaŭijŏng), and Right State Councillor (Uŭijŏng) were the highest-ranking officials in the government (all three were of 1st senior rank). They were assisted by Left Minister (Jwachanseong) and Right Minister (Uichangseong), both of 1st junior rank, and seven lower-ranking officials. The power of State Council was inversely proportional to the king's power. There were periods when it directly controlled the Six Ministries, the chief executive body of Joseon government, but it primarily served in an advisory role under stronger kings. State councillors served in several other positions concurrently.

==== Six Ministries ====
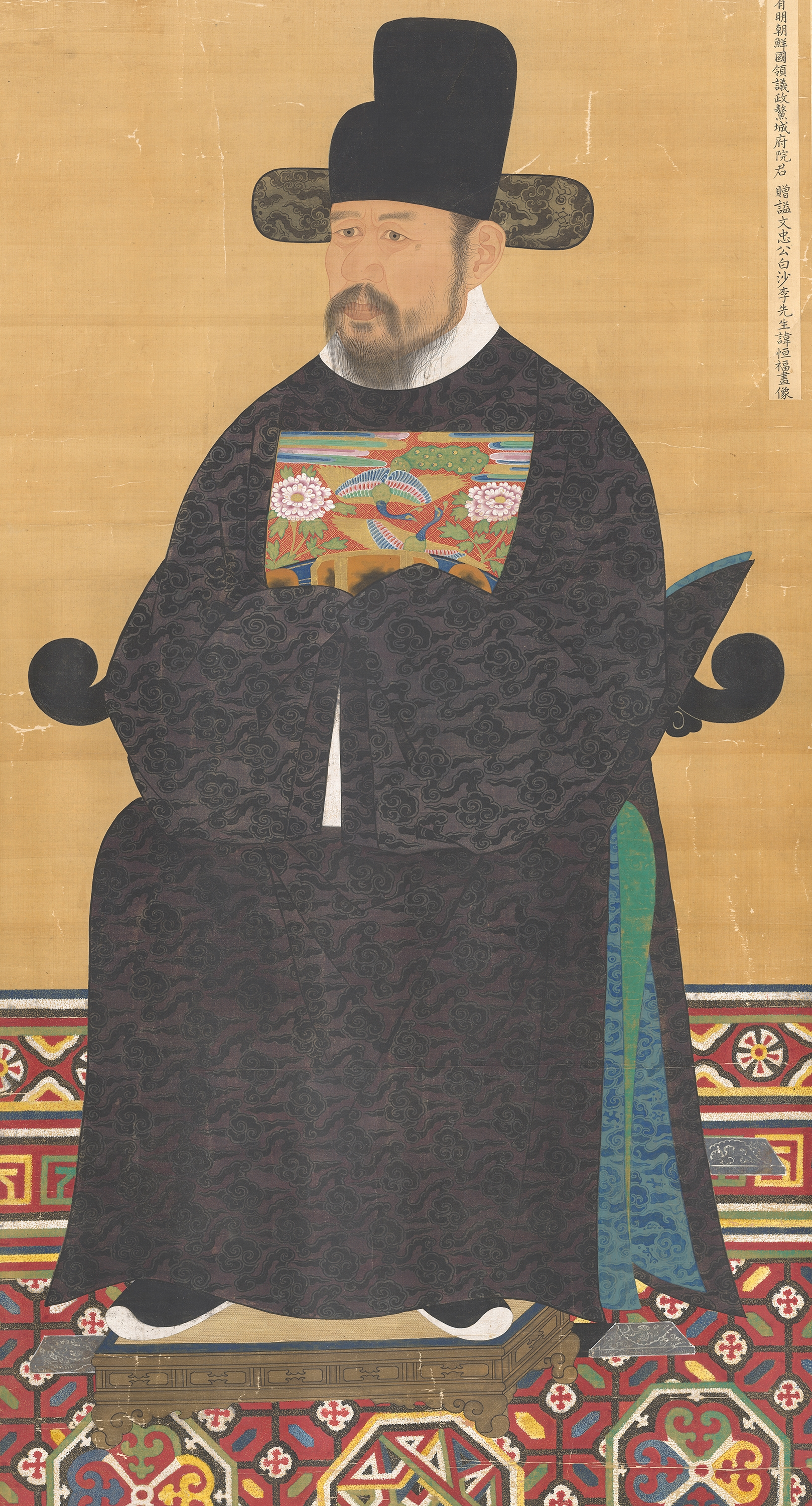
Yi Hang-bok – He was appointed and served as Byeongjo Panseo, Minister of National Defense during the Japanese invasions of Korea

Six Ministries (Yukjo) made up the chief executive body. Each minister (Panseo) was of 2nd senior rank and was assisted by a deputy minister (Champan), who was of 2nd junior rank. The Ministry of Personnel was the most senior of six ministries. As the influence of the State Council waned over time, the Minister of Personnel was often the de facto head of ministers. In order of seniority, the ministries were:

- Ministry of Personnel (Ijo) – was primarily concerned with the appointment of officials
- Ministry of Taxation (Hojo) – taxation, finances, census, agriculture, and land policies
- Ministry of Rites (Yejo) – rituals, culture, diplomacy, gwageo exam
- Ministry of Defense (Byeongjo) – military affairs
  - Office of Police Bureau (Podocheong) – office for public order
- Ministry of Justice (Hyeongjo) – administration of law, slavery, punishments
- Ministry of Commerce (Gongjo) – industry, public works, manufacturing, mining

Government offices of each organization were located where the current Gwanghwamun Plaza is located, so it was also called "Yukjo Street" after the six ministries.

==== Three Offices ====
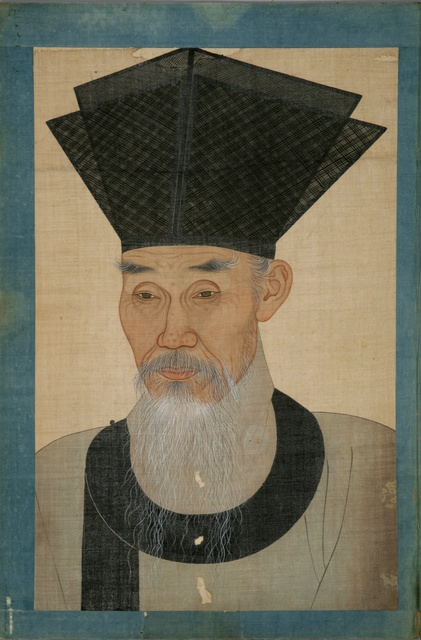
Portrait of the Inspector General Yun Ponggu (1681–1767)

Three Offices, or Samsa, is a collective name for three offices that functioned as a major organ of the press and provided checks and balances on the king and the officials. While modeled after the Chinese system, they played much more prominent roles in the Joseon government than their Chinese counterparts. In their role as organ of press, they did not have actual authority to decide or implement policies, but had influential voice in the ensuing debate.

The officials who served in these offices tended to be younger and of lower rank compared to other offices but had a strong academic reputation and enjoyed special privileges and great prestige (for instance, censors were permitted to drink during working hours because of their function of criticizing the king). To be appointed, they went through more thorough review of character and family background. Three Offices provided the fastest route of promotion to high posts and was almost a requirement to becoming a State Councillor.

- Office of the Inspector General (Sahŏnbu) – It monitored government administration and officials at each level in both central and local governments for corruption, malfeasance, or inefficiency. It was also in charge of advancing public morals and Confucian customs and redressing grievances of the populace. It was headed by Inspector General (Daesaheon), a position of 2nd junior rank, who oversaw 30 largely independent officials.
- Office of Censors (Saganwon) – Its chief function was to remonstrate with the king if there was wrong or improper action or policy. Important decrees of the king were first reviewed by censors, who could ask for them to be withdrawn if they judged them improper. It also issued opinions about the general state of affairs. It was composed of five officials, led by the Chief Censor (Daesagan), of 3rd senior rank.

While the primary focus for Office of Inspector General is the government officials and Office of Censors is focused on the king, two offices often performed each other's functions, and there was much overlap. Together they were called "Yangsa", which literally means "Both Offices", and often worked jointly especially when they sought to reverse the king's decision.

- Office of Special Advisors (Hongmun'gwan) – It oversaw the royal library and served as research institute to study Confucian philosophy and answer the king's questions. Its officials took part in the daily lessons called gyeongyeon, in which they discussed history and Confucian philosophy with the king. Since these discussions often led to commentary on current political issues, its officials had significant influence as advisors. It was headed by Chief Scholar (Daejehak), a part-time post of 2nd senior rank that served concurrently in another high post (such as in State Council), and Deputy Chief Scholar (Bujehak), a full-time post of 3rd senior rank that actually ran the office. There was great prestige attached to being Chief Scholar in this deeply Confucian society. The office was established to replace Hall of Worthies (Jiphyeonjeon) after the latter was abolished by King Sejo in the aftermath of Six martyred ministers.

==== Other offices ====
The major offices include the following:

- Royal Secretariat (Seungjeongwon) served as a liaison between the king and the Six Ministries. There were six royal secretaries, one for each ministry, and all were of the 3rd senior rank. Their primary role was to pass down royal decrees to the ministries and submit petitions from the officials and the populace to the king, but they also advised the king and served in other key positions close to the king. In particular the Chief Royal Secretary, a liaison to the Ministry of Personnel, served the king in the closest proximity of all government officials and often enjoyed great power that was derived from the king's favor. Hong Guk-yeong (during Jeongjo's reign) and Han Myŏnghoe (during Sejo) are some examples of chief royal secretaries who were the most powerful officials of their time.
- Capital Bureau (Hanseongbu) was in charge of running the capital, Hanseong (now Seoul). It was led by Panyoon, of the 2nd senior second rank equivalent to today's mayor of Seoul.
- Royal Investigation Bureau (Uigeumbu) was an investigative and enforcement organ under direct control of the king. It chiefly dealt with treason and other serious cases that concerned the king and royal family and served to arrest, investigate, imprison, and carry out sentences against the suspected offenders, who were often government officials.
- Office of Records (Ch'unch'ugwan) officials wrote, compiled, and maintained the government and historical records. It was headed by State Councillors, and many posts were held by officials serving in other offices concurrently. There were eight historiographers whose sole function was to record the meetings for history.
- Sungkyunkwan or Royal Academ prepared future government officials. Those who passed the first two stages of the gwageo examinations (literary exam) were admitted to Sungkyunkwan. The class size was usually 200 students, who lived in the residential hall and followed a strict routine and school rules. It also served as the state shrine for Confucian and Korean Confucian sages. The students' opinions on government policies, especially collective statements and demonstrations, could be influential as they represented the fresh and uncorrupted consensus of young scholars. The official in charge was Daesaseong of 3rd senior rank, and 36 other officials including those from other offices were involved in running the academy.

=== Local government ===
The officials of high rank were sent from the central government. Sometimes a secret royal inspector (Amhaengeosa) was appointed by the king to travel incognito and monitor the provincial officials. These undercover inspectors were generally young officials of lower rank but were invested with the royal authority to dismiss corrupt officials.

- Provinces (Do) – There were eight provinces, each of which was governed by a Governor (Gwanchalsa), a position of 2nd junior rank.
- Bu – administrative offices in charge of major cities in provinces. Each bu was led by Buyun, which was equivalent to Governor in rank.
- Mok– There were twenty moks, which governed large counties named ju. They were run by Moksa, of the 3rd senior rank.
- County (Gun) – There were eighty counties in Joseon, each governed by Gunsu, a 4th junior rank.
- Hyeon – Large hyeons were governed by Hyeonryeong of 5th junior rank while smaller hyeons were governed by Hyeongam of 6th junior rank.

=== Administrative divisions ===
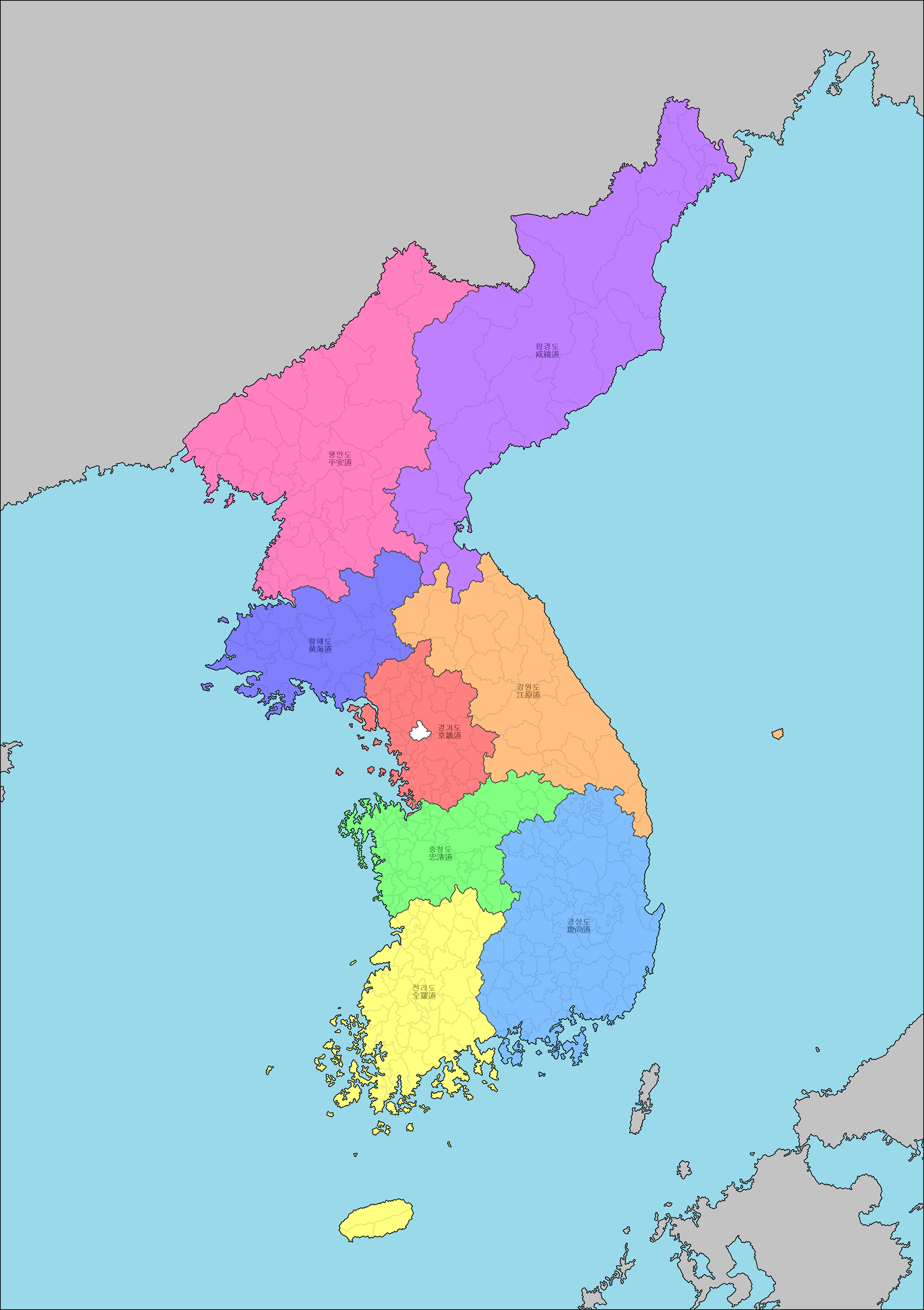
The eight provinces of Joseon

During most of the Joseon period, Korea was divided into eight provinces (do). The eight provinces' boundaries remained unchanged for almost five centuries from 1413 to 1895, and formed a geographic paradigm that is still reflected today in the Korean Peninsula's administrative divisions, dialects, and regional distinctions. The names of all eight provinces are still preserved today, in one form or another.

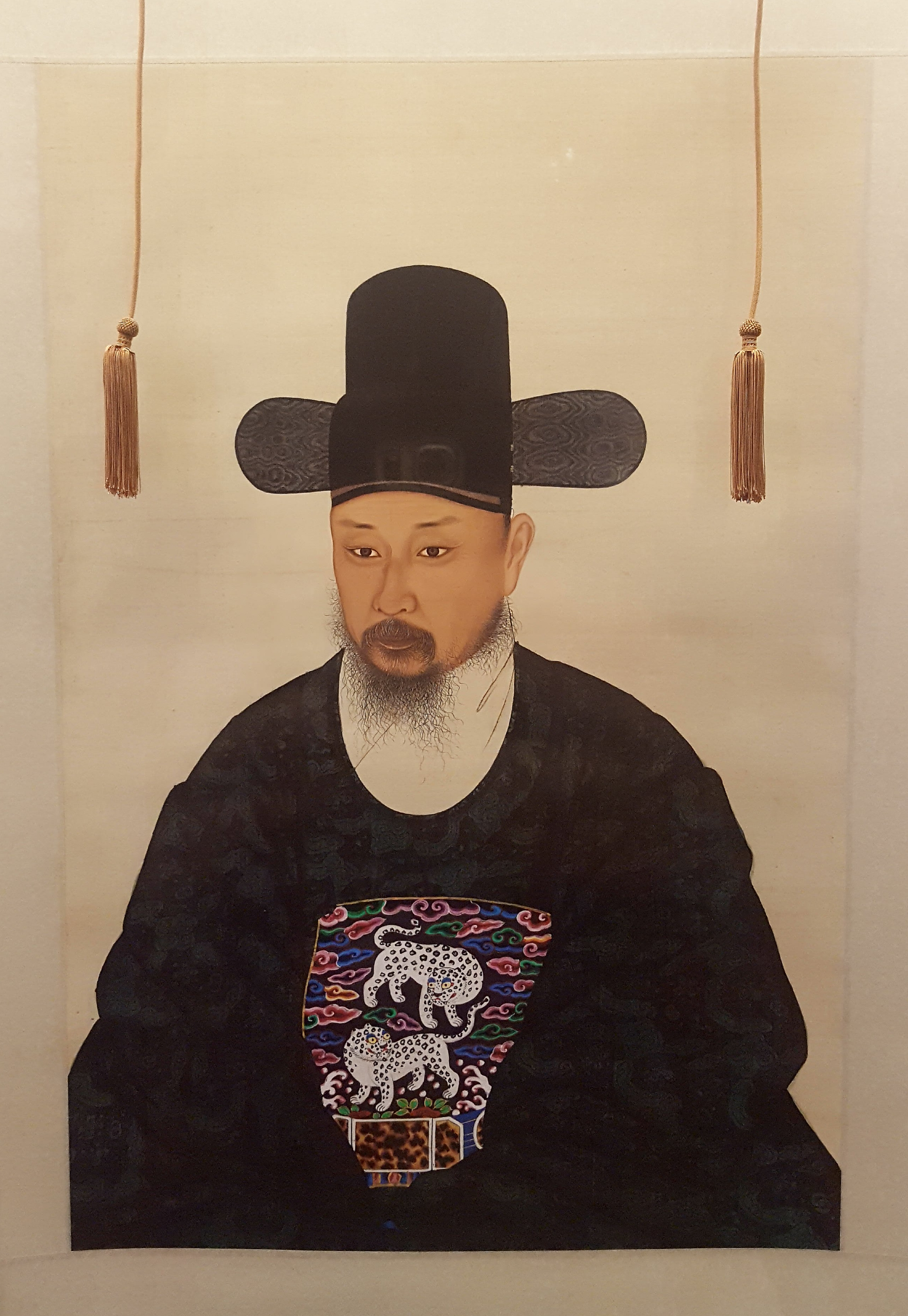
Portrait of Kim Hu (1751–1805), a military officer of the Joseon dynasty

=== Military ===
==== Army ====
The army consists of the central army and the provincial armies. Each was made of peasant soldiers, cavalry, pengbaesu and gabsa elite soldiers, archers, musketeers, and artillery. The king appointed their generals.

==== Navy ====
The Joseon Navy consisted of two types of main warships, the panokseon and the turtle ship. They also used small vessels and fishing boats for reconnaissance and landings. The king also appoints their admirals.

==== Royal Guard ====
The Naegeumwi were royal guards defending the king, queen, and ministers. These were soldiers hand-selected by the king. The King's Royal Palace Gatekeepers, the Wanggung Sumunjang were a royal guard unit tasked with defending the gates of the five palaces and Hanseong's city gates.

== Foreign relations ==
Joseon was a tributary state of China that was ritually subordinate to the Ming dynasty and Qing dynasty but exercised a high level of independence and sovereignty. The ruling Yi family proclaimed their indigenous legitimacy but institutionalized structures that limited Joseon monarch power, which modern scholars view as producing contradictory statuses from a modern view of sovereignty. Joseon maintained the highest position among China's tributary states, which also included countries such as Japan, Vietnam, Ryukyu, Burma, Thailand, Laos, Brunei, and the Philippines, among others. In addition, Joseon received tribute from Jurchens and Sō clan of Tsushima until the 17th century, and had a small enclave in the Ryukyu Kingdom that engaged in trade with Siam and Java.

=== China ===
==== Ming dynasty ====
In 1392, General Yi Sŏng-gye led a successful coup to take political power in Korea from the King. General Yi's followers forced him to take the crown as Taejo of Joseon, thus establishing a new dynasty. In search of a justification for its rule given the lack of a royal bloodline, the new regime wanted recognition from other countries such as China. Furthermore, the only way to establish diplomatic relations and trade with China was to accept the tributary system of China. Thus, Joseon joined the Imperial Chinese tributary system in 1401 within the context of the Mandate of Heaven, in return for recognition. Within this tributary system, China assumed the role of a "big brother", with Korea maintaining the highest position among the tributary states, which also included countries such as the Ashikaga shogunate, Ryukyu Kingdom, Lan Xang, Đại Việt, and the Ayutthaya Kingdom, in return for accepting the subordinate tributary role of a "younger brother". A series of diplomatic ventures illustrate the persistence of Joseon's sadae (serving the great or serving Ming China) diplomacy in dealings with Ming dynasty. Sadae construes China as the center of a Confucian moral universe and describes a foreign policy characterized by the various ways a weaker nation-state such as Korea acknowledges the strength of a greater power such as China. Sadae is made manifest in the actions of the weaker nation-state as it conveys goodwill and respect through its envoys. Sadaejuui conflates an attitude of subservience with the political realism which accompanies the prudent recognition of greater power. As a foundation of diplomacy, the Joseon kingdom presumed that the Korean state was positioned within a Sinocentristic milieu.

During the 1400s, the connection between Ming and Joseon was mainly pragmatic and somewhat contractual based on the concept of Sadae, which implied a commitment to serve Ming China due to their greater power. However, historian Ji-Young Lee argues that Joseon compliance with the Ming tributary system was not merely acceptance of hegemonic practices by the most powerful state or predicated solely on material interests, but specifically entrenched in a Confucian worldview centered on the Ming dynasty as opposed to the Qing dynasty, led by the Manchus. By the early 1500s, Joseon elites began to regard the Ming emperor not just as a suzerain but also as a ritual father figure, reinforcing the relationship between the Ming and Joseon through a father-son dynamic. This transformation held significant weight because unlike the interchangeable loyalty to a ruler, the Confucian principle of filial piety was considered immutable and irrevocable. The Joseon historian Choe Bu referred to his country and the Ming as "one family". Joseon envoys and officials seem to have held genuine fondness for the Ming emperor in contrast with the Qing. The Joseon kings would sometimes send more than the necessary amount of tributary missions and occasionally hold memorial services for deceased Ming emperors to increase their political legitimacy at home. In contrast, when the Qing addressed their ruler as emperor in a letter to Joseon, the Korean envoy refused to deliver it, and another refused to attend the Qing emperor's coronation, for which he was punished with a beating. While Joseon requested permission to send more than the requested amount of tributary missions, during which China was obligated to give gifts of higher value than the tribute itself, these tribute missions were kept to a minimum during the early Qing period and no memorials were held for Qing emperors.

The lasting effect of the Ming-Joseon relationship on the Joseon elites endured well beyond the collapse of the Ming dynasty in the mid-1600s, molding the prevailing political and intellectual developments within Joseon Korea. This influence is evident in the construction of the Taebodan, the Altar of Great Gratitude, and the Mandongmyo, an Eastern Shrine dedicated to Ming emperors, within Korea. These structures, erected in 1704 within a palace courtyard and a local private academy respectively, served as tributes to the memory of selected Ming emperors, to honor the memory of specific Ming emperors.

==== From Ming to Qing dynasty ====
During the 17th century, the Qing dynasty conquered the Ming dynasty, and Joseon's perceptions of the Qing dynasty were significantly influenced by Sungmyeongbancheong (崇明反淸), which means worship of the Ming and disdain for Qing, prior to the middle of the 18th century. During the early Qing period, the Joseon dynasty was characterized by strong anti-Qing sentiments and allegiance to the Ming dynasty. According to the Veritable Records of the Joseon Dynasty, Joseon regarded the Ming dynasty as its ancestral homeland and considered the Qing dynasty barbaric, maintaining loyalty to the Ming for a period even after its collapse. Due to their adherence to the China-centric perspective called Hwai-gwan, intellectuals in Joseon held profound disdain for the Qing dynasty. Despite military invasions and the collapse of the Ming, Joseon was reluctant to accept the Qing as a replacement for the Ming at this time.

China [Ming Dynasty] is the mother and father of our country; thus, those barbarians [Qing Dynasty] are the enemy of our parents. As a civil servant, how can you abandon your parents and become the brother of your parents' enemy? The work [Ming's help to Joseon] during the Imjinwaeran (Japanese invasion of Joseon, 1592) was thanks to the power of the [Ming] emperor. It is difficult to forget the grace of the emperor as long as our country lives and breathes. ... we [Joseon Dynasty] shall not abandon our loyalty even if our country disappears (Injo of Joseon Citation 1636).

The early Qing dynasty closely monitored the dynamics within Korea for such things, showing good control abilities, and upon detecting even the slightest disturbance, dispatched envoys to investigate. Although Korea vehemently criticized the Qing dynasty ideologically and culturally, it never engaged in any substantial anti-Qing activities. Even during the Revolt of the Three Feudatories (1673–1681) within China, Korea remained inactive.

The Qing dynasty's initial high-pressure policy towards Joseon was intended to suppress anti-Qing factions in Joseon and prevent them from significantly impacting bilateral relations. However, these high-pressure policies were temporary and shifted to a consistent approach to remove Korea's inner barriers and dissolve its hatred through appeasement that emphasized benevolence and morality. Moral influence has always been a tactic used by successive Chinese suzerain states towards their vassal or tributary states. After entering China proper, the moral transformation policy, known as Dehua (德化), was adopted by the Qing dynasty towards Joseon. The policy mainly manifested in the following aspects: returning hostages, reducing annual tribute, and treating the Korean king and envoys with great courtesy. At the same time, the Qing strictly controlled its envoys to Korea while fulfilling all of Joseon's requests, thereby eliminating the barriers between China and Korea and winning their sincere submission. The Qing understood that the key to its Dehua policy lay in winning over the hearts and minds of the Koreans. This policy was consistently implemented throughout most of the Qing dynasty.

A significant manifestation of the Qing dynasty's benevolence towards Joseon was the reduction or exemption of its annual tribute, thus easing Korea's burden. The annual tribute from Joseon to the Qing was established in 1637 during Hong Taiji's invasion of Joseon, but it was frequently reduced or exempted thereafter. This was a very important policy of moral influence implemented by Qing China. In terms of diplomatic etiquette, Joseon was extremely respectful to the Qing, a trait that the Kangxi Emperor appreciated. During the reign of the Qianlong Emperor, the Northern Learning School (北學派) emerged in Joseon. This shift in mindset signified the Joseon's acceptance of the Qing dynasty. According to scholars of the Northern Learning School, Joseon should actively learn from Qing China in order to make itself prosperous and powerful, as the Qing was the only channel for Joseon to learn. The rise of the Northern Learning School marked a turning point in Qing-Joseon relations, indicating a substantial shift in Joseon's identification with the Qing dynasty.

Following the rise of the "Northern Learning" (北學) movement, Joseon attitudes toward the Qing dynasty gradually became more favorable, and the terminology used to describe the dynasty evolved accordingly. During the later years of the reign of Jeongjo of Joseon, the Veritable Records of the Joseon Dynasty began to refer to the Qing dynasty as Zhongguo (中國) instead of "Qing state" (淸國). King Jeongjo referred to the Siku Quanshu of Zhongguo (China) instead of that of the Qing state. This usage was likewise adopted by many Korean scholars and intellectuals. By the time of the First Opium War (1839–1842), diplomatic reports submitted by Joseon envoys routinely identified the Qing as Zhongguo and employed expressions such as "Imperial Edict" (皇旨), reflecting a style of official terminology that no longer distinguished the Qing from the Ming dynasty.

As it had done for about two centuries, Joseon maintained steady ties with Qing China in the early 19th century. When Westerners first arrived in Korea in the 19th century, they saw a nation shrouded in China's shadow, and it appeared to them that Korea refused to open its borders without China's consent. Although the traditional Sino-Korean relationship appeared to offer nothing more than a diplomatic dead end to Western observers, both China and Korea claimed to be acting in accordance with the rules of the relationship that had bound the two nations in peace and harmony for many centuries.

At the time of the 1882 Imo Incident, the Qing dynasty had a laissez-faire policy toward Joseon; despite being a tributary state of China, Joseon was largely independent in its internal and external affairs, and China usually did not manipulate or interfere in them. After the Imo Incident, China abandoned its laissez-faire policy, signed the China–Korea Treaty of 1882, and became directly involved in the affairs of Joseon.

During this period, Joseon also adopted the Qing dynasty's reign titles in treaties concluded with foreign powers. For example, the Korea–United Kingdom Treaty of 1883 was dated "the 492nd year since the founding of Great Joseon, corresponding to the 27th day of the 10th month in the 9th year of the reign of China's Guangxu Emperor" (大朝鮮國開國四百九十二年，即中國光緖九年十月二十七日). The use of reign years of Qing China in such diplomatic documents reflected Joseon's formal political recognition of Qing authority. At the same time, it illustrated a broader ideological shift, as the Qing had come to be widely acknowledged as culturally China (Zhongguo) within mainstream Joseon intellectual thought. While they did not forget the Ming dynasty, they had already downplayed this sentiment.

==== Sino-Korean relationship after the Imo Incident ====
After the Imo Incident in 1882, early reform efforts in Korea suffered a major setback. In the aftermath of the incident, the Chinese reasserted their influence over the peninsula, where they began to interfere in Korean internal affairs directly. After stationing troops at strategic points in the capital Seoul, the Chinese undertook several initiatives to gain significant influence over the Korean government. The Qing dispatched two special advisers on foreign affairs representing Chinese interests to Korea: the German Paul Georg von Möllendorff, a close confidant of Li Hongzhang, and the Chinese diplomat Ma Jianzhong. The Chinese supervised the creation of a Korean Maritime Customs Service headed by von Möllendorff. A staff of Chinese officers also took over the training of the army, providing the Koreans with 1,000 rifles, two cannons, and 10,000 rounds of ammunition. Furthermore, the Chingunyeong (Capital Guards Command), a new Korean military formation, was created and trained along Chinese lines by Yuan Shikai.

In October 1882, the two countries signed the China–Korea Treaty of 1882, and Korea was reduced to a semi-colonial tributary state of China with King Gojong unable to appoint diplomats without Chinese approval, and with troops stationed in the country to protect Chinese interests. (Note: A Korean historian stated that "the Chinese government began to turn its former tributary state into a semi-colony and its policy toward Korea substantially changed to a new imperialistic one where the suzerain state demanded certain privileges in her vassal state".) In 1884, Qing China obtained concessions in Korea, such as the Chinese concession of Incheon. China's new policy toward Joseon was set by Li Hongzhang and implemented by Yuan Shikai. According to Ming-te Lin: "Li's control of Korea from 1885 to 1894 through Yuan Shikai as resident official represented an anachronistic policy of intervention toward Korea."

=== Gyorin ===
This long-term, strategic policy contrasts with the gyorin (kyorin) (neighborly relations) diplomacy in dealings with Jurchens, Japan, Ryukyu Kingdom, Siam and Java. Gyorin was applied to a multi-national foreign policy. The unique nature of these bilateral diplomatic exchanges evolved from a conceptual framework developed by the Chinese. Gradually, the theoretical models would be modified, mirroring the evolution of a unique relationship.

==== Japan ====
As an initial step, a diplomatic mission was dispatched to Japan in 1402. The Joseon envoy sought to bring about the re-establishment of amicable relations between the two countries and he was charged to commemorate the good relations which existed in ancient times. This mission was successful, and shōgun Ashikaga Yoshimitsu was reported to have been favorably impressed by this initial embassy. Not less than 70 diplomatic missions were dispatched from the Joseon capital to Japan before the beginning of Japan's Edo period.

Reciprocal missions were construed as a means of communication between Korean kings and Japanese shōguns of almost equal ranking. The emperors of Japan at the time were figureheads with no actual political or military power, and the actual political and military rulers of Japan that Joseon communicated with were the shoguns who were represented as Tycoon of Japan in many foreign communications to avoid the conflict with the Sinocentric system in which the emperor of China was the highest authority, and all rulers of tributary states were known as "kings".

== Society ==
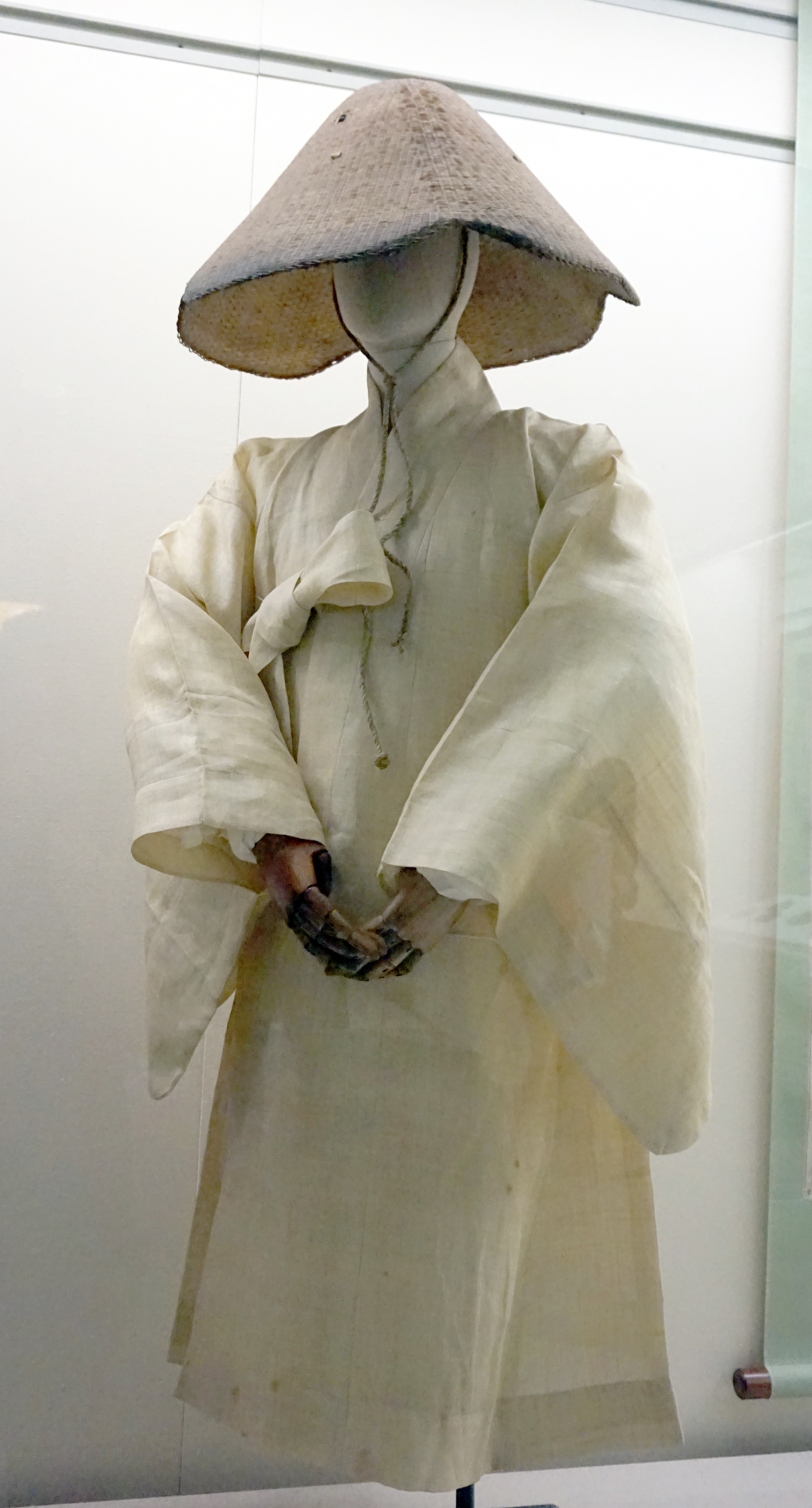
Woman's mourning clothes in Joseon

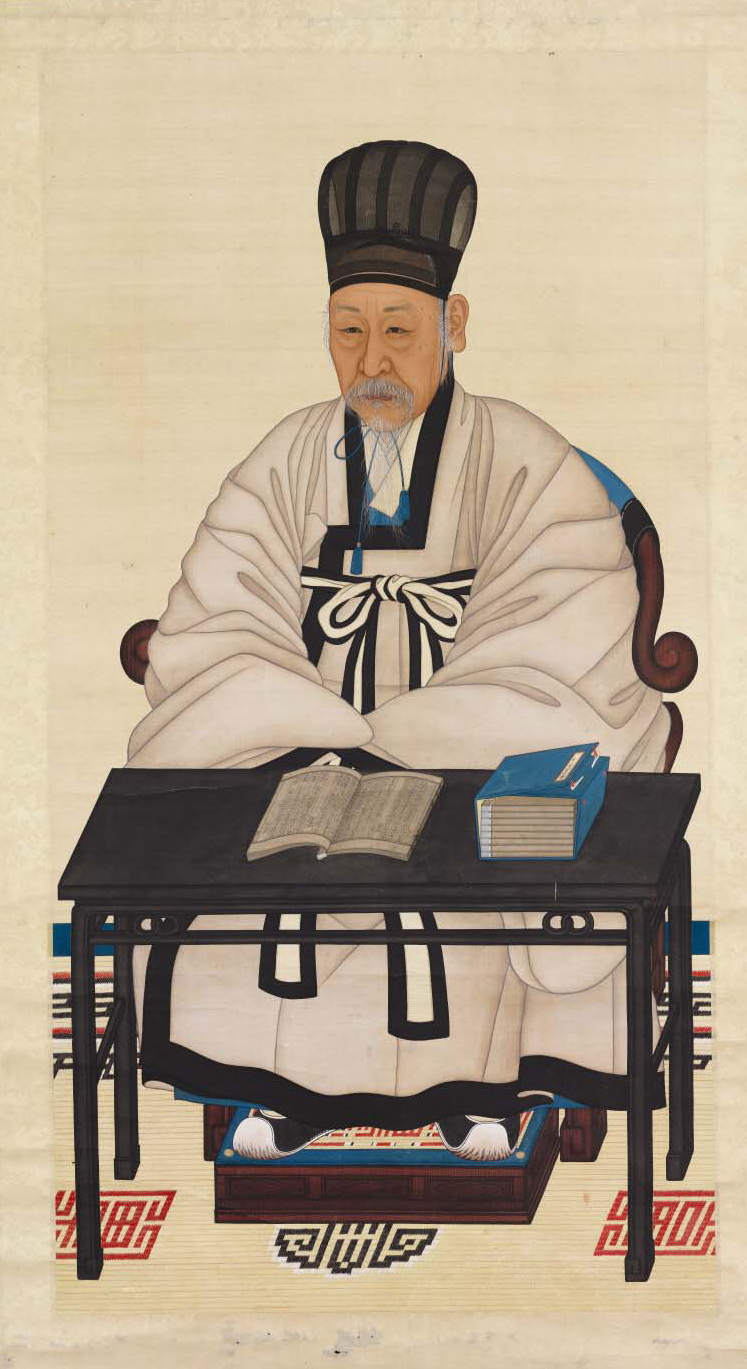
A portrait of a civil bureaucrat in the Joseon period

The exact population figures of Joseon-era Korea are disputed as government records of households are considered unreliable in this period. Between 1810 and 1850, the population declined approximately 10% and remained stable. Before the introduction of modern medicine by the Korean Empire government in the early 20th century, the average life expectancy for peasant and commoner Korean males was 24 years and for females 26 years, accounting for infant mortality.

Joseon Korea installed a centralized administrative system controlled by civil bureaucrats and military officers who were collectively called yangban. By the end of the 18th century, the yangban had acquired most of the traits of a hereditary nobility except that the status was based on a unique mixture of family position, gwageo examinations for Confucian learning, and a civil service system. The family of a yangban who did not succeed in becoming a government official for the third generation lost their yangban status and became commoners. For the most part, the only way to become a government official was to pass a series of gwageo exams (one had to pass the "lesser gwageo" exam (소과) in both of two stages to qualify for the greater gwageo exam, which again one had to pass in both of two stages to become a government official). The yangban and the king, in an uneasy balance, controlled the central government and military institutions. The proportion of yangban may have reached as high as 30% by 1800, due to the later practices of transaction of yangban status to peasants, although there was considerable local variation. As the government was small, a great many yangban were local gentry of high social status, but not always of high income.

Another portion of the population was slaves or serfs (nobi), "low-borns" (cheonmin) or untouchable outcastes (baekjeong). Slavery in Korea was hereditary, as well as a form of legal punishment. The nobi were socially indistinct from freemen other than the ruling yangban class, and some possessed property rights, legal entities and civil rights. Hence, some scholars argue that it is inappropriate to call them "slaves", while some scholars describe them as serfs. There were both government- and privately owned nobi, and the government occasionally gave them to yangban. Privately owned nobi could be inherited as personal property. During poor harvests, many sangmin people would voluntarily become nobi to survive. The nobi population could fluctuate up to about one-third of the population, but on average the nobi made up about 10% of the total population. Joseon slaves could, and often did, own property. Private slaves could buy their freedom.

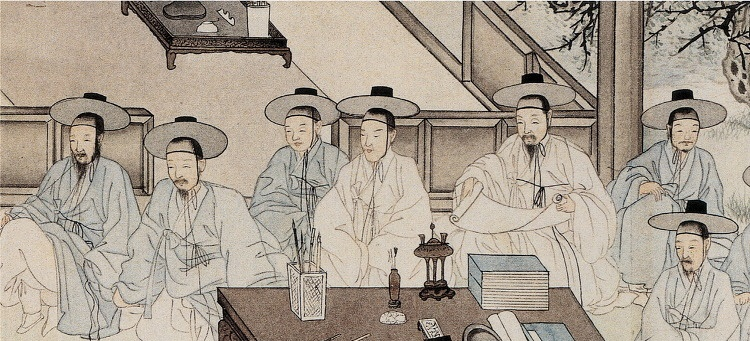
A Joseon painting which represents the Chungin (literally "middle people"), equivalent to the petite bourgeoisie

Many of the remaining 40–50% of the population were surely farmers, but recent work has raised important issues about the size of other groups: merchants and traders, local government or quasi-governmental clerks (Jungin), craftsmen and laborers, textile workers, etc. Given the size of the population, it may be that a typical person had more than one role. Most farming was, at any rate, commercial, not subsistence. In addition to generating additional income, a certain amount of occupational dexterity may have been required to avoid the worst effects of an often heavy and corrupt tax system.

Gender roles tightened during the Joseon period compared to the Goryeo era. The influence of Neo-Confucianism contributed to the increasingly male-dominated society of the time. Women were expected to be silent and not socialize with men who were not their relatives. They were required to be chaste to their husbands, and widows were not allowed to remarry. Any doubt of a woman's chastity would bring dishonor to the family. To protect the family's honor, young girls would carry a small knife (paedo), and with this they were expected to take their own lives if they were raped or even rumored to be caught in an affair. Laws were also enacted to prohibit women from riding horses or playing sports.

Marriage during the Joseon period reflected Neo-Confucian societal norms. Yangban families would arrange marriages with similar status in order to maintain lineage and social standing. The union between husband and the primary wife was central to the household, relationships the husband had with concubines were considered subordinate. Scholar-officials later devised and instituted a law making clear distinctions between the primary wife and concubines.

Sons born to yangban fathers and their concubines were known as secondary sons and held a lower status than sons born to a primary wife. Despite having blood from their yangban fathers, secondary sons were socially outcast due to their mother's lineage as well as barred from yangban family status. Secondary sons had restrictions on their advancement and could not hold positions in high government. They also were excluded from the civil service examinations. The restrictions placed on secondary sons during the Joseon period reflected the importance placed on legitimate birth and lineage due to Neo-Confucian values.

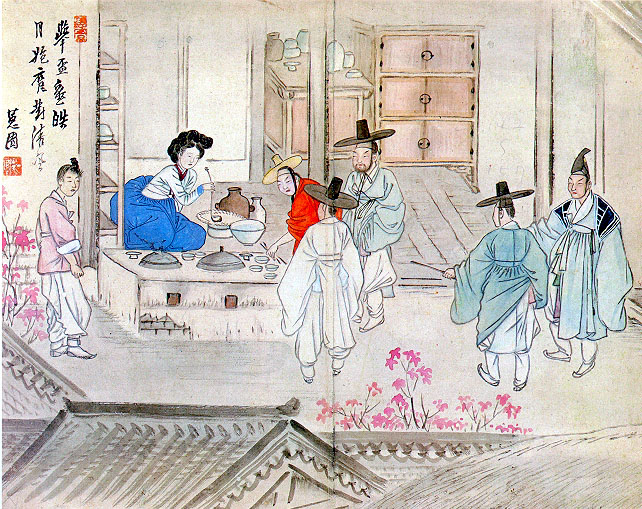
Holding a drinking party, from Hyewon pungsokdo

During the Late Joseon, the Confucian ideals of propriety and "filial piety" gradually came to be equated with a strict observance of a complex social hierarchy, with many fine gradations. By the early 18th century, the social critic Yi Chung-hwan (1690–1756) sarcastically complained that "[W]ith so many different ranks and grades separating people from one another, people tend not to have a very large circle of friends." But, even as Yi wrote, the informal social distinctions of the Early Joseon were being reinforced by legal discrimination, such as Sumptuary law regulation of the dress of different social groups, and laws restricting inheritance and property ownership by women. Precisely because of the tenets of the Confucian Classic of Filial Piety, the adult male practice of Joseon prescribed to keep both hair and beard, in contrast to the Japanese Tokugawa period.

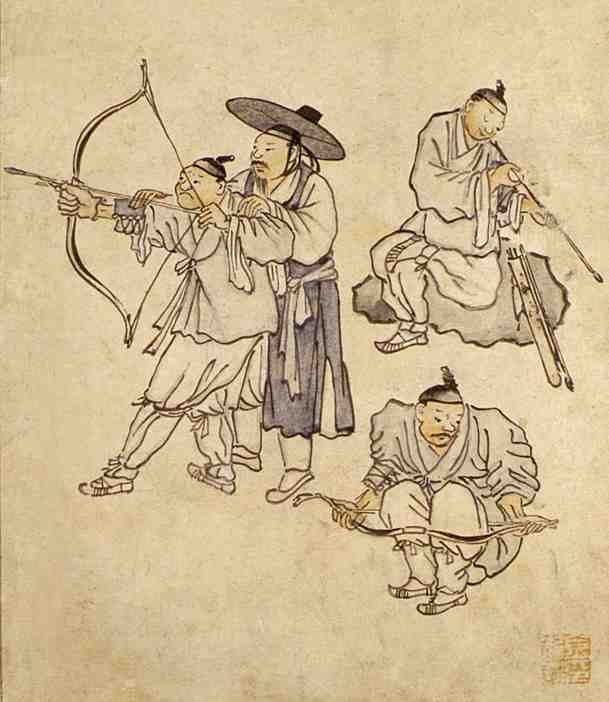
Shooting an arrow, from Danwon pungsokdo cheop

Yet, these laws may have been announced precisely because social mobility was increasing, particularly during the prosperous century beginning about 1710. The original social hierarchy of the Joseon era was developed based on the social hierarchy of the Goryeo era. In the 14th–16th centuries, this hierarchy was strict and stable. Since economic opportunities to change status were limited, no law was needed.

In the late 17th to 19th centuries, new commercial groups emerged, and the old class system was extremely weakened. The situation was most marked in the Daegu region's Yangban class, where they were expected to reach nearly 70% in 1858.

In 1801, government-owned slaves were all emancipated, and the institution gradually died out over the next century. By 1858, the nobi population stood at about 1.5 percent of the total population of Korea. The institution was completely abolished as part of a social plan in the Kabo Reform of 1894.

=== Seonbis ===
Seonbis played a major role within political factions of the Joseon dynasty. Etymologically derived from a native Korean word meaning "someone who is wise and knowledgeable", the word later became synonymous with the Chinese character 士 (shì), which meant "scholar" or "retainer". As the Joseon dynasty encouraged the study of Confucianism, seonbis were interpreted as "students who study Confucianism" in Joseon-era Korean society.

Seonbis lived under strict, standardized Confucianist guidelines. Although they were encouraged to participate in politics and act as advisors to the King, many seonbis lived quiet lives in secluded regions, unaffiliated with any government office. These seonbis often organized scholarly communities which often imposed a huge influence over local regions. Those who became office-holders acted as aristocrats, boasting influence over Joseon politics.

Seonbis consistently used debate as a major decision-making method. Seonbis expressed their views on problems to be solved in front of the king and discussed the wrongdoings of the other faction's argument. These political clashes often led to violence, such as the Korean literati purges.

Seonbis also participated in righteous armies during times of war, as archery was taught as a liberal arts subject for seonbis. Seonbis such as Kwak Chaeu, Ko Kyŏngmyŏng, and Cho Hŏn led armies in battle. As seonbis also acted as village leaders, they often united local peasants and led armies into war.

== Culture ==
The Joseon dynasty presided over two periods of great cultural growth, during which Joseon culture created the first Korean tea ceremony, Korean gardens, and extensive historic works. The royal dynasty also built several fortresses and palaces.

Noble Korean women during this time were suppressed, along with shamans, in the 15th century because of Neo-Confucianist social norms when they previously led some of the least restricted lives out of anyone in Asia.

=== Clothing ===
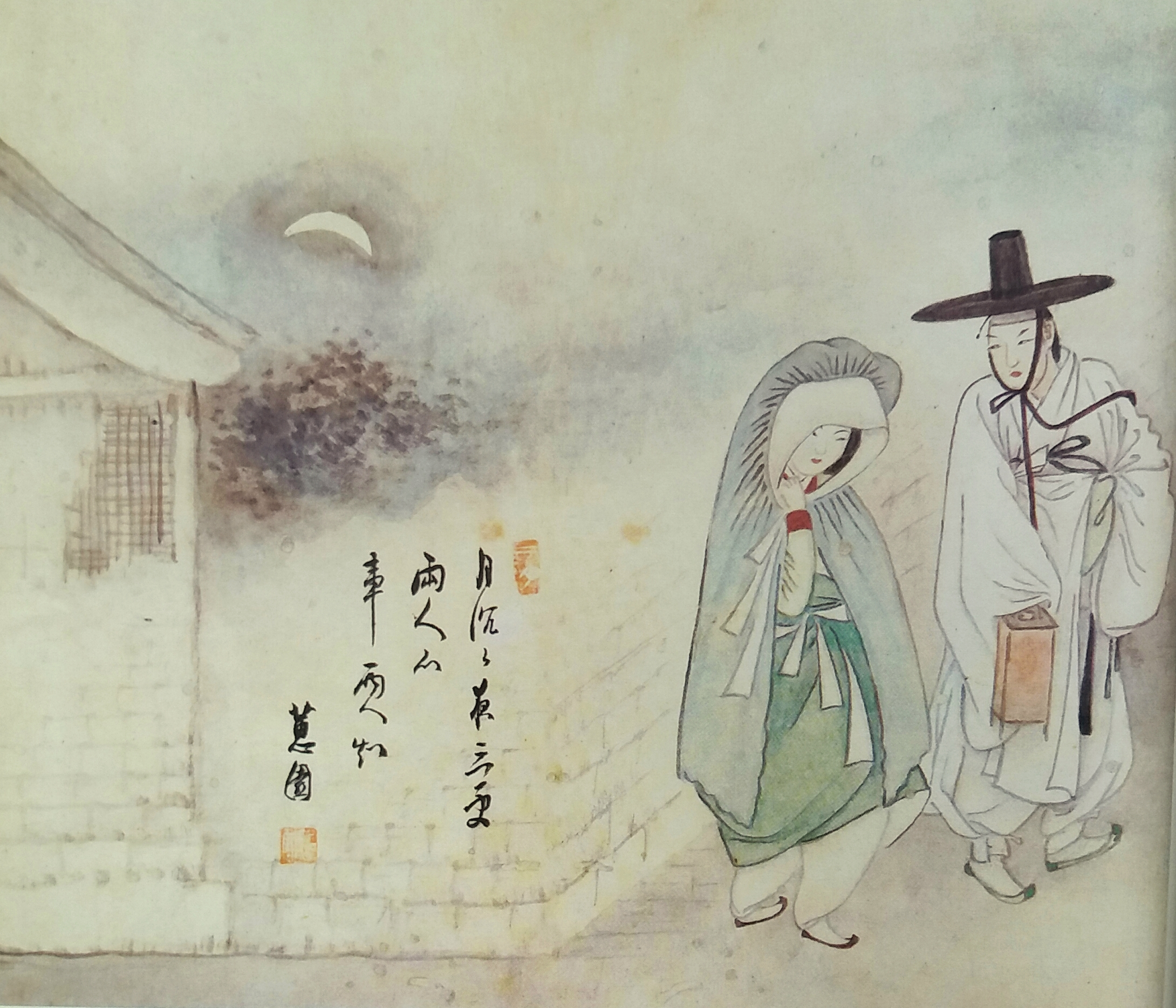
Men's (right) and women's (left) clothes (Hanbok) of Joseon period. A portrait painted by Shin Yun-bok (1758–1813).

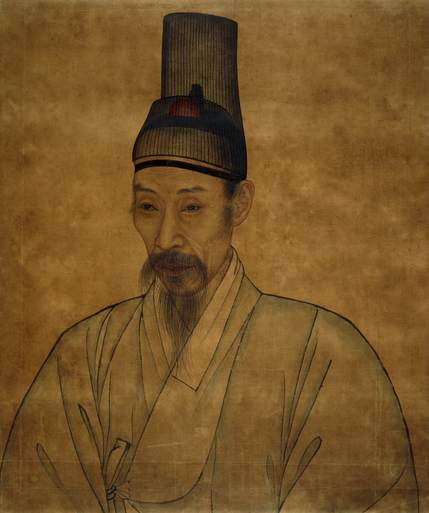
Male dress of a Seonbi. A portrait painted by Yi Jae-gwan (1783–1837).

During the Joseon period, jeogori of women's hanbok became gradually tightened and shortened. In the 16th century, jeogori was baggy and reached below the waist, but by the 19th century, jeogori was shortened to the point that it did not cover the breasts, so another piece of cloth (heoritti) was used to cover them. At the end of the 19th century, Heungseon Daewongun introduced Magoja, a Manchu-style jacket, to Korea, which is often worn with hanbok to this day.

Chima was full-skirted and jeogori was short and tight in the late Joseon period. Fullness in the skirt was emphasized round the hips. Many undergarments were worn underneath chima such as darisokgot, soksokgot, dansokgot, and gojengi to achieve a desired silhouette. Because jeogori was so short it became natural to expose heoritti or heorimari which functioned like a corset. The white linen cloth exposed under the jeogori in the picture is heoritti.

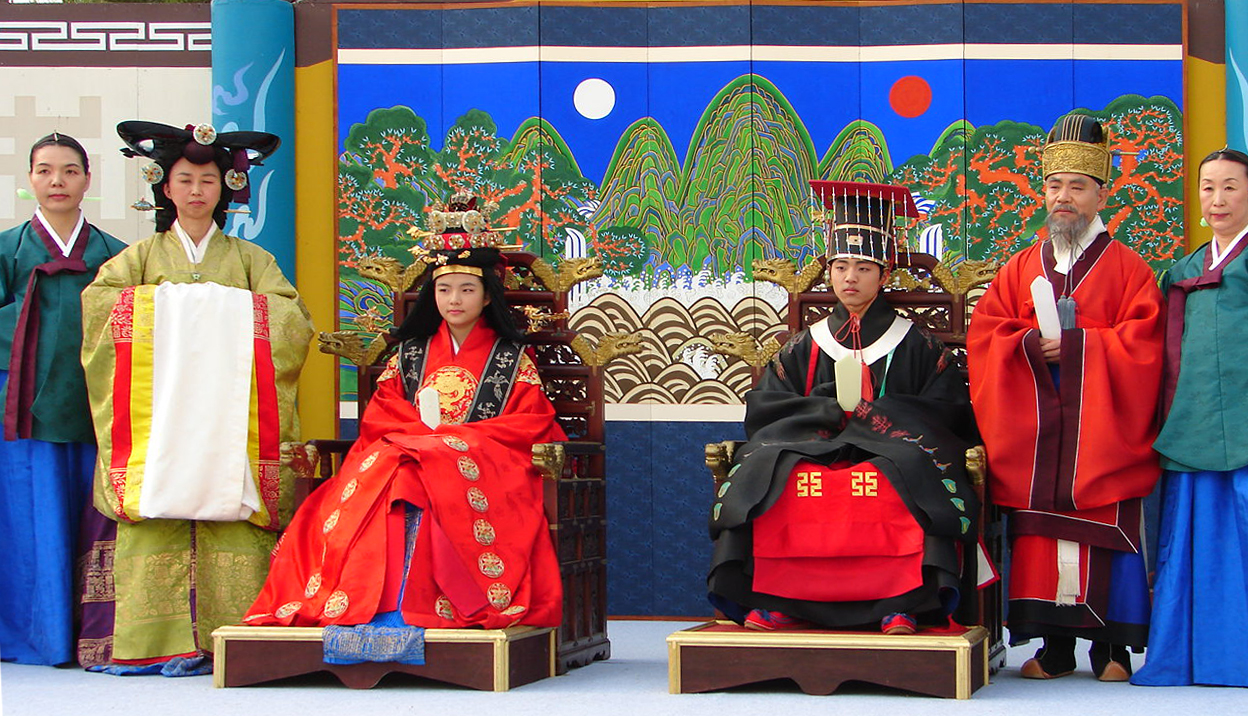
Royal ceremony with Joseon era clothing

The upper classes wore hanbok of closely woven ramie cloth or other high-grade lightweight materials in warm weather and of plain and patterned silks the rest of the year. Commoners were restricted by law as well as resources to cotton at best. The upper classes wore a variety of colors, though bright colors were generally worn by children and girls and subdued colors by middle-aged men and women. Commoners were restricted by law to everyday clothes of white, but for special occasions they wore dull shades of pale pink, light green, gray, and charcoal. Formally, when Korean men went outdoors, they were required to wear overcoats known as durumagi which reach the knees.

=== Art ===
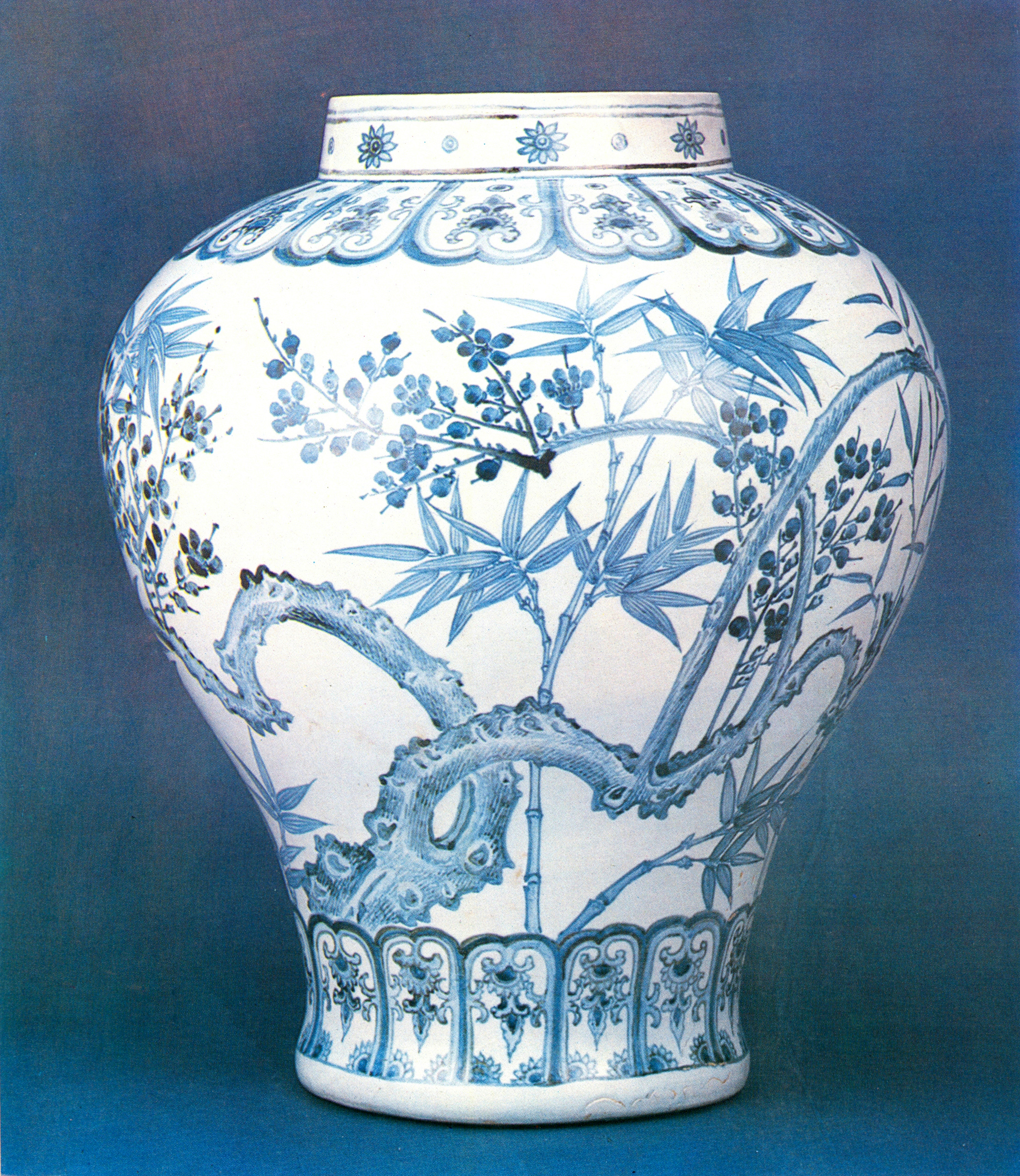
15th century. Joseon period, Korea. Blue and white porcelain jar with plum and bamboo design.

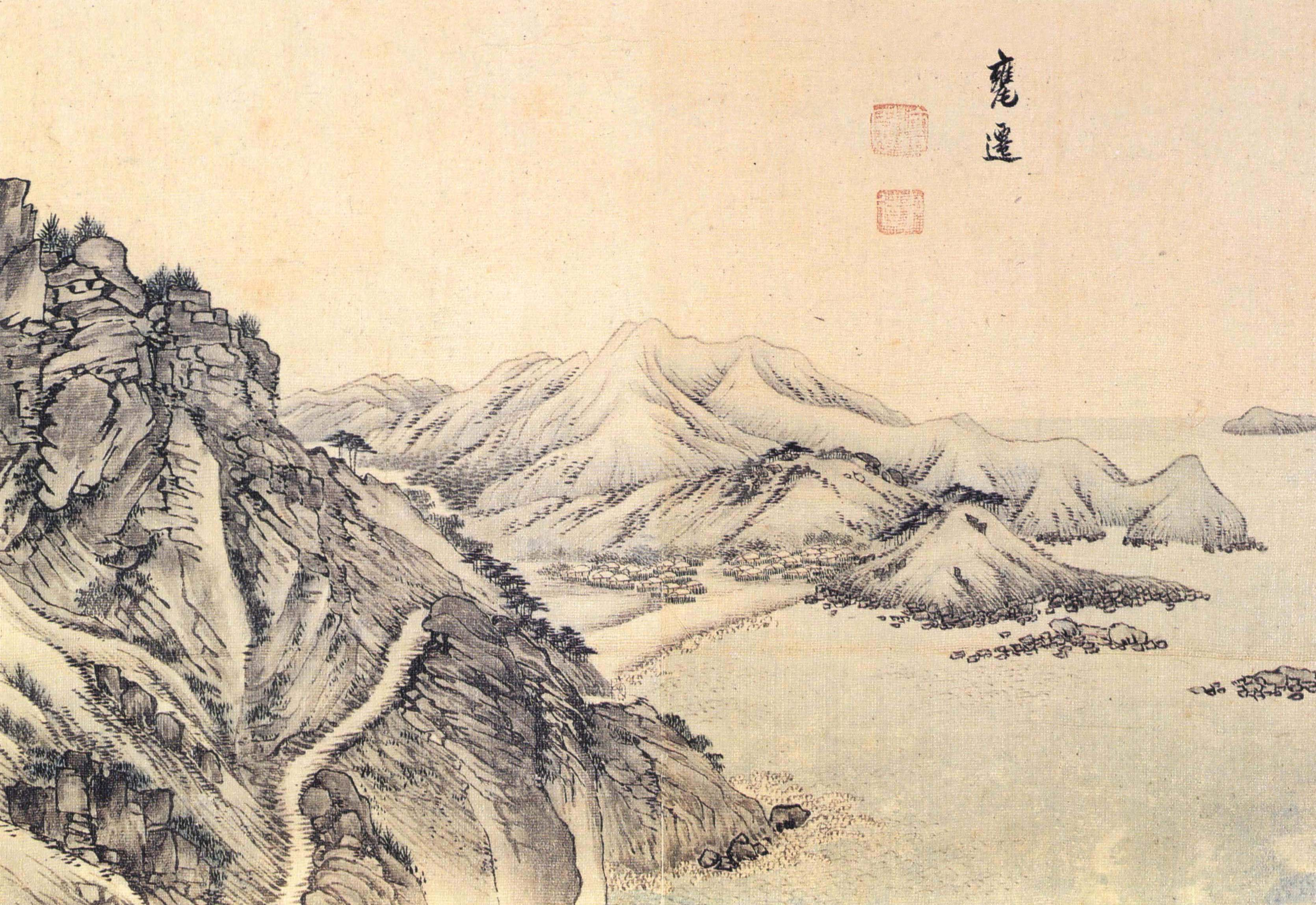
Landscape of Mt. Geumgang by Kim Hong-do (1745–1806) in 1788

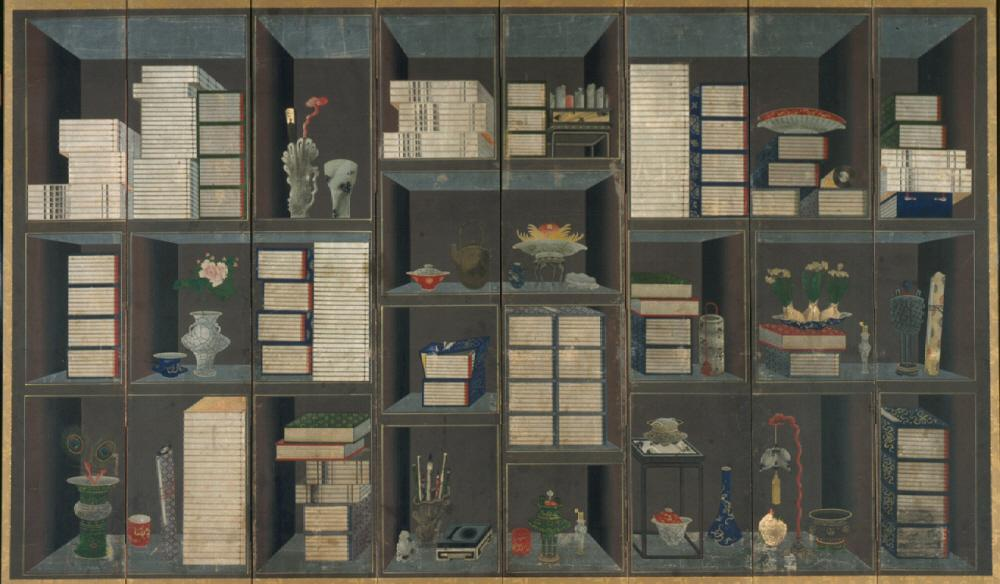
Chaekgeori a type of Minhwa

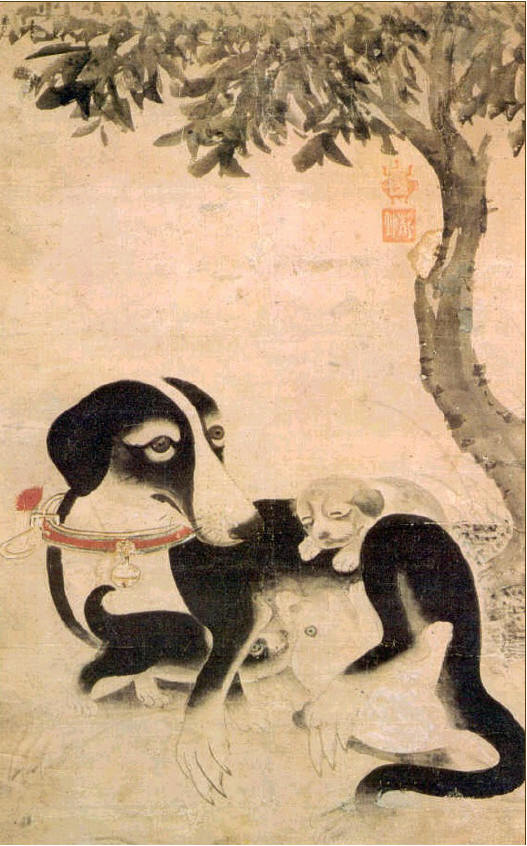
Mogyeon by Yi Am

The Mid-Joseon period painting styles moved toward increased realism. A national painting style of landscapes called "true view" began – moving from the traditional Chinese style of idealized general landscapes to particular locations exactly rendered. While not photographic, the style was academic enough to become established and supported as a standardized style in Korean painting. At this time China ceased to have pre-eminent influence, Korean art took its own course, and became increasingly distinctive to the traditional Chinese painting.

Ceramics are a form of popular art during the Joseon period. Examples of ceramics include white porcelain or white porcelain decorated with cobalt, copper red underglaze, blue underglaze and iron underglaze. Ceramics from the Joseon period differ from other periods because artists felt that each piece of art deserved its own uniquely cultivated personality.

Beginning in the 10th century, white porcelain has been crafted in Korea. Historically overshadowed by the popularity of celadon, it was not until the 15th and 16th centuries that white porcelain, also known as baekje, was recognized for its artistic value. Among the most prized of Korean ceramics are large white jars. Their shape is symbolic of the moon and their color is associated with the ideals of purity and modesty of Confucianism. During this period, the bureau that oversaw the meals and court banquets of the royal family strictly controlled the production of white porcelain.

Blue and white porcelain artifacts decorating white porcelain with paintings and designs in underglaze by using natural cobalt pigment are another example of popular wares of the Joseon period. Many of these items were created by court painters employed by the royal family. During this period, the popular style of landscape paintings is mirrored in the decoration of ceramics. Initially developed by the Chinese at the Jingdezhen kilns in the mid-14th century, Joseon began to produce this type of porcelain from the 15th century under Chinese influence. The first cobalt imported from China was used by Korean artists. In 1463 when sources of cobalt were discovered in Korea, artists and their buyers found the material was inferior in quality and preferred the more expensive imported cobalt. Korean porcelain with imported cobalt decoration contradict the emphasis of an orderly, frugal and moderate life in Neo-Confucianism.

Strikingly different from cobalt, porcelain items with a copper-red underglaze are the most difficult to successfully craft. During production, these items require great skill and attention or will turn gray during the process of firing. While the birthplace of ceramics with copper red underglaze is widely disputed, these items originated during 12th century in Korea and became increasingly popular during the second half of the Joseon period. Some experts have pointed to the kilns of Bunwon-ri in Gwangju, a city that played a significant role in the production of ceramics during the Joseon period, as a possible birthplace.

Porcelain was also decorated with iron. These items commonly consisted of jars or other utilitarian pieces.

=== Literature ===
During the Joseon period, the yangban scholars and educated literati studied Confucian classics and Neo-Confucian literature.

The middle and upper classes of Joseon society were proficient in Classical Chinese. The Joseon official records (such as the Veritable Records of the Joseon Dynasty and Seungjeongwon ilgi) and the written works of the Yangban literati were written in Classical Chinese.

Newspapers like the Hwangsŏng sinmun toward the end of the period were written in the Korean language using the Korean mixed script.

==== Annals of the Joseon Dynasty ====
The Veritable Records of the Joseon Dynasty (also known as the Annals of the Joseon Dynasty) are the annual records of the Joseon dynasty, which were kept from 1413 to 1865. The annals, or sillok, consist of 1,893 volumes and are thought to cover the longest continual period of a single dynasty in the world. With the exception of two sillok compiled during the colonial era, the Annals are the 151st national treasure of Korea and listed in UNESCO's Memory of the World registry.

==== Uigwe ====
Uigwe is a collection of royal protocols of the Joseon period, which records and prescribes through text and stylized illustration the important ceremonies and rites of the royal family.

=== Religion and philosophy ===
The Joseon kingdom was noted for having Confucianism as its main philosophy, and also included some Buddhism. The study of literary exchanges between Confucian scholar officials and Buddhists shows that Buddhism was not cast out. Their literary exchanges show a middle ground of both philosophies. "scholar-officials – Some who in public castigated Buddhism as a heresy and deluded tradition, in private visited temples and associated closely with monks." This shows that while in public some scholars shamed Buddhists, their exchanges with Buddhists show that at the very least it was not cast outside of the kingdom.

One example of this is a famous Joseon scholar official Park Se-dang (1629–1703). He argues against Buddhism with the following, "People say that Han Yu and Ouyang Xiu have harshly criticized Buddhism and therefore have only discussed what is aberrant and have not fully investigated what is profound. People say, their understanding is lacking and they have not fully examined it [its profoundness]. I, myself, don't think that is the case… The heresies under heaven, they are also rather foul. Among them, Buddhism is the worst. If a person is inclined to Buddhism, then he is of the kind that pursues what is foul. Is it not clear that there is nothing further to discuss? It is like Mencius who [also felt no need to argue in detail when he] criticized Yang Zhu and Mozi. Surely, he did not argue further than to say Yang Zhu and Mozi did not respect their fathers and their emperors."

Buddhism was a part of the Joseon kingdom. While not supported publicly, privately it was very prevalent in Confucian-scholar officials. Many monarchs and members of the royal court also practiced or tolerated Buddhism among their family and court advisors and commissioned or were patrons of Buddhist art.

Pope Gregory XVI established an Apostolic Vicariate for the Kingdom of Korea on September 8, 1831, to provide for the spiritual care of Catholics in the kingdom and separating Korea from the jurisdiction of the Bishop of Beijing.

=== Music ===
The Joseon period developed several musical forms. The form with the most extant pieces is sijo. Sijo is a poetic form consisting of three lines, each with four feet, traditionally sung very slowly. In Korean verse, a foot is generally a short syntactic unit, such as a noun with an adjective or a verb with an adverb.

Here, like other Korean musical forms, each foot can stand on its own. As sijo were sung in Korean, the pioneering of Hangul created the possibility for sijo to be written down without the use of substitutions such as Idu script. The first copy of sijo is of the 'Twelve Songs of Dosan' by Yi Hwang written in 1565, which were written 100 years after the proclamation of Hangul. Additionally, the first anthology of sijo was compiled by Kim Cheontaek in 1728; before the anthology few sijo were written.

Kim Cheontaek's anthology represents a change in the authorship of sijo. At first, sijo were primarily composed by the yangban aristocracy and entertainers of the Kisaeng class. By the mid-seventeenth century, the jungin or "professional class" were composing sijo as well. This also coincided with a new form of sijo called "narrative sijo", in which the first two lines were greatly lengthened. This expansion is likely a development from the so-called "irregular sijo", in which there was a minor lengthening of one of the first two lines. While there are very few remaining irregular sijo, and the form has not been revived, there is a sizable body of narrative sijo and the form continues to evolve.

Pansori is another musical form that combines singing and prose to portray a story. Its development likely originates from shaman rituals and the songs within the Jeolla Province. It became a full-fledged musical form by the middle of the eighteenth century, and not long thereafter the yangban aristocracy also became interested in it. Originally there was a set of twelve stories that were sung, but only five were written down, and hence those five are the only ones sung today. Having been developed by commoners, p'ansori usually reflected their attitudes and aspirations, but by becoming popular with the yangban, p'ansori shifted somewhat toward yangban sensibilities and restrictions. P'ansori had a strong influence of the writing of the time, both because of the p'ansori novel (each based on one of the twelve stories) and by increasing the realism of the classical novel.

== Science and technology ==
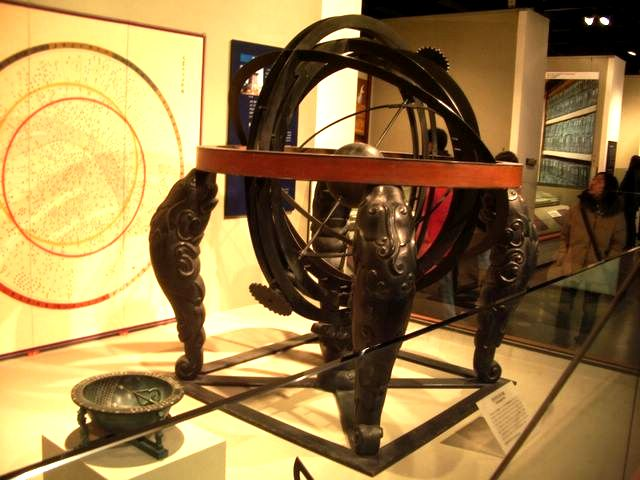
Korean celestial globe first made by the scientist Chang Yŏngsil during the reign of King Sejong

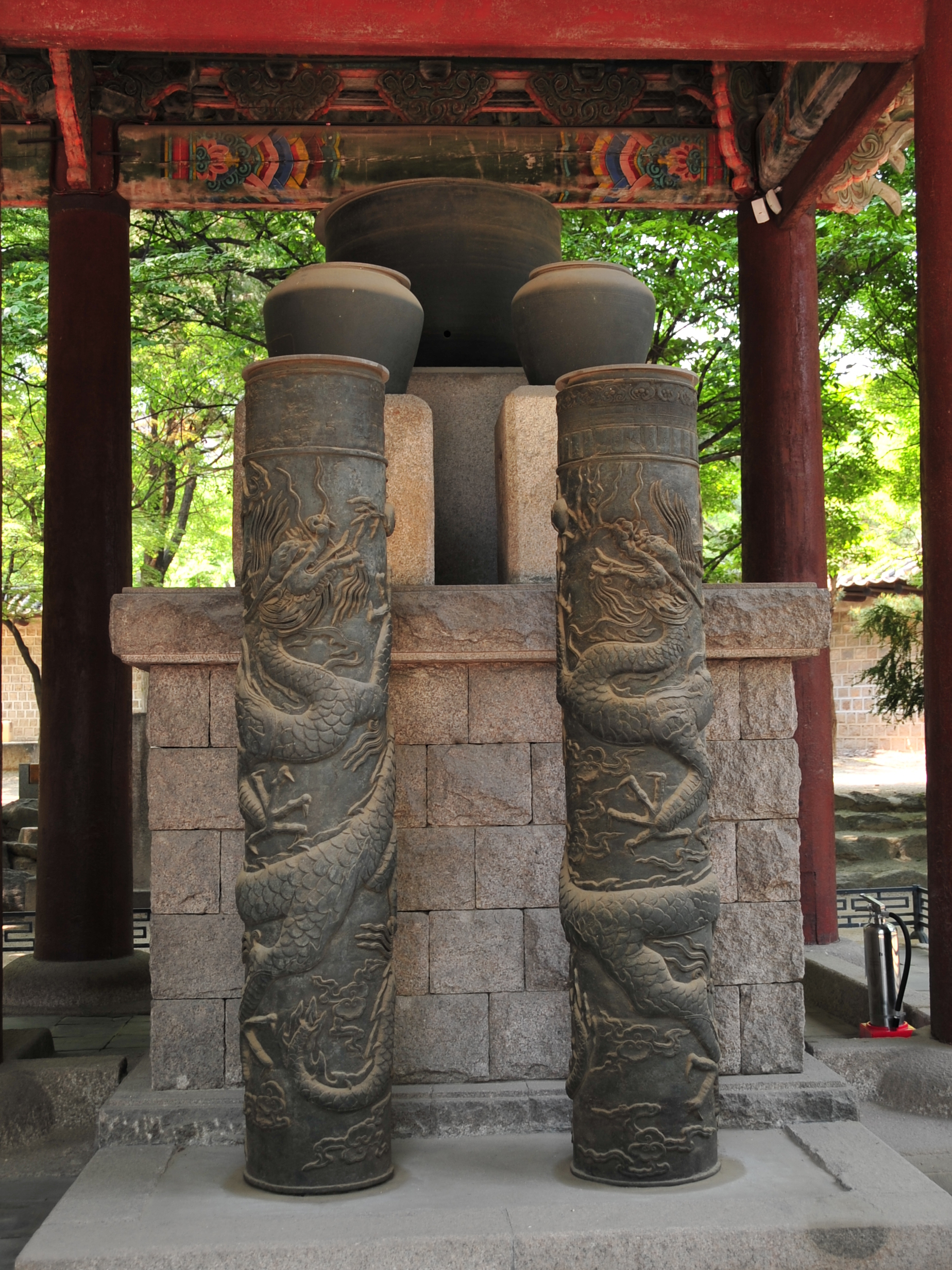
Surviving portion of the Water Clock (Jagyeongnu)

=== 15th century ===
The Joseon period under the reign of Sejong the Great was Korea's greatest period of scientific advancement. Under Sejong's new policy, Cheonmin (low-status) people such as Chang Yŏngsil were allowed to work for the government. At a young age, Chang displayed talent as an inventor and engineer, creating machines to facilitate agricultural work. These included supervising the building of aqueducts and canals.

Some of his inventions were an automated (self-striking) water clock (the Jagyeokru) which worked by activating motions of wooden figures to indicate time visually (invented in 1434 by Chang), a subsequent more complicated water-clock with additional astronomical devices, and an improved model of the previous metal movable printing type created in the Goryeo period. The new model was of even higher quality and was twice as fast. Other inventions were the sight glass, and the udometer.

The highpoint of Korean astronomy was during the Joseon period, where men such as Chang created devices such as celestial globes which indicated the positions of the sun, moon, and the stars. Later celestial globes (Kyup'yo) were attuned to the seasonal variations.

The apex of astronomical and calendarial advances under King Sejong was the Chiljeongsan, which compiled computations of the courses of the seven heavenly objects (five visible planets, the sun, and moon), developed in 1442. This work made it possible for scientists to calculate and accurately predict all the major heavenly phenomena, such as solar eclipses and other stellar movements. Honcheonsigye is an astronomical clock created by Song I-yeong in 1669. The clock has an armillary sphere with a diameter of 40 cm. The sphere is activated by a working clock mechanism, showing the position of celestial objects at any given time.

Gangnido, a Korean-made map of the world was created in 1402 by Kim Sa-hyeong, Yi Mu, and Yi Hoe. The map was created in the second year of the reign of Taejong of Joseon. The map was made by combining Chinese, Korean and Japanese maps.

=== 16th–19th century ===
The scientific and technological advance in the late Joseon period progressed slower than the early Joseon period.

16th-century court physician, Heo Jun wrote a number of medical texts, his most significant achievement being Dongui Bogam, which is often noted as the defining text of Traditional Korean medicine. The work spread to China and Japan.

The first soft ballistic vest, myeonjebaegab, was invented in Joseon Korea in the 1860s shortly after the French campaign against Korea. Heungseon Daewongun ordered development of bulletproof armor because of increasing threats from Western armies. Kim Gi-du and Gang Yun found that cotton could protect against bullets if thick enough, and devised bullet-proof vests made of 30 layers of cotton. The vests were used in battle during the United States expedition to Korea (1871), when the U.S. Navy attacked Ganghwa Island in 1871.

== House of Yi ==
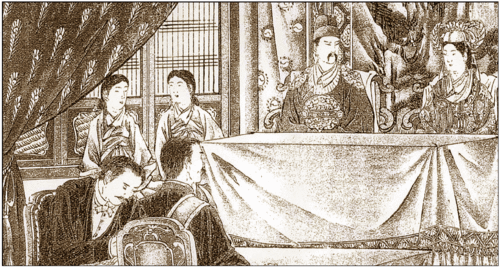
Japanese illustration of King Gojong and Queen Min receiving Inoue Kaoru

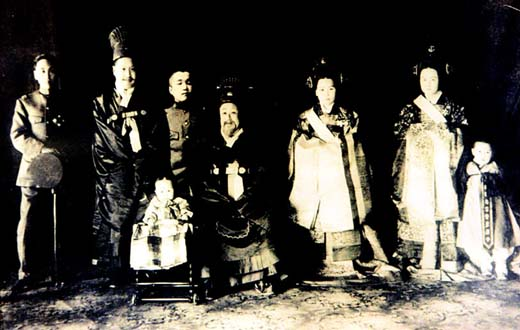
The royal family members in 1915, from left: Yi Kang, Prince Imperial Ui; Yi Cheok, Emperor Sunjong; Yi Un, Prince Imperial Yeong; Gojong; Empress Yun; Lady Kim, Consort Princess Imperial Ui; and Yi Geon. The child in the front row is Princess Deokhye. This is a compilation of individual photographs, since the Japanese did not allow them to be in the same room at the same time, and some were forced to leave Korea.

The following is a simplified relation of Joseon royalty (Korean Imperial Family) during the late period of the dynasty:

- Emperor Gojong (1852–1919) – 26th head of the Korean Imperial Household, adoptive heir to Crown Prince Hyomyeong
  - Emperor Sunjong (1874–1926) – 27th head of the Korean Imperial Household
  - Yi Kang, Prince Imperial Ui (1877–1955) – 5th son of Gojong
    - Prince Yi Geon (1909–1991) – eldest son of Yi Kang; renounced the Imperial title and heritage by becoming a Japanese citizen in 1947
    - Prince Yi U (1912–1945) – 2nd son of Yi Kang; adopted as the heir to Yi Jun-yong, grandson of Heungseon Daewongun
      - Yi Cheong (1936–)
      - Yi Jong (1940–1966)
    - Yi Hae-won (1919–2020) – 2nd daughter of Yi Kang; married in 1936 to Yi Seung-gyu from the Yongin Yi clan
    - Yi Gap (1938–2014) – 9th son of Yi Kang
      - Yi Won (1962–) – eldest son of Yi Gap; adopted by Yi Ku as the 30th head of the Korean Imperial Household
        - 1st son (1998–)
        - 2nd son (1999–)
    - Yi Seok (1941–) – 10th son of Yi Kang; self-claimed head of the Korean Imperial Household
      - Yi Hong (1976–), first daughter of Yi Seok
        - 1st daughter (2001–)
      - Yi Jin (1979–), 2nd daughter of Yi Seok
      - Yi Jeong-hun (1980–), son of Yi Seok
      - Andrew S. Lee (1983-), adopted son of Yi Seok (Yi declared him the Korean Crown Prince)
  - Yi Un, Imperial Crown Prince (1897–1970) – 28th head of the Korean Imperial Household; married in 1920 to Princess Masako of Nashimoto (Yi Bang-ja), an imperial member of the Empire of Japan.
    - Prince Yi Jin (1921–1922)
    - Prince Yi Ku (1931–2005) – 29th head of the Korean Imperial Household; son of Yi Un
  - Princess Deokhye (1912–1989) – married in 1931 to Count Sō Takeyuki
    - Countess Sō Masae (1932–?), disappeared since 1956, thought to have committed suicide

== See also ==
- History of Korea
- Veritable Records of the Joseon Dynasty
- List of kings of Joseon
- Kings family tree
- Politics of Joseon
- Korean Empire
- Joseon Army
  - Joseon Army (1881–1897)
- Joseon Navy

== Sources ==
- Duus, Peter (1998). The Abacus and the Sword: The Japanese Penetration of Korea. University of California Press. ISBN 978-0-520-92090-3.
- Ebrey, Patricia Buckley; Walthall, Ann; Palais, James B. (2006). East Asia: A Cultural, Social, and Political History. Boston and New York: Houghton Mifflin Press. ISBN 978-0-618-13384-0..
- Kennedy, George A. (1943). "Amin" . In Hummel, Arthur W. Sr. (ed.). Eminent Chinese of the Ch'ing Period. United States Government Printing Office. pp. 8–9.
- Kim Haboush, JaHyun (2005). "Contesting Chinese Time, Nationalizing Temporal Space: Temporal Inscription in Late Chosŏn Korea". In Lynn A. Struve (ed.). Time, Temporality, and Imperial Transition. Honolulu: University of Hawai'i Press. pp. 115–141. ISBN 978-0-8248-2827-1..
- Kim, Jinwung (2012). A History of Korea: From "Land of the Morning Calm" to States in Conflict. New York: Indiana University Press. ISBN 978-0-253-00024-8.
- Larsen, Kirk W. (2008). Tradition, Treaties, and Trade: Qing Imperialism and Chosŏn Korea, 1850–1910. Cambridge, Mass.: Harvard University Asia Center. ISBN 978-0-674-02807-4..
- Walker, Hugh D. (1971). "The Weight of Tradition: Preliminary Observations on Korea's Intellectual Response". In Jo, Yung-hwan (ed.). Korea's Response to the West. The Korea Research and Publications, Inc. pp. 1–14. Archived from the original on May 8, 2024.
- Lee, Peter H.; de Bary, William Theodore (1997). Sources of Korean Tradition, Volume I: From Early Times Through the Sixteenth Century. New York: Columbia University Press. ISBN 978-0-231-10567-5..
- Lee, Ji-Young (2017), China's Hegemony: Four Hundred Years of East Asian Domination, Columbia University Press
- Lin, Ming-te (December 8, 2014). "Li Hung-chang's Suzerain Policy toward Korea, 1882–1894". Chinese Studies in History. 24 (4): 69–96. doi:10.2753/CSH0009-4633240469..
