= SG Wannabe discography =

- Studio albums: 9
- Extended plays: 2
- Soundtrack albums: 11
- Compilation albums: 5
- Music videos: 43
- Video albums: 8

The discography of South Korean vocal group SG Wannabe consists of nine studio albums, five compilation albums, eight video albums, two extended plays, and numerous singles and soundtrack appearances.

SG Wannabe debuted in 2004 with the album SG Wanna Be+, which peaked at #4 on the monthly Recording Industry Association of Korea album sales chart and sold over 200,000 copies. The group's second album, Saldaga, reached #1 on the chart and was the best-selling album of 2005 in South Korea, selling over 400,000 copies, despite a slump in the domestic music market.

The group's third album, The 3rd Masterpiece (2006), and fourth album, The Sentimental Chord (2007), were also #1 albums, with the later becoming the best-selling album of 2007 in South Korea, selling over 190,000 copies.

== Albums ==
=== Studio albums ===
List of studio albums, with selected chart positions and sales
| Title | Album details | Peak chart positions | | | Sales |
| Title | Album details | KOR RIAK (Note: The Recording Industry Association of Korea album chart ceased publication in 2008.) | KOR Gaon (Note: The Gaon Music Chart was first published in 2010.) | JPN | Sales |
|---|---|---|---|---|---|
| SG Wanna Be+ | Released: January 20, 2004 (KOR); Label: Mnet Media; Formats: CD, cassette tape | 4 | — | — | KOR: 206,918 |
| Saldaga | Released: March 3, 2005 (KOR); Label: Mnet Media; Formats: CD, cassette tape | 1 | — | — | KOR: 434,734 |
| The 3rd Masterpiece | Released: April 4, 2006 (KOR); Label: Mnet Media; Formats: CD, cassette tape, digital download | 1 | — | — | KOR: 316,927 |
| The Sentimental Chord | Released: April 6, 2007 (KOR); Label: Mnet Media; Formats: CD, cassette tape, digital download | 1 | — | — | KOR: 195,502 |
| My Friend | Released: April 24, 2008 (KOR); Label: Mnet Media; Formats: CD, cassette tape | 3 | 45 | — | KOR: 108,973 |
| Rainbow | Released: March 11, 2009 (JPN); Label: Pony Canyon; Formats: CD, digital download | —N/a | — | 42 | |
| Gift From SG Wannabe | Released: April 23, 2009 (KOR); Label: Mnet Media; Formats: CD, digital download | —N/a | 60 | — | |
| SG Wannabe by SG Wannabe 7 Part.I | Released: October 19, 2010 (KOR); Label: IS Entermedia Group, Mnet Media; Formats: CD, digital download | —N/a | 4 | — | KOR: 23,199 |
| SG Wannabe by SG Wannabe 7 Part.II | Released: March 14, 2011 (KOR); Label: IS Entermedia Group, CJ E&M; Formats: CD, digital download | —N/a | 2 | — | KOR: 11,948 |
"—" denotes releases that did not chart.

=== Compilation albums ===
List of compilation albums, with selected chart positions and sales
| Title | Album details | Peak chart positions | | | Sales |
| Title | Album details | KOR RIAK | KOR Gaon | JPN | Sales |
|---|---|---|---|---|---|
| Classic Odyssey | Released: September 16, 2005 (KOR); Label: Mnet Media; Formats: CD, cassette tape | 3 | — | — | KOR: 177,752 |
| The Precious History | Released: November 18, 2006 (KOR); Label: Mnet Media; Formats: CD, cassette tape | 2 | 57 | — | KOR: 151,568 |
| Story In New York | Released: November 26, 2007 (KOR); Label: Mnet Media; Formats: CD, cassette tape | 3 | — | — | KOR: 69,492 |
| I Love SG Wanna Be+ | Released: March 19, 2008 (JPN); Label: Pony Canyon; Formats: CD | — | — | 38 | |
| The Essential SG Wannabe | Released: September 21, 2012 (KOR); Label: Mnet Media; Formats: CD, digital download | —N/a | 11 | — | KOR: 9,245 |
"—" denotes releases that did not chart.

=== Reissues ===
List of reissued albums, with selected chart positions and sales
| Title | Album details | Peak chart positions | Sales |
| Title | Album details | KOR RIAK | Sales |
|---|---|---|---|
| SG Wanna Be+ (Music 2.0 Special Edition) Vol. 1 | Released: August 23, 2007 (KOR); Label: Mnet Media; Formats: CD | 8 | KOR: 13,631 |
| SG Wanna Be+ (Music 2.0 Special Edition) Vol. 2 | Released: August 28, 2008 (KOR); Label: Mnet Media; Formats: CD | —N/a | |

=== Video albums ===
List of video albums, with selected chart positions
| Title | Album details | Peak chart positions |
| Title | Album details | JPN |
|---|---|---|
| Junai Monogatari (純愛物語) | Released: April 27, 2005 (JPN); Label: Geneon Entertainment; Formats: DVD | — |
| SG Wannabe 2006 Live Concert DVD | Released: October 3, 2006 (KOR); Label: Mnet Media; Formats: DVD | — |
| Dong Gam 4 Vol.1 Travel (同感4 Vol.1 Travel) | Released: December 15, 2006 (JPN); Label: E-Net Frontier; Formats: DVD | — |
| SG Wannabe Official Box 1st+ | Released: March 3, 2007 (JPN); Label: Geneon Universal Entertainment; Formats: DVD | — |
| SG Wannabe Tokyo Tour 2007 Live DVD | Released: October 26, 2007 (JPN); Label: Amuse Soft Entertainment; Formats: DVD | 235 |
| SG Wannabe New Year Concert 2008 My Way | Released: July 16, 2008 (JPN); Label: Pony Canyon; Formats: DVD | 167 |
| My Friend Forever | Released: January 28, 2009 (JPN); Label: Jackal; Formats: DVD | 203 |
| The Gift from SG Wannabe 2009 Live Concert DVD | Released: July 5, 2010 (KOR); Label: Mnet Media; Formats: DVD | — |
"—" denotes releases that did not chart.

== Extended plays ==
List of extended plays, with selected chart positions and sales
| Title | Album details | Peak chart positions | Sales |
| Title | Album details | KOR Gaon | Sales |
|---|---|---|---|
| The Voice | Released: August 19, 2015 (KOR); Label: CJ E&M; Formats: CD, digital download | 5 | KOR: 10,463 |
| Our Days | Released: November 18, 2016 (KOR); Label: CJ E&M; Formats: CD, digital download | 17 | KOR: 3,553 |

== Single albums ==
| Title | Album details |
|---|---|
| 만나자 | Released: September 6, 2018 (KOR); Label: Stone Music Entertainment; Formats: digital download; Track listing: 1. 너와 내 이름 (Your Name, My Name); 2. 만나자 (Let's Meet Up Now); 3. 우리의 노래 (Our Song) |

== Singles ==
List of singles, with selected chart positions and sales
| Title | Year | Peak chart positions | | Sales | Album |
| Title | Year | KOR | JPN | Sales | Album |
Korean
| "Timeless" | 2004 | 4 | — | | SG Wanna Be+ |
| "I Loved You to Death" (죽을 만큼 사랑했어요) | 2004 | — | — | | SG Wanna Be+ |
| "Sin and Punishment" (죄(罪)와벌(罰)) | 2005 | 37 | — | | Saldaga |
| "Saldaga" (살다가) | 2005 | 16 | — | KOR: 62,500 | Saldaga |
| "My Heart's Treasure" (내 마음의 보석상자) | 2005 | — | — | | Classic Odyssey |
| "Untouchable" (with M2M, Kim Jong-kook) | 2005 | — | — | | The 3rd Masterpiece |
| "Gone with the Wind" (바람과 함께 사라지다) (with Kim Jong-kook) | 2005 | — | — | | The 3rd Masterpiece |
| "Partner for Life" (내사람) | 2006 | 15 (Note: The version of "Partner for Life" released in the compilation album The Precious History charted at #15. The original release from "The 3rd Masterpiece" charted at #93.) | — | | The 3rd Masterpiece |
| "Only Wind, Only Wind" (바람만바람만) (with Kim Jong-kook) | 2006 | 141 | — | | Non-album singles |
| "Must Have Love" (with Brown Eyed Girls) | 2006 | 45 | — | KOR: 87,000 | Non-album singles |
| "Arirang" (아리랑) | 2007 | 52 | — | | The Sentimental Chord |
| "Grace" (은(恩)) | 2007 | — | — | | The Sentimental Chord |
| "First Snow" (첫눈) | 2007 | — | — | | Story in New York |
| "Like the First Time" (처음처럼) | 2008 | — | — | | Non-album single |
| "I Miss You" (보고싶어) | 2008 | — | — | | My Friend |
| "Lalala" | 2008 | 7 | — | | My Friend |
| "Smooth Break Up" (멋지게 이별) | 2008 | — | — | | My Friend |
| "I Love You" (사랑해) (feat. Park Seung-hwa of Yurisangja) | 2009 | — | — | | Gift from SG Wannabe |
| "Cry Baby" (내사랑 울보) | 2009 | 152 | — | | Gift from SG Wannabe |
| "I Love You" (사랑합니다) (with V.O.S) | 2009 | 16 | — | | Non-album single |
| "Winter Tree" (겨울 나무) | 2010 | 22 | — | | SG Wannabe by SG Wannabe 7 Part.I |
| "Sunflower" (해바라기) | 2010 | 9 | — | KOR: 1,269,000 | SG Wannabe by SG Wannabe 7 Part.I |
| "Running" (달리기) (with Uhm Ji-won) | 2010 | 70 | — | | Non-album single |
| "Just" (고작) | 2011 | 13 | — | KOR: 380,000 | SG Wannabe by SG Wannabe 7 Part.II |
| "Love Rule" (사랑법) | 2011 | 7 | — | KOR: 1,114,000 | Non-album single |
| "Love You" (가슴 뛰도록) | 2015 | 2 | — | KOR: 754,000 | The Voice |
| "Good Memory" (좋은 기억) | 2015 | 6 | — | KOR: 367,000 | The Voice |
| "I'm Missing You" (아임미싱유) | 2016 | 30 | — | KOR: 80,000 | Our Days |
| "Let's Meet Up Now" (만나자) | 2018 | — | — | | Let's Meet Up Now (single album) |
| "You're the Best of Me" (넌 좋은 사람) | 2021 | 21 | — | | Non-album single |
Japanese
| "Get Along Together" | 2008 | — | 17 | | Rainbow |
| "In the Rain" | 2008 | — | 23 | | Rainbow |
| "Precious～君だけが僕の帰る場所" | 2010 | — | 27 | | Non-album single |
"—" denotes releases that did not chart.

== Soundtrack appearances ==
| Title | Year | Peak chart positions | Sales | Album |
| Title | Year | KOR | Sales | Album |
|---|---|---|---|---|
| "The Story" | 2004 | — | | Magic OST |
| "Even If You Meet Someone Else" (다른 사랑 만나도) | 2005 | — | | Sad Love Story OST |
| "Against Fate" (With Kim Jong-wook) | 2008 | — | | East of Eden OST |
| "Page One" (페이지원) (with Ock Joo-hyun) | 2010 | 25 | KOR: 361,277 | Coffee House OST |
| "I Love You" (그대를 사랑합니다) | 2011 | 31 | | Flames of Desire OST |
| "A Man Like You" (너란 사람) | 2011 | 26 | KOR: 324,966 | Thorn Birds OST |
| "By My Side" (사랑하자) | 2016 | 8 | KOR: 864,429 | Descendants of the Sun OST |
| "Confess" (고백합니다) | 2016 | 34 | KOR: 49,174 | Moon Lovers: Scarlet Heart Ryeo OST |
| "Writing Our Stories" (우리의 얘기를 쓰겠소) | 2017 | — | | Chicago Typewriter OST |
"—" denotes releases that did not chart.

== Videography ==
=== Music videos ===
| Title | Year |
|---|---|
| "Timeless" | 2004 |
| "I Loved You to Death" | 2004 |
| "Don't Know Why" | 2004 |
| "Saldaga" | 2005 |
| "Sin and Punishment" | 2005 |
| "Craze" | 2005 |
| "My Heart's Treasure Chest" | 2005 |
| "Dreamy Conversation" (Acoustic Version) | 2005 |
| "Nae saram: Partner for Life" | 2006 |
| "Slowpoke" | 2006 |
| "Untouchable" | 2006 |
| "Gone with the Wind" | 2006 |
| "Even If I Could See You" | 2006 |
| "Ordinary People" | 2006 |
| "Song of Love" | 2006 |
| "Arirang" | 2007 |
| "One Summer Day's Dream" | 2007 |
| "Stay" | 2007 |
| "First Snow" | 2007 |
| "A Christmas Story" | 2007 |
| "Lalala" | 2008 |
| "Smooth Break-Up" | 2008 |
| "I Miss You" | 2008 |
| "I Love You" | 2009 |
| "Cry Baby" | 2009 |
| "Sunflower" | 2010 |
| "Just" | 2011 |
| "Love You" | 2016 |
| "Good Memory" | 2016 |
