= Han Eun-jung =

South Korean actress (born 1980)

Han Da-gam
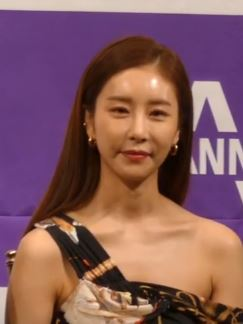
- Han in 2020
- Born: Han Eun-jung; July 10, 1980 (age 46); Daejeon, South Korea
- Education: Kyung Hee Cyber University - Information and Communication
- Occupation: Actress
- Years active: 1999–present
- Spouse: Unknown (m. 2020)

Korean name
- Hangul: 한다감
- RR: Han Dagam
- MR: Han Tagam

Former name
- Hangul: 한은정
- Hanja: 韓恩廷
- RR: Han Eunjeong
- MR: Han Ŭnjŏng

Han Da-gam (Korean: 한다감; born July 10, 1980), formerly known as Han Eun-jung (한은정), is a South Korean actress. She is known for Successful Story of a Bright Girl (2002), Full House (2004) and Two Guys (2004).

== Personal life ==
In 2020, Han married a businessman after a year of dating. On April 28, 2026, she announced her first pregnancy.

She announced the birth of her son on September 28,2026.

== Filmography ==
=== Television series ===
Year	Title	Role	Ref.
1999	For the Sake of Love		
2000	Popcorn		
2002	Successful Story of a Bright Girl	Yoon Na-hee	
2002	Orange	Han Eun-jung	
2002	Age of Innocence	Min-kyung	
2002	Like a Flowing River	Kim Kyung-joo	
2003	Scent of a Man	Shin Eun-hye	
2004	Full House	Kang Hye-won	
2005	Wonderful Life	Lee Chae-young	
2006	Seoul 1945	Kim Hye-kyung / Kehee	
2007	The Person I Love	Kim Seo-young	
2008	The Lawyers of the Great Republic Korea	Lee Ae-ri	
2009	Cinderella Man	Jang Se-eun	
2010	Grudge: The Revolt of Gumiho	Gu San-daek / Gumiho	
2011	400-year-old Dream	Kang Hee-sun / Soo-hee	
2014	Golden Cross	Hong Sa-ra	
2014	Blade Man	Kim Tae-hee	
2018	Return	Yeom Mi-jung	
2018	Let Me Introduce Her	Jung Soo-jin	
2020	Touch	Baek Ji-yoon	
2020	Graceful Friends	Baek Hae-sook	
2021–2022	The All-Round Wife	Seo So-hee	
2023	Celebrity	Wang Ro-La	
2023	Durian's Affair	Lee Eun-seong	

=== Film ===
Year	Title	Role
2004	Two Guys	Ji-seon
2004	Don't Tell Papa	girl in couple
2008	The Divine Weapon	Hong-ri
2011	Ghastly	Sunny
2015	Love at The End of the World	Mom

=== Music video appearances ===
Year	Song title	Artist
2005	"As We Live"	SG Wannabe
2005	"Sin and Punishment"	SG Wannabe
2005	"Craze"	SG Wannabe
2008	"Bad Guy"	Kim Jong-wook

=== Variety show ===
Year	Title	Role
2001	Preview Touch Comedy File	
2010	Olive News	Host
2010	Road for Hope	
2011	Secret Europe	
2013	Law of the Jungle in Savanna	Cast member (Episode 81–89)
2013	Saturday Night Live Korea	Host (season 4, episode 35)
2013	Sweet Makeover	Host
2017	Living Together in Empty Room	Cast member (episodes 1–11)
2018	Law of the Jungle in Mexico	Cast member for first half (Episode 314–320)
2018	Real Life Men and Women	Cast member
2022	Certificate of Family Relations	Host

=== Web shows ===
Year	Title	Role	Ref.
2021	Golf Eve	Main Cast	

== Awards and nominations ==
Year	Award	Category	Nominated work	Result
1997	Gorilla Jeans Contest	—N/a	—N/a	Won
1999	Miss World Queen University	—N/a	—N/a	Won
2002	SBS Drama Awards	New Star Award	Successful Story of a Bright Girl, Age of Innocence	Won
2006	7th Korea Visual Arts Awards	Photogenic Award, Acting category	Seoul 1945	Won
2006	KBS Drama Awards	Excellence Award, Actress	Seoul 1945	Won
2008	29th Blue Dragon Film Awards	Best New Actress	The Divine Weapon	Nominated
2009	32nd Golden Cinematography Awards	Best Actress	The Divine Weapon	Won
2010	KBS Drama Awards	Top Excellence Award, Actress	Grudge: The Revolt of Gumiho	Nominated
2010	KBS Drama Awards	Excellence Award, Actress in a Miniseries	Grudge: The Revolt of Gumiho	Won
2010	KBS Drama Awards	Netizen Award, Actress	Grudge: The Revolt of Gumiho	Nominated
2011	33rd Golden Cinematography Awards	Most Popular Actress	Ghastly	Won
2011	KBS Drama Awards	Best Actress in a One-Act Drama/Special	400-year-old Dream	Won
2014	KBS Drama Awards	Best Supporting Actress	Golden Cross, Blade Man	Won
2017	MBC Entertainment Awards	Popularity Award	Living Together in Empty Room	Won
2018	SBS Drama Awards	Excellence Award, Actress in a Daily and Weekend Drama	Let Me Introduce Her	Nominated
2021	KBS Drama Awards	Excellence Award, Actress in a Daily Drama	The All-Round Wife	Won
2022	8th APAN Star Awards	Excellence Award, Actress in a Serial Drama	The All-Round Wife	Nominated
