= 23rd Golden Disc Awards =

2008 South Korean music awards ceremony

- Official poster for the 23rd Golden Disc Awards
- Date: December 10, 2008
- Location: Olympic Hall, Olympic Park, Seoul, South Korea
- Hosted by: Shin Dong-yup; Park Ji-yoon
- Website: http://isplus.joinsmsn.com/goldendisk

Television/radio coverage
- Network: Mnet; KMTV

The 23rd Golden Disc Awards were held on December 10, 2008. They recognized accomplishments by musicians from the previous year.

== Presenters ==
- Kim So-yeon
- Lee So-yeon
- So Yi-hyun
- Song Dae-kwan
- Jeong Si-ah
- Jin Bo-ra
- Kim Seong-eun
- Moon Chae-won
- Park Ye-jin
- Go Ara
- Seo Woo

== Winners and nominees ==
=== Main awards ===
Winners and nominees are listed in alphabetical order. Winners are listed first and emphasized in bold.

Digital Daesang (Song of the Year)	Disc Daesang (Album of the Year)
**Jewelry – "One More Time"**; Brown Eyed Girls – "L.O.V.E"; MC Mong – "Circus"; Wonder Girls – "Nobody"	**TVXQ – Mirotic**; Brown Eyes – Two Things Needed for the Same Purpose and 5 Objects; Kim Dong-ryul – Monologue; Rain – Rainism; SG Wannabe – My Friend; Shinhwa – Volume 9
Digital Song Bonsang	Album Bonsang
**Brown Eyed Girls – "L.O.V.E"**; **Jewelry – "One More Time"**; **MC Mong – "Circus"**; **Wonder Girls – "Nobody"**; Big Bang – "Haru Haru"; Big Bang – "Last Farewell"; Brown Eyed Girls – "How Come"; Crown J – "Too Much" (feat. Seo In-young); Davichi – "Love and War"; Davichi – "Sad Promise"; Epik High – "One" (feat. Jisun); Epik High – "Umbrella" (feat. Younha); Gummy – "I'm Sorry" (feat. T.O.P); Haha – "You Are My Destiny"; Kim Dong-ryul – "Like a Child"; Kim Jong-kook – "Today More Than Yesterday"; Lee Hyori – "U-Go-Girl" (feat. Nassun); MC Mong – "Love You Even When I Die" (feat. Lena Park); Mighty Mouth – "I Love You" (feat. Yoon Eun-hye); Nell – "Time Walking on Memories"; Park Ji-heon (V.O.S) – "Bogosipeun Naren.."; Rain – "Love Story"; Seo Taiji – "Bermuda [Triangle]"; SG Wannabe – "Lalala"; SG Wannabe & Kim Jong-wook – "Against Fate"; Taeyang – "Only Look at Me"; Taeyeon – "Can You Hear Me"; TVXQ – "Mirotic"; Wheesung – "Fading Star"; Wonder Girls – "So Hot"	**Brown Eyes – Two Things Needed for the Same Purpose and 5 Objects**; **Kim Dong-ryul – Monologue**; **Rain – Rainism**; **SG Wannabe – My Friend**; **Shinhwa – Volume 9**; **TVXQ – Mirotic**; Alex – My Vintage Romance; Big Bang – Remember; Dynamic Duo – Last Days; Epik High – Pieces, Part One; F.T. Island – Colorful Sensibility; Gummy – Comfort; Jaurim – Ruby Sapphire Diamond; Jewelry – Kitchi Island; KCM – Kingdom; Kim Gun-mo – Soul Groove; Kim Jong-kook – Here I Am; Lee Hyori – It's Hyorish; MC Mong – Show's Just Begun; MC the Max – Via 6; Nell – Separation Anxiety; Park Jin-young – Back to Stage; SeeYa – Brilliant Change; Shinee – The Shinee World; Shin Hye-sung – Live and Let Live; Son Ho-young – Returns; Sung Si-kyung – Here, In My Heart; Toy – Thank You; V.O.S – Wonderful Things; Younha – Someday
Best Trot Award	Best Rock Award
**Jang Yoon-jeong – "Jang Yoon-jeong Twist"**; Park Hyun-bin – "Shabang Shabang"; Wink – "Cheonsaengyeonbun"	**Nell – "Time Walking On Memories"**; Jaurim – "Carnival Amour"; Maya – "Even That Common Ring"; Onnine Ibalgwan – "Beautiful Thing"; Trans Fixion – "Radio"
Rookie of the Year (Digital Category)	Rookie of the Year (Album Category)
**Davichi – "Love and War"**; 2PM – "10 Out of 10"; Joo – ""Because of a Man"; Mighty Mouth – "I Love You" (feat. Yoon Eun-hye); Shinee – "Replay"	**Shinee – The Shinee World**; Davichi – Amaranth; Ibadi – Story of Us; Mighty Mouth – Energy; Zia – Road Movie
Popularity Award
**F.T. Island**; **Son Ho-young**; **Taeyeon**; **TVXQ**; Alex; Big Bang; Brown Eyed Girls; Brown Eyes; Crown J; Davichi; Dynamic Duo; Epik High; Gummy; Haha; Jaurim; Jewelry; KCM; Kim Dong-ryul; Kim Gun-mo; Kim Jong-kook; Kim Jong-wook; Lee Hyori; MC Mong; MC the Max; Mighty Mouth; Nell; Park Ji-heon (V.O.S); Park Jin-young; Rain; SeeYa; Seo Taiji; SG Wannabe; Shin Hye-sung; Shinee; Shinhwa; Son Dam-bi; Sung Si-kyung; Taeyang; Toy; V.O.S; Wheesung; Wonder Girls; Younha

=== Other awards ===
- New Trend Award: Kim Jong-wook
- Lifetime Achievement Award: Kim Chang-wan
- Record Producer of the Year: Lee Soo-man

== Gallery ==
Award ceremony gallery

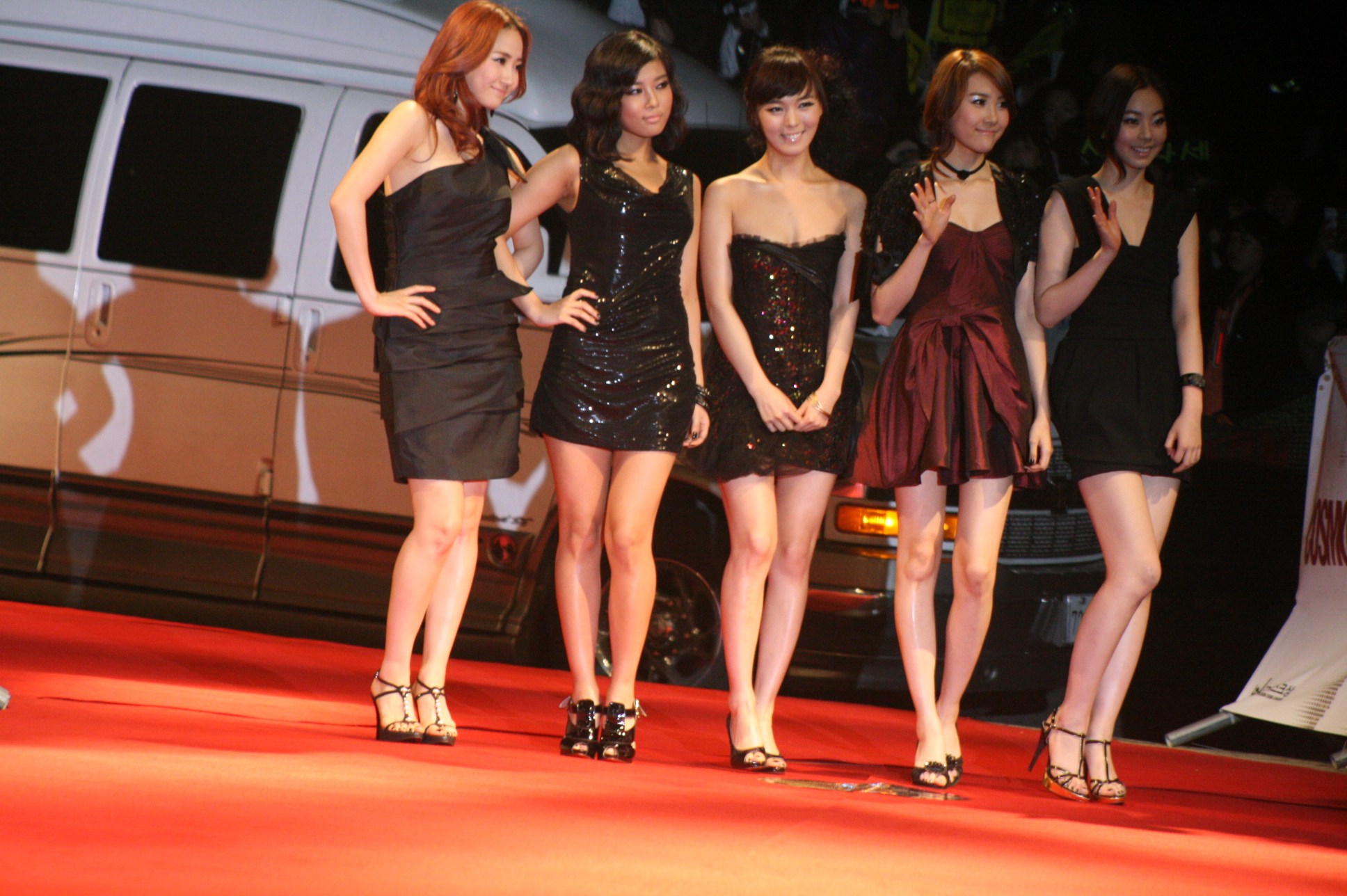
Wonder Girls, Digital Bonsang

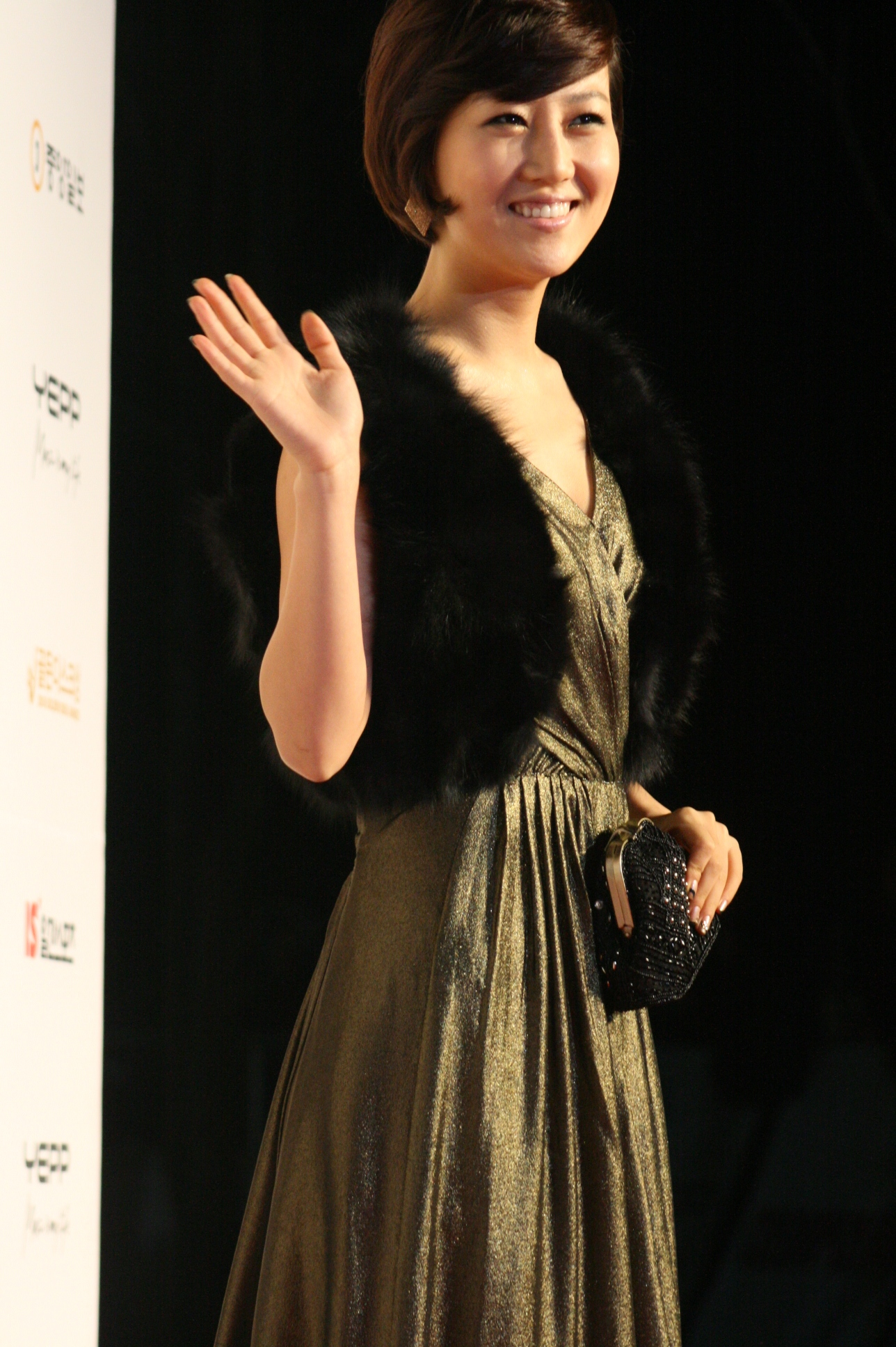
Jang Yoon-jeong, Best Trot

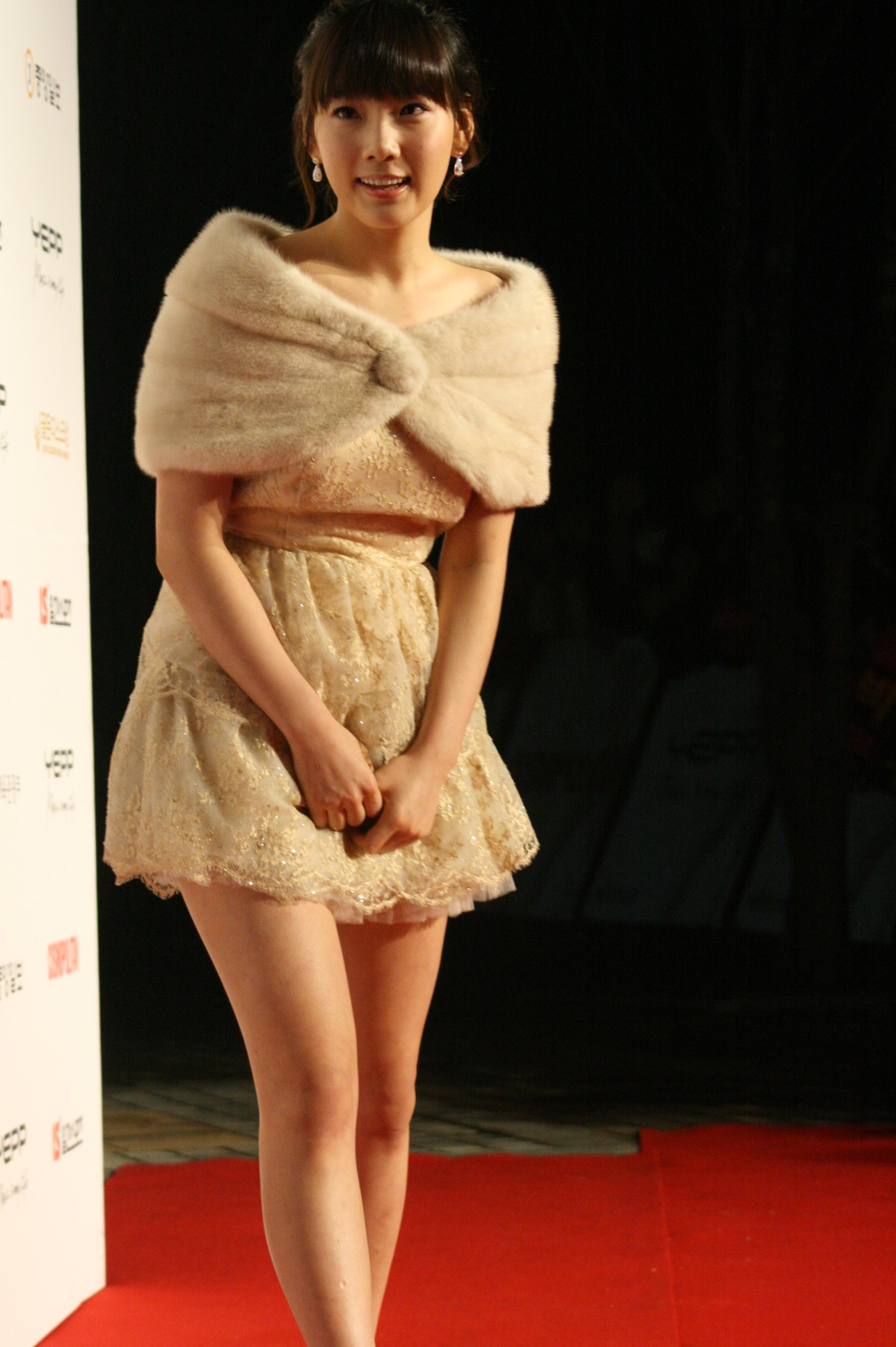
Girls' Generation's Taeyeon

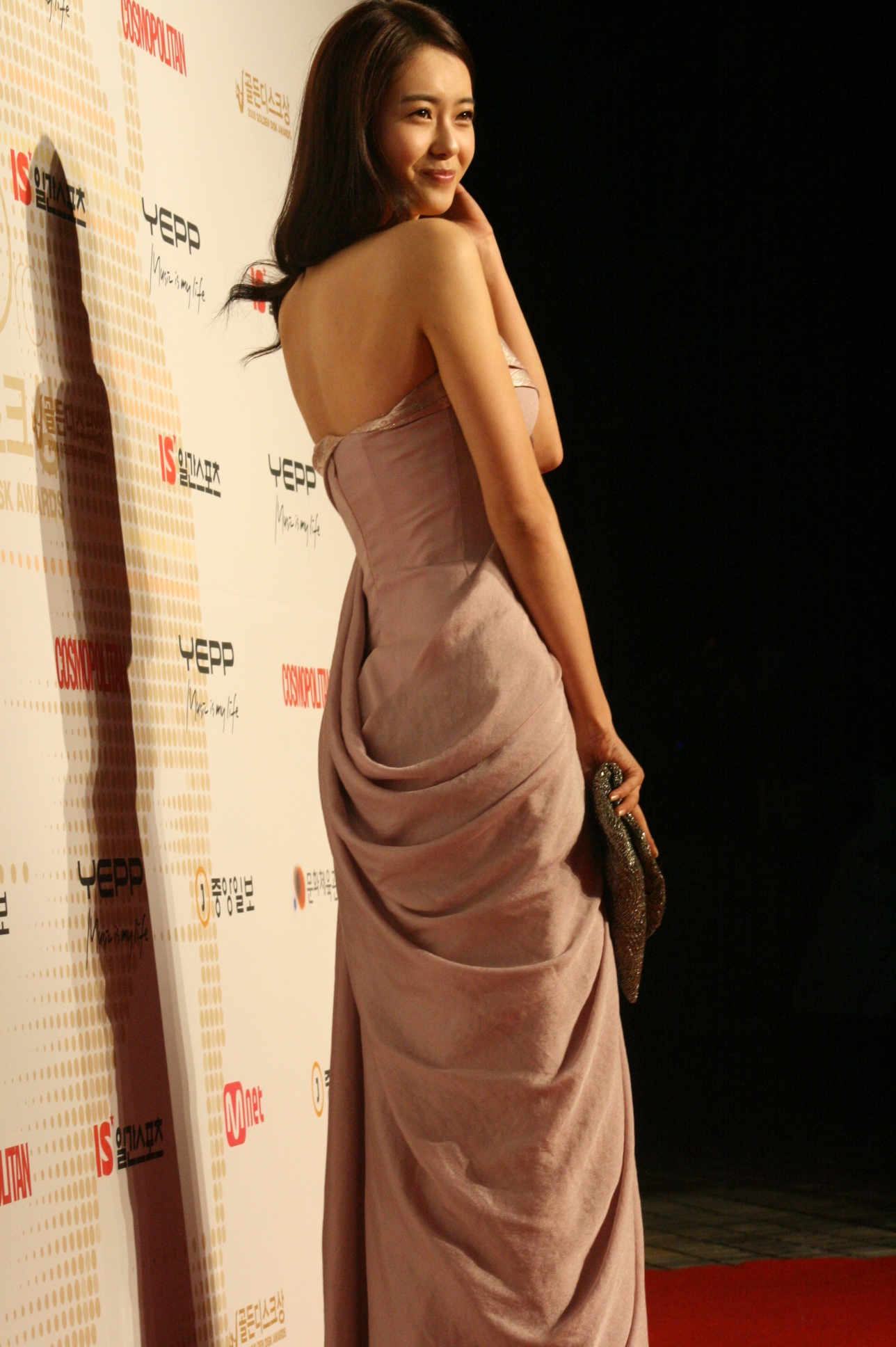
Go Ara

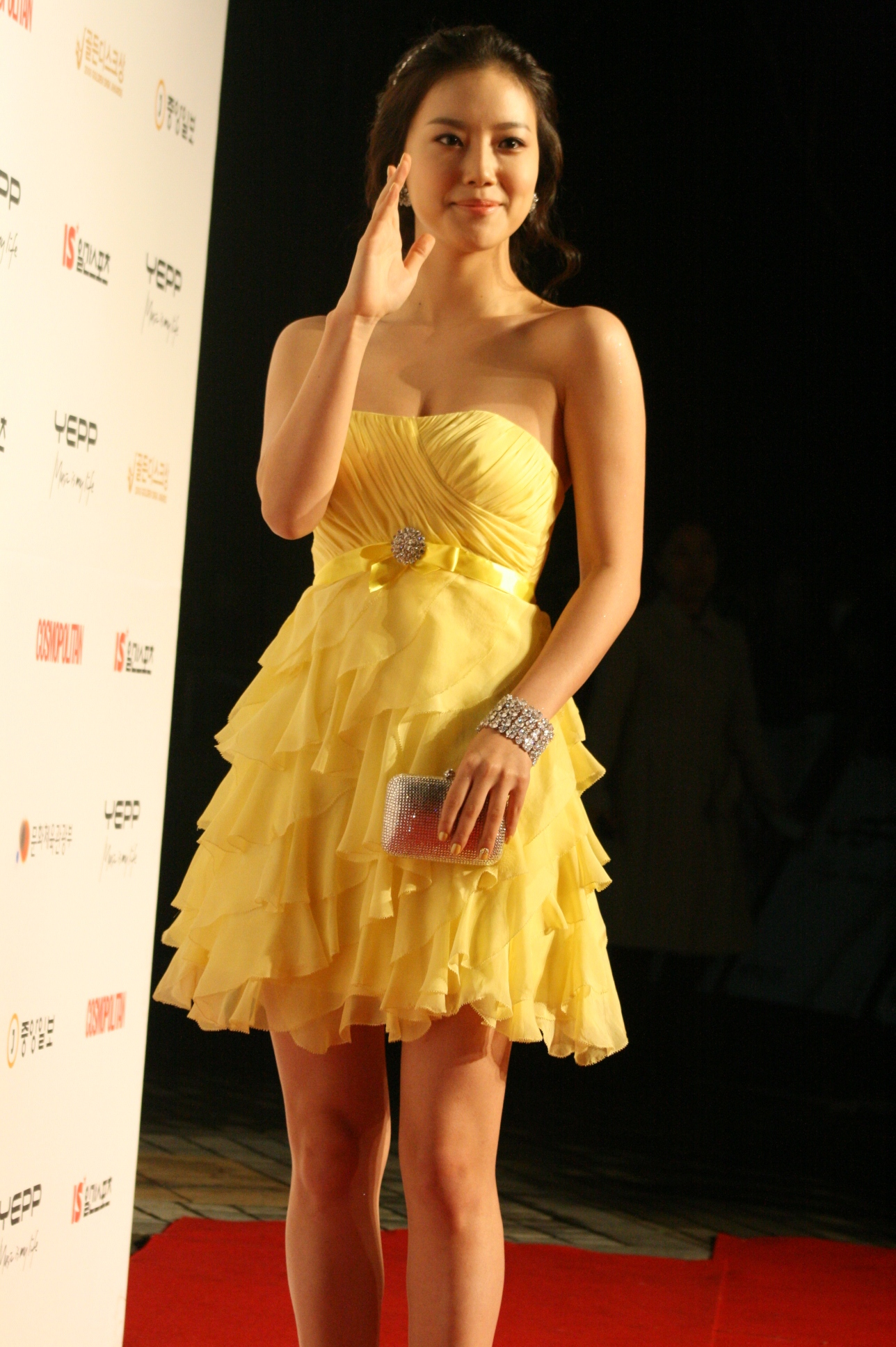
Moon Chae-won

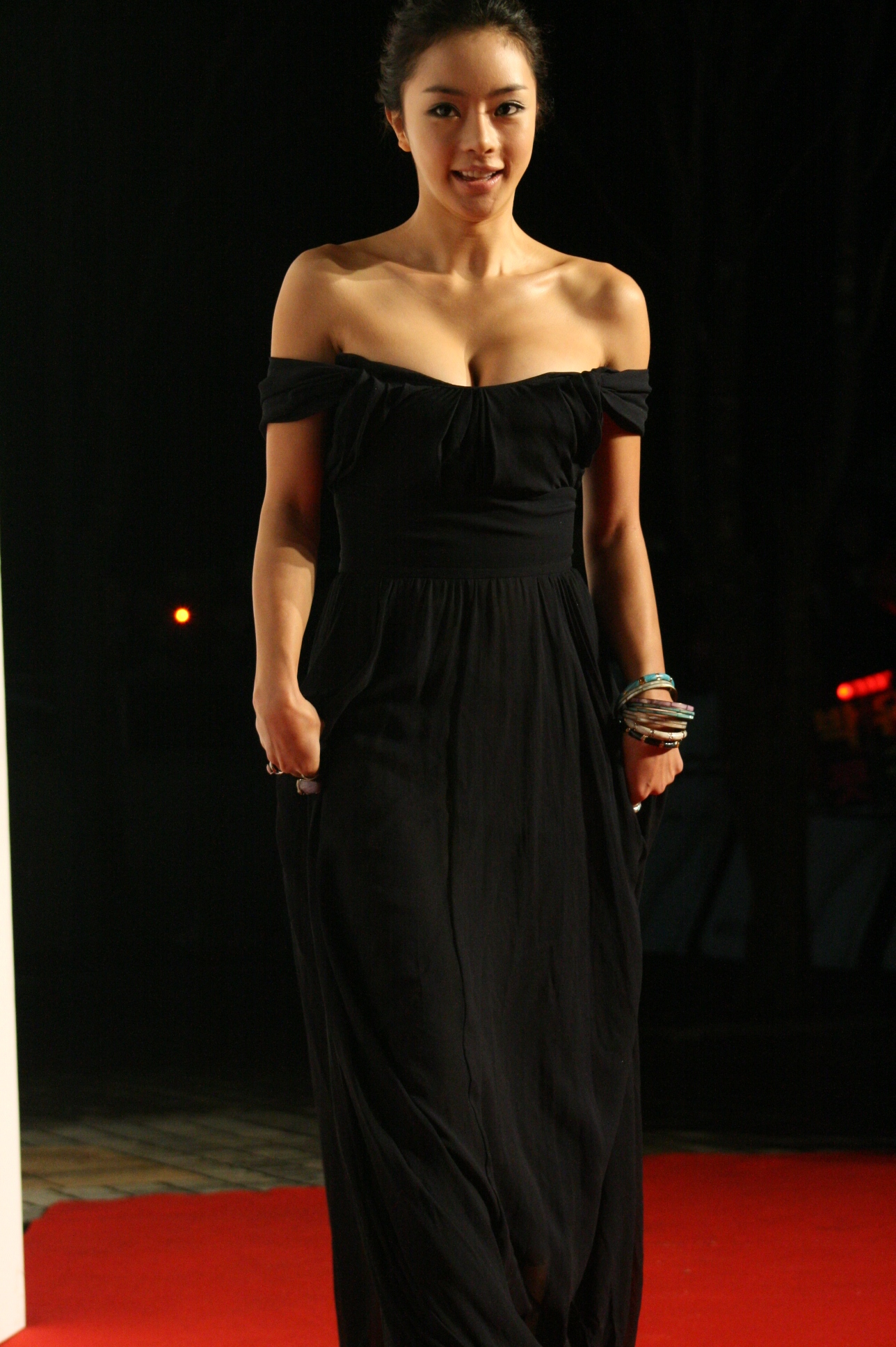
Seo Woo
