= 24th Golden Disc Awards =

2009 South Korean music awards ceremony

- Official poster for the 24th Golden Disc Awards
- Date: December 10, 2009
- Location: Olympic Hall, Olympic Park, Seoul, South Korea
- Hosted by: Kim Seong-joo; Park Ji-yoon

Television/radio coverage
- Network: www.qtv.co.kr

The 24th Golden Disc Awards were held December 10, 2009. They recognized accomplishments by musicians from the previous year.

== Presenters ==
- Jung Yong-hwa
- Kim So-eun
- Oh Ji-eun
- Lee Chung-ah
- Jeong Ga-eun
- Jeon Hye-bin
- Go Eun-ah
- Ha Seok-jin
- Lee Si-young
- Lee Wan
- Seo Hyo-rim
- Yoon Eun-hye
- Lee Yeon-hee

== Winners and nominees ==
=== Main awards ===
Winners and nominees are listed in alphabetical order. Winners are listed first and emphasized in bold.

Digital Daesang (Song of the Year)	Disc Daesang (Album of the Year)
**Girls' Generation – "Gee"**; Baek Ji-young – "Like Being Shot By a Bullet"; Davichi – "8282"; Lee Seung-gi – "Will You Marry Me" (feat. Bizniz); Son Dam-bi – "On A Saturday Night"	**Super Junior – Sorry, Sorry**; 2PM – 01:59PM; Drunken Tiger – Feel gHood Muzik: The 8th Wonder; Lee Seung-chul – Mutopia; SG Wannabe – Gift from SG Wannabe
Digital Song Bonsang	Album Bonsang
**Baek Ji-young – "Like Being Shot By a Bullet"**; **Davichi – "8282"**; **Girls' Generation – "Gee"**; **Lee Seung-gi – "Will You Marry Me" (feat. Bizniz)**; **Son Dam-bi – "On A Saturday Night"**; 2NE1 – "Fire"; 2NE1 – "I Don't Care"; 2PM – "Again & Again"; 4Minute – "Hot Issue"; 8Eight – "Without a Heart"; Brown Eyed Girls – "Abracadabra"; Girls' Generation – "Genie"; Hwayobi – "Half"; K.Will – "Dropping The Tears"; Lee Seung-chul – "There is No One Like You"; Outsider – "Loner"; Seungri – "Strong Baby"; SG Wannabe – "I Love You" (feat. Park Seung-hwa); Shinee – "Ring Ding Dong"; SS501 – "Because I'm Stupid"; SS501 – "Love Like This"; Super Junior – "Sorry, Sorry"	**2PM – 01:59PM**; **Drunken Tiger – Feel gHood Muzik: The 8th Wonder**; **Lee Seung-chul – Mutopia**; **SG Wannabe – Gift from SG Wannabe**; **Super Junior – Sorry, Sorry**; Baek Ji-young – Sensibility; Bobby Kim – Love Chapter 1; Brown Eyed Girls – Sound-G; Dynamic Duo – Band of Dynamic Brothers; Epik High – [e]; F.T. Island – Cross & Change; Fly to the Sky – Decennium; G-Dragon – Heartbreaker; Im Chang-jung – Return to My World; Ivy – I Be..; Jo Sung-mo – Second Half; Kara – Revolution; Kiha & The Faces – Living the Carefree Life; Lee Seung-gi – Shadow; Lee So-ra – 7th Album; Lee Soo-young – Dazzle; Lee Sun-hee – Dear Love...; Leessang – Hexagonal; MC Mong – Humanimal; Outsider – Maestro; Park Hyo-shin – Gift Part 1; Seo Taiji – Atomos; Shin Hye-sung – Keep Leaves; Wheesung – Vocolate; Younha – Part A: Peace Love & Ice Cream
Best Hip-Hop Award	Best Rock Award
**Epik High – "Trot"/"Wannabe"**; Drunken Tiger – "Feel Good Music"; Leessang – "The Woman Who Can't Break Up, The Man Who Can't Leave"; MC Mong – "Indian Boy"; Outsider – "Loner"	**Kiha & The Faces – "Cheap Coffee"**; Boohwal – "Saenggagina"; Cherry Filter – "Pianissimo"; Yoon Do-hyun Band – "Still You"
Rookie of the Year	Popularity Award
**4Minute – "Hot Issue"**; **T-ara – "Lie"**; 2NE1 – "I Don't Care"; f(x) – "La Cha Ta"	**Shinee**; **Super Junior**; 4Minute; 8Eight; Baek Ji-young; Bobby Kim; Brown Eyed Girls; Davichi; Drunken Tiger; Dynamic Duo; Epik High; G-Dragon; F.T. Island; Fly to the Sky; Hwayobi; Im Chang-jung; Ivy; Jo Sung-mo; K.Will; Kara; Kiha & The Faces; Lee Seung-gi; Lee So-ra; Lee Soo-young; Lee Sun-hee; Leessang; MC Mong; Outsider; Park Hyo-shin; Seo Taiji; Seungri; SG Wannabe; Shin Hye-sung; Son Dam-bi; Wheesung; Younha

=== Other awards ===
- Record Producer of the Year: Lee Ho-yeon (president of DSP Media)
- Lifetime Achievement Award: Song Chang-sik (singer-songwriter)
