= Lee Seok-hoon (singer) =

South Korean singer

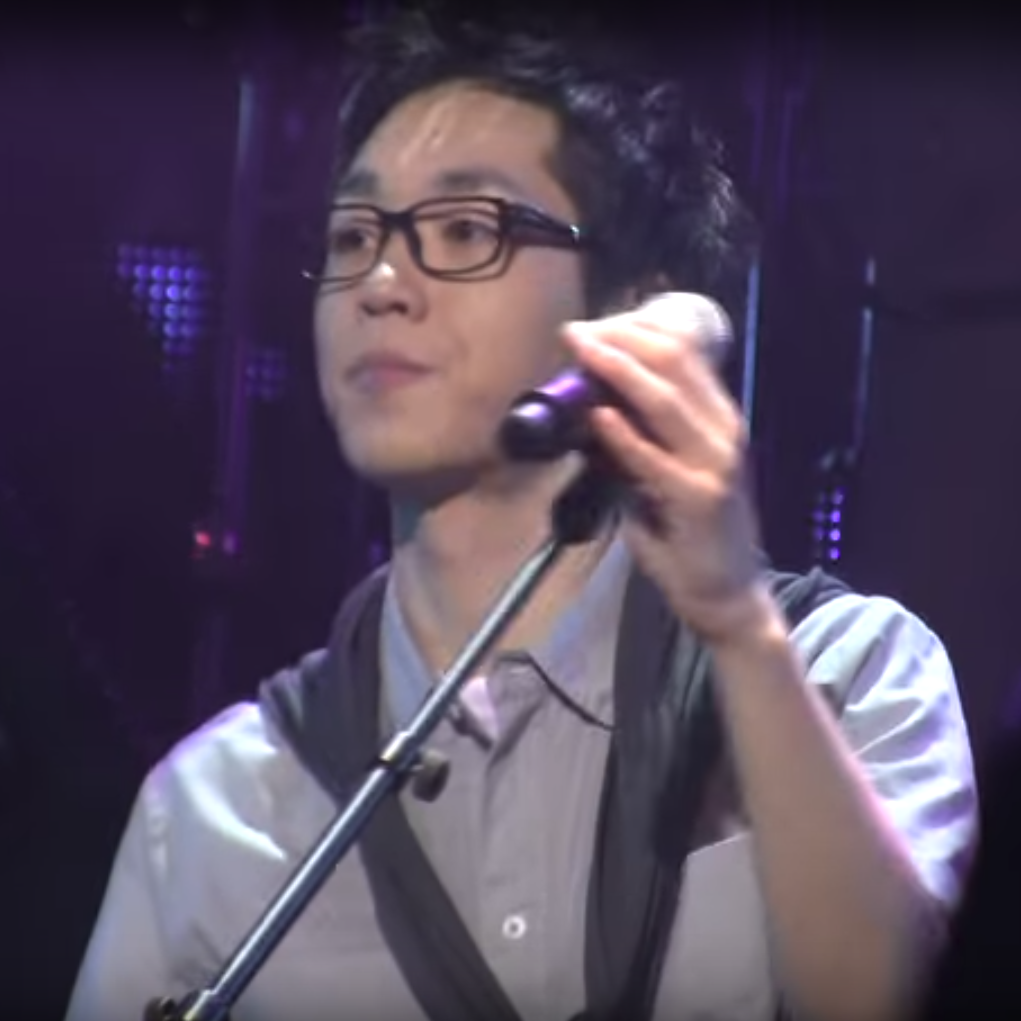
- Lee Seok-hoon performing in 2016.
- Born: February 21, 1984 (age 42); Pohang, South Korea
- Education: Dong-ah Institute of Media and Arts
- Occupation: Singer · Musical actor · DJ
- Agent: C9 Entertainment
- Spouse: Choi Sun-a (m. 2014)
- Children: 1
- Musical career
- Genres: Pop; R&B
- Instruments: Vocals, piano
- Years active: 2006–present
- Label: Stone Music Entertainment
- Member of: SG Wannabe

- Lee Seok-hoon
- Hangul: 이석훈
- Hanja: 李碩薰
- RR: I Seokhun
- MR: I Sŏkhun

Lee Seok-hoon (born February 21, 1984) is a South Korean singer and a member of the trio SG Wannabe. He is also active as a solo artist and musical actor. Alongside his solo activities, he has appeared on various music variety shows such as Immortal Songs: Singing the Legend, King of Mask Singer, Fantastic Duo, Duet Song Festival, Vocal Play and Miss Back as either a performer or a guest judge.

== Early life ==
Born in Pohang, Lee was raised in Incheon and attended Dong-ah Institute of Media and Arts, where he was a student of Kim Yeon-woo. Before debuting with SG Wannabe he had worked as a backing vocalist and vocal coach and was a frequent performer in the Hongdae area's club scene. He was already known to music industry scouts for his singing ability by the time he auditioned to join SG Wannabe.

== Career ==
With the impending departure of Chae Dong-ha from SG Wannabe, the group's label Mnet Media secretly held an audition to find his replacement and Lee heard about it by word of mouth from notable producer and composer Kim Do-hoon, now co-CEO of RBW. At that time, he was planning to debut as a solo artist and had contributed a soundtrack for the SBS drama Lovers. He was selected out of several hundred candidates and officially revealed by the label as the new member in April 2008. His first appearance was in the group's fifth studio album My Friend. Because Chae had abruptly left the group in the midst of preparing for the album, Lee only had several months to rehearse and record his parts and film the music video for the lead single "Lalala".

In 2009 Lee was a guest cast member on We Got Married 2 where he was paired with Kim Na-young after his bandmate Kim Yong-jun asked him to go on a blind date. In 2010 he became the first member to go solo with the release of his EP Greeting, which received positive reviews and also performed well in the Gaon Charts. The EP was originally intended to be a full-length studio album but some of the unfinished tracks were accidentally deleted. The songs "Station" (정거장) and "Ten Reasons I Love You" (그대를 사랑하는 10가지 이유) remained in the Gaon Digital Chart for over two months. From 2011 to 2015, SG Wannabe was on hiatus as each member focused on his solo career and fulfilled their mandatory military service obligations. Lee released his second EP and participated in several popular drama soundtracks. He also went into radio and was the regular DJ of SBS Power FM's late night program Ten Ten Club from 2011 to 2012 and a relief DJ on various radio programs over the years.

In January 2013 Lee enlisted for mandatory military service and was initially designated as a "celebrity soldier" assigned exclusively to public relations duties. After a series of controversies involving several of his contemporaries, the system was abolished that same year and all celebrities in the unit were designated as infantrymen and sent to various infantry units. Lee was assigned to the 7th Infantry Division based in Hwacheon County, Gangwon Province and discharged in October 2014. With SG Wannabe preparing their comeback, he focused his attention on group activities as the members were much more involved with the production and composition process.

Lee was one of the two main vocal trainers in Mnet's survival programs Produce 101 (season 2) (2017) and Produce X 101 (2019). After his appearances on the Produce 101 franchise programs, some of his previous releases have seen renewed interest, with "Ten Reasons I Love You" becoming a popular noraebang (karaoke) song, placing in the Gaon Noraebang Chart since 2017 and being named by several commentators in their list of best songs to sing in a noraebang. In 2017 he made his solo comeback with the release of his third EP, featuring the song "She", which he dedicated to his wife, as the lead single. He composed and released the song "It Was You" (너였구나) to celebrate the birth of their son the following year. In 2018 Lee made his debut in musical theater and was cast as the male lead in Kinky Boots. In 2019 Lee recorded one of the longest winning streaks on King of Mask Singer, winning the crown and then defending it a record five consecutive times. He was double-cast in the popular Korean adaptation of The Man Who Laughs as Gwynplaine, the male lead, in its second run from January to March 2020. His critically acclaimed performance won him a nomination for the Best New Male Actor at the 5th Korean Musical Awards.

For the early half of 2021 Lee was a guest DJ for various radio programs, including covering for Jun Hyo-seong when she was in self-isolation after coming into contact with a suspected COVID-19 case. He was cast in Marie Antoinette as the eponymous character's friend Swedish nobleman Axel von Fersen the Younger; the critically-acclaimed domestic production ran for the third time and opened on July 13. In May, he returned to radio and took over Kang Susie as DJ for MBC's music-focused program Wonderful Radio.

On March 9, 2022, it was confirmed that Lee will release his first full album Same Place via SNS on March 24, 2022.

On October 21, 2022, it was announced that Lee will release his new album "ALIVE" on November 7.

== Personal life ==
Lee is married to ballerina Choi Sun-a, a former member of the Korea National Ballet, and they have a son (born in August 2018). They first met on the MBC dating program Exciting Love Studio (두근두근 사랑의 스튜디오) in 2011 and continued their relationship off-screen. The couple secretly registered their marriage in 2014 while he was still in the army and later had a private wedding ceremony in January 2016.

== Discography ==
=== Studio albums ===
| Title | Album details | Peak chart positions | Sales |
| Title | Album details | KOR (Note: The Recording Industry Association of Korea (RIAK) tracked physical album, EP, and singles sales and released a consolidated sales and ranking chart monthly from January 1999 to September 2008. It did not track digital sales. The Gaon Music Chart was established in 2010 and is compiled by the Korea Music Content Industry Association, the successor organization of the RIAK. From January 2018, the Gaon Music Chart no longer publicizes sales figures but utilizes an index which accumulates sales figures from both physical and digital sales.) | Sales |
|---|---|---|---|
| As a Man Rather Than a Friend | Released: January 18, 2013; Label: Jellyfish Entertainment; Formats: CD, digital download | 16 | KOR: 2,596 |
| Same Place | Released: March 24, 2022; Label: C9 Entertainment; Formats: CD, digital download | 20 | KOR: 8,714 |

=== Extended plays ===
| Title | EP details | Peak chart positions | Sales |
| Title | EP details | KOR | Sales |
|---|---|---|---|
| Greeting | Released: April 22, 2010; Label: IS Entertainment; Formats: CD, digital download | — | |
| Different Hello | Released: October 4, 2012; Label: Jellyfish Entertainment; Formats: CD, digital download | 5 | KOR: 4,715 |
| You & Yours | Released: June 15, 2017; Label: B2M Entertainment, Stone Music Entertainment; Formats: CD, digital download | 31 | KOR: 1,186 |
| Untitled | Released: October 16, 2023; Label: C9 Entertainment, Kakao Entertainment; Formats: CD, digital download | 28 | KOR: 5,470 |
| Renewed Purpose | Released: August 26, 2025; Label: C9 Entertainment, Kakao Entertainment; Formats: CD, digital download, streaming | 52 | KOR: 1,504 |
"—" denotes release did not chart.

=== Singles and charted songs ===
| Title | Year | Peak chart positions | Sales (DL) | Album |
| Title | Year | KOR | Sales (DL) | Album |
|---|---|---|---|---|
| "Lie" (거짓말) | 2006 | | | Lovers OST |
| "Nostalgic Face" (그리운 얼굴) | 2009 | | | Paradise OST |
| "Ten Reasons I Love You" (그대를 사랑하는 10가지 이유) | 2010 | 9 | | Greeting |
| "Station" (정거장) | 2010 | 39 | | Greeting |
| "How Do I Do" (어떡하죠 난) Min Kyung-hoon feat. Lee Seok-hoon | 2011 | | | Picnic (소풍) |
| "It's Christmas" (크리스마스니까) with Sung Si-kyung, Park Hyo-shin, Seo In-guk and VIXX | 2012 | 1 | KOR: 957,439+ | Jelly Christmas 2012 HEART PROJECT |
| "Don't Leave Me" (사랑하면 안돼요) | 2012 | 34 | KOR: 198,675+ | Missing You OST (part 4) |
| "As a Man Rather Than a Friend" (친구 아닌 남자로) | 2013 | 12 | KOR: 267,355+ | As a Man Rather Than a Friend |
| "Today Was Better Than Yesterday" (오늘은 어제보다 괜찮았지) | 2013 | 56 | KOR: 79,987+ | Non-album single |
| "I'll Be There" | 2016 | 49 | KOR: 75,492+ | Another Miss Oh OST (part 6) |
| "Today Was Better Than Yesterday" (오늘은 어제보다 괜찮았지) (Re-released) | 2017 | — | | Dr. Romantic OST (part 5) |
| "You and I" (우리라는 세상) | 2017 | — | | Confession Couple OST (part 5) |
| "Healing" Featuring Bubble Dia | 2018 | — | | Money Flower OST (part 5) |
| "Story" | 2018 | — | | Radio Romance OST (part 5) |
| "It's Alright" (괜찮아) | 2018 | — | | Partners for Justice OST (part 4) |
| "It Was You" (너였구나) | 2018 | — | | Non-album singles |
| "Don't Love Me" (사랑하지 말아요) Produced with Rocoberry | 2019 | 70 | | Non-album singles |
| "What If" (완벽한 날) | 2019 | — | | Non-album singles |
| "The Reason" (그 이유) | 2019 | — | | Partners for Justice 2 OST (part 4) |
| "Come" (어서와) | 2019 | — | | Rookie Historian Goo Hae-ryung OST (part 3) |
| "Don't Forget the Moment We Loved" (우리 사랑했던 추억을 아직 잊지 말아요) | 2019 | — | | Non-album single |
| "This Is Seoul" (서울 이곳은) | 2020 | — | | Forest OST (part 3) |
| "Only You" (내가 네게 하나 바라는 건) | 2020 | — | | Non-album single |
| "Words of Winter" (겨울이 건네는 말) With Captain Planet | 2020 | — | | [Tint; 004] Christmas Red |
| "Autumn Memories" (가을상자) With Jo Yu-ri | 2021 | 193 | | Non-album single |
| "Love Again" (사랑은 또) | 2022 | — | | Same Place |
| "Dear, My Fool" (바보에게 바보가) | 2022 | 31 | | Discovery of Romance OST |
"—" denotes release did not chart.

== Songwriting credits ==
Lee has 15 songwriting credits registered with the Korea Music Copyright Association (KOMCA). All credits are adapted from KOMCA, unless stated otherwise.

| Year | Song | Album | Artist | With | Notes |
|---|---|---|---|---|---|
| 2010 | 하고싶은말 | 인사; Greeting | Lee Seok-hoon | Ahn Young-min | Writer, co-composer |
| 2013 | "Your Seat" (당신의자리) | 친구 아닌 남자로; As a Man Rather Than a Friend | Lee Seok-hoon | Ahn Young-min | Writer, co-composer |
| 2015 | "Those Days" (그때) | The Voice | SG Wannabe | Park Deok-sang | Writer, co-composer |
| 2016 | "I'm Missing You" | Our Days | SG Wannabe | SG Wannabe (Kim Yong-jun, Kim Jin-ho) | Co-writer |
| 2016 | "After You're Gone" (나를 떠나요) | Our Days | SG Wannabe | | Writer, composer |
| 2016 | "Memory Lane" (습관처럼) | Our Days | SG Wannabe | SG Wannabe (Kim Yong-jun, Kim Jin-ho) | Writer, co-composer |
| 2016 | "Father" (탄생) | Our Days | SG Wannabe | Kim Jin-ho | Co-composer |
| 2017 | "SHE" | you & yours | Lee Seok-hoon | Rocoberry | Co-writer, co-composer |
| 2017 | "Travel" (여행) | you & yours | Lee Seok-hoon | Conan, Captain Planet | Co-writer, co-composer |
| 2017 | "Greed" (욕심) | you & yours | Lee Seok-hoon | Captain Planet | Writer, co-composer |
| 2018 | "Our Song" (우리의노래) | Let's Meet Up Now 만나자 | SG Wannabe | Lee Byung-ho, Choi Su-ji | Co-composer |
| 2018 | "It Was You" (너였구나) | Non-album single | Lee Seok-hoon | Captain Planet | Writer, co-composer |
| 2019 | "Strange" (이상해) | I Hate You Juliet OST | Apink BnN (Bomi and Namjoo) | Captain Planet | Co-composer |
| 2019 | "What If" (완벽한 날) | Non-album single | Lee Seok-hoon | Song Yang-ha, Kim Jae-hyun | Co-writer |
| 2020 | "Words of Winter" (겨울이건네는말) | [Tint; 004] Christmas Red | Lee Seok-hoon with Captain Planet | Lee Ji-hye, Jung Se-hee, Im Su-rin, JQ | Co-writer |

== Theater ==
| Year | English title | Korean title | Role | Ref. |
|---|---|---|---|---|
| 2021 | Marie Antoinette | 마리 앙투아네트 | Count Fergen | |
| 2021–2022 | A Gentleman's Guide to Love and Murder | 젠틀맨스 가이드 | Monty Navarro | |
| 2022 | Kinky Boots | 킹키부츠 | Charlie | |

== Filmography ==
=== Television show ===
| Year | Title | Role | Notes | Ref. |
|---|---|---|---|---|
| 2021 | Honeymoon Tavern | Guest | | |
| 2021 | Hotter than Summer - Women's Basketball Summer League 72 Hours | Narrator | | |
| 2021 | Tomorrow's National Singer | judge | | |
| 2021 | The Masked Talent | Judge | MBC Chuseok's special | |
| 2022 | Baby Singer | Teacher | | |
| 2022 | Miracle in Spring | Host | | |
| 2022 | MBC Riverside Song Festival New Challenge | Judges | Music festival in 22 years | |
| 2022 | Dating is Straight | Host | | |
| 2022 | Map to Go Again | Cast Member | | |
| 2022 | Suspicious Bookstore East West South Book | Host | | |
| 2022 | Burning Trotman | Judge | | |
| 2023 | Boys Planet | Vocal master | | |
| 2023 | Monthly The Stage | Host | | |
| 2023 | Solo Reunion Recital | Host | | |
| 2024 | Build Up: Vocal Boy Group Survival | Judge | | |

=== Web shows ===
| Year | Title | Role | Notes | Ref. |
|---|---|---|---|---|
| 2022 | Sulfly | Host | | |
| 2022 | Between Marriage and Divorce | Host | | |
| 2022 | The Tattooist | Store manager | with Monica | |

=== Radio shows ===
| Year | Title | Role | Note | Ref. |
|---|---|---|---|---|
| 2011–2012 | Lee Seok-hoon's Tenten Club | DJ | April 4–29, 2012 | |
| 2013 | Loyalty! My Friend, this is Lee Seok-hoon | DJ | April 1 – July 4 | |
| 2021–2022 | Wonderful Radio I'm Lee Seok-hoon | DJ | May 31, 2021– March 27, 2022 | |
| 2022–present | Lee Seok-hoon's Brunch Cafe | DJ | March 28, 2022–present | |

=== Music video appearances ===
| Year | Song Title | Artist | Ref. |
|---|---|---|---|
| 2022 | "Love Again" (사랑은 또) | Lee Seok-hoon | |

== Ambassadorship ==
- Ambassador of Public Relations to Seoul (2023)

== Awards and nominations ==
Name of the award ceremony, year presented, category, nominee of the award, and the result of the nomination
| Award ceremony | Year | Category | Nominee / Work | Result | Ref. |
|---|---|---|---|---|---|
| Brand of the Year Awards | 2021 | Male Vocalist | Lee Seok-hoon | Won | |
| MBC Entertainment Awards | 2022 | Rookie Award in Radio Category | Lee Seokhoon's Brunch Cafe | Won | |
| Seoul Success Awards | 2021 | Singer Award | Lee Seok-hoon | Won | |
