= Ha Seok-jin =

South Korean actor (born 1982)

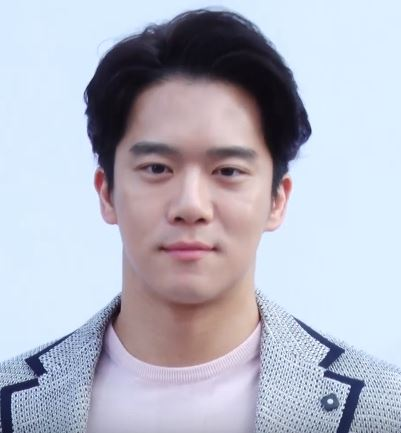
- Ha in June 2019
- Born: March 4, 1982 (age 44); Bangi-dong, Songpa District, Seoul, South Korea
- Other name: Ha Suk-jin
- Education: Hanyang University
- Occupation: Actor
- Years active: 2005–present
- Agent: Management Koo

Korean name
- Hangul: 하석진
- RR: Ha Seokjin
- MR: Ha Sŏkchin

Ha Seok-jin (Korean: 하석진; born March 4, 1982) is a South Korean actor. He is best known for his roles in TV drama series such as Radiant Office (2017), Drinking Solo (2016), Shark (2013), and 4 Legendary Witches (2014), for which he received two nominations for the Excellence Award at the 2014 MBC Drama Awards and the 4th APAN Star Awards.

== Early life ==
Ha Seok-jin was born in Bangi-dong, Songpa District, Seoul, South Korea in 1982. He is the eldest of one son and one daughter. He entered the Department of Mechanical Engineering at Hanyang University and after completing his first year, he enlisted in the military.

== Career ==
After completing his military service as Combat Police in year 2002, Ha returned to school. However, a friend who was working at an entertainment production company suggested he try acting. At first, Ha declined the offer, preferring to focus on his studies. But eventually, he decided to give it a try and made his debut in the entertainment industry through a Korean Air advertisement in 2005. Although he didn't plan on pursuing acting as a career, he found it enjoyable and became increasingly attracted to it. In April 2019, he signed with C-JeS Entertainment, but his contract expired in 2021, prompting him to search for a new agency. In July 2021, he signed with Management Koo.

In September 2023, Ha was one of twelve celebrity contestants on the Netflix reality game show, The Devil's Plan; he was also the winner of the contest.

== Filmography ==
=== Film ===
Year	Title	Role	Notes	Ref.
2006	See You After School	Kang Jae-koo		
2006	Who Slept with Her	Kim Tae-yo		
2007	Unstoppable Marriage	Wang Ki-baek		
2008	Summer Whispers	Yoon-soo		
2016	Like for Likes	Kang Min-ho	Cameo	
2025	Run to You	Kang Goo-yeong		

=== Television series ===
Year	Title	Role	Notes	Ref.
2005	Sad Love Story	Ha Seok-jin		
2005	Princess Lulu	Seok-jin		
2006	Dr. Kkang	Kim Jin-kyu		
2006	Korea Secret Agency	Himself		
2007	If in Love... Like Them	Kang-deo		
2007	Hello! Miss	Hwang Chan-min		
2007	Drama City – "Abduction of Football"	Park Jung-woo		
2008	I am Happy	Kang-seok		
2009	What's for Dinner?	Kim Yoon-soo		
2010	The Great Merchant	Kang Yoo-ji		
2010	Once Upon a Time in Saengchori	Jo Min-sung		
2011	Can't Lose	Lee Tae-young		
2011	If Tomorrow Comes	Lee Young-gyun		
2012	Standby	Ha Seok-jin		
2012	My Kids Give Me a Headache	Ahn Sung-ki		
2013	Don't Look Back: The Legend of Orpheus	Oh Joon-young		
2013	Thrice Married Woman	Kim Jun-goo		
2014	4 Legendary Witches	Nam Woo-suk		
2015	D-Day	Han Woo-jin		
2016	After the Play Ends	Park-ryeok		
2016	Drinking Solo	Jin Jung-suk		
2016	Something About 1%	Lee Jae-in		
2017	Radiant Office	Seo Woo-jin		
2018	A Poem a Day	Ha Seok-jin	Cameo (Episode 11)	
2018	Your House Helper	Kim Ji-woon		
2019	Crash Landing on You	Ri Moo-hyuk		
2020	When I Was the Most Beautiful	Seo-jin		
2021	Monthly Magazine Home	Model	Cameo (Episode 11)	
2021	The Red Sleeve	Janghwa Hongryeonjeon Sato	Cameo (Episode 1)	
2022	Blind	Ryu Sung-hoon		
2026	Love on the Menu	Kim Mu-jin		

=== Web series ===
Year	Title	Role	Ref.
2021	A DeabEAT's Meal	Kim Jae-ho	

=== Television shows ===
Year	Title	Role	Ref.
2010	The Fox's Butler	Cast member	
2015–2020	Hot Brain: Problematic Men	Cast member	
2016	After The Show Ends	Cast member	
2021	The Dreamers	Host	
2022	Local Dining Table	Host	
2022	Suspicious Neighbor	Host	
2022	The Dreamers	Host	

=== Web shows ===
Year	Title	Role	Notes	Ref.
2021	The Year, Career	Host	Channel tvN Studio D	
2023	The Devil's Plan	Player (Winner)	Netflix	
2025	Crime Scene Zero	Player	Netflix	
2026	The Devil's Plan: Dead Again (ongoing)	Player	Netflix	

=== Music video appearances ===
Year	Song title	Artist
2005	"As We Live"	SG Wannabe
2005	"Sin and Punishment"	SG Wannabe
2006	"Because I Love You"	SG Wannabe & SeeYa
2007	"Stay"	SG Wannabe
2008	"I Miss You"	SG Wannabe
2013	"슬픈약속 (That's My Fault)"	Speed
2013	"It's Over"	Speed
2015	"Along the Days"	Huh Gak

== Awards and nominations ==
Year	Award	Category	Nominated work	Result
2008	44th Baeksang Arts Awards	Best New Actor (TV)	I am Happy	Nominated
2008	SBS Drama Awards	New Star Award	I am Happy	Won
2014	MBC Drama Awards	Excellence Award, Actor in a Special Project Drama	4 Legendary Witches	Nominated
2014	SBS Drama Awards	Excellence Award, Actor in a Serial Drama	Thrice Married Woman	Nominated
2015	4th APAN Star Awards	Excellence Award, Actor in a Serial Drama	4 Legendary Witches	Nominated
2017	53rd Baeksang Arts Awards	Most Popular Actor (Television)	Drinking Solo	Nominated
2017	MBC Drama Awards	Top Excellence Award, Actor in Miniseries	Radiant Office	Nominated
2018	KBS Drama Awards	Top Excellence Award, Actor in Miniseries	Your House Helper	Nominated
2020	2020 MBC Drama Awards	Excellence Award, Actor in a Wednesday-Thursday Miniseries	When I Was the Most Beautiful	Nominated
