= MAMA Award for Album of the Year =

Korean music award

- Awarded for: Top recording albums
- Country: South Korea
- Presented by: CJ E&M (Mnet)
- First award: 2006
- Currently held by: Stray Kids – Karma (2025)
- Website: MAMA Awards

The MAMA Award for Album of the Year (Korean: 올해의 앨범상; RR: Olhaeui aelbeomsang) is a daesang (or grand prize) award presented by CJ E&M (Mnet) at the annual MAMA Awards. It was first awarded at the 8th Mnet Asian Music Awards ceremony held in 2006; SG Wannabe won the award for their album The 3rd Masterpiece, and it is given in honor of a solo or group with the best recording album in the music industry released during the year.

== Winners and nominees ==
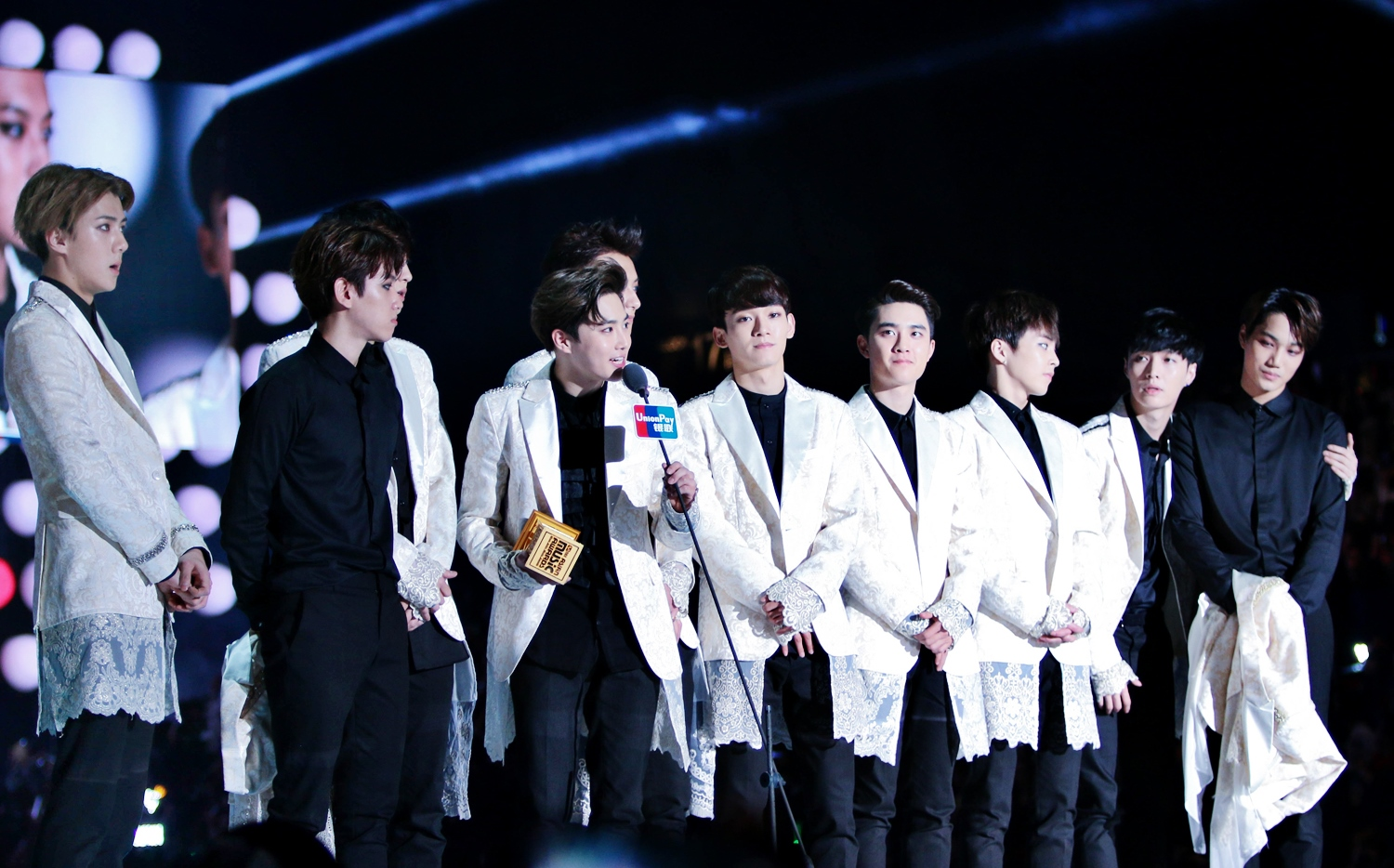
Exo won the award for five consecutive years (2013–17)

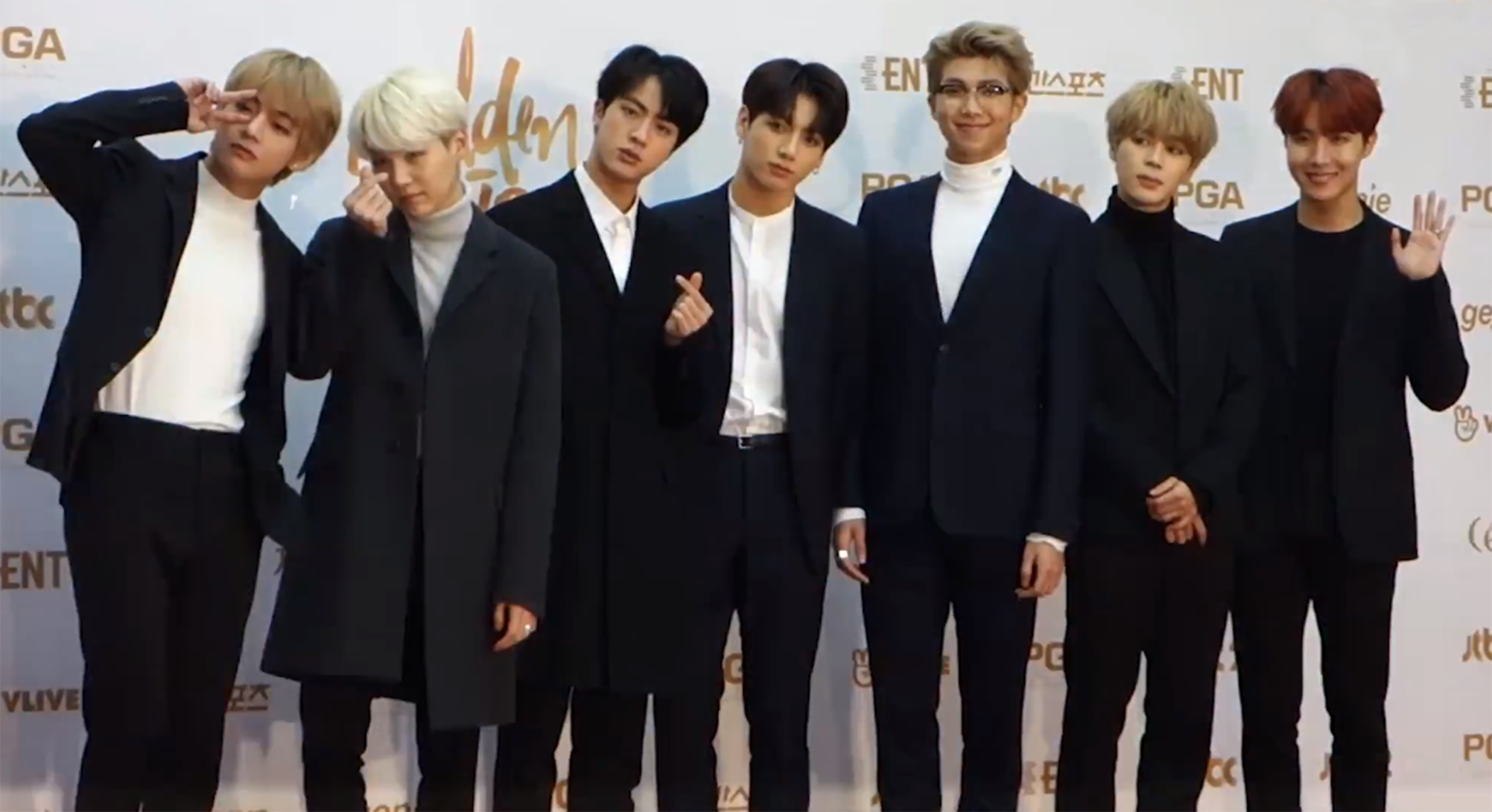
Five-time recipient BTS (2018–22)

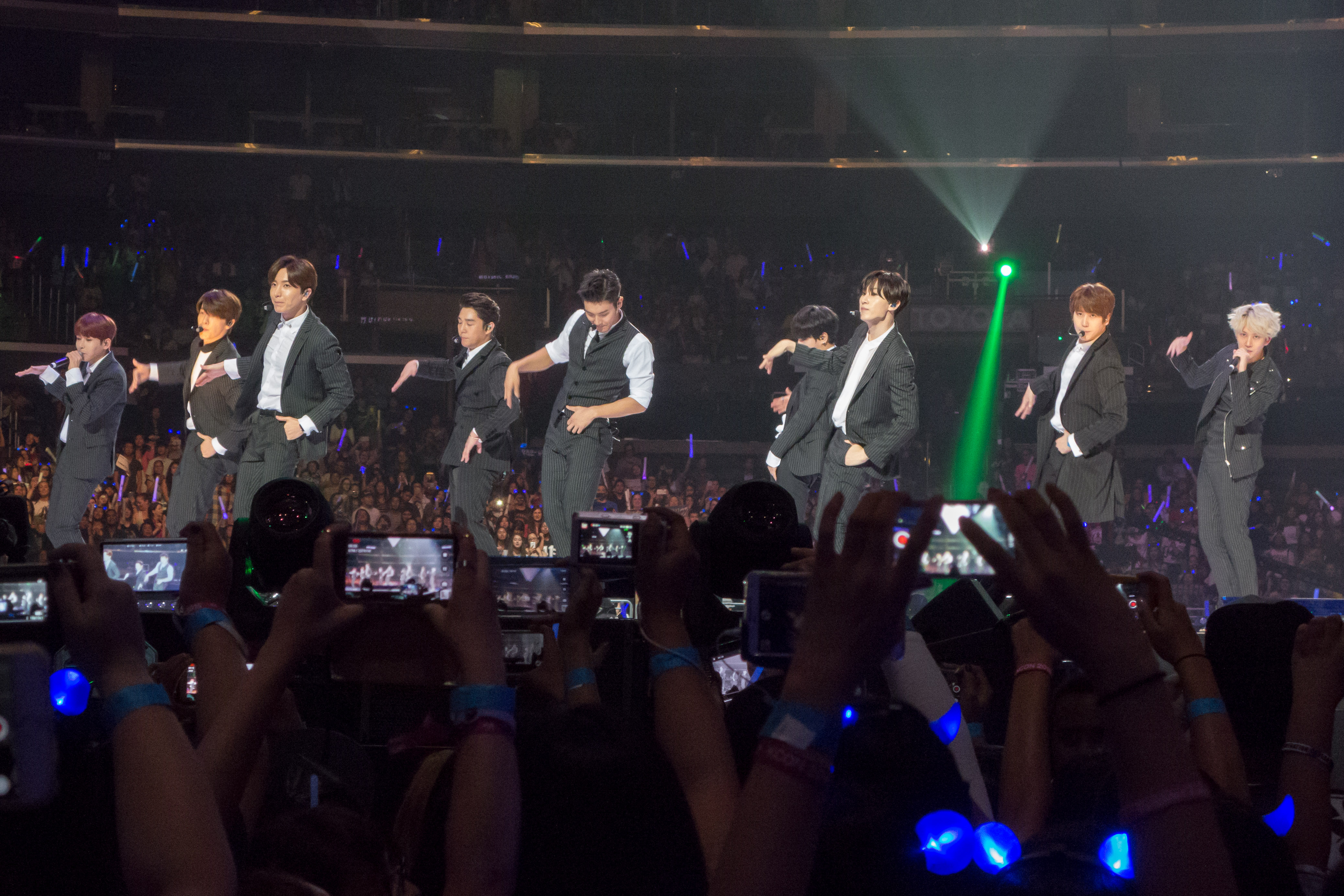
Super Junior (2011–12)

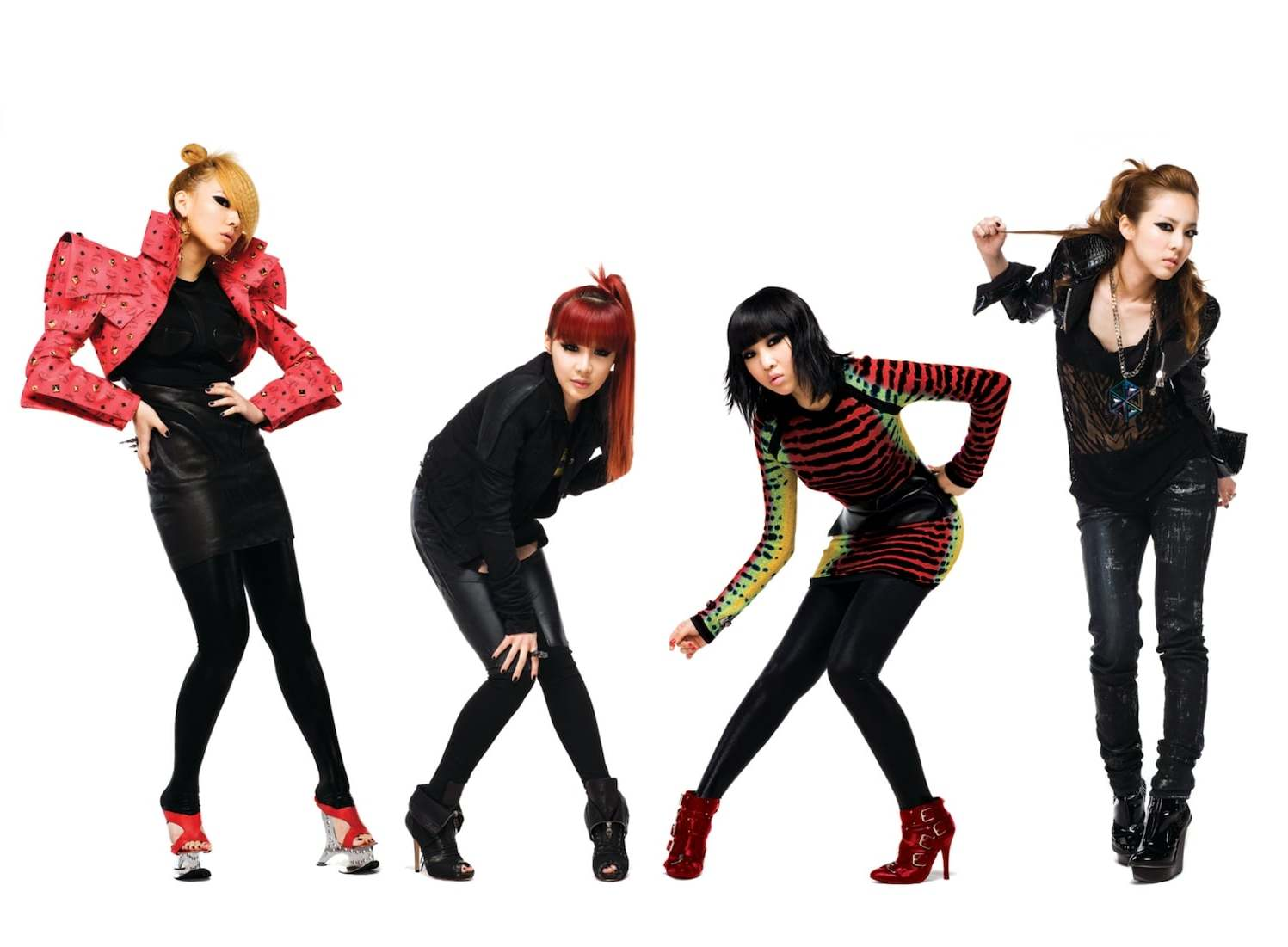
2NE1, the only female recipient of the award since its launch in 2006

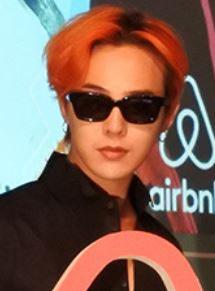
G-Dragon is the only soloist who has received the award

=== 2000s ===
Year	Winner(s)	Winning Album	Nominee(s)
2006	SG Wannabe	The 3rd Masterpiece	Rain – Rain's World; Shinhwa – State of the Art; TVXQ – "O"-Jung.Ban.Hap.; Vibe – Re Feel
2007	Epik High	Remapping the Human Soul	Big Bang – Always; SG Wannabe – The Sentimental Chord; Wonder Girls – The Wonder Years; Yangpa – The Windows Of My Soul
2008	TVXQ	Mirotic	Brown Eyes – Two Things Needed For The Same Purpose And 5 Objects; Epik High – Pieces, Part One; Kim Dong-ryool – Monologue; Toy – Thank You
2009	G-Dragon	Heartbreaker	No nominees announced

=== 2010s ===
Year	Winner(s)	Winning Album	Nominee(s)
2010	2NE1	To Anyone	2AM – Can't Let You Go Even If I Die; BoA – Hurricane Venus; Super Junior – Bonamana; Taeyang – Solar
2011	Super Junior	Mr. Simple	2NE1 – 2NE1 2nd Mini Album; Big Bang- Tonight; Girls' Generation – The Boys; TVXQ – Keep Your Head Down
2012	Super Junior	Sexy, Free & Single	Big Bang – Alive; Busker Busker – Busker Busker 1st Album; G-Dragon – One of a Kind; TVXQ – Catch Me
2013	Exo	XOXO	Cho Yong-pil – Hello; G-Dragon – Coup D'Etat; Girls' Generation – I Got a Boy; Shinee – Chapter 1. Dream Girl – The Misconceptions of You
2014	Exo	Overdose	Beast – Good Luck; Girls' Generation – Mr.Mr.; Infinite – Season 2; Super Junior – Mamacita
2015	Exo	Exodus	Big Bang – Made; BTS – The Most Beautiful Moment In Life, Part 1; Shinee – Odd; Super Junior – Devil
2016	Exo	Ex'Act	BTS – Wings; Seventeen – Love & Letter; Shinee – 1 of 1; Twice – Page Two
2017	Exo	The War	BTS – Love Yourself: Her; Seventeen – Al1; Twice – Signal; Wanna One – 1×1=1 (To Be One)
2018	BTS	Love Yourself: Tear	Red Velvet – The Perfect Red Velvet; Seventeen – You Make My Day; Twice – What Is Love?; Wanna One – 0+1=1 (I Promise You)
2019	BTS	Map of the Soul: Persona	Blackpink – Kill This Love; Exo – Don't Mess Up My Tempo; Seventeen – An Ode; Twice – Fancy You

=== 2020s ===
Year	Winner(s)	Winning Album	Nominee(s)
2020	BTS	Map of the Soul: 7	Blackpink – The Album; Baekhyun – Delight; IU – Love Poem; Seventeen – Heng:garæ
2021	BTS	Be	NCT 127 – Sticker; Aespa – Savage; IU – Lilac; NCT Dream – Hot Sauce
2022	BTS	Proof	Blackpink – Born Pink; NCT Dream – Glitch Mode; Seventeen – Face the Sun; Stray Kids – Maxident
2023	Seventeen	FML	NCT Dream – ISTJ; NewJeans – Get Up; Stray Kids – 5-Star; Tomorrow X Together – The Name Chapter: Temptation
2024	Seventeen	Seventeenth Heaven	Enhypen – Romance: Untold; Jung Kook – Golden; Stray Kids – Rock-Star; Tomorrow X Together – The Name Chapter: Freefall
2025	Stray Kids	Karma	Enhypen – Desire: Unleash; Riize – Odyssey; Seventeen – Spill the Feels; Tomorrow X Together – The Star Chapter: Together

== Records ==
=== Most awards ===
Awards	Act
5	Exo
5	BTS
2	Super Junior
2	Seventeen

=== Most nominations ===
Nominations	Act
9	Seventeen
8	BTS
6	Exo
5	Big Bang
5	Stray Kids
5	Super Junior
5	TVXQ
5	Twice
3	Blackpink
3	G-Dragon
3	Girls' Generation
3	NCT Dream
3	Shinee
3	Tomorrow X Together
2	2NE1
2	Enhypen
2	Epik High
2	IU
2	SG Wannabe

== See also ==
- Melon Music Award for Album of the Year
