= Kim Jin-ho (singer) =

South Korean singer (born 1986)

- 김진호
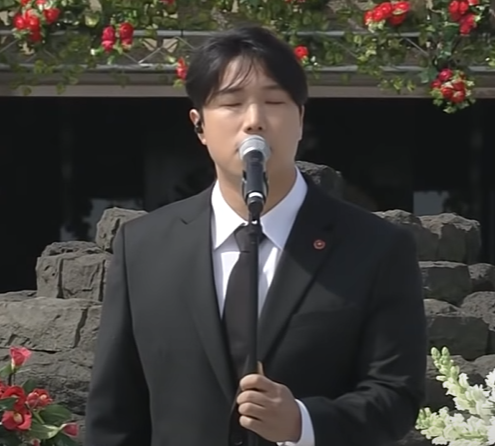
- Kim in 2020
- Born: Kim Jin-ho; May 21, 1986 (age 39); Seoul, South Korea
- Occupations: Singer; Actor
- Musical career
- Genres: Pop; R&B
- Instrument: Vocal
- Years active: 2004–present
- Labels: Stone Music Entertainment

- Kim Jin-ho
- Hangul: 김진호
- Hanja: 金振浩
- RR: Gim Jinho
- MR: Kim Chinho

Kim Jin-ho (Korean: 김진호; born May 21, 1986) is a South Korean singer. He is a member of the band SG Wannabe. He released his first solo album, Today on February 14, 2013. His first solo concert tour on March 27 to 28, 2013, in support of his first studio album Today (2013).

== Personal life ==
On July 29, 2022, it was confirmed that Kim will get married with a non-celebrity, who is younger than him, on October 23.

== Discography ==
=== Studio albums ===
Title	Album details	Peak chart positions	Sales
Title	Album details	KOR	Sales
Today (오늘)	Released: February 14, 2013; Label: Munit Entertainment; Formats: CD, digital download	3	KOR: 5,233
People (사람들)	Released: September 17, 2014; Label: Moksolee Entertainment; Formats: CD, digital download	13	KOR: 2,476
Song Spring (노래샘)	Released: October 3, 2019; Label: Moksolee Entertainment; Formats: CD, digital download	41	TBA
"—" denotes release did not chart.

=== Extended plays ===
Title	Album details	Peak chart positions	Sales
Title	Album details	KOR	Sales
Hangang Love (한강愛 (애))	Released: July 18, 2013; Label: Munit Entertainment; Formats: CD, digital download	7	KOR: 4,457

=== Singles ===
Title	Year	Peak chart positions	Sales (DL)	Album
Title	Year	KOR	Sales (DL)	Album
"Unbelievable" with Miji	2011	66	KOR: 52,646	Non-album single
"Do You Know" (알고있니)	2013	41	KOR: 98,606	Today
"Chimac" (치맥)	2013	—	KOR: 22,079	Hangang Love
"The Best of Me" (Korean version)	2013	81	KOR: 30,646	Hitman Project #7
"People" (사람들)	2014	—	KOR: 18,320	People
"Graduation Picture" (졸업사진)	2017	92	KOR: 22,363	Non-album singles
"Mom in the Garden" (엄마의 프로필 사진은 왜 꽃밭일까)	2019	—	—	Non-album singles
"Firecrackers and Stars" (폭죽과)	2019	—	—	Song Spring
"—" denotes release did not chart.
