= SG Wanna Be+ =

Studio album by SG Wannabe
- Released: January 20, 2004
- Genre: K-pop
- Language: Korean
- Label: Mnet Media
- Producer: Cho Young-chul, Lee Min-soo

SG Wannabe chronology
SG Wanna Be+ (2004)	Saldaga (2005)

Singles from SG Wannabe
- 1. "Timeless" Released: January 20, 2004; 2. "I Loved You To Death" Released: January 20, 2004

SG Wanna Be+ is SG Wannabe's first Korean studio album, released on January 20, 2004. It was produced by Lee Kyung-sub, Park Geun-tae and other famous music producers in South Korea. The group gained a reputation for being quite mysterious because they did not show their faces and did not star in any of their music videos. Nevertheless, their vocal abilities attracted many fans, and the album was an instant hit with pre-sales of 90,000 copies. Later in 2004, the group was recognized for their vocal ability with numerous awards, including the PAVV Best Newcomer at the Golden Disk Awards and the Seoul Popular Music Awards. Their music video also won Best Picture. The album has sold a total of 211,918 copies.

== Music videos ==
A total of four music videos were produced for this album, "Timeless" and "I Loved You To Death", which was a two-part music video, "Don't Know Why" and "It was Good That We Loved".

The title track's music video for the album attracted media attention, as it featured top actors such as Sul Kyung-gu and Kim Nam-jin, and actresses Kim Yun-jin, Kang Hye-jung, and Seo Sung-min. The production costs were reportedly about 2 billion won. "Timeless" was the first part of the drama MV, while "I Loved You To Death" was the second part.

== Notable tracks ==
=== "Timeless" ===
"Timeless" was SG Wannabe's debut track and was written by Kang Eun-kyung and composed by Park Geun-tae. The song is a medium-tempo R&B track.

=== "I Loved You to Death" ===
"I Loved You to Death" was also potentially SG Wannabe's debut track. Instead, "Timeless" became SG Wannabe's debut track. The ballad, "I Loved You to Death" was the group's sub-title track.

== Track listing ==
No.	Title	Writer(s)	Arrangements	Length
1.	"Timeless"		Cho Young Soo
2.	"죽을 만큼 사랑했어요" ("I Loved You To Death")		Lee Kyung-sub
3.	"사랑하고 싶어" ("I Want to Love")		Cho Young Soo
4.	"금기" ("Taboo")		Yoon Il Sang
5.	"어린 사랑" ("Young Love")		Lee Kyung-sub
6.	"사랑하길 정말 잘했어요" ("It was Good That We Loved")		Cho Young Soo
7.	"Don't Know Why" (Rap by Jeong I-deun)		Lee Kyung-sub
8.	"믿을께요" ("I'll Believe")	Rap by Jeong I-deun	Lee Kyung-sub
9.	"하지만" ("But")		Cho Young Soo
10.	"그때까지만" ("Until Then")		Jung Tae Woo
11.	"요즘 넌" ("Lately You")		Cho Young Soo
12.	"우습지" ("It's Funny")		Han Sung Ho

=== Special Edition ===
No.	Title	Lyrics	Music	Arrangements	Length
1.	"Timeless (뮤직2.0 Real Session)"	Kang Eun-kyung	Park Geun-tae	Cho Young Soo
2.	"죽을만큼 사랑했어요 (뮤직2.0 Real Session)" ("I Loved You To Death")	Lee Kyung-sub	Lee Kyung-sub	Lee Kyung-sub
3.	"사랑하길 정말 잘했어요 (뮤직2.0 Real Session)" ("It was Good That We Loved")	Ahn Young Min	Park Geun-tae, Cho Young Soo	Cho Young Soo
4.	"어린사랑 (뮤직2.0 Real Session)" ("Young Love")	Han Sung Ho	Lee Kyung-sub	Lee Kyung-sub
5.	"Timeless (Unplugged)"	Kang Eun-kyung	Park Geun-tae	Cho Young Soo
6.	"죽을만큼 사랑했어요 (Unplugged)" ("I Loved You To Death")	Lee Kyung-sub	Lee Kyung-sub	Lee Kyung-sub
7.	"Timeless (Guitar Instrumental)"	–	Park Geun-tae	Cho Young Soo
8.	"죽을만큼 사랑했어요 (Guitar Instrumental)" ("I Loved You To Death")	–	Lee Kyung-sub	Lee Kyung-sub
