= SG Wannabe by SG Wannabe 7 Part.II =

EP by SG Wannabe
- Released: March 14, 2011
- Genre: K-pop
- Length: 19:20
- Language: Korean
- Label: CJE&M

SG Wannabe chronology
SG Wannabe by SG Wannabe 7 Part.I (2010)	SG Wannabe by SG Wannabe 7 Part.II (2011)	The Voice (2015)

Singles from SG Wannabe
- 1. "Road of the Passion" Released: November 25, 2010; 2. "Just" Released: March 18, 2011

SG Wannabe by SG Wannabe 7 Part.II is the second part of the seventh Korean studio album by SG Wannabe. IS Entermedia will be releasing 10,000 copies of a limited edition. SG Wannabe's representative said, "3 out of the 6 songs listed in the album were in competition to be the title song. These are "Song to Confess to You", "If We Can Love Again", and "Just." The songs will only be performed at SG Wannabe's concerts.

== Music videos ==
The music video for "Just", was released on March 18, 2011 and features the three members.

== Track listing ==
No.	Title	Lyrics	Music	{{{extra_column}}}	Length
1.	"너에게 고백하는 노래" ("Song Confessing To You")	Ahn Young Min	Ahn Young Min	Lee Yoo Jin	4:04
2.	"다시 사랑할 수 있다면" ("If I Can Love Again")	Maybee	Kim Gun Woo	Song Gi Hong	4:04
3.	"고작" ("Just")	MINUKI	Jeon Hae Seong	Jeon Hae Seong	3:57
4.	"사랑이 떠나도" ("Even If Love Leaves")	Cho Young Soo	Cho Young Soo	Cho Young Soo	3:30
5.	"보낸다" ("Sending Away")	Min Yeon Jae	Lee Jae Hak	Lee Jae Hak	3:54
6.	"길" ("Road of the Passion")	The Name	The Name, Kim Bo Min	Kim Bo Min	3:48
Total length:					19:20
