= The 3rd Masterpiece =

Studio album by SG Wannabe
- Released: April 8, 2006
- Genre: R&B
- Language: Korean
- Label: Mnet Media
- Producer: Cho Young-chul, Lee Min-soo

SG Wannabe chronology
Classic Odyssey (2005)	The 3rd Masterpiece (2006)	The Precious History (2006)

Singles from SG Wannabe
- 1. "Untouchable" Released: December 1, 2005; 2. "Gone With The Wind" Released: December 1, 2005; 3. "Partner for Life" Released: April 8, 2006

Alternative cover
- Digital single cover for "Untouchable" and "Gone With The Wind"

The 3rd Masterpiece is the third Korean studio album by South Korean male vocal group SG Wannabe. The record was a commercial success in South Korea, peaking at number one on the monthly MIAK album chart for two consecutive months and sold over 311,000 copies by the end of the year. It was the second best-selling album of 2006 according to MIAK, only behind TVXQ's "O"-Jung.Ban.Hap which sold 349,317 copies.

The 3rd Masterpiece won Album of the Year at the 2006 Mnet KM Music Festival, while its lead single "Partner for Life" won Song of the Year at the same ceremony and Digital Daesang (Song of the Year) at the 21st Golden Disc Awards.

== Music videos ==
Similar to what they did in their second album (the music video had two parts; the first part was with the song "Crime and Punishment" ("죄와벌"), while the second part was with the song "As We Live" ("살다가")), their third album also contained two-part music videos. The first part was with their new title song, "Partner for Life" (내 사람) starring Shinhwa's Kim Dong Wan and also featuring Jeong So-Young, and the second part was released with "Slowpoke" ("느림보").

== Accolades ==
Awards and nominations
Year	Organization	Award	Nominee	Result	Ref.
2006	Golden Disc Awards	Main Prize (Bonsang)	The 3rd Masterpiece	Won	
2006	Golden Disc Awards	Grand Prize (Daesang)	The 3rd Masterpiece	Nominated	
2006	SBS Gayo Daejeon	Main Prize (Bonsang)	The 3rd Masterpiece	Won	
2006	Mnet KM Music Festival	Album of the Year (Daesang)	The 3rd Masterpiece	Won	
2006	Mnet KM Music Festival	Song of the Year (Daesang)	"Partner for Life"	Won	
2006	Mnet KM Music Festival	Best R&B Performance	"Partner for Life"	Nominated	
2006	Mnet KM Music Festival	Digital Popularity Award	"Partner for Life"	Won	
2006	Golden Disc Awards	Digital Daesang	"Partner for Life"	Won	

Music program awards for "Partner for Life"
Program	Date
Show! Music Tank	April 22, 2006
Show! Music Tank	May 13, 2006
Inkigayo	April 30, 2006
Inkigayo	May 7, 2006
Inkigayo	May 14, 2006
M Countdown	May 11, 2006
M Countdown	May 18, 2006

== Track listing ==
No.	Title	Lyrics	Music	Arrangements	Length
1.	"내사람" ("Partner For Life")	Ahn Young Min	Cho Young Soo	Cho Young Soo
2.	"느림보" ("Slowpoke")	Ahn Young Min	Ryu Jae Hyun	Ryu Jae Hyun
3.	"폭풍" ("Storm")	Ahn Young Min	Cho Young Soo	Cho Young Soo
4.	"사랑했어요" ("I Loved You", ft. Danny Ahn)	Ahn Young Min	Cho Young Soo	Cho Young Soo
5.	"Love Song"
6.	"비익조" ("Bird")	Cho Eun Hee	Shin Sung Mo	Shin Sung Mo, Ahn Ki Deok
7.	"Run"
8.	"내가 너를" ("How Could I To You")	Ryu Jae Hyun	Ryu Jae Hyun	Ryu Jae Hyun
9.	"욕심" ("Greed")	Ahn Young Min	Cho Young Soo	Cho Young Soo
10.	"Wedding"	Min Myung Ki	Min Myung Ki	Lee Seok Ju
11.	"선인장" ("Cactus")	Ahn Young Min	Ahn Young Min	Ahn Young Min
12.	"I'm Sorry"
13.	"웃다가 울다가" ("Laughing and Crying")	Han Sung Ho	Han Sung Ho	Han Sung Hoon
14.	"Untouchable" (with M2M & Kim Jong-kook)	Ahn Young Min	Cho Young Soo	Cho Young Soo
15.	"바람과 함께 사라지다" ("Gone With The Wind", with Kim Jong-kook)	Ryu Jae Hyun	Ryu Jae Hyun	Ryu Jae Hyun

== Charts and sales ==
=== Monthly charts ===
Chart (2006)	Peak position
South Korean Albums (RIAK)	1

=== Yearly charts ===
Chart (2006)	Position
South Korean Albums (RIAK)	2

=== Sales ===
Region	Sales
South Korea (RIAK)	311,642
