= Saldaga =

Album by SG Wannabe

Studio album by SG Wannabe
- Released: March 23, 2005
- Recorded: 2004–2005
- Genre: R&B; ballad
- Language: Korean
- Label: Mnet Media
- Producer: Cho Young-chul; Lee Min-soo

SG Wannabe chronology
SG Wanna Be+ (2004)	Saldaga (2005)	Classic Odyssey (2005)

Special edition cover
- Music 2.0 special edition cover

Singles from SG Wannabe
- 1. "Sin and Punishment" Released: March 23, 2005; 2. "Saldaga" Released: March 23, 2005

Saldaga (also known as As We Live or While You Live) is the second studio album by South Korean vocal group SG Wannabe, released through Mnet Media on March 23, 2005. The record spawned two number one singles: "Sin and Punishment", which received numerous awards both for the music video and for the song itself, and "Saldaga". Like its predecessor, "Saldaga" was able to attract media attention for the group's vocal ability, thus SG Wannabe became the only artist in 2005 to sell more than 400,000 copies of their album. The album has sold 485,926 copies.

Saldaga was awarded the Album Daesang prize at the 2005 Golden Disc Awards.

== Background ==
In 2004, SG Wannabe released their debut album, SG Wanna Be +. The album sold 210,000 copies and won the group three Best New Artist awards at ceremonies such as the Seoul Music Awards and Golden Disc Awards. SG Wannabe's follow-up album was set to release on January 19, 2005, but was delayed due to busy schedules. In February of that year, news outlets reported that Han Eun-jung and Jang Shin-young would appear in the music video for "Sin and Punishment", directed by Cha Eun-taek, from SG Wannabe's upcoming album. The group first performed the song on March 5, during a special concert promoting the drama Sad Love Story.

== Songs ==
"Sin and Punishment" was SG Wannabe's title track for this album. It is a mid-tempo song. "Sin and Punishment" was one of the most popular songs of 2005. "Saldaga" (also known as "As We Live" or "While You Live") was the follow-up track. A two-part drama music video was released for "Sin and Punishment" and "Saldaga". The music videos starred Ha Seok-jin, Seo Jun-young, and Han Eun-jung. "Craze" was an upbeat tracked that was loved by many fans, and a remix version was released as a music video which featured Han Eun-jung and Hwang Jung-eum.

== Reception ==
Saldaga was met with commercial success in South Korea upon its release. It peaked at number one on the monthly album chart compiled by the Music Industry Association of Korea (MIAK) in April 2005, opening with sales of 129,801 copies. It sold 93,162 copies the following month and remained at number one in May. On April 28, 2005, it was reported that the album had garnered revenue of ₩4 billion. The amount soon rose to almost ₩10 billion (US$9 million), with revenue from digital download sales alone accounting for ₩4.3 billion.

Saldaga was the best-selling album in South Korea during 2005, selling 414,855 copies. Sina Entertainment named it one of the Top 10 Asian Albums of the year, alongside records such as BoA's Best of Soul, Ayumi Hamasaki's My Story, Koda Kumi's Best: First Things, TVXQ's Rising Sun and Mika Nakashima's Music.

=== Accolades ===
Awards and nominations
Year	Organization	Award	Nominee	Result	Ref.
2005	Golden Disc Awards	Main Prize (Bonsang)	Saldaga	Won	
2005	Golden Disc Awards	Grand Prize (Daesang)	Saldaga	Won	
2005	SBS Gayo Daejeon	Main Prize (Bonsang)	Saldaga	Won	
2005	KBS Gayo Daesang	Best Music Video	"Sin and Punishment"	Won	
2005	Mnet KM Music Video Festival	Best Male Group	"Sin and Punishment"	Won	
2005	Mnet KM Music Video Festival	Best Ballad Performance	"Saldaga"	Nominated	

Music program awards for "Sin and Punishment"
Program	Date
M Countdown	April 28, 2005
Inkigayo	May 15, 2005
Inkigayo	May 22, 2005

== Legacy ==
A special edition of the album was released on June 13, 2005, attracting rare praise from former UN Secretary-General Ban Ki-moon. In January 2014, Star News named Saldaga the second-most successful digital album in released South Korea since 2004, tied with Big Bang's Stand Up (2008) and 2NE1's 2NE1 1st Mini Album (2009).

== Track listing ==
No.	Title	Lyrics	Music	Arrangements	Length
1.	"죄(罪)와벌(罰)" ("Sin and Punishment")	Nam Min Seol	Kim Do-hoon	Kim Do-hoon
2.	"이별의 계절" ("Season of Separation")	Ahn Young Min	Lee Kyung-sub	Lee Kyung-sub
3.	"광(狂)" ("Craze")	Ahn Young Min	Cho Young Soo	Cho Young Soo
4.	"가" ("Go")	Lee Hui Seung	Han Sung Ho	Han Sung Ho
5.	"그래도" ("Even Though")	Kim Jin Ho	Cho Young Soo	Cho Young Soo
6.	"살다가" ("Saldaga"/"As We Live")	Ryu Jae Hyun	Ryu Jae Hyun	Ryu Jae Hyun
7.	"24 Hours"	Ahn Young Min	Cho Young Soo	Cho Young Soo, Mordny
8.	"Thank You"	Min Myung Ki	Min Myung Ki	Lee Seok Ju, Jung Byung Kyu
9.	"입술만 깨물고 있죠" ("I'm Biting my Lips")	Min Myung Ki	Min Myung Ki	Jung Byung Kyu
10.	"Tenderness"	Ahn Young Min	Lee Kyung-sub	Lee Kyung-sub
11.	"내 하루를" ("My One Day")	Han Sung Ho	Han Sung Ho	K
12.	"보관함" ("Locker")	Kim Jin Ho	Han Sung Won	Han Sung Won
13.	"하루" ("A Day")	Ahn Young Min	Lee Hyun Seung	Lee Hyun Seung

=== Special Edition ===
==== CD 1 ====
No.	Title	Lyrics	Music	Arrangements	Length
1.	"죄(罪)와벌(罰)" ("Sin and Punishment")	Nam Min Seol	Kim Do-hoon	Kim Do-hoon
2.	"이별의 계절" ("Season of Separation")	Ahn Young Min	Lee Kyung-sub	Lee Kyung-sub
3.	"광(狂)" ("Craze")	Ahn Young Min	Cho Young Soo	Cho Young Soo
4.	"가" ("Go")	Lee Hui Seung	Han Sung Ho	Han Sung Ho
5.	"그래도" ("Even Though")	Kim Jin Ho	Cho Young Soo	Cho Young Soo
6.	"살다가" ("Saldaga"/"As We Live")	Ryu Jae Hyun	Ryu Jae Hyun	Ryu Jae Hyun
7.	"24 Hours"	Ahn Young Min	Cho Young Soo	Cho Young Soo, Mordny
8.	"Thank You"	Min Myung Ki	Min Myung Ki	Lee Seok Ju, Jung Byung Kyu
9.	"입술만 깨물고 있죠" ("I'm Biting my Lips")	Min Myung Ki	Min Myung Ki	Jung Byung Kyu
10.	"Tenderness"	Ahn Young Min	Lee Kyung-sub	Lee Kyung-sub
11.	"내 하루를" ("My One Day")	Han Sung Ho	Han Sung Ho	K
12.	"보관함" ("Locker")	Kim Jin Ho	Han Sung Won	Han Sung Won
13.	"하루" ("A Day")	Ahn Young Min	Lee Hyun Seung	Lee Hyun Seung

==== CD 2 ====
No.	Title	Lyrics	Music	Arrangements	Length
1.	"죄(罪)와벌(罰)" ("Sin and Punishment")	Nam Min Seol	Kim Do-hoon	Kim Do-hoon
2.	"이별의 계절" ("Season of Separation")	Ahn Young Min	Cho Young Soo	Cho Young Soo
3.	"광(狂)" ("Craze")	Ahn Young Min	Cho Young Soo	Cho Young Soo
4.	"그래도" ("Even Though")	Kim Jin Ho	Cho Young Soo	Cho Young Soo
5.	"살다가" ("Saldaga"/"As We Live")	Ryu Jae Hyun	Ryu Jae Hyun	Ryu Jae Hyun
6.	"Tenderness"	Ahn Young Min	Lee Kyung-sub	Lee Kyung-sub
7.	"죄(罪)와벌(罰) (Electronica Version)" ("Sin and Punishment")	Nam Min Seol	Kim Do-hoon	Kim Do-hoon
8.	"살다가 (R&B Version)" ("Saldaga"/"As We Live")	Nam Min Seol	Kim Do-hoon	Kim Do-hoon
9.	"광(狂) (Electronica Version)" ("Craze")	Ahn Young Min	Cho Young Soo	Cho Young Soo

== Charts ==
=== Monthly charts ===
Chart (2005)	Peak position
South Korean Albums (RIAK)	1

=== Yearly charts ===
Chart (2005)	Position
South Korean Albums (RIAK)	1

== Sales ==
Sales figures for Saldaga
Region	Certification	Certified units/sales
South Korea	—	435,000
