= Gift from SG Wannabe =

Gift From SG Wannabe

Studio album by SG Wannabe
- Released: April 16, 2009
- Genre: K-pop
- Language: Korean
- Label: Mnet Media
- Producer: Cho Young-chul, Lee Min-soo

SG Wannabe chronology
My Friend (2008)	Gift From SG Wannabe (2009)	SG Wannabe by SG Wannabe 7 Part.I (2010)

Singles from SG Wannabe
- 1. "I Love You" Released: April 16, 2009; 2. "Cry Baby" Released: April 16, 2009

Gift from SG Wannabe is the sixth Korean studio album by SG Wannabe. The album has so far sold 100,500 copies.

== Music videos ==
One music video was produced for "I Love You" and "Cry Baby".

== Notable tracks ==
=== "I Love You" ===
"I Love You" was the title song for this album. Yurisangja's Park Seung-hwa participated in the chorus of "I Love You".

=== "Cry Baby" ===
"Cry Baby" was the follow-up song.

== Track listing ==
No.	Title	Lyrics	Music	Arrangements	Length
1.	"사랑해" ("I Love You", ft. Park Seung-hwa from Yurisangja)	Ahn Young Min	Cho Young Soo	Cho Young Soo
2.	"주르륵" ("Trickling")
3.	"내사랑 울보" ("Cry Baby")	Yoon Sa Ra	Cho Young Soo
4.	"용의 눈물" ("A Dragon's Tear")	Ahn Young Min	Ahn Young Min	Seo Jae Ha
5.	"그 사람이 부러워" ("I Envy Those People", ft. MJ)
6.	"내사랑 내곁에" ("My Love With Me")
7.	"...좋겠다" ("...I Hope")
8.	"사랑의 유효기간은 없어" ("Love is Not Valid")	Ahn Young Min	Ahn Young Min	Ahn Young Min
9.	"거꾸로 가는 사랑" ("Receding Love")
10.	"겁쟁이" ("Coward")	Ahn Young Min	Ahn Young Min	Ahn Young Min
11.	"거짓말마" ("Liar")
