= Our Days (EP) =

EP by SG Wannabe
- Released: November 19, 2016
- Length: 21:09
- Label: CJ E&M Music; B2M Entertainment
- Producer: Cho Youngsoo; Lee Seokhoon; Kim Jinho; Kim Yongjoon; Brian U; Joseph K

SG Wannabe chronology
The Voice (2015)	Our Days (2016)

Singles from The Voice
- 1. "I'm Missing You" Released: November 19, 2016

Music video
- "I'm Missing You" on YouTube

Our Days is the fourth extended play by South Korean group SG Wannabe. It was released on November 19, 2016, by CJ E&M Music and B2M Entertainment. The EP consists of five songs, being "I'm Missing You" the title track. A music video for the title track was also released on November 19.

The EP was a moderate success peaking at number 17 on the Gaon Album Chart. It has sold 3,553 physical copies as of November 2016.

== Release ==
The EP was released on November 19, 2016, through several music portals, including MelOn, and iTunes, for the global market.

== Promotion ==
=== Single ===
"I'm Missing You" was released as the title track in conjunction with the EP on November 19, 2016. The song entered at number 66 on the Gaon Digital Chart on the chart issue dated November 13–19, 2016, with 27,943 downloads sold. In its second week, the song peaked at number 30, with 44,797 downloads sold and 1,169,683 streams. The song entered at number 90 on the chart for the month of November 2016, with 80,034 downloads sold. A music video for the song was also released on November 19.

== Commercial performance ==
Our Days entered and peaked at number 17 on the Gaon Album Chart on the chart issue dated November 13–19, 2016. In its second week, the EP fell to number 26 and climbed to 25 the following week, before dropping the chart.

The EP entered at number 38 on the chart for the month of November 2016, with 3,553 physical copies sold.

== Track listing ==
Digital download

No.	Title	Lyrics	Music	Arrangement	Length
1.	"I'm Missing You" (아임미싱유; aimmising-yu)	SG Wannabe	Cho Youngsoo	Lee Yoojin	4:08
2.	"After You're Gone" (나를 떠나요; naleul tteonayo)	Lee Seokhoon	Lee Seokhoon	Captain Planet	4:17
3.	"Memory Lane" (습관처럼; seubgwancheoleom)	SG Wannabe	Lee Seokhoon; Kim Jinho	Lee Seokhoon; Captain Planet	4:05
4.	"Dream of You" (너를 그리다; neoleul geulida)	Kim Yongjoon	Kim Yongjoon; Brian U; Joseph K.	Kim Yongjoon; Brian U; Joseph K.	3:52
5.	"Father" (탄생; tansaeng)	Kim Jinho	Lee Seokhoon; Kim Jinho	Lee Seokhoon; Captain Planet	3:47
Total length:					21:09

== Charts ==
Chart (2016)	Peak position
South Korea (Gaon Weekly Album Chart)	17
South Korea (Gaon Monthly Album Chart)	38

== Release history ==
Region	Date	Format	Label
South Korea	November 19, 2016	CD, Digital download	CJ E&M Music, B2M Entertainment
Worldwide	November 19, 2016	Digital downloads	CJ E&M Music, B2M Entertainment
