= The Voice (SG Wannabe EP) =

EP by SG Wannabe
- Released: August 19, 2015
- Length: 20:44
- Label: CJ E&M Music; B2M Entertainment
- Producer: Cho Yeongsu; Lee Seokhoon; Park Deoksan; Kim Dohoon (RBW); Lee Sangho; Kim Yongjun; Brian U; Kim Jinho

SG Wannabe chronology
SG Wannabe 7, Pt. 2 (2011)	The Voice (2015)	Our Days (2016)

Singles from The Voice
- 1. "Love You" Released: August 19, 2015; 2. "Good Memory" Released: August 19, 2015

The Voice is the third extended play by South Korean group SG Wannabe. It was released on August 19, 2015, by CJ E&M Music and B2M Entertainment.

The EP was a commercial success peaking at number 5 on the Gaon Album Chart. The EP sold 10,463 physical copies as of October 2015.

== Release ==
The EP was released on August 19, 2015, through several music portals, including Melon, and iTunes, for the global market.

== Commercial performance ==
The Voice entered and peaked at number 5 on the Gaon Album Chart on the chart issue dated August 16-22, 2015. In its second week, the EP fell to number 13 and in its third week to number 23. In its fourth week, the EP placed at number 45, climbed to number 39 the following week and to number 31 in its sixth week. The EP climbed to number 22 in its eleventh week, before dropping the chart the following week.

The EP placed at number 14 on the chart for the month of August 2015, with 7,723 physical copies sold. It also charted at number 42 in September with 1,283 copies and at number 46 in October with 1,457 copies. The EP sold over 10,000 copies in 2015.

== Track listing ==
Digital download

No.	Title	Lyrics	Music	Arrangement	Length
1.	"Love You" (가슴 뛰도록; gaseum ttwidolog; lit. So That My Heart Beats)	Kang Eunkyung	Cho Yeongsu	Cho Yeongsu	4:11
2.	"Those Days" (그때; geuttae)	Lee Seokhoon	Lee Seokhoon; Park Deoksang	Lee Yoojin	4:41
3.	"Good Memory" (좋은 기억; joh-eun gieog)	Kang Eunkyung	Kim Dohoon (RBW); Lee Sangho	Lee Sangho	3:33
4.	"Twenty" (스물; seumul)	Kim Yongjun	Kim Yongjun; Brian U	KingMing	3:59
5.	"You Are Mine"	Kim Jinho	Kim Jinho	Kim Jinho; Anthony; Seung Bumlim	4:20
Total length:					20:44

== Charts ==
Chart (2015)	Peak position
South Korea (Gaon Weekly Album Chart)	5
South Korea (Gaon Monthly Album Chart)	14

== Release history ==
Region	Date	Format	Label
South Korea	August 19, 2015	CD, Digital download	CJ E&M Music, B2M Entertainment
Worldwide	August 19, 2015	Digital download	CJ E&M Music, B2M Entertainment
