= My Friend (SG Wannabe album) =

Studio album by SG Wannabe
- Released: April 24, 2008
- Genre: K-pop
- Language: Korean
- Label: Mnet Media
- Producer: Cho Young-chul, Lee Min-soo

SG Wannabe chronology
Story In New York (2007)	My Friend (2008)	Gift From SG Wannabe (2008)

Singles from SG Wannabe
- 1. "I Miss You" Released: April 3, 2008; 2. "Lalala" Released: April 24, 2008; 3. "Smooth Break Up" Released: April 24, 2008

My Friend is the fifth Korean studio album by SG Wannabe. As of April 23, 2008, SG Wannabe's fifth album had 85,000 pre-orders and counting. The album was slated to be released on April 24 with fourteen new tracks, including a Japanese version of "I Miss You" ("보고싶어").

SG Wannabe's new member, Lee Seok-hoon, also made his debut performance on April 24 on Mnet's M Countdown, singing the first track, "Lalala", on the new album.

== Music videos ==
Two version of music video were released for "Lalala". The first version featured former Jewelry member, Cho Min Ah, Yoo In-young, and Seo Jun-young. Part 2 of the music video featured music by M to M's third album. The second version of the music video featured the SG Wannabe members.

The music video for "Smooth Break Up" featured SG Wannabe, T-ara's Hyomin and Qri, and Spica's Jiwon.

The music video for "I Miss You" was for Yeon Ga 2008, which featured Song Seung-heon, Park Yong-ha, Ha Seok-jin and more.

== Notable tracks ==
=== "Lalala" ===
"Lalala" was SG Wannabe's title track for this album. Instead of a ballad track, "Lalala" had country-style tempo and was enjoyed by many fans.

=== "Smooth Break Up" ===
"Smooth Break Up" was SG Wannabe's follow-up track. "Smooth Break Up" is a medium-tempo song combined with a Latin beat.

=== "I Miss You" ===
"I Miss You" was also a track for Yeon Ga 2008. "I Miss You" is a touching ballad song. Both versions of "I Miss You" ("보고싶어") were recorded with their former member Chae Dong Ha. The Korean one was recorded with 4 people and the Japanese version was recorded by the original members.

== Track listing ==
No.	Title	Lyrics	Music	Arrangements	Length
1.	"라라라" ("Lalala")	Ahn Young Min	Cho Young Soo	Cho Young Soo	4:34
2.	"멋지게 이별" ("Smooth Break Up")	Ahn Young Min	Cho Young Soo	Cho Young Soo	3:56
3.	"사랑하니까" ("Because of Love")	Kim Do Hoon, Choi Gab Won	Kim Do Hoon	Kim Do Hoon	4:13
4.	"보고싶어" ("I Miss You")	Ahn Young Min	Cho Young Soo	Cho Young Soo	3:53
5.	"그녀의 소식" ("About Her")	Ahn Young Min	Seo Jae Ha	Seo Jae Ha	3:37
6.	"멜로디" ("Melody")	Min Myung Ki	Min Myung Ki	Park Dong Kyu	4:13
7.	"Kiss"	Ahn Young Min	Ahn Young Min	Kim Tae Hyun	3:12
8.	"여보세요" ("Hello")	Park Duk Sang	Ahn Young Min	Park Duk Sang	3:49
9.	"How to Love" (ft. Mario)	Kim Do Hoon, Lee Sang Ho	Hwang Sung Jin	Lee Sang Ho	4:19
10.	"연락해요" ("Keep in Touch")	Ahn Young Min	Cho Young Soo	Cho Young Soo	3:39
11.	"Happy!"	Ahn Young Min	Ahn Young Min	Seo Jae Ha	4:02
12.	"죄와벌 Part.II" ("Sin and Punishment Part.II")	Ahn Young Min	Cho Young Soo	Kim Tae Hyun	3:37
13.	"이토록 아름다운" ("As Wonderful As This")	Kim Jin Ho	Min Myung Ki	Park Dong Kyu, Song Dae Gi	4:35
14.	"あいたい (아이타이)" ("I Miss You" Japanese Version)	Aki Arai	Cho Young Soo	Cho Young Soo	4:16
