= SG Wannabe =

South Korean vocal group

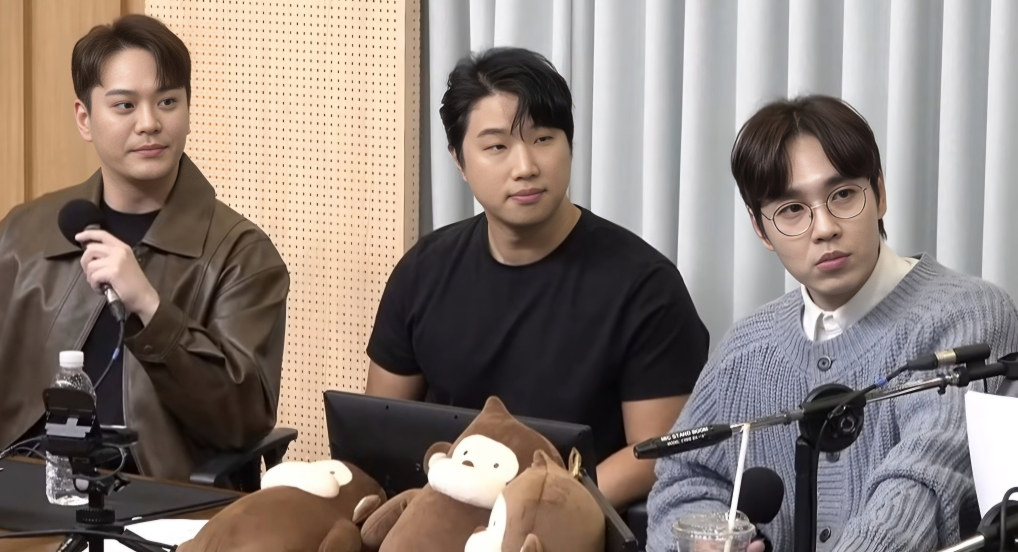
- SG Wannabe in March 2024; From left to right: Kim Yong-jun, Kim Jin-ho and Lee Seok-hoon

Background information
- Origin: Seoul, South Korea
- Genres: Kpop; R&B; ballad
- Years active: 2004–2011; 2015–present
- Labels: Mnet Media (2004–2009); IS Entermedia Group (2009–2011); Stone Music Entertainment (2015–present); Pony Canyon
- Members: Kim Yong-jun; Kim Jin-ho; Lee Seok-hoon
- Past members: Chae Dong-ha
- Website: Official Japanese website

SG Wannabe (Korean: SG 워너비) is a South Korean vocal group consisting of members Kim Yong-jun, Kim Jin-ho and Lee Seok-hoon. The group debuted in January 2004 with the single, "Timeless", from the album SG Wanna Be+, and won Best New Artist at the Golden Disc Awards, Seoul Music Awards, and SBS Gayo Daejeon. The group's second album, Saldaga, was the best-selling album of 2005 in South Korea and won Album of the Year at the Golden Disc Awards. Their next two albums, The 3rd Masterpiece (2006) and The Sentimental Chord (2007) were also commercial and critical successes.

In 2008, original member Chae Dong-ha left the group, and Lee Seok-hoon joined as a new member. The group released the albums My Friend (2008), Gift from SG Wannabe (2009), SG Wannabe by SG Wannabe 7 Part.I (2010) and SG Wannabe by SG Wannabe 7 Part.II (2011) before going on hiatus while the members served their mandatory military service and focused on their solo careers.

In 2015, the group released their first album in four years with the extended play The Voice, which they followed in 2016 with Our Days.

The name SG Wannabe was chosen to reflect the group’s desire to become like Simon & Garfunkel.

== History ==
=== 2004–2005: Debut with SG Wannabe+ and second album Saldaga ===
SG Wannabe debuted in 2004 with their first album, SG Wanna Be+. It was produced by Lee Kyung-sub and Park Keun-tae and famous music producers in Korea. The title track's music video for the album attracted media attention, as it featured top actors such as Sul Kyung-gu and Kim Nam-jin, and actresses Yunjin Kim, Kang Hye-jung, and Seo Sung-min. The production costs were reportedly about 2 billion won. The group gained a reputation for being quite mysterious because they did not show their faces and did not star in any of their music videos. Nevertheless, their vocal abilities attracted a wide demographic of fans, and the album was an instant hit with pre-sales of 90,000 copies. Later in 2004, the group was recognized for their vocal ability with numerous awards, including nominations for Best Newcomer at the Golden Disc Awards and the Seoul Popular Music Awards.

On March 29, 2005, SG Wannabe released their second album. It included the two #1 hits "Sin & Punishment (죄와벌)", which received numerous awards both for the music video and for the song itself, and "살다가 (While You Live)". Like its predecessor, "Saldaga" was able to attract media attention for the group's vocal ability, thus SG Wannabe became the only artist in 2005 to sell more than 400,000 copies of their album. On September 14, 2005, the group released the "Classic Odyssey", their 2.5 album. 1 billion Won (₩1,000,000,000) budget went into SG Wannabe's new remake album. It included hits such as "My Heart's Treasure Box" (내 마음의 보석상자). To top off the success of their 2nd album, SG Wannabe was awarded the prestigious Daesang (the "Artist Of The Year") from the Golden Disc award. When 2005 was over, SG Wannabe were ranked at #1, with over 400,000 copies sold of their 2nd album, and 12th, with 147,047 copies sold of their remake album on the year-end chart. Their songs also became popular with noraebang goers and topped the noraebang chart compiled by company TJ Media based on the number of times specific songs were selected.

=== 2006–2007: The 3rd Masterpiece, The Sentimental Chord and Chae Dong-ha's departure ===
On April 11, 2006, the trio released their third album, called The 3rd Masterpiece. Just like what they did in the second album (the music video had two parts; the first part was with the song "Crime and Punishment" (죄와벌), while the second part was with the song "As We Live" (살다가)), their third album also contained two-part music videos. The first part was with their new title song, "Partner for Life" (내 사람) starring Shinhwa's Kim Dong-wan and also featuring Jeong So-Young, and the second part was released with "Slowpoke" (느림보). Once again, the album manage to chart high, reaching #1 on numerous charts.

On November 18, 2006, they released a greatest hits compilation entitled SG Wannabe Best Album - The Precious History. It was a collection of their favorite songs from the past three albums and also included three new songs. They also released a music video for those songs which was called "Song of Love" (사랑가), "Even If I Could See You (그저 바라볼 수만 있어도)", and "Ordinary People" featuring Hoo Ni-Hoon, Min Kyung-Hoon, Jang Hye-Jin. However, despite having high sales and topping the charts, they did not win another, though the group was nominated for the Grand Prize (Daesang).

In January 2007, the group took part in the Hallyu Festival in Osaka which also featured Jun Jin and Lee Min-woo of Shinhwa, Kangta of H.O.T and actor Song Seung-heon at the Osaka Dome.

Their highly anticipated 4th album, The Sentimental Chord, was released on April 6, 2007, almost a year after their 3rd album. Again, they amazed the audience with their new title song "Arirang" (아리랑), which had Korean traditional instruments playing as the background music. With the release of their 4th album and their title song, they went as the #1 in the Bugs Chart as well as the Korea monthly chart. The album was also number one on the "Top 20 Album Sales (May 2007)" with 44,618 copies sold in May and 125,450 sold altogether. They also released two special albums, "SG Wanna Be+" and "Story In New York." Both the special album manage to be successful as well, continuing SG Wannabe's popularity and success. Towards the end of the year, SG Wannabe was awarded their second daesang from the Golden Disk Awards, reigning as the top artist of the year. Selling almost 200,000 copies, The Sentimental Chord was the best-selling album of 2007 in Korea. In addition, several changes also occurred within the band, with member Chae Dong-ha leaving the group in order to focus on a solo career.

=== 2008–2014: My Friend, Gift from SG Wannabe and hiatus ===
As of April 23, 2008, SG Wannabe's fifth album had 85,000 pre-orders and counting; it was released with a Japanese version of "I Miss You" (보고싶어). Both versions of that song were recorded with their former member Chae Dong-ha, and new member Lee Seok-hoon made his debut performance on April 24 on M Countdown, having been selected through an audition and officially revealed in the news as the new member in late March. Lee recorded the rest of the tracks in the new album, including the promoted track, "Lalala". In 2009, SG Wannabe released Gift From SG Wannabe. They also released the song "운명을 거슬러" ("Fate Reverse", also translated as "Against Destiny"), featuring Kim Jong-wook, which was the soundtrack for the critically-acclaimed MBC drama East of Eden.

Chae committed suicide on May 27, 2011, having battled depression since his SG Wannabe days. After the loss of their friend and former member, coupled by Kim Yong-jun's involvement in a hit-and-run incident and his and Lee's impending enlistment, the members decided to temporarily stop promoting as a group and focused on their solo careers. Kim Yong-jun enlisted in February 2012, followed by Lee in January 2013. Kim Jin-ho continued to release music and occasionally perform on music variety programs but largely shied away from the public eye.

=== 2015–2018: Return from hiatus ===
In January 2015, SG Wannabe signed a new group contract with CJ E&M, having chosen not to extend their group contract with the previous management, and announced the end of their 4-year hiatus. Several months later, in August, they announced the release of a new album. On August 19, 2015, The Voice was released. The EP peaked at number 5 on the Gaon Album Chart and sold over 10,000 physical copies. Songs from the album dominated major online music sites such as Melon, Bugs and Naver Music for the entire week. TenAsia commented in a positive review that the trio had returned with a more mature sound compared to pre-hiatus.

On March 31, 2016, SG Wannabe participated in the OST of the drama Descendants of the Sun, starring Song Joong-ki and Song Hye-kyo. The song is titled "Let's Love" and it is the theme song of the drama's second couple, played by Jin Goo and Kim Ji-won.

On November 19, 2016, the group released another EP, entitled Our Days. The EP peaked at number 17 on the Gaon Album Chart and sold over 3,500 physical copies in its first month.

The group took a break during 2017 as Lee focused on his solo activities. In late August 2018 they announced plans for a reunion and returned with the single "Let's Meet Up Now" (만나자), which was released on September 6. Instead of promoting on music shows, they only appeared on You Hee-yeol's Sketchbook and performed live in four different open-air venues around Seoul from noon until 10pm on September 7.

=== 2021–present: Hangout with Yoo and new single ===
On March 27, 2021, the group appeared on Hangout with Yoo, marking the first time that the members had a live performance together as SG Wannabe since 2018. In the episode aired on April 17, the trio performed four of their most notable hit songs on the show. The songs that were performed live on the show gained surges in popularity and rose to the top of real-time domestic online music charts and charted in the Billboard K-pop Hot 100. The videos of their performance were uploaded on YouTube and garnered several million views within days. The group became a trending topic on YouTube and social media within South Korea and videos of their past performances, both as a group and as solo artists, began garnering more views. In the Korean Business Research Institute's monthly "Brand Reputation" rankings, SG Wannabe placed 5th for the month of April despite being out of the spotlight for several years and the members mostly concentrating on solo activities prior to their appearance on Hangout with Yoo. In May several of the songs performed on Hangout with Yoo climbed the rankings on Inkigayo and Music Bank. In the following months, the songs performed on Hangout with Yoo continued to stay in the online and noraebang charts. The group's "second heyday" has been attributed to a domestic "retro" wave that has been going on for the past several years, as interest and awareness of older songs among the internet-savvy younger generation increased due to social media and online sharing platforms.

On May 5, the group's former management MBK Entertainment, through their subsidiary PocketDol Studio, announced that it would release some of the recordings of their 2006 nationwide tour as a repackaged DVD entitled Do You Remember?. All three members, although now with different managements, immediately responded with a joint statement that none of them had been consulted on the matter, leading to accusations that MBK Entertainment was trying to profit from the group's renewed popularity.

On July 16, the group released the single "You're The Best of Me" (넌 좋은 사람), which is their first new release after three years. Despite minimal promotion, the single remained in the Gaon Digital Chart for nine weeks.

== Members ==
=== Current ===
- Lee Seok-hoon (Hangul: 이석훈) (2008–2011, 2015–present)
- Kim Yong-jun (Hangul: 김용준) (2004–2011, 2015–present)
- Kim Jin-ho (Hangul: 김진호) (2004–2011, 2015–present)

=== Former ===
- Chae Dong-ha (Hangul: 채동하) (2004–2008; died 2011)

== Artistry ==
From the beginning, SG Wannabe was known for being a group focused on lyrical content and singing ability rather than following the kkonminam trend that was popular at that time. Kim Yong-jun and Kim Jin-ho later revealed in SG Wannabe's 2021 appearance on You Quiz on the Block that they were initially meant to debut as "faceless singers", an industry colloquialism for singers who are skilled vocalists and would release music but refrain from appearing on television as they do not meet South Korean societal standards for physical attractiveness. The subject matter of their early albums were largely heavy, with the power ballad "As We Live" (살다가) being a notable example. Initially known as a R&B group, after Lee's addition in 2008, they began diversifying and later releases incorporated elements from different genres ranging from electropop to trot; for example, the instrumental accompaniment to "Arirang" features Korean traditional instruments and "La La La" is in a distinctly country style. While the songs may differ in stylistic arrangement and genre, a key characteristic is the medium-speed tempo and distinct rhythm. They have been credited by domestic pop culture and industry commentators with popularizing the medium-tempo ballad centered on an emotional climatic refrain, which became a trend during the mid-2000s.

An idol group that dominates the stage with performance. A boy group that captures women's hearts with visuals. A girl group that attracts attention with their slim physiques and revealing clothing. There are singers who don't fall into these categories. The only weapon is their voice.

Early in their career, they drew comparisons to Vibe for their focus on the R&B genre. They also gained notice from industry veterans and commentators for their more mature vocal styles despite being only in their twenties: Chae's deep husky voice complemented Kim Jin-ho's higher-register belting style and Kim Yong-jun's clear tenor voice. When Lee joined the group, he provided an equally powerful singing style, albeit in the baritone range. Unlike many groups which debuted around the same time, there was no strict distinction between their lead and sub-vocals; instead whenever one member sang his line, the other two would harmonize or provide backing vocals.

Within the industry, SG Wannabe have also gained a reputation as highly consistent live performers, with critics noting that their live voices sound nearly identical to that in their albums. After several controversies involving notable idol groups and artists lip syncing their performances, especially during the high-profile 2006 Mnet Km Music Festival, SG Wannabe themselves came under scrutiny for a period of time. In November 2010, the group were guests on Park Kyung-lim's radio show and, after they had performed a song, listeners wrote on the program's live message board, questioning whether their performance was pre-recorded since it sounded almost exactly like the CD. In response, the members agreed to add a narration and additional harmonies while performing "Winter Tree" (겨울 나무) to prove that they were indeed performing live. Kim Yong-jun unexpectedly coughed towards the end of his part and the other two members began laughing while singing their respective parts. The incident was dubbed "Coughing Tree" by netizens and the video of the studio feed went viral on the internet and social media, dispelling doubts about their live singing abilities.

== Discography ==
Albums

- SG Wanna Be+ (2004)
- Saldaga (2005)
- The 3rd Masterpiece (2006)
- The Sentimental Chord (2007)
- My Friend (2008)
- Rainbow (2009)
- Gift From SG Wannabe (2009)
- SG Wannabe by SG Wannabe 7 Part.I (2010)
- SG Wannabe by SG Wannabe 7 Part.II (2011)

== Concert ==
- SG Wannabe Concert: Our Song (2023)

== Awards and nominations ==
Award	Year	Category	Nominated work	Result	Ref.
Brand of the Year Awards	2021	Vocal Group	SG Wannabe	Won	
Golden Disc Awards	2004	Best New Artist	SG Wanna Be+	Won	
Golden Disc Awards	2004	Best Music Video	"Timeless"	Won	
Golden Disc Awards	2005	Album Daesang	Saldaga	Won	
Golden Disc Awards	2005	Album Bonsang	Saldaga	Won	
Golden Disc Awards	2006	Digital Daesang	"Partner for Life"	Won	
Golden Disc Awards	2006	Digital Bonsang	"Partner for Life"	Won	
Golden Disc Awards	2006	Album Daesang	The 3rd Masterpiece	Nominated	
Golden Disc Awards	2006	Album Bonsang	The 3rd Masterpiece	Won	
Golden Disc Awards	2007	Album Daesang	The Sentimental Chord	Won	
Golden Disc Awards	2007	Album Bonsang	The Sentimental Chord	Won	
Golden Disc Awards	2008	Album Daesang	My Friend	Nominated	
Golden Disc Awards	2008	Album Bonsang	My Friend	Won	
Golden Disc Awards	2009	Album Daesang	Gift from SG Wannabe	Nominated	
Golden Disc Awards	2009	Album Bonsang	Gift from SG Wannabe	Won	
KBS Gayo Daesang	2005	Best Music Video	"Sin and Punishment"	Won	
KBS Gayo Daesang	2005	Singer of the Year (Bonsang)	SG Wannabe	Won	
Korea Broadcasting Awards	2009	Singer Award	SG Wannabe	Won	
Korean Entertainment Arts Awards	2005	Best Group	SG Wannabe	Won	
Korean Entertainment Arts Awards	2006	Best Male Ballad	SG Wannabe	Won	
MBC Gayo Daejejeon	2005	Top Ten Singers Award	SG Wannabe	Declined	
Mnet Asian Music Awards	2004	Best New Group Video	"Timeless"	Nominated	
Mnet Asian Music Awards	2004	Best R&B Video	"Timeless"	Nominated	
Mnet Asian Music Awards	2005	Best Male Group	"Sin and Punishment"	Won	
Mnet Asian Music Awards	2005	Best Ballad Performance	"Saldaga"	Nominated	
Mnet Asian Music Awards	2006	Album of the Year (Daesang)	The 3rd Masterpiece	Won	
Mnet Asian Music Awards	2006	Song of the Year (Daesang)	"Partner for Life"	Won	
Mnet Asian Music Awards	2006	Artist of the Year (Daesang)	SG Wannabe	Nominated	
Mnet Asian Music Awards	2006	Best R&B Performance	"Partner for Life"	Nominated	
Mnet Asian Music Awards	2006	Digital Popularity Award	"Partner for Life"	Won	
Mnet Asian Music Awards	2007	Album of the Year (Daesang)	The Sentimental Chord	Nominated	
Mnet Asian Music Awards	2007	Artist of the Year (Daesang)	SG Wannabe	Nominated	
Mnet Asian Music Awards	2007	Song of the Year (Daesang)	"Arirang"	Nominated	
Mnet Asian Music Awards	2007	Best Male Group	"Arirang"	Nominated	
Mnet Asian Music Awards	2007	Best R&B Performance	"Arirang"	Won	
Mnet Asian Music Awards	2008	Best Male Group	"Lalala"	Nominated	
Mnet Asian Music Awards	2008	Best OST	"Fate Reverse" (with Kim Jong-wook)	Won	
Mnet Asian Music Awards	2008	Judges' Choice Award	SG Wannabe	Won	
Mnet Asian Music Awards	2009	Best Male Group	"I Love You"	Nominated	
Mnet Asian Music Awards	2015	Best Male Vocal Performance	"Love You"	Nominated	
SBS Gayo Daejeon	2004	Best New Artist	SG Wannabe	Won	
SBS Gayo Daejeon	2005	Album Bonsang	Saldaga	Won	
SBS Gayo Daejeon	2005	Producer's Award	SG Wannabe	Won	
SBS Gayo Daejeon	2006	Album Bonsang	The 3rd Masterpiece	Won	
SBS Gayo Daejeon	2006	Producer's Award	SG Wannabe	Won	
Seoul Music Awards	2004	Best New Artist	SG Wannabe	Won	
Seoul Music Awards	2006	Album Bonsang	The 3rd Masterpiece	Won	
Seoul Music Awards	2008	Album Bonsang	The Sentimental Chord	Won	
Seoul Music Awards	2009	Album Bonsang	Gift from SG Wannabe	Won	
