= Kim Jong-wook =

South Korean singer (born 1982)

Kim Jong Wook
- Born: February 1, 1982 (age 44)
- Origin: South Korea
- Genres: K-Pop
- Occupation: Singer
- Years active: 2007-present

- Korean name
- Hangul: 김종욱
- RR: Gim Jonguk
- MR: Kim Chonguk

Kim Jong-wook (Korean: 김종욱; born February 1, 1982) is a South Korean singer. He is best known for Only You, the theme song of the popular Korean reality show We Got Married. Before leaving for the army, Kim Jong-wook released a song "Goodbye for Now" (Army Entrance Day), which was released on December 4, 2009. He has a bachelor's degree in industrial engineering from Konkuk University and graduated from the Kyung Hee University Graduate School of Communication.

== Discography ==
=== Albums ===
- Kim Jong Wook First, August 2007
- For a Long Time, February 28, 2008
- One Fine Day (Mini-album), May 22, 2009
- Goodbye For Now, December 4, 2009

=== Singles ===
- 가난한 사랑 (Poor Love), 2007
- 그대만이 (Only You), We Got Married OST, 2008
- 그대에게 바래요 (Way Back into Love) with Solbi, 2008
- 운명을 거슬러 (Going Against Fate) with SG Wannabe, East of Eden OST, 2009
- 척하면 척 (If You Pretend) with Kang Min-kyung of Davichi, 2009

== Awards ==
Year	Award-Giving Body	Category	Work	Result
2008	Mnet Asian Music Awards	Best OST	"Fate Reverse" (with SG Wannabe)	Won
