= History of science and technology in Korea =

Like most other regions in the world, science and technology in Korea has experienced periods of intense growth as well as long periods of stagnation.

== Prehistory ==
At the end of the Palaeolithic, people of the Korean Peninsula adopted microlithic stone tool technology, a highly efficient and useful way of making and maintaining a flexible prehistoric toolkit. The Palaeolithic also marks the beginning of a long period of plant and human interaction in which people undoubtedly adopted a number of wild plants for medicinal use.

Archaeological evidence from Gosan-ri in Jeju Island indicates that pottery was first made c. 8500–8000 BC. People depended on gathering, hunting, and fishing as the main source of food until the Middle Jeulmun Period (c. 3500 to 2000 BC) when small-scale cultivation of plants began.

The earliest known constellation patterns in Korea can be found on dolmens dating back to 3000 BC.

Farmers of the Mumun Period began to use multiple cropping systems of agriculture some time after 1500 BC. This advance in food production irrevocably altered the subsistence systems of the Mumun and hastened the beginnings of intensive agriculture in the Korean Peninsula. Korea and adjacent areas of East Asia seem to have been a part of the domestication region of soybean (Glycine max) between 1500 and 500 BC. Paddy-field agriculture, a system of wet-rice cultivation, was also introduced into the southern Korean Peninsula during this period.

Widespread archaeological evidence shows that after 850 BC the technology for heating homes changed. Before 850 BC pit-houses were heated using fire from various kinds of hearths that were dug into the floor of the pit-house. After 850 BC, hearths disappeared from the interior of pit-house architecture and was likely replaced with some kind of brazier-like technology in Hoseo, Honam, and western Yeongnam.

Bronze objects were exchanged into the Korean Peninsula from the outside before 900 BC. However, the moulds for bronze casting from Songguk-ri and an increased number of bronze artifacts indicates that people in the southern part of the peninsula engaged in bronze metallurgical production starting from c. 700 BC. Several hundred years later iron production was adopted, and Korean-made iron tools and weaponry became increasingly common after approximately 200 BC. Iron tools facilitated the spread of intensive agriculture into new areas of the Korean Peninsula.

Until recently, Koreans were thought to have invented under-floor heating, a system they call "ondol". It was first thought to have been invented by the people of the Northern Okjeo around 2,500 years ago. However, the recent discovery of a c. 3,000-year-old equivalent indoor heating system in Alaska has called current explanation into question. The absence of prehistoric and/or ancient ondol features in the area between the two archaeological sites makes it unlikely that the two systems might have come from the same source. However, there has also been hypothesis that whale-hunting people from the Korean peninsula have migrated to Alaska by sea during the time period, and this could explain the phenomenon.

== Three Kingdoms Period ==
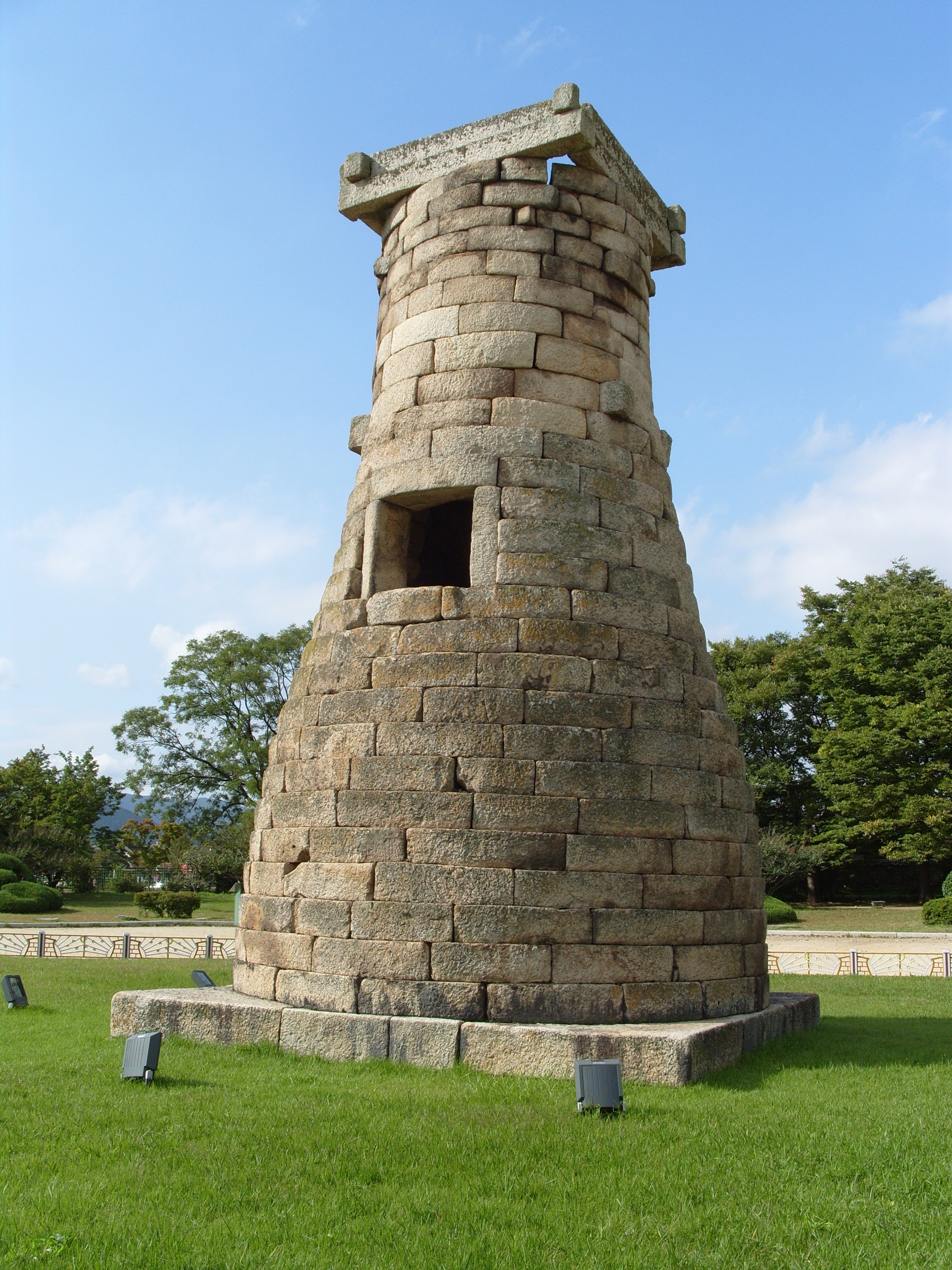
Cheomseongdae observatory

The production of hard-fired stoneware ceramics, in which clay is vitrified in kilns at >1000 °C, occurred first in the Korean Peninsula during the Three Kingdoms Period.

This period is notable for the establishment of industrial-scale production of pottery and roof tiles. This involved the adoption of Chinese dragon kiln or climbing kiln technology sometime between AD 100–300.

One of very few examples of science and technology during the Three Kingdoms of Korea that has survived until this day is the Cheomseongdae, which means "star gazing platform" and is one of the oldest observatories installed on Earth. It was built during Queen Seondeok's rule. The tower is built out of 366 pieces of cut granite which some claim represent the 366 days of the lunar year and has 12 base stones which supposedly represent the twelve months of the year. The design is said to be strongly influenced by Buddhism.

The nine-story wooden pagoda of Hwangnyongsa, which was commissioned by Queen Seondeok after the main temple was finished, is reputed to be the largest premodern Korean stupa ever built. It was reported to be 80 metres in height. Only its foundation stones remain today but they attest to the mammoth proportions of the original structure.

== Goryeo ==
During the Goryeo period, metal movable type printing was invented by Ch'oe Yun-ŭi in 1234. This invention made printing easier, more efficient and also increased literacy, which observed by Chinese visitors was seen to be so important where it was considered to be shameful to not be able to read. The Mongol Empire later adopted Korea's movable type printing and spread as far as Central Asia. There is conjecture as to whether or not Ch'oe's invention had any influence on later printing inventions such as Gutenberg's Printing press. When the Mongols invaded Europe they inadvertently introduced different kinds of Asian technology.

During the late Goryeo Dynasty, Goryeo was at the cutting edge of shipboard artillery in world. In 1356 early experiments were carried out with gunpowder weapons that shot wood or metal projectiles. In 1373 experiments with incendiary arrows and "fire tubes" possibly an early form of the Hwacha were developed and placed on Korean warships. The policy of placing cannons and other gunpowder weapons continued well into the Joseon period and by 1410, over 160 Joseon warships had cannons on board. Ch'oe Mu-sŏn, a medieval Korean inventor, military commander and scientist, introduced the widespread use of gunpowder to Korea for the first time and created various gunpowder-based weapons. The weapons were created because of Japanese pirates (Wokou) frequently raiding Korea's coastal regions. Ch'oe obtained knowledge of gunpowder from a Chinese merchant named Lee Yuan despite the fact that it was against Mongol law. Lee was at first reluctant but eventually came around because he was impressed by Ch'oe's patriotism and determination. Ch'oe later impressed the Koryo court and King U which then built him a laboratory and a factory geared solely toward gunpowder. He invented the first Korean cannons and other weapons such as the Singijeon (Korean fire arrows) and later the Hwacha which were first built in 1377 and are widely considered to be the first true multiple rocket launchers. These weapons were a vast improvement over the previous rocket weapons with one of the key features was that it could fire up to 200 rockets at one time.

== Joseon ==
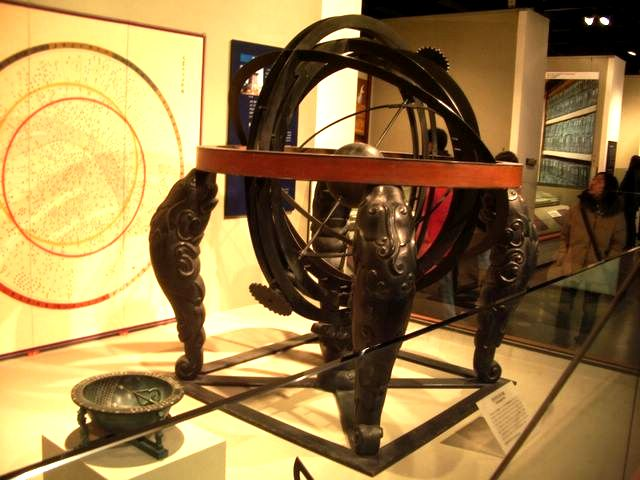
Korean celestial globe first made by the scientist Chang Yŏngsil during the reign of King Sejong

=== 15th century ===
The Joseon Dynasty under the reign of Sejong the Great was Korea's greatest period of scientific advancement. In the first half of the 15th century, around 62 major accomplishments were made in various scientific fields. Of these, 29 came from Korea alone compared to 5 from China and 28 from the rest of the world.

Under Sejong's new policy Cheonmin (low-status) people such as Chang Yŏngsil were allowed to work for the government. At a young age, Chang displayed talent as an inventor and engineer, creating machines to facilitate agricultural work. These included supervising the building of aqueducts and canals. Chang eventually was allowed to live at the royal palace, where he led a group of scientists to work on advancing Korea's science.

Some of his inventions were an automated (self-striking) water clock (the Jagyeokru) which worked by activating motions of wooden figures to indicate time visually (invented in 1434 by Chang), a subsequent more complicated water-clock with additional astronomical devices, and an improved model of the previous metal movable printing type created in the Goryeo period. The new model was of even higher quality and was twice as fast. Other inventions were the sight glass, and the udometer.

The highpoint of Korean astronomy was during the Joseon period, where men such as Chang created devices such as celestial globes which indicated the positions of the sun, moon, and the stars. Later celestial globes (Kyup'yo, 규표) were attuned to the seasonal variations.

The apex of astronomical and calendarial advances under King Sejong was the Chiljeongsan, which compiled computations of the courses of the seven heavenly objects (five visible planets, the sun, and moon), developed in 1442. This work made it possible for scientists to calculate and accurately predict all the major heavenly phenomena, such as solar eclipses and other stellar movements. Honcheonsigye is an astronomical clock created by Song I-yeong in 1669. The clock has an armillary sphere with a diameter of 40 cm (16 in). The sphere is activated by a working clock mechanism, showing the position of celestial objects at any given time.

Hunminjeongeum, the original version of Hangul published by King Sejong in 1444

Kangnido, a Korean-made map of the world was created in 1402 by Kim Sa-hyeong (김사형; 金士衡), Yi Mu (이무; 李茂) and Yi Hoe (이회; 李撓). The map was created in the second year of the reign of Taejong of Joseon. The map was made by combining Chinese, Korean and Japanese maps.

Hangul, the first and only featural alphabet in current use for a national language, was promulgated by Sejong in 1444. Hangul is an artificial writing system created based on science, and although about 600 years have passed since King Sejong created Hangul, North and South Korea still use Hangul. In addition, Hangul is one of the few unique writing systems in the world that does not originate from Egyptian script or Chinese character.

=== 16th to 19th centuries ===
The scientific and technological advance in the late Joseon Dynasty was less progressed than the early Joseon period.

16th-century court physician, Heo Jun wrote a number of medical texts, his most significant achievement being Dongeui Bogam, which is often noted as the defining text of Traditional Korean medicine. The work spread to its East Asian neighbors, China and Japan, where it is still regarded as one of the classics of Oriental medicine today.

The first soft ballistic vest, Myunjebaegab, was invented in Joseon Korea in the 1860s shortly after the French campaign against Korea (1866). Heungseon Daewongun ordered development of bullet-proof armor because of increasing threats from Western armies. Kim Gi-du and Gang Yun found that cotton could protect against bullets if thick enough, and devised bullet-proof vests made of 30 layers of cotton. The vests were used in battle during the United States expedition to Korea (1871), when the US Navy attacked Ganghwa Island in 1871. The US Army captured one of the vests and took it to the US, where it was stored at the Smithsonian Museum until 2007. The vest has since been sent back to Korea and is currently on display to the public.

== Modern period ==
=== North Korea ===
In late 1985 North Korea's first integrated circuit plant became operational. By the early 1990s, North Korea was producing about 20,000 computers a year, reportedly 60% were exported and the remainder were mostly for domestic military use. The development of a software industry started in the early 1990s. In general, software development is on a high level and it could become a major export item in the future, along with world-class voice recognition, automation and medical technology. North Korea has developed its own operating system, the Red Star, and has an intranet network named Kwangmyong, which contains censored content from the Internet. North Korean IT specialists demonstrate a high degree of technological literacy.

The National Aerospace Development Administration is the country's national space agency. As of 2010, two space launch facilities are operational—the Tonghae Satellite Launching Ground in North Hamgyong Province, and the Tongch'ang-dong Space Launch Center in North Pyongan Province. Kwangmyŏngsŏng-class satellites were launched from the former site by means of Paektusan and Unha rockets. So far, a total of three launch attempts were made, although none of them was successful.

North Korea is also researching and deploying various military technologies, such as GPS jammers, stealth paint, midget submarines and chemical, biological and nuclear weapons, anti-personnel lasers and ballistic missiles.

=== South Korea ===
Modern scientific and technological development in South Korea at first did not occur largely because of more pressing matters such as the division of Korea and the Korean War that occurred right after its independence. It was not until the 1960s under the dictatorship of Park Chung Hee where South Korea's economy rapidly grew from industrialisation and the Chaebol corporations such as Samsung and LG.

As of 2008 South Korea ranked 5th highest in terms of R&D. Park Kye-jung, CEO of Ace Electronics, won the Gold and Silver prizes for his invention of motor and motor-equipped gear at the 23rd Invention and New Product Exposition (INPEX). Park took the gold medal with his invention of a special device that converts vibrations from a running car into electric power. During the INPEX held in Pittsburgh, Pennsylvania, sixteen Korean inventions received awards, including four gold prizes, three silvers, three bronzes and six special prizes. The Pittsburgh INPEX had inventors from 20 countries, including contenders from Australia, Germany, the United States, and 11 other countries, with a total of 160 submitted items.

Seoul is ranked as the world's "leading digital city" and a "tech capital of the world". South Korea is also among the world's most technologically advanced and digitally connected countries; it has the third most broadband Internet users among the OECD countries and is a global leader in electronics, digital displays, semiconductor devices, and mobile phones.

The scientist Hwang Woo-suk, now officially disgraced, led a bio-engineering team that created three living clones of a dog that died in 2002.

Korea also exports radioactive isotope production equipment for medical and industrial use to countries such as Russia, Japan, Turkey and others.

Korea has a full-fledged space partnership with Russia and has launched the Arirang-1 and Arirang-2 satellites, both of which are equipped with surveillance cameras.

In robotics, KAIST competes with the Japanese company Honda with its humanoid robot HUBO. Honda's ASIMO and KAIST's HUBO lines are the two of very few humanoid robots that can walk. The first HUBO was developed within a span of 3 years and cost US$1 million.

In renewable energy, South Korean scientists at the Gwangju Institute of Science and Technology, in cooperation with the University of California, Santa Barbara, successfully developed an organic photovoltaic power cell with energy efficiency of 6.5 percent.

Results of a Statista study were released in August 2013 in regard to global smartphone penetration. After the United Arab Emirates (UAE), South Korea was the nation with the second-highest penetration level—73.0% of the population.

Following cyberattacks in the first half of 2013, in which government, news media, television station, and bank websites were compromised, the national government committed itself to training 5,000 new cybersecurity experts by 2017. The South Korean government blamed its northern counterpart for these attacks, as well as for incidents that occurred in 2009, 2011, and 2012, but Pyongyang denies these accusations.

In late September 2013, a computer-security competition jointly sponsored by the defense ministry and the National Intelligence Service was announced. The winners will be announced on 29 September 2013 and will share a total prize pool of 80 million won (US$74,000).

Today, South Korea is known as a launchpad for developers into a mature mobile market with very few technology constraints. New types of media or apps using South Korea's 4G and 5G internet infrastructure are increasingly being developed. South Korea enjoys a convergence of a dense and prosperous population, excellent infrastructure, and a strong cultural identity. Republic of Korea was ranked 6th in the Global Innovation Index in 2022.

== See also ==
- List of Korean inventions and discoveries
- Traditional Korean medicine

== Works cited ==
- Barnes, Gina L. 2001 State Formation in Korea: Historical and Archaeological Perspectives. London: Curzon
- Crawford, Gary W.; Lee, Gyoung-Ah (2003). "Agricultural Origins in the Korean Peninsula". Antiquity. 77 (295): 87–95. doi:10.1017/s0003598x00061378. S2CID 163060564.
- Kuzmin, Yaroslav V (2006). "Chronology of the Earliest Pottery in East Asia: Progress and Pitfalls". Antiquity. 80 (308): 362–371. doi:10.1017/s0003598x00093686. S2CID 17316841.
- Lee, Sung-joo. 1998. Silla - Gaya Sahwoe-eui Giwon-gwa Seongjang [The Rise and Growth of Society in Silla and Gaya]. Seoul: Hakyeon Munhwasa.
- Seong-Rae, Park. 2005. Science and Technology in Korean History, Excursions, Innovations and Issues.
- Sang-woon, Jeon. 1998. A History of Science in Korea.
