= Noksu =

South Korean medical organization

Noksu Medical Voluntary Organization
- Founded: April 19, 1966
- Founder: Prof. Jun-Jeon Mun and 40 undergraduate students
- Type: Medical Service
- Location: College of Oriental Medicine Kyung Hee University
- Region served: South Korea
- Product: Traditional Korean Medicine
- Members: 557
- Owner: Prof. Seung-Gi Jung; Prof. Myung-ja Wang
- Key people: 45th President Jung-Han Bae; Vice President Eun-Bi Jo
- Endowment: National Agricultural Cooperative Federation; Seoul Housing Corporation
- Volunteers: 49
- Website: [www dot noksu dot org]

Noksu (Korean: 녹수회; Hanja: 綠樹會) is a medical volunteer organization of Kyung Hee University, Seoul, South Korea. Membership consists of students and graduates of the College of Oriental Medicine and the College of Nursing Sciences. The organization is one of six volunteer organizations of the College of Oriental Medicine, widely regarded as one of the university's most prestigious organizations.

In 2010 the social-service ASAN Foundation awarded Noksu first place in South Korea for outstanding volunteer performance.

- The name "Noksu" translates to "Green Tree."

== History ==
Noksu was founded on April 19, 1960. Its focus has been to provide volunteer medical and public-health services to rural and urban communities. Since its inception students and graduates, especially those majoring in Korean medicine, have collaborated to promote public health.

Every year, numerous students interested in voluntary service have joined Noksu. In 2010, the organization counted a total of 557 members, 49 of whom were active undergraduates.

== Guidance ==
Noksu has been under the guidance of active professors who themselves were undergraduate members of the organization.

- Founding Professor - Jun-Jeon Mun (1966~)
- Second Guidance Professor - Gwang-Ho Kim (~2004)
- Third Co-Guidance Professors - Seung-Gi Jung, head of the Allergy and Respiratory Diseases Department at Kyung Hee University Medical Center and a professor in the College of Oriental Medicine; and Myung-Ja Wang, a professor in the College of Nursing Sciences (2005~)

== Motto and song ==
Noksu's Motto is "겸손과 사랑으로 진정한 봉사를 이루자".
Translation: "Sincere volunteering through humble hearts."

Noksu's song is as follows.
1st Verse
젊음을 부르는 대학가에, 앞날에 희망을 꿈꾸며, 언제나 다정한 그 모습들, 오늘도 모였네 녹수회.
2nd Verse
태양이 비치는 백사장에, 언제나 밀려오는 파도처럼, 우리들의 우정도 변치말자, 오늘도 모였네 녹수회.

== Medical Voluntary Service ==
Rural Service

During each summer and winter break, guidance professors, undergraduate and graduate members of Noksu survey rural districts with poor medical access. For districts meeting certain conditions, extensive medical service is given. The voluntary service spans seven days, including the set-up and dismantling of a temporary clinic. Patients visiting the clinic receive simple health check-ups and Traditional Korean Medicine such as acupuncture, moxabustion and herbal medicine. Brief lectures are given on common conditions such as hypertension, coronary diseases and diabetes to promote public health awareness.

=== Local Service ===
During the rapid development of South Korea's capital city, Seoul, residents in some suburban areas have been left lacking in medical services, prompting Noksu to begin extending its help locally in 2002. Supported by Seoul Housing Corporation, Noksu has been able to give brief medical coverage to senior residents living in government-funded apartments. Check-ups include screening and follow-up tests for hypertension and diabetes. Traditional Korean Medicine is also used to diagnose and treat patients.

Additional Service

Despite an increasing number of international marriages, the national medical system does not cover migrants who have not yet acquired a green card or citizenship. The staff has decided to provide voluntary service to such mixed-nationality families.

== Life and culture ==
Noksu casts itself not only as an organization for volunteering but also as a big family. Frequent meetings and training courses are scheduled throughout the year emphasizing the idea of community.

- Regular meetings begin and end each semester
- An introductory workshop on volunteering takes place at the beginning of first semester
- A family picnic is held at the end of first semester's midterm
- Membership training continues through each semester

== 2011 staff ==
The staff is chosen in an election at end of the second semester every year. In 2011, the organization's 45th year, staff members were:

- President - Jung-Han Bae
- Vice President - Eun-Bee Jo
- Treasurer - Sang-Jun Park and Youn-A Choi
- Head of Local Volunteer Service
- Head of Extension Volunteer Service
- Server and Archive Management - Hyun-Hwa Jo
- Public Relations

== Awards and ceremonies ==
- Annual ASAN Foundation Award for Voluntary Organization - 1st place (2010)

== See also ==
- Kyung Hee University
- Traditional Korean medicine
- Sasang typology
- Dongui Bogam
- Yakchim
