= Neo-Viagra-Y.R. =

North Korean alleged medical cure

Neo-Viagra-Y.R. (Korean: 네오비아그라-Y.R.(청춘부활)) is a pharmaceutical product produced by the Korea Oriental Instant Medicinal Centre, a state-owned North Korean company. The product was developed in 2005, by north Korean doctor Ryu Il nam. Although marketed as a herbal health supplement based in Koryo medicine (traditional Korean medicine promoted by North Korea), analysis of the product shows that its active ingredient is 50 mg of Sildenafil (the lowest dose of Pfizer's genuine Viagra tablets), though used in a different formulation to genuine Viagra tablets. As the drug has not been independently clinically tested, it may cause serious side effects such as a heart attack or death.

The product is marketed as medicine which can cure sexual dysfunction in both men and women, cure hepatitis, ease bone pain, cure kidney dysfunction and arteriosclerosis, with testimonials describing it as "the magic medication of the 21st century". Promotional material for the product describes it as "the best sexual function activator at the moment" which is "officially recognized in many countries for its excellent effect in immediately increasing stamina and it is believed to be better than American Sildenafil (Viagra)".

It is believed to be primarily targeted for export, as a means for the North Korean government (which is subject to economic sanctions) to earn foreign currency. It is sold by websites based in China and Russia. In 2017, police in Busan, South Korea, arrested three Russian nationals for illegally selling North Korean Sildenafil and Neo-Viagra-Y.R. tablets in South Korea.

== See also ==
- Illicit activities of North Korea, which formerly included the selling of fake Viagra tablets
- Pugang Pharmaceutic Company, another North Korean pharmaceutical company:
  - Royal Blood-Fresh
  - Kumdang-2
- Tetrodocain
