= Constitution type =

Constitution type or body type can refer to a number of attempts to classify human body shapes:

- Humours (Ayurveda)
- Somatotype of William Herbert Sheldon
- Paul Carus's character typology
- Ernst Kretschmer's character typology
- Elliot Abravanel's glandular metabolism typology
- Sasang typology by Je-Ma Lee
- Bertil Lundman's racial classification system

== See also ==
- Female body shape
- Body shape
- Enterotype
- Habitus (disambiguation)
- Phrenology
- Physiognomy
