= Hur Jun, The Original Story =

2013 South Korean TV drama series

- Promotional poster
- Hangul: 구암 허준
- RR: Guam Heo Jun
- MR: Kuam Hŏ Chun
- Genre: Historical drama Medical drama Romance
- Written by: Choi Wan-kyu
- Directed by: Kim Geun-hong; Kwon Sung-chang
- Starring: Kim Joo-hyuk; Park Jin-hee; Park Eun-bin; Namkoong Min; Baek Yoon-sik
- Composer: Hong Dong Pyo
- Country of origin: South Korea
- Original language: Korean
- No. of episodes: 135

Production
- Executive producer: Shin Hyun-chang
- Producer: Yoo Hyun Jong
- Running time: 35 minutes
- Production company: Munhwa Broadcasting Corporation

Original release
- Network: MBC TV
- Release: March 18 – September 23, 2013

Related
- Hur Jun

Hur Jun, The Original Story (Korean: 구암 허준) is a 2013 South Korean television series about the life of Heo Jun, a commoner who rose up the ranks to become a royal physician in Joseon (he used the art name "Guam"). It aired on MBC from March 18 to September 23, 2013 on Mondays to Fridays at 20:50 for 135 episodes.

Heo Jun was the author of the famed oriental medicine textbook Dongui Bogam (lit. "Mirror of Eastern Medicine"), considered the defining text of traditional Korean medicine. This was the fifth dramatization of his life. Lead actor Kim Joo-hyuk is the son of Kim Mu-saeng, who also played the same character in the 1975 series Tenacity.

== Plot ==
Heo Jun is the son of a concubine and the governor of Yeongcheon. When he witnesses brilliant doctor Yoo Ui-tae save a dying person, he decides to become a doctor. First he works as a medicinal herb gatherer, then with the help of Ye-jin at Yoo Ui-tae's clinic, he studies rare medical texts imported from the Ming dynasty. With his expanded medical knowledge, Heo Jun begins to treat patients under Yoo Ui-tae's tutelage. But he later despairs of his inability to cure his mentor's stomach cancer. Despite the era's oppressive caste system and his commoner background, Heo Jun rises to the top of his field and becomes King Seonjo's royal physician.

== Cast ==
=== Main cast ===
- Kim Joo-hyuk as Heo Jun
  - Kang Han-byeol as young Heo Jun
- Park Jin-hee as Ye-jin
- Park Eun-bin as Da-hee
- Namkoong Min as Yoo Do-ji
- Baek Yoon-sik as Yoo Ui-tae

=== Supporting cast ===
==== Heo family ====
- Go Doo-shim as Madam Son
- Lee Jae-yong as Kim Min-se
- Jung Ho-bin as Ahn Kwang-ik
- Yeo Ho-min as Yang-tae
  - Jang Jae-won as young Yang-tae
- Choi Sang-hoon as Heo Ryun
- Kim Hye-jung as Lady Jang Jung-shil
- Won Ki-joon as Heo Seok
  - Kang Yi-seok as young Heo Seok
- Kim So-yeon as Im Mi-hyun
- Lee Hae-woo as Heo Gyeom

==== Gu family ====
- Park Chul-min as Gu Il-seo
- Kyeon Mi-ri as Ham Ahn-daek
- Kwak Ji-min as Gu Un-nyeon
- Son Heon-soo as Jang Man-deok

==== Yoo family ====
- Kim Mi-sook as Lady Oh
- Kim Hyo-yeon as Kwon Sook-jung
- Shin Kwi-shik as Kwon Hyuk-soo

==== Pharmacy ====
- Jung Eun-pyo as Im Oh-geun
- Kim So-yi as Ha Dong-daek
- Lee Da-yeon as Yoo Wol-yi
- Jung Ji-ah as Cho-rye
- Yoon Seul as Mi-geum
- Kim Joong-ki as Busanpo
- Oh Dae-hwan as Jang-swe
- Go Young-min as Young-dal
- Oh Yong as Gguk-swe

==== Royal Court ====
- Jeon No-min as King Seonjo
- Jang Ji-eun as Lady Kim Gong-bin
- Jung Si-ah as Lady Kim In-bin
- In Gyo-jin as Prince Gwanghae
- Kim Jin-seong as Prince Sinseong
- Seo Yi-ahn as Queen Inmok

==== Royal Hospital ====
- Choi Jong-hwan as Yang Ye-soo
- Lee Han-wi as Kim Man-kyung
- Kim Hyuk as Kim Hong-ki
- Kim Jung-hwan Lee Myung-hwan
- Go Yoon-hoo as Jung Tae-eun
- Yoo Seung-bong as Jung Jak
- Kim Jin-ho as Kim Eung-taek
- Hwang Bum-shik as Song Hak-gyu
- Son Yeo-eun as So-hyun
- Han Bo-bae as Chae-sun
- Yoon Yoo-sun as Hong Choon-yi
- Choi Ye-jin as Deok-geum
- Ga Deuk-hee as Se-hee
- Shin Bok-sook as Female palace physician
- Lee Seung-ah as Gae-geum
- Kang Cho-hee as Ohn-ji
- Lee Soo-in as Ok-jung
- Park Kyung-hwan as Doyak Saryeong

=== Extended cast ===
- Ji Sang-hyuk as Sang-hwa
- Jo Soo-jung as Soo-yeon
- Jo Woo-jin as Woo Gong-bo
- Lee Kye-in as Dol-swe
- Hyun Chul-ho as Public officer Kim
- Kim Byung-ki as Sung In-chul
- Na Sung-kyun as Jung Sung-pil
- Song Jae-hee as Lee Jung-myung
- Kim Cheol-ki as Bae Chun-soo
- Yoo Tae-woong as Kim Gong-ryang
- Lee Chan as Kim Byung-jo
- Shin Gook as Prime minister
- Im Seung-dae as Eunuch
- Joo Ah-sung as Gu Tae-hoon
- Hwang Bo-mi as Lady Jang
- Choi Hyun-seo as Eun-ok
- Ryu Sung-hoon as Jang Jung
- Hyun Chul-ho as Mr. Kim

== Awards and nominations ==
Year	Award	Category	Recipient	Result
2013	MBC Drama Awards	Top Excellence Award, Actor in a Serial Drama	Kim Joo-hyuk	Nominated
2013	MBC Drama Awards	Excellence Award, Actor in a Serial Drama	Namkoong Min	Nominated
2013	MBC Drama Awards	Golden Acting Award, Actor	Baek Yoon-sik	Nominated
2013	MBC Drama Awards	Best New Actress	Park Eun-bin	Nominated
