= Korea Oriental Instant Medicinal Centre =

North Korean medical company

- Logo for the company
- Industry: Pharmaceutical; Biotechnology
- Founded: 1968; 57 years ago in Pyongyang
- Headquarters: North Korea
- Products: Pharmaceuticals

The Korea Oriental Instant Medicinal Centre (Korean: 조선동방즉효성약물센터 or 조선동방즉효약물개발사) is a state-owned North Korean pharmaceutical company founded in 1968. It is best known for selling Neo-Viagra-Y.R., an alleged traditional Korean (Koryo) medical supplement, whose active ingredient is 50 mg of Sildenafil (Viagra), combined with Korean herbal medicines.

== Products ==
- Neo-Viagra-Y.R.
- Tongbanghangamso(동방항암소):medicine for purported cancer treatment made from korean traditional medicine ingredients such as ginseng and Eleutherococcus (known in korean as Ogapi).
- Hyolgwansechokso(혈관세척소):medicine purported to have blood vessel cleaning effects using ingredients such as herb extracts.

== See also ==
- Pugang Pharmaceutic Company, another state-run pharmaceutical company in North Korea
