= Zilahy =

Zilahy is a Hungarian surname that may refer to

- Gyula Zilahy (1859–1938), Hungarian stage and film actor
- Irène Zilahy (1904–1944), Hungarian actress
- Lajos Zilahy (1891–1974), Hungarian novelist and playwright
- Péter Zilahy (born 1970), Hungarian writer and performer
