= Dmitry Kuzmin =

Russian poet, critic, and publisher; anti-homophobia activist

- Дмитрий Кузьмин
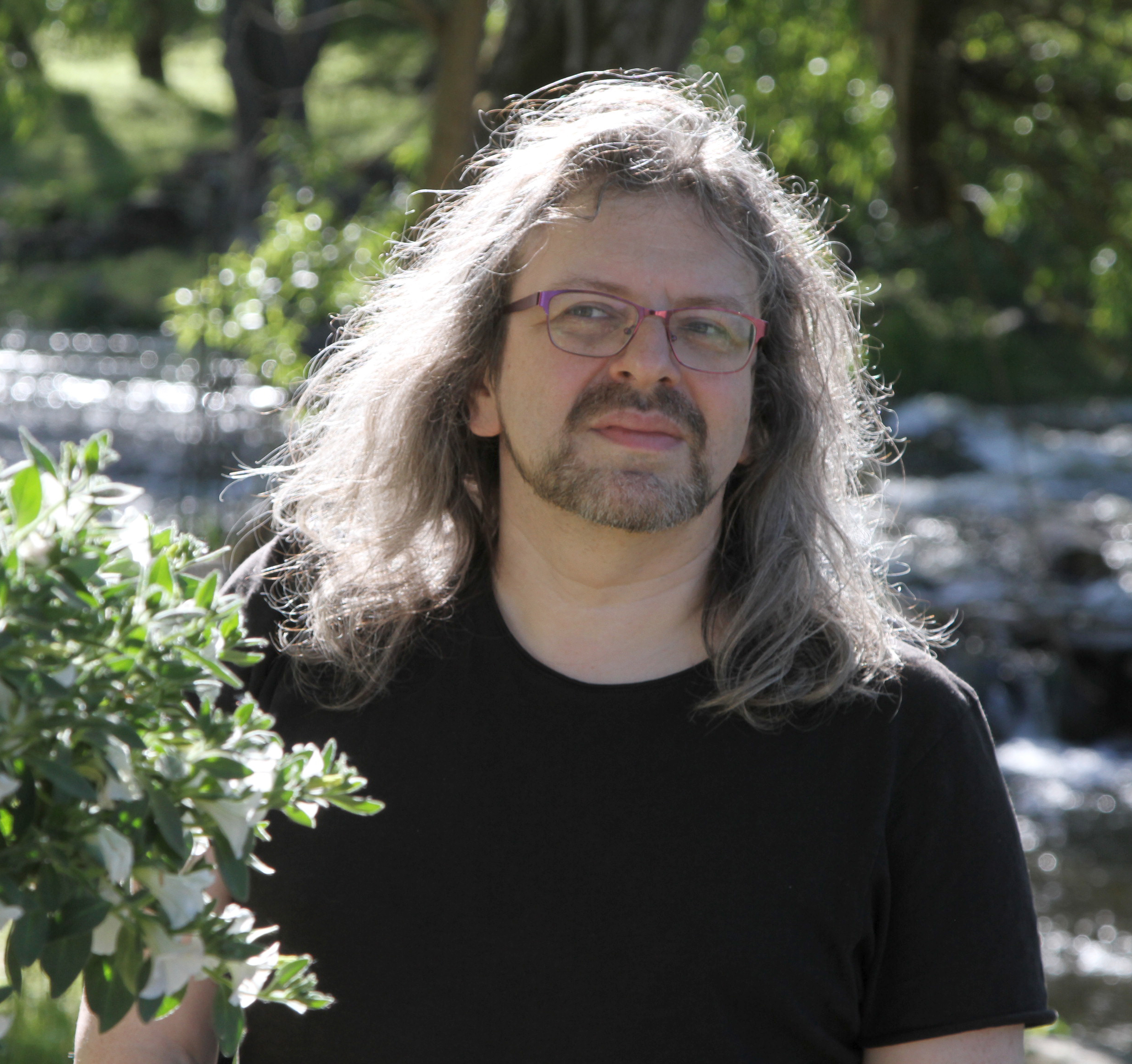
- Born: December 12, 1968 (age 57); Moscow, Soviet Union
- Education: Moscow State Pedagogical University
- Occupations: Poet, critic, and publisher.
- Awards: Moscow Account

Dmitry Vladimirovich Kuzmin (Russian: Дми́трий Влади́мирович Кузьми́н, born December 12, 1968), is a Russian poet, critic, and publisher.

== Biography ==
Kuzmin was born in Moscow, son of the architect Vladimir Legoshin and the literary critic Edwarda Kuzmina; among his grandparents were the critic Boris Kuzmin and the prominent literary translator Nora Gal. In 1985-87 he was enrolled in philology at Moscow State University, but was expelled from it. He graduated with a bachelor's degree in philology from Moscow State Pedagogical University in 1993. In 2005, he got a PhD for his thesis on one-line poems. In 2014, he is visiting professor in Princeton University. Since then he lives in Latvia claiming himself a protester against Vladimir Putin's regime in Russia.

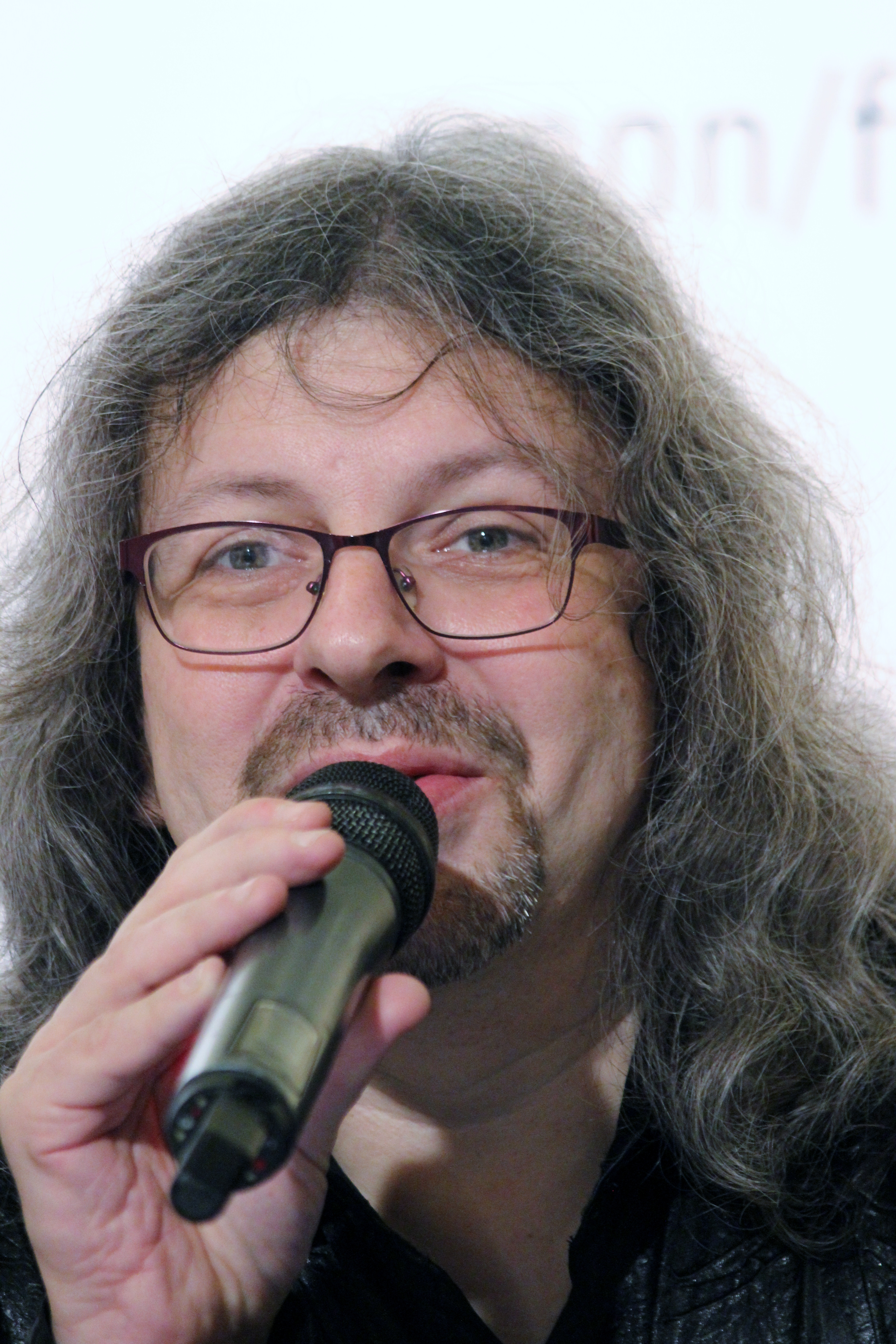
Kuzmin in 2019

== Activities ==
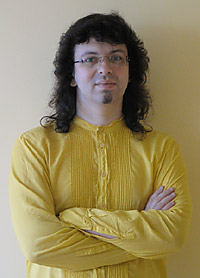
Dmitry Kuzmin in 2004

He started his literary career in 1988 by organizing a group of poets who now are known as the "Vavilon" circle of poets/writers (this is the Russian word for Babylon). He and his friends started publishing an independent book series called The Library of Young Literature. In 1993 he founded the ARGO-RISK (Russian: АРГО-РИСК), an independent poetry press. In 1996 he published the first issue of the gay almanac called RISK. In 1997, he created a resource site at Vavilon.ru, where he made available texts by, as he claims, about 180 Russian writers. Kuzmin declared that the main purpose of the site was to resist the huge wave of “commercial literature”, which began flooding the Russian market for the first time since the 1920s. In 2007, he founded LitKarta, a reference site that provides information on a number of members of the Russian literary community.

Kuzmin organised quite a number of poetry readings and festivals, "non-commercial", as he referred to them. He claims that he has published about 300 books by other writers. He won a few awards for promotion of the works by young writers, including the Andrei Bely Prize (2002). Later, he became a Committee member for this award). Since 2006 he has been editing the literary magazine called Vozdukh, "the newest undertaking of the effervescent young poet, critic and publisher" as Canadian slavist Allan Reid put it. In 2007, the assembly of the editors of leading Russian literary magazines voted against including Vozdukh in Zhurnalny Zal, an Internet library of Russian literary magazines, this decision was claimed controversial and unfair by some Russian authors. Kuzmin is also a member of the Advisory Board for St. Petersburg Review.

Kuzmin actively promotes gay culture and fights homophobia. Kuzmin's poems (including explicitly gay ones) and essays appeared in some Russian literary magazines. In 2008 he published a collection of his poems and translations. Some of his poems were translated into English (A Public Space, Habitus, Aufgabe, Fulcrum, The Brooklyn Rail, Big Bridge, Zymbol e. a.), French (Europe), Serbian (Treći Trg), Estonian (Vikerkaar), selection of Ukrainian translations was published in 2018 as a book titled Blankets Are Not Included. As Russian scholar Ilya Kukulin points out, "The subject of his poems is the nonconformist who has a critical attitude toward himself and the society he is part of, yet his perception of the world is impressionistic rather than discursive". Another scholar, Vitaly Chernetsky, traces the origins of Kuzmin's manner to Frank O'Hara's poetics.

== Selected bibliography ==
=== As editor ===
- The almanac: RISK (In Russian:1996-2000)
- The haiku almanac: Triton (In Russian:2000-2004)
- Very Short Texts: An Anthology of Flash Fiction (In Russian:2000)
- Ulysses Released: Contemporary Russian Poets Abroad (In Russian:2004)
- Nine Measurements: An Anthology of Contemporary Russian Poetry (In Russian:2004)
- Contemporary Russian Poetry (In Slovenian:2010)
- El armario de acero: Amores clandestinos en la Rusia actual (Contemporary Russian Gay and Lesbian authors; In Spanish:2014)

=== As co-editor ===
- Amerika: Russian Writers View the United States Dalkey Archive Press, 2004.
- An Anthology of Contemporary Russian Women Poets University Of Iowa Press, 2005.

=== As publisher ===
- The Series: “Library of Young Russian Writers” (In Russian:1993-1998)
- The Series: “Generations” (In Russian:2004–present)
- The Series: “Vozdukh” (In Russian:2004–present)
- The Poetry Journal Vozdukh (In Russian:2006–present)

=== English translations of his poems ===
Some of his poems have been translated into English and have appeared in the following publications:

- Essay in Poetics: Journal of Neo-Formalist Circle. Newcastle, Keel University, 1994. / Tr. Robert Reid
- Out of the Blue: Russia's Hidden Gay Literature. An Anthology. Edited by Kevin Moss. San Francisco: Gay Sunshine Press, 1996. / Tr. Vitaly Chernetsky
- Crossing Centuries: The New Wave in Russian Poetry. Jersey City, Talisman House Publishers, 2000. / Tr. Vitaly Chernetsky
- The Poetry of Men's Lives: An International Anthology. University of Georgia Press, 2004. / Tr. Vitaly Chernetsky
