= Kang Han-byeol =

South Korean actor

- Born: June 3, 2002 (age 24); Anyang, Gyeonggi, South Korea
- Occupation: Actor
- Years active: 2008–2015

Korean name
- Hangul: 강한별
- RR: Gang Hanbyeol
- MR: Kang Hanbyŏl

Kang Han-byeol (born June 3, 2002) is a South Korean former child actor. He began his career as a child actor in 2008, and was given roles in television dramas such as Boys Over Flowers (2008–09) The King 2 Hearts (2012) and Hur Jun, The Original Story (2013). Inactive from 2015, he returned to the small screen in 2022 as an adult contestant on the ninth season of I Can See Your Voice.

== Filmography ==
=== Television series ===
Year	Title	Role
2008	The Great King, Sejong	young Grand Prince Anpyeong
2008	Beethoven Virus	one of kids
2008	Love Marriage	Jo Yong-han
2009	Boys Over Flowers	child Gu Jun-pyo
2009	Enjoy Life	Sebastian
2010	Happiness in the Wind	Jang Dok-rip
2011	The King of Legend	Wani Keun Eo-ji
2011	Bride of the Sun	Kim Yoo-min
2012	The King 2 Hearts	young Lee Jae-ha
2012	The King's Doctor	young Crown Prince (later King Sukjong)
2013	Hur Jun, The Original Story	young Heo Jun
2013	Thunder Store 1	Himself
2014	Thunder Store 2	Himself
2015	Orange Marmalade	young Han Si-hoo

=== Film ===
Year	Title	Role
2007	Bunt	

=== Variety show ===
Year	Title	Role	Notes
2009	It's a Gag	Lee Moon-won's nephew	sketch: "Lovers of 7 Years"
2022	I Can See Your Voice 9	contestant	Video on YouTube

=== Music video appearances ===
Year	Song title	Artist
2007	"A Christmas Story"	SG Wannabe
