= Naeŭiwŏn =

Korean palace pharmacy

Naeŭiwŏn (Korean: 내의원; Hanja: 內醫院) was a palace pharmacy during the pre-modern Joseon period. In a literal sense, it refers to the place located at the palace for medical issues. Its other names were such as Naeguk (내국; 內局) and Naeyakbang (내약방; 內藥房) which also designated the place or room for treatment. In Changdeokgung, one of Five Grand Palaces, tourists can experience how royal physicians worked long before modern Western medicine arrived in the Korean Peninsula.

== History ==
The first formation of Naeŭiwŏn firstly appeared at the reign of Taejong of Joseon under the title of Naeyakbang - Yak bang which means pharmacy room. Later in 1443 during Sejong's era, the title name of Naeŭiwŏn was announced, which implies that before 1443, an independent organ for medical issues did not exist. The full personnel was 16 people and each was called Eoui (어의), meaning a royal physician. There were also women doctors who only took care of higher-ranking women.

After three decades passed, Sejo initiated government offices, while the transformation of personnel occurred depending on contemporary situation.

Throughout Joseon, Naeŭiwŏn was the central location of medical affairs, influencing the practice of Korean medicine.

== Administration ==
Generally speaking, Naeŭiwŏn refers to the place in charge of royal family's health and medical affair. Additionally, as royal cuisine of Joseon was quite different from normal dining at that time, Eoui also took charge of serving appropriate diet depending on the symptom and preserving materia medica.

== See also ==
- Dongui Bogam
- Heo Jun

== Note ==
- Yoon Suk ja, 2009, ≪Interesting food story≫
