= Tetrodocain =

North Korean medical injection

Tetrodocain (Korean: 테트로도카인주사약) is medical injection produced by the Korea Jangsaeng Joint Venture Company (조선장생합영회사) in North Korea. The injection was first claimed to be invented by the company in 2004. According to the state-run Korean Central News Agency (KCNA), the main ingredient of the injection is tetrodotoxin, isolated from puffer poisons, and operates as an anaesthetic. It has been sold for international export on sites based in Russia and China.

KCNA described the medicine as efficacious in treating a wide range of diseases, including cancer, tuberculosis, chronic hepatitis, pancreatitis and HIV/AIDS. These claims have been deemed to be either exaggerated or false. The North Korean government also marketed its use in drug detoxification from narcotics such as opium, cocaine and heroin.

== Related works ==
North Korea released a supposed clinical research thesis about the usage of tetrodocain for anesthetics in 2015.

== See also ==
- Traditional Korean medicine
- Kumdang-2
- Neo-Viagra-Y.R.
- Royal Blood-Fresh
