= Vozdukh =

Vozdukh is a Russian word meaning air, and may refer to:

- Vozdukh, a system within the International Space Station Environmental Control and Life Support System, used to remove carbon dioxide from the spacecraft air
- Vozdukh (magazine), a Russian poetry magazine
