= Yakchim =

Korean traditional medicine treatment

- Hangul: 약침
- Hanja: 藥鍼
- RR: yakchim
- MR: yakch'im

Yakchim (Korean: 약침) is one of the many treatments in traditional Korean medicine treatment. It is also called pharmacopuncture, Korean herb acupuncture and acupuncture with medicinal herbs.

== Definition ==
It is also known as Yakchim (藥鍼) Immunization, Suchim (水针), Yakchimyobeop(a method of treatment of Yakchim), Hyeolwi (穴位) needle therapy. It is a type of medical science of Immunity (免疫医学) injecting to the important gyeonghyeol (經穴:Acupuncture points) ingredients extracted from oriental medical herbs.

It can also be said that the therapy of a needle for acupuncture is a method of treatment stimulating the human body externally and the medication therapy is stimulating the internal organs internally. It has an intention of improving the effectiveness of treatment by enforcing the two therapies simultaneously.

In western pharmacodynamic sense, direct injection of medicinal substances into the body promotes quicker steadystate levels of substances either in the local tissue or in the blood stream, thus improving time-efficacy of the medicine (which has been a long concern when treating time-critical patients)

== Background ==
It was developed by Nam Sang Chun(南相千) from South Korea who had researched the formation of kyungrak (=meridians經絡) in 1956 and has strengthened the immunity developing into a specialty of acupuncture field and since 1963 he has examined closely the functioning of kyungrak (=meridians經絡) using a syringe with herbal medication such as sanjoin (酸棗仁), hwanggi (黃芪: Astragalus membranaceus Bunge), ginseng (人蔘) and nokyong (鹿茸: the young antlers of the deer).

It is distinguished that gyeonghyeol (經穴:Acupuncture points) has an effect by itself only with the stimulation of the needle, but can be achieved greater therapeutic effect with the injection of specific medicinal herbs. It is being researched and developed in several countries like South Korea, China and Japan and others, where the oriental therapies are prevalent.

The department of the career of Yakchim has been implemented in the Korean Oriental medicine institute on August 26, 1990 in South Korea and the research and the diffusion about Yakchim( 藥鍼) has been progressing actively.

== Menopausal symptoms ==
In traditional Korean medicine, many menopausal symptoms, such as hot flashes, dry mucosa, sleep disorders, and recurrent urinary tract infections, are regarded as being due to a deficiency of yin in the kidneys. The normal functions of the kidneys in Korean medicine include thermoregulation, sexuality, and water homeostasis. Kidney function may decline with increasing age, and especially during the menopause. Yin is identified with receiving and regenerative elements. The hominis placenta is believed to replenish the yin in the kidneys. Thus, the pharmacopuncture treatment for menopausal symptoms are subcutaneous injections of a human placenta extract into four acupoints (CV4, CV6, and bilateral Ex-BB1).

== See also ==
- Dongui Bogam
- Sasang typology
- Traditional Korean medicine

== Bibliography ==
- Yakchim Association : International Society of Kyungrak Immuno-therapy. ;
