= Kyung-ok-ko =

Traditional multi-herbal medicine used for health improvement

Kyung-ok-ko (Korean: 경옥고), also spelled Gyung-ok-ko, is a traditional multi-herbal medicine used for health improvement.
This herbal medicine is composed of Korean ginseng, Chinese foxglove root, Poria cocos and honey based on the prescription on the Korean traditional medical book Dongeui Bogam, which is recognized as a restorative enforcing the vitality of whole organs, elimination fatigues, anti-exhaustion followed by weariness. Because of the special properties that has no any interferences against any foods, this products has been used by the ancient royal families and the nobles. Especially this product improves the growth of children and helps recovery from the weariness due to illness and stress.

== History ==
- Hong-ssi Jipheombang (홍씨집험방, 洪氏集驗方) by Hong Jun (홍준, 洪遵); introduced as a shincheol ongbang (신철옹방, 申鐵甕方)
- Uiru Unyung (의루원융, 醫壘元戎) by Wang Ho-go (왕호고, 王古好)
- Dangye Simbeop (단계심법, 丹溪心法) by Ju Dan-gye (주단계, 朱丹溪)
- Seongseon Hwarin Simbang (성선활인심방, 腥仙活人心方) by Ju Gwon (주권, 朱權)
- Bonchogang-mok (본초강복, 本草綱目) by Lee Sijin (이시진)
- Jang-ssi Itong (장씨이통) by Jang Sukwan (장석완)

== Ingredients ==
- Panax Ginseng: Ginseng promotes spiritual stability and builds strong body and mind.
- Rehmannia Root: Rehmannia makes human face color healthier through its unique hematinic action.
- Poria cocos: Poria cocos cleans and comforts inside of stomach.
- Honey: Honey decreases body pain through its detoxification function.

== Efficacy ==
- Nourishment and Tonic;
- Weak physical constitution;
- Body exhaustion;
- Anti-fatigue;
- Weakness after disease;
- Anti menopausal disorder;
- Students and brainworkers;
- Lose appetite pregnant women.
