= The Sentimental Chord =

2007 studio album by SG Wannabe

Studio album by SG Wannabe
- Released: April 6, 2007
- Genre: K-pop, R&B
- Language: Korean
- Label: Mnet Media, Poibos
- Producer: Cho Young-chul, Lee Min-soo

SG Wannabe chronology
The Precious History (2006)	The Sentimental Chord (2007)	Story In New York (2007)

Singles from SG Wannabe
- 1. "Arirang" Released: April 6, 2007; 2. "Grace" Released: April 6, 2007

The Sentimental Chord is the fourth Korean studio album by SG Wannabe. The album is notable for containing a rendition of the traditional Korean folk song "Arirang" ("아리랑") that incorporates the playing of classic Korean instruments in the accompanying background track. The Sentimental Chord went to #1 on the RIAK charts and so far, it has sold 195,502 copies in cumulative sales.

Towards the end of the year, The Sentimental Chord won SG Wannabe an Album Daesang prize at the Golden Disk Awards (their second prize after Saldaga) as they reigned as the year's top artist. Selling almost 200,000 copies, the album was the best-selling album of 2007 in Korea.

== Music videos ==
The music video for "Arirang" featured Lee Beom-soo, Ock Joo-hyun, and Lee Sun-kyun. The storyline was set around the Korean War in the 1950s.

The music video for "Stay" featured Ha Seok-jin and Shin Min-hee.

== Track listing ==
No.	Title	Lyrics	Music	Arrangement	Length
1.	"아리랑" ("Arirang")	Ahn Young Min	Cho Young Soo	Cho Young Soo
2.	"은(恩)" ("Grace")
3.	"한여름날의 꿈" ("One Summer Day's Dream", duet with Ock Ju-hyun)	Ahn Young Min	Cho Young Soo	Cho Young Soo
4.	"잊어요" ("Forget It")
5.	"지상에서 영원으로" ("From Now Until Forever")	Min Myung Ki	Min Myung Ki
6.	"가시나무새" ("Thorn Tree Bird")	Ahn Young Min	Cho Young Soo	Cho Young Soo
7.	"I Love You"
8.	"아버지 구두" ("Father's Shoes")	Kim Jin Ho	Seo Jae Ha	Seo Jae Ha
9.	"꽃잎" ("Petal")	Ahn Young Min	Ahn Young Min	Cho Young Soo
10.	"한여름날의 꿈 Part.2" ("One Summer Day's Dream Part.2")	Ahn Young Min	Cho Young Soo	Cho Young Soo
11.	"Stay"		Min Myung Ki
12.	"이별하길 정말 잘했어요" ("It Was Good We Separated")	Yoon Sa Ra	Park Deok Sang	Park Deok Sang
13.	"행복한 사람" ("Happy Person")	Han Sung Ho	Han Sung Ho
14.	"사랑아 잘가" ("Good Bye Love")	Ahn Young Min	Seo Jae Ha, Ahn Young Min

== Awards and achievements ==
- 2007: Album Daesang (Golden Disk Awards)
