= Royal Blood-Fresh =

North Korean alleged medical cure

Royal Blood-Fresh (Korean: 혈궁불로정) is a traditional Korean medicine (Koryo medicine) health supplement derived from soybeans. It is manufactured in North Korea and is the most famous product sold by the North Korean company, Pugang Pharmaceutic.

It is marketed as a "blood purifier" and a preventative against deep-vein thrombosis. It is marketed to foreigners during Air Koryo flights and has been sold at Pyongyang Gwan, a North Korean restaurant in Hanoi, Vietnam. It has been dismissed outside of North Korea as a non-scientific "miracle cure".

In 2017, three Russian nationals were arrested in South Korea for selling North Korean drugs, which included Royal Blood-Fresh, Kumdang-2, and Neo-Viagra-Y.R.

== See also ==
- Tetrodocain
