= Song I-yeong =

Korean astronomer (fl. 17th century)

- Born: 1619
- Died: 1692 or before 1687
- Spouse: Lady Jo (趙氏)
- Children: Song Gyeong-sim (宋慶心); Song Gyeong-yun (宋慶胤); Song Gyeong-yeom (宋慶濂)
- Parents: Song Jeong-su (宋庭修) (father); Lady Gim (金氏) (mother)

Korean name
- Hangul: 송이영
- Hanja: 宋以潁
- RR: Song Iyeong
- MR: Song Iyŏng

Song I-yeong (Korean: 송이영; Hanja: 宋以潁; 1619–?) was a Korean court astronomer of the Joseon dynasty. He invented a weight-powered astronomical clock (possibly the Honcheonsigye) and contributed greatly to the implementation of the Shixian Calendar (from Qing China) in Joseon. He also made systematic observations of two comets.

== Armillary clock ==
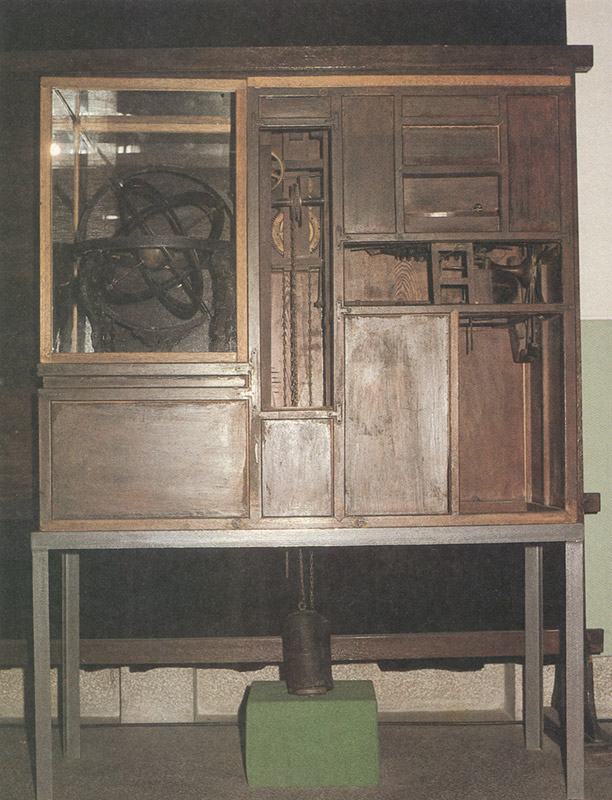
The Honcheonsigye.

In 1659, during the reign of King Hyeonjong, Song I-yeong made an astronomical clock by combining an armillary sphere, long used in East Asia, with the western alarm clock. The result was a device that could both trace the movements of the sun and the moon, as well as display and announce the time.

The clock was repaired in 1687–1688, after which it disappeared from historical records. In the 1930s, Kim Seong-su purchased the honcheonsigye, which is still housed at Korea University. The historian of science Jeon Sang-woon (전상운, 全相運), who examined the device in 1962, assumed that it was Song I-yeong's device, and the British historian of science Joseph Needham adopted this view. However, Gari Ledyard and O Sang-hak (오상학) have separately argued that the object dates from much later.
