= Kumdang-2 =

North Korean alleged medical cure

- Chosŏn'gŭl: 금당 이호 주사약
- Hancha: 金糖二號注射藥
- Revised Romanization: Geumdang-iho jusayak
- McCune–Reischauer: Kŭmdang iho chusayak

Kumdang-2 is an alleged cure for AIDS, Ebola, MERS, Herpes and tuberculosis created in North Korea. According to the website Minjok Tongshin, a version of the drug was originally produced in 1996. The name means "golden sugar" in Korean.

It is manufactured by the Pugang Pharmaceutical Company. According to the Korean Central News Agency, the drug's ingredients include ginseng, small amounts of shungite, and trace amounts of gold and platinum. According to the KCNA, it can also cure cancer, morning sickness, and "harm from the use of computers". The drug was mentioned during the deadly bird flu outbreaks in 2006 and 2013.

== Chemical analysis ==
According to the chemical analysis by the South Korean National Forensic Service, Kumdang-2 turned out to be mostly made of the anesthetic Procaine.

== See also ==
- Koryo medicine
- Neo-Viagra-Y.R.
- Royal Blood-Fresh
- Tetrodocain
