= Korean traditional pharmacist =

Oriental Medicine Pharmacists (Korean: 한약사; Hanja: 韓藥師; RR: hanyaksa) are a licensed healthcare professionals who take charge of various pharmaceutical affairs, like the manufacturing, preparation, identification, storage, importation, sales of drugs and other pharmaceutical technologies in South Korea.

Oriental Medicine Pharmacists practice pharmacy and sell medical and pharmaceutical products, including over-the-counter drugs and work on Korean tranditional medication. Also, some of them work at pharmaceutical companies and government agencies such as Ministry of Food and Drug Safety, controlling the whole drug manufacturing process along with public health administration.

Korean Oriental Pharmacists are placed on the middle ground between Korean traditional medical doctors and general pharmacists. So Oriental Medicine Pharmacists can prepare(dispense) Korean traditional medicine in addition to the jobs of general pharmacists such as running pharmacy and various pharmaceutical affairs.

In order to become a licensed Oriental Medicine Pharmacist, one has to pass a few nationwide Oriental Pharmacist Licensure Examination administered by the government of the South Korea. They must major in Oriental Pharmacy at the undergraduate level of pharmacy school of university to qualify for these exams. They are also required to take the minimum 160 credits; 70 credits of Western medicine and Korean traditional medicine each. As a result, they can become eligible to take the exams after meeting these academic requirements. They take courses on Biochemistry, Organic Chemistry, Immunology and Microbiology, Pharmacognosy, Pharmacology, Pharmaceutics, and so on.

== See also ==
- Pharmacy
- Pharmacist
- Apothecary
- Pharmacology
- Pharmacognosy
- Herbalist
