= The Precious History =

Compilation album by SG Wannabe
- Released: November 15, 2006
- Genre: K-pop
- Language: Korean
- Label: Mnet Media
- Producer: Cho Young-chul, Lee Min-soo

SG Wannabe chronology
The 3rd Masterpiece (2006)	The Precious History (2006)	The Sentimental Chord (2007)

Singles from SG Wannabe
- 1. "Untouchable" Released: December 1, 2005; 2. "Gone With The Wind" Released: December 1, 2005; 3. "Timeless" Released: January 20, 2004; 4. "I Loved You To Death" Released: January 20, 2004; 5. "Sin and Punishment" Released: March 23, 2005; 6. "Saldaga" Released: March 23, 2005; 7. "My Heart's Treasure Chest" Released: September 16, 2005; 8. "Partner for Life" Released: April 8, 2006; 9. "Slowpoke" Released: April 8, 2006; 10. "Song of Love" Released: November 15, 2006

Alternative cover

The Precious History is the greatest hits compilation (and 3.5) studio album by SG Wannabe. SG Wannabe released a greatest hits compilation entitled SG Wannabe Best Album - The Precious History. It was a collection of their favorite songs from the past three albums and also included three new songs. However, despite having high sales and topping the charts, they did not win another, though the group was nominated for Daesang. The album has sold 149,257 copies.

== Music videos ==
They released a music video for the tracks "Song of Love" ("사랑가") featuring Vibe, "Even If I Could See You" ("그저 바라볼 수만 있어도"), and "Ordinary People" featuring Hoo Ni-Hoon, Min Kyung-Hoon, and Jang Hye-Jin. The music video was released in two parts—one for "Ordinary People" and the other for "Song of Love". The music videos starred Lee Beom-soo and former SeeYa member Nam Gyu-ri.

== Track listing ==
=== CD 1 ===
No.	Title	Lyrics	Music	Arrangements	Length
1.	"Timeless" (1st album)	Kang Eun-kyung	Park Geun-tae	Cho Young Soo
2.	"죽을 만큼 사랑했어요" ("I Loved You To Death", 1st album)	Lee Kyung-sub	Lee Kyung-sub	Lee Kyung-sub
3.	"사랑하길 정말 잘했어요" ("It was Good That We Loved", 1st album)	Ahn Young Min	Park Geun-tae, Cho Young Soo	Cho Young Soo
4.	"우습지" ("It's Funny", 1st album)	Han Sung Ho	Han Sung Ho	Han Sung Ho
5.	"금기" ("Taboo", 1st album)	Lee Seung Ho	Yoon Il Sang	Yoon Il Sang
6.	"어린 사랑" ("Young Love", 1st album)	Han Sung Ho	Lee Kyung-sub	Lee Kyung-sub
7.	"그때까지만" ("Until Then", 1st album)	Han Sung Ho	Jung Tae Woo	Jung Tae Woo
8.	"죄와벌" ("Sin and Punishment", 2nd album)	Nam Min Seol	Kim Do-hoon	Kim Do-hoon
9.	"광" ("Craze", 2nd album)	Ahn Young Min	Cho Young Soo	Cho Young Soo
10.	"살다가" ("Saldaga"/"As We Live"/"While You Live", 2nd album)	Ryu Jae Hyun	Ryu Jae Hyun	Ryu Jae Hyun
11.	"Thank You" (2nd album)	Min Myung Ki	Min Myung Ki	Lee Seok Ju, Jung Byung Kyu
12.	"입술만 깨물고 있죠" ("I'm Biting my Lips", 2nd album)	Min Myung Ki	Min Myung Ki	Jung Byung Kyu

=== CD 2 ===
No.	Title	Lyrics	Music	Arrangements	Length
1.	"내 마음의 보석상자" ("My Heart's Treasure Chest", 2.5 album)	Lee Ju Ho	Lee Ju Ho	Cho Young Soo
2.	"꿈의 대화 (R&B Version)" ("A Dreamy Conversation", 2.5 album)	Lee Bum Yong	Lee Bum Yong	Cho Young Soo
3.	"이별아닌 이별" ("A Separation Which Wasn't One", 2.5 album)	Oh Tae Ho	Oh Tae Ho	Kim Tae Hyun (mdrdney)
4.	"사랑과 우정사이" ("Between Love and Friendship", 2.5 album)	Oh Tae Ho	Oh Tae Ho	Seo Jae Ha
5.	"사랑의 썰물" ("Tide of Love", 2.5 album)	Kim Chang Gi	Kim Chang Gi	Cho Young Soo
6.	"내사람: Partner For Life" ("Partner For Life", 3rd album)	Ahn Young Min	Cho Young Soo	Cho Young Soo
7.	"느림보" ("Slowpoke", 3rd album)	Ahn Young Min	Ryu Jae Hyun	Ryu Jae Hyun
8.	"사랑했어요" ("I Loved You", ft. Danny Ahn)	Ahn Young Min	Cho Young Soo	Cho Young Soo
9.	"비익조" ("Bird", 3rd album)	Cho Eun Hee	Shin Sung Mo	Shin Sung Mo, Ahn Ki Deok
10.	"폭풍" ("Storm", 3rd album)	Ahn Young Min	Cho Young Soo	Cho Young Soo
11.	"Wedding" (3rd album)	Min Myung Ki	Min Myung Ki	Lee Seok Ju
12.	"Untouchable" (with Vibe & Kim Jong Kook, Big4 album)	Ahn Young Min	Cho Young Soo	Cho Young Soo
13.	"바람과 함께 사라지다" ("Gone With The Wind", with Kim Jong Wook, Big4 album)	Ryu Jae Hyun	Ryu Jae Hyun	Ryu Jae Hyun

=== CD 3 ===
No.	Title	Length
1.	"사랑가 feat. 윤민수" ("Song of Love feat. Yoon Min Soo of Vibe")
2.	"그저 바라볼수만 있어도" ("Even If I could See You")
3.	"Ordinary People feat. 후니훈, 민경훈 & 장혜진" ("Ordinary People feat. Honey Hoon, Min Kyung Hoon & Jang Hye Jin")
