= Cheongsimhwan =

Pill in traditional Korean medicine

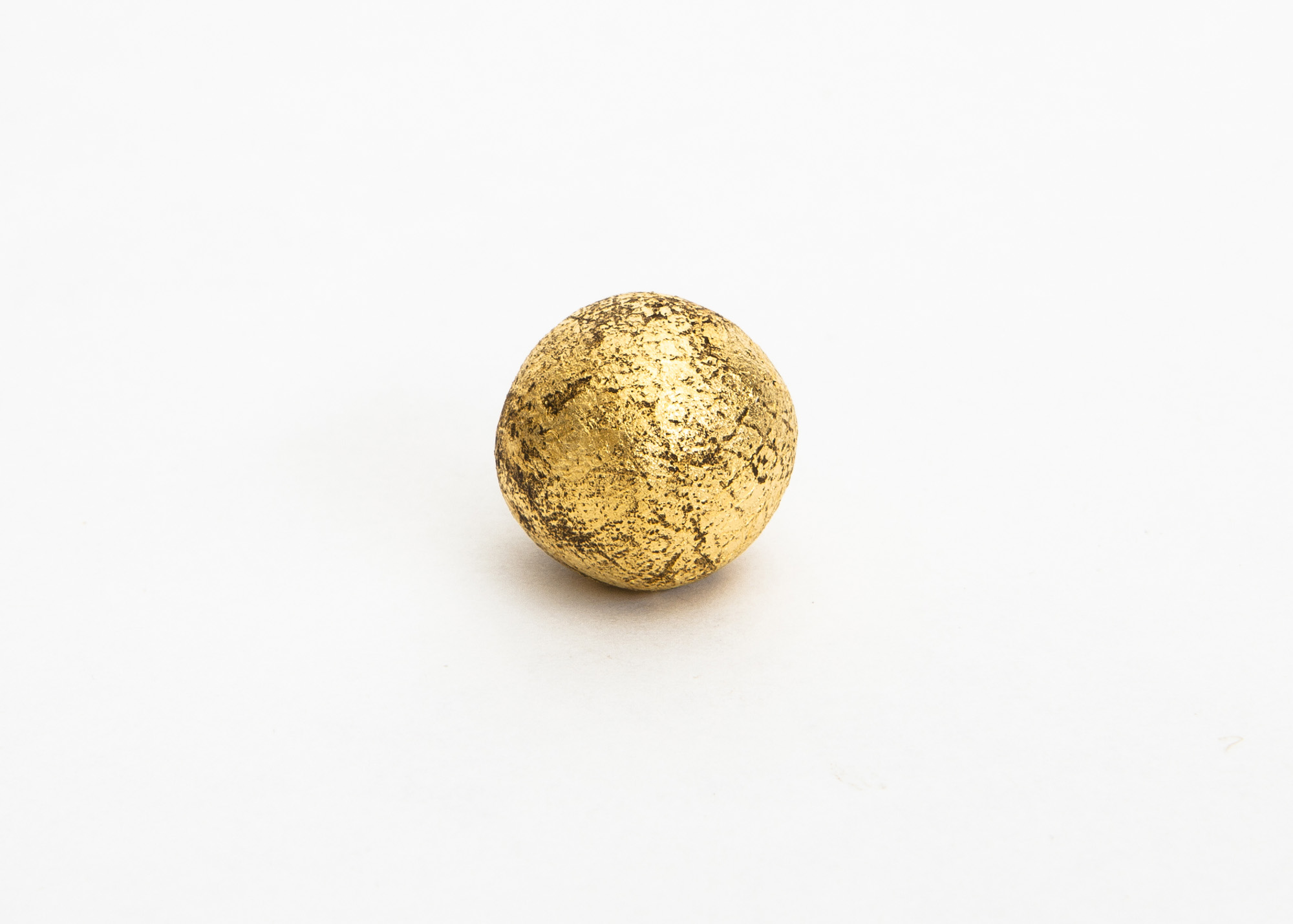

Korean name
- Hangul: 청심환
- Hanja: 淸心丸
- RR: cheongsimhwan
- MR: ch'ŏngsimhwan
- IPA: [tɕʰʌŋ.ɕim.ɦwan]

Alternate name
- Hangul: 우황청심환; 청심원
- Hanja: 牛黃淸心丸; 淸心元
- RR: uhwangcheongsimhwan; cheongsimwon
- MR: uhwangch'ŏngsimhwan; ch'ŏngsimwŏn
- IPA: [u.ɦwaŋ.tɕʰʌŋ.ɕim.ɦwan]; [tɕʰʌŋ.ɕim.wʌn]

Cheongsimhwan (Korean: 청심환, lit. 'clear-mind pill'), also called uhwang-cheongsimhwan (우황청심환) and cheongsimwon (청심원), is a pill formulated with thirty odd herbs and other medicinal ingredients, including calculus bovis, ginseng, musk, and Chinese yam root. It is used to treat various symptoms, such as numb limbs and fit of apoplexy, epilepsy, and others in traditional Korean medicine.
