= Habitus =

Habitus may refer to:

- Habitus (biology), a term commonly used in biology as being less ambiguous than "habit"
- Habitus (sociology), embodied dispositions or tendencies that organize how people perceive and respond to the world around them
- Habitus: A Diaspora Journal
- Habitus, a 1998 novel by James Flint

== See also ==
- Habit (biology)
