= Chiljeongsan =

15th-century Korean astronomical calendar treatise

The Chiljeongsan (Korean: 칠정산; Hanja: 七政算; RR: Chiljeongsan; MR: Ch'ilchŏngsan; "Calculation of the Seven Celestial Bodies") is a Korean treatise on calendar science and astronomy compiled in the 1440s on the orders of King Sejong of Joseon. The "seven celestial bodies" are the sun, the moon and the five planets visible to the naked eye. The work has two parts: the "Inner Volume" (Naepyeon), completed in 1442, and the "Outer Volume" (Oepyeon), completed in 1444.

== Background ==
In 1423, Sejong had his scholars compare and correct the different calendar systems then known in Korea. In 1432 he ordered Jeong In-ji, Jeong Heum-ji and Jeong Cho to study Chinese works on the subject and to write a clear explanation of the Shoushi calendar, devised by Guo Shoujing under the Yuan dynasty. The work took ten years. The astronomers Yi Sun-ji and Kim Dam compiled both volumes, and afterwards they carried out most of the court's calendar calculations.

== Inner Volume ==
The Inner Volume opens with a list of astronomical constants. Seven chapters follow, on the calendar, the sun, the moon, the stars that cross the meridian, eclipses, the five planets and four imaginary bodies used in fortune-telling. At the end are tables of sunrise and sunset times and of the length of day and night, calculated for Seoul. Because it covers the movements of the sun, moon and planets, the book works less like a simple calendar and more like a modern ephemeris.

The book gives the length of the year as 365.2425 days, the same value as the Gregorian calendar. It counts in tens: a day has 100 gak, and each gak has 100 bun. It divides the circle into 365.2575 degrees, one for each day of the sun's yearly path, so that one of its degrees equals about 0.9756 modern degrees.

Two of the four imaginary bodies, Nahu and Gyedo, take their names from the Sanskrit Rahu and Ketu. They are thought to stand for the two points where the moon's path crosses the sun's, which is where eclipses happen.

== Outer Volume ==
The Outer Volume is a study of the Islamic calendar system that had reached China under the Yuan dynasty. Its methods differ sharply from those of the Inner Volume. Following the Greek tradition, it divides the circle into 360 degrees and counts in sixties. It also starts the year at the spring equinox, where the Chinese and Korean calendars started from the winter solstice.

It makes the year 365 days long and adds 31 leap days every 128 years. This gives a year of 365.242188 days, or 365 days, 5 hours, 48 minutes and 45 seconds, which is one second shorter than the modern value and more accurate than the figure in the Inner Volume. Its tables are harder to use, however, because they are arranged by lunar years of about 354 days.

The volume has five chapters, on the sun, the moon, eclipses, the five planets, and the moon's passing in front of planets and stars.

== Copies ==
Both volumes were printed with movable type, the Inner Volume in three books and the Outer Volume in five. Copies are held in the Kyujanggak collection.
