= Elliot Abravanel =

American physician and diet counselor

Elliot D. Abravanel is an American physician and diet counselor, who developed the Body Type system for weight loss and overall wellness. Based on his experience with the "Skinny School" program in the 1970s and 1980s, the Body Type program is described in the book Dr. Abravanel's Body Type Diet and Lifetime Nutrition Plan, first published in 1983.

== The Body Type program ==
The Body Type program asserts that there are four major glands in the human body (pituitary, thyroid, adrenal, and gonadal) and that each individual has one "dominant gland". Ann Louise Gittleman stated that Abravanel developed these ideas as an expansion of speculations by Henry G. Bieler and noted that this was done, "Without directly monitoring the behavior of any gland ..."

== Criticism ==
Abravanel's Body Type system is dismissed by medical health professionals as quackery. Science writer Kurt Butler has written that Abravanel and his wife Elizabeth A. King have presented "no evidence to support their claims that specific foods stimulate specific glands and eventually exhaust them, that each individual has a 'dominant gland' at the root of any weight problem, or that herbal teas help control weight by soothing the errant gland and moderating its cravings. All this is nonsense dressed in scientific-sounding terminology." Dietitian Charlotte Bonds wrote that Abravanel's book "nourishes one of most predominant myths about being overweight" and recommended "leaving it alone".
