= Vozdukh (magazine) =

Russian literary magazine

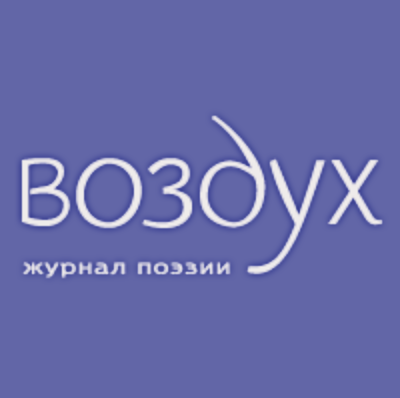
- Editor-in-chief: Dmitry Kuzmin
- Categories: poetry, literary criticism
- Frequency: 4 per year
- Publisher: Argo-Risk
- Founded: 2006
- Country: Russia
- Language: Russian
- ISSN: 1818-8486

Vozdukh is a Russian literary magazine published quarterly which features poetry and critical essays. The editor-in-chief is Dmitry Kuzmin. The designer is Yuri Gordon.

== History ==
The magazine was established in 2006. Its title translates as "air" and refers to a passage from Osip Mandelstam, who viewed genuine poetry as stolen air, which doesn't ask anyone's permission to exist.
