= Hŏ Chun =

Korean physician (1539–1615)

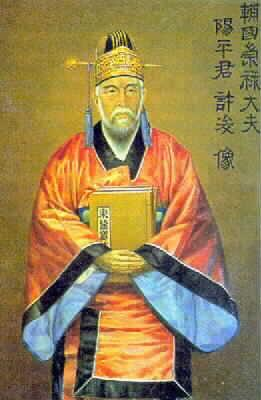

Korean name
- Hangul: 허준
- Hanja: 許浚
- RR: Heo Jun
- MR: Hŏ Chun

Art name
- Hangul: 구암
- Hanja: 龜巖
- RR: Guam
- MR: Kuam

Courtesy name
- Hangul: 청원
- Hanja: 淸源
- RR: Cheongwon
- MR: Ch'ŏngwŏn

Hŏ Chun (Korean: 허준; 1539 – October 9, 1615) was a Korean physician who served as the royal chief physician of the Naeuiwon during the reigns of King Seonjo (r. 1567–1608) and King Gwanghaegun (r. 1608–1623) of the Korea dynasty.

== Biography ==
=== Childhood and youth ===
Hŏ Chun was born in 1539 in what is now the Gangseo District of Seoul. He was a member of the Yangcheon Heo clan, a wealthy military family. Because his mother was a concubine, he was classified as a chungin rather than a full member of the Yangban class, limiting his social standing and opportunities.

At the time, chungin were considered technical experts and administrators, ranking below the yangban in the social hierarchy. Hŏ may have chosen medicine because his birth status made a career as a civil or military officer unlikely. A popular folktale tells that he apprenticed with a healer after saving a child thought to be beyond help. When his mentor rebuked him for interfering with fate, Hŏ left the apprenticeship.

The folklore story goes on to say that Hŏ later treated a sick princess in China. On his way there, he rescued an injured tiger. The grateful tiger gave him a whetstone, acupuncture needles, and a cloth said to restore life. When he reached the palace, he found the princess transformed into a snake below the waist. That night, his former teacher appeared in a dream to show him how to heal her.

=== Career progression ===
At twenty-nine, Hŏ Chun became a court physician. Three years later, he began working at Naeŭiwŏn, the royal clinic, where his skill led to rapid advancement. In 1575, he treated King Seonjo and in 1590 he was promoted after curing the Crown Prince of smallpox.

During the Japanese invasions from 1592 to 1598, Hŏ stayed with King Seonjo when many officials fled. His loyalty and another successful treatment of the Crown Prince earned him a senior second rank in 1596.

In 1600, he was named chief physician at Naeuiwon, the palace infirmary and pharmacy. The king asked him to write a medical book for ordinary people that would cover preventive care, drug formulas, and simple treatments. Scholars regard this work as an early public health manual in Joseon Korea.

After King Seonjo’s death in 1608, Hŏ was accused of involvement in the king’s death and sent into exile in Ulju. The following year, King Gwanghaegun restored him to office. In 1610, he completed the twenty-five volumes of Donguibogam, a medical encyclopedia written over about fifteen years. He taught new physicians at Naeuiwon until his death in 1615.

=== Post-death and legacy ===
Hŏ Chun’s writings influenced late Joseon court physicians and scholars. He combined Confucian, Taoist, and empirical methods and used Hangul to explain treatments so that commoners could understand them.

Although his chungin status limited his acceptance at court, after his death was granted the Senior First Rank Officer title in recognition of his work.

His life and methods are taught today in traditional Korean medicine programs at Kyung Hee University and Dongguk University.

The Heo Jun Museum opened in the Gangseo District of Seoul in 2005. It displays his original texts and Joseon-era medical artifacts. Each year, the museum holds a festival celebrating his contributions to Korean medicine and culture.

== Contribution to medicine ==
He wrote several medical texts, but his most noted achievement is Donguibogam ("Mirror of Eastern Medicine"), which is considered a defining text of traditional Korean medicine that contributed to the expansion of Korean medicine utilisation among the general public. This work spread throughout East Asian countries like China, Japan, and Vietnam, where it is regarded as a classic of Oriental medicine.

It is divided into five chapters: "Internal Medicine", "External Medicine", "Miscellaneous Diseases", "Remedies", and "Acupuncture". In "Internal Medicine", Hŏ describes the interdependence of the liver, lungs, kidney, heart, and spleen. "External Medicine" explains how the skin, muscles, blood vessels, tendons, and bones function. "Miscellaneous Diseases" describes the symptoms, diagnoses, and treatment methods for various ailments. Hŏ's remedies often rely on medicinal herbs and provide detailed instructions on extraction, maintenance, and consumption. The final chapter explains methods of acupuncture. In addition to providing medical knowledge, the text reflects the philosophy of seventeenth-century East Asia.

As a royal physician, Hŏ Chun published 10 books:

1. Naeui Sunsaen An (The List of Royal Physicians, 內醫先生案, 1605)
2. Unhae Taesan Jipyo (Compilation of the Essentials on Obstetrics with Korean Translations, 諺解胎産集要, 1607)
3. Unhae Gugeupbang (Formulas for Emergencies with Korean Translations, 諺解救急方, 1608)
4. Unhae Duchang Jipyo (Compilation of the Essentials on Smallpox with Korean Translations, 諺解痘瘡集要, 1608)
5. Dongui Bogam (Treasured Mirror of Eastern Medicine, 東醫寶鑑, 1610)
6. Chando Banglon Magkyul Jipseong (Compilation of Formulas, Doctrines, Pulse-taking, and Rhymes Redacted and Illustrated, 纂圖方論脈訣集成, 1612)
7. Shinchan Byukonbang (Newly Compiled Formulas to Ward off Epidemics, 新纂辟瘟方, 1613)
8. Byukyeok Shinbang (Divine Formulas to Ward off Epidemics, 辟疫神方, 1613)
9. Napyak Jeungchi Bang (End-of-the Year Medicines, 臘藥症治方)
10. Yukdae Uihak Sungshi (Names of Physicians Throughout History, 歷代醫學姓氏)

These books were used in academic and administrative contexts within the palace and by those studying medicine at the time.

Although Hŏ Chun served extensively within the royal court, he sought to make medical treatment methods accessible and comprehensible to ordinary people. Whereas much common medical knowledge and most court physicians emphasized the rarity and expense of ingredients, Hŏ promoted the use of natural herbal remedies that were readily available to commoners in Korea. Moreover, he recorded the names of herbs in simple hangul rather than in the more complex hanja(Chinese characters), which most commoners could not read. In recognition of its cultural and historical significance, Donguibogam was inscribed on UNESCO’s Memory of the World Register in 2009.

== Family ==
- Grandfather
  - Hŏ Kŏn (허곤; 許琨) (경상도우수사)
- Father
  - Hŏ Ryun (허륜)
- Mother
  - Lady Kim of the Yeonggwang Kim clan (영광 김씨)
- Brothers
  - Older half-brother: Hŏ Ok (허옥; 許沃)
  - Younger half-brother: Hŏ Ching (허징; 許徵) (b. 1549)
- Wife
  - Lady Kim of the Andong Kim clan (정경부인 안동 김씨)
- Son
  - Hŏ Kyŏm (허겸; 許謙) (파릉군; 巴陵君)

== In popular culture ==
=== Film and television ===
- Portrayed by Kim Mu-saeng in the 1975 MBC TV series Jibnyeom.
- Portrayed by Lee Soon-jae in the 1976 film Jibnyeom.
- Portrayed by Seo In-seok in the 1991 MBC TV series Dongui Bogam.
- Portrayed by Jun Kwang-ryul in the 1999–2000 MBC TV series Hur Jun.
- Portrayed by Kim Joo-hyuk and Kang Han-byeol in the 2013 MBC TV series Hur Jun, the Original Story.
- Portrayed by Yoon Shi-yoon and Kim Kap-soo in the 2016 JTBC TV series Mirror of the Witch.
- Portrayed by Um Hyo-sup in the 2017 tvN TV series Live Up to Your Name.

=== Literature ===
- The novel Dongui Bogam by Lee Eun-seong was published in 1990 and became a bestseller.

== See also ==
- Heojun Museum
- Dongui Bogam
- UNESCO's Memory of the World Programme
