= Story In New York =

Studio album by SG Wannabe
- Released: November 27, 2007
- Genre: K-pop
- Language: Korean
- Label: Mnet Media
- Producers: Kwon Chang-hyun, Kim Do-hoon

SG Wannabe chronology
The Sentimental Chord (2007)	Story In New York (2007)	My Friend (2008)

Singles from SG Wannabe
- 1. "First Snow" Released: November 26, 2007

Story In New York is the 4.5 studio album by SG Wannabe. The album contains 12 tracks with a total running time of approximately 51 minutes. It was released as a special winter album, a format common in Korean popular music for seasonal releases between full studio albums. The title track "First Snow" was written by Cho Young Soo and Ahn Young Min, the duo's regular songwriting collaborators, and describes missing an ex-lover on a snowy day. The track reached number 3 on the Soompi weekly chart in the week of January 21, 2008, following SG Wannabe's win of the DaeSang at the Golden Disk Awards.

== Music video ==
Two versions of the music video for "First Snow". SG Wannabe member, Chae Dong Ha, was featured as the male lead in the music video. The other two members, Kim Yong Yun and Kim Jin Ho were also featured in the music video.

A music video for "A Christmas Story" was also released and featured all three SG Wannabe members.

== Notable tracks ==
=== "Three Letters" ===
"Three Letters" originally appeared in Princess Lulu OST in 2005 and was performed by M to M.

=== "First Snow" ===
"First Snow" is the title track of this album.

=== "A Christmas Story" ===
"A Christmas Story" is a nice mellow ballad track.

== Track listing ==
No.	Title	Lyrics	Music	Arrangements	Length
1.	"첫눈" ("First Snow")	Ahn Young Min	Cho Young Soo	Cho Young Soo
2.	"들어주세요" (Listen To Me)	Kim Jin Ho	Kim Do-hoon	Lee Sang Ho
3.	"크리스마스 이야기" ("A Christmas Story")	Ahn Young Min	Cho Young Soo	Cho Young Soo
4.	"한여름날의 꿈" ("One Summer Day's Dream", duet with Ock Ju-hyun, 4th album)	Ahn Young Min	Cho Young Soo	Seo Jae Ha
5.	"세글자" ("Three Letters")	Kang Eun Kyung	Park Geun-tae	Shin Min
6.	"하지만" ("But")	Cho Young Soo	Cho Young Soo	Le Seok Ju, Jung Chang-ock
7.	"그래도" ("Even Though")	Kim Jin Ho	Cho Young Soo	Lee Sang Ho
8.	"Holiday (원곡: "사랑아 잘가")" ("Holiday: (From the song: "Good Bye Love")")	Ahn Young Min	Ahn Young Min	Hong Jun Ho
9.	"사랑한다 말해줘" ("Tell Me You Love Me")	Jo Eun Hee	Park Geun-tae	PJ
10.	"은" ("Grace", 4th album)	Kim Do-hoon, Nam Min Sul, PJ	Kim Do-hoon, PJ	Lee Hyun Seung
11.	"가시리" ("Will Leave", with KCM)	Ahn Young Min	Cho Young Soo	PJ
12.	"지상에서 영원으로" ("From Now Until Forever")	Min Myung Ki	Min Myung Ki	Park Dong Kyu
