= Habitus: A Diaspora Journal =

Habitus: A Diaspora Journal was a semiannual Jewish magazine of international literature and culture. It was founded by Joshua Ellison, who was also editor.

Each issue of the magazine was dedicated to writing about a different city, and featured Jewish writers alongside non-Jewish voices. The magazine's mission statement begins:

"Habitus is a Jewish magazine that takes the whole world seriously. Our starting point is international Jewry; but this is only the beginning of a far-reaching inquiry that seeks to capture a profoundly modern viewpoint that is both expansive and inclusive. Habitus takes its shape from the elusive concept known as the Diaspora – that untidy mix of longing and belonging, past and place. It represents an experience that is both personal and universal. The Diaspora condition confounds and consumes, even as it touches more and more lives around the globe. This thematic thread will speak to contemporary readers – of all backgrounds – who feel the pull of complex identities and biographies, and who wrestle with what it means to be truly at home."

According to a feature in The Forward by staff writer Nathan Popper, Habitus' "operating premise is that the relation of Jews to their far-flung homes — in places like Buenos Aires and Sarajevo and New Orleans — has a great deal to tell us not only about Jewish life but also about the modern experience with all its dislocation and movement." The magazine was funded by the Dorot Foundation.

The journal's debut issue in the fall of 2006 was dedicated to Budapest. The second issue, released in June 2007, was dedicated to Sarajevo. Further issues featured Buenos Aires, New Orleans, Moscow, Mexico City and Berlin. The last issue was published in January 2012 and dedicated to New York City.

In March 2011, a digital anthology with a selection of contributions from the first six issues was published.

In December 2013, the magazine announced it would not continue publishing issues.

Some of the journal's contributors include George Konrad, Aleksandar Hemon, Semezdin Mehmedinović, David Rieff, Ágnes Heller, Peter Zilahy, Courtney Angela Brkic, George Szirtes, Jorge Luis Borges Zafer Şenocak, André Aciman, Meena Alexander and Michael Arad.
