= Sasang constitutional medicine =

School of Korean traditional medicine

The Sasang constitutional medicine (Korean: 사상의학; Hanja: 四象醫學) or Sasang typology is a typological constitution medicine within traditional Korean medicine. It was systematized by Yi Je-ma in his book Dongyi Suse Bowon: Longevity and Life Preservation in Eastern Medicine (동의수세보원, 東醫壽世保元) in 1894. It is a branch of the yin-yang theory. It divides people into four body types based on their biopsychosocial traits and their nature of strong and weak organs. The classification was derived from the five body types of Traditional Chinese medicine described in an ancient Chinese medical book Lingshu Jing of Huangdi Neijing.

== Classification system ==
Sasang typology divides people into four types based on their biopsychosocial traits with a combination of yin/yang and greater/lesser: tae-yang ( 태양, 太陽) or "greater yang"; so-yang (소양, 小陽) or "lesser yang"; tae-eum (태음, 太陰) or "greater yin"; and so-eum (소음, 小陰) or "lesser yin". In the yin-tang theory it suggests a duality, two complete opposite energies that need each other in order to exists, for example to wake up we need to sleep and viceversa, for the day to come out we need the night to fall and viceversa. In sa sang it divides it into four which doubles the precision. A clear example is the day and night but in between there is the evening and morning.

Each type consists of a classification of pathology, medicine and hygiene depending on personality, psychological status and organ functionality. It is considered that one cannot escape the category of biological body type, and the strengths and weaknesses of organs, both major and minor, depend on the type.

== Body Types ==
=== Tae-yang ===
Tae-yang have large lungs and a small liver. They have superiority in function, and often have feelings of inferiority.

=== Tae-eum ===
Tae-eum have a large liver and small lungs. They are tall and the majority gain a lot of weight. They are patient and have a reserved personality. Therefore, if they are given a task, they will not give up, no matter what task it is. Because of this personality, they are prone to gambling.

=== So-yang ===
The so-yang type has a large spleen, and small kidneys. They have whitish skin. Like so-eum, many of this type are skinny.

=== So-eum ===
The so-eum type have large kidneys and a small spleen. They are short, and many are skinny. Due to weak intestines, they very often have digestive problems. Many enjoy a meat diet.

== Objective ==
Sa-sang medicine explains illnesses such as eczema, allergies etc., as an imballance of the body, for example: Soeum type has strong kidney but weak stomach and if the Soeum type consumes foods that strengthen the kidneys but not foods that strengthen the stomach an imabllance of energy (yin-yang) is caused. Its objective is to restore balance and make perfect equilibrium.
