= Korea Pugang Corporation =

North Korean conglomerate company

- Hangul: 조선부강회사
- Hanja: 朝鮮富强會社
- RR: Joseon Bugang hoesa
- MR: Chosŏn Pugang hoesa

Korea Pugang Corporation (Korean: 조선부강회사) is a North Korean holding company founded in 1979.

== Subsidiaries ==
The companies produce metal, machinery, minerals, chemicals, electric lines, construction material, electricity, and food products. KPC controls 9 subsidiary companies:

- Pugang trading corporation (부강무역회사)
- Pugang Electronics (부강전자회사)
- Pugang Hwangchiryong company (부강황치령회사, also known as 부강샘물회사, which deals with bottled water from Hwangchiryong territory)
- Pugang pharmaceutical company (부강제약회사)
- Pugang motorcycle company (부강오토바이회사)
- Pugang Natural products company (부강천연제품회사)
- Pugang glass products company (부강유리제품회사, also known as 부강구슬회사)
- Korea Pugang Coins Corp (부강주화회사, that produces commemorative coins)
- Korea Pugang Mining and Machinery Corporation ltd (조선부강광산기계회사).

== Pugang pharmaceutical company ==
Pugang Pharmaceutic Company (Korean: 부강제약회사; 富强製藥會社) is a pharmaceutical company founded in 1983. It is operated by North Korea's Ministry of Public Health. Although the company had its assets frozen as a result of U.S. sanctions, its products are sold internationally by Lekar Korea, a distributor based in Russia.

Products sold by the company are mostly traditional Korean medicine ("Koryo medicine" in North Korea) supplements combined with high-technology products. These products include Royal Blood-Fresh, and Kumdang-2. Many health claims made by the company have been dismissed as non-scientific outside of North Korea.

== Pugang motorcycle company ==
The company produced the 124cc motorcycle "PugangCM125" in 2005.

== Korea Pugang Coins Corp ==
The Korea Pugang Coins Corp has been minting coins since 1987.

== Advertisements ==
The corporation was advertised by Jo Myung-Ae for a period.
