= Péter Zilahy =

Péter Zilahy (born 1970 in Budapest) is a Hungarian writer and performer whose prose and poetry has been widely translated and who has often used photography, interactive media and performance art in his work.

== Literary work ==
Zilahy's book of poems, Statue Under White Sheet, Ready to Jump (Lepel alatt ugrásra kész szobor) was published in 1993.

His play, Der lange Weg nach nebenan (A hosszú út közelre), has been performed at the Volksbühne Berlin.

His dictionary novel The Last Window-Giraffe (Az utolsó ablakzsiráf) was published in 1998 and has since been translated into 27 languages. He has had exhibitions at the Ludwig Museum Budapest and the Akademie Schloss Solitude in Germany.

=== The Last Window-Giraffe ===
The Last Window-Giraffe is a memoir about the absurdity of everyday life under a dictatorship. It is written in the style of an actual Hungarian children's dictionary, The Window-Giraffe (in the Hungarian version of this A to Z, Ablak=Window is the first item and Zsiráf=Giraffe is the last). The dictionary explained the whole world in simple words, where everything was in order and problems were always solved.

The Last Window-Giraffe also recounts the events of the Belgrade protests of 1996-97, which it describes as being symbolic of protests everywhere in their courage and absurdity. The novel is filled with Zilahy's own photographs, and is an insight into the world behind the Iron Curtain.

Reviews of this work have appeared in the FAZ, The Independent, the Neue Zürcher Zeitung, The Telegraph, and Die Welt.

=== Journalistic work ===
Zilahy has written for many journalistic outlets, including The Guardian, the New York Times, and The Frankfurter Allgemeine Zeitung.

== Other work ==
Zilahy was editor-in-chief of Link Budapest, an Internet magazine for contemporary literature in English and Hungarian, until 1999. He was also the editor-in-chief of The World Literature Series.

Mr. Zilahy has held a wide range of artistic and literary residencies, including a stay at the John W. Kluge Center of the Library of Congress. He is currently Writer-at-Large at the Slought Foundation at UPenn, a year-long honorary affiliation.
