= Yi Je-ma =

Korean physician (1837–1900)

- Hangul: 이제마
- Hanja: 李濟馬
- RR: I Jema
- MR: I Chema

Yi Je-ma (1837–1900) was a Korean medicine scholar in Late Joseon period.

He wrote a book Dongyi Suse Bowon: Longevity and Life Preservation in Eastern Medicine (동의수세보원; 東醫壽世保元) in 1894. The book is about constitution of people. He claimed that because each person's natural constitution is different, the same disease must be treated differently.

== Biography ==
Yi was born as a love child of Jinsa Yi Ban-Oh. As his family was prominent in Hamhung, Yi was able to receive education of sinology, however it was impossible for him to overcome the restrictions of class. Yi wanted to attend the military examination of Gwageo and become a military officer. But, he started his study for diseases as he often suffered from inveterate illness.

== Choronology of Yi Je-ma ==
- 1837(Birth) lunar calendar 03/19(solar calendar 04/23) be born in Hamheung, Hamgyeong-do.
- 1849(13 years old) 부친과 조부가 모두 운명하자 집을 떠나 전국 각지를 유랑.
- 1872년(36세) 무과에 병과 급제.
- 1873년(40세) 무위별선군관(武衛別選軍官)에 임명.
- 1880년(44세) 《격치고(格致藁)》를 집필하기 시작함.
- 1886년(50세) 진해현감(鎭海縣監)에 임명.
- 1894년(58세) 《동의수세보원》을 저술함.
- 1895년(59세) 모친의 병 때문에 함흥으로 낙향.
- 1896년(60세) 정삼품 통정대부 선유위원(正三品 通政大夫 宣諭委員)의 작위를 받음.
- 1897년(61세) 고원군수(高原郡守)에 임명. 《제중신편(濟衆新編)》을 저술.
- 1898년(62세) 관직을 사양하고 고향으로 내려와 보원국(保元局)이라는 한의원을 개설하여 진료와 의학연구에 전념.
- 1900년(64세) 일생을 마감할 때 《동의수세보원》을 개정. 음력 9월 21일(양력 11월 12일)에 작고함.

== Works of Yi Je-ma ==
- Dongyi suse bowon (동의수세보원; 東醫壽世保元)

== Popular culture ==
- Portrayed by Choi Soo-jong in the 2002 KBS TV series Man of the Sun, Lee Je-ma.
