= Honcheonsigye =

Joseon-era astronomical clock

- Hangul: 혼천시계
- Hanja: 渾天時計
- RR: Honcheonsigye
- MR: Honch'ŏnsigye

The Honcheonsigye (Korean: 혼천시계; Hanja: 渾天時計; lit. 'armillary clock') is an astronomical clock made by Song Yi-Yeong (송이영; 宋以潁), a professor of Gwansanggam (관상감; 觀象監) (one of the scientific institution of Joseon) in 1669. It was designated as South Korean national treasure number 230 on August 9, 1985.

The clock used the alarm clock technology created by Christiaan Huygens in 1657. This relic shows that Huygens' technology was spread to East Asia in just 12 years. Also, It demonstrates the astronomy and mechanical engineering technology of the Joseon Dynasty.

The clock has an armillary sphere with a diameter of 40 cm. The sphere is activated by a clockwork mechanism, designed to display the position of the heavens at any given time, as well as displaying the hours and marking their passage with a chiming bell. The device is no longer in working order.

The clock is owned by Korea University Museum. It is the only remaining astronomical clock from the Joseon period.

The clock was purchased from an antiques dealer some time before WWII by Mr Kim Seong-su 김성수 金性洙, the rich businessman and politician who founded Korea University. The historian of science Jeon Sang-Woon 전상운 全相運, who examined the device in 1962, assumed that it was the clockwork driven sphere known to have been made by Song Yiyeong 송이영 宋以穎 in 1669 for King Hyeonjong of Joseon 현종 顯宗, and the British historian of science Joseph Needham adopted this view, giving a detailed citation of the relevant Korean texts from that period, and a detailed description of the mechanism.

However, the historian of Korean cartography, Gary Ledyard, argued that this device could not have been made as early as 1669, since the names given on the map of the earth on the terrestrial globe at the centre of the object shows a name for part of the southern continent that could not have been known in Korea at that period.

More recently, O Sanghag 오상학 has argued that the object may date from as late as the beginning of the 19th century, in the time of Crown Prince Ikjong 익종 翼宗 (1809–1830), before the prince became regent in 1827.

An image of the clock's sphere is shown on the reverse of the 2007 issued 10,000 won banknotes.

== See also ==
- History of astronomy
- National treasures of South Korea
