= Donguibogam =

1613 Korean medical book

- Dongui Bogam
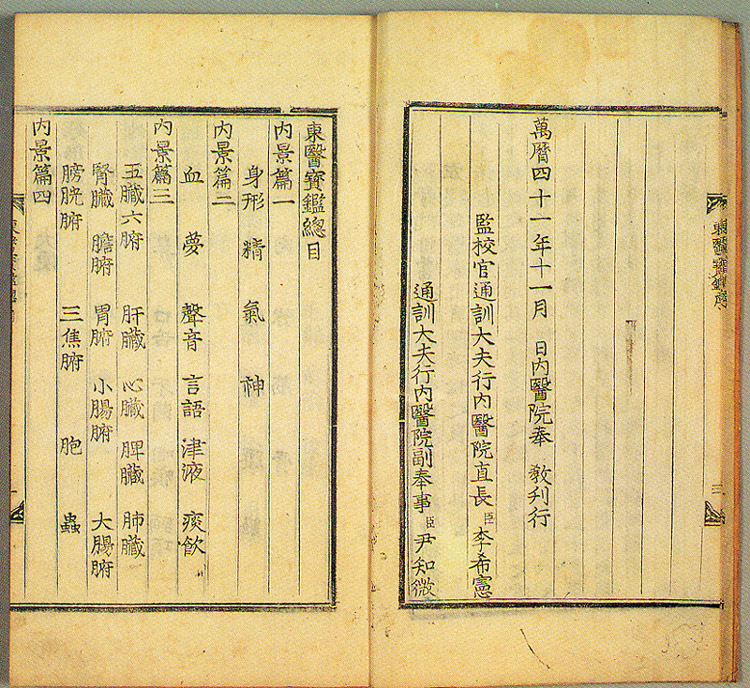
- Table of contents of the book

Dongui Bogam
- Hangul: 동의보감
- Hanja: 東醫寶鑑
- RR: Donguibogam
- MR: Tongŭibogam

The Dongui Bogam (Korean: 동의보감; translated as "Principles and Practice of Eastern Medicine") is a Korean book compiled by the royal physician, Heo Jun and was first published in 1613 during the Joseon period of Korea.

The book is regarded as important in traditional Korean medicine, and is one of the classics of Oriental medicine today. In July 2009, it was added to UNESCO’s Memory of the World International Register. The original edition of Dongui Bogam is currently preserved by the Korean National Library. The original was written in Hanja and only part of it was transcribed in Korean for wide reading use, as only officials understood in Hanmun. It was translated to English in 2013.

== Name ==
The title literally translates as "A Precious Mirror of Eastern Medicine". The phrase "Precious Mirror" (보감 寶鑑) is a metaphorical idiom meaning 'something which can be modeled after'. Meanwhile, the phrase "Eastern Medicine" (동의 東醫) is not the antonym to 'Western Medicine'; "Dongguk" (동국 東國), meaning "Eastern Country," was one of the names of Korea, which means the country to the east of China. Therefore, the title can be rendered as "An Exemplary Explanation of Korean Medicine" and is listed in UNESCO Memory of the World as "Principles and Practice of Eastern Medicine".

== Background ==
Known as one of the classics in the history of Eastern medicine, it was published and used in many countries including China and Japan, and remains a key reference work for the study of Eastern medicine. Its categorization and ordering of symptoms and remedies under the different human organs affected, rather than the disease itself, was a revolutionary development at that time. It contains insights that in some cases did not enter the medical knowledge of Europe until the twentieth century.

Work on the Dongui Bogam started in the 29th year of King Seonjo's reign (1596) by the main physicians of Naeuiwon (내의원, "royal clinic"), with the objective to create a comprehensive compilation of traditional medicine. Main physician Heo Jun led the project, but work was interrupted due to the second Japanese invasion of Korea in 1597. King Seonjo did not see the project come to fruition, but Heo Jun steadfastedly stuck to the project and finally completed the work in 1610, the 2nd year of King Gwanghaegun's reign.

It "synthesized 2000 years of traditional medical knowledge" from Korea and China, and included Taoist, Buddhist, and Confucian ideas.

== The book ==
The Dongui Bogam consists of 25 volumes. In contrast to Hyangyak jipseongbang (향약집성방, "Compilation of Native Korean Prescriptions"), written in 1433, Dongui Bogam is more systematic. It not only refers to Korean medicinal texts, but also Chinese medicinal texts, and records illnesses practically with their respective remedies.

=== Contents ===
The book is divided into 5 chapters: Naegyeongpyeon (내경편, 内景篇, Internal Medicine), Oehyeongpyeon (외형편, 外形篇, External Medicine), Japbyeongpyeon (잡병편, 難病編, Miscellaneous Diseases), Tangaekpyeon (탕액편, 湯液編, Remedies), and Chimgupyeon (침구편, 鍼灸編, Acupuncture), respectively.

- Naegyeongpyeon primarily deals with physiologic functions and equivalent disorders of internal organs. The interactions of five organs - liver, lungs, kidneys, heart, and spleen - are thoroughly explained.
- Oehyeongpyeon explains the function of visible parts of the human body - skin, muscles, blood vessels, tendons, and bones - and the various related illnesses.
- Japbyeongpyeon deals with diagnosis and healing methods of various illnesses and disorders such as anxiety, over-excitement, stroke, cold, nausea, edema, jaundice, carbunculosis, and others. This chapter also has a section for pediatrics and gynecology.
- Tangaekpyeon details methods for creating remedies and medical potions such as the collection of medicinal herbs and plants, creating and handling of medication, correct prescription and administration of medicine. All herbal medicine is categorized with explanations regarding their strength, gathering period and their common names for easy understanding.
- Chimgupyeon explains the acupuncture procedures for various ailments and disorders.

Dongui Bogam offered not only medical facts, but also philosophical values of Eastern Asia. Heo Jun conveyed the message that maintaining the body's energies in balance leads to one's good health. The first page of the book is an anatomical map of the human body, linking human body with heaven and earth which embodies the Asian perspective of nature.

=== Editions ===
There have been several print editions of Dongui Bogam besides the original Naeuiwon edition, within Korea and abroad. The first Chinese edition was printed in 1763 with additional prints in 1796, and 1890. The Japanese edition was first printed in 1724, and then 1799.

== UNESCO Memory of the World Register and controversy ==
In 2009, UNESCO decided to add Dongui Bogam to the cultural heritage list due to its contribution as a historical relic and it was placed on UNESCO’s Memory of the World International Register, becoming Korea's seventh cultural heritage to be thus included. However, doctors clashed over Dongui Bogam after the official listing. The Korean Medical Association (KMA) downplayed the book's importance saying that "it shouldn’t be taken as anything more than a recognition of the book's value as a historical relic. It should not be taken as an acknowledgement of traditional medicine for its superior effectiveness", saying that the book is full of quackery such as how to bear a son or how to make yourself invisible. The KMA emphasized that Dongui Bogam was merely a cultural artifact and not science. The Association of Korean Oriental Medicine (AKOM) criticized the doctors of KMA for the lack of their appreciation of the influence of Dongui Bogam and history, saying it is necessary "to inherit and advance traditional medicine".

== See also ==
- Heo Jun
- Traditional Korean medicine
