= Treason case of Chŏng Yŏrip =

Political purge in Korea

The Treason case of Chŏng Yŏrip in 1589, known in Korean as the Kich'uk oksa (기축옥사, 己丑獄事), was one of the bloodiest political purges in Korea's Joseon Dynasty. Its scale was greater than all four of the notorious literati purges combined. At that time Joseon politics was dominated by conflict between Eastern and Western factions. Neo-Confucian scholar and Easterner, Chŏng Yŏrip was accused of high treason, after which as many as 1,000 Easterners were killed or exiled. (Oksa means a major case involving high treason in Korean, and there were several events named oksa during the Joseon period.)

There is still much dispute about the Treason Case of 1589 because there is a wealth of conflicting historical accounts written by both factions. In the Annals of Joseon Dynasty, the official royal record of the Joseon Dynasty, the Seonjo Annals were written by the Easterners (who held power in Gwanghaegun's reign during which it was written) while the Revised Seonjo Annals were written by the Westerners who later seized power with a coup d'état that placed Injo on throne. In the Narratives of Yŏllyŏsil (연려실기술; 燃藜室記述; Yŏllyŏsil kisul), an unofficial history compiled by Yi Kŭng'ik (이긍익; 李肯翊) much later, Yi included accounts of the both sides and marked them in different colors to identify them as such.

== Sarim's division ==
During King Seonjo's reign, the Sarim scholars following the Kim Chong-jik's school of Neo-Confucianism seized power after long period of persecution and purges. However, generational difference soon emerged within the Sarim faction - older generation who entered politics during predecessor Myeongjong's reign and younger generation who became officials during Seonjo's time. Their difference was reflected in their attitude toward Sim Ŭigyŏm, Myeongjong's brother-in-law. The Sarim tended to regard the king's maternal relatives as corrupting influence on the court and best to be excluded from politics. But the older generation, which came to be called the Westerners because Sim's house was on the west of the palace, supported Sim for being Yi Hwang's disciple and protecting them from yet another purge of Sarim that had been planned by his uncle. However, the younger generation, called Easterners because its leader Kim Hyowŏn's house was on the east of the palace, regarded Sim and older Sarim officials as partly responsible for excesses of Myeongjong's reign, which was notorious for corruption and abuse by Yun Wŏnhyŏng, Myeong's maternal uncle. Philosophically, Easterners tended to be followers of Yi Hwang and Jo Shik while the Westerners followed Yi I and Seong Hun.

This division was soon brought into open conflict, mainly due to a personal grudge between Sim and Kim. When a key position in the Ministry of Personnel became vacant and Kim was recommended by the former office holder, Sim opposed Kim's appointment claiming that Kim was Yun Wŏnhyŏng's hanger-on. There could be no greater insult to a Sarim scholar. Kim, who was nevertheless appointed to the position, later opposed Sim's younger brother being appointed to the same position as his successor. Yi I attempted to prevent the factional split by appointing Sim Ŭigyŏm and Kim Hyowŏn to provincial posts away from the court and tried to arrange a truce between Easterner Yi Pal and Westerner Chŏng Ch'ŏl. After Yi I's death, however, the conflict between two factions became more intense as the Easterners impeached Sim Ŭigyŏm, leading to his dismissal, and gained the upper hand.

== Chŏng Yŏrip's "revolt" ==
As Easterners began to take key positions, Chŏng Yŏrip changed his affiliation from the Western to Eastern faction and criticized his teacher Yi I after his death, earning hatred and contempt of the Westerners as well as Seonjo, who greatly respected Yi I. Chŏng left the court and went back to his hometown where he formed a private society with his supporters. Called Great Common Society (대동계), anyone could join the society regardless of one's social status or gender, and they met each month to socialize together as well as study and also undergo military training. It was not a secret society as it helped defeat the Japanese marauders at the local government's request in one occasion. The society spread throughout Honam region (today's Jeolla) and even beyond. One day a government official in Hwanghae province reported to King Seonjo that there was conspiracy for rebellion in his areas and that their leader was Chŏng Yŏrip.

There is still a great deal of dispute whether Chŏng was conspiring to rebel or whether it was a frame up concocted by the Westerners. There is also a dispute about the nature and purpose of Great Common Society. Chŏng supposedly said, "the world is something to be shared and therefore there cannot be one master." He argued that the world belonged to the people, and whoever chosen by them was the king. Chŏng's philosophy reflected a desire for classless society, opposition to hereditary monarchy, and possibly even republicanism. Such revolutionary ideas and presence of armed supporters could not help but attract attention of his enemies. For a long time in Korean history, Chŏng Yŏrip's rebellion has been accepted as a fact even by the Easterners, but some historians note that there was no evidence except confessions from tortured followers and letters and writings discovered in his house, which could have been forged.

What is undisputed is that Chŏng Yŏrip's supposed rebellion led to a widespread purge of countless Easterners who had nothing to do with Chŏng and who died terrible deaths as a result. Chŏng Ch'ŏl, head of the Western faction and a famous poet whose poems are still studied in Korean schools, was in charge of investigating the case and used the case to purge Easterners who had slightest connection with Chŏng Yŏrip. It was said that even a man who shed tears because dust entered his eyes (when Chŏng Yŏrip's body was mutilated after his suicide) was killed for suspected sympathy for Chŏng Yŏrip.

== Song Ikp'il and An Family ==
According to some accounts, the origin of Treason Case of 1589 goes back to the Third Literati Purge of 1519 during Jungjong's reign and the resulting grudge between two families. After the head of the Sarim, Cho Kwangjo, was executed on framed charges in 1519, Right State Councillor An Tang was dismissed for supporting Cho and his followers, among whom were his sons. In 1521, Song Saryŏn, An's family slave who rose to become a government official of senior fifth rank under An Tang's patronage, reported to King Jungjong that An Tang's son was conspiring to kill Chief State Councillor Nam Kon and Sim Chŏng, instigators of the Third Literati Purge of 1519. He presented a guest list for funeral of An's wife as the evidence of conspirators’ meeting. At least a dozen Sarim scholars including An Tang and his family were killed in this event, called False Treason Case of 1521 (Sinsa muok·신사무옥), and Song Saryŏn was rewarded with promotion to high rank and the An family's entire possessions.

One of his sons was Song Ikp'il, who became a scholar of such renown that he formed friendship with Yi I and leading Westerners who praised that his achievement was enough to cover his father's crimes. It is remarkable indeed that Song Ikp'il overcame the fact that his father not only betrayed his master and benefactor, which would be considered one of the worst sins in Confucian world, but caused one of purges against the Sarim scholars, especially Cho Kwangjo's supporters. By Seonjo's reign, the Sarim faction took control of the government and Cho Kwangjo and the An family were fully rehabilitated as their martyrs.

However, some hardline Easterners saw Song Ikp'il as the mastermind behind the Westerners and instigated the descendants of An Tang to seek justice and punishment for Song Saryŏn, who was then deceased after enjoying thirty years of power and wealth. After an reinvestigation in 1586, it was determined that An Tang and others were falsely accused by Song Saryoen and over 70 family members of Song Saryŏn including Song Ikp'il were enslaved and given to Ahn family as compensation. Facing certain revenge from aggrieved An family, the Song family scattered and became fugitives. Song Ikp'il, who turned from a respected scholar to fugitive slave overnight, hid himself by secretly staying with leaders of the Westerners such as Chŏng Ch'ŏl, his disciple and famous scholar Kim Jang-saeng, and even an Easterner like Yi Sanhae. According to some accounts, it was while Song Ikp'il was in Hwanghae area that the accusation of treason was made against Chŏng Yŏrip, who lived in Honam. During the whole period when Chŏng Ch'ŏl was in charge of investigating the treason case and interrogated the Easterners, Song Ikp'il was said to be staying with Chŏng Ch'ŏl.

== Purge of Easterners ==
When the accusation against Chŏng Yŏrip was first made, the Easterners held key positions and were in charge of investigating the case. The Easterners told Seonjo that Chŏng Yŏrip could not possibly be plotting a rebellion when Chŏng unexpectedly committed suicide, which was considered an admission of guilt. The Westerners accused the Easterners of being half-hearted in pursuing the case, and Seonjo promoted hardline Westerner Chŏng Ch'ŏl as Right State Councillor and put him in charge of investigation despite Chŏng Ch'ŏl's initial refusal. Soon afterward, Chŏng Yŏrip's nephew began to mention names of the Easterners including Left State Councillor Chŏng Ŏnsin, hardliner Yi Pal, and many others (It was customary to use to torture when interrogating prisoners). Their denial of being close to Chŏng Yŏrip angered Seonjo since many of their letters were found in Chŏng's house, some of which were critical of the king and his rule. (It was said that Chŏng Ŏnsin was told by his men that his letters with Chŏng were destroyed, but they only destroyed ones that directly mentioned his name and not nicknames. When Chŏng Ŏnsin denied exchanging letters with Chŏng Yŏrip, Seonjo angrily asked, "Does he think I have no eyes?" pointing to 19 letters in which they discussed state affairs.) Chŏng Ch'ŏl asked for leniency with Chŏng Ŏnsin, Yi Pal, and others claiming that they could not know Chŏng Yŏrip's evil side, but the Easterners claim that Chŏng Ch'ŏl sought to destroy them while appearing to try to save them on the outside. Indeed, Yi Pal, Yi Pal's brother, Ch'oe Yŏnggyŏng, and many others died in prison of torture or illness. (Chŏng Ch'ŏl's animosity with Yi Pal was such that he even spat on him in one occasion.) Even Yi Pal's 80-year-old mother and 8-year-old son were killed (although Chŏng Ch'ŏl supposedly opposed it). The treason case went on for three years, and 1,000 people were killed or exiled. (According to some accounts, the death toll was 1,000.)

However, it was Seonjo who probably played a greater role than anyone else in turning Chŏng Yŏrip's treason case into the widespread purge it became. Sarim's division strengthened the king's power, and the purge was focused on hardline Easterners (Chŏng Yŏrip, Yi Pal) as opposed to moderate Easterners (Yi Sanhae, Yu Sŏngnyong) who came out unscathed. Hardline Easterners were the most radical of the Sarim factions. In contrast, Yi Sanhae and Yu Sŏngnyong were protected by Seonjo when their names came up in the treason case. Later Seonjo would blame Chŏng Ch'ŏl for excesses of Treason Case of 1589.

== Aftermath ==
The Treason Case of 1589 is significant as the moment when the conflict within Sarim faction was irrevocably marred with bad blood, becoming a struggle of life and death that characterized many periods of Joseon politics. The Eastern faction was further split between hardline Northerners and moderate Southerners over the question of punishing Chŏng Ch'ŏl and other Westerners. The Northern faction came on top and continued the cycle of revenge for earlier wrongs. The Treason Case of 1589 is also blamed for Joseon's unpreparedness and poor showing in the Japanese Invasion of 1592 three years later. Some historians blame Treason Case of 1589 for the subsequent discrimination against Honam region as land of rebellion, whose effect is still felt today. It is also remembered today for Chŏng Yŏrip's revolutionary ideas ahead of its time.
