= History of Joseon =

Korean history 1392 to 1897

The Joseon dynasty ruled Korea from 1392 to 1897.

The history of Joseon is largely divided into two parts: the early period and the late period; some divide it into three parts, including a middle period. The standard for dividing the early and the late periods is the Imjin War (1592–1598). The standard for dividing the early and the middle periods is the Jungjong coup (1506), while the standard for dividing the middle and the late periods is the Imjin War (1592–1598) or the Qing invasion (1636–1637).

The whole period of the Joseon dynasty through also to 1910 is included in the royal archives now part of the National Museum of the Annals of the Joseon dynasty at Pyeongchang opened in the autumn of 2023.

== Rise to prominence ==
By the late 14th century, the 400-year-old Goryeo dynasty established by Wang Kŏn in 918 was tottering, its foundations collapsing from years of war and de facto occupation by the disintegrating Mongol Empire. The legitimacy of the royal family itself was also becoming an increasingly disputed issue within the court, as the ruling house was claimed to not only have failed to govern the kingdom effectively, but was also supposedly tarnished by generations of forced intermarriage with the Yuan dynasty and rivalries among its various branches, while King U's biological mother being a known slave led some to debate his descent from King Gongmin. Influential aristocrats, generals, and ministers struggled for royal favor and domination of the court, resulting in deep division among various factions. With the ever-increasing number of raids conducted by Japanese pirates and the invasions of the Red Turbans, those who came to dominate the royal court were the reform-minded Sinjin faction of the scholar-officials and the opposing Gwonmun faction of the old aristocratic families, as well as generals who could fight off the foreign threats: namely Yi Sŏng-gye and a former superior and rival, Ch'oe Yŏng.

Following the struggle between the emerging Ming dynasty under Zhu Yuanzhang (the later Hongwu Emperor) and the Mongol Yuan dynasty, Goryeo remained neutral with its monarchs attempting to maintain friendly diplomatic relations with both as the conflict remained inconclusive. The royal court in Goryeo split into two factions: the group led by General Yi (favouring the militarily more powerful Ming) and the camp led by General Ch'oe (royalists standing by the Goryeo royal family). When a Ming messenger came to Goryeo in 1388 (the 14th year of King U) to demand the return of a significant portion of Goryeo's northern territory, General Ch'oe seized the chance and argued for the invasion of the Liaodong Peninsula. (Goryeo was the successor state of the ancient kingdom of Goguryeo; as such, restoring Manchuria as part of Korean territory was part of its foreign policy throughout its history.) A staunchly opposed Yi was chosen to lead the invasion; however, at Wihwa Island on the Yalu River, he revolted and traveled back to Gaegyeong (modern-day Gaeseong and the capital of Goryeo). He proceeded to eliminate General Ch'oe and his followers and began a coup d'état, overthrowing King U in favor of his son, King Chang, in 1388. He later killed King U and his son after a failed restoration and forcibly placed a royal named Yo on the throne, who became King Gongyang. After indirectly enforcing his grasp on the royal court through the puppet king, Yi proceeded to ally himself with members of the Sinjin aristocracy, such as Chŏng To-jŏn and Cho Chun. One of his first acts as the de facto generalissimo of Goryeo was to pass the Gwajeon Law, which effectively confiscated land from the wealthy and generally conservative Gwonmun aristocrats and redistributed it among Yi's supporters in the Sinjin camp. In 1392 (the fourth year of King Gongyang), Yi's fifth son, Yi Pang-wŏn, after failing to persuade a noteworthy aristocrat named Chŏng Mong-ju, a supporter of the old dynasty, to swear allegiance to the new reign, had Chŏng Mong-ju killed by five assassins, including Jo Yeong-gyu, at Seonjuk Bridge near Gaegyeong, eliminating a key figure in the opposition to Yi Sŏng-gye's rule. That same year, Yi dethroned King Gongyang, exiled him to Wonju, and ascended the throne. The Goryeo dynasty had come to an end after almost 500 years of rule.

== Elimination of the vestiges of Goryeo ==
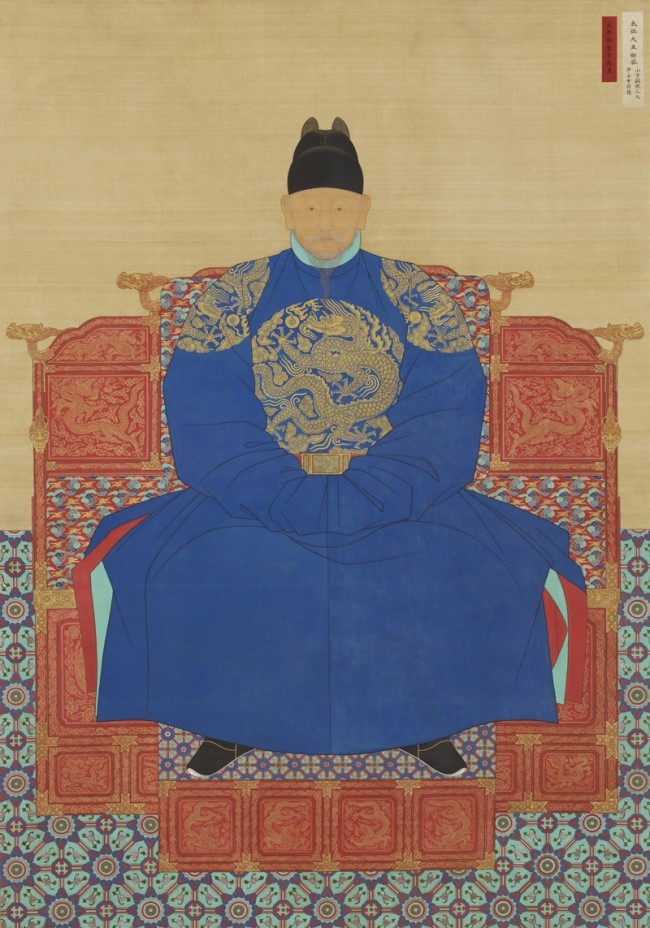
King Taejo's portrait

In the beginning of his reign, Yi Sŏng-gye, now King Taejo, intended to continue using the name Goryeo for the country he ruled and simply change the royal line of descent to his own, thus maintaining the facade of continuing the 500-year-old Goryeo tradition. However, numerous threats of mutiny from the drastically weakened but still influential Gwonmun nobles—who continued to swear allegiance to the remnants of the Goryeo dynasty, now the demoted Wang clan—and the overall belief in the reformed court that a new dynastic title was needed to signify the change led him to declare a new dynasty in 1393. He called it the Kingdom of Great Joseon in an effort to revive an older dynasty by the same name. However, the new dynasty came to be referred to, even by historians today, simply by the name of its ruling house.

With the declaration of the new royal house, concerns were voiced on how to handle the remaining descendants of the deposed Wang family. King Taejo and his officials felt that if the legitimacy of their rule were ever questioned by the remaining members of the Goryeo dynasty, they might have to suppress a mass rebellion or even risk losing the recently gained throne. In the end, Taejo had his prime minister, Chŏng Tojŏn, summon the Wang family to the coast of the Yellow Sea and instruct them to board a ship bound for Ganghwa Island, where they were told they would live quietly out of the government's sight. However, the entire ploy was a trap. A crew member on board was instructed beforehand to smash a hole in the hull as soon as the ship had entered sufficiently deep waters. The ship sank, and the members of the Goryeo dynasty akin to the recent Kings of Mongolian descent were drowned. According to an urban legend, after the fate became known of the Wangs gullible enough to board the doomed ship reached their relatives on the mainland, most of them changed their surnames from Wang (王) to Ok (玉) by adding an extra brush stroke, thus hiding their true descent. Meanwhile, the female lines were spared and those who were of the Wang clan but distant enough to have no claim over the Goryeo throne were forced to change their surnames to that of their maternal side. Nonetheless, most Korean clans up to the time now have the lineage of Goryeo kings due to intermarriage.

Calls for a new capital followed the demise of those closest to the throne of the Goryeo dynasty. Although Gaegyeong had served well as the seat of government for over 400 years, it was a tradition for new dynasties in Korea to move their capitals, as this was considered fortuitous according to the Chinese feng shui philosophy of geomancy. Gaegyeong was also thought to have long since lost the energy required to maintain a permanent capital.

Three sites were officially considered for the new capital: the foot of Mount Gyeryong and the cities of Muak and Hanyang. The location near Mount Gyeryong was rejected because of its relatively rough terrain and lack of convenient communication. Muak was seriously considered before King Taejo decided that Hanyang was the most fitting candidate. Hanyang outranked its rivals in various respects. Not only was it easily accessible from sea and land, and geographically at the center of the Korean Peninsula, but the fertile Han River valley on which the ancient city was situated had historically been the most contested region among the Three Kingdoms of Korea. For centuries, Hanyang had also been said to be blessed, and Korean geomancers claimed that the city occupied a sacrosanct place flowing with geomantic energy. Furthermore, it had large mountains to the north and smaller mountains to the south for defense, with a large plain in between; thus, the city would fit the customary north–south axis. In 1394, Hanyang was declared the new capital and formally renamed Hanseong. (It would eventually become the current capital of South Korea, Seoul.) That year, the foot of Mount Bugak was chosen for the foundation of the main palace. Development and construction of the city and its complicated system of avenues, gates, walls, civilian residences, educational facilities, government buildings, and five main palace complexes began in 1394 as well. The official royal residence, Gyeongbok Palace, was completed in 1395, while the less important Changdeok Palace was completed in 1405. Other royal palaces followed, and by the end of the first half of the 15th century, the capital had been completed.

== Early strife ==
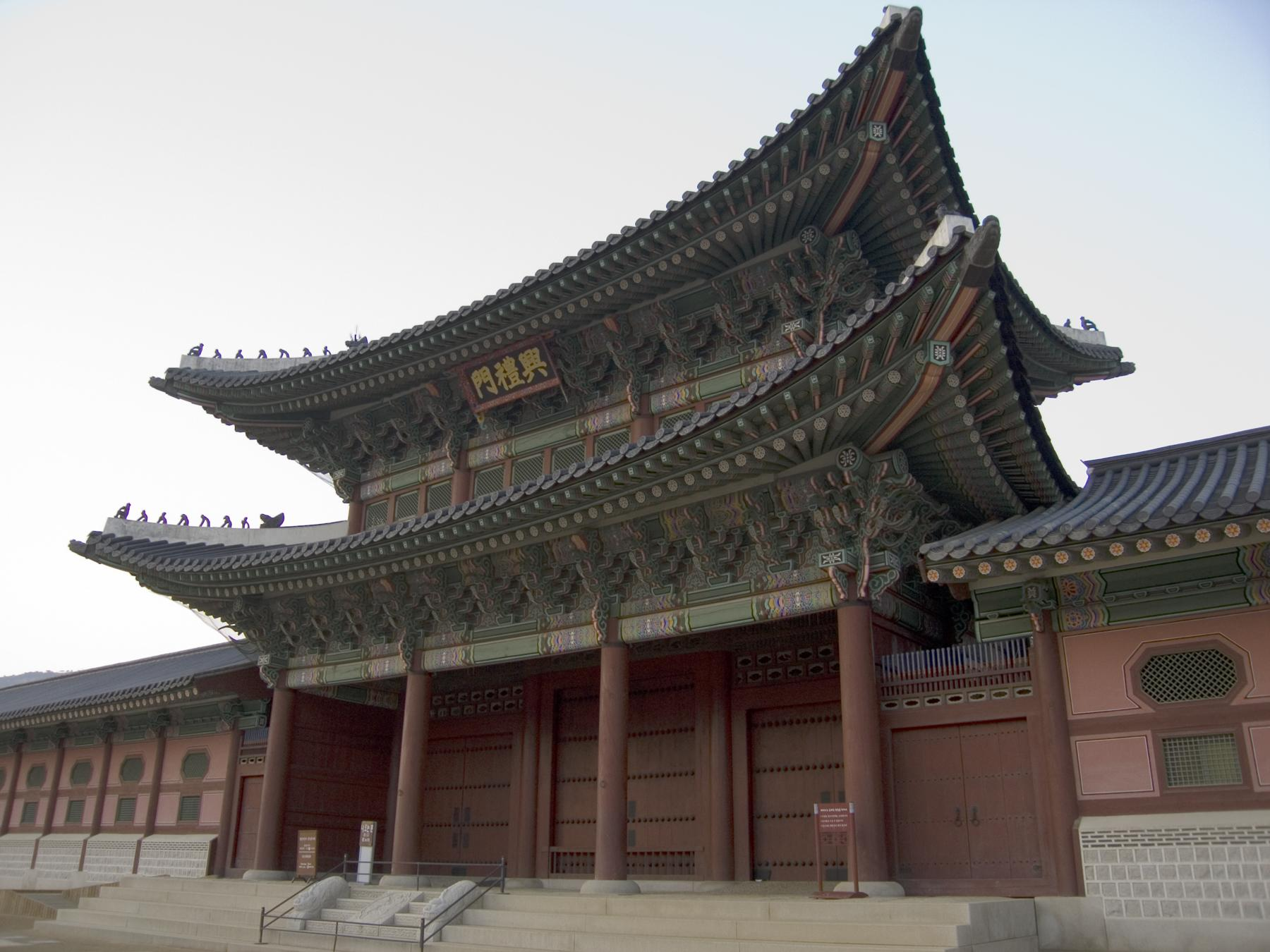
Gyeongbokgung

King Taejo had two wives, both of whom bore him sons. His first wife, Queen Sineui, who died before the overthrow of Goryeo, gave birth to six sons. Taejo's wife upon his ascension to the throne, Queen Sindeok, had two sons. When the new dynasty was established, Taejo brought up the issue of which son would be his successor. Although Taejo's fifth son by Queen Sineui, Yi Pang-wŏn, had contributed most to his father's rise to power, he harbored a profound hatred of two of his father's key allies in the court, Prime Minister Chŏng To-jŏn and Nam Eun. Both sides were fully aware of the mutual animosity and felt threatened. When it became clear that Yi Pang-wŏn was the most worthy successor to the throne, Chŏng used his influence on the king to convince him that the wisest choice would be the son whom Taejo loved most, not the son he felt was best for the kingdom. In 1392, the eighth son of King Taejo (the second son of Queen Sindeok)—Grand Prince Uian (Yi Pang-sŏk)—was appointed Prince Royal, or successor to the throne. After the sudden death of the queen, and while King Taejo was still in mourning, Chŏng conspired to kill Yi Pang-wŏn and his brothers to secure his position in the court. In 1398, upon hearing of this plan, Yi Pang-wŏn immediately revolted and raided the palace, killing Chŏng, his followers, and the two sons of the late Queen Sindeok. This became known as the First Strife of Princes.

Aghast at the fact that his sons were willing to kill one another for the crown, and psychologically exhausted from the death of his second wife, King Taejo immediately crowned his second son—Yi Pang-gwa, later King Jeongjong—as the new ruler. Soon after, he departed to the northern city of Hamhung.

One of King Jeongjong's first acts as monarch was to revert the capital to Kaesong, where he is believed to have been considerably more comfortable. Meanwhile, Yi Pang-wŏn, not discouraged by the fact that his elder brother held the throne, began plotting to be established as Royal Prince Successor, the traditional title for brothers appointed as heir presumptives to the throne when the incumbent had no issue. However, Yi Pang-wŏn's plans were opposed by Taejo's fourth son, Yi Pang-gan, who also yearned for power. In 1400, the tensions between Yi Pang-wŏn's faction and Yi Pang-gan's camp escalated into an all-out conflict that came to be known as the Second Strife of Princes. In the aftermath of the struggle, the defeated Yi Pang-gan was exiled to Tosan, while those who had urged him to battle Yi Pang-wŏn were executed. Thoroughly intimidated, King Jeongjong immediately invested Pang-wŏn as heir presumptive and voluntarily abdicated. That same year, Pang-wŏn finally assumed the throne of Joseon, becoming King Taejong. In 1401, the Joseon Dynasty was officially admitted into a tributary relationship with the Ming dynasty of China.

In the beginning of Taejong's reign, Taejo refused to relinquish the royal seal that signified the legitimacy of a king's rule. Uncomfortable at the fact that his father did not recognize him as a de jure ruler because of the family deaths he had caused, Taejong sent several messengers, among them his childhood friend Bak Sun, to recover the royal seal. However, Taejo assassinated every messenger that came into sight of his guards as a sign of his fury at Taejong, who remained unaware of their fates. This episode became known as the Case of the Hamhung Envoys, and the term "Hamhung envoy" is still used in the Korean language to refer to a person who has gone on an assignment and has not been heard from.

== Consolidation of power ==
With his father unwilling to pass over the royal seal he needed for recognition, Taejong began to initiate policies he believed would prove his intelligence and right to rule. One of his first acts as king was to abolish the privilege enjoyed by the upper echelons of the government and aristocracy to maintain private armies. This effectively severed their ability to muster large-scale revolts, and drastically increased the number of men employed in the national military.

Taejong's next act as king was to revise the law concerning the taxation of land ownership and the documentation of state subjects. Although many aristocrats who benefited from King Taejo's property redistribution laws, from the Gwonmun aristocrats to the members of the Sinjin faction, had managed to avoid taxation by deliberately hiding land they acquired, King Taejong's re-investigation of land ownership in 1405 put an end to such practices. With the discovery of previously hidden land, national income increased twofold. In addition, King Taejong initiated the first population survey in 1413 and ordered the documentation of family names and clans, places of birth and death, and dates of birth and death for all Korean men. All males over the age of 16, whichever class in society they occupied, were also required by law to carry wooden tablets on which their name, birth date, and other information was engraved. Many historians regard this legislation as the predecessor of the Korean resident identification and social security system. It was also effective in preventing men from evading their mandatory military service.

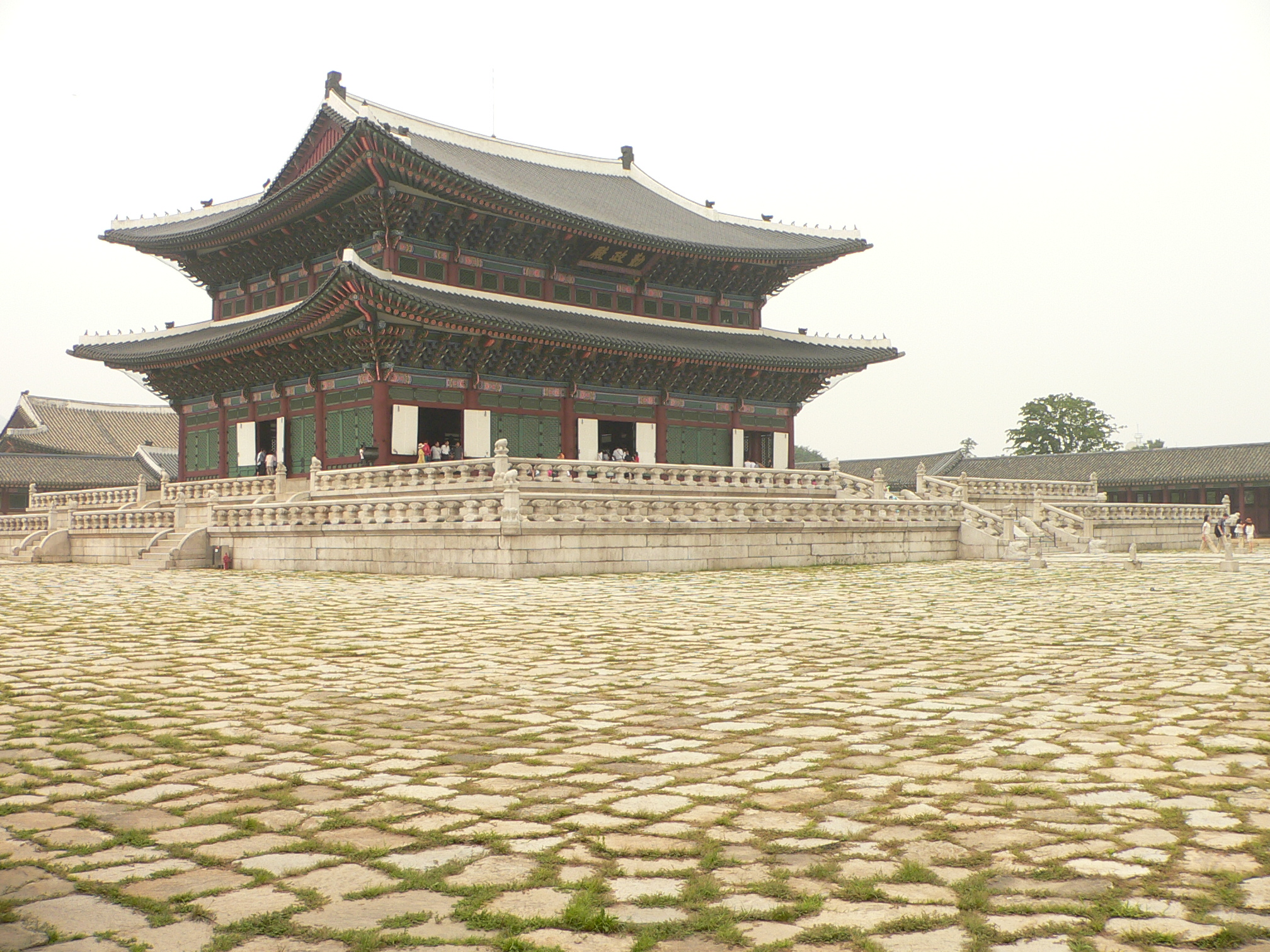
Geunjeongjeon (Throne Hall)

In 1399 (the second year of King Jeongjong), Taejong had played an influential role in scrapping the Dopyeong Assembly—a council of the old government that held a monopoly on court power during the waning years of the Goryeo dynasty—in favor of the State Council of Joseon, a new branch of central administration that revolved around the king and his edicts. After passing the subject documentation and taxation laws, King Taejong issued a decree that decisions passed by the Euijeong Department could only come into effect with the approval of the king. This ended the custom in which court ministers and advisers made decisions by debating and negotiating among themselves, with the king as an onlooker, and thus brought royal power to new heights. Shortly afterward, Taejong also created a branch of the government, known as the Sinmun Office, to hear cases in which subjects felt they had been exploited or treated unfairly by government officials or aristocrats.

In 1418, Taejong abdicated. Two months later, in August, Sejong ascended to the throne. However, Taejong retained certain powers at court, particularly regarding military matters, until he died in 1422. King Sejong was an effective military planner. In May 1419, under the advice and guidance of his father, he embarked on the Gihae Eastern Expedition against Japanese pirates who had been operating out of Tsushima. (Before the Gihae expedition, Korea had cleared out pirates in 1389 and 1396.)

In September 1419, the daimyō of Tsushima, Sadamori, capitulated to the Joseon court. In 1443, The Treaty of Gyehae was signed, in which the Daimyo was granted the right to conduct trade with Korea on 50 ships per year, in exchange for sending tribute to Korea and helping stop any Japanese coastal pirate raid on Korean ports.

On the northern border, Sejong established four forts and six posts (사군육진; 四郡六鎭) to safeguard his people from the hostile Chinese and Jurchens (who later became the Manchus) living in Manchuria. In 1433, he sent Kim Chongsŏ, a prominent general, north to destroy the Jurchens. Kim's military campaign captured several castles, pushed north, and restored Korean territory, roughly the present-day border between North Korea and China.

During the rule of Sejong, Korea saw technological advances in natural science, agriculture, literature, and traditional medicine. Because of his success, Sejong received the title "King Sejong the Great of Joseon". His most remembered contribution is the creation of Hangul, the Korean alphabet, in 1443. Before that, Korean literati had used the Hanja writing system—traditional Chinese characters with Korean pronunciation and meaning—and a written language known as Hanmun, which was basically Classical Chinese, for official court documents. Everyday written use of Hanja and Hanmun ended gradually in the latter half of the 20th century.

== Six martyred ministers ==
After King Sejong's death, his son Munjong continued his legacy but died of illness in 1452, two years after becoming king. Munjong's son Danjong then became king at the age of 12, but his uncle Sejo deposed him and took control of the government himself, becoming the seventh king of Joseon in 1455. After six ministers loyal to Danjong tried to assassinate Sejo in order to return Danjong to the throne, Sejo executed the six ministers and also killed Danjong, who was in exile. Despite having snatched the throne from his young nephew, Sejo proved to be an able ruler. He strengthened the administrative system, enabling the government to determine exact population numbers and to mobilize troops effectively. He also revised land ordinances to improve the national economy and encouraged the publication of books. Most importantly, he compiled the Grand Code for State Administration, which became the cornerstone of dynastic administration and provided the first written form of constitutional law in Korea.

Sejo's son Yejong succeeded him to become the eighth king, but died two years later in 1469. Yejong's nephew Seongjong then ascended to the throne. His reign was marked by prosperity, economic growth, and the rise of neo-Confucian scholars called Sarim, who were encouraged by Seongjong to enter court politics. Seongjong established the Hongmun'gwan, a royal library and advisory council composed of Confucian scholars, with whom he discussed philosophy and government policies. He ushered in a cultural golden age that rivaled King Sejong's reign, with the publication of numerous books on geography, ethics, and other topics. He also launched several military campaigns against the Jurchens to stabilize the northern border.

== Literati purges ==
Seongjong's son Yeonsangun, whose reign was marked by a series of bloody purges of neo-Confucian scholars between 1498 and 1506, is often considered the worst tyrant in the Joseon Dynasty. His behavior became erratic after he learned that his biological mother was not Queen Jung-hyeon but deposed Consort Yun, who had been forced to drink poison after poisoning one of Seongjong's concubines out of jealousy and leaving a scratch mark on Seongjong's face. When he was shown a piece of clothing allegedly stained with blood that his mother had vomited after drinking poison, he beat to death two of the concubines who had accused Consort Yun and pushed Grand Queen Insu, who died afterward. He executed government officials who supported Consort Yun's death, along with their families; he also executed Sarim scholars for writing texts critical of Sejo's usurpation of the throne. He seized a thousand women from the provinces to serve as palace entertainers and appropriated the Seonggyungwan, the Royal University, as a personal pleasure ground. He abolished the Hongmun'gwan and the Office of Censors, whose function was to criticize inappropriate actions and policies of the king. He banned the use of Hangul after commoners criticized him with posters written in that alphabet. After twelve years, he was deposed in a coup that placed his half-brother Jungjong on the throne in 1506.

Jungjong was a fundamentally weak king because of the circumstances that placed him on the throne, but his reign also saw significant reforms led by his minister Cho Kwangjo, the charismatic leader of Sarim scholars. He established a local self-government system called Hyang'yak to strengthen local autonomy and communal spirit; sought to reduce the gap between rich and poor by distributing land to farmers more equally and by limiting the amount of land and the number of slaves that one could own; promulgated Confucian writings widely with vernacular translations; and reduced the number of bureaucrats. According to Veritable Records of the Joseon Dynasty, no official dared to take a bribe or exploit the populace during this time because Cho applied the law so strictly. These radical reforms were very popular with commoners but were fiercely opposed by the conservative officials who had helped to put Jungjong on the throne. A myth tells that they plotted to make Jungjong doubt Cho's loyalty by writing "Jo will become king" (주초위왕, 走肖爲王) with honey on leaves, so that caterpillars left behind the phrase like a supernatural manifestation. Cho was executed, and most of his reform measures died with him in the Third Literati Purge of 1519. For nearly 50 years afterward, court politics were marred by bloody and chaotic struggles between factions backing rival consorts and princes. In-laws of the royal family wielded great power and contributed to much of the corruption.

== Factional struggle ==
The Sarim faction, which suffered a series of political defeats during the reign of Yeonsangun, Jungjong, and Myeongjong, gained control of the government under Seonjo, but was soon split into a Western faction and an Eastern faction, which in turn split into Northern and Southern factions. The Western faction also eventually split into the Old Learning and New Learning factions. Changes in power between these factions were often accomplished with charges of treason and accompanied by bloody purges, initiating a cycle of revenge.

One example is the Gichuk Treason Case of 1589 (기축옥사), in which an Easterner, Jeong Yeo-rip, was accused of conspiracy to start a rebellion. Jeong had formed a society with a group of supporters who had received military training to fight against Japanese marauders. There is still dispute about the nature and purpose of Jeong's group, which reflected a desire for a classless society and spread throughout the Honam region. Jeong Cheol, the head of the Western faction, was in charge of investigating the case and used it to carry out a widespread purge of Easterners who had the slightest connection with Jeong Yeo-rip. A thousand Easterners were killed or exiled.

== Japanese invasions ==
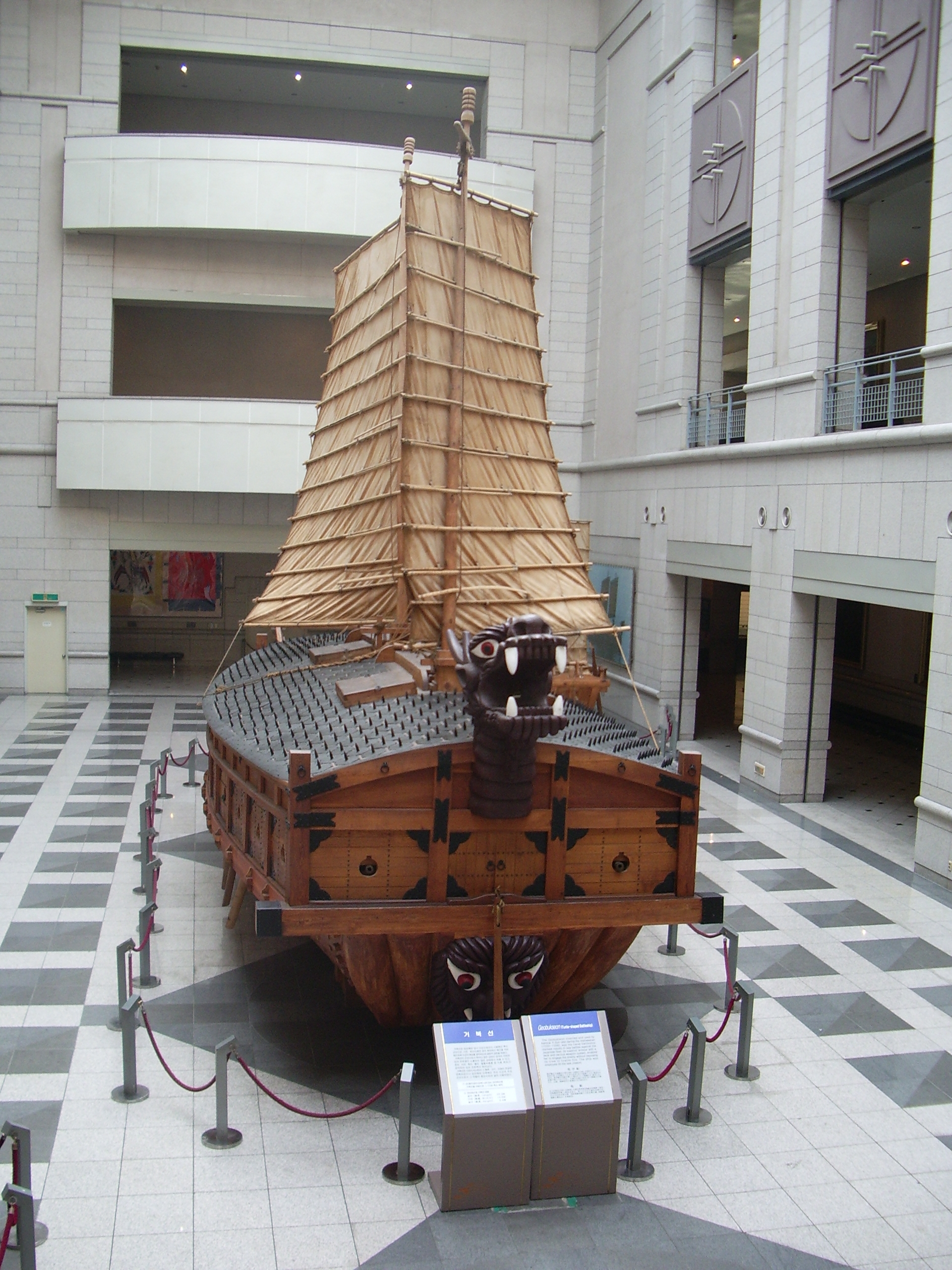
The Turtle ship. The historical existence of the ironclad roof is disputed.

Japanese pirates attacked Korea with a gun and land as many as 529 times in the period and 312 times in the Joseon period. The only job of the Korean navy was to secure the maritime trade against the pirates. The navy maintained superiority over the pirates by using advanced gunpowder technologies, such as cannons and fire arrows (e.g., singijeon deployed by hwacha).

During the Japanese invasions of Korea from 1592 to 1598, Japanese warlord Toyotomi Hideyoshi, hoping to conquer Ming China with Portuguese guns, invaded Korea with his daimyō and their troops in 1592 and 1597. Factional divisions in the Joseon court, inability to assess Japanese military capability, and failed attempts at diplomacy led to poor preparation on Joseon's part. Using European firearms, the Japanese were able to occupy most of the southern peninsula within months, with both Pyongyang and Hanseong (present-day Seoul) captured. According to the Veritable Records of the Joseon Dynasty, the Japanese were joined by rebelling Korean slaves, who burned down the palace of Gyeongbokgung and its storehouse of slave records.

Local resistance, however, slowed down the Japanese advance, and decisive naval victories by Admiral Yi Sun-sin left control of sea routes in Korean hands, severely hampering Japanese supply lines. Furthermore, Ming China intervened on the side of the Koreans, sending a large force in 1593 that helped push back the Japanese. During the war, the Koreans developed powerful firearms, high-quality gunpowder, and Turtle ships.

The Joseon and Ming forces defeated the Japanese, who retreated back to their homeland, but victory came at a deep price. Farmlands were devastated, irrigation dikes were destroyed, and villages and towns were burned down. The population was first plundered and then dispersed, and tens of thousands of skilled workers (celadon ware makers, craftsmen, artisans, etc.) were either killed or kidnapped and taken to Japan as captives to help the Japanese develop their crafts. The Japanese also pilfered many thousands of Joseon historical and royal boiis, many of which are preserved in Japanese museums.

In 1598, the Japanese withdrew their troops from Korea after Hideyoshi died. As the Japanese retreated, Admiral Yi Sun-sin ordered a vigorous pursuit by the Koreans. However, Yi was killed by a single bullet in the Battle of Noryang on December 16, 1598.

As a result of the wars, the Japanese took the ears and noses of some 38,000 Koreans as trophies (a common samurai practice) and built the Mimizuka monument in Kyōto. The long war reduced the productive capacity of farmlands from 1,708,000 kyol (a land unit) to 541,000 kyol. Following the war, relations between Korea and Japan were completely suspended, and Japan was cut off from the technology of continental Asia. After the death of Hideyoshi, however, negotiations between the Korean court and the Tokugawa shogunate were carried out via the Japanese lord on Tsushima.

In 1604, Tokugawa Ieyasu, needing to restore commercial relations with Korea in order to regain access to the technology of the mainland, met Korea's demands and released some 3,000 captive Koreans. As a result, in 1607, a Korean mission visited Edo, and diplomatic and trade relations were restored on a limited basis.

== Manchu invasions ==
Following these events, the Korean kingdom became increasingly isolationist. In addition, the Ming dynasty was weakened, partly because of the war between Korea and Japan, and the new Qing dynasty was established. The Koreans decided to build tighter borders, exert more control over inter-border traffic, and wait out the initial turbulence of the Manchu overthrow of the Ming.

Despite these limits, Korea had extensive trade with Mongolia, Northern Asia, China, and Japan. However, at times, trade with Japan was limited to missions appointed by the king in order to prevent piracy and maintain orderly trade, which had been a problem even in the Goryeo period.

Korea was twice invaded by the Manchus, in 1627 (the First Manchu Invasion of Korea) and 1637 (the Second Manchu Invasion of Korea). Korea surrendered to the Manchus and became a tributary state of the Qing dynasty, which at that time involved two-way trade missions with China.

== Political factions ==
Throughout the Joseon era, various regional and ideological factions struggled for dominance of the political system. In the earliest years of Joseon, tension between the capital faction and the Yeongnam-based Sarim faction predominated. Village Seowon, which combined the functions of Confucian shrines with educational institutions, often reflected the factional alignment of the local elites. In areas where the Western faction dominated, key figures of Western thought were enshrined. In the 16th century, a nationwide split occurred between the Eastern faction (Dong-in) and Western faction (Seo-in). The Eastern faction in turn split under the reign of Seonjo between the hard-line Northern faction (Buk-in) and the moderate Southern faction (Nam-in). The Western faction later split between the Old Learning (Noron) and the Young Learning (Soron) factions.

These splits were often driven by questions of royal succession or appropriate royal conduct. For example, the split between the Northerners and Southerners was driven by questions involving the proper successor to Seonjo, who had no legitimate son. The Northerners came to support the Gwanghaegun; accordingly, they flourished under his reign (1608–1623) but were swept from power by the Westerners after the succession of Injo.

Under the reigns of Yeongjo and Jeongjo in the 18th century, the kings pursued a strict policy of equality, favoring no faction over another. However, during Jeongjo's reign, strife re-emerged between the Byeokpa and Sipa, two groups which cut across the earlier factions and differed in their attitudes toward Yeongjo's murder of his son, who was also Jeongjo's father. In the 19th century, the playing field shifted once more, and in-law families rather than scholarly factions came to dominate the throne. For most of the 19th century, the Jangdong branch of the Andong Kim clan was in control of the government; however, there was a brief interlude in which control shifted to the Pungyang Jo clan.

When Heungseon Daewongun took power, factional politics started to decline, and disappeared by the end of the 19th century.

== Late Joseon period ==
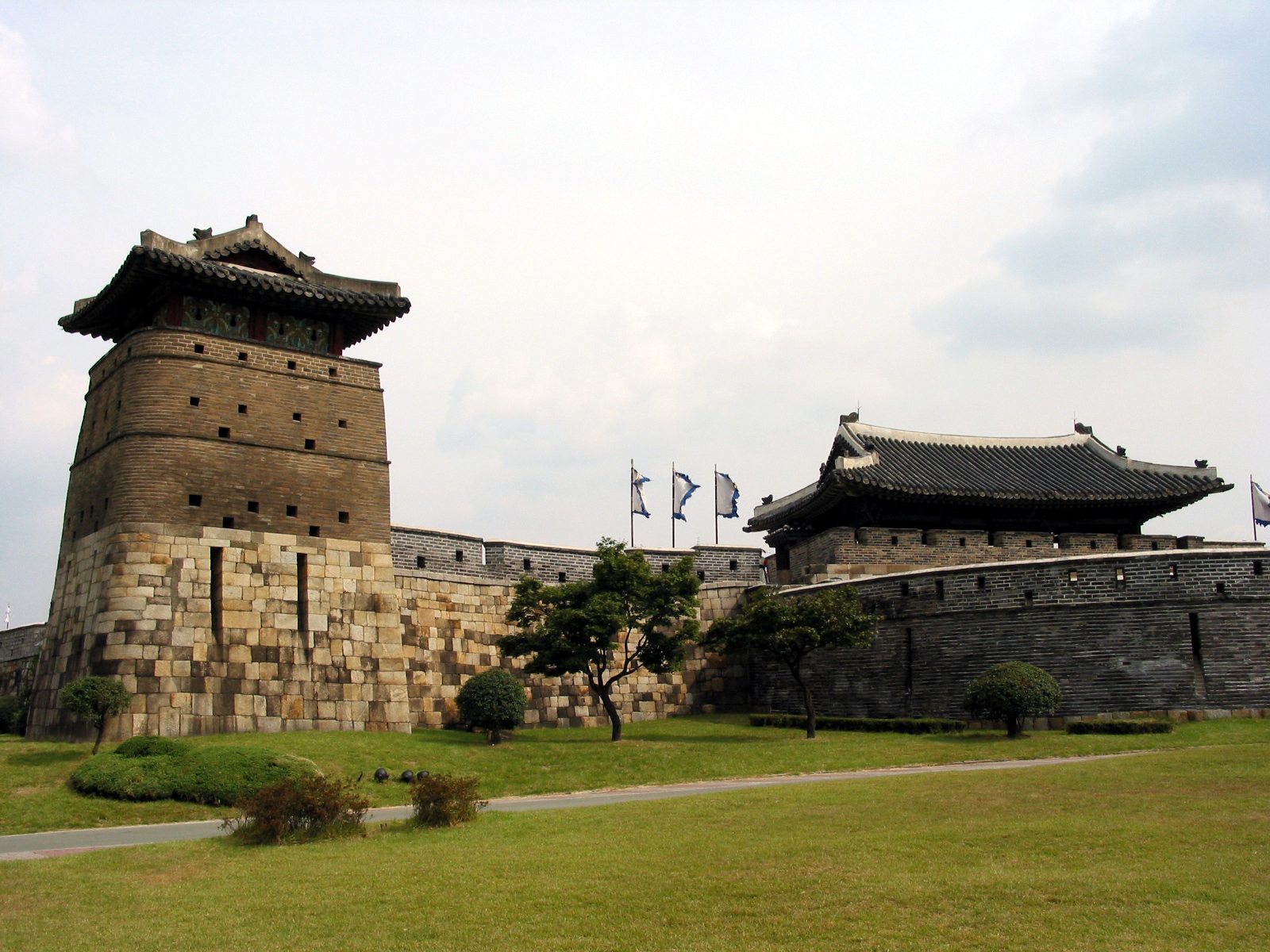
Hwaseong Fortress in Suwon.

After the Manchu invasions, Joseon experienced a nearly 200-year period of peace. King Yeongjo and King Jeongjo led a new renaissance of the Joseon dynasty. King Sukjong and his son King Yeongjo tried to solve the problems resulting from factional politics.

Yeongjo's grandson, King Jeongjo, made various reforms throughout his reign, notably establishing Kyujanggak, an imperial library. Its purpose was to improve the cultural and political position of Joseon and to recruit gifted officers to run the nation. King Jeongjo also spearheaded bold new social initiatives, opening government positions to those who would have previously been barred because of their social status. He had the support of many Silhak scholars, and in addition, the Silhak scholars supported Jeongjo's regal power. King Jeongjo's reign also saw the further growth and development of Joseon's popular culture.

During the 19th century, drought and floods alternately struck rice fields and farms in Korea and caused great famines. Making matters worse, rulers increased taxes on crops and required more free labor from the starving peasants. Anti-government and anti-landlord sentiment boiled over into violent uprisings.

In 1812, Hong Gyeong-nae led the peasants of Gasan in the northern part of Korea in an armed rebellion and occupied the region for several months. An army was sent to quell the rebellion but only succeeded after a savage scorched-earth campaign. Throughout Korea, all the way to Jeju Island, peasants continued to defy the king and ministers in Seoul, as well as the local nobility and wealthy landlords. In 1862, a group of farmers in Jinju, in Gyeongsang Province, rose up against their provincial officials and the wealthy landowners in response to exploitation of destitute farmers. The whole of Joseon was plunged in confusion. Choe Je-u (최제우, 崔濟愚, 1824–1894) established the ideology of Donghak (Eastern learning) in the 1860s, and started a seditious and secessionist movement that involved peasants forming into an anti-government militia that took over parts of southern Korea from 1862 to 1864. Roman Catholicism was also introduced in this period, but Christianity in all its forms was brutally oppressed by the Korean government until the late 1880s.

In 1863, King Gojong took the throne. His father, Regent Heungseon Daewongun, ruled for him until Gojong reached adulthood. Daewongun is largely said to have been responsible for the brutal suppression of Christianity in Korea during his regency. In the mid-1860s, he was the main proponent of isolationism and the instrument of the persecution of native and foreign Catholics, a policy that led directly to the French campaign against Korea in 1866. The early years of his rule also witnessed an effort to restore the dilapidated Gyeongbok Palace, the seat of royal authority. During Daewongun's reign, factional politics and power wielded by the Andong Kim clan disappeared.

In 1873, King Gojong announced his direct royal rule. With the subsequent retirement of Daewongun, Queen Min (later called Empress Myeongseong) gained complete control over her court and placed her family in high positions.

=== Western intervention ===
The French campaign against Korea in 1866 is also known as Byeonginyangyo (병인양요, Western Disturbance of the Byeong-in Year). It refers to the French occupation of Ganghwa Island in retaliation for the execution of French Jesuit priests proselytizing illicitly in Korea. The campaign, which lasted nearly six weeks, was the first armed encounter between Korea and a Western power. The overall result was a French retreat and a check on France's influence in the region. The violent encounter also confirmed Korea in its isolationism for another decade.

The United States expedition to Korea in 1871, also known as Sinmiyangyo (신미양요, Western Disturbance of the Sinmi Year), was the first American military action in Korea. It, too, took place predominantly on and around Ganghwa Island. The American military expeditionary force arrived to support an American diplomatic delegation sent to establish trade and diplomatic relations with Korea, to ascertain the fate of the General Sherman merchant ship, and to establish a treaty assuring aid for shipwrecked sailors. The conservative nature of the Joseon government and the assertiveness of the Americans led to a misunderstanding between the two parties that changed a diplomatic expedition into an armed conflict. The United States won a minor military victory, but because the Koreans refused to open the country to the Americans (and the U.S. forces in Korea did not have the authority or strength to press the issue), the United States failed to secure its diplomatic objectives.

In 1875, the Un'yō, a small Japanese warship, was dispatched to survey coastal waters without Korean permission. It attacked a Korean port and withdrew back to Japan. The Japanese took the opportunity to demand a treaty. The Treaty of Ganghwa became the first unequal treaty signed by Korea; it gave extraterritorial rights to Japanese citizens in Korea, forced the Korean government to open three ports—Busan, Incheon, and Wonsan—to Japanese and foreign trade, and made Korea establish its independence from China in foreign relations.

== Decline ==
An early version of the Korean flag.

In the 19th century, tensions mounted between Qing China and Japan, culminating in the First Sino-Japanese War (1894–1895). Much of this war was fought on the Korean Peninsula. Japan, having acquired Western military technology after the Meiji Restoration, had forced Joseon to sign the Treaty of Ganghwa in 1876. Japan encroached on Korean territory in search of fish, iron ore, and natural resources. It also established a strong economic presence, heralding the beginning of Japanese imperial expansion in East Asia.

=== Imo Rebellion and Gapsin Coup ===
As the dynasty declined, the king began to rely on newer, rifle-using armies. They were paid well, and members of the old army, who used spears and old matchlocks, lost much of their pay. The old army revolted in response. Heungseon Daewongun was restored to power, but the Qing general Yuan Shikai soon had him abducted by Chinese troops and taken to China, thus foiling his return. Four years later, Daewongun returned to Korea.

On December 4, 1884, five revolutionaries led a small army to Empress Myeongseong's brother's house and initiated a coup d'étât. It failed in three days. Some coup leaders, including Kim Ok-gyun, fled to Japan, and others were executed.

=== Donghak Peasant Revolution ===
The Donghak Peasant Revolution was an anti-government, anti-yangban, and anti-foreign campaign.

The peasants demanded land redistribution, lower taxes, democracy, and human rights. Taxes were so high that most farmers had been forced to sell their ancestral homesteads to rich landowners at bargain prices. As a result, the peasant class developed intense anti-Japanese and anti-yangban sentiments. The immediate causes of the rebellion were the actions of Jo Byong-gap, a government official whose rule was viewed by some as tyrannical and corrupt. On January 11, 1894, peasant leader Jeon Bong-jun defeated the government forces at the battle of Go-bu, and Jo's properties were handed out to the peasants. In the meantime, the Joseon government army attacked Jeonju, and the government and the peasant army concluded an agreement. However, the Joseon government then asked the Chinese government for urgent assistance in ending the revolt. After notifying the Japanese in accordance with the Convention of Tientsin, China sent troops into Korea. It was the catalyst for the First Sino-Japanese War.

In late June 1894, pro-Japanese forces hatched a plan to wipe out the peasant army in cooperation with the Japanese troops stationed in Incheon and Seoul. On October 16, the peasant army moved toward Gongju for the final battle, which was a trap: The Japanese and the pro-Japanese government troops were waiting for them. The peasant army was defeated in the Battle of Ugeumchi. The Japanese had cannons and other modern weapons, whereas the Korean peasants were armed only with bows and arrows, spears, swords, and some flintlock muskets. A few months later, Jeon was captured and executed.

The revolution failed, but many of the peasants' grievances would later be addressed through the Gabo Reform.

=== Assassination of Empress Myeongseong ===
In 1895, Empress Myeongseong (referred to as "Queen Min" by the United States and Japan) was assassinated by Japanese agents; she had tried to counter Japanese interference in Korea and was considering turning to Russia or China for support. The Japanese minister to Korea, Miura Gorō, orchestrated the plot against her. A group of Japanese agents, along with the Hullyeondae Army, entered the royal palace in Seoul, and an agent killed the empress and desecrated her body in the north wing of the palace.

=== Establishment of the Korean Empire ===
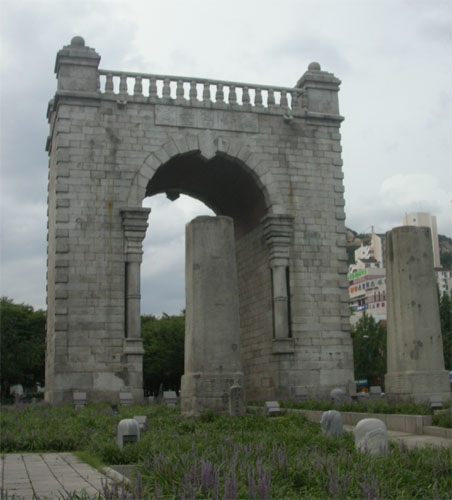
Independence Gate, built in 1896

The Chinese defeat in the 1894 war led to the Treaty of Shimonoseki between China and Japan, which officially guaranteed Korea's independence from its tributary status with China. For Japan, it was a step toward regional hegemony in Korea. After that, Korea built the Independence Gate and stopped paying tributes to the Qing dynasty. The Joseon court, pressured by encroachment from larger powers, felt the need to reinforce national integrity and declared the Korean Empire in 1897. Gojong assumed the title of emperor in order to assert Korea's independence. He tried to promote the Gwangmu Reform, but failed because of opposition from the general populace and the Japanese.

On 13 October 1897, the proclamation made by Emperor Gojong marks the end of the Joseon period, as the official name of the empire was changed, Korea seals the independence from Qing China. However, the dynasty continued to reign, albeit perturbed by Japanese interventions.

=== Japanese occupation ===
In a complicated series of maneuvers and counter-maneuvers, Japan pushed back a Russian fleet at the Battle of Port Arthur in 1905. After the conclusion of the 1904–1905 Russo-Japanese War with the Treaty of Portsmouth, the way was open for Japan to take control of Korea.

After the signing of the Protectorate Treaty in 1905, Korea became a protectorate of Japan. Itō Hirobumi became the first resident general of Korea. He was assassinated by a Korean independence activist, An Jung-geun, in 1909 at the train station at Harbin.

Following the Protectorate Treaty, Gojong sent representatives to the Hague Peace Convention of 1907 to try to re-assert his sovereignty over Korea. Although the Korean representatives were blocked by the Japanese delegates, they did not give up, and later held interviews with newspapers. The Japanese forced Gojong to abdicate, and his son Sunjong succeeded to the throne.

In 1910, in the face of opposition from many Koreans, the Empire of Japan annexed Korea by force.

== See also ==
- History of Korea
