= Seonbi =

Korean non-governmental scholars

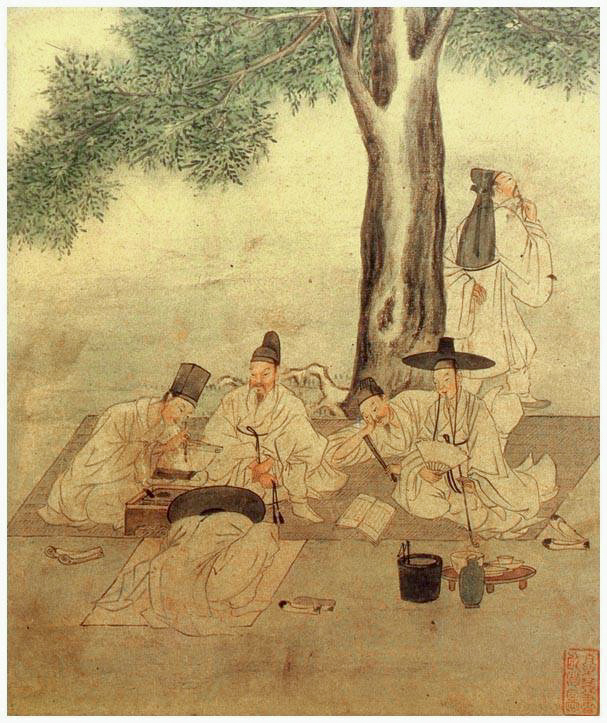
- 18th-century painting of a seonbi composing a poem

Korean name
- Hangul: 선비
- RR: seonbi
- MR: sŏnbi

Seonbi (Korean: 선비) were scholars during the Goryeo and Joseon periods of Korean history. They were generally seen as non-governmental servants of the public, who chose to pass on the benefits and authority of official power in order to develop and share knowledge. However, some former bureaucrats were seen as seonbi, as they moved to the countryside after retirement and adopted the seonbi lifestyle.

Seonbi in the traditional sense do not exist today, although the term is sometimes used metaphorically to describe people. When applied to a person, the meaning can be complimentary, highlighting a person's intelligence, morality, and composure. However, young South Koreans who tend to have low opinions of the Joseon Dynasty or Confucianism, tend to use the word ssib seonbi in a derogatory way, or just call them seonbi (this is more frequent today). It is used pejoratively to the English term "geezer", to mock people acting self-righteous, or to highlight a perceived anachronistic value system.

== Philosophy ==
The seonbi followed a strict code of conduct and believed they had the moral duty to lead society in the right direction. Seonbi were to live life in modesty and perpetual learning in order to attain perfection of character, not only through knowledge but also by adhering to the rightful path. The goal of the seonbi was to achieve social justice.

Seonbi were expected to possess the Confucian virtues of filial piety and loyalty to the king, disdain power, wealth and private interest, and be ready to lay down their life in order to remain faithful to their principles and maintain their integrity. They venerated scholars such as Chŏng Mong-ju (who died for his fidelity to Goryeo), the six martyred ministers (who refused to accept Sejo's usurpation of the throne), and Cho Kwangjo (a reformer who died trying to transform Joseon into an ideal Confucian society) as embodiments of the seonbi spirit and as examples to follow, despite him being a controversial figure today.

Education was of great importance and referred to as "enlightenment", and seonbi gathered and studied at seowon institutions. Seonbi masculinity denotes mental attainment rather than physical performance, and is still valued by many South Koreans and considered by some scholars to be the ideal model of Korean masculinity.

Due to their connotation with the yangban class, the commoners had mixed perceptions of seonbi. Some were regarded as advocates of the laymen, while some were treated equally as the corrupt yangban. Some seonbi submitted blunt petitions to the king despite the dangerous consequences and suffered purges as a result. Some depictions were idealized and romanticized men of honor in contrast to the ruling yangban class, even though seonbi came from the same class. The seonbi were common figures in traditional Korean depictions of the Joseon period. For instance, a seonbi appears as one of the characters in the traditional mask dance preserved at the Hahoe Folk Village, where he competes with a yangban character, often depicted as corrupt and greedy. In some satirical novels, the seonbi are treated similarly as the yangban.

=== Righteous Army ===
As a dictionary definition, a 의병, or righteous army means a paramilitary organization that were mustered by volunteers to prohibit mobs or deter foreign invasions.

Since archery was a liberal arts subject for seonbi in the Joseon Dynasty, many learned archery. Many seonbi were trained in combat and command. Representatively, Kwak Chaeu, Ko Kyŏngmyŏng, and Cho Hŏn led righteous armies in battlefields during the Imjin War.

== Sarim ==
The Sarim faction was a political faction in the Joseon Dynasty that actively sought to realize the political ideology of Neo-Confucianism. Cho Kwangjo is commonly said to be the founder of sarim. Sarim advised the king closely. They studied and enacted political ideas of Neo-Confucianism not only at the theoretical level but also at the practical level, sometimes succeeding in reforms. Sarim often faced persecution, resulting in the Korean literati purges.

== Modern depictions ==
Modern depictions of seonbi in popular media are ubiquitous, with some examples being:

- Lee Joon-gi in the Korean drama The Scholar Who Walks the Night
- Kim Soo-hyun in the Korean drama My Love from the Star
- Bae Yong-joon in the Korean film Untold Scandal
- Cho Jae-hyun in the Korean drama Jeong Do-jeon

== Famous seonbi ==
- Ch'oe Ch'iwŏn
- Choi Ik-hyun
- Chŏng Mong-ju
- Hŏ Kyun
- Cho Sik
- Chŏng Ch'ŏl
- Chŏng Tojŏn
- Chŏng Yagyong
- Cho Kwangjo
- Kim Chŏnghŭi
- Kim Su-hang
- Pak Chiwŏn
- Sŏ Kyŏngdŏk
- Sŏng Hon
- Song Ikp'il
- Song Chun-gil
- Song Si-yŏl
- Yi Ki
- Yi Hang-no
- Yi Hwang
- Yi I
- Yi Sugwang
- Yun Sŏndo

== See also ==
- Korean culture
- Korean Confucianism
- Silhak
- Neo-Confucianism
- Yangban
