= Chŏng Yŏrip =

Korean politician (1546–1589)

- Hangul: 정여립
- Hanja: 鄭汝立
- RR: Jeong Yeorip
- MR: Chŏng Yŏrip

Art name
- Hangul: 죽도
- Hanja: 竹島
- RR: Jukdo
- MR: Chukto

Courtesy name
- Hangul: 인백
- Hanja: 仁伯
- RR: Inbaek
- MR: Inbaek

Chŏng Yŏrip (Korean: 정여립; Hanja: 鄭汝立; 1546–1589) was a Korean politician of the Joseon period. His art name was Chukto, and his courtesy name was Inbaek.

Chŏng was born in 1546 to a yangban (noble) family in Jeonju-bu, North Jeolla Province. When he was young, he was a disciple of Yi I and Sŏng Hon. In 1567 he achieved the rank of chinsa, and in 1570 he passed the munkwa examination, in 1583 the rank of assistant section chief in the Ministry of Rites, and in the following year he was promoted to such'an.

Politically, he was initially a Westerner, but later joined the Eastern faction. He was heavily attacked by the Westerners for criticizing his former teacher Yi I. His criticisms caused the displeasure of King Seonjo, who compared him to Xing Shu (邢恕) of the Song Dynasty who was widely believed to have betrayed his teacher, Cheng Hao.

Following this, he resigned from the government and returned to his hometown, Jeonju, where he conducted academic research and formed an armed organization, Taedonggye (대동계; 大同契), to oppose Japanese pirates. The Taedonggye met monthly and trained in archery and other forms of combat. In 1587, the Taedonggye was powerful enough to defeat a group of pirates when the Jeonju magistrate's governmental army could not. The Westerners claimed that the formation of Taedonggye was a plot against the king and a rebellion, while the Easterners countered, accusing the Westerners of slander. In 1589, as a result of the reported rebellion, he fled to Jukdo Island, and committing suicide when government forces closed in on him.

== See also ==
- Chŏng Yŏrip Conspiracy Case, Imprisonment or Treason?
- Daedonggye (同禊)
- 1589 rebellion of Chŏng Yŏrip

== Popular culture ==
- Portrayed by Ahn Nae-sang in the 2004–2005 KBS1 TV series Immortal Admiral Yi Sun-sin.
- Portrayed by Choi Cheol-ho in the 2014 KBS2 TV series The King's Face.
