= Kim Chong-jik =

Korean scholar-official (1431–1492)

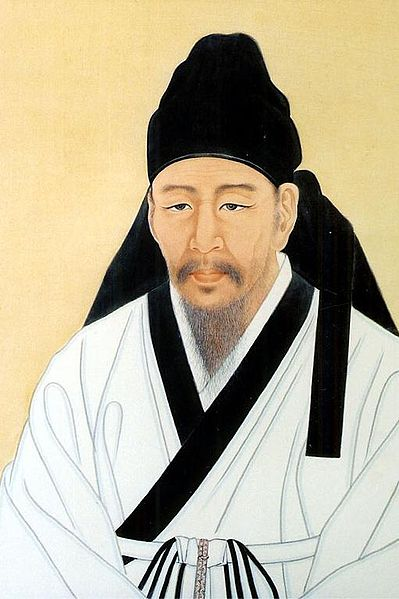
- Born: June 1431; Miryang, Gyeongsang Province, Joseon
- Died: August 19, 1492 (aged 61)
- Occupation: Scholar-official
- Parents: Kim Suk-ja (father); Lady Pak (mother)

- Kim Chong-jik
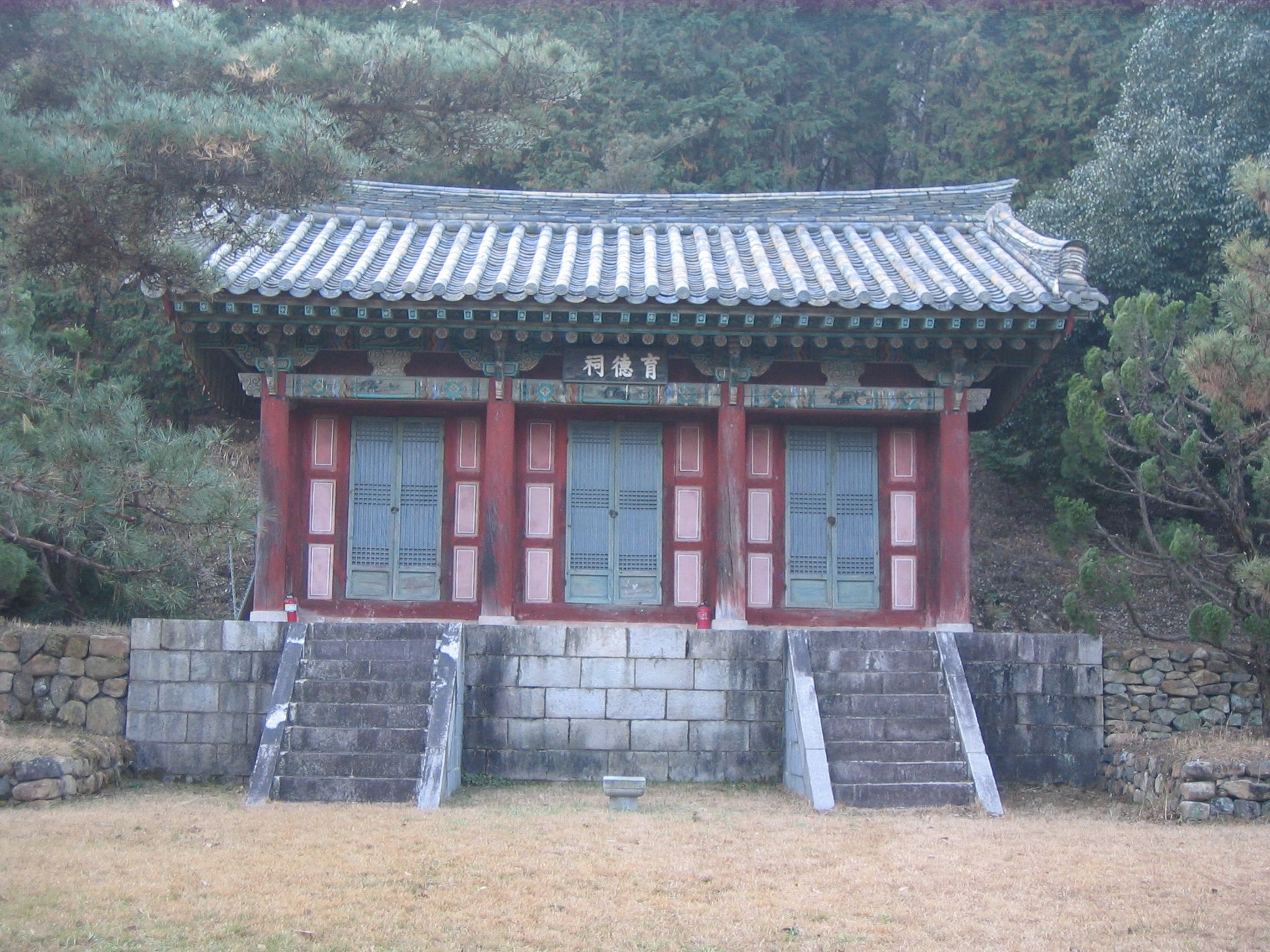
- Shrine to Kim Chong-jik in Miryang

Korean name
- Hangul: 김종직
- Hanja: 金宗直
- RR: Gim Jongjik
- MR: Kim Chongjik

Art name
- Hangul: 점필재
- Hanja: 佔畢齋
- RR: Jeompiljae
- MR: Chŏmp'ilchae

Courtesy name
- Hangul: 계온, 효관
- Hanja: 季昷, 孝盥
- RR: Gyeon, Hyogwan
- MR: Kyeon, Hyogwan

Posthumous name
- Hangul: 문충
- Hanja: 文忠
- RR: Munchung
- MR: Munch'ung

Kim Chong-jik (Korean: 김종직; Hanja: 金宗直; June 1431 – August 19, 1492), often known by his art name Chŏmp'ilchae (점필재), was a leading Korean Neo-Confucian scholar in the early Joseon period. He was born in Miryang in Gyeongsang Province, to a yangban family of the Seonsan Kim clan. He passed the jinsa literary licentiate examination in 1453 and the higher examination in 1459.

After passing the examination, Kim entered government service, holding a wide range of positions. He earned the special favor of King Seongjong, as well as the enmity of the Hungu (Loyal Retainers) faction.

After his death, Kim Chong-jik's writings became the basis for the First literati purge of 1498 under the rule of Yeonsangun. His students included Kim Il-son who was killed in the first literati purge, and Kim Koeng-p'il, who was killed in the subsequent Second literati purge of 1504 along with many others. Kim Chong-jik's memory was later rehabilitated, and he was enshrined in various seowon including Yerim Seowon in Miryang and Geumo Seowon in Gumi.

== Family ==
- Father – Kim Suk-ja (김숙자; 金叔滋; 24 August 1389 – 2 March 1456)
- Mother - Lady Pak of the Miryang Pak clan (밀양 박씨; 28 November 1400 – 21 December 1479)
- Sibling(s)
  - Older half-brother - Kim Chong-bo (김종보; 金宗輔)
  - Older half-brother - Kim Chong-ik (김종익; 金宗翼)
  - Older half-sister - Lady Kim of the Seonsan Kim clan (선산 김씨; 善山 金氏)
  - Older half-sister - Lady Kim of the Seonsan Kim clan (선산 김씨; 善山 金氏)
  - Older brother - Kim Chong-sŏk (김종석; 金宗碩; 23 November - March 1460)
  - Older brother - Kim Chong-yu (김종유; 金宗裕)
  - Younger sister - Lady Kim of the Seonsan Kim clan (선산 김씨; 善山 金氏)
- Wives and their issue
  - Lady Cho of the Changnyeong Cho clan (창녕 조씨); daughter of Cho Kye-mun (울진현령 조계문; 曺繼文)
    - Son - Kim Eok (김억; 金繶)
    - Daughter - Lady Kim of the Seonsan Kim clan (선산 김씨; 善山 金氏)
    - Son - Kim Kon (김곤; 金緄)
    - Son - Kim Tam (김담; 金紞)
    - Daughter - Lady Kim of the Seonsan Kim clan (선산 김씨; 善山 金氏)
  - Lady Mun of the Nampyeong Mun clan (남평 문씨; 南平 文氏); daughter of Mun Kŭk-jŏng (첨정 문극정; 文克貞)
    - Son - Kim Sung-nyŏn (김숭년; 金嵩年)
    - Daughter - Lady Kim of the Seonsan Kim clan (선산 김씨; 善山 金氏)

== Works ==
- Jeompiljaejip (점필재집; 佔畢齋集)
- Cheonggupunga (청구풍아; 靑丘風雅)
- Dongmunsu (동문수; 東文粹)
- Danghuilgi (당후일기)
- Yuduyurok (유두유록; 遊頭流錄)
- Gihaengrok (기행록; 紀行錄)

== See also ==
- Korean literati purges
- Politics of the Joseon dynasty
- List of Korean philosophers
- Korean Confucianism
- Nam Kon
- Cho Kwangjo
