= Korean literati purges =

Late 15th–16th century purges

Literati purges is a translation of the Korean term sahwa (Korean: 사화 士禍), which literally translates to "scholars' calamity." It refers to a series of political purges in the late 15th and 16th centuries in which Sarim scholars suffered persecution at the hands of their political rivals.

The politics of the Middle Joseon Dynasty were primarily marked by a power struggle between two social groups within the yangban aristocracy. The incumbent faction consisted of the "Meritorious Subjects," who were rewarded for assisting in the establishment of Joseon against the former Goryeo dynasty, alongside subsequent accomplishments. Referred to as the Hungu faction (Hungupa, 훈구파, 勳舊派), they held key positions in the State Council and the Six Ministries that carried out state affairs. The newcomers were the Sarim faction (Sarimpa, 사림파, 士林派), who belonged to the neo-Confucian school of Kim Chong-jik and other thinkers. Sarim scholars generally shunned the royal court and studied neo-Confucianism in rural provinces, particularly after King Sejo's usurpation of the throne in 1455.

During the reign of King Seongjong, Sarim scholars began to occupy key positions in what was known as the "Three Offices" (Samsa, 삼사), the collective name for three government watchdog organizations: the Office of Inspector General (Sahŏnbu, 사헌부, 司憲府), whose main role was to impeach government officials for corrupt or improper actions; the Office of Censors (Saganwŏn, 사간원, 司諫院), tasked with criticizing the improper actions and policies of the king and ministers; and the Office of Special Advisors (Hongmun'gwan), which oversaw the royal library and served as a research institute to study Confucian philosophy and advise the king.

Using the Samsa as a stronghold, Sarim scholars challenged the power of the central government and the Hungu faction, impeaching them for alleged corruption or impropriety. The subsequent conflict between these two factions resulted in violent purges in 1498, 1504, 1519, and 1545, which followed a specific pattern. These were among the political purges that occurred in Joseon from 1453 to 1722, traditionally twelve in number.

While the Sarim faction lost each of the four primary confrontations, its moral influence continued to increase, eventually eclipsing the Hungu faction.

== First literati purge of 1498 ==
The first and second literati purges took place during the reign of Yeonsangun, successor to Seongjong. The First Literati Purge of 1498, also called Muo Sahwa (무오사화, 戊午士禍/戊午史禍), began as a personal grudge held by Yi Kukdon against Kim Ilson, who had previously impeached him. Both were assigned to compile records related to King Seongjong's reign for the Veritable Records of the Joseon Dynasty. Kim Ilson, a disciple of Kim Chong-jik, included in the compilation the latter's writing that was critical of King Sejo's usurpation. (Kim Chong-jik had written a lamentation regarding Xiang Yu's murder of Emperor Yi of Chu in early Chinese history after learning of Danjong's death by order of King Sejo.) When Yi Kukdon, Kim Ilson's superior, discovered this, he used it to seek political retribution. Kim Ilson and other followers of Kim Chong-jik were accused of treason by the Hungu faction, many of whom originally gained power through their support of Sejo. Because Yeonsangun's lineage traced back to King Sejo, the Sarim faction's view of Sejo's usurpation was considered treasonous. Yeonsangun, who opposed academic oversight and sought to weaken the Three Offices, used the opportunity to purge the Sarim scholars. Kim Ilson and two others, Kwŏn Obok (권오복; 權五福) and Kwŏn Kyŏngyu, were sentenced to death by lingchi, while three others were beheaded. Kim Chong-jik's remains were exhumed and posthumously beheaded, and at least 18 other scholars were exiled. Yeonsangun ordered all court officials to witness the executions, mandating that those who abstained or turned away be reported for punishment.

== Second literati purge of 1504 ==
The Second Literati Purge of 1504, or Kapja Sahwa (갑자사화, 甲子士禍), occurred after Yeonsangun discovered that his biological mother was not Queen Jung-hyeon but the Deposed Queen Yun, who had been executed by poison in 1482 for allegedly poisoning one of Seongjong's concubines and injuring Seongjong's face. Yeonsangun was informed of the details surrounding his mother's death and presented with a piece of clothing purportedly stained with her blood. In response, he executed two of Seongjong's concubines and ordered the execution of officials who had supported Yun's death sentence. This event affected both the Hungu and remaining Sarim factions indiscriminately, including the instigators of the first purge. At least 36 officials were executed by poison, and the remains of eight deceased officials were posthumously mutilated. The total death toll was higher, as the victims' families and relatives were also punished; male relatives were executed, and female relatives were enslaved. A total of 239 officials were executed, exiled, or dismissed. Yeonsangun was eventually deposed by the remaining Hungu officials, and his half-brother Jungjong ascended the throne as the eleventh king of Joseon in 1506.

== Third literati purge of 1519 ==
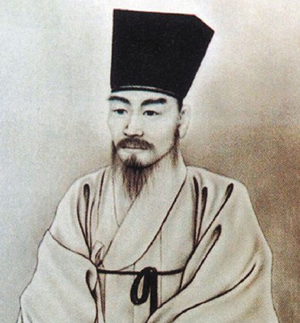
Cho Kwangjo

The Third Literati Purge of 1519, also called Kimyo Sahwa (기묘사화, 己卯士禍), remains a much-analyzed event in Joseon history because the Sarim faction held substantial political power and was actively implementing significant institutional reforms at the time of its purge.

Jungjong worked to reverse the administrative excesses of Yeonsangun and return the state to Seongjong's administrative standards, but his royal authority was limited by the powerful presence of the coup leaders who had placed him on the throne. After the three primary leaders of the coup died of natural causes eight years into his reign, Jungjong began to assert his authority and sought ways to restrain the Hungu faction's power. He aligned with Cho Kwangjo, a young leader of the Sarim faction, who became a trusted official. Cho enjoyed the confidence of Jungjong, to the extent that the king abandoned a planned military campaign because of Cho's sole opposition. With Jungjong's backing, Cho rose through a series of rapid promotions to become Inspector General within four years of entering politics, bringing numerous young Sarim scholars from rural provinces into the royal court. Under his leadership, the Sarim faction advanced a series of reforms: establishing a local self-government system called Hyang'yak; pursuing land reforms to distribute land more equitably; promulgating Confucian texts via vernacular translations; and working to reduce the population of slaves. Cho advocated that talented individuals, regardless of their social class, should be eligible for government appointments. According to the Veritable Records of the Joseon Dynasty, bribery and corruption subsided significantly during this period because of strict enforcement by the Inspector General's Office. Contemporary philosopher Yi I noted that Cho was highly regarded by the general public.

However, these radical reforms generated fierce hostility and resistance from the Hungu faction. Cho also made political enemies by impeaching several prominent figures of the 1506 coup. When Cho argued that many registered contributors to the 1506 coup had not actually participated and successfully revoked their special privileges (including tax exemptions and stipends), the Hungu faction began to plot his downfall. In early 1519, an initial plot by Hungu officials to assassinate Sarim figures was discovered and neutralized.

=== "Cho will become king" ===
Cho's uncompromising character and frequent remonstrations regarding his radical programs began to strain his relationship with the king. Furthermore, Consort Gyeong of the Pak clan and Consort Hui of the Hong clan (daughter of Hungu leader Hong Kyŏngju) sought to alienate Jungjong from Cho Kwangjo by questioning Cho's loyalty and claiming that popular support was shifting toward him. At the behest of Hong Kyŏngju, Minister of Rites Nam Kon, and Sim Chŏng, they informed Jungjong of public rumors stating that Cho Kwangjo was the de facto ruler of the country and that the populace desired him as king.

According to the Veritable Records of the Joseon Dynasty, Nam Kon slandered Cho by writing the phrase "Chu ch'o will become the king" (주초위왕, 走肖爲王) with honey or sugar water on mulberry leaves so that caterpillars would eat through the leaves, leaving the phrase behind. When the two Hanja characters "chu" (走) and "ch'o" (肖) are combined, they form the character "cho" (趙), which was Cho Kwangjo's family name. Consort Hong and Consort Pak presented the leaves to Jungjong, claiming they were a heavenly warning that Cho would seize the throne after eliminating the Hungu faction. Jungjong, who had ascended the throne via a coup d'état, grew suspicious of Cho Kwangjo. (A similar linguistic phenomenon occurred during the fall of the Goryeo dynasty, where the phrase "Son of wood will gain the country" (목자득국 木子得國) was popularized; the characters for wood (木) and son (子) combine to form "yi" (李), the surname of Yi Sŏnggye.)

Believing Jungjong was sufficiently estranged from Cho, Hong Kyŏngju secretly entered the palace to warn the king that the court was dominated by Cho's supporters. When Cho petitioned Jungjong to revoke the special privileges of individuals who had falsely claimed credit for the 1506 coup, Jungjong's suspicions increased. Jungjong dispatched a secret letter to Hong Kyŏngju, expressing concern that Cho Kwangjo might next question the legitimacy of the coup that brought him to power. On November 15, 1519, Hungu leaders entered the palace at night, bypassing the Royal Secretariat, to present written charges against Cho, claiming he and his supporters had deceived the king, formed a clique, and disrupted state order by abusing their positions. Cho Kwangjo, Justice Minister Kim Chŏng, and six others were immediately arrested.

=== "What is their crime?" ===
The arrested officials faced immediate execution, but War Minister Yi Changgon requested that the cabinet be consulted before a final decision was reached. The subsequent cabinet meeting regarding Cho's fate is recorded in detail in the Veritable Records of the Joseon Dynasty. Most officials expressed surprise at the arrests and Jungjong's intent to execute them. They argued that while Cho may have been extreme in his youthful zeal to reform the country, he lacked treasonous intent. Chief State Councillor Chŏng Kwangp'il, who had regularly clashed with Cho, entreated the king against the executions, stating that punishing Cho and others without definitive evidence would damage the king's reputation. Eighteen younger officials requested to be imprisoned alongside Cho Kwangjo, and even Hong Suk, the newly appointed Justice Minister who interrogated Cho, reported that he believed Cho was genuinely loyal.

The new Inspector General, Yu Un (유운; 柳雲), protested the secret nature of the proceedings, arguing that any punishment should be dealt with openly and justly rather than through nighttime decrees. Meanwhile, 150 Seonggyungwan students gathered at the palace to protest the arrests, later growing to 240 students who petitioned for his innocence. This public outpouring of support increased Jungjong's anxiety regarding Cho's influence. Chief State Councillor Chŏng, Deputy State Councillor An Tang, and War Minister Yi Changgon were subsequently removed from office for opposing the executions.

=== Purge of Sarim scholars ===
Cho Kwangjo had been caught off guard by the shift in royal favor, as the Sarim faction had successfully secured the revocation of special statuses for 70 Hungu officials just four days prior. He maintained confidence that he could prove his loyalty if granted an audience, but he was denied access to the king. Amid ongoing petitions for leniency, Jungjong initially commuted the death sentence to exile, sending Cho to Neung-ju. Less than a month later, however, Jungjong dismissed the ministers who had advocated for Cho and reinstated the death sentence by poison. Before executing the order, Cho wrote a death poem declaring his loyalty and bowed toward the palace.

Kim Chŏng and three others were also executed in 1520, and dozens of Sarim scholars were exiled. Many others resigned from the central government in protest and retreated to rural provinces. In 1521, An Tang's son was accused of plotting to assassinate Nam Kon and Sim Chŏng, resulting in the execution of a dozen individuals, including An Tang. In total, 225 officials were affected by the purge, and most of Cho's reforms were rescinded. Ultimately, while Jungjong and Cho Kwangjo shared a reformist agenda, Jungjong prioritized reinforcing royal authority, whereas Cho focused on a neo-Confucian ideology that sought to restrict the monarch's actions via classical teachings.

The Third Literati Purge of 1519 was viewed by later generations of scholars as a missed opportunity to establish an ideal neo-Confucian state, as Joseon politics subsequently shifted toward factional conflicts among royal in-laws. Its victims were later venerated as Confucian martyrs, while the instigators were heavily criticized in historical literature. Nam Kon regretted his role in the purge late in life and requested that his writings be burned; very little of his work survives today.

== Fourth literati purge of 1545 ==
When Jungjong died in 1544 and Crown Prince Injong ascended the throne, he rehabilitated Cho Kwangjo and appointed Yi Ŏnjŏk alongside other prominent Sarim scholars to high positions. However, Injong died eight months later, resulting in the twelve-year-old Myeongjong becoming king. His mother, Queen Munjeong, served as regent, and her brother, Yun Wŏnhyŏng, amassed significant political power. Yun Wŏnhyŏng accused his rival Yun Im and his supporters of plotting to place a different prince on the throne after Injong's death. This accusation led to the Fourth Literati Purge of 1545 (Eulsa Sahwa, 을사사화, 乙巳士禍), in which Yun Im, the prince, and nine supporters—including several Sarim scholars—were executed. Yun Wŏnhyŏng continued to purge political rivals and Sarim scholars over the next five years, resulting in a death toll exceeding one hundred, alongside numerous exiles (including Yi Ŏnjŏk). Following Queen Munjeong's death in 1565, Myeongjong exiled Yun Wŏnhyŏng, who died later that year.

=== Power struggle of in-laws ===
Unlike the prior purges, the Fourth Literati Purge of 1545 was primarily a power struggle between maternal relatives of competing royal princes. Following Cho Kwangjo's fall, factions led by Nam Kon, Sim Chŏng, and Kim Allo competed for influence. Kim Allo was initially exiled but returned to successfully drive out Sim Chŏng, who was accused of accepting bribes from Consort Pak to alter the royal succession. Kim Allo later framed Sim Chŏng and Consort Pak for treason after a mutilated rat was found hanging in the crown prince's palace. Consort Pak, her son Prince Bongseong, and Sim Chŏng were executed. Kim Allo ran a strict political regime until he attempted to depose Queen Munjeong, which resulted in his downfall and execution in 1537.

Following Kim Allo's execution, a power vacuum developed between Injong's maternal uncle, Yun Im (the "Greater Yun" faction), and Queen Munjeong's brothers, Yun Wŏllo and Yun Wŏnhyŏng (the "Lesser Yun" faction). Jungjong had continuously brought Sarim scholars back into the court to balance the Hungu faction. Many of these scholars aligned with the Greater Yun faction because of high expectations for Injong's rule, leaving them vulnerable when the Lesser Yun faction seized control under Myeongjong's regency.

== Aftermath ==
The four major purges severely reduced the presence of the Sarim faction within the central government, prompting many to return to rural villages where they established private academies called seowon. Prominent philosophers such as Yi Hwang, Jo Sik, Sŏ Kyŏngdŏk, and Sŏng Such'im largely avoided political appointments during this period in protest of the purges.

Despite their removal from the capital, the Sarim faction maintained structural strength in the provinces via the seowon networks and the Hyang'yak system. By the reign of King Seonjo, the Sarim faction had regained institutional control of the central government and remained a dominant force in Joseon politics.

== Modern reinterpretation ==
The traditional narrative of the literati purges heavily reflects the historical viewpoints compiled by the Sarim faction, who eventually authored most of the surviving records and the Veritable Records of the Joseon Dynasty. Modern historians frequently analyze the purges as structural conflicts between Joseon monarchs seeking absolute authority and an aristocratic class trying to bind royal power within a neo-Confucian philosophical framework. Because Sarim scholars frequently populated the watchdog roles within the Three Offices, conflict with high-ranking ministers and the crown was structurally common. Some modern analyses suggest the sharp ideological distinctions drawn between the Sarim and Hungu factions may be exaggerated, with family networks playing an equal or greater role in political alignment than pure philosophy.

== Other purges ==
Following the events of 1545, subsequent political conflicts occurred between competing court factions, but these are distinct from the primary sahwa (literati purges), a term historically reserved for the specific conflict between the Sarim and Hungu factions. Later incidents are classified under terms such as oksa (treason cases), hwanguk (sudden shifts in governing power), or bakhae (persecutions). A notable example is the Treason Case of 1589 (Gichuk Oksa), which involved infighting entirely within the Sarim faction after they had attained power.

- Oksa (Treason Cases)
  - Shinsa Muok (1521): Cho Kwangjo's remaining supporters were executed on charges of plotting to assassinate Nam Kon and Sim Chŏng. It is often categorized as an extension of the Third Literati Purge.
  - Gichuk Oksa (Treason Case of 1589): A severe purge in Joseon history in which the Western faction targeted the rival Eastern faction, resulting in approximately 1,000 executions or exiles.
  - Gyechuk Oksa (1613): Under Gwanghaegun, the Greater Northern faction purged the Lesser Northern faction over an alleged succession plot.
  - Shinyim Oksa (1721–1722): Noron faction leaders advocating for the regency of Prince Yeoning (later Yeongjo) were executed following accusations of disloyalty by the Soron and Namin factions.
  - Eulhae Oksa (1755): A reactionary purge targeting members of the Soron faction after Yeongjo ascended the throne.
- Hwanguk (Shifts in Power)
  - Gyeonshin Hwanguk (1680): The Western faction successfully accused the Southern faction of treasonous plotting under Sukjong.
  - Gisa Hwanguk (1689): The Western faction lost power, and scholars like Song Si-yŏl were executed after opposing the designation of the crown prince.
  - Gapsul Hwanguk (1694): An attempt by the Southern faction to clear the Western faction collapsed, permanently reducing the Southern faction's political influence.
- Bakhae (Persecutions)
  - Sinhae Bakhae (1791): The initial state crackdowns on Catholicism in Korea, driven by the conservative Byeokpa faction.
  - Shinyu Bakhae (1801): Following the death of King Jeongjo, Queen Jeongsun implemented a broad purge against Korean Catholics, which doubled as a political tool to dismantle the liberal Shipa and Southern factions. Approximately 300 people were executed, and scholar Chŏng Yagyong was exiled.
  - Gihae Bakhae (1839): A resurgence of anti-Catholic executions following a shift in factional control back to the Byeokpa.

== Depictions in Korean mass media ==
The literati purges serve as frequent subject matter for South Korean historical television dramas and films:

- In Dae Jang Geum (2003), the protagonist's father is depicted as a victim of the second purge, and subsequent plots link characters to the third purge.
- In Immortal Admiral Yi Sun-sin (2004–2005), Yi Sun-shin's ancestral family is portrayed as suffering political fallout from the third purge.
- The film The Treacherous (2015) dramatizes the political environment surrounding the second literati purge.
- The television dramas Ladies of the Palace (2001) and King and Queen (1998–2000) heavily cover the events of the first, second, and third purges.

== Sources ==
- Wagner, Edward Willett (1974). The literati purges: political conflict in early Yi Korea. Harvard East Asian monographs. 238 pages. East Asian Research Center : distributed by Harvard University Press. ISBN 9780674536180. LCCN 74021777. Republication of a 1959 thesis
- Pratt, Keith L.; Rutt, Richard; Hoare, James E. (1999). Korea, A Historical and Cultural Dictionary. Durham East Asia Series. 568 pages. Routledge. ISBN 978-0-7007-0463-7.
