= Cho Kwangjo =

Korean Neo-Confucian scholar (1482–1520)

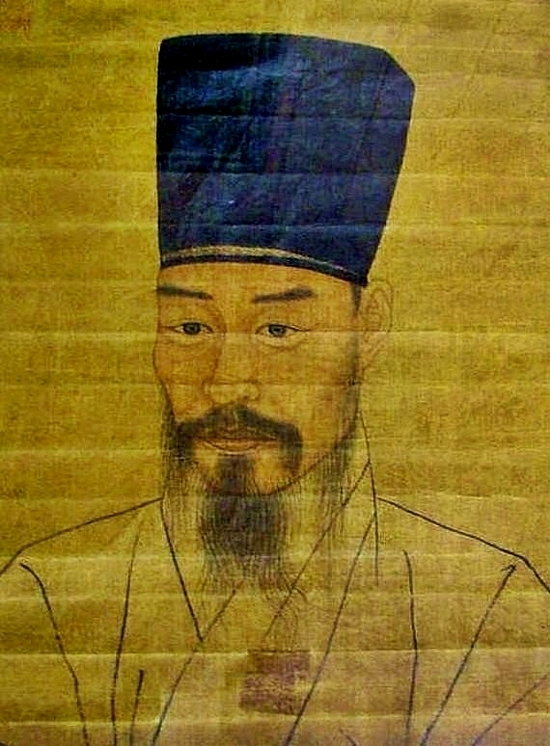

Korean name
- Hangul: 조광조
- Hanja: 趙光祖
- RR: Jo Gwangjo
- MR: Cho Kwangjo

Art name
- Hangul: 정암
- Hanja: 靜庵
- RR: Jeongam
- MR: Chŏngam

Courtesy name
- Hangul: 효직
- Hanja: 孝直
- RR: Hyojik
- MR: Hyojik

Posthumous name
- Hangul: 문정
- Hanja: 文正
- RR: Munjeong
- MR: Munjŏng

Cho Kwangjo (Korean: 조광조; Hanja: 趙光祖, 23 August 1482 – 10 January 1520), also called by his art name Chŏngam (정암), was a Korean Neo-Confucian scholar who pursued radical reforms during the reign of Jungjong of Joseon in the early 16th century.

He was framed with charges of factionalism by the power elite that opposed his reform measures and was sentenced to drink poison in the Third Literati Purge of 1519. He has been widely venerated as a Confucian martyr and an embodiment of "seonbi spirit" by later generations in Korea. Some historians consider him one of the most influential figures in 16th century Korea. He is known as one of the 18 Sages of Korea (동방18현) and is enshrined in the Munmyo.

== Biography ==
=== Early years ===
Cho Kwangjo was the son of Cho Wŏngang (조원강; 趙元綱) and was from the Hanyang Cho clan. Cho studied under the Neo-Confucian scholar Kim Koengp'il, Kim Chong-jik's disciple who was in exile at the time following the First Literati Purge of 1498. When Kim Koengp'il was later executed (by poison) following the Second Literati Purge of 1504, Cho was exiled for being Kim's disciple.

At this time, Joseon Dynasty politics were primarily marked by the power struggle between two aristocratic yangban factions - the established "Hungu" power elites who were generally conservative and the upstart Sarim scholars called seonbis, who belonged to the Neo-Confucian school of Kim Chong-jik and other thinkers. The Sarim faction had entered court politics during the reign of King Seongjong in the late 15th century but suffered two bloody purges under his successor Yeonsangun. When Yeonsangun was eventually deposed in 1506, Jungjong was placed on the throne as the eleventh king of Joseon by the Hungu leaders who led the coup. For first ten years of his reign, Jungjong could not truly rule the country with regal authority (he was forced to depose his faithful queen because her father was killed by the coup leaders, and they feared that the queen might take revenge.) However, three main coup leaders died of natural causes by then, and Jungjong began to welcome Sarim scholars to his court to check the Hungu faction's power. The Sarim faction considered the Hungu faction as a whole as greedy and corrupt men unworthy of respect and sought to establish an ideal neo-Confucian society. Indeed, many of coup leaders had enjoyed Yeonsangun's favor during most of his reign, and their leader Pak Wŏnjong led the coup mainly for personal revenge for his older sister who had rumors of adultery.

Cho Kwangjo came from a prominent family that belonged to the Hungu faction but was called "crazy man" and "source of disaster" by people around him for studying neo-Confucianism under exiled Sarim scholar Kim Koengp'il at the height of persecution of the Sarim faction. In 1510, Cho passed the kwagŏ exam and became a student at the Sungkyunkwan. He was often recommended for a court position by high officials and fellow students at the Sungkyunkwan, but he delayed entering civil service to pursue further study until 1515, when he was recommended to King Jungjong by Minister of Personnel An Tang along with 200 Sungkyunkwan students and was immediately appointed to a position of junior sixth rank. However, he was ashamed to take office with others' help and took Al-seung-si exam, and his essay caught Jungjong's attention.

By then, Cho was already known for his unbending and outspoken character as he soon emerged as the leader of the Sarim faction. For instance, when he became a jung-un, lowest position at Office of Censors, the first thing he did on the following day was to petition the king to fire all his superiors at the Office of Censors and Office of Inspector General. At the time, two Sarim officials had petitioned the king to restore status of the deposed queen, who was deposed by the Hungu faction. The Office of Inspector General and Office of Censors had them exiled for their impertinent petition. Cho argued that two offices violated their given function by suppressing free speech and petitioned the king to fire his superiors or accept his resignation since he could not work with them. To the surprise of everyone, Jungjong replaced everyone in two offices except Cho. This event reflected Jungjong's complete trust and confidence in Cho, who rose in a series of unprecedented promotions from rank of junior sixth rank to junior second rank in only three years.

=== Cho's reforms ===
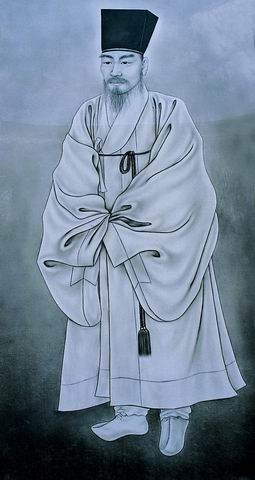
Body portrait of Cho

King Jungjong wanted to bring new talents to the royal court that was dominated by the Hungu faction, and Cho complied by introducing a new system of government recruitment via recommendations that were based on the candidates' moral character as well as scholarship. He argued that existing officer examination were too philosophical and placed too much emphasis on literary skills, detached from the practical needs of the government. The supplementary recommendation examination that Cho introduced was called an "examination of the Sage and Good" (현량과; 賢良科; hyŏllyang-kwa). This was an abbreviated examination for candidates recommended by local magistrates as men of highest integrity in the presence of the king, who chose the winning candidates. This system allowed Cho to recruit many talented Sarim scholars who had been living a secluded life in rural provinces. However, it also left him open to Hungu faction's attack.

Cho and his supporters then pushed forth a series of radical reforms as they established local self-government system called Hyang'yak to strengthen local autonomy and communal spirit among people. In this system, deference was placed according to seniority of villagers rather than their social status. The Sarim faction also sought to reduce gap between the rich and poor with a land reform that would distribute land to farmers equally and limit amount of land and number of slaves that one could own. This measure also targeted Hungu faction's accumulation of land and wealth.

Deeply influenced by Zhu Xi's neo-Confucianism, Cho believed that ideal world of mythical Chinese Emperor Yao and Shun, could be achieved if all people from the king down to the low-born became morally refined and followed Confucius' teachings. The Sarim faction therefore promulgated Confucian writings among the populace by translating them in Korean hangul and distributing them widely. They also suppressed Buddhism and Taoism as superstitious religions by destroying the royal Taoist temple and confiscating properties of Buddhist temples. As Inspector General, he impeached many officials for corruption and bribery. According to the Veritable Records of the Joseon Dynasty, it was said that no official dared to receive a bribe or exploit the populace during this time because of such strict enforcement. He also sought to trim the size of government by reducing the number of bureaucrats and their wages.

Cho also believed that any talented people including slaves should be appointed as officials regardless of social status. He was said to judge people by moral character and did not greet superior officials if he considered them of unworthy characters while he was courteous even to his servants. For instance, he formed a friendship with a butcher/tanner of lowest class (baekjeong) who did not even have a name and admired his learning so much that he discussed state affairs with him and wanted to appoint him as a court official. But the tanner repeatedly refused Cho's offer and then disappeared without a trace according to the Narratives of Yŏllyŏsil (연려실기술; 燃藜室記述; Yŏllyŏsil kisul), a collection of official and unofficial history books compiled by Yi Kŭng'ik (이긍익; 李肯翊) in late Joseon Dynasty. (It is said that King Injong, Jungjong's successor who admired his tutor Cho, listed the "tanner" as Chief State Councillor for his future cabinet for he was greatly admired by Cho.) According to famous Korean philosopher Yi I, Cho was admired so much by populace that when he appeared on streets people gathered before him saying, "Our master is coming."

=== Sarim's Power Base ===
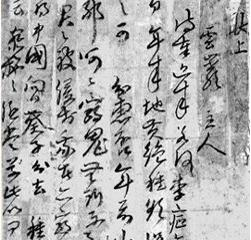
Letter of Cho Kwangjo

Cho's radical reforms were popular with the populace, who called him the "living Buddha", but he faced fierce opposition and hostility from the Hungu faction. In early 1519, several Hungu officials began a plot to assassinate Sarim officials, though they were discovered in time. Cho's power base was concentrated in four offices: Office of the Inspector-General, Office of Censors (사간원; whose role was to criticize wrong policies of the king or ministers), the Office of Special Advisors, and the Royal Secretariat. The first three offices were collectively called Three Offices, or Samsa (삼사), as they provided checks and balance on the power of the king and the ministers and also served as organ of press that influenced general opinion of the court.

However, the Sarim faction did not control any army nor had financial base. Sarim's power was solely dependent on the king's support, which Cho believed to be steadfast in their mutual pursuit of reforms. However, Cho's unbending character and his frequent remonstrations to Jungjong to support his radical programs began to irritate the king. Even when he disagreed with Cho, Jungjong almost always ended up adopting Cho's petition because Cho would refuse to bend his will, and the Three Offices would threaten to resign en masse. Furthermore, Cho and Hongmun'gwan officials often instructed Jungjong on the ways of king in long lessons. Because Jungjong was not a crown prince, he had not received thorough royal education expected of future king, and Sarim scholars sought to rectify this, believing that only learning could prevent a despot like Yeonsangun. Jungjong began to feel hounded by his subjects and resented it.

The Hungu faction, which sensed Jungjong's irritation with Cho, found an opportunity to strike Sarim faction when Cho decided to go after the "heroes" of the 1506 coup that brought Jungjong to power. According to Cho, many officials who were awarded with special privileges including tax exemptions and huge stipends did not actually contribute much to the coup but gained their status through bribes or familial connections. He petitioned Jungjong to revoke such status from two thirds out of 110 people who received special status in connection with the coup. This move infuriated the Hungu faction, and they soon after proceeded to frame Cho with charges of disloyalty.

=== "Cho will become the King" ===
At the behest of Hungu leaders including Hong Kyŏngju, Nam Kon, and Sim Chŏng, Royal Noble Consort Gyeong of Miryang Pak clan (Pak Wŏnjong's adoptive daughter) and Royal Noble Consort Hui of Namyang Hong clan (Hong Kyŏngju's daughter) sought to estrange Jungjong and Cho by often questioning Cho's loyalty and claiming that popular support was shifting to Cho. They told Jungjong that people were saying that it was actually Cho who ruled the country, and that populace wanted to make him their king. Even if Cho was not disloyal, he would not be able to stop his supporters from doing so, they said.

According to Annals of Joseon Dynasty, Nam Kon now set out to slander Cho and wrote a phrase "Chu ch'o will become the king" (주초위왕; 走肖爲王)" with honey or sugary water on mulberry leaves so that caterpillars ate the leaves, leaving behind such phrases on leaves in the palace. When two hanja (Chinese) characters "chu"(走) and "ch'o"(肖) are put together, they form a new Hanja character "cho"(趙), Cho's family name. Consort Hong or Consort Park showed the leaf to Jungjong and claimed that this was the heaven's warning that Cho would take the throne himself after eliminating the Hungu faction. Jungjong, who himself rose to the throne through a coup d'état, began to distrust Cho. When the Goryeo dynasty fell and was replaced by the Joseon dynasty, there was a popular saying "Son of wood will gain the country" (목자득국; 木子得國). When two Hanja characters meaning wood (木) and son (子) are combined, they form a new character "Yi" (李), which happens to be the family name of Yi Sŏnggye, who deposed the last king of Goryeo and founded the Joseon dynasty. These phrases helped Yi Sŏnggye win popular support for the new dynasty as heaven's will.

When Cho petitioned Jungjong to revoke special privileges of people who falsely contributed to 1506 coup, Jungjong's suspicion was further heightened. Now feeling certain that Jungjong was sufficiently estranged from Cho, Hong Kyŏngju secretly entered the palace to warn King Jungjong that the court was filled with Cho's supporters and that no one could dare oppose him openly. Jungjong dispatched a secret letter to Hong Kyŏngju, expressing his fear that Cho would next go after Hungu officials who did contribute to the coup by questioning legitimacy of the coup and then turn against the king himself. Jungjong instructed Hungu leaders to kill Cho and then inform him. On November 15, 1519, Hungu leaders entered the palace secretly at night to bypass Royal Secretariat and present to the king written charges against Cho: he and his supporters "deceived the king and put the state in disorder by forming a clique and abusing their positions to promote their supporters while excluding their opponents, and thereby misleading young people to make extremism into habit, causing the young to despise the old, the low-born to disrespect the high-born." Inspector General Cho, Justice Minister Kim Jung, and six others were immediately arrested, and they were about to be killed extra-judicially without trial or even investigation. The whole event had appearance of coup d'état except that it was sanctioned by the king.

=== "What is their crime?" ===
They would have been immediately killed except that minister of war Yi Changgon (이장곤; 李長坤), who arrested Sarim officials, entreated that ministers should be consulted for such decision. The cabinet meeting on the following day regarding Cho's fate is described in detail in the Veritable Records of the Joseon Dynasty. Most officials expressed their shock at Cho's arrest and Jungjong's intention to kill him. They entreated that he may have been extreme in his youthful zeal to improve the country but could not possibly have private agenda. Chief State Councillor Chŏng Kwangp'il said in tears: "I have frequently witnessed horrid calamities during the reign of deposed king (Yeonsangun), but how could I imagine seeing such thing again even after meeting the wise king?" When Jungjong tried to leave, he even grasped the royal cloth to entreat further. He "could not understand on what charges the king wanted to punish them" for "mere demotion of 2-3 ranks would be already excessive." Eighteen younger officials requested to the king to imprison them with Cho. State Council and Six Ministries jointly entreated that punishing Cho and others on such charges without evidence would become a blot on the king's reputation. Even Hong Suk, who became Justice Minister overnight and interrogated Cho, reported to the king that he was "deeply moved" by Cho's loyalty.

New Inspector General Yu Un (유운; 柳雲), who replaced Cho, protested in even stronger terms: "If Cho is guilty of crime, he should be punished in an open and just manner... Instead, Your Majesty is handing out such punishment according to secret words by two people in the middle of night... What is so difficult about punishing few seonbis with authority of king that Your Majesty should do so covertly by sending a secret message?... If there is a crime, it should be dealt with clearly and justly, but Your Majesty appeared to trust and be friendly with them on the outside while thinking of eliminating them in mind." He was finally dismissed after asking Jungjong to "cut my head to please the wicked people." Meanwhile, 150 Sungkyunkwan students stormed the palace to protest Cho's arrest and filled the palace with shouts of entreaties, and later 240 students petitioned to claim Cho's innocence and requested to be imprisoned together. There was such popular outpouring for Cho's release that it may have increased Jungjong's suspicion and anger.

=== Third Literati Purge of 1519 ===
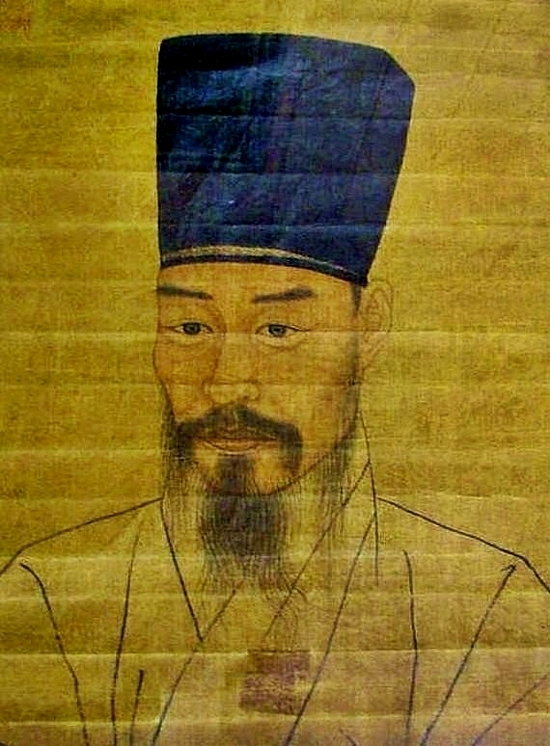
Portrait of Cho

Cho was completely caught off guard with this turn of events. The Sarim faction had scored its biggest victory just four days ago when Jungjong granted their petition to revoke special status for 70 Hungu officials. He continued to believe that Jungjong was misled by his enemies and was confident that he could persuade the king of his loyalty once he could face him in the interrogation. He wrote to Jungjong of his fear for this incident becoming a bloody purge and entreated that he would not regret dying ten thousand times if only he could be granted an audience. However, he would never have a chance to see Jungjong again. Amid petitions for leniency, Jungjong commuted the death sentence to exile, and Cho was exiled to Neung-ju.

Nevertheless, Jungjong was determined to put Cho to death. In the Annals, there was no official demand for Cho's death, not even by Hong Kyŏngju, Nam Kon, and Sim Chŏng, except for a petition by three Seunggyungwan students (as opposed to 300 who petitioned for his release). Nam Kon rather urged against executing Cho multiple times even as he was adding more and more names to the list of people to be purged through exile or dismissal. Yet Jungjong turned against Cho with the same intensity as when he favored him. He reinstated death sentence by poison for Cho less than a month after their exile. He fired many ministers who entreated on Cho's behalf including Chief State Councillor Chŏng Kwangp'il, Deputy State Councillor An Tang, and even War Minister Yi Changgon, who took part in arresting Sarim officials.

Cho still could not believe Jungjong's heart really turned against him and hoped to be recalled by the king, keeping a north door open each day during exile. Even when soldiers arrived with poison, he was suspicious that Hungu leaders might be trying to kill him without Jungjong's approval. But when he learned that Nam Kon and Sim Chŏng became Vice State Councillor and Minister of Personnel, he realized that Jungjong's change of heart was final.

Before drinking the poison, Cho wrote a poem declaring his loyalty, asked his people not to make his coffin too heavy, and apologized to the owner and servant of the house for not paying his debt and instead showing them a terrible sight and desecrating their house. He then bowed four times toward the north in the direction of palace. (It was customary to pay respect to the king in gratitude for granting poison, which was not an official method of execution and was considered more honorable form of death, instead of beheading or hanging.) When he drank poison, he did not die immediately, and the soldiers tried to strangle him. Cho rebuked them saying that the king intended to spare his neck by sending the poison and requested for another bowl of poison. He died at the age of 37. Later when there was a severe drought in the country, the populace blamed that it was heaven's punishment for killing an innocent seonbi. Many of remaining Sarim scholars left the central government in protest and retreated to rural provinces. Most of Cho's reforms were revoked with his fall.

The Third Literati Purge of 1519 (기묘사화 己卯士禍) was widely viewed as a missed opportunity to reform Joseon Dynasty by later generations because Joseon politics soon degenerated into power struggle among in-laws and relatives of the royal family. A year after the purge, a histographer wrote that bribery and corruption became widespread in the court and local administrations. Later, purge victims were venerated as "Wise Men of Gimyo" (Gimyo is the Korean calendar name for year 1519) while three main instigators (Hong Kyŏngju, Nam Kon, and Sim Chŏng) were collectively called "Evil Three of Gimyo".

Hong Kyŏngju died two years later of natural causes, but Sim Chŏng and Consort Gyeong of the Miryang Pak clan were later executed on a framed charge of cursing the crown prince in a plot concocted by their rival Kim Allo (Queen Inmok’s relative). Kim Allo was killed by rival Yun Wŏnhyŏng (Queen Munjeong's brother), who in turn was purged by King Myeongjong. Sim, Kim, and Yun are all considered some of the most corrupt officials in Joseon dynasty. Nam Kon, who was reportedly deeply saddened at Cho's death, regretted his role in the purge and willed that all his writings be burnt, saying that he "deceived the world with vain name," so no remains of his writing except for one short poem exist although he was one of the most famous writers of his time. Nam Kon, initially of Sarim faction as a disciple of Kim Chong-jik, was a moderate supporter of reforms and supposedly sought Cho's friendship but was rebuffed by Cho and his supporters as a petty Hungu official.

Ten years after the purge, King Jungjong again began to advance Sarim scholars by recalling them from exile and reappointing them to the royal court. Nevertheless, Jungjong did not rehabilitate Cho's name to the end despite endless petitions, saying at one time that what happened in 1519 was "neither right nor wrong." There is speculation as to what Jungjong really believed about the leaf incident since Jungjong never accused Cho of disloyalty or anything, but pure intentions after first few days of Cho's arrest. From very early on, Jungjong's official position has been that Cho intended well but caused a situation that could only be rectified with a purge. Cho was finally rehabilitated by his son, Injong of Joseon, and was posthumously honored as a chief state councilor by Seonjo of Joseon in 1568.

=== Legacy ===
Cho was greatly venerated by later generations of Korean neo-Confucianists as their spiritual head but was also criticized for mistakes that led to the failure of his reforms. Yi Hwang and Yi Yi (son of Shin Saimdang), often considered Joseon's two greatest Confucian philosophers, lamented that he entered politics too early before his scholarship was completed and pursued his reforms too rapidly. Nevertheless, Yi Hwang praised him as one of "Four Worthies" along with Kim Koengp'il, Chŏng Yŏch'ang, and Yi Ŏnjŏk. He also said that Cho showed the direction for all seonbis to aim and follow and unveiled the foundation of governing a country. Cho's emphasis on neo-Confucian ethics as practical philosophy has been very influential as the previous focus has been on more literary aspects of Confucianism. It was also during his time that Confucianism finally took roots deeply among the common populace. Even though Confucianism was the official state religion since the founding of Joseon, Confucian practices were largely limited to aristocratic class. His dream of making neo-Confucianism the predominant philosophy of Joseon was soon accomplished by the reign of Seonjo, fifty years after his death. He was canonized and enshrined in the Sungkyunkwan in 1610, one of only eighteen Korean Confucian scholars so honored by the Joseon Dynasty. However, the Sarim faction that venerated Cho's name did not attempt to carry out his reforms when they seized political power during Seonjo's reign and they maintained power until the end of Joseon dynasty. Some people blame Cho for dogmatism of Korean Neo-Confucianism, which became very conservative and caused Korea to resist changes and new learnings from abroad.

Today his name remains a byword for reform in Korea, and his example is often raised when there is a controversy about a reform.

== Family ==
- Father - Cho Wŏngang (조원강; 趙元綱; 1454–1500)
- Mother - Lady Min of the Yeoheung Min clan (여흥 민씨; 驪興 閔氏; 1458–1560)
- Sibling(s)
  - Older brother - Cho Yŏngjo (조영조; 趙榮祖; 1476–?)
  - Younger brother - Cho Sungjo (조숭조; 趙崇祖; 1486–1559)
- Wife
  - Lady Yi of the Hansan Yi clan (한산 이씨; 韓山 李氏; 1482–1557)
- Children
  - Son - Cho Chŏng (조정; 趙定; 1515–?)
  - Son - Cho Yong (조용; 趙容; 1518–?)

== In popular culture ==
- Cho was the protagonist of 1996 KBS TV series Jo and was a prominent character in 2001 SBS TV series Ladies of the Palace.
- In MBC TV series Dae Jang Geum (2003-4), he does not appear as a character, but his name is mentioned frequently (often as Jo Jung-ahm) as the political foe of fictitious villain Right Minister Oh. Main protagonist Jang-geum and Lady Han are falsely accused of being in conspiracy with Jo while male protagonist Min Jung-ho is portrayed as his supporter (Min Jung-ho found a doctor for him and is shown recruiting his followers to return to politics). In the musical version of Dae Jang Geum, Cho is a prominent character as a friend of Min Jung-ho.
- In KBS TV series Immortal Admiral Yi Sun-sin (2004-5), Yi Sun-sin's grandfather is described to have been executed for supporting Cho and Yi's father is arrested while holding a memorial rite at Cho's abandoned house.
- In 2006 KBS series Hwang Jini, the male protagonist Kim Jeong-han is portrayed as Cho's disciple while another character Lee Saeng become Hwang Jini's bodyguard after he leaves his father's home in disgust because his father is Cho Kwangjo's friend but betrays him to become prime minister.

== See also ==
- List of Korean philosophers
- Neo-Confucianism
- Nam Kon
- Kim Chong-jik

== Sources ==
- Kalton, Michael (1988). To Become a Sage. Translation from Ten Diagrams on Sage Learning by Yi T'oegye (1501–1570). Columbia University Press. ISBN 0-231-06410-1.
