= Yonan Lee clan =

Korean clan from Hwanghae Province

Yohan Lee clan
- Country: Korea
- Current region: Yonan, Hwanghae Province
- Founder: Yi Mu
- Connected members: Lee Yeon-hee; Lee Chung-ah; Lee Deok-hwa
- Website: realmani.com

The Yonan Lee clan (Korean: 연안 이씨; Hanja: 延安 李氏) is a Korean clan. Their bon-gwan is in Yonan County, Hwanghae Province, now in North Korea. According to the census held in 2015, the number of Yonan Lee clan’s member was 164,036. Their founder was Yi Mu. It is did that around 660, he became a general during the Tang dynasty who came to Silla and eventually went to bring down Baekje. Yi Mu founded the Yonan Lee clan after he was naturalized in Silla.

== See also ==
- Korean clan names of foreign origin
