= Nam Kon =

Korean politician (1471–1527)

Nam Kon 남곤

Chief State Councillor
- In office May 3, 1523 – April 10, 1527
- Preceded by: Kim Chŏn
- Succeeded by: Chŏng Kwangp'il

Left State Councillor
- In office January 7, 1520 – May 3, 1523
- Preceded by: An Tang
- Succeeded by: Yi Yuch'ŏng

Personal details
- Born: 1471
- Died: March 10, 1527 (aged 55–56)

Korean name
- Hangul: 남곤
- Hanja: 南袞
- RR: Nam Gon
- MR: Nam Kon

Art name
- Hangul: 지정, 지족당, 지족
- Hanja: 止亭, 知足堂, 知足
- RR: Jijeong, Jijokdang, Jijok
- MR: Chijŏng, Chijoktang, Chijok

Courtesy name
- Hangul: 사화
- Hanja: 士華
- RR: Sahwa
- MR: Sahwa

Posthumous name
- Hangul: 문경
- Hanja: 文敬
- RR: Mungyeong
- MR: Mun'gyŏng

Nam Kon (Korean: 남곤; Hanja: 南袞; 1471 – 10 March 1527) was a Korean politician, poet, Neo-Confucian scholar, thinker, writer and Prime Minister during the Joseon period. His art names were Chijŏng (지정; 止亭), Chijoktang (지족당; 知足堂) and Chijok (지족; 知足), while his courtesy name was Sahwa (사화; 士華). He was also a member of the Sarim faction.

== Biography ==
Nam was a Korean Neo-Confucian scholar of the Yŏngnam school and student of Kim Chong-jik. He was the Joseon Dynasty's Left State Councillor until 1520, and then Chief State Councillor from 1523 to 1527. Nam Kon studied under Neo-Confucian scholar Kim Chong-jik. He was an ideological and political rival of Cho Kwangjo. Cho studied under his friend Kim Koengp'il.

== Works ==
- Chijŏng chip (지정집; 止亭集)
- Yu Chagwang chŏn (유자광전; 柳子光傳)
- Namakch'angsurok (남악창수록; 南岳唱酬錄)

== Family ==
Parents

- Father: Nam Ch'isin (남치신; 1420–?)
- Mother: Lady Ha of the Jinju Ha clan (증 정경부인 진주 하씨)

Sibling(s)

- Older brother: Nam P'o (남포; 南褒; 1459–?)

Wives and their children

- Lady Yi of the Yonan Yi clan (정경부인 연안 이씨); daughter of Yi Seung (숙천부사 이세웅; 李世雄)
  - 1st daughter: Lady Nam of the Uiryeong Nam clan (의령 남씨)
  - 2nd daughter: Lady Nam of the Uiryeong Nam clan (의령 남씨; 1492–?)
  - 3rd daughter: Lady Nam of the Uiryeong Nam clan (의령 남씨)
- Unnamed concubine
  - 4th daughter: Lady Nam of the Uiryeong Nam clan (의령 남씨)
  - 1st son: Nam Sŭngsa (남승사; 南承嗣)
- Concubine: Lady Choun (조운) – a kisaeng

== See also ==
- List of Korean philosophers
- Neo-Confucianism
- Kim Chong-jik
- Cho Kwangjo
