= Hungu (Korean political faction) =

Hungu (Korean: 훈구파; Hanja: 勳舊派; RR: hungupa) was a political faction of the Joseon Dynasty in the 15th and 16th centuries. It formed in 1455 under Sejo of Joseon. After the death of Sejo and ascension of Seongjong of Joseon, the rival faction Sarim gained power and influence. The Hungu retaliated under the reign of Yeonsangun in two violent purges of Sarim members. After Yeonsangun's overthrow by pro-Sarim Jungjong and his minister Cho Kwangjo, Hungu engineered a third purge that resulted in Cho's death. Hungu wielded power through the rest of Jungjong's reign and into the reign of Myeongjong of Joseon. In 1567, with the ascension of Seonjo of Joseon to the throne, the influence of Hungu permanently ended in favor of Sarim.

== Members ==
Members include:

- Sin Sukchu
- Chŏng Inji
- Jeong Chang-son
- Sŏng Hŭian
- Pak Wŏnjong

== Events ==
- Yeonsangun of Joseon: First Literati Purge of 1498 (Muo Sahwa (무오사화) and Second Literati Purge of 1504 Gapja Sahwa (갑자사화)
- Jungjong of Joseon: coup of 1506, Third Literati Purge of 1519 Gimyo Sahwa (기묘사화)

== See also ==
- Edward Willett Wagner (1 July 1974), The Literati Purges, doi:10.2307/J.CTT1TFJCWP, JSTOR 10.2307/j.ctt1tfjcwp, Wikidata Q123458027
