= Hyangyak =

Type of local government in Korea and Vietnam

The hyangyak (Korean: 향약; Vietnamese: Hương ước (鄉約)) was a contractual arrangement that allowed for a degree of local government in the history of Korea and Vietnam.

== In Korea ==
- Hyangyak
- Hangul: 향약
- Hanja: 鄕約
- RR: hyangyak
- MR: hyangyak

During the rule of Jungjong (1506–1544), the contract was enforced by local-level officials. Specific details were circulated in text and operated as an informal common law. The hyangyak became the core of Korea's social law and the vehicle of a degree of local autonomy for its villages.

It was a stepping stone for the Joseon Dynasty for implementing government at the local level. Local yangban, or Korean scholar-officials, were lifted in importance because of the role that they played. The implementation of the hyangyak opened the way for schools and shrines and tied the yangban to the community as instrumental in strengthening the government at all levels.

== In Vietnam ==
- Rural convention
- Vietnamese alphabet: Hương ước / Hương lệ / Lệ làng
- Hán-Nôm: 鄉約 / 鄉例 / 例廊

Throughout Vietnam, thousands of villages had their own independent legal codes known as the Hương ước (鄉約) that governed social relations within the community. Thousands of written regulations existed, and the central administration often recognised them. The origins of these village conventions is unknown. According to jurist Lê Đức Tiết, they may date back as far as the Trưng sisters period but were unwritten until the Trần dynasty period. The scholar of Oriental studies Nguyễn Văn Vịnh divides these conventions into two categories: "pre-written conventions" (tiền hương ước) and "officially written conventions" (hương ước thành văn chính thức).

The Hương ước contained rules about various legal practices like land management, marriage, labour relations, arbitration of disputes, as well as local customs such as family relations, village relations, ghosts, ancestor worship, sacrifice, and mourning.

During the colonial period, both the government-general of French Indochina and the government of the Nguyễn dynasty attempted to reform these rules and regulations in their favour. To expand their power into Vietnamese hamlets and villages, the French administration issued models for the villages to follow, but many continued to function independently of the French and Nguyễn administrations. The French reformed Vietnamese marriage and funeral laws in order to weaken the influence of the Hương ước.

In 1954, the Hương ước system was abolished in North Vietnam as part of its land reforms. The system was seen as "a remnant of a backward feudal system" by the North Vietnamese government and was replaced with a socialist cooperative production model and a new social structure based on the system of the Soviet Union.

During the 1980s in the Socialist Republic of Vietnam, during the Đổi Mới reforms, the Hương ước were re-recognised and re-evaluated in an attempt to restore village customs. Today, the Hương ước is no longer as culturally relevant as it was before, remaining heavily procedural under the supervision of district-level People's Committees.

== Sources ==
- Key P. Yang; Gregory Henderson: An Outline History of Korean Confucianism: Part II: The Schools of Yi Confucianism. In: The Journal of Asian Studies, Vol. 18, No. 2. (Feb. 1959), pp. 259–276. Retrieved on 3 August 2005 "Stable URL"
