= Queen Inmok =

Queen of Joseon from 1602 to 1608

Grand Queen Dowager of Joseon
- Tenure: 30 September 1624 – 13 August 1632
- Predecessor: Grand Queen Dowager Seongryeol
- Successor: Grand Queen Dowager Jaui

Queen Dowager of Joseon
- First tenure: 16 March 1608 – 24 February 1618
- Predecessor: Queen Dowager Gongui; Queen Dowager Uiseong
- Successor: Herself
- Second tenure: 13 April 1623 – 30 September 1624
- Predecessor: Herself
- Successor: Queen Dowager Jaui

Queen Consort of Joseon
- Tenure: 29 August 1602 – 16 March 1608
- Predecessor: Queen Uiin
- Successor: Queen Yu
- Born: 15 December 1584; Bansong-bang, Hanseong, Joseon
- Died: 13 August 1632 (aged 47); Heummyeongjeon, Ingyeonggung, Hanseong, Joseon
- Burial: Mongneung, Donggureung Cluster, Guri, South Korea
- Spouse: King Seonjo (m. 1602; died 1608)
- Issue Detail: 1 son, 2 daughters
Regnal name
- Soseong Jeongui Myeongryeol (소성정의명렬; 昭聖貞懿明烈) (Note: Known as honorific name (존호; 尊號) in the Sinosphere, its closest equivalent in the English-speaking world is the regnal name.)
Posthumous name
- Queen Gwangsuk Jangjeong Jeongsuk Inmok (광숙장정정숙인목왕후; 光淑莊定正肅仁穆王后)
- Clan: Yonan Kim (by birth); Jeonju Yi (by marriage)
- Dynasty: Yi
- Father: Kim Je-nam, Internal Prince Yeonheung
- Mother: Internal Princess Consort Gwangsan, of the Gwangju No clan

Korean name
- Hangul: 인목왕후
- Hanja: 仁穆王后
- RR: Inmok wanghu
- MR: Inmok wanghu

Queen Inmok (Korean: 인목왕후; Hanja: 仁穆王后; 15 December 1584 – 13 August 1632), of the Yonan Kim clan, was the second wife of King Seonjo, the 14th monarch of Joseon, and the mother of Grand Prince Yeongchang. She was queen of Joseon from 1602 until her husband's death in 1608, and was then styled as Queen Dowager Soseong during the reign of her stepson, Gwanghaegun, and as Grand Queen Dowager Soseong during the reign of her stepgrandson, King Injo.

For centuries, mainstream history — heavily influenced by Confucian ideology and the victors of the Injo Restoration (인조반정) — painted Queen Inmok as the ultimate tragic maternal figure. Modern historians offer a more nuanced and critical perspective. The consensus has shifted from seeing her as a blameless victim to viewing her as a short-sighted, and to some extent, self-serving person, whose lack of political insight and social awareness, as well as inability to control her ambitious faction, helped trigger the tragedy that defined her life. Moreover, her prioritization of personal vendettas to the detriment of state welfare left an indelible mark on Korean history.

== Biography ==
=== Early life and lineage ===
The future Queen Inmok was born during the reign of King Seonjo, as the third child and younger daughter among three sons and two daughters. Her father was Kim Je-nam (김제남) and her mother was a lady from the Gwangju No clan.

On her paternal side, she was a first cousin three times removed of Kim An-ro, as well as a 5th great-granddaughter of King Sejong and Queen Soheon via their second daughter, Princess Jeongui (정의공주), and a 7th great-granddaughter of King Taejong and Queen Wongyeong via their second daughter, Princess Gyeongjeong (경정공주).

=== As queen ===
Following the death of Queen Uiin, Lady Kim became King Seonjo's second wife in 1602. She was four months away from her 18th birthday, whereas Seonjo was older than both of her parents, being her senior by 32 years. He also had at least 19 living children at the time, of whom six were older than Lady Kim, and had already installed his second concubine-born son, Yi Hon (later known as Gwanghaegun/Prince Gwanghae), as crown prince. The union garnered harsh criticism and would remain the royal marriage with the largest age gap until the 64-year-old King Yeongjo married 13-year-old Queen Jeongsun in 1759. However, unlike the aforementioned case, Seonjo had the option of elevating one of his many consorts to the position of queen, but insisted on holding a selection, presumably due to his fixation on having an heir with unquestionable legitimacy.

At almost 18 years old, Lady Kim was considered unusually old, as the age range for the selection of a queen was typically between 12 and 15. The prevailing speculation was that she had missed her chance to marry due to the Imjin War, but it was most likely her father's lack of social skills, which caused him to be an outcast in noble circles, that made it difficult for Lady Kim to find a match. However, her advanced age probably became an advantage in the selection, because it meant she could conceive immediately. She became pregnant shortly after the wedding and gave birth to Princess Jeongmyeong in 1603. A second pregnancy resulted in a stillborn daughter in 1604, and the much-awaited legitimate son was born in 1606; he was named Yi Ui, later enfeoffed as Grand Prince Yeongchang.

In contrast to the highborn and dignified Queen Uiin, the compliant Lady Kim, who was fundamentally a noblewoman but in reality came from a declining family and had received little formal education, suited Seonjo better. Conversely, Lady Kim innately lacked the sound judgement of the favored Concubine In and quickly antagonized Gwanghaegun through thoughtless actions — such as asking whether she should address her son as crown prince or grand prince — and failure to control her palace ladies, who often acted insolently in front of Gwanghaegun and persecuted the servants in his quarters.

=== Widowhood and downfall ===
After King Seonjo's death in 1608, Gwanghaegun acceded to the throne and Lady Kim became queen dowager, receiving the honorific name Soseong (소성; lit. ''illustrious and sacred''). Perhaps aware that it was impossible to replaced Gwanghaegun with her barely 2-year-old infant son, she promptly acknowledged Gwanghaegun's succession. Nevertheless, their relationship remained strained.

During this period, the ruling Greater Northerners eliminated figures threatening royal authority by staging large-scale purges. In 1613, Kim Je-nam was implicated in the Gyechuk Purge (계축옥사) alongside two of his sons, Kim Nae (김내) and Kim Gyu (김규), and his son-in-law, Shim Jeong-se (심정세), and they were executed on the charge of attempting to enthrone Grand Prince Yeongchang. His youngest son, Kim Seon (김선), was also detained, but his execution was postponed until early 1614 due to his young age. Lady Kim's mother was placed under house arrest and later imprisoned on Jeju Island, while the great wealth the family had accumulated in recent years was confiscated. Meanwhile, Grand Prince Yeongchang was stripped of his royal status and exiled to Ganghwa Island, where he was ultimately sentenced to death.

Lady Kim and Princess Jeongmyeong were confined to the deserted Gyeongungung, and all communication with the outside world was cut off. At this time, the proposal to depose Lady Kim emerged as a major point of political contention, sparking intense debate between opposing factions. Gwanghaegun eventually proclaimed an edict that redesignated his stepmother as the "Lady of the Western Palace" (서궁) and mandated that she be treated according to the protocols reserved for a royal consort.

=== Later life ===
In 1623, as Prince Neungyang launched a coup d'état with the support of the staunchly conservative Westerners, Lady Kim issued an edict ordering Gwanghaegun's dethronement and the establishment of her stepgrandson, Prince Neungyang (posthumously King Injo), as the new monarch. She then unsuccessfully attempted to have Gwanghaegun executed.

Following the coup, Lady Kim and her daughter were granted permission to live within Changdeokgung and their titles were reinstated; Lady Kim was further elevated to the position of grand queen dowager in 1624. Princess Jeongmyeong was also belatedly arranged to marry Hong Ju-won, and they became ancestors of Lady Hyegyeong.

=== Death ===
Lady Kim died at the age of 47, having survived her husband by 24 years. She was buried alongside King Seonjo and Queen Uiin within Mongneung (목릉), today part of the Donggureung Cluster in Guri, Gyeonggi Province.

Prior to her death, she had given a note to her family in which she disallowed future marital alliances with the royal family as she had personally experience the heavy burden of such a marriage. In due course, this note passed down to her younger brother's descendant, Kim Su-deok, who would wed Prince Ui and endure an unhappy marriage more than 250 years later.

=== Gyechuk Ilgi ===
Gyechuk Ilgi (계축일기; lit. ''Diary of the Gyechuk Year'') is a court essay written by a palace lady. Though its essay format accords it the appearance of objectivity, it centers on Lady Kim's confinement and the death of Grand Prince Yeongchang, making no mention of Gwanghaegun's achievements such as neutral diplomacy. Historians have concluded that the picture of Gwanghaegun presented in the Gyechuk Ilgi deviates markedly from the accounts in contemporary historical records, and suggest several reasons for the severely skewed interpretation: firstly, it was composed after Gwanghaegun was overthrown; secondly, the author presumably served Lady Kim; and thirdly, the work follows the pattern of extreme opposition between good and evil already entrenched in traditional fiction of the Joseon period, distorting, simplifing and exaggerating more complex situations.

== Titles ==
- During the reign of King Seonjo (r. 1567–1608):
  - Lady, of the Yonan Kim clan (연안 김씨; 延安金氏; from 15 December 1584)
    - Kim Je-nam's daughter (김제남의 딸)
    - Lady Kim (김씨; 金氏)
  - Queen (왕비; 王妃; from 29 August 1602)
- During the reign of Gwanghaegun (r. 1608–1623):
  - Queen Dowager Soseong (소성왕대비; 昭聖王大妃; from 16 March 1608)
  - Lady of the Western Palace (서궁; 西宮; from 24 February 1618)
- During the reign of King Injo (r. 1623–1649):
  - Queen Dowager Soseong (소성왕대비; 昭聖王大妃; from 13 April 1623)
  - Grand Queen Dowager Soseong (소성대왕대비; 昭聖大王大妃; from 30 September 1624)
  - Queen Inmok (인목왕후; 仁穆王后; from 1632)

== Family ==
- Father: Kim Je-nam (김제남), Internal Prince Yeonheung (연흥부원군; 1562 – 18 July 1613)
- Mother: Internal Princess Consort Gwangsan (광산부부인), of the Gwangju No clan (광주 노씨; 1557–1637)
- Sibling(s)
  - Kim Nae (김내; 1576–1613) (Note: ▪︎Wife: Lady, of the Chogye Jeong clan (초계 정씨; 1575—1640); daughter of Jeong Muk (정묵). ▪︎Issue: 2 sons, 3 daughters.)
  - Lady, of the Yonan Kim clan (연안 김씨; 1581–1604) (Note: Married Shim Jeong-se (심정세; 1579–1613) from the Cheongsong Shim clan (청송 심씨); grandson of Shim Ui-gyeom, grandnephew of Queen Insun and maternal nephew of Queen Inheon. They had issue (1 son, 1 daughter).)
  - Kim Gyu (김규; 1596–1613) (Note: ▪︎Wife: Lady, of the Daegu Seo clan (대구 서씨; 1597–1666), given name Mi-saeng (미생); daughter of Princess Jeongsin. ▪︎Issue: 1 son; among his descendants is Princess Consort Ui.)
  - Kim Seon (김선; 1599–1614)
- Husband: King Seonjo (선조대왕; 6 December 1552 – 16 March 1608)
  - Biological father-in-law: Grand Internal Prince Deokheung (덕흥대원군; 2 April 1530 – 14 June 1559)
  - Adoptive father-in-law: King Myeongjong (명종대왕; 13 July 1534 – 12 August 1567)
  - Biological mother-in-law: Grand Internal Princess Consort Hadong (하동부대부인), of the Hadong Jeong clan (하동 정씨; 24 September 1530 – 24 June 1567)
  - Adoptive mother-in-law: Queen Insun (인순왕후), of the Cheongsong Shim clan (청송 심씨; 7 July 1532 – 22 February 1575)
- Issue
  - Princess Jeongmyeong (정명공주; 27 June 1603 – 8 September 1685)
  - Unnamed daughter (1604)
  - Yi Ui (이의), Grand Prince Yeongchang (영창대군; 12 April 1606 – 19 March 1614)

== Ancestry ==
Ancestors of Queen Inmok

Kim Jeon (김전)
Kim An-do (김안도)
Lady, of the Jincheon Song clan (진천 송씨)
Kim O (김오)
Seong Se-tong (성세통)
Lady, of the Changnyeong Seong clan (창녕 성씨)
Kim Je-nam, Internal Prince Yeonheung (연흥부원군 김제남)
Gwon Sang (권상)
Lady, of the Andong Gwon clan (안동 권씨)
Ryu Bok-ryong (류복룡)
Lady, of the Munhwa Ryu clan (문화 류씨)
Queen Inmok
No Ja-jang (노자장)
No Han-mun (노한문)
No Gye (노계)
Internal Princess Gwangsan, of the Gwangju No clan (광산부부인 광주 노씨)
Han Yong (한용)
Lady, of the Cheongju Han clan (청주 한씨)

== In popular culture ==
- Portrayed by Jo Mi-ryeong in the 1962 film Queen Dowager Inmok.
- Portrayed by Yoon Jeong-hee in the 1974–1975 TBC TV series 500 Years of Women of the Yi dynasty: Queen Inmok.
- Portrayed by Kwon Jae-hee in the 1986 MBC TV series 500 Years of Joseon: The Hoechun Gate.
- Portrayed by Lee Bo-hee in the 1995 KBS2 TV series West Palace.
- Portrayed by Hong Eun-hee in the 1999–2000 MBC TV series Hur Jun.
- Portrayed by Lee Hyun-kyung in the 2000–2001 KBS2 TV series Roll of Thunder.
- Portrayed by Hong Soo-hyun in the 2003–2004 SBS TV series The King's Woman.
- Portrayed by Choi Soo-ji in the 2008 KBS2 TV series Hong Gil-dong.
- Portrayed by Seo Yi-an in the 2013 MBC TV series Hur Jun, The Original Story.
- Portrayed by Go Won-hee in the 2014–2015 KBS2 TV series The King's Face.
- Portrayed by Shin Eun-jung in the 2015 MBC TV series Splendid Politics.
- Inspired a fictional queen dowager portrayed by Jang Young-nam in the 2019 tvN TV series The Crowned Clown.
- Portrayed by Oh Ha-nee in the 2019 KBS2 TV series The Tale of Nokdu.
- Portrayed by Yoon Young-min in the 2021 MBN TV series Bossam: Steal the Fate.

== See also ==
- History of Korea
- Styles and titles in Joseon
- Political factions of Joseon

== Notes ==
Queen Inmok Yonan Kim clan
Royal titles
| Preceded by Queen Uiin of the Bannam Park clan | Queen Consort of Joseon; 1602–1608 | Succeeded by Queen Yu of the Munhwa Yu clan |
| Preceded by Queen Dowager Gongui of the Bannam Park clan −−−−−−− Queen Dowager Uiseong of the Cheongsong Shim clan | Queen Dowager of Joseon; 1608–1618; 1623–1624 | Succeeded by Queen Dowager Jaui of the Yangju Jo clan |
| Preceded by Grand Queen Dowager Seongryeol of the Papyeong Yun clan | Grand Queen Dowager of Joseon; 1624–1632 | Succeeded by Grand Queen Dowager Jaui of the Yangju Jo clan |
