= Kim Kaesi =

Korean royal consort (1584–1623)

- Court Lady of the Senior Fifth Rank
- Born: 1584; Joseon
- Died: 14 April 1623 (aged 38–39); Hanseong, Joseon
- Consort of: King Seonjo; Gwanghaegun
- Father: Lord Kim
- Mother: Lady Kang

Korean name
- Hangul: 김개시
- Hanja: 金介屎
- RR: Gim Gaesi
- MR: Kim Kaesi

Court Lady Kim (Korean: 상궁 김씨; Hanja: 尙宮 金氏; 1584 – 14 April 1623), personal name Kim Kaesi, was a palace woman during the Joseon period who became a concubine of King Seonjo and later of his son, Gwanghaegun. During the latter's reign, she intervened in state affairs and wielded immense power, being remembered today as one of the most infamous women in Korean history. She was executed by beheading shortly after Gwanghaegun's dethronement.

== Biography ==
=== Life in the palace ===
There aren't any extant records about Lady Kim's family or early life. It is only known that she was originally a maid in Gwanghaegun's quarters, and owing to her literacy and skill in handling documents, she was later moved into the service of Gwanghaegun's father, King Seonjo, eventually receiving his favor (승은; seungeun) and becoming his favorite concubine. While not beautiful, she was liked by both Seonjo and Gwanghae due to her quick-wit and cleverness. She was not only skilled in dancing and singing, but also possessed excellent judgment and was adept at political strategizing.

Lady Kim joined hands with the Greater Northerners, a faction that supported Gwanghaegun, and worked to secure his accession to the throne. After Seonjo's death in 1608, she returned to serve Gwanghaegun, and despite her lowly background and lack of proper status — as she remained a court lady instead of being promoted to an official royal consort — she came to wield such power as to surpass Queen Yu, Gwanghaegun's legitimate wife and the leader of the internal court, and even rival Yi I-cheom (이이첨). Although there was criticism for keeping the former king's favored court lady close, Gwanghaegun trusted Lady Kim and Lady Kim also proved her loyalty. She played a major role in the ousting of the Lesser Northerners, the elimination of Grand Prince Yeongchang and the confinement of Queen Inmok.

=== Downfall and death ===
After the Westerners successfully launched a coup d'état that replaced Gwanghaegun with his nephew, Prince Neungyang (posthumously King Injo), Lady Kim was branded a wicked woman (악녀; or femme fatale) and sentenced to beheading.

== In popular culture ==
- Portrayed by Lee Min-ja in the 1962 film Queen Dowager Inmok.
- Portrayed by Kim Bo-yeon in the 1982 MBC TV series The Women of Legend: Queen of West Palace.
- Portrayed by Won Mi-kyung in the 1985–1986 MBC TV series 500 Years of Joseon: The Imjin War.
- Portrayed by Won Mi-kyung in the 1986 MBC TV series 500 Years of Joseon: The Hoechun Gate.
- Portrayed by Lee Young-ae in the 1995 KBS2 TV series West Palace.
- Portrayed by Lee Joo-hwa in the 2000–2001 KBS2 TV series Roll of Thunder.
- Portrayed by Park Sun-young in the 2003–2004 SBS TV series The King's Woman.
- Portrayed by Choi Hwa-jung in the 2004–2005 KBS1 TV series Immortal Admiral Yi Sun-sin.
- Inspired a fictional court lady portrayed by Lee El in the 2012 film Masquerade.
- Portrayed by Jeon Min-seo and Jo Yoon-hee in the 2014–2015 KBS2 TV series The King's Face.
- Portrayed by Shin Rin-ah, Jo Jung-eun and Kim Yeo-jin in the 2015 MBC TV series Splendid Politics.
- Inspired a fictional court lady portrayed by Min Ji-ah in the 2019 tvN TV series The Crowned Clown.
- Portrayed by Song Seon-mi in the 2021 MBN TV series Bossam: Steal the Fate.

== See also ==
- Political factions of Joseon
- Naemyeongbu
- Styles and titles in Joseon
- Other notorious women of the Joseon period:
  - Ŏudong
  - Deposed Queen Yun
  - Chang Noksu
  - Queen Munjeong
  - Jeong Nan-jeong
  - Gwiin Jo
  - Huibin Jang
