= Gwanghaegun of Joseon =

King of Joseon from 1608 to 1623

Gwanghaegun

King of Joseon
- Reign: 16 March 1608 – 13 April 1623
- Enthronement: 17 March 1608; West Hall, Haenggung (Note: Korean: 행궁; Hanja: 行宮 (lit. ''Temporary Palace''), also known as "Jeongneung-dong Haenggung" (정릉동 행궁; 貞陵洞 行宮).)
- Predecessor: Seonjo
- Successor: Injo

Crown Prince of Joseon
- Tenure: 8 June 1592 – 16 March 1608
- Predecessor: Crown Prince Bu
- Successor: Crown Prince Ji
- Born: 14 June 1575; Gyeongbokgung, Hanseong, Joseon
- Died: 7 August 1641 (aged 66); Jeju-mok, Jeolla Province, Joseon
- Burial: Gwanghaegunmyo, Namyangju, South Korea
- Spouse: Queen Yu (m. 1587; died 1623)
- Issue Detail: 4 sons, 1 daughter
Names
- Yi Hon (이혼; 李琿)
Era dates
- Adopted the era name of the Ming dynasty (Note: Mallyeok (Wanli) (만력; 萬曆): 1608–1620 Taechang (Taichang) (태창; 泰昌): 1620–1621 Cheongye (Tianqi) (천계; 天啓): 1621–1623)
Regnal name
- Checheon Heungun Jundeok Honggong Sinseong Yeongsuk Heummun Inmu Seoryun Ibki Myeongseong Gwangryeol Yungbong Hyeonbo Mujeong Junghui Yecheol Jangui Jangheon Sunjeong Geonui Sujeong Changdo Sungeob (체천흥운준덕홍공신성영숙흠문인무서륜입기명성광렬융봉현보무정중희예철장의장헌순정건의수정창도숭업; 體天興運俊德弘功神聖英肅欽文仁武敍倫立紀明誠光烈隆奉顯保懋定重熙睿哲莊毅章憲順靖建義守正彰道崇業) (Note: Known as honorific name (존호; 尊號) in the Sinosphere, its closest equivalent in the English-speaking world is the regnal name.)
- Clan: Jeonju Yi
- Dynasty: Yi
- Father: King Seonjo
- Mother: Concubine Gong (biological); Queen Uiin (adoptive)
- Religion: Confucianism (Neo-Confucianism)

Korean name
- Hangul: 광해군
- Hanja: 光海君
- Lit.: "Prince Gwanghae"
- RR: Gwanghaegun
- MR: Kwanghaegun

Childhood name
- Hangul: 경룡
- Hanja: 慶龍
- RR: Gyeongryong
- MR: Kyŏngnyong

Gwanghaegun or Prince Gwanghae (Korean: 광해군; Hanja: 光海君; 14 June 1575 – 7 August 1641), (Note: In the Korean calendar (lunisolar), he was born on the 26th day of the 4th lunar month and died on the 1st day of the 7th lunar month.) personal name Yi Hon, was the 15th monarch of Joseon. The second son of King Seonjo, he was deposed in a coup d'état led by his nephew, Prince Neungyang (King Injo). As an overthrown king, he did not receive a temple name.

== Biography ==
=== Birth and background ===
Gwanghaegun was the second son of King Seonjo; he was born to Concubine Gong, a royal consort of the first senior rank, who died a year after his birth. He had one elder brother.

When Sengoku Japan, managed by Toyotomi Hideyoshi, invaded Joseon in the Imjin War (1592–1598), he was installed as Crown Prince. When the king fled north to the border of the Ming, he established a branch court and fought defensive battles. Gwanghaegun acted as the de facto ruler of Joseon beginning in 1592, commanding battles and taking care of the reconstruction of the nation after the devastating wars in place of old and weak King Seonjo.

Although it conferred prestige on him, his position remained unstable. He had an elder but incompetent full-brother, Prince Imhae (임해군; 臨海君), and a younger but legitimate half-brother, Grand Prince Yeongchang (영창대군; 永昌大君), who was supported by the Lesser Northerners faction. Fortunately for Gwanghae, King Seonjo's abrupt death made it impossible for his favourite son, Yeongchang, to succeed to the throne.

=== Violence of Greater Northerner faction ===
Before King Seonjo died in 1608, he designated Gwanghae as his official successor and ordered his advisers to draft a royal decree. However, Yu Yeong-gyong of the Lesser Northerners faction hid the document and plotted to install Grand Prince Yeongchang as king, only to be found out by the head of the Great Northerners faction (대북; 大北), Chŏng Inhong of the Seosan Jeong clan. Yu was executed immediately.

After the incident, Gwanghae tried to bring officials from various political and regional backgrounds to his court, but his plan was interrupted by Greater Northerners, including Yi I-cheom and Chŏng Inhong. Then, Greater Northerners began to remove members of other political factions from the government, particularly the Lesser Northerners. In 1613, the Greater Northerners moved against Grand Prince Yeongchang; his maternal grandfather, Kim Je-nam, and his maternal uncles were found guilty of treason and executed, while Yeongchang was exiled and executed in 1614. At the same time, Greater Northerners suppressed the Lesser Northerners. In 1618, with the help of the kungnyŏ Kim Kaesi, Grand Prince Yeongchang's mother, Queen Inmok, was stripped of her title and imprisoned along with his younger half-sister, Princess Jeongmyeong. Gwanghae had no power to stop this even though he was the official head of the government.

=== Achievements ===
Despite his poor reputation after his death, he was a talented and pragmatic politician. He endeavored to restore the country and sponsored the restoration of documents. As a part of reconstruction, he revised land ordinance and redistributed land to the people; he also ordered the rebuilding of Changdeokgung along with several other palaces. Additionally, he was responsible for reintroducing the hopae identification system after a long period of disuse.

In foreign affairs, he sought a balance between the Ming Empire and the Jurchen people. Since he realized Joseon was unable to compete with Manchu military power, he tried to maintain a friendly relationship with the Jurchens while the kingdom was still under the suzerainty of Ming, which angered the Ming and dogmatic Confucian Koreans. The critically worsened Manchu-Ming relationship forced him to send ten thousand soldiers to aid Ming in 1619. However, the Battle of Sarhū ended in Manchu's overwhelming victory. The Korean General Gang Hong-rip lost two-thirds of his troops and surrendered to Nurhaci. Gwanghaegun negotiated independently for peace with the Jurchen, and thereby avoided another war. He also restored diplomatic relations with Japan in 1609, reopening trade through the Treaty of Giyu with the Sō clan of Tsushima, and sent his ambassadors to Japan in 1617.

In the domestic sphere, Gwanghaegun implemented the Daedong law, which facilitated tax payment for his subjects. However, this law was implemented only in Gyeonggi Province, the largest granary zone at the time, and it took a century for it to be extended across the entire kingdom. He encouraged publication to accelerate reconstruction and restore the kingdom's former prosperity. Many books were written during his reign, including the medical book Donguibogam, and several historical records were rewritten.

In 1616, tobacco was first introduced to Joseon, and it soon became popular amongst the yangban.

=== Dethronement and later life ===
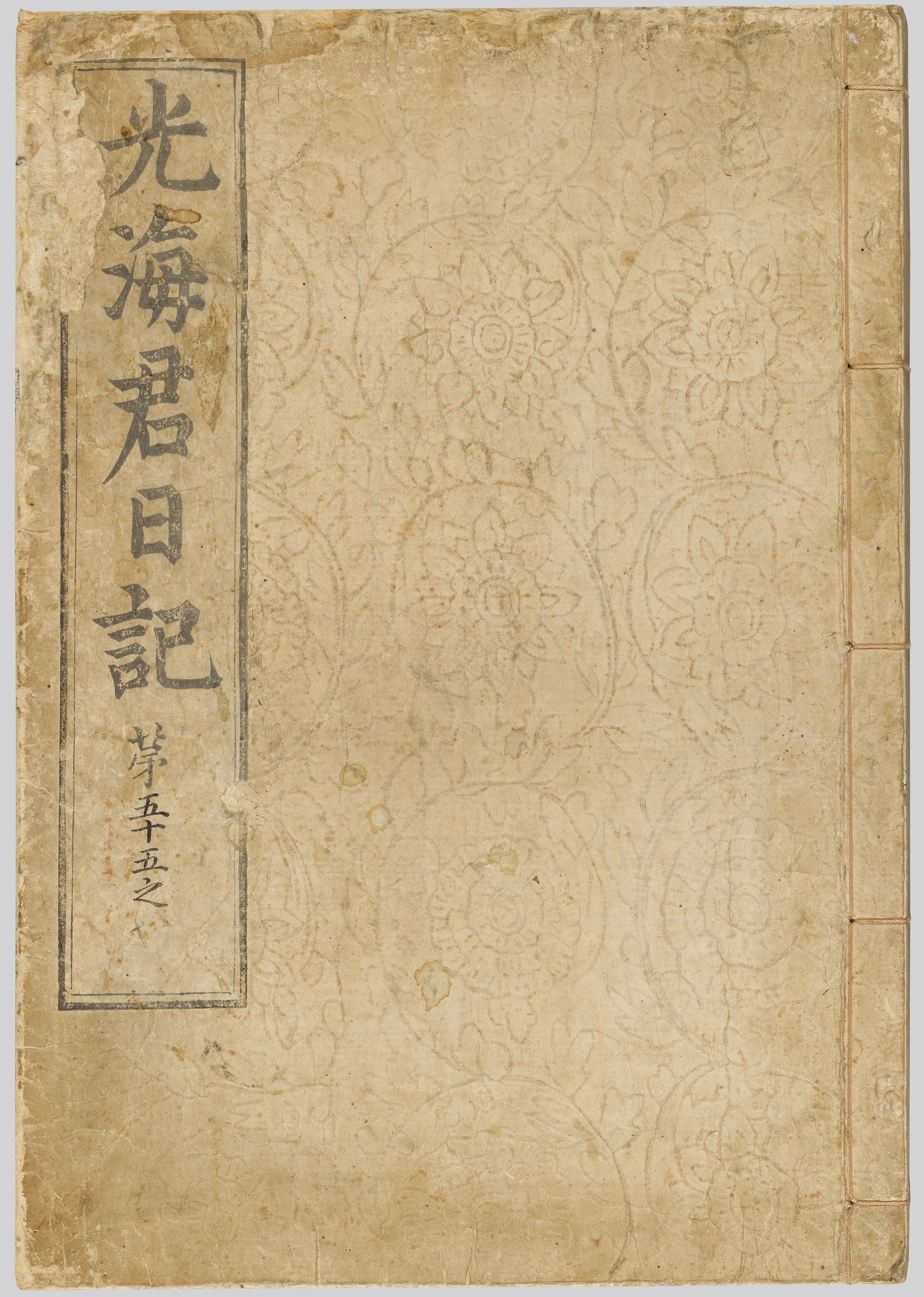
Gwanghaegun's diary

On April 11, 1623, Gwanghaegun was deposed in a coup by the Westerners faction that was crucially justified by Queen Inmok who was freed from prison during the coup. The coup directed by Kim Yu took place at night, Gwanghaegun fled but was captured later. He was confined first on Ganghwa Island and then on Jeju Island, where he died in 1641. He does not have a royal mausoleum like the other Joseon rulers. His and Lady Ryu's remains were buried at a comparatively humble site in Namyangju in Gyeonggi Province. The Westerners faction installed Neungyanggun as the sixteenth king Injo who promulgated pro-Ming and anti-Manchu policies, which resulted in two subsequent Manchu invasions.

== Legacy ==
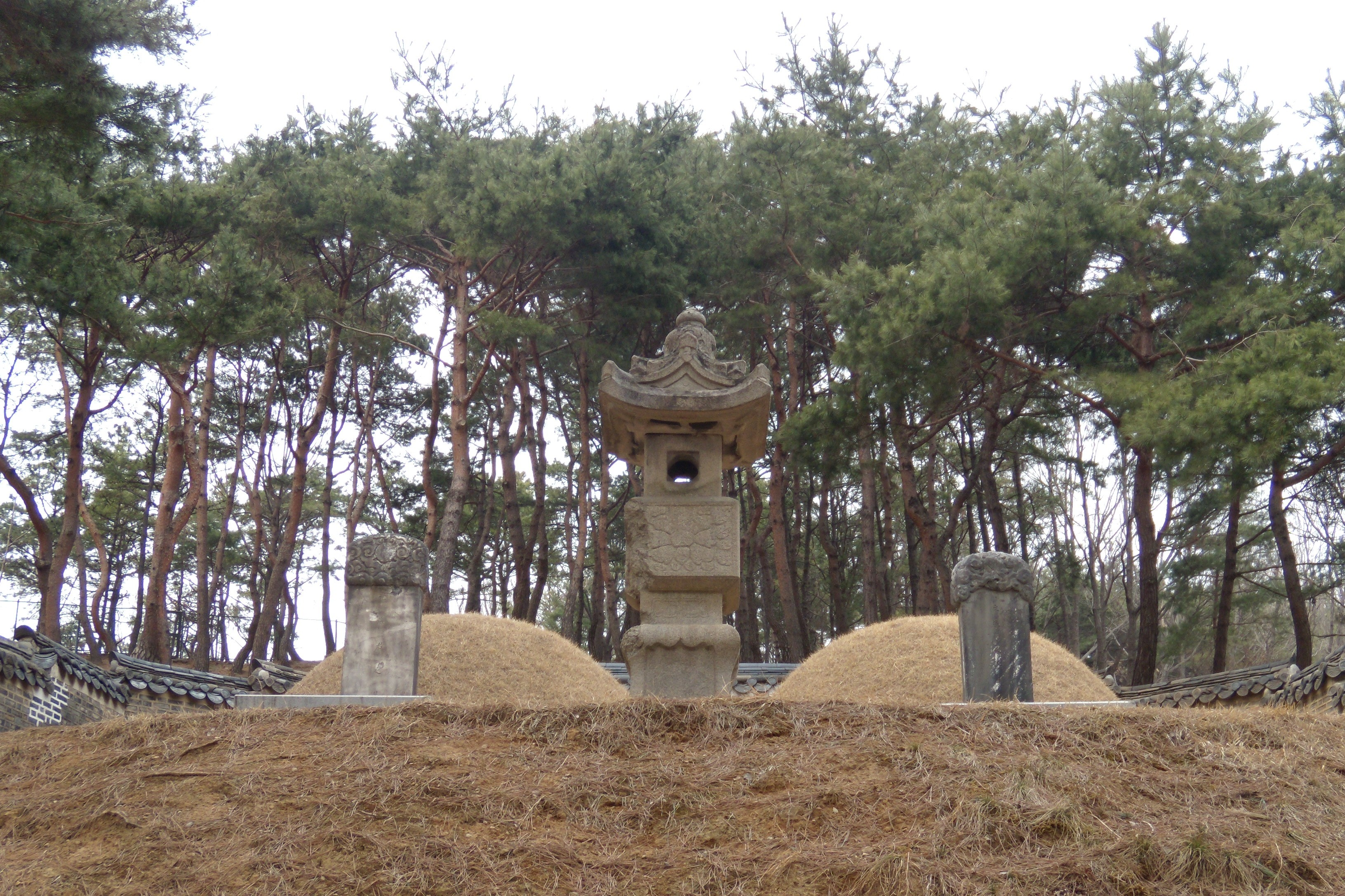
Gwanghaegun's tomb

Gwanghaegun is one of only two deposed kings who were not restored and given a temple name (the other one being Yeonsangun).

He remains a polarizing figure among historians. Historian Oh Hang-nyeong strongly criticized the king, writing that he "practically used up the country's entire budget solely for the construction of palaces, his policies were flawed and moreover, he was absent in many of the cabinet meetings. Gwanghaegun failed to communicate with his servants and with his people." However, historian Lee Duk-il praised the king, did that he "indeed made some political errors, but during his reign, the famous oriental medical book 'Donguibogam' was published and he created the tax system 'Daedong law' that was enforced for the benefit of the people." Despite the controversy over the king's handling of domestic policies, most historians have a positive assessment of Gwanghae's acts regarding foreign affairs.

== Family ==
- Father: King Seonjo (선조대왕; 6 December 1552 – 16 March 1608)
  - Biological grandfather: Grand Internal Prince Deokheung (덕흥대원군; 2 April 1530 – 14 June 1559)
  - Adoptive grandfather: King Myeongjong (명종대왕; 13 July 1532 – 12 August 1567)
  - Biological grandmother: Grand Internal Princess Consort Hadong (하동부대부인), of the Hadong Jeong clan (하동 정씨; 24 September 1530 – 24 June 1567)
  - Adoptive grandmother: Queen Insun (인순왕후), of the Cheongsong Shim clan (청송 심씨; 7 July 1532 – 22 February 1575)
- Biological mother: Concubine Gong (공빈), of the Gimhae Kim clan (김해 김씨; 26 November 1553 – 23 June 1577)
  - Grandfather: Kim Hui-cheol (김희철; 1519–1592)
  - Grandmother: Lady, of the Andong Gwon clan (안동 권씨; 1538–?)
- Adoptive mother: Queen Uiin (의인왕후), of the Bannam Park clan (반남 박씨; 15 May 1555 – 26 July 1600)
- Stepmother: Queen Inmok (인목왕후), of the Yonan Kim clan (연안 김씨; 15 December 1584 – 13 August 1632)

Consort(s) and their respective issue

- Queen (왕비), of the Munhwa Yu clan (문화 유씨; 25 August 1576 – 21 October 1623)
  - Unnamed child (1592) (Note: Uncertain gender; most likely male.)
  - Unnamed son (1596)
  - Yi Ji (이지), Crown Prince (왕세자; 31 December 1598 – 22 July 1623), first son
  - Unnamed son (1601–1603)
- Concubine Su (수빈), of the Yangcheon Heo clan (양천 허씨; 1595–?), given name Jeong-sun (정순)
- Gwiin (귀인), of the Papyeong Yun clan (파평 윤씨; 1602 – 13 April 1623), given name Yeong-sin (영신)
  - Lady, of the Jeonju Yi clan (전주 이씨; 23 June 1619 – 1 November 1664)
- Gwiin (귀인), of the Pungsan Hong clan (풍산 홍씨)
- Soui (숙의), of the Andong Gwon clan (안동 권씨)
- Sugui (숙의), of the Wonju Won clan (원주 원씨)
- Soyong (소용), of the Dongnae Jeong clan (동래 정씨; 1596 – 12 April 1623)
- Soyong (소용), of the Pungcheon Im clan (풍천 임씨; 1598 – 20 January 1628), given name Ae-young (애영)
- Sowon (소원), of the Yeongsan Shin clan (영산 신씨)
- Sugwon (숙원), of the Han clan (한씨), given name Bo-hyang (보향)
- Palace Lady (상궁), of the Kim clan (김씨; 1584–1623), given name Gae-si (개시) (Note: Sanggung (상궁; 尚宫); female official of the senior fifth rank in the internal court.)
- Palace Lady (상궁), of the Yi clan (이씨)
- Palace Lady (상궁), of the Choe clan (최씨)
- Palace Lady (궁인), of the Gimje Jo clan (김제 조씨)
- Palace Lady (궁인), of the Wonju Byun clan (원주 변씨)

== Ancestry ==
Ancestors of Gwanghaegun of Joseon

King Seongjong (성종대왕)
King Jungjong (중종대왕)
Queen Jeonghyeon, of the Papyeong Yun clan (정현왕후 파평 윤씨)
Grand Internal Prince Deokheung (덕흥대원군)
An Tan-dae (안탄대)
Concubine Chang, of the Ansan An clan (창빈 안산 안씨)
Lady, of the Hwang clan (황씨)
King Seonjo (선조대왕)
Jeong Sang-jo (정상조)
Jeong Se-ho (Note: Grandson of Jeong In-ji.) (정세호)
Lady, of the Juksan An clan (죽산 안씨)
Grand Internal Princess Consort Hadong, of the Hadong Jeong clan (하동부대부인 하동 정씨)
Lady, of the Gwangju Yi clan (광주 이씨)
Gwanghaegun
Kim Se-gyun (김세균)
Kim Jong-su (김종수)
Lady, of the Jinju Gang clan (진주 강씨)
Kim Hui-cheol (김희철)
Jeong Seung-u (정승우)
Lady, of the Hadong Jeong clan (하동 정씨)
Concubine Gong, of the Gimhae Kim clan (공빈 김해 김씨)
Gwon So (권소)
Gwon Jang (권장)
Lady, of the Andong Gwon clan (안동 권씨)
Lady, of the Gimhae Heo clan (김해 허씨)

== In popular culture ==
- Portrayed by Kim Kyu-chul in the 1995 KBS2 TV series West Palace.
- Portrayed by Kim Seung-soo in the 1999–2000 MBC TV series Hur Jun.
- Portrayed by Ji Sung in the 2003 SBS TV series The King's Woman.
- Portrayed by Lee In in the 2004–2005 KBS1 TV series Immortal Admiral Yi Sun-sin.
- Portrayed by Jo Hee-bong in the 2008 KBS2 TV series Hong Gil-dong.
- Portrayed by Lee Ho-seong in the 2008 MBC TV series Tamra, the Island.
- Portrayed by Lee Byung-hun in the 2012 film Masquerade.
- Portrayed by Lee Sang-yoon and Noh Young-hak in the 2013 MBC TV series Goddess of Fire.
- Portrayed in the 2013 web novel Gwanghae's Lover by Euodia.
- Portrayed by In Gyo-jin in the MBC TV series Hur Jun, The Original Story.
- Portrayed by Seo In-guk in the 2014 KBS2 TV series The King's Face.
- Portrayed by Cha Seung-won and Lee Tae-hwan in the 2015 MBC TV series Splendid Politics.
- Portrayed by Noh Young-hak in the 2015 KBS1 TV series The Jingbirok: A Memoir of Imjin War.
- Portrayed by Yeo Jin-goo in the 2017 film Warriors of the Dawn and the 2019 tvN TV series The Crowned Clown.
- Portrayed by Jung Joon-ho in the 2019 KBS2 TV series The Tale of Nokdu.
- Portrayed by Jang Hyun-sung in the 2020 film The Swordsman.
- Referenced in the lyrics and music video of the 2020 song Daechwita by Agust D.
- Portrayed by Kim Tae-woo in the 2021 MBN TV series Bossam: Steal the Fate.
- Portrayed by Choi Won-myeong in the 2025 Netflix TV series Heo's Diner.

== See also ==
- History of Korea
- List of monarchs of Korea
- Styles and titles in Joseon
- Politics of Joseon

== Notes ==
Gwanghaegun of Joseon House of Yi Born: 14 June 1575 Died: 7 August 1641
Royal titles
Preceded by Seonjo	King of Joseon; 16 March 1608 – 13 April 1623	Succeeded by Injo
