= Princess Chŏngsin (daughter of Seonjo) =

Joseon princess (1583–1653)

Princess Chŏngsin (Korean: 정신옹주; 21 July 1583 – 14 February 1653) was a Joseon dynasty princess, daughter of Seonjo of Joseon by his consort, Concubine In of the Suwon Kim clan.

== Life ==
Princess Chŏngsin was born on 21 July 1583 as the first daughter of King Seonjo born by Soyong In. She already had three brothers at that time, including Prince Jeongwon. Her mother would have three more daughters and a son.

In 1591, the eldest princess was set to marry, and the King chose Sŏ Kyŏngju, son of Sŏ Sŏng (서성), the Chief Councillor of the Privy Council (판중추부사). Because of the Japanese invasion, the wedding was put on hold, and they married only in 1596. The couple had three sons and five daughters.

During the Jeongmyo War (1627), Princess Jeongshin, and the entire family fled with King Injo to Ganghwa Island, but later they returned to Hanseong.

== Family ==
- Father: Seonjo of Joseon (6 December 1552 – 6 March 1608)
  - Paternal grandfather: Deokheung Daewongun (2 April 1530 – 14 June 1559)
  - Paternal grandmother: Grand Internal Princess Consort Hadong of the Hadong Jeong clan (23 September 1522 – 24 June 1567)
- Mother: Royal Noble Consort In of the Suwon Kim clan (1555–1613)
  - Maternal grandfather: Kim Hanu (김한우; 1501–1577)
  - Maternal grandmother: Lady Yi of the Jeonju Yi clan

Consorts and their respective issues:

- Husband: Sŏ Kyŏngju, Prince Consort Talsŏng of the Daegu Seo clan (서경주 달성위, 1579–1643)
  - Sŏ Misaeng (서미생; 1597–1666), 1st daughter
    - Son-in-law: Kim Kyu of Yonan Kim clan (김규; 1596 – 1 June 1613), younger brother of Queen Inmok
  - Sŏ Chŏngni (서정리, 1599–1664), 1st son
  - Sŏ Yesaeng (서예생, born 1601), 2nd daughter
    - Son-in-law: Yi Myŏngin of the Jeonju Yi clan (이명인; 1601-?)
  - Sŏ Hwisaeng (서희생, born 1603), 3rd daughter
    - Son-in-law: Sim Hang of the Cheongseong Sim clan (심항 청송 심씨)
  - Sŏ Chisun (서지순, born 1614), 4th daughter
    - Son-in-law: Kwŏn U of the Andong Gwon clan (권우; 1610–1685)
  - Sŏ Chŏngri (서정리, born 1617), 2nd son
  - Sŏ Chihyo (서지효; 1620-?), 5th daughter
    - Son-in-law: Yi Manung of the Jeonui Yi clan (전의 이씨 이만웅)
  - Sŏ Chinri (서진리; 1621–1661), 3rd son
