= Princess Jeongmyeong =

Princess of Joseon (1603–1685)

- Born: 27 June 1603; Jeongneung-dong, Hanseong, Joseon
- Died: 8 September 1685 (aged 82); Andongbyeol Palace, Northern Anguk-bang, Hanseong, Joseon
- Burial: Ori-dong, Paju, Gyeonggi Province?
- Spouse: Hong Ju-won (m. 1623; died 1672)
- Issue: Hong Tae-mang; Hong Man-yong; Hong Man-hyeong; Hong Man-hui; Hong Tae-ryang; Hong Tae-yuk; Hong Tae-im; Hong Man-hoe
- House: House of Yi (by birth); Pungsan Hong (by marriage)
- Father: King Seonjo
- Mother: Queen Inmok

Korean name
- Hangul: 정명공주
- Hanja: 貞明公主
- RR: Jeongmyeong gongju
- MR: Chŏngmyŏng kongju

Princess Jeongmyeong (Korean: 정명공주; 27 June 1603 – 8 September 1685 (Note: In the Korean calendar (lunisolar), she was born on 19 May 1603 and died on 10 August 1685.)) was a Joseon Royal Princess as the tenth daughter of King Seonjo from Queen Inmok. During her older half-brother's reign, she suffered hardships, and her title was revoked, but later it was reinstated after her half-nephew ascended the throne. Due to this, her life was believed to have been as brittle and unfortunate like her ancestor and her descendant who were famous for their unfortunate fates as the Princess of Joseon and Korean Empire.

== Biography ==
=== Early life ===
Princess Jeongmyeong was born on 27 June 1603 as the only daughter of Seonjo of Joseon and Queen Inmok. At this time, her father was already 52 years old, and her mother was 19 years old. She had a younger sister who died prematurely and a younger brother, Yi Ui.

Through her mother, the princess already had distant royal blood. From her maternal grandfather's side, she was the 7th great-granddaughter of Princess Jeongui and, from her maternal grandmother's side, her 7th great-grandfather was Grand Prince Imyeong. Princess Jeongui was the older sister of King Munjong, King Sejo, and Grand Prince Imyeong. Thus making the princess the 8th great-granddaughter of Queen Soheon and King Sejong.

The age gap had made it seem like Princess Jeongmyeong was Seonjo's granddaughter but despite the age difference, he favoured and showed affection towards Jeongmyeong, she becoming his favourite daughter. However, her father died on 16 March 1608 at 55 years old when she was 6 years old and when her younger brother was 3 years old.

=== Gwanghaegun's rise to the throne and Confinement ===
After her father's death, her older half-brother, Crown Prince Gwanghae took over the throne, both of her maternal grandfather, Kim Je-Nam and her younger brother, Grand Prince Yeongchang were involved in Gyechuk Oksa (계축옥사), and were to be executed for contempt and plotting against the king.

Her grandfather was executed in 1613. Followed by her younger brother, Grand Prince Yeongchang who died from poisoning at 9 years old in 1614. This was because Gwanghaegun had seen the young prince as a threat to this position as a king. She and her mother were then incarcerated and imprisoned at the West Palace (서궁).

As a child, she liked to write and when she was confined in the West Palace, she wrote letters that resembled her parents' handwriting, specifically her father's, to comfort her beloved mother, this writing was then known as Hwajeong (화정; 華政). But when she was about 30–40 years old, she stopped writing calligraphy and Chinese characters.

It was said that when she was 11 years old, she contracted Smallpox disease. Based on The Diary of Gyechuk (계축일기), Buk-in (북인; 北人), Gwanghae's supporters seemed very happy and pleased about this news. At this time, there was a superstition that smallpox was not curable, but it was enough to deliberately send meat that was not cut into pieces nearby. Since a Princess couldn't succeed the throne, it was assumed that her mother and her younger brother actually wanted smallpox to die rather than wishing for her to die.

When the Seo-in faction (서인; 西人) had made sure they couldn't leave the palace, the Princess's mother, Queen Inmok feared that her daughter would be taken away and lied that the Princess had already died. During this time, in 1618, she was 16 years old. In 1623, 5 years later, Gwanghae was deposed from his position and was succeeded by Prince Neungyang (능양군).

=== Marriage ===
After the deposition of Gwanghaegun, there was a talk within court officials on having her mother, who became Queen Dowager (대비; 大妃), be demoted and just become a royal consort (후궁; 後宮) so that the Princess will just be an Ongju (옹주; 翁主), a princess of second rank. Yi Yi-cheom (이이첨) had to force the Princess to get married and live outside the palace so that her marriage will just be that of an Ongju (옹주; 翁主). However, the Princess's mother, who had lost and parted with her son during this period, didn't want to lose and part again with her only daughter, so she immediately applied to her stepson, Gwanghaegun of Joseon to free her daughter.

Later, in 1623, when her half nephew, Injo of Joseon succeeded Gwanghae's throne, she was reinstated and allowed to live in Changdeokgung (창덕궁; 昌德宮) along with her mother. At this time, she was around 20-years-old, which was a difficult age to marry because the Princess was considered too old to marry as girls usually married at a young age during this time period. As she couldn't find a husband who was similar to her age, she decided to choose someone younger than her. Since the other Princesses had already married a long time ago, it had made it seem that she married the latest among the Joseon Princesses at the time.

But in fact, her half-sisters and her half-nieces got married at an older age than her, so the court ordered her to marry in hurry. The reason why her marriage was postponed was unknown but it seemed because of the circumstances along this period, or maybe because the Princess's mother who feared that if she was married, she wouldn't be able to live in the palace and live peacefully within her in-law's house.

Then, on 26 September 1623, there was a selection (간택; Gantaek) to be her husband and there were only 9 chosen. The winner of this selection was Hong Ju-won, the son of Hong Yeong (홍영) from the Pungsan Hong clan (풍산 홍씨), but at that time, Hong Ju-won, who was younger than the 21-year-old princess, was 18 years old. It was also said that Hong Ju-won already had a fiancée, and had to break off the engagement to marry the Princess.

Meanwhile, in the process, the Princess's mother, now Queen Dowager Soseong, made a problem with even down Hong Ju-Won to the horse that only the King could ride. At this, Injo, who is the new King of Joseon, was in disagreement, but he could not blame nor punish the Dowager Queen because he still respected her and regarded her as his parent. After the marriage, Injo gave Ingyeong Palace (인경궁) to her as her manor with Hong, and also gave her Jeong-cheol (정철). However, feared of suspicion of artificiality, she deliberately turned away from politics and only concentrated on sewing and housework.

Originally, Gyeongguk Daejeon (경국대전) stipulated that the princess's house couldn't exceed 50 periods, but her house was 200 years old until now. In Gyeongsang Province, she enjoyed tremendous luxury, such as being given a large land reaching 8,076 units. Now, this land whom was given to the Princess is the notorious pitfall of tenancy disputes until the Japanese colonial era.

She later bore Hong Ju-won 7 sons and 1 daughter, but only 4 sons and the daughter survived to adulthood. Which, through her second eldest son, Hong Man-yong; her great-great-great-granddaughter, Lady Hyegyŏng, eventually married her great-great-great-great half-grandnephew, Crown Prince Sado. Crown Prince Sado was the grandson of her great-great half-grandnephew, King Sukjong.

Her third eldest son, Hong Man-hyeong, married Queen Inhyeon's paternal aunt, and eventually became the great-great-great-grandparents of Royal Noble Consort Won; who was the concubine of her great-great-great-great-great-grandnephew, and great-great-great-great-grandson, King Jeongjo.

=== After Queen Inmok's death ===
After her mother's death, there were some suspicions of King Injo and King Hyojong due to the letters that were found in the palace in the Queen Dowager's living quarters. Then, Princess Jeongmyeong, and the court ladies who accompanied and involved, were arrested one after one and in a row, suffered not only several sentences and torture, but also death sentences. Even after getting torture and several sentences, she received the best treatment as an adult from her families during the King Hyeonjong and King Sukjong's reign.

=== Later life ===
The Princess outlived her husband by 13 years, living from her father, King Seonjo's reign, until her step great-great-grandnephew, King Sukjong's reign. She later died on 8 September 1685 at 82 years old. After her death, she was buried near her husband's tomb. She was the Princess who had lived the longest among all of Joseon Princesses in Joseon history records.

== Family ==
- Father: King Seonjo of Joseon (26 November 1552 – 16 March 1608)
- Mother: Queen Inmok of the Yonan Kim clan (15 September 1584 – 16 August 1632)
- Sibling(s)
  - Unnamed younger sister (1604–1604)
  - Younger brother: Yi Ui, Grand Prince Yeongchang (영창대군 이의; 12 April 1606 – 19 April 1614)
- Husband: Hong Ju-won, Prince Consort Yeongan (영안위 홍주원; 1606 – 3 November 1672)
- Issue(s):
  - Son: Hong Tae-mang (홍태망; 洪台望; 1625–1631); died young
  - Son: Minister of Rites Hong Man-yong, Duke Jeonggan (예조판서 정간공 홍만용; 禮曹判書 貞簡公 洪萬容; 1631–1692)
  - Son: Hong Man-hyeong (홍만형; 洪萬衡; 1633–1670)
  - Son: Hong Man-hui (홍만희; 洪萬熙; 1635–1670)
  - Son: Hong Tae-ryang (홍태량; 洪台亮; 1637–1642); died young
  - Son: Hong Tae-yuk (홍태육; 洪台六; 1639–1645); died young
  - Daughter: Hong Tae-im (홍태임; 洪台妊), Lady Hong of the Pungsan Hong clan (풍산 홍씨; 豊山 洪氏; 1641–?)
  - Son: Hong Man-hoe (홍만회; 洪萬恢; 1643–1710)

== In popular culture ==
=== Drama and television series ===
- Portrayed by Park Rusia in the 1995 KBS2 TV series West Palace.
- Portrayed by Han Min in the 2014 tvN TV series The Three Musketeers.
- Portrayed by Heo Jung-eun, Jung Chan-bi, and Lee Yeon-hee in the 2015 MBC TV series Splendid Politics.
- Portrayed by Kim Seo-an in the 2021 MBN TV series Bossam: Steal the Fate.

=== Novel ===
- Portrayed in the Naver Novel Series The Novel of Princess Jeongmyeong (소설 정명공주).

=== Webtoon ===
- Portrayed in the 2019 KakaoPage Webtoon series Finally, The Blue Flame (마침내 푸른 불꽃이).
