= Hong Ju-won =

Joseon nobleman (1606–1672)

Hong Ju-won 홍주원
- Prince Consort Yeongan
- Born: 1606; Joseon
- Died: 3 November 1672 (aged 67); Joseon
- Spouses: Princess Jeongmyeong (m. 1623–1672)
- Issue: 7 sons and 1 daughter
- House: Pungsan Hong clan
- Father: Hong Yeong
- Mother: Lady Yi of the Yeonan Yi clan
- Religion: Neo-confucianism

Korean name
- Hangul: 홍주원
- Hanja: 洪柱元
- RR: Hong Juwon
- MR: Hong Chuwŏn

Art name
- Hangul: 무하당
- Hanja: 無何堂
- RR: Muhadang
- MR: Muhadang

Courtesy name
- Hangul: 건중
- Hanja: 建中
- RR: Geonjung
- MR: Kŏnjung

Posthumous name
- Hangul: 문의
- Hanja: 文懿
- RR: Munui
- MR: Munŭi

Formal name
- Hangul: 영안위
- Hanja: 永安尉
- RR: Yeonganwi
- MR: Yŏnganwi

Hong Ju-won (Korean: 홍주원; Hanja: 洪柱元; 1606 – 3 November 1672), (Note: In the Korean calendar (lunar), Hong was born on August 1606 and died on 14 September 1672) formally called Lord Yeongan (영안위; 永安尉), of the Pungsan Hong clan (풍산 홍씨; 豊山 洪氏), was a Joseon nobleman and the husband of Princess Jeongmyeong, only daughter of King Seonjo and Queen Inmok. He was a great-great-great-grandfather of Lady Hyegyŏng, Crown Prince Sado's wife.

As a child, Hong learned how to write from his maternal grandfather, Yi Jeong-gwi (이정귀), and from Kim Ryu (김류). (Note: He is the son of Kim Yeo-mul who had Sasechungryeolmun dedicated to him and his family) In addition, he enjoyed playing with scholars in search of scenic spots. Hong also had a deep friendship with Jo Seok-yun (조석윤) and Park Jang-won (박장원). It was said that he had soft and gentle personality.

== Marriage ==
It was said that Hong already had a fiancée before marrying Princess Jeongmyeong (정명공주) but was forced to break the engagement with her. In fact, in these periods, the marriage age was early when the status was high. So, most of men from yangban families with the same age as the royal princess were forced to take part in the marriage selection, and if selected, to eventually marry the princess. A man who has not yet married was either having difficulty to marry due to a problem, or was already engaged like Hong. However, for unknown reasons, he was delaying the marriage as it was impossible for a princess to marry a man with a flaw.

Later, on 26 September 1623, there was a selection (간택) to be Princess Jeongmyeong (정명공주)'s husband, and Hong was the winner. In this marriage, the Princess was 21-years-old who missed marriage due to her long confined life, so it was unlikely she could find a husband of the same age and had to choose a younger man. A day after the marriage, he was honoured as Prince Consort Yeongan or Lord Yeongan (영안위; 永安尉).

Meanwhile, when the dying outbreak arose, Right State Councilor Shin Heum (신흠) (Note: An in-law of King Seonjo, 12th cousin of Shin Rip, and a 13th cousin of Queen Inheon.) and Han Jun-gyeom, Internal Prince Seopyeong (한준겸 서평부원군), (Note: The father of Queen Inyeol) immediately notified the Dowager Queen, Seonjo's widow, and Queen Inyeol, the wife of King Injo.

A few months later, Hong's mother in-law, the Dowager Queen gave him the Eoseungma (어승마; 御乘馬) but she became ill and in 1629, when King Injo tried to comfort her, Hong's father, Hong Yeong (홍영) became Yejochamphan (예조참판). Two years later, in 1631, her health became so poor that to please her, Injo elevated Hong's qualities and bade him to surprise her with his wife, Princess Jeongmyeong.

Later, after the death of the Dowager Queen, a suspicious white note was found in the couple's residence. Several of the court ladies who served the Princess were involved and were arrested as well as sentenced to death.

== Later life ==
From 4 October 1647 until 27 February 1648, Hong went to Qing dynasty in Saeun Temple (사은사). In 1649, after Yi Ho ascended the throne as the 17th King of Joseon, Hong was honoured as "Gobucheongsicheongseungseubjeongsa" (고부청시청승습정사; 告訃請諡請承襲正使). He died on 3 November 1672 and received his posthumous name and courtesy name. With his marriage with the princess, they had 7 children but 5 only made it to adulthood. Princess Jeongmyeong lived until she died at the age of 82 in 1685.

== Others ==
=== Benefits about marriage with Princess Jeongmyeong ===
For Hong, it was an auspicious and normal marriage, but not only himself, his family, the Pungsan Hong clan received many benefits from this marriage. Such as having a close in-law relationship with the royal family and having government positions.

=== Descendants ===
This list is just for the notable people of Hong's descendants.

1. Hong Hyeon-ju, Prince Consort Yeongmyeong (홍현주 영명위), husband of Princess Sukseon
2. Hong Bong-han (홍봉한), father of Lady Hyegyŏng and Hong In-han (홍인한).
3. Hong Guk-yeong (홍국영)
4. Royal Noble Consort Won (원빈), consort of Jeongjo of Joseon

== Family ==
- Father: Hong Yeong (홍영; 1584–1645)
- Mother: Lady Yi of the Yeonan Yi clan (연안 이씨; 1583–1656)
- Wife: Princess Jeongmyeong (정명공주; 27 June 1603 – 8 September 1685)
  - Father-in-law: Yi Yeon, King Seonjo (조선선조 이연; 26 November 1552 – 16 March 1608)
  - Mother-in-law: Queen Inmok of the Yeonan Kim clan (인목왕후 김씨; 15 December 1584 – 13 August 1633)
- Children:
  - Son – Hong Tae-Mang (홍태망; 洪台望; 1625–?)
  - Son – Hong Man-Yong (홍만용; 禮曹判書; 1631–1692)
  - Son – Hong Man-Hyeong (홍만형; 洪萬衡; 1633–1670)
  - Son – Hong Man-hui (홍만희; 洪萬熙; 1635–1670)
  - Son – Hong Tae-ryang (홍태량; 洪台亮; 1637–?)
  - Son – Hong Tae-yuk (홍태육; 洪台六; 1639–?)
  - Daughter – Hong Tae-im (홍태임; 洪台妊), Lady Hong of the Pungsan Hong clan (1641–?)
  - Son – Hong Man-hoe (홍만회; 洪萬恢; 1643–1709)

== In popular culture ==
=== Drama and television series ===
- Portrayed by Seo Kang-joon, Yoon Chan-young, and Choi Kwon-soo in the 2015 MBC TV series Splendid Politics.
