= Gongbin Kim =

Korean royal consort (1553–1577)

- Royal Consort of the Senior First Rank
- Born: 26 November 1553; Wonju County, Gangwon Province, Joseon
- Died: 23 June 1577 (aged 23); Gyeongbokgung, Hanseong, Joseon
- Burial: Seongmyo, Namyangju, South Korea
- Consort of: King Seonjo
- Issue Detail: 2 sons
Regnal name
- ~~Gyeongnyeol Myeongheon~~ (경렬명헌; 敬烈明獻) (Note: Known as honorific name (존호; 尊號) in the Sinosphere, its closest equivalent in the English-speaking world is the regnal name.) (Note: From 1616 to 1623.) (Note: Previously "Gyeongnyeol Myeongsun" (경렬명순; 敬烈明順) in 1615.)
Posthumous name
- ~~Queen Jasuk Danin Gongseong~~ (자숙단인공성왕후; 慈淑端仁恭聖王后) (Note: From 1610 to 1623.)
- Clan: Gimhae Kim (by birth); Jeonju Yi (by marriage)
- Dynasty: Yi
- Father: Kim Hui-cheol
- Mother: Lady, of the Andong Gwon clan

Korean name
- Hangul: 공빈 김씨
- Hanja: 恭嬪金氏
- RR: Gongbin Gimssi
- MR: Kongbin Kimssi

Gongbin Kim (Korean: 공빈 김씨; Hanja: 恭嬪 金氏; 26 November 1553 – 23 June 1577), or Concubine Gong, (Note: The literal translation of bin (빈; 嬪) is "concubine". Combined with the honorific title gong (공; 恭), the full meaning is "Courteous Concubine".) of the Gimhae Kim clan, was a consort of King Seonjo, the 14th monarch of Joseon, and the biological mother of Gwanghaegun.

== Biography ==
=== Early life and lineage ===
Lady Kim was born during the reign of King Myeongjong as the third among six daughters. Her father was Kim Hui-cheol (김희철) and her mother was a lady from the Andong Gwon clan (안동 권씨).

=== As royal consort ===
Around 1571, Lady Kim passed the royal selection and entered the palace alongside Lady Jeong (later known as Gwiin Jeong). Originally a royal consort of the junior second rank (숙의; sugui), it appears she was raised to the junior first rank (귀인; gwiin) after giving birth to the king's eldest son, Yi Jin, in 1572. As Queen Uiin was unable to conceive, Lady Kim's status in the palace was unparalleled and she monopolized the king's love, leading to other consorts often being neglected. Following the birth of Yi Hon (later known as Gwanghaegun/Prince Gwanghae) in 1575, she was promoted to the senior first rank (빈; bin), with the honorific title gong (恭), meaning "courteous".

=== Death and aftermath ===
Lady Kim never fully recovered from childbirth and died from postartum complications two years after her younger son's birth, at the age of 23. She was buried within Seongmyo (성묘) in present-day Namyangju, Gyeonggi Province. During Gwanghaegun's reign, her tomb was designated as Seongreung (성릉) and she was briefly elevated to the position of queen, being conferred honorific and posthumous names. However, all honors were revoked after the Injo Restoration (인조반정) and she was demoted to her former rank.

When her life was in jeopardy, Lady Kim told Seonjo that she was dying because he hadn't investigated the matter of someone cursing her, causing him to treat the other consorts harshly. He deeply mourned her, but his grief began to diminish due to Concubine In frequent reminders of Lady Kim's flaws. Eventually, Concubine In's favor significantly exceeded that of her late rival and she came to pose a major threat to Gwanghaegun, whose position as crown prince was already shaky since he was neither the eldest nor the legitimate son and he lacked the support of a maternal family after Lady Kim's father was killed in action during the Imjin War.

== Titles ==
- During the reign of King Myeongjong (r. 1545–1567):
  - Lady, of the Gimhae Kim clan (김해 김씨; 金海金氏; from 26 November 1553)
    - Kim Hui-cheol's daughter (김희철의 딸)
    - Lady Kim (김씨; 金氏)
- During the reign of King Seonjo (r. 1567–1608):
  - Sugui (Note: lit. ''Lady of Warm Deportment'') (숙의; 淑儀; from unknown date), royal consort of the junior second rank
  - Gwiin (Note: lit. ''Noble Lady'') (귀인; 貴人; from unknown date), royal consort of the junior first rank
  - Concubine Gong (공빈; 恭嬪; from 1575), royal consort of the senior first rank
- During the reign of Gwanghaegun (r. 1608–1623):
  - Queen Gongseong (공성왕후; 恭聖王后; from 1610)
- During the reign of King Injo (r. 1623–1649):
  - Concubine Gong (공빈; 恭嬪; from 1623), royal consort of the senior first rank

== Family ==
- Father: Kim Hui-cheol (김희철; 1519–1592)
- Mother: Lady, of the Andong Gwon clan (안동 권씨)
- Sibling(s)
  - Lady, of the Gimhae Kim clan (김해 김씨; 1547–?); given name Hyo-ok (효옥) (Note: Married Yi Min-byeong (이민병) from the Gwangju Yi clan (광주 이씨).)
  - Lady, of the Gimhae Kim clan (김해 김씨; 1551–?); given name Deok-hae (덕해) (Note: Married Park Yun (박윤) from the Goryeong Park clan (고령 박씨).)
  - Lady, of the Gimhae Kim clan (김해 김씨; 1556–?); given name Deok-yeong (덕영) (Note: Married Seong Jun (성준) from the Changnyeong Seong clan (창녕 성씨).)
  - Lady, of the Gimhae Kim clan (김해 김씨; 1558–?); given name Cheon-hyang (천향) (Note: Married Yi Jun (이준), Deokin Jeong (덕인정; 1556–?); great-great-grandson of King Seongjong. [Biological lineage: King Seongjong → Prince Gyeonseong (견성군; 1482–1507) → Prince Gyesan (계산군; 1501–?) → Prince Pungseong (풍성군; 1525–?) → Deokin Jeong; Adoptive lineage: King Seongjong → Prince Hoesan (회산군; 1482–1512) → Prince Gyesan → Prince Pungseong → Deokin Jeong])
  - Lady, of the Gimhae Kim clan (김해 김씨; 1562–?); given name Cheon-jeong (천정) (Note: Married Park Geon (박건).)
  - Kim Ye-jik (김예직; 1565–1623) (Note: Adopted brother; biological son of Kim Hui-cheol's younger brother, Kim Hui-hyeon (김희현).) (Note: ▪︎Wife: Lady, of the Jeonju Yi clan (전주 이씨; 1567–?); great-great-granddaughter of King Seongjong. ▪︎Issue: 3 sons, 1 daughter. [Lineage: King Seongjong → Prince Yiseong (이성군; 1489–1553) → Prince Uicheon (의천군; 1524–1578) → Bokheung Su (복흥수) → Lady Yi])
- Consort of: King Seonjo (선조대왕; 6 December 1552 – 16 March 1608)
- Issue
  - Yi Jin (이진), Prince Imhae (임해군; 20 September 1572 – 2 June 1609)
  - Yi Hon (이혼), Gwanghaegun (광해군; 14 June 1575 – 7 August 1641)

== Ancestry ==
Ancestors of Gongbin Kim

Kim Yeong-jeong (김영정)
Kim Se-gyun (김세균)
Lady of the Jeonui Yi clan (전의 이씨)
Kim Jong-su (김종수)
Kang Yi-sul (강이술)
Lady, of the Jinju Kang clan (진주 강씨)
Kim Hui-cheol (김희철)
Jeong Gyeong-jo (정경조)
Jeong Seung-u (정승우)
Lady, of the Yeoju Yi clan (여주 이씨)
Lady, of the Hadong Jeong clan (하동 정씨)
Concubine Gong
Gwon Ho (권호)
Gwon So (권소)
Lady, of the Jinju Ha clan (진주 하씨)
Gwon Jang (권장)
Kim Gye-ham (김계함)
Lady, of the (old) Andong Kim clan (안동 김씨)
Lady, of the Andong Gwon clan (안동 권씨)
Lady, of the Gimhae Heo clan (김해 허씨)

== In popular culture ==
- Portrayed by Park Joo-mi in the 1999–2000 MBC TV series Hur Jur.
- Portrayed by Jang Ji-eun in the 2013 MBC TV series Hur Jun, The Original Story.
- Portrayed by Yu Shin-ae in the 2013 MBC TV series Goddess of Fire.

== See also ==
- History of Korea
- Styles and titles in Joseon
