= Splendid Politics =

2015 South Korean television series

- Promotional poster
- Also known as: Hwajung; Hwajung, Princess of Light
- Hangul: 화정
- Hanja: 華政
- RR: Hwajeong
- MR: Hwajŏng
- Genre: Historical; Political; Romance
- Written by: Kim Yi-young
- Directed by: Kim Sang-ho; Choi Jung-kyu
- Starring: Cha Seung-won; Lee Yeon-hee; Kim Jaewon; Seo Kang-joon; Han Joo-wan; Jo Sung-ha
- Composer: Kim Hyeon-jong
- Country of origin: South Korea
- Original language: Korean
- No. of seasons: 1
- No. of episodes: 50

Production
- Executive producer: Son Ki-won
- Producers: Lee Chang-sub; Yoo Hyeon-jong; Park Bo-kyung
- Cinematography: Kim Jong-jin; Lee Tae-hee
- Editor: Hwang Geum-bong
- Running time: 70 minutes
- Production company: Kim Jong-hak Production

Original release
- Network: Munhwa Broadcasting Corporation
- Release: April 13 – September 29, 2015

Splendid Politics (Korean: 화정; RR: Hwajeong) is a 2015 South Korean television series starring Cha Seung-won, Lee Yeon-hee, Kim Jaewon, Seo Kang-joon, Han Joo-wan and Jo Sung-ha. It aired on MBC from April 13 to September 29, 2015 on Mondays and Tuesdays at 22:00 for 50 episodes.

The Korean title Hwajeong is a shortened version of Hwaryeohan Jeongchi (literally "Splendid Politics").

== Plot ==
Prince Gwanghae (portrayed by Cha Seung-won), son of a concubine, usurps the Joseon throne from the direct bloodline of his father, King Seonjo (portrayed by Park Yeong-gyu).

After her younger brother, Grand Prince Yeongchang (portrayed by Jeon Jin-seo), is executed, Princess Jeongmyeong (portrayed by Lee Yeon-hee), who managed to flee the palace during the massacre, starts living as a commoner disguised as a man while plotting her revenge.

== Cast ==
=== Main ===
- Cha Seung-won as Yi Hon, Prince Gwanghae
  - Lee Tae-hwan as young Yi Hon
- Lee Yeon-hee as Princess Jeongmyeong
  - Jung Chan-bi as young Princess Jeongmyeong
  - Heo Jung-eun as child Princess Jeongmyeong
- Kim Jae-won as Prince Neungyang, later King Injo
- Seo Kang-joon as Hong Joo-won
  - Yoon Chan-young as young Hong Joo-won
  - Choi Kwon-soo as child Hong Joo-won
- Han Joo-wan as Kang In-woo
  - Ahn Do-gyu as young Kang In-woo
  - Lee Tae-woo as child Kang In-woo
- Jo Sung-ha as Kang Joo-sun, Kang In-woo's father

=== Supporting ===
==== Royal Household ====
- Park Yeong-gyu as King Seonjo
- Shin Eun-jung as Queen Inmok
- Choi Jong-hwan as Prince Imhae
- Jang Seung-jo as Prince Jeongwon, Prince Neungyang's father
- Kim Gyu-sun as Princess Jeonghye
- Jeon Jin-seo as Grand Prince Yeongchang
- Lee Seung-ah as Queen Inryeol
- Baek Sung-hyun as Crown Prince Sohyeon
- Kim Hee-jung as Crown Princess Minhoe
- Lee Tae-ri (Note: Credited as Lee Min-ho.) as Grand Prince Bongrim, later King Hyojong
  - Song Jun-hee as child Grand Prince Bongrim
- Kim Min-seo as Jo Yeo-jeong / Royal Consort So-yong of the Okcheon Jo clan
- Choi Woo-jin as Yi Jing, Prince Sungseon

==== Northern Faction (Gwanghae Group) ====
- Jung Woong-in as Lee Yi-cheom
- Kim Yeo-jin as Court Lady Kim Gae-shi
  - Jo Jung-eun as young Kim Gae-shi
  - Shin Rin-ah as child Kim Gae-shi
- Han Myung-koo as Chung In-hong
- Yoo Seung-mok as Yoo Hee-boon
- Jung Kyu-soo as Lee Choong
- Lee Jae-gu as the Chief Eunuch

==== Western Faction (Injo Group) ====
- Jo Min-ki as Kim Ja-jeom
- Park Jun-gyu as Kim Ryu
- Jang Gwang as Yi Gwi
- Kim Hyung-beom as Kim Kyung-jing, Kim Ryu's son
- Lee Seung-hyo as Lee Si-baek
- Kim Seo-kyung as Lee Si-bang
- Jung Wook as a State Ceremony Eunuch

==== People around Princess Jeongmyeong ====
- Im Ho as Choi Myung-gil
- Lee Jae-yong as Kim Sang-hun
- Kim Chang-wan as Lee Won-ik
- Kim Seung-wook as Lee Hang-bok
- Um Hyo-sup as Hong Yeong, Hong Joo-won's father
- Kim Young-im as Court Lady Jung
- Gong Myung as Ja-gyung
  - Kang Chan-hee as young Ja-gyung

==== Other subordinates ====
- Ahn Nae-sang as Heo Gyun
- Lee Sung-min as Lee Duk-hyung
  - Nam Da-reum as young Duk-hyung
- Park Ji-il as Kim Je-nam, Queen Inmok's father
- Jung Hae-kyun as Kang Hong-rib

=== Cameo ===
- Park Won-sang as Jang Bong-soo
- Kim Kwang-kyu as Yi Yeong-bu
- Kwak Dong-yeon as Yi Ui-rip
- Jo Jae-ryong as Bang-Geun
- Lee Seung-hyung as Yi-seo
- Kim Hyun as Court Lady Inspector
- Hwang Young-hee as Ok-joo
- Baek Su-ryeon as Soo Ryun-gae
- Lee Jae-gu
- Kim Ki-bang as Gu-bok
- Kim Kyu-chul
- Kang Shin-il
- Jung Ji-so as Eun-seol
- Kang Dae-hyun as Su-Deok
- Kang Moon-young as Lady Yoon, Kang Joo-sun's wife
- Kim So-yi as Court Lady Choi
- Baek Soo-ryun as Soo Ryun-gae
- Jang Hyuk-jin as Maruno
- Jung Sung-woon as Hong Taiji
- Kim Joon-bae as Yong Gol-dae

== Ratings ==
In the table below, the blue numbers represent the lowest ratings and the red numbers represent the highest ratings.

Episode #	Original broadcast date	Average audience share			
Episode #	Original broadcast date	TNmS Ratings		AGB Nielsen	
Episode #	Original broadcast date	Nationwide	Seoul National Capital Area	Nationwide	Seoul National Capital Area
1	2015-04-13	10.0%	12.3%	10.5%	12.0%
2	2015-04-14	10.5%	12.4%	11.8%	12.8%
3	2015-04-20	9.0%	11.6%	10.9%	12.6%
4	2015-04-21	10.4%	12.6%	10.8%	12.1%
5	2015-04-27	9.7%	12.1%	9.9%	11.2%
6	2015-04-28	10.0%	12.0%	10.9%	11.6%
7	2015-05-04	9.2%	10.9%	9.4%	10.2%
8	2015-05-05	9.9%	12.0%	10.3%	11.7%
9	2015-05-11	8.3%	9.8%	9.5%	10.8%
10	2015-05-12	9.3%	10.6%	10.1%	11.4%
11	2015-05-18	8.2%	9.9%	10.6%	12.4%
12	2015-05-19	9.2%	11.2%	11.4%	13.0%
13	2015-05-25	8.3%	10.2%	10.4%	11.5%
14	2015-05-26	8.9%	10.2%	11.0%	12.2%
15	2015-06-01	8.4%	9.9%	10.6%	12.5%
16	2015-06-02	9.1%	11.2%	10.2%	11.6%
17	2015-06-08	8.8%	11.1%	10.2%	11.9%
18	2015-06-09	11.0%	13.4%	11.0%	12.7%
19	2015-06-15	10.3%	12.1%	10.7%	12.4%
20	2015-06-16	9.3%	11.1%	11.0%	12.5%
21	2015-06-22	10.1%	11.8%	11.6%	13.3%
22	2015-06-23	9.9%	12.1%	10.7%	12.2%
23	2015-06-29	9.2%	10.8%	10.0%	10.8%
24	2015-06-30	9.7%	12.0%	9.8%	10.8%
25	2015-07-06	8.0%	9.8%	8.9%	9.8%
26	2015-07-07	8.4%	10.3%	8.8%	9.8%
27	2015-07-13	8.3%	10.6%	9.1%	10.2%
28	2015-07-14	7.6%	9.2%	9.8%	10.8%
29	2015-07-20	7.8%	9.8%	9.9%	10.9%
30	2015-07-21	9.4%	10.9%	11.4%	12.3%
31	2015-07-27	7.5%	9.2%	10.3%	11.5%
32	2015-07-28	9.2%	10.4%	10.3%	11.5%
33	2015-08-03	7.9%	9.3%	9.1%	10.7%
34	2015-08-04	9.2%	9.9%	9.8%	11.0%
35	2015-08-10	8.0%	9.5%	9.0%	10.5%
36	2015-08-11	8.6%	9.6%	10.7%	12.4%
37	2015-08-17	8.1%	9.6%	9.6%	10.4%
38	2015-08-18	8.8%	10.7%	9.7%	10.6%
39	2015-08-24	7.9%	8.7%	8.8%	10.5%
40	2015-08-25	8.2%	8.7%	9.0%	9.9%
41	2015-08-31	7.3%		8.5%	9.5%
42	2015-09-01	8.5%	10.1%	8.9%	9.6%
43	2015-09-07	7.3%	7.6%	8.1%	9.3%
44	2015-09-08	7.3%	7.8%	8.3%	9.1%
45	2015-09-14	7.1%	8.5%	8.1%	8.7%
46	2015-09-15	8.7%	10.3%	10.8%	12.2%
47	2015-09-21	7.4%	7.7%	9.7%	10.9%
48	2015-09-22	8.3%	9.3%	10.5%	12.1%
49	2015-09-28	5.6%	6.1%	5.7%	6.2%
50	2015-09-29	6.2%	7.2%	7.8%	8.8%
Average		8.7%	10.2%	9.9%	11.1%

== Awards and nominations ==
Year	Award	Category	Recipient	Result
2015	8th Korea Drama Awards	Grand Prize (Daesang)	Cha Seung-won	Nominated
2015	8th Korea Drama Awards	Excellence Award, Actor	Seo Kang-joon	Nominated
2015	8th Korea Drama Awards	Hot Star Award	Seo Kang-joon	Won
2015	4th APAN Star Awards	Top Excellence Award, Actor in a Serial Drama	Cha Seung-won	Nominated
2015	23rd Korea Cultural Entertainment Awards	Best Actor Award, Drama	Kim Jaewon	Won
2015	34th MBC Drama Awards	Grand Prize (Daesang)	Cha Seung-won	Nominated
2015	34th MBC Drama Awards	Top Excellence Award, Actor in a Special Project Drama	Cha Seung-won	Nominated
2015	34th MBC Drama Awards	Excellence Award, Actor in a Special Project Drama	Kim Jaewon	Nominated
2015	34th MBC Drama Awards	Excellence Award, Actress in a Special Project Drama	Lee Yeon-hee	Nominated
2015	34th MBC Drama Awards	Best Supporting Actor in a Special Project Drama	Jung Woong-in	Nominated
2015	34th MBC Drama Awards	Best New Actor in a Special Project Drama	Seo Kang-joon	Nominated
2015	34th MBC Drama Awards	Top 10 Stars Award	Cha Seung-won	Won
