= Grand Prince Yeongchang =

Grand Prince of Joseon (1606–1614)

Grand Prince of Joseon
- Reign: 1613–1614
- Coronation: 1613
- Born: Yi Ui; 12 April 1606; Hanseong-bu, Joseon
- Died: 19 March 1614 (aged 7); Ganghwa-do, Gyeonggi Province, Joseon
- Burial: Grand Prince Yeongchang's Mausoleum, San 24–5, Goeun-ri, Iljuk-myeon, Anseong-si, Gyeonggi Province
- Issue: Yi Pil, Prince Changseong (adopted)
- House: House of Yi
- Father: Yi Yeon, King Seonjo
- Mother: Queen Inmok of the Yeonan Kim clan

Korean name
- Hangul: 이의
- Hanja: 李㼁
- RR: I Ui
- MR: I Ŭi

Royal title
- Hangul: 영창대군
- Hanja: 永昌大君
- RR: Yeongchang daegun
- MR: Yŏngch'ang taegun

Grand Prince Yeongchang (Korean: 영창대군; 12 April 1606 – 19 March 1614), personal name Yi Ui, was a Joseon royal prince as the only legitimate son of King Seonjo, from Queen Inmok who was born when his father was already 55 years old. Due to this, Yeonguijeong Yu Yeong-gyeong (유영경) once tried to select Yeongchang as the Crown Prince (왕세자; 王世子) to replace his older half-brother, Crown Prince Yi Hon, which eventually caused him to be unjustly executed after Hon's ascension to the throne People often said that his sad life and death is equivalent to Chang of Goryeo.

== Biography ==
=== Crown Prince's throne ===
He become Grand Prince Yeongchang (영창대군; 永昌大君) when he was 6 years old. His father, Seonjo was aware with the fact that Gwanghae had already become the Crown Prince (왕세자; 王世子), then secretly discussed with Yu Yeong-Gyeong (유영경) and some of his servants about censure of the Prince. Seonjo also made plans to change the crown prince when he was born, but it was destroyed. Meanwhile, Seonjo with specifically asked 7 people, including Han Jun-Gyeom (한준겸) to follow the Prince in order to protect him. This was called Yugyochilsin (유교칠신; 遺敎七臣; lit. 'Confucian Chilsin'). Later, when Yi Yi-Cheom (이이첨) and Jeong In-Hong (정인홍) saw this, both of them argued that he shouldn't change the crown prince, but in fact, they went home and spreading unfounded rumors. When Seonjo suddenly died on 16 March 1608, Gwanghae, the Crown Prince took over the throne and then recruited them again.

Later, in 1613, Gyechukoksa (계축옥사) was made and Daebukpa (대북파) made a false confession to Bak Eung-Seo (박응서) and others of the conspiracy to elect the Prince and Kim Je-Nam (김제남), his maternal grandfather. The Prince was then abolished and exiled to Ganghwa-do. From July to November in the same year, Yang-sa (양사), Hongmungwan (홍문관; 弘文館) and Seungjeongwon (승정원; 承政院) alternately impeached them, but Gwanghae rejected they all.

In 1614, Yi Yi-Cheom's group ordered Ganghwabusa (강화부사; 江華府使) to Jeong-hang (정항; 鄭沆) and maliciously burned the Prince's room, also make him quit food. The young prince couldn't sit or lie on a hot floor day and night, grabbed a grate and cried. After this, Yi Yi-Cheom and Jeong-hang reported if the Prince died because of illness. At this time, he was still 7 years old.

=== Later life ===
At this time, Samsa (삼사) and Seungjeongwon (승정원) continued to appeal the punishment of Yeongchang.

But, some of Nam-in (남인; 南人), Il-bu (일부) and Seo-in (서인; 西人) opposed his punishment, also Sa-rim (사림) opposed his execution and claimed that although he and Gwanghae were a half brother because their mother was different, there was a righteousness between mother, child, and brothers. In addition, public opinion appeared in favor to him and asked if he would have intention to conspiring against him. However, due to the continued appeals from Daebukpa (대북파), the Prince died in his exile place on 19 March 1614.

After his death, his half big brother, Prince Gyeongchang (경창군)'s 4th son, Prince Changseong (창성군) become his adopted son for continuing the House of Yi Royal Family's line. Then, on 15 March 1623, due to his nephew, King Injo's new reign, he was restored and his title was given back to him.

=== After life ===
The Prince's body was transported and buried in 1614 (6th year reign of his half big brother, Gwanghaegun of Joseon) under Namhansanseong in Gwangju-gun, Gyeonggi Province, South Korea and his tomb was located in Goeun-ri, Iljuk-myeon, Anseong, Gyeonggi Province firstly, but later relocated in 1993 to Alleyway 4911, Taepyeong 3–dong, Seongnam. That tomb was also found damaged in five pieces during the plumbing of a city gas facility.

=== Legacy ===
His tomb, "Grand Prince Yeongchang's Mausoleum" (영창대군묘) was designated as the 75th Monument of Gyeonggi Province on 19 September 1983.

== Family ==
- Father
  - Yi Yeon, King Seonjo of Joseon (조선 선조; 26 November 1552 – 16 March 1608)
- Mother
  - Queen Inmok of the Yonan Kim clan (인목왕후 김씨; 15 December 1584 – 13 August 1632)
- Siblings
  - Older sister - Princess Jeongmyeong (정명공주; 27 June 1603 – 8 September 1685)
  - Unnamed older sister (1604–1604)
- Issue
  - Adoptive son - Yi Pil, Prince Changseong (창성군 필; 1627–1689) (Note: He was the 4th son of Yi-Ju, Prince Gyeongchang (경창군 이주; 1596–1644) and Lady Jo of the Changnyeong Jo clan (창녕 조씨; 1594–1648). Prince Gyeongchang was the son of King Seonjo and Royal Noble Consort Jeong of the Namyang Hong clan (정빈 홍씨; 1563–1638).)

== In popular culture ==
- Portrayed by Choi Kang-won in the 1995 KBS2 TV series West Palace.
- Portrayed by Kang-san in the 2003 SBS The King's Woman.
- Portrayed by Seol Woo-hyung in the 2014–2015 KBS2 TV series The King's Face.
- Portrayed by Jeon Jin-seo in the 2015 MBC TV series Splendid Politics.
