= Gang Hong-rip =

Korean general (1560–1627)

- Hangul: 강홍립
- Hanja: 姜弘立
- RR: Gang Hongrip
- MR: Kang Hongnip

Art name
- Hangul: 내촌
- Hanja: 耐村
- RR: Naechon
- MR: Naech'on

Courtesy name
- Hangul: 군신
- Hanja: 君信
- RR: Gunsin
- MR: Kunsin

Gang Hong-rip (Korean: 강홍립; Hanja: 姜弘立; 1560 – 6 September 1627) was a Korean general during the Joseon period.

Under repeated requests from Ming China, Gwanghaegun commanded Gang Hongrip to help Ming forces with ten thousand soldiers against the Manchus in 1619. However, Ming armies were crushed in the Battle of Sarhū. The Korean army under command of Liu Ting lost two-thirds of his troops at Fuca and surrendered to Nurhaci. Official Korean records say that Gwanghaegun had ordered a betrayal to Nurhaci, but it is suspected to be a defamation by the Westerners faction, who deposed the king. In 1620 almost all Korean captives were released but Gang Hongrip, who had good command of the Manchu language, was still kept.

Frustrated with unsatisfactory reward for the coup which deposed Gwanghaegun, Yi Gwal rebelled against King Injo in 1624. He temporarily occupied Hanseong (modern-day Seoul), but was eventually crushed. Yi Gwal was then executed by his own soldiers. Han Myeong-nyeon, an accomplice of Yi Gwal, was also killed, but his son Han Yun fled to the Later Jin (Manchus).

Gang Hongrip fell for Han Yun's trick and wrongly believed that his family was all killed by the Joseon government. To get his revenge on Korea, he urged the Manchus to defeat the Joseon dynasty. In 1627 he guided the Later Jin army led by Amin to Hanseong and as a Manchu delegate he negotiated for a truce with Korea. Then he discovered that he was deceived about his family being killed and suffered a heartbreak. He was branded as a traitor and deprived of his official rank. He was rehabilitated after his death.

== Family ==
Parents

- Father - Gang Shin (판중추부사 강신; 姜紳; 1543–1615)
- Mother - Lady Jeong of the Dongrae Jeong clan (동래 정씨)
  - Grandfather - Jeong Yu-ui (정유의; 鄭惟義)

Wives and issues:

- Lady Hwang of the Wooju Hwang clan (우주 황씨); daughter of Hwang Yi-hyeong (황이형; 黃履亨)
  - Son - Gang Suk (강숙; 姜璹)
  - Son - Gang Won (강원; 姜瑗)
  - Son - Gang Chan (강찬; 姜瓚)
  - Daughter - Lady Gang of the Jinju Kang clan (진주 강씨)
  - Daughter - Lady Kang of the Jinju Kang clan (진주 강씨)
  - Daughter - Lady Gang of the Jinju Gang clan (진주 강씨)

== In popular culture ==
- Portrayed by Ahn Dae-yong in the 1995 KBS2 TV Series West Palace
- Portrayed by Jung Hae-Kyun in the 2015 MBC TV Series Splendid politics

== See also ==
- History of Korea
