= Prince Imhae =

Prince of Joseon (1572–1609)

Yi Jin
- Prince of Joseon
- Born: 20 September 1572; Joseon
- Died: 3 June 1609 (aged 36); Gyodong-gun, Gyeonggi Province, Joseon
- Burial: Tomb of Prince Imhae, Songneung-ri, Jingeon-eup, Namyangju, Gyeonggi Province
- Spouse: Princess Consort, of the Yangcheon Heo clan (m. 1585)
- Issue: A daughter Yi Tae-ung; Yi Jun (adoptive); Yi Gyeong (adoptive)
- House: House of Yi
- Father: Seonjo of Joseon
- Mother: Royal Noble Consort Gongbin Kim

Korean name
- Hangul: 이진
- Hanja: 李珒
- RR: I Jin
- MR: I Chin

Royal title
- Hangul: 임해군
- Hanja: 臨海君
- RR: Imhaegun
- MR: Imhaegun

Posthumous name
- Hangul: 정민공
- Hanja: 貞愍公
- RR: Jeongmingong
- MR: Chŏngmin'gong

Childhood name
- Hangul: 이진국
- Hanja: 李鎭國
- RR: I Jinguk
- MR: I Chin'guk

Prince Imhae (Korean: 임해군; Hanja: 臨海君; 20 September 1572 – 3 June 1609; personal name Yi Jin, childhood name Yi Jin-guk), was the eldest son of King Seonjo of Joseon and the elder brother of King Gwanghae. He was known for such a violent and arrogant personality that he murdered some government officials alongside his half brothers, Prince Jeongwon (정원군) and Prince Sunhwa (순화군), but survived punishment thanks to his father's protection.

However, he was passed over for the Crown Prince's role in favour of his younger brother who would eventually take the throne and became King Gwanghae. After being investigated for crimes committed against common people, he was sent into exile to Gyodong County after the Imjin War, then died in 1609.

== Early life and marriage ==
He was born Yi Jin-guk (later changed into Yi Jin) on 20 September 1572 as the first and oldest son of King Seonjo and his concubine, Lady Gim. In 1577 his mother died so he and his younger brother were raised by Seonjo's primary wife, Queen Uiin who was childless at that time.

In 1585 he married the daughter of Heo Myeong (허명), Lady Heo from the Yangcheon Heo clan. In 1591, he, Prince Gwanghae (광해군), Prince Sinseong (신성군), Prince Jeongwon (정원군) and Prince Sunhwa (순화군) became Gwanggigwonjonggongsin (광국원종공신).

== The Imjin war ==
At the start of the Imjin war in 1592, he lost his position as Crown Prince (왕세자; 王世子) due to his violent personality. After being passed over for the position of Crown Prince, he was sent to Hamgyeong-do with Prince Sunhwa (순화군) to recruit the Geunwang soldiers (근왕병).

On 23 July the two brothers were captured by a local inspector in Hoe-ryeong, Hamgyeong-do. They were eventually released after series negotiations.

After the war, prince Imhae acted arrogantly and violently. Some officials wanted him to be severely punished, but he was protected by his father.

When Gwanghae took over the throne, appeals for his punishment and expulsion came up one after another. Uigeumbu (의금부; 義禁府) followed Gwanghae's instructions and punished Imhae, Gi Ja-heon (기자헌) and Yi Heung-ro (이흥로). Meanwhile, Hong Mun-gwan (홍문관) advocated for a death sentence, and Imhae was exiled again to Gyodong-gun. Based on Gwanghaegun's Diary (광해군일기), Yi Jeong-pyo (이정표), a soldier who guarded him in the exile, was suspected to have forced him to drink poison, but after the rebellion, a servant of Imhae testified that he was, in fact, strangled to death. There was also a re-investigation in 1623 which concluded that he was murdered by an assassin sent by Yi Yi-cheom (이이첨), then reinstated under King Injo's command.

== Family ==
- Father: Seonjo of Joseon (조선 선조; 1552–1608)
- Mother: Royal Noble Consort Gong of the Gimhae Gim clan (공빈 김씨; 1553–1577)
- Wife: Princess Consort, of the Yangcheon Heo clan (군부인 양천허씨; 26 July 1571 – 15 October 1644) – daughter of Heo-Myeong (허명).
  1. Unnamed daughter; died prematurely
  2. Yi Tae-ung (이태웅; 1589–1665) – an Iryeon Buddhist (일연스님)
  3. Yi Jun, Prince Changwon (이준 창원군) – adoptive son
  4. Yi Gyeong, Prince Yangnyeong (이경 양녕군; 1616–1644) – adoptive son

== In popular culture ==
=== Television series ===
- Portrayed by Kim Mu-saeng in the 1982 MBC TV Series Woman Exhibition in the West Palace? (여인열전 - 서궁마마).
- Portrayed by Jung Sung-mo in the 1985–1986 MBC TV Series The Imjin War.
- Portrayed by Im Jung-ha in the 1986 MBC TV Series The Hoechun Gate.
- Portrayed by Im Hyuk-joo in the 1995 KBS2 TV Series West Palace.
- Portrayed by Lee Won-bal in the 2000–2001 KBS2 TV Series Roll of Thunder.
- Portrayed by Kim Yu-seok in the 2003–2004 SBS TV Series The King's Woman.
- Portrayed by Lee Kwang-soo and Lee In-sung in the 2013 MBC TV Series Goddess of Fire.
- Portrayed by Park Joo-hyung in the 2014–2015 KBS2 TV series The King's Face.
- Portrayed by Yoon Hong-bin in the 2015 KBS1 TV series The Jingbirok: A Memoir of Imjin War.
- Portrayed by Choi Jong-hwan in the 2015 MBC TV series Splendid Politics.

=== Film ===
- Portrayed by Kim Seung-ho in the 1962 South Korean film Queen Dowager Inmok.
