= West Palace =

1995 South Korean television series

- Also known as: Seogung
- Genre: Historical
- Screenplay by: Park Chan-sung
- Directed by: Kim Jae-hyung
- Creative directors: Shin Chang-suk; Hong Seok-ku; Kim Yoo-chul
- Starring: Lee Young-ae; Kim Kyu-chul; Lee Bo-hee
- Opening theme: "Seogung" by Jeon Mi-kyung
- Country of origin: South Korea
- Original language: Korean
- No. of seasons: 1
- No. of episodes: 52

Production
- Producer: KBS Drama Division
- Running time: 65 minutes

Original release
- Network: KBS2
- Release: July 3 – December 26, 1995

West Palace (Korean: 서궁; Hanja: 西宮; RR: Seogung) is a 1995 South Korean television series starring Lee Young-ae, Kim Kyu-chul and Lee Bo-hee. It aired on KBS2 from July 3 to December 26, 1995, on Mondays and Tuesdays at 21:40 for 52 episodes.

== Synopsis ==
The series is based on the reign of Gwanghaegun of Joseon, a conflict with his stepmother, Queen Inmok and scheming concubine, Kim Gae-shi.

Kim Gae-shi (portrayed by Lee Young-ae) is given Seung-eun (승은) by the Crown Prince Gwanghae (portrayed by Kim Kyu-chul). Although Kim receives seung-eun, she already has a lover, Won-pyo (portrayed by Kim Bo-sung), an excellent swordsman, who enters the palace to stay by her side. However, Won-pyo dies after trying to protect her during the rebellion.

Meanwhile, Queen Inmok (portrayed by Lee Bo-hee) is a virtuous lady that fell victim to palace politics and is subsequently banished to the West Palace along with her children: Princess Jeongmyeong (portrayed by Park Rusia) and Grand Prince Yeongchang (portrayed by Choi Kang-won) after Gwanghaegun is bewitched by his scheming concubine, Kim, whose ambitions and insatiable thirst for power leads to her own downfall.

== Cast ==
=== Main ===
- Lee Young-ae as Court Lady Kim Gae-shi / Gae-dong
  - Lee Jung-hu as young Kim Gae-shi
- Kim Kyu-chul as Yi Hon, Crown Prince Gwanghae, King Gwanghae
- Lee Bo-hee as Queen Dowager Inmok (Soseong)
  - Park So-ra as young Queen Inmok

=== Supporting ===
==== Royal Household ====
- Kim Sung-ok as Yi Yeon, King Seonjo
- Park Jin-hyung as Yi Jong, Prince Neungyang King Injo
- Lee Han-na as Royal Noble Consort In of the Suwon Kim clan
- Jang Seo-hee as Crown Princess Consort Yu, Queen Yoo
- Im Hyuk-joo as Yi Jin, Prince Imhae
- Park Nam-hyun as Yi Je, Prince Heungan
- Choi Kang-won as Yi Ui, Grand Prince Yeongchang
- Park Rusia as Princess Jeongmyeong
- Lee Jae-yun as Yi Bu, Prince Jeongwon, King Wonjong

==== Ministers and nobles ====
- Seo In-seok as Yi I-cheom
- Han In-soo as Kim Je-nam, Queen Inmok's father.
- Ahn Dae-yong as Kang Hong-rip
- Moon Chang-kil as Yoo Geun
- Kim Jong-kyul as Heo Gyun
- Su-hak as Ki Ja-hun
- Shin-goo as Yi Won-ik
- Park-woong as Jung Chul
- Park Chil-yong as Yi San-hae
- Tae Min-yung as Yoo Hee-boon
- Im Byung-ki as Park Seung-jong
- Kim Si-won as Yi Duk-hyung
- Park Yung-mok as Yi Hang-bok
- Lee Jung-woong as Yi Gwi
- Park Seung-kyu as Yi Gwal
- Kim Sung-chan as Kim Ja-jeom
- Kim Chang-bong as Yi Kwang-jung
- Kim Sung-won as Kim Yoo
- Lee Doo-sup as Kim Yook
- Sun Dong-hyuk as Choi Myung-kil
- Lee Han-wi as General Jang Soo
- Yoo Byung-han as Ha-sam
- Choi Dong-joon as Lee Duk-hyung
- Lee Kyung-yung as Park Ja-heung, Crown Prince Gwanghae's relative
- Heo Hyun-ho as Yi Soo, Prince Gwichun
- Kang In-duk as Seo Yang-kap
- Kim Kyung-eung as Shim Woo-yung
- Seo Yung-jin as Park Eung-su
- Ahn Gwang-jin as Park Chi-ui
- Kim Jung-hoon as Im Sook-yung
- Park Kun-shik as Han Hee-kil
- Lee Han-seung as Yun Bang
- Lee Yong-jin as Kwon Pil
- Jo Jae-hoon as Jung Hang
- Jin Woon-sung as Yi Jung-pyo
- Ki Jung-soo as Han Hyo-soon
- Park Yong-shik as Yi Heung-rip
- Heo Jung-kyu as Yi Ahn-jin
- Jang Ki-yong as Kim Kyung-su
- Park Hae-sang as Shin Kyung-jin
- Sun Dong-hyuk as Choi Myung-kil
- Kim Dong-wan as Choi Kwon
- Choi Hun-chul as Uhm Il-goe
- Lee Chun-shik as Choon Bo
- Kim Bo-sung as Won-pyo
  - Jung Tae-woo as young Won-pyo
- Seo Sang-ik as Jeong In-hong
- Park Jung-woong as Eo-ui

==== Palace maids and eunuchs ====
- Kim In-moon as Eunuch Ham
- Lee Jong-man as Eunuch Han
- Kim Eul-dong as Court Lady Uhm
- Jang Jung-hee as Court Lady Ji
- Kim Min-hee as Maid Eum-duk

==== Other families ====
- Yang Geum-seok as Lady Kang, Kim Gae-shi's mother.
- Uhm Yoo-shin as Lady No, Kim Je-nam's wife.
- Park Joon-geum as Lady Lee, Lee Yi-cheom's wife.
- Kim Young-ok as Lady Ryu, Lee Yi-cheom's mother.
- Ko Hee-joon as Won-pyo's adoptive father.

=== Extended cast ===
- Park Byung-ho as a missionary ambassador
- Park Yong-gi as a Buddhist monk
- Lee Hyo-jung
- Seo Yung-ae
- Moon Su-in
- Yoo Byung-hwan
- Kwon Oh-hyun

== Production ==
1. It was Lee Young-ae and Choi Dong-joon first appearance in a historical drama.
2. The series emphasized Kim Gae-shi's role as Gwanghae's concubine so the production team added a fictional character, Won-pyo, who is Lady Kim's lover, to promote a love conflict.
