= Chŏng Ch'ŏl =

Korean scholar-official (1536–1594)

Chŏng Ch'ŏl 정철
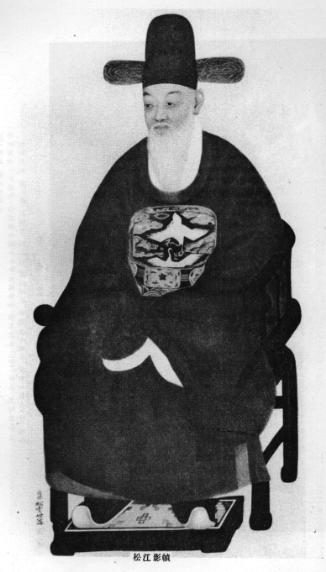

Left State Councillor
- In office 13 March 1590 – 24 February 1591
- Preceded by: Yi Sanhae
- Succeeded by: Yu Sŏngnyong

Right State Councillor
- In office 8 December 1589 – March 1590
- Preceded by: Chŏng Ŏnsin
- Succeeded by: Sim Sugyŏng

Personal details
- Born: December 18, 1536
- Died: February 7, 1594 (aged 57)

Korean name
- Hangul: 정철
- Hanja: 鄭澈
- RR: Jeong Cheol
- MR: Chŏng Ch'ŏl

Chŏng Ch'ŏl (Korean: 정철; Hanja: 鄭澈; December 18, 1536 – February 7, 1594) was a Korean statesman and poet. He used the pen-names Kyeham (계함) and Songgang (송강), and studied under Kim Yunjae at Hwanbyeokdang. He was expelled by the Easterners. He was from the Yeonil Chŏng clan (연일 정씨; 延日 鄭氏).

== Family ==
- Father
  - Chŏng Yuch'im (정유침; 鄭惟沈; 1493–1570)
- Mother
  - Lady An of the Juksan An clan (죽산 안씨; 竹山 安氏; 1495–1573)
- Siblings
  - Older brother - Chŏng Cha (정자; 鄭滋; 1515–1547)
  - Older brother - Chŏng So (정소; 鄭沼; 1518–1572)
  - Older sister - Royal Consort Gwi-in of the Yeonil Chŏng clan (귀인 정씨; August 1520 – March 25, 1566)
    - Brother-in-law - King Injong of Joseon (조선 인종; March 10, 1515 – August 7, 1545)
  - Older sister - Lady Chŏng of the Yeonil Chŏng clan (연일 정씨; 1521–1596)
  - Older brother - Chŏng Hwang (정황; 鄭滉; 1528–1588)
  - Younger sister - Princess Consort Och'ŏn of the Yeonil Chŏng clan (오천군부인 연일 정씨; 烏川郡夫人 延日 鄭氏; 1542–?)
- Wives and their children
  - Lady Yu of the Munhwa Yu clan (문화 유씨; 文化 柳氏; 1535–1598)
    - Daughter - Lady Chŏng of the Yeonil Chŏng clan (연일 정씨; 1556)
    - Son - Chŏng Kimyŏng (정기명; 鄭振溟; 1558–1589)
    - Lady Chŏng of the Yeonil Chŏng clan (연일 정씨; 1559–?)
    - Son - Chŏng Chongmyŏng (정종명; 鄭宗溟; 1565–1626)
    - Son - Chŏng Chinmyŏng (정진명; 鄭振溟; 1567–1614)
    - Daughter - Lady Chŏng of the Yeonil Chŏng clan (연일 정씨; 1576–?)
    - Son - Chŏng Hong-myŏng (정홍명; 鄭弘溟; March 7, 1582 – October 2, 1650)
  - Concubine - Chinok (기녀 진옥; 眞玉)
  - Concubine - Lady Kang'a(강아; 江娥)

== Literary works ==
He is prominent in the gasa and the sijo, which are forms of classical Korean poetry.

The following two poems are an exchange between Chŏng Ch'ŏl and the gisaeng Chinok. Chŏng is playing on Chinok's name, which means Genuine Gem. First he calls her a gem (ok; 玉), then suggests she is an imitation (pŏn-ok; 燔玉) and finally finds her to be genuine (chin-ok; 眞玉).

옥(玉)이 옥(玉)이라 커늘 번옥(燔玉)으로 여겼더니
이제야 보아하니 진옥(眞玉)일시 분명하다
나에게 살 송곳 있으니 뚫어볼까 하노라

Translation:

Gem, oh, they talk of a gem
but I thought it an imitation.
Now I know for certain
it is a genuine gem.
My thrusting gimlet
will carry you with me.
- Chŏng Ch'ŏl to Chinok

Chinok replies by playing on the name of Chŏng Ch'ŏl (鄭澈), first calling him iron (ch'ŏl; 鐵), then suggesting he might be false iron (sŏp-ch'ŏl; 攝鐵) and finally discovering he is genuine iron (chŏng ch'ŏl; 正鐵). Unquestionably bawdy, this exchange is one of the finest examples of satire in sijo — a poetic form that placed high value on wit, double entendre and word play.

철(鐵)이 철(鐵)이라커늘 섭철(攝鐵)로만 여겼더니
이제야 보아하니 정철(正鐵)일시 분명하다
나에게 골풀무 있으니 녹여볼까 하노라

Translation:

Iron, oh, they talk of iron
but I thought it false.
Now I know for certain
it is true iron.
My pair of bellows
will smelt it.
- Chinok to Chŏng Ch'ŏl

Other Works:

- Gwandong Byeolgok (The Song of the Sceneries of the Gwandong).
- Samiingok (Mindful of My Seemly Lord).
- Songgang Gasa (Songgang's Prose Poetry Book).

== Popular culture ==
- Portrayed by Park-woong in the 1995 KBS2 TV Series West Palace.
- Portrayed by Joo Jin-mo in the 2014 KBS2 TV series The King's Face.
- Portrayed by Sun Dong-Hyuk in the 2015 KBS2 TV series The Jingbirok: A Memoir of Imjin War.

== Legacy ==
- A crater on Mercury was named after him in 1979.

== See also ==
- Korean literature
- Joseon dynasty
