= Gwangju No clan =

Korean clan from Gyeonggi Province

- Country: Korea
- Current region: Gwangju, Gyeonggi
- Founder: No Pil sang

Gwangju No clan (Korean: 광주 노씨; Hanja: 廣州 魯氏) was one of the Korean clans. Their Bon-gwan was in Gwangju, Gyeonggi Province. According to the research in 2000, the number of Gwangju No clan was 15158. Lu’s surname was Chinese origin, and the surname came from the fact that Bo Qin was appointed as Lu and called himself as Lu. Lu Zhonglian founded Gija Joseon with Gija when Lu Zhonglian conquered Korea. No Pil sang, a descendant of Lu Zhonglian, began Gwangju No clan after No Pil sang served as a Dafu (Hanja: 大夫) during Joseon, and No Pil sang’s descendant was settled in Gwangju.

== See also ==
- Korean clan names of foreign origin
