= The King's Face =

- Promotional poster
- Genre: Historical period drama Romance; Political
- Written by: Lee Hyang-hee; Yoon Soo-jung
- Directed by: Yoon Sung-sik; Cha Young-hoon
- Starring: Seo In-guk; Jo Yoon-hee; Lee Sung-jae; Kim Gyu-ri; Shin Sung-rok
- Country of origin: South Korea
- Original language: Korean
- No. of seasons: 1
- No. of episodes: 23

Production
- Executive producer: Jung Hae-ryong
- Producers: Hwang In-hyuk; Park Woo-ram
- Production location: South Korea
- Running time: Wednesdays and Thursdays at 21:55 (KST)
- Production companies: The King's Face Culture Industry Co., Ltd. KBS Media

Original release
- Network: Korean Broadcasting System
- Release: November 19, 2014 – February 5, 2015

The King's Face (Korean: 왕의 얼굴; Hanja: 王의 얼굴; RR: Wangui eolgul) is a 2014 South Korean television series starring Seo In-guk, Jo Yoon-hee, Lee Sung-jae, Kim Gyu-ri and Shin Sung-rok. It aired on KBS2 from November 19, 2014, to February 5, 2015, on Wednesdays and Thursdays at 21:55 for 23 episodes.

== Plot ==
Gwanghae, the child of a concubine, becomes the Crown Prince of Joseon. For the next 16 years, the illegitimate prince lives through turbulent times, enduring death threats and possible dethronement. Gwanghae has a contentious relationship with his father King Seonjo, and the two eventually become rivals in politics and love. Using physiognomy as a weapon and means to gain power, Gwanghae enlists a face-reading fortuneteller to help him become the next King.

== Cast ==
- Seo In-guk as Prince Gwanghae
- Jo Yoon-hee as Kim Ga-hee
  - Jeon Min-seo as young Kim Ga-hee
- Lee Sung-jae as King Seonjo
- Kim Gyu-ri as Lady Gwi-in of the Kim clan
- Shin Sung-rok as Kim Do-chi
- Go Won-hee as Queen Inmok
- Im Ji-eun as Queen Uiin
- Kim Hee-jung as Deposed Queen Yu
- Choi Seung-hoon as Deposed Crown Prince Yi Ji
- Park Joo-hyung as Prince Imhae
- Yoon Bong-gil as Im Young-shin
- Im Ji-kyu as Heo Gyun
- Jo Won-hee as Kim Du-seo
- Kim Hyun-sook as Lady Park
- Ahn Suk-hwan as Yi San-hae
- Song Min-hyung as Yoo Seung
- Lee Chung as Yoo Ja-shin
- Kim Bang-won as Kang Jin-yeol
- Ji Seo-yoon as Hong Sook-yong
- Won Deok-hyun as Prince Sinseong
- Seo Hyunseok as Prince Jeongwon
  - Park Joon-mok as young Prince Jeongwon
- Joo Jin-mo as Jeong Cheol
- Lee Byung-joon as Kim Gong-ryang
- Min Song-ah as Court Lady Park
- Lee Soon-jae as Baek Kyung
- Kim Myung-gon as Eunuch Song
- Lee Ki-young as Go San
- Choi Cheol-ho as Jeong Yeo-rip
- Yoon Jin-ho as Seo Yong
- Lee Sang-in as Jin Young
- Im Soo-hyun as Song Wol
- Park Jae-min as Bong Du
- Choi Kang-won as Oh Gil
- Jung Moon-yup as Sam Gil
- Oh Eun-ho as Court lady Oh
- Go In-beom as Jang Soo-tae
- Baek Jae-jin as Mu Cheol
- Yoon Bit-na as Kyung San
- Kim Yeol as Kap-yi
- Kim Seo-jung as Yeon-joo

== Awards and nominations ==
Year	Award	Category	Recipient	Result
2014	KBS Drama Awards	Excellence Award, Actor in a Mid-length Drama	Seo In-guk	Nominated
2014	KBS Drama Awards	Excellence Award, Actress in a Mid-length Drama	Jo Yoon-hee	Nominated
2014	KBS Drama Awards	Best Supporting Actor	Shin Sung-rok	Won
2014	KBS Drama Awards	Best New Actor	Seo In-guk	Won

== Plagiarism controversy ==
On August 25, 2014, Jupiter Film, the production company of the 2013 film The Face Reader, filed for an injunction in court for infringement of copyright and unfair competition against KBS, asking that the network not be allowed to air their unauthorized remake. According to Jupiter Film, they own the rights to the original script for The Face Reader with a "one source multi use" clause, for the express purpose of producing a film, a book series, and a television series based on the story about a face-reading fortuneteller who gets caught up in a political battle for the throne. The film sold 9 million tickets in 2013, and two books in the series (backstories for the characters in the film) have been released thus far. Jupiter Film said they approached KBS Media in 2012 about a 24-episode TV drama adaptation of The Face Reader and handed over scripts and outlines, and mentioned War of Money screenwriter Lee Hyang-hee as a good candidate for penning the remake. But KBS Media and Jupiter Film could not agree on terms and negotiations fell through. Jupiter Film alleged that after KBS Media backed out of the deal, the latter took the idea and made their own version, including hiring the screenwriter they'd suggested.

KBS in turn issued the following statement: "The King's Face is a totally different drama in people, era, and setting, with different plot and conflict structure, and mode of expression from The Face Reader." While waiting for the court's final decision, KBS decided to go ahead with the production and made casting announcements. The court ruling in November 2014 was in KBS's favor, stating that there was no plagiarism involved.

== International broadcast ==
- Myanmar – MRTV-4 (2015)
- Indonesia - RTV (April 23, 2016)
- Thailand – Channel 3 (January 10, 2017)
