= Seonjo of Joseon =

King of Joseon from 1567 to 1608

Seonjo
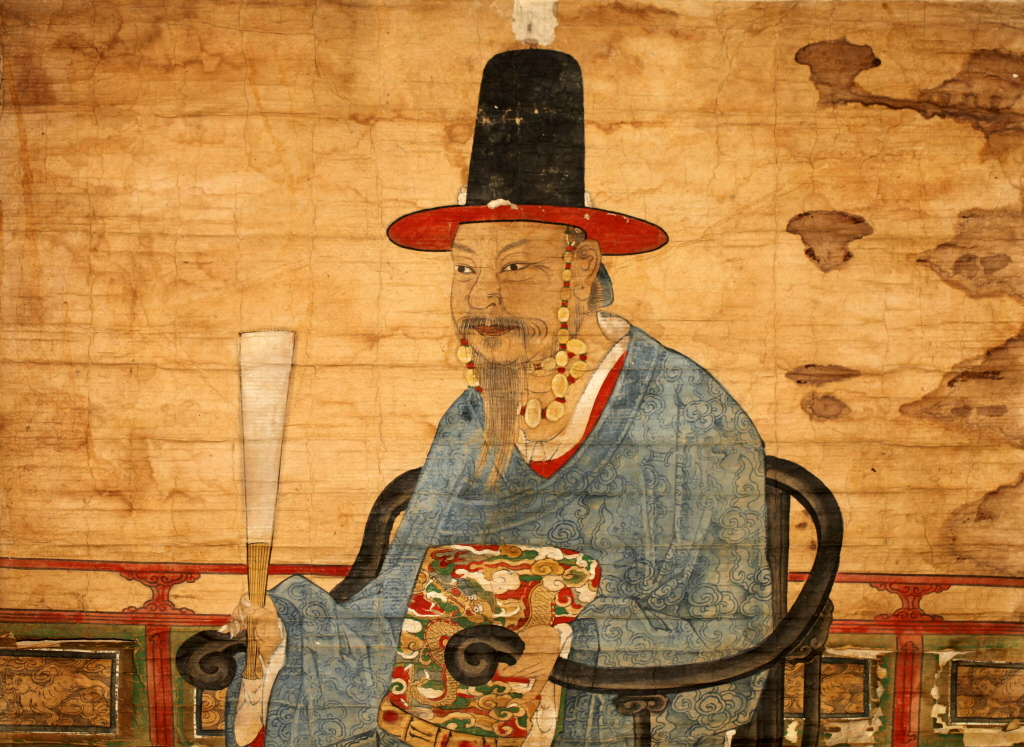
- Portrait traditionally attributed to be of King Seonjo

King of Joseon
- Reign: 12 August 1567 – 16 March 1608
- Enthronement: 17 August 1567; Geunjeongjeon, Gyeongbokgung
- Predecessor: Myeongjong
- Successor: Gwanghaegun
- Regent: Queen Dowager Uiseong (1567–1568)
- Born: Yi Gyun (이균; 李鈞); 6 December 1552; Dojeonggung, (Note: Korean: 도정궁; Hanja: 都正宮; the residence of Prince Deokheung.) Indal-bang, Hanseong, Joseon
- Died: 16 March 1608 (aged 55); Haenggung, (Note: Korean: 행궁; Hanja: 行宮; lit. ''Temporary Palace''; also known as "Jeongneung-dong Haenggung" (정릉동 행궁; 貞陵洞 行宮).) Hanseong, Joseon
- Burial: Mongneung, Donggureung Cluster, Guri, South Korea
- Spouses: Queen Uiin (m. 1569; died 1600) Queen Inmok (m. 1602)
- Issue Detail: Prince Imhae; Gwanghaegun of Joseon; Prince Jeongwon; Prince Sunhwa; Princess Jeongseon; Princess Jeongmyeong; Grand Prince Yeongchang
Names
- Yi Yeon (이연; 李昖)
Era dates
- Adopted the era name of the Ming dynasty (Note: Yunggyeong (Longqing) (융경; 隆慶): 1567–1572 Mallyeok (Wanli) (만력; 萬曆): 1572–1608)
Regnal name
- Jeongryun Ibgeuk Seongdeok Hongryeol Jiseong Daeui Gyeokcheon Heeun Gyeongmyeong Sinryeok Honggong Yungeob (정륜입극성덕홍렬지성대의격천희운경명신력홍공융업; 正倫立極盛德洪烈至誠大義格天熙運景命神曆弘功隆業) (Note: Known as honorific name (존호; 尊號) in the Sinosphere, its closest equivalent in the English-speaking world is the regnal name.)
Posthumous name
- Joseon: Great King Sogyeong Hyeonmun Uimu Seongye Dalhyo (소경현문의무성예달효대왕; 昭敬顯文毅武聖睿達孝大王); Ming dynasty: Sogyeong (소경; 昭敬)
Temple name
- Seonjong (선종; 宣宗) → Seonjo (선조; 宣祖) (Note: Conferred in 1608 and 1616, respectively.)
- Clan: Jeonju Yi
- Dynasty: Yi
- Father: Grand Internal Prince Deokheung (biological); King Myeongjong (adoptive)
- Mother: Grand Internal Princess Consort Hadong (biological); Queen Insun (adoptive)
- Religion: Confucianism (Neo-Confucianism)

Korean name
- Hangul: 선조
- Hanja: 宣祖
- Lit.: "Radiant Progenitor"
- RR: Seonjo
- MR: Sŏnjo

Royal title
- Hangul: 하성군
- Hanja: 河城君
- RR: Haseonggun
- MR: Hasŏnggun

Seonjo (Korean: 선조; Hanja: 宣祖; 6 December 1552 – 16 March 1608), (Note: In the Korean calendar (lunisolar), he was born on the 11th day of the 11th lunar month and died on the 1st day of the 2nd lunar month.) personal name Yi Gyun, later changed to Yi Yeon, was the 14th monarch of Joseon. The youngest son of Prince Deokheung and a grandson of King Jungjong, he acceded to the throne at the age of 14, upon the death of his uncle, King Myeongjong. At the beginning of his reign, he promoted Confucianism and attempted reforms. However, he later gained infamy due to the political discord and incompetent leadership during the Imjin War.

== Biography ==
=== Early life ===
King Seonjo was born Yi Yeon in 1552 in Hanseong (today, Seoul), capital of Korea, as the third son of Prince Deokheung (덕흥군), himself son of King Jungjong and Royal Noble Consort Chang of the Ansan An clan (창빈 안씨).

He was given the title of Prince Haseong, and was eventually adopted by Queen Insun. When King Myeongjong died young without an heir, Prince Haseong was the next in the line of succession. Then, by decision of the royal court, he was crowned king in 1567 at the age of 16. His father had the status of Grand Internal Prince (대원군, Daewongun, 'Great Prince of the Court).

=== Beginning of reign (1567–1575) ===
According to imperial sources, King Seonjo focused on improving the lives of the common people and rebuilding the nation after the political corruption of the chaotic reigns of kings Yeonsangun and Jungjong. He encouraged the Sarim scholars, who had been persecuted by the entrenched aristocracy in four literati purges between 1498 and 1545, during the reigns of Yeonsangun and Jungjong. Seonjo continued the political reforms of King Myeongjong and appointed many renowned Confucian scholars, including Yi Hwang, Yi I, Chŏng Ch'ŏl, and Yu Sŏngnyong, to office.

Seonjo also reformed the civil service examination system, particularly the civil official qualification exam. The previous exam was primarily concerned with literature rather than politics or history. The king himself ordered the system to be reformed by increasing the importance of these other subjects. He also restored the reputations of executed scholars such as Cho Kwangjo, who died in the 1519 literati purge, and denounced the accomplishments of corrupt aristocrats, notably Nam Kon, who instigated the purge under Jungjong and contributed greatly to the corruption of the era. These acts earned the king the respect of the general populace, and the country enjoyed a brief era of peace.

=== Political division and East-West feud (1575–1592) ===
Among the scholars, King Seonjo called to the government were Shim Eui-gyeom and Kim Hyowŏn. Shim was a relative of the queen and heavily conservative. Kim was the leading figure of the new generation of officials and called for liberal reforms. The scholars who supported King Seonjo began to split into two factions, headed by Shim and Kim. Members of the two factions even lived in the same neighbourhood; Sim's faction lived on the west side of the city while Kim's followers gathered on the east side. Consequently, the two factions came to be known as the Westerners and the Easterners; this two-faction political system lasted 200 years and later contributed to the state's collapse.

Initially, the Westerners earned the king's favour because Shim was related to the queen and enjoyed greater support from wealthy nobles. However, their attitudes on reformation and Shim's indecisiveness helped the Easterners take power, and the Westerners fell out of favor. Reforms were accelerated during the first period of Eastern influence, but many Easterners then urged others to slow the reforms. The Easterners divided further into Northern and Southern factions. Yu Sŏngnyong led the Southern faction while the Northerners divided even further after arguments over many issues; the greater Northern faction came to become extremely liberal in the scope of their reform goals, while the "lesser" Northern faction was less reformist but still more open to reform than the Southerners.

When Hideyoshi unified Japan in 1592, many Koreans began to fear that their country would be conquered and annexed. Many officials concerned with the kingdom's defence urged the king to send delegates to Hideyoshi, with the primary purpose of determining whether he was preparing an invasion. However, the two political factions disagreed on this, so one delegate from each faction was sent to Japan. When they returned to Korea, their reports only caused more controversy and confusion. Hwang Yun-gil, a Westerner, reported that Hideyoshi was raising huge numbers of troops, but Kim Sŏngil, an Easterner, told the king that he thought these large forces were not for the war against Korea since Toyotomi Hideyoshi was trying to complete his reforms quickly to prevent lawlessness and quash the bandits now roaming the countryside.

Since the Easterners had the bigger voice in government at the time, Hwang's reports were ignored and Seonjo decided not to prepare for war, even though the attitude of Hideyoshi in his letter to Seonjo clearly showed his interest in the conquest of Asia.

The factional infighting of the Joseon court, combined with the 1589 rebellion of Chŏng Yŏrip that led to the purge of more than 1,000 scholars affiliated with the Eastern faction, led to Joseon's military unpreparedness. Political divisions weakened the nation, as the size of the military was a key issue on the reform agenda. Yi I, a neutral conservative, urged the king to increase the size of the army to prepare against future invasions from Jurchen groups and the Ashikaga shogunate of Japan. However, both factions rejected Yi's suggestions, and the army's size was further reduced, as many believed the peaceful period would last. The Jurchens and Japanese used this opportunity to expand their influence in East Asia, resulting in repeated invasions by Toyotomi Hideyoshi's forces known as the Imjin War.

=== Imjin War (1592–1598) ===
In 1591, after the delegates had returned from Japan, Toyotomi Hideyoshi sent his own delegates to visit King Seonjo, and asked permission to pass through the Korean Peninsula to invade China, in effect declaring war against the Joseon kingdom. The king was surprised; after refusing the Japanese request he sent a letter to Beijing to alert the Chinese that the Japanese were actually preparing for full-scale war against the Korean-Chinese alliance. He also ordered the construction of many forts in the coastal regions and sent generals Sin Rip and Yi Il to the southern coast to prepare for war. While the Koreans were busy making their preparations, the Japanese manufactured muskets for many of their soldiers, mobilized warriors from across the entire country.

On May 23, 1592, 700 Japanese ships carrying 18,700 troops under Konishi Yukinaga invaded Korea. Konishi burned Fort Busan and Fort Dongnae, killed commanders Chŏng Pal and Song Sanghyŏn and marched northward to Hanyang. On the next day, Katō Kiyomasa and Kuroda Nagamasa with 22,800 and 11,000 troops respectively landed, also marching toward Hanyang. The Japanese fleet under Todo Takatora and Kuki Yoshitaka supported them from the sea. General Yi Il faced Katō Kiyomasa at the Battle of Sangju, which was won by the Japanese. Yi Il met up with General Sin Rip and engaged Konishi's troops at the Battle of Chungju, but were defeated. Then Seonjo appointed General Kim Myeong-won as Commander-in-Chief and Field Marshal, and ordered him to defend the capital and moved to Pyongyang as the Japanese began encroaching upon the city. He later moved even further north to the border city of Uiju just before the fall of Pyongyang. While the king was absent from the capital, many people who had lost hope in the government plundered the palace and burned many public buildings, including the Gyeongbokgung. During Seonjo's stay at Uiju, he wrote the Joseon government's first public document written solely in Hangul, rather than Hanja. Historians believe that the king deliberately chose Hangul to ensure commoners could understand the message and to prevent the Japanese from understanding it.

Although the army continued to lose men and battles, the navy under Admiral Yi Sun-sin defeated the Japanese fleet several times and did much damage to the supply ships. With the navy blocking supplies, Ming forces arrived at the request of Seonjo and began to push the Japanese southward, eventually retaking Pyongyang. Konishi Yukinaga successfully blocked a Chinese advance at Battle of Byeokjegwan, and again tried to push the Koreans northward, but the crucial blow came at the Battle of Hangju, where General Gwon Yul defeated the Japanese with a much smaller force. The Japanese then decided to enter into peace negotiations, while both sides continued fighting. A month before he returned to Hanyang, Seonjo wrote an edict in Hangeul where anyone that either captured Japanese forces in battle, reported on invading troop movements, or rescued Korean prisoners would receive the title of government official regardless of class. During these negotiations Korean forces retook Hanseong, but the palaces had all been burnt to the ground, so Seonjo repaired one of the old royal family's houses and renamed it to Deoksugung, making it one of the official palaces.

The peace negotiations between the Chinese and Japanese ended unsuccessfully, due to disagreements between the two sides and misrepresentation of the Koreans. The Japanese again invaded Korea in 1597; but this time all three nations were ready for war, and the Japanese were not able to advance as easily as in 1592. The Japanese tried to take Hanyang from both land and sea routes. At first the plan seemed to work well when Todo Takatora defeated Admiral Wŏn Kyun at the Battle of Chilchonryang, but it was eventually thwarted when the Korean navy under Admiral Yi Sun-sin defeated the Japanese fleet under Todo Takatora in the Battle of Myeongnyang with only 13 ships. After the sudden death of Toyotomi Hideyoshi in 1598, the Japanese completely withdrew from Korea in 1598. The ensuing Battle of Noryang marked the end of the war, with the last Japanese units under Konishi Yukinaga leaving Korea.

=== Later days (1598–1608) ===
Despite all the efforts put in by Seonjo during the war, such as establishing army training facilities and reforming taxation laws – which awarded people with increase of social class, exemption of labor or crimes in return for payment of tax in rice – the war left a devastated land and starving people. After the war, his wish of reconstructing the nation was impeded by the political turmoil caused by quarrelling political factions and famine. His Crown Prince Gwanghaegun aided him in his ruling of the country. However, when the queen gave birth to Grand Prince Yeongchang (Gwanghaegun was the second son of Lady Kim, the king's concubine), the succession also became a matter of contention. King Seonjo died in 1608.

== Family ==
- Biological father: Grand Internal Prince Deokheung (덕흥대원군; 2 April 1530 – 14 June 1559)
  - Grandfather: King Jungjong (중종대왕; 25 April 1488 – 9 December 1544)
  - Biological grandmother: Concubine Chang (창빈), of the Ansan An clan (안산 안씨; 11 September 1499 – 17 November 1549)
  - Legal grandmother: Queen Munjeong (문정왕후), of the Papyeong Yun clan (파평 윤씨; 12 December 1501 – 15 May 1565)
- Adoptive father: King Myeongjong (명종대왕; 13 July 1532 – 12 August 1567)
- Biological mother: Grand Internal Princess Consort Hadong (하동부대부인), of the Hadong Jeong clan (하동 정씨; 24 September 1530 – 24 June 1567)
  - Grandfather: Jeong Se-ho (정세호; 1486–1563)
  - Grandmother: Lady, of the Gwangju Yi clan (광주 이씨)
- Adoptive mother: Queen Insun (인순왕후), of the Cheongsong Shim clan (청송 심씨; 7 July 1532 – 22 February 1575)

Consort(s) and their respective issue

- Queen Uiin (의인왕후), of the Bannam Park clan (반남 박씨; 15 May 1555 – 26 July 1600)
- Queen Inmok (인목왕후), of the Yonan Kim clan (연안 김씨; 15 December 1584 – 13 August 1632)
  - Princess Jeongmyeong (정명공주; 27 June 1603 – 8 September 1685), 10th daughter
  - Unnamed daughter (1604)
  - Yi Ui (이의), Grand Prince Yeongchang (영창대군; 12 April 1606 – 19 March 1614), 13th son
- Concubine Gong (공빈), of the Gimhae Kim clan (김해 김씨; 26 November 1553 – 23 June 1577)
  - Yi Jin (이진), Prince Imhae (임해군; 20 September 1572 – 2 June 1609), first son
  - Yi Hon (이혼), Gwanghaegun (광해군; 14 June 1575 – 7 August 1641), second son
- Concubine In (인빈), of the Suwon Kim clan (수원 김씨; 31 March 1555 – 30 November 1613)
  - Yi Seong (이성), Prince Uian (의안군; 20 August 1577 – 20 March 1588), third son
  - Yi Hu (이후), Prince Sinseong (신성군; 6 January 1579 – 8 December 1592), fourth son
  - Yi Bu (이부), Prince Jeongwon (정원군; 12 August 1580 – 23 January 1620), fifth son
  - Princess Jeongsin (정신옹주; 18 August 1582 – 13 March 1653), first daughter
  - Princess Jeonghye (정혜옹주; 2 May 1584 – 22 December 1638), second daughter
  - Princess Jeongsuk (정숙옹주; 26 April 1587 – 12 December 1627), third daughter
  - Yi Gwang (이광), Prince Uichang (의창군; 1589 – 2 December 1645), eighth son
  - Princess Jeongan (정안옹주; 1590 – 27 September 1660), fifth daughter
  - Princess Jeonghwi (정휘옹주; 7 August 1593 – 6 September 1653), sixth daughter
- Concubine Sun (순빈), of the Gimhae Kim clan (김해 김씨; ?–1647)
  - Yi Po (이보), Prince Sunhwa (순화군; 16 November 1580 – 14 April 1607), sixth son
- Concubine Jeong (정빈), of the Yeoheung Min clan (여흥 민씨; 30 October 1567 – 20 December 1626)
  - Yi Gong (이공), Prince Inseong (인성군; 17 December 1588 – 21 June 1628), seventh son
  - Princess Jeongin (정인옹주; 1590 – 4 February 1656), fourth daughter
  - Princess Jeongseon (정선옹주; 20 May 1594 – 4 September 1674), seventh daughter
  - Princess Jeonggeun (정근옹주; 1599 – 26 August 1613), ninth daughter
  - Yi Yeong (이영), Prince Inheung (인흥군; 7 March 1604 – 6 January 1652), 12th son
- Concubine Jeong (정빈), of the Namyang Hong clan (남양 홍씨; 25 August 1563 – 4 April 1638)
  - Princess Jeongjeong (정정옹주; 15 February 1595 – 3 October 1666), eighth daughter
  - Yi Ju (이주), Prince Gyeongchang (경창군; 12 November 1596 – 23 February 1654), ninth son
- Concubine On (온빈), of the Cheongju Han clan (청주 한씨; 12 November 1581 – 30 November 1664)
  - Yi Je (이제), Prince Heungan (흥안군; 1598 – 3 April 1624), 10th son
  - Yi Neuk (이륵), Prince Gyeongpyeong (경평군; 27 July 1600 – 4 January 1674), 11th son
  - Princess Jeonghwa (정화옹주; 1604–1667), 11th daughter
  - Yi Gye (이계), Prince Yeongseon (영선군; 21 January 1607 – 24 October 1649), 14th son
- Gwiin (귀인), of the Yeonil Jeong clan (연일 정씨; 6 November 1557 – 1 June 1579)
- Sugui (숙의), of the Dongnae Jeong clan (동래 정씨; 1564–1580)
- Sugui (숙의), of the Kim clan (김씨)
- Sugui (숙의), of the Han clan (한씨)
- Sowon (소원), of the Yun clan (윤씨; ?–1632) (Note: Stripped of her rank and executed.)
- Palace Lady (상궁), of the Kim clan (김씨; 1584–1623), given name Gae-si (개시) (Note: Sanggung (상궁; 尚宫); female official of the senior fifth rank in the internal court.)
- Palace Lady (상궁), of the Park clan (박씨)
- Unknown
  - Unnamed daughter (1596–1601)
  - Unnamed son (?–1603)
  - Unnamed daughter (?–1603)

== Ancestry ==
Ancestors of Seonjo of Joseon

King Deokjong (덕종대왕)
King Seongjong (성종대왕)
Queen Sohye, of the Cheongju Han clan (소혜왕후 청주 한씨)
King Jungjong (중종대왕)
Yun Ho, Internal Prince Yeongwon (영원부원군 윤호)
Queen Jeonghyeon, of the Papyeong Yun clan (정현왕후 파평 윤씨)
Princess Consort Yeonan, of the Damyang Jeon clan (연안부부인 담양 전씨)
Grand Internal Prince Deokheung (덕흥대원군)
An Tan-dae (안탄대)
Concubine Chang, of the Ansan An clan (창빈 안산 안씨)
Lady, of the Hwang clan (황씨)
King Seonjo
Jeong In-ji (정인지)
Jeong Sang-jo (정상조)
Lady, of the Gyeongju Yi clan (경주 이씨)
Jeong Se-ho (정세호)
An On-cheon (안온천)
Lady, of the Juksan An clan (죽산 안씨)
Lady, of the Jeonju Yi clan (전주 이씨)
Grand Internal Princess Consort Hadong, of the Hadong Jeong clan (하동부대부인 하동 정씨)
Lady, of the Gwangju Yi clan (광주 이씨)

== In popular culture ==
- Portrayed by Kim Sung-ok in the 1995 KBS2 TV series West Palace.
- Portrayed by Park Chan-hwan in the 1999–2000 MBC TV series Hur Jun.
- Portrayed by Im Dong-jin in the 2003 SBS The King's Woman.
- Portrayed by Choi Cheol-ho in the 2004–2005 KBS1 TV series Immortal Admiral Yi Sun-sin.
- Portrayed by Kim Chang-wan in the 2010 film Blades of Blood.
- Portrayed by Jeon No-min in the 2013 MBC TV series Hur Jun, The Original Story.
- Portrayed by Jeong Bo-seok in the 2013 MBC TV series Goddess of Fire.
- Portrayed by Lee Sung-jae in the 2014 KBS2 TV series The King's Face.
- Portrayed by Kim Tae-woo in the 2015 KBS1 TV series The Jingbirok: A Memoir of Imjin War.
- Portrayed by Park Yeong-gyu in the 2015 MBC TV series Splendid Politics.
- Portrayed by Lee Ji-hoon in the 2016 JTBC TV series Mirror of the Witch.
- Portrayed by Kim Hyun-bin in the 2016 MBC TV series Flowers of the Prison.
- Portrayed by Jang Hyuk in the 2019 tvN TV Series The Crowned Clown.
- Portrayed by Cha Seung-won in the 2024 film Uprising.

== See also ==
- History of Korea
- List of monarchs of Korea
- Styles and titles in Joseon

== Notes ==
Seonjo of Joseon House of Yi Born: 6 December 1552 Died: 16 March 1608
Royal titles
Preceded by Myeongjong	King of Joseon; 12 August 1567 – 16 March 1608	Succeeded by Gwanghaegun
