= Northerners (Korean political faction) =

Political faction in Joseon

- Split from: Easterners
- Succeeded by: Greater Northerners, Lesser Northerners

- Korean name
- Hangul: 북인
- Hanja: 北人
- RR: Bugin
- MR: Pugin

The Northerners (Korean: 북인; Hanja: 北人; lit. ''North people'') were a political faction of the Joseon period of dynastic Korea. It was created after the 1591 split from the Easterners of Yi San-hae and his supporters. In 1606, during the final years of King Seonjo's reign, the Northerners divided into the Greater Northerners (대북; led by Heo Gyun) and the Lesser Northerners (소북). In 1613, the Greater Northerners split further into Flesh Northerners (육북), Bone Northerners (골북), and Middle Northerners (중북). The Lesser Northerners also split further into Pure Lesser Northerners (청소북) and Impure Lesser Southerners (탁소북).

== Members ==
- Yi San-hae
- Jeong In-hong
- Nam I-gong
- Yi I-cheom
