= Hadong Budaebuin =

Korean princess consort (1530–1567)

- Born: 24 September 1530; Joseon
- Died: 24 June 1567 (aged 36); Dojeonggung, (Note: Korean: 도정궁; Hanja: 都正宮; the residence of Prince Deokheung.) Indal-bang, Hanseong, Joseon
- Burial: Deokheungdaewongunmyo, Namyangju, South Korea
- Spouse: Grand Internal Prince Deokheung (died 1559)
- Issue Detail: 3 sons, 1 daughter
- Clan: Hadong Jeong (by birth); Jeonju Yi (by marriage)
- Dynasty: Yi
- Father: Jeong Se-ho
- Mother: Lady, of the Gwangju Yi clan

Korean name
- Hangul: 하동부대부인
- Hanja: 河東府大夫人
- RR: Hadong budaebuin
- MR: Hadong pudaebuin

Grand Internal Princess Consort Hadong (Korean: 하동부대부인; Hanja: 河東府大夫人; 24 September 1530 – 24 June 1567), or Hadong Budaebuin, of the Hadong Jeong clan, was the wife of Grand Internal Prince Deokheung and the biological mother of King Seonjo, the 14th monarch of Joseon.

== Biography ==
=== Early life and lineage ===
Lady Jeong was born during the reign of King Jungjong, as the younger child among one son and one daughter. Her father was Jeong Se-ho (정세호) and her mother was a lady from the Gwangju Yi clan (광주 이씨).

On her paternal side, she was a great-granddaughter of Jeong In-ji and a second cousin twice removed of the Deposed Queen Yu, as well as a descendant of King Sejong and Queen Soheon via their second daughter, Princess Jeongui (정의공주), and a descendant of Grand Prince Hyoryeong via his grandson, Yi Chu (이추; eldest son of Prince Seowon). Meanwhile, her mother was a granddaughter of Yi Geuk-gam (이극감), one of a group of five brothers who all achieved ministerial rank, a rare feat that established the Gwangju Yi clan as a major political force of the early Joseon period.

=== Marriage ===
Sometime in the early 1540s, Lady Jeong was married to Yi Cho (then known as Prince Deokheung), the eighth son of King Jungjong. She gave birth to her first son in 1545, followed by a second son in 1546, a daughter in 1548, and a third son in 1552, before losing her husband in 1559.

=== Death and aftermath ===
Lady Jeong died eight years later, at the age of 36, and was buried alongside her husband in present-day Namyangju, Gyeonggi Province. The site is known as Deokheungdaewongunmyo (덕흥대원군묘).

At this time, King Myeongjong was childless and their youngest son, Yi Gyun (renamed Yi Yeon, posthumously King Seonjo) was adopted as his heir, acceeding to the throne less than two months after Lady Jeong's death. Because Yi Cho had been the son of a concubine, the new king couldn't follow the example of King Seongjong and posthumously honor his parents as king and queen. As a compromise, the "grand internal prince" (대원군; daewongun) title was created for Yi Cho and conferred upon him in 1569, while Lady Jeong was elevated to the rank of grand princess consort (부부인; bubuin). She was incorrectly indentified as a grand internal princess consort (부대부인; budaebuin) in the 18th century, and modern historical sources maintain the designation.

== Titles ==
- During the reign of King Jungjong (r. 1506–1544):
  - Lady, of the Hadong Jeong clan (하동 정씨; 河東鄭氏; from 24 September 1530)
    - Jeong Se-ho's daughter (정세호의 딸)
    - Lady Jeong (정씨; 鄭氏)
  - Princess Consort Hadong (하동군부인; 河東郡夫人; from unknown date)
- During the reign of King Seonjo (r. 1567–1608):
  - Grand Princess Consort Hadong (하동부부인; 河東府夫人; from 1569)

== Family ==
- Father: Jeong Se-ho (정세호; 1486–1563)
- Mother: Lady, of the Gwangju Yi clan (광주 이씨)
- Sibling(s)
  - Jeong Chang-seo (정창서; 1519–?) (Note: ▪︎1st wife: Lady, of the Jeonju Yi clan (전주 이씨); great-great-great-granddaughter of King Sejo. ▪︎2nd wife: Lady, of the Gwangsan Kim clan (광산 김씨); daughter of Kim Su-won (김수원). ▪︎Issue: 1 daughter. [Lineage: King Sejo → Crown Prince Uigyeong → Grand Prince Wolsan → Prince Deokpung (덕풍군; 1485–1506) → Prince Parim (파림군; 1500–1541) → Lady Yi])
- Husband: Grand Internal Prince Deokheung (덕흥대원군; 2 April 1530 – 14 June 1559)
  - Father-in-law: King Jungjong (중종대왕; 25 April 1488 – 9 December 1544)
  - Biological mother-in-law: Concubine Chang (창빈), of the Ansan An clan (안산 안씨; 11 September 1499 – 17 November 1549)
  - Legal mother-in-law: Queen Munjeong (문정왕후), of the Papyeong Yun clan (파평 윤씨; 12 December 1501 – 15 May 1565)
- Issue(s)
  - Yi Jeong (이정), Prince Hawon (이정 하원군; 1545–1597) (Note: ▪︎1st wife: Princess Consort Namyang (남양군부인), of the Namyang Hong clan (남양 홍씨; 1544–1569); daughter of Hong Seom (홍섬; 1504–1585). ▪︎2nd wife: Princess Consort Sinan (신안군부인), of the Seongju Yi clan (성주 이씨; 1556–1516); daughter of Yi Ui-ro (이의로). ▪︎Issue: 9 sons (6 concubine-born sons), 6 daughters (5 concubine-born daughters).)
  - Yi In (이인), Prince Hareung (하릉군; 1546–1592) (Note: ▪︎Wife: Princess Consort Pyongsan (평산군부인), of the Pyongsan Shin clan (평산 신씨); daughter of Shin Yeo-jong (신여종). ▪︎Issue: 3 sons (1 adopted son and 2 concubine-born sons), 1 concubine-born daughter.)
  - Lady, of the Jeonju Yi clan (전주 이씨; 1548–1637); given name Myeong-sun (명순) (Note: Married An Hwang (안황) from the Sunheung An clan (순흥 안씨).)
  - Yi Yeon (이연), King Seonjo (선조대왕; 6 December 1552 – 16 March 1608)

== Ancestry ==
Ancestors of Hadong Budaebuin

Jeong Heung-in (정흥인)
Jeong In-ji (정인지)
Lady, of the Heungdeok Jin clan (흥덕 진씨)
Jeong Sang-jo (정상조)
Yi Hyu (이휴)
Lady, of the Gyeongju Yi clan (경주 이씨)
Lady, of the Cheongju Han clan (청주 한씨)
Jeong Se-ho (정세호)
An Maeng-dam (안맹담)
An On-cheon (안온천)
Princess Jeongui (정의공주)
Lady, of the Juksan An clan (죽산 안씨)
Yi Chu (이추)
Lady, of the Jeonju Yi clan (전주 이씨)
Lady, of the Musong Yun clan (무송 윤씨)
Grand Internal Princess Consort Hadong
Yi In-son (이인손)
Yi Geuk-gam (이극감)
Lady, of the Gyoha No clan (교하 노씨)
Yi Se-geol (이세걸)
Choe Deok-ro (최덕로)
Lady, of the Chungju Choe clan (충주 최씨)
Lady, of the Munhwa Yu clan (문화 유씨)
Lady, of the Gwangju Yi clan (광주 이씨)
Lady, of the Jeongseon Jeon clan (정선 전씨)

== See also ==
- History of Korea
- Styles and titles in Joseon
