= Deokheung Daewongun =

Father of Seonjo of Joseon (1530–1559)

Yi Cho 이초
- Grand Internal Prince Deokheung
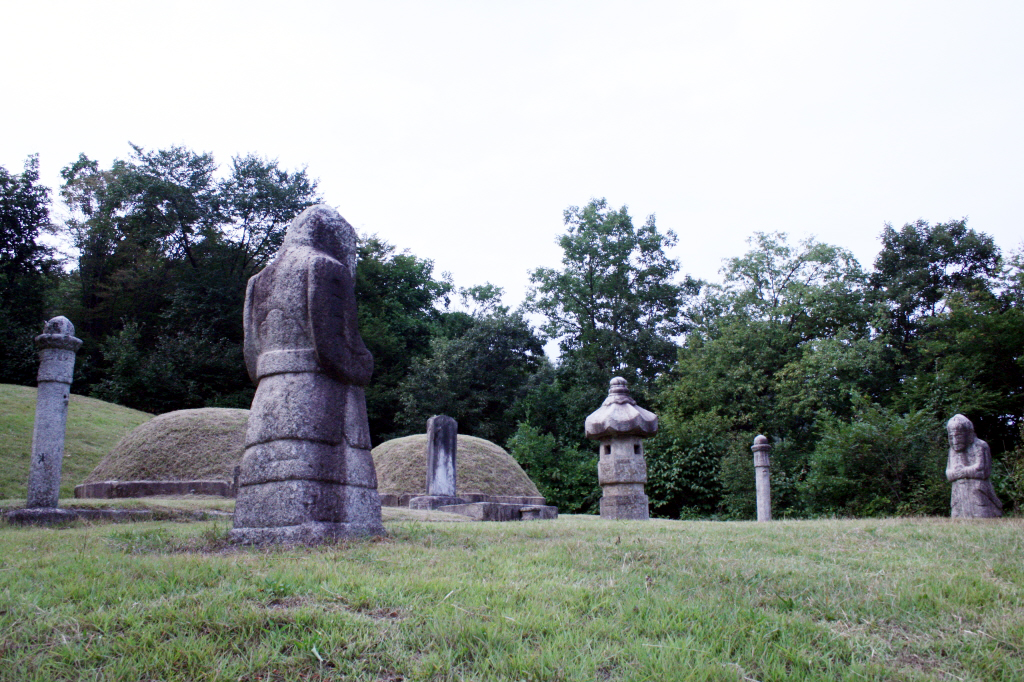
- Deokheung Daewongun's tomb
- Born: Yi Cho; 2 April 1530; Hanseong-bu, Joseon
- Died: 14 June 1559 (aged 29); Dojeong Palace, Sajik-dong, Hanseong-bu, Joseon
- Burial: Deokneung tomb
- Consort: Grand Internal Princess Consort Hadong (m. 1542–1567)
- Issue: 3 sons and 2 daughters
- House: House of Yi
- Father: Jungjong of Joseon
- Mother: Concubine Chang
- Religion: Korean Confucianism

- Deokheung Daewongun
- Hangul: 이초
- Hanja: 李岹
- RR: I Cho
- MR: I Ch'o

Royal title
- Hangul: 덕흥대원군
- Hanja: 德興大院君
- RR: Deokheung daewongun
- MR: Tŏkhŭng taewŏn'gun

Courtesy name
- Hangul: 경앙, 경패
- Hanja: 景仰, 景伂
- RR: Gyeongang, Gyeongpae
- MR: Kyŏngang, Kyŏngp'ae

Childhood name
- Hangul: 이환수
- Hanja: 李歡壽
- RR: I Hwansu
- MR: I Hwansu

Deokheung Daewongun (Korean: 덕흥대원군; Hanja: 德興大院君; 2 April 1530 – 14 June 1559; lit. 'Grand Internal Prince Deokheung'), known before as Prince Deokheung (덕흥군; 德興君) before becoming Daewongun, personal name Yi Cho (이초; 李岹) was a royal family member of the Joseon period and the first Daewongun in Korean. He was the second son of Jungjong of Joseon and Royal Noble Consort Chang of the Ansan An clan, also the biological father of Seonjo of Joseon.

== Biography ==
=== Early life ===
The future Grand Internal Prince Deokheung was born on 2 April 1530 as the 9th son of Jungjong of Joseon and his second son with Royal Noble Consort Chang of the Ansan An clan, the daughter of An Tan-Dae (안탄대) who was the member of Uijeongbu (의정부). He was firstly named Yi Hwan-su (이환수) and later was changed into Yi Cho (이초). Then, on 1538 (33rd year reign of his father), he honoured as Prince Deokheung (덕흥군; 德興君).

=== Marriage and later life ===
In 1542, the grandson of Jeong In-Ji (정인지), Jeong Se-Ho (정세호)'s daughter, Lady of the Hadong Jeong clan (하동 정씨) (the future Hadong Budaebuin) went to his house in Dojeong Palace, Sajik-dong, Hanseong-bu and then they were married. Later, in March 1554, both of his house and his father in-law's house were impeached by some of Ministers, but his half younger brother, King Myeongjong defeated them. Deokheung and his wife had 3 sons and 1 daughter. He also had one concubine named Sun-Dan (순단) and with her, he had one daughter whom named Yi Hye-Ok (이혜옥).

=== Seonjo's ascension to the throne ===
During his lifetime, based on Myeongjong's Annals, he was criticized for being ignorant. In 1567, his third son, Yi Yeon, Prince Haseong (이연 하성군) succeeded Myeongjong who died without any royal heir as the 14th King of Joseon. Meanwhile, those servants who were negative about Myeongjong did not object to the success of Yi-Yeon and immediately agreed.

In 1 November 1569 (2nd year reign of his son), he and his wife, as the biological parents of the King were given royal titles from Prince Deokheung become Grand Internal Prince Deokheung (덕흥대원군; 德興大院君) and from Princess Consort Hadong become Grand Internal Princess Consort Hadong (하동부대부인; 河東府大夫人). After that, the family shrine was established in Dojeong Palace (도정궁) and under the support from Jamjeo (잠저).

Deokheung later died on 14 June 1559 and was buried in San 5–13, Deoksong-ri, Byeolnae-myeon, Namyangju-si, Gyeonggi Province, South Korea (Surak Mountain?).

== Family ==
- Father: Jungjong of Joseon (조선 중종왕; 16 April 1488 – 29 November 1544)
  - Grandfather: Seongjong of Joseon (조선 성종왕; 19 August 1457 – 20 January 1494)
  - Grandmother: Queen Jeonghyeon of the Papyeong Yun clan (정현왕후 윤씨; 21 July 1462 – 13 September 1530)
- Mother:
  - Biological: Concubine Chang of the Ansan An clan (창빈 안씨; 2 September 1499 – 7 November 1549)
    - Grandfather: Ahn Tan-Dae (안탄대)
    - Grandmother: Lady Hwang (부인 황씨)
  - Legal: Queen Munjeong of the Papyeong Yun clan (문정왕후 윤씨; 2 December 1501 – 5 May 1565)
    - Grandfather: Yun Ji-Im, Internal Prince Pasan (윤지임 파산부원군; 1475 – 14 April 1534)
    - Grandmother: Internal Princess Consort Jeonseong of the Jeonui Yi clan (전성부부인 전의 이씨; 1475–1511)

Consort(s) and their respective issue

1. Grand Internal Princess Consort Hadong of the Hadong Jeong clan (하동부대부인 하동 정씨; 23 September 1522 – 24 June 1567)
  1. Yi Jeong, Prince Hawon (이정 하원군; 1545–1597)
  2. Yi Myeong-sun (이명순; 1548–?)
  3. Yi In, Prince Hareung (이인 하릉군; 1546–1592)
  4. Yi Yeon, Prince Haseong (이연 하성군; 26 November 1552 – 16 March 1608)
2. Sun-dan (순단)
  1. Yi Hye-ok (이혜옥; ?–1599)

== Others ==
- After the death of Crown Prince Sunhoe, the only son of King Myeongjong, he decided to choose a successor for the throne and the chosen was among the sons of Deokheung Daewongun. Myeongjong also selected Han Yun-Myeong (한윤명) and Jeong Ji-Yeon (정지연) as the teachers for Deokheung's sons. In the other hand, Yun Wŏnhyŏng expected a successor from among his sons and forced him to marry his daughter with the son of Deokheung. At first, Deokheung accepted it, but Myeongjong objected and eventually collapsed.
