= Gwiin Jo (Injo) =

Korean royal consort (c. 1619–1652)

- Royal Consort of the Junior First Rank
- Born: c. 1619; Joseon
- Died: 24 January 1652; Hanseong, Joseon
- Consort of: King Injo
- Issue Detail: 2 sons, 1 daughter
- Clan: Sunchang Jo (by birth); Jeonju Yi (by marriage)
- Dynasty: Yi
- Father: Jo Gi
- Mother: Han-ok

Korean name
- Hangul: 귀인 조씨
- Hanja: 貴人 趙氏
- RR: Gwiin Jossi
- MR: Kwiin Chossi

Gwiin Jo (Korean: 귀인 조씨; Hanja: 貴人 趙氏; c. 1619 (Note: Her year of birth has also been given as 1617 or simply noted as unknown.) – 24 January 1652), of the Sunchang Jo clan, commonly known as Soyong Jo, was a consort of King Injo, the 16th monarch of Joseon. She was ultimately forced to commit suicide by poisoning during the reign of King Hyojong, and is remembered today as one of the greatest femmes fatales in Korean history.

== Biography ==
=== Early life and lineage ===
Lady Jo was born during the reign of Gwanghaegun, but the exact date of birth is unknown. Her father was Jo Gi (조기) and her mother was a concubine of slave origins named Han-ok (한옥).

=== Life in the palace ===
Lady Jo became a palace lady in 1630 and impeachments claiming she had entered the palace through an illicit connection rather than being chosen according to proper etiquette. According to rumors circulating at the time, it was well-known that she was a person presented by Jeong Baek-chang (정백창), the brother-in-law of Queen Inyeol, so it appears that her entry into the palace was not unrelated to Queen Inyeol's wishes.

Lady Jo later caught King Injo's eye and became a favored concubine overnight. She gave birth to Princess Hyomyeong in 1638, followed by two sons, Yi Jing (이징) and Yi Suk (이숙), in 1639 and 1641, respectively. Her rank also changed rapidly, from the lowest junior fourth (숙원; sugwon) in 1638 to senior fourth (소원; sowon) in 1639, and senior third (소용; soyong) in 1640. By the time she rose to the senior second rank (소의; soui) in 1645, she was the king's sole favorite, overshadowing Gwiin Jang (귀인 장씨) and the other royal consorts. Lady Jo also supposedly caused discord in the relationship between King Injo and his young second wife, Queen Jangnyeol, leading to their falling out.

The Veritable Records of the Joseon Dynasty explicitly describe her as "wicked and immoral" and her character as deceitful, and state that "relying on the king's favor, she framed those she disliked".

Since the day she reached the senior third rank, Lady Jo constantly maligned Crown Prince Sohyeon and Crown Princess Minhoe in front of King Injo. Although the Veritable Records do not mention her involvement in the crown prince's death, they document her habitual slander against the couple, while unofficial histories claim that Yi Hyeong-ik (이형익), the acupuncturist who treated Crown Prince Sohyeon before his death, frequently visited her private residence and Lady Jo instigated him to poison the crown prince through her mother.

Subsequently, Crown Princess Minhoe was sentenced to death after being accused of attempting to poison Injo. The theory that the incident was plotted by Lady Jo endures to this day. Another modern view is that this was actually King Injo's intention as he didn't want Crown Princess Minhoe, who still had three sons of her own, to build a separate power base and stand in opposition to himself and his chosen heir, the former Grand Prince Bongrim (posthumously King Hyojong); Lady Jo simply understood his wishes and acted accordingly, and for his part, Injo fully utilized her ambition.

=== Downfall and death ===
King Injo became bedridden in early 1649 and Lady Jo was finally promoted to the junior first rank (귀인; gwiin) three months before his death.

In 1651, she was accused of cursing Queen Jangnyeol and her niece, Princess Consort Yeongpung (영풍군부인); the princess consort was Lady Jo's eldest daughter-in-law. During the investigation into the curse incident, the exiled Kim Ja-jeom was charged with plotting to dethrone King Hyojong and executed alongside his sons. His grandson, Kim Se-ryong (김세룡), who was married to Princess Hyomyeong, was also executed.

Lady Jo was ordered to commit suicide in early 1652, but despite petitions asking for her demotion to the commoner class, she retained her status and her funeral was conducted according to the rites befitting her rank. The location of her tomb remains unknown.

Lady Jo's mother died before being punished for her involvement, and Hyojong refused to heed petitions demanding that Princess Hyomyeong be held accountable for her crimes, instead opting to exile her and her younger brothers. The two princes were eventually released in 1656 followed by Princess Hyomyeong in 1658, notwithstanding the strong opposition from court officials. While those associated with the case and their families were completely ruined, the three siblings experienced a noticeably light punishment due to King Hyojong's protection.

== Titles ==
- During the reign of Gwanghaegun (r. 1608–1623):
  - Lady, of the Sunchang Jo clan (순창 조씨; 淳昌趙氏; from unknown date)
    - Jo Gi's daughter (조기의 딸)
    - Lady Jo (조씨; 趙氏)
- During the reign of King Injo (r. 1623–1649):
  - Palace Lady (궁녀; 宮女; from 1630)
  - Sugwon (Note: lit. ''Lady of Warm Beauty'') (숙원; 淑媛; from 10 February 1638), royal consort of the junior fourth rank
  - Sowon (Note: lit. ''Lady of Bright Beauty'') (소원; 昭媛; from 24 January 1639), royal consort of the senior fourth rank
  - Soyong (Note: lit. ''Lady of Bright Countenance'') (소용; 昭容; 12 October 1640), royal consort of the senior third rank
  - Soui (Note: lit. ''Lady of Bright Deportment'') (소의; 昭儀; from 19 November 1645), royal consort of the senior second rank
  - Gwiin (Note: lit. ''Noble Lady'') (귀인; 貴人; from 23 March 1649), royal consort of the junior first rank

== Family ==
- Father: Jo Gi (조기; 1574–?)
- Legal mother: Lady, of the Cheongsong Shim clan (청송 심씨) (Note: Jo Gi's legitimate wife; daughter of Shim Heun (심흔).)
- Biological mother: Han-ok (한옥; ?–1652)
- Consort of: King Injo (인조대왕; 7 December 1595 – 17 June 1649)
- Issue
  - Princess Hyomyeong (효명옹주; 1638–1700)
  - Yi Jing (이징), Prince Sungseon (숭선군; 11 November 1639 – 14 February 1690) (Note: ▪︎Wife: Princess Consort Yeongpung (영풍군부인), of the Pyongsan Shin clan (평산 신씨; 1639–1692); second daughter of Shin Ik-jeon (신익전; 1605–1660), granddaughter of Chief State Councilor Shin Heum (신흠; 1566–1628) and maternal niece of Queen Jangnyeol. ▪︎Issue: 2 sons, 4 daughters.)
  - Yi Suk (이숙), Prince Nakseon (낙석군; 9 December 1641 – 26 April 1695) (Note: ▪︎Wife: Princess Consort Dongwon (동원군부인), of the Gangneung Kim clan (강릉 김씨; ?–1722); daughter of Kim Deuk-won (김득원). ▪︎Issue: 1 adopted son.)

== Ancestry ==
Jo Chim (조침)
Jo Hyo-jeong (조효정)
Jo Cheon-sang (조천상)
Jo Gi (조기)
Gwiin Jo
Han-ok (한옥)

== In popular culture ==
- Portrayed by Kwon Ki-sun in the 1981 KBS1 TV series Daemyeong.
- Portrayed by Seo Hyun-jin in the 2012–2013 MBC TV series The King's Doctor.
- Portrayed by Lee Chae-mi and Kim Hyun-joo in the 2013 JTBC TV series Blooded Palace: The War of Flowers.
- Portrayed by Kim Min-seo in the 2015 MBC TV series Splendid Politics.
- Portrayed by Ahn Eun-jin in the 2022 film The Night Owl.
- Portrayed by So Yoo-jin in the 2023 MBC TV series My Dearest.

== See also ==
- History of Korea
- Styles and titles in Joseon
- Society of Joseon
- Other notorious women of the Joseon period:
  - Ŏudong
  - Deposed Queen Yun
  - Chang Noksu
  - Queen Munjeong
  - Jeong Nan-jeong
  - Kim Kaesi
  - Huibin Jang
