= Grand Prince Inpyeong =

Korean nobleman and prisoner (1622–1658)

Grand Prince Inp'yŏng

Grand Prince of Joseon
- Born: Yi Yo (이요; 李㴭); 10 December 1622; Joseon
- Died: 13 May 1658 (aged 35); Joseon
- Spouse: Princess Consort Bokcheon of the Dongbok Oh clan
- Issue: 6 sons and 4 daughters
- House: House of Yi
- Father: Injo of Joseon (biological); Grand Prince Neungchang (adopted)
- Mother: Queen Inyeol (biological)

Korean name
- Hangul: 이요
- Hanja: 李㴭
- RR: I Yo
- MR: I Yo

Royal title
- Hangul: 인평대군
- Hanja: 麟坪大君
- RR: Inpyeong daegun
- MR: Inp'yŏng taegun

Grand Prince Inp'yŏng (10 December 1622 – 13 May 1658) was the third son of King Injo of Joseon. After the death of Grand Prince Neungchang, Inp'yŏng became his adopted son. When his father surrendered to the Qing dynasty, Grand Prince Inp'yŏng was sent to Qing as a hostage. His 10th generation descendant was Gojong of Korea who became king upon the death of King Cheoljong.

== Biography ==
On 10 December 1622, in Lunar calendar, Grand Prince Inp'yŏng was born as the son of Prince Neungyang, the grandson of Seonjo. He entered the palace after his father became the king by coup in 1623. In 1629, Inp'yŏng became grand prince. He had his marriage in 1634, age of 12 with Lady Oh of the Dongbok Oh clan who was the second daughter of Oh Dan, one of the officials of Injo.

After the Qing invasion of Joseon, Grand Prince Inp'yŏng with Crown Prince Sohyeon, and Grand Prince Bongrim were sent to Qing dynasty. Like his brothers, Inp'yŏng was repeatedly being sent back to Joseon. Because of this, Inp'yŏng got great stress, and got serious illness. The visits to Qing for Inp'yŏng did not end after the death of Injo of Joseon. During the reign of Hyojong of Joseon, Inp'yŏng was again sent to Qing as an ambassador. But, the public opinion of Inp'yŏng was only worsen.

Officials argued that Inp'yŏng is trying to get hospitality by visiting the Qing Dynasty a lot. Song Si-yeol was angry on how Hyojong was against his father's advice of taking care of Inp'yŏng but, sending him as an ambassador to the tiger cave (which meant the Qing dynasty). In 1658, with the illness that Inp'yŏng got while visiting Qing dynasty a lot, he died on 13 May 1658 (Lunar Calendar). Hyojong weeped for his younger brother which made him want to stay at Inp'yŏng's house too long to the point his officials had to come back to the palace. Hyojong eventually came back to the palace.

== Family ==
- Father - Injo of Joseon (조선 인조; 7 December 1595 – 17 June 1649)
- Mother - Queen Inyeol of the Cheongju Han clan (인렬왕후 한씨; 16 August 1594 – 16 January 1636)
- Consort - Princess Consort Bokcheon of the Dongbok Oh clan (복천부부인 동복 오씨; 1622–1658); second daughter of Oh Dan (오단; 1592–1640)
- Issue
  - Son - Yi Ok, Prince Boknyeong (이욱 복녕군; 1639–1670)
  - Unnamed son (1640–1646)
  - Son - Yi Jeong, Prince Bokchang (이정; 1641–1680)
  - Unnamed son (1642–1647)
  - Son - Yi Nam, Prince Bokpyeong (이남; 1647–1680)
  - Son - Yi Yeon, Prince Bokseon (이연; 1648–1452)
  - Daughter - Lady Yi of the Jeonju Yi clan (전주 이씨; 1651–?)
  - Daughter - Lady Yi of the Jeonju Yi clan (전주 이씨; 1653–1658)
  - Daughter - Lady Yi of the Jeonju Yi clan (전주 이씨; 1654–1660)
  - Daughter - Yi Geum-on (이금온, 李金溫), Lady Yi of the Jeonju Yi clan (전주 이씨; 1654–1686)

== In popular culture ==
- Portrayed by Choi Woo-sung in the TV series Daemyeong.
- Portrayed by Ji Eun-sung in the TV series Blooded Palace: The War of Flowers.
