= Queen Inseon =

Queen of Joseon from 1649 to 1659

Queen Dowager of Joseon
- Tenure: 23 June 1659 – 30 March 1674
- Predecessor: Queen Dowager Jaui
- Successor: Queen Dowager Hyeonyeol

Queen Consort of Joseon
- Tenure: 17 June 1649 – 23 June 1659
- Predecessor: Queen Jangnyeol
- Successor: Queen Myeongseong

Crown Princess of Joseon
- Tenure: 14 November 1645 – 17 June 1649
- Predecessor: Crown Princess Kang
- Successor: Crown Princess Kim
- Born: 9 February 1619; Ansan County, Gyeonggi Province, Joseon
- Died: 30 March 1674 (aged 55); Hoesangjeon, Gyeongdeokgung, Hanseong, Joseon
- Burial: Nyeongneung, Yeoju, South Korea
- Spouse: King Hyojong (m. 1631; died 1659)
- Issue Detail: 3 sons, 8 daughters (1 adopted daughter)
Regnal name
- Hyosuk Jeongbeom (효숙정범; 孝肅貞範) (Note: Known as honorific name (존호; 尊號) in the Sinosphere, its closest equivalent in the English-speaking world is the regnal name.)
Posthumous name
- Queen Gyeongryeol Myeongheon Inseon (경렬명헌인선왕후; 敬烈明獻仁宣王后)
- Clan: Deoksu Jang (by birth); Jeonju Yi (by marriage)
- Dynasty: Yi
- Father: Jang Yu, Internal Prince Sinpung
- Mother: Internal Princess Consort Yeongga, of the (new) Andong Kim clan

Korean name
- Hangul: 인선왕후
- Hanja: 仁順王后
- RR: Inseon wanghu
- MR: Insŏn wanghu

Queen Inseon (Korean: 인선왕후; Hanja: 仁宣王后; 9 February 1619 – 30 March 1674), of the Deoksu Jang clan, was the wife of King Hyojong, the 17th monarch of Joseon, and the mother of King Hyeonjong. She was queen of Joseon from 1649 until her husband's death in 1659, and was then styled as Queen Dowager Hyosuk during the reign of her son.

== Biography ==
=== Early life and lineage ===
The future Queen Inseon was born during the reign of Gwanghaegun, as the youngest child among one son and two daughters. Her father was Jang Yu (장유), who would later become right state councilor, and her mother was a lady from the (new) Andong Kim clan.

Both of her parents were royal descendants: her father was a 4th great-grandson of King Sejo's second son, Prince Deokwon (덕원군), whereas her mother was a great-great-granddaughter of King Seongjong's 11th son, Prince Gyeongmyeong (경명군) and a 4th great-granddaughter of King Jeongjong's 14th son, Prince Jeongseok (정석군). Furthermore, Lady Jang's great-grandfather, Gwon Gae (권개), was the elder brother of Gwon Yul and a distant nephew of Gwon Ram. She was also a second cousin of Deposed Queen Yu, sharing Jeong Yu-gil (정유길) as their common ancestor.

=== Marriage ===
In 1631, at the age of 12, Lady Jang married Grand Prince Bongrim, the second son of King Injo and Queen Inyeol. After marriage, she gave birth to two daughters in 1634 and 1636, respectively.

Lady Jang fled to Ganghwa Island during the Qing invasion alongside her husband and sister-in-law, Crown Princess Minhoe. As enemy troops overran the fortress, her maternal grandfather, Kim Sang-yong (김상용), set fire to the gunpowder reserve and commited suicide. When King Injo surrendered to the Qing on 30 January 1637, Grand Prince Bongrim and his brothers, Crown Prince Sohyeon and Grand Prince Inpyeong, were taken as hostages to Mukden as required by the peace treaty, and Lady Jang and Crown Princess Minhoe followed their husbands. They would remain in captivity until 1645. Throughout this period, Lady Jang gave to two sons and three more daughters. The couple welcomed their first son in 1637 or 1638, but the child would die young. Their only surviving son, Yi Yeon, was born in 1641, and the three daughters in 1640, 1642 and 1643 or early 1644. After their return to Joseon, there was a third son in 1645 and two daughters in 1646 and 1648.

=== Later life ===
Crown Prince Sohyeon died under mysterious circumstances soon after his return in 1645. Subsequently, Grand Prince Bongrim and Lady Jang were also released. Grand Prince Bongrim (posthumously King Hyojong) was appointed as the new crown prince without delay and succeeded King Injo in 1649. Lady Jang thus became crown princess and then queen.

Her physical appearance was said to be chubby since childhood, and while her character has been described as benevolent, she was frugal and stern in her role as head of the internal court. However, she only played a supporting role to her husband and never involved herself in politics, perhaps learning from the fate of Crown Princess Minhoe.

After King Hyojong's death in 1659, Yi Yeon (posthumously King Hyeonjong) acceded to the throne and Lady Jang was elevated to the position of queen dowager, receiving the honorific name Hyosuk (효숙; lit. ''filial and solemn'').

=== Death ===
At an unspecified time, Lady Jang suffered a stroke that left her unable to use her left hand and already quite overweight, cronic illness caused her severe swelling in her later years. She died at the age of 55, having survived her husband by 15 years, and was buried alongside him within Nyeongneung (녕릉), today part of the Yeongnyeongneung burial ground in Yeoju, Gyeonggi Province. She was conferred the posthumous name Inseon (인선), meaning to bestow affection and submit to righteousness ("in"), and being renowned for one's compassion ("seon").

Lady Jang often exchanged letters written in Hangul with her daughters. 54 of them, addressed to Princess Sukmyeong (숙명공주), are extant and represent a valuable resource for researchers.

== Titles ==
- During the reign of Gwanghaegun (r. 1608–1623):
  - Lady, of the Deoksu Jang clan (덕수 장씨; 德水張氏; from 9 February 1619)
    - Jang Yu's daughter (장유의 딸)
    - Lady Jang (장씨; 張氏)
- During the reign of King Injo (r. 1623–1649):
  - Grand Princess Consort Pungan (풍안부부인; 豊安府夫人; from 1631)
  - Crown Princess (왕세제빈; 王世弟嬪; from 14 November 1645)
- During the reign of King Hyojong (r. 1649–1659):
  - Queen (왕비; 王妃; from 17 June 1649)
- During the reign of King Hyeonjong (r. 1659–1674):
  - Queen Dowager Hyosuk (효숙왕대비; 孝肅王大妃; from 23 June 1659)
  - Queen Inseon (인선왕후; 仁宣王后; from 1674)

== Family ==
- Father: Jang Yu (장유), Internal Prince Sinpung (신풍부원군; 22 January 1587 – 30 April 1638)
- Mother: Internal Princess Consort Yeongga (영가부부인), of the (new) Andong Kim clan (신 안동 김씨; 1585 – 19 January 1654); given name Yi-sun (이순)
- Sibling(s)
  - Jang Seon-jing (장선징; 1614–1678) (Note: ▪︎1st wife: Lady, of the Haepyeong Yun clan (해평 윤씨); daughter of Yun Jong-ji (윤종지) — Divorced after being captured during the Qing invasion. ▪︎2nd wife: Lady, of the Gyeongju Yi clan (경주 이씨); daughter of Yi Seung-hyo (이승효). ▪︎Issue: 1 son.)
  - Lady, of the Deoksu Jang clan (덕수 장씨)
- Husband: King Hyojong (효종대왕; 3 July 1619 – 23 June 1659)
  - Father-in-law: King Injo (인조대왕; 7 December 1595 – 17 June 1649)
  - Mother-in-law: Queen Inyeol (인렬왕후), of the Cheongju Han clan (청주 한씨; 16 August 1594 – 16 January 1636)
  - Stepmother-in-law: Queen Jangnyeol (장렬왕후), of the Yangju Jo clan (양주 조씨; 16 December 1624 – 20 September 1688)
- Issue
  - Princess Suksin (숙신공주; 1634 – 21 September 1645)
  - Princess Sukan (숙안공주; 1 June 1636 – 2 February 1698) (Note: Married Hong Deuk-gi (홍득기), Prince Consort Ikpyeong (익평위; 1635–1673) from the Namyang Hong clan (남양 홍씨). They had issue (1 son).)
  - Unnamed son (c. 1637–1642)
  - Princess Sukmyeong (숙명공주; 17 March 1640 – 16 April 1699) (Note: Married Shim Ik-hyeon (심익현), Prince Consort Cheongpyeong (청평위; 1641–1683) from the Cheongsong Shim clan (청송 심씨); first cousin eight times removed of Queen Soheon. They had issue (2 sons).)
  - Yi Yeon (이연), King Hyeonjong (현종대왕; 14 March 1641 – 17 September 1674)
  - Princess Sukhwi (숙휘공주; 17 March 1642 – 21 November 1696) (Note: Married Jeong Je-hyeon (정제현), Prince Consort Inpyeong (인평위; 1642–1662) from the Yeonil Jeong clan (연일 정씨). They had issue (2 sons, 1 daughter).)
  - Unnamed daughter (c. 1643–1644)
  - Unnamed son (1645)
  - Princess Sukjeong (숙정공주; 13 December 1646 – 13 June 1668) (Note: Married Jeong Jae-ryun (정재륜), Prince Consort Dongpyeong (동평위; 1648–1723) from the Dongnae Jeong clan (동래 정씨). They had issue (1 son, 1 daughter).)
  - Princess Sukgyeong (숙경공주; 22 February 1648 – 17 February 1671) (Note: Married Won Mong-rin (원몽린), Prince Consort Heungpyeong (흥평위; 1648–1674) from the Wonju Won clan (원주 원씨). They had issue (1 adopted son, 1 daughter).)
  - Princess Uisun (의순공주; 1635–1662); given name Ae-suk (애숙) — Adopted.

== Ancestry ==
Ancestors of Queen Inseon

Jang Im-jung (장임중)
Jang Il (장일)
Jang Un-ik 장운익
Seong Ja-je (성자제)
Lady, of the Changnyeong Seong clan (창녕 성씨)
Jang Yu, Internal Prince Sinpung (신풍부원군 장유)
Park Ran (박란)
Park Sung-won (박숭원)
Lady, of the Yi clan (이씨)
Lady, of the Miryang Park clan (밀양 박씨)
Queen Inseon
Kim Saeng-hae (김생해)
Kim Geuk-hyo (김극효)
Lady, of the Jeonju Yi clan (전주 이씨)
Kim Sang-yong (김상용)
Jeong Yu-gil (정유길)
Lady, of the Dongnae Jeong clan (동래 정씨)
Lady, of the Wonju Won clan (원주 원씨)
Internal Princess Consort Yeongga, of the (new) Andong Kim clan (영가부부인 신 안동 김씨)
Gwon Cheol (권철)
Gwon Gae (권개)
Lady, of the Changnyeong Jo clan (창녕 조씨)
Lady, of the Andong Gwon clan (안동 권씨)

== In popular culture ==
- Portrayed by Won Mi-kyung in the 1981 KBS1 TV series Daemyeong.
- Portrayed by Kim Hye-sun in the 2012–2013 MBC TV series The King's Doctor.
- Portrayed by Lee Mun-jeong in the 2013 JTBC TV series Blooded Palace: The War of Flowers.

== See also ==
- History of Korea
- Political factions of Joseon
- Styles and titles in Joseon

== Notes ==
Queen Inseon Deoksu Jang clan
Royal titles
Preceded by Queen Jangnyeol of the Yangju Jo clan	Queen Consort of Joseon; 1649–1659	Succeeded by Queen Myeongseong of the Cheongpung Kim clan
Preceded by Queen Dowager Jaui of the Yangju Jo clan	Queen Dowager of Joseon; 1659–1674	Succeeded by Queen Dowager Hyeonyeol of the Cheongpung Kim clan
