= Ch'oe Myŏnggil =

Korean politician (1586–1647)

Ch'oe Myŏnggil 최명길

Chief State Councillor
- In office August 27, 1642 – December 8, 1642
- Preceded by: Yi Sŏnggu
- Succeeded by: Sin Kyŏngjin
- In office 1638 – February 6, 1640
- Preceded by: Yi Hongju
- Succeeded by: Hong Sŏbong

Left State Councillor
- In office August 26, 1637 – October 19, 1638
- Preceded by: Yi Sŏnggu
- Succeeded by: Sin Kyŏngjin

Right State Councillor
- In office May 3, 1637 – 1637
- Monarch: King Injo of Joseon
- Preceded by: Yi Sŏnggu
- Succeeded by: Chang Yu

Personal details
- Born: October 7, 1586 Joseon
- Died: June 19, 1647 (aged 60) Joseon
- Party: Westerners (Seo-in)
- Spouse(s): Lady Jang of the Indong Jang clan Lady Heo of the Yangcheon Heo clan
- Children: Choe Hu-sang (son); Lady Choe (daughter); Choe Hu-ryang (adopted son)
- Parents: Ch'oe Kinam (father); Lady Yu of the Jeonju Yu clan (mother)

Korean name
- Hangul: 최명길
- Hanja: 崔鳴吉
- RR: Choe Myeonggil
- MR: Ch'oe Myŏnggil

Royal title
- Hangul: 완성군, later 완성부원군
- Hanja: 完城君, later 完城府院君
- Lit.: Prince Wanseong, later Internal Prince Wanseong
- RR: Wanseonggun, later Wanseong buwongun
- MR: Wansŏnggun, later Wansŏng puwŏn'gun

Art name
- Hangul: 지천, 창랑
- Hanja: 遲川, 滄浪
- RR: Jicheon, Changrang
- MR: Chich'ŏn, Ch'angnang

Courtesy name
- Hangul: 자겸
- Hanja: 子謙
- RR: Jagyeom
- MR: Chagyŏm

Posthumous name
- Hangul: 문충
- Hanja: 文忠
- RR: Munchung
- MR: Munch'ung

Ch'oe Myŏnggil (Korean: 최명길; Hanja: 崔鳴吉; 7 October 1586 – June 19, 1647) was a Korean Joseon politician and Neo-Confucian scholar of the Yangmingist school who came from the Jeonju Choe clan. He served as the Joseon Chief State Councilor from 1638 to 1640 and 1642 to 1644.

== Works ==
- Jicheon Yujip (지천유집 遲川遺集)
- Jicheon Jucha (지천주차 遲川奏箚)

== Family ==
- Father: Choe Gi-nam (최기남, 崔起南; 1559–1619)
  - Grandfather: Choe Su-jun (최수준, 崔秀俊)
- Mother: Lady Yu of the Jeonju Yu clan (정경부인 전주 유씨, 貞敬夫人 全州 柳氏; 1556–1615)
  - Grandfather: Yu Yeong-rip (유영립, 柳永立; 1537–1599)
- Siblings
  - Older brother: Choe Nae-gil, Prince Wancheon (최내길 완천군, 崔來吉 完川君; 1583–1649)
  - Younger brother: Choe Hye-gil (최혜길, 崔惠吉; 1591–1662)
  - Younger brother: Choe Ga-gil (최가길, 崔嘉吉)
- Wives and children:
  - Lady Jang of the Indong Jang clan (정경부인 인동 장씨, 貞敬夫人 仁同 張氏); eldest daughter of Jang-Man (장만, 張晩) – No issue, so they adopted Choe Hye-gil's 2nd son.
    - Adopted son: Choe Hu-ryang, Prince Walleung (최후량 완릉군, 崔後亮 完陵君; 1616–1693)
      - Adopted daughter-in-law: Ahn Jung-im, Lady Ahn of the Gwangju Ahn clan (안중임 광주 안씨, 安仲任 廣州 安氏; 1621–1673); eldest daughter of Ahn Heon-jing (안헌징, 安獻徵)
        - Grandson: Choe Seok-jin (최석진, 崔錫晉; b. 1640)
        - Grandson: Choe Seok-jeong (최석정, 崔錫鼎; 1646–1715); become the adoptive son of his uncle, Choe Hu-sang
          - Granddaughter-in-law: Lady Yi Gyeong-eok (이경억, 李慶億)
            - Great-Grandson: Choe Chang-dae (최창대, 崔昌大)
        - Grandson: Choe Seok-hang (최석항, 崔錫恒; 1654–1724)
        - Granddaughter: Lady Choe Du-sik (최두식, 崔斗息; b. 1651)
          - Grandson-in-law: Yun Je-myeong (윤제명, 尹濟明)
        - Granddaughter: Lady Choe Dan-sik (최단식, 崔端息; b. 1656)
          - Grandson-in-law: Shin Gok (신곡, 申轂)
  - Lady Heo of the Yangcheon Heo clan (정경부인 양천 허씨, 貞敬夫人 陽川 許氏); daughter of Heo In (허인, 許嶙)
    - Son: Choe Hu-sang (최후상, 崔後尙; 1631–1680) – No issue, so he adopted Choe Hu-ryang's 2nd son.
  - Unnamed concubine (첩)
    - Daughter: Lady Choe (최씨, 崔氏)
      - Son-in-law: Gu Hoeng (구횡, 具鐄; b. 1638) of the Neungseong Gu clan; son of Gu In-hu, Internal Prince Neungcheon (구인후 능천부원군, 具仁垕 綾川府院君)

== In popular culture ==
=== Drama and Television series ===
- Portrayed by Kim Sung-won in the 1981 KBS1 TV Series Daemyeong.
- Portrayed by Kim Ha-kyun in the 2013 JTBC TV series Blooded Palace: The War of Flowers.
- Portrayed by Jeon No-min in the 2014 tvN TV series The Three Musketeers.
- Portrayed by Im Ho in the 2015 MBC TV series Splendid Politics.
- Portrayed by Kim Tae-hoon (actor) in the 2023 MBC TV series My Dearest.
- Portrayed by Lee Byung-hun in the 2017 film The Fortress.

=== Webtoon ===
- Portrayed in the 2019 KakaoPage Webtoon series Finally, The Blue Flame

== See also ==
- Kim Jip
- Kim Yuk
