= Princess Hyomyeong =

Korean princess (1638–1700)

Princess Hyomyeong 효명옹주

Princess of Joseon
- Born: 1638
- Died: September 1700 (aged 62–63)
- Spouse: Kim Se-ryung (m.1647-d.1651)
- House: Yi
- Father: Injo of Joseon
- Mother: Royal Consort Gwi-in of the Okcheon Jo clan

- Princess Hyomyeong
- Hangul: 효명옹주
- Hanja: 孝明翁主
- RR: Hyomyeong ongju
- MR: Hyomyŏng ongju

Princess Hyomyeong (1638 – September 1700), was the only daughter of King Injo of Joseon with Royal Consort Gwi-in of the Okcheon Jo clan.

== Biography ==
The princess was born in 1638 during her father’s 24th year of reign.

Prior to her birth, Queen Inryeol had given birth to a princess in 1626 but died prematurely. With the birth of being the only princess within princes, King Injo showered her with affection.

She was formally invested as a princess in her 11th year in 1647 when she was given her title Princess Hyomyeong (효명옹주; 孝明翁主), and the selection for her consort was held in the same year.

It was said that King Injo let her have the option of choosing her husband, but Royal Consort Gwi-in Jo had manipulated the outcome with the consent from Kim Chajŏm. Thus arranged for her daughter to be matched with Kim Chajŏm's grandson, Kim Se-ryung, and eventually they were married.

She continued to live in the palace after the marriage and only left to live outside the palace two years later. King Injo cherished her deeply, resulting in her self-centered behaviour and bad relationship with her sister-in-law. After King Injo’s death, Lady Gwi-in Jo was accused of putting curses on Queen Jangryeol and King Hyojong, and Princess Hyomyeong admitted to burying unlucky things in the palace and Grand Prince Inpyeong’s residence with regard to the curse.

Although there were requests to interrogate both Princess Hyomyeong and Kim Se-ryung, only her husband was questioned, and was sentenced to death in 1651, as was his grandfather Kim Chajŏm. She was then stripped of her title, only known as Kim Se-ryung’s wife (김세룡의 처) from then on.

The princess was exiled to Tongcheon but was soon relocated to Icheon since the weather in Tongcheon was cold that year. In 1655, King Hyojong ordered for her place of exile to be moved again in order for her to live together with her siblings, Prince Sungseon and Prince Nakseon.

Three years later, she was released from the sentence and continued to live under close surveillance until her death in September 1700 when she was around 62 to 63 years old during King Sukjong’s 24th year of reign.

== Family ==
- Father - Injo of Joseon (조선 인조; 7 December 1595 – 17 June 1649)
  - Grandfather - Wonjong of Joseon (조선 원종; 2 August 1580 – 29 December 1619) (Note: As the sixth illegitimate son of King Seonjo, he became Prince Jeongwon. In 1623, he was given the posthusmous title Daewongun as the birth father of King Injo. After considerable opposition, he was posthusmously honored as King Wonjong in 1632.)
  - Grandmother - Queen Inheon of the Neungseong Gu clan (인헌왕후 능성 구씨; 23 May 1578 – 10 February 1626)
- Mother - Royal Consort Gwi-in of the Okcheon Jo clan (귀인 조씨; 1619 – 24 January 1652)
  - Grandfather - Jo Gi (조기; 趙琦; 1574–?)
  - Grandmother - Han Ok (한옥; 漢玉), Lady Han of the Cheongju Han clan (정부인 청주 한씨; 貞夫人 淸州 韓氏; 1578–?), Jo Gi’s second wife
- Sibling(s)
  - Younger brother - Yi Jing, Prince Sungseon (숭선군 징; 1639–1690)
  - Younger brother - Yi Suk, Prince Nakseon (낙선군 숙; 1641–1695)
- Husband - Kim Se-ryung (김세룡; 金世龍), Prince Consort Nakseong (낙성위; 洛城尉; 1636–1651) — No issue.

== In popular culture ==
- Portrayed by Lee Young-eun and Lee Chae-Mi in the 2013 JTBC TV series Blooded Palace: The War of Flowers.
