= Princess Suknyeong =

Korean princess (1649–1668)

Princess Suknyeong 숙녕옹주
- Born: 1649; Joseon
- Died: 28 June 1668 (aged 18–19); Joseon
- Burial: Songneung-ri, Jingeon-myeon, Namyangju, Gyeonggi Province
- Spouse: Park Pil-seong, Prince Consort Geumpyeong (m. 1662–1666 or 1668)
- Issue: Park Hui-gyeong
- House: House of Yi (by birth); Bannam Park (by marriage)
- Father: Hyojong of Joseon
- Mother: Royal Noble Consort An of the Gyeongju Yi clan

Princess Suknyeong (Korean: 숙녕옹주; Hanja: 淑寧翁主; 1649 – 28 June 1668) was a Korean Joseon Dynasty Princess, and the only daughter of King Hyojong of Joseon and Royal Noble Consort An.

== Biography ==
=== Early life ===
The Princess was born as the only child and daughter in 1649, during her grandfather's King Injo's 27th year of reign, to then Grand Prince Bongrim and Lady Yi of the Gyeongju Yi clan. She is the younger half-sister of King Hyeonjong and the aunt to King Sukjong.

=== Marriage ===
The 13 year old Princess married the 10 year old Park Pil-seong, son of Park Tae-jang, from the Bannam Park clan on 10 April 1662 lunar calendar; the 3rd year reign of Hyeonjong of Joseon. A year later on 4 August 1662, Park was given the title of Prince Consort Geumpyeong (금평위; 錦平尉). At the age of 17 or 18, Princess Suknyeong then gave birth to a daughter named Park Hui-gyeong in 1667.

=== Death ===
The Princess died soon after; her husband died at the age 95, in 1747, during Yeongjo's reign. Her mother also outlived her by almost three decades and died in 1693.

In 1666, the 7th year of reign of King Hyojong, "Princess Suknyeong is dead" ("숙녕 옹주가 죽었다.") was recorded in the annals. But in 1668, the Princess was once again mentioned in the annals stating she died. It was speculated that the Princess died from the smallpox that had been affecting the palace grounds at that time. In the Joseon Annals, it states that there was an unclear statement on what exact date she died; which brought two different death dates but others say that 1668 is more acceptable since her daughter was born in 1667.

The Princess's tomb was firstly located in Sojeokseong-dong, Dong-myeon, Yangju, Gyeonggi Province and then moved to Songneung-ri, Jingeon-myeon, Namyangju, Gyeonggi Province.

== Family ==
- Father: Hyojong of Joseon (조선 효종왕; 3 July 1619 – 23 June 1659)
- Mother: Royal Noble Consort An of the Gyeongju Yi clan (안빈 이씨; September 1622 – October 1693)
- Husband: Park Pil-seong, Prince Consort Geumpyeong (박필성 금평위; 1652–1747)
- Issue
  - Daughter: Park Hui-gyeong, Lady Park of the Bannam Park clan (박희경; 朴喜慶; 1667–?)
