= Ji Eun-sung =

South Korean actor

- Born: August 3, 1991 (age 35); Gwangju, South Korea
- Other name: Ji Eun-seong
- Education: Gwangju University
- Occupation: Actor
- Years active: 2013–present
- Agent: SidusHQ

Korean name
- Hangul: 지은성
- Hanja: 池殷成
- RR: Ji Eunseong
- MR: Chi Ŭnsŏng

Ji Eun-sung (born August 3, 1991) is a South Korean actor. He is perhaps best known for his roles in the television series Shine or Go Crazy (2015) and Reverse (2017–2018).

== Filmography ==
=== Film ===
Year	Title	Role
2016	Detour	Joong-pil (young)

=== Television ===
Year	Title	Role
2013	Blooded Palace: The War of Flowers	Grand Prince Inpyeong
2014	The Three Musketeers	young Crown Prince Sohyeon
2014	A Mother's Choice	Oh Jin-wook
2015	Shine or Go Crazy	Wang Won
2015	The Ace	Kim Joon
2015	Never Die	Lee Jung-hoon
2016	My Mind's Flower Rain	Park Sun-ho
2016	Nightmare Teacher	Ko Ki-tae
2017	Reverse	Kim Jae-min
2017	Listen to Her Heart	Jae-hyung
2019	My Country: The New Age	Yi Bang-won (young)
