= Consort An =

Consort An may refer to:

- Consort Dowager An (died 949), Shi Chonggui's mother
- Royal Consort Jeongbi An (died 1428), consort of Gongmin of Goryeo
- Royal Consort Anbin Yi (1622–1693), concubine of Hyojong of Joseon

== See also ==
- Wang Baoming (455–512), posthumous name Empress An, Xiao Zhaoye's mother
