= Tongju Yang clan =

Korean clan from Beijing, China

- Country: Korea
- Current region: Tongzhou District, Beijing
- Founder: Yang Bok gil

The Tongju Yang clan (Korean: 통주 양씨; Hanja: 通州 楊氏) was a Korean clan. Their bon-gwan was in Tongzhou District, Beijing, China. According to research in 2000, members of the clan numbered 83. Their founder was Yang Bok gil, who was from Tongzhou District, Beijing. Yang Bok gil called volunteer soldiers together hoping for the restoration of the Ming dynasty when the Ming dynasty was toppled by the Qing dynasty; however, he was captured and was detained in Shenyang. After that, Crown Prince Sohyeon returned to Joseon with nine people who were captured by the Qing dynasty after the Qing invasion of Joseon. They hoped for the Ming dynasty's restoration and raised a rebellion but were detained by the Qing dynasty.

== See also ==
- Korean clan names of foreign origin
