= Anbin Yi =

Korean royal consort (1622–1693)

- Royal Consort of the Senior First Rank
- Born: 1622; Joseon
- Died: 20 November 1693 (aged 71); Joseon
- Burial: Anbinmyo, Namyangju, South Korea
- Consort of: King Hyojong
- Issue Detail: 1 daughter
- Clan: Gyeongju Yi (by birth); Jeonju Yi (by marriage)
- Dynasty: Yi
- Father: Yi Eung-heon

Korean name
- Hangul: 안빈 이씨
- Hanja: 安嬪 李氏
- RR: Anbin Issi
- MR: Anbin Issi

Anbin Yi (Korean: 안빈 이씨; Hanja: 安嬪 李氏; 1622 – 20 November 1693), or Concubine An, (Note: The literal translation of bin (빈; 嬪) is "concubine". Combined with the honorific title an (안; 安), the full meaning is "Peaceful Concubine".) of the Gyeongju Yi clan, was a consort of King Hyojong, the 17th monarch of Joseon.

== Biography ==
=== Early life and lineage ===
Lady Yi was born during the reign of Gwanghaegun. Her father was Yi Eung-heon (이응헌), who served as assistant vice minister of works (공조 참의), while her mother is unidentified.

=== As royal consort ===
Lady Yi became King Hyojong's concubine before he rose to the position of crown prince. In 1637, she followed then-Grand Prince Bongrim and Grand Princess Consort Pungan (posthumously Queen Inseon) to Mukden after they had been taken as hostages in accordance with the peace treaty that ended the Qing invasion.

In 1649, Lady Yi gave birth to her only child, Princess Suknyeong. King Hyojong acceded to the throne that same year, but Lady Yi didn't become an official royal consort until 1656, when she was appointed to the junior fourth rank (숙원; sugwon), the lowest rank for the king's consorts. A theory is that this happened because she shared the surname of the royal house, despite different clan origins — she came from the Gyeongju Yi clan (경주 이씨), whereas the royal family was a branch of the Jeonju Yi clan — and this reason seems plausible, as people bearing the "Yi" surname were originally forbidden from participating in the selection process for queens, princesses consort, princes consort and royal consorts (former palace ladies who were favored by the king didn't face this prohibition).

Lady Yi's lifestyle was reportedly substandard during Hyojong's reign, with her living expenses being limited, but her treatment improved rapidly after King Hyeonjong took the throne. In 1661, she was first raised to the junior third rank (숙용; sugyong), then to the second junior rank (숙의; sugui) a few months later. In the intervening years, she was promoted to the junior first rank (귀인; gwiin), before being elevated in 1686 to the senior first rank (빈; bin), with the honorific title an (安), meaning "peace". The last promotion was in recognition of her merit in accompanying Hyojong during his captivity in Qing. King Sukjong, the grandson of King Hyojong and Queen Inseon, highly valued Lady Yi because of this service.

=== Death ===
Lady Yi died at the age of 71, having survived King Hyojong by 34 years, and also outlived her daughter, who had died 25 years earlier due to smallpox. She was buried in present-day Namyangju, Gyeonggi Province. The site is known as Anbinmyo (안빈묘).

== Titles ==
- During the reign of Gwanghaegun (r. 1608–1623):
  - Lady, of the Gyeongju Yi clan (경주 이씨; 慶州李氏; from 1622)
    - Yi Eung-heon's daughter (이응헌의 딸)
    - Lady Yi (이씨; 李氏)
- During the reign of King Injo (r. 1623–1649):
  - Grand Prince Bongrim's concubine (봉림대군의 첩; from unknown date)
  - Crown Prince's concubine (왕세자의 첩; from 1645)
- During the reign of King Hyojong (r. 1649–1659):
  - Sugwon (Note: lit. ''Lady of Warm Beauty'') (숙원; 淑媛; from 1656), royal consort of the junior fourth rank
- During the reign of King Hyeonjong (r. 1659–1674):
  - Sugyong (Note: lit. ''Lady of Warm Countenance'') (숙용; 淑容; 1 September 1661), royal consort of the junior third rank
  - Sugui (Note: lit. ''Lady of Warm Deportment'') (숙의; 淑儀; from 11 December 1661), royal consort of the junior second rank
  - Gwiin (Note: lit. ''Noble Lady'') (귀인; 貴人; from unknown date), royal consort of the junior first rank
- During the reign of King Sukjong (r. 1674–1720):
  - Concubine An (안빈; 安嬪; from 27 May 1686), royal consort of the senior first rank

== Family ==
- Father: Yi Eung-heon (이응헌)
- Mother: Lady, of a certain clan (모씨)
- Consort of: King Hyojong (효종대왕; 3 July 1619 – 23 June 1659)
- Issue
  - Princess Suknyeong (숙녕옹주; 1649 – 28 June 1668)

== See also ==
- History of Korea
- Styles and titles in Joseon
