= Queen Jangnyeol =

Queen of Joseon from 1639 to 1649

Grand Queen Dowager of Joseon
- Tenure: 23 June 1659 – 20 September 1688
- Predecessor: Grand Queen Dowager Soseong
- Successor: Grand Queen Dowager Hyesun

Queen Dowager of Joseon
- Tenure: 17 June 1649 – 23 June 1659
- Predecessor: Queen Dowager Soseong
- Successor: Queen Dowager Hyosuk

Queen Consort of Joseon
- Tenure: 3 January 1639 – 17 June 1649
- Predecessor: Queen Inyeol
- Successor: Queen Inseon
- Born: 16 December 1624; Jiksan-hyeon, Chungcheong Province, Joseon
- Died: 20 September 1688 (aged 63); Naebanwon, Changgyeonggung, Hanseong, Joseon
- Burial: Hwireung, Donggureung Cluster, Guri, South Korea
- Spouse: King Injo (m. 1639; died 1649)
Regnal name
- Jaui Gongsin Hwiheon Kangin (자의공신휘헌강인; 慈懿恭愼徽獻康仁) (Note: Known as honorific name (존호; 尊號) in the Sinosphere, its closest equivalent in the English-speaking world is the regnal name.)
Posthumous name
- Queen Sukmok Jeongsuk Onhye Jangnyeol (숙목정숙온혜장렬왕후; 淑穆貞淑溫惠莊烈王后)
- Clan: Yangju Jo (by birth); Jeonju Yi (by marriage)
- Dynasty: Yi
- Father: Jo Chang-won, Internal Prince Hanwon
- Mother: Internal Princess Consort Wansan, of the Jeonju Choe clan

Korean name
- Hangul: 장렬왕후
- Hanja: 莊烈王后
- RR: Jangnyeol wanghu
- MR: Changnyŏl wanghu

Queen Jangnyeol (Korean: 장렬왕후; Hanja: 莊烈王后; 16 December 1624 – 20 September 1688), of the Yangju Jo clan, was the second wife of King Injo, the 16th monarch of Joseon. She was queen of Joseon from 1639 until her husband's death in 1649, and was then styled as Queen Dowager Jaui during the reign of her stepson, King Hyojong, and as Grand Queen Dowager Jaui during the reign of her stepgrandson, King Hyeonjong, and that of her step-great-grandson, King Sukjong.

== Biography ==
=== Early life and lineage ===
The future Queen Jangnyeol was born during the reign of King Injo, as the youngest child among one son and three daughters. Her father was Jo Chang-won (조창원) and her mother was a lady from the Jeonju Choe clan (전주 최씨).

=== As queen ===
In 1639, shortly after her 14th birthday, Lady Jo became the second wife of King Injo. He was her senior by 29 years and already had three legitimate sons from his first marriage to Queen Inyeol; Lady Jo's new stepsons were all older than herself and had children of their own. (Note: The first child of Grand Prince Inpyeong was born two months after the marriage.)

By the time Lady Jo entered the palace, Gwiin Jo had already monopolized Injo's favor and without the strict oversight of the late Queen Inyeol, she was able to wield great power in the internal court and engage in scheming, often sowing discord between Lady Jo and the king according to rumors. As a result, the royal couple's marital relationship was tense and Lady Jo's status as queen was a mere façade. In 1645, she left the main palace, Changdeokgung, and moved to Gyeongdeokgung in the west.

Because of her lack of offspring and failure to establish a power base during her tenure as queen, Lady Jo was later unable to exercise authority as queen dowager and grand queen dowager. Nevertheless, she lived a relatively stable life and became a respected elder during her five decades in the palace. Looking at the case of Queen Inmok and Grand Prince Yeongchang, giving birth to a son might have instead put her in a precarious position.

=== Widowhood and later life ===
King Injo died in 1649 and was succeeded by his second son, Yi Ho (posthumously King Hyojong). Lady Jo thus became queen dowager at the age of 24, receiving the honorific name Jaui (자의; lit. ''kind and exemplary''). Ten years later, she was elevated to grand queen dowager following the death of King Hyojong and the accession to the throne of his only son, Yi Yeon (posthumously King Hyeonjong).

Subsequently, the Yesong Controversy (예송논쟁) arose as the rival Westerners and Southerners clashed over how long Lady Jo should wear mourning garments (상복) for her stepson. The issue was later revived upon the death of King Hyojong's wife, Queen Inseon, in 1674. Under Confucian ritual laws, a parent was to observe a longer mourning period for an eldest son than for a second son. Because Hyojong had been King Injo's second son — becoming his father's heir only after Crown Prince Sohyeon died — scholars debated whether Hyojong should be treated as a second son or as the proper successor to the throne; the Westerners led by Song Si-yeol argued for the one year and nine months theory, whereas the Southerners argued for the three years and one year theory. The dispute ultimately escalated into a major political and ideological conflict over royal legitimacy and government dominance, as well as a struggle between royal authority and the scholar-official class, reshaping factional alignments and deepening the political division that defined the middle and late Joseon period.

Lady Jo spent the rest of her life in solitude and eventually saw the enthronement of her step-great-grandson, Yi Sun (posthumously King Sukjong), who was her junior by less than 37 years.

=== Death ===
Lady Jo died three months before her 64th birthday, having survived King Injo by 39 years. She was buried within Hwireung (휘릉), today part of the Donggureung Cluster in Guri, Gyeonggi Province.

== Titles ==
- During the reign of King Injo (r. 1623–1649):
  - Lady, of the Yangju Jo clan (양주 조씨; 楊州趙氏; from 16 December 1624)
    - Jo Chang-won's daughter (조창원의 딸)
    - Lady Jo (조씨; 趙氏)
  - Queen (왕비; 王妃; from 3 January 1639)
- During the reign of King Hyojong (r. 1649–1659):
  - Queen Dowager Jaui (자의왕대비; 慈懿王大妃; from 17 June 1649)
- During the reign of King Hyeonjong (r. 1659–1674):
  - Grand Queen Dowager Jaui (자의대왕대비; 慈懿大王大妃; from 23 June 1659)
- During the reign of King Sukjong (r. 1674–1720):
  - Queen Jangnyeol (장렬왕후; 莊烈王后; from 1688)

== Family ==
- Father: Jo Chang-won (조창원), Internal Prince Hanwon (한원부원군; 1583–1646)
- Mother: Internal Princess Consort Wansan (완산부부인), of the Jeonju Choe clan (전주 최씨; 1583–1663)
- Sibling(s)
  - Lady, of the Yangju Jo clan (양주 조씨; 1607–?); given name Su-im (조수임) (Note: Married Shin Ik-jeon (신익전; 1605–1660) from the Pyongsan Shin clan (평산 신씨); second son of Chief State Councilor Shin Heum (신흠; 1566–1628) and brother-in-law of Princess Jeongsuk (정숙옹주; third daughter of King Seonjo). They had issue (5 sons, 3 daughters); including Princess Consort Yeongpung (영풍군부인; 1639–1692), the wife of King Injo's seventh son, Prince Sungseon (숭선군; 1639–1690).)
  - Jo Yun-seok (조윤석; 1615–1664) (Note: ▪︎1st wife: Lady, of the Daegu Seo clan (대구 서씨); daughter of Seo Gyeong-bin (서경빈). ▪︎2nd wife: Lady, of the (new) Andong Kim clan (신 안동 김씨); daughter of Kim Su-in (김수인) and first cousin once removed of Queen Inseon. ▪︎Issue: 1 son, 5 daughters.)
  - Lady, of the Yangju Jo clan (양주 조씨; 1623–?); given name Jong-im (조종임) (Note: Married Han Jeong-sang (한정상) from the Cheongju Han clan (청주 한씨).)
- Husband: King Injo (인조대왕; 7 December 1595 – 17 June 1649) — No issue.
  - Father-in-law: King Wonjong (원종대왕; 12 August 1580 – 23 January 1620)
  - Mother-in-law: Queen Inheon (인헌왕후), of the Neungseong Gu clan (능성 구씨; 2 June 1578 – 10 February 1626)

== Ancestry ==
Ancestors of Queen Jangnyeol

Jo Jun-su (조준수)
Jo Ram (조람)
Lady, of the Yi clan (이씨)
Jo Jon-seong (조존성)
Yi Mong-gyu (이몽규)
Lady, of the Gyeongju Yi clan (경주 이씨)
Lady, of the Kim clan (김씨)
Jo Chang-won, Internal Prince Hanwon (한원부원군 조창원)
Yi Jeup (이즙)
Yi Sin-chung (이신충)
Lady, of the Yongin Yi clan (용인 이씨)
Queen Jangnyeol
Choe Hui-jeung (최희증)
Choe Yeok (최역)
Choe Cheol-gyeon (최철견)
Yi Seok (이석)
Lady, of the Jeonju Yi clan (전주 이씨)
Internal Princess Consort Wansan, of the Jeonju Choe clan (완산부부인 전주 최씨)
Jeong Se-gu (정세구)
Jeong Yun-bung (정윤붕)
Lady, of the Jinju Jeong clan (진주 정씨)

== In popular culture ==
- Portrayed by Kang Soo-yeon and Jo Eun-deok in the 1981 KBS1 TV series Daemyeong.
- Portrayed by Jeon Mi-seon in the 1986–1987 MBC TV series 500 Years of Joseon: Namhan Mountain Fortress.
- Portrayed by Jung Hye-sun in 1988 MBC TV series 500 Years of Joseon: Queen Inhyeon.
- Portrayed by Kim Yeong-ae in 1995 SBS TV series Jang Hee Bin.
- Portrayed by Kang Boo-ja in the 2002–2003 KBS2 TV series Royal Story: Jang Hui-bin.
- Portrayed by Go Won-hee in the 2013 JTBC TV series Blooded Palace: The War of Flowers.
- Portrayed by Lee Hyo-chun in the 2013 SBS TV series Jang Ok-jung, Living by Love.
- Portrayed by Chae Bin in the 2015 MBC TV series Splendid Politics.

== See also ==
- History of Korea
- Political factions of Joseon
- Styles and titles in Joseon

== Notes ==
Queen Jangnyeol Yangju Jo clan
Royal titles
| Preceded by Queen Inyeol of the Cheongju Han clan | Queen Consort of Joseon; 1639–1649 | Succeeded by Queen Inseon of the Deoksu Jang clan |
| Preceded by Queen Dowager Soseong of the Yonan Kim clan | Queen Dowager of Joseon; 1649–1659 | Succeeded by Queen Dowager Hyosuk of the Deoksu Jang clan |
| Preceded by Grand Queen Dowager Soseong of the Yonan Kim clan | Grand Queen Dowager of Joseon; 1659–1688 | Succeeded by Grand Queen Dowager Hyesun of the Gyeongju Kim clan |
