= The Three Musketeers (South Korean TV series) =

2014 South Korean television series

- Promotional poster
- Genre: Period drama Action; Romance; Drama; Political
- Based on: The Three Musketeers by Alexandre Dumas
- Written by: Song Jae-jeong
- Directed by: Kim Byung-soo
- Starring: Jung Yong-hwa; Lee Jin-wook; Yang Dong-geun; Jung Hae-in; Seo Hyun-jin
- Country of origin: South Korea
- Original language: Korean language
- No. of episodes: 12

Production
- Production companies: Chorokbaem Media; JS Pictures

Original release
- Network: tvN
- Release: August 17 – November 2, 2014

The Three Musketeers (Korean: 삼총사; RR: Samchongsa) is a 2014 South Korean television series starring Jung Yong-hwa, Lee Jin-wook, Yang Dong-geun, Jung Hae-in, and Seo Hyun-jin. Loosely based on Alexandre Dumas's 1844 novel The Three Musketeers, the series follows three Joseon-era adventurers who serve Crown Prince Sohyeon as his warrior guards. It aired on cable channel tvN from August 17 to November 2, 2014 on Sundays at 21:00 for 12 episodes.

The Three Musketeers was originally planned for three seasons with a budget of US$10 million (12 episodes per season), with the last season to be filmed in China. But with low viewership ratings for its first season, plans for succeeding seasons have been postponed indefinitely.

== Cast ==
- Jung Yong-hwa as Park Dal-hyang (based on d'Artagnan)
  - Park Chang-ik as young Dal-hyang
- Lee Jin-wook as Crown Prince Sohyeon (based on Athos)
  - Jung Taek-hyun as child Sohyeon
  - Ji Eun-sung as young Sohyeon
- Yang Dong-geun as Heo Seung-po (based on Porthos)
  - Kim Joo-seung as young Seung-po
- Jung Hae-in as Ahn Min-seo (based on Aramis)
  - Lee Joo-chan as young Min-seo
- Seo Hyun-jin as Kang Yoon-seo (based on Anne of Austria)
  - Park So-young as young Yoon-seo
- Yoo In-young as Jo Mi-ryung (based on Milady de Winter)
- Kim Myung-soo as King Injo (based on Louis XIII)
- Park Yeong-gyu as Kim Ja-jeom (based on Cardinal Richelieu)
- Jeon No-min as Choe Myeong-gil (based on de Tréville)
- Lee Kyun as Pansoe (based on Planchet)
- Kim Sung-min as Inggūldai (based on Duke of Buckingham)
- Park Sung-min as Noh Soo (based on Comte de Rochefort)
- Kang Ki-young as Ba-rang
- Kim Seo-kyung as Ma Boo-dae
- Jung Yoo-suk as Park Ji-won
- Woo Hyun as Dal-hyang's father
- Byun Joo-hyun as Hong Taiji
- Han Min as Princess Jeongmyeong

== Ratings ==
In this table, the blue numbers represent the lowest ratings and the red numbers represent the highest ratings.

Ep.	Original broadcast date	Title	Average audience share
Ep.	Original broadcast date	Title	AGB Nielsen
Ep.	Original broadcast date	Title	Nationwide
1	August 17, 2014	First Encounter	1.820%
2	August 24, 2014	The Three Musketeers	1.386%
3	August 31, 2014	Secret Mission	1.461%
4	September 7, 2014	Protect the Neck of Enemy General Ingguldai	0.987%
5	September 14, 2014	A Duel	1.088%
6	September 21, 2014	Commander Kim Ja-jeom	1.007%
7	September 28, 2014	Mi-ryung and Hyang-sun	1.157%
8	October 5, 2014	The Crown Princess' Desire	0.794%
9	October 12, 2014	Immediate Execution	1.030%
10	October 19, 2014	One for All, All for One	1.370%
11	October 26, 2014	Kiss	1.758%
12	November 2, 2014	Letter from Mainland	1.960%
Average			1.318%

- This drama airs on a cable channel/pay TV which normally has a relatively smaller audience compared to free-to-air TV/public broadcasters (KBS, SBS, MBC and EBS).
