= Daemyeong =

1981 South Korean television series

- Genre: Historical
- Screenplay by: Lee Chul-hyang
- Starring: Kim Dong-hoon; Kim Heung-ki; Seo Young-jin; Won Mi-kyung; Kim Sung-won; Baek Il-sub
- Country of origin: South Korea
- Original language: Korean
- No. of seasons: 1
- No. of episodes: 52 (50 mains and 2 specials)

Production
- Producer: Go Sung-won

Original release
- Network: KBS1
- Release: January 5 – December 28, 1981

Daemyeong (Korean: 대명; Hanja: 大命; RR: Daemyeong; MR: Taemyŏng) is a 1981 South Korean television series starring Kim Dong-hoon, Kim Heung-ki, Seo Young-jin, Won Mi-kyung, Kim Sung-won and Baek Il-sub. It aired on KBS1 from January 5, 1981 until December 28, 1981 every Mondays for 52 episodes.

== Cast ==
=== Main ===
- Kim Dong-hoon as King Injo
- Kim Heung-ki as King Hyojong
- Seo Young-jin as King Hyeonjong
- Won Mi-kyung as Queen Inseon, King Hyojong's wife and King Hyeonjong's mother.
- Kim Sung-won as Chief State Councilor Choi Myung-kil
- Baek Il-sub as General Im Kyung-up

=== Supporting ===
==== Peoples in Joseon dynasty ====
Royal Household

- Seo Woo-rim as Queen Inyul, King Injo's first wife and King Hyojong's mother.
- Kang Soo-yeon as Queen Jangnyul, King Injo's second wife.
  - Jo Eun-duk as young Queen Jangnyul
- Baek Yoon-sik as Crown Prince Sohyun, King Hyojong's big brother. He is King Injo and Queen Inyul's oldest son.
- Lee Min-hee as Crown Princess Consort Kang, Crown Prince Sohyun's wife.
- Choi Woo-sung as Grand Prince Inpyung, Crown Prince Sohyeon and King Hyojong's little brother. He is King Injo and Queen Inyul's third son.
- Yoon Yoo-sun as Grand Princess Consort Bookchun, Grand Prince Inpyung's wife.

Ministers, nobles and maids

- Lee Chi-woo as Kim-Ryoo
- Im Dong-jin as Left State Councillor Kim Sang-hun
- Nam Sung-woo as Jung Choong-shin
- Jeon-Woon as Hong Ik-han
- Moon Oh-jang as Lee-Wan
- Nam Il-woo as Oh Dal-je
- Jang-Yong as Yoon-Jip
- Joo-Hyun as General Won Doo-pyo
- Kim Soon-chul as Kim Ja-jum
- Kim Sung-kyum as Lee Shi-baek
- Kim Jin-hae as Jang-Yoo
- Hwang Bum-shik as Kim Kyung-jing
- Ahn Hyung-shik as Song Shi-yul
- Kim Shi-won as a Military officer in Pyongyang Fortress
- Lee Soon-jae as Left State Councillor Nam Yi-woong
- Yoon Duk-yong as Park-Ro
- Yang Young-joon as Hong Su-bong
- Moon Chang-kil as Jung Noe-kyung
- Park Moon-sup as Park Bae-won
- Park Yong-shik as Jo-Yang
- Song Hee-nam as Shin Jin-ik
- Jang Soon-kook as Jang Sa-min
- Kang Min-ho as Kang Koon-kwan
- Choi Jung-hoon as Kong Ma-kak
- Sa Mi-ja as Ha Joong-wol
- Lee Kyung-jin as Ok-Hwa
- Seonu Eun-sook as Keum-Nyeo
- Seo Seung-hee as Mae-Hwan
  - Ha Mi-hye as young Mae-Hwan
- Kim Mi-young as Song-Hwa
- Kwon Ki-sun as Yang Hwa-dang
- Lee Dae-ro as Lee Kyung-suk
- Song Chang-shin as Kim-Yook
- Lee Jong-man as Eunuch Kim
- Park Hyun-jung as Court Lady Park
- Lee Sung-woong as a Buddhist in Dokbo
- Go Kwang-woo as a Military officer
- Nam Yoon-jung as an Officer (참판)

==== Peoples in Qing dynasty ====
- Kim Yoon-hyung as Emperor Soongduk (숭덕제; Sungdeokje)
- Im Byung-ki as Imperial Prince Junghun (정헌친왕; Jeongheonchinwang), Emperor Soongduk's half nephew.
- Yoo Jong-keun as Imperial Prince Yechoong (예충친왕; Yechungchinwang), Emperor Soongduk's half little brother.
- Lee Young as Tatara Inggūldai (용골대; Yonggoldae)
- Lee Shin-jae as an officer (예부상서; Yebusangseo)
- Maeng Ho-rim
- Lee Han-soo
- Ha Dae-kyung as a horseman
- Kim Yoo-haeng as Wang Jang-soo
- Joo Sun-tae as Wang-Choong
- Heo Wook-sook as Lady Jin
- Seonu Yong-nyu as Lady Yoo

==== Peoples in Ming dynasty ====
- Seo Young-jin as Emperor Soongjung
- Lee Keun-hee as Great King Joo Yoo-soong
- Lee Yil-woong as Jung Myung-soo

=== Other ===
- Park Kyoo-shik
- Jung Rae-hyup
- Kim Hae-kwon
- Lee Seung-ho
- Yoo Soon-chul
- Kwak Kyung-hwan
- Jung Hae-chang
- Park Jung-woong
- Choi Myung-soo
- Min Ji-hwan
- Park Byung-ho
- Min Wook
- Kim In-tae
- Kim Jong-kyul
- Hong Young-ja
- Ahn Hae-sook
- Kim Bong-keun
- Jang Hak-soo
- Seo Sang-ik
- Kim Nan-young
- Park Young-mok
- Nam Sung-shik
- Jung Woon-yong
- Park Hae-sang
- Jo Jae-hoon
- Song Jong-won
- Ki Jung-soo
- Kang Tae-ki
- Kim Byung-ki
- Ahn Byung-kyung
- Yoo Dong-keun
- Ji Mi-ok
- Lee Duk-hee
- Jung Jong-joon
- Chou Seung-chul
- Song Bo-young
- Song Dong-sup
- Song Suk-ho
- Choi Sang-il
- Oh Joong-hoon

== Episodes ==
Episodes	Airing dates	Titles
1	January 5, 1981	FIRST EPISODE; Archer Prince (백궁왕자)
2	January 12, 1981	A Big Stars that Falls (큰별 떨어지다)
3	January 19, 1981	A Drum (북소리)
4	January 26, 1981	All the Womens (여인들)
5	February 2, 1981	The Wind From The Northwest (서북풍)
6	February 9, 1981	The Wind that Blows Incessantly (봉풍은 무삼일고)
7	February 16, 1981	-
8	February 23, 1981	The Eve of Bloodshed (혈풍전야)
9	March 2, 1981	Namhan Mountain Fortress (남한산성)
10	March 9, 1981	What Will You Do, Your Majesty? (전하 어찌하오리까?)
11	March 16, 1981	The Ganghwa Island (강화도)
12	March 23, 1981	The Wind Blows (놀개바람)
13	March 30, 1981	Surrender at Kanghwa Island (강화도 함락)
14	April 6, 1981	-
15	April 13, 1981	-
16	April 27, 1981	The Cheonchu (천추)
17	May 4, 1981	The Time of North Wind (북풍세월)
18	May 11, 1981	Furious Mountains and Rivers (분노의 산하)
19	May 18, 1981	Those Who Leave (떠나가는 사람들)
20	May 25, 1981	Treacherous Cliffs at Cheongseokryeong (청석령 험한고개)
21	June 1, 1981	-
22	June 8, 1981	The Souls of This Life (이승의 심은 넑)
23	June 15, 1981	Missing My Homeland (사향곡)
24	June 22, 1981	The Irwon Province (일월도)
25	June 29, 1981	Where is The East? (동녘이 어드메뇨?)
26	July 6, 1981	A Single Heart (일편단심)
27	July 13, 1981	The Maekbak (맥박)
28	July 20, 1981	Ganora: The Three Mountains (가노라 삼자산아)
29	July 27, 1981	? (깊은골 푸른이끼)
30	August 4, 1981	The Sky and Earth (하늘과 땅)
31	August 10, 1981	A Breeze (들바람)
32	August 17, 1981	My Strong Country (내강산 내조국)
33	August 24, 1981	Hurray! (만세록)
34	August 31, 1981	The Sound of Flower (꽃이 피는 소리)
35	September 7, 1981	The Iron Tower (무쇠탑)
36	September 14, 1981	Fallen Flowers (낙화)
37	September 21, 1981	Horay! (만세문)
38	September 28, 1981	The Throne (왕좌)
39	October 5, 1981	The Scent (님의 향기)
40	October 12, 1981	Your Majesty (전하)
41	October 19, 1981	Your Majesty's General (천하대장군)
42	October 26, 1981	Princess Uisun (의순공주)
43	November 2, 1981	A Mace (철퇴)
44	November 9, 1981	A Raging Flames (성난불길)
45	November 16, 1981	A Day in Hanyang (한양의 아침)
46	November 23, 1981	The Heilongjiang (흑룡강)
47	November 30, 1981	Archer Queen (맥궁왕비)
48	December 7, 1981	The Second Sino-Russian Border Conflict (제2차 나선정벌)
49	December 14, 1981	Ah! Northern Conquest (아! 북벌)
50	December 28, 1981	LAST EPISODE Great King Hyojong (효종대왕)
