= Secret Royal Inspector & Joy =

2021 South Korean television series

- Promotional poster
- Also known as: Inspector Joy; Secret Royal Inspector Joy
- Hangul: 어사와 조이
- RR: Eosawa Joi
- MR: Ŏsawa Choi
- Genre: Historical drama; Comedy
- Created by: tvN
- Developed by: Kim Young-Kyu; Studio Dragon
- Written by: Lee Jae-yoon
- Directed by: Yoo Jong-seon
- Starring: Ok Taec-yeon; Kim Hye-yoon
- Composer: Dalpalan (music manager)
- Country of origin: South Korea
- Original language: Korean
- No. of episodes: 16

Production
- Executive producers: Jeon Heung-man; Kim Ryun-hee; Kim Ki-tae (CP)
- Producers: Yoo Byung-suk; Lee Ji-min; Kim Chang-su; Park Yoo-jung
- Running time: 60 minutes
- Production companies: Studio Dragon; Mongjakso

Original release
- Network: tvN
- Release: November 8 – December 28, 2021

Secret Royal Inspector & Joy (Korean: 어사와 조이) is a 2021 South Korean television series starring Ok Taec-yeon and Kim Hye-yoon. It aired on tvN from November 8 to December 28, 2021. It is also available for streaming on iQIYI and Viu in selected territories.

== Synopsis ==
Set in the Joseon period, it tells the story of a young gourmet who unintentionally becomes a royal inspector and a divorced woman who rushes to find happiness, as they team up to investigate and expose corrupt politicians.

== Cast ==
=== Main ===
- Ok Taec-yeon as Ra Ian, (Note: Korean: 라이언; Hanja: 羅二言) an intelligent and unmarried 6th grade public service worker who wishes to open a small dumpling shop, but ends up becoming a secret royal inspector.
- Kim Hye-yoon as Kim Joy, (Note: Korean: 김조이; Hanja: 金祚怡) a realist woman who is full of desire and passion, and believes that divorce can happen to anyone.

=== Supporting ===
==== People around Ra Ian ====
- Lee Joon-hyuk as Crown Prince Sohyeon
- Yang Hee-kyung as Madam Jo

==== People around Kim Joy ====
- Chae Won-bin as Hwang Bo-ri / Biryoung
- Nam Mi-jung as Jang Pat-sun
- Joo Jin-soo as Noh Chu-han

==== Secret royal investigators ====
- Min Jin-woong as Yook-chil
- Park Kang-seop as Goo-pal
- Lee Sang-hee as Kwang-soon

==== Gangbyeonsau ====
- Lee Jae-kyoon as Park Tae-seo
- Jung Soon-won as Cha Mal-jong
- Kim Hyun-joon as Ji Maeng-soo
- Park Shin-ah as Kang Han-gi

==== Rulers ====
- Jeong Bo-seok as Park Seung
- Jo Kwan-woo as King Injo
- Choi Tae-hwan as Park Do-soo

==== People in Kkori Island ====
- Bae Jong-ok as Deok-bong
- Ha Seung-jin as Ba-hoe

=== Extended ===
- Cha Yeop as Hong Seok-gi
- Kwon Oh-kyung

=== Special appearances ===
- Song Jong-ho as Jang Ki-wan
- Cha Hak-yeon as Choi Seung-yul

== Production ==
- The series is formerly known as Tale of the Secret Royal Inspector and Joy (어사조이뎐; Eosajoidyeon). It is one of tvN's 15th anniversary special projects.
- The lead roles were first offered to actors Jo Byeong-kyu and Jung So-min.

== Viewership ==
Secret Royal Inspector & Joy : South Korea viewers per episode (thousands)

Season	Episode number															
Season	1	2	3	4	5	6	7	8	9	10	11	12	13	14	15	16
1	1098	920	1075	1164	1085	887	947	980	987	1025	872	765	746	704	810	848

Source: Audience measurement performed nationwide by Nielsen Korea.

Average TV viewership ratings
Ep.	Original broadcast date	Average audience share (Nielsen Korea)	
Ep.	Original broadcast date	Nationwide	Seoul
1	November 8, 2021	4.961% (1st)	5.073% (1st)
2	November 9, 2021	4.035% (1st)	4.440% (1st)
3	November 15, 2021	5.257% (1st)	6.063% (1st)
4	November 16, 2021	5.050% (2nd)	5.495% (2nd)
5	November 22, 2021	4.514% (1st)	5.145% (1st)
6	November 23, 2021	4.249% (1st)	4.832% (1st)
7	November 29, 2021	3.912%(1st)	4.242%(1st)
8	November 30, 2021	4.332% (1st)	4.691% (1st)
9	December 6, 2021	4.471% (1st)	4.665% (1st)
10	December 7, 2021	4.624% (1st)	4.969% (1st)
11	December 13, 2021	3.653% (1st)	3.835% (1st)
12	December 14, 2021	3.410% (1st)	3.860% (1st)
13	December 20, 2021	3.403% (1st)	3.355% (1st)
14	December 21, 2021	3.236% (1st)	3.546% (1st)
15	December 27, 2021	3.592% (1st)	3.801% (1st)
16	December 28, 2021	3.799% (1st)	3.610% (1st)
Average		4.157%	4.476%
In the table above, the blue numbers represent the lowest ratings and the red numbers represent the highest ratings.; This series aired on a cable channel/pay TV which normally has a relatively smaller audience compared to free-to-air TV/public broadcasters (KBS, SBS, MBC and EBS).
