= Lee Chae-mi =

South Korean actress (born 2006)

- Born: June 23, 2006 (age 20); South Korea
- Occupation: Actress
- Years active: 2012–present

Korean name
- Hangul: 이채미
- RR: I Chaemi
- MR: I Ch'aemi

Lee Chae-mi (Korean: 이채미; born June 23, 2006) is a South Korean actress. She is best known for playing the daughter in need of a bone marrow transplant in the 2013 television series Two Weeks.

== Filmography ==
=== Television series ===
Year	Title	Role
2012	Still You	Na Mi-so
2013	Blooded Palace: The War of Flowers	Princess Hyomyeong (young)
2013	Crazy Love	Lee Hae-ram
2013	Two Weeks	Seo Soo-Jin
2013	Golden Rainbow	Kim Baek-won (child)
2013	One Warm Word	Kim Yoon-jung
2014	Lovers of Music	Sibling on the beach (ep.12)
2014	Diary of a Night Watchman	Do Ha (young)
2014	Plus Nine Boys	Jang Baek-ji
2015	Flower of Queen	Rena Jung (young)
2015	I Have a Lover	Baek Jo
2016	Monster	Park Ye-bin
2017	Teacher Oh Soon-Nam	Cha Joon-young
2017	The Lady in Dignity	Ahn Ji-hoo
2021	Hello, Me!	Go So-hye

=== Films ===
Year	Title	Role
2016	Life Risking Romance	Han Je-in (young)
