= Mongol language =

Mongol language may refer to:

- Languages of Central Asia:
  - Middle Mongol language, a Mongolic koiné language spoken in the Mongol Empire
  - Mongolian language, the official language of Mongolia
  - Mongolic languages, a group of languages spoken in East-Central Asia, mostly in Mongolia and surrounding areas
- Languages of Papua New Guinea:
  - Mwakai language (Mongol), a Ramu language of Papua New Guinea

== See also ==
- Mongols, a Central and Northern Asian ethno-linguistic group
- Mongo language, a Bantu language
