= Kim Chajŏm =

Joseon scholar-official (1588–1652)

Kim Chajŏm 김자점

Chief state councillor
- In office 1646 – 22 June 1649
- Preceded by: Kim Ryu
- Succeeded by: Yi Kyŏngsŏk

Left state councillor
- In office 3 April 1646 – 12 May 1646
- Preceded by: Hong Sŏbong
- Succeeded by: Kim Sanghyŏn
- In office 29 December 1643 – 10 April 1644
- Preceded by: Sim Kiwon
- Succeeded by: Sim Yŏl

Right state councillor
- In office 21 June 1643 – 14 January 1644
- Preceded by: Sim Kiwon
- Succeeded by: Yi Kyŏngyŏ

Personal details
- Born: 1588
- Died: 27 January 1652 (aged 63–64)
- Spouse(s): Lady Pyŏn of the Hwangju Pyŏn clan Unnamed woman Unnamed concubine
- Children: Kim Ryeon (son); Kim Sik (son); Kim Chŏng (son)
- Parents: Kim T'ak (father); Lady Yu of the Gigye Yu clan (mother)

Korean name
- Hangul: 김자점
- Hanja: 金自點
- RR: Gim Jajeom
- MR: Kim Chajŏm

Art name
- Hangul: 낙서
- Hanja: 洛西
- RR: Nakseo
- MR: Naksŏ

Courtesy name
- Hangul: 성지
- Hanja: 成之
- RR: Seongji
- MR: Sŏngji

Kim Chajŏm (Korean: 김자점; 1588 – 27 January 1652) was a Korean scholar-official of the Joseon dynasty period and Ming-Qing transition. He was one of the disciples of Sŏng Hon and came from the Andong Kim clan.

He was Joseon's chief state councillor from 1645 to 1650, and was an ancestor of Kim Ku, a famous Korean independence activist.

In 1646, threatened by the return of Im Gyeong-eop to the capital, Kim Chajŏm paid soldiers to assassinate Im Gyeong-eop.

== Family ==
- Father
  - Kim T'ak (김탁; 金琢)
- Mother
  - Lady Yu of the Gigye Yu clan (기계 유씨); Yu Hong's eldest daughter.
- Siblings
  - Older brother: Kim Chagyŏm (김자겸; 金自兼); died young
- Wives and children:
  - Lady Pyŏn of the Hwangju Pyŏn clan (황주 변씨) – No issue.
  - Unnamed woman
    - Son - Kim Ryŏn (김련; 金鍊; ?–1651)
    - Son - Kim Sik (김식; 金鉽; 1620–1651)
      - Grandson - Kim Seryŏng (김세룡; 金世龍; ?–1651)
        - Granddaughter-in-law - Princess Hyomyeong (효명옹주; 1637–1700)
    - Son - Kim Chŏng (김정, 金鋌; 1631–1651)
  - Unnamed concubine – No issue.

== In popular culture ==
- Portrayed by Kim Soon-chul in the 1981 KBS1 TV series Daemyeong.
- Portrayed by Kim Sung-chan in the 1995 KBS2 TV series West Palace.
- Portrayed by Park Geun-hyung in 2009 MBC TV series The Return of Iljimae.
- Portrayed by Kwon Tae-won in 2012 MBC TV series The King's Doctor.
- Portrayed by Jung Sung-mo in 2013 JTBC TV series Blooded Palace: The War of Flowers.
- Portrayed by Park Yeong-gyu in 2014 tvN TV series The Three Musketeers.
- Portrayed by Jo Min-ki in 2015 MBC TV series Splendid Politics.
- Portrayed by Yang Hyun-min in the 2021 MBN TV series Bossam: Steal the Fate.

== See also ==
- Hyojong of Joseon
- Injo of Joseon
- Kim Jip
- Injo coup
