= Princess Uisun =

Korean princess (1635–1662)

Princess Uisun 의순공주
- Born: Yi Ae-suk (이애숙); 1635; Joseon
- Died: 1662 (aged 26–27)
- Spouse: Dorgon (d. 1650); Bolo (d. 1652)
- House: House of Yi (by birth); Aisin Gioro (by marriage)
- Father: Yi Gye-yun, Prince Geumrim
- Mother: Lady Yu of the Munhwa Yu clan

Korean name
- Hangul: 이애숙
- Hanja: 李愛淑
- RR: I Aesuk
- MR: I Aesuk

Royal title
- Hangul: 의순공주
- Hanja: 義順公主
- RR: Uisun gongju
- MR: Ŭisun kongju

Princess Uisun (1635 (Note: Other sources say that her birthdate could possibly be 1620 instead.)–1662; birth name Yi Ae-suk) was a Joseon Royal Family member who became the adopted daughter of Hyojong of Joseon and Queen Inseon, so she could marry the Aisin Gioro prince Dorgon and later, prince Bolo.

== Biography ==
=== Background ===
Yi Ae-suk was born one of the four daughters and seven sons of Yi Gye-yun, himself a 4th great-grandson of Seongjong of Joseon, and a fourth cousin twice removed of Hyojong.

=== Political marriage ===
In 1650, Dorgon sent the minister of Ministry of Revenue, Gioro Bahana, as an emissary to the Joseon court, to forge an alliance with Hyojong of Joseon, asking the king to choose a suitable bride for him. The bride could be a daughter of either a royal family member or a subject. Bahana delivered the order from the prince regent and was told that as the king's daughter was only two years old, (Note: This was a lie. Although Hyojong's youngest daughter was indeed only two years old, she had five living elder sisters by the time, including Princess Sukan, who would marry later in the same year.) so he suggested that a female from the royal clan was a viable alternative; on the other hand, the king's ministers greatly opposed offering any of their daughters.

Twenty days later, Ae-suk was given the title Princess Uisun and her biological father, Yi Gye-yun, was gifted cloth and rice as reward. Nearly one month after her adoption as Hyojong's daughter, Princess Uisun left the palace at Hanseong, accompanied by 16 maids, a female physician, and her nursemaid. After her arrival in Beijing, Dorgon complained about the appearance of his new wife and her court maids, saying that he even doubted the loyalty of Joseon. Merely seven months later, Dorgon died in the same year. Princess Uisun was asked to remarry one of Dorgon's nephews, his general Prince Bolo of the Second Rank, but he died in 1652.

=== Return to Korea ===
In the winter of 1655, Yi Gye-yun was dispatched as part of a diplomatic party to Beijing. Yi presented tribute and was entertained at a feast, during which he wept and petitioned for Princess Uisun to return to Korea, and his wish was granted. Princess Uisun returned to Joseon in the summer of 1656; on her return, Hyojong granted the princess a monthly pension to support her for the rest of her life. Yi Gye-yun's decision to request her return without consulting the king beforehand, however, received severe criticism from other court officials; under pressure from the court, Yi Gye-yun lost his official position after a series of impeachments.

Princess Uisun died of an illness in 1662 and her burial rites were provided for by Hyeonjong of Joseon, who described her fate as pitiable.

== Family ==
- Father: Yi Gye-yun, Prince Geumrim (이계윤 금림군), 4th generation descendant of the Joseon royal house by Seongjong of Joseon
  - Adoptive father: Hyojong of Joseon (3 July 1619 – 23 June 1659)
- Mother: Lady Yu of the Munhwa Yu clan
  - Adoptive mother: Queen Inseon of the Deoksu Jang clan (1618–1674)
- Siblings
  - Older brother - Yi Jun (이준; 李浚)
  - Older brother - Yi Su (이수; 李洙)
  - Older brother - Yi Hae (이해; 李海)
- Husband:
1. Aisin Gioro Dorgon, Prince Rui of the First Rank (多爾袞; 17 November 1612 – 31 December 1650)
2. Aisin Gioro Bolo, Prince Duanzhong of the First Rank (博洛; 1613 – 23 April 1652)
