= The King's Doctor =

2012 South Korean television series

- Promotional poster
- Also known as: Horse Doctor; The Horse Healer
- Hangul: 마의
- Hanja: 馬醫
- RR: Maui
- MR: Maŭi
- Genre: Historical; Medical drama
- Written by: Kim Yi-young
- Directed by: Lee Byung-hoon; Choi Jung-gyu
- Starring: Cho Seung-woo; Lee Yo-won
- Composers: Kim Joon-seok; Jung Se-rin
- Country of origin: South Korea
- Original language: Korean
- No. of episodes: 50

Production
- Cinematography: Kim Young-cheol; Kim Hyeong-geun
- Running time: 70 minutes
- Production companies: Kim Jong-hak Production; AStory

Original release
- Network: Munhwa Broadcasting Corporation
- Release: October 1, 2012 – March 25, 2013

The King's Doctor (Korean: 마의; RR: Maui; lit. 'Horse Doctor') is a 2012 South Korean television series depicting Baek Gwang-hyeon (1625–1697), Joseon Dynasty veterinarian, starring Cho Seung-woo and Lee Yo-won. It aired on MBC from October 1, 2012 to March 25, 2013 on Mondays and Tuesdays at 21:55 for 50 episodes. The historical/period epic drama commemorated MBC's 51st anniversary.

Filmed at MBC Dramia in Gyeonggi Province, The King's Doctor was directed by Lee Byung-hoon, known for his previous works Hur Jun, Jewel in the Palace, Yi San and Dong Yi. This marked the first television drama for actor Cho Seung-woo in his 13-year film and stage career.

== Plot ==
The life of a Joseon-era low-class veterinarian specializing in the treatment of horses, who rises to become the royal physician in charge of the King's health.

== Cast ==
=== Main characters ===
- Cho Seung-woo as Baek Kwang-hyun
  - Ahn Do-gyu as young Kwang-hyun
- Lee Yo-won as Kang Ji-nyeong
  - Roh Jeong-eui as young Ji-nyeong/Young-dal
- Son Chang-min as Lee Myung-hwan
- Yoo Sun as Jang In-joo
- Lee Sang-woo as Lee Sung-ha
  - Nam Da-reum as young Lee Sung-ha
- Lee Soon-jae as Ko Joo-man
- Han Sang-jin as King Hyeonjong
- Kim So-eun as Princess Sukhwi
- Jo Bo-ah as Seo Eun-seo

=== Supporting characters ===
- Kang Ki-young as Horse Doctor
- Kim Chang-wan as Jung Sung-jo
- Jeon No-min as Kang Do-joon, Kwang-hyun's father
- Choi Su-rin as Joo In-ok
- Kim Hye-sun as Queen Inseon
- Lee Hee-do as Choo Ki-bae
- Maeng Sang-hoon as Oh Jang-bak
- Ahn Sang-tae as Ja-bong
- In Gyo-jin as Kwon Suk-chul
- Jang Hee-woong as Yoon Tae-joo
- Yoon Bong-gil as Park Dae-mang
- Choi Beom-ho as Jo Jung-chul
- Shin Gook as Shin Byung-ha
- Ahn Yeo-jin as Court Lady Kwak
- Lee Kwan-hoon as Ma Do-heum
- Lee Ga-hyun as Queen Myeongseong
- Joo Jin-mo as Sa-am
- Uhm Hyun-kyung as So Ka-young
- Park Hyuk-kwon as Baek Seok-gu
- Hwang Young-hee as Baek Seok-gu's wife
- Yoon Hee-seok as Seo Doo-shik
- Kim Young-im as Jo Bi
- Oh Eun-ho as Hong Mi-geum
- Oh In-hye as Jung Mal-geum
- Seo Beom-shik as Kang Jung-doo
- Im Chae-won as Lee Myung-hwan
- Na Sung-kyun as Park Byung-joo
- Lee Sook as Choi Ga-bi
- Heo Yi-seul as Park Eun-bi
- Yoo In-suk as farmer
- Han Choon-il as doctor at royal horse stable
- Jeon Heon-tae as doctor at royal horse stable
- Kim Ho-young as Oh Kyu-tae
- Na Jae-kyun as First Secretary
- So Hyang as Kyu-soo
- Jung Dong-gyu as Shim Moon-kwan
- Kim Tae-jong as Ji-pyung
- Lee Jong-goo as Lee Myung-hwan's stepfather
- Yang Han-yeol as young Ji-nyeong's friend
- Oh Jung-tae as Doo-mok
- Kang Shin-jo as Guru Uigeumbu
- Shin Joon-young as Byun
- Kim Ik-tae as Joseon's officer
- Choi Eun-seok as Joseon's officer
- Ki Yeon-ho as Joseon's officer
- Park Gi-san as Joseon's officer
- Song Yong-tae as Joseon's officer

=== Guest appearances ===
- Jung Gyu-woon as Crown Prince Sohyeon
- Kyung Soo-jin as Crown Princess Minhoe of the Kang clan
- Sunwoo Jae-duk as King Injo
- Choi Deok-moon as King Hyojong
- Kwon Tae-won as Kim Ja-jeom
- Jang Young-nam as Do-joon's wife and Kwang-hyun's mother
- Seo Hyun-jin as So-yong Jo, later Gwi-in Jo
- Jo Deok-hyun as Lee Hyung-ik
- Song Min-hyung as Boo Tae-soo
- Lee Hee-jin as Woo-hee
- Im Byung-ki as Soo-bo, Woo-hee's older brother
- Yoon Jin-ho as Choi Hyun-wook
- Park Young-ji as Hong Yoon-shik
- Kang Han-byeol as little crown prince, later King Sukjong
- Jung Yoon-seok as the child (ep 8)

== Episode ratings ==
- In the table below, the blue numbers represent the lowest ratings and the red numbers represent the highest ratings.
- NR denotes that the drama did not rank in the top 20 daily programs on that date.

| Original broadcast date | Episode | Average audience share | | | |
| Original broadcast date | Episode | TNmS Ratings | | AGB Nielsen | |
| Original broadcast date | Episode | Nationwide | Seoul National Capital Area | Nationwide | Seoul National Capital Area |
|---|---|---|---|---|---|
| 2012-10-01 | 01 | 10.0% (15th) | 11.7% (8th) | 8.7% (16th) | 9.1% (17th) |
| 2012-10-02 | 02 | 12.5% (9th) | 13.1% (7th) | 9.7% (15th) | 10.7% (10th) |
| 2012-10-08 | 03 | 5.9% (NR) | 6.9% (NR) | 6.6% (NR) | 7.6% (NR) |
| 2012-10-09 | 04 | 9.2% (17th) | 9.2% (19th) | 10.0% (12th) | 11.0% (11th) |
| 2012-10-15 | 05 | 11.7% (14th) | 13.4% (5th) | 10.4% (13th) | 12.1% (8th) |
| 2012-10-16 | 06 | 12.5% (7th) | 12.6% (6th) | 12.9% (6th) | 13.9% (5th) |
| 2012-10-22 | 07 | 15.0% (3rd) | 16.1% (3rd) | 14.3% (4th) | 15.6% (3rd) |
| 2012-10-23 | 08 | 15.3% (5th) | 16.9% (4th) | 14.3% (5th) | 16.9% (3rd) |
| 2012-10-29 | 09 | 13.1% (4th) | 14.8% (4th) | 13.4% (3rd) | 15.2% (3rd) |
| 2012-10-30 | 10 | 14.0% (9th) | 16.0% (5th) | 13.5% (7th) | 15.1% (5th) |
| 2012-11-05 | 11 | 14.5% (5th) | 16.0% (4th) | 14.7% (4th) | 15.9% (4th) |
| 2012-11-06 | 12 | 15.5% (4th) | 17.1% (4th) | 15.4% (4th) | 16.8% (4th) |
| 2012-11-12 | 13 | 13.8% (9th) | 14.0% (5th) | 14.6% (4th) | 16.4% (4th) |
| 2012-11-13 | 14 | 16.4% (4th) | 17.8% (3rd) | 16.8% (4th) | 18.5% (3rd) |
| 2012-11-19 | 15 | 15.7% (5th) | 17.9% (4th) | 17.8% (3rd) | 20.0% (3rd) |
| 2012-11-20 | 16 | 16.7% (4th) | 17.4% (4th) | 18.1% (3rd) | 20.3% (3rd) |
| 2012-11-26 | 17 | 17.0% (4th) | 19.1% (3rd) | 17.7% (3rd) | 19.5% (3rd) |
| 2012-11-27 | 18 | 17.8% (4th) | 19.9% (3rd) | 18.9% (3rd) | 20.6% (2nd) |
| 2012-12-03 | 19 | 19.1% (4th) | 21.4% (3rd) | 18.0% (3rd) | 19.7% (3rd) |
| 2012-12-04 | 20 | 18.7% (2nd) | 21.7% (1st) | 17.8% (2nd) | 19.1% (1st) |
| 2012-12-10 | 21 | 17.6% (3rd) | 19.7% (1st) | 16.0% (4th) | 17.5% (2nd) |
| 2012-12-11 | 22 | 17.4% (3rd) | 20.7% (3rd) | 17.4% (3rd) | 18.8% (3rd) |
| 2012-12-17 | 23 | 17.5% (3rd) | 19.0% (3rd) | 17.7% (3rd) | 19.0% (3rd) |
| 2012-12-18 | 24 | 18.0% (3rd) | 19.7% (3rd) | 18.9% (3rd) | 20.6% (2nd) |
| 2012-12-24 | 25 | 17.2% (3rd) | 19.3% (3rd) | 17.1% (3rd) | 19.1% (3rd) |
| 2012-12-25 | 26 | 20.2% (3rd) | 21.7% (3rd) | 19.1% (3rd) | 19.9% (3rd) |
| 2013-01-01 | 27 | 18.1% (3rd) | 20.0% (3rd) | 18.1% (3rd) | 19.4% (3rd) |
| 2013-01-07 | 28 | 18.3% (3rd) | 20.7% (3rd) | 16.6% (3rd) | 17.7% (3rd) |
| 2013-01-08 | 29 | 20.3% (3rd) | 22.1% (2nd) | 18.3% (3rd) | 19.7% (3rd) |
| 2013-01-14 | 30 | 18.9% (3rd) | 21.1% (3rd) | 18.1% (3rd) | 19.5% (3rd) |
| 2013-01-15 | 31 | 20.5% (3rd) | 23.0% (2nd) | 19.2% (3rd) | 20.4% (3rd) |
| 2013-01-21 | 32 | 19.4% (3rd) | 21.3% (2nd) | 20.1% (3rd) | 21.8% (3rd) |
| 2013-01-22 | 33 | 20.7% (3rd) | 22.9% (2nd) | 20.0% (3rd) | 21.4% (3rd) |
| 2013-01-28 | 34 | 19.4% (3rd) | 22.2% (2nd) | 18.4% (3rd) | 20.1% (3rd) |
| 2013-01-29 | 35 | 21.5% (3rd) | 24.4% (2nd) | 21.0% (3rd) | 21.5% (3rd) |
| 2013-02-04 | 36 | 22.8% (3rd) | 24.8% (2nd) | 22.4% (3rd) | 24.2% (2nd) |
| 2013-02-05 | 37 | 24.2% (2nd) | 26.7% (2nd) | 23.7% (3rd) | 25.8% (2nd) |
| 2013-02-11 | 38 | 20.8% (3rd) | 24.1% (2nd) | 19.3% (3rd) | 20.7% (3rd) |
| 2013-02-12 | 39 | 19.5% (4th) | 22.2% (3rd) | 20.3% (2nd) | 22.7% (2nd) |
| 2013-02-18 | 40 | 21.2% (3rd) | 24.1% (2nd) | 19.4% (3rd) | 21.4% (3rd) |
| 2013-02-19 | 41 | 19.7% (3rd) | 22.5% (2nd) | 18.1% (4th) | 19.0% (4th) |
| 2013-02-25 | 42 | 20.6% (3rd) | 23.3% (3rd) | 19.6% (3rd) | 22.0% (3rd) |
| 2013-02-26 | 43 | 20.0% (3rd) | 21.5% (3rd) | 19.7% (3rd) | 21.9% (3rd) |
| 2013-03-04 | 44 | 18.4% (3rd) | 20.6% (3rd) | 18.4% (3rd) | 20.6% (3rd) |
| 2013-03-05 | 45 | 18.8% (3rd) | 20.5% (2nd) | 18.5% (4th) | 20.4% (2nd) |
| 2013-03-11 | 46 | 19.6% (3rd) | 21.7% (3rd) | 18.8% (3rd) | 20.6% (3rd) |
| 2013-03-12 | 47 | 18.9% (4th) | 21.0% (4th) | 19.4% (3rd) | 21.4% (3rd) |
| 2013-03-18 | 48 | 18.0% (5th) | 20.5% (4th) | 18.8% (3rd) | 20.9% (3rd) |
| 2013-03-19 | 49 | 17.9% (5th) | 19.6% (5th) | 19.1% (4th) | 21.1% (3rd) |
| 2013-03-25 | 50 | 17.2% (4th) | 18.4% (5th) | 17.8% (4th) | 20.2% (3rd) |
| Average | | 17.3% | - | 17.1% | - |

== Awards and nominations ==
| Year | Award | Category | Recipient | Result |
|---|---|---|---|---|
| 2012 | MBC Drama Awards | Grand Prize (Daesang) | Cho Seung-woo | Won |
| 2012 | MBC Drama Awards | Best Drama | The King's Doctor | Nominated |
| 2012 | MBC Drama Awards | Top Excellence Award, Actor in a Special Project Drama | Cho Seung-woo | Won |
| 2012 | MBC Drama Awards | Top Excellence Award, Actor in a Special Project Drama | Son Chang-min | Nominated |
| 2012 | MBC Drama Awards | Top Excellence Award, Actress in a Special Project Drama | Lee Yo-won | Nominated |
| 2012 | MBC Drama Awards | Top Excellence Award, Actress in a Special Project Drama | Yoo Sun | Nominated |
| 2012 | MBC Drama Awards | Excellence Award, Actor in a Special Project Drama | Han Sang-jin | Nominated |
| 2012 | MBC Drama Awards | Excellence Award, Actor in a Special Project Drama | Lee Sang-woo | Won |
| 2012 | MBC Drama Awards | Excellence Award, Actress in a Special Project Drama | Kim Hye-sun | Nominated |
| 2012 | MBC Drama Awards | Best New Actress | Kim So-eun | Won |

== International broadcast ==
| Country | Channel | Series premiere | Title |
|---|---|---|---|
| Japan | NHK | 2013 | 馬医 (Umai) |
| Vietnam | SCTV Phim tổng hợp | October 2013 | Ngự y của hoàng đế |
| Mongolia | Channel 25 | November 2013 | Морины эмч (Morinii emch) |
| Sri Lanka | Rupavahini | November 2013 | ඉසිවර වෙදැදුරු (Isiwara Wedaduru) |
| Cambodia | Cambodian Television Network | December 2013 | ពេទ្យសេះម្ចាស់ស្នេហ៍ (Pet Seh Mchas Sne) |
| Indonesia | Indosiar | November 2014 | King's Doctor |
| Philippines | GMA Network | June 2015 | |
| Turkey | TRT 1 | 2013 | |
