= Hyojong of Joseon =

King of Joseon from 1649 to 1659

Hyojong

King of Joseon
- Reign: 17 June 1649 – 23 June 1659
- Enthronement: 22 June 1649; Injeongjeon, Changdeokgung
- Predecessor: Injo
- Successor: Hyeonjong

Crown Prince of Joseon
- Tenure: 14 November 1645 – 17 June 1649
- Predecessor: Crown Prince Wang
- Successor: Crown Prince Yeon
- Born: 3 July 1619; Gyeonghyang-bang, Hanseong, Joseon
- Died: 23 June 1659 (aged 39); Daejojeon, Changdeokgung, Hanseong, Joseon
- Burial: Nyeongneung, Yeoju, South Korea
- Spouse: Queen Inseon (m. 1631)
- Issue Detail: Hyeonjong of Joseon; Princess Uisun (adopted)
Names
- Yi Ho (이호; 李淏)
Era dates
- Adopted the era name of the Qing dynasty (Note: Sunchi (Shunzhi) (순치; 順治): 1649–1659)
Regnal name
- Heumcheon Daldo Gwangui Hongyeol (흠천달도광의홍열; 欽天達道光毅弘烈) (Note: Known as honorific name (존호; 尊號) in the Sinosphere, its closest equivalent in the English-speaking world is the regnal name.)
Posthumous name
- Joseon: Great King Chungseon Seonmun Jangmu Sinseong Hyeonin Myeongeui Jeongdeok (충선선문장무신성현인명의정덕대왕; 忠宣宣文章武神聖顯仁明義正德大王); Qing dynasty: Chungseon (충선; 忠宣)
Temple name
- Hyojong (효종; 孝宗)
- Clan: Jeonju Yi
- Dynasty: Yi
- Father: King Injo
- Mother: Queen Inyeol
- Religion: Confucianism (Neo-Confucianism)

Korean name
- Hangul: 효종
- Hanja: 孝宗
- Lit.: "Filial Ancestor"
- RR: Hyojong
- MR: Hyojong

Royal title
- Hangul: 봉림대군
- Hanja: 鳳林大君
- RR: Bongnim daegun
- MR: Pongnim taegun

Art name
- Hangul: 죽오
- Hanja: 竹梧
- RR: Juko
- MR: Chugo

Courtesy name
- Hangul: 정연
- Hanja: 靜淵
- RR: Jeongyeon
- MR: Chŏngyŏn

Hyojong (Korean: 효종; Hanja: 孝宗; 3 July 1619 – 23 June 1659), (Note: In the Korean calendar (lunisolar), he was born on the 22nd day of the 5th lunar month and died on the 4th day of the 5th lunar month.) personal name Yi Ho, was the 17th monarch of Joseon. He was the second son of King Injo and the younger brother of Crown Prince Sohyeon. Today, he is best known for his planned expedition to help the Ming dynasty fight the Manchu-led Qing dynasty, and his campaigns against the Tsardom of Russia at the orders of the Qing.

== Biography ==
=== Birth and background ===
King Hyojong was born in 1619 as the second son of King Injo, while his father was still a prince. In 1623, when the Westerners faction launched a coup that removed then-ruling Gwanghaegun and crowned Injo, Hyojong was called to the palace along with his father and given the title Grand Prince Bongrim in 1626.

=== Captive of the Qing dynasty ===
In 1627, King Injo's hard-line diplomatic policy brought war between Joseon Korea and the Later Jin dynasty. Later, in 1636, the Later Jin's successor state, Qing dynasty, defeated Joseon, and King Injo pledged his loyalty to the Qing emperor at Samjeondo, bowing down at Hong Taiji's feet nine times. There, Injo and Hong Taiji signed a treaty, which included that the Qing dynasty would take Crown Prince Sohyeon, Injo's oldest son, and Hyojong to China as captive.

During his exile in China, Hyojong mostly tried to defend his older brother from the threats of the Qing dynasty. Hong Taiji and his Qing forces were still at war against the Ming dynasty and also engaged in battle with the Mongols and Chinese Muslims; and many times, the Qing emperor requested Prince Sohyeon to go to the battlefield and help command troops against the Qing's enemies. However, Hyojong was worried about his brother because he was the official heir to the throne of Joseon and had no military experience. He went on to fight the Ming loyalists in his brother's place, and he also followed Sohyeon to battles against the Uyghurs and Muslims on the western front.

Along with his brother, he made contact with Europeans while he was in China; and also he learned that Joseon needed to develop new technology and a stronger political and military system in order to protect itself from foreign powers. He also developed a grudge against Qing dynasty, which separated him from his home country and his family. It was during this period that he decided to make a massive plan for northern campaigns against the Qing dynasty, an act of vengeance on the Qing dynasty for the war of 1636.

=== Enthronement ===
In 1645, Crown Prince Sohyeon returned to Joseon alone, in order to succeed Injo to the throne and to help Injo to govern the nation. However, he often came into conflict with Injo, who disliked Sohyeon's open view of European culture and diplomatic views of the Qing dynasty. Soon he was found dead at the King's room, and buried quickly after a short funeral. Later, Injo also executed Sohyeon's wife who tried to find out the real reason for her husband's death. Legends say that Injo killed his own son with an ink slab that the Crown Prince brought from China.

Rather than selecting Crown Prince Sohyeon's oldest son, Prince Suk Chul, as the next royal successor, Injo selected Grand Prince Bong Rim and gave him the title of Crown Prince. When King Injo died in 1649, Hyojong inherited the throne, becoming the 17th monarch of Joseon.

=== Northern campaigns ===
After rising to the throne, he began to reform and expand the military of Korea; first he removed Kim Chajŏm, who had corrupted politics and had greater power than the king himself. Then, he called Song Si-yeol and Kim Sang-heon to his court, who supported war against the Qing Dynasty. His military expansion was massive, and he also built several border fortresses along Yalu River where Joseon and Qing shared a border. When a band of Dutch sailors including Hendrick Hamel drifted on Jeju Island, Hyojong ordered them to build muskets for the army, providing muskets to the Koreans for the first time after the Imjin War.

However, the Qing dynasty continued to thrive, expanding quickly into the west after successfully conquering the Ming in 1644. The campaign was unable to be put in action, since the Qing dynasty assimilated the massive Han army into their own. The Joseon military, although reformed and expanded, was no match against the combined Manchu and Han forces.

The expanded military was first put into action in 1654, when the Qing dynasty called for help to fight against invading Russians. 150 Joseon musketeers, along with 3,000 Manchus, met the Russian army at the Battle of Hutong (호통; 好通), present-day Yilan, which was won by the Qing–Joseon allied forces. Four years later, in 1658, Hyojong sent troops once again to help Qing dynasty against Russia; 260 Joseon musketeers and cannoneers led by Shin Ryu joined the forces of Ninguta Military Governor Sarhuda, the joint force sailed down the Hurka and Sungari Rivers and met the Russian forces under command of an Amur Cossack, Onufriy Stepanov near the fall of the Sungari River into the Amur, killing 270 Russians and driving them out of Qing territory. The battles against Russia proved that Hyojong's reform had stabilized the Joseon army, although they were never put into action again. Despite the campaigns, Russia and Joseon remained on good terms. The Northern campaign is known as Naseon Jeongbeol (나선정벌; 羅禪征伐), or "Suppression of the Russians").

=== Other accomplishments and death ===
During his reign, many books about farming were published to promote agriculture, which had been devastated during the Seven Year War. Hyojong also continued Gwanghaegun's reconstructions; he had a hard time restoring the economy at the same time as expanding the military. He also had to make more coins with metals which could have been used to make ammunitions, but had to give them up in order to rebuild his kingdom. He had too much stress dealing with numerous problems inside and outside of the country, and suddenly died at the early age of 39 in 1659 from a small boil on his face. While his contemporaries had suspected that he had been poisoned, article published by a medical journal in Ewha University notes that Hyojong had been suffering diabetes prior to his death and likely died from a combination of an infection due to his diabetes as well as a fatal injury of his temporal artery. Although his plan for northern conquest was never put in action, many people regard him as a brilliant and brave ruler who dedicated his life to serving his nation.

== Family ==
- Father: King Injo (인조대왕; 7 December 1595 – 17 June 1649)
  - Grandfather: King Wonjong (원종대왕; 12 August 1580 – 23 January 1620)
  - Grandmother: Queen Inheon (인헌왕후), of the Neungseong Gu clan (능성 구씨; 2 June 1578 – 10 February 1626)
- Mother: Queen Inyeol (인렬왕후), of the Cheongju Han clan (청주 한씨; 16 August 1594 – 16 January 1636)
  - Grandfather: Han Jun-gyeom (한준겸), Internal Prince Seopyeong (서평부원군; 1557–1627)
  - Grandmother: Internal Princess Consort Hoesan (회산부부인), of the Changwon Hwang clan (창원 황씨; 1561–1594)
- Stepmother: Queen Jangnyeol (장렬왕후), of the Yangju Jo clan (양주 조씨; 16 December 1624 – 20 September 1688)

Consort(s) and their respective issue

- Queen Inseon (인선왕후), of the Deoksu Jang clan (덕수 장씨; 9 February 1619 – 30 March 1674)
  - Princess Suksin (숙신공주; 1634 – 21 September 1645), first daughter
  - Princess Sukan (숙안공주; 1 June 1636 – 2 February 1698), second daughter
  - Unnamed son (c. 1637–1642)
  - Princess Sukmyeong (숙명공주; 17 March 1640 – 16 April 1699), third daughter
  - Yi Yeon (이연), King Hyeonjong (현종대왕; 14 March 1641 – 17 September 1674), first son
  - Princess Sukhwi (숙휘공주; 17 March 1642 – 21 November 1696), fourth daughter
  - Unnamed daughter (c. 1643–1644)
  - Unnamed son (1645)
  - Princess Sukjeong (숙정공주; 13 December 1646 – 13 June 1668), fifth daughter
  - Princess Sukgyeong (숙경공주; 22 February 1648 – 17 February 1671), sixth daughter
  - Princess Uisun (의순공주; 1635–1662), adopted daughter
- Concubine An (안빈), of the Gyeongju Yi clan (경주 이씨; 1622 – 20 November 1693)
  - Princess Suknyeong (숙녕옹주; 1649 – 28 June 1668), seventh daughter
- Sugui (숙의), of the Kim clan (김씨)
- Sugwon (숙원), of the Jeong clan (정씨)

== Ancestry ==
Ancestors of Hyojong of Joseon

Grand Internal Prince Deokheung (덕흥대원군)
King Seonjo (선조대왕)
Grand Internal Princess Consort Hadong, of the Hadong Jeong clan (하동부대부인 하동 정씨)
King Wonjong (원종대왕)
Kim Han-u (김한우)
Concubine In, of the Suwon Kim clan (인빈 수원 김씨)
Lady, of the Jeonju Yi clan (전주 이씨)
King Injo (인조대왕)
Gu Sun (구순)
Gu Sa-maeng, Internal Prince Neungan (능안부원군 구사맹)
Lady, of the Jeonju Yi clan (전주 이씨)
Queen Inheon, of the Neungseong Gu clan (인헌왕후 능성 구씨)
Shin Hwa-guk (신화국)
Internal Princess Consort Pyongsan, of the Pyongsan Shin clan (평산부부인 평산 신씨)
Lady, of the Papyeong Yun clan (파평 윤씨)
King Hyojong
Han Yeo-pil (한여필)
Han Hyo-yun (한효윤)
Lady, of the Munhwa Yu clan (문화 유씨)
Han Jun-gyeom, Internal Prince Seopyeong (서평부원군 한준겸)
Shin Geon (신건)
Lady, of the Pyongsan Shin clan (평산 신씨)
Lady, of the Sunheung An clan (순흥 안씨)
Queen Inyeol, of the Cheongju Han clan (인렬왕후 청주 한씨)
Hwang Tang-gyeong (황탕경)
Hwang Seong (황성)
Internal Princess Consort Hoesan, of the Changwon Hwang clan (회산부부인 창원 황씨)
Lady, of the Ubong Yi clan (우봉 이씨)

== In popular culture ==
- Portrayed by Kim Heung-ki in the 1981 KBS1 TV series Daemyeong.
- Portrayed by Lee In in the 2010 KBS2 TV series The Slave Hunters.
- Portrayed by Choi Deok-moon in the 2012 MBC TV series The King's Doctor.
- Portrayed by Kim Joo-young in the 2013 JTBC TV series Blooded Palace: The War of Flowers.
- Portrayed by Lee Tae-ri in the 2015 MBC TV series Splendid Politics.
- Portrayed by Yeon Woo-jin in the 2016 film Seondal: The Man Who Sells the River.
- Inspired a fictional king portrayed by Jo Jung-suk in the 2024 tvN TV series Captivating the King.

== See also ==
- History of Korea
- List of monarchs of Korea
- Styles and titles in Joseon
- Politics of Joseon

== Notes ==
Hyojong of Joseon House of Yi Born: 3 July 1619 Died: 23 June 1659
Royal titles
Preceded by Injo	King of Joseon; 17 June 1649 – 23 June 1659	Succeeded by Hyeonjong
