= Crown Prince Sohyeon =

Crown Prince of Joseon (1612–1645)

Crown Prince of Joseon
- Tenure: 5 March 1625 – 21 May 1645
- Investiture: Yungjeongjeon, Gyeongdeokgung
- Predecessor: Crown Prince Ji
- Successor: Crown Prince Ho
- Born: 5 February 1612; Hoehyeon-bang, Hanseong, Joseon
- Died: 21 May 1645 (aged 33); Hwangyeongjeon, Changgyeonggung, Hanseong, Joseon
- Burial: Sogyeongwon, Seosamneung Cluster, Goyang, South Korea
- Spouse: Crown Princess Minhoe (m. 1627)
- Issue Detail: 4 sons, 5 daughters
Names
- Yi Wang (이왕; 李𣳫)
Posthumous name
- Crown Prince Sohyeon (소현세자; 昭顯世子)
- Clan: Jeonju Yi
- Dynasty: Yi
- Father: King Injo
- Mother: Queen Inyeol
- Religion: Confucianism (Neo-Confucianism)

Korean name
- Hangul: 소현세자
- Hanja: 昭顯世子
- RR: Sohyeon seja
- MR: Sohyŏn seja

Crown Prince Sohyeon (Korean: 소현세자; Hanja: 昭顯世子; 5 February 1612 – 21 May 1645), personal name Yi Wang, was the eldest son of King Injo, the 16th monarch of Joseon, and the elder brother of King Hyojong.

For eight years, he lived as a hostage in the Qing Empire as a result of the peace treaty concluded after the 1636 invasion, and was exposed to Western civilization after meeting Jesuit missionary Johann Adam Schall von Bell in Beijing. Not long after returning to Joseon, he met a mysterious death while in conflict with his father, King Injo, who adhered to anti-Qing ideology.

== Biography ==
Sohyeon was invested as crown prince of Joseon in 1625 after his father, King Injo, had taken the throne through insurrection in 1623.

In 1627, he married a daughter of Kang Seok-gi (17th-generation descendant of Kang Kamch'an). During the Qing invasion of Joseon in 1636, Sohyeon fled to the Namhan Mountain Fortress with his father. But when Ganghwa Island was captured by the Manchus, King Injo surrendered to Hong Taiji. Sohyeon was taken as a hostage alongside his wife, his younger brother and sister-in-law, and the sons of several other Joseon officials; they were brought to Shenyang, the then-capital of the Qing dynasty.

During his time as a hostage, Sohyeon worked as a mediator between Joseon and the Qing dynasty. He put effort into ensuring the Qing would not engage in further hostilities against Joseon, and protected his people, such as Kim Sang-heon, who was accused of being an anti-Qing agent. He also learned the Mongol language and assisted in the conquest of the western border.

In 1644, Sohyeon spent 70 days in Beijing with Dorgon, who had set out to conquer the remnants of the Ming dynasty. There, he met Jesuit missionaries such as the German Johann Adam Schall von Bell, and through them he was introduced to Roman Catholicism and Western ideas.

King Injo and his close administrators condemned Sohyeon's conduct as pro-Qing. When he returned in 1645, King Injo persecuted him for attempting to modernize Joseon by bringing in Western culture. Sohyeon died suddenly not long after his return; he was found dead in the king's room, mysteriously bleeding severely from the head. Legends say that Injo killed his son with an ink slab that the crown prince brought from China; however, some historians suggest he was poisoned due to the fact that he had black spots all over his body after his death and that his corpse decomposed rapidly. Many, including his wife, tried to uncover the truth, but King Injo ordered immediate burial and reduced the grandeur of the funeral. Sohyeon's tomb is located in Goyang, Gyeonggi Province.

King Injo then appointed Grand Prince Bongrim as the new crown prince (posthumously King Hyojong) rather than Sohyeon's eldest son. Soon after, Injo ordered the exile of Sohyeon's three sons to Jeju Island, from which only the youngest son, returned alive, and the execution of Sohyeon's wife, Crown Princess Minhoe, for treason.

== Family ==
- Father: King Injo (인조대왕; 7 December 1595 – 17 June 1649)
  - Grandfather: King Wonjong (원종대왕; 12 August 1580 – 23 January 1620)
  - Grandmother: Queen Inheon (인헌왕후), of the Neungseong Gu clan (능성 구씨; 2 June 1578 – 10 February 1626)
- Mother: Queen Inyeol (인렬왕후), of the Cheongju Han clan (청주 한씨; 16 August 1594 – 16 January 1636)
  - Grandfather: Han Jun-gyeom (한준겸), Internal Prince Seopyeong (서평부원군; 1557–1627)
  - Grandmother: Internal Princess Consort Hoesan (회산부부인), of the Changwon Hwang clan (창원 황씨; 1561–1594)
- Stepmother: Queen Jangnyeol (장렬왕후), of the Yangju Jo clan (양주 조씨; 16 December 1624 – 20 September 1688)

Consort(s) and their respective issue

- Crown Princess Minhoe (민회빈), of the Geumcheon Kang clan (금천 강씨; 18 April 1611 – 30 April 1646)
  - Unnamed daughter (1628 – c. 1640)
  - Unnamed daughter (1631)
  - Yi Baek (이백), Prince Gyeongseon (경선군; 30 April 1636 – 2 November 1648), first son (Note: His childhood name was Seok-cheol (석철).)
  - County Princess Gyeongsuk (경숙군주; 1637–1655), first daughter
  - Prince Gyeongwan (경완군; 1640 – 4 February 1649), second son (Note: His childhood name was Seok-rin (석린).)
  - County Princess Gyeongnyeong (경녕군주; 1642–1682), second daughter
  - County Princess Gyeongsun (경순군주; 1643–1697); given name Jeong-on (정온), third daughter
  - Yi Hoe (이회), Prince Gyeongan (경안군; 3 November 1644 – 22 October 1665), third son (Note: His childhood name was Seok-gyeon (석견).)
  - Unnamed son (1645)

== Ancestry ==
Ancestors of Crown Prince Sohyeon

Grand Internal Prince Deokheung (덕흥대원군)
King Seonjo (선조대왕)
Grand Internal Princess Consort Hadong, of the Hadong Jeong clan (하동부대부인 하동 정씨)
King Wonjong (원종대왕)
Kim Han-u (김한우)
Concubine In, of the Suwon Kim clan (인빈 수원 김씨)
Lady, of the Jeonju Yi clan (전주 이씨)
King Injo (인조대왕)
Gu Sun (구순)
Gu Sa-maeng, Internal Prince Neungan (능안부원군 구사맹)
Lady, of the Jeonju Yi clan (전주 이씨)
Queen Inheon, of the Neungseong Gu clan (인헌왕후 능성 구씨)
Shin Hwa-guk (신화국)
Internal Princess Consort Pyongsan, of the Pyongsan Shin clan (평산부부인 평산 신씨)
Lady, of the Papyeong Yun clan (파평 윤씨)
Crown Prince Sohyeon
Han Yeo-pil (한여필)
Han Hyo-yun (한효윤)
Lady, of the Munhwa Yu clan (문화 유씨)
Han Jun-gyeom, Internal Prince Seopyeong (서평부원군 한준겸)
Shin Geon (신건)
Lady, of the Pyongsan Shin clan (평산 신씨)
Lady, of the Sunheung An clan (순흥 안씨)
Queen Inyeol, of the Cheongju Han clan (인렬왕후 청주 한씨)
Hwang Tang-gyeong (황탕경)
Hwang Seong (황성)
Internal Princess Consort Hoesan, of the Changwon Hwang clan (회산부부인 창원 황씨)
Lady, of the Ubong Yi clan (우봉 이씨)

== In popular culture ==
- Portrayed by Baek Yoon-sik in the 1981 KBS1 TV series Daemyeong.
- Portrayed by Kim Ji-wan in the 2008 SBS TV series Iljimae.
- Portrayed by Im Ho in the 2008 KBS2 TV series Strongest Chil Woo.
- Portrayed by So Young-don in the 2009 MBC TV series Tamra, the Island.
- Portrayed by Kang Sung-min in the 2010 KBS2 TV series The Slave Hunters.
- Portrayed by Jung Gyu-woon in the 2012 MBC TV series The King's Doctor.
- Portrayed by Jung Sung-woon in the 2013 JTBC TV series Blooded Palace: The War of Flowers.
- Portrayed by Lee Jin-wook in the 2014 tvN TV series The Three Musketeers.
- Portrayed by Baek Sung-hyun in the 2015 MBC TV series Splendid Politics.
- Mentioned in the 2020 SBS TV series The King: Eternal Monarch. In a parallel universe, he lived to become king and this caused a chain reaction that culminated in a modern constitutional monarchy.
- Portrayed by Lee Joon-hyuk in the 2021 tvN TV series Secret Royal Inspector & Joy.
- Portrayed by Kim Sung-cheol in the 2022 film The Night Owl.
- Portrayed by Kim Mu-jun in the 2023 MBC TV series My Dearest.

== See also ==
- Later Jin invasion of Joseon
- History of Korea
- Styles and titles in Joseon
- Politics of Joseon
