= Inbin Kim =

Korean royal consort (1555–1613)

- Royal Consort of the Senior First Rank
- Born: 31 March 1555; Haeju-mok, Hwanghae Province, Joseon
- Died: 30 November 1613 (aged 58); Hanseong, Joseon
- Burial: Sungangwon, Namyangju, South Korea
- Consort of: King Seonjo
- Issue Detail: 4 sons, 5 daughters
Posthumous name
- Concubine Gyeonghye In (경혜인빈; 敬惠仁嬪)
- Clan: Suwon Kim (by birth); Jeonju Yi (by marriage)
- Dynasty: Yi
- Father: Kim Han-u
- Mother: Lady, of the Jeonju Yi clan

Korean name
- Hangul: 인빈 김씨
- Hanja: 仁嬪金氏
- RR: Inbin Gimssi
- MR: Inbin Kimssi

Inbin Kim (Korean: 인빈 김씨; Hanja: 仁嬪 金氏; 31 March 1555 – 30 November 1613), or Concubine In, (Note: The literal translation of bin (빈; 嬪) is "concubine". Combined with the honorific title in (인; 仁), the full meaning is "Benevolent Concubine".) of the Suwon Kim clan, was a consort of King Seonjo, the 14th monarch of Joseon, and the biological grandmother of King Injo.

== Biography ==
=== Early life and lineage ===
Lady Kim was born during the reign of King Myeongjong. Her father was Kim Han-u (김한우) and her mother was a lady from the Jeonju Yi clan. She had at least one elder sister and one younger brother, and her niece later became Sowon Shin (소원 신씨), a relatively low-ranked consort of Gwanghaegun.

On her maternal side, she was 5th great-granddaughter of King Taejong and Queen Wongyeong via their second surviving son, Grand Prince Hyoryeong.

=== As royal consort ===
Lady Kim was taken in and raised by her childless maternal aunt, Sugui Yi (숙의 이씨), a consort of King Myeongjong. While in the palace, she caught the eye of Queen Insun, who recommended her King Seonjo. In 1573, Lady Kim was appointed as a royal consort of the junior fourth rank (숙원; sugwon). In the next three decades, she was promoted to the senior third rank (소용; soyong), then the junior second rank (숙의; sugui) and the junior first rank (귀인; gwiin), before finally rising to the senior first rank (빈; bin) in 1605, with the honorific title in (仁), meaning "benevolence".

During her 40-year tenure, she was Seonjo's most favored consort and gave birth to four sons and five daughters. Her eldest son died young, but the king deeply cherished their second son, Prince Sinseong (신성군), and Lady Kim worked toward having him installed as crown prince. However, Prince Sinseong died in Uiju shortly after the Imjin War broke out and his elder half-brother, Prince Gwanghae (better known as Gwanghaegun), was named heir. Although her relationship with his biological mother, the late Concubine Gong, had been strained in their youth, Lady Kim later chose to support Gwanghaegun, earning his high esteem and goodwill toward her own children.

=== Death and aftermath ===
Lady Kim died at the age of 58, having survived King Seonjo by five years, and was buried in present-say Namyangju, Gyeonggi Province. Gwanghaegun ordered the suspension of court sessions for three days, but the Office of the Inspector-General objected, citing the lack of precedent.

Ten years following her death, Gwanghaegun was deposed in a coup d'état staged by her grandson, Prince Neungyang (posthumously King Injo).

During the reign of King Yeongjo, Lady Kim was also conferred the posthumous name Gyeonghye (경혜; lit. ''respectful favor''), her tomb was elevated to Sungangwon (순강원), and the shrine of her spirit tablet was designated as Jeogyeonggung (저경궁). (Note: Today part of Chilgung (칠궁; lit. ''Seven Palaces''), the place which houses the spirit tablets of seven royal consorts who gave birth to kings.) Furthermore, as recognition for her decisive role in Lady Kim's ascent, Sugui Yi was posthumously promoted to the senior first rank (빈; bin), with the honorific title gyeong (慶), meaning "auspicious".

== Titles ==
- During the reign of King Myeongjong (r. 1545–1567):
  - Lady, of the Suwon Kim clan (수원 김씨; 水原金氏; from 31 March 1555)
    - Kim Han-u's daughter (김한우의 딸)
    - Lady Kim (김씨; 金氏)
- During the reign of King Seonjo (r. 1567–1608):
  - Sugwon (Note: lit. ''Lady of Warm Beauty'') (숙원; 淑媛; from 1573), royal consort of the junior fourth rank
  - Soyong (Note: lit. ''Lady of Bright Countenance'') (소용; 昭容; from unknown date), royal consort of the senior third rank
  - Sugui (Note: lit. ''Lady of Warm Deportment'') (숙의; 淑儀; from unknown date), royal consort of the junior second rank
  - Gwiin (Note: lit. ''Noble Lady'') (귀인; 貴人; from unknown date), royal consort of the junior first rank
  - Concubine In (인빈; 仁嬪; from 1 January 1605), royal consort of the senior first rank
- During the reign of King Yeongjo (r. 1724–1776):
  - Concubine Gyeonghyein (경혜인빈; 敬惠仁嬪; from 1755)

== Family ==
- Father: Kim Han-u (김한우; 1501–1577)
- Mother: Lady, of the Jeonju Yi clan (전주 이씨)
- Sibling(s)
  - Lady, of the Suwon Kim clan (수원 김씨) (Note: Married Shin Hyeon (신현; 1525–1609) from the Yeongsan Shin clan (영산 신씨). They had issue (4 sons, 1 daughter); including Sowon Shin (소원 신씨; consort of Gwanghaegun).)
  - Kim Gong-ryang (김공량)
- Consort of: King Seonjo (선조대왕; 6 December 1552 – 16 March 1608)
- Issue
  - Yi Seong (이성), Prince Uian (의안군; 20 August 1577 – 20 March 1588) (Note: ▪︎Wife: none. ▪︎Issue: 1 adopted son.)
  - Yi Ho (이후), Prince Sinseong (신성군; 6 January 1579 – 8 December 1592) (Note: ▪︎Wife: Princess Consort (군부인), of the Pyongsan Shin clan (평산 신씨; 1578–1622); elder daughter of Shin Rip and first cousin of Queen Inheon. ▪︎Issue: 2 adopted sons, 1 daughter.)
  - Yi Bu (이부), Prince Jeongwon (정원군; 12 August 1580 – 23 January 1620)
  - Princess Jeongsin (정신옹주; 18 August 1582 – 13 March 1653)
  - Princess Jeonghye (정혜옹주; 2 May 1584 – 22 December 1638) (Note: Married Yun Sin-ji (윤신지), Prince Consort Haesung (해숭위; 1582–1657) from the Haepyeong Yun clan (해평 윤씨); second son of Chief State Councilor Yun Bang (윤방; 1563–1640), grandson of Yun Du-su and great-great-grandson of King Jungjong. They had issue (4 sons, 1 daughter); among their descendants is Queen Ingyeong (great-great-granddaughter). [Lineage: King Jungjong → Princess Uihye (의혜공주; 1521–1564) → Han Ui (한의; 1545–?) → Lady, of the Cheongju Han clan (청주 한씨) → Yun Sin-ji])
  - Princess Jeongsuk (정숙옹주; 26 April 1587 – 12 December 1627) (Note: Married Shin Ik-seong (신익성), Prince Consort Dongyang (동양위; 1588–1644) from the Pyongsan Shin clan (평산 신씨); eldest son of Chief State Councilor Shin Heum (신흠; 1566–1628). They had issue (5 sons, 4 daughters).)
  - Yi Gwang (이광), Prince Uichang (의창군; 1589 – 2 December 1645) (Note: ▪︎Wife: Princess Consort Yangcheon (양천군부인), of the Yangcheon Heo clan (양천 허씨; 1589–?), given name Ye-eob (예업); youngest daughter of Heo Seong (허성; 1548–1612). ▪︎Issue: 1 adopted son.)
  - Princess Jeongan (정안옹주; 1590 – 27 September 1660) (Note: Married Park Mi (박미), Prince Geumyang (금양군; 1592–1645) from the Bannam Park clan (반남 박씨). They had issue (1 son).)
  - Princess Jeonghwi (정휘옹주; 7 August 1593 – 6 September 1653) (Note: Married Ryu Jeong-ryang (류정량), Prince Jeonchang (전창군; 1591–1663) from the Jeonju Ryu clan (전주 류씨). They had issue (2 sons, 2 daughters).)

== Ancestry ==
Ancestors of Inbin Kim

Kim Gwi-yeong (김귀영)
Kim Sun-eun (김순은)
Lady, of the Yangseong Yi clan (양성 이씨)
Kim Han-u (김한우)
Lady, of the Goryeong Park clan (고령 박씨)
Concubine In
Yi Seo (이서)
Yi Gyeon-son (이견손)
Lady, of the Suseong Na clan (수성 나씨)
Yi Hyo-saeng (이효성)
Lady, of the Jeonju Yi clan (전주 이씨)

== In popular culture ==
- Portrayed by Eom Yu-shin in the 1985–1986 MBC TV series 500 Years of Joseon: The Imjin War.
- Portrayed by Jang Seo-hee in the 1999–2000 MBC TV series Hur Jur.
- Portrayed by Lee Hye-sook in the 2003–2004 SBS TV series The King's Woman.
- Portrayed by Kim Mi-ra in the 2004–2005 KBS1 TV series Immortal Admiral Yi Sun-sin.
- Portrayed by Jung Si-a in the 2013 MBC TV series Hur Jun, The Original Story.
- Portrayed by Han Go-eun in the 2013 MBC TV series Goddess of Fire.
- Portrayed by Kim Gyu-ri in the 2014–2015 KBS2 TV series The King's Face.
- Portrayed by Kim Hye-eun in the 2015 KBS1 TV series The Jingbirok: A Memoir of Imjin War.

== See also ==
- History of Korea
- Styles and titles in Joseon
