= Blooded Palace: The War of Flowers =

South Korean television series

- Promotional poster
- Also known as: Blood Palace
- Hangul: 궁중잔혹사 – 꽃들의 전쟁
- Hanja: 宮中殘酷史 – 꽃들의 戰爭
- RR: Gungjung janhoksa – kkotdeurui jeonjaeng
- MR: Kungjung chanhoksa – kkottŭrŭi chŏnjaeng
- Genre: Historical; Drama; Romance
- Written by: Jung Ha-yeon
- Directed by: Noh Jong-chan; Kim Jae-hong
- Starring: Kim Hyun-joo; Lee Deok-hwa; Song Seon-mi; Jung Sung-mo; Jung Sung-woon; Kim Joo-young; Go Won-hee; Jun Tae-soo
- Composer: Lee Ji-yong
- Country of origin: South Korea
- Original language: Korean
- No. of episodes: 50

Production
- Executive producer: Jo Joon-hyung
- Producers: Shin Dong-ki; Go Jung-ho
- Production location: Korea
- Cinematography: Kim Gyeong-cheol
- Editors: Kim Soo-jin; Jeon Hyun-jung; Kwon Eun-hee
- Running time: 60 minutes
- Production company: Drama house

Original release
- Network: jTBC
- Release: 23 March – 8 September 2013

Blooded Palace: The War of Flowers (Korean: 궁중잔혹사 – 꽃들의 전쟁; lit. 'Cruel Palace – War of Flowers') is a 2013 South Korean historical television series starring Kim Hyun-joo, Lee Deok-hwa, Song Seon-mi, Jung Sung-mo, Jung Sung-woon, Kim Joo-young, Go Won-hee, and Jun Tae-soo. It aired on jTBC from March 23 to September 8, 2013 on Saturdays and Sundays at 20:45 (KST) for 50 episodes.

The series was streamed online on YouTube.

== Synopsis ==
It depicts a cruel hidden story within the royal court. Royal concubine Gwi-in Jo (Kim Hyun-joo) wants to make her son the king. In order to accomplish her goal, she holds the hand of Kim Ja-jeom and uses King Injo. She also attempts to get rid of Crown Prince Sohyeon.

== Cast ==
- Kim Hyun-joo as Yamjeon / Consort Gwi-in Jo
  - Lee Chae-mi as young Yamjeon
- Lee Deok-hwa as King Injo
- Shin Soo-yeon as Seol-hwa
- Song Seon-mi as Crown Princess Minhoe
- Jung Sung-mo as Kim Ja-jeom
- Jung Sung-woon as Crown Prince Sohyeon
- Kim Joo-young as Grand Prince Bongrim
- Go Won-hee as Queen Jangnyeol
- Jun Tae-soo as Nam Hyeok
- Jung Sun-kyung as Han Ok, Lady Jo's mother
- Son Byong-ho as Lee Hyeong-ik
- Seo Yi-sook as Seol-jook
- Lee Seol-hee as Yoo-deok
- Lee Seo-yun as Lady Park (Park Sukui)
- Kim Ha-kyun as Choi Myung-kil
- Han In-soo as Kim Sang-hun
- Kim Kyu-chul as Shim Ki-won
- Woo Hyun as eunuch Kim In
- Nam Neung-mi as Nam Hyeok's mother
- Kim San as Ma Bo-dae
- Kim Jong-kyul as Kim Ryu
- Lee Young-eun as Princess Hyomyeong
  - Lee Chae-mi as young Princess Hyomyeong
- Jung Yoon-seok as Shunzhi Emperor

== Ratings ==
In this table, the blue numbers represent the lowest ratings and the red numbers represent the highest ratings.

Ep.	Original broadcast date	Average audience share
Ep.	Original broadcast date	AGB Nielsen
Ep.	Original broadcast date	Nationwide
1	March 23, 2013	2.5%
2	March 24, 2013	2.0%
3	March 30, 2013	1.8%
4	March 31, 2013	2.1%
5	April 6, 2013	2.4%
6	April 7, 2013	2.6%
7	April 13, 2013	2.1%
8	April 14, 2013	2.8%
9	April 20, 2013	2.0%
10	April 21, 2013	2.8%
11	April 27, 2013	1.8%
12	April 28, 2013	2.3%
13	May 4, 2013	2.1%
14	May 5, 2013	2.4%
15	May 11, 2013	1.9%
16	May 12, 2013	2.5%
17	May 18, 2013	1.8%
18	May 19, 2013	1.9%
19	May 25, 2013	1.7%
20	May 26, 2013	2.1%
21	June 1, 2013	1.9%
22	June 2, 2013	1.8%
23	June 8, 2013	2.1%
24	June 9, 2013	2.1%
25	June 15, 2013	1.6%
26	June 16, 2013	2.0%
27	June 22, 2013	1.9%
28	June 23, 2013	2.0%
29	June 29, 2013	1.7%
30	June 30, 2013	1.8%
31	July 6, 2013	1.8%
32	July 7, 2013	2.3%
33	July 13, 2013	1.9%
34	July 14, 2013	2.4%
35	July 20, 2013	2.6%
36	July 21, 2013	3.1%
37	July 27, 2013	1.9%
38	July 28, 2013	2.9%
39	August 3, 2013	1.9%
40	August 4, 2013	2.1%
41	August 10, 2013	1.8%
42	August 11, 2013	2.2%
43	August 17, 2013	2.0%
44	August 18, 2013	2.5%
45	August 24, 2013	2.3%
46	August 25, 2013	3.1%
47	August 31, 2013	2.4%
48	September 1, 2013	3.7%
49	September 7, 2013	3.0%
50	September 8, 2013	4.3%
Average		2.2%

- This drama airs on a cable channel/pay TV which normally has a relatively smaller audience compared to free-to-air TV/public broadcasters (KBS, SBS, MBC and EBS).

== Awards and nominations ==
Year	Award	Category	Recipient	Result
2013	2nd APAN Star Awards	Excellence Award, Actress	Kim Hyun-joo	Nominated
