= Injo of Joseon =

King of Joseon from 1623 to 1649

Injo

King of Joseon
- Reign: 13 April 1623 – 17 June 1649
- Enthronement: Main Hall, Gyeongungung
- Predecessor: Gwanghaegun
- Successor: Hyojong
- Born: 7 December 1595; Haeju-mok, Hwanghae Province, Joseon
- Died: 17 June 1649 (aged 53); Daejojeon, Changdeokgung, Hanseong, Joseon
- Burial: Jangneung, Paju, South Korea
- Spouses: Queen Inyeol (m. 1610; died 1636) Queen Jangnyeol (m. 1639)
- Issue Detail: Crown Prince Sohyeon; Hyojong of Joseon; Grand Prince Inpyeong
Names
- Yi Jong (이종; 李倧)
Era dates
- Adopted the era name of the Ming, and later Qing dynasty (Note: Cheongye (Tianqi) (천계; 天啓): 1623–1627 Sungjeong (Chongzhen) (숭정; 崇禎): 1628–1637 (Note: Usage continued informally within the Joseon royal court well into the 19th century.) Sungdeok (Chongde) (숭덕; 崇德): 1637–1643 Sunchi (Shunzhi) (순치; 順治): 1644–1649)
Regnal name
- Gaecheon Joun Jeonggi Seondeok (개천조운정기선덕; 開天肇運正紀宣德) (Note: Known as honorific name (존호; 尊號) in the Sinosphere, its closest equivalent in the English-speaking world is the regnal name.)
Posthumous name
- Joseon: Great King Jangmok Heonmun Yeolmu Myeongsuk Sunhyo (장목헌문열무명숙순효대왕; 莊穆憲文烈武明肅純孝大王); Qing dynasty: Jangmok (장목; 莊穆)
Temple name
- Injo (인조; 仁祖)
- Clan: Jeonju Yi
- Dynasty: Yi
- Father: King Wonjong
- Mother: Queen Inheon
- Religion: Confucianism (Neo-Confucianism)

Korean name
- Hangul: 인조
- Hanja: 仁祖
- Lit.: "Benevolent Progenitor"
- RR: Injo
- MR: Injo

Royal title
- Hangul: 능양군
- Hanja: 綾陽君
- RR: Neungyanggun
- MR: Nŭngyanggun

Art name
- Hangul: 송창
- Hanja: 松窓
- RR: Songchang
- MR: Songch'ang

Courtesy name
- Hangul: 천윤, 화백
- Hanja: 天胤, 和伯
- RR: Cheonyun, Hwabaek
- MR: Ch'ŏnyun, Hwabaek

Injo (Korean: 인조; Hanja: 仁祖; 7 December 1595 – 17 June 1649), (Note: In the Korean calendar (lunisolar), he was born on the 7th day of the 11th lunar month and died on the 8th day of the 5th lunar month.) personal name Yi Jong, was the 16th monarch of Joseon. He was the eldest son of Prince Jeongwon and a grandson of King Seonjo, and acceded to the throne after leading a coup d'état against his uncle, Gwanghaegun. Today, he is considered a weak and incompetent king, as during his reign the country experienced Yi Kwal's Rebellion, the Later Jin invasion, the Qing invasion, and an economic recession, while the government was corrupt and ineffective.

== Biography ==
=== Birth and background ===
King Injo was born in 1595 as a son of Prince Jeongwon, whose father was the ruling monarch King Seonjo. In 1607, Prince Jeongwon's son was given the title, Lord Neungyang (綾陽都正, 능양도정) and later Prince Neungyang (綾陽君, 능양군); and lived as a royal family member, unsupported by any political factions that were in control of Korean politics at the time.

In 1608, King Seonjo fell sick and died, and his son, Gwanghaegun, succeeded him to the throne. At the time, the government was divided by various political factions and the liberal Easterner political faction came out strong after the Japanese invasions of 1582–1598, as they fought most actively against the Japanese. The Eastern faction split during the last days of King Seonjo into the Northerner and Southerner political factions. The Northern faction wanted radical reform, while the Southerner faction supported more moderate measures. At the time of Seonjo's death, the Northern faction, which gained control of the government at the time, was divided into left-wing Greater Northerners and more moderate Lesser Northerners. As Gwanghaegun inherited the throne, the Greater Northern political faction, which supported him as heir to the crown, became the major political faction in the royal court. Meanwhile, the conservative Westerner political faction remained a minor player, unable to gain power; however many members of the Westerner faction continued to look for opportunities to return to politics as the ruling faction.

=== The coup of 1623 ===
Although King Gwanghaegun was an outstanding administrator and great diplomat, he was largely unsupported by many politicians, scholars, and aristocrats because he was not the first-born and he was born of a concubine. Greater Northerners tried to stomp out those opinions, suppressing Lesser Northerners and killing Prince Imhae, the oldest son of Seonjo, and Grand Prince Yeongchang, the queen's son. It was not Gwanghaegun's plan to keep his throne; and in fact, he actually tried to bring minor factions into the government, but was blocked by opposition from members of the Greater Northerners, such as Chŏng Inhong and Yi Ich'ŏm. The actions made Gwanghaegun even more unpopular among wealthy aristocrats, and they finally began plotting against him.

In 1623, members of the ultra-conservative Westerners, Kim Chajŏm, Kim Ryu, Yi Kwi and Yi Kwal, launched a coup that resulted in the dethroning of Gwanghaegun, who was sent into exile on Jeju Island. Chŏng Inhong and Yi Ich'ŏm were killed, and this was followed suddenly by the Westerners replacing the Greater Northerners as the ruling political faction. The Westerners brought Injo to the palace and crowned him as the new King of Joseon. Although Injo was king, he did not have any authority since almost all of the power was held by the Westerners that had dethroned Gwanghaegun.

=== Yi Kwal's Rebellion ===
Yi Kwal thought he was mistreated and received too small a reward for his role in the coup. In 1624, he rebelled against Injo after being sent to the Northern front as military commander of Pyongyang to fight against the expanding Manchus, while other significant leaders of the coup were rewarded with positions in the King's court. Yi Kwal led 12,000 troops, including 100 Japanese (who defected to Joseon during Japanese invasions of Korea), to the capital, Hansŏng, where Yi Kwal defeated a regular army under the command of General Chang Man and surrounded Hansŏng. Injo fled to Gongju, and Hansŏng fell into the hands of the rebels.

On February 11, 1624, Yi Kwal enthroned Prince Heungan (興安君, 흥안군) as the new King. However, General Chang Man soon returned with another regiment and defeated Yi's forces. The Korean army recaptured the capital soon after, and Yi was murdered by his bodyguard, ending the rebellion. Even though Injo kept his throne, the uprising displayed the weaknesses of royal authority while asserting the superiority of the aristocrats, who had gained even more power by fighting against the rebellion. The economy, which was experiencing a slight recovery from Gwanghaegun's reconstruction, was again ruined, and Korea would remain in a poor economic state for a few centuries.

=== War with Later Jin and Qing ===
King Gwanghaegun, who was considered a wise diplomat, kept his neutral policy between the Ming dynasty, which was Joseon's traditional ally, and the growing Jurchens (later Manchus and Qing dynasty). However, following the fall of Gwanghaegun, conservative Westerners took a hard-line policy toward the Jurchen-led Later Jin dynasty, keeping their alliance with Ming dynasty. The Later Jin, who had up until that time remained mostly friendly to Joseon, began to regard Joseon as an enemy. Han Yun, who participated in the rebellion of Yi Kwal, fled to Manchuria and urged the Later Jin ruler Nurhaci to attack Joseon; thus the friendly relationship between the Later Jin and Joseon ended.

In 1627, 30,000 Manchu cavalry under General Amin and former Korean General Gang Hong-rip invaded Joseon, calling for the restoration of Gwanghaegun and the execution of Westerners leaders, including Kim Chajŏm. General Chang Man again fought against the Later Jin, but was unable to repel the invasion. Once again, Injo fled to Ganghwa Island. Meanwhile, the Later Jin had no reason to attack Joseon and decided to go back to prepare for war against the Ming, and peace soon settled. The Later Jin and Joseon dynasties were declared brother nations and the Later Jin withdrew from the Korean peninsula.

However, most Westerners kept their hard-line policy despite the war. Nurhaci, who had generally good opinion toward Korea, did not invade Korea again; however, when Nurhaci died and Hong Taiji succeeded him as ruler, the Later Jin again began to seek another chance for war. King Injo provided refuge to Ming general Mao Wenlong and with his unit, after they fled from the Later Jin and came to Korea; this action caused the Later Jin to invade Korea once again.

In 1636, Hong Taiji officially renamed his dynasty the Qing dynasty, and proceeded to invade Joseon personally. The Qing forces purposely avoided battle with General Im Gyeong-eop, a prominent Joseon army commander who was guarding the Uiju Fortress at the time. A Qing army of 128,000 men marched directly into Hanseong before Injo could escape to Ganghwa Island, driving Injo to Namhan Mountain Fortress instead. Running out of food and supplies after the Manchu managed to cut all supply lines, Injo finally surrendered to the Qing dynasty ceremoniously bowing to the Hong Taiji nine times as Hong Taiji's servant, and agreeing to the Treaty of Samjeondo, which required Injo's first and second son to be taken to China as captives.

Joseon then became a tributary state to the Qing, which went on to conquer the Ming dynasty in 1644.

=== Death of the Crown Prince ===
After Qing conquered Beijing in 1644, the two princes returned to Korea. Injo's first son, Crown Prince Sohyeon, brought many new products from the western world, including Christianity, and urged Injo for reform. However, the conservative Injo would not accept his ideas and persecuted the Crown Prince for attempting to bring in foreign Catholicism and Western science into Korea.

The Crown Prince was mysteriously found dead in the King's room, bleeding severely from the head. Legends say that Injo killed his own son with an ink slab that Sohyeon brought from China; however, some historians suggest he was poisoned by the fact that he had black spots all over his body after his death and that his body decomposed rapidly. Many, including his wife, tried to uncover what happened but Injo ordered immediate burial and greatly reduced the grandeur of the practice of Crown Prince's funeral. King Injo even shortened the funeral period for his son. Later, Injo also executed Sohyeon's wife who tried to find out the real reason for her husband's death.

King Injo appointed Grand Prince Bongrim as new Crown Prince (who later became King Hyojong) rather than Prince Sohyeon's oldest son, Prince Gyeongseon. Soon after, Injo ordered the exile of Prince Sohyeon's three sons to Jeju Island (from which only the youngest son, Prince Gyeongan, returned to the mainland alive) and the execution of Sohyeon's wife, Crown Princess Minhoe, for treason.

== Legacy ==
Today, Injo is mostly regarded as a weak, indecisive and unstable ruler; for he caused the Yi Kwal Rebellion, two wars with the Qing dynasty, and a devastation of the economy. He is often compared negatively to his predecessor, Gwanghaegun, who was dethroned, while Injo had almost no achievements during his reign and was still given a temple name. Blamed for not taking care of his kingdom, many people regard King Injo as a model for politicians not to follow; yet, he is credited for reforming the military and expanding the defense of the nation to prepare for war, since the nation had several military conflicts from 1592 to 1636. Injo died in 1649. His tomb is located in Paju, Gyeonggi Province.

== Family ==
- Father: King Wonjong (원종대왕; 12 August 1580 – 23 January 1620)
  - Grandfather: King Seonjo (선조대왕; 6 December 1552 – 16 March 1608)
  - Biological grandmother: Concubine In (인빈), of the Suwon Kim clan (수원 김씨; 31 March 1555 – 30 November 1613)
  - Adoptive grandmother: Queen Uiin (의인왕후), of the Bannam Park clan (반남 박씨; 15 May 1555 – 26 July 1600)
  - Step-grandmother: Queen Inmok (인목왕후), of the Yonan Kim clan (연안 김씨; 15 December 1584 – 13 August 1632)
- Mother: Queen Inheon (인헌왕후), of the Neungseong Gu clan (능성 구씨; 2 June 1578 – 10 February 1626)
  - Grandfather: Gu Sa-maeng (구사맹), Internal Prince Neungan (능안부원군; 1531–1604)
  - Grandmother: Internal Princess Consort Pyongsan (평산부부인), of the Pyongsan Shin clan (평산 신씨; 1538–1622)

Consort(s) and their respective issue

- Queen Inyeol (인렬왕후), of the Cheongju Han clan (청주 한씨; 16 August 1594 – 16 January 1636)
  - Yi Wang (이왕), Crown Prince Sohyeon (소현세자; 5 February 1612 – 21 May 1645), first son
  - Yi Ho (이호), King Hyojong (효종대왕; 3 July 1619 – 23 June 1659), second son
  - Yi Yo (이요), Grand Prince Inpyeong (인평대군; 10 January 1623 – 13 June 1658), third son
  - Yi Gon (이곤), Grand Prince Yongseong (용성대군; 14 October 1624 – 22 December 1629), fourth son
  - Unnamed daughter (1626)
  - Unnamed son (1629)
  - Unnamed son (1636)
- Queen Jangnyeol (장렬왕후), of the Yangju Jo clan (양주 조씨; 16 December 1624 – 20 September 1688)
- Gwiin (귀인), of the Sunchang Jo clan (순창 조씨; c. 1619 – 24 January 1652)
  - Princess Hyomyeong (효명옹주; 1638–1700), first daughter
  - Yi Jing (이징), Prince Sungseon (숭선군; 11 November 1639 – 14 February 1690), fifth son
  - Yi Suk (이숙), Prince Nakseon (낙선군; 9 December 1641 – 26 April 1695), sixth son
- Gwiin (귀인), of the Deoksu Jang clan (덕수 장씨; 29 April 1619 – 4 March 1671)
- Sugui (숙의), of the Na clan (나씨)
- Sugui (숙의), of the Park clan (박씨)
- Palace Lady (상궁), of the Yi clan (이씨; ?–1643), given name Jeong-min (정민) (Note: Sanggung (상궁; 尚宫); female official of the senior fifth rank in the internal court.)
- Palace Lady (궁인), of the Goseong Yi clan (고성 이씨)

== Ancestry ==
Ancestors of Injo of Joseon

King Jungjong (중종대왕)
Grand Internal Prince Deokheung (덕흥대원군)
Concubine Chang, of the Ansan An clan (창빈 안산 안씨)
King Seonjo (선조대왕)
Jeong Se-ho (정세호)
Grand Internal Princess Consort Hadong, of the Hadong Jeong clan (하동부대부인 하동 정씨)
Lady, of the Gwangju Yi clan (광주 이씨)
King Wonjong (원종대왕)
Kim Sun-eun (김순은)
Kim Han-u (김한우)
Lady, of the Goryeong Park clan (고령 박씨)
Concubine In, of the Suwon Kim clan (인빈 수원 김씨)
Yi Hyo-sung (이효성)
Lady, of the Jeonju Yi clan (전주 이씨)
King Injo
Gu Hui-gyeong (구희경)
Gu Sun (구순)
Lady, of the Geochang Shin clan (거창 신씨)
Gu Sa-maeng, Internal Prince Neungan (능안부원군 구사맹)
Yi Jing-won, Prince Uisin (의신군 이징원)
Lady, of the Jeonju Yi clan (전주 이씨)
Queen Inheon, of the Neungseong Gu clan (인헌왕후 능성 구씨)
Shin Hwa-guk (신화국)
Lady, of the Jeonju Yi clan (전주 이씨)
Internal Princess Consort Pyongsan, of the Pyongsan Shin clan (평산부부인 평산 신씨)
Lady, of the Papyeong Yun clan (파평 윤씨)

== In popular culture ==
- Portrayed by Kim Dong-hoon in the 1981 KBS1 TV series Daemyeong.
- Portrayed by Yu In-chon in the 1986–1987 MBC TV series 500 Years of Joseon: Namhan Mountain Fortress.
- Portrayed by Ahn Dae-yong in 1995 KBS2 TV series West Palace.
- Portrayed by Lee Byung-joon in the 2000–2002 MBC TV series Tamra, the Island.
- Portrayed by Kim Chang-wan in the 2008 SBS TV series Iljimae.
- Portrayed by Choi Jung-woo in the 2008 KBS2 TV series Strongest Chil Woo.
- Portrayed by Kim Kap-soo in the 2010 KBS2 TV series The Slave Hunters.
- Portrayed by Sunwoo Jae-duk in the 2012–2013 MBC TV series The King's Doctor.
- Portrayed by Lee Deok-hwa in the 2013 JTBC TV series Blooded Palace: The War of Flowers.
- Portrayed by Kim Myung-soo in the 2014 tvN TV series The Three Musketeers.
- Portrayed by Kim Jae-won in the 2015 MBC TV series Splendid Politics.
- Portrayed by Park Hae-il in the 2017 film The Fortress.
- Portrayed by Kang Tae-oh in the 2019 KBS2 TV series The Tale of Nokdu.
- portrayed by Lee Min-jae in 2021 MBN TV series Bossam: Steal the Fate.
- Portrayed by Jo Kwan-woo in the 2021 tvN TV series Secret Royal Inspector & Joy.
- Portrayed by Yoo Hae-jin in the 2022 film The Night Owl.
- Portrayed by Kim Jong-tae in the 2023 MBC TV series My Dearest.

== See also ==
- History of Korea
- List of monarchs of Korea
- Styles and titles in Joseon
- Politics of Joseon

== Notes ==
Injo of Joseon House of Yi Born: 7 December 1595 Died: 17 June 1649
Royal titles
Preceded by Gwanghaegun	King of Joseon; 13 April 1623 – 17 June 1649	Succeeded by Hyojong
