= Hwang (surname) =

Korean family name (황)

- Hangul: 황
- Hanja: 黃
- RR: Hwang
- MR: Hwang

Hwang or Whang (or in some cases, Whong) is a Korean family name. Today, Hwangs comprise approximately 1.4% of the Korean population. The South Korean census in the year 2000 found that there were 644,294 Hwangs with over 68 Bon-gwan family clans, making it the 16th most common last name in the country. Also, it is estimated that there are over 29,410,000 individuals whose last names are the variations of Huang, including the Korean Hwang and the Vietnamese Hoang around the world. The Chinese character, or Hanja, for Hwang indicates "yellow" or "Huang Kingdom".

== Bon-gwan ==
In the traditional Korean clan system, which remains as the basis of the family registry system in South Korea, each clan is distinguished by its bon-gwan (본관,本貫). Each bon-gwan in Korea originates from the clan progenitor's settlement, which can be explained as the traditional home of the family clan's first male ancestor. Typically in Korea, a last name includes many distinct bon-gwans, which leads to the last name becoming a broad umbrella designation that involves numerous family clans. Therefore, individuals with Korean descent may be completely unrelated even if their last names are identical, depending on their family clan, or bon-gwan. In the Korean language, Bon-gwans are expressed before the family name when necessary and often involves the family progenitor's first settlement as the name of the bon-gwan. The last name is referred to as the Ssi (씨-氏) in Korean. This arranges every Korean family clan name as bon-gwan ssi, or in other words, family clan - last name.

== History ==
The Korean Hwang surname originates from a Chinese Han dynasty's diplomatic ambassador to Vietnam, named Hwang Rak (황락,黃洛). Hwang Rak is recorded in AD 28 as having become lost at sea during a voyage from China to Vietnam, and instead having arrived in Korea during the Silla dynasty. Hwang Rak arrived at a place in Korea called Pyeong-Hae (평해,平海), located in the Eastern province of GyeongSang-BukDo, as currently known in South Korea. Upon settling in Pyeong-Hae, Hwang Rak naturalized as a Silla citizen and became the first progenitor of the last name Hwang (황) in Korea. His grave is located at GulMi-Bong (봉, 峰, peak), 423-8 BunJi, Wolsong-Ri, PyeongHae-Eub, WolJin-Kun, KyeongSang-BukDo, Republic of Korea, but only the altar of the grave remains as a marker.

Before his death, Hwang-Rak had three sons named Gab-Go (갑고,甲古), Eul-Go (을고,乙古), and Byung-Go (병고,丙古), from eldest to youngest. Gab-Go, the oldest son, is recorded as having remained in Pyeong-Hae, continuing the main Pyeong-Hae family clan. The second son, Eul-Go, is said to have left home Westwards and eventually settled in Jang-Su, becoming the first progenitor of the Jang-Su Hwang family clan. The third and youngest son, Byung-Go, is said to have settled in Chang-Won, becoming the first progenitor of the Chang-Won Hwang family clan. These migrations of the two sons have resulted in the three major Bon-gwans being created under the Hwang family name.

== Notable clans ==
- Changwon Hwang clan - 252,814 members.
- Jangsu Hwang clan - 146,575 members.
- Pyeonghae Hwang clan - 137,150 members.
- Hoideok Hwang clan - 7,393 members.
- Sangju Hwang clan - 7,031 members.
- Deoksan Hwang clan - 3,364 members.
- Jaeahn Hwang clan - 2,752 members.
- Hangjoo Hwang clan - 402 members.

All figures are from the 2000 South Korean census.

To this day, the three primary branches of the Hwang family are the Chang-Won (창원황씨,昌原黃氏), Jang-Su (장수황씨,張水黃氏), and Pyeonghae (평해황씨,平海黃氏) clans, with the largest member counts of the 55 Hwang clans.

== Notable people ==
- Hwang Ah-hyeon (born 2001), South Korean professional footballer
- Hwang Bo-ra (born 1983), South Korean actress
- Hwang Boreum, South Korean writer
- Hwang Bo-reum-byeol (born 1999), South Korean actress and model
- Hwang Byeong-geun (born 1994), South Korean footballer
- Hwang Byeong-gwan (1919–1952), South Korean wrestler
- Hwang Byung-dae (born 1960), South Korean skier
- Hwang Byungki (1936–2018), South Korean musician
- Hwang Byungsng (1936–2018), South Korean poet
- Hwang Chan-sung (born 1990), South Korean singer and actor, member of boy band 2PM
- Hwang Chi-yeul (born 1982), South Korean singer
- Hwang Dae-heon (born 1999), South Korean short track speed skater, Olympic gold medalist
- David Henry Hwang (born 1957), American playwright, librettist, screenwriter, and theater professor
- Dennis Hwang (born c. 1978), American-born South Korean graphic artist
- Hwang Do-yun (born 2003), South Korean footballer
- Hwang Dong-hyuk (born 1971), South Korean director, screenwriter and producer
- Hwang Eun-bi (stage name SinB, born 1998), South Korean singer, member of girl group Viviz
- Hwang Geum-hee (born 1977), South Korean actress
- Harold Y. Hwang (born 1970), American physicist
- Hwang Hee-chan (born 1996), South Korean professional footballer
- Hwang Hui (1363–1452), politician of the Goryeo and Joseon dynasties
- Hwang Hye-youn (born 1985), South Korean retired badminton player
- Hwang Hyun-hee (born 1988), South Korean actress and model
- Hwang Hyun-jin (born 2000), South Korean rapper, singer, dancer, member of boy band Stray Kids
- D Hwang (born Hwang Ildong, 1969) South Korean sculptor and painter
- Hwang In-beom (born 1996), South Korean professional footballer
- Hwang In-ho, South Korean film director and screenwriter
- Hwang In-shik (born 1940), South Korean actor and hapkido teacher
- Hwang In-suk (born 1958), South Korean poet
- Hwang In-sung (1926-2010), South Korean soldier and politician
- Hwang In-sun (born 1987), South Korean singer and television personality
- Hwang In-young (born 1978), South Korean actress
- Hwang In-youp (born 1991), South Korean actor, model, singer
- Hwang Jae-hun (footballer, born 1986), South Korean footballer
- Hwang Jae-hun (footballer, born 1990), South Korean footballer
- Hwang Jae-hwan (born 2001), South Korean footballer
- Hwang Jae-man (1953–2010), South Korean former football player and manager
- Hwang Jang-lee (1944–2026), Japanese-born South Korean martial artist and actor
- Hwang Jang-yop (1923–2010), North Korean politician and defector
- Hwang Jini (1506–1567), kisaeng of the Joseon dynasty
- Hwang Jin-sung (born 1984), South Korean footballer
- Hwang Jin-woo (born 1983), South Korean auto racing driver
- Hwang Jung-eum (born 1984), South Korean actress and singer
- Hwang Jung-eun (born 1976), South Korean writer and podcaster
- Hwang Jung-min (born 1970), South Korean actor
- Hwang Jung-oh (born 1958), South Korean retired judoka, Olympic silver medalist
- Jun-Muk Hwang (born 1963), South Korean mathematician
- Hwang Jun-seok, South Korean engineer
- Hwang Kwang-hee (born 1988), South Korean singer
- Hwang Kyo-ahn (born 1957), South Korean politician and prosecutor
- Lexy (singer) (born Hwang Hyo-sook, 1979), South Korean singer
- Hwang Min-hyun (born 1995), South Korean singer
- Hwang Min-woo (born 2005), South Korean actor best known for his appearance in the music video for Gangnam Style
- Serra Miyeun Hwang (born 1962), American composer
- Hwang Pyong-so (born c. 1946), North Korean general and politician
- Hwang Seok-ho (born 1989), South Korean professional footballer
- Hwang Seok-jeong (born 1971), South Korean actress
- Hwang Seok-keun (born 1960), South Korean former footballer
- Hwang Seon-a (born 1989), South Korean fencer
- Hwang Seon-mi (born 1963), South Korean author and professor
- Hwang Seong-eun (born 1993), South Korean sport shooter
- Hwang Seong-gu (born 1973), South Korean screenwriter
- Hwang Seung-eon (born 1988), South Korean actress, model, singer
- Hwang_Shin-hye (born 1963), South Korean actress
- Hwang Sok-yong (born 1943), South Korean author
- Hwang Sun-hong (born 1968), South Korean football manager and former player
- Hwang Sun-hee (born 1986), South Korean actress
- Hwang Sun-won (1915–2000), South Korean author
- Hwang Sun-woo (born 2003), South Korean swimmer
- Hwang Sung-bum (born 1975), South Korean boxer
- Hwang Sung-kook (born 1964), South Korean-born American investor, trader and convicted fraudster
- Hwang Sung-min (born 1991), South Korean footballer
- Tiffany Young (born Stephanie Young Hwang, 1989), American singer-songwriter, member of girl group Girls' Generation
- Tim (singer) (born Hwang Young-min, 1981), Korean-American singer
- Hwang Ui-jo (born 1992), South Korean professional footballer
- Hwang Woo-seul-hye (born 1979), South Korean actress
- Hwang Woo-suk (born 1953), South Korean veterinarian and researcher
- Hwang Ye-ji (born 2000), South Korean singer, member of girl group Itzy
- Hwang Youn-joo (born 1986), South Korean volleyball player
- Hwang Young-cho (born 1970), South Korean former long-distance runner, Olympic gold medalist
- Hwang Young-cheul (born 1965), South Korean politician
- Hwang Young-ha (1939–2024), South Korean civil servant and politician
- Hwang Young-hee (born 1969), South Korean actress and model
- Hwang Young-shik (born 1990), South Korean equestrian athlete
- Hwang Yu-mi (born 1983), South Korean former badminton player
- Hwang Yun-gil (1536–?), Joseon diplomat and ambassador
- Zion Hwang (born 1997/1998), South Korean-Colombian singer-songwriter

=== Fictional characters ===
- Hwang In-ho, the main antagonist of the television series Squid Game
- Hwang Seong-gyeong, a video game character who first appeared in Soul Edge

== See also ==
- List of Korean family names
- Korean name
- Korean culture
- Korean language
- Huang (surname)
