= Mo (Korean surname) =

Korean family name

- Hangul: 모
- Hanja: 牟; 毛
- RR: Mo
- MR: Mo

Mo (Korean: 모) is an uncommon Korean surname. It originated from either of two hanja 牟 or 毛), which are also used respectively to write the Chinese surnames Móu or Máo. The 2000 South Korean census found a total of 19,834 people and 6,110 households with these surnames. The surname is spelled Mo in all standard methods of romanizing the Korean language. In a study by the National Institute of the Korean Language based on 2007 application data for South Korean passports, all the applicants spelled this surname as Mo. The alternative spelling Moh is occasionally seen.

== More common lineage ==
Bori Mo (보리 모; 牟; lit. '"barley"'), also called so uneun sori Mo (소 우는 소리 모; 牟; lit. '"the sound that a cow makes"'), is the more common of the two hanja used to write the surname Mo. This character was originally used to write a Chinese surname now pronounced Móu in Mandarin. In 1960 it was the 92nd-most common surname in South Korea, falling to 93rd by 1985. The 2000 South Korean census found 18,955 people with this family name, and 5,838 households. The surviving bon-gwan (origin of a clan lineages, not necessarily the current residence of clan members) at that time included:

- Hampyeong, South Jeolla (see Hampyeong Mo clan): 17,939 people and 5,546 households. They claim descent from Mo Kyŏng (모경; 牟慶), who came from the Hongnong Commandery (in present-day Henan), China to Korea, and aided in suppressing the rebellion by Yi Cha-gyŏm during the reign of Injong of Goryeo.
- Jinju, South Gyeongsang: 972 people and 285 households. They are likely a branch of the Hampyeong Mo clan. They claim descent from Mo Sun (모순; 牟恂), an official during the reign of Taejo of Joseon.
- Naju, South Jeolla: Two people and zero households.
- Other or unknown: 34 people and seven households.

== Less common lineage ==
Teoreok Mo (터럭 모; 毛; lit. '"hair"') is the less common of the two hanja used to write the surname Mo. This character was originally used to write a Chinese surname now pronounced Máo in Mandarin. In 1960 it was the 146th-most common surname in South Korea, falling to 164th by 1985. The 2000 South Korean census found 879 people with this family name, and 272 households. The surviving bon-gwan at that time included:

- Gongju, South Chungcheong: 352 people and 114 households. The founding ancestor of the clan is not known.
- Guangzhou, China: 309 people and 95 households. Members of the Gwangju Mo clan (Note: Gwangju is the Sino-Korean pronunciation of Guangzhou; not to be confused with Gwangju Metropolitan City or Gwangju, Gyeonggi, both in South Korea.) claim distant ancestry from China, where this surname originated in the Xihe Commandery (present-day Shaanxi). It is not clear when the founding ancestor brought the surname to the Korean Peninsula or where he lived, but it is believed to be somewhere in Chongju, North Pyongan. (Note: An area which became part of North Korea after the division of Korea)
- Gimhae, South Gyeongsang: 101 people and 28 households.
- Seosan, South Chungcheong: 91 people and 26 households.
- Other or unknown: 26 people and nine households. "Other" includes people listing their bon-gwan as Jeonju, North Jeolla; Papyeong, Gyeonggi; Pyeonghae, North Gyeongsang; Hamyeol, North Jeolla; and Haepyeong, North Gyeongsang.

== People ==
''

People with this surname include:

- Mike Moh (born 1983), American actor and martial artist
- Moh Youn-sook (1910–1990), South Korean poet
- Mo Myeong-hui (born 1963), South Korean sprinter
- Mo Ji-soo (born 1969), South Korean speed skater
- Mo Joong-kyung (born 1971), South Korean golfer
- Mo Chang-min (born 1985), South Korean baseball player
- Mo Tae-bum (born 1989), South Korean speed skater
- Mo Jae-hyeon (born 1996), South Korean footballer
- Mo Ji-hye (born 2005), South Korean-Australian singer, member of girl band NewJeans under the name Danielle

== See also ==
- Category:Mo clans
