= Gyeongju Yun clan =

Korean clan from North Gyeongsang Province

- Country: Korea
- Current region: Gyeongju
- Founder: Yun Tong

Gyeongju Yun clan (Korean: 경주 윤씨; Hanja: 慶州 尹氏) was one of the Korean clans. Their Bon-gwan was in Gyeongju, North Gyeongsang Province. According to the research in 2000, the number of Gyeongju Yun clan was 1684. Gyeongju Yun clan was separated from Haeju Yun clan. Their founder was Yun Tong. He was a son of Yun Gong (Hanja: 尹恭) who was immigrated from Ming dynasty to Joseon during Taejo of Joseon’s reign. He was a nephew of Yun Sin (Hanja: 尹信) who had a government post named (Hanja: 府尹, fuyin) in Ming dynasty.

== See also ==
- Korean clan names of foreign origin
