= Crown Princess Gonghoe =

Crown Princess of Joseon (1553–1592)

Crown Princess of Joseon
- Tenure: 27 November 1561 – 16 October 1563
- Investiture: Myeongjeongjeon, Changgyeonggung
- Predecessor: Crown Princess Park
- Successor: Crown Princess Yu
- Born: 21 July 1553; Hanseong, Joseon
- Died: 14 April 1592 (aged 38); Tongmyeongjeon, Changgyeonggung, Hanseong, Joseon
- Burial: Sunchangwon, Seooreung Cluster, Goyang, South Korea
- Spouse: Crown Prince Sunhoe (m. 1561; died 1563)
Posthumous name
- Crown Princess Gonghoe (공회빈; 恭懷嬪)
- Clan: Musong Yun (by birth); Jeonju Yi (by marriage)
- Dynasty: Yi
- Father: Yun Ok
- Mother: Lady, of the Papyeong Yun clan
- Religion: Buddhism

Korean name
- Hangul: 공회빈
- Hanja: 恭懷嬪
- RR: Gonghoebin
- MR: Konghoebin

Crown Princess Gonghoe (Korean: 공회빈; Hanja: 恭懷嬪; 21 July 1553 – 14 April 1592), of the Musong Yun clan, was the wife of Crown Prince Sunhoe, the only son of King Myeongjong. Following the death of her husband, she was known as Crown Princess Deok.

== Biography ==
=== Early life and lineage ===
The future Crown Princess Gonghoe was born during the reign of King Myeongjong, as the second daughter among two sons and three daughters. Her father was Yun Ok (윤옥) and her mother was a lady from the influential Papyeong Yun clan (파평 윤씨).

=== Marriage ===
In 1559, King Myeongjong ordered the selection of a bride for his only son, Yi Bu. The king's maternal uncle, Yun Won-hyeong, attempted to retain control of the royal court through this marriage and claimed that one of his relatives, a lady from the Changwon Hwang clan, would be the best candidate. Yun Won-hyeong hid the fact that Lady Hwang suffered from a chronic disease, and she was successfully chosen as crown princess, with the marriage rites being completed as of early 1561. However, when it became clear that Lady Hwang experienced prolonged abdominal pain of severe intensity, Myeongjong considered it unacceptable to allow a seriously ill girl to be the future queen. The marriage was immediately cancelled, Lady Hwang was demoted to consort rank and another selection was held.

In 1561, Lady Yun was chosen as the new crown princess and the wedding took place that same same year. Unfortunately, the crown prince (posthumously Crown Prince Sunhoe) then fell seriously ill, dying prematurely less than two years later.

=== Widowhood ===
Lady Yun, widowed at the age of 10, became known as Crown Princess Deok (덕빈) and was specifically allowed to remain in the palace.

King Myeongjong died in 1567 and was succeeded by his adopted son (posthumously King Seonjo). In 1569, Seonjo married Lady Park (posthumously Queen Uiin); from then on, there were four female members of the royal family living in the palace: Queen Inseong (then known as Queen Dowager Gongui; wife of King Injong), Queen Insun (then known as Queen Dowager Uiseong; wife of King Myeongjong), Lady Yun and Queen Park. During his early reign, King Seonjo had yet to name a crown prince, so Lady Yun continued to reside in her late husband's quarters.

It is recorded that Lady Yun was quite educated, able to teach the royal consorts. In addition, she was a pious Buddhist, often praying and holding religious ceremonies for her late husband and the royal family.

After Lady Yun's marriage, her father, Yun Ok, had taken up a post in the Six Ministries, but eventually fell into disrepute due to corruption. Decades prior, Yun Ok had embezzled grain from the Honam and Yeongnam regions, and exchanged the crops for a considerable amount of cotton cloth. The misconduct was revealed in 1580 and King Seonjo dismissed Yun Ok from office, but refused to punish him further as the cloth had been used for the royal wedding, making it impossible to return the unjust enrichment even by confiscating all of Yun Ok's property.

=== Death and aftermath ===
Lady Yun died at the age of 38, having survived her husband by 28 years, and was conferred the posthumous name Gonghoe (공회; lit. ''to reverently cherish'').

Soon after her death, the Japanese invaded Joseon and King Seonjo fled the capital. The grave goods in Lady Yun's funeral hall were looted, and before the officials could temporarily bury her coffin in the Hamchunwon (함춘원) garden, Changgyeonggung was burned down.

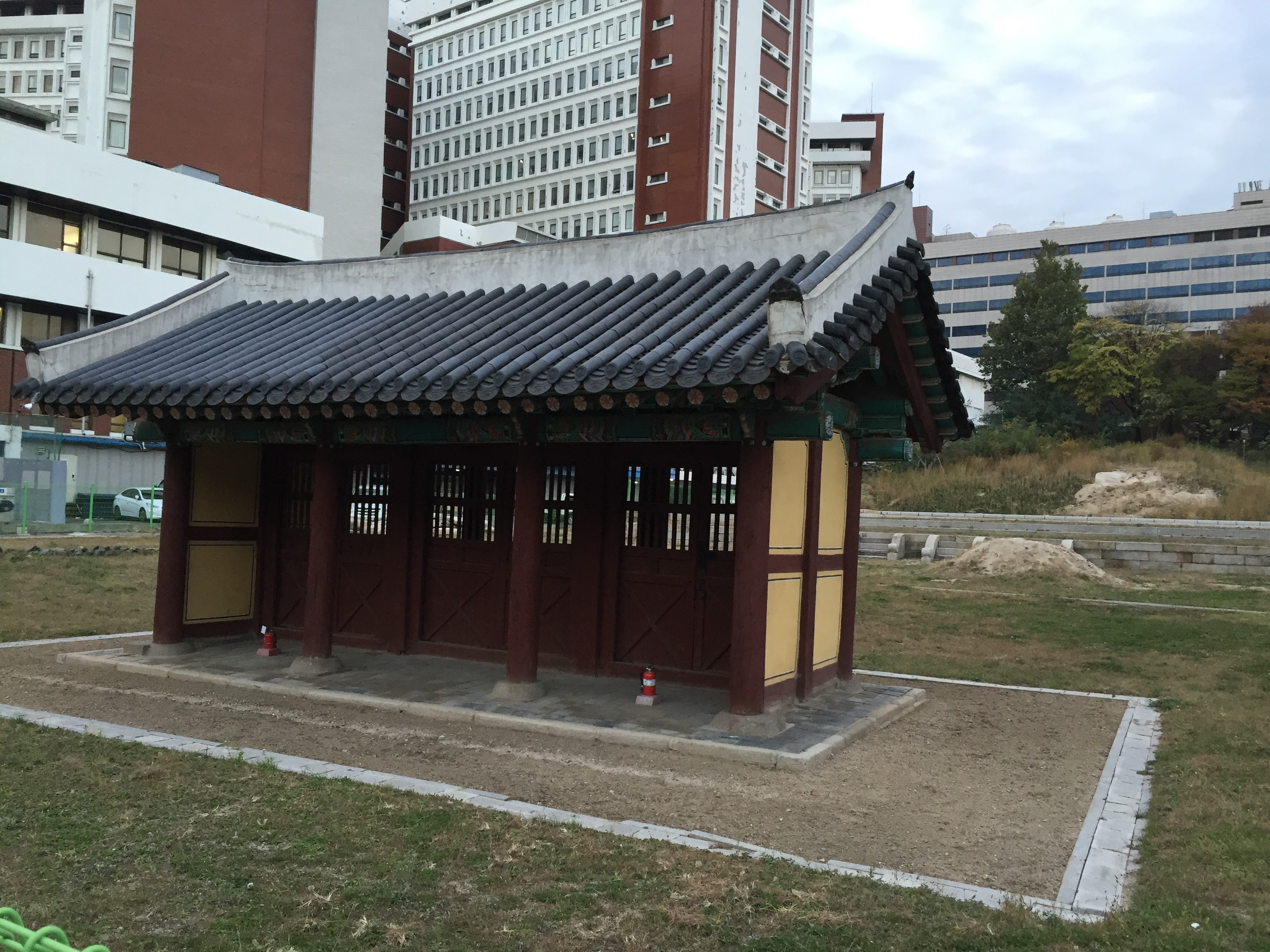
Hamchunmun, the surviving gate of Hamchunwon on the grounds of Seoul National University Hospital

At the time of King Seonjo's return in 1593, Lady Yun's coffin was missing, perhaps burned in the fire. A surviving palace lady claimed that as Lady Yun was a pious Buddhist, such a cremation would be in accordance with her last wishes. Seonjo attempted to retrieve her body from the presumed burial place, but only non-human bones were discovered.

Despite Lady Yun's remains never being found, officials were still tasked with arranging her funeral rites and an empty coffin was buried alongside Crown Prince Sunhoe within Sunhoemyo (순회묘), today part of the Seooreung Cluster in Goyang, Gyeonggi Province. In 1871, the tomb was renamed Sunchangwon (순창원) by King Gojong.

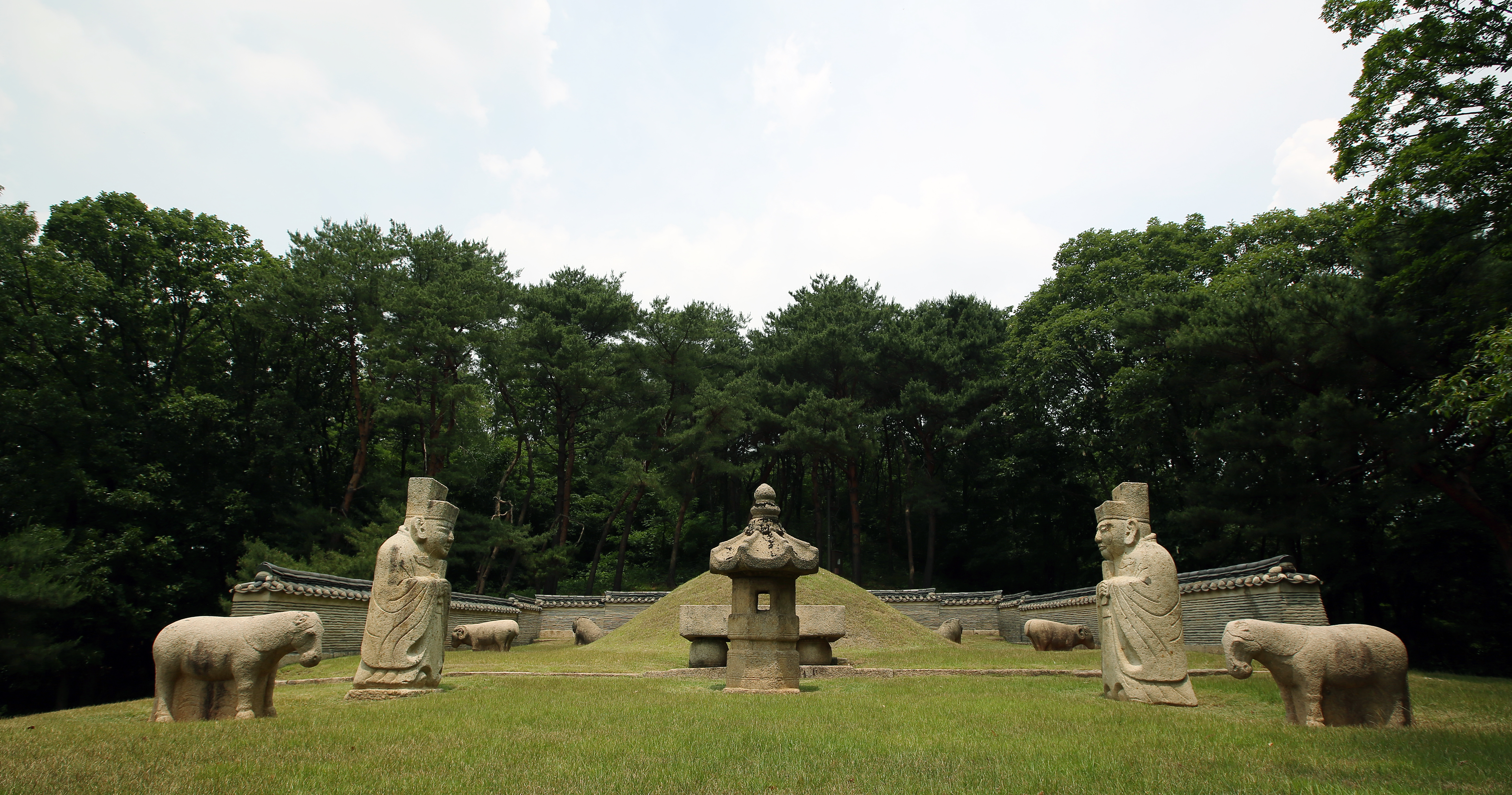
The join burial mound of the couple

The spirit tablets of Lady Yun and Crown Prince Sunhoe were also enshrined in 1603, but they disappeared on Ganghwa Island during the Qing invasion.

== Titles ==
- During the reign of King Myeongjong (r. 1445–1567):
  - Lady, of the Musong Yun clan (무송 윤씨; 茂松尹氏; from 21 July 1553)
    - Yun Ok's daughter (윤옥의 딸)
    - Lady Yun (윤씨; 尹氏)
  - Crown Princess (왕세제빈; 王世弟嬪; from 27 November 1561)
  - Crown Princess Deok (덕빈; 德嬪; from 1563)
- During the reign of King Seonjo (r. 1567–1608):
  - Crown Princess Gonghoe (공회빈; 恭懷嬪; from 1592)

== Family ==
- Father: Yun Ok (윤옥; 1511–1584)
- Mother: Lady, of the Papyeong Yun clan (파평 윤씨; ?–1572)
- Sibling(s)
  - Lady, of the Musong Yun clan (무송 윤씨; 1539–?) (Note: Married Gu Sa-yeol (구사열) from the Neungseong Gu clan (능성 구씨); second cousin of Gu Sa-maeng and a descendant of King Sejong. [Lineage: King Sejong → Grand Prince Yeongeung (영응대군; 1434–1467) → County Princess Gilan (길안현주; 1457–1519) → Gu Sung-gyeong (구숭경) → Gu Jun (구준) → Gu Sa-yeol])
  - Yun Baek-sun (윤백순; 1552–?) (Note: ▪︎Wife: Lady, of the Jeonju Yi clan (전주 이씨), given name Cheon-yi (천이).)
  - Lady, of the Musong Yun clan (무송 윤씨; 1555–?) (Note: Married Yi An-seong (이안성) from the Deoksu Yi clan (덕수 이씨). They had issue (1 son, 1 daughter).)
  - Yun Baek-sang (윤백상; ?–1621) (Note: Half-brother of concubine birth.)
- Husband: Yi Bu (이부), Crown Prince Sunhoe (순회세자; 11 July 1557 – 16 October 1563) — No issue.
  - Father-in-law: King Myeongjong (명종대왕; 13 July 1534 – 12 August 1567)
  - Mother-in-law: Queen Insun (인순왕후), of the Cheongsong Shim clan (청송 심씨; 7 July 1532 – 22 February 1575)

== Ancestry ==
Ancestors of Crown Princess Gonghoe

Yun Mi-gyeon (윤미견)
Yun Jing (윤징)
Lady, of the Hayang Heo clan (하양 허씨)
Yun Sa-ik (윤사익)
Park Su-sin (박수신)
Lady, of the Juksan Park clan (죽산 박씨)
Lady, of the Gyeongju Yi clan (경주 이씨)
Yun Ok (윤옥)
Jeong Gi (정기)
Jeong Se-geol (정세걸)
Lady, of the Haengju Gi clan (행주 기씨)
Lady, of the Dongnae Jeong clan (동래 정씨)
Crown Princess Gonghoe
Yun Bong-jong (윤봉종)
Lady, of the Papyeong Yun clan (파평 윤씨)
Kim Jak (김작)
Kim Gye-ham (김계함)
Lady, of the Dongnae Jeong clan (동래 정씨)
Lady, of the (old) Andong Kim clan (구 안동 김씨)

== See also ==
- History of Korea
- List of Joseon royal consorts
- Styles and titles in Joseon
