= Consort Hwang =

Consort Hwang may refer to:

- Consort Hwang (Yongle) (1401–1421), concubine of the Yongle Emperor
- Crown Princess Yangje Hwang (fl. 1550s), consort of Crown Prince Sunhoe

== See also ==
- Consort Hwangbo (disambiguation)
