= Crown Prince Sunhoe =

Crown Prince of Joseon (1551–1563)

Crown Prince of Joseon
- Tenure: 19 September 1557 – 16 October 1563
- Investiture: Sajeongjeon, Gyeongbokgung
- Predecessor: Crown Prince Ho
- Successor: Crown Prince Hon
- Born: 11 July 1551; Gyotaejeon, Gyeongbokgung, Hanseong, Joseon
- Died: 16 October 1563 (aged 12); Jaseondang, Gyeongbokgung, Hanseong, Joseon
- Burial: Sunchangwon, Seooreung Cluster, Goyang, South Korea
- Spouse: Crown Princess Gonghoe (m. 1561)
Names
- Yi Bu (이부; 李暊)
Posthumous name
- Crown Prince Sunhoe (순회세자; 順懷世子)
- Clan: Jeonju Yi
- Dynasty: Yi
- Father: King Myeongjong
- Mother: Queen Insun
- Religion: Confucianism (Neo-Confucianism)

Korean name
- Hangul: 순회세자
- Hanja: 順懷世子
- RR: Sunhoe seja
- MR: Sunhoe seja

Courtesy name
- Hangul: 중명
- Hanja: 重明
- RR: Jungmyeong
- MR: Chungmyŏng

Childhood name
- Hangul: 곤령
- Hanja: 崐齡
- RR: Gonryeong
- MR: Kollyŏng

Crown Prince Sunhoe (Korean: 순회세자; Hanja: 順懷世子; 11 July 1551 – 16 October 1563), (Note: In the Korean calendar (lunisolar), he was born on the 28th day of the 5th lunar month and died on the 20th day of the 9th lunar month.) personal name Yi Bu, was the only son of King Myeongjong, the 13th monarch of Joseon.

== Biography ==
Yi Bu was born on 11 July 1551 to King Myeongjong and Queen Insun as their only son. During early childhood, he was known as Gon-ryeong (곤령), but eventually received his formal name.

In 1557, Yi Bu was invested as crown prince, and in 1561, he married the daughter of Yun Ok (윤옥). He was originally supposed to marry the daughter of Hwang Dae-im (황대임); the crown princess' investiture had already been completed when it was discovered that Lady Hwang suffered from a colic disease and she was demoted to a consort of the crown prince of the junior second rank (양제; yangje).

Yi Bu fell seriously ill and passed away in 1563, at the age of 12. He was buried within Sunchangwon (순창원), today part of the Seooreung Cluster in Goyang, Gyeonggi Province. His wife survived him by 28 years. Because her corpse disappeared upon the outbreak of the Imjin War (on 23 May 1592, one month after Lady Yun's death), only an empty coffin was buried alongside Yi Bu.

== Family ==
- Father: King Myeongjong (명종대왕; 13 July 1532 – 12 August 1567)
  - Grandfather: King Jungjong (중종대왕; 25 April 1488 – 9 December 1544)
  - Grandmother: Queen Munjeong (문정왕후), of the Papyeong Yun clan (파평 윤씨; 12 December 1501 – 15 May 1565)
- Mother: Queen Insun (인순왕후), of the Cheongsong Shim clan (청송 심씨; 17 July 1532 – 22 February 1575)
  - Grandfather: Shim Gang (심강), Internal Prince Cheongneung (청릉부원군; 1514–1567)
  - Grandmother: Internal Princess Consort Wansan (완산부부인), of the Jeonju Yi clan (전주 이씨; 1511–1559)

Consort(s)

- Crown Princess Gonghoe (공회빈), of the Musong Yun clan (무송 윤씨; 21 July 1553 – 14 April 1592)
- Yangje (양제), of the Changwon Hwang clan (창원 황씨)

== Ancestry ==
Ancestors of Crown Prince Sunhoe

King Deokjong (덕종대왕)
King Seongjong (성종대왕)
Queen Sohye, of the Cheongju Han clan (소혜왕후 청주 한씨)
King Jungjong (중종대왕)
Yun Ho, Internal Prince Yeongwon (영원부원군 윤호)
Queen Jeonghyeon, of the Papyeong Yun clan (정현왕후 파평 윤씨)
Internal Princess Consort Yeonan, of the Damyang Jeon clan (연안부부인 담양 전씨)
King Myeongjong (명종대왕)
Yun Uk (윤욱)
Yun Ji-im, Internal Prince Pasan (파산부원군 윤지임)
Lady, of the Yeonil Jeong clan (연일 정씨)
Queen Munjeong, of the Papyeong Yun clan (문정왕후 파평 윤씨)
Yi Deok-sung (이덕숭)
Internal Princess Consort Jeonseong, of the Jeonui Yi clan (전성부부인 전의 이씨)
Lady, of the Namyang Hong clan (남양 홍씨)
Crown Prince Sunhoe
Shim Sun-mun (심순문)
Shim Yeon-won (심연원)
Lady, of the Pyongsan Shin clan (평산 신씨)
Shim Gang, Internal Prince Cheongneung (청릉부원군 심강)
Kim Dang (김당)
Lady, of the Gyeongju Kim clan (경주 김씨)
Queen Insun, of the Cheongsong Shim clan (인순왕후 청송 심씨)
Yi Ja-gyeom, Prince Yeoyang (여양군 이자겸) (Note: Great-grandson of Grand Prince Hyoryeong.)
Yi Tae, Prince Jeonseong (전성군 이대)
Lady, of the Gwangsan Kim clan (광산 김씨)
Internal Princess Consort Wansan, of the Jeonju Yi clan (완산부부인 전주 이씨)
Jeong Jong-bo (정종보)
Lady, of the Dongnae Jeong clan (동래 정씨)

== See also ==
- History of Korea
- Styles and titles in Joseon
