= Hwang Shin-duk =

South Korean politician (1898–1983)

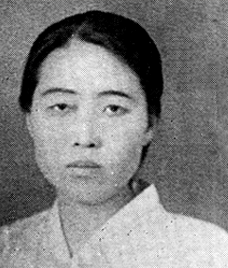
- Hwang in 1935

Member of the Interim Legislative Assembly
- In office 1946–1948

Personal details
- Born: 6 November 1898 Pyongyang, Korean Empire
- Died: 22 November 1983 (aged 85) Seoul, South Korea

Hwang Shin-duk (Korean: 황신덕; 6 November 1898 – 22 November 1983) was a South Korean journalist, activist, educator and politician. In 1946 she was one of the four women who were appointed to the Interim Legislative Assembly, becoming South Korea's first female legislators.

== Biography ==
Shin-duck was born in Pyongyang in 1898, a member of the Jaeahn Hwang clan. She attended Soongeui Girl's High School in Pyongyang until 1919 and then studied at Waseda University and the Japan Women's University in Japan, graduating in 1926. After returning to Korea, she worked as reporter for several newspapers, including The Dong-A Ilbo. She also participated in the anti-Japanese March First Movement and in 1927 became a member of the Singanhoe.

Following the end of World War II, the United States Army Military Government established an Interim Legislative Assembly with 90 members; 45 elected and 45 appointed by Military Governor John R. Hodge. Although women were unable to vote in the election, Hodge appointed four women, including Hwang, who was a representative of the Patriotic Women's Association. After the Assembly was dissolved in 1948, she was a government spokeswoman until 1950.

She was abducted by North Korea in 1950, but escaped. In 1952 she established the Women's Issues Research Association, and in 1956 founded the Family Law Consultation Centre. She later founded Chugye University for the Arts. She died in Seoul in 1983.
