= Jeju Cho clan =

- Country: Korea
- Current region: Jeju Province
- Founder: Cho Go do

Jeju Cho clan (Korean: 제주 초씨; Hanja: 濟州肖氏) is one of the Korean clans. Their Bon-gwan was in Jeju Province. According to research held in 1985, the number of the Jeju Cho clan was 30. Their founder was Cho Go do who came to Korea during the Goryeo and Yuan dynasty period and settled in Jeju Island. Their surname was originally Jo（Hanja: 趙）, but they changed it into Cho（Hanja: 肖）clan the 10th generation before. The document named Joseon Ssijok Tongbo (Korean: 조선씨족통보; Hanja: 朝鮮氏族統譜) recorded Jeju Cho clan as surrenderer of Yuan dynasty.

== See also ==
- Korean clan names of foreign origin
