= Cheongju Dongbang clan =

Korean clan from North Chungcheong Province

- Country: Korea
- Current region: Cheongju
- Founder: unknown

Cheongju Dongbang clan (Korean: 청주 동방씨; Hanja: 淸州 東方氏) was one of the Korean clans. Their Bon-gwan was in Cheongju, North Chungcheong Province. According to the research in 2000, the number of Cheongju Dongbang clan was 119. Dongbang clan was born in Jinan, China. Fuxi made surname East (Hanja: 東) because he was a citizen of zhèn (Hanja: 震), but it is not clear that how Cheongju Dongbang clan were established in Korea and their founder has been still unknown.

== See also ==
- Korean clan names of foreign origin
