= Haengju Eun clan =

Korean clan from Gyeonggi Province

- Country: Korea
- Current region: Goyang
- Founder: Eun Hong yeol
- Connected members: Eun Ji-won
- Website: http://www.hangjueun.org/

Haengju Eun clan (Korean: 행주 은씨; Hanja: 幸州 殷氏) is a Korean clan. Their Bon-gwan is in Goyang, Gyeonggi Province. As of 2000, clan has a membership of 12241. Their founder was Un Hong yeol, a scholar dispatched to Silla from the Tang dynasty in 850.

== See also ==
- Korean clan names of foreign origin
