= Consort Huang =

Consort Huang may refer to:

- Empress Dowager Huang (died after 936), concubine of Wang Shenzhi
- Consort Hwang (Yongle) (1401–1421), or Consort Huang, concubine of the Yongle Emperor
- Concubine Yi (Qianlong) (died 1736), concubine of the Qianlong Emperor
