= Angang No clan =

Korean clan from North Gyeongsang Province

- Country: Korea
- Current region: Gyeongju
- Founder: No Gon

Angang No clan (Korean: 안강 노씨; Hanja: 安康 盧氏) is a Korean clan. Their bongwan is in Gyeongju, North Gyeongsang Province. According to research conducted in 2000, the number of Angang No clan was 280. Their founder is No Gon. He was the 6th son of No Hae, who was dispatched to Silla when he was a Hanlin Academy in Tang dynasty. No Gon was chosen as Prince of Angang (Hanja: 安康伯) during the Goryeo period.

== See also ==
- Korean clan names of foreign origin
