= PCIC =

PCIC or pcic may refer to:

- The Pcič, a river in Eastern Europe
- Philippine Central Islands College, a college in San Jose, Occidental Mindoro, Philippines
- Philippine Crop Insurance Corporation, an agency attached to the Philippines Department of Finance
- Petrovietnam Construction Investment Consultant Joint Stock Company, a company controlled by Petrovietnam
- Parkdale Community Information Centre, a public service agency in Parkdale, Toronto, Canada
- Police-Citizen Interaction Committee, associated with the Rochester Police Department of Rochester, New York, United States
- President Candidate Image Checklist, developed by South Korean psychologist Sang-Min Whang
- Henley Professional Certificate in Coaching, of the Henley Business School, Africa, in Johannesburg, South Africa
