= Jinju Dongbang clan =

Korean clan from South Gyeongsang Province

- Country: Korea
- Current region: Jinju
- Founder: Dong Bang suk

Jinju Dongbang clan (Korean: 진주 동방씨; Hanja: 晋州 東方氏) was one of the Korean clans. Their Bon-gwan was in Jinju, South Gyeongsang Province. According to the research in 2000, the number of Jinju Dongbang clan was 98. Dongbang clan was born in Jinan, China. Fuxi made surname East (Hanja: 東) because he was a citizen of zhèn (Hanja: 震). Jinju Dongbang clan's founder was Dong Bang suk. He passed Imperial examination in 1792. It is not clear that how Jinju Dongbang clan were established in Korea.

== See also ==
- Korean clan names of foreign origin
