= Taewon Kim clan =

Korean clan from Shaanxi, China

Taewon Kim clan Taiyuan Kim clan
- Country: Korea
- Current region: Taiyuan
- Founder: Jin Xuezeng

The Taewon Kim clan (Korean: 태원 김씨; Hanja: 太原 金氏) is one of the Korean clans. Their Bon-gwan is in Taiyuan, Shanxi, China, also called Taewon in Korean. According to the census held by Korea in 2000, the number of households was 800, and the population of Taewon Kim clan was 2557. The apical ancestor of the clan was Jin Xuezeng (known in Korean as Kim Hakchŭng) who was appointed as an Inspector-Official (御史) in Fujian during Wanli Emperor's reign during the Ming dynasty. His son, who was named Kim P'yŏng (金坪), was naturalized in Korea.

== See also ==
- Korean clan names of foreign origin
