= Mi-yeon =

- Hangul: 미연
- RR: Miyeon
- MR: Miyŏn

Mi-yeon, also spelled Mi-youn or Mi-yeun, is a Korean given name.

== People ==
People with this name include:

- Serra Miyeun Hwang (born 1962), South Korean-born American composer
- Lee Mi-yeon (born 1971), South Korean actress
- Kim Mi-yeon (born 1979), South Korean curler
- Kan Mi-youn (born 1982), South Korean singer, member of girl group Baby Vox
- Serri (singer) (born Park Mi-yeon, 1990), South Korean singer, member of girl group Dal Shabet
- Miyeon (born Cho Mi-yeon, 1997), South Korean singer, member of girl group I-dle

== See also ==
- List of Korean given names
