= Pak Hongjang =

Korean military leader (1558–1598)

- Born: 1st day, 8th month of 1558; Yŏnghae, Joseon
- Died: 3rd day, 1st month of 1598
- Burial place: Yeongdeok, South Korea
- Military career
- Allegiance: Joseon
- Conflicts: Imjin War

Korean name
- Hangul: 박홍장
- Hanja: 朴弘長
- RR: Bak Hongjang
- MR: Pak Hongjang

Art name
- Hangul: 농아당
- Hanja: 聾啞堂
- RR: Nongadang
- MR: Nongadang

Courtesy name
- Hangul: 사임
- Hanja: 士任
- RR: Saim
- MR: Saim

Pak Hongjang (Korean: 박홍장; Hanja: 朴弘長; 1st day, 8th month of 1558 – 3rd day, 1st month of 1598) was a Korean general and diplomat of the mid-Joseon period. Born in 1558 in Yŏnghae, he passed the military service examination in 1580 and was subsequently appointed Subarea Commander of Ai. He later served as Royal Messenger and Executive Assistant to the Magistrate of Jeju.

During the Imjin War, Pak was appointed Auxiliary Defense Officer, tasked with supplying horses to the mainland and overseeing the training of warhorses. Following his father's death, he returned to his hometown. As Magistrate of Daegu, he established military farms and worked to restore agricultural production disrupted by the war.

In 1596, when Toyotomi Hideyoshi was formally invested, the Joseon court dispatched a diplomatic mission to Japan. Pak Hongjang was selected as Vice Envoy under the Chief Envoy Hwang Sin, with the added duty of assessing Japanese intentions. Although Hideyoshi refused to grant an audience to the Joseon envoys, Pak successfully carried out his intelligence mission, transmitting reports to King Seonjo through official channels.

Upon returning to Busan, Pak was appointed magistrate of Suncheon and later of Sangju, but recurring illness prevented him from taking office and he died in 1598.

== Early life and career ==
Pak Hongjang was born on the 1st day, 8th month in 1558 at Wŏn'gori (원고리; 元皐里) or Wŏn'guri (원구리; 元丘里) in Yŏnghae, Joseon. He belonged to the Muan Pak clan; his father, Pak Seryŏm (박세렴; 朴世廉), served as Magistrate of Yŏngil, and held other official posts, while his mother, Lady Nam of the Yeongyang Nam clan, daughter of Nam Sijun (남시준; 南時俊). His elder brother, Pak Ŭijang, served as Magistrate of Gyeongju during the Imjin War.

Pak Hongjang, influenced by his father and elder brother who had both passed the military examination, likewise pursued a military career. After serving as a Palace Cavalry Guard (겸사복; 兼司僕), he passed the special military examination with third-tier honors (병과; 丙科) in 1580. Not long after the outbreak of Nit'anggae's Rebellion, in the 5th month of 1583, he was appointed Subarea Commander (만호; 萬戶) of Ai (아이; 阿耳) in Pyoktong, Pyongan Province. He subsequently served as an officer under Yi Chŏn, Provincial Military Commander of Pyongan. and in 1586 became an officer under Yi Il, Provincial Military Commander of North Hamgyong. At this time, Yi Il, seeking to devise defensive measures against the Jurchens, expanded the military strategy of Chesŭng Pangnyak into a version adapted for the northern frontier and urged the court to adopt it. Pak Hongjang was entrusted with transporting this work to Hanyang.

Having spent years on the northern frontier, he was appointed Royal Messenger (선전관; 宣傳官) in 1588, and in 1589 was transferred to the post of Executive Assistant to Magistrate (판관; 判官) of Jeju.

== Imjin War ==
=== Activities in Jeju ===
In the 3rd month of 1592, Pak Hongjang was relieved of his position as Executive Assistant to the Magistrate of Jeju. Yet, as he prepared to depart for the mainland in the following month, the outbreak of the Imjin War compelled him to remain on the island, where he was appointed Auxiliary Defense Officer (조방장; 助防將). In this capacity, Pak assisted the Magistrate of Jeju in organizing defensive measures against the threat of Japanese incursions. However, since Jeju was never directly subjected to Japanese attack, the island's primary strategic function during the war lay in the delivery of tribute horses to the mainland. Pak Hongjang aided Yi Kyŏngnok, Magistrate of Jeju, in mobilizing local troops and overseeing preparations for the horse tribute. He further supervised the training of horses for combat deployment, thereby maintaining the island's military readiness despite the absence of enemy engagement.

In the 12th month of 1593, Pak Hongjang's father died; however, due to the exigencies of war, he was unable to be present at his father's final moments, and he himself soon fell ill. Following a petition submitted by his mother, he was granted release from office, and in the 7th month of 1594 departed Jeju. His voyage to the mainland was perilous, the vessel nearly capsizing en route, and upon landing in the Jeolla region he again fell gravely ill. Consequently, he remained in Gangjin to recuperate. He later relocated his residence to Haenam, but was nevertheless appointed Magistrate of Yeongam.

=== Activities in Daegu ===
In the latter part of the year 1594, Pak Hongjang was appointed Magistrate of Daegu. In this capacity, his primary responsibilities were to reassure the local populace and to secure military provisions and other supplies for the Ming forces. Daegu had earlier fallen to the Japanese, when the 1st Division under Konishi Yukinaga seized the city on the 21st day, 4th month of 1592, maintaining control until their withdrawal on the 15th day, 5th month of 1593. Following the Japanese retreat, Ming troops were stationed in Daegu. In the 7th month of 1594, however, General Liu Ting, who had been encamped near the city, withdrew, though the provision of supplies to Ming forces continued.

In response, Pak Hongjang initiated the reclamation of wasteland for the establishment of military farms. Discussions concerning such farms in Daegu had begun in the 12th month of 1593, and implementation was carried out from early 1594 under the direction of Han Hyosun, Governor of Gyeongsang Province, yielding tens of thousands of sŏk of grain, to which Pak contributed significantly. He procured seed grain from neighboring districts and oversaw the agricultural work, ultimately securing a harvest of over 3,000 sŏk. In recognition of these achievements, he was granted honorary appointments as Chief Director (정; 正) of the Directorate of Military Procurement (군자감; 軍資監).

=== Joseon mission in 1596 to Hideyoshi ===
Following the Ming defeat at the Battle of Byeokjegwan in the 2nd month of 1593, the Ming court initiated peace negotiations with Japan. In the 9th month of 1594, under Ming pressure, Joseon court submitted a memorial requesting that Japan be granted investiture and allowed to dispatch tribute, whereupon the Ming resolved to send an investiture envoy. In the 12th month of 1595, Shen Weijing requested that Joseon designate an official to accompany the Ming envoy to Japan, a request soon echoed by Konishi Yukinaga and other Japanese commanders, who urged the dispatch of a communication envoy. Although the Joseon court opposed such negotiations, it could not refuse the Ming, who had provided military reinforcements.

In the 6th month in 1596, King Seonjo ordered that a decision on the envoy be reached without delay. Following deliberations, Pak Hongjang was appointed Vice Envoy (부사; 副使) to accompany the Chief Envoy (정사; 正使) Hwang Sin, and his rank was elevated to Chief Director (정; 正) of the Bureau of Court Music (장악원; 掌樂院) and subsequently to Senior Military Protector (상호군; 上護軍) of the Ŭihŭng Guards (의흥위; 義興衛). Because the mission was to proceed during wartime, the court selected the military official Pak Hongjang as Vice Envoy with the dual purpose of observing conditions within the Japanese encampments and ascertaining whether Toyotomi Hideyoshi intended to undertake a renewed invasion.

Pak Hongjang proceeded from Daegu to Gyeongju, where he received the state letter from interpreters dispatched from Hanyang, and on the 3rd day of the 8th month joined Hwang Sin in Busan. Under the guidance of Yanagawa Shigenobu, the envoys boarded a Japanese vessel and departed from Busan on the following day. The mission reached Tsushima on the 10th day of the 8th month, Ikki on the 25th, Nagoya on the 29th, and finally arrived at Sakai Port in Ōsaka on the 18th day of the leap 8th month, where they encountered the Ming investiture envoys, including Shen Weijing, who had preceded them. The investiture of Toyotomi Hideyoshi was held on the 3rd day of the 9th month; however, Toyotomi declined to meet the Joseon envoys, contending that their late arrival and the absence of either a royal prince or a high-ranking minister—replaced instead by lesser officials—rendered the mission unacceptable. With peace talks between Ming and Japan collapsing soon thereafter, the Joseon embassy, unable to deliver the state letter, embarked on its return journey on the 9th day of the 9th month.

Nevertheless, Pak Hongjang fulfilled his charge of intelligence-gathering regarding conditions in Japan. From his arrival at Tsushima, he dispatched reports to King Seonjo through the Governor of Gyeongsang Province, while also transmitting information clandestinely—obtained from Ming envoys, Japanese sources, interpreters, and Joseon captives—through the military officers Cho Tŏksu (조덕수; 趙德秀) and Pak Chŏngho (박정호; 朴挺豪). These communications enabled Seonjo to learn of the collapse of peace negotiations and to alert the Ming court to the likelihood of a renewed Japanese invasion. Pak returned to Busan on the 23rd day of the 11th month and, submitted reports which warned that Japan appeared poised to undertake another offensive on the 1st–2nd months of the following year.

=== Final years ===
Following his return from Japan, Pak Hongjang was appointed Magistrate of Suncheon; yet the residents of Daegu submitted a petition for his reinstatement, leading to his continuance as Magistrate of that prefecture. His health, however, deteriorated, preventing him from assuming office, and he instead withdrew to his native home. In 1597 he received appointment as Magistrate of Sangju, but illness again precluded his service. On the 3rd day, 1st month of 1598, he died at the age of 41.
