= Yeonil No clan =

- Country: Korea
- Current region: Pohang
- Founder: No Gyeong ryeong

Yeonil No clan (Korean: 연일 노씨; Hanja: 延日 盧氏) was one of the Korean clans. Their Bon-gwan was in Pohang, North Gyeongsang Province. Their founder was No Gyeong ryeong who was dispatched to Silla when he was a Hanlin Academy in Tang dynasty. He was a son of No Jeung (Hanja: 盧增). No Jeung (Hanja: 盧增) was son of No Hae). No Jeung (Hanja: 盧增) was appointed as Prince of Yeonil (Hanja: 延日伯) because he made an achievement during Silla period. Then, No Gyeong ryeong who was a No Jeung (Hanja: 盧增)’s son began Yeonil No clan.

== See also ==
- Korean clan names of foreign origin
