= Jeonju Chu clan =

Korean clan from North Jeolla Province

- Country: Korea
- Current region: Jeonju
- Founder: Chu Yeop

Jeonju Chu clan (Korean: 전주 추씨; Hanja: 全州 秋氏) is one of the Korean clans. Their Bon-gwan was in Jeonju, North Jeolla Province. According to the research held in 2015, the number of Jeonju Chu clan was 49017. Their founder was Chu Yeop who worked as Munha sijung (門下侍中) in Song dynasty during Emperor Gaozong of Song’s reign in 1141. Chu Su gyeong joined the Japanese invasions of Korea war with his son, Chu Ro and Chu Jeok, because he was ordered by Wanli Emperor. Chu Yeop, Chu Ro, and Chu Jeok fought with the 5000 soldiers and went over Yalu River. After that, Chu Su gyeong’s third son Chu Guk, fourth son Chu Ji, and fifth son Chu Ran also joined the war. Chu Su gyeong was a Chu Yeop’s descendant and Chu Su gyeong was in his teens. They made some achievements during Japanese invasions of Korea, but they settled in Jeonju without coming back their home. All of their descendants were the member of Jeonju Chu clan.

== See also ==
- Korean clan names of foreign origin
