= Gwangju Mo clan =

Korean clan from Guangdong, China

- Country: Korea
- Current region: Guangzhou
- Founder: unknown
- Connected members: Moh Youn-sook

The Gwangju Mo clan (Korean: 광주 모씨; Hanja: 廣州 毛氏) is a Korean clan, with a bon-gwan located in Guangzhou, Guangdong, China (known as Gwangju in Korean). According to the census in 2015, the population of the Gwangju Mo clan was 92. Mo clan was born in Western Xia, China. King Wen in Zhou dynasty appointed his son as Mo clan, but it is not clear that how their clan was established in Korea, and the Gwangju Mo clan's founder has been still unknown.

== See also ==
- Korean clan names of foreign origin
