= Cheongju Yang clan =

Korean clan from North Chungcheong Province

- Country: Korea
- Current region: Cheongju
- Founder: Yang Gi
- Connected members: Yang Hee-kyung; Yang Byung-yeol; Imperial Consort Boknyeong Gwi-in; Yang Seung-ho; Yang Ji-won (singer); Yang Jin-sung

Cheongju Yang clan (Korean: 청주 양씨; Hanja: 淸州 楊氏) is one of the Korean clans. Their Bon-gwan is in Cheongju, North Chungcheong Province. According to the research held in 2015, the number of Cheongju Yang clan's member was 38161. Their founder was Yang Gi who was a 43 th descendant of Yang Zhen in Han dynasty. When Yang Gi was a Jinzi Guanglu Daifu (Hanja: 金紫光祿大夫), Princess Noguk had a marriage to an ordinary person planned by Gongmin of Goryeo. Because of this, Yang Gi entered Goryeo as a fatherly master of the Queen. Yang Gi became Gongsin (Hanja: 功臣) because he made a lot of contribution to diplomacy in Goryeo and Yuan dynasty. Yang Gi's descendant founded Cheongju Yang clan and made Cheongju, Cheongju Yang clan's Bon-gwan.

== See also ==
- Korean clan names of foreign origin
