= Pyeonghae Hwang clan =

Korean clan from North Gyeongsang Province

- Country: Korea
- Current region: Uljin County
- Founder: Hwang On in
- Connected members: Hwang Jung-eum; SinB

Pyeonghae Hwang clan (Korean: 평해 황씨; Hanja: 平海 黃氏) is one of the Korean clans. Their Bon-gwan is in Pyeonghae-eup, Uljin County, North Gyeongsang Province. According to the research from 2015, the number of Pyeonghae Hwang clan members was 168,374. Hwang Rak (Hanja: 黄洛), a minister in Han dynasty, began the Hwang clan in Korea. When Hwang Rak (Hanja: 黄洛) was dispatched as an envoy in 28 B.C. during Emperor Guangwu of Han's reign, he was cast ashore on his way to Vietnam and was naturalized in Silla. As a result, Hwang On in, a descendant of Hwang Rak (Hanja: 黄洛), became a Pyeonghae Hwang clan's founder.

== Notable clan members ==
- Hwang Jung-eum
- Hwang Eun-bi
- Hwang Kyung-seon
- Hwang Pyong-so
- Sang-Min Whang
- Hwang Sun-hong
- Hwang Young-cho

== See also ==
- Korean clan names of foreign origin
