= Dalseong Park =

Park in Daegu, South Korea

Coordinates: 35.8739854°N 128.5778689°E

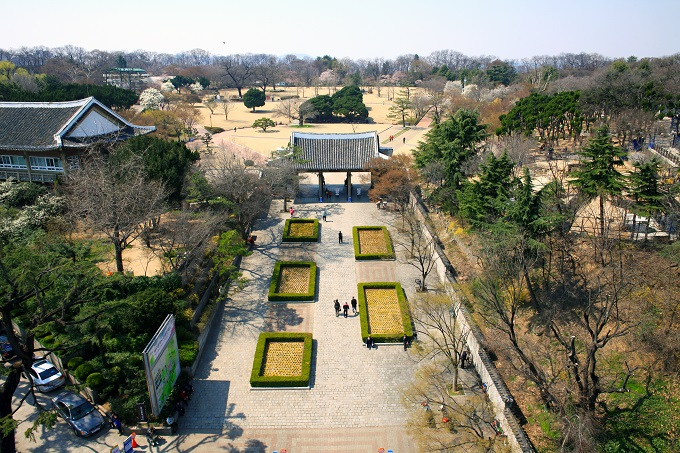
- Overview of part of the park (2016)
- Interactive map of Dalseong Park
- Location: Jung District, Daegu, South Korea
- Created: 1905
- Designation

Historic Sites of South Korea
- Official name: Dalseong Fortress, Daegu
- Designated: 1963-01-21
- Reference no.: 62

Korean name
- Hangul: 달성공원
- Hanja: 達城公園
- RR: Dalseong gongwon
- MR: Talsŏng kongwŏn

Dalseong Park (Korean: 달성공원) is a park located in Jung District, Daegu, South Korea. The park includes Gwanpungnu Pavilion, a local history hall, a zoo, and some monuments.

On January 21, 1963, it was designated Historic Site of South Korea No. 62.

== History ==
The park was originally a fortress called Dalseong. It was built on a low hill. The site of the fortress had an Iron Age settlement on it. The fortress was constructed during the Three Kingdoms of Korea period. It is believed that it is mentioned in the Samguk sagi as "Dalbeolseong" (달벌성; 達伐城; Talbŏlsŏng); that fortress was constructed in 261 (Korean calendar). It was occupied until the early Joseon period. It has a circumference of 1,300 m (4,300 ft). It became a public park in 1905. The fortress is considered the ancestral home of the Dalseong Seo clan.

During the Sino-Japanese war in 1894–1895 the land was used as a Japanese military base. It was renovated to its current form in 1965.

== Dalseong Park Zoo ==
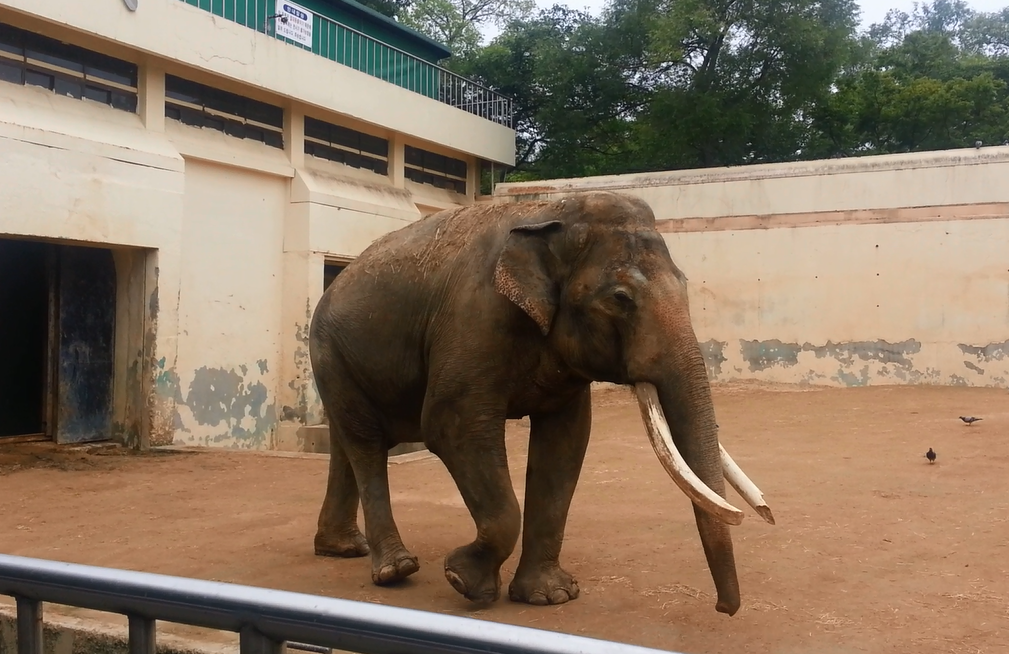
Bokdong the bull asian elephant with long tusks, was dead in 2023-08-04

Animals in the zoo's collection include an Asian elephant, Indian peafowls, Hybrid tigers, sika deers, a plains zebra, pheasants, Cinereous vultures, Eurasian eagle owls, monkeys, crested porcupines, a brown bear and a chimpanzee.
