= Dalseong Seo clan =

Korean clan based in Daegu, South Korea

Family Seal of the Dalseong Seo clan

The Dalseong Seo clan (Korean: 달성 서씨; Hanja: 達城徐氏) is a Korean noble/aristocratic house of the Seo (Korean: 서; Hanja: 徐) family originated from Silla (As a cadet branch founded in the late 13th century from Icheon Seo Clan). Its ancestral seat is Dalseong (Korean: 달성; Hanja: 達城), a historic name for the area of present day Daegu. The Dalseong Seo clan is historically intertwined with the Daegu Seo clan (Korean: 대구서씨; Hanja: 大丘徐氏), which shares the same ancestral region but records a different progenitor.

== Origins ==
The house descends from Seo Jin (徐晉, fl. late 13th–early 14th century), a civil official of the last century of Goryeo whose career culminated in ministerial rank over the census and taxation administration. His service earned him the lordship of Dalseong (Korean: 달성군; Hanja: 達城君, "Lord Dalseong") together with landholdings in the Daegu region, and the family's establishment there dates from this grant. His tomb is located in Munyang-ri, Dasa-eup, Dalseong County, Daegu.

The title Dalseong-gun was held across three successive generations: Seo Jin, his son Seo Gi-jun (Korean: 서기준; Hanja: 徐奇俊), and his grandson Seo Yeong (Korean: 서영; Hanja: 徐穎) were each enfeoffed as Lord of Dalseong and the descendants accordingly adopted Dalseong as their bon-gwan. Its influence reached its height during the Joseon dynasty through the conferral of titles and marriage alliances with the royal family.

== Relationship with the Daegu Seo clan ==
The Dalseong Seo clan and the Daegu Seo clan both take the Daegu region as their ancestral seat, Dalseong being an old name for Daegu, but the two clans record different progenitors: Seo Jin for the Dalseong Seo, and Seo Han (Korean: 서한; Hanja: 徐閈), a Goryeo official of the Armory (gungi soyun, Korean: 군기소윤; Hanja: 軍器少尹), for the Daegu Seo. The two lineages compiled a joint genealogy in 1702 before keeping separate registers from the 18th century, and members of each clan sometimes appear in historical records under the other's bon-gwan; for this reason the honors and prominent figures of the two houses are frequently treated together.

== History ==
=== Goryeo period ===
Following the three generations of Dalseong-gun lordships, the fourth-generation descendant Seo Gyun-hyeong (Korean: 서균형; Hanja: 徐鈞衡, 1340–1391) served the late Goryeo court as Grand Academician of the Yemun'gwan (Korean: 예문관대재학; Hanja: 藝文館大提學) and as governor of Yanggwang Province. He is the principal figure enshrined at Okgye Seowon, a Confucian academy established in 1798 in Gachang-myeon, Dalseong County.

=== Joseon period ===
Under Sejong the Great, the fifth-generation descendant Seo Chim (서침 徐忱) ceded the hereditary family seat of the Dalseong earthen fortress when the state required it for defense and is remembered in Daegu tradition for seeking relief for the common people of the district rather than reward for himself; he is enshrined at Guam Seowon (Korean: 구암서원; Hanja:龜巖書院), and a tree in Dalseong Park bears his name.

Figures associated with the combined Dalseong–Daegu Seo house rose to the highest offices of the Joseon state. Seo Geo-jeong (Korean: 서거정; Hanja: 徐居正, 1420–1488) served as Grand Academician (大提學) and second-rank State Councillor, and was enfeoffed as Dalseong-gun, equivalent to lordship. Queen Jeongseong (Korean: 정성황후; Hanja: 貞聖王后, 1692–1757), primary consort of King Yeongjo, was a daughter of the house; her father Seo Jong-je (Korean: 서종제; Hanja: 徐宗悌) received the title Dalseong Buwongun (Korean: 달성부원군; Hanja: 達城府院君), internal prince of the court title, accorded to fathers of queens consort, equivalent to dukedom. The royal son-in-law Seo Gyeong-ju (Korean: 서경주; Hanja: 徐景霌, 1579–1643), husband of a daughter of King Seonjo, held the consort title Dalseong-wi (Korean: 달성위; Hanja: 達城尉), equivalent to Earldom. Later members of the house served as Chief State Councillors, ministers of the Six Boards, Grand Academicians, and military commanders during the 17th–19th centuries.

In 1656, the Cheonan county magistrate Seo Byeon (Korean: 서변; Hanja: 徐忭, 1605–1656) died after reporting an alleged conspiracy to the throne; his descendants took refuge in Gachang-myeon in the Dalseong area, where a clan village of the lineage remains.

=== Modern period ===
Modern figures of the clan include the independence activist Seo Jae-pil (Korean: 서재필; Hanja: 徐載弼, "Philip Jaisohn", 1864–1951), a descendant of Dalseong Buwongun Seo Jong-je, and the poet Seo Yeongsuhap (Korean: 서영수합; Hanja: 徐令壽閤, 1753–1823).

== Branches ==
The clan is divided into nine branch lineages (pa, 派), including the Hyeongamgong-pa (縣監公派), Hakyugong-pa (學諭公派), Panseogong-pa (判書公派), Gamchalgong-pa (監察公派), Jinsagong-pa (進士公派), Saengwongong-pa (生員公派), Champangong-pa (參判公派), and Jongsaranggong-pa (從仕郞公派).

Clan-related historic sites include Guam Seowon in Daegu, Okgye Seowon in Dalseong County, and Bunyang Seowon in Muju County.

== See also ==
- Daegu Seo clan
- Icheon Seo clan
- Seo (Korean surname)
- Bon-gwan
- Korean clans
