= Hoideok Hwang clan =

Korean clan from Daejeon

- Country: Korea
- Current region: Daedeok District
- Founder: Hwang Yun bo

Hoideok Hwang clan (Korean: 회덕 황씨; Hanja: 懷德 黃氏) is a Korean clan. Their Bon-gwan is in Daedeok District, Daejeon. According to the research held in 2015, the number of Hoideok Hwang clan’s member was 8385. Hwang Rak (Hanja: 黄洛), a minister in Han dynasty, began the Hwang clan in Korea. Hwang Rak (Hanja: 黄洛) had an accident on the sea on his way to Vietnam as an envoy in 28 CE during Emperor Guangwu of Han's reign. Hwang Yun bo, a descendant of (Hanja: 黄洛), was the founder of Hoideok Hwang clan. He worked as a minister of justice (刑部尚書, Xingbu Shangshu) and a founding Minister (Korean: 좌명공신; Hanja: 佐命功臣). Then, he became Prince of Daedeok.

== See also ==
- Korean clan names of foreign origin
