= Hangju Hwang clan =

Korean clan from Zhejiang, China

- Country: Korea
- Current region: Hangzhou
- Founder: Hwang Gong

Hangju Hwang clan (Korean: 항주 황씨; Hanja: 杭州 黃氏) is a Korean clan. Their Bon-gwan is in Hangzhou, Zhejiang, China. As of 2000, there was 402 members of this clan. Their founder was Hwang Gong, who was from Hangzhou, living during the Ming dynasty, and worked as Commander (Hanja: 指揮使). He was naturalized in Joseon, ruled by Crown Prince Sohyeon in 1645. Hwang Gong's descendants settled in Gapyeong County, Gyeonggi Province and made Hangzhou their Bon-gwan, founding the Hangju Hwang clan.

== See also ==
- Korean clan names of foreign origin
