= Yeoyang Jin clan =

Korean clan from South Chungcheong Province

- Country: Korea
- Current region: Hongseong County
- Founder: Jin Chong hu
- Connected members: Jin Chae-seon; Chin Young; Chin Dae-je
- Website: yeoyangjin.org

Yeoyang Jin clan (Korean: 여양 진씨; Hanja: 驪陽 陳氏) is one of the Korean clans. Their Bon-gwan is in Hongseong County, South Chungcheong Province. According to the research held in 2015, the number of Yeoyang Jin clan’s member was 110,403. Their founder was Jin Chong hu who worked as Hanlin Academy in Song dynasty and a Jin Jun’s grandchild. Jin Jun was naturalized in Goryeo to avoid an invasion from Jin dynasty (1115–1234). Jin Chong hu made some achievements when he suppressed rebellion of Yi Cha-gyŏm who was Injong of Goryeo’s maternal relative. As a result, Jin Chong hu got lands in Yeoyang and was appointed as Prince of Yeoyang. Yeoyang is now called Hongseong. Then, Jin Chong hu founded Yeoyang Jin clan.

== See also ==
- Korean clan names of foreign origin
