= Haman Jo clan =

Korean clan from South Gyeongsang Province

- Country: Korea
- Current region: Haman County
- Founder: Jo Jeong
- Connected members: Cho Yoon-sun; Cho Hyun-oh; Cho Kwang-rae; Jo Jung-rae; Jo So-ang
- Website: hamanjo.co.kr

The Haman Jo clan (Korean: 함안 조씨; Hanja: 咸安 趙氏) is one of many Korean clans. Their Bon-gwan is in Haman County, South Gyeongsang Province. According to research held in 2015, the population of the Haman Jo clan was 282,890. Their founder was Jo Jeong, who was a chief vassal in Goryeo. He was the descendant of a royal family in the ancient Chinese state of Zhao. He went to Korea, and contributed to founding Goryeo. He was awarded Gongsin (Hanja: 功臣) and the Four-star rank.

== See also ==
- Korean clan names of foreign origin
