= Chugye University for the Arts =

Fine arts school in Seoul, South Korea

- Established: 1974
- President: Im Sang-hyeok (임상혁)
- Location: Seoul, South Korea; 37.56242°N 126.95339°E
- Website: www.chugye.ac.kr

- Chugye University for the Arts
- Hangul: 추계예술대학교
- Hanja: 秋溪藝術大學校
- RR: Chugye yesul daehakgyo
- MR: Ch'ugye yesul taehakkyo

Chugye University for the Arts (Korean: 추계예술대학교) is a South Korean institute of higher education in the music and fine arts. The campus is in Seodaemun District in central Seoul, the country's capital.

== Academics ==
Undergraduate courses are offered toward Bachelor of Arts, Bachelor of Music, and Bachelor of Fine Arts degrees. They are provided by colleges of Music, Fine Arts, and Literature.

Graduate offerings at the Master's level are provided through the Graduate School of Arts Management.

== History ==
In 1973, ChuGye University for the Arts was established by the ChuGye School Foundation of Hwang Shin-duk.

In November 1973, the ChuGye School Foundation was approved by the Ministry of Education for founding a junior college of arts. In March 1974, the college first opened its doors with an enrollment of 200 students over Korean Music, Voice, Instruments, Korean Painting and Western Painting departments. Hyung Bin Yim was inaugurated as its first president.

Extending the schooling period from two to four years in January 1976, the college began to offer more variety of education in the arts. The Department of Piano (1980) and the Department of Creative Writing (1982) were established.

The college has become an accredited university by the government to confer the degrees of B.A., B.M., and B.F.A. under its new name “ChuGye University for the Arts” since 1997. Students are required to obtain 140 credits or more and to pass 'academic evaluation for graduation' to get undergraduate degrees.

Chugye University for the Arts has established a Graduate School of Arts Management. The Graduate School of Art Management, ChuGye University for the Arts provides master's degree programs on arts management as well as on planning and research of the culture.

== Notable alumni ==
- Heo Yeon, poet and journalist
- Jun Kwang-ryul, actor
- Moon Chae-won, actress
- Park Hyun-bin, singer

== See also ==
- List of colleges and universities in South Korea
- Education in South Korea
