= Musong Yun clan =

Korean clan from North Hamgyong Province

- Country: Korea
- Current region: Gochang County
- Founder: Yun Yang bi
- Connected members: Crown Princess Gonghoe; Yun Taek; Yun So-jong; Yun-hoi; Yun Ja-un; Yun Se-ju; Yun Yeong-o; Yun Seok-heon; Yun Yeong-seon

The Musong Yun clan (Korean: 무송 윤씨; Hanja: 茂松 尹氏) is a Korean clan belonging to the greater Yoon surname. The clan's historic Bon-gwan was in Kyonghung County, North Hamgyong Province. According to research conducted in 2015, the number of Musong Yun clan members was 14,572. Their founder was Yun Yang bi, a descendant of Yun Gyeong (Hanja: 尹鏡). He fled from China to Gochang County, North Jeolla Province in order to avoid conflicts happened in Later Tang.

== See also ==
- Korean clan names of foreign origin
