= Deoksan Hwang clan =

Korean clan from South Chungcheong Province

- Country: Korea
- Current region: Yesan County
- Founder: Hwang Eon pil

Deoksan Hwang clan (Korean: 덕산 황씨; Hanja: 德山 黃氏) is one of the Korean clans. Their Bon-gwan is in Yesan County, South Chungcheong Province. According to the research held in 2015, the number of Deoksan Hwang clan’s member was 3857. Hwang Rak (Hanja: 黄洛), a minister in Han dynasty, began Hwang clan in Korea. Hwang Rak (Hanja: 黄洛) had an accident on the sea on his way to Vietnam as an envoy in 28 during Emperor Guangwu of Han’s reign. Then, Hwang Rak (Hanja: 黄洛) drifted ashore in Silla and was naturalized there. Hwang Eon pil, a descendant of (Hanja: 黄洛), founded Deoksan Hwang clan.

== See also ==
- Korean clan names of foreign origin
