= Pyeongtaek Im clan =

Korean clan from Gyeonggi Province

- Country: Korea
- Current region: Pyeongtaek
- Founder: Im Pal geup
- Website: ptl.or.kr

Pyeongtaek Im clan (Korean: 평택 임씨; Hanja: 平澤 林氏) is one of the Korean clans. Their Bon-gwan is in Pyeongtaek, Gyeonggi Province. According to the research held in 2015, the number of Pyeongtaek Im clan's member was 225872. Their founder was Im Pal geup who was a Hanlin Academy in Tang dynasty. He was naturalized in Silla as one of the Eight Scholars (Hanja: 八學士) in Tang dynasty.

== Notable people ==
- Im Nayeon
- Lim Na-young
- Nana (entertainer)
- Im Se-mi
- Im Soo-jung

== See also ==
- Korean clan names of foreign origin
