= Gangneung Choe clan =

The Gangneung Choi clan (Kangnung Choi, Kangnung Choe) (강릉최씨 is a Korean clan consisting of 510,000 people. As of 2001 it was the 51st-largest in South Korea. As custom dictates, the oldest son always keeps the record of the family history.

== History ==
During the Joseon Dynasty, the Gangneung Choi clan had many nobles.
