= Haeju Yun clan =

Korean clan from Hwanghae Province

- Country: Korea
- Current region: Haeju
- Founder: Yun Jung bu

Haeju Yun clan (Korean: 해주 윤씨; Hanja: 海州 尹氏) was one of the Korean clans. Their Bon-gwan was in Haeju, Hwanghae Province. According to the research in 2000, the number of Haeju Yun clan was 899. Their founder was Yun Jung bu. He was a son of Yun Sin (Hanja: 尹信) who served as an imperial magistrate (Hanja: 府尹, fuyin) in Ming dynasty. He was a younger brother of Yun Bong (Hanja: 尹鳳) who was a eunuch in Ming dynasty. He was dispatched to Joseon as an assistant of Yun Bong (Hanja: 尹鳳). Then, he was granted some government posts such as Minister of War (Hanja: 同知樞密院事).

== See also ==
- Korean clan names of foreign origin
