= Sangju Hwang clan =

Korean clan from North Gyeongsang Province

- Country: Korea
- Current region: Sangju
- Founder: Hwang Seok ju

Sangju Hwang clan (Korean: 상주 황씨; Hanja: 尙州 黃氏) is one of the Korean clans. Their Bon-gwan is in Sangju, North Gyeongsang Province. According to the research held in 2015, the number of Sangju Hwang clan’s member was 7685. Hwang Rak (Hanja: 黄洛), a minister in Han dynasty, began Hwang clan in Korea. Hwang Rak (Hanja: 黄洛) had a shipwreck on his way to Vietnam when he was dispatched as an envoy in the 28 th year of Emperor Guangwu of Han period. Sangju Hwang clan’s founder was Hwang Seok ju who was a descendant of Hwang Rak (Hanja: 黄洛) and worked as a government post in great general (Hanja: 柱国) in Goryeo period. Hwang Eul gu (Hanja: 黄乙具), 4 th children of Hwang Seok ju, was settled in Sangju and officially founded Sangju Hwang clan.

== See also ==
- Korean clan names of foreign origin
