= Yangje Hwang =

Korean royal consort (fl. 16th century)

- Royal Consort of the Junior Second Rank
- Born: before 1555; Joseon
- Died: after 1563; Joseon
- Consort of: Crown Prince Sunhoe
- Clan: Changwon Hwang (by birth); Jeonju Yi (by marriage)
- Dynasty: Yi
- Father: Hwang Dae-im

Korean name
- Hangul: 양제 황씨
- Hanja: 良娣 黃氏
- RR: Yangje Hwangssi
- MR: Yangje Hwangssi

Yangje Hwang (Korean: 양제 황씨; Hanja: 良娣 黃氏; birth and death dates unknown), of the Changwon Hwang clan, was a consort of Crown Prince Sunhoe, the only son of King Myeongjong.

She was initially chosen as crown princess at the behest of Yun Won-hyeong, but was soon demoted to a consort of the crown prince of the junior second rank (양제; yangje) (Note: lit. ''Lady of Excellence'') after it was discovered that she suffered from a chronic disease. It remains unknown when she died and where her tomb is located.

== See also ==
- Styles and titles in Joseon
