= Yeongyang Nam clan =

Korean clan from North Gyeongsang Province

- Country: Korea
- Current region: Yeongyang County
- Founder: Gim Chung

Yeongyang Nam clan (Korean: 영양 남씨; Hanja: 英陽 南氏) is one of the Korean clans. Their Bon-gwan is in Yeongyang County, North Gyeongsang Province. According to the research held in 2000, the number of Yeongyang Nam clan was 69155. Their founder was Gim Chung who was naturalized in Silla. Before he was naturalized, he was dispatched to Japan as an envoy. However, on his way back to Korea, he had a shipwreck because of the typhoon. He was granted his new surname Nam by the king of China because he was from Runan, China.

== See also ==
- Korean clan names of foreign origin
