= Plenary adoption =

Plenary adoption (French: adoption plénière Japanese: 特別養子縁組 Korean: 친양자 입양) is an adoption which terminates the relationship between birth parent and child.

== See also ==
- French nationality law
- History of French nationality
