= Hwang Jun-seok =

South Korean engineer

- Education: Yonsei University (B.S.); University of Colorado (M.S.); University of Pittsburgh (Ph.D.)

Korean name
- Hangul: 황준석
- RR: Hwang Junseok
- MR: Hwang Chunsŏk
- Website: Faculty Page

Hwang Jun-seok is a South Korean engineer. He currently serves as Director and Dean of the Technology Management, Economics and Policy Program (TEMEP) and of the International Information Technology Policy Scholarship Program (ITPP) at the Seoul National University and Associate Professor at the Seoul National University.

== Education ==
Hwang received his B.S. degree from Yonsei University, Seoul specializing in Mathematics, his M.S. degree in Telecommunications from the University of Colorado, and his Ph.D. in Information Science and Telecommunications from the University of Pittsburgh, Pennsylvania in the United States with the Dissertation entitled "A Market-Based Model for the Bandwidth Management of IntServ-DiffServ QoS Interconnection".

== Career ==
He is now leading the research groups of IT Innovation Study, Telecommunications Industry & Broadband Convergence in TEMEP in SNU. Simultaneously, he has been supervising research and theses of Master's and Doctoral candidates in SNU. He is actively taking part in the local and international research and academic organizations. Prof. Hwang is also teaching and supervising the International students from as much as 40 countries in International Information Technology Policy Scholarship Program (ITPP) in Seoul National University, South Korea.

In September, 2008, Prof. Hwang co-chaired and organized the Seoul Global Conference on ICT and Convergence held in Seoul.

== Awards ==
1. Winner of the Best Paper Award with the paper entitled in the Economics of Interconnection among Hybrid QoS Networks in the Next Generation Internet, The International Telecommunications Society (ITS) 2000, Buenos Aires, Argentina, July 2000.
2. Winner of the 1999 Beta Phi-Mu Pi Chapter Scholarly Research Paper for a paper entitled QoS-Support for Internet Telephony: Beyond the Best-Effort Nature of the Internet, March 1999.
3. Outstanding Thesis of the Year Award The Prospects for Mobile Satellite Communications and Broadband Satellite Communications: Technical and Regulatory Issues and Trend Analysis, ITP (Interdisciplinary Telecommunications Program)-University of Colorado, Boulder, CO. 1996.
4. Graduate Student Assistantship and Full Tuition Scholarship, The School of Information Sciences, University of Pittsburgh, 1996 - 1999.
5. Excellence in Research and Development, Award in Computing, Hyosung Computer R&D Center, Seoul.
