= D Hwang =

South Korean artist (born 1969)

- 황일동
- Born: Hwang Ildong; 1969 (age 56–57); Seoul, South Korea
- Known for: sculpture, painting
- Website: www.dhwang.org

Hwang Ildong (Korean: 황일동; born 1969), known as "D Hwang", is a South Korean sculptor and painter.

== Biography ==
D Hwang was born in Seoul, South Korea. He had a childhood dream to be a custom motorcycle rider, in which he became both a rider and a designer. D Hwang created his own custom bike company called "MATTEBLACK" in which he was a designer of custom motorcycles. In 2003 and 2004, D Hwang won the Yokohama Hotrod Custom Show (Japan) "Cool Bike Award". His interest in film and video began in 1994 to 2003, D Hwang was involved with the production of films and music videos, which he was a filmmaker, director and screenplay writer for the entertainment industry. 2012 D Hwang is involved with the film industry of South Korea. D Hwang obtained his BFA in 1997 from the Parsons School of Design, a division of The New School.

== GARAT series ==
GS series GS(GARAT Sculpture) series of Garage and Art, is Industrial Expressionism. D Hwang reveals emotions of himself as an artist, while he lives through oppressive systems of a contemporary society. The GS series gives D Hwang a sense of identity through his works of art. He has said "With the start of a bit rebellious motivation, the theme of the GS series is ironically freedom, not oppression". The GS series was created by welding metal materials from waste by-products of an industrial industry. GARAT maintains a purely anarchistic position, revolting against the mainstream norm of "shock values of contemporary art". GARAT re-discovers and practices the essential values of labor in art, something lost in contemporary art.

The GS-01 of the GS series, is in the shape of a motorcycle, its smooth curvy design is symbolic of speed and dynamics.

OGS-01 is the image of a tree, a natural shape with roots revealed. It is an Iron metal sculpture that was oxidized by water, which creates a natural alive look, with a design that gives it an illusion of movement.

== Painting and mixed media work ==
D Hwang records his life through experimental variations of mediums in his works of art, seen with "Self-portrait II "(2007), and "Here Lie the Mortal Remains"series (2007-2008).

" Zen In Disappearing Earth Series" is a crossover for D Hwang, he has said that "Zen In Disappearing Earth" (2009) is the bridge between industrial expressionism to minimal expressionism." The mediums used are a mixture of oil on metal board, mixed media on wood board and wood, acrylic board. Zen in Disappearing Earth represents the experiences that have held D Hwang's in isolation, during his journey as an evolving artist. He has exhibited his work around the globe.

Zen in Disappearing Earth Series, 2009 Oil on metal board, 70.8X24.4cm

== Film ==
D Hwang has produced and directed films, and written screenplays since the mid-1990s. His most recent work is called "The Painter" Presented by Studio Garat, Directed by D Hwang South Korea. Starring Deok-ho Han as "The Painter".

== Film and director ==
Year	Film and videos
1994	Assistant directed "Beyond sky" (16mm movie)
1997	Edited "Cut runs deep" (35mm feature film)
1997	Directed "501"(Digital movie)
1999	Directed musician "Awesome" music video (35mm)
1999	Directed commercial film for Local TV station in New York
1999	Created 3D animation for music video & TV
2000	Techno music band "Samadi" as a singer
2000	Directed musician Yang jin suck "10 years love" music video
2001	Directed "Knock"(Digital movie)
2002	"Knock" invited to Tokyo indies movie festival
2002	Writing screen play "Run to Tokyo" (Digital feature film)
2002	Writing screen play "Killer Suji" (35 mm feature film)
2003	Writing screen play "JULY" (35 mm feature film)
2003	Writing screen play "MAGIE" (35 mm feature film)
2012	Director of "The Painter"

== Exhibitions ==
Year	Exhibitions
1995	1995 "RANDOM ORDER"- Pleiades gallery, New York, NY - group show
1996	1996 "ONE"- Pleiades Gallery, New york, NY - solo show
1997	1997 "HOME MADE AIR"- Tompkin Square Gallery, New York, NY - group show
1999	1999 "PARKING LOT PROJECT"- Art Sonje center, Seoul - group show
2002	2002 "DARK FACE" - Hello art gallery, Seoul - solo show
2003	2003 "YOKOHAMA HOTROD CUSTOM SHOW", Yokohama, Japan
2004	2004 "YOKOHAMA HOTROD CUSTOM SHOW", Yokohama, Japan 2004
2008	October 3, 2008 KOLN ART FAIR21 in Germany -solo show
2008	September 17, 2008 LK LOTUS AWARD with HODU Gallery in Seoul, Korea - solo show
2008	July 2008 "FANTASTIC CONTRAPTION?"Device Gallery in LA, USA - group show
2008	May 16, 2008 "INCINERATION" Youkobo art space in Tokyo, Japan - solo show.
2008	March 12, 2008 "FROM GRAGE" 2x13 gallery in Seoul, Korea - solo show
2008	March 3, 2008 "CARNIVORA" L'Imagerie Gallery in LA, USA - group show
2008	January 12, 2008 "CARNIVORA" C POP Gallery in Detroit, USA - group show
2009	February 12, 2009 "STAR WARS EPISODE II"- UNC gallery in Seoul, Korea - group show
2010	December 3, 2010 "Very christmas" Von Fraunberg art gallery, Düsseldorf, Germany - group show
2011	April 26, 2011, " Symphony no7 in major II, allegretto" Hankuk museum, Yonginshi, South Korea solo show
2011	September 8, 2011, "Symphony no7 in major II, allegretto" Von Fraunberg art gallery, Dusseldolf, Germany - solo show
