= Hwang Hyun-hee =

South Korean model and actress (born 1988)

- 황현희
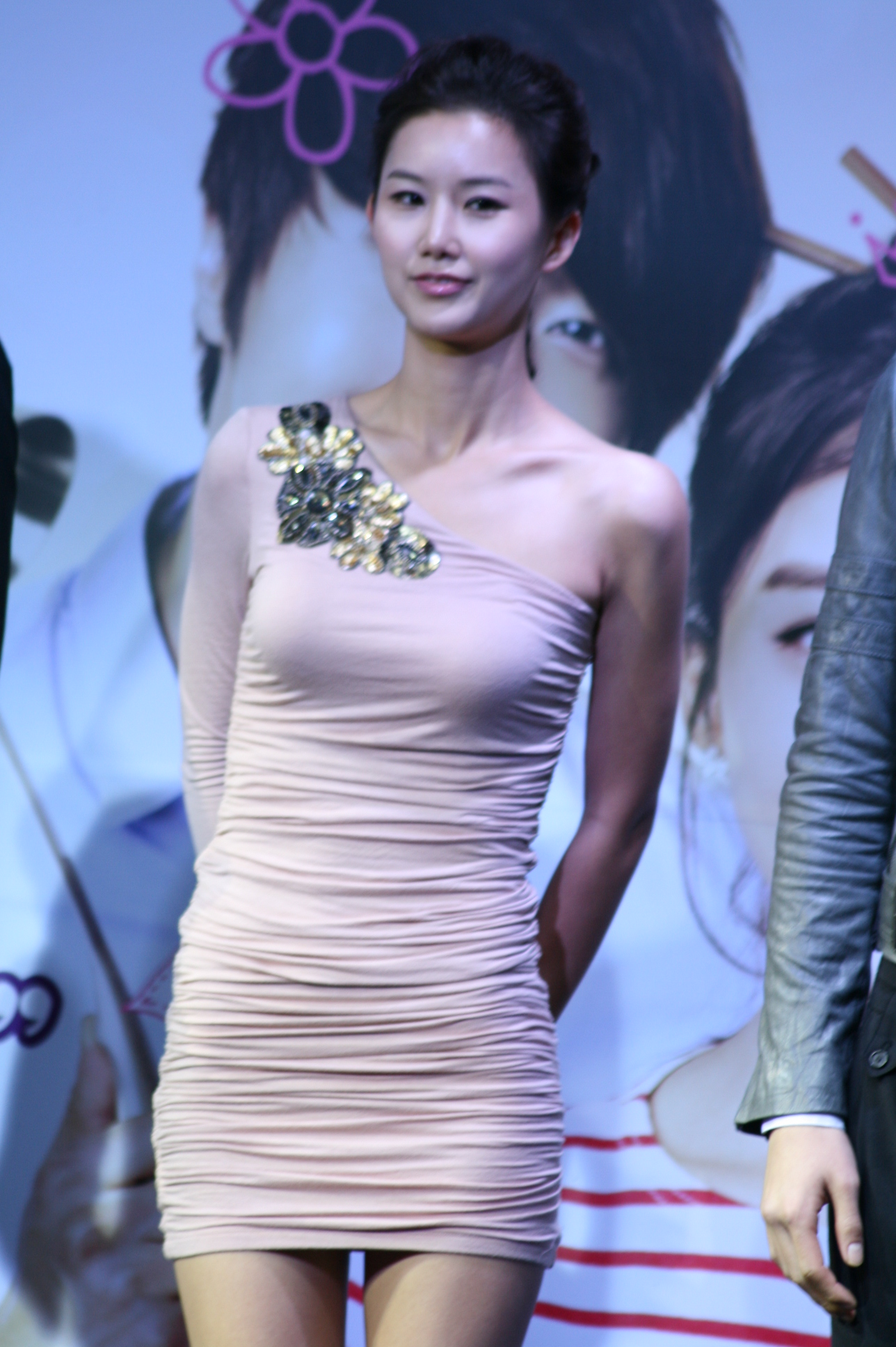
- Hwang in 2011
- Born: February 26, 1988 (age 38); Seoul, South Korea
- Other name: Hosoo
- Education: Seoul Institute of the Arts
- Occupations: Actress; model
- Years active: 2009–present

Hwang Hyun-hee (Korean: 황현희; born 26 February 1988) is a South Korean actress and model. A popular social media figure in South Korea, Hwang has modeled for over ten years and has appeared in numerous major Korean television and film projects. She is a graduate of the Seoul Institute of the Arts. In 2009 she won the 18th Super Model Contest Mac Style Award for her modeling.

She has worked under the modeling agency Tricycle Ent since her debut in 2009.

Hwang's first major television appearance was in 2011 where she played a role in nine episodes of Cool Guys, Hot Ramen. In 2014 Hwang appeared in six episodes of Blade Man. Hwang starred in the 2015 comedic romance film Love Clinic.

== Filmography ==
- The Cicadas in the Day Ward (낮병동의 매미들), 2009
- Cool Guys, Hot Ramen (꽃미남 라면가게), 2011
- Blade Man (아이언맨), 2014
- Love Clinic (연애의 맛), 2015
