= Jaeahn Hwang clan =

Korean clan from North Hwanghae Province

- Country: Korea
- Current region: Hwangju County
- Founder: Hwang Eul gu
- Connected members: Hwang Sun-won; Hwang Tong-gyu; Hwang Jang-yop

Jaeahn Hwang clan (Korean: 제안 황씨; Hanja: 齊安 黃氏) is one of the Korean clans. Their Bon-gwan is in Hwangju County, North Hwanghae Province. According to the research held in 2015, the number of Jaeahn Hwang clan's member was 3098. Their founder was Hwang Eul gu, a great-grandchild of Hwang Seok gi (Hanja: 黃石奇). Hwang Eul gu’s ancestor was Hwang Bo (Hanja: 黃輔) who was a Lu (state) people in China. Hwang Eul gu passed Imperial examination during Goryeo period. Then, he worked as Ijo (이조, 吏曹). After that, he became one of the Gongsin (Hanja: 功臣) members and became Prince of Jaeahn. Hwang Eul gu’s descendants founded Jaeahn Hwang clan and made their Bon-gwan Hwangju because Hwangju was a Prince of Jaeahn's place name.

== See also ==
- Korean clan names of foreign origin
