= Hampyeong Mo clan =

Korean clan from South Jeolla Province

- Country: Korea
- Current region: Hampyeong County
- Founder: Mo Gyeong
- Connected members: Mo Chang-min; Mo Tae-bum; Danielle Marsh

Hampyeong Mo clan (Korean: 함평 모씨; Hanja: 咸平 牟氏) is one of the Korean clans. Their Bon-gwan is in Hampyeong County, South Jeolla Province. According to the research held in 2015, the number of Hampyeong Mo clan was 20644. Their founder was Mo Gyeong who was from Hongnong Commandery (弘農郡; south of present-day Lingbao City, Henan), China. Hampyeong Mo clan worked as minister of civil service affairs (吏部尚書, Hubu Shangshu) and Four-star rank. When Yi Cha-gyŏm revolted, Hampyeong Mo clan was dispatched to put down the rebellion. Hampyeong Mo clan made achievements during the rebellion. Hampyeong Mo clan was awarded Gongsin (Hanja: 功臣), and he was naturalized in Goryeo. After that, Mo Gyeong’s son officially began Hampyeong Mo clan, and his descendant made their Bon-gwan, Hampyeong County because he got the class named Pingzhangshi (Hanja: 平章事) and designated as lord of Hampyeong County.

== See also ==
- Korean clan names of foreign origin
