= Consort Hwang (Yongle) =

Yonglese consort

Consort Hwang 黄妃
- Born: 1401; Kingdom of Joseon
- Died: 1421 (aged 19–20); Beijing
- Spouse: Yongle Emperor
- Clan: Hwang (황; 黄)

Consort Hwang (黄妃; 1401–1421), was a consort of the Yongle Emperor.

She was from Korea, and became a member of the imperial harem of the Yongle Emperor in 1409. She was sent unwillingly to the harem. Upon her arrival, she was interrogated and admitted not to be a virgin and to have had two lovers, one being her brother-in-law. She was still not allowed to leave the harem, however. In 1421, she was one of the many concubines who were accused for having participated in a conspiracy to murder the emperor. She was arrested and interrogated. She was executed for attempted murder of the emperor.
