= Sang-Min Whang =

South Korean psychologist and author

Sang Min Whang
- 황상민
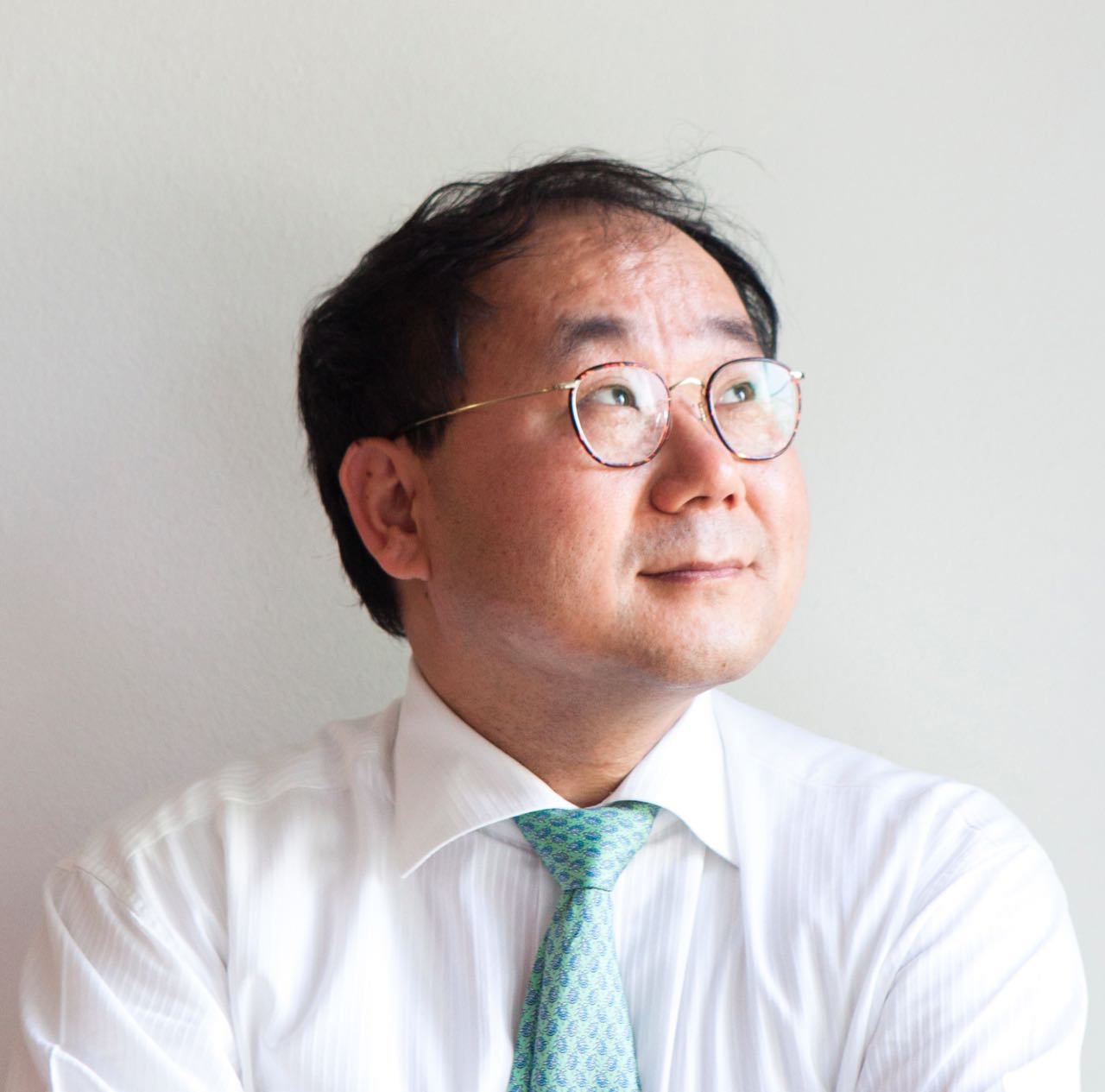
- Born: November 10, 1962 (age 63); Jinhae-gu
- Education: Seoul National University; Harvard University
- Known for: WPI (Whang's Personal Identity), Political Commentary, Counseling
- Scientific career
- Fields: Psychology; Personality Psychology; Q methodology
- Workplaces: Yonsei University; Sejong University; WPI Painfree Center
- Academic advisors: Sheldon White

Sang Min Leo Whang (November 10, 1962 - ) is a South Korean psychologist, author, and popular political commentator. He has empirically investigated "the Korean Peoples' identity & their mass-psychology" by connecting it to a variety of issues such as self, online world identity, consumption behavior, love & relationships, power desire and political decision making. He has mainly researched the different psychological types of people and how the human mind works in on and offline settings. His most well-known projects are WPI (Whang's Personal Identity), research on the identities of online game players, and research on politicians' public images. Whang has been a professor at Sejong University from 1994 to 1997 and at Yonsei University from 1997 to 2016. In January 2016, he was dismissed from his position as a tenured professor at Yonsei University, by excuse of violating an ethical rule, 'having a job outside of professorship without the permission of the university president.' There is controversy and speculation surrounding his dismissal. The unusual dismissal of a tenured professor from his position was a retaliatory decision made because of Whang's criticism against Geun-hye Park, the 11th President of South Korea. She was later impeached and dismissed from the presidency. Whang's dismissal was planned and executed by the late president of Yonsei University, Gap Young Cheung who denied his involvement of this case as a president of university. The late president Gap Young Cheung had a strong reputation that he had wished to hold a government or Blue House position during Ms. Park's presidency. After the impeachment of Ms. Park, Cheung retired from the university and remained as an honorary professor. Whang's dismissal is appreciated as an example of an evidence of latent oppression on academia by power. Dr. Whang currently runs a podcast WhangShimSo, where he provides free consultations on personal and career conflicts, and commentates on the diverse social issues in Korean Society.

== Early life and family ==
He was born as a second child in the town of Jinhae, and lived there until he was 9 years old when his parents decided to move to the bigger city of Pusan for the opportunity to better educate their children. He has said the thought “I need to do well academically in order to be treated like a person” was a motivating factor in his youth to study hard. In an interview with Chosun Ilbo, he recalled “Once I received grades that put me in 25th place in class and the kids who used to ask me questions during recess stopped asking me any questions. They would not even reply when I said something. What was even more surprising was that kids who were known to be physically dominant in the class started bothering me. It was strange. So I came in 2nd place in class on the next test. The teacher told me to stop playing with grades. And the other kids treated me normally again. This led me to think that in Korean society I need to do well academically in order to be treated properly as a person even before having any idea of what I really want to do.”

== Education and academic career ==
Since his postdoctoral fellowship, Sang Min Whang focused on the “human mind that operates in the Internet.” Under the guidance of Rob Kling at University of California, Irvine, he started research on the mind in the PC network environment and was a pioneer in early research on the virtual world. He accurately predicted that shopping and other real life activities will occur over the Internet and classified the characteristics of the type of person who first finds new electronic products and the characteristics of the consumer that spreads the use of new electronic products. (Refer to "Digital Freaks Decide Future Consumption")

=== Academic career and research ===
In his life as a researcher, Sang Min Whang delved into the subject of the “self,” especially “identification and respect for an individual's disposition” based on the study of “Korean Peoples’ Identity.” In particular, he researched the relationship between “the self oneself perceives” and “the self others perceive,” or the “real self” and the “ideal self” Koreans experience and build in various aspects by connecting it to specific fields in education, development, politics, marketing, etc. He especially asserts that instead of the medical model that defines a student or a child's particular behavior as a “problem” and tries to solve it, the “developmental perspective,” which helps a student or a child understand herself by diagnosing and understanding each individual's character and the meaning each individual attributes to her actions, needs to be applied to education and psychotherapy.

==== Research on Koreans' psychology ====
===== WPI (Whang's Personal Identity) =====
Sang Min Whang thought there needs to be a tool differentiated from the western psychology tests to measure “Koreans’ psychology” because Asians and Westerners define and think about “the self” in different ways. In the field of personality study, the Big 5 Theory of Personality (openness to experience, conscientiousness, extraversion, agreeableness, neuroticism) was already known to exist through Costa & McCrae and others’ research. However, Sang Min Whang thought these five factors would combine and manifest in different ways depending on the sociocultural environment and an individual's experience and beliefs. According to the metaphor he uses frequently, it is important to know the fact that “when making bread, the ingredients you need are ‘flour,’ ‘eggs,’ ‘milk,’ ‘yeast,’ and ‘butter.’ But the bread is not the ingredient. It only becomes bread when you mix the ingredients together to make the dough, proof it, put it in the oven, and bake it. Likewise, a person's mind becomes known not by the score from individual psychological traits or factors, but only after going through a larger frame that can look at those comprehensively.” (<<Reading Your Own Mind (2016), 325p>> He was able to classify two dimensional types, the self that yourself sees (I), and the self that others see (Me) based on Q Methodology and after constructing many statements indicating Koreans’ emotion, lifestyle, and behavior pattern based on the Big 5 Theory of Personality. The way Koreans define themselves have been differentiated into 5 types: (I) Realist, Romantist, Humanist, Idealist, and Agent, and the way they define themselves using others as a medium (Me) was differentiated into these 5 types: Relation, Trust, Manual, Self, and Culture. His findings empirically proved how William James’ theory that the “self” is a combination of “the self that yourself thinks of (I)” and “the self that others see (Me)” manifests itself in a specific sociocultural setting and WPI (Whang's Personal Identity) has been organized as a personality test that is being used in counseling and education.

===== WPI's 5 Types =====
- Realist: A realist tries to have good relationships with other people because he or she acquires his or her sense of being through others’ acknowledgement. She or he is considerate of other people and caters well to others because she or he does not like big changes or conflicts, but also goes through heartache or a “good person complex” as a result. In any organization, if there is not a lot of conflict within it, it could be due to the work of a Realist. Realists think of the organization they belong to, their wealth, and their academic pedigrees as measures they can use to gain others’ recognition and they also strive for self-improvement in order to live textbook definitions of successful lives, which are decided on by the outside world.
- Romanticist: Romanticists feel alive when they share their feelings with others. If a Romanticist, for whom the sharing of sensibilities and emotions are important, feels that his or her feelings are not appreciated then he or she may have a heart that is the more impoverished than anyone else even though he or she may be living an abundant life. A Romanticist's sensibility, delicate like a glass bead, is sometimes also expressed in an artistic sense. Additionally, when working on something new, Romanticists might appear to be very hesitant because they have a lot of fear and anxiety, but on the contrary, they may also appear to be meticulous and deliberate.
- Humanist: Humanists acquire their sense of being through relationships with people. They are out-going, sociable and friendly. They have the ability to utilize their personal networks to solve problems. In contrast, they also show a side where they start off strong and end weak by setting up grand goals without being detailed enough and have difficulty putting in any effort for a long time to achieve said goals. They think it is a matter-of-course and natural to treat superiors with respect and to appear authoritative to subordinates. They can be confident in their ability to build relationships, but they have a hard time noticing delicate and subtle feelings.
- Idealist: Idealists acquire their sense of being when they feel free and gain an understanding about the world. They seek something of their own that is different from others, which gives the impression of being idealistic, abstract, and disconnected from reality. Also, they may appear to another person to be selfish and individualistic at times because idealists are only concerned with what they're interested in and indifferent to everything else. They prefer spending time alone and try to live independently. Idealists can change their interests frequently because they have a lot of curiosity and are creative, but it is important above all else for idealists to become immersed in one thing and build their own expertise.
- Agent: Agents acquire their sense of being through their achievements. Their work is what they are and they feel a joy greater than anything else when they complete a task in the way they wanted to. They have a tendency to prioritize work above relationships and they do not like someone meddling in their work process. This is because they enjoy themselves becoming immersed in the process of their work as it progresses as they have planned. This tendency may also connect to their hobbies. If they start to approach their hobbies like it is work, they can become scarily absorbed and bring to mind the image of an obsessive-compulsive otaku (geek).

==== Koreans’ desires and "the Relationship between image and true self" ====
In "The President and Louis Vuitton", Sang Min Whang thought (luxury good) consumption and elections clearly showed how Koreans’ dress up their desires instead of saying what they want, thinking that if they choose the vaguely “good thing,” it will produce the results they want. When you make a decision to dress up your desire without being able to distinguish between “what you really want” and “what you are saying you want,” you feel “duped” and cannot be satisfied even after spending money. On the other hand, he suggested “the mind's MRI,” a development from Q Methodology, for suppliers to use as a method to diagnose the consumer's hidden desire and the desire they freely talk of in a societal setting.

== Dismissal from Yonsei University and controversy ==
=== Criticism against Geun Hye Park's Regime and Dismissal from Yonsei University's full professorship ===
In May 2015, Sang Min Whang researched the types of image the public has about the then President Geun Hye Park using Q Methodology and published his findings in the monthly magazine Shin Dong Ah with the title “Foolish Ruler> Face Madame >Our VIP.” According to Whang's research, people perceived Ms. Park mainly as a “puppet.” The “puppet” image the majority of people had of Ms. Park was divided into more detailed types: foolish ruler, our VIP, and face Madame. The study simultaneously found the public expected a president with the image of a “leading hero” as an alternative to Park. This meant the public already knew through her image that Park is incompetent and, at the same time, only a sort of “ceremonious figure” with someone else calling the shots. She was being perceived as a leader that did not have the ability to govern a nation.

After publishing his “President Geun Hye Park Image” research in Shin Dong Ah magazine, Sang Min Whang was sent to Yonsei University's disciplinary committee for “violation of prohibition on holding a job outside of professorship and violation of prohibition on engaging in commercial activity” and the former Yonsei University president, Gap Young Cheung, who was being mentioned as a potential minister nominee in Geun Hye Park's regime, passed the dismissal motion on his last day in office on January 29, 2016. Yonsei University has claimed there is no relation between Sang Min Whang's research and the exclusionary disciplinary action and that he was removed because of “holding concurrent offices,” but through the Soon Sil Choi affair it was proven Sang Min Whang's research predicted the hidden commander's existence. The retaliatory decision to dismiss a tenured professor, along with Yoo Ra Chung's illicit admission incident, showed that universities lost academic autonomy and became an instrument of political power.

Professor Ho Geun Lee from Yonsei University, who agreed to an interview with Dong-A Ilbo newspaper, claimed that if Whang had only “violated the prohibition on holding a job outside of professorship and the prohibition on engaging in commercial activity” then he would not have been dismissed and implied that Whang was dismissed because he was negligent in carrying out his duties as a professor. Lee cited examples such as Whang's absence from meetings with professors, scheduling all of his courses to teach on one day during the week, and managing an outside research lab named Wisdom Center even though Whang did a lot of research. However, it was confirmed Sang Min Whang did not receive any salary or engage in any commercial activity for profit and only conducted research by accepting projects through Wisdom Center. In Korea and in the U.S., it is difficult for the excuse “holding another office outside of professorship” to be the grounds for dismissal because many professors in both countries establish their own research labs to work more freely on research or they hold offices at companies in related areas of study. Ultimately, according to Lee's interview, Yonsei University presented the reasons that Whang was “negligent” because he did not attend the professor meetings and fit all of his courses into one day to remove a tenured, full professor with satisfactory research performance. This kind of measure taken by Yonsei University is one of the examples of how people who satirized Geun Hye Park were oppressed under the regime.

Gap Young Cheung, who removed Sang Min Whang from Yonsei University, was one of the figures being mentioned as a nominee for the first chief of staff or the minister of economy under Geun Hye Park's regime, but he unable to take a government post. Afterwards, he tried for reappointment of Yonsei University's president, but failed after “being ranked as the lowest among potential candidates on performance and qualifications in an opinion gathering session by Yonsei University faculty.” After the next term (18th) president of Yonsei University was decided to be Yong Hak Kim, the dismissal procedure for Whang progressed quickly. Gap Young Cheung signed the dismissal resolution on his last day of his president term and announced it is “chance” that the two dates coincide. Some analyze Gap Young Cheung's removal of Sang Min Whang, who continued to maintain a critical tone of Geun Hye Park's regime on a daily basis, as a move Cheung made to become appointed to public office under Geun Hye Park's regime. However, Gap Young Cheung claimed in an interview with the press that he “did not know” about Sang Min Hwang's dismissal from Yonsei University's professorship and that he only followed the decision of the disciplinary committee even though he was Yonsei University's president when the dismissal process was in progress. These actions by Gap Young Cheung along with the illicit admission of Yoo Ra Chung into Ewha University is analyzed as a case of how university personnel have transformed into, not people who pursue learning, but rather agents of political power under Geun Hye Park's regime.

In other instances of abuse of power, it became known Geun Hye Park's regime not only made the conglomerate CJ group discontinue the Saturday Night Live television program that satirized Geun Hye Park, but also exerted pressure on CJ group's human resources to influence management position appointments within the company. This example shows thorough vindictive punishment was carried out against people who revealed the true nature of Geun Hye Park's regime by applying “charges that do not have anything to do with the regime.” Like how in the dynasty era the suspicion of “having taken part in a conspiracy” was cast on everyone to cause a “purge” to happen and was used as an excuse to punish people, in Geun Hye Park's regime where she was called the “queen” by the masses, the suspicion of “having engaged in profit-seeking activity” that could easily incur hatred among people was used to discipline a company that could legitimately engage in profit-seeking activity and discipline a professor who had the right to freely research.

The attempt to discipline Sang Min Whang in 2015 was not the first time. In 2014, he was sent to the disciplinary action committee for “lack of research production and negligence in teaching students,” but the charge fell apart after it was revealed not to be true. This is because in 2014 when Sang Min Whang was sent to the disciplinary action committee, he did five presentations in international and domestic academic societies and published one dissertation and the book The Person That Is Me. Also, he was on the editing staff for the Journal of Human Subjectivity and was editor-in-chief of the Korean Society for the Study of Human Subjectivity. In the following year of 2015, he published "The New Consumer Psychology: Scanning buying behavior with MRI of the Mind" through Routledge, America's publishing company specializing in social sciences. In addition, when the genital scandal arose, Sung Joo Kim who was the co-chair of the Presidential Campaign Committee for Saenuri party, visited Yonsei University demanding Sang Min Whang's resignation from professorship and revealed that she was promised disciplinary action by Yonsei University. It was brought up that Sung Joo Kim may be a member of the hidden power organization called “eight fairies” related to the Soon Sil Choi scandal, but she denied the allegation.

Professor Chang Yong Kim, who asserts that he also experienced the dangers of disadvantages caused by criticizing the regime, criticized Yonsei University's actions against Whang and warned against the current danger the state of social sciences is in Korea and scholars’ freedom becoming limited by saying as follows:

“He was easily terminated by the so-called “genital” comment even though he was a full professor who was guaranteed retirement (tenure). If you look at it, what is wrong with this comment? It was nothing more than an ordinary opinion, not degradation nor defamation.

After being terminated, professor Whang appeared on a TV program and claimed, “I became an object of hatred after defining Geun Hye Park as a ‘foolish ruler’ and even if there was pressure to terminate me from the Blue House because of this, the faculty council and university president should have stepped forward acting as a shield saying it [my comment] is within academic domain. This is evidence that universities have become trash…”

Even if a college professor is guaranteed retirement, he still has to assume risk when practicing the “freedom of expression” guaranteed by the constitution against political authority. It is especially not easy to raise your voice of criticism against a living authority figure such as a president or a minister.

… The constitutionally guaranteed “freedom of expression,” “freedom of the press, “academic freedom” are being threatened and even terminated or removed by thoughtless people. When even the professorship is shaken by the outside wind, the freedom of expression in this country shrinks and praises like “it is sunny when the president appears” and sugar-coated reports become rampant in the media.

As long as the president, who does not want to hear anything unpleasant to the ear and only wants to hear praise and glorification, and the people close to her do not change, then the pundit class does not speak out when the constitution is threatened and specifically when freedom of expression has been violated.”

Sang Min Whang's research that became grounds for termination was “An Investigation into the President's Image” that started in 2014. It was shown the image the public has of the president can be divided into 8 types through this research. The following is the body of the research explanation that was published in Shin Dong Ah.

“To the public that perceives President Park as a ‘foolish ruler,’ she is like “a king that tries to privatize the country.” Above all, she is an “incompetent and lazy” leader. She is a person who does not take responsibility and only has the desire for power. She cannot tolerate a competent subordinate and is strongly likely to engage in random behavior in order to maintain power. So the public is anxious and fearful the foolish ruler may do something a senseless child might do. Above all, to a foolish ruler, the people and the country is a means to satisfy her desires. She likely regards ‘the country=power=me.’

Even with this kind of presidential image, she is a fine enough leader for those who want to maintain conservative power. She could even be a really needed leader if one's gains or interests fit well together with the president. However, the people who see President Park in the image of the foolish ruler has the thought “the country has been left to someone who is incompetent and causes uneasiness with the possibility she may do something preposterous.” The public having this kind of image about the president does not, by any means, mean that “the president is this kind of person.” It just means some perceive the president as a foolish king.

The more the public think the president is a foolish king, the more the image of the political leader they desperately want becomes the “great commander (strategist).” A great commander who torments and agonizes himself and at the same time tries to change society. He may more or less fall short in taking actual action or combat because he is a strategist, but the public is satisfied with a leader who provides direction to keep the people from feeling confused. It is the image of a leader who can tell us the tasks and crisis our society faces and can solve it together. This kind of image stands out more when the uncertainty of the current situation becomes greater.”

This research was made into PCIC (President Candidate Image Checklist) that diagnoses what kind of wish, desire, and belief people have of a particular politician and is being utilized as material that analyzes the public image of tentative presidential candidates in current event programs.

=== Genitals remark dispute ===
Sang Min Whang appeared on the 219th episode of the television program “Gordian Knot” and discussed the phenomenon that Park, who was a presidential candidate at the time, was being advertised as the “first female president.” Sung Joo Kim, who was the co-chair of the presidential campaign committee of Saenuri party at the time, visited Yonsei University in protest and demanded Whang's resignation from professorship in relation to this incident and appeared on Hyun Jung Kim's news show and testified that she received a promise from Yonsei University to send Sang Min Whang to the disciplinary action committee.

== Criticism of college star athletes preferential treatment and Yuna Kim Show controversy ==
Sang Min Whang who was a regular on CBS Radio's “Mi Hwa Kim's Everybody” program criticized colleges’ preferential treatment of its sports stars on May 22, 2012.

<Sang Min Whang's summarized speech from “Mi Hwa Kim's Everybody” radio program, May 22nd, 2012>

When did Yuna Kim go to college? Do you go practice teaching as you graduate high school? When we say diligence it means practicing an undertaking consistently well. It is true athlete Kim (Yuna Kim) is busy but it does not mean she practiced teaching diligently. If Yuna Kim goes to teaching practice, does it mean she fulfilled all the prerequisites to become a student-teacher by going to class assiduously for 4 years in college and received grades for completing courses? Yuna Kim trains mainly abroad for personal or national work and goes around abroad. Is Korea University a school that lets one graduate with no classes required? We provide a lot of special benefits for sports stars exempting them from military service and paying them a lot of money. Either Yuna Kim's parents or the school is teaching athlete Kim, who is trying to become a teacher, the wrong way. Yuna Kim receiving a certificate as if she is collecting them may be thought of as her just showing her face and receiving a certificate from a regular student-teacher's position. The college is using stars like Kim for marketing in order to make their name known among the public. A college has given up being a college and stooped to the level of gaining publicity like a regular corporation.”

Unlike Sang Min Whang's intention to discuss “Korean universities’ utilizing students as a means for gaining publicity and the preferential treatment of elite sports athletes,” he became embroiled in the controversy of “fact checking Yuna Kim's teaching practice.” A teacher from Yuna Kim's teaching practice site, Seoul Jinseon Girls' High School, refuted in an interview on “Mi-hwa Kim's Everybody” to “please check the fact that [Yuna Kim] is coming to school and diligently coming to practice teaching” and on June 6 Yuna Kim's management company, All That Sports, sued Sang Min Whang for slander saying “there are parts of what he said that are untrue that he spoke of as if it were true and because that damages the athlete's honor we are taking legal measures.” However, they also left the possibility of dropping the lawsuit open by saying, “we can drop the suit at any time if professor Whang apologizes for the false information that was not checked.”

On the controversy surrounding his comments, Whang said “I think it is possible to specially grant college admission to any number of (star athletes). But on whether the athletes receive a proper education while going to college, on whether colleges have a real interest in educating these students, right now they do not” and “they are only a means to gain publicity and the students grow up really as sports machines completely swayed by sports. And when that student graduates from college is he or she really a person at the intellectual level of a person who graduated from a 4-year university? And later when [that person] does a masters or doctorate program and even becomes a professor in that field, we already saw through athlete Dae Sung Moon's case how the dissertation is not written but copied from other sources” and “we discussed this issue from the perspective of psychological reasoning, from the side of let's think about this aspect, but if [Yuna Kim] thought of this as talking about her and sues then who in Korea would raise questions about a problem or issue that makes us frustrated?” Whang expressed his frustrations for having been weirdly attacked for trying to raise an educational issue. He did not back down from his opinion saying, “I just called it as I saw it,” but apologized for the discomfort Yuna Kim may have felt being taken as an example and stepped down from the radio program “Mi Hwa Kim's Everybody.”

== Life after dismissal ==
At the end of 2016, the occurrence of "Geun Hye Park–Soon Sil Choi Gate" shed new light on Sang Min Whang's dismissal from Yonsei University in the press and in politics. He also took this time to reset his own values, which can be known from his words in the following: "If I could do what was enjoyable to me then I was not going to be concerned with anything else and tried hard to be indifferent and lived thinking "a professor's duty is only to do research." I tried to live detached from the power struggle as an aloof scholar who would occasionally observe it from afar and provide advice. But in Korea, after knowing the truth that I cannot do the work I enjoy and do well at all outside of its influence... I realized the truth that I was terminated because my desire to stay as an aloof scholar was not as clear compared to those who tried to gain power who had very clear desires and was thorough in their pursuit of it. So I thought I should no longer stay as an observer... The people were also deceived by Lee-Myung-Park-Geun-Hye because they did not face what they want and did not make it clear enough." After diagnosing the Korean peoples' mind as being in "a state of slavery" in relation to the "Geun Hye Park–Soon Sil Choi Gate," Whang spoke out more proactively and clearly on his opinions in politics in the press and on his podcast after his dismissal, and is leading "the Korean Peoples' Psychological Independence Movement" with the public through the podcast Whangshimso.
