= Moh Youn-sook =

South Korean writer (1910–1990)

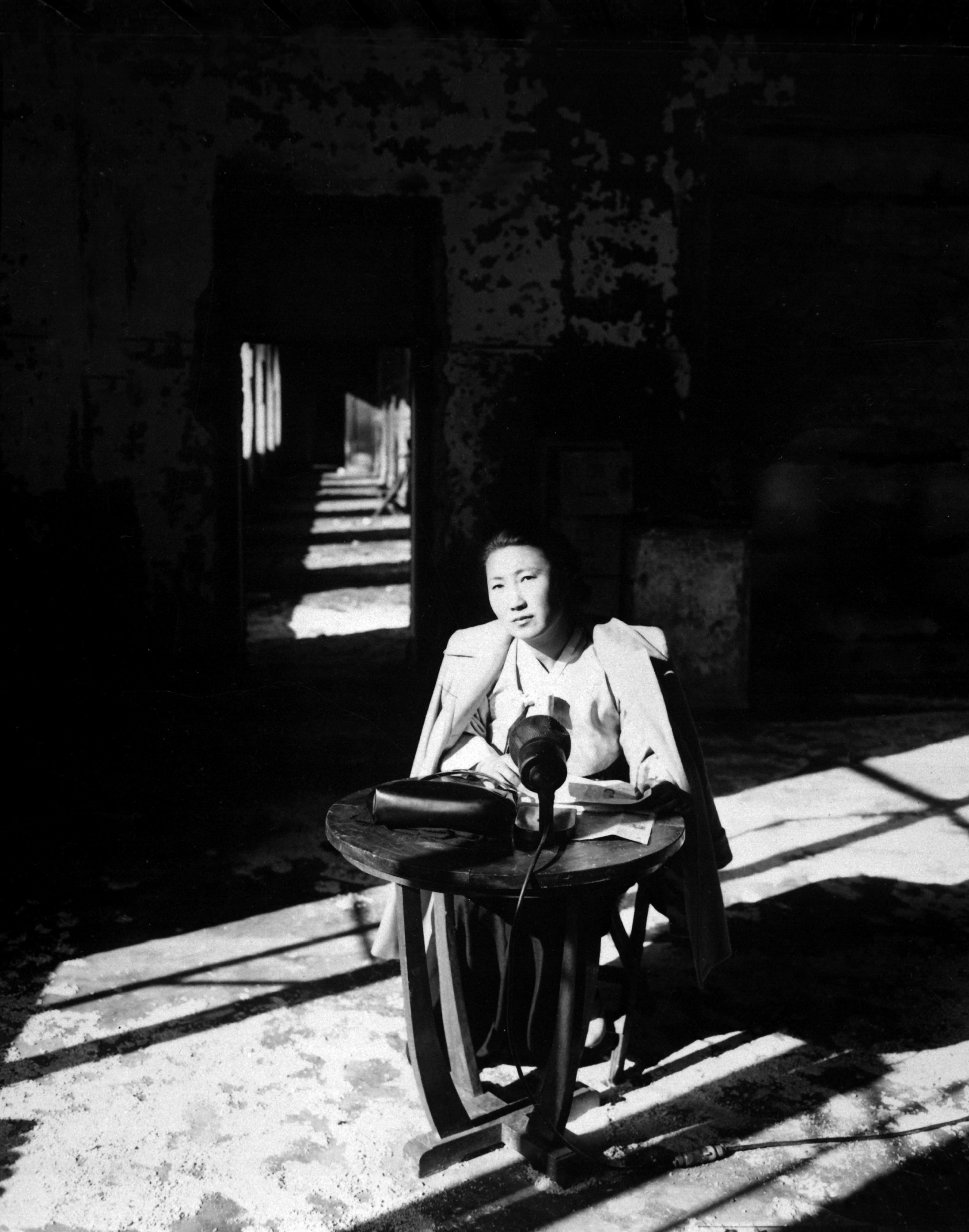
- Born: March 5, 1910
- Died: June 7, 1990 (aged 80)
- Writing career
- Language: Korean

Korean name
- Hangul: 모윤숙
- Hanja: 毛允淑
- RR: Mo Yunsuk
- MR: Mo Yunsuk

Moh Youn-sook (Korean: 모윤숙; March 5, 1910 – June 7, 1990) was a Korean poet.

== Life ==
In her youth, Youn-sook became acquainted with a circle of friends, including the alleged secret agent Kim Soo-im.

Moh Youn-sook's pen name was Yeongun. She was born in Wonsan, South Hamyong Province on March 5, 1910. She attended Hamheung Yeongsaeng Girls' School, Hosudon Girls' School, and graduated from Ewha Technical College, majoring in Literature. She taught at Jiando Myeongsin and Baewha Girls' High schools, and was a reporter for Samcheollisa and Joongang Broadcasting Company. In 1940, she was detained at Gyeonggi-do Police Station for writing the poems "Joseonui ttal" and "I saengmyeong". After Korea gained independence from Japan, she remained active not only in literature but also in various other fields. Moh participated in the 1948 UN General Assembly as a representative of Korea; she also attended the 1954 establishment of the Korean Division of the International Pen Club, consecutively filling various posts. She served as committee chairwoman of the Korean Freedom Literary Association, head committee member of All Literature, committee chairwoman of Korean Division of International Pen Club, committee vice-chairwoman for the International Pen Club, and president of Korea's Contemporary Poetry Association. She died on June 7, 1990.

== Work ==
Her early poetry, often criticized for indulging in facile emotionalism and sentimentalism, is marked by vivid imagery and direct language. Her intense and often frustrated patriotism ramifies into the issues of history, national territory, nature, and provincial affairs. In 1940, Moh was still deeply involved in publications and writing, but like many of her contemporaries, she was forced to tailor her works to the political policies of the Japanese. Under colonial rule, she gradually turned to writing poetry containing no political, social, or historical references whatsoever. After the Liberation, however, she once again composed highly inspiring patriotic pieces celebrating the prevailing nationalistic consciousness of the period.

== Works in Translation ==
- Wren's Elegy, prose, The Pagoda, an epic & Other Poems (렌의 애가)

== Works in Korean (partial) ==
Poetry Collections

- Binnaneun Jiyeok
- Okbinyeo
- Pungnang,
- Jeonggyeong
- Pungto
- Nongae
- Mo Yunsuk Sijeonjip,
- Gukguneun jugeoseo malhanda

== Awards ==
- National Outstanding Citizen's Award
- Arts Award
- Samil Prize
