= Serra Miyeun Hwang =

American composer (born 1962)

- Born: 1962 (age 63–64); Seoul, South Korea
- Education: University of Michigan
- Era: Contemporary

Korean name
- Hangul: 황미연
- Hanja: 黃美衍
- RR: Hwang Miyeon
- MR: Hwang Miyŏn

Serra Miyeun Hwang (born 1962) is an American composer. Her work uses elements of Korean folk music. She is also a percussionist, playing Korean drums.

== Biography ==
Hwang was born in Seoul, South Korea and emigrated to the United States as a teen. In 1988, she was the composer who won the University of Michigan's Concerto Competition. Hwang was also the winner of the 1992 Search for New Music Competition sponsored by the International Alliance for Women in Music (IAWM). Hwang did her undergraduate work at the University of California, Santa Barbara. In 1993, she earned her PhD in Musical Arts in Musical Composition, along with a minor in ethnomusicology from the University of Michigan. After finishing her degrees, she spent time in London and in Jeonju as an adjunct professor at Jeonju University.

== Work ==
Hwang's work incorporates both drums and folk music from Korea in her compositions. Her work on Beckoning (2012) "augments solo cello with Korean drums to evoke memories of her childhood in Seoul, Korea." Her piece, Sojourn (2004), uses traditional Korean drum rhythms and the piano. Chan E. Park in The World of Music, describes Hwang's compositions as "liberating" both Western-style music and the folk sounds of Korean kugak into something that becomes "'fresh music for foreigners' while 'returning to roots' by honoring past traditions."
