= Changwon Hwang clan =

Korean clan from South Gyeongsang Province

- Country: Korea
- Current region: Changwon
- Founder: Hwang Yang chung Hwang Chung jun Hwang Seok gi
- Connected members: Hwang In-youp; Hwang Min-hyun; Hwang Hyun-jin; Hwang Ye-ji; Hwang Mi-young
- Website: cwhwang.or.kr

Changwon Hwang clan (Korean: 창원 황씨; Hanja: 昌原 黃氏) is a Korean clan. With its bon-gwan in Changwon, South Gyeongsang Province, it remains the largest Hwang clan in South Korea.

== Origins ==
Hwang Rak (Hanja: 黄洛), a minister in the Han dynasty, began the clan in Korea after being cast ashore on his way to Vietnam in 28 CE and then being naturalized in Silla. Their founders was Hwang Seok gi, Hwang Chung jun and Hwang Yang chung, who were descendants of Hwang Rak.

== Notable clan members ==
- Hwang In-youp
- Hwang Hyun-jin
- Hwang Ye-ji
- Hwang Mi-young
- Hwang Min-hyun
- Hwang Ho-dong
- Hwang Kyo-ahn
- Hwang Sok-yong
- Hwang Woo-yea
- Hwang Woo-suk

== See also ==
- Foreign clans in Korean
