= Korean clans =

- Hangul: 본관
- Hanja: 本貫
- RR: bongwan
- MR: pon'gwan

Statutory term
- Hangul: 본
- Hanja: 本
- RR: bon
- MR: pon

Korean clans are groups of Korean people that share a paternal ancestor. They are indicated by the combination of a bongwan (Korean: 본관; lit. 'place of origin') and a family name. Although commonly called bongwan, the term used in South Korean law is bon (Korean: 본; lit. 'origin').

Korean clans distinguish families that share their family name. The bongwan identifies descent groups by geographic location of origin. For example, the Gyeongju Kim and the Gimhae Kim are considered different families. They share the family name Kim but have different bongwan: Gyeongju and Gimhae. Some families share a bongwan and trace their origin to a common paternal ancestor but are considered distinct. For example, the Gimhae Kim clan and the Gimhae Heo clan share Suro of Geumgwan Gaya as their common paternal ancestor.

The bongwan and the surname are passed on from a father to his children to denote paternal lineage. A bongwan does not change by marriage or normal adoption. A clan name is not considered part of a Korean person's name; it can be considered rude to call a person by their clan name.

Families in Korea have one of the most meticulous and comprehensive systems of ancestry tracking in the world. Still, counts of surnames and clan names differ. The population and housing census of 2000 conducted by Statistics Korea found 286 surnames and 4,179 clans, while the 2015 census reported 1,507 surnames and 36,744 family clans.

== History ==
The Korean bongwan system was adapted from the Chinese family clan system. It is assumed to have been created around the late Silla and early Goryeo period as a result of Silla's sinicization policies. Taejo of Goryeo promoted the bongwan system to stably distribute a growing population and create a basis for tax revenue, whilst putting an end to the obsolete bone-rank system.

Numerous clans were created throughout local administrations of all sizes and statuses. Almost all Koreans, including the Yangmin and Cheonmin caste, identified with a bongwan from the early Goryeo to the Joseon period. A bongwan affiliated with a prosperous region was widely seen as a source of personal pride, while members from a lesser or impoverished bongwan often sought to escape their genealogical status. Changes in administrative divisions profoundly influenced the merging or creation of various clans.

During the mid-to-late Joseon Dynasty, poor Koreans (commoners and members of the "surname-less class") acquired surnames by purchasing the right to adopt them. Some even fabricated family trees (jokbo) to claim ancestry from prestigious clans. This phenomenon was influenced by government policies related to slaves and a desire to elevate their social status. By the time that the Joseon class system was officially abolished in 1894, nearly all Koreans had a surname.

== Restrictions on marriage and adoption ==
Traditionally, a man and a woman in the same clan could not marry, so the combination of the bongwan and the family name of a husband had to differ from that of a wife. This restriction was ruled unconstitutional by the South Korean Constitutional Court in 1997. Surname and a bongwan does not change on marriage.

In South Korea, when adopting a child as a plenary adoption, the adopted child takes the family name and the bon of the dominant (patrilineal or matrilineal) side of the parent.

When adopting a child as a ordinary adoption, which does not terminate the child's relations with the birth parents, the family name and the bon of the adopted child does not change.

== Creation or adoption of a bongwan ==
Under the South Korean law, a new surname and a bon may be established with the permission of the family court. This procedure is available to a naturalized Korean citizen who uses a non-Korean surname, as well as to a person whose exact lineages are unknown.

If a naturalized Korean citizen wishes to found a surname and a bon, they need to first get a permission of a family court, and found a surname in a Family Relation Registration Office. If the naturalized Korean citizen gained a permission of a family court but did not found a surname and a bon within a month of gaining a permission, an administrative fine of up to 50,000 won could be imposed.

The determination of a surname and bon for a person whose parents are unknown is left to the discretion of the family court. When the person was found in Seoul, the court generally designates it as 'Hanyang,' where in 1996 it was reported that over 90% of the children who was abandoned in 1995 in Seoul had the bon of Hanyang. If the person discovers their birth father or mother after establishing a surname and a bon, they may adopt the surname and bon of that father or mother.

Parents can change an child's family name for the child's welfare. In this case, the parents must visit a family court to request permission to change the family name.

== List ==
Surname	Seal	English	Hangul	Hanja	Progenitor(s) (sijo)	Population in South Korea (2015)	Ref.
Kim		Gimhae Kim clan	김해 김씨	金海 金氏	Suro of Gaya	4,456,700	
Kim		Gyeongju Kim clan	경주 김씨	慶州 金氏	Kim Alchi	1,800,853	
Kim		Gwangsan Kim clan	광산 김씨	光山 金氏	Kim Hŭngkwang	926,316	
Kim		Andong Kim clan	안동 김씨	安東 金氏	Kim Suksŭng; Kim Sŏnp'yŏng	519,719	
Kim		Gimnyeong Kim clan	김녕 김씨	金寧 金氏	Kim Sihŭng	577,793	
Kim		Uiseong Kim clan	의성 김씨	義城 金氏	Kim Sŏk	287,469	
Kim		Gangneung Kim clan	강릉 김씨	江陵 金氏	Kim Chuwŏn	179,593	
Kim		Seonsan Kim clan	선산 김씨	善山 金氏	Kim Sŏnkung	138,819	
Kim		Cheongpoong Kim clan	청풍 김씨	淸風金氏	Kim Taeyu	110,815	
Kim		Yonan Kim clan	연안 김씨	延安 金氏	Kim Sŏmhan	93,382	
Kim		Samcheok Kim clan	삼척 김씨	三陟 金氏	Kim Ch'u	92,671	
Kim		Sangsan Kim clan	상산 김씨	商山 金氏	Kim Su	91,558	
Kim		Cheongdo Kim clan	청도 김씨	淸道 金氏	Kim Chitae	91,293	
Yi		Jeonju Yi clan	전주 이씨	全州 李氏	Yi Han	2,631,643	
Yi		Gyeongju Yi clan	경주 이씨	慶州 李氏	Alp'yŏng	1,391,867	
Yi		Seongju Yi clan	성주 이씨	星州 李氏	Yi Sunyu	203,703	
Yi		Gwangju Yi clan	광주 이씨	廣州 李氏	Yi Chasŏng	181,377	
Yi		Jeonui Yi clan	전의 이씨	全義 李氏	Yi To	164,189	
Yi		Yonan Yi clan	연안 이씨	延安 李氏	Yi Mu	164,036	
Yi		Hansan Yi clan	한산 이씨	韓山 李氏	Yi Yunkyŏng	156,861	
Yi		Hampyeong Yi clan	함평 이씨	咸平 李氏	Yi Ŏn	138,550	
Yi		Yeongcheon Yi clan	영천 이씨	寧川 李氏	Yi Munhan	135,612	
Yi		Hapcheon Yi clan	합천 이씨	陜川 李氏	Yi Kae	121,416	
Yi		Seongsan Yi clan	성산 이씨	星山 李氏	Yi Nŭngil	113,087	
Yi		Byeokjin Yi clan	벽진 이씨	碧珍 李氏	Yi Ch'ongŏn	109,267	
Yi		Deoksu Yi clan	덕수 이씨	德水 李氏	Yi Tonsu	58,513	
Park		Miryang Park clan	밀양 박씨	密陽 朴氏	Pak Ŏnch'im	3,103,942	
Park		Hamyang Park clan	함양 박씨	咸陽 朴氏	Pak Ŏnsin	163,610	
Park		Bannam Park clan	반남 박씨	潘南 朴氏	Pak Ŭngchu	160,964	
Park		Suncheon Park clan	순천 박씨	順天 朴氏	Pak Yŏngkyu	105,208	
Choi		Gyeongju Choi clan	경주 최씨	慶州 崔氏	Ch'oe Ch'i-wŏn	945,005	
Choi		Jeonju Choi clan (Note: Due to incomplete genealogy records, the Jeonju Choi clan does not identify a single unified progenitor. The four factions that constitute the clan each identify a different progenitor.)	전주 최씨	全州 崔氏	Ch'oe Sunchak; Ch'oe Kyun; Ch'oe Kunok; Ch'oe A	458,191	
Choi		Haeju Choi clan	해주 최씨	海州 崔氏	Ch'oe On	201,625	
Choi		Gangneung Choi clan	강릉 최씨	江陵 崔氏	Ch'oe Hŭnpong; Ch'oe P'iltal; Ch'oe Munhan	145,335	
Jung		Dongnae Jung clan	동래 정씨	東萊 鄭氏	Chŏng Hoemun	474,506	
Jung		Gyeongju Jung clan	경주 정씨	慶州 鄭氏	Chi Paekho	350,587	
Jung		Yeonil Jung clan	연일 정씨	延日 鄭氏	Chŏng Chongŭn	284,290	
Jung		Jinju Jung clan (Note: Historical records claim that the Jinju Jung lineage has descended from Chi Paekho. However, the clan has since split into four factions that identify with separate progenitors.)	진주 정씨	晉州 鄭氏	Chŏng Ye; Chŏng Chau; Chŏng Chang; Chŏng Hŏn	324,521	
Jung		Hadong Jung clan	하동 정씨	河東 鄭氏	Chŏng Tochŏng	187,152	
Jung		Chogye Jung clan	초계 정씨	草溪 鄭氏	Chŏng Paekŏl	104,155	
Jung		Haeju Jeong Clan	해주 정씨	海州 鄭氏	Chŏng Suk	45,101	
Kang		Jinju Kang clan	진주 강씨	晉州 姜氏	Kang I-sik	1,161,326	
Jo		Changnyeong Jo clan	창녕 조씨	昌寧 曺氏	Cho Kyeryong	366,798	
Jo		Hanyang Jo clan	한양 조씨	漢陽 趙氏	Cho Chisu	332,580	
Jo		Haman Jo clan	함안 조씨	咸安 趙氏	Cho Chŏng	282,890	
Jo		Pungyang Jo clan	풍양 조씨	豐壤 趙氏	Cho Maeng	124,262	
Yoon		Papyeong Yoon clan	파평 윤씨	坡平 尹氏	Yun Sintal	770,932	
Jang		Indong Jang clan	인동 장씨	仁同 張氏	Chang Kŭmyong	666,652	
Im		Naju Im clan	나주 임씨	羅州 林氏	Im Pi	277,699	
Im		Pyeongtaek Im clan	평택 임씨	平澤 林氏	Im P'alkŭp	225,872	
Im		Pungcheon Im clan	풍천 임씨	豊川 任氏	Im On	143,881	
Han		Cheongju Han clan	청주 한씨	淸州 韓氏	Han Ran	752,689	
Oh		Haeju Oh clan	해주 오씨	海州 吳氏	O Inyu	462,704	
Seo		Dalseong Seo clan	달성 서씨	達城 徐氏	Sŏ Chin	407,431	
Seo		Icheon Seo clan	이천 서씨	利川 徐氏	Sŏ Sinil	199,792	
Seo		Daegu Seo clan	대구 서씨	大丘 徐氏	Sŏ Han	97,866	
Shin		Pyeongsan Shin clan	평산 신씨	平山申氏	Sin Sung-gyŏm	563,375	
Shin		Goryeong Shin clan	고령 신씨	高靈 申氏	Sin Sŏngyong	129,718	
Shin		Yeongsan Shin clan	영산 신씨	靈山 辛氏	Sin Kyŏng	98,759	
Gwon		Andong Gwon clan	안동 권씨	安東 權氏	Kwŏn Haeng	696,317	
Hwang		Changwon Hwang clan	창원 황씨	昌原 黃氏		271,986	
Hwang		Jangsu Hwang clan	장수 황씨	長水 黃氏	Hwang Kyŏng	170,988	
Hwang		Pyeonghae Hwang clan	평해 황씨	平海 黃氏	Hwang Onin	168,374	
Ahn		Sunheung Ahn clan	순흥 안씨	順興 安氏	An Chami	520,384	
Song		Yeosan Song clan	여산 송씨	礪山 宋氏	Song Yuik	294,788	
Song		Eunjin Song clan	은진 송씨	恩津 宋氏	Song Taewŏn	226,050	
Jeon		Cheonan Jeon clan	천안 전씨	天安 全氏	Chŏn Sŏp; Chŏn Nak	176,239	
Jeon		Jeongseon Jeon clan	정선 전씨	旌善 全氏	Chŏn Sŏp; Chŏn Sŏn	166,965	
Jeon		Damyang Jeon clan	담양 전씨	潭陽 田氏	Chŏn Tŭksi	155,018	
Hong		Namyang Hong clan	남양 홍씨	南陽 洪氏	Hong Ch'ŏnha; Hong Sŏnhaeng	487,488	
Ko		Jeju Ko clan	제주 고씨	濟州 髙氏	Ko Ŭlna of Tamna	310,542	
Moon		Nampyeong Moon clan	남평 문씨	南平 文氏	Mun Tasŏng	445,946	
Yang		Namwon Yang clan	남원 양씨	南原 梁氏	Yang Uryang	307,724	
Yang		Jeju Yang clan	제주 양씨	濟州 梁氏	Yang Ŭlna	142,211	
Yang		Cheongju Yang clan	청주 양씨	淸州 楊氏	Yang Ki	38 161	
Son		Miryang Son clan	밀양 손씨	密陽 孫氏	Son Sun	306,895	
Son		Gyeongju Son clan	경주 손씨	慶州 孫氏	Son Sun	68,486	
Bae		Seongju Bae clan	성주 배씨	星州 裵氏	Pae Wichun	148,672	
Baek		Suwon Baek clan	수원 백씨	水原 白氏	Paek Ukyŏng	354,428	
Heo		Yangcheon Heo clan	양천 허씨	陽川 許氏	Hŏ Sŏnmun	149,505	
Nam		Yeongyang Nam clan	영양 남씨	英陽 南氏	Kim Ch'ung	82,272	
Gwak		Hyeonpung Gwak clan	현풍 곽씨	玄風 郭氏	Kwak Kyŏng	166,608	
Min		Yeoheung Min clan	여흥 민씨	驪興 閔氏	Min Ch'ingto	139,073	
Yoo		Munhwa Yoo clan	문화 류씨	文化 柳氏	Ryu Ch'atal	237,314	
Yoo		Jeonju Yoo clan	전주 류씨	全州 柳氏	Ryu Seup	78,690	
Yoo		Gangneung Yoo clan	강릉 유씨	江陵 劉氏	Yu Chŏn; Yu Sŭngpi	236,871	
Yoo		Gigye Yoo clan	기계 유씨	杞溪 兪氏	Yu Samchae	139,073	
Jin		Yeoyang Jin clan	여양 진씨	驪陽 陳氏	Chin Ch'onghu	110,403	
Mo		Hampyeong Mo clan	함평 모씨	咸平 牟氏	Mo Kyŏng	20,644	
Kyung		Cheongju Kyung Clan	청주 경씨	淸州 慶氏	Kyŏng Chin	12,474	
Bok		Myeoncheon Bok clan	면천 복씨	沔川 卜氏	Pok Chikyŏm	9,538	
Gyeon		Hwanggan Gyeon clan	황간 견씨	黃澗 甄氏	Ajagae	1,251	

== See also ==
- Ancestral home (Chinese)
- Chinese kin
- Korean clan names of foreign origin
- Korean name
- List of Korean surnames
- Place of origin
