= Yoo (Korean surname) =

- Yoo, Yu or Ryu
- Hangul: 유 or 류
- Hanja: 柳, 劉, 兪, 余, 庾
- Revised Romanization: Yu or Ryu
- McCune–Reischauer: Yu or Ryu

Yoo or Yu, or sometimes Ryu or Ryoo, is the English transcription of several Korean surnames written as 유 or 류 in hangul. As of 2000, roughly a million people are surnamed Yoo in South Korea, making up approximately 2% of the population. Of those, the most common is Ryu (Hanja: 柳, Hangul: 류), with more than six hundred thousand holders, whereas Yoo (Hanja: 兪, 余 Hangul: 유) accounts for about one hundred thousand.

The family name Yoo can be represented by any of the four hanja: 柳 (류), 劉, 兪 and 庾, each with a different meaning. In Korean, the characters 劉 and 柳 refer to 유 (Yoo) or 류 (Ryu) and are spelled as such because of the first initial sound rule (두음 법칙) in Korean, whereas the characters 兪 and 庾 refer only to 유 (Yoo). Some of these characters are used to write the Chinese surnames Liu (劉 or 柳) and Yu (兪，余).

Notable 柳 (Ryu) clans include the Munhwa Ryu clan and the Pungsan Ryu.

== History ==
In Korea, the Yoo lineage traces to the Xia, Han, and Joseon dynasties. Holders of the surname Yoo had a reputation for charity and diligence.

The largest Ryu (which is a separate clan from Yoo, but pronounced differently), the Munhwa Ryu, was founded by a man named Ch'a Tal. Ch'a's fifth great-grandfather had been involved in an attempt to overthrow the Silla king. To avoid prosecution, the ancestor fled to Munhwa and changed his surname, first to that of his maternal grandmother, Yang, and then to Ryoo. Many years later, Ch'a Tal assisted Wang Kŏn to establish the Koryŏ Kingdom. Ch'a was recognized for his support and was rewarded accordingly. However, the historic claims that the Ch'a clans are derived from the same progenitor as Ryu Ch'a-dal have been disproven. The Munhwa Ryoo clan, along with the Andong Kwŏn clan, possess one of Korea's oldest clan genealogies. Only the character 柳 is commonly pronounced Ryu or Ryoo (류). (See Munhwa Ryoo.) The surname "Ryu" comes from the character meaning willow tree. Hence, the lineage is also sometimes called "willow Ryu" (버들 류씨).

== Notable people (historic) ==
- Yu Ch'a-dal (880–?), founder of the Korean Munhwa Yu clan
- Queen Munhye, Goryeo princess
- Lady Daemyeong, member of the Goryeo royal family
- Yu Sŏngwŏn (?–1456), scholar-official of the early Joseon dynasty
- Yu Ŭngbu (?–1456), military official of the early Joseon dynasty
- Yu Sŏngnyong (1542–1607), scholar-official of the Joseon dynasty
- Grand Princess Consort Munhwa, Korean Royal Family member
- Yu Hyeong-won (1622–1673), Korean philosopher
- Yu Sang (1643–1723), royal court physician and politician of the Korean Joseon dynasty
- Yu Deuk-gong (1749–1807), Korean scholar during the Joseon dynasty
- Yu Kil-chun (1856–1914), Korean politician
- Yu Geun-Hyeong (1894–1993), Korean ceramist
- Ilhan New (1895–1971), Korean independence activist and entrepreneur
- Yu Gwan-sun (1902–1920), Korean independence activist

== Notable people (contemporary) ==
=== Arts and entertainment ===
- Aaron Yoo (born 1979), American actor
- Yoo Ara (born 1992), South Korean actress and singer, former member of girl group Hello Venus
- Yoo Byung-jae (born 1988), South Korean television personality, actor and screenwriter
- Yoo Chae-yeong (1973–2014), South Korean actress, singer and radio host
- Yoo Chan-wook (stage name Be'O, born 2000), South Korean rapper and songwriter
- Christine Yoo, American writer, director, producer and filmmaker
- Yoo Da-in (born 1984), South Korean actress
- Yoo Dong-geun (born 1956), South Korean actor
- Yoo Eun-mi (born 2004), South Korean actress
- Yoo Eun-sook, South Korean voice actor
- Yoo Gun-hyung (born 1979), South Korean record producer
- Yoo Ha-na (born 1986), South Korean actress
- Yoo Hae-jin (born 1970), South Korean actor
- Yoo Hae-jung (born 2000) South Korean actress
- Yoo Hee-jae (born 1994), South Korean singer and actor
- Yoo Ho-jeong (born 1969), South Korean actress
- Yoo Hwe-seung (born 1995), South Korean singer and musical theatre actor, member of rap rock band N.Flying
- Yoo Hye-ri (born 1964), South Korean actress
- Yoo Hyun-young (born 1976), South Korean entertainer
- Yoo In-na (born 1982), South Korean actress
- Yoo In-soo (born 1998), South Korean actor
- Yoo In-young (born 1984), South Korean actress
- Yoo Jae-ha (1962–1987), South Korean singer-songwriter
- Yoo Jae-suk (born 1972), South Korean comedian, host and television personality
- Yoo Jeong-yeon (born 1996), South Korean singer, member of girl group Twice
- Yoo Je-won, South Korean television director
- Yoo Je-yoon (born 1984), South Korean actor, model, and singer
- Jerome Yoo (born 1994), Korean-Canadian actor and filmmaker
- Ji-young Yoo (born 1999 or 2000), American actress
- Yoo Ji-ae (born 1993), South Korean singer and actress, member of girl group Lovelyz
- Yoo Ji-tae (born 1976), South Korean actor, film director and screenwriter
- Yoo Jun-sang (born 1969), South Korean actor and singer
- Yoo Jung-hoo (born 1997), South Korean actor
- Yoo Jung-hyun (born 1967), South Korean television personality and politician
- Yoo Kang-min (stage name Kangmin, born 2003), South Korean singer and actor, member of boy band Verivery
- Yoo Ki-hyun (born 1993), South Korean singer, member of boy band Monsta X
- Yoo Min-kyu (born 1987), South Korean actor
- Yoo Na-ul (stage name Naul, born 1978), South Korean singer
- Yoo Se-hyung (born 1992), South Korean actor
- Yoo Se-rye (born 1984), South Korean actress
- Yoo Se-yoon (born 1980), South Korean comedian and television comedy show host
- Yoo Seon-ho (born 2002), South Korean singer, actor and model
- Yoo Seung-ho (born 1993), South Korean actor
- Yoo Seung-jun (born 1976), South Korean-born American singer, rapper and actor
- Yoo Seung-woo (born 1997), South Korean musician
- Yoo Seung-yeon (stage name Gong Seung-yeon, born 1993), South Korean actress
- Yoo So-young (born 1986), South Korean actress
- Yoo Su-bin (born 1992), South Korean actor
- U Sung-eun (born Yoo Sung-eun, 1989), South Korean singer
- Yoo Yeon-joo (stage name YooA, born 1995), South Korean singer, member of girl group Oh My Girl
- Yoo Yeon-jung (born 1999), South Korean singer, member of girl group Cosmic Girls
- Yoo Yeon-mi (born 1999), South Korean actress
- Yoo Yeon-soo (stage name Ha Yeon-soo, born 1990), South Korean actress
- Yoo Young-jae (born 1994), South Korean singer and actor, member of boy band B.A.P
- Yoo Young-jin (born 1971), South Korean singer-songwriter and record producer
- You Hee-yeol (born 1971), South Korean singer-songwriter
- Yoo Seung-eon (born 2004), South Korean singer, member of And2ble, former member of Evnne
- Christian Yu (stage name DPR Ian, born 1990), Australian singer and rapper
- Yu Ji-min (stage name Karina, born 2000), South Korean singer, member of girl group Aespa
- Yu Ha-ram (stage name Yuha, born 2007), South Korean singer, member of girl group Hearts2Hearts
- Yu Oh-seong (born 1966), South Korean actor
- Ryoo Seung-bum (born 1980), South Korean actor
- Ryoo Seung-wan (born 1973), South Korean director
- Ryu Deok-hwan (born 1987), South Korean actor
- Ryu Han-bi (born 2004), South Korean actress
- Ryu Hwa-young (born 1993), South Korean actress and singer, former member of girl group T-ara
- Ryu Hye-rin (born 1984), South Korean actress and model
- Ryu Hye-young (born 1991), South Korean actress and model
- Ryu Hyo-young (born 1993), South Korean actress, model and rapper, former member of girl group F-ve Dolls
- Ryu Hyun-kyung (born 1983), South Korean actress
- Ryu Jun-yeol (born 1986), South Korean actor
- Ryu Kyung-soo (born 1992), South Korean actor
- Ryu Sang-gu (stage name Deepflow, born 1984), South Korean rapper and music producer
- Ryu Sa-rang (born 2007), South Korean singer and rapper, member of girl group Izna
- Ryu Se-ra (born 1987), South Korean singer, former member of girl group Nine Muses
- Ryu Seung-ryong (born 1970), South Korean actor
- Ryu Seung-soo (born 1971), South Korean actor
- Ryu Si-won (born 1972), South Korean actor and singer
- Ryu Soo-young (born 1979), South Korean actor
- Ryu Su-jeong (born 1997), South Korean singer, member of girl group Lovelyz
- Ryu Sung-min (stage name C Jamm, born 1993), South Korean rapper
- Ryu Tae-joon (born 1971), South Korean actor and singer
- Ryu Ui-hyun (born 1999), South Korean actor

==== Painters and sculptors ====
- Yoo Young-ho (born 1965), South Korean sculptor
- Yoo Youngkuk (1916–2002), South Korean artist

==== Musicians ====
- Esther Yoo (born 1994), American violinist
- Scott Yoo (born 1971), American conductor and violinist
- Yung Wook Yoo (born 1977), South Korean pianist

==== Authors, illustrators, novelists, poets ====
- Yoo An-jin (born 1941), South Korean poet, essayist, and professor
- David Yoo (born 1974), American writer
- Yoo Eun-Sil, South Korean author
- Yoo Hyeonjong, South Korean novelist
- Yoo Ja-hyo (born 1947), South Korean broadcaster and poet
- Yoo Jae-yong (1936–2009), South Korean novelist
- Yoo Juhyun (1921–1982), South Korean novelist
- Miri Yu (born 1968), Zainichi Korean playwright, novelist, and essayist
- Paula Yoo, American journalist, author and screenwriter
- Taeeun Yoo, South Korean picture book author and illustrator
- Yoo Yeong (1917–2002), South Korean literary scholar, translator, and poet

=== Athletes ===
- Yoo Byung-hoon (born 1972), South Korean paralympian athlete
- Yoo Byung-ok (born 1964), South Korean footballer
- Yoo Byung-soo (born 1988), South Korean footballer
- Yoo Chae-ran (born 1992), South Korean badminton player
- Yoo Chang-hyun (born 1985), South Korea footballer
- Yoo Dae-hyun (born 1990), South Korean footballer
- Yoo Dae-soon (born 1965), South Korean former footballer
- Daniel Yoo (born 1985), Korean-American former tennis player
- Yoo Dong-kwan (born 1963), South Korean former footballer
- Yoo Dong-min (born 1989), South Korean footballer
- Yoo Han-joon (born 1981), South Korean former outfielder
- Yoo Hee-kwan (born 1986), South Korean starting pitcher
- Yoo Ho-joon (born 1985), South Korean footballer
- Yoo Hong-youl (born 1983), South Korean footballer
- Yoo Hye-min (born 1981), South Korean alpine skier
- Yoo Hyeok-geun (born 1944), South Korean rower
- Yoo Hyeong-jong (born 1985), South Korean footballer
- Yoo Hyun (born 1984), South Korean footballer
- Yoo Hyun-goo (born 1983), South Korean footballer
- Yoo Hyun-ji (born 1984), South Korean handball player
- Yoo Jae-hoon (born 1984), South Korean former professional footballer
- Jeff Yoo (born 1978), South Korean former association football player
- Yoo Jin-sun (born 1962), South Korean former tennis player
- Yoo Ji-hoon (born 1988), South Korean footballer
- Yoo Ji-no (born 1989), South Korean footballer
- Yoo Jong-hyun (born 1988), South Korean footballer
- Yoo Joon-young (born 1990), South Korean footballer
- Yoo Jun-soo (born 1988), South Korean footballer
- Yoo Jung-nam (born 1983), South Korean swimmer
- Yoo Kee-heung (born 1947), South Korean football manager and former player
- Yoo Ki-hong (born 1988), South Korean former professional cyclist
- Yoo Kwang-joon (born 1932), South Korean former footballer
- Yoo Kyoung-youl (born 1978), South Korean former footballer
- Yoo Man-kee (born 1988), South Korean footballer
- Yoo Mi (born 1986), South Korean former tennis player
- Yoo Min-hyeon (born 1994), South Korean curler
- Yoo Nam-kyu (born 1968), South Korea former table tennis player
- Yoo Ok-ryul (born 1973), South Korean former gymnast
- Yoo Sang-chul (1971–2021), South Korean football manager and player
- Yoo Sang-hee, South Korean former female badminton player
- Yoo Sang-soo (born 1973), South Korean football coach and retired player
- Yoo Soo-hyun (born 1986), South Korean footballer
- Yoo Sun-hee (born 1967), South Korean female speed skater
- Yoo Sun-young (born 1986), South Korean professional golfer
- Yoo Sung-je (born 1985), South Korean ice hockey goaltender
- Yoo Sung-yeon (born 1976), South Korean former judoka
- Yoo Won-chul (born 1984), South Korean gymnast
- Yoo Won-jeong, South Korean paralympic boccia player
- Yoo Won-sang (born 1986), South Korean baseball player
- Yoo Yeon-seong (born 1986), South Korean professional badminton player
- Yoo Yeon-seung (born 1991), South Korean footballer
- Yoo Yong-sung (born 1974), South Korean retired badminton player
- Yoo Yoon-sik (born 1989), South Korean volleyball player
- You Young (born 2004), South Korean figure skater
- Yoo Young-a (born 1988), South Korean footballer
- Yoo Young-joo (born 1971), South Korean former basketball player
- Yoo Young-sil (born 1975), South Korean retired football player
- Yuh Jae-doo (born 1948), South Korean former professional boxer.
- Hyun-jin Ryu (born 1987), South Korean professional baseball player
- Ryu Jae-kuk (born 1983), South Korean professional baseball pitcher
- Ryu Ji-hye (born 1976), South Korean former table tennis player
- Ryu Seung-min (born 1982), South Korean professional table tennis player
- Ryu Seung-woo (born 1993), South Korean football player
- Ryu So-yeon (born 1990), South Korean professional golfer
- Yu Ki-sang (born 2001), South Korean basketballer

==== Other ====
- Yoo Chang-hyuk (born 1966), South Korean professional Go player
- Christopher Yoo (born 2006), American chess grandmaster
- Ryu Shikun (born 1971), South Korean professional Go player

==== Sports management ====
- Yoo Jae-hak (born 1963), South Korean basketball coach

=== Business ===
- Yoo Byung-eun (1941–2014), South Korean businessman, inventor, and photographer
- Yoo Jaehoon, South Korean businessman

=== Politics ===
- Yoo Chang-soon (1918–2010), South Korean politician
- Yoo Eun-hae (born 1962), South Korean politician
- Yoo Il-ho (born 1955), South Korean politician
- Yoo Jae-geon (1937–2022), South Korean politician
- Yoo Jin-ryong (born 1956), South Korean politician
- Yoo Jeong-bok (born 1957), South Korean public servant and politician
- John Yoo (born 1967), South Korean-born American legal scholar and former politician
- Yoo Jung-ju (born 1975), South Korean politician and animator
- Ryu Keun-chan (1949–2025), South Korean journalist and politician
- Yoo Myung-hee (born 1967), South Korean politician
- Yoo Nam-seok (born 1957), former President of the Constitutional Court of Korea
- Yoo Sang-yeol (1940–2022), South Korean public official
- Yoo Seong-min (born 1958), South Korean economist and politician
- Yoo Song-hwa (born 1968), South Korean politician
- Yu In-chon (born 1951), South Korean politician and actor
- Yu Sung-yup (1960–2025), South Korean politician
- Rhyu Si-min (born 1959), South Korean politician

==== Military ====
- Daniel Yoo (born 1962), Korean-American retired U.S. Marine Corps major general

=== Modeling and pageantry ===
- Jae Yoo (born 1989), South Korean model
- Yoo Ye-bin (born 1992), South Korean beauty pageant titleholder

=== Science and technology ===
- Christopher Yoo, academic
- Michelle Yoo, New Zealand academic
- Richard Yoo, American entrepreneur
- Ryoo Ryong (born 1955), South Korean scientist

=== Other ===
- Yoo Sang-joon, North Korean defector
- Ryu Seong-hyeon, North Korean defector
- Yoo Young-chul (born 1970), South Korean serial killer, sex offender, and cannibal

== See also ==
- Liu (surname)
- Rio (disambiguation)
- Ríos (disambiguation)
- Yu (Chinese name)
