= Consort Yu =

Consort Yu may refer to:

== Consorts with the surname Yu ==
=== China ===
- Consort Yu (Xiang Yu's wife) (died 202 BC), consort of Western Chu
- Beautiful Lady Yu (Han dynasty) (died 179), concubine of Emperor Shun of Han
- Yu Wenjun (297–328), wife of Emperor Ming of Jin
- Yu Daolian (died 366), wife of Emperor Fei of Jin
- Empress Yu (Northern Wei) (488?–507), wife of Emperor Xuanwu of Northern Wei
- Queen Yu (Wuyue) (fl. 970s), wife of Qian Chu
- Consort Yu (Yongle) (died 1421), concubine of the Yongle Emperor

=== Korea ===
- Several of Taejo of Goryeo's consorts
  - Queen Sinhye
  - Queen Sinmyeongsunseong
  - Queen Jeongdeok
  - Lady Dongyangwon
- Queen Munhye, wife of Great King Munwon
- Queen Heonui, wife of Gyeongjong of Goryeo
- Queen Mundeok (died before 997), wife of Seongjong of Goryeo
- Queen Seonjeong (Mokjong) (died c. 1009), wife of Mokjong of Goryeo
- Queen Wonyong (fl. 1013), consort of Hyeonjong of Goryeo
- Queen Myeongui (died 1112), wife of Sukjong of Goryeo
- Queen Anhye (died 1232), wife of Gojong of Goryeo
- Queen Wondeok (died 1239), consort of Gangjong of Goryeo
- Princess Gyeongchang (died after 1277), consort of Wonjong of Goryeo
- Deposed Queen Yu (1576–1623), wife of Gwanghaegun of Joseon
- Grand Princess Consort Munhwa (1598–1676), wife of Grand Prince Neungwon of Joseon

== Consorts with the title Consort Yu ==
- Imperial Noble Consort Chunque (c. 1690–1785), concubine of the Yongzheng Emperor
- Noble Consort Yu (Qianlong) (1714–1792), concubine of the Qianlong Emperor
- Consort Yu (Borjigin) (1730–1774), concubine of the Qianlong Emperor
- Concubine Yu (Daoguang) (1816–1897), concubine of the Daoguang Emperor
- Noble Consort Yu (Tongzhi) (1856–1932), concubine of the Tongzhi Emperor
