= Grand Prince Neungchang =

Korean prince (1599–1615)

Grand Prince Nŭngch'ang
- Duke Hyomin 효민공

Prince of Joseon
- Reign: 1612 – 4 May 1632
- Coronation: 1612
- Predecessor: Prince Neungwon

Grand Prince of Joseon (posthumously)
- Coronation: 4 May 1632
- Predecessor: Grand Prince Neungwon
- Born: Yi Jeon (이전; 李佺); 16 July 1599; His father's private house, Saemun-ri, Hanseong-bu, Joseon
- Died: 17 November 1615 (aged 16); Gyodong-gun, Ganghwa, Gyeonggi Province, Joseon
- Burial: "Grand Prince Neungchang Mausoleum", Chungung-dong, Hanam, Gyeonggi Province
- Spouse: Grand Princess Consort of the Neungseong Gu clan (m. 1615–1615)
- Issue: 1. Princess Yi Yeong-On; 2. Yi Yo, Prince Inpyeong (adopted)
- House: Yi
- Father: Wonjong of Joseon (biological); Prince Sinseong (adopted)
- Mother: Queen Inheon of the Neungseong Gu clan (biological); Princess Consort of the Pyeongsan Sin clan (adopted)

Korean name
- Hangul: 이전
- Hanja: 李佺
- RR: I Jeon
- MR: I Chŏn

Royal title
- Hangul: 능창대군
- Hanja: 綾昌大君
- RR: Neungchang daegun
- MR: Nŭngch'ang taegun

Posthumous name
- Hangul: 효민
- Hanja: 孝愍
- RR: Hyomin
- MR: Hyomin

Prince Nŭngch'ang (Korean: 능창군; Hanja: 綾昌君; 16 July 1599 – 17 November 1615), formally known as Grand Prince Nŭngch'ang (능창대군; 綾昌大君), and with the personal name Yi Jeon (이전; 李佺), was a Korean royal prince of the Joseon dynasty. He was the third son of Wonjong of Joseon and Queen Inheon of the Neungseong Gu clan. He was also the second younger brother of Injo of Joseon. Prince Nŭngch'ang was noted for his proficiency in equestrianism, martial arts, and particularly in archery.

== Biography ==
=== Early life ===
The future Grand Prince Nŭngch'ang was born on 16 July 1599 (the 32nd year of Seonjo of Joseon's reign) in Saemun-ri, Seongseo, Hanseong-bu, Joseon. He was the youngest son of Prince Jeongwon (정원군; 定遠君) and Princess Consort Yeonju of the Neungseong Gu clan (연주군부인; 連珠郡夫人), the daughter of Gu Sa-maeng (구사맹).

Although he was the biological son of Prince Jeongwon, he was later adopted by his second uncle, Prince Sinseong (신성군), who had no heirs. He was raised by his adoptive mother, Princess Consort Sin (군부인 신씨), the daughter of Sin Rip (신립). As a result, Sin Rip became his maternal grandfather, and Sin Gyeong-jin (신경진) and Sin Gyeong-hui (신경희) were regarded as his maternal uncles.

From a young age, Prince Nŭngch'ang was described as intelligent, talented, and of good appearance. He enjoyed reading and was nicknamed Hyeongongja (현공자; 賢公子, meaning "virtuous young master"). In 1601, at the age of three, he was granted the title Master Nŭngch'ang (능창수; 綾昌守). In 1612, at the age of fourteen, he was elevated to the title Prince Nŭngch'ang (능창군; 綾昌君).

=== During Gwanghaegun of Joseon's reign ===
During the reign of his half-uncle, Gwanghaegun of Joseon, rumours circulated that Prince Nŭngch'ang harboured ambitions for the throne and posed a threat to Gwanghaegun's rule. In 1608, following Gwanghaegun’s ascension to the throne and the death of Yu Yeong-gyeong (유영경) in prison, Prince Nŭngch'ang was granted the title of Jeongunwonjong gongsin, rank 1 (정운원종공신 1등). Later, in 1613 (the fifth year of Gwanghaegun's reign), after Prince Imhae (임해군) was imprisoned, he was awarded the title of Iksawonjong gongsin, rank 1 (익사원종공신 1등).

On 14 August 1615, there was speculation that Gwanghaegun intended to elevate him to the title of Grand Prince Nŭngch'ang (능창대군; 綾昌大君). However, on 22 August 1615, Gwanghaegun ordered his arrest. After questioning him at Injeongmun (인정문; 仁政門), the prince was imprisoned and subsequently exiled to Gyodong-do, Ganghwa.

=== Later life ===
On 17 November 1615 (the eighth year of Gwanghaegun of Joseon's reign), Prince Nŭngch'ang took his own life after writing a farewell letter to his parents, which he entrusted to his brother-in-law at a government office. However, the susaeng (수생) who received the letter was unable to deliver it immediately and instead concealed it in his sash, later burying it in the ground. In March 1623, following the rebellion and subsequent accession of his eldest brother, Grand Prince Neungyang (능양대군), the letter was finally delivered to him.

According to other records, on 19 November 1615 (the seventh year of Gwanghaegun's reign), Gwanghaegun exiled Prince Nŭngch'ang to Gyodong Island on charges of treason, where he was reportedly executed shortly after his arrival. Upon hearing of his death, their father, Wonjong, was said to have been overcome with grief. He fell ill and, after consuming alcohol while unwell, died on 2 February 1619 (the eleventh year of Gwanghaegun's reign) at the age of 40.

On 13 March 1623, Prince Nŭngch'ang's eldest brother, Prince Neungyang (능양군), led a coup that deposed Gwanghaegun and ascended the throne. During Injo's reign, Prince Nŭngch'ang, along with Gim Je-nam (김제남), Grand Prince Yeongchang (영창대군), and Yi Tae-gyeong, Prince Jilleung (이태경 진릉군), was posthumously reinstated.

Prince Nŭngch'ang was initially honoured with the posthumous title of Gadeokdaebu (가덕대부; 贈嘉德大夫). On 15 October 1629 (the seventh year of Injo’s reign), he was further elevated to Hyeollokdaebu (현록대부; 贈顯祿大夫).

In 1630, after his parents were posthumously granted the titles of Grand Internal Prince (대원군; 大院君; taewŏn'gun) and Grand Internal Princess Consort (부대부인; 府大夫人; pudaebuin), Prince Nŭngch'ang was elevated to the status of Grand Prince (대군; 大君; taegun) on 4 May 1632 (the tenth year of Injo's reign). His tombstone was subsequently inscribed with the title Grand Prince Nŭngch'ang (능창대군; 綾昌大君).

=== Aftermath and tomb ===
Prince Nŭngch'ang died on 17 November 1615, not long after his marriage to Lady Gu, the future Princess Consort Gu (군부인 구씨), in March 1615. Although she did not bear any children, he had one daughter with a concubine, Princess Yi Yeong-on (향주 이영온), who later married Hŏ Sŏ (허서), the third younger brother of Hŏ Mok.

He was initially buried in Gunjang-ri, Geumchon-myeon, Yangju-gun, Gyeonggi Province (later part of Geumgok-ri (Geumgok-dong, Namyangju), Migeum-myeon). On 29 October 1629, during the sixth year of Injo of Joseon's reign, his tomb was relocated to Nanji-won, Geuncheohyeok-dong, Namhansanseong Fortress, Godae-myeon, Gwangju-gun, Gyeonggi Province. It was later moved again to the mountain behind Gogol Gungan Village, Chungung-ri, Dongbu-myeon, Gwangju-gun, Gyeonggi Province.

On 13 May 1658, his adopted son, Grand Prince Inpyeong (인평대군), died and was buried on 13 July of the same year beside Nŭngch'ang's tomb. However, after 35 years, his remains were moved to Pocheon, Gyeonggi Province. To the left of Nŭngch'ang's tomb are the tombs of Yi Hyeok, Prince Uiwon (이혁 의원군) and his wife, while the tombs of Yi Yeon-Eung (이연응) and his wife are located below them.

Meanwhile, Nŭngch'ang's residence was confiscated by Gwanghaegun of Joseon and incorporated into Gyeongdeok Palace (경덕궁; 慶德宮). After his death, in March 1623, his elder brother Prince Neungyang (능양군) led a rebellion and ascended the throne as King Injo. Nŭngch'ang was posthumously reinstated on 15 March that same year and was initially honoured with the title Gadeokdaebu (가덕대부), later changed to Hyeollokdaebu (현록대부). King Injo designated his third son, Grand Prince Inpyeong (인평대군), as Nŭngch'ang's adoptive heir.

== Family ==
- Father
  - Biological: Wonjong of Joseon (조선 원종; 2 August 1580 – 29 December 1619)
  - Adoptive (biological uncle): Yi Hu, Prince Sinseong (이후 신성군; 6 January 1579 – 8 December 1592)
    - Grandfather: Seonjo of Joseon (조선 선조왕; 26 November 1552 – 16 March 1608)
    - Grandmother: Royal Noble Consort In of the Suwon Kim clan (인빈 김씨; 1555 – 10 December 1613)
- Mother
  - Biological: Queen Inheon of the Neungseong Gu clan (인헌왕후 구씨; 17 April 1578 – 14 January 1626)
  - Adoptive: Princess Consort Shin of the Pyeongsan Shin clan (군부인 평산 신씨; 1578 – 1622)
- Siblings
  - Older brother: Yi Jong, Grand Prince Neungyang (이종 능양대군; 7 December 1595 – 17 June 1649)
  - Older brother: Yi Bo, Grand Prince Neungwon (이보 능원대군; 15 May 1598 – 26 January 1656)
- Consorts and issue
  - Primary consort: Grand Princess Consort Gu of the Neungseong Gu clan (부부인 능성 구씨) — No issue.
    - Adoptive son: Yi Yo, Grand Prince Inpyeong (이요 인평대군; 10 January 1622 – 13 June 1658)
  - Unknown woman (a palace maid):
    - Daughter: Princess Yi Yeong-on (향주 이영온; 李英溫)

== Others ==
- In the family registers of Prince Namyeon (남연군), Prince Imperial Heung (흥친왕), and Prince Yeongseon (영선군) during the Japanese colonial period, both were recorded as descendants of Grand Prince Nŭngch'ang, listed as being from the seventh generation.
- Although Heo Mok (허목) personally built and inscribed the tombstones of his wife, in-laws, and daughter-in-law, his eldest daughter's tombstone does not contain detailed inscriptions about her life. It only records that she was married to Heo Seo (허서), Heo Mok's third younger brother.
- He shared the same title name as Yi Suk, Prince Nŭngch'ang (이숙 능창군; ? – 30 November 1768), who was the son of Yi Yeon, Prince Hwasan (이연 화산군) and grandson of Yi Geon, Prince Haewon (이건 해원군). Yi Suk was also the son of Yi Gong, Prince Inseong (이공 인성군), an illegitimate son of King Seonjo. Therefore, Prince Nŭngch'ang (Yi Suk) was also a descendant of Prince Nŭngch'ang (Yi Jeon).

== In popular culture ==
- Portrayed by Lee Seok-min in the 2003 SBS television series The King's Woman.
