= Grand Prince Neungwon =

Korean prince (1598–1656)

Grand Prince Nŭngwŏn

Prince of Joseon
- Reign: 1608 – 4 May 1623?
- Coronation: 1608
- Predecessor: Prince Nŭngp'ung
- Successor: Grand Prince Nŭngch'ang

Grand Prince of Joseon
- Reign: 4 May 1623 – 26 January 1656
- Coronation: 4 May 1623
- Predecessor: Grand Prince Nŭngyang
- Successor: Grand Prince Nŭngch'ang
- Born: 15 May 1598; Seongcheon, Pyeongan-do, Joseon
- Died: 26 January 1656 (aged 57); His sister in-law's manor, Yihyeon, Hanseong-bu, Yangju-si, Gyeonggi Province, Joseon
- Burial: "Grand Prince Neungwon Mausoleum", Nokchon-ri, Hwado-eup, Namyangju-si, Gyeonggi Province
- Spouse: Grand Princess Consort Munhwa of the Munhwa Yu clan Grand Princess Consort of the Yeongam Kim clan
- House: House of Yi
- Father: Wŏnjong (biological); Yi Sŏng, Prince Ŭian (adopted)
- Mother: Queen Inhŏn of the Neungseong Gu clan

Korean name
- Hangul: 이보
- Hanja: 李俌
- RR: I Bo
- MR: I Po

Royal title
- Hangul: 능원대군
- Hanja: 綾原大君
- RR: Neungwon daegun
- MR: Nŭngwŏn taegun

Art name
- Hangul: 담은당
- Hanja: 湛恩堂
- RR: Dameundang
- MR: Tamŭndang

Courtesy name
- Hangul: 경숙
- Hanja: 敬叔
- RR: Gyeongsuk
- MR: Kyŏngsuk

Posthumous name
- Hangul: 정효
- Hanja: 貞孝
- RR: Jeonghyo
- MR: Chŏnghyo

Grand Prince Nŭngwŏn (Korean: 능원대군; Hanja: 綾原大君; 15 May 1598 – 26 January 1656 (Note: In the Korean calendar (lunar), he was born on 11 April 1598 and died on 1 January 1656.)), personal name Yi Po (이보; 李俌) was a Korean politician of the late Joseon period. He was also a Korean Royal Prince as the second son of Wonjong of Joseon and Queen Inheon of the Neungseong Ku clan. He was the younger brother of Injo of Joseon.

== Biography ==
=== Early life ===
The future Grand Prince Nŭngwŏn was born on 15 May 1598 (31st year reign of Seonjo of Joseon) in Seongcheon, Pyeongan-do, Joseon as the second son of Prince Jeongwon (정원군; 定遠君) and Princess Consort Yeonju of the Neungseong Ku clan (연주군부인; 連珠郡夫人) during the late Imjin War period. Since child, he was spent a brief childhood in Pyeongyang-si, Pyeongan-do and grew up in his father's private residence in Hanseong-bu.

Meanwhile, later in 1608 (41st year reign of his grandfather, Seonjo of Joseon), at 11 years old, Bo was adopted as his 1st uncle, Prince Ŭian (의안군)'s son. However, Prince Ŭian at 12 years old and later, in 1601, Bo was given royal title Master Nŭngwŏn (능원수; 綾原守) at first and later changed into Prince Nŭngwŏn (능원군) in 1608.

=== During Gwanghaegun of Joseon's reign ===
In 1608 (Gwanghaegun's ascension to the throne), immediately after Yu Yŏnggyŏng's (유영경) death in prison, the prince become of Jeongunwonjonggongsin rank 1 (정운원종공신 1등). Later, in 1613 (5th year reign of Gwanghaegun), after Prince Imhae was imprisoned, he became Iksawonjonggongsin rank 1 (익사원종공신 1등). However, 4 years later in 1617 (10th year reign of Gwanghaegun), he was participated in the discussion on the abolition of Dowager Queen Inmok as the senior person in the palace. Other bureaucrats whom participated in these discussion were punished, but he wasn't got punished.

=== During Injo of Joseon's reign ===
Later, on 13 March 1623, his big brother, Prince Nŭngyang make a rebellion and then ascended the throne. However, when their youngest brother, Grand Prince Nŭngch'ang was exiled to Gyo-dong on charges of treason in 1615 (7th year reign of Gwanghaegun of Joseon), he was immediately killed and died in there. Heard if the youngest brother was death, their father, Wonjong was so heartbroken over this and while drinking the alcohol, he died on 2 February 1619 (11st year reign of Gwanghaegun of Joseon) at 40 years old.

Then, on 22 December in the same year, Nŭngwŏn became an officer in Sodeokdaebu (소덕대부). However, in March 1625 (Injo's 3rd year reign), a man named Chŏng Yŏngsin (정영신), the servant of Nŭngwŏn's adopted father was beaten and got killed.

At this time, there were some ministers accused him, but Injo only believed the words of the servants who betrayed him and didn't conducted the investigation fairly, instead ordered the ministers to left. Afterwards, both of Yun Sunji (윤순지) and Kim Yu (김유) were filed an appeal for fear that the state's words would be blocked and Injo then apologized for being too excessive.

However, on 28 November 1625 (Injo's 3rd year reign), when his mother, Lady Kyeun (계운궁; 啓運宮) became critically ill, Injo specially offered Hyŏlloktaebu (현록대부) to Nŭngwŏn in order to comfort his biological mother. Later, when their mother died on 10 February 1626, Nŭngwŏn become the resident instead of Injo. Numerous ministers argued that Nŭngwŏn, who had already been adopted by Prince Ŭian, couldn't be Lady Kyeun resident, but Injo didn't grant permission and refused it. After that, Nŭngwŏn must faced a difficult life because he was being dismissed from the office and must divorced from his wife, Lady Yu (유씨) because her father was failed in conspiracy to make Prince Inseong (인성군), the first son of Seonjo of Joseon and Royal Noble Consort Jeong of the Yeoheung Min clan as the new King to succeed Gwanghae in the throne, so King Injo demanded him to divorced from her. At first, he refused this, but later removed her title and demoted to just be his concubine (첩; 妾). Although that, she can still able to lived in his home.

Meanwhile, when Injo concerned about his small house, Injo fell wrong with this and gave him a special palace in Yihyeon (이현; 梨峴), Hanseong-bu as his house. Later, on 17 September 1628 (Injo's 5th year reign), Nŭngwŏn became Somuwonjonggongsin rank 1 (소무원종공신 1등).

=== After military service and ranks ===
Later, after Injo's ascension to the throne, their father was honoured as King Wonjong (원종왕; 元宗王) and their mother was honoured as Queen Inheon (인헌왕후; 仁獻王后). Then, on 4 May 1623 (Injo's 10th year reign), he was honoured as Grand Prince Nŭngwŏn (능원대군; 綾原大君) along with his younger brother who died as Grand Prince Nŭngch'ang (Korean: 능창대군; Hanja: 綾昌大君). In 1645 (Injo's 23rd year reign), he received a portion of the envoys from Dorgon (도르곤) who was the Prince regent of Qing dynasty.

Later, in September 1646 (24th year reign of Injo of Joseon), after Sim Kiwŏn (심기원)'s rebellion case was ended, Nŭngwŏn became Yeonggukgongsin (영국공신; 寧國功臣) and then Yeonggukwonjonggongsin (영국원종공신; 寧國元從功臣) in September 1646 (Injo's 24th year reign).

=== Faction ===
Famous figures of his faction (능원대군파) were such as the politician Yi Chinyong (이진용) and the playwright Yi Haerang (연극인 이해랑). Meanwhile, since the Prince was adopted by his 1st uncle, his faction was sometimes called as Prince Ŭian Faction (의안군파).

=== Died and later life ===
He later died on 26 January 1656 (7th year reign of his nephew, Hyojong of Joseon) at 57 years old and received his posthumous name, then, was buried in Nokchon-ri, Hwado-eup, Namyangju, Gyeonggi Province along with his wife. On the other hand, it was said that he also claimed the theory of ch'ŏkhwa (척화) together with Kim Sanghŏn (김상헌), who was a presiding officer at the time, despite the growing public opinion insisting on strengthening the Qing dynasty.

He was also ignorant of Buddhism and didn't even look the cause, but after his 1st father in-law, Yu Hyorip (유효립) was punished and exiled, he faced his wife, wept and complained about this. It was said that he lived together as before without any regrets.

== Family ==
Grand Prince Nŭngwŏn had 20 grandchildren and 45 middle-grandsons, almost of them were lived with prospering. His Sindo (신도) was written by Song Siyeol (송시열) and Jo Sa-U (조사우).

- Father:
  - Biological - Wonjong of Joseon (조선 원종; 2 August 1580 – 29 December 1619)
  - Adopted (Uncle) - Yi Sŏng, Prince Ŭian (이성 의안군; 1577 – 20 March 1588)
    - Grandfather - Seonjo of Joseon (조선 선조왕; 26 November 1552 – 16 March 1608)
    - Grandmother - Royal Noble Consort In of the Suwon Kim clan (인빈 김씨; 1555 – 10 December 1613)
- Mother - Queen Inheon of the Neungseong Ku clan (인헌왕후 구씨; 17 April 1578 – 14 January 1626)
  - Grandfather - Ku Samaeng, Duke Munŭi, Internal Prince Nŭngan (구사맹 문의공 능안부원군; 1531 – 1 April 1604)
  - Grandmother - Internal Princess Consort P'yŏngsan of the Pyeongsan Sin clan (평산부부인 평산 신씨; 1538–1562)

Sibling(s):

- Older brother - Yi Chong, Grand Prince Nŭngyang (이종 능양대군; 7 December 1595 – 17 June 1649)
- Younger brother - Yi Chŏn, Grand Prince Nŭngch'ang (이전 능창대군; 16 July 1599 – 17 November 1615)
- Consorts and their Respective Issue(s):
1. Grand Princess Consort Munhwa of the Munhwa Ryu clan (문화부부인 문화 류씨; 27 October 1598 – 3 August 1676)
2. Grand Princess Consort of the Yeongam Kim clan (부부인 영암 김씨; 9 March 1610 – 25 January 1696)
  1. Yi Sik, Prince Yŏngp'ung (이식 영풍군; ?–1692)
  2. Yi Ham, Prince Yŏngŭn (이함 영은군)
  3. Yi Hyŏng, Prince Yŏngsin (이형 영신군)
  4. Yi Chŏng, Prince Yŏngch'un (이정 영춘군)
  5. Yi Yu (이유)
  6. Lady Yi (이씨)
  7. Lady Yi Yŏngjŏng (이영정; 李英淨; 1639–1657)
  8. Lady Yi (이씨)

== Legacy ==
- His tomb designated as Gyeonggi Province Cultural Heritage Material No. 115 on 16 September 2002 by the Cultural Heritage Administration of the Republic of Korea.
