= Deposed Crown Princess Park =

Crown Princess of Joseon (1598–1623)

Crown Princess of Joseon
- Tenure: 1611 – 13 April 1623
- Predecessor: Crown Princess Yu
- Successor: Crown Princess Kang
- Born: 1598; Hanseong, Joseon
- Died: 19 June 1623 (aged 24–25); Ganghwa Island, Joseon
- Spouse: Crown Prince Ji (m. 1611)
- Issue Detail: 1 daughter
- Clan: Miryang Park (by birth); Jeonju Yi (by marriage)
- Dynasty: Yi
- Father: Park Ja-heung
- Mother: Lady, of the Gwangju Yi clan

Korean name
- Hangul: 폐빈 박씨
- Hanja: 廢嬪 朴氏
- RR: Pyebin Bakssi
- MR: P'yebin Pakssi

Deposed Crown Princess Park (Korean: 폐빈 박씨; Hanja: 廢嬪 朴氏; 1598 (Note: In the Korean calendar (lunisolar), she was born in the 3rd lunar month.) – 19 June 1623), of the Miryang Park clan, was the wife of Yi Ji, the only surviving son of Gwanghaegun. She lost her position as crown princess when her father-in-law was dethroned in a coup d'état.

== Biography ==
=== Early life and lineage ===
Lady Park was born during the reign of King Seonjo. Her father was Park Ja-heung (박자흥) and her mother was a lady from the prestigious Gwangju Yi clan (광주 이씨).

=== Marriage ===
In 1611, at the age of 13, Lady Park married 12-year-old Yi Ji, the only son and heir of Gwanghaegun, and was invested as crown princess. In 1614, she gave birth to her first and only child, a daughter who would die a few months later.

=== Downfall and death ===
In 1623, Gwanghaegun was dethroned in a coup d'état orchestrated by the Westerners and the throne passed to Yi Ji's first cousin, Prince Neungyang (posthumously King Injo). Lady Park lost her position and was exiled to Ganghwa Island alongside her husband and parents-in-law. Following the coup, her father and paternal grandfather commited suicide, whereas her maternal grandfather, the powerful official Yi I-cheom (이이첨), and maternal uncles were beheaded.

Yi Ji began digging a tunnel soon after arriving at their place of exile, but the escape attempt was foiled and he was sentenced to death one month later. Meanwhile, Lady Park commited suicide three days after her husband's arrest. She was 25 years old. The location of her tomb remains unknown.

== Titles ==
- During the reign of King Seonjo (r. 1567–1608):
  - Lady, of the Miryang Park clan (밀양 박씨; 密陽朴氏; from 1598)
    - Park Ja-heung's daughter (박자흥의 딸)
    - Lady Park (박씨; 朴氏)
- During the reign of Gwanghaegun (r. 1608–1623):
  - Crown Princess (왕세제빈; 王世弟嬪; from 1511)
- During the reign of King Injo (r. 1623–1649):
  - Commoner (서인; 庶人; from 1623)

== Family ==
- Father: Park Ja-heung (박자흥; 1581–1623)
- Mother: Lady, of the Gwangju Yi clan (광주 이씨)
- Husband: Yi Ji (이지), Deposed Crown Prince (폐세자; 31 December 1598 – 22 July 1623)
  - Father-in-law: Gwanghaegun (광해군; 14 June 1575 – 7 August 1641)
  - Mother-in-law: Queen (왕비), of the Munhwa Yu clan (문화 유씨; 25 August 1576 – 21 October 1623)
- Issue
  - Unnamed daughter (1614)

== Ancestry ==
Ancestors of Deposed Crown Princess Park

Park Gye-hyeon (박계현)
Park An-se (박안세)
Park Seung-jong (박승종)
Hwang Rim (황림)
Lady, of the Changwon Hwang clan (창원 황씨)
Park Ja-heung (박자흥)
Kim Yeo-myeong (김여명)
Kim Sa-won (김사원)
Lady, of the Namwon Yang clan (남원 양씨)
Lady, of the Cheongpung Kim clan (청풍 김씨)
Deposed Crown Princess Park
Yi Beom (이범)
Yi U-seon (이우선)
Yi I-cheom (이이첨)
Ryu Yu-il (류유일)
Lady, of the Jinju Ryu clan (진주 류씨)
Lady, of the Gwangju Yi clan (광주 이씨)
Yi Geuk-yu (이극유)
Lady, of the Jeonju Yi clan (전주 이씨)

== See also ==
- History of Korea
- Styles and titles in Joseon
