= Deposed Crown Prince Yi Ji =

Crown Prince of Joseon (1598–1623)

Crown Prince of Joseon
- Tenure: 5 May 1608 – 13 April 1623
- Investiture: Injeongjeon, Changdeokgung
- Predecessor: Crown Prince Hon
- Successor: Crown Prince Wang
- Born: Yi Su (이수; 李修); 31 December 1598; Hanseong, Joseon
- Died: 22 July 1623 (aged 24); Ganghwa Island, Gyeonggi Province, Joseon
- Burial: Namyangju, South Korea
- Spouse: Crown Princess Park (m. 1611; died 1623)
- Issue Detail: 3 daughters
Names
- Yi Ji (이지; 李祬)
- Clan: Jeonju Yi
- Dynasty: Yi
- Father: Gwanghaegun
- Mother: Queen Yu
- Religion: Confucianism (Neo-Confucianism)

Korean name
- Hangul: 폐세자 이지
- Hanja: 廢世子 李祬
- RR: Pyeseja I Ji
- MR: P'yeseja I Chi

Yi Ji (Korean: 이지; Hanja: 李祬; 31 December 1598 – 22 July 1623), (Note: In the Korean calendar (lunisolar), he was born on the 4th day of the 12th lunar month and died on the 25th day of the 6th lunar month.) firstly named Yi Su, was the only surviving son of Gwanghaegun, the 15th monarch of Joseon. He was invested as crown prince shortly after his father's accession to the throne, then lost his position when his father was dethroned in a coup d'état led by his first cousin, Prince Neungyang (King Injo).

== Biography ==
Yi Ji was born on 31 December 1598 as the second, or perhaps third son, of Crown Prince Hon and Crown Princess Yu of the Munhwa Yu clan, during the reign of his grandfather, King Seonjo. He became the prince royal (원자) upon his father's accession to the throne and was then invested as crown prince.

In 1611, a royal bridal selection was held and Yi Ji married Lady Park, the 13-year-old daughter of Park Ja-heung (박자흥). In 1618, Heo Gyun's daughter became his consort.

On 13 April 1623, Yi Ji's father was deposed and exiled alongside his family to Ganghwa Island. While in exile, Yi Ji attempted to dig a tunnel and escape, but was captured by the guarding soldiers. Lady Park committed suicide three days after her husband's arrest. One month after his wife's death, Yi Ji was ordered to commit suicide and hanged himself.

King Injo had the funeral conducted according to the rites for a deposed consort. Yi Ji was buried near Heunguksa Temple (흥국사) on Suraksan, in Namyangju, Gyeonggi Province.

== Family ==
- Father: Gwanghaegun (광해군; 14 June 1575 – 7 August 1641)
  - Grandfather: King Seonjo (선조대왕; 6 December 1552 – 16 March 1608)
  - Biological grandmother: Concubine Gong (공빈), of the Gimhae Kim clan (김해 김씨; 26 November 1553 – 23 June 1577)
  - Adoptive grandmother: Queen Uiin (의인왕후), of the Bannam Park clan (반남 박씨; 15 May 1555 – 26 July 1600)
  - Step-grandmother: Queen Inmok (인목왕후), of the Yonan Kim clan (연안 김씨; 15 December 1584 – 13 August 1632)
- Mother: Queen (왕비), of the Munhwa Yu clan (문화 유씨; 25 August 1576 – 21 October 1623)
  - Grandfather: Yu Ja-sin (유자신), Internal Prince Munyang (문양부원군; 1541–1612)
  - Grandmother: Internal Princess Consort Bongwon (봉원부부인), of the Dongnae Jeong clan (동래 정씨; 1541–1620)

Consort(s) and their respective issue

- Crown Princess (왕세자빈), of the Miryang Park clan (밀양 박씨; 1598 – 19 June 1623)
  - Unnamed daughter (1614)
- Sohun (소훈), of the Yangcheon Heo clan (양천 허씨)
- Lady, of the Yi clan (이씨)
  - Unnamed daughter (1620–?)
- Unknown
  - Unnamed daughter (1618–?)

== Ancestry ==
Ancestors of Deposed Crown Prince Yi Ji

King Jungjong (중종대왕)
Grand Internal Prince Deokheung (덕흥대원군)
Concubine Chang, of the Ansan An clan (창빈 안산 안씨)
King Seonjo (선조대왕)
Jeong Se-ho (정세호) (Note: Grandson of Jeong In-ji.)
Grand Internal Princess Consort Hadong, of the Hadong Jeong clan (하동부대부인 하동 정씨)
Lady, of the Gwangju Yi clan (광주 이씨)
Gwanghaegun (광해군)
Kim Jong-su (김종수)
Kim Hui-cheol (김희철)
Lady, of the Hadong Jeong clan (하동 정씨)
Concubine Gong, of the Gimhae Kim clan (공빈 김해 김씨)
Gwon Jang (권장)
Lady, of the Andong Gwon clan (안동 권씨)
Lady, of the Gimhae Heo clan (김해 허씨)
Yi Ji
Yu Su-cheon (유수천)
Yu Jam (유잠)
Yu Ja-sin, Internal Prince Munyang (문양부원군 유자신)
Jeong Seung-yeom (정승염)
Lady, of the Hadong Jeong clan (하동 정씨)
Queen, of the Munhwa Yu clan (왕비 문화 유씨)
Jeong Bok-gyeom (정복겸)
Jeong Yu-gil (정유길)
Lady, of the Yi clan (이씨)
Internal Princess Consort Bongwon, of the Dongnae Jeong clan (봉원부부인 동래 정씨)
Won Gye-chae (원계채)
Lady, of the Wonju Won clan (원주 원씨)
Lady, of the Jeonju Yi clan (전주 이씨)

== In popular culture ==
- Portrayed by Jung Tae-woo in the 2003 SBS TV series The King's Woman.
- Portrayed by Choi Seung-hun in the 2014 KBS2 TV series The King's Face.
- Portrayed by Lee Ha-yool in the 2015 MBC TV series Splendid Politics.
- Portrayed by Lee Min-jae in the 2021 MBN TV series Bossam: Steal the Fate.

== See also ==
- History of Korea
- Styles and titles in Joseon
- Politics of Joseon
