= Empress Yu =

Empress Yu may refer to:

- Yu Wenjun (297–328), empress of the Jin dynasty, wife of Sima Shao (Emperor Ming)
- Yu Daolian (died 366), empress of the Jin dynasty, wife of Sima Yi (Emperor Fei)
- Empress Yu (Northern Wei) (488?–507), empress of the Northern Wei dynasty

== See also ==
- Queen Yu (disambiguation)
