= Grand Princess Consort Munhwa =

Korean princess (1598–1676)

- Hangul: 문화부부인
- Hanja: 文化府夫人
- RR: Munhwa bubuin
- MR: Munhwa pubuin

Princess Consort Munhwa of the Munhwa Yu clan (Korean: 문화부부인 문화 유씨; Hanja: 文化府夫人 文化 柳氏; 27 October 1598 – 3 August 1676) was a Korean Royal Family member though her marriage as the first wife of Grand Prince Neungwon, the second son of Wonjong of Joseon and Queen Inheon. Lady Yu was the daughter of Yu Hyo-rib (유효립).

== Biography ==
=== Early life ===
Lady Yu was born on 27 October 1598 into the Munhwa Yu clan to Yu Hyo-rib and his unnamed wife during King Seonjo's reign.

Her father was the son of Yu Hui-gyeon (유희견), the older brother of Yu Hui-bun (유희분) who was also the nephew of Yu Ja-shin (유자신). Yu Ja-shin was the father of Deposed Queen Yu and the father in-law of Gwanghaegun of Joseon.

=== Marriage ===
She later married with Prince Jeongwon's 3rd son, Yi Bo, Prince Neungwon (이보 능원군). She later bore him several children but some died soon after birth or in early adulthood. However, in 1628, her father was executed in Ok-sa (옥사) after conspiracy to make Prince Inseong (인성군), the first son of Seonjo of Joseon and Royal Noble Consort Jeong of the Yeoheung Min clan as the new King to succeeded Gwanghae in the throne, so King Injo demanded his little brother, Grand Prince Neungwon divorce her.

At first, he refused this, but later removed her from her title and demoted to just be his concubine (첩; 妾), also she couldn't bore him any child. Although that, she can still able to lived in his home. Even her husband often asked for her resignation, Injo refused to listen on him and saying that he couldn't have her as his primary wife because of her father's problems and conspirasies.

=== Later life ===
She lived more long than her husband whom died in 1565 and was allowed to remain at her husband's sister in-law's home in Yihyeon, Hanseong-bu, Yangju, Gyeonggi Province. Later, after his death, she was reinstated in 1699 (25th year reign of Sukjong of Joseon) and after her death on 3 August 1676, she was buried along with her husband in Grand Prince Neungwon Mausoleum. She died at 78 years old.

Then, both of Prince Yeongpung (영풍군) and Prince Geumcheon (금천군) complained about her resentment but later honoured her as Princess Consort Yu (Korean: 군부인 유씨).

== Family ==
- Father
  - Yu Hyo-rib (유효립; 柳孝立; 1579–1628)
- Mother
  - Lady Jeong of the Naju Jeong clan (나주 정씨; 羅州 丁氏; 1579–?)
- Sibling(s)
  - Younger sister - Lady Yu of the Munhwa Yu clan (문화 류씨; 文化 柳氏; 1603–?)
  - Younger sister - Lady Yu of the Munhwa Yu clan (문화 류씨; 文化 柳氏; 1608–?); married in 1627, Kim Ik-gyeon's first wife
- Husband
  - Yi Bo, Grand Prince Neungwon (이보 능원대군; 15 May 1598 – 26 January 1656)
    - Father-in-law - King Wonjong (조선 원종; 2 August 1580 – 2 February 1620)
    - Mother-in-law - Queen Inheon of the Neungseong Gu clan (인헌왕후 구씨; 23 May 1578 – 10 February 1626)
- Issue
  - Son - Yi Sik (이식; 李식; 29 August 1630–?)
  - Son - Yi Ham (이함; 李涵; 8 April 1633 – 1700)
  - Son - Yi Hyeong (이형; 李瀅; 22 October 1635–?)
  - Son - Yi Yeong-jeong (이영정; 李英淨; 1645)
  - Daughter - Lady Yi (이씨; 1647)
  - Daughter - Lady Yi (이씨; 1649)
