= Deposed Queen Yu =

Queen of Joseon from 1608 to 1623

Queen Consort of Joseon
- Tenure: 16 March 1608 – 13 April 1623
- Predecessor: Queen Inmok
- Successor: Queen Inyeol

Crown Princess of Joseon
- Tenure: 8 June 1592 – 16 March 1608
- Predecessor: Crown Princess Yun
- Successor: Crown Princess Park
- Born: 25 August 1576; Hanseong, Joseon
- Died: 21 October 1623 (aged 47); Ganghwa Island, Gyeonggi Province, Joseon
- Burial: Gwanghaegunmyo, Namyangju, South Korea
- Spouse: Gwanghaegun (m. 1587)
- Issue Detail: 3 sons (Note: And 1 child of uncertain gender.)
Regnal name
- Jangryeol Gyeonghwi Jeongseong Myeongsuk Hyeonsin Jeongsun (장렬경휘정성명숙현신정순;章烈敬徽貞聖明淑顯愼貞順) (Note: Known as honorific name (존호; 尊號) in the Sinosphere, its closest equivalent in the English-speaking world is the regnal name.)
- Clan: Munhwa Yu (by birth); Jeonju Yi (by marriage)
- Dynasty: Yi
- Father: Yu Ja-shin, Internal Prince Munyang
- Mother: Internal Princess Consort Bongwon, of the Dongnae Jeong clan
- Religion: Buddhism

Korean name
- Hangul: 폐비 유씨
- Hanja: 廢妃 柳氏
- RR: Pyebi Yussi
- MR: P'yebi Yussi

Deposed Queen Yu (Korean: 폐비 유씨; Hanja: 廢妃 柳氏; 25 August 1576 – 21 October 1623), of the Munhwa Yu clan, also known as Princess Consort Munseong, was the wife of Gwanghaegun, the 15th monarch of Joseon. She was queen of Joseon from 1608 until her husband's dethronement in 1623.

== Biography ==
=== Early life and lineage ===
Lady Yu was born during the reign of King Seonjo, as the eight child and third daughter among six sons and four daughters. Her father was Yu Ja-shin (유자신) and her mother was a lady from the Dongnae Jeong clan (동래 정씨).

Both of her parents were descendants of King Jeongjong; her father was a great-great-great-grandson of his fourth son, Prince Seonseong (선성군), whereas her mother was a great-great-granddaughter of his 14th son, Prince Jeongseok (정석군). Via her paternal grandmother, Lady Yu was also a great-great-great-granddaughter of Jeong In-ji and a second cousin of Grand Internal Princess Consort Hadong, and via her maternal grandfather, Jeong Yu-gil (정유길), she was a second cousin once removed of Queen Inseon.

=== Marriage ===
In 1587, at the age of 11, Lady Yu married 12-year-old Yi Hon (later known as Gwanghaegun/Prince Gwanghae), the second son of King Seonjo by Concubine Gong. When the Imjin War broke out in 1592, her husband was named crown prince and as his legitimate wife, she became crown princess.

During the invasion, Lady Yu fled to Uiju while heavily pregnant, but there are no extant documents recording the infant's gender. In 1596, she gave birth to a son who died shortly after, followed by her only surviving child, Yi Ji, in 1598. A third son was born in 1601, but he also died in infancy due to smallpox.

Gwanghaegun succeeded King Seonjo in 1608 and Lady Yu thus became queen.

=== Husband's dethronement ===
In 1623, Prince Neungyang (posthumously King Injo) launched a coup d'état with the support of the Westerners and Gwanghaegun was dethroned. Lady Yu lost her position as queen and reverted to her previous title, Princess Consort Munseong (문성군부인). She was then exiled to Ganghwa Island alongside Gwanghaegun and their son and his family, but soon after arriving at their place of exile, a failed escape attempt resulted in Yi Ji's death sentence.

=== Death ===
By 1618, Lady Yu's health had already begun to deteriorate and she died six months after the coup d'état, at the age of 47. She was buried in present-day Namyangju, Gyeonggi Province. Gwanghaegun, who survived her by 17 years, was originally buried in his second place of exile on Jeju Island, but his tomb was relocated to the vicinity of that of Lady Yu in 1643. The site is known as Gwanghaegunmyo (광해군묘).

== Titles ==
- During the reign of King Seonjo (r. 1567–1608):
  - Lady, of the Munhwa Yu clan (문화 유씨; 文化柳氏; from 25 August 1576)
    - Daughter of Yu Ja-shin (유자신의 딸)
    - Lady Yu (유씨; 柳氏)
  - Princess Consort Munseong (문성군부인; 文城郡夫人; from 1587)
  - Crown Princess (왕세제빈; 王世弟嬪; from 8 June 1592)
- During the reign of Gwanghaegun (r. 1608–1623):
  - Queen (왕비; 王妃; from 16 March 1608)
- During the reign of King Injo (r. 1623–1649):
  - Princess Consort Munseong (문성군부인; 文城郡夫人; from 1623)

== Family ==
- Father: Yu Ja-shin (유자신), Internal Prince Wonyang (문양부원군; 1541–1612)
- Mother: Internal Princess Consort Bongwon (봉원부부인), of the Dongnae Jeong clan (동래 정씨; 1541–1620); given name Yang-jeong (정양정)
- Sibling(s)
  - Yu Hui-gaeng (유희갱; 1561–?) (Note: ▪︎Wife: Lady, of the Jeonju Yi clan (전주 이씨); great-great-granddaughter of King Seongjong and great-great-granddaughter of Han Hwak. ▪︎Issue: 2 sons. [Lineage: King Seongjong → Prince Ikyang (익양군; 1488–1552) → Prince Yongcheon (용천군; 1505–1569) → Prince Giseong (기성군; 1543–?) → Lady Yi; Lineage: Han Hwak → Han Chi-rye (한치례; 1441–1499) → Han Ik (한익; 1460–1488) → Han Se-chang (한세창) → Lady, of the Cheongju Han clan (청주 한씨) → Lady Yi])
  - Yu Hui-dam (유희담; 1563–?) (Note: ▪︎Wife: Lady, of the Haenam Yun clan (해남 윤씨); daughter of Yun Gyeon (윤견). ▪︎Issue: 1 son.)
  - Yu Hui-bun (유희분; 1564–1623) (Note: ▪︎Wife: Lady, of the Changnyeong Seong clan (창녕 성씨); daughter of Seong Jil (성질). ▪︎Issue: 5 sons (2 concubine-born sons), 4 daughters.)
  - Yu Hui-bal (유희발; 1568–1623) (Note: ▪︎1st wife: Lady, of the Cheongsong Shim clan (청송 심씨); daughter of Shim Gyu (심규). ▪︎2nd wife: Lady, of the Miryang Park clan (밀양 박씨); daughter of Park Chae (박채). ▪︎Issue: 7 sons, 2 daughters.)
  - Lady, of the Munhwa Yu clan (문화 유씨; 1570–?); given name Ok-yeong (옥영) (Note: Married Jo Guk-pil (조국필), Prince Hanchang (한창군) from the Hanyang Jo clan (한양 조씨).)
  - Lady, of the Munhwa Yu clan (문화 유씨; 1572–?); given name Jung-yeong (중영) (Note: Married Yi Deok-il (이덕일) from the Bupyeong Yi clan (부평 이씨).)
  - Yu Hui-ryang (유희량; 1575–1628) (Note: ▪︎Wife: Lady, of the Neungseong Gu clan (능성 구씨); great-granddaughter of King Jungjong and 4th great-granddaughter of King Sejong. ▪︎Issue: 1 son, 6 daughters (3 concubine-born daughters). [Lineage: King Sejong → Grand Prince Yeongeung (영응대군; 1434–1467) → County Princess Gilan (길안현주; 1457–1519) → Gu Sin-gyeong (구신경; 1494–1562) → Gu Han (구한; 1524–1558) → Gu Sa-seong (구사성; 1555–?) → Lady Gu; Lineage: King Jungjong → Princess Sukjeong (숙정옹주; 1525–1564) → Gu Sa-seong → Lady Gu])
  - Lady, of the Munhwa Yu clan (문화 유씨; 1576–?); given name So-yeong (소영) (Note: Married Kim Si-bo (김시보) from the Gwangsan Kim clan (광산 김씨).)
  - Yu Hui-an (유희안; 1581–1628)
- Husband: Gwanghaegun (광해군; 14 June 1575 – 7 August 1641)
  - Father-in-law: King Seonjo (선조대왕; 6 December 1552 – 16 March 1608)
  - Biological mother-in-law: Concubine Gong (공빈), of the Gimhae Kim clan (김해 김씨; 26 November 1553 – 23 June 1577)
  - Adoptive mother-in-law: Queen Uiin (의인왕후), of the Bannam Park clan (반남 박씨; 15 May 1555 – 26 July 1600)
  - Stepmother-in-law: Queen Inmok (인목왕후), of the Yonan Kim clan (연안 김씨; 15 December 1584 – 13 August 1632)
- Issue
  - Unnamed child (1592) (Note: Uncertain gender; most likely male.)
  - Unnamed son (1596)
  - Yi Ji (이지), Deposed Crown Prince (폐세자; 31 December 1598 – 22 July 1623)
  - Unnamed son (1601–1603)

== Ancestry ==
Ancestors of Deposed Queen Yu

Yu Je-geun (유제근)
Yu Su-cheon (유수천)
Yu Jam (유잠)
Kim Seong-dong (김성동)
Lady, of the Andong Kim clan (안동 김씨)
Lady, of the Jinju Kang clan (진주 강씨)
Yu Ja-shin, Internal Prince Wonyang (문양부원군 유자신)
Jeong Sung-jo (정숭조)
Jeong Seung-yeom (정승염)
Lady, of the Pyongyang Jo clan (평양 조씨)
Lady, of the Hadong Jeong clan (하동 정씨)
Kim Geuk-jang (김극장)
Lady, of the Eonyang Kim clan (언양 김씨)
Deposed Queen Yu
Jeong Gwang-pil (정광필)
Jeong Bok-gyeom (정복겸)
Lady, of the Eunjin Song clan (은진 송씨)
Jeong Yu-gil (정유길)
Yi Su-yeong (이수영)
Lady, of the Yi clan (이씨)
Internal Princess Consort Bongwon, of the Dongnae Jeong clan (봉원부부인 동래 정씨)
Won Sun-jo (원순조)
Won Gye-chae (원계채)
Lady, of the Wonju Won clan (원주 원씨)
Yi Gyeom (이겸)
Lady, of the Jeonju Yi clan (전주 이씨)
Lady, of the Hanyang Jo clan (한양 조씨)

== In popular culture ==
- Portrayed by Kang Boo-ja in the 1974–1975 TBC TV series 500 Years of Women of the Yi dynasty: Queen Inmok.
- Portrayed by Lee Ki-seon in the 1986 MBC TV series 500 Years of Joseon: The Hoechun Gate.
- Portrayed by Jang Seo-hee in the 1995 KBS2 TV series West Palace.
- Portrayed by Hwang In-jeong in the 1999–2000 MBC TV series Hur Jun.
- Portrayed by Sa Kang in the 2003–2004 SBS TV series The King's Woman.
- Portrayed by Han Hyo-joo in the 2012 film Masquerade.
- Portrayed by Lee Si-a in the 2013 MBC TV series Hur Jun, The Original Story.
- Portrayed by Kim Hee-jung in the 2014–2015 KBS2 TV series The King's Face.
- Portrayed by Kim Hyo-seo in the 2015 MBC TV series Splendid Politics.
- Inspired a fictional queen portrayed by Lee Se-young in the 2019 tvN TV series The Crowned Clown.
- Portrayed by Park Min-jung the 2019 KBS2 TV series The Tale of Nokdu.

== See also ==
- History of Korea
- Political factions of Joseon
- Styles and titles in Joseon

== Notes ==
Deposed Queen Yu Munhwa Yu clan
Royal titles
Preceded by Queen Inmok of the Yonan Kim clan	Queen Consort of Joseon; 1608–1623	Succeeded by Queen Inyeol of the Cheongju Han clan
