= Prince Nŭngp'ung =

Korean prince (1596–1604)

Prince Neungpung 능풍군
- 4th rank Officer of Joseon 조선의 부수(副守)

Prince of Joseon (posthumously)
- Coronation: 1872
- Predecessor: Prince Neungyang
- Successor: Prince Neungwon
- Born: Yi Myeong (이명; 李佲); 1596; His father's private house, Pyeongyang-si, Pyeongan-do, Joseon
- Died: November 1604 (aged 9); His father's private house, Gyeonggi Province, Joseon
- Issue: 1. Yi Sik, Prince Yeongpung (adopted); 2. Yi Jeong, Prince Gwangcheon (adopted); 3. Yi Tak, Prince Seongpyeong (adopted)
- House: House of Yi
- Father: Wonjong of Joseon
- Mother: Lady of the Pyeongyang Gim clan (biological); Queen Inheon of the Neungseong Gu clan (legal adoptive)

- Prince Nŭngp'ung
- Hangul: 이명
- Hanja: 李佲
- RR: I Myeong
- MR: I Myŏng

Royal title
- Hangul: 능풍군
- Hanja: 綾豐君
- RR: Neungpunggun
- MR: Nŭngp'unggun

Prince Neungpung (Korean: 능풍군; Hanja: 綾豐君; 1596 – November 1604), personal name Yi Myeong (이명; 李佲), was a Mid-late Joseon Royal Prince of Korea and the only son of Wonjong of Joseon and Lady of the Pyeongyang Gim clan. He was the younger half brother of Injo of Joseon.

== Biography ==
Yi became 4th Officer (부수; 副守) in 1601. Three years later, in November 1604, he died at age 9. Because of his early death, he did not marry. In March 1623, his older half brother, Yi Jong (이종), rebelled and ascended to the throne as King Injo (인조왕), but Myeong did not receive a royal title or posthumous name. Later, in 1872, during the 29th year of the reign of King Gojong, the Prince was given a royal title as Prince Neungpung (능풍군; 綾豐君) and became Yeongjongjeonggyeong (영종정경; 領宗正卿).

The Prince's tomb is located in Naegak-ri, Jeopdong-myeon, Pungyang-hyeon, Yangju, Gyeonggi Province (now around Naegak-ri, Jinjeop-eup, Namyangju, Gyeonggi Province) but the specific location is unknown.

== Family ==
- Father: Wonjong of Joseon (조선 원종; 2 August 1580 – 29 December 1619)
- Mother:
  - Biological: Lady of the Pyeongyang Gim clan (평양 김씨)
  - Legal adoptive: Queen Inheon of the Neungseong Gu clan (인헌왕후 구씨; 17 April 1578 – 14 January 1626)

Since the Prince died young, so he never married. For descendants House of Yi, some princes listed themselves as his adopted son.

- Adopted issue:
  - Son: Yi Sik, Prince Yeongpung (이식 영풍군; 1628–1692) – the first son of Grand Prince Neungwon (능원대군) and Grand Princess Consort of the Yeongam Gim clan (부부인 영암 김씨).
  - Son: Yi Jeong, Prince Gwangcheon (이정 광천군; 19 August 1652 – 12 March 1735) – the son of Yi Geub, Prince Haeryeong (이급 해령군), the fourth son of Yi Gong, Prince Inseong (이공 인성군) and Princess Consort Yun (군부인 윤씨), the second daughter of Yun Seung-Gil (윤승길).
    - Grandson: Yi Pyo, Prince Pyeongwon (이표 평원군; 24 November 1685 – 6 November 1725)
  - Son: Yi Tak, Prince Seongpyeong (이탁 성평군; 1663–1713) – the first son of Yi U, Prince Nangseon (이우 낭선군), the oldest son of Yi Yeong, Prince Inheung (이영 인흥군). Prince Inheung was Seonjo of Joseon's 12nd son from his 4th concubine, Royal Noble Consort Jeong of the Yeoheung Min clan.
