= Yu (Chinese surname) =

Yu is the pinyin romanisation of several Chinese family names. However, in the Wade–Giles romanisation system, Yu is equivalent to You in pinyin. "Yu" may represent many different Chinese characters, including 余, 于, 由, 魚 (鱼), 漁(渔), 楀, 俞(兪), 喻 (this character is 35th name on the Hundred Family Surnames poem), 於, 遇, 虞, 郁, 尉, 禹, 游, 尤, 庾, 娛(娱), and 茹 (Rú).

The most common of the Yu surnames are 于, 余, and 俞. In China, 0.62% of the population have the family name 于 in 2002 (about 7.4 million), and this surname is most common in Shandong province and northeastern China. Around 0.41% of the population have the surname 余 in 2002 (over five million), and it is most common in Jiangxi, Zhejiang and Fujian provinces. The 俞 surname represents around 0.12% of China's population.

== Surname Yu (俞) ==
=== History ===
Yu (Chinese: 俞; pinyin: Yú) is said to have been derived as a term used by medical practitioners Yu (腧) since the time of The Yellow Emperor. The two words are closely related and the family name was changed from Yu (腧) to Yu (俞).

During the Zhou dynasty period, the Zheng ruler Duke Wen of Zheng (鄭文公)'s son created a family name Yu (俞). The surname was also used by the ruling families of the state of Chu. The surname is also found in various minority people such as the Yi people (彝), Hui people (回), etc.

It is the 57th name on the Hundred Family Surnames poem.

=== Prominent people with family name 俞 ===
- Kelvin Yii 俞利文; born 1986, Malaysian politician
- Yu Dayou 俞大猷, pirate suppressor.
- Yu Dechao 俞德超, biotechnology inventor and entrepreneur
- Yu Shan (actress) 俞珊, Chinese actress
- Yu Zigao 俞諮皋, Chinese patriot of the Ming dynasty.
- Yu Zhengsheng, Chinese politician, current Chairman of the Chinese People's Political Consultative Conference.
- Yu Hung-chun
- Yu Hua, Chinese novelist.
- Yu Kuo-hwa

In Korean, the name is transcribed as Woo (禹 and 于), or Yoo (兪 and 余).

== Surname Yu (虞) ==
The surname was derived from the State of Yú 虞國/国. The name is transliterated as Ngu in Vietnamese but is very rare in Vietnam.

=== History ===
According to Chinese legend, Yu (Chinese: 虞; pinyin: Yú) is an ancient surname in China. The ancestors of the surname were closely linked with the ancient sage-king named Yu Shun. When Yu Shun was getting old, he took his initiative to hand over the state power to Da Yu. Da Yu granted Yu Shun's son Shang Jun (商均) the Yu kingdom (虞國/国, now in Yucheng, Henan Province). Later, the descendants of Shang Jun took the name of the kingdom as their surname.

During the Zhou dynasty, Zhou Wu Wang (1134–1115 BC) granted the descendants of Zhongyong of Wu, the son of King Tai of Zhou, territory to the northeast of Pinglu in Shanxi. The kingdom was named Yu (虞國/国) and they took the name of Yu (虞) after the kingdom.

=== Prominent people with family name 虞 ===
- Yu Fan
- Yu Hsiao-cheng, Deputy Chairperson of National Communications Commission of the Republic of China
- Yu Shinan
- Concubine Yu
- Esther Yu, Chinese actress and singer

== Others ==
=== Surname 魚 ===
The name is transliterated as Ngư in Vietnamese but is very rare in Vietnam.

=== Surname 郁 ===
The name is transliterated as Úc/Uất in Vietnamese but is very rare in Vietnam.

- Yu Dafu

=== Surname 庾 ===
The name is transliterated as Dữu in Vietnamese but is very rare in Vietnam.

=== Prominent people with family name 庾 ===
- Harlem Yu, Taiwanese entertainer
- Yu Xin, poet

== See also ==
- List of people with surname Yu
- List of common Chinese surnames
- Chinese name
- You
- Yu (Korean name)
