= Ku Samaeng =

Ku Samaeng 구사맹
- Internal Prince Neungan (능안부원군; 綾安府院君)
- Born: Ku Samaeng (구사맹); 1531; Joseon
- Died: 1626 (aged 94-95); Woo Temple, Songhyeon Village, Hanseong, Joseon
- Burial: Geumgok-dong, Namyangju, Gyeonggi Province, South Korea
- Spouse: Internal Princess Consort Seowon of the Cheongju Han clan; Internal Princess Consort Pyeongsan of the Pyeongsan Shin clan
- Issue: 4 sons and 6 daughters, including Queen Inheon
- House: Neungseong Gu clan
- Father: Ku Sun
- Mother: Lady Yi of the Jeonju Yi clan

Korean name
- Hangul: 구사맹
- Hanja: 具思孟
- RR: Gu Samaeng
- MR: Ku Samaeng

Art name
- Hangul: 팔곡
- Hanja: 八谷
- RR: Palgok
- MR: P'algok

Courtesy name
- Hangul: 경시
- Hanja: 景時
- RR: Gyeongsi
- MR: Kyŏngsi

Posthumous name
- Hangul: 문의
- Hanja: 文懿
- RR: Munui
- MR: Munŭi

Ku Samaeng (Korean: 구사맹; Hanja: 具思孟; 1531–1622) was a 16th-century Korean nobleman, military officer and minister. He was the father of Queen Inheon and the maternal grandfather of Injo of Joseon.

== Biography ==
In 1549 (4th year of King Myeongjong), Ku Samaeng was appointed as Jinsa (진사). In 1558, at 27 years old he passed the national examination as a military officer and worked in Seungmunwon (승문원; 承文院) as an inspector.

In 1560, he become a general and three years later, he went to the Ming Dynasty as the secretary of Saeun Temple. He spent the following years as Ijojwarang (이조좌랑) and Ijojŏngnang (이조정랑).

In 1567 after King Myeongjong's death, Ku become Pinjŏndogamjejo (빈전도감제조; 殯殿都監提調). Two years later, in 1569 (2nd year of King Seonjo's reign), he was appointed as the Governor of Hwanghae Province.

In 1587, one of his youngest daughters married Grand Prince Jeongwon, the son of King Seonjo, and became the mother to three sons; one of them becoming the future king.

From then on, he started to serve in numerous government posts in the central and local areas during the reign of Seonjo of Joseon. Meanwhile, during the Imjin War (임진왜란), in 1597 (30th year of King Seonjo's reign), Ku served some of the Royal Princes. At this time, he was a Right Chamchan (2nd senior rank; 우참찬, 右參贊).

Ku Samaeng died on April 1, 1604 (37th year of King Seonjo's reign), at the age of 74 years old due to the relapse of his chronic disease, which had plagued him since he was working in the Uigeumbu.

After his grandson ascended the throne as King Injo, along with posthumously honouring his parents as King and Queen, he also honoured his maternal grandfather as Internal Prince Neungan (능안부원군; 綾安府院君).

It was said that in Ku's eulogy, it was written that he was a simple and quiet man by nature, and also liked frugality. So he didn't own land or a house, but only enjoyed his coat of arms ("천성이 담백하고 조용하였으며, 검소한 것을 좋아하여 땅이나 집을 장만하지 않고 오로지 문장을 즐겼다.").

His tomb is located in Namyangju, Gyeonggi Province, along with his two wives, Lady Han (한씨) and Lady Shin (신씨).

=== Books ===
There are two books written by Ku Samaeng:

- Yuhuichun (유희춘; 柳希春)
- Yihwang (이황; 李滉)

== Family ==
- Father – Ku Sun (구순, 具淳/具諄; 1507–1551)
- Mother – Lady Yi of the Jeonju Yi clan (전주 이씨; 1506–1572) (Note: She was the great-great-granddaughter of Grand Prince Hyoryeong through his third son, Yi Gab.)

Sibling(s)

- Older brother – Ku Saan (구사안, 具思顔; 1523–1562)
- Older sister – Lady Ku (구씨; 1525–?)
- Older sister – Lady Ku (구씨; 1527–?)
- Older brother – Ku Sajŭng (구사증; 具思曾; 1528–1610)
- Older sister – Lady Ku (구씨; 1530–1592)
- Younger sister – Lady Ku (구씨; 1532–?)
- Younger brother – Ku Sajung (구사중; 具思仲; 1540–1618)
- Younger brother – Ku Samin (구사민; 具愚閔; 1542–1593) (Note: Ancestor of LG founder Koo In-hwoi.)

Wives and their issue:

- Internal Princess Consort Sŏwŏn of the Cheongju Han clan (서원부부인 청주 한씨; 1532–1544) – No issue.
- Internal Princess Consort P'yŏngsan of the Pyongsan Shin clan (평산부부인 평산 신씨; 1538–1622)
  - Son – Ku Sŏng (구성; 具宬; 1558–1618)
  - Son – Ku Hoeng (구횡; 1562–1636)
  - Daughter – Lady Ku (구씨; 具氏; 1563–1620)
  - Daughter – Lady Ku (구씨; 具氏; 1564–?)
  - Son – Ku Yong (구용; 具容; 1569–1601)
  - Son – Ku Koeng (구굉; 具宖; 1577–1562)
  - Daughter – Queen Inheon of the Neungseong Gu clan (인헌왕후 구씨; 23 May 1578 – 10 February 1626)
    - Son-in-law – Wonjong of Joseon (조선 원종; 2 August 1580 – 2 February 1620)
  - Daughter – Lady Ku (구씨; 具氏; 1589–1615), Ryu Chung-geol's first wife
