= Yu Sang =

Korean physician (1643–1723)

- Hangul: 유상; 류상 (Note: The hanja character 柳 can be read as both Yu (유) or Ryu (류).)
- Hanja: 柳瑺; 柳尙; 柳相
- RR: Yu Sang; Ryu Sang
- MR: Yu Sang; Ryu Sang

Courtesy name
- Hangul: 여진
- Hanja: 汝珍
- RR: Yeojin
- MR: Yŏjin

Yu Sang (Korean: 유상; Hanja: 柳瑺; 柳尙; 柳相; 1643–1723), alternatively Ryu Sang (류상), courtesy name Yŏjin (汝珍, 여진), was a royal court physician and politician of the Korean Joseon dynasty. He was a smallpox specialist who successfully treated three Joseon kings.

In 1693, due to having cured Sukjong's smallpox, he was granted a political office. Later he became the governor of Seosan, Goyang, Hapcheon and Saknyeong.

His experiences with smallpox are detailed in his book, Kogŭm Kyŏnghŏm Hwalyubang (古今經驗活幼方).

Supernatural anecdotes featuring him and a divine being circulated due to his fame.

== Family ==
He was a 23rd-generation descendant of the Munhwa Yu clan. His father Yu Kyŏngjip (柳景緝) served as an observation officer (觀察使, gwanchalsa). His son Yu Chungnim (柳重臨) was also a medical practitioner who also wrote the agricultural text Chŭngbo sallim kyŏngje.
