= Consort Yu (Yongle) =

Ming dynasty concubine (died 1421)

Consort Zhongjingzhaoshunxian 忠敬昭順賢妃
- Died: 1421; Beijing
- Spouse: Yongle Emperor
Posthumous name
- Zhaoshun (昭順) →; Zhongjingzhaoshun (忠敬昭順)
- Clan: Yu (喻)

Consort Xian (喻賢妃; died 1421), of the Yu clan, was a consort of the Yongle Emperor.

Little is known about her early life. It is only recorded that Lady Yu was enfeoffed as Consort Xian. On 22 April 1421, Consort Yu died. The Yongle Emperor suspended court audiences for one day, bestowed sacrificial rites, and posthumously honored her as Consort Zhaoshun. Her funeral rites were conducted according to the precedent set for Consort Zhaoxian. On 26 May of the same year, she was further granted the additional posthumous title Consort Zhongjingzhaoshun.

In the year Consort Yu died, the Joseon Sejong Sillok documented a "Eo-Ryeo (or Yu-Lü) disturbance" (魚呂之亂) in the Yongle Emperor's imperial harem. Some Korean researchers have noted that, based on the timing of Consort Yu's death, there may have been a mistake in the recording of her name. This is because the characters for "喻" and "鱼" are homophones, leading to the possibility that she was mistakenly recorded as Lady Eo (Yu) (鱼氏) by the Joseon side.

== Titles ==
- During the reign of the Hongwu Emperor (r. 1368–1398):
  - Lady Yu (喻氏)
- During the reign of the Yongle Emperor (r. 1402–1424)
  - Consort Xian (賢妃; from unknown date)
  - Consort Zhaoshunxian (昭順賢妃; from 1421)
  - Consort Zhongjingzhaoshunxian (忠敬昭順賢妃; from 1421)
