= Queen Inheon =

Queen of Joseon (1578–1626)

- Queen Consort of Joseon (posthumously)
- Born: 2 June 1578; Hanseong, Joseon
- Died: 10 February 1626 (aged 47); Hoesangjeon, Gyeongdeokgung, Hanseong, Joseon
- Burial: Jangneung, Gimpo, South Korea
- Spouse: King Wonjong (m. 1590; died 1620)
- Issue Detail: 3 sons
Posthumous name
- Queen Gyeongui Jeongjeong Inheon (경의정정인헌왕후; 敬毅貞靖仁獻王后)
- Clan: Neungseong Gu (by birth); Jeonju Yi (by marriage)
- Dynasty: Yi (by marriage)
- Father: Gu Sa-maeng, Internal Prince Neungan
- Mother: Internal Princess Consort Pyongsan, of the Pyongsan Shin clan

Korean name
- Hangul: 인헌왕후
- Hanja: 仁獻王后
- RR: Inheon wanghu
- MR: Inhŏn wanghu

Queen Inheon (Korean: 인헌왕후; Hanja: 仁獻王后; 2 June 1578 – 10 February 1626), of the Neungseong Gu clan, was the wife of Grand Internal Prince Jeongwon (King Wonjong) and the mother of King Injo, the 16th monarch of Joseon. She was styled as Grand Princess Consort Yeonju and Lady Gyeun (Note: Or Lady of Gyeun (Note: lit. ''enlightening fortune'') Palace.) during the reign of her son, and was later posthumously elevated to the position of queen.

== Biography ==
=== Early life and lineage ===
The future Queen Inheon was born during the reign of King Seonjo, as the second youngest child and fifth daughter among four sons and six daughters. Her father was Gu Sa-maeng and her mother was his second wife, a lady from the Pyongsan Shin clan.

Her paternal grandfather, Gu Sun (구순), was a great-great-grandson of King Sejong and a first cousin twice removed of Queen Jeongsun via the elder daughter of Grand Prince Yeongeung (영응대군), County Princess Gilan (길안현주); he was also a grandnephew of Deposed Queen Shin and a first cousin once removed of Queen Dangyeong via his mother. Additionally, Lady Gu's paternal grandmother was herself a member of the royal house as a great-granddaughter of Prince Boseong (보성군), the third son of Sejong's elder brother, Grand Prince Hyoryeong.

On her maternal side, Lady Gu was a niece of Shin Rip and once again a descendant of King Sejong as a great-great-great-granddaughter of his eighth son, Prince Gyeyang.

Overall, the Neungseong Gu clan had an extensive history of intermarriage with the royal family. The most prominent matches are Lady Gu's uncle, Gu Sa-an (구사안), and King Jungjong's seventh daughter, Princess Hyosun (효순공주); her first cousin twice removed, Gu Han (구한), and King Jungjong's eighth daughter, Princess Sukjeong (숙정옹주); and her great-uncle, Gu Mun-myeong (구문경), and Princess Hwisin.

=== Marriage ===
In 1590, around the age of 12, Lady Gu married Prince Jeongwon, the fifth son of King Seonjo by Concubine In. She gave birth to three sons between 1595 and 1599, and was widowed in 1620.

=== Later life ===
In 1623, following a coup d'état that dethroned Gwanghaegun, her eldest son, Prince Neungyang (posthumously King Injo), acceded to the throne. Prince Jeongwon was then elevated to grand internal prince (대원군; daewongun) and Lady Gu became a grand princess consort (부부인; bubuin). (Note: It is a common misconception that Lady Gu and King Seonjo's mother, Lady Jeong, were titled "grand internal princess consort" (부대부인; budaebuin), but this didn't become the standard title until King Cheoljong's reign in the 19th century.) She was also separately granted "Gyeun" (계운) as her palace name (궁호).

=== Death and aftermath ===
Lady died three years later, at the age of 47. She was buried within Yukgyeongwon (육경원) in present-day Gimpo, Gyeonggi Province. Her husband was soon relocated to this site and the name was changed to Heunggyeongwon (흥경원).

In 1632, Prince Jeongwon was controversially raised to the position of king and received a temple name. Accordingly, Lady Gu was posthumously honored as queen and their tomb was designated as Jangneung (장릉).

== Titles ==
- During the reign of King Seonjo (r. 1567–1608):
  - Lady, of the Neungseong Gu clan (능성 구씨; 綾城具氏; from 2 June 1578)
    - Gu Sa-maeng's daughter (구사맹의 딸)
    - Lady Gu (구씨; 具氏)
  - Princess Consort Yeonju (연주군부인; 連珠郡夫人; from 1590)
- During the reign of King Injo (r. 1623–1649):
  - Grand Princess Consort Yeonju (연주군부인; 連珠郡夫人; from 22 April 1623)
  - Lady Gyeun (계운궁; 啓運宮; from 1623)
  - Queen Inheon (인헌왕후; 仁獻王后; from 1632)

== Family ==
- Father: Gu Sa-maeng (구사맹), Internal Prince Neungan (능안부원군; 1531–1604)
- Stepmother: Internal Princess Consort Seowon (서원부부인), of the Cheongju Han clan (청주 한씨) (Note: Gu Sa-maeng's first wife; daughter of Han Geuk-gong (한극공).)
- Mother: Internal Princess Consort Pyongsan (평산부부인), of the Pyongsan Shin clan (평산 신씨; 1538–1662); given name Ji-hyang (신지향)
- Sibling(s)
  - Gu Seong (구성; 1558–1618) (Note: ▪︎1st wife: Lady, of the Hadong Jeong clan (하동 정씨); daughter of Jeong Eok-ryeong (정억령). ▪︎2nd wife: Lady, of the Jeonju Yi clan (전주 이씨); daughter of Yi Gyeong (이갱). ▪︎Issue: 3 sons, 3 daughters.)
  - Gu Hoeng (구횡; 1562–?) (Note: Adopted as the heir of Gu Sa-maeng's elder brother, Gu Sa-an (구사안), Prince Consort Neungwon (능원위; 1523–1562). Gu Sa-an was married to Princess Hyosun (효순공주; 1522–1538), the seventh daughter of King Jungjong by Queen Munjeong.)
  - Lady, of the Neungseong Gu clan (능성 구씨; 1563–1620); given name Gyeong-wan (경완) (Note: Married Shim Eom (심엄; 1563–1609) from the Cheongsong Shim clan (청송 심씨); second son of Shim Ui-gyeom and nephew of Queen Insun. They had issue (7 sons, 4 daughters); including Shim Jeong-se (심정세; 1579–1613), the brother-in-law of Queen Inmok.)
  - Lady, of the Neungseong Gu clan (능성 구씨; 1567–?); given name Hyo-wan (효완) (Note: Married Hong Hui (홍희) from the Namyang Hong clan (남양 홍씨). They had issue (3 sons, 1 daughter).)
  - Lady, of the Neungseong Gu clan (능성 구씨; 1568–?); given name Jeong-wan (정완) (Note: Gwon Yu-nam (권유남) from the Andong Gwon clan (안동 권씨). They had issue (1 son, 1 daughter).)
  - Gu Yong (구용; 1569–1601) (Note: ▪︎Lady, of a certain clan (모씨). ▪︎Issue: 1 son, 1 daughter.)
  - Lady, of the Neungseong Gu clan (능성 구씨; 1571–?); given name Jang-wan (장완) (Note: Married Kim Deok-mang (김덕망) from the Gwangsan Kim clan (광산 김씨). They had issue (5 sons, 5 daughters).)
  - Gu Goeng (구굉; 1577–1642) (Note: ▪︎Wife: Lady, of the Sunchang Jo clan (순창 조씨); daughter of Jo Jeong (조정). ▪︎Issue: 2 sons, 4 daughters.)
  - Lady, of the Neungseong Gu clan (능성 구씨; 1582–?); given name Sin-wan (신완) (Note: Married Yi Bak (이박) from the Goseong Yi clan (고성 이씨).)
- Husband: King Wonjong (원종대왕; 12 August 1580 – 23 January 1620)
  - Father-in-law: King Seonjo (선조대왕; 6 December 1552 – 16 March 1608)
  - Biological mother-in-law: Concubine In (인빈), of the Suwon Kim clan (수원 김씨; 31 March 1555 – 30 November 1613
  - Adoptive mother-in-law: Queen Uiin (의인왕후), of the Bannam Park clan (반남 박씨; 15 May 1555 – 26 July 1600)
  - Stepmother-in-law: Queen Inmok (인목왕후), of the Yonan Kim clan (연안 김씨; 15 December 1584 – 13 August 1632)
- Issue
  - Yi Jong (이종), King Injo (인조대왕; 7 December 1595 – 17 June 1649)
  - Yi Bo (이보), Grand Prince Neungwon (능원대군; 15 May 1598 – 26 January 1656)
  - Yi Jeon, (이전), Grand Prince Neungchang (능창대군; 5 September 1599 – 5 January 1615)

== Ancestry ==
Ancestors of Queen Inheon

Gu Su-yeong (구수영)
Gu Hui-gyeong (구희경)
County Princess Gilan (길안현주)
Gu Sun (구순)
Shin Su-gyeom (신수겸)
Lady, of the Geochang Shin clan (거창 신씨)
Lady, of the Jinju Kang clan (진주 강씨)
Gu Sa-maeng, Internal Prince Neungan (능안부원군 구사맹)
Prince Pyeongseong (평성군)
Prince Uisin (의신군)
Lady, of the Incheon Chae clan (인천 채씨)
Lady, of the Jeonju Yi clan (전주 이씨)
Kim Yeong-nyeon (김영년)
Lady, of the Eonyang Kim clan (언양 김씨)
Queen Inheon
Shin Mal-pyeong (신말평)
Shin Sang (신상)
Lady, of the Andong Gwon clan (안동 권씨)
Shin Hwa-guk (신화국)
Prince Burim (부림군)
Lady, of the Jeonju Yi clan (전주 이씨)
Lady, of the (old) Andong Kim clan (구 안동 김씨)
Internal Princess Consort Pyongsan, of the Pyongsan Shin clan (평산부부인 평산 신씨)
Yun Hoe-jeong (윤회정)
Lady, of the Papyeong Yun clan (파평 윤씨)

== See also ==
- History of Korea
- Styles and titles in Joseon
