= Consort Yu (Borjigin) =

Consort of the Qianlong Emperor (1730 –1774)

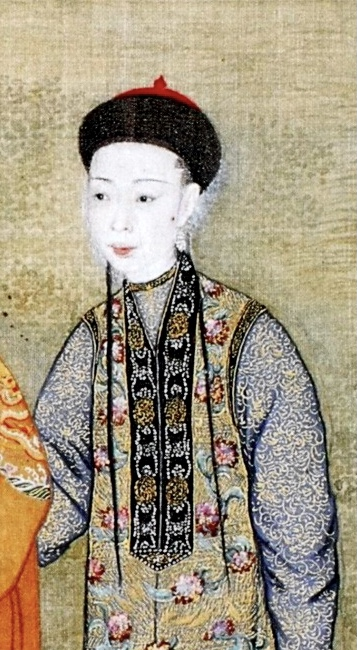
- Born: February 12, 1730
- Died: January 31, 1774 (aged 43)

Consort Yu (Chinese: 豫妃; 1730–1774), of the Mongol Oirat Borjigin clan, was an imperial consort of the Qianlong Emperor of the Qing dynasty. She was 18 or 19 years his junior.

== Life ==
Lady Borjigin (博尔济吉特氏) was born in 1730. Her exact date of birth is not known. She grew up in Mongolia and entered the Forbidden City as a palace maid in 1757. In 1758 received the title "Noble Lady Duo" (多貴人) . In 1759 she became pregnant, but miscarried and was promoted to "Imperial Concubine Yu" (豫嬪) as consolation. Five years later, in 1764, she was promoted to "Consort Yu" (豫妃), the title she would hold until her death in 1774, at the age of forty-three or forty-four. Consort Yu received no posthumous promotions or honors.

== Titles ==
- In the reign of the Yongzheng Emperor (r. 1722–1735):
  - Lady Borjigin (from 1730)
- In the reign of the Qianlong Emperor (r. 1735–1796):
  - Palace Maid (1757)
  - Noble Lady Duo (1758)
  - Imperial Concubine Yu (1759)
  - Consort Yu (1764)
