= Prince Hwaŭi =

Joseon prince

Yi Yŏng 이영
- Prince Hwaŭi (화의군)
- Born: September 5, 1425; Joseon
- Died: 1460 (age 35); Joseon
- Burial: Eunpyeong District, Seoul, South Korea
- Consort: Lady Park of the Miryang Park clan
- Issue: Seven sons
- Clan: Jeonju Yi clan
- Dynasty: House of Yi
- Father: Sejong of Joseon
- Mother: Royal Noble Consort Yeong of the Jinju Kang clan
- Religion: Neo-confucianism

Prince Hwaŭi (Korean: 화의군; 5 September 1425 – 1460 (Note: Lunar dates)), personal name Yi Yŏng (이영), was a prince of the Joseon period of Korea. He was the sixth son of Sejong the Great and younger brother of Munjong of Joseon and Sejo of Joseon.

== Biography ==
Yi Yŏng was born on 5 September 1425 as the sixth son King Sejong, by his concubine, Royal Noble Consort Yeong of the Jinju Kang clan.

In January 1433, he was granted the title of Prince Hwaŭi (화의군). In the 20th year of King Sejong (1438), he entered Sungkyunkwan. On October 8 of the same year, he married Lady Park, daughter of Park Jung-son (박중손), as his primary wife.

In 1441, he conspired with his half-brother, Grand Prince Imyŏng, to bring a civilian woman into the palace in men's clothes.

He was impeached and exiled several times for participating in the movement against Prince Suyang to restore King Danjong.

After that, all property, including slaves and fields, were confiscated, and the children were demoted to the lowly status. His family was exiled for nearly 30 years. He was released during the reign of King Seongjong but was reinstated only during the reign of King Jungjong.

== Family ==
Parents

- Father: Sejong the Great of Joseon (세종대왕, 15 May 1397 – 8 April 1450)
- Mother: Royal Noble Consort Yeong of the Jinju Kang clan (영빈 강씨)

Consorts and issue:

- Princess Consort, of the Miryang Park clan (군부인밀양 박씨), daughter of Park Joong-son (박중손)
  - First Son: Yi Wŏn (이원), Prince Yŏhŭng (여흥군)
  - Second Son: Yi Pŏn (이번), Prince Yŏsŏng ( 여성군)
  - Third Son: Yi Sik (이식), Prince Kŭmransu (금란수)
- Concubine: Lady Annan (첩부인 아난)
  - Son: Yi Kŏllidong (이건리동; 李件理同)
- Concubine: Lady Naeun-geum (첩부인내금)
  - Son: Yi Sudal (이수달)
- Concubine: Daughter of Kam Chi (감지)
  - Son: Yi P'aengsu (이팽수)
- Unknown Concubine
  - Son: Unknown name
