= Miryang Park clan =

Korean clan from South Gyeongsang Province

Miryang Park clan Milseong Park clan
- Country: Korea
- Current region: Miryang
- Founder: Pak Ŏnch'im
- Website: milyangpark.com

The Miryang Park clan (Korean: 밀양 박씨; Hanja: 密陽朴氏) or Milseong Park clan (밀성 박씨; 密城朴氏) is a Korean clan from Miryang, now in South Gyeongsang Province, South Korea. The clan descends from the 10th century prince Pak Ŏnch'im (박언침; 朴彦忱), son of King Gyeongmyeong of Silla.

== Goryeo royalty ==
- Lady Janggyeong of Jinhan State (진한국장경비), wife of Wang Pun, Marquess Ikyang, a great-grandson of Sinjong of Goryeo

== Joseon royalty ==
- Internal Princess Consort Park (부부인 밀양 박씨), wife of Grand Prince Yeongseong, half-brother of Taejo
- Royal Consort Gwi-in Park (귀인 박씨), Sejong the Great's concubine
- Princess Consort Park (군부인밀양 박씨), daughter of Park Joong-son (박중손) and wife of Yi Yeong, Prince Hwaui
- Royal Noble Consort Gyeong (경빈 박씨), concubine of Jungjong of Joseong
- Deposed Crown Princess Park (폐빈 박씨), wife of Deposed Crown Prince Yi Ji
- Royal Noble Consort Myeong (명빈), concubine of Sukjong of Joseon and mother of Prince Yeollyeong
- Royal Consort Sug-ui Park (숙의 박씨), wife of Sunjo of Joseon and mother of his only illegitimate child, Princess Yeongon
- Royal Consort Gwi-in Park (귀인 박씨), concubine of Cheoljong of Joseon and mother of his first son

== Military Aristocracy ==
During Joseon dynasty, where its Caste System required families to produce members that passed the National Service Exam at least every fourth generation to maintain their Yangban Status, the Miryang Park Clan distinguished itself by producing numerous Gwageo exam selectees: 261 in the Literary Exam (문과) and 1,125 in the Military Exam (무과). Although Korean Yangbans did not formally have hereditary military and literary families, Miryang Park clan comes close to being a military clan, simply due to the majority of its Gwageo applicants passing the military exam and pursuing a military career throughout the Joseon dynasty.

In modern times, the chaebeol families of Doosan Group and POSCO founders are of the Miryang Park Clan.

== Notable members ==
- Pak Ton-ji (1342–1422), Korean scholar-bureaucrat of the Goryeo and Joseon dynasties
- Park Maeng-woo (born 1951), South Korean politician
- Joon Park (born 1969), Korean-American singer and entertainer, member of g.o.d
- Park Jae-sang (or "Psy", born 1977), South Korean singer
- Park Soyeon (or Soyeon, born 1987), South Korean singer and actress, member of T-ara
- Park Bo-young (born 1990), South Korean actress
- Park Hyung-sik (born 1991), South Korean actor and singer
- Park Ji-min (or "Jimin", born 1995), South Korean singer, member of BTS
- Park Seong-hwa (or "Seonghwa", born 1998), South Korean singer, member of ATEEZ
- Park Ji-sung (or "Jisung", born 2002), South Korean singer, member of NCT
- Sunghoon (born 2002), South Korean singer and former figure skater, member of Enhypen
- Park Jeongsong (born 2002), South Korean singer, member of Enhypen
- Park Min-ju (or “Minju“, born 2004), South Korean singer, member of ILLIT
