= Yoo Jaehoon =

South Korean businessman

Yoo JaeHoon is the Chairman of the Global Overseas Adoptees'Link (GOAL), NGO that was established in 1998 to provide post-adoption services to Korean overseas adoptees including birth family search, cultural exchanges, and social integration programs.

Prior to the current position, he was the Chairman and President of the Korea Deposit Insurance Corporation (KDIC)from November 2022 to December 2025 He also worked as ex-officio Commissioner of the Financial Services Commission (South Korea). In November 2024, he assumed the position of First Vice Chair of the International Forum of Insurance Guarantee Schemes(IFIGS). He was also a member of the Executive Council of the International Association of Deposit Insurers (IADI), where he served as the Chairperson of the Asia-Pacific Regional Committee (APRC).

== Early life ==
Yoo has a BA in economics and an MA in public administration from Seoul National University, and an MA (DEA) in international economics at Sciences Po de Paris. He graduated from the Ecole Nationale d'Administration (ENA) in France. He obtained a PhD in economics from Kyonggi University in 2011.

== Career ==
During his 40-year career in public service, he worked on capital market development, financial policy, and international cooperation for developing countries.

From 1997 to 2000, Yoo worked as an economist at the Asian Development Bank (ADB) in Manila. He served as a senior securities market specialist at the World Bank (WB) and International Finance Corporation (IFC) between 2005 and 2008. Yoo was the president of the Sciences Po de Paris Korean Alumni Association.

He worked as spokesperson for the Financial Services Commission (South Korea) from 2008 to 2009. He served as director general of the Treasury Bureau at the Ministry of Strategy and Finance (South Korea) from December 2009 to March 2011. He served as commissioner of the Securities and Futures Commission (SFC) from April 2012. He worked as chairman and CEO of Korea Securities Depository (KSD) from November 2013 to October 2016. Yoo also worked as director general and controller of the Asian Infrastructure Investment Bank (AIIB) from 2016 to 2019.

From 2017 to 2022, Yoo worked as a member of the international advisory council (IAC) of the China Securities Regulatory Commission (CSRC).

He served as emeritus professor of the Graduate School of Public Administration at Konkuk University in Korea and vice-dean/professor of the China-Japan-Korea Research Institute at Shandong University of Finance and Economics in China from 2019 to 2022.

In November 2022, Yoo was appointed as the president of the Korea Deposit Insurance Corporation (KDIC).

In May 2025, for his work with the Global Overseas Adoptees' Link, he was awarded a Presidential Commendation.

== Social Work ==
He has been actively engaged in several social works including Asia Future Institute (Chairman, 2016–2019, public diplomacy), China Capital Market Society (Founding Chairman, 2009–2019, financial research) in Korea, and Global Overseas Adoptees' Link (Chairman, 2016–2019, volunteer, a non-profit organization dedicated to supporting and advocating for overseas adoptees, promoting their rights, and fostering cultural exchange, for which he was awarded a Presidential Commendation).

== Publications ==
Yoo's publications include The Korean Bond Market: The Next Frontiers (2008) and Development Strategy for China Capital Market (2008). He published the papers Financing Innovation: How to Build an Efficient Exchange for Small Firms (2008) and Study on the Financial Characteristics and Financing Patterns of Innovative Firms (2011). He wrote a book "Creating an Artificial Sun (2016)" that sheds light on Korea's capital market development. In 2023, he also wrote a book "The Development of Korean Capital Market (Unpublished, 2023)", a comprehensive analysis of Korea's capital market evolution.

== Major Activities ==
- KDIC Chairman Yoo appeared in the video of the World Bank FCI Seoul Center's 10th anniversary celebration
- KDIC Chairman Met with World-renowned Scholar Philip Dybvig
- KDIC Chairman JaeHoon Yoo Delivered Congratulatory Remarks at the WB (World Bank) Webinar
- KDIC Chairman JaeHoon Yoo attended the European Forum of Deposit Insurers (EFDI) Conference held in Nice, and delivered a presentation titled "Geopolitical Risks and KDIC's Response"
- KDIC held a public hearing on improving the risk-based premium system to enhance incentives for financial institutions to strengthen their management
- KDIC Co-hosted the 2025 KDIC Asia-Pacific Forum with the Korean Securities Association to Enhance Trust in the Capital Market and Facilitate Regional Cooperation

== General Activities ==
- Yoo Jae-hoon, former president of the Korea Securities Depository, was appointed as the new president of the Korea Deposit Insurance Corporation Infostock daily, November 11, 2022.
- Ex-KSD Chairman Yoo Jae-hoon Takes Helm of KDIC NewsWorld, November 26, 2022.
- KDIC aims to expand scope of deposit insurance The Korea Times, March 8, 2023.
- KDIC considering expansion of deposit insurance Korea News Plus, March 9, 2023.
- Calls rise for bolstered deposit insurance coverage following SVB disaster The Korea Times, March 14, 2023.
- Established memorandum of understanding of cooperation with Korea Deposit Insurance Corporation Financial Regulatory Commission, June 28, 2023.
- The long-term goal of Mongolia is to introduce a "Differentiated Fee System" 24tsag.mn, June 28, 2023.
- Korea Deposit Insurance Corporation visited the CDIC on 25 August 2023 Central Deposit Insurance Corporation, August 31, 2023.
- Deposit Insurance of Vietnam's delegation visited and worked at Korea Deposit Insurance Corporation Deposit Insurance of Vietnam, September 12, 2023.
- The FDIC Announces Memorandum of Understanding with Korea Deposit Insurance Corporation, Formalizing Information Sharing and Cooperation Related to Resolution Planning and Implementation Federal Deposit Insurance Corporation, September 26, 2023.
- The Deposit Insurance Fund is expanding its international cooperation Azerbaijan Deposit Insurance Foundation, October 13, 2023.
- Fund visited KDIC Fund of Guarantee Citizens' Deposits in Banks Republic of Uzbekistan, November 6, 2023.
- International Association of Deposit Insurers - Asia-Pacific Regional Committee Workshop: "Enhancing the role of deposit insurers in early detection and timely intervention" Deposit Insurance of Vietnam, November 10, 2023.
- The goal is depositor protection and system health Dai Bieu Nhan Dan, November 10, 2023.
- Enhance the role of deposit insurance in early detection and timely intervention Quichoi TV, November 10, 2023.
- Strengthening Insurance Supervision, OJK Collaborates with Two Korean Institutions Otoritas Jasa Keuangan, December 7, 2023.
- KDIC chief vows to strengthen crisis response monitoring system TheKoreaTimes, December 8, 2023.
- KDIC Declares Responsibility Management to Establish Internal Controls and Compliance Regime Global News Network, December 21, 2023.
- Meeting was held with the Korea Deposit Insurance Corporation Representatives Financial Regulatory Commission, January 23, 2024.
- Dealing with misdirected wire transfers TheKoreaTimes, February 23, 2024.
- KDIC signs agreement with Chungju City for regional development. June 14, 2024.
- KDIC held a Meeting with the Eastern Europe Stock Exchange June 19, 2024.
- KDIC launches support program for Sakhalin Koreans in collaboration with Korea Money Brokerage Corporation. June 19, 2024.
- Workshop on the Law on Deposit Insurance - Experience of Korea Deposit Insurance Corporation Deposit Insurance of Vietnam, July 9, 2024.
- Deposit Insurance of Vietnam co-organizes the 2024 Vietnam International Conference in Finance Deposit Insurance of Vietnam, July 12, 2024.
- KDIC Held a Meeting with the Indonesia Deposit Insurance Corporation September 9, 2024.
- KDIC Renewed the MOU with DICoM and Attended a Ger Gifting Ceremony Held in KDIC Global Academy, Chungju September 10, 2024.
- The Council for Economic Education Organizations signs MOU with the Ministry of Education and KDIC to promote economic education. September 11, 2024.
- KDIC allocates 30 million KRW to launch a support program for Sakhalin Koreans. September 12, 2024.
- Memorandum of Understanding Renewed with the Korea Deposit Insurance Corporation Deposit Insurance Corporation of Mongolia, September 12, 2024.
- KDIC Held a Meeting with the Asian Development Bank and the Deposit and Savings Insurance Fund of Tajikistan September 24, 2024.
- KDIC signs business agreement with Korea SMEs and Startups Agency to promote mutual growth with local communities. September 30, 2024.
- Tajik Delegation Participates in Study Tour to Korea Deposits and Savings Insurance Fund of Tajikistan, October 4, 2024.
- KDIC, Elected as First Vice Chair of IFIGS October 21, 2024.
- The Bank Guarantee Fund Signs MoU with the Korea Deposit Insurance Corporation (KDIC) Bankowy Fundusz Gwarancyjny (BFG), November 12, 2024.
- KDIC Joining Hands with Polish Counterpart Korea News Plus, November 13, 2024.
- Japan Financial Service Agency: Exchange Of Letters On Cooperation In The Area Of Banking Resolution With The Korea Deposit Insurance Corporation (KDIC) Mondo Visione, November 13, 2024.
- Yoo Jae-hoon, president of Korea Deposit Insurance Corporation, expressed his intention to work hard on concrete work following the increase of the deposit protection limit of 100 million won MAEIL BUSINESS NEWSPAPER, November 18, 2024.
- KDIC held high-level meetings to support the introduction and improvement of deposit insurance systems in Laos and Cambodia, and signs an MOU with Cambodia’s Ministry of Land Management. November 19, 2024.
- The Korea Deposit Insurance Corporation announced on the 20th that it held the "12th Savings Bank Risk Management Strategy Workshop" to find a healthy growth direction for savings banks MAEIL BUSINESS NEWSPAPER, November 20, 2024.
- NBC, Korea Deposit Insurance Corporation Commit to Further Cooperation Khmer Times, November 22, 2024.
- KDIC held a meeting with the delegation from the Vietnam Deposit Insurance. November 26, 2024.
- KDIC Conducts Mock Resolution Exercise to Ensure Plan Works Smoothly News World, December 26, 2024.
- KDIC to Strengthen Crisis Response System Amid Growing Uncertainty and Volatility News World, February 2, 2025.
- KDIC Signs MOU with Japan Investor Protection Fund to Strengthen Bilateral Cooperation March 21, 2025.
- Deposit Protection Raised to 100 Million Won from Today... The Asia Business Daily, September 1, 2025.
