= Ryu Seong-hyeon =

North Korean soldier

- Born: Ryu Seong-hyeon; 1994 or 1996; Kangwon Province, North Korea
- Other name: Ryu Seong-hyun
- Occupation: Human rights activist
- Years active: 2020 - present

Ryu Seong-hyeon (Korean: 류성현) is a North Korean defector and former soldier who gained international attention after his rare defection across the Demilitarized Zone (DMZ) to South Korea in 2019. He is known for his advocacy for human rights and Korean unification, and he serves as a media commentator on North Korean military affairs.

== Early life and Military Service ==
Ryu was born in Kangwon Province, near the inter-Korean border in North Korea. As a teenager, he found a South Korean propaganda leaflet which claimed the North had started the Korean War, contradicting official North Korean history. This incident planted a "seed of doubt" about the regime's narratives and motivated him to seek a life in South Korea.

He served for seven years as a driver in the North Korean air force in South Hamgyong Province. During his service, he endured severe living conditions, including poor food (eating mushy rice mixed with corn and rarely having meat) and physically demanding labor. He later stated that at the time, he would have even volunteered to go to war in Ukraine if it meant better food.

== Defection to South Korea ==
In 2019, Ryu made a rare and dangerous defection by running across the heavily fortified and mine-riddled DMZ. He successfully crossed the border despite coming under fire from North Korean troops; he later recalled hearing twelve bullets pass just a meter over his head.

Upon his defection, he weighed only around 110 lbs due to malnutrition, a condition common among North Korean soldiers.

== Life in South Korea and Activism ==
After arriving in South Korea, Ryu adapted to his new life and became a university student. He became involved in advocacy work, promoting human rights and a unified Korea through organizations like the Global Peace Foundation.

Ryu has become a prominent media commentator, providing insights into the lives and mindsets of average North Korean soldiers to international outlets, including the BBC, ABC News, and the Wall Street Journal.

== Russia-Ukraine War ==
Ryu gained significant attention in late 2024 and early 2025 for his analysis of the deployment of North Korean troops to the Russian frontlines in Ukraine. He has stated that North Korean soldiers are told their families will face execution if they are captured alive, leading many to prefer suicide over surrender.

He has described the North Korean soldiers sent to Russia as "cannon fodder" who are often young, underfed, and cut off from the outside world. He confirmed the authenticity of a diary found on a deceased North Korean soldier by Ukrainian forces, identifying the handwriting and phrasing as distinctly North Korean.
