= Yoo Hyeong-jong =

South Korean footballer

Yoo Hyeong-Jong
Personal information
- Full name: Yoo Hyeong-Jong (유형종)
- Date of birth: December 6, 1985 (age 40)
- Height: 1.80 m (5 ft 11 in)
- Position: Forward

Youth career
- 2004–2006: Beijing High School

Senior career*
Years	Team	Apps	(Gls)
2007	Yangju		
2008	Sportakademklub	3	(0)
- * Club domestic league appearances and goals as of 1 January 2009

Yoo Hyeong-Jong (born December 6, 1985; Korean: 유형종) is a South Korean football forward. He is currently a free agent.

== Career ==
In 2007 Yoo Hyeong-Jong played for Yangju FC in the South Korean amateur K3 League. He spent the 2008 season in Sportakademklub of Russian First Division.
