= Yu Ch'adal =

Goryeo official (880 – ?)

- Hangul: 유차달
- Hanja: 柳車達
- RR: Yu Chadal
- MR: Yu Ch'adal

Yu Ch'adal (Korean: 유차달; Hanja: 柳車達), also known as Ryu Ch'adal (류차달) is the founder of the Korean Munhwa Yu clan. He was born in 28 August, 880AD by the lunar calendar and was named the lord (호족) of Munhwa. He supported Wang Kŏn by supplying Wang's armies with military carts. He was given the third-grade rank post of chief assistant executive, or daeseung (대승) and awarded Three-Han Unification Merit Subject (삼한공신) by King Taejo Wang Kon of the Goryeo Dynasty for his help in unifying the Korean Peninsula. In January 2011, North Korea claimed to have found Yu's tomb in Samchon County.

Yu Ch'adal only had one son who was called Yu Hyo-gŭm (유효금) and one grandson who was called Yu Kŭm-hwan (유금환).There are some stories that tell he was one of or a son of one of the people moving into Goryeo after the fall of the kingdom of Balhae in the north to Khitan invaders from the Liao dynasty. Others say he was a descendant of a noble of Shilla who ran away after a failed rebellion.
