= Pyongyang Kim clan =

Korean clan from northern Korea

Pyongyang Kim clan 평양 김씨
- Country: Goryeo, Joseon
- Current region: North Korea
- Origin: Pyongyang or South Pyongan
- Founded: mid-10th century – 1411 CE
- Founder: Kim Taejin or Kim Yŏha

The Pyongyang Kim clan (Korean: 평양 김씨; Hanja: 平壤金氏) is a Korean clan originating from what is now Pyongyang, North Korea. It is believed that Kim Taejin (김대진; 金大振), a descendant of Gyeongsun of Silla, was its founder. However, the family records of the Joseon dynasty, cite Kim Yŏha (김여하; 金慮遐), an early Joseon noble who served as governor of a county during the reign of King Taejong, as the clan's founder, allegedly having done so during the early 15th century. The most-recent record of the clan dates back to the 1930s and states that modern members of the clan live around Chorwon County, Kangwon-do, North Korea.

== See also ==
- Kim (Korean surname)
- List of Korean surnames
