= Noble Consort Zhaoxian =

Noble Consort Zhaoxian 昭獻貴妃
- Born: Unknown; Suzhou Prefecture, South Zhili (present day Suzhou, Jiangsu Province)
- Died: 1420; Yongle 18 (永樂十八年); Beijing
- Spouse: Yongle Emperor
Posthumous name
- Zhaoxian (昭獻)
- Clan: Wang (王)

Noble Consort Zhaoxian (14th century – 1420), of the Wang clan, was a consort of the Yongle Emperor.

She became a member of the imperial harem of the Yongle Emperor in 1409. She was described as humble and mild. She played an important role in court because of her influence. The emperor respected her and she was known to have the ability to calm him down during his frequent anger attacks. Because of this, the members of the court, both princes, princesses and other people at court, regarded her as a form of protection against the emperor.

== Titles ==
- During the reign of the Hongwu Emperor (r. 1368–1398):
  - Lady Wang (王氏)
- During the reign of the Yongle Emperor (r. 1402–1424):
  - Zhaorong (昭容; from 1409)
  - Noble Consort (貴妃; from unknown date)
  - Noble Consort Zhaoxian (昭獻貴妃; from 1420)
