= Yoo Juhyun =

South Korean novelist (1921–1982)

Yoo Juhyun (Korean: 유주현; 1921–1982) was a South Korean novelist. He was a prolific writer, having written 26 full-length novels and over 100 novellas and short stories. His early works were mostly devoted to social issues, but the majority of his works since the 1960s are historical novels. Unlike conventional historical novels that focus on entertainment, his novels feature profound historical perspectives. His representative work Joseonchongdokbu (조선총독부 Joseon Government-General) (1964–1967) has received critical attention for its realistic depiction of the Korean people’s sufferings during the 36 years of Japanese colonial rule.

== Biography ==
Yoo was born in 1921. At the age of 15, he moved to Seoul all by himself without any specific goals other than making money. There, he came across his sixth-grade homeroom teacher, who helped him dream of becoming a writer. The teacher landed him a job at a business run by one of his relatives, praising Yoo’s writing capability. In particular, Yoo’s teacher encouraged him by saying that he would someday become a literary great like Yi Kwang-su, which Yoo kept in his heart. In February 1939, he moved to Tokyo, Japan, where he attended the Liberal Arts Department of Waseda University.

After returning from Japan, he began writing novels while working as a schoolteacher. He made his formal literary debut on October 1, 1948, by publishing “Beonyoui geori” (번요의 거리 Bustling Streets). In 1950, as soon as he published “Gunsang” (군상 The Crowd), the Korean War broke out. When South Korean forces recaptured Seoul, Yoo became an editor for the Education and Information Division of the Ministry of National Defense. Afterward, he relocated to Daegu and became a member of the Republic of Korea Air Force Military Writers Corps, where he began his literary activities in earnest.

For two decades, from 1952 to 1973, he served as an editor for the Sintaeyang magazine. In 1954, he returned to his family in Seoul. Here, he produced a number of works, including “Taeyangui yusan” (태양의 유산 The Heritage of the Sun) (1958) and received an Asian Liberation Literary Award (아세아자유문학상) (1958). He continued to pursue his literary ambition actively and was awarded numerous prizes, including a Korea Book Award (1968) and a Korea Culture and Art Award (1976). In 1970, he became a member of the Central Committee for the Korean Chapter of the International P.E.N. Club and a board member of the Korean Writers’ Association. In 1974, he was appointed as the first chairman of the Korean Novelists’ Association. Later he suffered from spinal fractures. On May 26, 1982, he died due to osteomyelitis and other complications.

== Writings ==
=== Early works ===
Yoo Juhyun published his first novel in the late 1940s. Until the 1950s, his novelistic themes revolved around the gap between “I” and society. His early works are mostly short stories. Their settings are either the ruined reality of the postwar world or the absurd and insecure society. In particular, in his autobiographical debut novel “Beonyoui geori,” the main character Hyeong-sik moonlights as a book seller to earn his tuition fees and living expenses. At one point in the novel, a female college student, whom Hyeong-sik has feelings for, gives alms to the poor, in fact, to avoid getting bad luck. This story is the author’s satire of hollow humans seeking their own good fortune. In this respect, Yoo’s novels from this period focus, as a crucial theme, on the imbalance of human existence caused by social absurdity and insecurity.

=== Middle works ===
The second term of his literary career is thought to have begun with the publication of “Jangssi Ilga” (장씨 일가 The Jang Family). In this short story, the author fiercely criticizes the corrupt and depraved society through a father, a member of the National Assembly during the later days of the rule of the Liberation Party, and his son, a colonel in the reserve. During this period, he also began writing full-length novels in earnest. One representative work is Joseonchongdokbu (1964–1967), an epic novel set during the Japanese colonial period, which provides an accurate description of history while shedding light on the history of Korea in a three-dimensional way through the appearance of more than 2,000 characters. This epic novel realistically depicts the tyranny and exploitation of the Japanese colonial rule, by focusing on the Residency-General and Government-General, two organizations set up by the Japanese for colonial aggression. Furthermore, the work reveals the fierce struggles of Korean independence fighters and the horrible everyday reality of Koreans. A representative work of Yoo Juhyun, Joseonchongdokbu has received positive critical reviews.

=== Later works ===
After the 1970s, the literary world of Yoo Juhyun undergoes transformation to contemplate the destiny of “I” from a truth-seeker’s perspective. The focus of his later works shifts from the attention to the external, represented by social and historical consciousness, to the internal world of an individual, the fantastic and the mysterious, death and afterlife. Among these works, “Sinui nunchori” (신의 눈초리 God’s Gaze) deals with a psychological conflict between a father, a former psychiatrist-turned stroke patient, and a son, a businessman who runs a wig export business. The novel thoroughly illustrates the internal volition of the father and the worldly conflict of the son who is obsessed with external desires. In this respect, the works listed in Jugeumi boineun angyeong (죽음이 보이는 안경 Glasses That Can See Death) (1977), which he wrote while fighting his illness, are a testament to his inquiry into the self in his later literary world.

== Works ==
=== Complete works and anthologies ===
- 《유주현전집1-10》, 신태양사, 1968~1970 / Yujuhyeonjeonjip (The Complete Works of Yu Juhyun Vol. 1-10), Sintaeyangsa, 1968–1970.
- 《유주현대표작선집1-2》, 경미문화사, 1978 / Yujuhyeondaepyojakseonjip (The Representative Works of Yu Juhyun Vol. 1-2), Gyeongmimunhwasa, 1978.
- 《유주현역사소설군대전집》, 양우사, 1983 / Yujuhyeonyeoksasoseolgundaejeonjip (The Complete Historical Novels of Yu Juhyun), Yangusa, 1983.

=== Anthologies ===
- 《자매계보》, 동화문화사, 1953 / Jamaegyebo (The Genealogy of the Sisters), Donghwamunhwasa, 1953.
- 《태양의 유산》, 장문사, 1958 /Taeyangui yusan (The Heritage of the Sun), Jangmunsa, 1958.
- 《장미부인》, 민음사, 1967 / Jangmibuin (Mrs. Rose), Minumsa, 1967.
- 《남한산성》, 삼중당, 1975 / Namhansanseong (Namhansanseong Fortress), Samjungdang, 1975.
- 《신의 눈초리》, 문리사, 1977 / Sinui nunchori (God’s Gaze), Mullisa, 1977.
- 《장씨일가》, 범우사, 1977 / Jangssi Ilga (The Jang Family), Beomusa, 1977.
- 《죽음이 보이는 안경》, 문학사상, 1978 / Jugeumi boineun angyeong (Glasses That Can See Death), Monthly Literature & Thought, 1978.
- 《희한한 신부들》, 문예창작사, 1978 / Huihanhan sinbudeul (The Weird Brides), Munyechangjaksa, 1978.
- 《언덕을 향하여》, 경미문화사, 1979 / Eondeogeul hyanghayeo (Toward the Hill), Gyeongmimunhwasa, 1979.
- 《끊어진 다리》, 민중서적, 1983 / Kkeuneojin dari (The Broken Bridge), Minjungseojeok, 1983

=== Novels ===
- 《바람 지옥문을 열라》, 장문사, 1958 / Baram jiongmuneul yeolla (Wind! Open the Gate to Hell), Jangmunsa, 1958.
- 《조선총독부》, 신태양사, 1967[10] / Joseonchongdokbu (Joseon Government-General), Sintaeyangsa, 1967.
- 《대원군》, 보음출판사, 1966 / Daewongun (The Grand Prince), Boeum, 1966.
- 《하오의 연가》, 삼중당, 1968 /Haoui yeonga (The Love Song in the Afternoon), Samjungdang, 1968.
- 《신부들》, 국민문고사, 1969 / Sinbudeul (The Brides), Gungminmungosa, 1969.
- 《백조 산으로》, 삼성출판사, 1972 / Baekjo saneuro (The Swan Flies to the Mountain), Samseong, 1972.
- 《통곡》, 신태양사, 1972 / Tonggok (Wail), Sintaeyangsa, 1972.
- 《군학도》, 신태양사, 1972 / Gunhakdo (The Picture of a Flock of Cranes), Sintaeyangsa, 1972.
- 《황녀》, 동화출판공사, 1972 / Hwangnyeo (The Imperial Princess), Donghwa, 1972.
- 《우수의 성》, 문리사, 1976 / Usuui seong (The Gloomy Castle), Mullisa, 1976.
- 《파천무》, 신태양사, 1976 / Pacheonmu (Dance Toward the Broken Heavens), Sintaeyangsa, 1976.
- 《고요한 종말》, 태창문화사, 1977 / Goyohan jongmal (The Quiet Ending), Taechangmunhwasa, 1977.
- 《강 건너 정인들》, 경미문화사, 1978 / Gang geonneo jeongindeul (Lovers Across the River), Gyeongmimunhwasa, 1978.
- 《황진이》, 범서출판사, 1978 / Hwangjini (Hwang Jin-yi), Beomseo, 1978.
- 《풍운》, 한국방송사업단, 1982 / Pungun (Winds and Clouds), Korea Broadcasting Business Group, 1982.
- 《북국설》, 고려원, 1987 / Bukgukseol (Snow in the North Country), Goryeowon, 1987.
- 《수양대군》, 신원문화사, 1993 / Suyangdaegun (Grand Prince Suyang), Sinwonmunhwasa, 1993.

=== Essay collections ===
- 《지성의 문》, 신태양사, 1960 / Jiseongui mun (The Gate to Intelligence), Sintaeyangsa, 1960.
- 《정 그리고 지》, 문예창작사, 1978 / Jeong geurigo ji (Affection and Understanding), Munyeochangjaksa, 1978.

=== Works in translation ===
- 《조선총독부》, 신태양사, 1967 / 朝鮮総督府, 徳間書店, 1968
- 柳周鉉, 現代韓国文学選集 : 第4卷. 短篇小説, 冬樹社, 1974. (공편)
- 《장미부인》, 민음사, 1967 / 薔薇夫人, 上海译文出版社, 1991
- Ju-hyŏn Yu, Postwar Korean short stories, Seoul National University Press & The Center for Korean Studies at the University of Hawaii, 1983. (전후한국단편소설선) (공편)

== Awards ==
- Asian Liberation Literary Award (아시아자유문학상) (1958)
- Korea Book Award (1968)
- Korea Culture and Art Award (1976)
