= Prince Jeongwon =

Korean Joseon prince (1580–1619)

Wonjong of Joseon 조선 원종 朝鲜 元宗
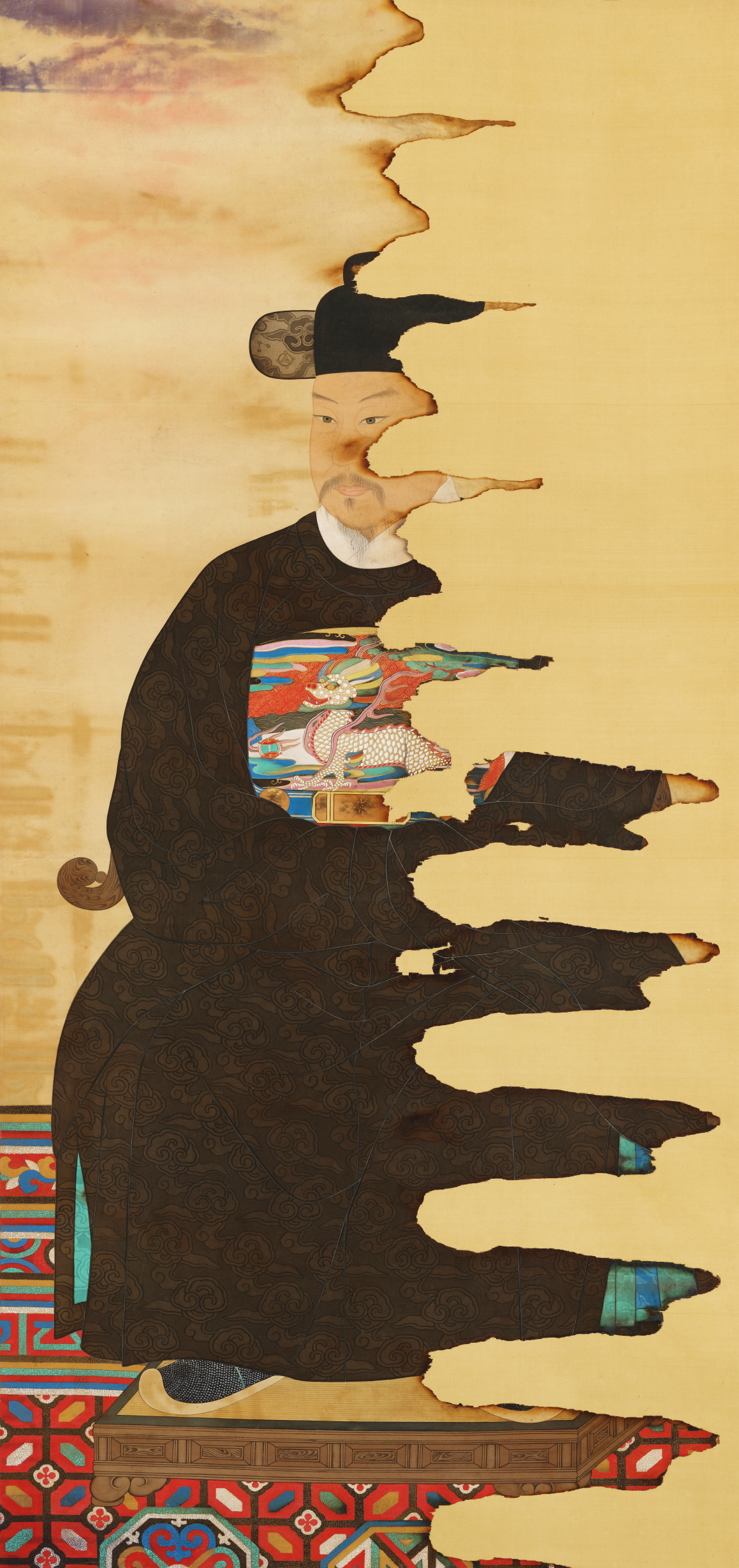
- Portrait of Prince Jeongwon, damaged during the 1954 Busan Yongdusan fires
- Born: 2 August 1580; Byeol Hall, Gyeongbokgung, Hanseong, Joseon
- Died: 2 February 1619 (aged 38); Hoehyeonbang, Hanseong, Joseon
- Burial: Jangreung
- Spouse: Queen Inheon of the Neungseong Gu clan
- Issue: Yi Ho, Prince Neungyang; Yi Myeong, Prince Neungpung; Yi Bo, Prince Neungwon; Yi Jeon, Prince Neungchang
Posthumous name
- King Gongnyang Gyeongdeok Inheon Jeongmok Janghyo the Great 공량경덕인헌정목장효대왕 恭良敬德仁憲靖穆章孝大王
Temple name
- Wonjong 원종 元宗
- House: Jeonju Yi
- Father: Seonjo of Joseon
- Mother: Royal Noble Consort In of the Suwon Kim clan

Wonjong of Joseon or Prince Jeongwon (2 August 1580 – 2 February 1619) was a prince during the Joseon dynasty. He was a son by a concubine to the Joseon dynasty's 14th monarch, king Seonjo, and half brother of king Gwanghaegun and father of king Injo. His birth name was Yi Bu (이부; 李琈).

He first held the title of Prince Jeongwon (定遠君, 정원군) and later re-titled as Grand Internal Prince Jeongwon (定遠大院君, 정원대원군). In 1592, during the Japanese invasions of Korea, he escaped with his father, King Seonjo and awarded in 1604 in recognition of helping the king to escape.

== Family ==
- Father: King Seonjo of Joseon (조선 선조; 26 November 1552 – 16 March 1608)
  - Grandfather: Yi Cho, Grand Internal Prince Deokheung (이초 덕흥대원군; 2 April 1530 – 14 June 1559)
  - Grandmother: Grand Internal Princess Consort Hadong of the Hadong Jeong clan (하동부대부인 정씨; 23 September 1522 – 24 June 1567)
- Mother: Royal Noble Consort In of the Suwon Kim clan (인빈 김씨; 1555–1613)
  - Grandfather : Kim Han-U (김한우; 1501–1577)
  - Grandmother: Lady Yi of the Jeonju Yi clan (전주 이씨)
- Siblings
  - Older brother – Yi Seong, Prince Uian (의안군 성; 1577 – 20 March 1588)
  - Older brother – Yi Hu, Prince Shinseong (신성군 후; 6 January 1579 – 8 December 1592)
  - Younger sister – Princess Jeongshin (정신옹주; 1582/1583–1653)
  - Younger sister – Princess Jeonghye (정혜옹주; 1584–1638)
  - Younger sister – Princess Jeongsuk (정숙옹주; 19 March 1587 – 5 November 1627)
  - Younger brother – Yi Gwang, Prince Uichang (의창군 광; January 1589 – 15 October 1645)
  - Younger sister – Princess Jeongan (정안옹주; 1590–1660)
  - Younger sister – Princess Jeonghui (정휘옹주; 1593–1653)
- Consorts and their Respective Issue(s):
1. Queen Inheon of the Neungseong Gu clan (인헌왕후 구씨; 17 April 1578 – 14 January 1626)
  1. Yi Jong, Grand Prince Neungyang (이종 능양대군; 7 December 1595 – 17 June 1649)
  2. Yi Bo, Grand Prince Neungwon (이보 능원대군; 15 May 1598 – 26 January 1656)
  3. Yi Jeon, Grand Prince Neungchang (이전 능창대군; 16 July 1599 – 17 November 1615)
2. Lady Kim of the Pyeongyang Kim clan (평양 김씨)
  1. Yi Myeong, Prince Neungpung (이명 능풍군; 1596 – November 1604)

== Popular culture ==
- Portrayed by Lee Jae-yun in the 1995 KBS2 TV Series West Palace.
- Portrayed by Jang Seung-jo in the 2015 MBC TV series Splendid Politics.

== See also ==
- History of Korea
- Rulers of Korea
