= Yonan Kim clan =

Korean clan from Yonan, Hwanghae Province

Yeonan Kim clan 연안 김씨 延安 金氏 Yŏnan Kim clan^{MR}｜Yeonan Gim clan^{RR}
- Korean clan
- Parent family: House of Kim of Silla (Gyeongju Kim clan)
- Country: Korea
- Current region: North & South Korea
- Etymology: 연안 refers to the founder's place of origin, where the founder and ancestors before him resided; 김 is the surname; and 씨 denotes a lineage descended from a specific ancestor.
- Origin: Yŏmju, Ansŏ Grand prefecture, Sŏhae-do, Kingdom of Goryeo (now Yonan County, South Hwanghae Province, North Korea)
- Founded: 12^{th} century
- Founder: Kim Sŏmhan
- Current head: Kim Sakwon_{President}
- Titles: List: Queen Consort of Joseon (왕비; 王妃)_{Queen Inmok}; Queen Dowager of Joseon (왕대비; 王大妃)_{Queen Inmok (Queen Dowager Soseong)}; Grand Queen Dowager of Joseon (왕비; 大王大妃)_{Queen Inmok (Grand Queen Dawger Myeongryeol)}; Prince Consort (부마; 駙馬)_{Kim Hŭi (Prince Consort Yeonseong)}; Grand Princess Consort (부부인; 府夫人)_{Grand Princess Consort Yeonseong}; Princess Consort (군부인; 郡夫人)_{Princess Consort Yangwon, Kim Suk (Princess Consort Yeonwon)}; Internal Prince (부원군; 府院君)_{Kim Kam (Internal Prince Yeonchang), Kim Chenam (Internal Prince Yeonheung)}; Dynastic Foundation Merit Subject 개국공신; 開國功臣_{Lord Yeonseong, Kim Ro (Grade 3 Meritorious Subject)}; Merit Subject 정사공신; 定社功臣_{Lord Yeonseong, Kim Ro (Grade 2 Meritorious Subject)}; Merit Subject 정난공신; 靖難功臣_{Lord Yeonsan, Kim Hyosŏng (Grade 1 Meritorious Subject) Lord Yeonsan, Kim Ch'ŏŭi (Grade 3 Meritorious Subject)}; Merit Subject 정국공신; 靖國功臣_{Internal Prince Yeonchang, Kim Kam (Grade 2 Meritorious Subject)}; Merit Subject 호성공신; 扈聖功臣_{Lord Yeonyang, Kim Kyehan (Grade 3 Meritorious Subject)}; Posthumous Name (시호; 諡號)_{Duke Munjeong, Kim Chaji Duke Munik, Kim Yŏji Duke Jeongseon, Kim Ha}; Imperial Princess Consort_{Kim Suk (Princess Consort Imperial Ui)}; Deputy Prime Minister of Republic of Korea_{Kim Woun-gie (15^{th} Deputy Prime Minister and Minister of the Economic Planning Board of Republic of Korea)}
- Members: 93,382 (2015, South Korea)
- Connected members: Kim Allo, Queen Inmok, Kim Chung-up, Kim Dong-wan, Kim Hyun-joong
- Connected families: Gangneung Kim clan^{Disputed} Papyeong Kim clan^{Cognate}
- Motto: 숭조 • 돈목 • 계후^{Hangeul} 崇祖 • 敦睦 • 啓後^{Hanja} (Korean for 'Venerate the ancestors, Unite the kin, and Enlighten the descendants')
- Estates: List: Maegandang House, Yeonggwang(83-1, Donggan-gil 2-gil, Gunnam-myeon, Yeonggwang-gun, Jeollanam-do, Republic of Korea); Deoksan House, Yeongju(13-16, Subyeon-ro, Pyeongeun-myeon, Yeongju-si, Gyeongsangbuk-do, ROK) Goeheon House, Yeongju(381 Geumgwang-ri Pyeongeun-myeon, Yeongju-si, Gyeongsangbuk-do, ROK); Manchwidang House, Yeongju(165, Sinam-ri, Isan-myeon, Yeongju-si, Gyeongsangbuk-do, ROK)
- Properties: List: Yeonan Building(1668, Nambusunhwan-ro, Gwanak-gu, Seoul, Republic of Korea)_{Clan association hall}; Gyeonwonjae(34-3 Wangchungneunggok-gil, Gangha-myeon, Yangpyeong-gun, Gyeonggi-do, ROK)_{Clan Ancestral shrine}
- Cadet branches: Pyongyang Kim clan^{Disputed}
- Website: yeonkim.or.kr; yeonkimnews.or.kr
- Although variations such as 'Yonan Kim' or 'Yeonan Gim' exist due to different romanization systems, 'Yeonan Kim' is the most common and widely accepted spelling; while the ancestral seat, '연안', is transliterated as 'Yeonan', following the current standard in Republic of Korea, and the surname '김' is written as 'Kim' adhering to the established convention.

The Yonan Kim clan or Yeonan Kim clan (hangeul: 연안 김씨; hanja: 延安金氏) is a Korean clan, with the bon-gwan (ancestral seat) based in Yonan, Hwanghae Province, Korea.

== Origin ==
The founder of the clan was Kim Sŏm-han (김섬한; 金暹漢) who served as an Academician of the Four Portals College (사문박사; 四門博士; samun paksa) during the reign of King Myeongjong of Goryeo (r. 1170–1202). According to genealogical tradition, Kim Sŏm-han is believed to have been descended from Kim Al-chi (김알지; 金閼智), the progenitor of House of Kim of Silla. Tradition tells of two brothers, descendants of Al-chi, who remonstrated with the King regarding political affairs. Their directness incurred the King's displeasure, resulting in the older brother being exiled to Gangneung and the younger to Yeonan. The younger brother's lineage settled in Yeonan for generations, eventually producing Sŏm-han, the founder of the Yeonan Kim clan. While this legend leads some to believe that the Yeonan Kim and Gangneung Kim clans share a common fraternal origin, some remain skeptical due to a lack of documentary evidence.

== History ==
The clan rose to prominence since the early Joseon dynasty. The most influential individual from the Yeonan Kim clan during the period was Kim Allo (김안로; 金安老), who rose to the position of Left State Councillor (좌의정; 左議政; Chwaŭijŏng) during the reign of King Jungjong (중종; 中宗; Chungjong) and married his second son to the king's daughter, Princess Hyohye (효혜공주; 孝惠公主; Hyohye Kongju). During this period, Allo's third cousin, Kim Kŭnsa (김근사; 金謹思), rose to the position of Chief State Councillor (영의정; 領議政; Yŏngŭijŏng), and together with Allo, they held two of the three State Councillor positions (삼정승; 三政丞; Samjŏngsŭng). Since then, 'the Kim clan of Yeonan' came to be considered as a powerful gentry family. Another notable member of the clan was Queen Inmok (인목왕후; 仁穆王后; Inmok-Wanghu), the second queen consort of King Seonjo of Joseon (선조; 宣祖; Sŏnjo). She was later deposed as queen dowager, and her only son Grand Prince Yeongchang (영창대군; 永昌大君; Yŏngch'ang-taegun), her father Kim Je-nam (김제남; 金悌男), Duke Yeonheung (연흥부원군; 延興府院君; Yŏnhŭng-buwŏn'gun), her three brothers (Rae; 김래; 金琜, Kyu; 김규; 金珪 and Sŏn; 김선; 金瑄) and brother-in-law (심정세; 沈挺世; Shim Chŏng-se) were all killed, while her mother, Lady Gwangsan of Gwangju No clan (광산부부인 광주 노씨; 光山府夫人 光州 盧氏; Kwangsan-pubuin Kwangju No-ssi) was exiled to Jeju Island by her step-son, Gwanghaegun of Joseon (광해군; 光海君; Kwanghaegun). Until she was reinstated as queen dowager by King Injo of Joseon (인조; 仁祖; Injo), who succeeded Gwanghaegun, she was confined to Gyeongun Palace (경운궁; 慶運宮; Kyŏngun'gung) with her daughter Princess Jeongmyeong (정명공주; 貞明公主; Chŏngmyŏng kongju).

The 2015 South Korean census recorded 93,382 individuals who were members of the Yonan Kim clan.

== Royalty ==
- Queen Inmok (Inmok-Wanghu, 1584 – 1632), Queen Consort of King Seonjo of Joseon.
- Kim Chenam (1562 – 1613),Internal Prince Yeonheung (Yŏnhŭng-Puwŏngun), Royal Father-in-law of the King Seonjo of Joseon.
- Kim Hŭi (? – 1531), Prince Consort Yeonseong (Yŏnsŏng-wi), Consort of Princess Hyohye, the eldest daughter of the King Jungjong of Joseon.
- Royal Princess Consort Yangwon (Yangwŏn-Gunbuin, – ), Consort of Prince Ŭich'ang, tenth son of the Sejong the Great.
- Grand Princess Consort Yeonseong (Yŏnsŏng-Pubuin, – ), Consort of Grand Prince Yŏngŭng, the fifteenth son of the Sejong the Great.
- Kim Suk (1881 – 1964), Princess Consort Imperial Ui (Ŭich'in-Wangbi), Consort of Prince Imperial Ui, the fifth son of the Emperor Gojong of Korea.

== Members ==
- Kim Allo (1481 – 1537), Joseon scholar-official
- Kim Chung-up (1922 – 1988), South Korean architect
- Kim Deok-ju (1933 – 2023), South Korean justice, Chief Justice of the Supreme Court of Korea (1990 – 1993)
- Kim Sung-joo (born 1964), South Korean politician, former member of the National Assembly
- V. Narry Kim
- Kim Jung-nan
- Kim Do-ah
- Kim Hyun-joong

== See also ==
- Kim (Korean surname)
