= Munhwa Yoo clan =

Korean clan from Hwanghae Province

Munhwa Yoo clan Munhwa Ryu clan
- Country: Korea
- Current region: Sinchon County, South Hwanghae Province, North Korea
- Founder: Yu Ch'a-dal
- Website: moonhwaryu.co.kr

The Munhwa Yoo clan (Korean: 문화 유씨; Hanja: 文化 柳氏), also known as the Munhwa Ryu clan (Korean: 문화 류씨) (Note: The character 柳 can be read as both Yoo or Ryu.), is a Korean clan.

== Background ==
In the 2015 South Korean census, 237,314 individuals identified themselves as part of the Munhwa Yoo clan, and 90,313 individuals identified themselves as members of the Munhwa Ryu clan, with a combined total of 327,627 members.

Yu Ch'a-dal, the founder of Munhwa Yu Clan, was born in Yuju (儒州=文化縣), Hwanghae-do in North Korea. He was received the title of Daeseung (大丞) as a merit subject at the founding of Goryeo dynasty in the beginning of the 10th century. He supported Wang Kŏn by supplying Wang's armies with military carts.

The Munhwa Yoo clan has been referred to as one of the 4 great families during the Korea Dynasty and the 8 noble families during the Joseon Dynasty. Moreover, the family history books of the Munhwa Yu clan, Youngrakbo (永樂譜, 1423) and Gajeongbo (嘉靖譜, 1562), inaugurated a new standard of the genealogical records with the Andong Kwon (安東 權) Clan Seonghwa (成化譜, 1476) etc. in Korean gentries. Those are widely known as world-class literatures on genealogy research, regardless of East and West.

== Members ==
- Yu Ch'a-dal, founder
- Princess Munseong
- Grand Princess Consort Munhwa
- Yu Deuk-gong, Joseon scholar-official and historian
- Yu Gwan-sun, March 1st Movement / Korean Independence Activist
- Yu Chin-san, South Korean politician
- Yoo Jae-geon, South Korean politician
- Yoo Juhyun, South Korean novelist
- Lew Byong-hion, South Korean general
- Yu Hyeong-won, Joseon scholar-official

== See also ==
- Yoo (Korean name)
