= Neungseong Gu clan =

Korean clan from South Jeolla Province

- Country: Korea
- Current region: Hwasun County
- Founder: Gu Jon-yu
- Connected members: Queen Inheon; Koo Hye-sun; Goo Hara; Koo Jun-hoe -->
- Website: http://www.neungsungkoo.com/

The Neungseong Gu clan (Korean: 능성 구씨; Hanja: 綾城 具氏) is one of the Korean clans. Their Bon-gwan is in Hwasun County, South Jeolla Province. According to the research held in 2015, the number of Neungseong Gu clan's member was 174,161. Their founder was Gu Jon-yu who exiled himself to Goryeo with Zhu Jam, the great-grandchild of Zhu Xi, because in 1224 he feared for his physical safety when Song dynasty was on the verge of destruction by Mongolia. Gu Jon-yu was possibly of Chinese or Korean. The origin of Gu Jon-yu has been disputed.

== See also ==
- Korean clans of foreign origin
