= Yi Seok =

South Korean pretender to the throne (born 1941)

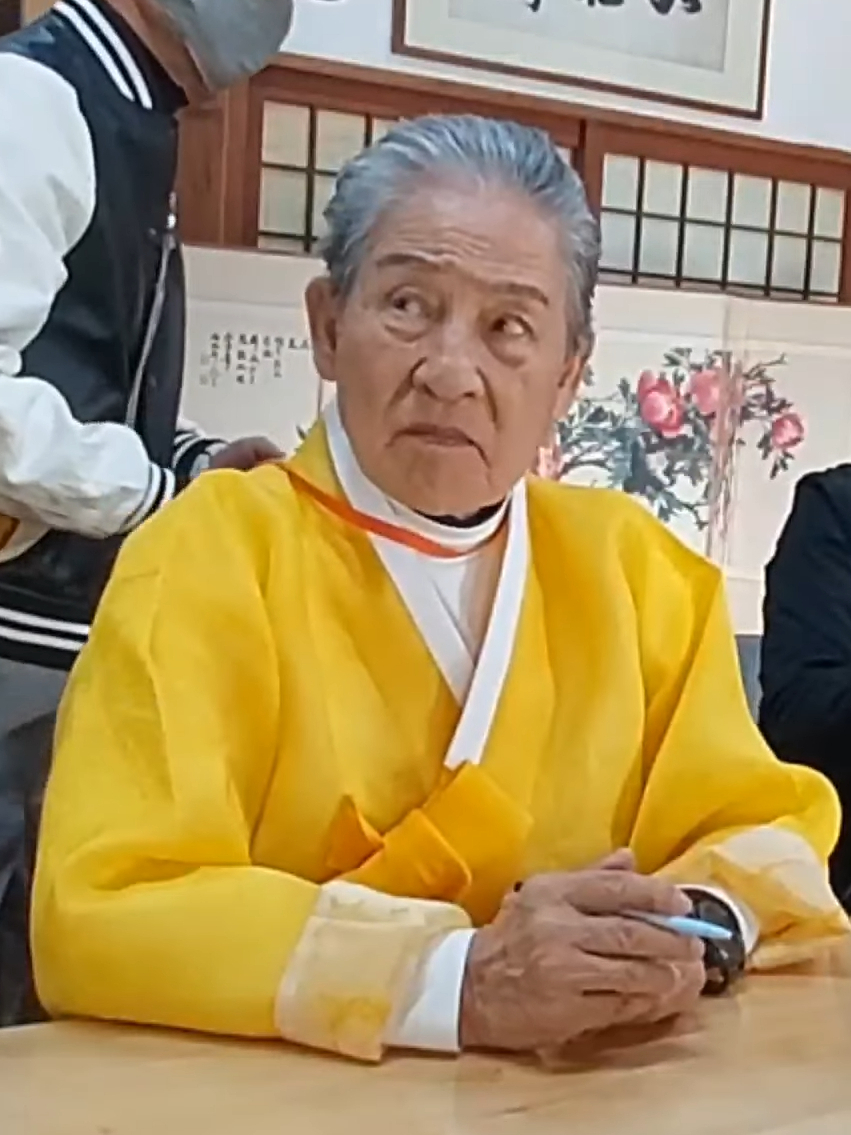
- Yi in 2021, a few days to about a month before transferring his claim as "head of the house"
- Predecessor: Yi Ku
- Successor: Andrew Lee
- Born: 30 August 1941 (age 85); Sadong Palace, Keijō, Korea, Empire of Japan
- Spouse: Dokko Jeonghui (divorced); Song Hui-yeong (divorced); Kyung Sook Lee
- Issue: Yi Hong; Yi Jin
- House: Yi
- Father: Yi Kang, Prince Imperial Ui
- Mother: Lady Hong Chŏng-sun
- Occupation: Professor of Jeonju University; Founding leader of the Imperial Cultural Foundation of Korea

Korean name
- Hangul: 이석
- Hanja: 李錫
- RR: I Seok
- MR: I Sŏk

Birth name
- Hangul: 이해석
- Hanja: 李海錫
- RR: I Haeseok
- MR: I Haesŏk

Yi Seok (Korean: 이석), anglicized as Paul Samuel Harrison Lee; born 3 August 1941) is a South Korean entrepreneur. He is a member of the House of Yi, the royal house of Joseon and Korean Empire. He is the 10th son of Prince Yi Kang, the fifth son of Emperor Gojong, and one of his concubines, Lady Hong Chŏng-sun.

Yi promotes the creation of a constitutional monarchy alongside the existing presidential system. In August 2006, Yi founded the Imperial Cultural Foundation of Korea (황실문화재단) to support this proposal. In his early life, he gained fame as a singer and he released a 1967 album Pigeon House. Since 2004, he has been employed by the city of Jeonju to promote tourism. He also serves as a professor of history at Jeonju University. Yi's guesthouse in the Jeonju Hanok Village has been visited by Presidents Roh Moo-hyun and Moon Jae-in.

== Early life ==
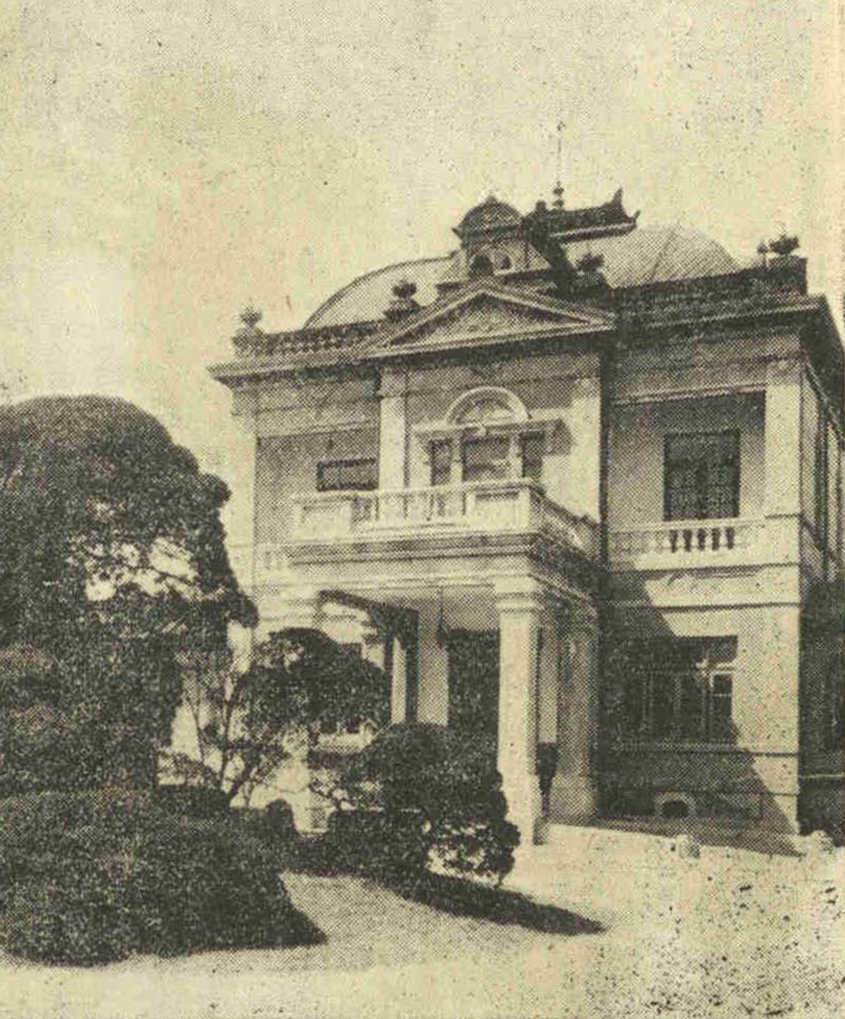
Sadong Palace in 1937

Yi was born Yi Hae-seok (이해석; 李海錫) on 30 August 1941. He was born in Sadong Palace, Keijō, Korea, Empire of Japan. His father, Prince Yi Kang, was 62 and his mother, former telephone operator Lady Hong Chŏng-sun, was 19. He was born the fifth son.

The family lost Sadong Palace after 1945. The subsequent rise of the First Republic of Korea also resulted in the confiscation of many of the family's other properties. After the outbreak of the Korean War, Yi and his family fled from their residence in Samcheong-dong and were reduced to poverty.

At the beginning of the era of South Korea, the Imperial family was banished from the Imperial palace. Their lives became better after the president Park Chung Hee gained power. When studying Hankook University of Foreign Studies in Seoul, Yi learned foreign languages, principally Spanish, and became fluent. He also studied foreign relations and history, to prepare for the diplomatic service. A series of coups d'état and civil discord made that impossible.

== Career ==
In his twenties during the 1960s, he used his musical talent to become a well-known singer and professional musician. He became known as the "Singing Prince". In 1967, he recorded the album Pigeon House. Later, Yi volunteered for the Korean military and served as an enlisted man in the Vietnam War. During the war, Yi was wounded and needed to return to Korea; around the same time, his mother died of stomach cancer. Yi was 26; severely depressed, he attempted suicide nine times.

After President Park was assassinated in 1979, the government's subsidy to the royal family was discontinued. Yi tried various jobs to support himself. In the 1980s he moved to the United States as an illegal immigrant, doing jobs including lawn mowing and cleaning swimming pools and buildings. At the same time he attempted to retrieve family properties seized by the republic. Under postwar Korean law, these are no longer able to be claimed.

=== Return to Korea ===
With the changing political climate in the early 1990s, Yi returned to Korea.

In April 2004, his eldest daughter Yi Hong performed for the first time in a singing show from SBS, and Yi Seok starred on stage with her as celebration.

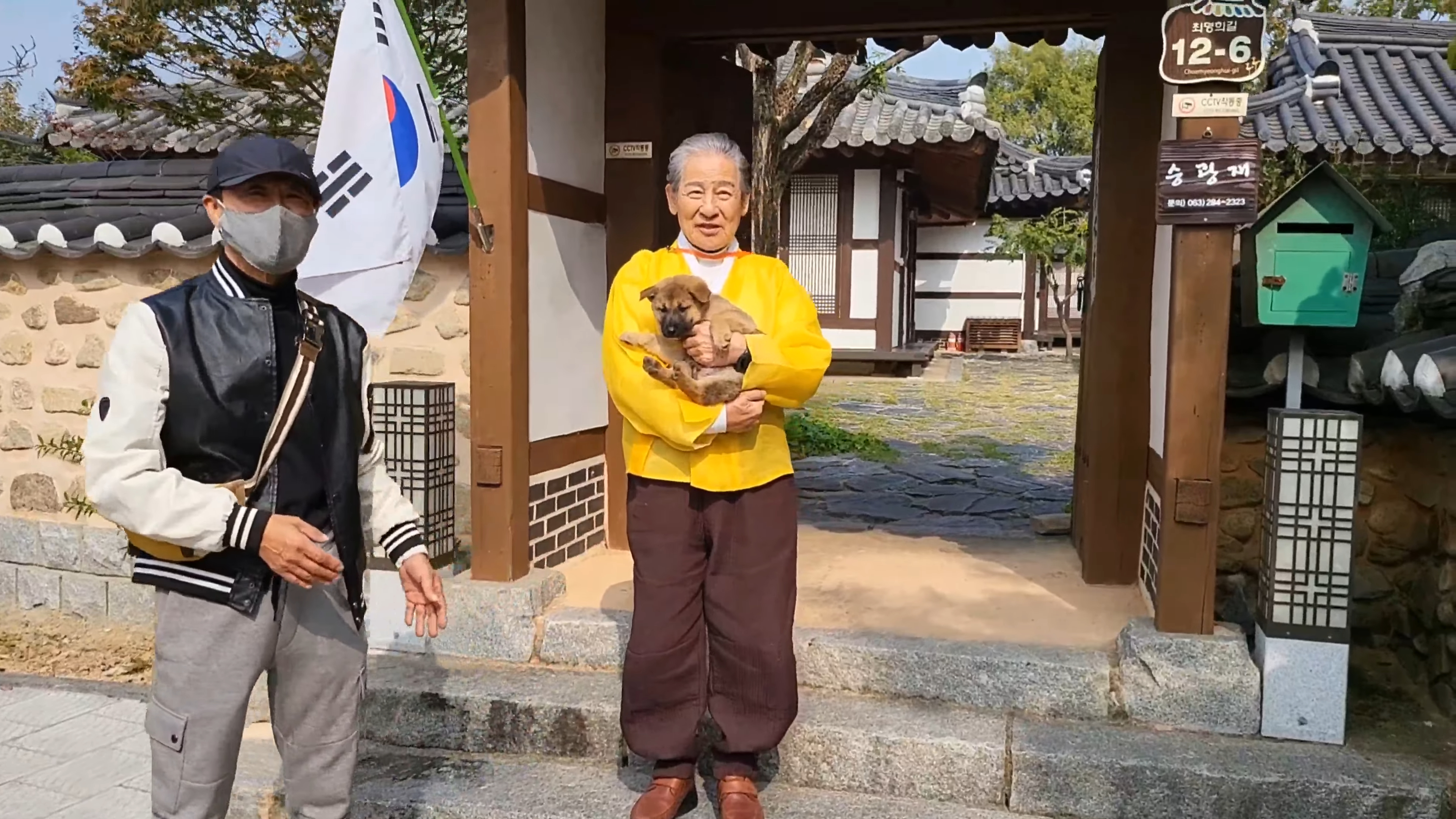
Yi holding a Jindo puppy at the entrance of Seunggwangjae in 2021

In August 2004, Yi started running and living in a guesthouse Seunggwangjae in Jeonju Hanok Village. (Note: 승광재; 承光齋 The name of the guesthouse is symbolic. "Seung" (승) means "succession", "Gwang" refers to the era name of his grandfather Gojong: "Gwangmu".) Seunggwangjae is sometimes rented by the government of Jeonju and it was built of wood, similar to the traditional way. Yi runs the place with his supporters. He said, "There are many things to do in Jeonju since this is where the Joseon dynasty founded. I'm going to spread the culture of the royal family and re-illuminate Jeonju's history." It has been visited by Presidents Roh Moo-hyun and Moon Jae-in. Other guests include Mayor of Seoul Park Won-soon and Ambassador Harry B. Harris Jr. In May 2016, Yi became the brand ambassador of Liancourt Rocks by Ulleung County.

On 16 July 2005, Yi Seok's cousin Yi Ku passed away without an heir. The Jeonju Lee Royal Family Association announced, on 22 July, that Yi Won would become Yi Ku's successor, according to his will. During the funeral, an angered Yi Seok commented that "the funeral is not yet ended, and it's inappropriate to discuss about adopting an heir by now". Later, Yi Seok claimed that "adopting a son after death doesn't make any sense," and he also claimed that Yi Bangja, his late aunt and the mother of Yi Ku, named him as "first successor" in her will.

Yi supports the creation of a constitutional monarchy for the symbolic value of having an Imperial Family. In 2016, Yi explained his rationale as follows:

Our country requires a system in which the royal family symbolically exists, even if there is already a president. (Note: Examples of elective republican governments with constitutional monarchies exist elsewhere. For instance, in Romania, the style of the former monarch, "His Majesty", is recognized by the government of the republic. Also, in Wallis and Futuna, a series of islands belonging to France, kingdoms still exist.) Only this way can put our people together. [...] For 100 years, the royalty has been absent, yet the five grand palaces are still there, and the descendants of the royalty should be the ones who live inside symbolically.

— Yi, Interview with the JoongAng Ilbo, 17 August 2016

To this end, in August 2006, he became the founding leader of the Imperial Culture Foundation of Korea (황실문화재단). Yi Hae-won, one of his elder half-sisters, proclaimed herself as an empress and held a coronation on 29 September 2006. Although she invited Yi Seok, he did not attend the ceremony.

The Statue of King Sejong in Gwanghwamun Plaza was erected on 9 October 2009, and Yi Seok attended the unveiling ceremony. According to a talk on 4 September 2014, Yi said that there is no existing contemporary portrait of Sejong the Great. The statue's face was based on that of Yi and a portrait of Grand Prince Hyoryeong, King Sejong's older brother, which is now preserved at Gwanaksan.

Yi also serves as a professor of history at Jeonju University.

On 7 August 2018, Harry B. Harris Jr., the United States Ambassador to South Korea, paid a visit to Seunggwangjae. The mayor of Jeonju, Kim Seung-su, said, "The prince [Yi] is our history and our spirit. I would like to express my deep gratitude to the ambassadors for visiting this symbolic space."

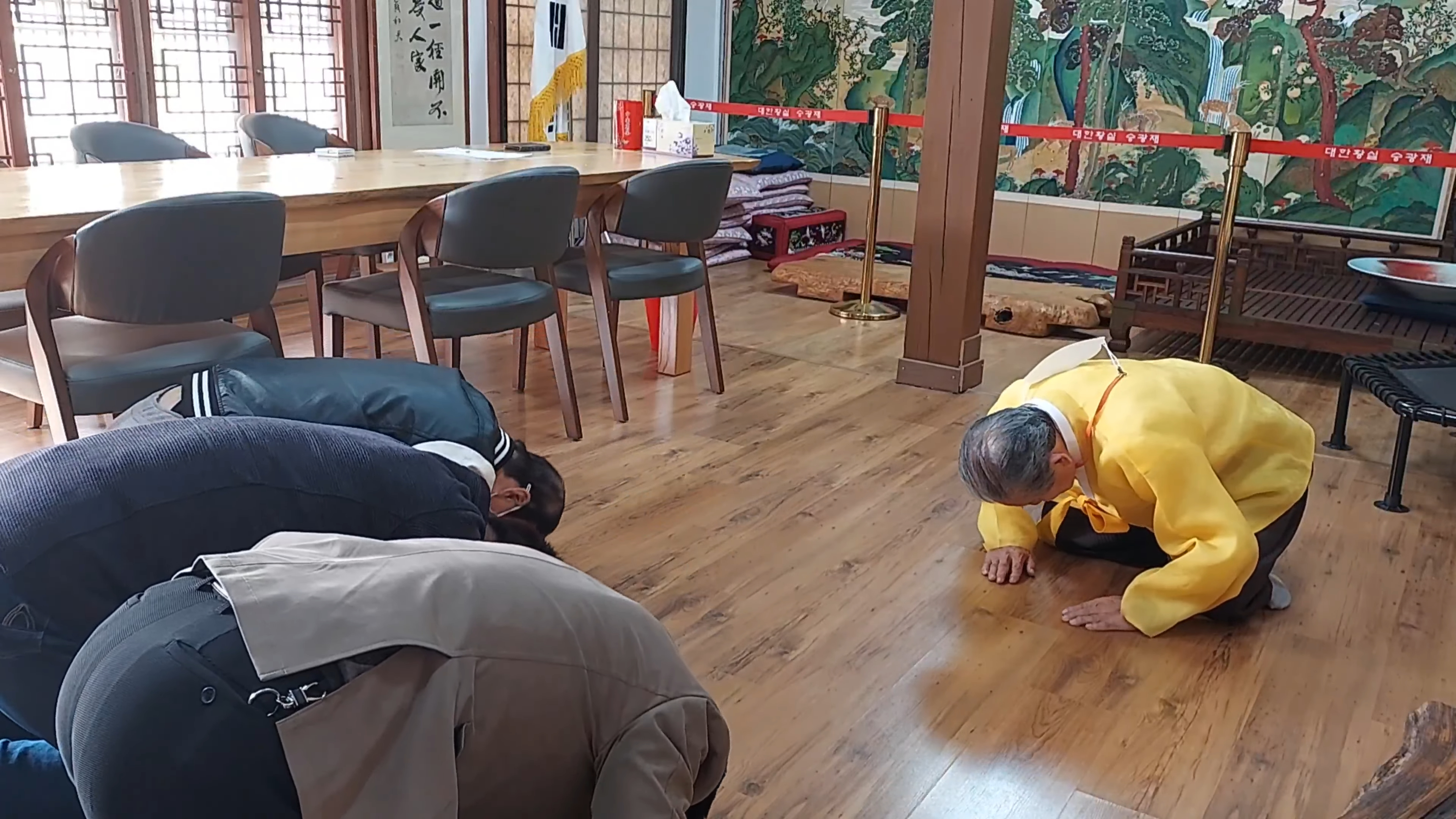
Yi reciprocating a kowtow to some guests

On 6 October 2018, Yi declared Andrew Lee, a distant Korean-American relative and an entrepreneur, to be the "Korean Crown Prince". It is unknown whether Lee has any significant blood relations to the Royal Family.

== Personal life ==
Yi married and divorced four times. He is now married to a woman said to be 18 years his junior. He has two daughters from his previous marriages:

- Yi Hong (이홍, born 1974): Previously worked as an actress in Korea. She married Han Yeong-gwang (한영광), another Korean actor. Their daughter was born in 2001.
- Yi Jin (이진, born 1979): Works on promoting traditional Korean ceramic arts. She resides in the United States.

== In popular culture ==
- In 1995, a four-part dramatization of his life story was featured in the KBS television series Screening Humanity.

== Notes ==
Yi Seok House of Yi Born: 3 August 1941
Titles in pretence
Preceded by Yi Ku	— TITULAR — Emperor of Korea; 16 July 2005 – 2021/2022; Reason for succession failure: Empire abolished in 1910	Succeeded by Andrew Lee
