= Yi Geon =

Korean prince (1909–1990)

Yi Geon; 이건
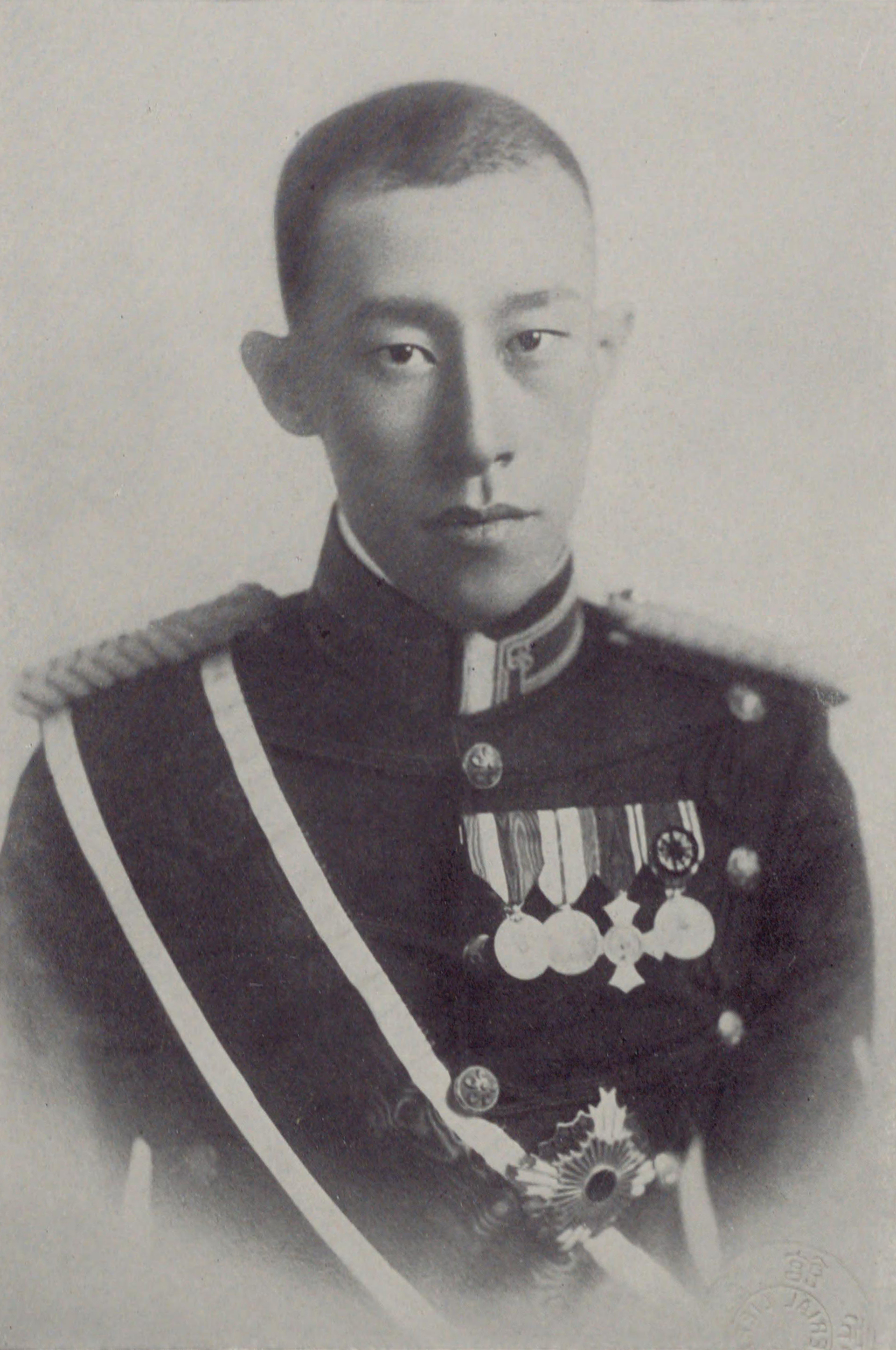
- In Imperial Japanese Army uniform, ca. 1937
- Born: 28 October 1909; Sadong Palace, Hanseong, Korean Empire
- Died: 21 December 1990 (aged 81); Yono, Saitama, Japan
- Spouse: Matsudaira Yoshiko (m. 1931; div. 1951) Maeda Yoshiko (m. 1952–1990)
- Issue: 1st marriage: 2 sons, 1 daughter 2nd marriage: 1 son
- House: House of Yi
- Father: Prince Imperial Ui
- Mother: Lady Jeong of the Sugwandang Hall
Military career
Allegiance	Empire of Japan
Service	Imperial Japanese Army
Years	1930–1945
Rank	Colonel
Commands	Instructor of horsemanship at the Imperial Military Academy
Awards	Order of the Paulownia Flowers; Order of the Sacred Treasure

Prince Yi Geon (October 28, 1909 – December 21, 1990), later known as Ken'ichi Momoyama (桃山 虔一), was a member of the Korean princely house under Japanese rule and a lieutenant colonel in the Imperial Japanese Army. He acquired Japanese nationality by naturalisation in 1955.

The first son of Prince Yi Kang of Korea by Lady Jeong, he was a grandson of Emperor Gwangmu. His Korean name was Yi Geon (이건, 李鍵), and his birth name was Yong-gil (용길).

== Biography ==
=== Early life ===
Yi Geon was born on October 28, 1909, at Sadong Palace in Gwaninbang, central Hanseong. He was the eldest, illegitimate, son of Yi Kang, Prince Uihwa with Lady Jeong of Sugwandang Hall. His mother was one of the many concubines his father had a relation with.

His birth name was Yong-gil (용길; 勇吉), but he changed his name to Geon (건; 鍵) on March 17, 1924.

According to the decree of Emperor Meiji promulgated at the time of the annexation of Korea in 1910, only eight people: Yi Hui, Gojong of Korea, Yi Cheok, Sunjong of Korea, Yun Jeung-sun, Empress Sunjeong, Yi Eun, King Yeongchin, Yi Kang, King Uichin, Kim Suk, Queen Uichin, Yi Jae-myeon, King Heungchin, and Queen Heungchin; were granted a new status as royal family members. The remaining members of the royal family were also granted a new status, but not grand as their relatives and it was not officially included in the decree.

He graduated from Gyeongseong Kindergarten in June 1916 and entered Ilchul Elementary School on April 6, 1917. That same year Yi Geon’s younger half-brother, Yi Woo, was adopted by Yi Jun-yong and succeeded him as head of that princely house. This created a situation where the younger brother was a part of the royal family but the older brother was not.

=== Life in Japan ===
He was brought to Japan in 1918, and entered Gakushūin Primary School. Another source says that in 1921, Yi Geon was sent to Japan under the pretext of studying abroad and entered the elementary school where he graduated from the school in March 1923.

Yi Geon was formally recognised as a member of the princely house under the Regulations of the Royal and Princely Houses in 1926. He was given the honorific title His Highness (전하; 殿下).

In April of the same year, he entered the Army Cadet School. According to Article 59 of the 《Wanggonggawebeom》 (王公家軌範), which was enacted and promulgated as Japanese Imperial Ordinance No. 17, on December 1, 1926, to regulate the imperial family of the Korean Empire after the annexation. It stated that it was mandatory for the king, crown prince, prince royal, and the duke to be commissioned as military attachés in the army or navy after reaching the age of 18.

Yi Geon entered the art department as a member of the 42nd class of the Japanese Military Academy.

His half-uncle, Yunghui of Korea, also died on April 25, 1926, as the last “emperor” of Korea. He was then enlisted to be Jongcheok jibsa (종척집사; 宗戚執事) and led the funeral ceremony. On May 5, he was permanently appointed the rank.

=== Prior to and During World War II ===
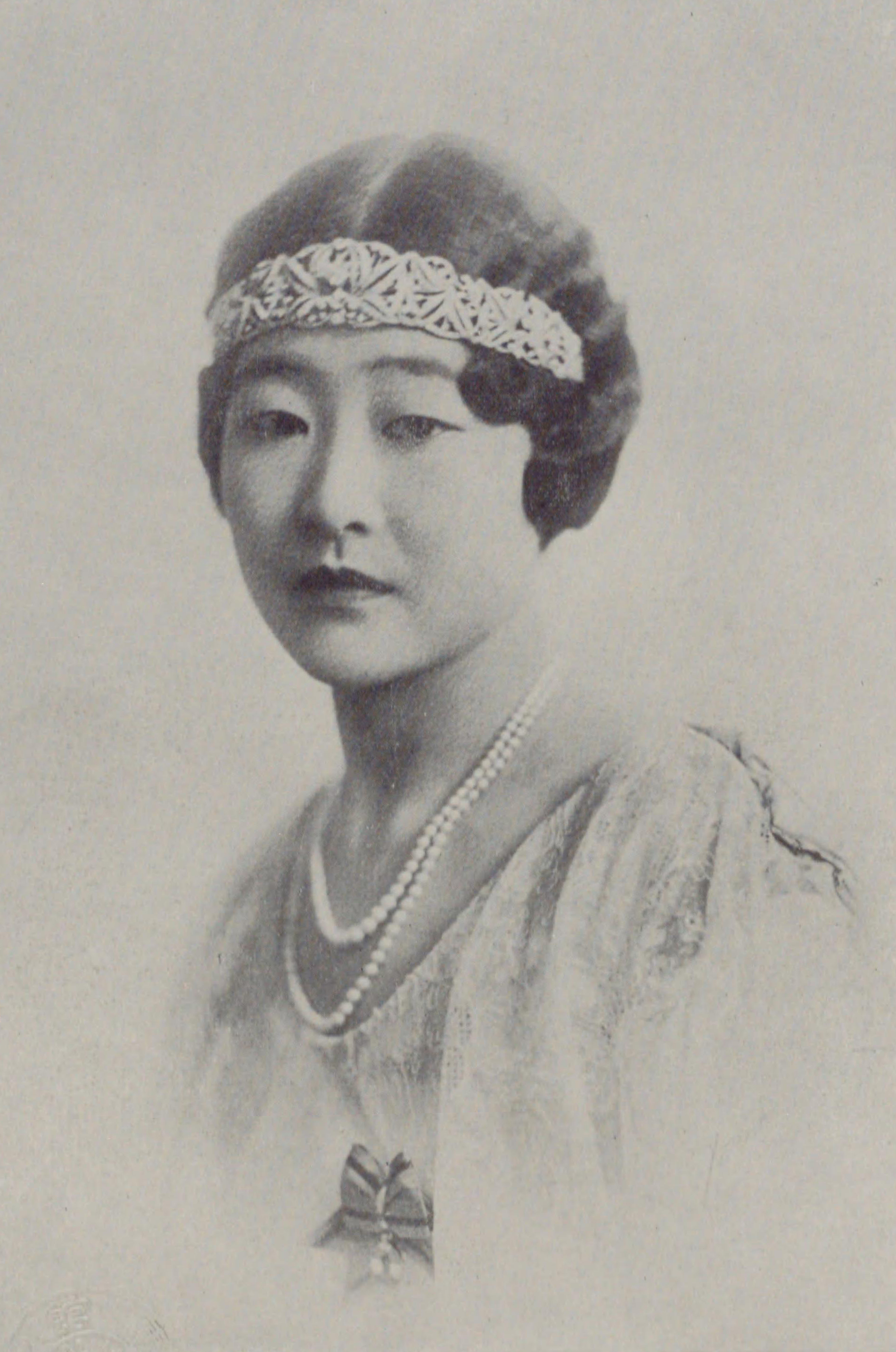
Yi Yoshiko (née Matsudaira), Yi Geon's first wife

On 12 June 1930, his father Yi Kang retired, and Yi Geon succeeded him as head of the princely house.

Yi Geon graduated the academy in July 1930.

He married Yoshiko Matsudaira, a maternal cousin of Princess Masako of Nashimoto and member of the Matsudaira clan, on October 5, 1931, in Tokyo. Yoshiko was a half-sister to Count Tadamitsu Hirohashi, a relative on her mother's side, and changed her name to Seiko Hirohashi. After she married Yi Geon, she was called Duchess Consort of Yi Geon, Yi Seiko (이건공비 이세이코; 李誠子).

On October 25, he was commissioned in the Imperial Japanese Army as a second lieutenant of cavalry, and was assigned to the Guards Cavalry Regiment.

Yi Geon was promoted to Lieutenant in 1932 and graduated from the Army Cavalry School in July 1933 where he was later promoted to cavalry lieutenant in August that same year.

He was soon appointed as an instructor at the Military Academy on March 15, 1935, and promoted to Captain on August 1, 1936. That same year on December 17th, Yi Geon entered the Army War College as its 51st student. On December 28, in connection with his admission to the College, Yi was transferred from being a horse riding instructor at the Military Academy to a member of the Guard Cavalry Regiment once again. Yi later graduated from the College on December 8, 1938.

A year later, on September 13, 1939, he was transferred to the Army College Research Department as an instructor of horsemanship and military instructor for the Imperial Military Academy. He received further promotions to Major on August 1, 1940, and to Lieutenant-Colonel on March 1, 1943.

Unknowing that it would be last time, Yi Geon was again transferred to the Army College Research Department on May 15, 1944.

=== Post-war and later life ===
After the war, Yi Geon remained in Japan. He lost his status as a member of the princely house in 1947 and began using the name Ken'ichi Momoyama. He lost Japanese nationality in 1952 following the coming into force of the Treaty of San Francisco and acquired Japanese nationality again by naturalisation in 1955. This also led to his wife and children to changing their names. His wife Seiko changed hers to Yoshiko and his children changed theirs to Tadahisa, Kinya, and Akiko.

During his divorce process, Momoyama met Yoshiko Maeda (前田美子, Maeda Yoshiko)and married her in 1952 where they had a son, Momoyama Koya, that same year. His second wife later adopted his daughter and son, but his son was soon adopted again to become the adoptive son of Maeda’s father, Maeda Fujiyoshi (前田藤吉), to continue the Maeda clan.

Yi Geon and his family lived in a rented municipal house in Yono City, Saitama Prefecture. Before the war, he was famous as a sports car enthusiast and owned many vehicles, including the British sports car Alvis speed 20 and the American Pierce-Arrow large limousine. This led him to serve as president of the Classic Car Club of Japan (CCJC) from the 1970s until his death.

Years later, his second son Momoyama Koya (桃山孝哉) served as vice principal of Kaisei Gakuin School.

In December 21, 1990, he died in Japan. A funeral was held under the supervision of the Japanese imperial family and acquaintances. An old military classmate and Japanese imperial family member Prince Mikasa came all the way to Urawa City to attend the funeral.

After the death of Yi Gu, Yi Geon’s half-nephew, in 2005, who was the Crown Prince of Changdeok Palace, the King Yeongchin royal line was cut off, and the question of who would succeed him arose. According to the law of primogeniture succession, the heir of Yi Geon, the eldest son of King Uichin, King Yeongchin's older brother, is the heir through the natural lineage. However, in the case of Yi Geon, he was naturalized as a Japanese citizen and was now of mixed blood with Japan, so there could be problems with legitimacy.

== Family ==
- Father - Prince Yi Kang (이강; 義親王 李堈; 30 March 1877 - 16 August 1955)
  - Grandfather - Yi Hui, King Gojong of Korea (고종 대한제국; 9 September 1852 - 21 January 1919)
  - Grandmother - Royal Consort Gwi-in of the Deoksu Jang clan (귀인 장씨; 10 October 1838 - 14 October 1887)
- Mother
  - Biological - Lady Jeong of the Sugwandang Hall (수관당 정씨)
  - Step - Kim Suk, Princess Consort Yeonwon of the Deokindang Hall (연원군부인 덕인당 김씨; 22 December 1880 - 14 January 1964)
- Wives and their children
  - Matsudaira Yoshiko (마쓰다이라 요시코; 松平佳子), later Momoyama Yoshiko (모모야마 요시코; 桃山佳子; 6 October 1911 - 28 June 2006)
    - Illegitimate son - Yi Chung (이충; 李沖), later Momoyama Tadahisa (모모야마 다다히사; 桃山忠久; 14 August 1932)
    - Son - Yi Gi (이기; 李沂), later Momoyama Kinya (모모야마 긴야; 桃山欣也; 4 March 1935)
    - Daughter - Yi Ok-ja (이옥자; 李沃子), later Momoyama Akiko (모모야마 아키코; 桃山明子; 19 December 1938)
  - Maeda Yoshiko (마에다 요시코; 前田美子), later Momoyama Yoshiko (모모야마 요시코; 桃山美子)
    - Son - Momoyama Koya (모모야마 고야; 桃山孝哉; 1952)
