= Yi Hae-won =

Korean royalty (1919–2020)

- Yi upon her marriage in 1936

Head of the House of Yi (disputed)
- Period: 16 July 2005 – 8 February 2020
- Coronation: 29 September 2006
- Predecessor: Crown Prince Yi Gu
- Successor: None
- Born: 24 April 1919; Sadong Palace, Keijō, Korea, Empire of Japan
- Died: 8 February 2020 (aged 100); Hanam, South Korea
- Spouse: Yi Seung-gyu
- Issue: Yi Jin-hyu; Yi Jin-wang; Yi Jin-ju; Yi Jin-hong
- House: Jeonju Yi (by birth); Yongin Yi (by marriage)
- Father: Prince Yi Kang of Korea
- Mother: Yi Hui-chun, Lady Yi of Sudeok Hall (biological); Kim Su-deok, Lady Kim of Deokin Hall (adoptive)

- Yi Hae-won
- Hangul: 이해원
- Hanja: 李海瑗
- RR: I Haewon
- MR: I Haewŏn

Korean imperial name
- Hangul: 이진
- Hanja: 李珍
- RR: I Jin
- MR: I Chin

Childhood name
- Hangul: 이길운, 이원
- Hanja: 李吉雲, 李瑗
- RR: I Gilun, I Won
- MR: I Kirun, I Wŏn

Yi Hae-won (Korean: 이해원; Hanja: 李海瑗; 24 April 1919 – 8 February 2020), also Lee Hae-won, was a member of the House of Yi, the royal family of Joseon and the Korean Empire. Yi was considered a pretender to the throne until her death at the age of 100 in her house in Hanam, Gyeonggi Province.

== Birth and marriage ==
Yi Haewon was born in Sadong Palace, which was an official residence of her family in Keijō, as the second daughter of Prince Imperial Ui, fifth son of Emperor Gojong of Korea, and one of his concubines, Lady Yi of Sudeok Hall. She was raised in Unhyeon Palace. After she graduated from Kyunggi Girls' High School in 1937, she married Yi Seunggyu, who was kidnapped and compulsorily taken to North Korea during the Korean War. They had three sons and one daughter.

== Coronation ==
Following the death of her cousin Yi Ku on 16 July 2005, members of the imperial family chose his adopted son, Yi Won, as the next Head of the House of Yi, bestowing on him the title, the Hereditary Prince Imperial of Korea (Hwangsason), representative of an inherited title from Yi Ku. Contesting her nephew's claim and appointment to the throne, Yi Haewŏn announced the restoration of the Empire. A private coronation ceremony was held on 29 September 2006, during which Yi Haewŏn was bestowed the title, the "Empress of Korea". According to one of her half-brothers, Yi Seok, another pretender, other close royal members didn't approve such a ceremony; Yi Seok himself was also invited, but did not attend, for he did not know who the members of the "Imperial Family Association of Daehanjeguk" were.

== Family ==
Yi Hae-won's husband, Yi Seung-gyu, descended from the Yongin Yi clan (용인 이씨; 龍仁 李氏), according to the Genealogy book of the clan published in 1983.

- Father: Yi Kang, Prince Imperial Ui (이강 의친왕) (30 March 1877 – 16 August 1955)
  - Grandfather: Emperor Gojong (고종) (8 September 1852 – 21 January 1919)
  - Grandmother: Imperial Consort Gwi-in of the Deoksu Jang clan (귀인 장씨; 貴人 張氏)
- Mother:
  - Biological: Lady Yi Hui-chun of Sudeok Hall (수덕당 이희춘); Yi Kang's 5th concubine
  - Adoptive: Kim Su-deok, Princess Consort Imperial Ui (김수덕 의친왕비)
    - Younger half-brother: Yi Seok (이석, 李錫; born 3 August 1941)
- Husband: Yi Seung-gyu (이승규, 李昇圭; born 4 September 1917)
  - Father-in-law: Yi Wan-yeong (이완영; 李完榮) (1895 – 1943), the only son of Yi Ju-sang (이주상; 李胄相).
  - Mother-in-law: Lady Yi Hui-gyeong of the Hansan Yi clan (이희경, 李喜慶; born 1895), the daughter of Yi Deok-gyu (이덕규; 李德珪).
- Children:
1. Son: Yi Jin-hyu (이진휴, 李鎭烋; born 24 January 1941) – married Lady Yi Ae-seon (이애선; 李愛仙).
2. Son: Yi Jin-wang (이진왕, 李鎭旺; 14 November 1945 – December 2019) – married Lady Park Jong-mi (박종미; 朴鍾美).
3. Daughter: Yi Jin-ju (이진주; 李鎭珠) (11 September 1947 – 1994) – died unmarried.
4. Son: Yi Jin-hong (이진홍, 李鎭弘; born 24 July 1949)

== See also ==
- House of Yi
- Joseon dynasty

Yi Hae-won House of Yi Born: 24 April 1919 Died: 8 February 2020
Titles in pretence
Vacant Title last held by Yi Ku	— TITULAR — Empress of Korea; 29 September 2006 – 8 February 2020; Reason for succession failure: Empire abolished in 1910	Vacant
