= Yi Kang =

Korean prince (1877–1955)

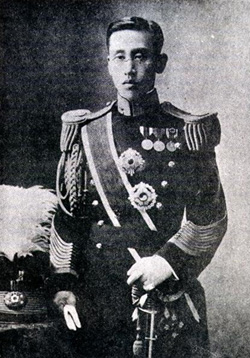
- Yi on his uniform as Lieutenant General in Imperial Korean Army
- Born: 30 March 1877; Hanseong-bu, Joseon
- Died: 15 August 1955 (aged 78); Andong Palace, Anguk-dong, Jongno-gu, Seoul, South Korea
- Burial: Hongyu-reung, Namyang-ju
- Spouse: Kim Su-deok, Princess Consort Ui of the First Rank (m. 1892; died 1964) Concubines: Lady Jeong of Sugwandang; Kim Heung-in, Lady Suindang; Jeong Un-seok, Lady Suhyundang; Cho Byung-suk; Yi Hui-chun, Lady Sudeokdang; Kim Jeong-wan, Lady Suwandang; Park Yeong-hui, Lady Sugildang; Lady Song; Kim Chang-hui, Lady Sokyungdang; Ham Kae-bong; Kim Hye-su; Hong Jeong-sun
- Issue Detail: Prince Yi Geon (Later Kenichi Momoyama); Prince Yi U Yi Bang; Yi Hae-wan; Yi Chang; Yi Ju; Yi Hae-won; Yi Gon (Successor of Yi Kang); Yi Hae-chun; Yi Hae-suk; Yi Gwang; Yi Hyun; Yi Haegyeong; Yi Gap; Yi Seok; Yi Hoe-ja; Yi Hwan; Yi Hae-ran; Yi Jung; Yi Hae-ryeon; Yi Chang-hui
- House: House of Yi
- Father: Emperor Gojong of Korea
- Mother: Empress Myeongseong(legal); Lady Jang of the Deoksu Jang clan(birth)
- Religion: Roman Catholic Church

- Yi Kang
- Hangul: 이강
- Hanja: 李堈
- RR: I Gang
- MR: I Kang

Royal title
- Hangul: 의친왕; 의왕; 의화군
- Hanja: 義親王; 義王; 義和君
- RR: Uichinwang; Uiwang; Uihwagun
- MR: Ŭich'inwang; Ŭiwang; Ŭihwagun

Yi Kang, Prince Ui of the First Rank (Korean: 의친왕 이강; 30 March 1877 – 15 August 1955), also known as Prince Imperial Ui, was the second son of Emperor Gojong of Korea and his concubine, Lady Jang, who was a court lady-in-waiting.

In 1891, his father King Gojong issued a decree naming Yi Prince Uihwa with the style of Royal Highness. Yi married Lady Kim Su-deok, the daughter of court official Kim Sajun.

Upon the declaration of Korean Empire in 1897, Yi was enthroned as King Ui or Prince Ui of the First Rank by his father Emperor Gojong of Korea in 1900 along with his younger brother, Yi Un.

== Biography ==
=== Education and early life ===
Despite being born as a son of Gojong of Korea, there are not many official records about his early life, which may be a result of having been borne by Lady Jang, a court lady-in-waiting of King Gojong but not the king's official consort or concubine during her lifetime. Lady Jang came from the Deoksu Jang clan, and Queen Inseon (Hyojong of Joseon's queen consort) was her distant relative. (Note: According to the Jang family genealogy book published in 1974, Lady Jang was recorded as daughter of Jang Seok-Jeong (장석정, 1736–1796) but the time didn't match; it's also conjectured that her father could be Jang Jwa-geun (장좌근, b. 1819), a grandson of Jang Seok-Jeong, and Lady Yi of the Jeonju Yi clan (b. 1821).) According to the tradition, the half-brothers of the crown prince, in this case, Yi Cheok (future Sunjong of Korea), needed to move out from the palace until the latter reached the age 10, so there were some years that Yi Kang lived with Pak Yung-hio, the son-in-law of King Cheoljong. During the Kapsin Coup in 1884, Yi Kang and his mother were taken by Pak Yung-hio to the palace; contemporary rumors claimed that the coup d'état tried to replace the king with Yi Kang; but after the coup ended, Yi left the palace again.

Later, Queen Min, Gojong's wife, asked her husband to grant Yi Kang a title, so Yi Kang became Prince Uihwa (의화군) in 1891. After three rounds of choosing in 1893, the daughter of an official Kim Sa-jun, Lady Kim Deok-su, was chosen to be the spouse of Yi Kang, which was arranged by Queen Min. Lady Kim, also known as "Lady Kim of Deokindang", was a distant relative to Queen Inmok, the queen consort of Seonjo of Joseon in the early 17th century; (Note: Through her father, Kim Deok-su was an 8-great-grandniece of Queen Inmok.) Yi Kang did not have children by her. Even after getting married, Yi Kang got involved in debt and lawsuit problems.

Prince Yi Kang was appointed special ambassador to the Empire of Japan for the celebration ceremonies for Japan's victory in the First Sino-Japanese War of 1894–1895. Yun Ch'iho, who met Yi before going Europe, assessed him as a smart 18-year-old who had a good personality like his father but who was anxious to study abroad. In August 1895, Yi was appointed as special ambassador and visited European countries including the United Kingdom, Germany, France, Russia, Italy and Austria-Hungary. In 1899, he visited Japan. According to Japanese records, 3,000 Won were sent to Yi. While he was not in Korea, Yi Kang was promoted to the rank of Prince Imperial Ui, and styled His Imperial Highness in 1900. At the same year, he went to the United States and began studying at Roanoke College in Salem, Virginia from March 1901, where he majored in mathematics. While he was in the United States, the Korean Government gave him 30,000 Won in 1902. While in America, Yi was beaten by some Americans in 1903. In 1904, some Korean foreign students tried to dethrone Gojong and make Yi the emperor. After graduation, he spent a brief period at the Ohio Wesleyan University in Delaware, Ohio, and then traveled to San Francisco and Hawaii, returning to Korea on 15 March 1906. The same year, he got Order of the Golden Ruler. On 8 April 1906, Yi was appointed as Lieutenant General (부장). He was appointed as Chanmogwan and was ordered to participate in a military parade in the Empire of Japan. He received the 1st class of the Order of the Paulownia Flowers from the Japanese government while he was in Japan.

Prince Yi Kang served as the president of the Korean Red Cross from 1906 to 1907. On 15 January 1907, Yi persuaded civilians and military personnels to raise a Righteous army. When Emperor Gojong abdicated and Sunjong succeeded him as Emperor, Yi was not appointed as the crown prince, but instead his younger brother, Yi Un; this was because Yi did not receive public support and Gojong was not fond of him. Also, Imperial Consort Sunheon bribed Itō Hirobumi, who was the Japanese Resident General of Korea, to appoint her son as the crown prince. When Itō Hirobumi was assassinated by An Jung-geun, Yi was ordered to participate in the funeral as the deputy of the Korean Imperial House. The order, however, was canceled and the Minister of the Imperial Household Min Byeong-seok was sent instead.

=== Under Japanese rule ===
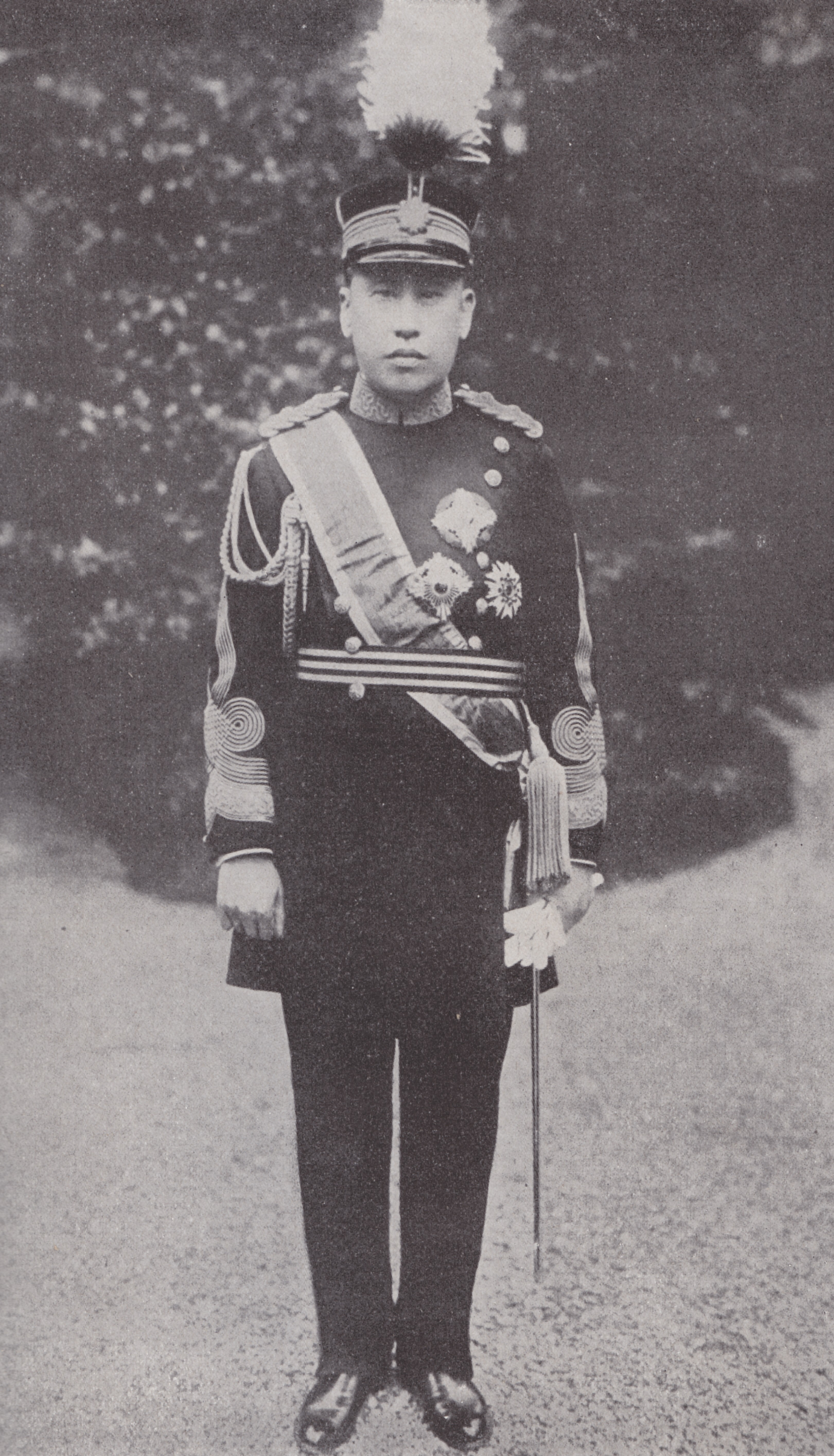
Duke Yi Kang in Imperial Japanese dress uniform in 1934

Following the abdication of Emperor Gojong in 1907, and the Japan-Korea Treaty of 1910 through which Korea was annexed to the Empire of Japan, Prince Yi Kang grew increasingly dissatisfied with his status, even though the Japanese provided him with a huge annual allowance. At the same time, the title "Prince Imperial Ui" was abolished and Yi received a reduction in rank to Duke by Japanese until 1930.

During the March 1st Movement, Yi participated as one of the representatives of Korea. Since Yi had studied abroad and knew much about the world, the Provisional Government of the Republic of Korea wanted Yi to join the government. After the escape of Gim Ga-jin, an Imperial Korean official before, the Provisional Government's objective was Yi's refuge in Shanghai. On 9 November 1919, he collaborated with Choe Ik-hwan, a member of Daedongdan, who attempted to support him as the new leader of Korea. Prince Yi Kang then tried to escape to the Provisional Government of Korea based in Shanghai, only to be discovered in Dandong from Manchuria and returned to his home country. Lee Jong-Wook had received orders from Ahn Changho to accompany Yi and help him escape. With the help of Cheon Un-boek, who was an employee of the Japanese General Government Building, Yi successfully met Lee Jong-Wook, who came to rescue him. Yi disguised his face by attaching a mustache on his face. However, Yi was caught near the Dandong Station, which is located in Zhenxing District. On 13 November 1919, Yi was sent back to Keijō by Japanese police force. After this, the Japanese government claimed that Yi Kang was "abducted" and "wanted to escape to live profligately again". Later, Yi Kang asked to be deprived of his title multiple times, but this wasn't approved. Yi's home became part of Deoksugung.

On 20 November 1919, Yi had an interview with Tongnip Sinmun. He said that he would rather be a peasant of the independent Korea than a noble of Empire of Japan. His exile promoted a positive view towards the Imperial family, and the Japanese attempted to devalue the exile as a trivial issue.

During the tenure of Saitō Makoto, Saitō met Yi many times and tried to change his stance on independence.

As of 10 November 1925, a law for defining the status of the former Korean imperial family was made. In 1930, due to Yi's continuous independent movement activities against Japan, Yi was stripped of his Duke rank by Japan and became a commoner. On 12 June 1930, Yi officially retired and his eldest son Yi Geon succeeded him as duke. Yi Kang's styles and allowances still remained until the end of World War II.

Throughout the Japanese rule, there were only few members of Yi Kang family recognized by Japan: Yi Kang himself, his wife Kim Deok-su (Duchess Consort of Yi Kang), his eldest son Duke Yi Geon with his family, and his second son Duke Yi U (adopted as the heir to Duke Yi Jun-yong in 1917) with his family.

=== After independence ===
After the independence of Korea, he continued to live in Seoul, but in increasing poverty. On 9 August 1955 he was baptized a Roman Catholic, given the Christian name "Pius"; Lady Kim was also baptized and given the name of "Maria". Yi said that the reason why he was baptized a Roman Catholic was to apologize for the anti-Catholicism of Joseon led by Heungseon Daewongun. Yi Kang died a week later on 15 August 1955, at the age of 78, in his mansion "Seongrakwon" Manor (now Seongnagwon Garden, in Seongbuk District, Seoul); he was buried at the Hongneung and Yureung imperial tombs in Namyangju near Seoul, where his father and brothers are also buried. His official heritor was chosen as his third son, Yi Bang on 30 June 1970.

== Family ==
Prince Imperial Ui, Yi Kang married Kim Su-deok (22 December 1880 – 14 January 1964) in 1892; however, the couple had no children. Therefore, all children Yi Kang had, 12 sons and 9 daughters, were born by 13 of his various concubines. Since his first son Yi Geon was naturalized to Japan, and his second to fifth sons were adopted by royal relatives, his sixth son, Yi Gon became the successor of Yi Kang. Currently Yi Gon's first son, Yi Jun (b. 1961) is the current heir of Prince Imperial Ui and is the chairperson of Prince Imperial Ui Memorial Foundation.

=== Wife ===
Name	Hanja and Korean	Birth	Death	Bon-gwan	Parents	Issue
Kim Su-deok (Note: "Kim Suk" was her official name, while "Kim Su-deok" was her original name by birth, whereas the more known one.)	金淑 김숙	22 December 1880	14 January 1964	Yonan Kim clan	Baron Kim Sa-jun; Lady, of the Changwon Hwang clan	No issue

=== Concubines ===
Courtesy Title	Name	Issue
Lady Jeong of Sugwan Hall (수관당 정씨)	Lady Jeong (정씨)	1st son: Yi Geon (b. 1909)
Lady Kim of Suin Hall (수인당 김씨)	Kim Heung-in (김흥인)	2nd son: Yi U (b. 1912); 5th son: Yi Ju (b. 1917); 6th son: Yi Gon (b. 1919)
Lady Jeong of Suhyeon Hall (수현당 정씨)	Jeong Un-seok (정운석)	3rd son: Yi Bang (b. 1914)
—	Cho Byeong-suk (조병숙)	4th son: Yi Chang (b. 1915)
Lady Yi of Sudeok Hall (수덕당 이씨)	Yi Hui-chun (이희춘)	1st daughter: Yi Hae-wan (b. 1918); 2nd daughter: Yi Hae-won (b. 1919)
Lady Kim of Suwan Hall (수완당 김씨)	Kim Jeong-wan (김정완)	3rd daughter: Yi Hae-chun (b. 1920)
Lady Park of Sugil Hall (수길당 박씨)	Park Yeong-hui (박영희)	4th daughter: Yi Hae-suk (b. 1920)
—	Lady Song (송씨)	7th son: Yi Kwang (b. 1920)
Lady Kim of Sugyeong Hall (수경당 김씨)	Kim Chang-hui (김창희)	8th son: Yi Hyun (b. 1922)
—	Kim Geum-deok (김금덕)	5th daughter: Yi Haegyeong (b. 1930)
—	Ham Gae-bong (함개봉)	9th son: Yi Gap (b. 1938)
—	Kim Hye-su (김혜수)	6th daughter: Yi Hoe-ja (b. 1940); 11th son: Yi Hwan (b. 1944); 9th daughter: Yi Chang-hui (b. 1953)
—	Hong Jeong-sun (홍정순)	10th son: Yi Seok (b. 1941); 7th daughter: Yi Hae-ran (b. 1944); 12th son: Yi Jeong (b. 1947); 8th daughter: Yi Haeryeon (b. 1950)

=== Sons ===
	Name	Hanja	Birth Name	Registered Name	Birth	Death	Notes	Family
1	Yi Geon 이건	李鍵	Yi Yong-gil 이용길	—	1909	1990	Acquired the duke title in 1930 after his father; Naturalized as a Japanese citizen in 1947 and changed the name to "Momoyama Kenichi" (桃山虔一)	Wife: Matsudaira Yoshiko (松平誠子), daughter of Captain Matsudaira Yutaka and a first cousin of Yi Bangja. They had two sons and a daughter; divorced in 1951; Wife: Maeda Yoshiko (前田美子), daughter of Maeda Fujiyoshi. They had a son and two daughters
2	Yi U 이우	李鍝	Yi Seong-gil 이성길	—	1912	1945	Adopted as the heir to Duke Yi Jun in 1917	Wife: Park Chan-ju, eldest daughter of Park Il-seo and a granddaughter of Marquess Pak Yung-hio. They had two sons including Yi Cheong
3	Yi Bang 이방	李鎊	Yi Heung-gil 이흥길	Yi Hae-jin 이해진	1914	1951		No issue
4	Yi Chang 이창	李鎗	Yi Chang-gil 이창길	Yi Hae-jik 이해직	1915	?	Adopted as the heir to Yi Heon-yong (1886–1921), a 4th cousin of Yi Kang; He died in the United States	Wife: Cho Ui-hye (조의혜); they had two sons and two daughters
5	Yi Ju 이주	李鑄	Yi Su-gil 이수길	Yi Hae-il 이해일	1917	1982	Adopted as the heir to Baron Yi Yin-yong (1907–1970), a 3rd cousin of Yi Kang; The 7th chairman of the Jeonju Lee Royal Family Association in 1971–1974	Wife: Cheongija (천기자/千枝子), a Japanese; they had two sons and two daughters; Wife: Kim Sin-deok (김신덕); they had a son
6	Yi Gon 이곤	李錕	Yi Myung-gil 이명길		1919	1984	The heir to his father upon the death of Yi Kang	Wife: Hwang Gyung-saeng (황경생); Their son Yi Jun is the current successor of Yi Kang.
7	Yi Gwang 이광	李鑛	Yi Hyung-gil 이형길	Yi Hae-cheong 이해청	1920	1952	Adopted as the heir to Viscount Yi Ki-yong (1889–1961), a second cousin of Yi Kang; died of a heart attack when swimming in 1952	
8	Yi Hyun 이현	李鉉	Yi Gyung-gil 이경길		1922	1996	died in the retirement home belonged to the Roman Catholic Diocese of Suwon, located on Jowon-dong, Suwon, Gyeonggi Province of Korea	Never married
9	Yi Gap 이갑	李鉀	Yi Chung-gil 이충길	Yi Hae-ryung 이해룡	1938	2014	His eldest son, Yi Won, was appointed by the Jeonju Lee Royal Family Association as the heir to Yi Ku, the 29th head of the Korean Imperial family, in 2005	Wife: Yi Gyung-suk (이경숙); they had two sons and a daughter
10	Yi Seok 이석	李錫	Yi Yung-gil 이영길	Yi Hae-seok 이해석	1941		Self-claimed pretender to the imperial throne upon the death of Yi Ku from 2005 up until 2021 or 2022.	Wife: Dokko Jeong-hui (독고정희); they had a daughter (Yi Hong) and divorced in the 1970s; Wife: Kim Jin-ok (김진옥); they had a daughter and later divorced
11	Yi Hwan 이환	李鐶	Yi Mun-gil 이문길	Yi Hae-seon 이해선	1944			
12	Yi Jeong 이정	李鉦	Yi Jeong-gil 이정길	Yi Hae-jun 이해준	1947			

=== Daughters ===
	Name	Birth Name	Registered Name	Hanja	Birth	Death	Notes	
1	Yi Yung 이영	Yi Gil-sun 이길순	Yi Hae-wan 이해완	李海琬	1918	1981	Adopted by Viscount Yi Ki-yong	
2	Yi Jin 이진	Yi Gil-un 이길운	Yi Hae-won 이해원	李海瑗	1919	2020	Adopted by Viscount Yi Ki-yong	Husband: Yi Seung-gyu (이승규); they had three sons and a daughter; Self-claimed "Empress of Korea" in 2006–2020
3	Yi Chan 이찬	Yi Gil-yun 이길연	Yi Hae-chun 이해춘	李海珺	1920	2009	Adopted by Viscount Yi Ki-yong	Husband: Marquess Park Chan-beom (박찬범), grandson of Pak Yung-hio and his successor; they had a son but later divorced
4	Yi Suk 이숙	Yi Gil-yung 이길영	Yi Hae-suk 이해숙	李海璛	1920	?	Adopted by Viscount Yi Ki-yong	Husband: Yi Hak-jin (이학진); they had a daughter
5	Yi Gong 이공	Yi Gil-sang 이길상	Yi Haegyeong 이해경	李海瓊	1930		Adopted by Viscount Yi Ki-yong	Also known as "Amy Hai Kyung Lee"; Moved to Texas in 1956 and worked as a Korean Studies Librarian in Columbia University since the 1960s; she retired in 1996
6	Yi Jang 이장	Yi Hui-ja 이희자		李惠子	1940	2015	Became a nun and went by the name, either Catalina (카타리나) or Paulina (바울리나), in the Society of Saint Paul until her death	
7	Yi Yong 이용	Yi Suk-gi 이숙기	Yi Hae-ran 이해란	李海珃	1944			
8	Yi Hyun 이현	Yi Suk-hyang 이숙향	Yi Hae-ryun 이해련	李海瑢	1950			
9	Yi Min 이민	Yi Chang-hui 이창희		李昌惠	1953			

== Ancestry ==
Ancestors of Yi Kang

Yi Byeong-won (1752–1822)
Prince Namyeon (1788–1836)
Lady Jeong of the Yeonil Jeong clan (1753–1792)
Heungseon Daewongun (1820–1898)
Min Gyeong-hyeok (1746–1815)
Lady Min of the Yeoheung Min clan (1788–1831)
Lady Han of the Cheongju Han clan (1744–1822)
Gojong of Korea (1852–1919)
Min Dan-hyeon (1768–1858)
Min Chi-Ku (1795–1874)
Lady Park of the Miryang Park clan (1769–1843)
Sunmok Budaebuin (1818–1898)
Yi Ok (1773–1820) (Note: A 9-great-grandson of Deokheung Daewongun, the 7th son of Jungjong of Joseon.)
Lady Yi of the Jeonju Yi clan (1797–1873)
Lady Kim of the Gyeongju Kim clan (1770–1832)
Yi Kang, Prince Imperial Ui (1877–1955)
Jang Seok-Jeong (1736–1796)
Jang Un (1792–1827)
Jang Jwa-geun (b. 1819)
Lady Choe of the Gyeongju Choe clan (1793–1876)
Lady Jang of the Deoksu Jang clan
Yi Buk-eung
Lady Yi of the Jeonju Yi clan (b. 1821)

== Honours ==
Korean Empire

- Order of the Golden Ruler on 9 April 1906

Empire of Japan

- Order of the Paulownia Flowers 1st class on 27 April 1906
- Korean Colonization Decoration on 1 August 1912
- Grand Cordon of the Order of the Rising Sun
