= Yi Hong =

South Korean model and entertainer (b. 1974)

- Born: 1974 (age 51–52); Seoul, South Korea
- Spouse: Han Yeong-gwang (2000–2002)
- Issue: A daughter
- House: House of Yi
- Father: Yi Seok
- Mother: Donkgo Jeonghui

- Yi Hong
- Hangul: 이홍
- Hanja: 李洪
- RR: I Hong
- MR: I Hong

Yi Hong (Korean: 이홍), is a South Korean retired model and entertainer. She is descendant of Joseon royalty; she is the eldest daughter of Yi Seok by his second wife, Donkgo Jeonghui, and a great-granddaughter of Emperor Gojong of Korea.

== Biography ==
Yi Hong was born in Chigung palace in the neighborhood of Gujeong-dong located next to Gyeongbokgung palace, Seoul, the main palace of the Joseon dynasty. Her father, Yi Seok is the eleventh son of Prince Imperial Ui, the 5th son of Emperor Gojong of Korea. He was a well known singer in the 1960s while in his twenties, having several hit songs including "Bidulgi jip (Dove's house). Yi Seok is currently lecturing at Jeonju University and several universities. Her parents divorced when she was at the age of three in Korean age, so Yi was raised by her maternal grandmother. Since 1979, she had lived in the United States for 10 years. Yi did not know that she was a descendant of the Korean imperial family until she was at the first year of her middle school. She first met her father at her senior year of her high school 6 months before she took the university entrance exam. In an interview with a weekly magazine, she confessed that she felt glad to meet her father, and at the same time, she was in confusion.

After graduation from the Industrial design department at Hansung University, she worked as an interior designer for a short period. Yi then studied business in Japan. Although she appeared in several films as a small roles, Yi officially started her career as an entertainer by starring in a KTF commercial. She also appeared in a Samsung Anicall commercial, and singer Jo Gwan-u's music video. In an interview with Hankook Ilbo in 2007, Yi Hong wished to restore the dignity of the empire.

In 2000, she married Han Yeong-gwang (한영광), an actor. They have one child, a daughter born in 2001. As of 2022, Yi Hong is retired from the entertainment industry, but works to promote traditional Korean culture.
