= Andrew Lee (entrepreneur) =

American entrepreneur

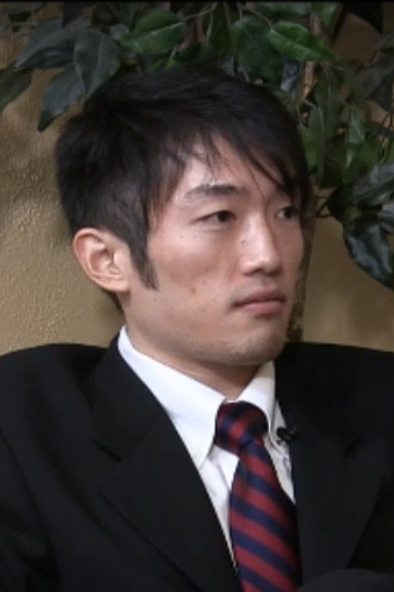
- Lee in 2011

Head of the House of Yi (disputed)
- Reign: 2021 or 2022 (Note: According to archives of Yi Seok's website, he abdicated to Andrew Lee some time between the 9th of December 2021 and the 17th of January 2022.) – present
- Predecessor: Yi Seok

Sovereign (Note: Andrew Lee, unlike his predecessor, does not style himself as an emperor, but rather as a king. This is despite the use of the term "Joseon Empire", a historiographically incorrect term which should have been either the Kingdom of Joseon or Korean Empire) of the "Joseon Empire"
- Reign: 2023 – present
- Born: Indianapolis, Indiana, United States
- Spouse: Nana Lee (maiden name unknown)
- House: Yi
- Father: Jay Lee (born in Jeonju)
- Andrew Lee's voice Andrew Lee talking about Mt. Gox Live; Recorded 10 August 2011

- Yi Dangun
- Hangul: 이단군
- Hanja: 李檀君
- RR: I Dangun
- MR: I Tan'gun

Andrew Lee, also known as Dangun (born December 1983), is an American entrepreneur and the founder of the VPN service Private Internet Access, which started in 2010. Since 2023, he has been the self-proclaimed King of the non-territorial "Joseon Empire", recognized by Antigua and Barbuda as a successor state to Joseon and the Korean Empire; in the media, he is known as "Crown Prince of Korea" after being adopted by Yi Seok, a grandson of Emperor Gojong of Korea.

== Early life and education ==
Andrew Lee was born in Indianapolis and raised in Carmel, a city in the Indianapolis metro area. He is the son of Jay Lee, a South Korean immigrant that was born in Jeonju. Lee states that his parents "had nearly nothing when they came to the United States" and made sacrifices for him and his brother. He enrolled in Purdue University and transferred to the University at Buffalo, but later dropped out to start working.

== Career ==
In 2009, Lee founded London Trust Media (LTM), a private holdings company. In 2010, he founded Private Internet Access (PIA), a virtual private network service for anonymizing Internet traffic. He claimed to have started PIA because of his interest in Internet Relay Chat (IRC), whose users' IP addresses could be easily revealed, but only after the Freenode purchase. Lee and co-owner Steve DeProspero sold LTM (and its subsidiary PIA) to Israeli company Kape Technologies for US$95.5 million in November 2019. Lee co-founded Mt. Gox Live, a bitcoin price tracker that was later acquired by the now-defunct bitcoin exchange Mt. Gox.

In 2017, Christel Dahlskjaer, then the head of staff at Freenode, incorporated and transferred ownership of Freenode Limited to Lee; Dahlskjaer and Lee said the company was solely for funding the network and running the Freenode #live conferences. According to staff, they were not informed of the contents of the deal and were told that it would not affect Freenode's day-to-day operations, as the company only managed the conference and nothing else. A dispute over changes Lee imposed in 2021 resulted in all of Freenode's 20 to 30 staff members resigning. This team went on to form a new network called Libera Chat.

In present day, Lee's holding company, Imperial Family Companies, continues to own Freenode, Legacy Fighting Alliance, Chime TV and others.

On 27 July 2025, Andrew Lee launched a new VPN service called VP.net.

== Pretender to the Yi dynasty ==
According to Andrew Lee, Won Joon Lee, one of his distant relatives and grandson of a keeper of the House of Yi lineage, said that their clan was descended from Korean royalty; as the result, he was introduced to Yi Seok, a grandson of Emperor Gojong of Korea. Yi Seok is known as an active pretender to the former monarchy, but he has no male offspring, and he proposed adopting Andrew Lee as his heir, which Andrew was initially reluctant. Regarding Andrew Lee's ancestry, Yi Seok has only stated that he was a descendant of Yi Seong-gye, keeping said ancestry vague. (Note: ETtoday suggests a potential blood relation via "similar facial structures between Lee and the Gwangmu Emperor", however it is unknown where this information surfaced from or whether if this information is correct.) In October 2018, Seok declared Andrew the crown prince of Korea at a ceremony in Los Angeles, attended by Bermuda premier David Burt, and city officials from Los Angeles and Jeonju. Andrew Lee later took over Yi Seok's status as the claimant to the Joseon throne in 2022.

=== Joseon Cybernation ===
Media statement from the office of Prime Minister of Antigua and Barbuda acknowledging recognition of the Joseon Cybernation.

Lee claims to be the sovereign of a "non-territorial successor" to the Great Joseon State, which he claims to have reestablished as a "cybernation" that exists only in digital space. In April 2022, Joseon signed a treaty of peace, amity, and commerce, with Antigua and Barbuda for economic and development initiatives. In 2023, Joseon established diplomatic relations with Antigua and Barbuda, though "cyberstates" do not exist under international law. Antigua and Barbuda later clarified that this would not affect its existent relations with South Korea. Following the establishment of ties, the Joseon Cybernation provided Antigua and Barbuda with $1.5 million to help renovate school facilities. The Joseon Cybernation has since claimed on social media that it has been in discussion with the governments of Saint Vincent and the Grenadines and Mongolia.

== Personal life ==
In 2020, Lee and his family moved to a mansion in Hidden Valley, Ventura County, California.

In the afternoon of 18 November 2022, J-Money, driving a Rolls-Royce Phantom registered to Andrew Lee, was shot and robbed by two men in Koreatown, Los Angeles. As of February 2023, the perpetrators have not been identified. Andrew Lee has collaborated with J-Money on multiple occasions, including an appearance on J-Money's album titled "Dun It All".

As of 2026, Lee identifies as Christian.

== Notes ==
Andrew Lee (entrepreneur) House of Yi Born: December 1983
Titles in pretence
| Preceded by Yi Seok | — TITULAR — Emperor of Korea; 2021/2022 - present Reason for succession failure: Empire abolished in 1910 | No designated heir |
Cultural offices
| Title created | Ruler of the Joseon Empire; 2023 - present | No designated heir |
