= House of Yi =

Joseon and Korean Empire royal family

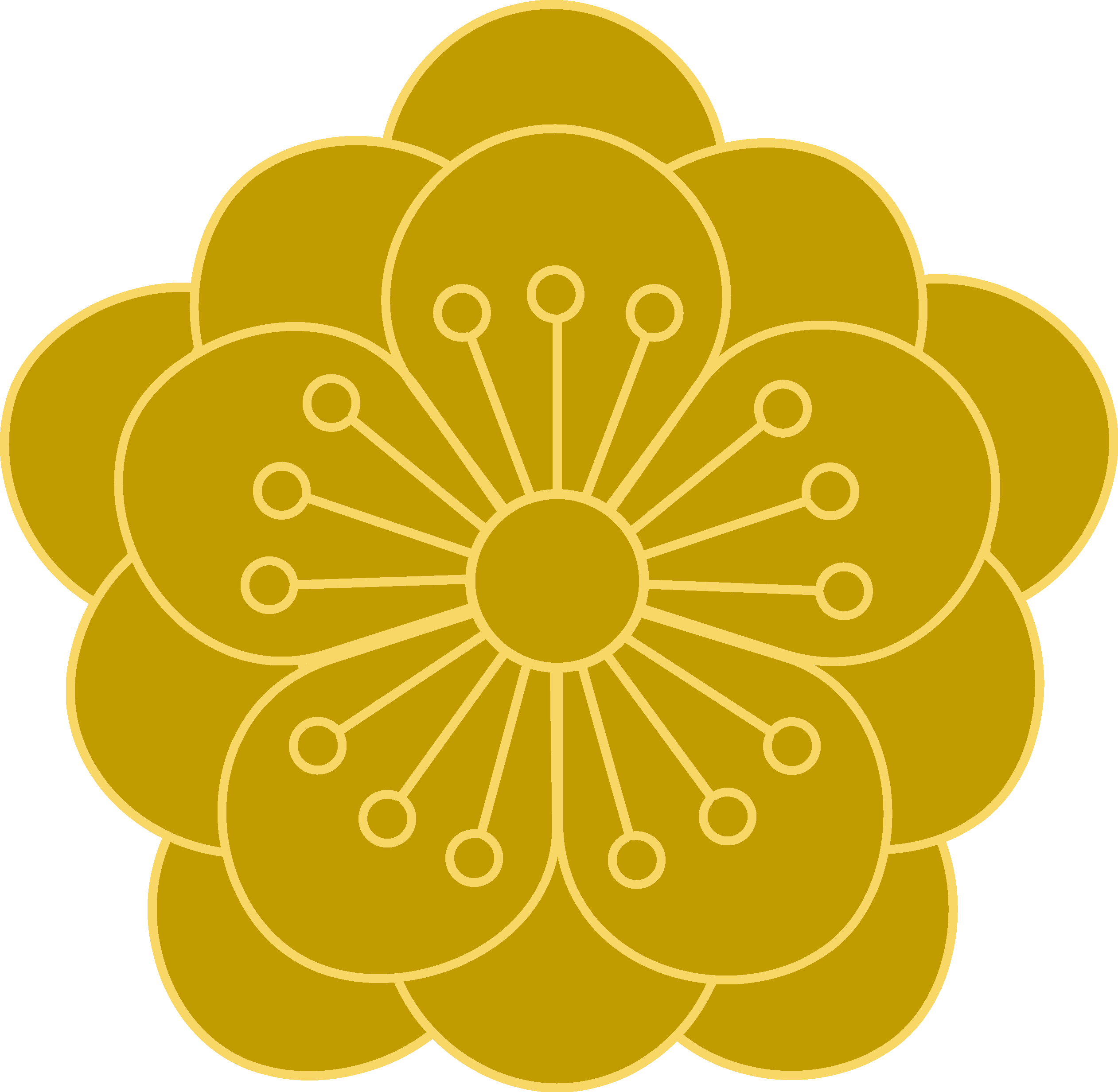
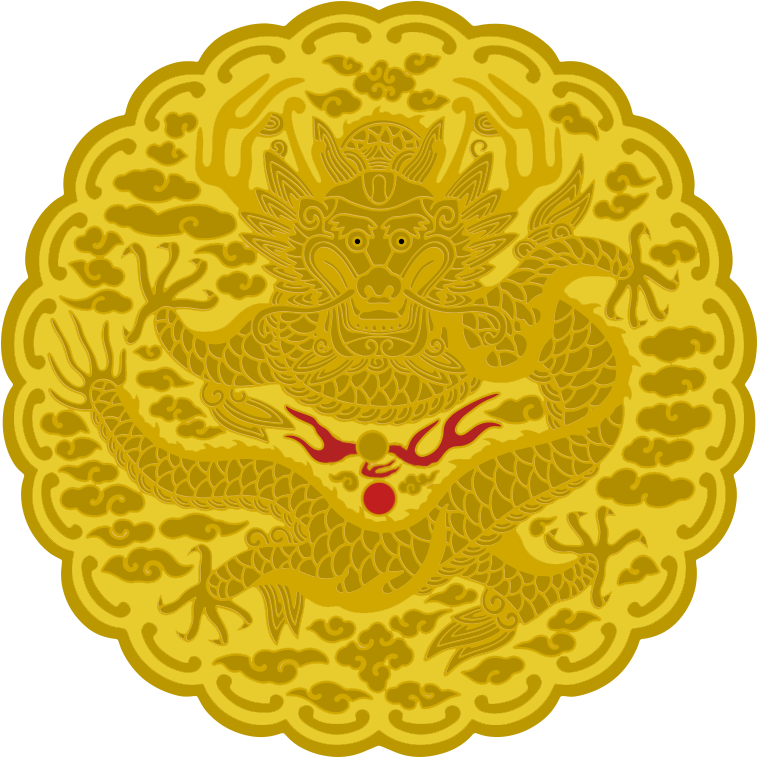
- Parent house: Jeonju Yi clan
- Country: Joseon; Korean Empire
- Founded: 5 August 1392 (Joseon's founding)
- Founder: Taejo of Joseon
- Current head: disputed
- Final ruler: Sunjong of Korea
- Titles: King of Joseon; Emperor of Korea
- Deposition: 29 August 1910
- Cadet branches: 125 cadet branches (approximately 105 extant) including: House of Grand Prince Jinan; House of Crown Prince Yangnyeong; House of Grand Prince Hyoryeong; House of Prince Milseong; House of Grand Prince Gwangpyeong; House of Grand Internal Prince Deokheung

The House of Yi was the royal family of Joseon and later the imperial family of the Korean Empire, descended from the Joseon founder Yi Seong-gye. All of his descendants are members of the Jeonju Yi clan.

After the Japan–Korea Treaty of 1910, in which the Empire of Japan annexed the Korean Peninsula, some members of the Jeonju Yi clan were incorporated into the Imperial House of Japan and the Japanese peerage by the Japanese government. This lasted until 1947, just before the Constitution of Japan was promulgated. The treaty was nullified in the Treaty on Basic Relations between Japan and the Republic of Korea.

With the Constitution succeeding to the Provisional Government, the descendants of the imperial family continue to be given preference and constitute a favored symbol in South Korea. The July 2005 funeral of Yi Ku, former head of the royal household, attracted considerable media coverage. The descendants of the Emperor Gojong founded the Royal Foundation of Korea in 2022 headed by the eldest great-grandson of the Emperor Gojong, Yi Jun.

== History ==
=== Early era (15th century) ===
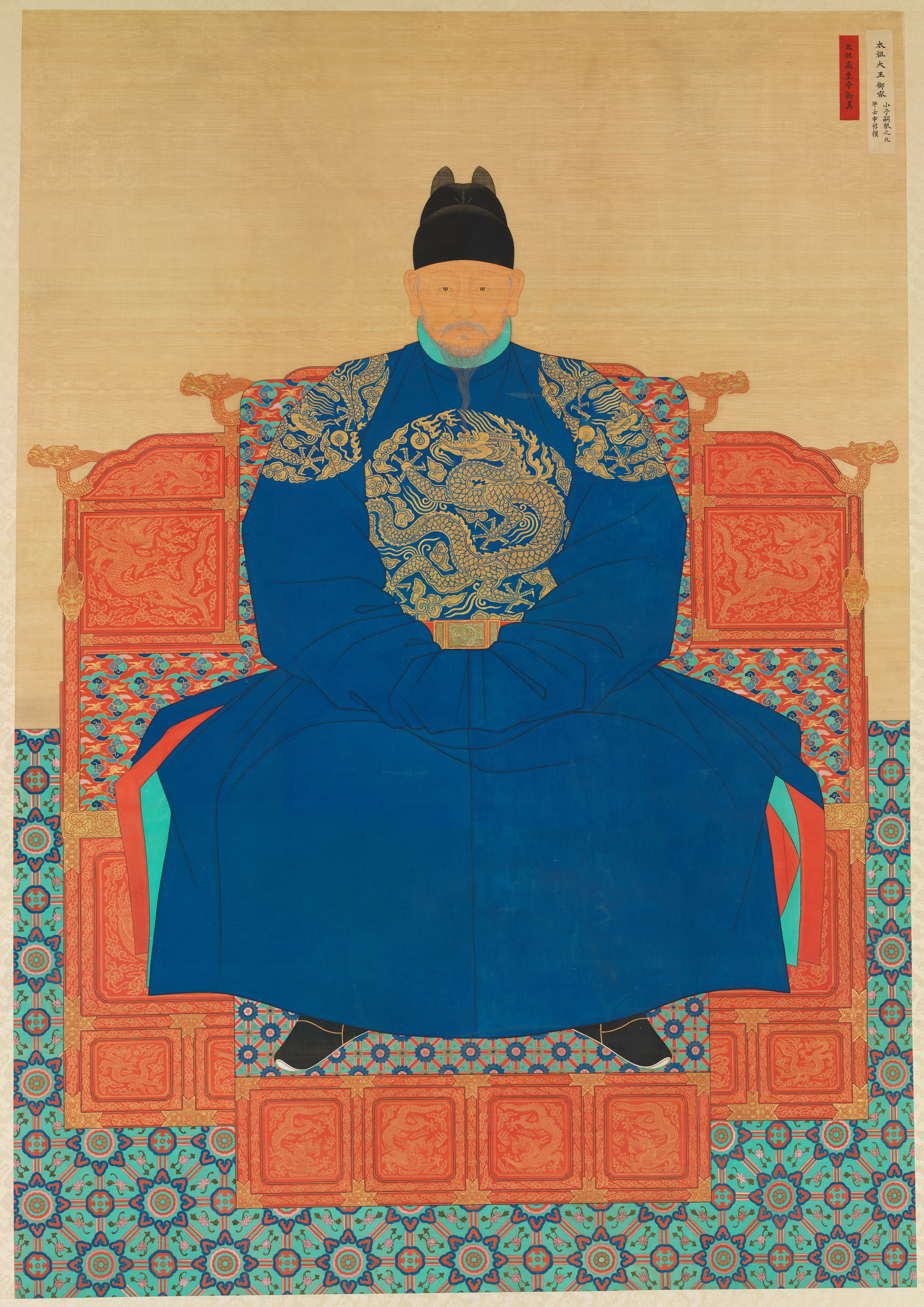
Portrait for Taejo of Joseon, a 1872 copy painted by Cho Chungmuk

When Taejo of Joseon ascended to the throne in 1392, he continued to use the laws of Goryeo, and the noble titles he gave to his sons, nephews, and sons-in-law were all "prince" (군). After the coup d'état in 1398, the system of noble titles changed: "duke" for king's sons, "marquis" for royal descendants, and "earl" for officers of senior first rank. This system was abolished in 1401 to avoid "usurping" the existing title laws of the more powerful Ming dynasty.

As of 1412, Taejong of Joseon approved a new system for giving titles to the royalty: among the sons of a king, those who were born by the queen can acquire the title "grand prince" (대군), and the rest can be the "prince" (군); both princes are of senior first rank and their male descendants are as well insofar as their great-grandsons can retrieve official positions. According to the Veritable Records of the Joseon Dynasty, the title "prince" (군) was at first restricted to be given to sons or grandsons of kings, but these standards became looser over time. Generally, a royal eligible to be a prince could not receive the title automatically even if his rank raised him to the junior second rank. But such a hereditary title could be passed down to generations until it exceeds more than four generations (from the king).

Similar to male royals, female royals received titles according to their kinship to the kings. Daughters of the king and queen were called 공주 (gongju), girls born to other consorts and fathered by the king were called 옹주 (ongju) to differentiate, and some further distant female royalties also had different titles; in English all these titles are translated as "princess". If the above-mentioned females were stripped of titles due to various reasons, they would be referred to as a commoner; for instance, the eldest daughter of deposed Yeonsangun of Joseon was addressed as "Ku Mun-gyeong's wife" after 1506. Later, there were also so-called "Kim Se-ryung's wife" (former Princess Hyomyeong) and "Jeong's wife" (former Princess Hwawan).

=== Middle era ===
In 1469, Seongjong of Joseon ascended to the throne as the adopted heir to his uncle, Yejong of Joseon. As of 1475, Seongjong asked the Ming dynasty government to ratify his biological father, Crown Prince Uigyeong, to have a posthumous status as a king, and a temple name "Deokjong" was made for the late crown prince. A similar event took place in 1568, when Seonjo of Joseon succeeded the throne as the adopted heir to his half-uncle, Myeongjong of Joseon. Based on official advice, instead of giving his biological father (Prince Deokheung) a title of "king" posthumously, Seonjo created a new title for him in 1569, Deokheung Daewongun (덕흥대원군), as an honor to the late prince. This action had a precedent in 1066, when Emperor Yingzong of Song promoted his biological father (Zhao Yunrang) without posthumously elevating him to the status of emperor.

Following the precedent by Seonjo, three more royals were designated as Daewongun throughout the Joseon history: Prince Jeongwon (1623, but later promoted to "King Wonjong" as of 1634"); Yi Kwang (Jeongye Daewongun, 1849); and Prince Heungseon (1864).

In 1650, Hyojong of Joseon, as requested by the prince regent Dorgon of the Qing dynasty, adopted a fourth cousin once removed as his daughter. Unusually, he gave her title, Princess Uisun, before she was about to leave Joseon to marry Dorgon.

=== Gojong and Sunjong / Korean Empire (1863–1896, 1897–1910) ===
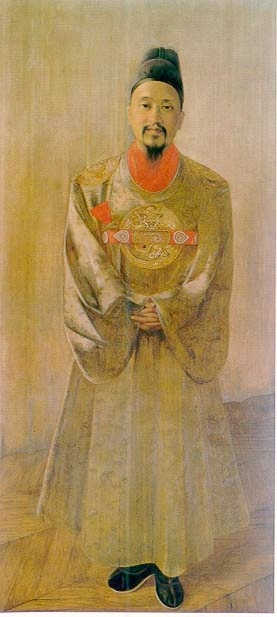
Emperor Gojong in 1898, painted by Hubert Vos

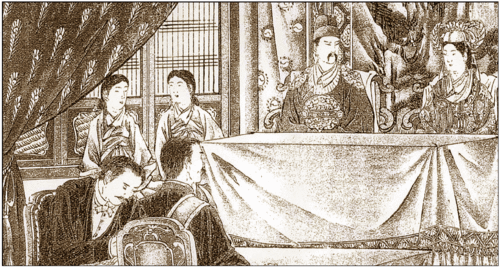
Japanese illustration of King Gojong and Queen Min receiving Inoue Kaoru

After the Meiji Restoration, Japan acquired Western military technology. With this power, it forced Joseon to sign the Japan–Korea Treaty of 1876 after the Ganghwa Island incident. It established a strong economic presence on the peninsula, heralding the beginning of Japanese imperial expansion in East Asia. In the 19th century tensions mounted between China and Japan, culminating in the First Sino-Japanese War; much of this war was fought on the Korean Peninsula. The Chinese defeat in the 1894 war resulted in the Treaty of Shimonoseki, which officially guaranteed Korea's independence from China. However, the treaty effectively granted Japan direct control over Korean politics.

The Joseon court, pressured by encroachment from larger powers, tried to reinforce national integrity and declared the Korean Empire in 1897. King Gojong of Korea assumed the title of Emperor in order to assert Korea's independence; he gave himself the rank of the leaders of China and Japan. In addition, Korea sought modern military technology from other foreign powers, especially Russia, in order to fend off the Japanese. Technically, 1895 marks the end of the Joseon period, as the official name of the state was changed. But the dynasty continued, although Japan intervened in its affairs. For example, the 1895 assassination of the queen consort, Queen Min, is believed to have been orchestrated by Japanese general Miura Gorō. The queen had great influence on politics during the reign of her husband, and she tried to maintain the neutrality of the country by accepting the offers from the Russian Empire, allowing the latter to have greater influence. After the death of the queen, the emperor honored her by posthumously promoting her status to empress (Empress Myeongseong).

As an emperor, Gojong granted higher titles to some of his close relatives, and so did his successor Sunjong. In 1900, Gojong designated his younger son Yi Kang as Prince Imperial Ui (의친왕) and Yi Un as Prince Imperial Yeong (영친왕). Yi Seon, their older half brother who died young in 1880, was posthumously designated in 1907 as Prince Imperial Wan (완친왕). Gojong designated his (biological) elder brother Yi Jae-myeon as Prince Imperial Heung (흥친왕) in 1910.

=== Japanese annexation ===
After a long-term process of controlling the puppet state, on 22 August 1910, Japan annexed the Korean peninsula and effectively ended rule by the House of Yi, forcing the nation to accede to the Japan–Korea Treaty of 1910. According to the treaty, some of the members of the Yi imperial clan were enfeoffed as kings and dukes (王公族, Ōkōzoku), positioning them below the Japanese imperial family but above the Japanese peerage, or ordinary nobility (朝鮮貴族, Chōsen-kizoku).

The noble titles granted by Japan in 1910, listing only those from Jeonju Yi clan, are as follows:

The Yi imperial clan in 1910
Empire of Japan	Korean Empire		Notes		
Title	Name	Title	Cadet branch	Genealogy	Lifetime
King Emeritus Yi of Deoksu	Yi Hui 이희(李㷩)	Emperor Emeritus (Gojong of Korea)	－	Heir to Crown Prince Hyomyeong; 2nd son of Heungseon Daewongun; 6-great-grandson of Grand Prince Inpyeong, the third son of King Injo	1852-1919
King Yi of Changdeok	Yi Cheok 이척(李坧)	Emperor (Sunjong of Korea)	－	2nd son of Gojong	1874-1926
Crown Prince of King Yi	Yi Un 이은(李垠)	Imperial Crown Prince	－	7th son of Gojong	1897-1970
Duke Yi Kang	Yi Kang 이강(李堈)	Prince Imperial Ui 의친왕(義親王)	－	5th son of Gojong	1877-1955
Duke Yi Hui	Yi Hui 이희(李熹)	Prince Imperial Heung 흥친왕(興親王)	House of Prince Yeonryeong	1st son of Heungseon Daewongun; 6-great-grandson of Grand Prince Inpyeong, the third son of King Injo	1845-1912
Marquess	Yi Hae-seung 이해승(李海昇)	Prince Cheongpung 청풍군(淸豐君)	House of Prince Euneon	Heir to Prince Pungseon; 14-great-grandson of Grand Prince Wolsan, a grandson of King Sejo	1890-?
Marquess	Yi Jae-gak 이재각(李載覺)	Prince Uiyang 의양군(義陽君)	House of Prince Eunjeon	3rd son of Prince Wanpyeong; 8-great-grandson of Prince Gyeongchang, the ninth son of King Seonjo	1874-1935
Marquess	Yi Jae-wan 이재완(李載完)	Prince Wansun 완순군(完順君)	House of Prince Yeonryeong	Heir to Prince Heungwan; 8-great-grandson of Prince Gyeongchang, the ninth son of King Seonjo	1856-1922
Marquess	Yi Hae-chang 이해창(李海昌)	Prince Changsan 창산군(昌山君)	House of Deokheung Daewongun	Heir to Yi Ha-geon, Prince Gyeongwon; 12-great-grandson of Deokheung Daewongun, the eighth son of King Jungjong	1865-1945
Count	Yi Ji-yong 이지용(李址鎔)	－	House of Prince Yeonryeong	Heir to Prince Wanyong; 15-great-grandson of Grand Prince Gwangpyeong, the fifth son of Sejong the Great	1870-1928
Viscount	Yi Byeong-mu 이병무(李秉武)	－	House of Prince Murim	2nd son of Yi Gung-han; 12-great-grandson of Prince Murim, the fifteenth son of King Jeongjong	1864-1926
Viscount	Yi Wan-yong 이완용(李完鎔)	－	House of Prince Euneon	Heir to Prince Deokan; 11-great-grandson of Deokheung Daewongun, the eighth son of King Jungjong	1872-1937
Viscount	Yi Gi-yong 이기용(李埼鎔)	－	House of Prince Yeonryeong	Son of Prince Wanrim; 7-great-grandson of Grand Prince Inpyeong, the third son of King Injo	1889-1961
Viscount	Yi Jae-gon 이재곤(李載崑)	－	House of Prince Gyeongchang	Son of Yi Sin-eung; 8-great-grandson of Prince Gyeongchang, the ninth son of King Seonjo	1859-1943
Viscount	Yi Geun-taek 이근택(李根澤)	－	House of Prince Gyeongmyeong	2nd son of Yi Min-seung; 11 great-grandson of Prince Gyeongmyeong, the eleventh son of King Seongjong	1865-1919
Baron	Yi Jong-geon 이종건(李鍾健)	－	House of Prince Murim	Adopted son of Yi Gyu-cheol; 10-great-grandson of Prince Murim, the fifteenth son of King Jeongjong	1843-1930
Baron	Yi Bong-ui 이봉의(李鳳儀)	－	House of Grand Prince Hyoryeong	Adopted son of Yi Gyeong-yu; 14-great-grandson of Grand Prince Hyoryeong, the second son of King Taejong	1839-1919
Baron	Yi Jae-geuk 이재극(李載克)	－	House of Grand Prince Neungchang	Son of Yi Yeon-eung; 6-great-grandson of Grand Prince Inpyeong, the third son of King Injo	1864-1931
Baron	Yi Geun-ho 이근호(李根澔)	－	House of Prince Gyeongmyeong	1st son of Yi Min-seung; 11 great-grandson of Prince Gyeongmyeong, the eleventh son of King Seongjong	1860-1923
Baron	Yi Geun-sang 이근상(李根湘)	－	House of Prince Gyeongmyeong	4th son of Yi Min-seung; 11 great-grandson of Prince Gyeongmyeong, the eleventh son of King Seongjong	1874-1920
Baron	Yi Yong-tae 이용태(李容泰)	－	House of Prince Milseong	Son of Yi Byeong-ro; 12-great-grandson of Prince Milseong, the twelfth son of Sejong the Great	1854-1922
Baron	Yi Yong-won 이용원(李容元)	－	House of Prince Milseong	Adopted son of Yi Byeong-um; 12-great-grandson of Prince Milseong, the twelfth son of Sejong the Great	1832-1911
Baron	Yi Geon-ha 이건하(李乾夏)	－	House of Grand Prince Muan	Adopted son of Yi Yin-wu; 14-great-grandson of Grand Prince Gwangpyeong, the fifth son of Sejong the Great	1835-1913

=== Under Japanese colonial rule ===
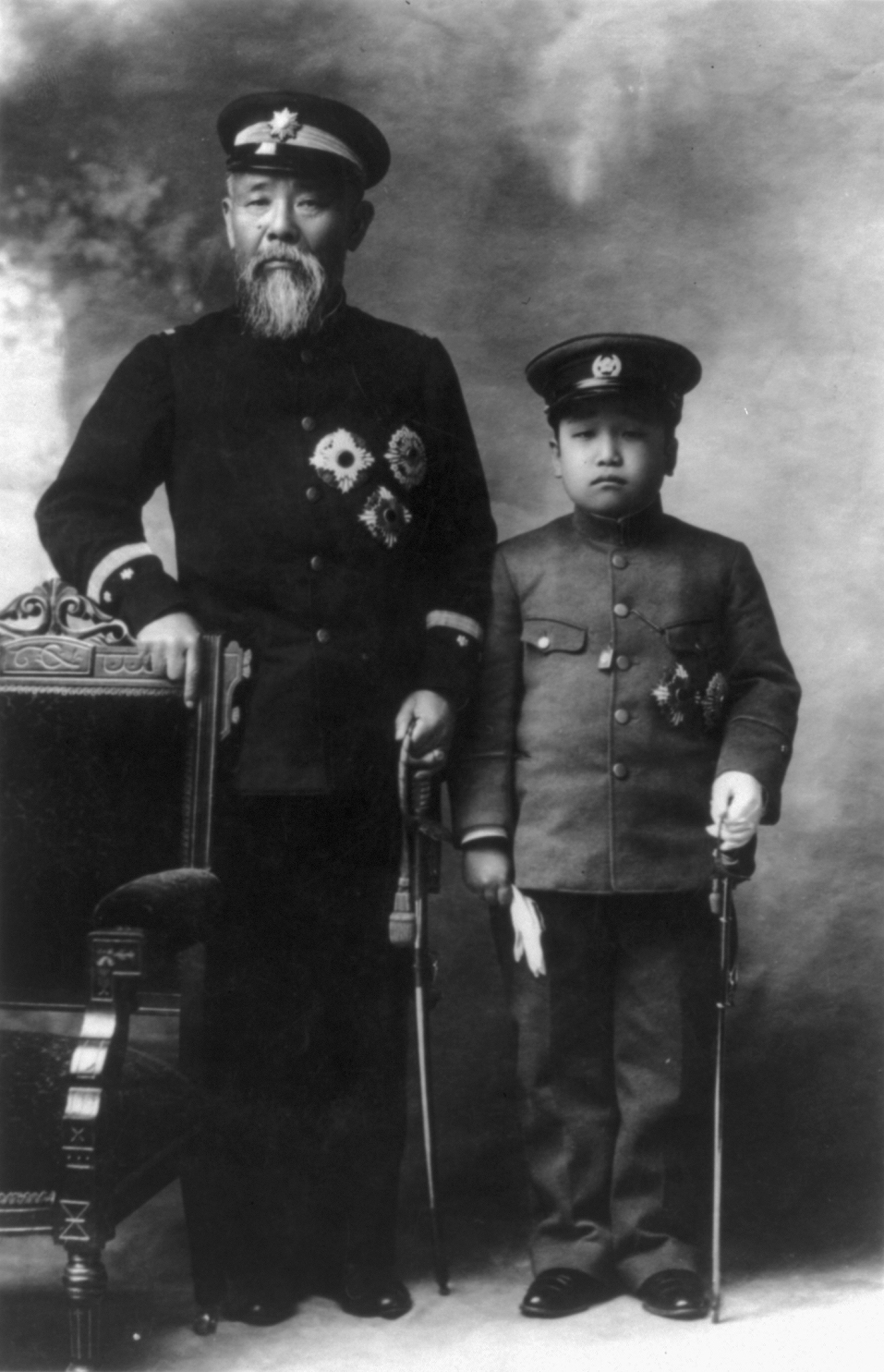
Crown Prince Yi Un with Itō Hirobumi, 1907

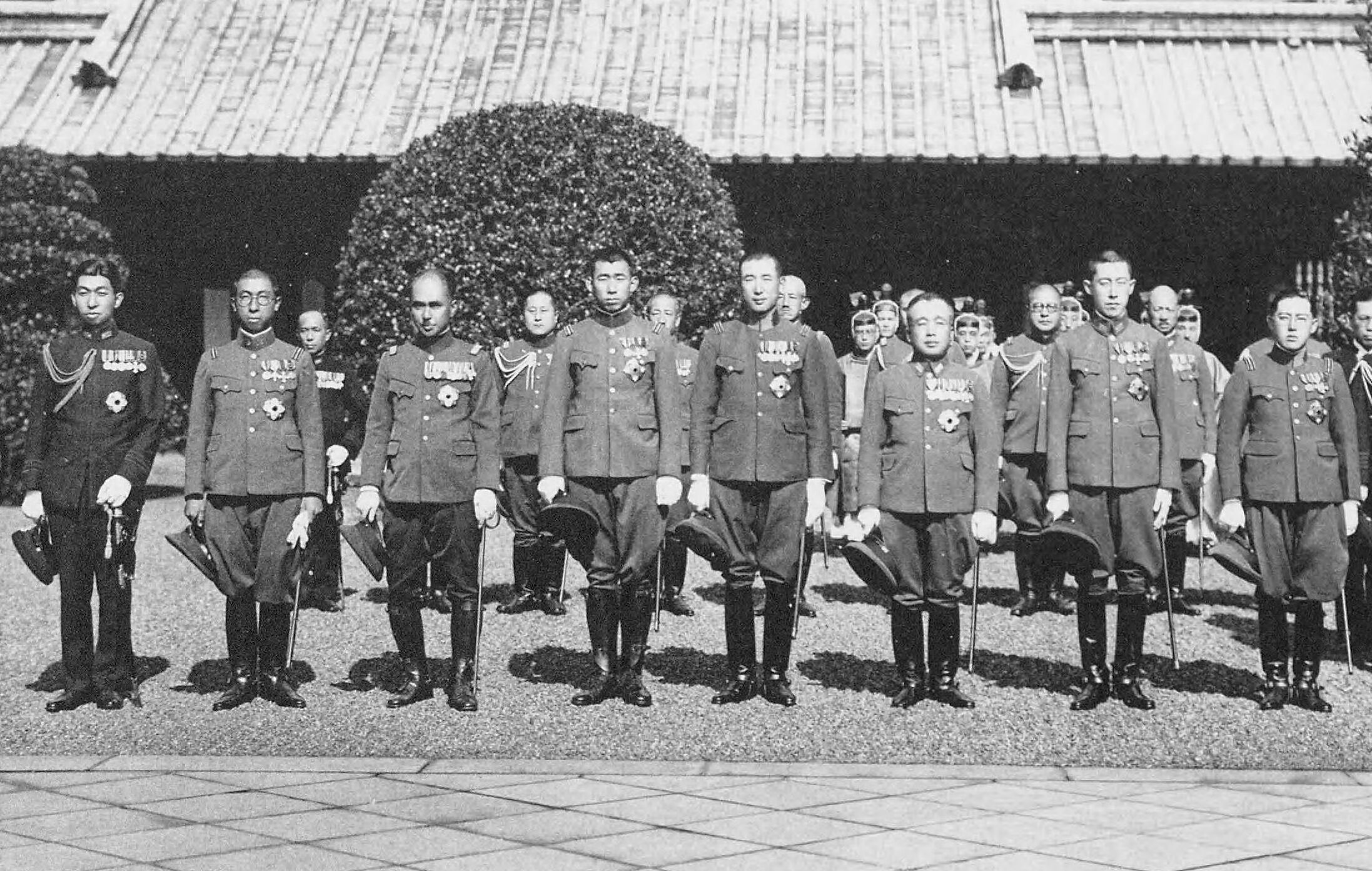
From right to left: Korean princes Yi U, Yi Geon and Yi Un as officers of the Imperial Japanese Army, together with members of the Japanese imperial family at the Yasukuni Shrine, 1938

Emperor Gojong had nine sons, but only three princes who survived to adulthood: the second son, Crown Prince Yi Cheok; the fifth son, Yi Kang, and the seventh son, Yi Un. The Crown Prince, Yi Cheok, became Emperor Sunjong, the last monarch of the Korean Empire. Since Emperor Sunjong never had issue, his younger brother, Yi Un, the Prince Imperial Yeong became the new Imperial Crown Prince. Yi Kang (Prince Imperial Ui) might have taken the position due to his seniority but was passed over - due to the low status of Yi Kang's biological mother, Lady Chang, as well as the notorious fame of Yi Kang himself known not only domestically but also internationally. Yi Kang fathered 13 sons and 9 daughters by 14 mistresses; the number can be different based on difference sources. With an extremely wide range of historical evaluations over him — womanizer, as well as a behind-the-scene leader of the independence movement — the Japanese authorities limited the activities of the prince throughout the occupation.

Emperor Sunjong died in 1926, Crown Prince Yi Un was called "King Yi", a nominal title because the country had already lost its sovereignty to Japan. Yi Un married a Japanese princess, Princess Masako of Nashimoto, who was later known as Yi Bangja, a family member of the shinnōke (cadet branch from the Imperial House of Japan). After they married, Princess Masako gave birth to Yi Jin in 1921 (died young) and Yi Ku in 1931.

Many members of the Korean imperial family lived in Japan during colonial rule. The last princess of Korea Deokhye, was taken to Japan at a young age, she later married the Japanese count and politician Sō Takeyuki. During the Second World War, princes of the Korean imperial family served as officers of the Imperial Japanese Army. Crown Prince Yi Un achieved the rank of Lieutenant General, commanded Japanese forces in China and became a member of the Supreme War Council. Prince Yi Geon, the first son of Yi Kang, served as a cavalry officer, achieved the rank of Colonel at the end of the war and lived the remainder of his life in Japan. Prince Yi U, the second son of Yi Kang, served as a General Staff Officer with the rank of Lieutenant Colonel when he was killed in the atomic bombing of Hiroshima.

=== Post-liberation ===
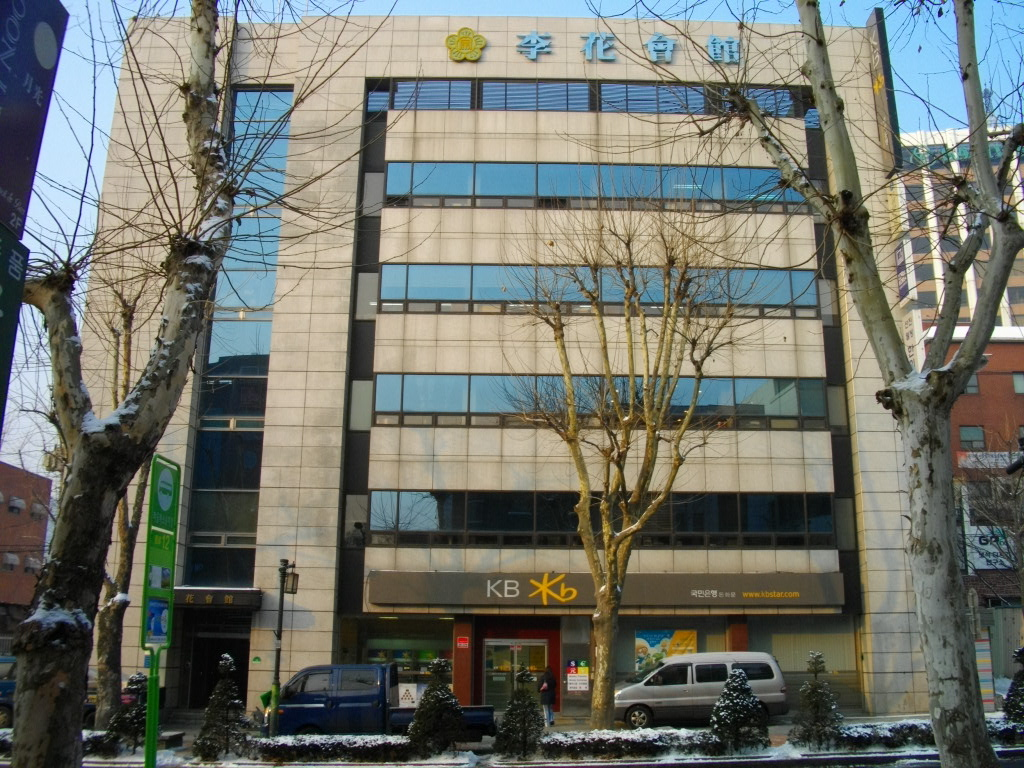
Headquarters of the Jeonju Lee Royal Family Association, in Seoul

After Korea's liberation in 1945, President Syngman Rhee, of the House of Yi, suppressed the imperial family, in order to prevent the restoration of the monarchy. Stripped of most of their wealth and authority, some mainline family members, such as Yi Haegyeong, fled to the United States and Latin America, known descendants reside in New Jersey and New York. The Jeonju Lee Royal Family Association was founded in 1922 by Prince Imperial Ui, and later registered in South Korea as of 1957, with the members consist of the descendants of the royal family from various cadet branches of the clan.

It was only in 1963 that a new president, Park Chung Hee, allowed some of the imperial family members, including Princess Deokhye, to return to Korea. Yi Un also became the director of the Jeonju Lee Royal Family Association, on 29 July 1966, and he died in 1970; the title would later pass down to his son Yi Ku in 1973, who died on July 16, 2005. Prior to his death, Jeonju Lee Royal Family Association was to designate an heir to succeed him.

Within the descendants of the Emperor Gojong, Yi Jun came from the most senior line as the heir of Sadonggung Palace, the seat of Prince Imperial Ui; however, Yi Jun being the heir to Sadonggung Palace making him to reject the offer to succeed Yi Ku, so his younger first cousin, Yi Won, instead became the Yi Ku's successor and the status was confirmed by the association as of 22 July 2005. Although, the posthumous adoption would be invalid by present Korean Law and is only with traditional significance.

After the death of Yi Ku, a dispute about the head of the royal family occurred. Yi Hae-won, second daughter of Yi Kang and a half-aunt of Yi Won, made a counter-claim as the "Empress of Korea" in a private ceremony, and she died in 2020. Yi Seok, the 10th son of Yi Kang and a half-uncle of Yi Won, claimed to be the heir apparent is referred as "king," "prince," and/or "last pretender" by certain media; later, he passed such claim to an American, Andrew Lee.

== Family tree ==
Joseon Kings and Korean Emperors family tree

– – – – – – - The dashed lines denote the adoptions

(1204–1274); Yi An-sa (Mokjo)
(1236–?); Yi Haeng-ni (Ikjo)
(1265–1342); Yi Ch'un (Dojo)
(1315–1361); Yi Cha-ch'un (Hwanjo)
KING OF; JOSEON
(1335–1408) Taejo r. 1392–1398^{(1)}
(1357–1419) Jeongjong r. 1398–1400^{(2)}	(1367–1422) Taejong r. 1400–1418^{(3)} (Note: Taejong was the first reigning Joseon king to be recognized by the Ming dynasty under the tributary system.)
(1397–1450) Sejong the Great r. 1418–1450^{(4)}
(1414–1452) Munjong r. 1450–1452^{(5)}	(1417–1468) Sejo r. 1455–1468^{(7)}
(1441–1457) Danjong r. 1452–1455^{(6)}	(1438–1457); Crown Prince; Uigyeong	(1450–1469) Yejong r. 1468–1469^{(8)}
(1457–1494) Seongjong r. 1469–1494^{(9)}
(1476–1506) Yeonsangun r. 1494–1506^{(10)} (Note: Unlike other Joseon monarchs, who could receive a temple name after their death, Yeonsangun and Gwanghaegun never had one due to being overthrown and gun denotes "prince" instead of king.)	(1486–1544) Jungjong r. 1506–1544^{(11)}
(1515–1545) Injong r. 1544–1545^{(12)}	(1530–1559); Deokheung; Daewongun	(1534–1567) Myeongjong r. 1545–1567^{(13)}
(1552–1608) Seonjo r. 1567–1608^{(14)}
(1575–1641) Gwanghaegun r. 1608–1623^{(15)}	(1580–1619); Prince; Jeongwon	(1598–1624); Prince; Heungan (Note: The anti-king during the rebel (Yi Gwal's rebellion) in 1624.)
(1595–1649) Injo r. 1623–1649^{(16)} (Note: After the Qing invasion of Joseon, Injo was recognized by the Qing dynasty instead of the Ming dynasty, under the tributary system.)	(1599–1615); Grand Prince; Neungchang
(1619–1659) Hyojong r. 1649–1659^{(17)}	(1622–1658); Grand Prince; Inpyeong
(1641–1674) Hyeonjong r. 1659–1674^{(18)}	(1639–1670); Prince; Boknyeong
(1661–1720) Sukjong r. 1674–1720^{(19)}	(1661–1722); Prince; Uiwon
(1688–1724) Gyeongjong r. 1720–1724^{(20)}	(1694–1776) Yeongjo r. 1724–1776^{(21)}	(1699–1719); Prince; Yeollyeong	(1693–1763); Prince; Anheung
(1719–1728); Crown Prince; Hyojang	(1735–1762); Crown Prince; Sado	(1728–1796); Yi Jin-ik
(1752–1800) Jeongjo r. 1776–1800^{(22)}	(1754–1801); Prince Euneon	(1755–1771); Prince; Eunsin	(1752–1822); Yi Byeong-won
(1790–1834) Sunjo r. 1800–1834^{(23)}	(1785–1841); Jeongye; Daewongun	(1788–1836); Prince; Namyeon
(1809–1830); Crown Prince; Hyomyeong	(1831–1864) Cheoljong r. 1849–1864^{(25)}	(1821–1898); Heungseon; Daewongun
(1827–1849) Heonjong r. 1834–1849^{(24)}
EMPEROR OF; KOREA
(1852–1919) Gojong r.K 1863–1897 r.E 1897–1907^{(26)} (Note: Gojong became the first emperor of the Korean Empire in 1897 and abdicated in 1907; he was demoted to "King Emeritus Yi" in 1910.)
(1874–1926) Sunjong r. 1907–1910^{(27)} (Note: Sunjong abdicated in 1910 and became "King Yi" at the same time.)	(1877–1955); Prince Imperial Ui; Yi Kang (Note: Even though Prince Imperial Ui was the heir presumptive to Emperor Sunjong, under the influence of the Japanese Resident-General, he didn't become the crown prince.)	(1897–1970) Prince Imperial Yeong; Yi Un (Note: Yi Un became the Imperial Crown Prince of the Korean Empire in 1907, only to be demoted to the "Crown Prince of King Yi" in 1910. He succeeded the title King Yi in 1926 and lost it in 1947 according to the new constitution in Japan. His posthumous name, Crown Prince Euimin (의민황태자), was made by the Jeonju Lee Royal Family Association.)
(1909–1990) Yi Geon	(1919–1984) Yi Gon	(1938–2014); Yi Gap	(1931–2005) Yi Ku (Note: Director of the Jeonju Lee Royal Family Association.) (Note: Yi Ku became the "Crown Prince of King Yi" after his birth and he lost the title in 1947. His posthumous name, Imperial Grandson Hoeun(회은황세손), was made by the Jeonju Lee Royal Family Association.)
(1961–) Yi Jun	(1962–) Yi Won (Note: In 2005, Yi Won was appointed as the heir to Yi Ku by the Jeonju Lee Royal Family Association.)

== Notes ==
— Royal house — House of Yi Founding year: 1392
Preceded by House of Wang	Ruling House of Korea; 1392–1910	Vacant Rule ended in 1910 (Japanese annexation)
