= Yi Won =

Korean pretender to the throne (born 1962)

Yi Won: 이원
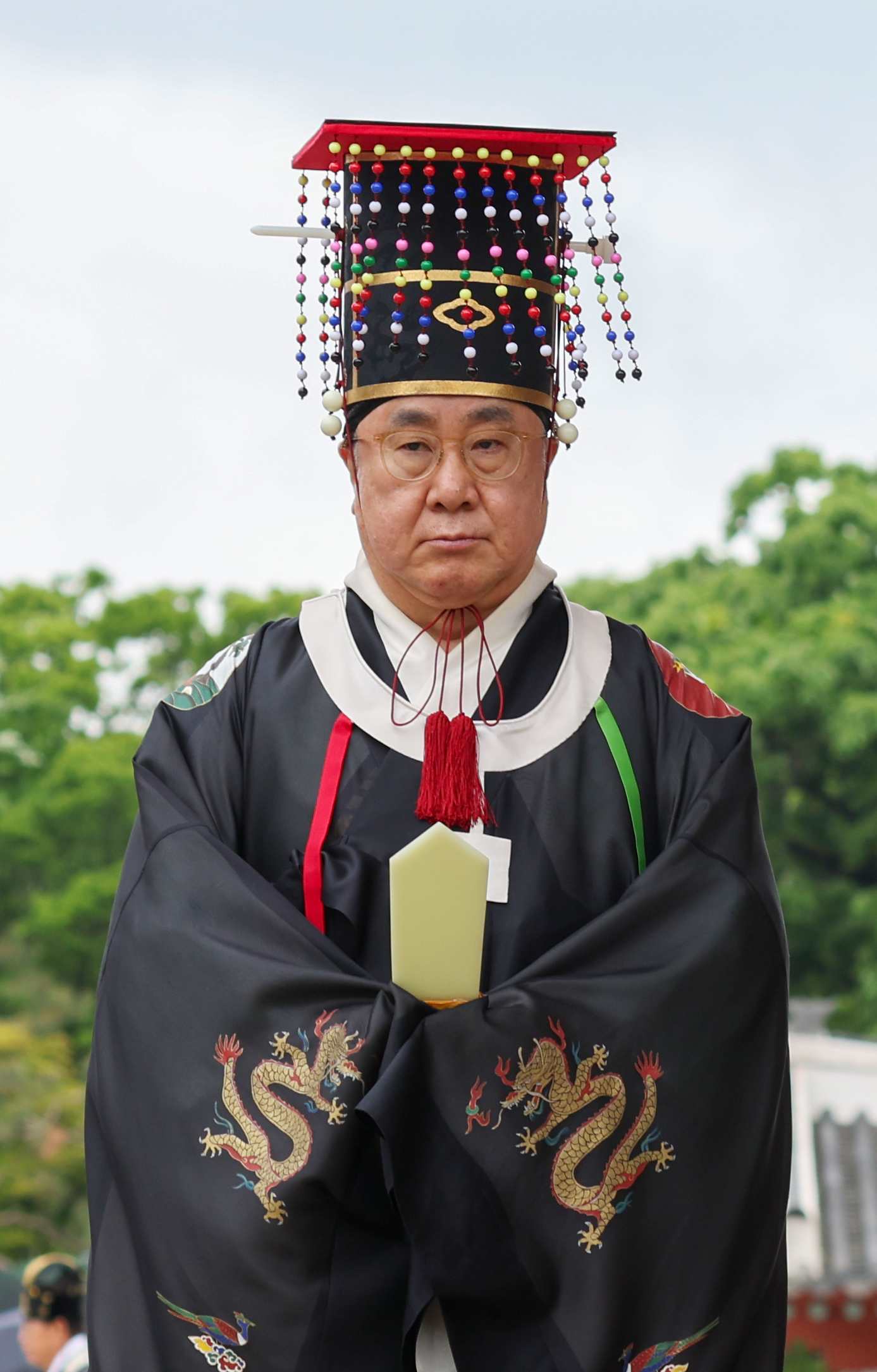
- Yi in 2026

Head of the House of Yi (disputed)
- Period: 16 July 2005 – present
- Predecessor: Yi Ku
- Born: 23 September 1962 (age 64); Hyehwa-dong, Jongno District, Seoul, South Korea
- Spouse: Cho Tŭng-hak
- Issue: Yi Kwon; Yi Yeong
Names
- Yi Sang-hyŏp
- Father: Yi Gap
- Mother: Yi Gyeong-suk
- Religion: Roman Catholicism

- Yi Won
- Hangul: 이원
- Hanja: 李源
- RR: I Won
- MR: I Wŏn

Yi Won (Korean: 이원; born Yi Sang-Hyeob; 23 September 1962) is one of the great-grandsons of Gojong of Korea and one of several who claim to be current head of the House of Yi but is not accepted by the imperial family of Korea.

== Biography ==
Yi Won was born as the eldest son of Yi Gap, the 9th son of Prince Yi Kang by one of his partners at Hyehwa-dong, Jongno District, Seoul. He attended the Sangmun High School during 1979–1981 and completed studies in broadcasting at the New York Institute of Technology, United States. He and his wife have had two children, the eldest son, Yi Kwon, born in 1998; the other son, Yi Yeong, born in 1999.

He worked as a general manager of Hyundai Home Shopping, a Hyundai Department Store Group company, until Prince Yi Ku died on 16 July 2005. After the death of Yi Ku, the Jeonju Lee Royal Family Association appointed him as the Imperial Ritual Master(Hwangsason) of the association. Officially, as noble titles aren't recognized by the Constitution of South Korea, Yi Won is by birth a citizen in South Korea.

He currently lives in an apartment in Wondang, Goyang, South Korea with his family.

== Adoption controversy ==
Following the death of Yi Ku on 16 July 2005, the Jeonju Lee Royal Family Association asked Yi Jun, the eldest great-grandsons of Emperor Gojong, but Yi Jun declined the request as he stated that it is not approporiate for the heir of Prince Imperial Ui to succeed the lineage of Prince Imperial Yeong, the younger brother of his grandfather So Yi Jun's younger cousin brother, Yi Won was appointed as the Imperial Ritual Master(Hwangsason) of the association.

This claim was contested by his half-uncle, Yi Seok and a half-aunt, Yi Hae-won, who was crowned "Empress of Korea" by some of her relatives. In spite of this, he is annually called on to take the place of the sovereign at the Jongmyo jerye ceremonies performing rites to his royal ancestors.

Those who dispute the legitimacy of the adoption claim that consent for the adoption of Yi Won was not given by other members of Imperial House, including Yi Seok, the younger half-brother of Prince Gap, and Yi Hae-won, the eldest member of the house until her death in 2020. Also, Yi Ku died before the adoption process could complete; as such, according to present Korean law, a traditional posthumous adoption was no longer recognized by legislation as of 2004.

== Patrilineal descent ==
Patrilineal descent
1. Yi Han, d. 754?
2. Yi Jayeon
3. Yi Cheonsang
4. Yi Gwanghui
5. Yi Ipjeon
6. Yi Geunghyu
7. Yi Yeomsoon
8. Yi Seung-sak
9. Yi Chung-kyung
10. Yi Kyung-young
11. Yi Chung-min
12. Yi Hwa
13. Yi Jinyu
14. Yi Gung-jin
15. Yi Yong-bu
16. Yi Rin
17. Yi Yang-mu, d. 1231
18. Yi An-sa, d. 1274
19. Yi Haeng-ni
20. Yi Chun, d. 1342
21. Yi Jachun, 1315–1361
22. Taejo of Joseon, 1335–1408
23. Taejong of Joseon, 1367–1422
24. Sejong of Joseon, 1397–1450
25. Sejo of Joseon, 1417–1468
26. Crown Prince Uigyeong, 1438–1457
27. Seongjong of Joseon, 1457–1495
28. Jungjong of Joseon, 1488–1544
29. Grand Internal Prince Deokheung, 1530–1559
30. Seonjo of Joseon, 1552–1608
31. Prince Jeongwon, 1580–1619
32. Injo of Joseon, 1595–1649
33. Grand Prince Inpyeong, 1622–1658
34. Prince Boknyeong, 1639–1670
35. Yi Hyuk, Prince Uiwon, 1661–1722
36. Yi Sook, Prince Anheung, 1693–1768
37. Yi Jin-ik, 1728–1796
38. Yi Byeong-won, 1752–1822
39. Yi Gu, Prince Namyeon, 1788–1836
40. Grand Internal Prince Heungseon, 1820–1898
41. Gojong of Korea, 1852–1919
42. Prince Yi Kang, 1877–1955
43. Yi Gap, 1938–2014
44. Yi Won, b. 1962

== See also ==
- House of Yi
- Joseon dynasty

Yi Won House of Yi Born: 23 September 1962
Cultural offices
Vacant Title last held by Yi Ku	Director of the Jeonju Lee; Royal Family Association; 27 June 2007 – present	Incumbent
Titles in pretence
Preceded by Yi Ku	— TITULAR — Emperor of Korea; 16 July 2005 – present Reason for succession failure: Empire abolished in 1910	Incumbent
