= Jeonju Lee Royal Family Association =

Organization in South Korea

Jeonju Lee Royal Family Association 전주이씨대동종약원 全州李氏大同宗約院
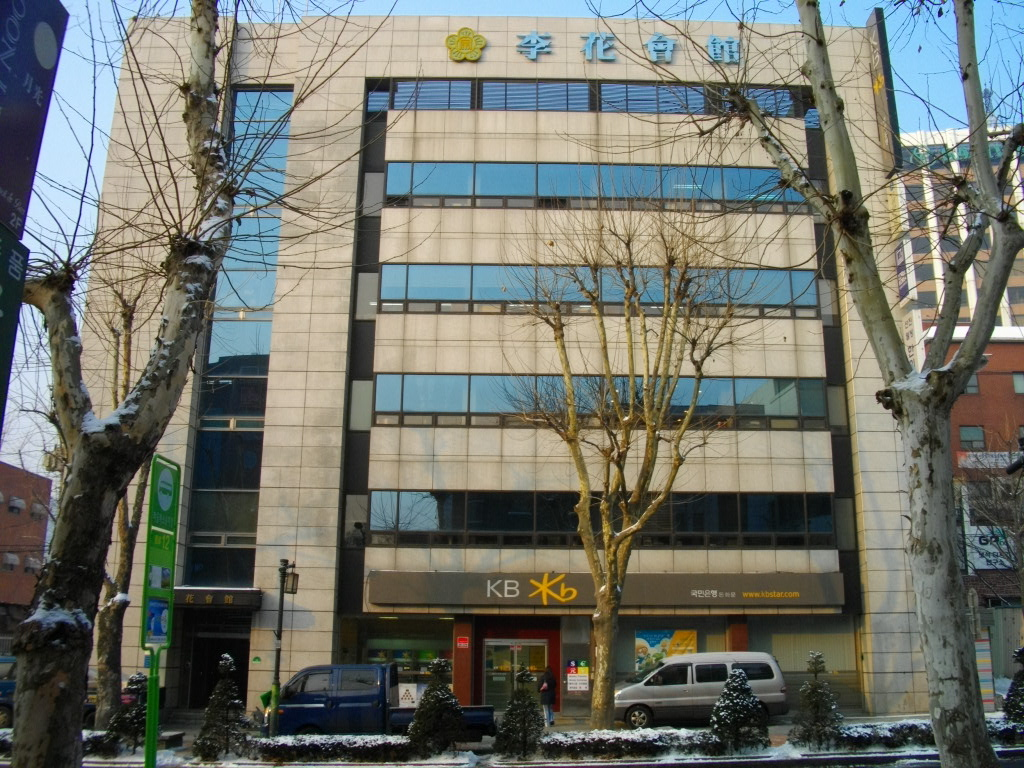
- Main office
- Founded: 3 April 1957; 69 years ago
- Type: Family association
- Location: Seoul, South Korea
- Key people: Lee Gwi-nam (chairman)
- Website: rfo.co.kr

The Jeonju Lee Royal Family Association (Korean: 전주이씨대동종약원) is a family association based in South Korea founded by the Jeonju Yi (Lee) clan, the household of Joseon and the Korean Empire, which previously ruled Korea. The association originated from several national institutions of the Joseon dynasty. Its recent main activities following World War II include holding annual Jongmyo jerye, the worship rites of the royal ancestors, and compiling genealogy books of the descendants from the House of Yi.

== History ==
The king Taejo of Joseon started his reign in 1392, and some of the institution setups included an office to handle affairs regarding the royal family. The policy was continued by his son, Taejong of Joseon, who created the "Office of Royal Genealogy" (宗簿寺, 종부시) in 1401. The office existed for centuries, and a reformation was executed in 1864, during the reign of King Gojong. It was eventually abolished in 1907.

After the Japan–Korea Treaty of 1910, the former emperor Sunjong of Korea issued a decree, allowing the descendants of the royal family to form a private organization so as to strengthen the relationship within the clan, and his half-brother Prince Imperial Ui was recognized as the founder of the said organization, which had a collection from Emperor Sunjong, including a commemorative plaque with Sunjong's Chinese calligraphy handwriting on it, which reads 崇祖惇宗 (숭조돈종, "respect the ancestor and harmony with the clan"), but the plaque went missing during the Korean War. On 27 November 1955, the year when Yi Kang passed away, the members of the Jeonju Lee Royal Family Association held a ceremony in the hall of Whimoon Middle School in Seoul, to be officially registered as a legal organization on 3 April 1957. The Association's headquarters are in the Lee Hwa Building (이화회관 [李花會館], "Plum Blossom Hall"), located in Jongno District of Seoul, on the street leading to the main gate of Changdeokgung.

In addition to domestic offices, the association has several international branches, including seven offices in North America and one in Japan.

== Organization ==
According to the statistics in 1995, there were 2.8 million people coming from the Jeonju Yi clan in South Korea, making up over 770 thousand Yi families, 230 thousand families from whom lived in Seoul. Among them, there were nationwide 44% population from the clan (330 thousand families) that are registered members of the Jeonju Lee Royal Family Association; in Seoul, similarly, there were specifically 39% (90 thousand families) of the clan that were registered.

Within the association, there is a chairman, as the superior over vice-chairmen, supervisors, and members of the council; they are often family members with prominent figures in politics and/or economics. As various ways to support members from the clan, there are several sub-organizations, including one that can offer scholarship, committees for academics and art, as well as ones dedicated to ancestral worship activities. Based on different genealogy among family members, 83 groups of the member can be classified; based on the places of residence, there are 15 sub-associations and 225 offices set, and there are also, for further district subdivision, branches in smaller administrative units (myeon, eup, and dong). As to overseas sub-associations, there are ones in Japan (Kantō and Kansai offices) and the United States (including Chicago and Los Angeles offices).

Statistics for the offices of the association (1995)
Location	No. of offices
Seoul	22
Busan	12
Daegu	7
Incheon	6
Daejeon	5
Gyeonggi Province	29
Gangwon Province	18
North Chungcheong Province	12
South Chungcheong Province	16
North Jeolla Province	18
South Jeolla Province	25
North Gyeongsang Province	23
South Gyeongsang Province	25
Jeju Province	3
Japan	2
United States	2
Total	225

== List of directors ==
Directors (총재) of the Jeonju Lee Royal Family Association
	Portrait	Title		Name	In office since	Birth and death	Notes
	Portrait	Korean	English	Name	In office since	Birth and death	Notes
1		의친왕 義親王	Prince Imperial Ui	Yi Kang	1922	1877–1955	5th son of Gojong of Korea; Made Prince Uihwa in 1891; Becoming Prince Imperial Ui in 1900
2		영친왕 英親王	Prince Imperial Yeong	Yi Un	29 July 1966	1897–1970	7th son of Gojong of Korea; Becoming Prince Imperial Yeong in 1900; Appointed by Emperor Sunjong of Korea as the Imperial Crown Prince in 1907
After Korean Empire being abolished (1910) and the foundation of the Republic of Korea (1948), the titles ever since are of pretence and for courtesy within the association.
3		황세손 皇世孫	Imperial Crown Prince	Yi Ku	20 March 1973	1931–2005	2nd son of Yi Un; Born as the Crown Prince of King Yi
4		황사손 皇嗣孫	Hereditary Prince Imperial	Yi Won	27 June 2007	born 1961	Great-grandson of Gojong of Korea; Heir to Yi Ku; Grandson of Yi Kang and the eldest son of Yi Gap (9th son of Yi Kang); Later going by the style Hereditary Prince Imperial (황사손) only instead of the director

== List of chairmen of the association ==
Chairmen (이사장) of the Jeonju Lee Royal Family Association
	Name		Tenure	From the cadet branch	Birth and death	Ref(s)
	Korean	English	Tenure	From the cadet branch	Birth and death	Ref(s)
1	이범승 李範昇	Lee Beom-seung	7 November 1955 – 9 February 1958	Grand Prince Gwangpyeong; 17th generation	1887–1976	
2	리기붕 李起鵬	Lee Ki-poong	10 February 1958 – 3 April 1959	Grand Prince Hyoryeong; 17th generation	1896–1960	
3	이세정 李世楨	Yi Se-jeong	25 December 1962 – 4 March 1970	Prince Ikyang; 15th generation	1895–1972	
4	이세정 李世楨	Yi Se-jeong	25 December 1962 – 4 March 1970	Prince Ikyang; 15th generation	1895–1972	
5	이세정 李世楨	Yi Se-jeong	25 December 1962 – 4 March 1970	Prince Ikyang; 15th generation	1895–1972	
6	이건웅 李建雄	Yi Geon-ung	20 March 1970 – 20 September 1970 (acting)	Prince Deokcheon; 15th generation	born 1941	
7	이수길 李壽吉	Yi Su-gil	12 February 1971 – 12 May 1974	Grand Prince Inpyeong; 10th generation	1917–1982	(Note: Yi Su-gil (이수길) was by birth the 5th son of Prince Yi Kang, and by extension a grandson of Gojong, but he was later adopted as the heir to Baron Yi Yin-yong (이인용, 1907-1950); therefore his genealogy goes by his adoptive father. He was also known as other names, including Yi Ju (이주/李鑄).)
8	이봉우 李鳳宇	Yi Bong-u	15 April 1975 － 12 May 1977	Grand Prince Hyoryeong; 15th generation		
9	이재형 李載灐	Lee Choi-hyung	13 May 1977 – 30 January 1992	Prince Inseong; 10th generation	1914–1992	
10	이재형 李載灐	Lee Choi-hyung	13 May 1977 – 30 January 1992	Prince Inseong; 10th generation	1914–1992	
11	이재형 李載灐	Lee Choi-hyung	13 May 1977 – 30 January 1992	Prince Inseong; 10th generation	1914–1992	
12	이재형 李載灐	Lee Choi-hyung	13 May 1977 – 30 January 1992	Prince Inseong; 10th generation	1914–1992	
13	이범준 李範俊	Rhee Bomb-june	1 February 1992 – 20 September 1996	Grand Prince Gwangpyeong; 17th generation	1928–2007	
14	이범준 李範俊	Rhee Bomb-june	1 February 1992 – 20 September 1996	Grand Prince Gwangpyeong; 17th generation	1928–2007	
15	이환의 李桓儀	Lee Hwan-ey	31 September 1996 – 3 January 2012	Grand Prince Hyoryeong; 16th generation	born 1931	
16	이환의 李桓儀	Lee Hwan-ey	31 September 1996 – 3 January 2012	Grand Prince Hyoryeong; 16th generation	born 1931	
17	이환의 李桓儀	Lee Hwan-ey	31 September 1996 – 3 January 2012	Grand Prince Hyoryeong; 16th generation	born 1931	
18	이환의 李桓儀	Lee Hwan-ey	31 September 1996 – 3 January 2012	Grand Prince Hyoryeong; 16th generation	born 1931	
19	이환의 李桓儀	Lee Hwan-ey	31 September 1996 – 3 January 2012	Grand Prince Hyoryeong; 16th generation	born 1931	
20	이환의 李桓儀	Lee Hwan-ey	31 September 1996 – 3 January 2012	Grand Prince Hyoryeong; 16th generation	born 1931	
21	이태섭 李台燮	Lee Tae-sup	4 January 2012 – 17 December 2019	Prince Deokyang; 14th generation	born 1939	
22	이태섭 李台燮	Lee Tae-sup	4 January 2012 – 17 December 2019	Prince Deokyang; 14th generation	born 1939	
23	이태섭 李台燮	Lee Tae-sup	4 January 2012 – 17 December 2019	Prince Deokyang; 14th generation	born 1939	
24	이태섭 李台燮	Lee Tae-sup	4 January 2012 – 17 December 2019	Prince Deokyang; 14th generation	born 1939	
25	이귀남 李貴男	Lee Gwi-nam	18 December 2019 – present	Prince Hoesan; 17th generation	born 1951	
26	이귀남 李貴男	Lee Gwi-nam	18 December 2019 – present	Prince Hoesan; 17th generation	born 1951	
27	이귀남 李貴男	Lee Gwi-nam	18 December 2019 – present	Prince Hoesan; 17th generation	born 1951	

== See also ==
- Kungnaebu
- Office of the Yi Dynasty
- Cultural Heritage Administration
