= Yi Haegyeong =

South Korean royal (born 1930)

Yi Hae-gyeong (이해경, 李海瓊; born 1930) is the 5th daughter of Prince Yi Kang. Yi is the granddaughter of Emperor Gojong of the Korean Empire who reigned from 1863 to 1907. She resides in New York City since 1956, working in Columbia University in charge of a famous collection of Asian literature, from which she eventually retired in 1996.
