= Grand Prince Hyoryŏng =

Joseon Prince

Yi Po 이보
- Grand Prince Hyoryŏng
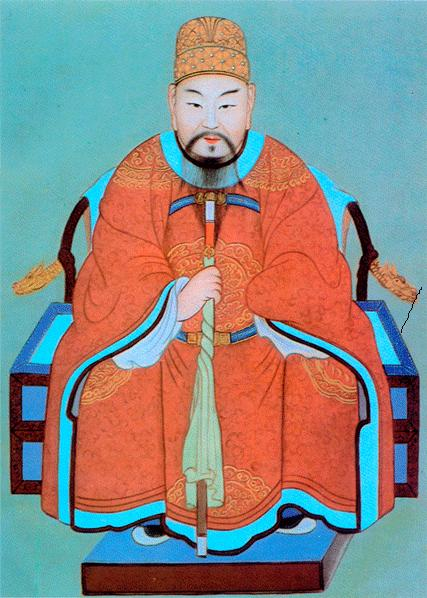
- Born: 29 January 1396; Hanseong, Joseon
- Died: 22 June 1486 (aged 90); Shindong-myeon, Siheung County, Gyeonggi Province, Joseon
- Burial: Bangbae-dong, Seocho District, Seoul, South Korea
- Consort: Grand Princess Consort Yeseong of the Haeju Jeong clan (m.1407–d.1470)
- Clan: Jeonju Yi clan
- Dynasty: House of Yi
- Father: Taejong of Joseon
- Mother: Queen Wongyeong
- Religion: Korean Confucianism (Neo-Confucianism), later Korean Buddhism

Korean name
- Hangul: 이보
- Hanja: 李補
- RR: I Bo
- MR: I Po

Royal title
- Hangul: 효령대군
- Hanja: 孝寧大君
- RR: Hyoryeong daegun
- MR: Hyoryŏng taegun

Art name
- Hangul: 연강
- Hanja: 蓮江
- RR: Yeongang
- MR: Yŏn'gang

Courtesy name
- Hangul: 선숙
- Hanja: 善叔
- RR: Seonsuk
- MR: Sŏnsuk

Posthumous name
- Hangul: 정효
- Hanja: 靖孝
- RR: Jeonghyo
- MR: Chŏnghyo

Former name
- Hangul: 이호
- Hanja: 李祜
- RR: I Ho
- MR: I Ho

Grand Prince Hyoryŏng (Korean: 효령대군; Hanja: 孝寧大君; 29 January 1396 – 22 June 1486), personal name Yi Po (이보; 李補), was the second son of King Taejong of Joseon and his wife, Queen Wongyeong. He was the elder brother of Sejong the Great.

== Family ==
- Father
  - King Taejong of Joseon (조선 태종; 16 May 1367 – 10 May 1422)
- Mother
  - Queen Wongyeong of the Yeoheung Min clan (원경왕후 민씨; 11 July 1365 – 10 July 1420)
- Siblings
  - Older sister: Princess Jeongsun (정순공주; 1385–1460)
  - Older sister: Princess Gyeongseong (경정공주; 1387–1455)
  - Older brother: Grand Prince Yi Il-nam (대군 이일남; 李一男; 1389)
  - Older brother: Grand Prince Yi Yi-nam (대군 이이남; 李二男; 1390)
  - Older brother: Grand Prince Yi Sam-nam (대군 이삼남; 李三男; 1392)
  - Older sister: Princess Gyeongan (경안공주; 1393 – 22 April 1415)
  - Older brother: Yi Je, Grand Prince Yangnyeong (양녕대군 이제; 1394–1462)
  - Younger brother: King Sejong of Joseon (세종 대왕; 1397–1450)
    - Sister-in-law: Queen Soheon of the Cheongseong Shim clan (소헌왕후 심씨; 12 October 1395 – 19 April 1446)
  - Younger sister: Princess Jeongseon (정선공주; 1404–1424)
  - Younger brother: Yi Jong, Grand Prince Seongnyeong (성녕대군 이종; 1405–1418)
  - Younger brother: Grand Prince Yi Chung (대군 이충; 1407–1453)
- Consorts and their respective issue:
1. Grand Princess Consort Yeseong of the Haeju Jeong clan (예성부부인 해주 정씨; 1394–1470); (Note: She was the aunt of Princess Gyeonghye's husband and of Grand Prince Yeongeung's wife, Princess Consort Chunseong as well as a grandmother-in-law) eldest daughter of Jeong Yeok (정역; 鄭易; 1367–1425)
  1. Yi Chae, Prince Uiseong (의성군 이채; 1411–1493)
  2. Yi Chin, Prince Seowon (서원군 이친; 1413–1475)
  3. Yi Hap, Prince Boseong (보성군 이합; 1416 – 1 September 1499)
  4. Yi Mil, Prince Nakan (낙안군 이밀; 1417–1474)
  5. Yi Jeong, Prince Yeongcheon (영천군 이정; 1422–?)
  6. Yi Ui, Prince Woncheon (원천군 이의; 1423–1476)
  7. Princess Yi of the Third Senior Rank (현주 이씨; 1426–?)
  8. Princess Biin of the Third Senior Rank (비인 현주; 12 June 1427 – 24 December 1514)
  9. Princess Yi of the Third Senior Rank (현주 이씨; 1431–?)
2. Lady Son of the Pyeonghae Son clan (평해 손씨; 1400–?)
  1. Princess Yi of the Third Senior Rank (현주 이씨; 1418–?)
  2. Yi Nang (이낭; 1430–?)
  3. Princess Yi of the Third Senior Rank (현주 이씨; 1437–?)
