= Yi Ku =

Korean prince (1931–2005)

- Yi and his then-wife, Julia Mullock, in 1963

Head of the House of Yi
- Period: May 1, 1970 – July 16, 2005
- Predecessor: Crown Prince Yi Un
- Successor: Yi Won or Yi Seok or Yi Hae-won (disputed)
- Born: December 29, 1931; Kitashirakawa Palace (now former Grand Prince Hotel Akasaka), Kioicho, Kojimachiku, Tokyo, Empire of Japan
- Died: July 16, 2005 (aged 73); Grand Prince Hotel Akasaka, Kioicho, Kojimachiku, Tokyo, Japan
- Spouse: Julia Mullock (m. 1959; div. 1982)
- Issue: Eugenia Unsuk (adopted)
- House: Yi
- Father: Crown Prince Yi Un of Korea
- Mother: Princess Masako of Nashimoto of Japan
- Religion: Roman Catholicism
- Occupation: Architect, businessperson

- Yi Ku
- Hangul: 이구
- Hanja: 李玖
- RR: I Gu
- MR: I Ku

Royal title
- Hangul: 황세손
- Hanja: 皇世孫
- Lit.: Prince Imperial
- RR: Hwangseson
- MR: Hwangseson

Posthumous name
- Hangul: 회은황세손
- Hanja: 懷隱皇世孫
- Lit.: Prince Imperial Hoeun
- RR: Hoeeun hwangseson
- MR: Hoeŭn hwangseson

Yi Ku (Korean: 이구; December 29, 1931 – July 16, 2005) was a Korean prince who was head of the House of Yi from 1970 until 2005. He was a grandson of Emperor Gojong of the Joseon dynasty. Through Kuni Asahiko his maternal great-grandfather, Ku was a second-cousin to Emperor Emeritus Akihito of Japan.

== Early life ==
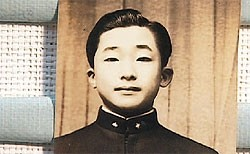
Yi (c. 1940s) in Japan

Ku was born in Kitashirakawa Palace (which is currently the Akasaka Prince Classic House, formerly part of the Akasaka Prince Hotel), Kioicho, Kojimachiku, Tokyo, Japan; his parents were Crown Prince Yi Un of Korea and Yi Bangja. Ku attended the Gakushuin Peers' School in Tokyo. He later attended Centre College, Danville, Kentucky and studied architecture at Massachusetts Institute of Technology both in the U.S.

== Adult life ==
He was employed as an architect with I.M. Pei & Assocs, Manhattan, New York from 1959 to 1964. Made stateless by Japan in 1947, Ku acquired United States citizenship in 1959 and South Korean citizenship in 1964. He married Julia Mullock (1927–2017) on 25 October 1959 at St George's Church in New York and they adopted a daughter, Eugenia Unsuk. He was a Freemason, having been initiated as a member in 1966.

After the fall of Syngman Rhee, he returned to Korea in 1963 with the help of the new president Park Chung Hee, moving into the New Building of Nakseonjae hall, Changdeokgung with his mother and wife. He lectured on architecture at Seoul National University and Yonsei University and also managed his own airline, Shinhan. When that went bankrupt in 1979, he went to Japan to earn money. In 1982, his family forced him to divorce his wife because she was sterile; his mother died in 1989. He started living with a Japanese astrologer, Kinuko Arita. In November 1996, he decided to reside permanently in Korea.

== Death ==
Yi went back and forth between Japan and Korea, and eventually died of a heart attack, at the age of 75, on July 16, 2005, at the Akasaka Prince Hotel, the former residence of his parents in Tokyo, Japan. His funeral was held on July 24, 2005, and his posthumous title decided as "Prince Imperial Hoeun" (Korean: 회은황세손; Hanja: 懷隱皇世孫) by the Jeonju Lee Royal Family Association. He is buried at the Hoeinwon Royal Tomb near his father and mother.

Yi Ku did not have an heir. According to the Jeonju Lee Royal Family Association, Yi Won, Yi Ku's first cousin once removed, was appointed as the heir by him. Yi Ku already considered adopting an heir for the imperial line of succession and Yi Won was considered; after meeting Yi Won several times, he was satisfied about the foreign language abilities of his cousin and allowed Won to be his successor. As of July 10, 2005, less than a week before his death, Yi Ku met the chairman of the association, Lee Hwan-ey (이환의; 李桓儀), for the last time, and Yi Ku formerly signed to adopt Yi Won as his heir. Despite that Yi Ku died soon afterwards, the Jeonju Lee Royal Family Association held a meeting for the adoption legitimacy in July 21, and in the next day, July 22, 2005, Yi Won was officially recognized by the association to be the successor of late Yi Ku.

Yi Ku House of Yi Born: 29 December 1931 Died: 16 July 2005
Royal titles
Vacant Title last held by Yi Un	Crown prince of King Yi; 29 December 1931 – 3 May 1947	Title abolished
Cultural offices
Vacant Title last held by Yi Un	Director of the Jeonju Lee Royal Family Association; 20 March 1973 – 16 July 2005	Vacant Title next held by Yi Won
Titles in pretence
Preceded by Crown Prince Uimin	— TITULAR — Emperor of Korea; 1 May 1970 – 16 July 2005; Reason for succession failure: Empire abolished in 1910	Succeeded by Yi Won
Preceded by Crown Prince Uimin	— TITULAR — Emperor of Korea; 1 May 1970 – 16 July 2005; Reason for succession failure: Empire abolished in 1910	Succeeded by Yi Seok
Preceded by Crown Prince Uimin	— TITULAR — Emperor of Korea; 1 May 1970 – 16 July 2005; Reason for succession failure: Empire abolished in 1910	Succeeded by Yi Hae-won
