= Kim Su-deok =

Princess Consort of Korea (1880–1964)

Kim Su-deok (Korean: 김수덕; Hanja: 金修德; 22 December 1880 – 14 January 1964), posthumously known as Lady Kim of Deokindang Hall (덕인당 김씨; 德仁堂 金氏), was the wife of Yi Kang, Imperial Prince Ui of Korea. After the Korean independence of 1945, she lived in her own palace in Seoul.

== Biography ==
=== Early life ===
Kim Su-deok was born into the Yonan Kim clan on 22 December 1880 in Goyang, Gyeonggi Province, during the Joseon dynasty of King Gojong's 16th year of reign. Her parents were Kim Sa-jun and Lady Hwang of the Changwon Hwang clan.

She lived in Yangju for a while before she and her family moved to Hanseong (modern-day Seoul) in 1881 where she spent most of her life before marriage. In 1886, she had changed her name from Kim Su-deok to Kim Suk (김숙; 金淑).

=== Marriage ===
After three rounds of selection by Queen Min, Kim Sa-jun's daughter was chosen to marry Yi Kang, at the time known as Prince Uihwa, the son of King Gojong and his concubine, Lady Jang of the Deoksu Jang clan, on 6 December 1893.

Prior to the marriage, her father had given to Queen Min a letter written by Queen Inmok which stated that women from her clan should never marry into the royal family due to the events of her marriage, but Queen Min was adamant in her decision as she liked Lady Kim's virtue.

After the couple married, Yi Kang had started to collect a lot of lawsuits, debt, and bribes so he could live in luxury. As she was the wife of a prince, her title was "Princess Consort Yeonwon". She and her husband never had children of their own as they didn't get along which led to Prince Uihwa to have 13 concubines, producing 12 step-sons and 9 step-daughters, during their marriage.

=== Korea's annexation ===
When Yi Kang was promoted to "Prince Imperial Ui" on 17 August 1900, she was given the royal title of "Consort Princess Imperial Ui". Sometime after Gojong's abdication from the throne, her title changed to "Duchess Consort of Yi Kang".

Kim Suk had witnessed the Japan-Korea Annexation Treaty on 22 August 1910, Korea's Independence on 15 August 1945, and the start of the Korean war on 25 June 1950.

After Korea's liberation on 15 August 1945, she lived at Byeol Palace in Jongno District, Seoul, and started to do calligraphy work.

=== Later life ===
On 9 August 1955, Lady Kim and her husband were baptized and converted from Buddhism to Roman Catholicism. They were given the names "Maria" and "Pius". Yi Kang died six days later on 15 August 1955 as the age of 78 in his mansion. She would outlive him by 8 years.

== Death ==
On 10 November 1963, Kim Suk started to have health complications as she struggled with her low blood pressure, and eventually died two months later, on 24 January 1964 at the age of 83 within Byeol Palace, Anguk-dong, Jongno District, Seoul, South Korea. She is buried with her husband in Hongneung.

== Family ==
- Father
  - Kim Sa-jun (김사준; 金思濬; 1855–1917)
- Mother
  - Lady Hwang of the Changwon Hwang clan (본관: 창원 황씨, 昌原 黄氏; 1855– ?)
- Husband
  - Yi Kang, Prince Uihwa (의친왕 이강; 義親王 李堈; 30 March 1877 – 15 August 1955) — No issue.

== Titles ==
- 22 December 1880 – 6 December 1893:

1. Kim Su-deok (김수덕; 金修德)

2. Kim Suk (김숙; 金淑)

3. Lady Kim (김씨; 金氏)

- 6 December 1893 – 17 August 1900: Her Highness, Princess Consort Yeonwon (연원군부인; 延原君夫人)
- 17 August 1900 – 20 July 1907: Her Imperial Highness, Consort Princess Imperial Ui (의친왕비; 義親王妃)
- 20 July 1910 – 29 August 1910: Her Highness, Duchess Consort of Yi Kang (이강공비; 李堈公妃)
- Posthumous title: Lady Kim of Deokindang Hall (덕인당 김씨; 德仁堂 金氏)

== In popular culture ==
- Portrayed by Kim Bok-hui in the 1981 MBC TV series The 1st Republic.
- Portrayed by Byeon So-jeong in the 1990 MBC TV series 500 Years of Joseon: Daewongun.
- Portrayed by Lee Ju-eun in the 2001–2002 KBS TV series Empress Myeongseong.
