= Queen Wongyeong =

Queen of Joseon from 1401 to 1418

Queen Dowager of Joseon
- Tenure: 18 September 1418 – 27 August 1420
- Predecessor: Queen Dowager Sundeok
- Successor: Queen Dowager Uideok

Queen Consort of Joseon
- Tenure: 7 December 1400 – 18 September 1418
- Predecessor: Queen Jeongan
- Successor: Queen Soheon

Crown Princess of Joseon
- Tenure: 8 March – 7 December 1400
- Predecessor: Crown Princess Kim
- Successor: Crown Princess Kim (Note: Wife of Grand Prince Yangnyeong.)
- Born: 6 August 1365; Songgyeong, Goryeo
- Died: 27 August 1420 (aged 55); Suganggung, Hanseong, Joseon
- Burial: Heolleung, Seoul, South Korea
- Spouse: King Taejong (m. 1382)
- Issue Detail: 8 sons, 4 daughters
Regnal name
- Hudeok (후덕; 厚德) (Note: Known as honorific name (존호; 尊號) in the Sinosphere, its closest equivalent in the English-speaking world is the regnal name.)
Posthumous name
- Queen Changdeok Soyeol Wongyeong (창덕소열원경왕후; 彰德昭烈元敬王后)
- Clan: Yeoheung Min (by birth); Jeonju Yi (by marriage)
- Dynasty: Yi
- Father: Min Je, Internal Prince Yeoheung
- Mother: Grand Princess Consort of Samhan State, of the Yeosan Song clan
- Religion: Buddhism

Korean name
- Hangul: 원경왕후
- Hanja: 元敬王后
- RR: Wongyeong wanghu
- MR: Wŏn'gyŏng wanghu

Queen Wongyeong (Korean: 원경왕후; Hanja: 元敬王后; 6 August 1365 – 27 August 1420) of the Yeoheung Min clan, was the wife of King Taejong, the third monarch of Joseon, and the mother of Sejong the Great. Known as Queen Jeong during her tenure, she was queen of Joseon from 1400 until her husband's abdication in 1418, and was then styled as Queen Dowager Hudeok during the reign of her son.

== Biography ==
=== Early life and lineage ===
The future Queen Wongyeong was born during the reign of King Gongmin of Goryeo, as the third daughter and child among four daughters and four sons. Her father was Min Je (민제) and her mother was a lady from the prestigious Yeosan Song clan.

Her natal Yeoheung Min clan was a representative aristocratic family of the time. They had entered the ranks of the ruling elite during the mid-Goryeo period and successfully established themselves at the very core of central aristocratic power by producing an overwhelming number of high-ranking bureaucrats. The family's immense political prestige grew even further during the Mongol rule and their position as one of the state's most preeminent lineages had been solidified by the late Goryeo period.

Via her great-grandfather, Min Jeok (민적), Lady Min was a first cousin once removed of Consort Hui and a second cousin of her son, King Chungjeong of Goryeo, as well as a second cousin once removed of Concubine Myeong (명빈 김씨; consort of her husband, King Taejong) and a second cousin twice removed of Deposed Crown Princess Kim. Furthermore, the three other Yeoheung Min queens/empresses — Queen Inhyeon, Empress Myeongseong and Empress Sunmyeonghyo — in addition to Princess Consort Yeoheung (여흥군부인; mother of Grand Internal Prince Heungseon) and Grand Internal Princess Consort Sunmok, all descended from Min Jeok via his second son, Min Yu (민유).

=== Marriage ===
In 1382, at the age of 17, she married 15-year-old Yi Bang-won, the fifth son of Goryeo general Yi Seong-gye (posthumously King Taejo of Joseon) and his first wife, Lady Han (posthumously Queen Sinui).

=== Involvement in politics ===
Lady Min has been described as an ambitious woman with an astute political drive, who frequently intervened in state affairs.

When Joseon was proclaimed and officially brought into existence, King Taejo raised the issue of which son would be his successor. Although Yi Bang-won had contributed most to his father's rise to power, he harbored a profound hatred against two of his father's key associates, Jeong Do-jeon and Nam Eun (남은). King Taejo's second wife, Queen Sindeok, then formed an alliance with Jeong Do-jeon and had her youngest son, Yi Bang-seok, appointed as crown prince.

In 1398, Jeong Do-jeon, who was enjoying great power at the time, promulgated a law requiring that all private soldiers and weapons be surrendered to the state. However, Lady Min managed to hide weapons and private soldiers belonging to her family; shortly after King Taejo fell ill, the Min clan took advantage of the opportunity to give the weaponry to their son-in-law. Yi Bang-won then rose up with his elder brothers, Yi Bang-ui (이방의) and Yi Bang-gan, and two of his brothers-in-law, Min Mu-gu (민무구) and Min Mu-jil (민무질), and immediately raided the palace, killing Jeong Do-jeon and his followers, as well as his two half-brothers, Yi Bang-beon (이방번) and Yi Bang-seok. This incident became known as the First Strife of the Princes.

Aghast at the fact that his sons were willing to kill each other for the throne and psychologically exhausted from the death of his second wife, King Taejo abdicated in favor of his eldest surviving son, Yi Bang-gwa (posthumously King Jeongjong).

In early 1400, the Second Strife of the Princes (제2차 왕자의 난) took place when Yi Bang-won and Yi Bang-gan vied for the position of successor to King Jeongjong. Yi Bang-gan was defeated and exiled. Subsequently, King Jeongjong appointed Yi Bang-won as crown prince, and Lady Min became crown princess. Later that year, King Jeongjong voluntarily abdicated in favor of Yi Bang-won (posthumously King Taejong), and Lady Min thus became queen.

=== Family downfall ===
In 1406, King Taejong brought up the topic of abdicating but later withdrew his statement. In the process, the elder two of Lady Min's brothers, Min Mu-gu and Min Mu-jil, voiced their gratification with the news; the two men were then exiled to Jeju Island, where they would be executed in 1410. Their father, Min Je, had a hard time coping with the exile of his sons and died in 1408.

Around this time, Lady Min's relationship with her husband had already worsened as Taejong began taking concubines from prominent families — his concubines had previously been mostly former maids of Lady Min, so her standing was not diminished by their existence. The situation was exacerbated when she didn't inform Taejong of the birth of their fourth daughter, Princess Jeongseon (정선공주), in 1404. It was said that her jealousy and the frequent marital disputes caused Taejong to avoid Lady Min's quarters. He once threatened to depose her, but this was probably either a maneuver to keep her in check, or a remark blurted out in a fit of rage, as the deposition would have been an unwise political move and out of character for King Taejong.

In 1416, Lady Min's remaining brothers, Min Mu-hyul (민무휼) and Min Mu-hoe (민무회), stated that the crown prince, Yi Je, would take great care of their family as they shared a close familial bond. When word reached Taejong, he saw it as a threat; the two brothers were exiled and then executed.

=== Later life and death ===
In 1418, King Taejong abdicated in favor of their third son, Yi Do (posthumously King Sejong), but continued to rule with an iron fist until his death. Lady Min became queen dowager, but died less than two years later, at the age of 55. She was buried within Heolleung (헌릉), today part of the Heonilleung burial ground in Seocho District, Seoul. King Taejong, who survived Lady Min by two years, was later buried alongside her.

== Titles ==
- During the reign of King Gongmin (r. 1351–1374):
  - Lady, of the Yeoheung Min clan (여흥 민씨; 驪興閔氏; from 6 August 1365)
    - Min Je's daughter (민제의 딸)
    - Lady Min (민씨; 閔氏)
- During the reign of King Taejo (r. 1392–1398):
  - Mistress Jeongnyeong (정녕옹주; 靖寧翁主; from 1392)
- During the reign of King Jeongjong (r. 1398–1400):
  - Crown Princess Jeong (정빈; 貞嬪; from 8 March 1400)
- During the reign of King Taejong (r. 1400–1418):
  - Queen Jeong (Note: While the pronunciation is the same, the jeong character used as Lady Min's honorific title during her tenure as crown princess is different from the one used after she became queen: 貞 (lit. ''loyal'') and 靜 (lit. ''serene'').) (정비; 靜妃; from 7 December 1400)
- During the reign of King Sejong (r. 1418–1450):
  - Queen Dowager Hudeok (후덕왕대비; 厚德王大妃; from 18 September 1418)
  - Queen Dowager Wongyeong (원경왕태후; 元敬王太后; from 1420)
- During the reign of King Sukjong (r. 1674–1720):
  - Queen Wongyeong (원경왕후; 元敬王后; from 1683)

== Family ==
- Father: Min Je (민제), Internal Prince Yeoheung (여흥부원군; 1339 – 13 October 1408)
- Mother: Grand Princess Consort of Samhan State (삼한국대부인), of the Yeosan Song clan (여산 송씨; 1342–1414)
- Sibling(s)
  - Lady, of the Yeoheung Min clan (여흥 민씨; 1355–?) (Note: Married Jo Bak (조박), Prince Pyeongwon (평원군; 1356–1408) from the Pyongyang Jo clan. They had issue (1 son, 1 daughter).)
  - Grand Princess Consort of Samhan State (삼한국대부인), of the Yeoheung Min clan (여흥 민씨; 1357–?) (Note: Married Yi Cheon-u (이천우), Prince Wansan (완산군; 1354–1417); second son of Grand Prince Wanpung. They had issue (3 sons).)
  - Min Mu-gu (민무구), Prince Yeogang (여강군; 1369 – 29 April 1410) (Note: ▪︎Wife: Lady, of the Andong Gwon clan (안동 권씨); daughter of Gwon Hyeon (권현). ▪︎Issue: 1 son.)
  - Min Mu-jil (민무질), Prince Yeoseong (여성군; 1372 – 29 April 1410) (Note: ▪︎Wife: Lady, of the Cheongju Han clan (청주 한씨); daughter of Han Sang-hwan (한상환), first cousin once removed of Han Myeong-hoe and second cousin of Queen Jeonghui. ▪︎Issue: 3 sons, 3 daughters.)
  - Min Mu-hyul (민무휼), Prince Yeowon (여원군; 1373 – 13 January 1416) (Note: ▪︎Wife: Lady, of the Seongju Yi clan (성주 이씨); second daughter of Yi Jik (이직), Internal Prince Seongsan (성산부원군; 1362–1431) and younger sister of Mistress Sinsungung (신순궁주; consort of King Taejong). ▪︎Issue: 4 daughters.)
  - Min Mu-hoe (민무회), Prince Yeosan (여산군; 1375 – 13 January 1416) (Note: ▪︎1st wife: Lady, of the Andong Gwon clan (안동 권씨); daughter of Gwon Jip-ji (권집지) and first cousin of Consort Gongxianxian. ▪︎2nd wife: Lady, of the (old) Andong Kim clan (구 안동 김씨); daughter of Kim Ik-dal (김익달). ▪︎Issue: 1 son, 1 daughter.)
  - Lady, of the Yeoheung Min clan (여흥 민씨) (Note: Married Right State Councilor No Han (노한; 1376–1443) from the Gyoha No clan (교하 노씨); nephew of Consort Sun. They had issue (1 son, 2 daughters); among their descendants is the 6th president of South Korea, Roh Tae-woo.)
- Husband: King Taejong (태종대왕; 21 June 1367 – 8 June 1422)
  - Father-in-law: King Taejo (태조대왕; 4 November 1335 – 27 June 1408)
  - Mother-in-law: Queen Sinui (신의왕후), of the Cheongju Han clan (청주 한씨; 6 October 1337 – 25 November 1391)
  - Stepmother-in-law: Queen Sindeok (신덕왕후), of the Goksan Kang clan (곡산 강씨; 20 July 1356 – 23 September 1396)
- Issue
  - Princess Jeongsun (정순공주; 1385 – 18 September 1460)
  - Princess Gyeongjeong (경정공주; 1387 – 29 June 1455) (Note: Married Jo Dae-rim (조대림), Internal Prince Pyongyang (평양부원군; 1387–1430) from the Pyongyang Jo clan (평양 조씨); eldest son of Chief State Councilor Jo Jun (조준; 1346–1405). They had issue (1 son, 4 daughters); among their descendants is Queen Inmok.)
  - Unnamed son (1389)
  - Unnamed son (1390)
  - Unnamed son (1392)
  - Princess Gyeongan (경안공주; 1393 – 8 June 1415) (Note: Married Gwon Gyu (권규), Prince Gilchang (길창군; 1393–1421) from the Andong Gwon clan (안동 권씨); third son of Gwon Geun (권근; 1352–1409) and uncle of Gwon Ram. They had issue (2 sons, 1 daughter).)
  - Yi Je (이제), Grand Prince Yangnyeong (양녕대군; 1394 – 8 October 1462)
  - Yi Bo (이보), Grand Prince Hyoryeong (효령대군; 29 January 1396 – 22 June 1486)
  - Yi Fo (이도), King Sejong (세종대왕; 15 May 1397 – 8 April 1450)
  - Princess Jeongseon (정선공주; 1404 – 5 March 1424) (Note: Married Nam Hwi (남휘), Prince Uisan (의산군; ?–1454) from the Uiryeong Nam clan (의령 남씨); grandson of Chief State Councilor Nam Jae (남재; 1351–1419) and grandnephew of Nam Eun (남은; 1354–1398). They had issue (1 son, 1 daughter).)
  - Yi Jong (이종), Grand Prince Seongnyeong (성녕대군; 12 August 1405 – 20 March 1418) (Note: ▪︎Wife: Grand Princess Consort of Samhan State (삼한국대부인), of the Changnyeong Seong clan (창녕 성씨); daughter of Seong Eok (성억). ▪︎Issue: 2 adopted sons.)
  - Unnamed son (1412)

== Ancestry ==
Ancestors of Queen Wongyeong

Min Jong-yu (민종유)
Min Jeok (민적)
Lady, of the Yu clan (유씨)
Min Byeon (민변)
Won Gwan (원관)
Lady, of the Wonju Won clan (원주 원씨)
Min Je, Internal Prince Yeoheung (여흥부원군 민제)
Heo Baek (허백)
Lady, of the Yangcheon Heo clan (양천 허씨)
Queen Wongyeong
Song Seon (송선)
Grand Princess Consort of Samhan State, of the Yeosan Song clan (삼한국대부인 여산 송씨)
Lady, of the Dalseong Ha clan (달성 하씨)

== In popular culture ==
- Portrayed by Kim Yong-rim in the 1973 KBS TV series Great King Sejong.
- Portrayed by Park Won-sook in the 1976 KBS TV series Prime Minister Hwang Hui.
- Portrayed by Kim Young-ran in the 1983 MBC TV series 500 Years of Joseon: The King of Chudong Palace.
- Portrayed by Choi Myung-gil in the 1996–1998 KBS1 TV series Tears of the Dragon.
- Portrayed by Choi Myung-gil in the 2008 KBS TV series The Great King, Sejong.
- Portrayed by Kang Se-jung in the 2014 KBS1 TV series Jeon Do-jeon.
- Portrayed by Kim Sa-hee in the 2015 film Empire of Lust.
- Portrayed by Im Ye-jin in the 2015 MBC TV series Splash Splash Love.
- Portrayed by Gong Seung-yeon in the 2015–2016 SBS TV series Six Flying Dragons.
- Portrayed by Seo Young-hee in the 2021 SBS TV series Joseon Exorcist.
- Portrayed by Park Jin-hee in the 2021–2022 KBS1 TV series The King of Tears, Lee Bang-won.
- Portrayed by Cha Joo-young in the 2025 tvN series The Queen Who Crowns.

== See also ==
- History of Korea
- Consort kin
- Politics of Joseon
- Styles and titles in Joseon

== Notes ==
Queen Wongyeong Yeoheung Min clan
Royal titles
Preceded by Queen Jeongan of the Gyeongju Kim clan	Queen Consort of Joseon; 1400–1418	Succeeded by Queen Soheon of the Cheongseong Shim clan
Preceded by Queen Dowager Sundeok of the Gyeongju Kim clan	Queen Dowager of Joseon; 1418–1420	Succeeded by Queen Dowager Uideok of the Yeosan Song clan
