= Queen Jeongan =

Queen of Joseon from 1398 to 1400

Queen Dowager of Joseon
- Tenure: 7 December 1400 – 11 August 1412
- Predecessor: None
- Successor: Queen Dowager Hudeok

Queen Consort of Joseon
- Tenure: 22 October 1398 – 7 December 1400
- Predecessor: Queen Sindeok
- Successor: Queen Wongyeong

Crown Princess of Joseon
- Tenure: 14 – 22 October 1398
- Predecessor: Crown Princess Shim (Note: Second wife of Grand Prince Uian.)
- Successor: Crown Princess Min
- Born: 30 January 1355; Goryeo
- Died: 11 August 1412 (aged 57); Indeokgung, Hanseong, Joseon
- Burial: Hurung, Kaesong, North Korea
- Spouse: King Jeongjong
Regnal name
- Sundeok (순덕; 順德) (Note: Known as honorific name (존호; 尊號) in the Sinosphere, its closest equivalent in the English-speaking world is the regnal name.)
Posthumous name
- Queen Onmyeong Jangui Jeongan (온명장의정안왕후; 溫明莊懿定安王后)
- Clan: Gyeongju Kim (by birth); Jeonju Yi (by marriage)
- Dynasty: Yi
- Father: Kim Cheon-seo, Internal Prince Wolseong
- Mother: Grand Princess Consort of Samhan State, of the Damyang Yi clan
- Religion: Buddhism

Korean name
- Hangul: 정안왕후
- Hanja: 定安王后
- RR: Jeongan wanghu
- MR: Chŏngan wanghu

Queen Jeongan (Korean: 정안왕후; Hanja: 定安王后; 30 January 1355 – 11 August 1412), (Note: In the Korean calendar (lunisolar), she was born on the 9th day of the 1st lunar month and died on the 25th day of the 6th lunar month.) of the Gyeongju Kim clan, was the wife of King Jeongjong, the second monarh of Joseon. Known as Queen Deok during her tenure, she was queen of Joseon from 1398 until her husband's abdication in 1400, and was then styled as Queen Dowager Sundeok during the reign of her brother-in-law, King Taejong.

== Biography ==
=== Early life and lineage ===
The future Queen Jeongan was born during the reign of King Gongmin of Goyreo, as the eldest daughter and third child among three sons and four daughters. Her father was Kim Cheon-seo (김천서) and her mother was a lady from the Damyang Yi clan (담양 이씨).

Lady Kim came from the Gyeongju Kim clan, the final and most prolific of Silla's three ruling families. She was a descendant of King Gyeongsun (the last monarch of Silla) and Princess Nakrang (eldest daughter of King Taejo, the founder of Goryeo) via their second son, Kim Eun-yeol (김은열). Queen Jeongsun was distantly related to her as they both traced their ancestry to Kim Jeong-gu (김정구), a grandson of Kim Eun-yeol.

=== Marriage and royal life ===
It is unknown when Lady Kim married Yi Bang-gwa, the second son of Goryeo general Yi Seong-gye (posthumously King Taejo of Joseon) and his first wife, Lady Han (posthumously Queen Sinui). The marriage produced no children.

Her father-in-law established Joseon in 1392. Six years later, in 1398, Yi Panggwa was appointed as crown prince following the First Strife of the Princes. Consequently, she became crown princess and received the honorific title tŏk (덕; lit. ''virtuous''). Yi Bang-gwa (posthumously King Jeongjong) acceded to the throne shortly after and Lady Kim thus became queen.

In the aftermath of the Second Strife of the Princes (제2차 왕자의 난), when King Jeongjong abdicated in favor of his younger brother, Yi Bang-won (posthumously King Taejong), she was elevated to the position of queen dowager.

=== Death ===
Lady Kim died 12 years later, at the age of 57. She was buried within Hurung (후릉) in present-day Kaesong, North Korea. King Jeongjong, who survived Lady Kim by seven years, was later buried alongside her.

She was conferred the posthumous name Jeongan (정안; lit. ''stable and peaceful''), which has also been rendered as Anjeong (안정).

== Titles ==
- During the reign of King Gongmin (r. 1351–1374):
  - Lady, of the Gyeongju Kim clan (경주 김씨; 慶州金氏; from 30 January 1355)
    - Kim Cheon-seo's daughter (김천서의 딸)
    - Lady Kim (김씨; 金氏)
- During the reign of King Taejo (r. 1392–1398):
  - Crown Princess Deok (덕빈; 德嬪; from 14 October 1398)
- During the reign of King Jeongjong (r. 1398–1400):
  - Queen Deok (덕비; 德妃; from 22 October 1398)
- During the reign of King Taejong (r. 1400–1418):
  - Queen Dowager Sundeok (순덕왕대비; 順德王大妃; from 7 December 1400)
  - Queen Jeongan (정안왕후; 定安王后; from 1412)

== Family ==
- Father: Kim Cheon-seo (김천서), Internal Prince Wolseong (월성부원군)
- Mother: Grand Princess Consort of Samhan State (삼한국대부인), of the Damyang Yi clan (담양 이씨)
- Sibling(s)
  - Kim Seok-jun (김석준) (Note: High-ranking Buddhist monk.)
  - Kim Su (김수), Prince Wolseong (월성군; 1338–1409)
  - Lady, of the Gyeongju Kim clan (경주 김씨) (Note: Abbess of Jeongeopwon (정업원), a Buddhist temple where women from powerful families became nuns during the Goryeo and early Joseon periods; it was located in present-day Seoul.)
  - Kim Sam-won (김삼원)
  - Lady, of the Gyeongju Kim clan (경주 김씨) (Note: Married No Yeong-guk (노영국) from the Gwangju No clan (광주 노씨).)
  - Lady, of the Gyeongju Kim clan (경주 김씨) (Note: Married Yun Yu-rin (윤유린), Prince Pyeongyang (평양군; ?–1390) from the Papyeong Yun clan (파평 윤씨).)
- Husband: King Jeongjong (정종대왕; 26 July 1357 – 24 October 1419) — No issue.
  - Father-in-law: King Taejo (태조대왕; 4 November 1335 – 27 June 1408)
  - Mother-in-law: Queen Sinui (신의왕후), of the Cheongju Han clan (청주 한씨; 6 October 1337 – 25 November 1391)
  - Stepmother-in-law: Queen Sindeok (신덕왕후), of the Goksan Kang clan (곡산 강씨; 20 July 1356 – 23 September 1396)

== Ancestry ==
Ancestors of Queen Jeongan

Kim Il (김일)
Kim Gyeon (김견)
Kim Mun-jung (김문중)
Kim Cheon-seo, Internal Prince Wolseong (월성부원군 김천서)
Lady, of the Yun clan (윤씨)
Queen Jeongan
Yi Ye (이예)
Grand Princess Consort of Samhan State, of the Damyang Yi clan (삼한국대부인 담양 이씨)
Yu In-su (유인수)
Lady, of the Munhwa Yu clan (문화 유씨)

== In popular culture ==
- Portrayed by Kim Hae-sook in the 1983 MBC TV series 500 Years of Joseon: The King of Chudong Palace.
- Portrayed by Park Yoon-sun in the 1996–1998 KBS1 TV series Tears of the Dragon.
- Portrayed by Kim Seo-yeon in the 2021–2022 KBS1 TV series The King of Tears, Lee Bang-won.

== See also ==
- Styles and titles in Joseon
- History of Korea

== Notes ==
Queen Jeongan Gyeongju Kim clan
Royal titles
Preceded by Queen Sindeok of the Goksan Kang clan	Queen Consort of Joseon; 1398–1400	Succeeded by Queen Wongyeong of the Yeoheung Min clan
New title	Queen Dowager of Joseon; 1400–1412	Succeeded by Queen Dowager Hudeok of the Yeoheung Min clan
