= Hurung =

15th-century mausoleum in North Korea

Coordinates: 37°50′1″N 126°32′3″E

- Hangul: 후릉
- Hanja: 厚陵
- RR: Hureung
- MR: Hurŭng

Hurŭng (Korean: 후릉), also known as Huneung, is a 15th-century royal mausoleum located in Ryongjong Village, Panmun-guyok, Kaesong, North Korea. The site consists of two separate burial mounds, which contain the remains of Jeongjong, the second king of the Joseon dynasty and son of its founder Taejo, as well as the body of his wife, Queen Jeongan. Construction on the tombs began after Queen Jeongan's death in 1412, and was only completed after Jeongjong himself died in 1419. Both tombs consist of a burial mound ringed with a carved granite base; they are surrounded by statues of the twelve zodiac animals. The "spirit road" up to the tombs is lined with statues of military officers and Confucian officials.

Despite being the tomb of a Joseon monarch, the site was excluded from the World Heritage Site "Royal Tombs of the Joseon Dynasty" as it is located in North Korea. It is one of two royal tombs from that dynasty in the country; the other, Cherung, belongs to Queen Sinui, wife of the dynasty's founder Taejo, who died before her husband became king and moved the capital to Hanseong (present-day Seoul).
