= Cherung =

Mausoleum near Kaesong, North Korea

Coordinates: 37°53′46″N 126°33′24″E

- Korean name
- Hangul: 제릉
- Hanja: 齊陵
- RR: Jereung
- MR: Cherŭng

The Cherŭng Royal Tomb, also known as Jeneung Royal Tomb, is a 15th-century mausoleum located in Chi-dong, Panmun-guyok Kaesong, North Korea. The site contains the body of Queen Sinui, first wife of Yi Song-gye, the founder of the Joseon dynasty. Construction on the tomb began after her death in 1392; as she died before her husband overthrew the Goryeo dynasty to become king, she was buried in the Goryeo-era capital of Gaegyeong (present-day Kaesong). After Yi took the throne, she was posthumously awarded the title of "queen". The burial mound is ringed with a carved granite base, while the "spirit road" leading to the tomb is lined with statues of military officers and Confucian officials.

Despite being the tomb of a Joseon monarch, the site was excluded from the World Heritage Site "Royal Tombs of the Joseon Dynasty" as it is located in North Korea. It is one of two royal tombs from that dynasty in the country; the other, Hurung, belongs to King Jeongjong, who temporarily moved the capital back to Gaegyeong before abdicating.
