= Umbilical cord tomb of Taejo of Joseon =

- 태조대왕 태실 (Korean)
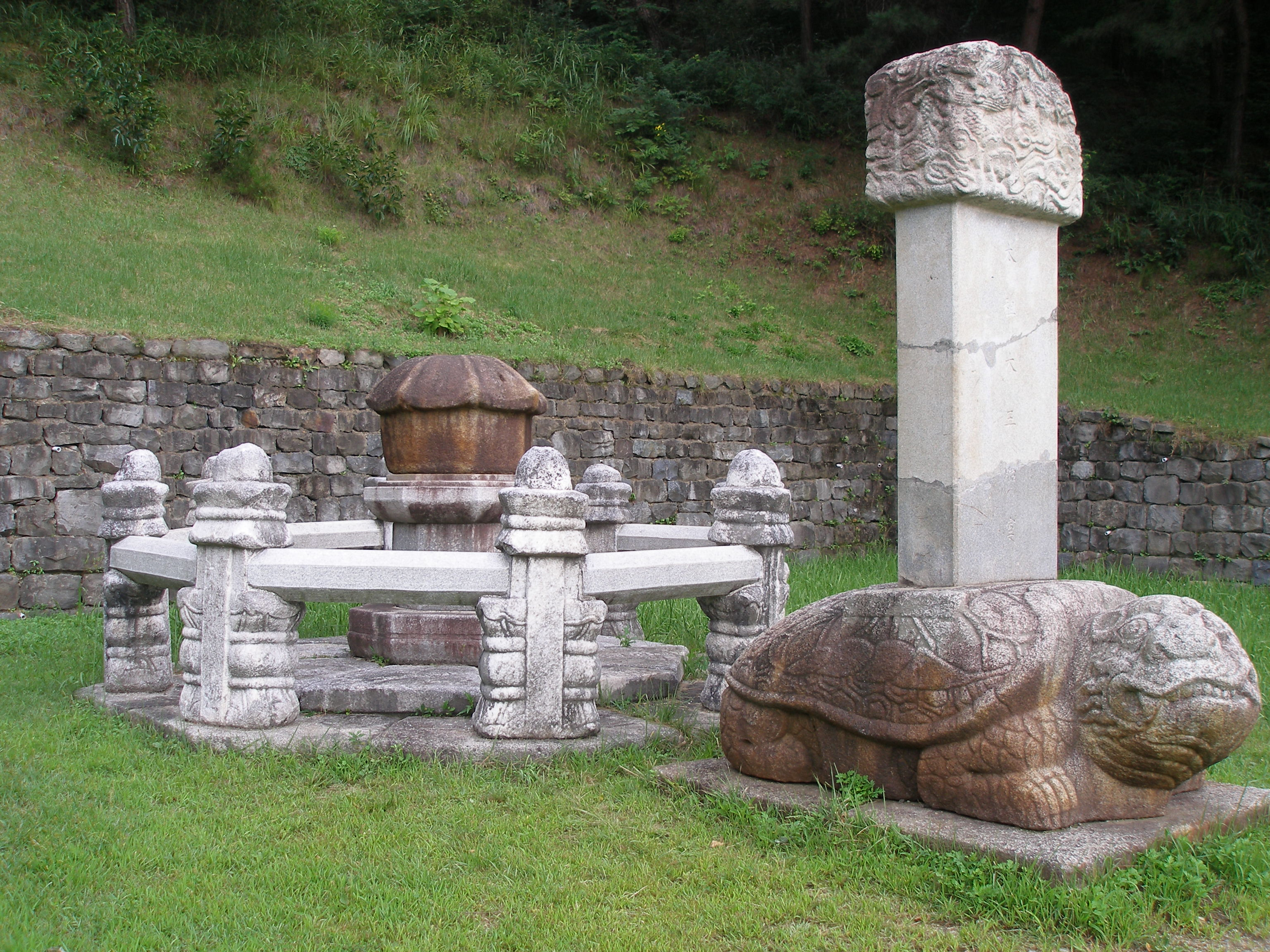

- Location within South Korea
- 36°11′52.3″N 127°28′27.6″E
- Region: Geumsan County

The Umbilical cord tomb of Taejo of Joseon (Korean: 태조대왕태실; Hanja: 太祖大王胎室) is a tomb in Geumsan, South Korea, where the umbilical cords of Taejo of Joseon and his son Jeongjong are buried. It was originally located in Ryongyon County, and was moved to its current location in 1393.
