= First Strife of the Princes =

1398 successful coup in Joseon

Date	26–27th day of the 8th month of 1398 (October 1398)
Location	Hansŏng, Joseon
Result	Rebellion successful: Yi Pangsŏk is put into exile and subsequently assassinated; Taejo abdicates the throne

Parties
Yi Pangsŏk and supporting faction	Yi Pangwŏn and supporting faction

Commanders and leaders
Yi Pangsŏk X; Chŏng Tojŏn †; Nam Ŭn (executed); Sim Hyosaeng †	Yi Pangwŏn; Ha Ryun; Yi Sukpŏn

Casualties and losses
Unknown; most leading figures killed	Unknown; likely low

The First Strife of the Princes (Korean: 제1차 왕자의 난; Hanja: 第一次 王子之亂), also known as the Muin Coup (Note: Muin refers to the Korean year name of 1398 on the sexagenary cycle) (무인정사; 戊寅定社), was a coup of the early Joseon dynasty led by Yi Pangwŏn, Prince Chŏngan and his supporters against heir apparent Yi Pangsŏk, Grand Prince Ŭian regarding the succession of Taejo of Joseon. The conflict led to the disposition and eventual assassination of Yi Pangsŏk and the death of many of his supporters, most notably Chŏng Tojŏn. Following the incident, Taejo abdicated the throne, leading to the ascension of his eldest surviving son, Yi Panggwa, as Jeongjong.

The rebellion stemmed from a conflict between Yi Pangwŏn and Chŏng Tojŏn, who struggled over major political issues, such as the selection of an heir, the abolition of private militias, and the planning of an invasion of Liaodong against Ming China.

== Background ==
=== Conflicts over secession ===
In 1392, Yi Sŏnggye founded Joseon shortly after his coup against King U of Goryeo in 1388, abolishing the Goryeo dynasty and becoming the first monarch of the newfound kingdom. Taejo held two principal consorts throughout his life: Lady Han of the Cheongju Han clan, with whom he had six sons—Yi Pangu, Yi Panggwa, Yi Pangŭi, Yi Panggan, Yi Pangwŏn, and Yi Pangyŏn—and Lady Kang of the Koksang Kang clan, with whom he had two sons—Yi Pangbŏn and Yi Pangsŏk. Lady Han, whom Taejo had been engaged to throughout his service as a general of Goryeo, had passed in 1391, before the founding of Joseon. Upon his enthronement, Taejo married Kang, who was immediately honored as Queen Hyŏn (현비; 顯妃) in 1392. While Lady Han received a posthumous title as Queen Chŏl (절비; 節妃), she was nonetheless enranked as a concubine, hierarchically below the queen consort.

Adhering to Queen Hyŏn's preferences, Taejo nominated her second and youngest son, Pangsŏk, as crown prince. (Note: Taejo initially proposed Queen Hyŏn's eldest son, Yi Pangbŏn. He later withdrew his choice following fierce opposition from his courtiers, as Yi Pangbŏn's spouse was the niece of Gongyang of Goryeo—the last monarch of Goryeo whom Taejo had previously deposed.) This decision brought opposition from many of Pangsŏk's half-brothers, and especially Yi Pangwŏn, who strongly insisted that the selection consider the contributions of each prince to the founding of Joseon. Yi Pangwŏn had previously played major roles in most of Taejo's undertakings against the Goryeo monarchy. Most notably, he had assassinated Chŏng Mong-ju, a moderate reformist and prominent political foe who opposed the founding of a new dynasty, in 1392. Nevertheless, Yi Pangwŏn, along with many other princes born of Lady Han, was largely excluded from the center of politics as the early years of Taejo's reign progressed. For instance, unlike others who had closely partaken in the establishment of Joseon, Yi Pangwŏn was not titled a Meritorious Subject of Dynastic Foundation in 1392.

Several of Taejo's chief ministers, including Chŏng Tojŏn, Nam Ŭn, and Sim Hyosaeng, patronized and advocated for the young crown prince. Chŏng insisted that, under strict application of Confucian principles, the heir be either an eldest son or a sage who could reign with wisdom, and dissented from Yi Pangwŏn's emphasis on meritious deeds. In response, Yi Pangwŏn accused the ministers of consolidating their powers by rallying behind the favored crown prince.

=== Chŏng Tojŏn and an invasion of Liaodong ===
Ming–Joseon relationships during the early years of Taejo's reign were capricious. Taejo's pledged allegiance to the Ming emperor was well-received; however, the Ming maintained a dubious position over Korea, wary of a potential threat of a Korean–Jurchen alliance to the Liaodong Peninsula. In July 1396, (Note: 11th day, 6th month, 5th year of Taejo (1396) on the lunisolar calendar) the Ming Emperor Taizu dispatched emissaries to Joseon, who demanded that Chŏng Tojŏn be summoned to China under accusations of inserting derogatory remarks on a diplomatic memorial (표문; 表文) he had previously co-authored. Taejo sent several diplomats, including Ha Ryun, Yang Chŏnsik, and Sŏl Changsu, to Nanjing for negotiations, but to no avail.

The Joseon court fractured over the crisis, with chief courtiers arguing for and against Chŏng's summoning. As Taejo's most trusted advisor and policymaker, Chŏng Tojŏn held immense influence over Joseon's early domestic policies, with the likelihood of a profound political shift if he were to be detained indefinitely or executed in China. While the specific circumstances leading up to the proposal are unclear, suggestions of a preemptive invasion of Liaodong, upheld by Chŏng and his supporters, were under discussion by mid-1397. While the plan was ultimately made null, the controversy surrounding it further polarized the court.

=== Consolidation of private armies ===
By the late Goryeo dynasty, military affairs were largely decentralized and allocated under the authority of regional governors, who commanded highly independent provincial armies. This system continued into the early years of the Joseon dynasty, with various princes holding gubernatorial positions and independent authority over regional forces. A portion of these forces, known as the siwip'ae (시위패; 侍衛牌), were called into Hansŏng to constitute a central defense force for the newfound dynasty, but were nonetheless placed under the control of individual governors.

In late 1393, Taejo created the Three Armies Headquarters, and from 1394, ordered the siwip'ae to engage in joint military training with the rest of his forces. A large number of Taejo's courtiers petitioned for the complete consolidation of the siwip'ae. Taejo initially refused these requests, but following a major illness in 1398, the prospect of a stable succession became an immediate concern. In April 1398, (Note: 20th day, 3rd month of the 7th year of Taejo's reign (1398)) Taejo approved Nam Ŭn's proposal to incorporate gubernatorial forces into an unified royal force, and in fall (Note: Some point between the 10th to 15th day of the 8th month of his 7th year (1398)) of the same year ordered the dissolution of all private armies of governors with the exception of Yi Pangbŏn.

== Coup ==
With his private army now facing dissolution, Yi Pangwŏn became increasingly apprehensive of a political purge following the ascension of his half-brother. During this period, he worked closely with Ha Ryun, then the civil governor of Chungcheong Province. According to his obituary in the Veritable Records of Taejong, Ha was the first to suggest a preemptive strike on Chŏng and his forces to Yi Pangwŏn.

The Veritable Records of Taejo narrates the events of the coup as follows. On the night of the 26th day of the 8th month (early October) of 1398, the princes were called into the Gyeongbokgung in news of Taejo's declining health. According to the Veritable Records, Yi Pangwŏn was made aware in advance, through Yi Hwa and Yi Mu, that the summoning was part of a plot by Chŏng and several other ministers to gather the princes in one place, before slaughtering them all. Stating his bowel pain, Yi Pangwŏn exited the palace and remained in a latrine before uniting with princes Yi Panggui and Yi Panggan. When he arrived at his residence, Yi Pangwŏn summoned Yi Sukpŏn, the military administrator of Ansan County, who arrived with several other generals, all of whom were discontent with their current position in government and were in his support. According to the Veritable Records, only 10 cavalry, 9 foot soldiers, and 10 armed servants were present with Yi Pangwon's forces at this time.

Around 9 to 11 PM (igyŏng; 이경; 二更), Yi Pangwŏn and Yi Sukpŏn rode on horseback to Nam Ŭn's residence in Songhyŏn, where the ministers were allegedly devising their plot. There, they discovered Chŏng and Nam "laughing" and having a discussion inside a house belonging to Nam's concubine, while the rest of their servants were asleep. Yi Sukpŏn ordered his forces to surround the residence and set fire to three nearby houses, killing Sim Hyosaeng and several other ministers in the frenzy. Chŏng escaped and sought refuge inside a neighboring house, but was found and brought to face Yi Pangwŏn. The Veritable Records cite that Chŏng begged for his life, requesting that Yi would "save his life as he did in the past" (昔者公旣活我, 願今亦活之), (Note: In reference to Yi's assassination of Chŏng Mong-ju in 1392, who was a major political opponent of Chŏng Tojŏn) but was met with a scolding Yi, who subsequently beheaded him. Three of Chŏng's four sons were killed following his death. Chŏng Yu (정유; 鄭游) and Chŏng Yŏng (정영; 鄭泳) rushed to their father's aid, only to be killed by Yi's forces. Another son, Chŏng Tam (정담; 鄭湛), took his own life in his residence.

Following the incident at Songhyŏn, Yi Pangwŏn summoned left councillor Cho Chun and right councillor (Note: The left (chwajŏngsŭng; 좌정승; 左政丞) and right councillors (ujŏngsŭng; 우정승; 右政丞) were the two chief ministers of the Secretariat-Chancellery of Goryeo and early Joseon.) Kim Sahyŏng to a bridge in Gahoe-bang, where they were isolated from their personal guards. When confronted with the alleged conspiracy, Cho claimed that they had not been aware of the scheme. Cho, who had previously sided with Chŏng regarding the selection of Yi Pangsŏk as crown prince but had since dissented from him over the planned invasion of Liaodong, agreed to assist the uprising. With the assistance of the councillors, Yi gathered all of the officials (백관; 百官) of the palace, and ordered General Commander of the King's Personal Guard (친군위 도진무; 親軍衛都鎭撫) Cho On (조온; 趙溫) to disarm and relieve all armed bodyguards (갑사; 甲士) positioned south of the Geunjeongjeon, effectively neutralizing all forces within the Gyeongbokgung.

On the morning of the 27th, Taejo was informed of the alleged plot and the subsequent death of the ministers. Yi Panggwa, the eldest living prince born of Lady Han, was called into the palace from his hiding place in Pungyang, where he had taken refuge upon hearing news of the coup. Yi Pangwon publicly endorsed Yi Panggwa on the basis of his elderly status, and petitioned Taejo for his appointment as crown prince. Taejo accepted the petition, issuing a royal edict denouncing Chŏng Tojŏn and his accused accomplices, and announcing the installation of Yi Panggwa as crown prince along with the exile of Yi Pangsŏk.

== Aftermath ==
Yi Pangsŏk was assassinated shortly after he departed from the palace, before he could arrive at his place of exile. Yi Pangbŏn, his younger brother, was sent into exile to Tongjin, but was assassinated en route in the office of the ferry-station official (도승관; 渡丞館) in Yanghwado. (Note: A major ferry station that was located within what is now Hapjeong-dong in the Mapo District of Seoul, near the modern location of Yanghwa Bridge.) According to the Veritable Records, Nam Ŭn escaped the initial attack in Songhyŏn and went into hiding. Believing that he would be spared, Nam voluntarily appeared and surrendered himself at the Sun'gunmanhobu, but was executed.

Less than a month after the coup, Taejo abdicated the throne on the 5th day of the 9th month, leading to Yi Panggwa's coronation. The following day, Jeongjong titled Yi Pangwŏn and 28 other figures as Meritorious Subjects of Dynastic Foundation. In the 11th month of 1398, he enshrined his mother, Lady Han, as Queen Sinui.

A subsequent conflict arose between Yi Panggan and Yi Pangwŏn regarding the selection of Jeongjong's heir, leading to the Second Strife of Princes in 1400.

== Modern Interpretation ==
Modern scholarship has largely challenged the narrative of the coup as described in the Veritable Records of Taejo, which was compiled during the reign of Taejong, with Ha Ryun as a major contributor. There is a debate over whether the alleged plot to murder Yi Pangwŏn and other princes born of Lady Han actually existed.

The Sambong chip, a collection of works by Chŏng Tojŏn, includes a poem which is alleged to have been devised by him just before his beheading by Yi.

== Bibliography ==
- Han, Choonsoon [한춘순] (2010). "太祖 7年(1398) '제1차 왕자 난'의 재검토" [Review of 'the 1st prince's rebellion' in 7 Years(1398) King Taegjo]. 조선시대사학보 (in Korean). 55. 조선시대사학회: 5–39 – via KCI.
- Kim, Jinwung (2012). History of Korea : From Land of the Morning Calm to States in Conflict. Bloomington, Indiana: Indiana University Press. ISBN 978-0-253-00024-8.
- Park, Hong-kyu (2006). "King Taejong as a Statesman: From Power to Authority". Korea Journal. 46 (4). Academy of Korean Studies: 192–221. ISSN 0023-3900.
