= Um Hyo-sup =

South Korean actor (born 1966)

- Born: October 24, 1966 (age 59); Incheon, South Korea
- Occupation: Actor
- Agent: Star Village Entertainment

Korean name
- Hangul: 엄효섭
- Hanja: 嚴孝燮
- RR: Eom Hyoseop
- MR: Ŏm Hyosŏp

Um Hyo-sup (born October 24, 1966) is a South Korean actor. Um mostly plays supporting roles in films and television dramas.

== Filmography ==
=== Film ===
Year	Title	Role
1995	Who Drives Me Crazy	
1999	Beyond Millenium (short film)	
2001	Yellow Hair 2	
2001	One Fine Spring Day	
2002	Break Out	Crewman 1
2003	Double Agent	
2003	Star	
2003	Come Close To Me (short film)	
2004	Springtime	
2005	Possible Changes	
2006	The Romance	
2007	May 18	Captain Kim
2009	Marine Boy	Section chief Jo
2009	Private Eye	Official Murata
2011	The Crucible	Police officer Jang
2012	Gabi	Tanya's father
2012	R2B: Return to Base	Republic of Korea Air Force commander (cameo)
2014	The Youth aka The Rumor	Manager Ji (cameo)
2015	Gangnam Blues	Kim Jung-kyu
2015	Shoot Me in the Heart	Soo-myung's father (cameo)
2018	Sovereign Default	

=== Television series ===
Year	Title	Role	Notes/Ref.
2007	H.I.T	Shin Il-young	
2007	Thank You		
2007	In-soon Is Pretty	Seo Kyung-joon	
2009	Cain and Abel		
2009	The Slingshot		
2009	Queen Seondeok	Yeom-jong	
2009	Three Men	Yoon Da-hoon's golf course president	
2011	Warrior Baek Dong-soo	Baek Sa-king	
2011	The Peak	Park Yi-man	
2011	The Princess' Man	Yi Gae	
2011	You're Here, You're Here, You're Really Here	President Gong	
2012	Syndrome	Park Sun-woo	
2012	Feast of the Gods	Go Jae-chul	Cameo
2012	Queen and I	Minister Min	
2012	Golden Time	Kim Min-joon	
2012	School 2013	Uhm Dae-woong	
2013	Nine	Oh Chul-min	
2013	Gu Family Book	Park Mu-sol	
2013	Empire of Gold	Choi Won-jae	
2013	Two Weeks	Han Jung-woo	
2013	My Love from the Star	Cheon Min-goo	
2014	12 Years Promise	Jang Gook's father	
2014	Big Man	Kang Sung-wook	
2014	Gunman in Joseon	Jung Hwe-ryung	
2014	Secret Door	Min Baek-sang	
2014	KBS Drama Special: "We All Cry Differently"	Ryu Jung-chul	
2014	Liar Game	Nam Da-jung's father	
2015	Heart to Heart	Go Jae-woong	
2015	Life Tracker Lee Jae-goo	Kim Tae-soo	
2015	Beating Again		
2015	Splendid Politics	Hong Yeong	
2015	Remember	Prosecutor Hong Moo-suk	
2016	The Doctors	Jin Myung-hoon	
2016	Shopping King Louie	Kim Ho-joon	
2017	The Emperor: Owner of the Mask		
2017	Stranger	Park Moo-sung	
2017	The King in Love	Lee Seung-hyu	
2017	Live Up to Your Name	Heo Jun	
2017	I'm Not a Robot	Doctor Oh	
2017	While You Were Sleeping	Park Jun-mo	Special appearance
2018	Life	Lee Sang-yeop	
2018	My Secret Terrius	Shim Woo-cheol	
2018	My Strange Hero	Kim Gwi-chang	
2019	He Is Psychometric	Eun Byung-ho	
2019	Doctor John	Kang I-moon	
2019	Extraordinary You	Eun Moo-young	
2020	Do Do Sol Sol La La Sol	Goo Man-Su	
2020	Tale of the Nine Tailed	Kwon Hae-ryong	
2020	Start-Up	Won Doo-jung	
2020–2021	Royal Secret Agent		
2021	Youth of May	Lee Chang-geun	
2021–2022	The King of Tears, Lee Bang-won	Yi Bang-woo	
2022	One Dollar Lawyer	Kim Chun-gil	Cameo
2022	The Forbidden Marriage	Ye Hyun-ho	
2023	Battle for Happiness		Special appearance
2023–2024	The Story of Park's Marriage Contract	Inspector Park Jae-won	Special appearance
2024	Captivating the King	Oh Wook-hwan	

=== Web series ===
Year	Title	Role	Ref.
2022	Kiss Sixth Sense	Kim Hae-jin	
