= The King of Tears, Lee Bang-won =

2021–2022 South Korean television series

- Promotional poster
- Hangul: 태종 이방원
- Hanja: 太宗 李芳遠
- RR: Taejong I Bangwon
- MR: T'aejong I Pangwŏn
- Genre: Historical; Action; Political thriller
- Created by: KBS Drama Division
- Written by: Lee Jung-woo
- Directed by: Kim Hyung-il; Shim Jae-hyun
- Starring: Joo Sang-wook; Park Jin-hee; Kim Yeong-cheol
- Narrated by: Kim Do-hyun
- Composer: Choi In-hee
- Country of origin: South Korea
- Original language: Korean
- No. of episodes: 32

Production
- Executive producer: Kang Byung-taek (KBS)
- Producer: Hwang Eui-kyung
- Production location: Mungyeong Saejae Drama Set
- Production company: Monster Union

Original release
- Network: KBS1
- Release: December 11, 2021 – May 1, 2022

The King of Tears, Lee Bang-won (Korean: 태종 이방원) is a South Korean television series starring Joo Sang-wook in the title role. With this series, KBS revived its historical drama series after 5 years, as the last KBS historical series Jang Yeong-sil was aired in 2016. It depicts the story of Yi Bang-won, the third king of Joseon, from a new perspective (unrelated to 1996–98 TV series Tears of the Dragon). It premiered on KBS1 on December 11, 2021, and aired on Saturdays and Sundays at 21:40 (KST) till May 1, 2022.

== Synopsis ==
The King of Tears, Yi Bang-won sheds new light on leader Yi Bang-won, who took the initiative to establish the Empire of Joseon during the end of the Goryeo Dynasty and early Joseon Dynasty when the ancient order of Goryeo was destroyed and the new order of Joseon was created.

== Cast ==
=== Main ===
- Joo Sang-wook as Yi Bang-won, King Taejong, the 3rd King of Joseon. Known as "Duke Jeongan" (정안공; 靖安公).
- Kim Yeong-cheol as Yi Seong-gye, King Taejo, the founder and 1st King of Joseon.
- Park Jin-hee as Queen Wongyeong, the 3rd Queen Consort of Joseon.
- Ye Ji-won as Queen Sindeok, the 1st Queen Consort of Joseon.

=== Supporting ===
==== Queen Shinui's family ====
- Um Hyo-sup as Yi Bang-woo, "Grand Prince Jinan" (진안대군; 鎭安大君).
- Kim Myung-soo as Yi Bang-gwa, King Jeongjong, the 2nd King of Joseon. "Prince Yeong-an" (영안군; 永安君).
- Hong Kyung-in (Note: Hong Kyung-in's first acting project after 3 years since Voice 2 (보이스 2)) as Yi Bang-ui, "Grand Prince Ik-ahn" (익안대군; 益安大君).
- Jo Soon-chang as Yi Bang-gan, "Grand Prince Hoi-an" (회안대군; 懷安大君).
- Kim Chae-rin as Princess Gyeongshin, Yi Seong-gye and Queen Sinui's 1st daughter.
- Cheon Ji-won as Princess Gyeongseon, Yi Seong-gye and Queen Sinui's 2nd daughter.
- Kim Seo-yeon as Queen Jeongan, the 2nd Queen Consort of Joseon.

==== Queen Sindeok's family ====
- Oh Seung-joon as Yi Bang-beon, Yi Seong-gye's 7th son from Queen Sindeok.
  - Hong Dong-young as young Yi Bang-beon
- Kim Jin-sung as Yi Bang-seok
  - Jang Jae-ha as young Yi Bang-seok

Yi Seong-gye's 8th son from Queen Sindeok, Yi Bang-won's half little brother and Joseon's first crown prince.

- Jang Tae-hoon as Yi Je, Princess Gyeongsun's husband.
- Choi Da-hye as Princess Gyeongsun, Yi Seong-gye and Queen Sindeok's daughter.
- Lee Ha-eun as Lady Ryu Hyun-bin

As Bang-seok's wife, she later causes an adultery case with the eunuch Yi Man.

- Han Yoon-ji as Princess Gyeongnyeong, wife of Yi Bang-beon.

==== Yi Bang-won's family ====
- Kim Min-gi as Yi Do, Prince Chungnyeong.
  - Gu Hyun as 5-year-old Yi Do
  - Joo An as 1-year-old Yi Do
  - Kim Ro-woon as baby Yi Do
- Lee Tae-ri as Yi Je, Prince Yangnyeong.
  - Kim Joon-ui as 8-year-old Yi Je
  - Kim In-woo as 4-year-old Yi Je
- Jung Shi-hoon as Yi Bo, Prince Hyoryeong.
  - Shin Seo-woo as 7-year-old Yi Bo
- Im Ye-jin as young Princess Jeongsun, Yi Bang-won and Queen Wongyeong's 1st daughter.
- Lee Do-yeon as Princess Gyeongjeong, Yi Bang-won and Queen Wongyeong's 2nd daughter.
  - Park Soo-eon as young Princess Gyeongjeong
- Lee Ye-seo as Princess Gyeongan, Yi Bang-won and Queen Wongyeong's 3rd daughter.
- Kim Vi-ju as Queen Soheon.

==== Yi Seong-gye's family ====
- Ye Soo-jung^{*} as Queen Sinui, Yi Seong-gye's first wife and Yi Bang-gwa & Yi Bang-won's mother.
- Lee Won-bal (Note: Lee Won-bal's first acting project after 3 years since KBS2 Drama Special My Mom's Third Marriage (엄마의 세번째 결혼)) as Yi Hwa, Yi Seong-gye's half little brother. "Grand Prince Ui-ahn" (의안대군; 義安大君).
- Ban Sang-yoon as Yi Cheon-u, Yi Seong-gye's older brother.

==== Chonghae Yi clan ====
- Seon Dong-hyuk as Yi Ji-ran

One of Joseon's founding helper and Yi Seong-gye's brother-in-law.

- Tae Hang-ho as Yi Hwa-sang, Yi Ji-ran's eldest son.

==== Queen Wongyeong's family ====
- Kim Kyu-chul as Min Je, Queen Wongyeong's father.
- Lee Eung-kyung as Lady Song of the Yeosan Song clan, Queen Wongyeong's mother.
- Kim Tae-han (Note: Nam Sung-jin is husband of Kim Ji-young and Kim Tae-han is her younger brother.) as Min Mu-gu, Queen Wongyeong's first younger brother.
- Noh Sang-bo as Min Mu-jil, Queen Wongyeong's second younger brother.

==== Yi Bang-won's political comrades ====
- Park Yoo-seung as Yoon So-jong, a politician in the early Joseon dynasty and at the end of the Goryeo dynasty.
- Nam Sung-jin as Ha Ryun.
- Kim Bup-rae as Jo Young-mu, one of Joseon's founding helper and the public relations.
- Kim Geon as Jo Young-gyu, Yi Bang-won's person who helps him in the Seonjuk Bridge's accident.
- Noh Young-guk (Note: Noh Young-guk's first acting project after 5 years since Sweet Stranger and Me (우리집에 사는 남자)) as Jo Jun, a Chwaŭijŏng and one of Joseon's founding helper.
- Kim Young-gi (Note: Kim Young-gi's first acting project after 5 years since First Love Again (다시, 첫사랑)) as Kwon Geun, a politician in the early Joseon dynasty and the end of the Goryeo dynasty.
- Park Chil-yong (Note: Park Chil-yong's first acting project after 6 years since The Jingbirok: A Memoir of Imjin War (징비록)) as Nam Jae
- Jung Tae-woo (Note: Jung Tae-woo's small-screen comeback after 4 years since Criminal Minds (크리미널 마인드)) as Yi Suk-beon
- Lee Hyun-kyun as Park Eun
- Kang Ji-sub (Note: Kang Ji-sub's first acting project after 4 years since Bravo My Life (브라보 마이 라이프)) as Hwang Hui
- Cha Ki-hwan as Yi Geo-yi
- Im Ho as Yu Jeong-hyeon

==== Yi Seong-gye's political comrades ====
- First strife of crown prince
  - Lee Kwang-gi (Note: Lee Kwang-gi's first acting project after 6 years since The Jingbirok: A Memoir of Imjin War (징비록) and A Break Alone (나홀로 휴가), which was his last film to be filmed in the same year) as Jeong Do-jeon, one of Joseon's founding helper.
  - Lee Ki-yeol (Note: Lee Ki-yeol's first acting project after 4 years since Super Family (초인가족 2017)) as Nam Eun
  - Lee Kyung-young (Note: Lee Kyung-young's first acting project after 3 years since Crazy City (미친도시), a South Korean independent film) as Sim Hyo-saeng
  - Lee Woo-seok as Park Wi
- Second strife of crown prince
  - Ahn Hong-jin (Note: Ahn Hong-jin's first acting project after 3 years since Lady Cha Dal-rae's Lover (차달래 부인의 사랑)) as Park Po
  - Park Jang-ho as Yi Maeng-jong, Prince Uiryeong.
- Jo Sa-eui's rebellion
  - Jung Eui-gap as Jo Sa-eui

==== Goryeo people ====
- Choi Jong-hwan as Jeong Mong-joo, the last loyalist of Goryeo.
- Im Ji-kyu as King Woo, the 32nd King of Goryeo.
- Song Yong-tae (Note: Song Yong-tae's first acting project after 3 years since The Guest (손 the guest)) as Choi Young.
- Nam Myung-ryul as Yi Saek

Both of Jeong Do-jeon, Jeong Mong-ju, Ha-Ryun, Yoon So-jong, Yi Soong-in's teacher and a spiritual leader in the Shinjin Grand Temple, also the later Goryeo's warrior.

- Im Byung-gi as Byun An-ryeol
- Park Sang-jo (Note: Park Sang-jo's first acting project after 13 years since The Great King, Sejong (대왕 세종)) as Jo Min-soo, a warrior in the later Goryeo who cause a revolt with Yi Seong-gye.
- Ki Eun-yoo as King Chang, the 33rd King of Goryeo.
- Park Hyung-joon as Wang Yo, King Gongyang, the last King of Goryeo.

A famous general in the end of Goryeo dynasty who oppose Yi Seong-gye's new dynasty.

- Kim Bo-mi as Lady Ahn, Consort Jeong

The eldest member in the Goryeo Royal household who later gave the royal seal to General Yi Seong-gye which ended the Goryeo dynasty.

- Choi Eun-seok (Note: Choi Eun-seok's first acting project after 4 years since A Sea of Her Own (그 여자의 바다) and The Negotiation (협상), which was his last film to be filmed in the same year) as Kim Jeo, Choi Young's nephew.
- Jo Su-hyuk as Jung Deuk-hoo
- Choi Young as Kwak Chung-bo
- Lee Chang as Choi Yoo-kyung
- Kang Bong-seong as Kim Jin-yang, the limb of Jeong Mong-joo and the one who opposes Yi Seong-gye.
- Kim Jin-gook as Jeong Mong-ju-related minister

=== Others ===
- Park Yeo-reum as an old nanny
- Choi Shi-in as gisaeng
- Lee Choon-sik as Noh Hee-bong, Taejo and Taejong's eunuch.
- Jin Zheng-gang as Zhu Yuan-zhang
- Kim Do-won as young Bul-no, a child born to Yi Bang-gwa and his concubine.

== Production ==
A reunion took place on 2011 between the actors Joo Sang-wook and Park Jin-hee after filming the Giant series.

The first script reading was held on August 24, 2021. On November 9, 2021, the production company released site images from the series.

Initially, actress Lee Deok-hee had been cast for the role of Queen Shinui, but this apparently was changed. In this drama, she portrays a mother-and-child relationship with Um Hyo-sup, again following Stranger.

On November 28, 2021, a report was confirmed that actor Ye Ji-won had tested positive for COVID-19 on November 27, and that filming would continue as scheduled except for her appearance.

On January 20, 2022, KBS released an apology for a horse's death on the set during filming of the seventh episode, when a scene was filmed showing the horse and its rider falling down. The horse's hind leg had been tied up with a wire, causing the horse to flip in the air and land on its neck. While the actor also sustained injuries, the horse died a week after the incident. KBS decided not to air two of the latest episodes originally set for release on January 22 and January 23, potentially due to the controversy.

== Viewership ==
The King of Tears, Yi Bang-won : South Korea viewers per episode (millions)

Episodes	Episode number							
Episodes	1	2	3	4	5	6	7	8
Ep. 1–8	1.536	1.536	1.458	1.544	1.508	1.156	1.299	1.815
Ep. 9–16	1.734	1.744	1.896	2.048	1.297	1.544	1.480	1.626
Ep. 17–24	1.530	1.578	1.589	1.617	1.600	1.612	1.593	1.691
Ep. 25–32	1.527	1.815	1.508	1.780	1.586	1.843	1.768	1.796

Source: Audience measurement performed nationwide by Nielsen Korea.

Average TV viewership ratings
Ep.	Original broadcast date	Average audience share		
Ep.	Original broadcast date	Nielsen Korea		TNmS
Ep.	Original broadcast date	Nationwide	Seoul	Nationwide
1	December 11, 2021	8.7% (3rd)	7.8% (4th)	7.9% (3rd)
2	December 12, 2021	9.4% (4th)	8.7% (4th)	8.6% (4th)
3	December 18, 2021	8.8% (5th)	8.0% (6th)	9.2% (3rd)
4	December 19, 2021	9.2% (4th)	8.2% (5th)	8.4% (5th)
5	December 25, 2021	8.7% (7th)	8.2% (7th)	—N/a
6	December 26, 2021	6.7% (10th)	6.1% (10th)	6.2% (12th)
7	January 1, 2022	7.4% (8th)	6.6% (9th)	5.3% (16th)
8	January 2, 2022	10.2% (5th)	9.3% (5th)	7.2% (6th)
9	January 8, 2022	10.0% (3rd)	9.2% (3rd)	8.2% (3rd)
10	January 9, 2022	10.2% (4th)	8.9% (5th)	7.5% (5th)
11	January 15, 2022	11.0% (2nd)	9.9% (2nd)	7.7% (4th)
12	January 16, 2022	11.2% (5th)	10.6% (5th)	8.4% (6th)
13	February 26, 2022 (Note: Due to extension of its delay since January 22, episode 13 and 14 were aired on February 26 and 27.)	8.0% (6th)	7.0% (6th)	6.8% (9th)
14	February 27, 2022	9.0% (5th)	8.4% (6th)	8.5% (6th)
15	March 5, 2022	8.9% (4th)	8.1% (4th)	7.0% (7th)
16	March 6, 2022	9.5% (5th)	8.8% (5th)	8.4% (5th)
17	March 12, 2022	9.0% (3rd)	8.1% (3rd)	8.4% (4th)
18	March 13, 2022	9.7% (4th)	9.4% (4th)	8.5% (5th)
19	March 19, 2022	9.9% (3rd)	8.6% (3rd)	8.7% (2nd)
20	March 20, 2022	9.9% (4th)	8.7% (4th)	9.0% (5th)
21	March 26, 2022	9.5% (2nd)	8.9% (2nd)	9.4%(2nd)
22	March 27, 2022	10.0% (4th)	9.1% (5th)	9.4% (4th)
23	April 2, 2022	10.1% (2nd)	9.1% (2nd)	—N/a
24	April 3, 2022	10.7% (4th)	9.8% (4th)	9.2% (4th)
25	April 9, 2022	9.5% (2nd)	8.1% (2nd)	—N/a
26	April 10, 2022	11.5%(3rd)	10.1% (3rd)	—N/a
27	April 16, 2022	9.3% (2nd)	8.4% (2nd)	8.3% (2nd)
28	April 17, 2022	11.7% (3rd)	10.5% (3rd)	9.5% (4th)
29	April 23, 2022	10.2% (2nd)	9.1% (2nd)	8.4% (2nd)
30	April 24, 2022	11.3% (3rd)	9.9% (3rd)	9.8% (3rd)
31	April 30, 2022	10.7% (2nd)	10.0% (2nd)	9.1% (2nd)
32	May 1, 2022	11.5% (3rd)	10.4% (3rd)	9.0% (4th)
Average		9.7%	8.8%	— (Note: Due to some ratings not recorded, the exact average rating is unknown.)
In the table above, the blue numbers represent the lowest ratings and the red numbers represent the highest ratings.

== Awards and nominations ==
Name of the award ceremony, year presented, category, nominee of the award, and the result of the nomination
Award ceremony	Year	Category	Nominee	Result	Ref.
APAN Star Awards	2022	Top Excellence Award, Actor in a Serial Drama	Joo Sang-wook	Won	
APAN Star Awards	2022	Top Excellence Award, Actress in a Serial Drama	Park Jin-hee	Won	
