= Empire of Lust =

- Theatrical release poster
- Directed by: Ahn Sang-hoon
- Written by: Kim Se-hee
- Produced by: Kim Min-gi; Bae Won-gyu
- Starring: Shin Ha-kyun; Jang Hyuk; Kang Han-na; Kang Ha-neul
- Cinematography: Son Won-ho; Ju Seong-rim; Yu Eok
- Edited by: Shin Min-kyung
- Music by: Park Ki-heon
- Production companies: Fineworks; Keymaker
- Distributed by: CJ Entertainment
- Release date: March 5, 2015
- Running time: 113 minutes
- Country: South Korea
- Language: Korean
- Budget: ₩5.4 billion
- Box office: US$3.2 million

Empire of Lust (Korean: 순수의 시대; RR: Sunsuui sidae; lit. 'The Age of Innocence') is a 2015 South Korean period action film starring Shin Ha-kyun, Jang Hyuk, Kang Han-na and Kang Ha-neul.

== Plot ==
Kim Min-jae (Shin Ha-kyun), is a brilliant general who's distinguished himself by protecting the borders of the recently established Joseon dynasty. He keeps a close eye on Yi Bang-won (Jang Hyuk), the fifth son of King Taejo (Son Byong-ho), whom he believes has ambitions of seizing the throne. Jin (Kang Ha-neul) is Kim Min-jae's son and the King's son-in-law. Due to his position as the King's son-in-law, he is unable to take part in politics and only seeks out pleasure. Yi Bang-won was instrumental in helping his father overthrow the Goryeo dynasty and found the Joseon, but was passed over when Taejo chose his successor. Meanwhile, Kim Min-jae falls in love for the first time with a gisaeng named Ka-hee (Kang Han-na), whom he takes as his concubine, not realizing that she aims to carry out a vendetta against him.

== Cast ==
- Shin Ha-kyun as Kim Min-jae
  - Sung Yoo-bin as young Kim Min-jae
- Jang Hyuk as Yi Bang-won, Grand Prince Jeongan
- Kang Han-na as Ka-hee
- Kang Ha-neul as Kim Jin (Kim Min-jae's son)
- Son Byong-ho as King Taejo
- Lee Jae-yong as Jeong Do-jeon
- Choi Moo-sung as Jo Yeong-gyu
- Kang Kyung-hun as Lady Jeong (Kim Min-jae's wife)
- Kim Da-ye as Princess Gyeongsun (Kim Jin's wife)
- Kim Gu-taek as Ha Ryun
- Gi Ju-bong as Jo Jun
- Kim Seung-gi as Yi Je
- Lee So-yoon as Sun-bun (Ka-hee's personal servant)
- Hwang Geum-hee as Mae-hyang
- Sa-hee as Lady Min (Yi Bang-won's wife)
- Kim Young as Kim Min-jae's old servant
- Moon Young-dong as Nam Eun
- Yang Young-jo as Sim Hyo-saeng
- Oh Ha-nee as Chwihangru gisaeng
- Noh Haeng-ha as Chun Hyang-ru
- Kim Wang-geun as the Head Eunuch
- Hyun Seok-jun as the Crown Prince
- Jo Hee-bong as Hwajeon shop owner (cameo)
