= Heonilleung =

Royal tomb in South Korea

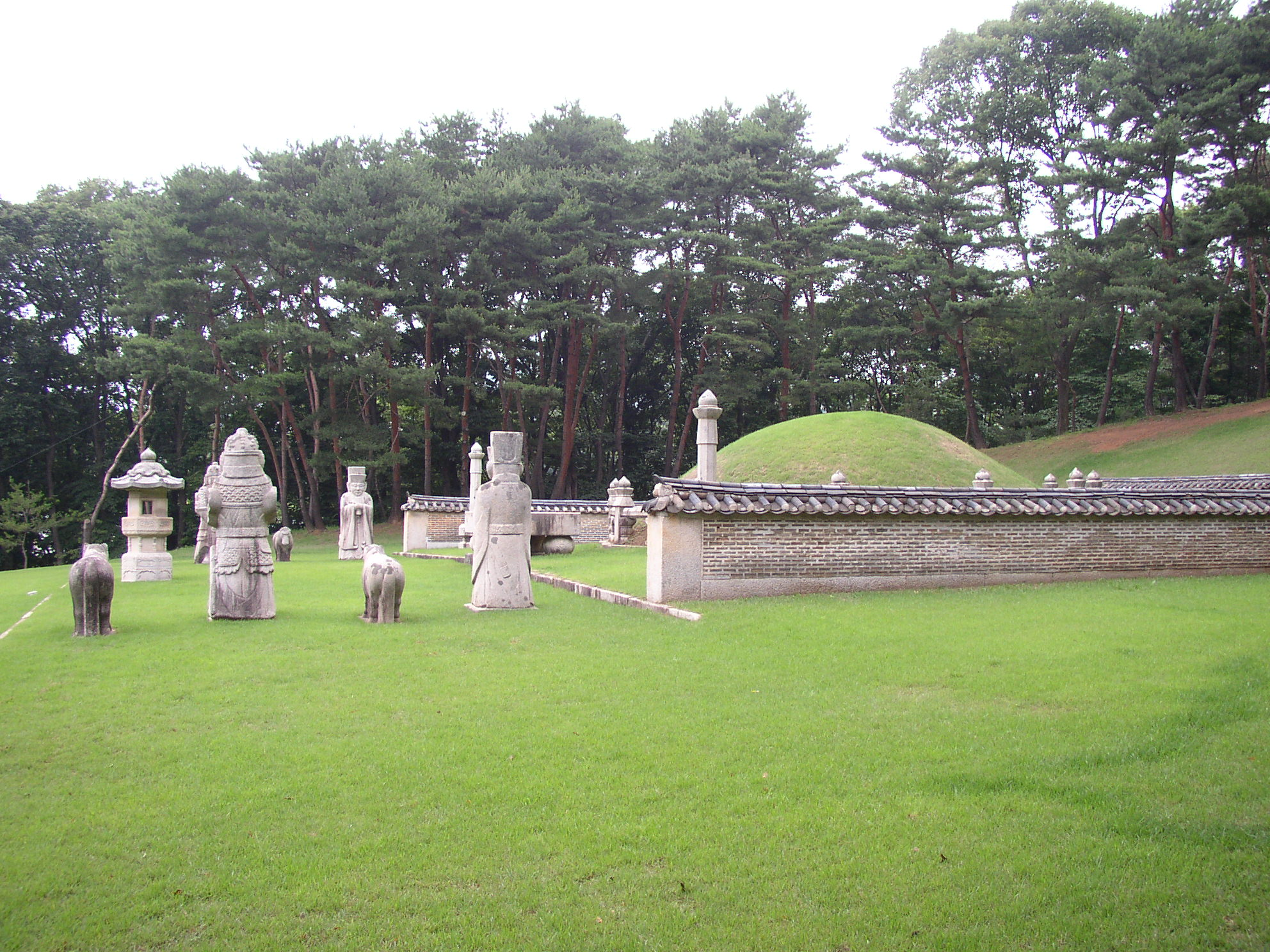
- Illeung
- Interactive map of Heonilleung
- 37.464985°N 127.081779°E
- Location: 34 Heonilleung-gil, Seocho District, Seoul, South Korea

Site notes
- Governing body: Cultural Heritage Administration of Korea

UNESCO World Heritage Site
- Type: Cultural
- Criteria: iii, iv, vi
- Designated: 2009 (33rd session)
- Reference no.: 1319
- Region: Asia and Australasia

Historic Sites of South Korea
- Official name: Heolleung and Illeung Royal Tombs, Seoul
- Designated: 1970-05-26
- Reference no.: 194

Korean name
- Hangul: 헌인릉
- Hanja: 獻仁陵
- RR: Heonilleung
- MR: Hŏnillŭng

Heonilleung (Korean: 헌인릉; Hanja: 獻仁陵) is a burial ground from the Joseon dynasty, located in Seocho District, Seoul. This is where King Taejong and King Sunjo are entombed, along with their wives, Queen Wongyeong and Queen Sunwon.

== Characteristics ==
Heolleung is made up of twin mounds connected by railings, with the king entombed in the left one, while the queen is in the right one.

Illeung consists of one mound only, that houses both the king and the queen. King Sunjo was originally buried in Jangneung in Paju, but his tomb was moved to the current location in 1856 due to auspicious reasons of geomancy.

Tomb	Deceased	Year
Heolleung (헌릉)	Taejong of Joseon; Queen Wongyeong	1420
Illeung (인릉)	Sunjo of Joseon; Queen Sunwon	1856
