= Queen Sinŭi =

Queen of Joseon (1337–1391)

Queen Sinui
- Queen Consort of Joseon (posthumously); Empress Consort of Korea (posthumously)
- Born: 6 October 1337; Ssangseong Prefecture, Yuan Empire
- Died: 25 November 1391 (aged 54); Hamhung Royal Villa, Dongbuk-myeon, Goryeo
- Burial: Cherung, Kaesong, North Korea
- Spouse: Yi Seong-gye (later King Taejo) (m. 1351)
- Issue Detail: 6 sons, 2 daughters
Posthumous name
- Joseon: Queen Seungin Sunseong Sinui (승인순성신의왕후; 承仁順聖神懿王后); Korean Empire: Empress Seungin Sunseong Sinui Go (승인순성신의고황후; 承仁順聖神懿高皇后)
- Clan: Cheongju Han (by birth); Jeonju Yi (by marriage)
- Dynasty: Yi
- Father: Han Gyeong, Internal Prince Ancheon
- Mother: Grand Princess Consort of Samhan State, of the Saknyeong Shin clan
- Religion: Buddhism

Korean name
- Hangul: 신의왕후
- Hanja: 神懿王后
- RR: Sinui wanghu
- MR: Sinŭi wanghu

Queen Sinui (Korean: 신의왕후; Hanja: 神懿王后; 6 October 1337 – 25 November 1391), (Note: In the Korean calendar (lunisolar), she was born on the 4th day of the 9th lunar month and died on the 23rd day of the 9th lunar month.) of the Cheongju Han clan, was the first wife of Yi Seong-gye, the founder of Joseon, and the mother of King Jeongjong and King Taejong. She was posthumously elevated to the position of queen upon her second son's accession to the throne. Following the establishment of the Korean Empire, she was honored as Empress Sinuigo.

== Biography ==
=== Early life and lineage ===
The future Queen Sinui was born during the reign of King Chungsuk of Goryeo, as the elder daughter among five sons and two daughters. Her father was Han Gyeong (한경) and her mother was a lady from the Saknyeong Shin clan (삭녕 신씨).

She came from the Cheongju Han clan, a deeply-rooted lineage that had risen from local gentry during the late Silla period to central government elites in Goryeo, gradually cementing their standing among the ruling aristocratic houses through bureaucratic service and strategic marriages. In some sources, Lady Han has also been noted as a member of the Anbyeon Han clan (안변 한씨); this is because she descended from its founder, Han Ryeon (한련), himself a ninth-generation descendant of Han Ran (한란), the progenitor of the Cheongju Han clan.

=== Marriage ===
In 1351, at the age of 14, Lady Han was arranged to marry the 16-year-old Yi Seong-gye. She gave birth to six sons and two daughters between 1354 and the 1380s, and while Yi Seong-gye was on the battlefield, she took care of the household affairs in his hometown.

During the Goryeo period, aristocratic men were allowed two wives; one wife was known as the gyeongcheo (경처), the capital wife, while the other wife was known as the hyangcheo (향처), the countryside wife. In Gaegyeong, Yi Seong-gye welcomed Lady Kang, the younger daughter of Kang Yun-seong from the aristocratic Goksan Kang clan, as his second (gyeongcheo) wife in the late 1360s or early 1370s.

=== Death and aftermath ===
Lady Han died at the age of 54, shortly before the founding of Joseon. She was buried within Cherung (제릉) in present-day Kaesong, North Korea.

A year after Lady Han's death, Yi Seong-gye founded Joseon and became its first king (posthumously King Taejo), while Lady Kang became its first queen (posthumously Queen Sindeok). Soon after, Lady Han received the honorific title jeol (절; lit. ''faithful''), (Note: Her title during this time has been rendered as Queen Jeol (절비; 節妃) in English. However, the literal translation of bi (빈; 嬪) is simply "consort", as opposed to wangbi (왕비; 王妃) and wanghu (왕후; 王后), whose literal translation is "king's consort" and which were the titles used during the Joseon period for a living and deceased queen consort, respectively.) and in 1398, upon the accession to the throne of her second son, Yi Bang-gwa (posthumously King Jeongjong), she was conferred the posthumous name Sinui (신의; lit. ''divine and exemplary'').

Following the death of Queen Sindeok in 1396, Lady Han's fifth son, Yi Bang-won (posthumously King Taejong), orchestrated a coup d'état while King Taejo was in mourning for his second wife. The coup led to the deaths of Jeong Do-jeon and his supporters, as well as the elimination of Queen Sindeok's two sons, Yi Bang-beon (이방번) and Yi Bang-seok. This incident came to be known as the First Strife of the Princes.

== Titles ==
- During the second reign of King Chungsuk (r. 1332–1339):
  - Lady, of the Cheongju Han clan (청주 한씨; 安邊韓氏; from 6 October 1337)
    - Han Gyeong's daughter (한경의 딸)
    - Lady Han (한씨; 韓氏)
- During the reign of King Gongmin (r. 1351–1374):
  - Mistress Wonsintaek (Note: Or Mistress of Wonsin (Note: lit. ''primary and honest'') Residence.) (원신택주; 元信宅主; from 1364)
- During the reign of King Taejo (r. 1392–1398):
  - Queen Jeol (절비; 節妃; from 1392)
- During the reign of King Jeongjong (r. 1398–1400):
  - Queen Sinui (신의왕후; 神懿王后; from 1398)
- During the reign of King Taejong (r. 1400–1418):
  - Queen Dowager Sinui (신의왕태후; 神懿王太后; from 1408)
- During the reign of King Sukjong (r. 1674–1720):
  - Queen Sinui (신의왕후; 神懿王后; from 1683)
- During the reign of Emperor Gojong (r. 1897 (Note: Reigned as king from 1864 to 1897.)–1907):
  - Empress Sinuigo (신의고황후; 神懿高皇后; from 1899)

== Family ==
- Father: Han Gyeong (한경), Internal Prince Ancheon (안천부원군)
- Mother: Grand Princess Consort of Samhan State (삼한국대부인), of the Saknyeong Shin clan (삭녕 신씨)
- Sibling(s)
  - Han Seong-gi (한성기)
  - Han Chang-su (한창수) (Note: Full brother.)
  - Han Geum-gang (한금강)
  - Han Yung-jeon (한융전) (Note: Half-brother.)
  - Han Geom (한검)
  - Lady, of the Cheongju Han clan (청주 한씨) (Note: Married Mun Won-jwa (문원좌), Prince Gaeryeong (개령군).)
- Husband: Yi Seong-gye (이성계), King Taejo (태조대왕; 4 November 1335 – 27 June 1408)
  - Father-in-law: Yi Ja-chun (이자춘), King Hwanjo (환조대왕; 1315 – 3 May 1360)
  - Mother-in-law: Queen Uihye (의혜왕후), of the Yeongheung Choe clan (영흥 최씨; ?–1336)
- Issue
  - Yi Bang-u (이방우), Grand Prince Jinan (진안대군; 1354 – 23 January 1394)
  - Yi Bang-gwa (이방과), King Jeongjong (정종대왕; 26 July 1357 – 24 October 1419)
  - Yi Bang-ui (이방의), Grand Prince Ikan (익안대군; 1360 – 7 November 1404) (Note: ▪︎Wife: Grand Princess Consort of Samhan State (삼한국대부인), of the Dongju Choe clan (동주 최씨); daughter of Choe In-du (최인두). ▪︎Issue: 2 sons (1 concubine-born son), 2 daughters.)
  - Yi Bang-gan (이방간), Grand Prince Hoean (회안대군; 7 August 1364 – 10 April 1421)
  - Yi Bang-won (이방원), King Taejong (태종대왕; 21 June 1367 – 8 June 1422)
  - Yi Bang-yeon (이방연), Grand Prince Deokan (덕안대군; ?–1388) (Note: ▪︎Wife: none. ▪︎Issue: 1 adopted son.)
  - Princess Gyeongsin (경신공주; ? – 8 May 1426) (Note: Married Yi Ae (이애), Internal Prince Sangdang (상당부원군; 1363–1414) from the Cheongju Yi clan (청주 이씨); eldest son of Yi Geo-yi (이거이), Internal Prince Seowon (서원부원군; 1348–1412). They had issue (1 son).)
  - Princess Gyeongseon (경선공주) (Note: Married Shim Jong (심종), Prince Cheongwon (청원군; ?–1418) from the Cheongsong Shim clan (청송 심씨); sixth son of Shim Deok-bu (심덕부; 1328–1401) and younger brother of Shim On. They had issue (1 daughter).)

== Ancestry ==
Han Yu (한유)
Han Gyu-in (한규인)
Han Gyeong, Internal Prince Ancheon (안천부원군 한경)
Queen Sinui
Shin Yun-ryeo (신윤려)
Grand Princess Consort of Samhan State, of the Saknyeong Shin clan (삼한국대부인 삭녕 신씨)

== In popular culture ==
- Portrayed by Tae Hyun-sil in the 1983 KBS1 TV series Foundation of the Kingdom.
- Portrayed by Kim So-won in the 1983 MBC TV series 500 Year of Joseon: The King of Chudong Palace.
- Portrayed by Han Young-sook in the 1996–1998 KBS1 TV series Tears of the Dragon.
- Portrayed by Ye Soo-jung in the 2021–2022 KBS1 TV series The King of Tears, Lee Bang-won.

== See also ==
- Consort kin
- Styles and titles in Joseon
- History of Korea
