= Grand Prince Hoean =

Joseon prince (1364–1421)

Yi Panggan
- Prince Hoean of Joseon (회안군); Grand Prince Hoean of Joseon (회안대군)

Duke Mahan of Joseon 마한공
- Born: Yi Panggan (이방간); 2 July 1364; Gwiju-dong, Hamheung, Hamgyong Province, Goryeo
- Died: 10 April 1421 (aged 56); Jeonju, North Jeolla Province, Joseon
- Burial: Deokjin District, Jeonju, North Jeolla Province
- Spouse: Internal Princess Consort Min; Internal Princess Consort Hwang; Princess Consort Kŭmnŭng
- Issue: Prince Uiryeong; Prince Ch'angnyŏng; Princess Sŏnghye; Princess Sinhye; Princess Yanghye; Prince Kŭmsŏng; Prince Kŭmsan
- House: House of Yi
- Father: Taejo of Joseon
- Mother: Queen Sinui of the Anbyeon Han clan
- Religion: Confucianism

Grand Prince Hoean (Korean: 회안대군; 2 July 1364 – 10 April 1421), personal name Yi Panggan (이방간), was royal prince during the early Joseon Dynasty. He was the fourth son of King Taejo and Queen Sinui.

== Biography ==
In 1364, Yi Panggan was born in Hamgyong Province as the fourth son of Yi Sŏnggye and Lady Han of the Cheongju Han clan.

He married Lady Min, daughter of Min Sŏn (민선), the couple had only one son and daughter. His second wife was Lady Hwang, daughter of Hwang Hyeong (황형), with whom he had four children (1 son and 2 daughters).

Lasty, he married Lady Kŭm, daughter of Kŭm Inbae (금인배). Yi Panggan had two more sons with his third wife.

After the First Strife of the Princes which resulted in the killing of Chŏng Tojŏn and Nam Eun, Yi Pangwŏn's only rival for the throne was his elder brother Yi Panggan (Jeongjong). Jeongjong had no sons to succeed him and planned on passing the throne to Yi Pangwŏn. Prince Hoean became jealous of his younger brother, Pangwŏn, and in 1400 led a coup d'etat (the Second Strife of the Princes) against him. Both princes had built personal armies in secret. Yi Pangwŏn was able to defeat his brother's army. After the coup, Prince Hoean was exiled and his supporters were killed.

== Family ==
Parents

- Father: Taejo of Joseon (4 November 1335 – 27 June 1408)
  - Paternal Grandfather: Yi Chach'un (1315 – 1 January 1361)
  - Paternal Grandmother: Queen Ŭihye of the Yeongheung Choe clan
- Mother: Queen Sinŭi of the Cheongju Han clan (September 1337 – 21 October 1391)
  - Maternal Grandfather: Han Kyŏng, Internal Prince Anch'ŏn (한경 안천부원군)
  - Maternal Grandmother: Grand Lady of Samhan State of the Sangnyeong Shin clan (삼한국대부인 삭녕 신씨)

Consorts and their Respective Issue(s):

- Internal Princess Consort Min of the Yeoheung Min clan (삼한국대부인 여흥 민씨; 1363–1407)
  - Yi Maengjung, Prince Ŭiryŏng (의령군 이맹중; 15 February 1385 – 11 July 1423), first son
  - Princess Sŏnghye (성혜옹주; 1387–1431), first daughter
- Internal Princess Consort Hwang of the Miryang Hwang clan (삼한국대부인 밀양 황씨; 1370–?)
  - Yi T'ae, Prince Ch'angnyŏng (창녕군 이태; 1389 – 15 October 1451), second son
  - Princess Sinhye (신혜옹주; 1410–?), second daughter
  - Princess Yanghye (양혜옹주; 1413–?), third daughter
- Princess Consort Kŭmnŭng of the Gimpo Geum clan (금릉부부인 김포 금씨; 1380–1458)
  - Yi Sŏn, Prince Kŭmsŏng (금성군 이선; 1409–?), third son
  - Yi Jonggun, Prince Kŭmsan (9 February 1413 – 18 September 1478), fourth son
- Concubine Pak of the Chuncheon Park clan (춘천 박씨; 1391–?)
- Concubine Paekjong (백종; 1390–?)

== In popular culture ==
- Portrayed by Kim Joo-young in the 1983 KBS TV series Foundation of the Kingdom.
- Portrayed by Kim Joo-young in the 1996–1998 KBS TV series Tears of the Dragon.
- Portrayed by Kang Shin-hyo in the 2015–2016 SBS TV series Six Flying Dragons.
