= Hamhung Royal Villa =

Villa in Hamhung, North Korea

Coordinates: 39.834179°N 127.618303°E

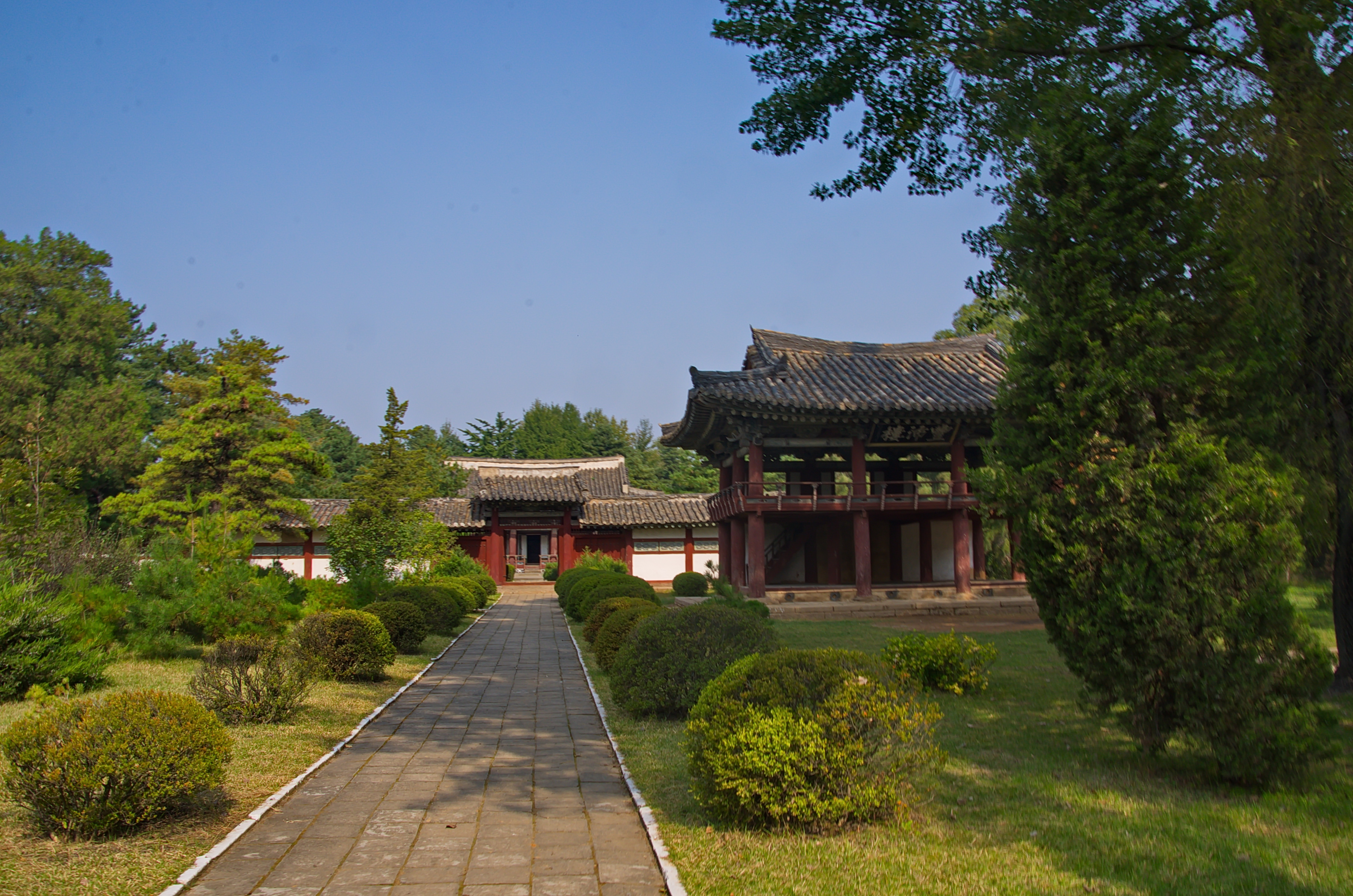

Korean name
- Chosŏn'gŭl: 함흥본궁
- Hancha: 咸興本宮
- Revised Romanization: Hamheungbongung
- McCune–Reischauer: Hamhŭngbon'gung

Hamheung Royal Villa (Korean: 함흥본궁; Hanja: 咸興本宮) is a villa located in Sonamudong, Sapogu Station, Hamheung. Designated National Treasure no. 107 of North Korea, the villa was the residence of Yi Seong-gye before he founded the Joseon Dynasty. The villa was also the birthplace Taejo's older offspring, including his second son (Yi Bang-gwa, 1357–1419, later Jeongjong of Joseon, the second king) and his fifth son (Yi Bang-won, 1367–1422, later Taejong of Joseon, the third king). After he abdicated in 1398 in favor of Jeongjong, Taejo rebuilt his residence at the site of his ancestor's land.

== History ==
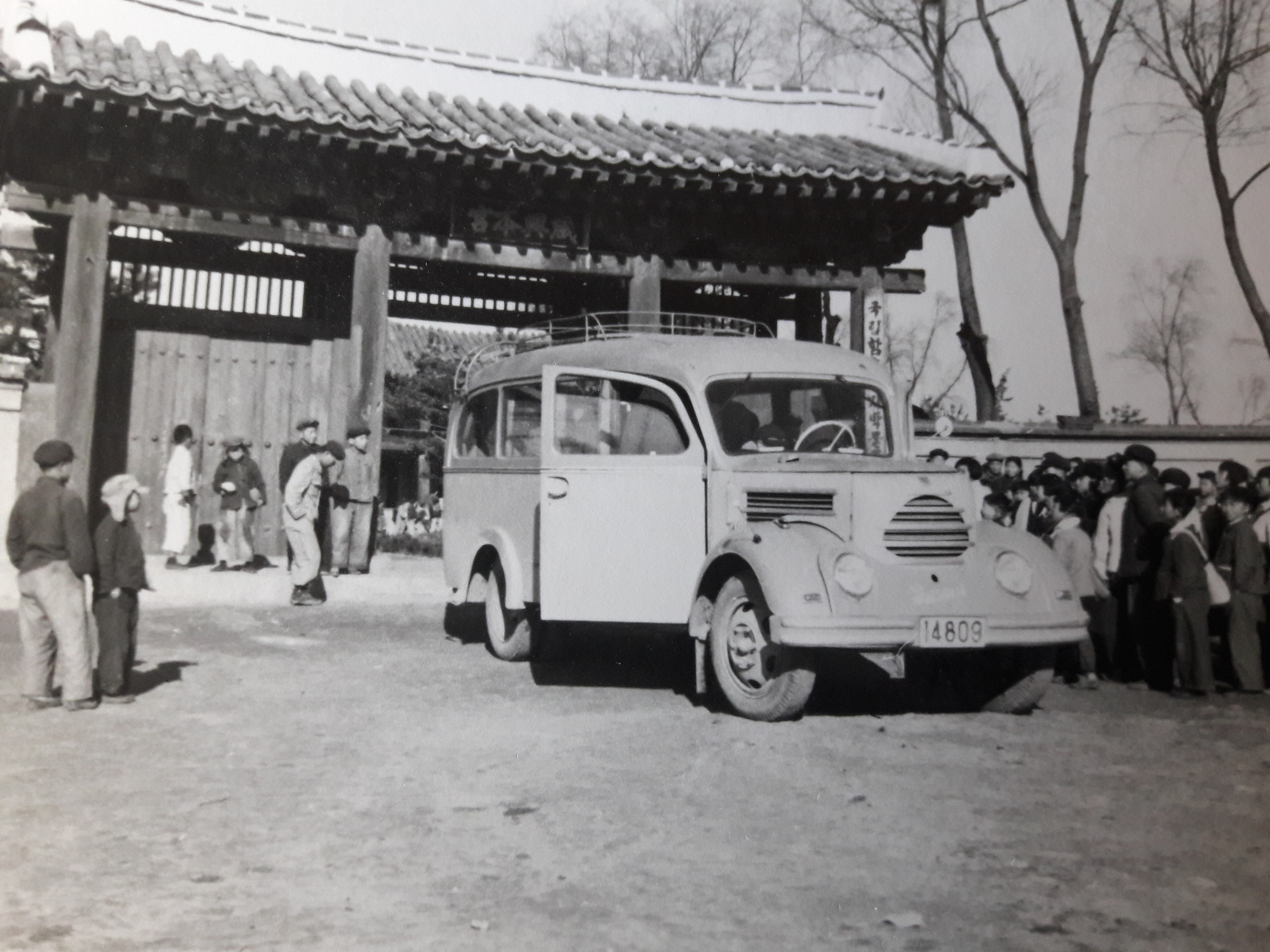
German Working Group Hamheung staffs at Royal Villa (circa. 1950s)

The founder of Joseon had lived here before he came to Hanyang to move the formal capital, Kaesong of Goryeo to the new land. After his second son succeeded the power, however, he did not stay at Hanyang, hoping to go to Hamheung.

At the time, there were several conflicts among his sons to take the throne and several faithful subjects were murdered amid the rebellions. The center of the bloody rebellion was the fifth son, almost forcing his brother to leave the throne. Angered by this incident, the founder did not encounter any envoys sent by his fifth son, Taejong of Joseon who eventually gained power as the third king. Taejo used to kill or confine the envoys. This became the root of the Korean proverb, 함흥차사 (Hamheungchasa): he went in - he never came back.

After the death of Taejo, the villa was used as the shrine to pay tribute for his family over 4 generations. The villa firstly featured royal architecture and norms, but the original structure was set on fire during Japanese invasions of Korea (1592–1598) and it was rebuilt in the late 17th century. Although some parts of the villa were destroyed during the Korean War, most parts have been restored.

The main building has 5 quarters each 15 m in length. The relics from the villa are placed in the Hamheung history museum for display.
