= The King of Chudong Palace =

1983 South Korean television series

- Cover of the Japanese DVD
- Hangul: 추동궁 마마
- RR: Chudonggung mama
- MR: Ch'udonggung mama
- Genre: Historical
- Created by: Yoo Gil-chon
- Written by: Shin Bong-seung
- Directed by: Lee Byung-hoon
- Country of origin: South Korea
- Original language: Korean
- No. of episodes: 27

Production
- Executive producer: Yu Gilchon (MBC)

Original release
- Network: MBC TV
- Release: March 31 – July 1, 1983

The King of Chudong Palace (Korean: 추동궁 마마; RR: Chudonggung mama) is a 1983 South Korean historical television series, the first installment of the drama series 500 Years of Joseon Dynasty by director Lee Byung-hoon and writer Shin Bong-seung. It aired on MBC from March 31 to July 1, 1983, for 27 episodes. It portrays the fall of Goryeo and the founding of Joseon, with the reigns of Taejo, Jeongjong and Taejong.

== Cast ==
- Bang Hoon as King U of Goryeo
- Jeon Hyeon as King Chang of Goryeo
- Kim Chang-sook as Geun-bi Yi
- Kim Woong-chul as King Gongyang of Goryeo
- Kim Young-ae as Sun-bi No
- Han Young-sook as Jeong-bi An
- Kim Ji-young as Hye-bi Yi
- Kang Suk-ran as Yeong-bi Choi
- Lee Chi-woo as Wang U, prince Jeongyang
- Lee Kyung-ho as Wang Seok, prince Jeongseong
- Kim Gil-ho as Choi Young
- Park Young-tae as Jo Min-soo
- Lee Dae-ro as Lee Saek
- Hong Gye-il as Jeong Mong-ju
- Bak Il as Lee Im
- Joo Hyun as Im Gyeon-mi
- Kim Se-yoon as Do Gil-bu
- Moon Hoe-won as Ban Bok-hae
- Oh Seung-myung as Kim Jeo
- Park Kyung-soon as Jeong Deuk-hoo
- Chae Yeong as Lady Im
- Jeong Yeong-sook as Lady Ryu
- Kim Mu-saeng as Lee Seong-gye/King Taejo of Joseon
- Kim So-won as Queen Shinui
- Kim Jung-yeon as Queen Shindeok
- Yang Il-min as Prince Wanpung
- Lee Young-hoo Lee Bang-gwa/King Jeongjong of Joseon
- Kim Hae-sook as Queen Jeongan
- Lee Jung-gil as Lee Bang-won/King Taejong of Joseon
- Kim Young-ran as Queen Wongyeong
- Kim Joo-young as Lee Bang-gan/Grand Prince Hoean
- Jeon Ho-jin as Prince Dokan
- Lee Man-sung as Prince Uian
- Song Ki-yoon as Prince Yangnyeong
- Jeon In-taek as Lee Bang-woo/Prince Jinan
- Lee Joo-hoe as Princess Jeongso
- Hwang Chi-hoon as Crown Prince Lee Hyang
- Kim Al-eum as Lee Yu/Prince Jinyang
- Lee Min-woo as Lee Gan/Prince Huryeong
- Lee Ho-jae as Jeong Do-jeon
- Byun Hee-bong as Nam Eun
- Hyun Suk as Jo Joon
- Shin Choong-shik as Ha Ryun
- Kang Sung-wook as Min Je
- Kim Hee-ra as Lee Suk-beon
- Im Young-gyu as Buma Yije
- Baek In-chul as Mok In-hae
- Gook Jung-hwan as Lee Ji-ran
