= Chungju Ji clan =

Korean clan from North Chungcheong Province

- Country: Korea
- Current region: Chungju
- Founder: Ji Gyeong
- Connected members: Ji So-yun; Ji Chang-wook; Ji Il-joo; Ji Jin-hee; Ji Suk-jin; Ji Min-hyuk; Ji Seung-hyun (actor); Ji Ha-yoon
- Website: http://www.chungjuji.org/

Chungju Ji clan (Korean: 충주 지씨; Hanja: 忠州 池氏) is one of the Korean clans. Their Bon-gwan is in Chungju, North Chungcheong Province. According to the research held in 2015, the number of Chungju Ji clan’s member was 148,144. Their founder was Ji Gyeong who was the Chinese envoy dispatched to Goryeo from Song dynasty in 960. His lineage can be traced back to Prince Chi of Qin, the son of King Huiwen. After Ji Jong hae (Hanja: 池宗海), a 6th generation descendant of Ji Gyeong, worked as Jinzi Guanglu Daifu (Hanja: 金紫光祿大夫), Ji Jong hae (Hanja: 池宗海) became Prince of Chungju. Ji Jong hae (Hanja: 池宗海) founded Chungju Ji clan and made Chungju, Chungju Ji clan’s Bon-gwan.

== See also ==
- Korean clan names of foreign origin
