= Grand Prince Chinan =

Korean prince (1354–1394)

- Born: Yi Pangu; 1354; Heungseok-ri, Yeongheung-myeon, Hwaryeong County, Hamgyeong Province, Goryeo
- Died: 15 January 1394 (aged 39–40); Hamheung-mok, Hamju-bu, Dongbok-myeon, Joseon
- Spouse(s): Lady Ji of the Chungju Ji clan (m.1375); Lady Wang of the Haeju Wang clan
- Clan: Jeonju Yi clan
- Dynasty: House of Yi
- Father: Taejo of Joseon
- Mother: Queen Sinui
- Religion: Buddhism → Korean Confucianism (Neo-Confucianism)

Korean name
- Hangul: 이방우
- Hanja: 李芳雨
- RR: I Bangu
- MR: I Pangu

Royal title
- Hangul: 진안대군
- Hanja: 鎭安大君
- RR: Jinan daegun
- MR: Chinan taegun

Art name
- Hangul: 청덕
- Hanja: 淸德
- RR: Cheongdeok
- MR: Ch'ŏngdŏk

Posthumous name
- Hangul: 경효, 정의
- Hanja: 敬孝, 靖懿
- RR: Gyeonghyo, Jeongui
- MR: Kyŏnghyo, Chŏngŭi

Grand Prince Chinan (Korean: 진안대군; Hanja: 鎭安大君; 1354 – 15 January 1394), personal name Yi Pangu (이방우; 李芳雨), was a nobleman during the late Goryeo dynasty who become a prince of Joseon as the first son of King Taejo and Queen Sinui.

== Biography ==
He became the general secretary of the last king of Goryeo dynasty. In year 1388, his father, Yi Sŏnggye, overthrew the Goryeo dynasty. After witnessing this incident, he went to Bogae mountain in Cheorwon to retire. Later on, he went to live at Hamheung, which is located in present-day North Korea; there, he died at the age of 40 in 1394.

In 1392, when his father established the Joseon Dynasty and was giving out royal titles, his first son became as known as Grand Prince Chinan.

In the annals of Joseon dynasty, it describes Grand Prince Chinan as a man who liked alcoholic beverages, and states that he drank copious amount until he died. However, according to a memorial stone of Grand Prince Chinan, which was made in 1789, "Grand Prince Chinan was an exemplary son to his parent, who took good care of his brothers and sisters. When he grew older, he minded in literature and practiced humble life style and did not fancy wealth nor authority."

== Family ==
- Father: King Taejo (4 November 1335 – 27 June 1408)
- Mother: Queen Sinŭi of the Cheongju Han clan (6 October 1337 – 25 November 1391)

Consorts and their respective issue(s):

1. Grand Lady Samhan'guk of the Chungju Ji clan (삼한국대부인 충주 지씨; 1354–?); eldest daughter of Chi Yun (지윤; 池奫; 1302–1377)
  - First son (1383)
  - Yi Pokkŭn, Prince Pongnyŏng (봉녕군 이복근; 1390 – 3 November 1421), second son
    - Daughter-in-law: Lady Yang (양씨; 1403–?); daughter of Yang Won-gae (양원개; 1380–?)
  - Princess Kyŏnghye (경혜옹주; 1390–?), first daughter (Note: Was later given a second Royal title, Princess Hansan (한산군주) then a third, Princess Yŏngdong (영동현주) by King Sejong)
    - Son-in-law: Yi Sungmyo of the Hansan Yi clan (지돈녕부사 이숙묘 한산 이씨; 1 October 1386 — 16 June 1439)
1. Lady Wang of the Haeju Wang clan (해주 왕씨; 1365–?)
  - Yi Tŏkkŭn, Prince Sunnyŏng (순녕군 이덕근; ?–25 April 1412), third son
    - Daughter-in-law: Lady Wang of the Kaeseong Wang clan (개성 왕씨) (Note: Was the granddaughter of U of Goryeo through his second son, Wang Kwan (왕관; 王琯; 1371–1398))
  - Princess Yi of the Jeonju Yi clan (옹주 이씨), second daughter
    - Son-in-law: An Chongnyŏm of the Sunheung An clan (첨지돈녕부사 안종렴 순흥 안씨)
  - Princess Yi of the Jeonju Yi clan (옹주 이씨), third daughter

== In popular culture ==
- Portrayed by Tae Min-yeong in the 1983 KBS TV series Foundation of the Kingdom.
- Portrayed by Jeon In-taek in the 1983 MBC TV series The King of Chudong Palace.
- Portrayed by Im Jeong-ha in the 1996–1998 KBS TV series Tears of the Dragon.
- Portrayed by Jeong Chan-hu in the 2012–2013 SBS TV series The Great Seer.
- Portrayed by Kang In-ki in the 2014 KBS1 TV series Jeong Do-jeon.
- Portrayed by Lee Seung-hyo in the 2015–2016 SBS TV series Six Flying Dragons.
