= Jeongjong of Joseon =

King of Joseon from 1398 to 1400

Jeongjong

King Emeritus of Joseon (Note: After Sejong acceded to the throne in 1418, Jeongjong was known as "The Old King Emeritus" (노상왕; 老上王; Nosangwang) to distinguish him from his younger brother Taejong, who had also abdicated.)
- Tenure: 7 December 1400 – 24 October 1419
- Predecessor: None
- Successor: Taejong

King of Joseon
- Reign: 22 October 1398 – 7 December 1400
- Enthronement: Geunjeongjeon, Gyeongbokgung
- Predecessor: Taejo
- Successor: Taejong

Crown Prince of Joseon
- Tenure: 6 – 22 October 1398
- Predecessor: Crown Prince Bang-seok
- Successor: Crown Prince Bang-won
- Born: Yi Bang-gwa (이방과; 李芳果); 26 July 1357; Hamhung Royal Villa, Dongbuk-myeon, Goryeo
- Died: 24 October 1419 (aged 62); Indeokgung, (Note: Korean: 인덕궁; Hanja: 仁德宮; approximately located between Sajikdan and Gyeonghuigung (possibly within its grounds), it was Jeongjong's residence after his abdication.) Hanseong, Joseon
- Burial: Hurung, Kaesong, North Korea
- Spouse: Queen Jeongan (died 1412)
- Issue Detail: 15 sons, 8 daughters
Names
- Yi Gyeong (이경; 李曔)
Era dates
- Adopted the era name of the Ming dynasty (Note: Hongmu (Hongwu) (홍무; 洪武): 1398 Geonmun (Jianwen) (건문; 建文): 1399–1400)
Regnal name
- Inmun Gongye (인문공예; 仁文恭睿) (Note: Conferred after becoming king emeritus.) (Note: Known as honorific name (존호; 尊號) in the Sinosphere, its closest equivalent in the English-speaking world is the regnal name.)
Posthumous name
- Joseon: Great King Gongjeong Uimun Jangmu Onin Sunhyo (공정의문장무온인순효대왕; 恭靖懿文莊武溫仁順孝大王); Ming dynasty: Gongjeong (공정; 恭靖)
Temple name
- Jeongjong (정종; 定宗)
- Clan: Jeonju Yi
- Dynasty: Yi
- Father: King Taejo
- Mother: Queen Sinui
- Religion: Buddhism → Confucianism (Neo-Confucianism)
- Military career
- Allegiance: Goryeo; Joseon
- Years of service: 1376–1398
- Rank: Commander of the Central Army
- Commands: The Three Military Divisions (Taejo's Guard Corps); The Three Military Divisions; The Central Army
- Conflicts: Waegu subjugation; Jirisan, Jeolla Province (1377); Haeju, Hwanghae Province (1389); Dogosan, Yeongju, Yanggwang Province (1390); Munhwa County, Hwanghae Province (1393); Yeongnyeong County, Pyeongan Province (1393)

- Korean name
- Hangul: 정종
- Hanja: 定宗
- Lit.: "Stabilizing Ancestor"
- RR: Jeongjong
- MR: Chŏngjong

Royal title
- Hangul: 영안군
- Hanja: 永安君
- RR: Yeongangun
- MR: Yŏngan'gun

Courtesy name
- Hangul: 광원
- Hanja: 光遠
- RR: Gwangwon
- MR: Kwangwŏn

Jeongjong (Korean: 정종; Hanja: 定宗; 26 July 1357 – 24 October 1419), (Note: In the Korean calendar (lunisolar), he was born on the 11th day of the 7th lunar month and died on the 26th day of the 9th lunar month.) personal name Yi Bang-gwa, later changed to Yi Gyeong, was the second monarch of Joseon. He was the second son of King Taejo, the founder of the dynasty.

== Biography ==
Born in 1357 as the second son of Yi Seong-gye (posthumously King Taejo) and his first wife Lady Han, he was a prudent, generous, and able military officer. During the latter days of the declining Goryeo, Jeongjong followed his father to various battlefronts and fought at his side. When his father took the throne in 1392, he became a prince.

Taejo had two wives — the first one, who gave birth to six sons (including Jeongjong), died before he was crowned; the second wife was Lady Kang, with whom he had two sons. The king favored his youngest son, whose mother was Lady Kang. Chŏng Tojŏn also backed him as successor, causing much resentment in the other princes.

In 1398, Taejo's fifth son, Yi Bang-won (posthumously King Taejong) led a coup along with many military officers and killed his two younger half-brothers, Chŏng Tojŏn, and many of his faction. Yi Bang-won first tried to show that he was not interested in the throne, so he gave a push to Yi Bang-gwa (who was the eldest son by then), to be the next crown prince. King Taejo was upset and abdicated in disgust, and Yi Bang-gwa became Joseon's second ruler. The same year he moved the government back to Gaegyeong, the old Goryeo capital.

In 1400, a conflict broke out between Yi Bang-won and his elder brother, Yi Bang-gan. Yi Bang-won's force attacked and defeated that of his brother Yi Bang-gan's, who was then sent into exile along with his family. General Park Bo, who persuaded Yi Bang-gan into rebellion, was executed. King Jeongjong, knowing that he was a mere political figurehead for his younger brother, appointed him as crown prince and abdicated months later.

He was an able and wise administrator despite his short reign being marked by bloodshed within the royal family.

Jeongjong died in 1419 and was buried alongside his wife, Queen Jeongan, at Hurung (후릉), in present-day Panmun Ward, Kaesong, North Korea.

== Family ==
- Father: King Taejo (태조대왕; 4 November 1335 – 27 June 1408)
  - Grandfather: Yi Ja-chun (이자춘), King Hwanjo (환조대왕; 20 January 1315 – 3 May 1360)
  - Grandmother: Queen Uihye (의혜왕후), of the Yeongheung Choe clan (영흥 최씨; ?–1336)
- Mother: Queen Sinui (신의왕후), of the Cheongju Han clan (청주 한씨; 6 October 1337 – 25 November 1391)
  - Grandfather: Han Gyeong (한경), Internal Prince Ancheon (안천부원군)
  - Grandmother: Grand Princess Consort of Samhan State (삼한국대부인), of the Saknyeong Shin clan (삭녕 신씨)
- Stepmother: Queen Sindeok (신덕왕후), of the Goksan Kang clan (곡산 강씨; 20 July 1356 – 23 September 1396)

Consort(s) and their respective issue

- Queen Jeongan (정안왕후), of the Gyeongju Kim clan (경주 김씨; 30 January 1355 – 11 August 1412)
- Concubine Seong (성빈), of the Chungju Ji clan (충주 지씨)
  - Yi Hu-saeng (이후생), Prince Deokcheon (덕천군; 1397 – 7 December 1465), 10th son
  - Yi Mal-saeng (이말생), Prince Dopyeong (도평군; 15 September 1402 – ?), 12th son
- Sugui (숙의), of the Chungju Ji clan (충주 지씨)
  - Yi Won-saeng (이원생), Prince Uipyeong (의평군; 1391 – 16 September 1461), first son
  - Yi Mu-saeng (이무생), Prince Seonseong (선성군; 18 December 1392 – 2 August 1460), fourth son
  - Yi Ho-saeng (이호생), Prince Imseong (임성군), 11th son
  - Princess Hamyang (함양옹주), first daughter
- Sugui (숙의), of the Haengju Ki clan (행주 기씨; ? – 13 July 1457)
  - Yi Gun-saeng (이군생), Prince Sunpyeong (순평군; 1392 – 29 September 1456), second son
  - Yi Ui-saeng (이의생), Prince Geumpyeong (금평군; ? – 1 December 1435), third son
  - Yi Yung-saeng (이융생), Prince Jeongseok (정석군; 1409 – 18 November 1464), 14th son
  - Yi Seon-saeng (이선생), Prince Murim (무림군; 1419 – 3 April 1475), 15th son
  - Princess Sukshin (숙신옹주), second daughter
  - Princess Sangwon (상원옹주), fifth daughter
- Sugui (숙의), of the Nampyeong Mun clan (남평 문씨)
  - Yi Gwi-saeng (이귀생), Prince Jongui (종의군; 1393 – 4 June 1451), fifth son
- Sugui (숙의), of the Haepyeong Yun clan (해평 윤씨; 14 January 1368 – 1 October 1417)
  - Yi Deok-saeng (이덕생), Prince Sudo (수도군; 4 April 1393 – 7 August 1449), seventh son
  - Yi Nok-saeng (이녹생), Prince Imeon (임언군; 1399 – 20 September 1450), eighth son
  - Yi Bok-saeng (이복생), Prince Seokbo (석보군), ninth son
  - Yi Bo-saeng (이보생), Prince Jangcheon (장천군; 1418 – 19 April 1465), 13th son
  - Princess Incheon (인천옹주), seventh daughter
- Sugui (숙의), of the Pyeongchang Yi clan (평창 이씨; ? – 1443)
  - Yi Jong-saeng (이종생), Prince Jinnam (진남군; 11 February 1393 – 28 December 1470), sixth son
- Mistress Gauigung (가의궁주), of the Yu clan (유씨)
  - Yi Bul-no (이불노; 1388–1410), unacknowledged son
- Unknown
  - Princess Deokcheon (덕천옹주), third daughter
  - Princess Goseong (고성옹주), fourth daughter
  - Princess Jeonsan (전산옹주), sixth daughter
  - Princess Haman (함안옹주), eighth daughter

== Ancestry ==
Ancestors of Jeongjong of Joseon

Yi Haeng-ni, King Ikjo (익조대왕 이행리)
Yi Chun, King Dojo (도조대왕 이춘)
Queen Jeongsuk, of the Yeongheung Choe clan (정숙왕후 영흥 최씨)
Yi Ja-chun, King Hwanjo (환조대왕 이자춘)
Park Gwang, Internal Prince Anbyeon (안변부원군 박광)
Queen Gyeongsun, of the Munju Park clan (경순왕후 문주 박씨)
King Taejo (태조대왕)
Choe Jong-dae, Count Yeongheung (영흥백 최종대)
Choe Han-gi, Internal Prince Yeongheung (영흥부원군 최한기)
Grand Princess Consort of Joseon State, of the Kim clan (조선국대부인 김씨)
Queen Uihye, of the Yeongheung Choe clan (의혜왕후 영흥 최씨)
Grand Princess Consort of Joseon State, of the Yi clan (조선국대부인 이씨)
King Jeongjong
Han Yu (한유)
Han Gyu-in (한규인)
Han Gyeong, Internal Prince Ancheon (안천부원군 한경)
Queen Sinui, of the Cheongju Han clan (신의왕후 청주 한씨)
Shin Yun-ryeo (신윤려)
Grand Princess Consort of Samhan State, of the Saknyeong Shin clan (삼한국대부인 삭녕 신씨)

== In popular culture ==
- Portrayed by Nam Seong-sik in the 1983 KBS1 TV series Foundation of the Kingdom.
- Portrayed by Lee Young-ho in the 1983 MBC TV series The King of Chudong Palace.
- Portrayed by Tae Min-young in the 1996–1998 KBS1 TV series Tears of the Dragon.
- Portrayed by No Young-gook in the 2008 KBS TV series The Great King, Sejong.
- Portrayed by Oh Hee-joon in the 2012–2013 SBS TV series The Great Seer.
- Portrayed by Lee Tae-rim in the 2014 KBS1 TV series Jeong Do-jeon.
- Portrayed by Seo Dong-won in the 2015–2016 SBS TV series Six Flying Dragons.
- Portrayed by Kim Myung-soo in the 2021 KBS1 TV series The King of Tears, Lee Bang-won.

== See also ==
- History of Korea
- List of monarchs of Korea
- Styles and titles in Joseon

== Notes ==
Jeongjong of Joseon House of Yi Born: 26 July 1357 Died: 24 October 1419
Royal titles
Preceded by Taejo	King of Joseon; 22 October 1398 – 7 December 1400	Succeeded by Taejong
