= Taejo of Joseon =

King of Joseon from 1392 to 1398

Taejo
- Emperor of Korea (posthumously)
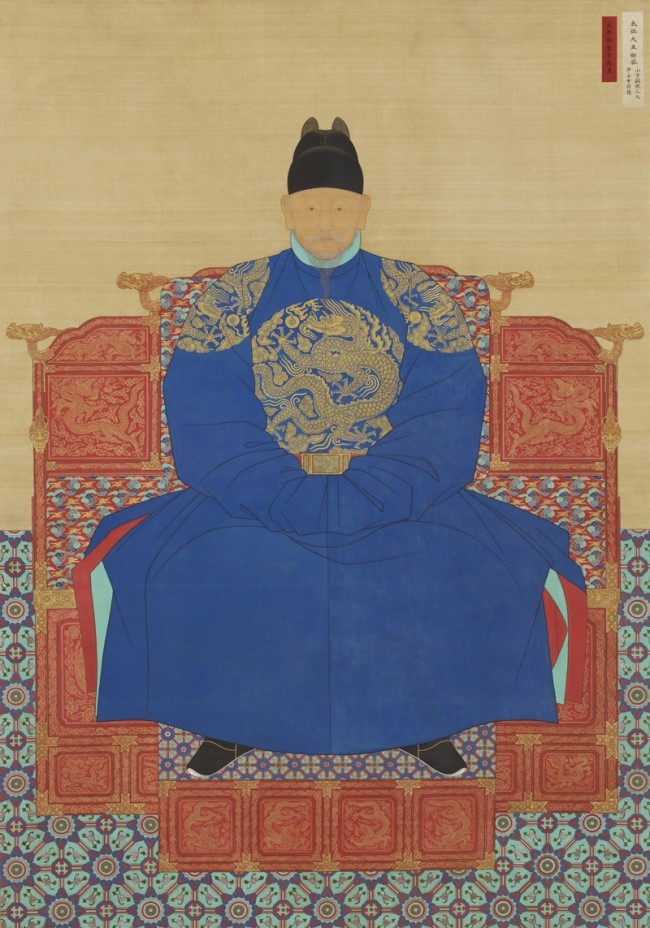
- Reproduction of a state portrait, c. 1827

Grand King Emeritus of Joseon
- Tenure: 22 October 1398 – 27 June 1408
- Predecessor: None
- Successor: Taejong

King of Joseon
- Reign: 13 August 1392 – 22 October 1398
- Enthronement: Main Hall, Suchanggung (Note: Korean: 수창궁; Hanja: 壽昌宮; located in present-day Kaesong, it was the principal palace of Goryeo.)
- Predecessor: Dynasty established (Gongyang as King of Goryeo)
- Successor: Jeongjong
- Born: Yi Sŏnggye (이성계; 李成桂); 4 November 1335; Ssangsŏng Prefecture, Yuan Empire
- Died: 27 June 1408 (aged 72); Gwangyeonru, Changdeokgung, Hansŏng, Joseon
- Burial: Geonwolleung, Donggureung Cluster, Guri, South Korea
- Spouses: Queen Sinŭi (m. 1351; died 1391) Queen Sindeok (died 1396)
- Issue Detail: Jeongjong of Joseon; Taejong of Joseon
Names
- Yi Tan (이단; 李旦)
Era dates
- Adopted the era name of the Ming dynasty (Note: Hongmu (Hongwu) (홍무; 洪武): 1392–1398)
Regnal name
- Chiin Kyeŭn Ŭngch'ŏn Ch'ot'ong Kwang'hun Yŏngmyŏng (지인계운응천조통광훈영명; 至仁啓運應天肇統光勳永命) (Note: Known as honorific name (존호; 尊號) in the Sinosphere, its closest equivalent in the English-speaking world is the regnal name.)
Posthumous name
- Joseon: Great King Kanghŏn Sŏngmun Sinmu Chŏngŭi Kwangdŏk (강헌성문신무정의광덕대왕; 康獻聖文神武正義光德大王); Korean Empire: Emperor Sŏngmun Sinmu Chŏngŭi Kwangdŏk Ko (성문신무정의광덕고황제; 聖文神武正義光德高皇帝) (Note: The posthumous name bestowed by China was notably omitted as a sign of the country's "independence".); Ming dynasty: Kanghŏn (강헌; 康獻)
Temple name
- Taejo (태조; 太祖)
- Clan: Jeonju Yi
- Dynasty: Yi
- Father: Yi Chach'un
- Mother: Lady Ch'oe
- Religion: Buddhism → Confucianism (Neo-Confucianism)
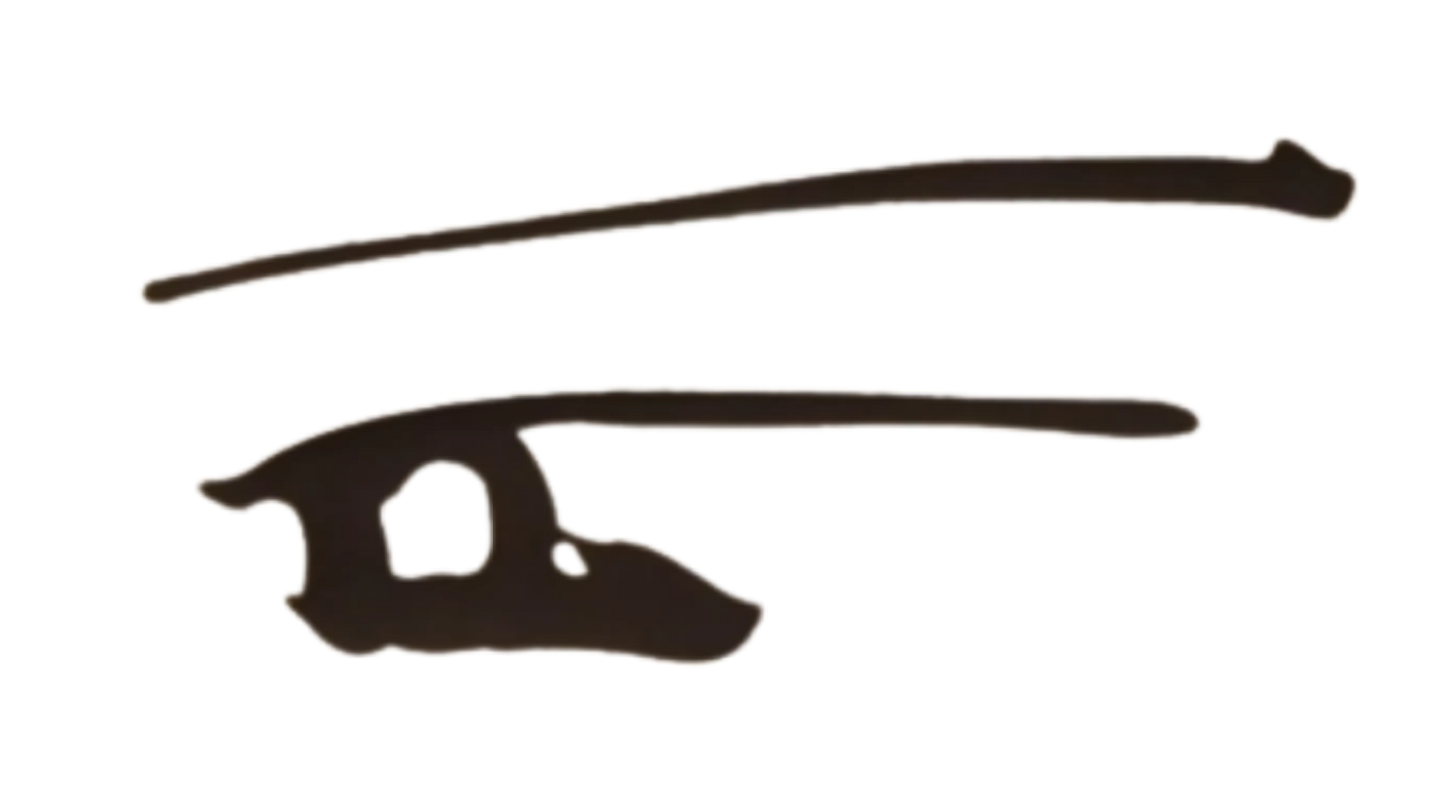
- Signature
- Military career
- Allegiance: Goryeo
- Years of service: 1360 (Note: The official start of his military career; he had previously participated in the 1356 Recapture of Ssangseong, alongside his father.)–1392
- Rank: Commander-in-Chief of the Three Armies
- Conflicts: Recapture of Ssangseong (1356); Second Red Turban invasion (1361); Naghachu's invasion (1362); Yuan invasion under Empress Gi (1364); Rebellion of Kim Samsŏn and Kim Samgae (1364); Recapture of Dongnyeong (1370); Waegu subjugation; Gaegyeong (1377); Jirisan (1377); Hwangsan (1380); Gilju (1384); Hobaldo's invasion (1383); Invasion of Liaodong (1388)

- Korean name
- Hangul: 태조
- Hanja: 太祖
- Lit.: "Great Progenitor"
- RR: Taejo
- MR: T'aejo

Art name
- Hangul: 송헌, 송헌거사
- Hanja: 松軒, 松軒居士
- RR: Songheon, Songheongeosa
- MR: Songhŏn, Songhŏn'gŏsa

Courtesy name
- Hangul: 중결, 군진
- Hanja: 仲潔, 君晋
- RR: Junggyeol, Gunjin
- MR: Chunggyŏl, Kunjin

Taejo (Korean: 태조; Hanja: 太祖; 4 November 1335 – 27 June 1408), (Note: In the Korean calendar (lunisolar), he was born on the 11th day of the 10th lunar month and died on the 24th day of the 5th lunar month.) personal name Yi Sŏnggye, later changed to Yi Tan, was the founder and first monarch of Joseon. He ascended to the throne in 1392 after overthrowing the Goryeo regime, but abdicated just six years later during a strife between his sons. Following the establishment of the Korean Empire, he was honored as Emperor Ko.

Taejo emphasized continuity over change. No new institutions were created, and no massive purges occurred during his reign. His new dynasty was largely dominated by the same ruling families and officials that had served the previous regime. He re-established amicable ties with Japan and improved relations with Ming China.

== Biography ==
=== Early life ===
The future King Taejo was born in Ssangseong Prefecture on the frontiers of the Yuan dynasty. Taejo's father was Yi Chach'un, an official of Korean ethnicity serving the Mongol-led Yuan. His mother, Lady Ch'oe, came from a family originally from Deungju (present-day Anbyŏn County, North Korea). In 1356, the Yi family defected to Goryeo, helping Goryeo seize control of Ssangseong Prefecture from its governor, Cho So-saeng.

=== Historical context ===
By the late 14th century, the 400-year-old Goryeo established by Wang Kŏn in 918 was tottering, its foundations collapsing from years of war and de facto occupation by the disintegrating Mongol Empire. The legitimacy of the royal family itself was also becoming an increasingly disputed issue within the court. The ruling house not only failed to govern the nation effectively but was also affected by rivalry among its various branches and by generations of forced intermarriage with members of the Yuan imperial family. King U's biological mother being a known slave led to rumors contesting his descent from King Gongmin.

Influential aristocrats, generals, and ministers struggled for royal favor and vied for domination of the court, resulting in deep divisions between various factions. With the ever-increasing number of raids against Goryeo conducted by Japanese pirates and the Red Turbans, those who came to dominate the royal court were the reform-minded Sinjin faction of the scholar-officials and the opposing Gwonmun faction of the old aristocratic families as well as generals who could actually fight off the foreign threats — namely Yi Sŏnggye and his rival Ch'oe Yŏng. As the Ming dynasty started to emerge, the Yuan forces became more vulnerable, and Goryeo regained its full independence by the mid-1350s although Yuan remnants effectively occupied northeastern territories with large garrisons of troops.

=== Military career ===
Yi Sŏnggye started his career as a military officer in 1360 and would eventually rise up the ranks. In October 1361, he killed Pak Ŭi who rebelled against the government. In the same year when the Red Turbans had invaded and seized Gaegyeong (present-day Kaesŏng), he helped recapture the capital city with 3,000 men. In 1362, General Naghachu invaded Goryeo and Yi Sŏnggye defeated him after being appointed as commander.

General Yi had gained prestige during the late 1370s and early 1380s by pushing Mongol remnants off the peninsula and also by repelling the well-organized Japanese pirates in a series of successful engagements. In the wake of the rise of the Ming dynasty under Zhu Yuanzhang (the Hongwu Emperor), the royal court in Goryeo split into two competing factions: the camp led by General Yi (supporting the Ming) and the one led by General Choe (supporting the Yuan).

When a Ming messenger came to Goryeo in 1388 to demand the return of a significant portion of Goryeo's northern territory, Ch'oe Yŏng seized the opportunity and played upon the prevailing anti-Ming atmosphere to argue for the invasion of the Liaodong Peninsula. Goryeo claimed to be the successor of the ancient Korean state of Goguryeo; as such, reclaiming Manchuria as part of Korean territory was a tenet of its foreign policy throughout its history.

A staunchly opposed Yi Sŏnggye was chosen to lead the invasion; however, at Wihwa Island on the Amnok River, he made a momentous decision known as the Wihwado Retreat (위화도 회군; 威化島 回軍; lit. ''Turning back the army from Wihwa Island'') which would alter the course of Korean history. Aware of the support he enjoyed from both high-ranking officials and the general populace, he decided to revolt and return to Gaegyeong to secure control of the government.

=== Revolt ===
General Yi led his army from the Amnok River straight into the capital, defeated forces loyal to the royal family (led by General Ch'oe whom he proceeded to eliminate), and forcibly dethroned King U in a de facto coup d'état but did not ascend to the throne himself. Instead, he placed on the throne King U's eight-year-old son, Wang Ch'ang, and following a failed attempt to restore the former king to the throne, had both U and his son put to death. Yi Sŏnggye, now the undisputed power behind the throne, soon forcibly had a distant royal relative named Wang Yo (posthumously King Gongyang) crowned as the new ruler, even among opposition from Goryeo loyalists. After indirectly enforcing his grasp on the royal court through the puppet king, he proceeded to ally himself with Sinjin scholar-officials such as Chŏng Tojŏn and Cho Chun.

One of the most widely known events that occurred during this period was in 1392 when one of Yi Sŏnggye's sons, Yi Pang-wŏn, organized a banquet for the renowned scholar and statesman Chŏng Mong-ju who refused to be won over by General Yi despite their assorted correspondence in the form of archaic poems and continued to be a faithful advocate for the old regime. Chŏng Mong-ju was revered throughout Goryeo, even by Yi Pang-wŏn himself, but in the eyes of the supporters of the new dynasty, he was seen as an obstacle which had to be removed. After the banquet, he was killed by five men on the Seonjuk Bridge.

=== Reign ===
In 1392, Yi Sŏnggye forced King Gongyang to abdicate, exiled him to Wonju (where he and his family were secretly executed), and enthroned himself as the new king, thus ending Goryeo's 475 years of rule. In 1393, he changed his dynasty's name to Joseon.

Among his early achievements was the improvement of relations with the Ming; this had its origin in Taejo's refusal to attack their neighbor. Shortly after his accession, he sent envoys to inform the court at Nanjing that a dynastic change had taken place. Envoys were also dispatched to Japan, seeking the re-establishment of amicable connections. The mission was successful, and Ashikaga Yoshimitsu was reported to have been favorably impressed by this embassy. Envoys from the Ryūkyū Kingdom were received in 1392, 1394 and 1397, as well as from Siam in 1393.

In 1394, the new capital was established at Hanseong (present-day Seoul).

When the new dynasty was officially promulgated, the issue of which son would be the heir to the throne was brought up. Although Yi Pang-wŏn, Taejo's fifth son by his first wife Queen Sinui, had contributed the most to his father's rise to power, he harbored a profound hatred against two of Taejo's key allies, Chŏng To-jŏn and Nam Ŭn.

Both sides were fully aware of the mutual animosity and felt constantly threatened. When it became clear that Yi Pang-wŏn was the most worthy successor, Chŏng To-jŏn, who had met and formed a political alliance with Queen Sindeok prior, used his influence to convince the king that the wisest choice would be the son that he loved most, not the son that he felt was best for the kingdom.

In 1392, the eighth son of King Taejo and his second son by Queen Sindeok, Yi Pang-sŏk, was appointed as crown prince. After the sudden death of the queen in 1396 and while Taejo was still in mourning for his wife, Chŏng To-jŏn began conspiring to preemptively kill Yi Pang-wŏn and his brothers to secure his position in the royal court.

Upon hearing of this plan in 1398, Yi Pang-wŏn and his wife, Princess Jeongnyeong, immediately revolted and raided the palace, killing Chŏng To-jŏn, his followers, and the two sons of the late Queen Sindeok. This incident became known as the First Strife of Princes (제1차 왕자의 난). Aghast at the fact that his sons were willing to kill each other for the throne and psychologically exhausted by the death of his second wife, Taejo immediately named his second son, Yi Pang-gwa (posthumously King Jeongjong), as the new successor and abdicated.

Thereafter, Taejo retired to the Hamhung Royal Villa and maintained distance with his fifth son for the rest of his life. Allegedly, Yi Pang-wŏn sent emissaries numerous times and each time the former king executed them to express his firm decision not to meet his son again. This historical anecdote gave birth to the term Hamhung Chasa (함흥차사; 咸興差使) which means a person who never comes back despite several nudges. However, recent studies have found that Taejo did not actually execute any of the emissaries; these people died during revolts which coincidentally occurred in the region.

In 1400, King Jeongjong named Yi Pang-wŏn as heir presumptive and voluntarily abdicated. That same year, Yi Pang-wŏn assumed the throne of Joseon; he is posthumously known as King Taejong.

=== Death ===
King Taejo died ten years after his abdication on 27 June 1408 in Changdeokgung. He was buried at Geonwolleung (건원릉) in the Donggureung Cluster (present-day Guri, South Korea). The tomb of his umbilical cord is located in Geumsan County, South Korea.

== Legacy ==
Although Taejo overthrew Goryeo and expelled officials who remained loyal to the previous dynasty, many regard him as a revolutionary and a decisive ruler who eliminated an inept, obsolete and crippled governing system to save the nation from foreign forces and conflicts.

The resulting safeguarding of domestic security led the Koreans to rebuild and further discover their culture. In the midst of the rival Yuan and Ming dynasties, Joseon encouraged the development of national identity which was once threatened by the Mongols. However, some scholars, particularly in North Korea, view Taejo as a mere traitor to the old regime and bourgeois apostate while paralleling him to General Ch'oe Yŏng, a military elite who conservatively served Goryeo to death.

His diplomatic successes in securing Korea in the early modern period are notable.

== Worship ==
In Korean shamanism, Taejo is worshiped as a wangshin (왕신; 王神; lit. ''king god'').

== Family ==
- Father: Yi Chach'un (이자춘), King Hwanjo (환조대왕; 20 January 1315 – 3 May 1360)
  - Grandfather: Yi Ch'un (이춘), King Dojo (도조대왕; 1278 – 25 August 1342)
  - Grandmother: Queen Kyŏngsun (경순왕후), of the Munju Park clan (문주 박씨; 1286–?)
- Mother: Queen Ŭihye (의혜왕후), of the Yeongheung Ch'oe clan (영흥 최씨; ?–1336)
  - Grandfather: Ch'oe Hangi (최한기), Internal Prince Yŏnghŭng (상산부원군)
  - Grandmother: Grand Princess Consort of Joseon State (조선국대부인), of the Yi clan (이씨)

Consort(s) and their respective issue

- Queen Sinŭi (신의왕후), of the Cheongju Han clan (청주 한씨; 6 October 1337 – 25 November 1391)
  - Yi Pang'u (이방우), Grand Prince Chinan (진안대군; 1354 – 23 January 1394), first son
  - Yi Panggwa (이방과), King Jeongjong (정종대왕; 26 July 1357 – 24 October 1419), second son
  - Yi Pang'ŭi (이방의), Grand Prince Ikan (익안대군; 1360 – 7 November 1404), third son
  - Yi Panggan (이방간), Grand Prince Hoean (회안대군; 7 August 1364 – 10 April 1421), fourth son
  - Yi Pangwŏn (이방원), King Taejong (태종대왕; 21 June 1367 – 8 June 1422), fifth son
  - Yi Pangyŏn (이방연), Grand Prince Deokan (덕안대군; ?–1388), sixth son
  - Princess Kyŏngsin (경신공주; ? – 8 May 1426), second daughter
  - Princess Kyŏngsŏn (경선공주), third daughter
- Queen Sindeok (신덕왕후), of the Goksan Kang clan (곡산 강씨; 20 July 1356 – 23 September 1396)
  - Princess Kyŏngsun (경순공주; ? – 17 September 1407), first daughter
  - Yi Pangbon (이방번), Grand Prince Muan (무안대군; 1381 – 6 October 1398), seventh son
  - Yi Pangsŏk (이방석), Grand Prince Ŭian (의안대군; 1382 – 6 October 1398), eighth son
- Consort Sŏng (성비), of the Wonju Wŏn clan (원주 원씨; ? – 21 January 1450)
- Mistress Chŏnggyŏnggung (정경궁주), of the Goheung Yu clan (고흥 유씨)
- Mistress Hwaŭi (화의옹주), of the Kim clan (김씨; ? – 18 January 1429) (Note: Her courtesan name was Ch'iljŏmsŏn (칠점선; lit. ''Immortal of the Seventh Hour'').)
  - Princess Suksin (숙신옹주; ? – 26 March 1453), given name Myeochi (며치), fifth daughter
- Ch'andŏk (찬덕), (Note: Position of the third rank in the internal court, which was established during King Taejong's reign, but was no longer in use after the system was revised later in the 15th century.) of the Chu clan (주씨)
  - Princess Ŭiryŏng (의령옹주; ? – 24 February 1466), fourth daughter
- Palace Lady (궁인), of the Kim clan (김씨)
- Courtesan Muhyeoba (무협아)

== Ancestry ==
Ancestors of Taejo of Joseon

Yi Ansa, King Mokjo (목조대왕 이안사)
Yi Haengni, King Ikjo (익조대왕 이행리)
Queen Hyogong, of the Pyongchang Yi clan (효공왕후 평창 이씨)
Yi Ch'un, King Dojo (도조대왕 이춘)
Ch'oe Kiyŏl (최기열)
Queen Jeongsuk, of the Yeongheung Ch'oe clan (정숙왕후 영흥 최씨)
Yi Chach'un, King Hwanjo (환조대왕 이자춘)
Park T'ong (박통)
Park Kwang, Internal Prince Anbyŏn (안변부원군 박광)
Queen Kyŏngsun, of the Munju Park clan (경순왕후 문주 박씨)
King Taejo
Ch'oe Ch'ŏnbo, Count Yŏnghŭng (영흥백 최천보)
Ch'oe Chongdae, Count Yŏnghŭng (영흥백 최종대)
Grand Princess Consort of Joseon State, of the Kim clan (조선국대부인 김씨)
Ch'oe Hangi, Internal Prince Yŏnghŭng (영흥부원군 최한기)
Grand Princess Consort of Joseon State, of the Kim clan (조선국대부인 김씨)
Queen Ŭihye, of the Yeongheung Ch'oe clan (의혜왕후 영흥 최씨)
Grand Princess Consort of Joseon State, of the Yi clan (조선국대부인 이씨)

One of the many issues demonstrating the early strained relationship between Joseon and Ming was the debate of Taejo's genealogy which began as early as 1394 and became a source of diplomatic friction that lasted over 200 years. The Collected Regulations of the Great Ming erroneously recorded 'Yi Tan' (Taejo's personal name) as the son of Yi Inim and that Yi Tan killed the last four kings of Goryeo. This established Ming's opinion of Taejo as an usurper first and foremost from the time of the Hongwu Emperor when he repeatedly refused to acknowledge Taejo as the new sovereign of the Korean Peninsula. The first mention of this error was in 1518 (about 9 years after the publication). Those who saw the publication petitioned the Ming for redress including, among others, left chanseong Yi Kyemaeng and minister of rites Nam Kon, who wrote Jonggye Byeonmu (종계변무; 宗系辨誣). It took until 1584 (after many Ming envoys had seen the petitions) through chief scholar Hwang Chŏng'uk that the issue was finally addressed. The Wanli Emperor commissioned a second edition in 1576 (covering the years between 1479 and 1584). About a year after its completion, Yu Hong saw the revision and returned to Joseon with the good news.

== Gallery ==
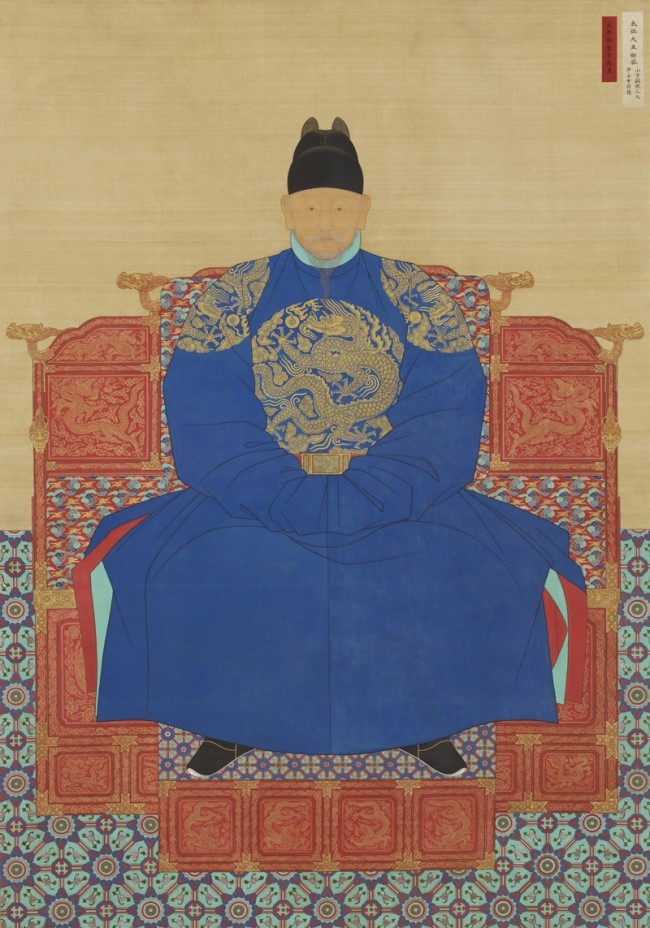
Portrait of King Taejo (1872 copy)

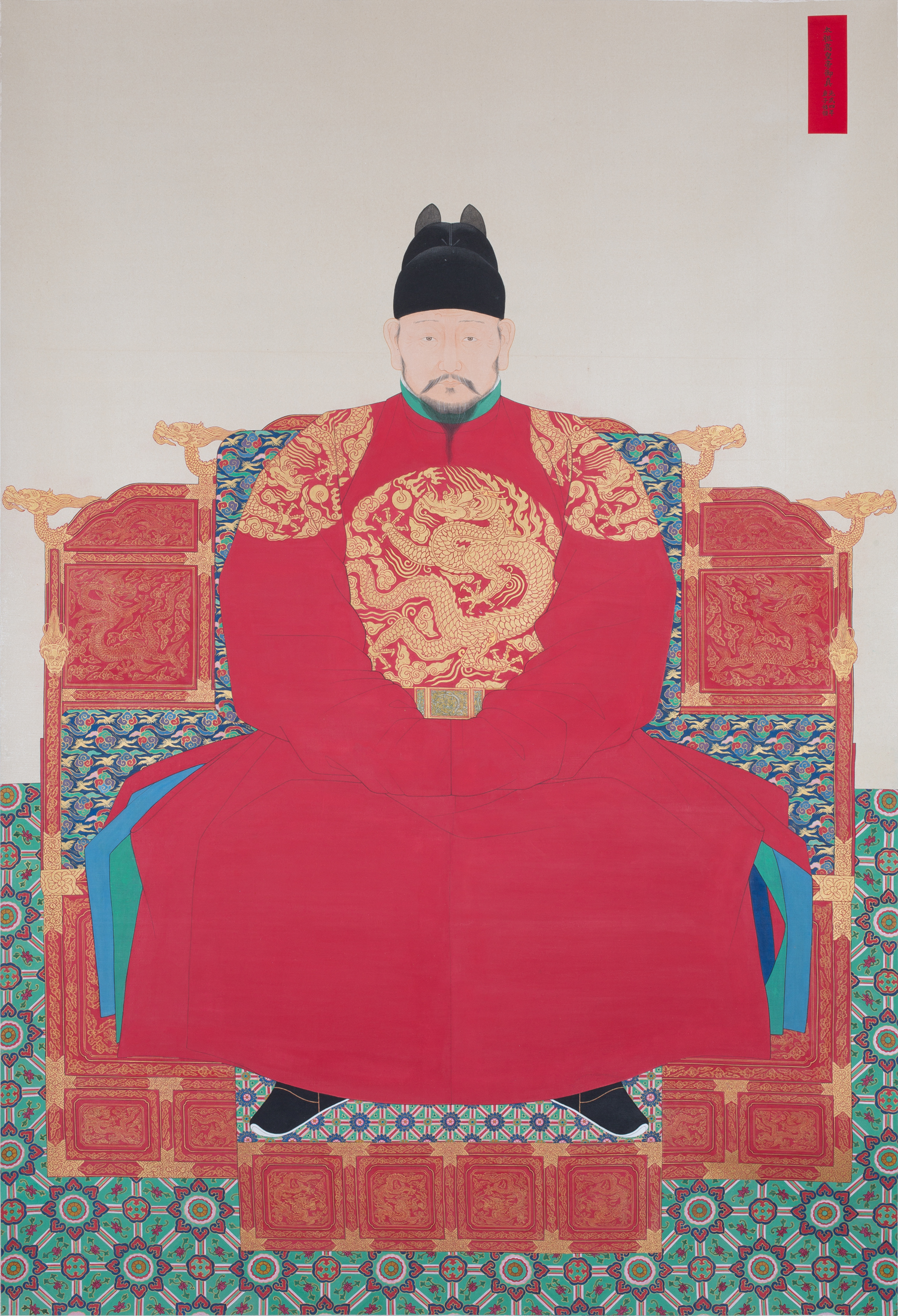
Portrait of Emperor Go (1900 copy)

A contract written by Taejo for his daughter Princess Sukshin (1401)

== In popular culture ==
- Portrayed by Im Dong-jin in the 1983 KBS1 TV series Foundation of the Kingdom.
- Portrayed by Kim Mu-saeng in the 1983 MBC TV series The King of Chudong Palace and in the 1996 KBS1 TV series Tears of the Dragon.
- Portrayed by Lee Jin-woo in the 2005–2006 MBC TV series Shin Don.
- Portrayed by Oh Jae-moo in the 2012 SBS TV series Faith.
- Portrayed by Ji Jin-hee in the 2012–2013 SBS TV series The Great Seer.
- Portrayed by Yoo Dong-geun in the 2014 KBS1 TV series Jeong Do-jeon.
- Portrayed by Lee Dae-yeon in the 2014 film The Pirates.
- Portrayed by Lee Do-kyung in the 2015 JTBC TV series More Than a Maid.
- Portrayed by Son Byong-ho in the 2015 film Empire of Lust.
- Portrayed by Chun Ho-jin in the 2015–2016 SBS TV series Six Flying Dragons.
- Portrayed by Kim Ki-hyeon in the 2016 KBS1 TV series Jang Yeong-sil.
- Portrayed by Lim Jong-yun in the 2016 film Seondal: The Man Who Sells the River.
- Portrayed by Kim Yeong-cheol in the 2019 JTBC TV series My Country: The New Age and 2021 KBS1 TV series The King of Tears, Lee Bang-won.
- Portrayed in the mobile/PC game Rise of Kingdoms.
- Portrayed by Lee Sung-min in the 2025 tvN TV series The Queen Who Crowns.

== See also ==
- House of Yi
- History of Korea
- List of monarchs of Korea
- Styles and titles in Joseon

== Sources ==
=== Veritable Records ===
- Office of Annals (Taejo) [실록청; 實錄廳] (1413) [1392]. 태조가 백관의 추대를 받아 수창궁에서 왕위에 오르다 [Taejo ascends to the throne at Suchang Palace]. 조선왕조실록: 태조실록; 太祖康獻大王實錄 [Veritable Records of the Joseon Dynasty: Annals of King Taejo] (in Korean). Gwacheon [과천]: National Institute of Korean History.
- ——— (1413) [1393]. 국호를 조선으로 정하는 예부의 자문 [Advice to change the name of the country to Joseon]. 조선왕조실록: 태조실록; 太祖康獻大王實錄 [Veritable Records of the Joseon Dynasty: Annals of King Taejo] (in Korean). Gwacheon [과천]: National Institute of Korean History.
- Office of Annals (Taejong) [실록청; 實錄廳] (1431) [1408]. 태상왕의 존시를 지인 계운 성문 신무 대왕으로, 묘호를 태조로 하다 [The temple name of the late king becomes Taejo, and his posthumous name becomes Great King Jiin Gyeun Seongmun Sinmu]. 조선왕조실록: 태종실록; 太宗恭定大王實錄 [Veritable Records of the Joseon Dynasty: Annals of King Taejong] (in Korean). Gwacheon [과천]: National Institute of Korean History.
- ——— (1431) [1408]. 태조에게 '강헌'이라는 시호를 내린다는 황제의 고명 [The Ming emperor grants Taejo the posthumous name 'Gangheon']. 조선왕조실록: 태종실록; 太宗恭定大王實錄 [Veritable Records of the Joseon Dynasty: Annals of King Taejong] (in Korean). Gwacheon [과천]: National Institute of Korean History.

=== Secondary sources ===
- Byonghyon, Choi (2014). The Annals of King T'aejo: Founder of Korea's Chosŏn Dynasty. Cambridge, MA: Harvard University Press. ISBN 978-0-674-28130-1.
- Goodrich, Luther Carrington and Fang, Zhaoying. (1976). Dictionary of Ming biography, 1368–1644 (明代名人傳), Vol. I; Dictionary of Ming biography, 1368–1644 (明代名人傳), Vol. II. New York: Columbia University Press. ISBN 9780231038010; ISBN 9780231038331; OCLC 1622199
- Hussain, Tariq. (2006). Diamond Dilemma: Shaping Korea for the 21st Century. (다이아몬드딜레마). Seoul: Random House. 10-1-430-30641-6/ISBN 978-1-430-30641-2; OCLC 180102797; OCLC 67712109 (in Korean)
- Kang, Jae-eun and Lee, Suzanne. (2006). The Land of Scholars: Two Thousand Years of Korean Confucianism. Paramus, New Jersey: Homa & Sekey Books. ISBN 978-1-931-90737-8; OCLC 60931394
- Titsingh, Isaac, ed. (1834). Nipon o daï itsi ran; Annales des empereurs du Japon. (compiled by Hayashi Gahō in 1652). Paris: Oriental Translation Fund of Great Britain and Ireland. OCLC 251800045 (in French)

Taejo of Joseon House of Yi Born: 4 November 1335 Died: 27 June 1408
Royal titles
New title Dynasty established	King of Joseon; 13 August 1392 – 22 October 1398	Succeeded by Jeongjong
