= Tangible Cultural Property =

Tangible Cultural Property can refer to:

- Tangible Cultural Property (Japan)
- Tangible Cultural Property (South Korea)

== See also ==
- Intangible Cultural Heritage
