= Heritage preservation in South Korea =

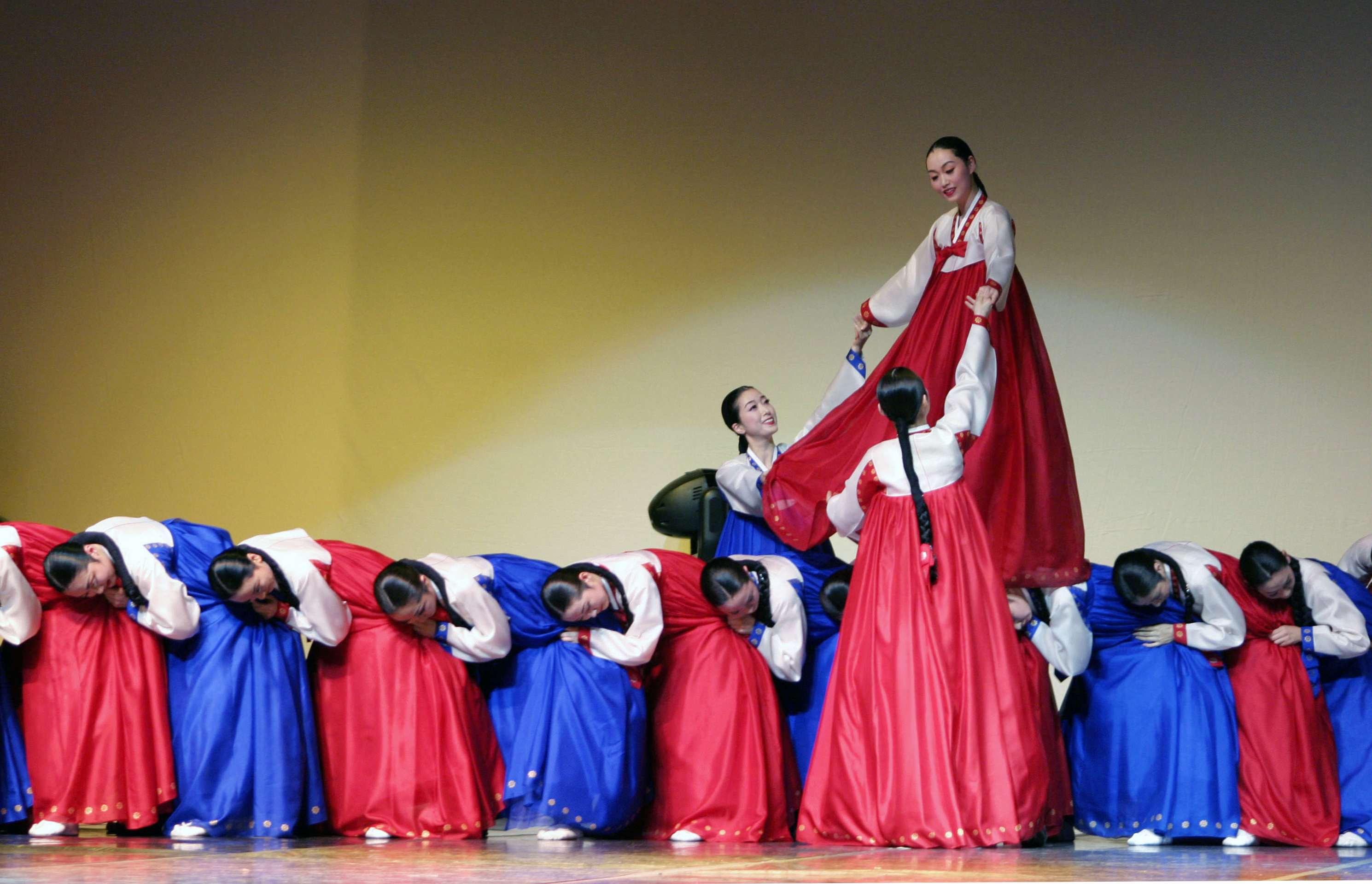
Ganggang sullae, women's dance from South Jeolla Province, Intangible Cultural Heritage #8

The heritage preservation system of South Korea is a multi-level program aiming to preserve and cultivate Korean cultural heritage. The program is administered by the Cultural Heritage Administration (CHA), and the legal framework is provided by the Cultural Heritage Protection Act of 1962, last updated in 2012. The program started in 1962 and has gradually been extended and upgraded since then.

The CHA classifies cultural heritage into five major categories (state-designated heritage, city and province-designated heritage, cultural heritage material, registered cultural heritage, undesignated cultural heritage) and these are divided further into subcategories. Besides tangible cultural heritage, South Korea aims to preserve its intangible cultural heritage as well, including folk customs, music, dance and handicraft. The program also includes Living National Treasures, persons who possess the knowledge and skills important to pass down intangible cultural heritage to new generations. South Korea has founded several educational centers throughout the country and established a university, specifically dedicated to heritage preservation.

Some of the heritage properties of South Korea has been inscribed into various UNESCO lists. As of 2014, the country has nine cultural and one natural World Heritage Sites, with 15 added to the provisional list; and there are 17 items registered as UNESCO intangible cultural heritage.

Although the program is considered successful by both the public and experts, there are unresolved issues regarding the system and particularly the selection method of "living national treasure" holders.

== The Cultural Heritage Administration ==
The program is administered by the Cultural Heritage Administration, the predecessor of which was founded in 1945 by the American military government of Korea. It first belonged to the Ministry of Education, then to the Ministry of Culture. Between 1999 and 2004 it functioned as an independent agency. The CHA administers the National Palace Museum of Korea as well as various 'palace offices' and 'shrine offices'. It is also responsible for the Royal Tombs of the Joseon Dynasty, which are part of the UNESCO World Heritage.

The CHA established Korea National University of Cultural Heritage in 2000, which specifically educates professionals for heritage preservation. Since 1999 the South Korean government founded 27 educational centers for cultivating intangible cultural heritage. The administrator of CHA is Kim Hyeon-mo since 2020. The annual budget of the administration was 615 billion won in 2012.

The legal framework for the heritage program is provided by the Cultural Heritage Protection Act of 1962 (문화재보호법, Munhwajae Bohobeop), last updated in 2012.

== History ==
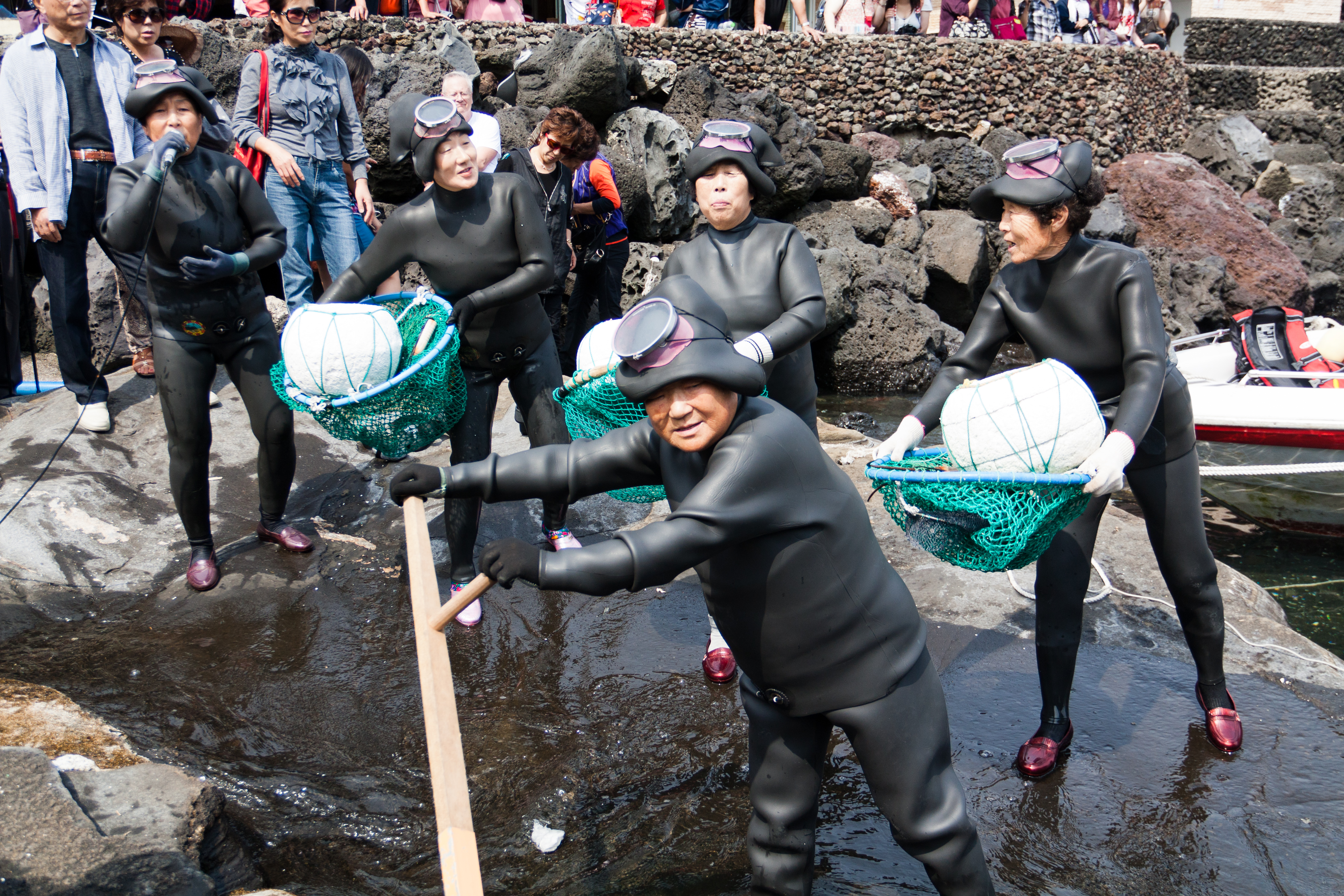
Haenyo, women divers of Jeju Island, diving as deep as 20 meters without oxygen tanks

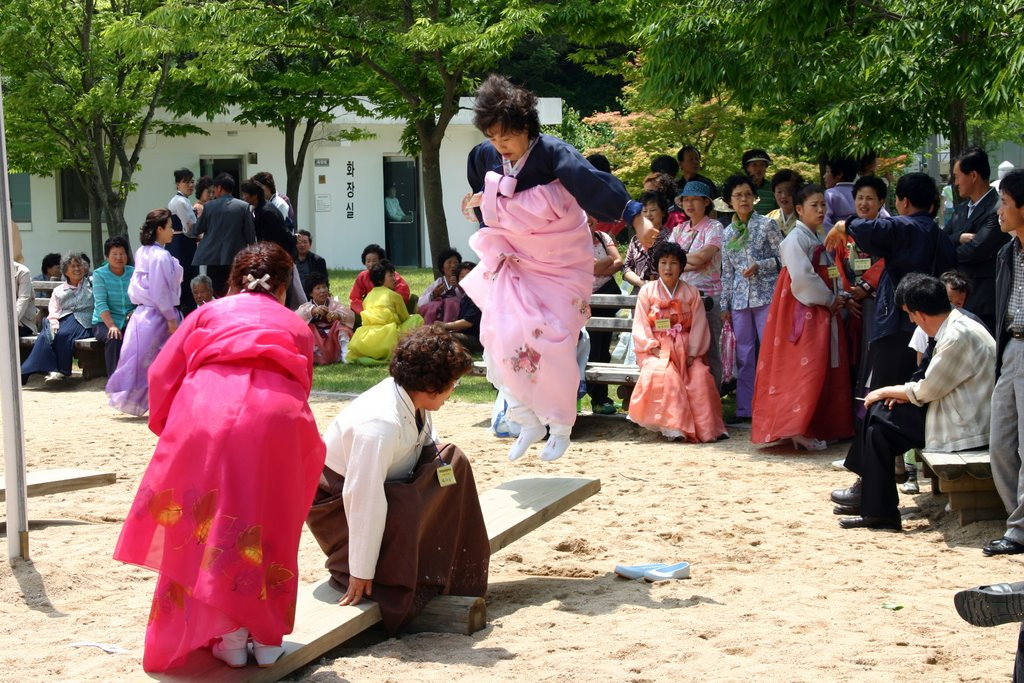
Nolttwigi

The legal framework of cultural heritage preservation is based on the number 961 Law of 1962 (문화재보호법 Munhwajae Bohobeop), which in turn is based on the similar Japanese act of 1950. The Korean act is broader in scope, also extending to folklore. The act was amended in 1970 not only to include people (인간문화재, ingan munhwajae, "human cultural heritage") but also to support them financially.

At the beginning of the program, after the Korean War, the CHA had little means to operate. Go Sangnyeol (고상렬), the administrator of CHA between 1961 and 1968 set out to search for intangible cultural properties on the basis of a series of articles written by Yae Yonghae (예용해) for Hankook Ilbo, as the reporter spent years in exploring the country and interviewing old masters of handicraft. The first items to be inscribed on the intangible heritage list were thus taken from Yae's articles. Others were added based on the opinions of researchers and also included winners of the annual folk tradition competitions. The recommendation of local administrations was also sought.

Korea introduced a unique system in the 1970s to preserve folk traditions (including handicraft, arts, folk songs, folk dances, theatre, traditional food preparation techniques, etc.). This was triggered by a movement called New Community, aiming to modernize life in the countryside. In an attempt to get rid of old superstitions, the movement advocated cutting down the old Zelkova trees often found at village entrances, as they were believed to be 'protectors' of the village according to tradition. In 1971, the songs of the haenyo, or "sea women" of Jeju Island were declared provincial intangible cultural properties.

Major stakeholders of the intangible heritage program are "living national treasures" or officially called "holders" (보유자 boyuja), people who possess knowledge or skills essential for preserving Korean culture. Some of these 'holders' obtained significant national exposure or fame, for example Han Bongnyeo (한복려), a holder for the Korean royal court cuisine who supervises the authentic presentation of Joseon Dynasty food in historical movies and television series.

The UNESCO Convention for the Safeguarding of the Intangible Cultural Heritage took place in 2003 and South Korea joined the program a year later. In 2005 China declared some 1200 properties as intangible cultural heritage, with 16 items belonging to the Korean minority of the country, including the traditional wedding ceremony, Arirang (a folk song) and nolttwigi (a traditional seesaw game). The CHA decided that they also had to broaden the scope of intangible heritage to properties that do not have any designated 'holders', like kimchi, hangul or Goryeo ginseng.

The CHA opened its World Intangible Heritage Complex in Jeonju, which also functions as a national centre. The complex has an area of 59,930 square metres (645,100 sq ft) and was constructed from US$66 million.

In 2017, the CHA decided to widen the range of possible cultural assets, including objects younger than 50 years. Thus items like Yuna Kim's skates she wore at the 2010 Winter Olympics and the first train operated by the Seoul Metropolitan Subway in 1974 are also designated as cultural assets.

== Classification ==
As of July 2013, South Korea has 411 active National Treasures, 2317 Treasures, 485 Historic Sites, 104 Scenic Sites. It also classified 459 Natural Monuments, 134 Intangible Cultural Heritage items, 1062 Folklore Cultural Heritage properties and 549 Cultural Heritage of Early Modern Times. In 2012 there were 180 active Living National Treasures, out of 570 registered, the rest mainly retired.

=== State-designated heritage (국가지정문화재) ===
Classification	Description	Example	Image
National Treasure (국보)	Important tangible cultural heritage, valuable not only for Korea but also for humankind, including historical structures, ancient books and documents, paintings, sculptures, handicraft, archaeological findings and armory.	Namdaemun; National Treasure #1	
Treasure (보물)	Important tangible cultural heritage, including historical structures, ancient books and documents, paintings, sculptures, handicraft, archaeological findings and armory.	Standing stone Buddhas of Paju; Treasure #93	
Historic Site (사적)	Sites of outstanding historical or academic value, for example, pre-historic sites, fortresses, tombs, kilns, dolmens, temple sites.	Hwaseong Fortress; Historic Site #3	
Scenic Site (명승)	Natural scenic sites that are of outstanding historical, artistic or landscape value, and are unique or rare due to their natural formation.	Jeongbang Waterfall on Jeju Island; Scenic Site #43	
Natural Monument (천연기념물)	Animals, plants, minerals, caves, geological features, biological products and natural phenomena of outstanding historical, cultural, academic or aesthetic value.	Lacebark pine at Jogyesa temple in Seoul; Natural Monument #9	
National Intangible Cultural Heritage (국가무형문화재)	Intangible cultural heritage of outstanding historical, artistic or academic value, such as theatre, music, dance and handicraft. Holders of these Important Intangible Cultural Properties are Living National Treasures.	Taepyeongmu, a type of court dance; Intangible Cultural Heritage #92	
National Folklore Cultural Heritage (국가민속문화재)	Devices, clothing and buildings essential for everyday life, commerce, transport, entertainment, public events, religious and other festivals, to understand the change in lifestyle over the centuries.	Breastplate of Prince Heungseon; Folklore Cultural Property #65	

=== City- or province-designated heritage (시·도지정문화재) ===
Classification	Description	Example	Image
Tangible Cultural Heritage (유형문화재)	Building, classical records, books, documents, paintings, sculptures, handicraft, archaeological findings.	Seoul Anglican Cathedral, Seoul tangible cultural heritage #35	
Intangible Cultural Heritage (무형문화재)	Theatre, music, dance, handicraft	Somokjang (소목장), furniture carpentry, designated by multiple cities and provinces	
Monument (기념물)	Shell mounds, ancient tombs, fortresses, palace sites, relic sites, animals (including habitats and breeding places), plants (including habitats), minerals and caves.	Nakseongdae Park (낙성대), Seoul	
Folklore Heritage (민속문화재)	Devices, clothing and buildings essential for everyday life, commerce, transport, entertainment, public events, religious and other festivals.	House of Han Kyuseol aristocrat in Seoul (장교동 한규설 가옥)	

=== Other classifications ===
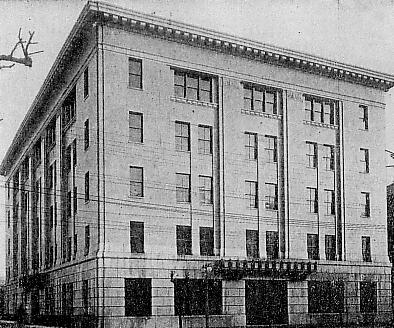
The Korea Electric Power Corporation headquarters, registered cultural heritage

==== Cultural Heritage Material (문화재자료) ====
Cultural heritage rendered important from a regional point of view but not classified by cities or provinces.

==== Registered Cultural Heritage (등록문화재) ====
Contains a variety of things, mostly buildings, primarily from the late 19th century to the 1940s. It can also contain non-building and more recent things that are in need of preservation due to their condition.

==== Undesignated Cultural Heritage (비지정문화재) ====
Classified into two categories:

- General Movable Cultural Heritage, Article 76, Cultural Heritage Protection Act: ancient books, documents, wood blocks, sculptures, paintings, handicraft, archaeological findings that have not been classified by the state or a city/province but in need of protection for their historical and artistic values and the export of which are forbidden.
- Buried Cultural Heritage, Article 43, Cultural Heritage Protection Act: properties buried under ground or in the sea.

== UNESCO heritage ==
Relations with UNESCO are coordinated through the Korean National Commission for UNESCO since 1954.

=== World Heritage ===
South Korea joined the UNESCO World Heritage program on 14 June 1950. There are nine cultural and one natural world heritage sites in South Korea as of 2013, with 15 additional items on the provisional list. World heritage sites include the Pulguksa temple complex and the Changdeokgung palace, and the provisional list includes sites like the ancient mountain fortresses in Central Korea.

=== Intangible cultural heritage ===
As of 2022, there are 22 South Korean items inscribed as UNESCO intangible cultural heritage:

Year	Name	Hangul	Notes	Image
2008	The Royal Ancestral Ritual in the Jongmyo Shrine and its Music	종묘제례악	Royal ancestral ritual in the Jongmyo shrine and its music	
2008	Pansori	판소리	Korean folk opera	
2008	Gangneung Danoje Festival	강릉단오제	Praying to mountain gods to protect the village	
2009	Yeongsanjae	영산재	A Buddhist rite	
2009	Namsadang Nori	남사당 놀이	Male performance of music, acrobatics and dance	
2009	Jeju Chilmeoridang Yeongdeunggut	제주 칠머리당영등굿	A ritual on Jeju Island when locals pray for a peaceful sea and abundant catch	
2009	Ganggang sullae	강강술래	Female dance from South Jeolla Province	
2009	Cheoyongmu	처용무	Masked dance	
2010	Gagok	가곡	Lyric song cycles accompanied by an orchestra	
2010	Daemokjang	대목장	Traditional wooden architecture	
2011	Weaving of Mosi in Hansan region	한산모시짜기	Weaving of Mosi (fine ramie) in the Hansan region	
2011	Taekkyeon	택견	Martial art	
2011	Jultagi	줄타기	Tightrope walking	
2012	Arirang	아리랑	Folk song	
2013	Gimjang	김장	Kimchi making season	
2014	Pungmul (Nongak)	풍물 (농악)	Farmers' traditional music and dance	
2015	Tugging rituals and games (with other countries)	줄다리기	Tugging rituals and games (with other countries)	
2016	Culture of Jeju Haenyeo (women divers)	해녀	Female divers in the Korean province of Jeju	
2016	Falconry (with other countries)	매 부리기	Falconry, a living human heritage (with other countries)	
2018	Ssireum	씨름	Traditional Korean wrestling	
2020	Yeondeunghoe	연등회	Lantern lighting festival	
2022	Talchum	탈춤	Mask dance drama	

=== Memory of the World ===
As of 2023 there are 18 South Korean items inscribed into the Memory of the World Register:

Year	Name	Hangul	Notes	Image
1997	The Annals of the Choson Dynasty	조선왕조실록	From 1413 to 1865	
1997	The Hunmin Chongum Manuscript	훈민정음	Manuscript on the introduction of Hangul	
2001	Seungjeongwon ilgi	승정원일기	The Diaries of the Royal Secretariat	
2001	Baegun hwasang chorok buljo jikji simche yojeol (vol.II), the second volume of "Anthology of Great Buddhist Priests' Zen Teachings"	불조직지심체요절	the second volume of "Anthology of Great Buddhist Priests’ Zen Teachings" and it is the world's oldest extant book printed with movable metal type	
2007	Printing woodblocks of the Tripitaka Koreana and miscellaneous Buddhist scriptures	팔만 대장경	Printing woodblocks of the Tripitaka Koreana and miscellaneous Buddhist scriptures about resisted for Mongol invasions	
2007	Uigwe	의궤	The Royal Protocols of the Joseon Dynasty	
2009	Donguibogam: Principles and Practice of Eastern Medicine	동의보감	Principles and Practice of Eastern Medicine made by Heo Jun	
2011	May 18 Gwangju Democratization Movement	5·18 광주 민주화 운동	Human Rights Documentary Heritage 1980 Archives for the May 18th Democratic Uprising against Military Regime, in Gwangju	
2011	Ilseongnok	일성록	Records of Daily Reflections for the King	
2013	Nanjung ilgi	난중일기	War Diary of Admiral Yi Sun-sin in Imjin War	
2013	Archives of Saemaul Undong (New Community Movement)	새마을 운동	Archives of the New Community Movement. A movement aiming to modernize rural life in the 1970s	
2015	Confucian Printing Woodblocks in Korea	유교책판	Printing woodblocks of Confucian texts related to How to make the book from Seonbi groups in Neo-Confucianism society of Joseon Dynasty period	
2015	The Archives of the KBS Special Live Broadcast "Finding Dispersed Families"	KBS "이산가족을 찾습니다" 기록물	The Archives of the KBS Special Live Broadcast "Finding Dispersed Families"	
2017	Royal Seal and Investiture Book Collection of the Joseon Dynasty	조선왕실 어보와 어책	Royal Seal and Investiture Book Collection for Symbol of the Royal Family in Korea	
2017	Archives of the National Debt Repayment Movement	국채보상운동 기록물	The Archives of the National Debt Redemption Movement is a documentary heritage chronicling the entire process and history of a nationwide campaign undertaken by the Korean public from 1907 to 1910, to help their government pay back a huge debt owed to Japan and thereby save their country from colonization.	
2017	Joseon Tongsinsa	조선통신사 기록물	Documents on Joseon Tongsinsa/Chosen Tsushinshi: The History of Peace Building and Cultural Exchanges between Korea and Japan from the 17th to 19th Century	
2023	Archives of the April 19 Revolution	4.19혁명 기록물	The Archives of the April 19 Revolution refers to an extensive collection of documentary materials about the student-initiated, pro-democracy movement that erupted in the spring of 1960 in the Republic of Korea.	
2023	Archives of the Donghak Peasant Revolution	동학농민혁명 기록물	The Donghak movement was a popular uprising against both corruption in the ruling class and encroachment on Korea by foreign powers, demanding the establishment of a more just and equal society.	

== Criticism ==
The cultural heritage program of South Korea is generally considered a success both by academics and the public, however, a few issues remain to be addressed. One of them is the selection process of the "holders", as the prestige and state support of the position creates high competition between folk artists to be selected. According to Choi Sung-ja, a member of the Intangible Cultural Heritage Subcommittee, the intangible cultural heritage program should not be tied exclusively to the existence of "holders", and a less subjective selection process should be introduced. Since 2009 the CHA changed its selection process by involving academic professionals to introduce a more objective evaluation system of "holders".

Changes in society also brought challenges to the program. For example, in the 1990s Christian groups started to question the need to classify shamanistic rituals as cultural heritage. Patriarchal lifestyle, where the man is the main provider of the family and women stay at home, also influenced "holders", as housewives started to pick up the preservation of folk traditions also in areas that were previously dominated by men. The government resisted appointing female holders for such predominantly male traditions but was gradually forced to acknowledge them when there were no male practitioners at all, or where the women were significantly more talented than the men.

According to Roald Maliangkay of The Australian National University, the program faces challenges from the Korean Wave, as well. As Korean culture is becoming more popular worldwide, due to the influence of television series and K-pop, South Korea started to use its culture as a means of soft power, involving its cultural heritage, too. Maliangkay thinks that

"...a society’s image abroad is not shaped entirely by cultural activities. It is, instead, shaped by the combined total of what people abroad see and hear, and what they know about aspects they consider important, whether those are positive or not. [...] Even a society that cares greatly for its people and its heritage may not have a very positive image abroad, and vice versa. South Korea cannot control what people abroad will come to understand about its society and culture either.

== See also ==
- Seoul Future Heritage – a similar designation from the Seoul Metropolitan Government
- Oraegage – a similar designation from the Seoul Metropolitan Government
- Heritage preservation in North Korea
- Ichpedia
