= Divided family =

Separated family due to war

A divided family is a close family unit or people of the wider family who are separated from each other by borders of one or more countries and are therefore temporarily or permanently not able to live together. The reasons for the separation is usually political conflict or family members are given citizenships of different countries. For example, the division of the Korean peninsula and the division of Germany through the inner German border divided families through political conflicts. Both cases were caused by a rearrangement of national boundaries.

However, families can also be divided if national boundaries remain unchanged, but instead groups of people or individuals are moved, forced to leave or flee. Forced displacement such as flight from persecution, violence or a severe lack of public order can be causes of divided families. For example, over 100,000 unaccompanied minors applied for asylum in other countries in 2015. Other examples are population transfer, third country resettlement and deportation. Many countries offer programmes for family reunification that allows divided families to live together again.

== Division of the Korean Peninsula ==
The division of the Korean peninsula is one of the last remaining relics of the Cold War. Since the end of the Korean War in 1953, there has been virtually no contact between the citizens of the two countries, including the many families who were divided during the turmoil that engulfed Korea after liberation from Japanese rule and during the three-year Korean War. Many people in both North Korea and South Korea have lost contact with the rest of their family, and are unable to communicate with them due to strict regulations across borders. In the 1980s, South Korea held special programs to reunite divided families.

Between 1910 and 1945 Korea lost sovereignty and was colonized by Japan, which caused millions of Koreans to disperse. Between 25% and 35% were separated after the liberation right before the Korean War. The vast majority of the divided families (i.e. between 65% and 75%) were separated by the start of the Korean War on and around June 25, 1950. Seoul, the capital, was taken in 3 days. The largest seaborne evacuation from the North was from Hungnam between 15 and 24 December 1950, when 86,000 refugees along with UN Forces escaped from North Korean and Chinese forces. Millions more fled their homes to flee south. All communication with their relatives, due to the Iron Curtain that divided the peninsula left many not knowing the whereabouts and well-being of their loved ones who remained behind in the North. There were fathers and brothers who left their mothers behind, thinking they would be able to return in a few days, only to lose their relatives for a lifetime. Mothers who left their children behind, only to never be able to see them again. Children who became lost in the mad scramble of huge crowds of people flooding the paths to escape. The United Nations Command includes a provision in the armistice regarding the ‘voluntary’ repatriation of displaced persons. But after the 'armistice, the Korean Demilitarized Zone (DMZ), at the 38th parallel between North and South Korea, becomes the most heavily militarized border in the world.

Some divided families between South Korea and the Korean diaspora who live in Western countries were able to reunite. In 2010 there were 1.7 million Americans of Korean descent residing in the United States. 100,000 Korean Americans are estimated to be members of a divided family, who still have kin living in North Korea. In 1903 the first Korean Americans arrived in Hawaii as laborers. From 1975 - and after the Immigration and Nationality Act of 1965, abolishing quotas on the number of Asians allowed to enter the United States, was passed - Koreans began immigrating to the United States in large numbers, becoming one of the top five countries of origin of immigrants to the United States. Korean American pastors began to visit North Korea to search for their family members as well as the family members of those in their congregations.

However, reuniting divided families between the two Koreas remains difficult due to lack of communication. The problems posed by these divided families is a pressing humanitarian issue that has been used for political ends by the governments on both sides of the 38th parallel north over the last five decades. Most families do not know the fate of their relatives on the other side of the border. Following the historic summit of 2000 in Pyongyang, there have been several rounds of reunions, but the number of families affected remains low. For many of the first generation, divided families' time is running out, as many pass away before seeing their relatives again.

“By 28 June 2001, a mere 11 months after the first round of reunions in August 2000, 12,664 of the 116,460 original applicants for reunion had died. These figures clearly underline the pressing need for a solution to be found to this issue before the first generation of divided families finally disappear from the two Koreas’ societies, and the infringement of their fundamental human rights they have endured for so long becomes irreversible.”

“Clearly the most stressful psychological factor in their predicament is the uncertainty surrounding their loved ones’ fates. 83% had no idea of the whereabouts or status of their relatives. Although a small percentage of respondents (3%) said they had no desire to contact family members in the North, 88% said that they would like to contact their relatives.”

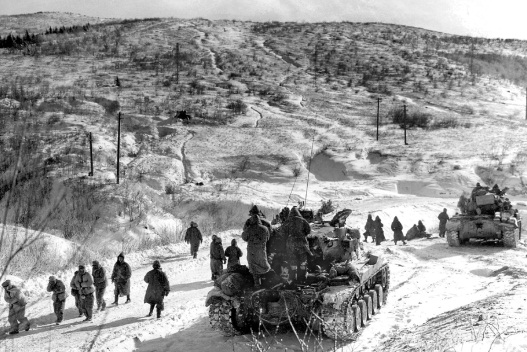
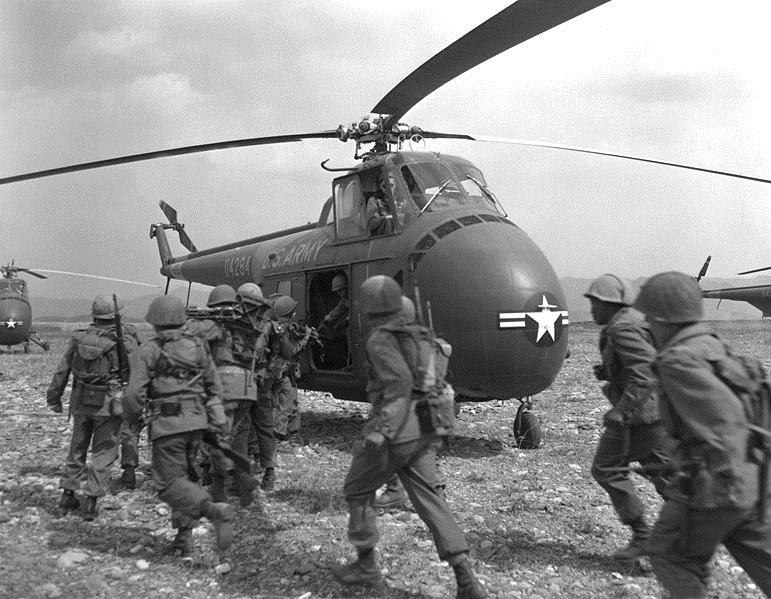
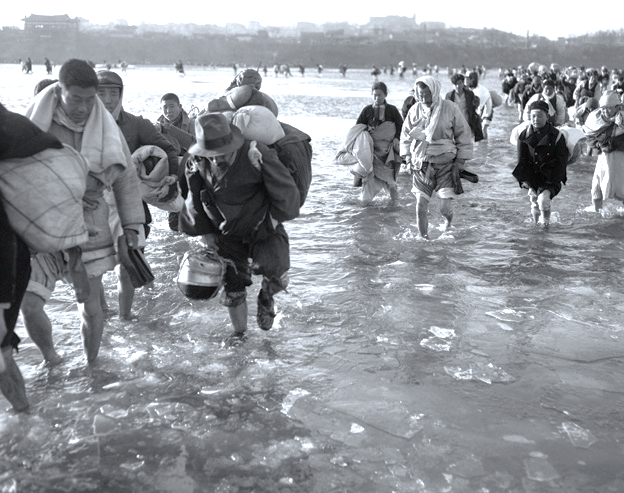
The picture of Korean War, in 1950

=== Reunions ===
Between 1970 and 1980 South Korea began to catch up with North Korea in economic development. In 1971-1972 the Red Cross talks regarding divided families ended without any agreement being reached. In 1983 the Korean Broadcasting System hosted the Finding Dispersed Families telethon that attracted millions looking for their divided families, but it was only broadcast within South Korea, due to North Korea's non-participation. Still, after the 95 minute program was extended to 453 hours and 45 minutes due to overwhelming response, 10,000 out of 109,000 applicants were reunited.

In 1980 Choong Lim Chun, a Canadian, began to reunite divided families, including Korean Americans, after receiving a letter and picture of his older sister in 1979 from a security guard for North Korea's Olympic team, while working as a reporter for the New Korea Times. Although Korean Americans initiated contact, North Koreans sought their relatives as well by advertising in North Korean media and later, applying to meet them. Following his death in 1995, his wife Soon Young has continued his work.

Between 1989 and 1991 were the three “Golden Years” for Korean Americans. Politician and activist, Lim Su-kyung, publicly advocated for reunification and reunions. Lim even travelled to Pyongyang, but was arrested for violating the National Security Act after she returned to the South through Panmunjom. Travel to the North was abundant. However, this was followed by the “Dark Times” between 1992–1997, because North Korea ended Korean American visitations due to complaints from its general populace about preferential treatment given to the family members of Korean Americans.

In 2000 June 13–15, a Summit between South Korean President Kim Dae Jung and North Korean leader Kim Jong Il was held, where South and North Korea agreed to host reunions. Only Korean Americans who were related to South Korean candidates were able to participate. According to the 2000 U.S. Census Bureau, there were between 1.2 and 1.4 million Korean Americans.

In 2001 there was a trial exchange of correspondence between 300 members from each side. According to calculation in 2001, 12,664 of the 116,460 South Koreans who originally applied to the National Red Cross died less than a year after their application – 10.9% of the total number of applicants from the South. Also in 2001 Korean Americans, encouraged by South Korean reunions, collected more than 100,000 signatures in support of Korean American reunions. Because of their work, House Concurrent Resolution 77 (Rep. Xavier Becerra and Rep. Ed Royce) and Senate Concurrent Resolution 90 passed, in support of Korean American reunions.

In 2007 the Divided Families Foundation (previously Saemsori) lobbied to create the Congressional Commission on Divided Families, co-chaired by Rep. Mark Kirk and Rep. Jim Matheson. A State Department letter to Matheson directed him to the Divided Families Foundation and the Korean Red Cross regarding his divided family constituent, Wan Chan No. The Congressional Research Service estimated there were between 104,000 and 500,000 Korean Americans with North Korean family members and stated that only 80 Korean Americans had met their relatives through their kin in South Korean reunions.

There were no reunions in 2008 after the election of President Lee Myung-bak and his stop to unconditional aid. Section 1265 of the National Defense Authorization Act for Fiscal Year 2008, directed the President to report to Congress on family reunions between U.S. citizens and their relatives in North Korea. The 2009 House Report 111-187 (accompanying H.R. 3081 – State, Foreign Operations, and Related Programs Appropriations Bill, 2010) "urges the Special Representative on North Korea Policy, as the senior official handling North Korea issues, to prioritize the issues involving Korean divided families, and to, if necessary, appoint a coordinator for such families."

In 2010–2011 the Divided Families Foundation restarted lobbying, and created an internship program with the 111th Congress and the Obama Administration Divided Families Foundation which partnered with the American Red Cross to deliver 3 Red Cross Messages to North Korea. On 2012 Mar 24 the Divided Families Foundation kicked off its registration drive with 588 letters to addresses received from the South Korean Ministry of Unification and on Mar 27, Amb. Robert King recommended that Korean American divided families members register with the American Red Cross, just as in South Korea.

==== South Korean - North Korean family reunions ====
- Sep 21-24, 1985
- Aug 15-18, 2000
- Nov 30-Dec 2, 2000
- Feb 26-28, 2001
- Apr 28-May 3, 2002
- Sep 13-18, 2002
- Jun 27-Jul 2, 2003
- Sep 20-25, 2003
- Mar 29(Apr 1?)-3, 2004
- Jul 11-16, 2004
- Aug 15, 2005 (video)
- Aug 26-31, 2005
- Nov 5-10, 2005
- Nov 24-25, 2005 (video)
- Dec 8-9, 2005 (video)
- Mar 20-25, 2006
- Jun 19-30, 2006
- Feb 27-28, 2006 (video)
- May 9–14, 2007
- Oct 17-22, 2007
- Sep 26-Oct 1, 2009
- Oct 30-Nov 5, 2010
- Feb 20-25, 2014
- Oct 20-26, 2015
- Aug 20-26, 2018
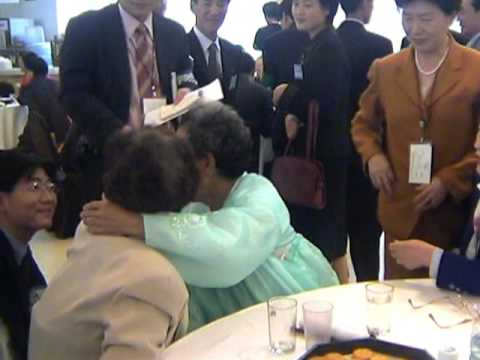
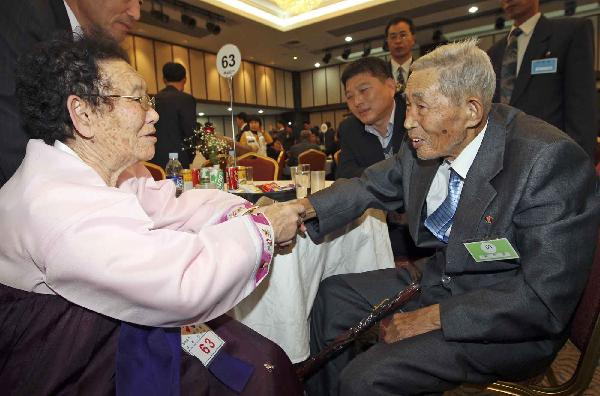
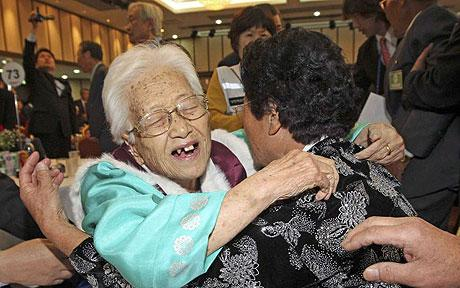
Korean Divided Families' Reunion

== Former division of Germany ==
Many German families were divided between 1961, when the Berlin Wall and the inner German border were erected, and the fall of the Berlin wall in 1989 and the German reunification. "The wall divided friends, families and loved ones, causing people on both sides to lose their jobs and livelihoods if trapped on the wrong side."

== See also ==
- Displaced person
