= Divided Families Foundation =

American non-profit organization

The Divided Families Foundation, formerly known as Saemsori or the Saemsori Project (Korean: 샘소리 프로젝트), is an American NGO that advocates for reunions for Korean American Divided Families who are seeking to reunite with their relatives in North Korea, whom they have not seen for 60 years since the Korean War in the 1950s. Unlike previous first-generation divided families organizations, the Divided Families Foundation began in 2006 by focusing on lobbying the American government as well as raising public awareness, and in 2007, created the Congressional Commission on Divided Families, a caucus co-chaired by then Rep. Mark Kirk and Rep. Jim Matheson.
