= Korea Heritage Service =

South Korean government agency

- 국가유산청

Agency overview
- Formed: 24 May 1999
- Preceding agency: Bureau of Cultural Property
- Jurisdiction: Government of South Korea
- Headquarters: 189 Cheongsa-ro Seo-gu Daejeon, South Korea
- Employees: 270
- Agency executives: Huh Min, Administrator; Choi Bokgeun, Vice Administrator
- Parent department: Ministry of Culture, Sports and Tourism
- Website: Cultural Heritage Administration English website

Korean name
- Hangul: 국가유산청
- Hanja: 國家遺産廳
- RR: Gukgayusancheong
- MR: Kukkayusanch'ŏng

The Korea Heritage Service (Korean: 국가유산청), formerly the Cultural Heritage Administration and Cultural Properties Administration, is the agency of the South Korean government charged with preserving and promoting Korean cultural heritage. It is headquartered in the city of Daejeon at the Daejeon Government Complex. Previously part of the Ministry of Culture and Tourism, it was elevated to a sub-ministerial agency in 1999.

== History ==
The Cultural Properties Administration was formally established in October 1961, but descends from the Former Royal Properties Administration to the Office created in November 1945 at the beginning of American military rule to replace the Office of the Yi Dynasty. The 1962 Cultural Property Protection Law was modelled on the Japanese 1950 Law for the Protection of Cultural Properties.

On May 17, 2024, the Cultural Heritage Administration changed its name to "Korea Heritage Service". The name change also accompanied a reported structural overhaul.

== Administration ==
In accordance with Article 2 of the 1962 Cultural Property Protection Law, cultural heritage is classified in four main categories: Tangible Cultural Heritage (including National Treasures); Intangible Cultural Heritage (including Important Intangible Cultural Heritage); Monuments (including Historic Sites, Scenic Sites, and Natural Monuments); and Folklore Cultural Heritage (including both tangible and intangible assets).

In 2010, the CHA was involved with the Gwanghwamun restoration project, where a new name plate on the restored Gate was unveiled on the same day. However, cracks in the wooden plate were showing by early November, where a long vertical crack is visible on the left side of Hanja character "Gwang" and beneath "Hwa" in the middle. The Administration cited the dry autumn weather for the contraction of the wood, but experts differs on that an immature pine board was used to meet the deadline for completion and that the wood had not dried properly. After many debates, a repair to the cracks was made, and the Government commissioned a new name plate. 13 wooden boards for the new signboard were cut in September 2011 and have since undergone a natural drying process in Gangwon Province. However, in a survey of 5,000 people conducted by the Administration, 58.7 percent responded that the inscription should be in Hangul while 41.3 percent opted Hanja but the long-lost 1395 original was in Hanja. A majority of experts consulted thought the sign should be carved as the original had been.

In December 2012, following the folk song "Arirang" being inscribed on the Representative List of the Intangible Cultural Heritage of Humanity programme by UNESCO, the Administration announced a five-year plan to promote and preserve the song. The plan is aim to support "Arirang" festivals by regional organizations, as well as building an archive for the song, exhibitions, fund research; of which it has allocated ₩33.6 billion.

== See also ==
- Korean culture
- Heritage preservation in South Korea
- National Treasures of South Korea
- Important Intangible Cultural Properties of Korea
- National Treasures of North Korea
- Office of the Yi Dynasty
- Jeonju Lee Royal Family Association
- United Nations Memorial Cemetery, in Busan – registered as site 359 in 2007
- Philippine Registry of Cultural Property
- National Commission for Culture and the Arts
- Ichpedia
