= Office of the Yi Dynasty =

1911–1945 Korean royal organization

Japanese name
- Kanji: 李王職
Transcriptions
- Romanization: Ri-ō Shoku

Korean name
- Hangul: 이왕직
- Hanja: 李王職
Transcriptions
- Revised Romanization: Iwangjik
- McCune–Reischauer: Iwangjik

The Office of the Yi Dynasty or Yiwangjik (Korean: 이왕직) was an organization that managed the affairs of the royal House of Yi of Korea during the Japanese occupation. It was established in February 1911 as part of the Japanese central government's Imperial Household Ministry but was under the day-to-day supervision of the Government-General of Korea.

Yiwangjik took over the responsibilities of the former Gungnaebu of the Korean Empire. This included the imperial household, property, rituals, and institutions such as the museum, zoo and gardens set up at Changgyeonggung Palace. Likewise it also continued the record-keeping traditions of the Seongjeonwon Diaries and the imperial Veritable Records. However, unlike the situation before 1910 where the Korean emperor could make decisions regarding the budget and staffing, the ex-emperor had no such power over Yiwangjik, a department of the Imperial Household Ministry. For similar reasons, the current South Korean government considers imperial records written under Japanese supervision to be unreliable, and is the reason why its nomination of the Annals for UNESCO Memory of the World registration excluded the volumes relating to Gojong and Sunjong and unlike the Annals for Joseon's other 25 kings does not consider the post-1910 Annals to be National Treasures.

Yi-wang-jik, or Ri-o-shoku, translates to the "Yi Kings' Household". (Compare to the Emperor Emeritus' Household, Jyokou-shoku 上皇職, or the Crown Prince's Household Koushi-shoku 皇嗣職 of the present-day Imperial Household Agency.) Yi-wang or Ri-o (李王), literally "King Yi", is the title devised for the ex-Emperor of Korea within the Kazoku system. Other translations of the name into English exist. After WWII, the US Military Government officially used the name Prince Lee Household.

Yiwangjik's offices were at Changdeokgung Palace on the site of what is now the Changdeokgung Management Office. The Yiwangjik building, as well as many Yiwangjik records, burned down in a suspected arson on the night of 6 June 1960.

== Legacy ==
Under the US military government Yiwangjik was renamed to the Office for the Former Royal Family (구왕궁) on 8 November 1945 and on 8 June 1955 the Former Imperial Properties Affairs Office (구황실재산사무총국). On 2 October 1961 this office became the Bureau of Cultural Property with responsibilities broadened to cover all former dynasties rather than just Yi Dynasty affairs. On 1 January 2019 the administration of Yi Dynasty properties were once again separated into their own organization, the Royal Palaces and Tombs Center (궁능유적본부) of the Cultural Heritage Administration.

There was no systematic preservation of the imperial family's movable property (furniture, pottery etc) after WWII, and they became scattered amongst the Yiwangjik descendant organisations and palace storerooms. To gather up the dispersed relics the Cultural Heritage Administration established the Palace Relics Exhibition Hall (궁중유물전시관) in 1992, which later became the National Palace Museum in 2005.

Imperial rites such as the Jongmyo Daeje are now managed through the Jeonju Lee Royal Family Association, which is a private organisation managed by the former Imperial family's descendants. Nonetheless Jongmyo Daeje continues to be held at the Jongmyo site which is now under the management of the Royal Palaces and Tombs Center, with the music performed by National Gugak Center musicians.

Other institutions connected to Yiwangjik include:

- Yiwangjik's Music Department merged after the Second World War with other folk music organizations to form the National Gugak Center in 1951.
- The Jangseogak (장서각, 藏書閣), or library, of Yiwangjik was transferred in 1981 to the Academy of Korean Studies.
- The Imperial Museum (Jesil Bakmulgwan, 제실박물관, 帝室博物館) established in 1909 during Sunjong's reign continued under Yiwangjik management (with name changes and mergers) during the Japanese period, continued after 1945 as the Deoksugung Museum, and was merged into the National Museum of Korea in 1969.
- The Yiwangjik Art Manufactory (이왕직미술품제작소, 李王職美術品製作所), established in 1908, closed in 1937. However its existence ensured the transmission of Korean fine art techniques from the Joseon period to the modern period, and many of its artisans were given the Important Intangible Cultural Property designation after Korean independence.

== Heads of Yiwangjik ==
- Min Byeong-seok (閔丙奭), 1911-1919
- Lee Jae-geuk (李載克), 1919-1923
- Min Yeong-gi (閔泳綺), 1923-1927
- Han Chang-su (韓昌洙), 1927-1932
- Shinoda Jisaku (篠田治策), 1932-1940
- Lee Hang-gu (李恒九), 1940-1945 (son of Lee Wan Yong)
- Jang Heon-shik (張憲植), 1945

Appointed Chief Administrator of Yiwangjik by the United States Army Military Government in Korea:

- Yun Hong-seob (尹弘燮), 3 November 1945-...

== See also ==
- Jeonju Lee Royal Family Association
- Cultural Heritage Administration, its modern descendant
- Governor-General of Korea
- Japan-Korea Annexation Treaty
- Korean History Compilation Committee
- Annals of the Joseon Dynasty
- Imperial Household Agency
