= Heritage preservation in North Korea =

Heritage preservation in North Korea has been administered by different laws and governing bodies over time.

== History ==
After liberation of Korea in 1945, North Korea published the "Treasure, relic, scenic site, natural monuments conservation act" in April 1946, and installed the "ancient relic conservation committee" to administer the conservation of national heritage.But upon a decision by the cabinet, it was replaced with the "Conservation of relics of materialc culture act" and the organization administering the conservation was renamed the "material culture artefact investigation and conservation committee." In 1994, the "Cultural heritage protection act" was legislated in 1994. The legislation only considers artefacts of material culture and was classified into three categories,National treasure level artefacts,Quasi-national treasure level(then also called conservation grade relics) and general artefacts. In 2012, "the cultural heritage law" was legislated, which compared to the law in 1994, included non material culture heritage(some media translate as non-material cultural properties) designations(equivalent to intangible cultural assets), that are designated at a state or local level, and artefacts and historic relics having its own separate numbering system, designations and classification systems(the 1994 did not differentiate between the two and put under the single name artefact, with three classifications but the new law classifies artefacts into two as national and general, and in terms of historic relics classifies into three as national, quasi national, and general.).In 2015, the new "national heritage protection law" included the designations of natural heritage through a separate sublaw.

== Types ==
The lists presented in these following links are based on data from 2005, when the 1994 law was still in effect.

- National Treasure (North Korea)
- Cultural assets of North Korea(Quasi national treasures classifications as of 2005)

The lists presented in these following inks are based on data from 2015.

- Non-material culture heritage of North Korea: Pungsan dog is designated as a state level non material cultural heritage along with methods to raise the dog and depictions of the dog in literature.Dog meat soup of Kyongsong was designated as a local non material cultural heritage. Making of Korean tofu was designated as a state level non material cultural heritage. 8 new entries of state level non material heritage was added in 2018. In 2021, ritual rites to dangun was designated as state level non material cultural heritage. From 2012 to 2018, 108 entries have been designated in the classification.

== See also ==
- Heritage preservation in South Korea
