= National Folklore Cultural Heritage (South Korea) =

National heritage protection designation

National Folklore Cultural Heritage (Korean: 국가민속문화재; Hanja: 國家民俗文化財) is a national-level designation within the heritage preservation system of South Korea. It is intended to preserve customs, objects, places, and buildings that are important to Korean folklore.

The designation attempts to protect things considered important or important for understanding the daily life, business, transportation, communication, entertainment, socializing, religion, or events of Korea.

== List ==
No. (Note: On November 19, 2021, the Cultural Heritage Administration removed the numbering system for all of its designations, including Treasure. Previously assigned numbers are preserved here for the sake of reference.)	Image	Official names (Note: (English, Hangul, Hanja/mixed script))	Location	Dates	Refs
1		Semi-formal Jacket Worn by Princess Deokon 덕온공주 당의 德溫公主 唐衣	Dankook University Seokjujeon Memorial Museum, Yongin, Gyeonggi	1964-12-7	
2		Official Attire Worn by Sim Dong-sin 심동신 금관조복 沈東臣 金冠朝服	Dankook University Seokjujeon Memorial Museum, Yongin, Gyeonggi	1964-12-7	
3		Clothes Worn by King Gwanghaegun, His Queen Consort, and a Court Lady 광해군 내외 및 상궁 옷 光海君 內外 및 尙宮 옷	Haeinsa, Hapcheon County, South Gyeongsang	1965-10-12	
4		Clothes Worn by Yi Dan-ha and His Wife 외재 이단하 내외 옷 畏齋 李端夏 內外 옷	Jeongseon County, Gangwon	1965-10-12	
5		Seongyojang House, Gangneung 강릉 선교장 江陵 船橋莊	Gangneung, Gangwon	1967-4-20	
6		Clothes Worn by Kim Byeong-gi and His Family 사영 김병기 일가 옷 思穎 金炳冀 一家 옷	Korea University Museum, Seoul	1968-2-19	
7		Guardian Post of Munhwa-dong, Chungmu 통영 문화동 벅수 統營 文化洞 벅수	Tongyeong, South Gyeongsang	1968-11-23, 2015-11-16일 renamed	
8		Unjoru Historic House, Gurye 구례 운조루 고택 求禮 雲鳥樓 古宅	Gurye County, South Jeolla	1968-11-25, 2017-2-28 renamed	
9		Guardian Post of Munhwa-dong, Chungmu 삼덕리 마을제당 三德里 마을祭堂	Tongyeong, South Gyeongsang	1968-11-23	
10		Historic House of the Jinyang Ha Clan, Changnyeong 창녕 진양하씨 고택 昌寧 晉陽河氏 古宅	Changnyeong County, South Gyeongsang	1968-11-25, 2017-2-28 renamed	
11		Stone Guardian Post of Bulhoesa Temple, Naju 나주 불회사 석장승 羅州 佛會寺 石長栍	Naju, South Jeolla	1968-12-12	
12		Stone Guardian Post of Unheungsa Temple, Naju 나주 운흥사 석장승 羅州 雲興寺 石長栍	Naju, South Jeolla	1968-12-12	
13		Clothes and Belt Worn by Jeong Won-yong, Gyeongsan 경산 정원용 의대 經山 鄭元容 衣帶	National Folk Museum of Korea, Seoul	1968-12-12	
14		Village Guardians of Ogeo-ri, Gochang 고창 오거리 당산 高敞 五巨里 堂山	Gochang County, North Jeolla	1969-12-15	
15		Stone Guardian Post of Silsangsa Temple, Namwon 남원 실상사 석장승 南原 實相寺 石長栍	Namwon, North Jeolla	1969-12-15	
16		Bangsangsi Mask 방상시 탈 方相氏 탈	National Museum of Korea, Seoul	1970-3-24	
17		Paintings of Shamanistic Spirits in Guksadang Shrine 국사당의 무신도 國師堂의 巫神圖	Jongno District, Seoul	1970-3-24	
18		Village Guardians within the West Gate of Buan 부안 서문안 당산 扶安 西門안 堂山	Buan County, North Jeolla	1970-5-20	
19		Village Guardians within the East Gate of Buan 부안 동문안 당산 扶安 東門안 堂山	Buan County, North Jeolla	1970-5-20	
20		Village Guardians of Seocheon-ri, Namwon 남원 서천리 당산 南原 西川里 堂山	Namwon, North Jeolla	1970-5-20	
21		Artifacts Used by General Nam I-heung and His Family 남이흥장군 일가 유품 南以興將軍 一家 遺品	Dangjin, South Chungcheong	1970-12-19	
22		Artifacts Used by Yun Jeung and His Family 윤증 가의 유품 尹拯 家의 遺品	Gongju, South Chungcheong	1970-12-19	
23		Songcheom Head House in Yangdong Village, Gyeongju 경주 양동마을 송첨 종택 慶州 良洞마을 松詹 宗宅	Gyeongju, North Gyeongsang	1970-12-29, 2017-2-28 renamed	
24		Maesan Historic House and Sansujeong Pavilion, Yeongcheon 영천 매산 고택과 산수정 永川 梅山 古宅과 山水亭	Yangcheon, North Gyeongsang	1970-12-29, 2017-2-28 renamed	
~~25~~		~~의성김동주씨가옥~~	~~Uiseong County, North Gyeongsang~~	1970-12-29, 1988-12-23 removed damaged by fire	
26		Gim Myeong-gwan‘s Historic House, Jeongeup 정읍 김명관 고택 井邑 金命寬 古宅	Jeongeup, North Jeolla	1971-5-27, 2017-2-28 renamed	
27		Historic House of "Rich Man" Choe, Gyeongju 경주 최부자댁 慶州 崔富者宅	Gyeongju, North Gyeongsang	1971-5-27, 2017-2-28 renamed	
28		Guksadang Shrine of Inwangsan Mountain 인왕산 국사당 仁旺山 國師堂	Jongno District, Seoul	1973-7-16	
29		Buddhist Monk Samyeong's Outer Vestment and Robe 사명대사의 금란가사와 장삼 泗溟大師의 金襴袈裟와 長衫	Miryang, South Gyeongsang	1973-7-16	
30-1		Artifacts of Peddlers 보부상 유품(1) 褓負商 遺品(1)	Gongju, South Chungcheong	1973-7-16	
30-2		Artifacts of Peddlers 보부상 유품(2) 褓負商 遺品(2)	Yesan County, South Chungcheong	1973-7-16	
30-3		Artifacts of Peddlers 보부상 유품(3) 褓負商 遺品(3)	Buyeo County, South Chungcheong	1973-7-16	
30-4		Artifacts of Peddlers 보부상 유품(4) 褓負商 遺品(4)	Gongju, South Chungcheong	1973-7-16	
30-5		Artifacts of Peddlers 보부상 유품(5) 褓負商 遺品(5)	Gongju, South Chungcheong	1973-7-16	
30-6		Artifacts of Peddlers 보부상 유품(6) 褓負商 遺品(6)	Gongju, South Chungcheong	1973-7-16	
31		Bier of Nameundeul Village 남은들 상여 남은들 喪輿	National Palace Museum of Korea, Seoul	1974-3-15	
32		Horse Mill of Aewol, Jeju 제주 애월 말방아 濟州 涯月 말방아	Jeju Province	1975-10-13	
33		Shingled House and Folk Artifacts in Sin-ri, Samcheok 삼척 신리 너와집과 민속유물 三陟 新里 너와집과 民俗遺物	Samcheok, Gangwon	1975-10-21, 2017-2-28 renamed	
34		Wolam Head House, Gyeongju 경주 월암 종택 慶州 月菴 宗宅	Gyeongju, North Gyeongsang	1977-1-8	
35		Horn Bow 각궁 角弓	Nowon District, Seoul	1976-12-31	
36		Artifacts Used by General Jeong Chung-sin 정충신장군 유품 鄭忠信將軍 遺品	Seosan, South Chungcheong	1978-6-21	
37		Clothes Excavated from the Tombs of Yi Cheon-gi and His Family, Hakseong 학성 이천기 일가 묘 출토복식 鶴城 李天機 一家 墓 出土服飾	Nam District, Ulsan	1979-1-23	
38		Clothes Excavated from the Tomb of Hong Geuk-ga 정공청 유품 鄭公淸 遺品	Nam District, Ulsan	1979-1-23	
39		Clothes Excavated from the Tomb of Hong Geuk-ga 고창 신재효 고택 高敞 申在孝 古宅	Gochang County, North Jeolla	1979-1-26	
40		Clothes Excavated from the Tomb of Hong Geuk-ga 홍극가 묘 출토복식 洪克家 墓 出土服飾	Andong, North Gyeongsang	1979-1-23	
41		Incense Bag with Embroidered Cloud and Phoenix Design 운봉수 향낭 雲鳳繡 香囊	Gangnam District, Seoul	1979-1-23	
42		Dharani Bag with Embroidered Sun and Moon Design 일월수 다라니주머니 日月繡 陀羅尼주머니	Gangnam District, Seoul	1979-1-23	
43		Horsehair Hat Worn by King Gojong (Presumed) 오조룡 왕비 보 五爪龍 王妃 補	Gangnam District, Seoul	1979-1-23	
44		Horsehair Hat Worn by King Gojong (Presumed) 전(傳) 고종 익선관 傳 高宗 翼善冠	Gwangjin District, Seoul	1979-1-23	
45		Horsehair Hat Worn by King Gojong (Presumed) 전(傳) 고종갓 傳 高宗 갓	Gwangjin District, Seoul	1979-1-23	
46		Jade Pendant Worn by King Gojong (Presumed) 전(傳) 고종 패옥 傳 高宗 佩玉	Gwangjin District, Seoul	1979-1-23	
47		Ceremonial Robe Worn by a Crown Princess 별전 괴불(17족) 別錢 괴불(17足)	Gwangjin District, Seoul	1979-1-23	
48		Ceremonial Robe Worn by a Crown Princess 동궁비 원삼 東宮妃 圓衫	Gwangjin District, Seoul	1979-1-23	
49		Yellow Ceremonial Robe Worn by an Empress (Presumed) 전(傳) 황후 황원삼 傳 皇后 黃圓衫	Gwangjin District, Seoul	1979-1-23	
50		Woman's Jade-green Silk Overcoat 옥색 명주 장옷 玉色 明紬 장옷	Gwangjin District, Seoul	1979-1-23	
51		Woman's Blue Boiled-silk Overcoat 청색 숙고사 장옷 靑色 熟庫紗 장옷	Gwangjin District, Seoul	1979-1-23	
52		Ceremonial Robe Worn by Royal Concubine Gwanghwadang 광화당 원삼 光華堂 圓衫	Gwangjin District, Seoul	1979-1-23	
53		Woman's Brown Silk Jacket 토황색 명주 저고리 土黃色 明紬 저고리	Gwangjin District, Seoul	1979-1-23	
54		Ceremonial Robe Worn by an Empress 황후 적의 皇后 翟衣	Gwangjin District, Seoul	1979-1-23	
55		Blue Ceremonial Shoes Worn by an Empress 황후 청석 皇后 靑舃	Gwangjin District, Seoul	1979-1-23	
56		Woman's Yellow-Brown Semi-formal Jacket 수복칠보석류문 황갈단 당의 壽福七寶石榴紋 黃褐緞 唐衣	Gwangjin District, Seoul	1979-1-23	
57		Woman's Yellow-Brown Semi-formal Jacket 수복칠보석류보상화문 황갈단 당의 壽福七寶石榴寶相花紋 黃褐緞 唐衣	Gwangjin District, Seoul	1979-1-23	
58		King's Robe with Dragon Insignia 곤룡포 부 용문보 袞龍袍 付 龍紋補	Gwangjin District, Seoul	1979-1-23	
59		Two-tiered Chest Embroidered with Ten Symbols of Longevity 십장생수 이층롱 十長生繡 二層籠	Yongsan District, Seoul	1979-1-23	
60		Folding Screen Embroidered with Grass and Insects (Four Panels) 초충수병(4폭) 草蟲繡屛(4幅)	Yongsan District, Seoul	1979-1-23	
61		Blue Silk Inner Robe 청초중단 靑綃中單	Seodaemun District, Seoul	1979-1-23	
62		Red Silk Robe 적초의 赤綃衣	Seodaemun District, Seoul	1979-1-23	
63		Green Ceremonial Robe for the Queen Consort 왕비 록원삼 王妃 綠圓衫	Seodaemun District, Seoul	1979-1-23	
~~64~~		~~자수요와 이불~~; ~~(刺繡요와 이불)~~	~~Seodaemun District, Seoul~~	1979-1-23, 1987-3-9 removed	
65		Heungseon Daewongun's Rank Badge with Girin Design 흥선대원군 기린흉배 興宣大院君 麒麟胸背	Suseong District, Daegu	1979-1-23	
66		King's Ceremonial Robe with Nine Embroidered Symbols 구장복 九章服	National Museum of Korea, Seoul	1979-1-23	
67		Patterns for the Queen Consort’s Ceremonial Robe and Front Cloth Panel 적의본 및 폐슬본 翟衣本 및 蔽膝本	National Museum of Korea, Seoul	1979-1-23	
68		Gaekjujip House in Seongeup Village, Jeju 제주 성읍마을 객주집 濟州 城邑마을 客主집	Seogwipo, Jeju	1979-1-26, 2017-2-28 renamed	
69		Go Pyeong-o's Historic House in Seongeup Village, Jeju 제주 성읍마을 고평오 고택 濟州 城邑마을 高平五 古宅	Seogwipo, Jeju	1979-1-26, 2017-2-28 renamed	
70		Go Chang-hwan's Historic House in Seongeup Village, Jeju 제주 성읍마을 고창환 고택 濟州 城邑마을 高昌煥 古宅	Seogwipo, Jeju	1979-1-26, 2017-2-28 renamed	
71		Han Bong-il's Historic House in Seongeup Village, Jeju 제주 성읍마을 한봉일 고택 濟州 城邑마을 韓奉日 古宅	Seogwipo, Jeju	1979-1-26, 2017-2-28 renamed	
72		The Blacksmith's House in Seongeup Village, Jeju 제주 성읍마을 대장간집 濟州 城邑마을 대장간집	Seogwipo, Jeju	1979-1-26, 2017-2-28 renamed	
73		Nakseondang Historic House in Yangdong Village, Gyeongju 경주 양동마을 낙선당 고택 慶州 良洞마을 樂善堂 古宅	Gyeongju, North Gyeongsang	1979-1-26, 2017-2-28 renamed	
74		Sahodang Historic House in Yangdong Village, Gyeongju 경주 양동마을 사호당 고택 慶州 良洞마을 沙湖堂 古宅	Gyeongju, North Gyeongsang	1979-1-26, 2017-2-28 renamed	
75		Sangchunheon Historic House in Yangdong Village, Gyeongju 경주 양동마을 상춘헌 고택 慶州 良洞마을 賞春軒 古宅	Gyeongju, North Gyeongsang	1979-1-26, 2017-2-28 renamed	
76		Geunam Historic House in Yangdong Village, Gyeongju 경주 양동마을 근암 고택 慶州 良洞마을 謹庵 古宅	Gyeongju, North Gyeongsang	1979-1-26, 2017-2-28 renamed	
77		Dugok Historic House in Yangdong Village, Gyeongju 경주 양동마을 두곡 고택 慶州 良洞마을 杜谷 古宅	Gyeongju, North Gyeongsang	1979-1-26, 2017-2-28 renamed	
78		Sujoldang Historic House in Yangdong Village, Gyeongju 경주 양동마을 수졸당 고택 慶州 良洞마을 守拙堂 古宅	Gyeongju, North Gyeongsang	1979-1-26, 2017-2-28 renamed	
79		Ihyangjeong Historic House in Yangdong Village, Gyeongju 경주 양동마을 이향정 고택 慶州 良洞마을 二香亭 古宅	Gyeongju, North Gyeongsang	1979-1-26, 2017-2-28 renamed	
80		Suunjeong Pavilion in Yangdong Village, Gyeongju 경주 양동마을 수운정 慶州 良洞마을 水雲亭	Gyeongju, North Gyeongsang	1979-1-26, 2017-2-28 renamed	
81		Simsujeong Pavilion in Yangdong Village, Gyeongju 경주 양동마을 심수정 慶州 良洞마을 心水亭	Gyeongju, North Gyeongsang	1979-1-26, 2017-2-28 renamed	
82		Allakjeong Lecture Hall in Yangdong Village, Gyeongju 경주 양동마을 안락정 慶州 良洞마을 安樂亭	Gyeongju, North Gyeongsang	1979-1-26, 2017-2-28 renamed	
83		Lecture Hall in Yangdong Village, Gyeongju 경주 양동마을 강학당 慶州 良洞마을 講學堂	Gyeongju, North Gyeongsang	1979-1-26, 2017-2-28 renamed	
84		Hwageongdang Historic House in Hahoe Village, Andong 안동 하회마을 화경당 고택 安東 河回마을 和敬堂 古宅	Andong, North Gyeongsang	1979-1-26, 2017-2-28 renamed	
85		Wonjijeongsa House in Hahoe Village, Andong 안동 하회마을 원지정사 安東 河回마을 遠志精舍	Andong, North Gyeongsang	1979-1-26, 2017-2-28 renamed	
86		Binyeonjeongsa House in Hahoe Village, Andong 안동 하회마을 빈연정사 安東 河回마을 賓淵精舍	Andong, North Gyeongsang	1979-1-26, 2017-2-28 renamed	
87		Jakcheon Historic House in Hahoe Village, Andong 안동 하회마을 작천 고택 安東 河回마을 鵲泉 古宅	Andong, North Gyeongsang	1979-1-26, 2017-2-28 renamed	
88		Ogyeonjeongsa House in Hahoe Village, Andong 안동 하회마을 옥연정사 安東 河回마을 玉淵精舍	Andong, North Gyeongsang	1979-1-26, 2017-2-28 renamed	
89		Gyeomamjeongsa House in Hahoe Village, Andong 안동 하회마을 겸암정사 安東 河回마을 謙菴精舍	Andong, North Gyeongsang	1979-1-26, 2017-2-28 renamed	
90		Yeomhaengdang Historic House in Hahoe Village, Andong 안동 하회마을 염행당 고택 安東 河回마을 念行堂 古宅	Andong, North Gyeongsang	1979-1-26, 2017-2-28 renamed	
91		Yangodang Historic House in Hahoe Village, Andong 안동 하회마을 양오당 고택 安東 河回마을 養吾堂古宅	Andong, North Gyeongsang	1979-1-26, 2017-2-28 renamed	
92		Ibangdaek House in Naganeupseong, Suncheon 순천 낙안읍성 이방댁 順天 樂安邑城 吏房宅	Suncheon, South Jeolla	1979-1-26, 2017-2-28 renamed	
93		Dlemarujip House in Naganeupseong, Suncheon 순천 낙안읍성 들마루집 順天 樂安邑城 들마루집	Suncheon, South Jeolla	1979-1-26, 2017-2-28 renamed	
94		Ttoechangjip House in Naganeupseong, Suncheon 순천 낙안읍성 뙤창집 順天 樂安邑城 뙤窓집	Suncheon, South Jeolla	1979-1-26, 2017-2-28 renamed	
95		House with Wooden Floored Room in Naganeupseong, Suncheon 순천 낙안읍성 마루방집 順天 樂安邑城 마루방집	Suncheon, South Jeolla	1979-1-26, 2017-2-28 renamed	
96		Bamboo Rafter House in Naganeupseong, Suncheon 순천 낙안읍성 대나무 서까래집 順天 樂安邑城 대나무 서까래집	Suncheon, South Jeolla	1979-1-26, 2017-2-28 renamed	
97		ㄱ Shaped House in Naganeupseong, Suncheon 순천 낙안읍성 ㄱ자집 順天 樂安邑城 ㄱ字집	Suncheon, South Jeolla	1979-1-26, 2017-2-28 renamed	
98		Old Tavern House in Naganeupseong, Suncheon 순천 낙안읍성 주막집 順天 樂安邑城 酒幕집	Suncheon, South Jeolla	1979-1-26, 2017-2-28 renamed	
99		House at the West Gate of City Wall in Naganeupseong, Suncheon 순천 낙안읍성 서문성벽집 順天 樂安邑城 西門城壁집	Suncheon, South Jeolla	1979-1-26, 2017-2-28 renamed	
100		Hyangridaek House in Naganeupseong, Suncheon 순천 낙안읍성 향리댁 順天 樂安邑城 鄕吏宅	Suncheon, South Jeolla	1979-1-26, 2017-2-28 renamed	
101		Stone Guardian Post of Chungsin-ri, Sunchang 순창 충신리 석장승 淳昌 忠信里 石長栍	Sunchang County, North Jeolla	1979-1-23	
102		Stone Guardian Post of Namgye-ri, Sunchang 순창 남계리 석장승 淳昌 南溪里 石長栍	Sunchang County, North Jeolla	1979-1-23	
103		Semi-formal Jacket Worn by a Queen Consort (Presumed) 전(傳) 왕비 당의 傳 王妃 唐衣	Gwangjin District, Seoul	1979-1-23	
104		Samgaheon Historic House, Dalseong 달성 삼가헌 고택 達城 三可軒 古宅	Dalseong County, Daegu	1979-12-31, 2007-1-29 renamed 2017-2-28 renamed	
105		Ssangam Historic House, Gumi 구미 쌍암고택 龜尾 雙巖古宅	Gumi, North Gyeongsang	1979-12-31	
106		Ungang Historic House and Manhwajeong Pavilion, Cheongdo 청도 운강 고택과 만화정 淸道 雲岡 故宅과 萬和亭	Cheongdo County, North Gyeongsang	1979-12-31, 2017-2-28 renamed	
107		Yeonjeong Historic House, Yeongcheon 영천 연정 고택 永川 蓮亭 古宅	Yeongcheon, North Gyeongsang	1979-12-31, 2017-2-28 renamed	
108		Seoseokji Garden, Yeongyang 영양 서석지 英陽 瑞石池	Yeongyang County, North Gyeongsang	1979-12-31	
109		Clothes and Letters of Lady Kim of the Suncheon Kim Clan Excavated from Cheongju 청주 출토 순천김씨 의복 및 간찰 淸州 出土 順天金氏 衣服 및 簡札	Cheongju, North Chungcheong	1979-12-28	
110		Clothes and Belt Worn by General Bak Sin-yong (Presumed) 전(傳) 박신용장군 의대 傳 朴信龍將軍 衣帶	Buyeo National Museum, Buyeo County, South Chungcheong	1980-4-1	
111		Clothes Worn by General Kim Deok-ryeong 김덕령장군 의복 金德齡將軍 衣服	Buk District, Gwangju	1980-4-1	
112		Clothes Excavated from the Tomb of Lady Im 장흥임씨 묘 출토복식 長興任氏 墓 出土服飾	Buk District, Gwangju	1980-4-1	
113		Clothes of Hong Jin-jong Kept at Korea University Museum 고대박물관 소장 홍진종 의복 高大博物館 所藏 洪鎭宗 衣服	Seongbuk District, Seoul	1980-4-1	
114		Clothes Excavated from the Tombs of the Gwangju Yi Clan, Gwacheon 과천 출토 광주이씨 의복 果川 出土 廣州李氏 衣服	Dankook University Seokjujeon Memorial Museum, Yongin, Gyeonggi	1981-11-29	
115		Clothes Worn by Lady Jeong, the Wife of Yi Hyeong 이형 부인 동래정씨 의복 李泂 夫人 東萊鄭氏 衣服	Jeonju Museum of History, Jeonju, North Jeolla	1981-11-29	
116		Artifacts Excavated from the Tomb of Lady Son, Cheongwon 청원 구례손씨 묘 출토유물 淸原 求禮孫氏 墓 出土遺物	Chungbuk National University Museum, Cheongju, North Chungcheong	1981-11-11	
117		Artifacts Excavated from the Tomb of General Bak, Cheongwon (Presumed) 청원 전(傳) 박장군 묘 출토유물 淸原 傳 朴將軍 墓 出土遺物	Chungbuk National University Museum, Cheongju, North Chungcheong	1981-11-11	
118		Artifacts Excavated from the Tomb of Kim Wi, Jungwon 중원 김위 묘 출토유물 中原 金緯 墓 出土遺物	Chungbuk National University Museum, Cheongju, North Chungcheong	1981-11-11	
119		Artifacts Used by Yi Hyeong-sang 병와 이형상 유품 甁窩 李衡祥 遺品	Yeongcheon, North Gyeongsang	1982-8-7	
120		Bier of Cheongpung Buwongun 청풍부원군 상여 淸風府院君 喪輿	Chuncheon National Museum, Chuncheon, Gangwon	1982-8-7	
121		Clothes Worn by Prince Heungwan 흥완군 의복 興完君 衣服	Yongsan District, Seoul	1983-4-11	
122		Hahoe Village, Andong 안동 하회마을 安東 河回마을	Andong, North Gyeongsang	1984-1-14	
123		Historic House of the Gwangju Yi Clan, Suwon 수원 광주이씨 고택 水原 廣州李氏 古宅	Suwon, Gyeonggi	1984-1-14, 2017-2-28 renamed	
124		Jeong Si-yeong's Historic House, Hwaseong 화성 정시영 고택 華城 鄭時永 古宅	Hwaseong, Gyeonggi	1984-1-14, 2017-2-28 renamed	
125		Jeong Su-yeong's Historic House, Hwaseong 화성 정수영 고택 華城 鄭壽永 古宅	Hwaseong, Gyeonggi	1984-1-14, 2017-2-28 renamed	
126		Historic House in Botong-ri, Yeoju 여주 보통리 고택 驪州 甫通里 古宅	Yeoju, Gyeonggi	1984-1-14, 2017-2-28 renamed	
127		Eo Jae-yeon's Historic House, Icheon 이천 어재연 고택 利川 魚在淵 古宅	Icheon, Gyeonggi	1984-1-14, 2017-2-28 renamed	
128		Historic house in Maegok-ri, Yangju 양주 매곡리 고택 楊州 梅谷里 古宅	Yangju, Gyeonggi	1984-1-14, 2017-2-28 renamed	
129		Donggwandaek House, Namyangju 남양주 동관댁 南楊州 東官宅	Namyangju, Gyeonggi	1984-1-14, 2017-2-28 renamed	
130		Gungjip House, Namyangju 남양주 궁집 南楊州 宮집	Namyangju, Gyeonggi	1984-1-14, 2017-2-28 renamed	
131		Eo Myeong-gi's Historic House, Goseong 고성 어명기 고택 高城 魚命驥 古宅	Goseong County, Gangwon	1984-1-14, 2017-2-28 renamed	
132		Soseok Historic House, Yeongdong 영동 소석 고택 永同 少石 古宅	Yeongdong County, North Chungcheong	1984-1-14	
133		Historic House in Goeun-ri, Cheongju 청주 고은리 고택 淸州 高隱里 古宅	Cheongwon County, North Chungcheong	1984-1-14, 2017-2-28 renamed	
134		Udang Historic House, Boeun 보은 우당 고택 報恩 愚堂 古宅	Boeun County, North Chungcheong	1984-1-14, 2017-2-28 renamed	
135		Yun Yang-gye's Historic House, Chungju 충주 윤양계 고택 忠州 尹養桂 古宅	Chungju, North Chungcheong	1984-1-14, 2017-2-28 renamed	
136		Gim Hang-muk's Historic House, Goesan 괴산 김항묵 고택 槐山 金恒默 古宅	Goesan County, North Chungcheong	1984-1-14, 1984-1-14 renamed, 2017-2-28 renamed	
137		Park Yong-won's Historic House, Jecheon 제천 박용원 고택 堤川 朴用元 古宅	Jecheon, North Chungcheong	1984-1-14, 2017-2-28 renamed	
138		Hongpanseodaek House, Sejong 세종 홍판서댁 世宗 洪判書宅	Bugang-myeon, Sejong City	1984-1-14, 2014-12-12 renamed, 2017-2-28 renamed, 2018-11-5 renamed	
139		Choegamchaldaek House, Boeun 보은 최감찰댁 報恩 崔監察宅	Boeun County, North Chungcheong	1984-1-14, 2017-2-28 renamed	
140		Gyudang Historic House, Yeongdong 영동 규당 고택 永同 圭堂 古宅	Yeongdong County, North Chungcheong	1984-1-14	
141		Historic House in Jaenmal, Eumseong 음성 잿말 고택 陰城 잿말 古宅	Eumseong County, North Chungcheong	1984-1-14, 2017-2-28 renamed	
142		Gimchampandaek House, Yeongdong 영동 김참판댁 永同 金參判宅	Yeongdong County, North Chungcheong	1984-1-14, 2017-2-28 renamed	
143		Historic House in Gongsanjeong, Eumseong 음성 공산정 고택 陰城 公山亭 古宅	Eumseong County, North Chungcheong	1984-1-14, 2017-2-28 renamed	
144		Seong Jang-hwan's Historic House, Yeongdong 영동 성장환 고택 永同 成章煥 古宅	Yeongdong County, North Chungcheong	1984-1-14, 2017-2-28 renamed	
145		Jo Deok-su's Historic House, Danyang 단양 조덕수 고택 丹陽 趙德壽 古宅	Danyang County, North Chungcheong	1984-1-14, 2017-2-28 renamed	
~~146~~		~~괴산이복기가옥~~; ~~(槐山이복기家屋)~~	~~Goesan County, North Chungcheong~~	1984-1-14, 1990-9-12 removed, 철거, 원형변경으로 문화재 가치 상실; 2002년 충북 민속문화재 제14로 재지정	
147		Song Byeong-il's Historic House, Goesan 괴산 송병일 고택 槐山 宋秉一 古宅	Goesan County, North Chungcheong	1984-1-14, 2017-2-28 renamed	
148		Jeong Won-tae's Historic House, Jecheon 제천 정원태 고택 堤川 鄭元泰 古宅	Jecheon, North Chungcheong	1984-1-14, 2017-2-28 renamed	
149		Mongsimjae Historic House, Namwon 남원 몽심재 고택 南原 夢心齋 古宅	Namwon, North Jeolla	1984-1-14, 2017-2-28 renamed	
150		Gim Sang-man's Historic House, Buan 부안 김상만 고택 扶安 金相萬 古宅	Buan County, North Jeolla	1984-1-14, 2017-2-28 renamed	
151		Gyeeun Historic House, Naju 나주 계은 고택 羅州 溪隱 古宅	Naju, South Jeolla	1984-1-14, 2017-2-28 renamed	
152		Yangchamsadaek House, Hwasun 화순 양참사댁 和順 梁參事宅	Hwasun County, South Jeolla	1984-1-14, 2017-2-28 renamed	
153		Yun Cheol-ha's Historic House, Haenam 해남 윤철하 고택 海南 尹哲夏 古宅	Haenam County, South Jeolla	1984-1-14, 2017-2-28 renamed	
154		Hakjae Historic House, Hwasun 화순 학재 고택 和順 鶴齋 古宅	Hwasun County, South Jeolla	1984-1-14, 2017-2-28 renamed	
155		Jehojeong Historic House, Gokseong 곡성 제호정 고택 谷城 霽湖亭 古宅	Gokseong County, South Jeolla	1984-1-14, 2017-2-28 renamed	
156		Historic House in Yureo-ri, Boseong 보성 율어리 고택 寶城 栗於里 古宅	Boseong County, South Jeolla	1984-1-14, 2017-2-28 renamed	
157		Yi Jeong-rae's Historic House, Boseong 보성 이정래 고택 寶城 李井來 古宅	Boseong County, South Jeolla	1984-1-14, 2017-2-28 renamed	
158		Yi Seung-rae's Historic House, Boseong 보성 이승래 고택 寶城 李昇來 古宅	Boseong County, South Jeolla	1984-1-14, 2017-2-28 renamed	
159		Yi Jin-rae's Historic House, Boseong 보성 이진래 고택 寶城 李進來 古宅	Boseong County, South Jeolla	1984-1-14, 2017-2-28 renamed	
160		Yi Jun-hoe's Historic House, Boseong 보성 이준회 고택 寶城 李駿會 古宅	Boseong County, South Jeolla	1984-1-14, 2017-2-28 renamed	
161		Jonjae Historic House, Jangheung 장흥 존재 고택 長興 存齋 古宅	Jangheung County, South Jeolla	1984-1-14	
162		Yeolhwajeong Pavilion, Boseong 보성 열화정 寶城 悅話亭	Boseong County, South Jeolla	1984-1-14	
163		Yi Yong-u's Historic House, Boseong 보성 이용우 고택 寶城 李容禹 古宅	Boseong County, South Jeolla	1984-1-14, 2017-2-28 renamed	
164		Samseongdang Historic House, Yeongam 영암 삼성당 고택 靈岩 三省堂 古宅	Yeongam County, South Jeolla	1984-1-14, 2017-2-28 renamed	
165		Woonam Historic House, Naju 나주 우남 고택 羅州 愚南 古宅	Naju, South Jeolla	1984-1-14, 2017-2-28 renamed	
~~166~~		~~진도한정석가옥~~; ~~(珍島한정석家屋)~~	~~Jindo County, South Jeolla~~	1984-1-10, 1990-9-12 removed, 원형 변경으로 문화재 가치 상실	
167		Historic House in Yugyo-ri, Muan 무안 유교리 고택 務安 柳橋里 古宅	Muan County, South Jeolla	1984-1-14, 2017-2-28 renamed	
168		Chunghyodang Head House, Yeongdeok 영덕 충효당 종택 盈德 忠孝堂 宗宅	Yeongdeok County, North Gyeongsang	1984-1-14, 2017-2-28 renamed	
169		Manhoe Historic House, Bonghwa 봉화 만회 고택 奉化 晩悔 古宅	Bonghwa County, North Gyeongsang	1984-1-14, 2017-2-28 renamed	
170		Ssangbyeokdang Head House, Bonghwa 봉화 쌍벽당 종택 奉化 雙碧堂 宗宅	Bonghwa County, North Gyeongsang	1984-1-14, 2017-2-28 renamed	
171		Gyeseodang Head House, Bonghwa 봉화 계서당 종택 奉化 溪西堂 宗宅	Bonghwa County, North Gyeongsang	1984-1-14, 2017-2-28 renamed	
172		Seongcheondaek House, Cheongsong 청송 성천댁 靑松 星川宅	Cheongsong County, North Gyeongsang	1984-1-14, 2017-2-28 renamed	
173		Husongdang Historic House, Cheongsong 청송 후송당 고택 靑松 後松堂 古宅	Cheongsong County, North Gyeongsang	1984-1-14, 2017-2-28 renamed	
174		Mulchedang Historic House, Yecheon 예천 물체당 고택 醴泉 勿替堂 古宅	Yecheon County, North Gyeongsang	1984-1-14, 2017-2-28 renamed	
175		Manchwidang Historic House, Yeongcheon 영천 만취당 고택 永川 晩翠堂 古宅	Yeongcheon, North Gyeongsang	1984-1-14, 2017-2-28 renamed	
176		Sugok Historic House, Andong 안동 수곡 고택 安東 樹谷 古宅	Andong, North Gyeongsang	1984-1-14, 2017-2-28 renamed	
177		Hadong Historic House in Hahoe Village, Andong 안동 하회마을 하동 고택 安東 河回마을 河東 古宅	Andong, North Gyeongsang	1984-1-14, 2017-2-28 renamed	
178		Ilseongdang Historic House, Andong 안동 일성당 고택 安東 日省堂 古宅	Andong, North Gyeongsang	1984-1-14, 2017-2-28 renamed	
179		Hagam Historic House, Andong 안동 학암고택 安東 鶴巖古宅	Andong, North Gyeongsang	1984-1-14	
180		Geunjaejaesa Ritual House of the Yean Yi Clan, Andong 안동 예안이씨 근재재사 安東 禮安李氏 近齋齋舍	Andong, North Gyeongsang	1984-1-14, 2017-2-28 renamed	
181		Doam Head House, Andong 안동 도암 종택 安東 陶庵 宗宅	Andong, North Gyeongsang	1984-1-14, 2017-2-28 renamed	
182		Seojijaesa Ritual House of the Uiseong Gim Clan, Andong 안동 의성김씨 서지재사 安東 義城金氏 西枝齋舍	Andong, North Gyeongsang	1984-1-14, 2017-2-28 renamed	
183		Neungdongjaesa Ritual House of the Andong Gwon Clan, Andong 안동 안동권씨 능동재사 安東 安東權氏 陵洞齋舍	Andong, North Gyeongsang	1984-1-14, 2017-2-28 renamed	
184		Oryuheon Historic House, Andong 안동 오류헌 고택 安東 五柳軒 古宅	Andong, North Gyeongsang	1984-1-14, 2017-2-28 renamed	
185		Head House of the Topdong Branch of the Goseong Yi Clan, Andong 안동 고성이씨 탑동파 종택 安東 固城李氏 塔洞派 宗宅	Andong, North Gyeongsang	1984-1-14, 1984-1-10 renamed, 2017-2-28 renamed	
186		Ildu Historic House, Hamyang 함양 일두 고택 咸陽 一蠹 古宅	Hamyang County, South Gyeongsang	1984-1-14	
187		Tug-of-war Rope of Mopo-ri 모포줄 牟浦줄	Pohang, North Gyeongsang	1984-4-17	
188		Seongeup Historic Village, Jeju 제주 성읍마을 濟州 城邑마을	Seogwipo, Jeju	1984-6-12, 2017-2-28 renamed	
189		Tug-of-war Rope of Mopo-ri 경주 양동마을 慶州 良洞마을	Gyeongju, North Gyeongsang	1984-12-24	
190		Myeongjae Historic House, Nonsan 논산 명재 고택 論山 明齋 古宅	Nonsan, South Chungcheong	1984-12-24	
191		Historic House in Ochu-ri, Yesan 예산 오추리 고택 禮山 梧楸里 古宅	Yesan County, South Chungcheong	1984-12-24, 2017-2-28 renamed	
192		Historic House of the Yeoheung Min Clan, Buyeo 부여 여흥민씨 고택 扶餘 驪興閔氏 古宅	Buyeo County, South Chungcheong	1984-12-24, 2017-2-28 renamed	
193		Historic house in Gunsu-ri, Buyeo 부여 군수리 고택 扶餘 軍守里 古宅	Buyeo County, South Chungcheong	1984-12-24, 2017-2-28 renamed	
194		Yonggungdaek House, Asan 아산 용궁댁 牙山 龍宮宅	Asan, South Chungcheong	1984-12-24, 2017-2-28 renamed	
195		Champandaek House in Oeam Village, Asan 아산 외암마을 참판댁 牙山 外岩마을 參判宅	Asan, South Chungcheong	1984-12-24, 2017-2-28 renamed	
196		Birthplace of President Yun Bo-seon, Asan 아산 윤보선 대통령 생가 牙山 尹潽善 大統領 生家	Asan, South Chungcheong	1984-12-24, 2017-2-28 renamed	
197		Yi Ha-bok's Historic House, Seocheon 서천 이하복 고택 舒川 李夏馥 古宅	Seocheon County, South Chungcheong	1984-12-24, 2017-2-28 renamed	
198		Myeongjae Historic House, Nonsan 홍성 사운 고택 洪城 士雲 古宅	Hongseong County, South Chungcheong	1984-12-24	
199		Historic House of Gyeongju Gim Clan, Seosan 서산 경주김씨 고택 瑞山 慶州金氏 古宅	Seosan, South Chungcheong	1984-12-24, 2017-2-28 renamed	
200		Jo Gil-bang's Historic House, Dalseong 달성 조길방 고택 達城 趙吉芳 古宅	Dalseong County, Daegu	1984-12-24, 2017-2-28 renamed	
201		Head House of the Chogangong Branch of the Yecheon Gwon Clan, Yecheon 예천 예천권씨 초간공파 종택 醴泉 醴泉權氏 草澗公派 宗宅	Yecheon County, North Gyeongsang	1984-12-24, 2017-2-28 renamed	
202		Gwon Seong-baek's Historic House, Andong 안동 권성백 고택 安東 權成伯 古宅	Andong, North Gyeongsang	1984-12-24	
203		Songso Head House, Andong 안동 송소종택 安東 松巢宗宅	Andong, North Gyeongsang	1984-12-24	
204		Sodeungjaesa Ritual House of the Andong Gwon Clan, Andong 안동 안동권씨 소등재사 安東 安東權氏 所等齋舍	Andong, North Gyeongsang	1984-12-24, 2017-2-28 renamed	
205		Donggye Head House, Geochang 거창 동계 종택 居昌 桐溪 宗宅	Geochang County, South Gyeongsang	1984-12-24	
206		Mugwa Historic House, Hapcheon 합천 묵와 고택 陜川 默窩 古宅	Hapcheon County, South Gyeongsang	1984-12-24, 2017-2-28 renamed	
207		Heo Sam-dul's Historic House, Hamyang 함양 허삼둘 고택 咸陽 許三둘 古宅	Hamyang County, South Gyeongsang	1984-12-24, 2017-2-28 renamed	
208		Mugiyeondang Pond, Haman 함안 무기연당 咸安 舞沂蓮塘	Haman County, South Gyeongsang	1984-12-24	
209		Clothes Excavated from the Tomb of Kim Ham 김함의 묘 출토의복 金涵의 墓 出土衣服	Dankook University Seokjujeon Memorial Museum, Yongin, Gyeonggi	1987-2-12	
210		Quilted Jacket Worn by King Gojong 고종의 누비저고리 高宗의 누비저고리	Dankook University Seokjujeon Memorial Museum, Yongin, Gyeonggi	1987-2-12	
211		Clothes Worn by Princess Deokon 덕온공주 의복 德溫公主 衣服	Dankook University Seokjujeon Memorial Museum, Yongin, Gyeonggi	1987-2-12	
212		Artifacts Used by Princess Deokon 덕온공주 유물 德溫公主 遺物	Dankook University Seokjujeon Memorial Museum, Yongin, Gyeonggi	1987-2-12	
213		Semi-formal Jacket Worn by a Court Lady 항아당의 姮娥唐衣	Dankook University Seokjujeon Memorial Museum, Yongin, Gyeonggi	1987-3-9	
214		Ceremonial Robe Worn by Heungseon Daewongun 흥선대원군 자적 단령 興宣大院君 紫赤 團領	Dankook University Seokjujeon Memorial Museum, Yongin, Gyeonggi	1987-3-9	
215		Semi-formal Jacket Worn by King Gwanghaegun’s Queen Consort 광해군비 당의 光海君妃 唐衣	Dankook University Seokjujeon Memorial Museum, Yongin, Gyeonggi	1987-3-9	
216		Artifacts Used by Yun Yong-gu 윤용구 유물 尹用求 遺物	Dankook University Seokjujeon Memorial Museum, Yongin, Gyeonggi	1987-3-9	
217		Clothes Excavated from the Tombs of the Andong Kim Clan 안동김씨 묘 출토의복 安東金氏 墓 出土衣服	Cheongju, North Chungcheong	1987-11-23	
218		Artifacts Used by Jeong On and His Family 정온 가의 유품 鄭蘊 家의 遺品	Geochang Museum, Geochang County, South Gyeongsang	1987-11-23	
219		Woman's Ornamental Jacket Worn During the Reign of King Sejo 세조대의 회장저고리 世祖代의 回裝赤古里	Woljeongsa, Pyeongchang County, Gangwon	1987-11-23	
220		Full Dress Worn by King Yeongjo 영조대왕의 도포 英祖大王의 道袍	Dong District, Daegu	1987-11-23	
221		Shingled House of Daei-ri, Samcheok 삼척 대이리 너와집 三陟 大耳里 너와집	Samcheok, Gangwon	1989-3-10	
222		Water Mill of Daei-ri, Samcheok 삼척 대이리통방아 三陟 大耳里 통방아	Samcheok, Gangwon	1989-3-7	
223		House with an Oak Bark Roof in Daei-ri, Samcheok 삼척 대이리 굴피집 三陟 大耳里 굴피집	Samcheok, Gangwon	1989-3-10	
224		Guardian Post of Yeondeung-dong, Yeosu 여수 연등동 벅수 麗水 蓮燈洞 벅수	Yeosu, South Jeolla	1990-10-10	
225		Artifacts Used by Maeng Sa-seong (Presumed) 전세 맹고불 유물 傳世 孟古佛 遺物	Buyeo County, South Chungcheong	1990-10-10	
226		Takcheongjeong Pavilion, Andong 안동 탁청정 安東 濯淸亭	Andong, North Gyeongsang	1991-8-26, 2017-2-28 renamed	
227		Hujodang Head House, Andong 안동 후조당 종택 安東 後彫堂 宗宅	Andong, North Gyeongsang	1991-8-26, 2017-2-28 renamed	
228		Cheonjedan Altar on Taebaeksan Mountain 태백산 천제단 太白山 天祭壇	Taebaek, Gangwon	1991-10-23	
229		Artifacts Excavated from the Tomb of Lady Ha 진주하씨 묘 출토유물 晉州河氏 墓 出土遺物	Daegu National Museum, Suseong District, Daegu	1993-7-20	
230		Bier Belonging to the Goryeongdaek House of the Jeonju Choe Clan, Sancheong 산청 전주최씨 고령댁 상여 山淸 全州崔氏 古靈宅 喪輿	National Folk Museum of Korea, Seoul	1996-2-9	
231		Historic House in Noeun-ri, Hongseong 홍성 노은리 고택 洪城 魯恩里 古宅	Hongseong County, South Chungcheong	1996-2-13, 2017-2-28 renamed	
232		Gongjae Historic House, Haenam 해남 공재 고택 海南 恭齋 古宅	Haenam County, South Jeolla	1996-2-13, 2017-2-28 renamed	
233		Geonjae Historic House in Oeam Village, Asan 아산 외암마을 건재 고택 牙山 外岩마을 建齋 古宅	Asan, South Chungcheong	1998-1-5, 2017-2-28 renamed	
234		Maegandang Historic House, Yeonggwang 영광 매간당 종택 靈光 梅磵堂 古宅	Yeonggwang County, South Jeolla	1998-1-5, 2017-2-28 renamed	
235		Wanggok Village, Goseong 고성 왕곡마을 高城 旺谷마을	Goseong County, Gangwon	2000-1-7	
236		Oeam Village, Asan 아산 외암마을 牙山 外巖마을	Asan, South Chungcheong	2000-1-7	
237		Soudang Historic House, Uiseong 의성 소우당 고택 義城素 宇堂 古宅	Uiseong County, North Gyeongsang	2000-1-7, 2017-2-28 renamed	
238		Hanging Board with a Record of Serving the Tutelary Deity, Sunchang 순창 성황대신 사적 현판 淳昌 城隍大神 事跡 懸板	Sunchang County, North Jeolla	2000-1-13	
239		Artifacts Excavated from the Tomb of Go Un 고운 묘 출토유물 高雲 墓 出土遺物	Gwangju History & Folk Museum, Gwangju	2001-6-26	
240		Paintings of Shamanistic Spirits in Naewatdang Shrine, Jeju-do 제주도 내왓당 무신도 濟州道 川外堂 巫神圖	Jeju City, Jeju	2001-11-30	
241		Artifacts Used by Jang Yeong-jik 장영직 유품 張榮稷 遺品	National Folk Museum of Korea, Seoul	2001-11-30	
242		Artifacts Excavated from the Tomb of Kim Heum-jo and His Wife 김흠조 부부 묘 출토유물 金欽祖 夫婦 墓 出土遺物	Yeongju, North Gyeongsang	2002-7-18	
243		Clothes Excavated from the Tomb of Yi Eon-chung 이언충 묘 출토복식 李彦忠 墓 出土服飾	Dankook University Seokjujeon Memorial Museum, Yongin, Gyeonggi	2002-7-18	
244		Monk's Outer Vestment and Mantle at Seonamsa Temple 선암사 소장 가사·탁의 仙巖寺 所藏 袈裟·卓衣	Seonamsa, Suncheon, South Jeolla	2003-12-23	
245		Ullim Historic House, Cheongdo 청도 운림 고택 淸道 雲林 古宅	Cheongdo County, North Gyeongsang	2005-1-31, 2017-2-28 renamed	
246		Clothes Excavated from the Tomb of General Yi Eung-hae 이응해장군 묘 출토복식 李應獬將軍 墓 出土服飾	Chungju Museum, Chungju, North Chungcheong	2006-9-15	
247		Three-bay House with "Magpie Holes" on the Roof in Seolmae-ri, Bonghwa 봉화 설매리 3겹 까치구멍집 奉化 雪梅里 3겹 까치구멍집	Bonghwa County, North Gyeongsang	2007-1-12	
248		Namak Head House, Yecheon 예천 남악 종택 醴泉 南嶽 宗宅	Yecheon County, North Gyeongsang	2007-1-12, 2017-2-28 renamed	
249		Songseokheon Historic House, Bonghwa 봉화 송석헌 고택 奉化 松石軒 古宅	Bonghwa County, North Gyeongsang	2007-10-12, 2017-2-28 renamed	
250		Songso Historic House, Cheongsong 청송 송소 고택 靑松 松韶 古宅	Cheongsong County, North Gyeongsang	2007-10-12, 2017-2-28 renamed	
251		Gim Hwan-gi's Historic House, Sinan 신안 김환기 고택 新安 金煥基 古宅	Sinan County, South Jeolla	2007-10-12, 2017-2-28 renamed	
252		Birthplace of Yeongnang, Gangjin 강진 영랑생가 康津 永郞生家	Gangjin County, South Jeolla	2007-10-12	
253		Clothes and Artifacts Excavated from the Tomb of General Choe Won-rip, Yeongam 영암 최원립장군 묘 출토복식·유물 靈巖 崔元立將軍 墓 出土服飾·遺物	Seodaemun District, Seoul	2007-10-16	
254		Clothes Excavated from the Tomb of Lady Sin, Mungyeong 문경 평산신씨 묘 출토복식 聞慶 平山申氏 墓 出土服飾	Museum of Old Roads, Mungyeong, North Gyeongsang	2007-10-16	
255		Hangae Village, Seongju 성주 한개마을 星州 한개마을	Seongju County, North Gyeongsang	2007-12-31	
256		Wooden Shingles and Thatched Roof Tumakjip Houses in Na-ri, Ulleung 울릉 나리 너와 투막집과 억새 투막집 鬱陵 羅里 너와 투막집과 억새 투막집	Ulleung County, North Gyeongsang	2007-12-31, 2017-2-28 renamed	
257		Thatched Roof Tumakjip House in Na-ri, Ulleung 울릉 나리 억새 투막집 鬱陵 羅里 억새 투막집	Ulleung County, North Gyeongsang	2007-12-31, 2017-2-28 renamed	
258		Geumseongdang Shrine, Seoul 서울 금성당 서울 錦城堂	Eunpyeong District, Seoul	2008-7-22, 2017-2-28 renamed	
259		Clothes Excavated from the Tombs of Choe Jin and His Family, Mungyeong 문경 최진 일가 묘 출토복식 聞慶 崔縝 一家 墓 出土服飾	Museum of Old Roads, Mungyeong, North Gyeongsang	2009-4-16	
260		Okcheonjaesa Ritual House of the Andong Gwon Clan, Yeongdeok 영덕 안동권씨 옥천재사 盈德 安東權氏 玉川齋舍	Yeongdeok County, North Gyeongsang	2009-4-28, 2017-2-28 renamed	
261		Baekbulam Historic House, Daegu 대구 백불암 고택 大邱 百弗庵 古宅	Dong District, Daegu	2009-6-19, 2017-2-28 renamed	
262		Goeheon Historic House, Yeongju 영주 괴헌고택 榮州 槐軒古宅	Yeongju, North Gyeongsang	2009-10-30	
263		Nampa Historic House, Naju 나주 남파고택 羅州 南坡古宅	Naju, South Jeolla	2009-12-17	
264		Artifacts Excavated from the Tomb of Byeon Su 변수 묘 출토유물 邊脩 墓 出土遺物	Jongno District, Seoul	2009-12-17	
265		Clothes and Accessories Worn by King Yeongchin and His Family 영친왕 일가 복식 및 장신구류 英親王 一家 服飾 및 裝身具類	Jongno District, Seoul	2009-12-17	
266		Storage Hut for Funeral Trappings in Gyeongsan, and Related Documents 경산 상엿집 및 관련문서 慶山 喪輿집 및 關聯文書	Gyeongsan, North Gyeongsang	2010-8-30, 2017-2-28 renamed	
267		Gwibong Head House, Andong 안동 귀봉종택 安東 龜峰宗宅	Andong, North Gyeongsang	2011-11-9	
268		Beonnam Historic House, Andong 안동 번남 고택 安東 樊南 古宅	Andong, North Gyeongsang	2011-11-9, 2017-2-28 renamed	
269		Sinwa Historic House, Jangheung 장흥 신와고택 長興 新窩古宅	Jangheung County, South Jeolla	2012-4-13	
270		Oheon Historic House, Jangheung 장흥 오헌고택 長興 梧軒古宅	Jangheung County, South Jeolla	2012-4-13	
271		Nango Head House, Yeongdeok 영덕 난고 종택 盈德 蘭皐 宗宅	Yeongdeok County, North Gyeongsang	2012-4-13, 2017-2-28 renamed	
272		Head House of the Takcheongjeong Branch of the Gwangsan Kim Clan, Andong 안동 광산김씨 탁청정공파 종택 安東 光山金氏 濯淸亭公派 宗宅	Andong, North Gyeongsang	2012-8-24	
273		Baegilheon Head House, Nonsan 논산 백일헌 종택 論山 白日軒 宗宅	Nonsan, North Chungcheong	2012-10-26	
274		Crown Worn by King Ui 의왕 원유관 義王 遠遊冠	Oryundae Korean Martyrs Museum, Geumjeong District, Busan	2013-6-14	
275		Stone Guardian Post of Bangchon-ri, Jangheung 장흥 방촌리 석장승 長興 傍村里 石長栍	Jangheung County, South Jeolla	2013-6-14	
276		Artifacts Excavated from the Tombs of Prince Uiwon and His Family 의원군 이혁 일가 묘 출토유물 義原君 李爀 一家 墓 出土遺物	Gyeonggi Province Museum, Yongin, Gyeonggi Province	2013-8-22	
277		Red-lacquered Furniture with Inlaid Mother-of-pearl Design Used by Empress Sunjeonghyo (Presumed) 전 순정효황후 주칠 나전가구 傳 純貞孝皇后 朱漆 螺鈿家具	Seokdang Museum of Dong-A University, Seo District, Busan	2013-8-22	
278		Museom Village, Yeongju 영주 무섬마을 榮州 무섬마을	Yeongju, North Gyeongsang	2013-8-23	
279		Mansan Historic House, Bonghwa 봉화 만산고택 奉化 晩山古宅	Bonghwa County, North Gyeongsang	2013-12-12	
280		Hyangsan Historic House, Andong 안동 향산 고택 安東 響山 故宅	Andong, North Gyeongsang	2014-2-25, 2017-2-28 renamed	
281		Sudang Historic House, Yesan 예산 수당고택 禮山 修堂古宅	Yesan County, South Chungcheong	2014-2-25	
282-1		Head House of Pansa Branch of the Pyeongsan Sin Clan 평산신씨 판사공파 종택 平山申氏 判事公派 宗宅	Cheongsong County, North Gyeongsang	2014-6-19	
282-2		Seobyeok Historic House 서벽 고택 棲碧古宅	Cheongsong County, North Gyeongsang	2014-6-19	
282-3		Sanam Historic House 사남 고택 泗南 古宅	Cheongsong County, North Gyeongsang	2014-6-19	
283		i Seo’s Geomung 옥동금 玉洞琴	Seongho Museum, Ansan, Gyeonggi Province	2014-10-22	
284		Heobackdang Head House, Andong 안동 허백당 종택 安東 虛白當 宗宅	Andong, North Gyeongsang	2015-8-21, 2017-2-28 renamed	
285		Huiijaesa Ritual House of Hamyang Bak Clan, Yecheon 예천 함양박씨 희이재사 醴泉 咸陽朴氏 希夷齋舍	Yecheon County, North Gyeongsang	2015-8-21, 2017-2-28 renamed	
286		Head House of Mueuigongpa Branch of MuanPark Clan in Yeongdeok 영덕 무안박씨 무의공파 종택 盈德 務安朴氏 武毅公派 宗宅	Yeongdeok County, North Gyeongsang	2016-4-27	
287		Sieun House of Andong 안동 시은고택 安東 市隱古宅	Andong, North Gyeongsang	2016-4-27	
288		Geumgyejaesa Shrine of Pungsan Ryu Clan in Andong 안동 풍산류씨 금계재사 安東 豊山柳氏 金溪齋舍	Andong, North Gyeongsang	2016-7-1	
289		Dongchundang Head House, Daejeon 대전 동춘당 종택 大田 同春堂 宗宅	Daedeok District, Daejeon	2016-8-26	
290		Sodaeheon․HoyeonJae's Historic House, Daejeon 대전 소대헌·호연재 고택 大田 小大軒‧浩然齋 古宅	Daedeok District, Daejeon	2016-8-26	
291		Head House of Jinseong Yi Clan in Andong 안동 진성이씨 종택 安東 眞城李氏 宗宅	Andong, North Gyeongsang	2017-6-29	
292		Bindongjaesa Ritual House of the SeonseongGim Clan, Bonghwa 봉화 선성김씨 빈동재사 奉化 宣城金氏 賓洞齋舍	Bonghwa County, North Gyeongsang	2017-6-29	
293		Seoseoldang House of Bonghwa 봉화 서설당 고택 奉花 瑞雪堂 古宅	Bonghwa County, North Gyeongsang	2017-8-25	
294		Sawol Head House of the Hanyang Jo Clan, Yeongyan 영양 한양조씨 사월 종택 英陽 漢陽趙氏 沙月宗宅	Yeongyang County, North Gyeongsang	2017-12-29	
295		Head House of Onhye Branch of Jinseong Lee Clan, Andong 안동 진성이씨 온혜파 종택 安東 眞城李氏 溫惠派 宗宅	Andong, North Gyeongsang	2018-11-1	
296		Ubok Head House, Sangju 상주 우복 종택 尙州 愚伏 宗宅	Sangju, North Gyeongsang	2018-11-1	
297		Kim Byeong sun's old house, Iksan 익산 김병순 고택 益山 金炳順 古宅	Iksan, North Jeolla	2019-3-11	
298		봉화 오고당 고택 (奉化 五高堂 古宅)	Bonghwa County, North Gyeongsang	2020-11-9	
299		안동 영양남씨 남흥재사 (安東 英陽南氏 南興齋舍)	Andong, North Gyeongsang	2020-12-21	
300		오산 구성이씨·여흥이씨 묘 출토복식 (烏山 駒城李氏·驪興李氏 墓 出土服飾)	Suwon Museum, Suwon, Gyeonggi	2021-6-2	
301		영덕 괴시마을 (盈德 槐市마을)	Yeongdeok County, North Gyeongsang	2021-6-21	
