= Julia Mullock =

American in the Korean Royal Family (1927–2017)

- Yi and Mullock in 1963
- Born: March 18, 1923; Philadelphia, Pennsylvania, United States of America
- Died: November 26, 2017 (aged 94); Honolulu, Hawaiʻi, United States of America
- Burial: Ashes scattered in the Pacific Ocean
- Spouse: Yi Gu, Prince Imperial Hoieun (m. 1959; div. 1982)
- Issue: Princess Yi Eugenia Eun-suk
- House: House of Yi (by marriage)
- Religion: Catholic

Korean name
- Hangul: 이주아
- Hanja: 李珠亞
- RR: I Jua
- MR: I Chua

Julia Mullock (March 18, 1923 – November 26, 2017) was an American member of the former imperial family of Korea through her marriage to Yi Ku.

However, her status within the imperial family is disputed as the two were not married in accordance with Korean customs. Thus, Mullock was not included in the Yi household register.

== Biography ==
=== Early life and career ===
Julia Mullock was born in Philadelphia, Pennsylvania, in the United States, to a Ukrainian American family. Her parents, Wasyl and Annie Mulock, were from Ukraine; at the time, the area was under Austria-Hungary and Poland.

Her father immigrated to the United States between 1904 to 1909, and her mother immigrated between 1910 to 1914. They married in 1914 and the couple eventually had four children. In 1920, the Mullock family lived in Schuylkill, Pennsylvania, and in 1923, Julia joined the family as the third daughter and youngest child.

When her father Wasyl started working as a coal miner, they moved in 1930 to Minersville, Pennsylvania. In 1935, Mullock’s father died while working when she was twelve years old. Mullock’s mother eventually remarried a man from Brooklyn, New York City, and moved there afterwards.

After serving in the Navy in 1944, Julia entered Franklin College of Professional Art and Design where she studied art, architecture, and interior design.

In 1955, she had a job in the firm of architect IM Pei, which Prince Gu joined after graduating from MIT with an architecture degree. Tired of her work at IM Pei, she left for Spain to study art again.

Mullock had taped an advertisement for her apartment on the notice board of her office, which Prince Gu saw. He visited her apartment, and instead of purchasing it, he persuaded Mullock to stay in the United States. Mullock is said to have been “deeply moved” by Prince Gu when he clumsily spoke some Ukrainian phrases in an attempt to impress her.

She described their encounter: “He didn’t propose. He declared it unilaterally. ‘We are going to get married.’ That was all, it wasn’t ‘Will you marry me.’ “It wasn’t like getting down on one knee and proposing in the American way or running to my parents to ask for permission to marry me.”

=== Marriage to Prince Gu ===
Later in December 1957, Prince Gu asked her, “There is someone I really need to see. Would you please meet them with me?”. He brought Julia to his parents, Crown Prince Yi Eun and Princess Yi Bangja, who at the time were visiting the United States.

In May 1958, Mullock and Prince Gu were engaged, and they married at the Ukrainian Catholic St George's Church in New York City on October 25, 1959, when Mullock was 27 years old. It was until this time that Prince Gu did not reveal his identity as a member of the Korean Imperial Household, but is said to have been living an ordinary newlywed life with Mullock in Brooklyn.

The couple later moved to Hawaiʻi, but in 1963, Mullock moved to Korea with her husband where she gained Korean citizenship. Her Korean name was Yi Ju-ah.

Mullock and Prince Gu moved into apartments at Changdeok Palace where she received the title of Grand Heir Consort Hoieun (회은황태손빈).

As a member of the Korean Imperial Household, Mullock devoted her time to helping her mother-in-law with imperial welfare work at Nakseonjae in Changdeok Palace, and doing charitable endeavors in her new homeland.

Mullock opened a clothing store whilst in Korea to help finance her charitable endeavors. This was a time which Mullock called "the happiest times of my life". A cousin-in-law of Mullock said “Mullock fulfilled her duty as a princess of Korea’s last royal family, helping the needy and poor, particularly the handicapped people." Mullock continued her charitable activities for many years after the end of her marriage.

Though unable to have children with Prince Gu, Mullock and her husband in 1969 adopted a daughter, Yi Eun-suk (Eugenia), who was born in 1959 in Seoul. Yi Eun-suk was never formally recognized by the Yi Family Council and therefore her membership in the Korean Imperial Household is disputed.

In 1979, due to the failure of her business in Korea, she left for Japan. Her relationship with the Crown Prince deteriorated and she came into severe conflict with her relatives who complained that she had no heir.

=== Divorce and later life ===
Prince Gu divorced Mullock in 1982 under pressure from the imperial family, as she had produced no heir. Mullock’s status in the Korean Imperial Household became disputed following her discovery of her exclusion from the register of the Yi Family Council. This became known to her during the process of finalising her divorce from Prince Gu in the United States.

She took their adoptive daughter Eugenia with her, and ran her craft shop at The Plaza Hotel where she worked on her disability welfare projects until 1995, when she left Korea for Hawaiʻi.

In April 2005, she returned to Korea to produce a film based on her life, and it was when she heard the news of her ex-husband’s death. Prince Gu, who had divided his time between his work in Japan and his native Korea, died of a heart attack in 2005. She was not invited to the funeral due to their divorce 23 years earlier.

On May 1, 2005, she secretly saw off her ex-husband on his final journey, watching proceedings from afar in a wheelchair in the streets of Jongro. She attended the religious ceremonies at the Royal Ancestors' Shrine (Jongmyo Jerye) with her lady-in-waiting Gwon Hui-sun, and Princess Yi Hae-won daughter of Prince Yi Kang. This was covered a lot in articles as there are some photos taken related to the funeral of the Grand Heir at the time.

On November 26, 2017, Mullock died of old age at Hale Nani Rehabilitation and Nursing Center in Honolulu, Hawaiʻi, but it was only on December 5 when the news reached the Korean public. Mullock is survived by her adoptive daughter, Yi Eugenia Eun-suk, who helped conduct the funeral and spread her mother’s ashes in the Pacific Ocean and continues to live in Hawaiʻi.

== Family ==
- Father - Wasyl Mulock (1886 - 30 Sep 1935)
- Stepfather - Harvey Winslow (12 March 1887 - 5 October 1956)
- Mother - Annie Mulock (1897–?)
- Siblings
  - Older sister - Annie Mullock (1914–?)
  - Older brother - Milse Mullock (1917–?)
  - Older sister - Irma Mullock (1918–?)
  - Older brother - Joseph Charles Mullock (1919–2001)
    - Sister-in-law - Mildred Virginia Greene (1928–2022)
- Spouse
  - Yi Gu, Prince Imperial Hoieun (회은황태손) (29 December 1931 - 16 July 2005)
    - Father-in-law - Yi Eun, Crown Prince Imperial Uimin (의민황태자 이은) (October 20, 1897 - May 1, 1970)
    - Mother-in-law - Yi Bang-ja, Crown Princess Uimin (이방자, 李方子) (November 4, 1901 - April 30, 1989)
- Issue
  - Adoptive daughter - Yi Eun-suk (이은숙, 李恩淑)/Yi Eugenia (1959)
  - Adoptive son - Yi Won (이원, 李源) or Yi Sang-hyeob (이상협) (October 21, 1966)

== In popular culture ==
- In April 2006, the Universal Studios division Focus Features announced that it would be producing a biographical film of Mullock with a working title of The Julia Project in partnership with South Korean LJ Film. In August 2006 Focus announced that Deepa Mehta had been chosen to direct the film.

== See also ==
- Rulers of Korea
- Korea under Japanese rule

Titles in pretence
Preceded by Princess Masako of Nashimoto	— TITULAR — Empress consort of Korea; 1 May 1970 – 1982; Reason for succession failure: Empire abolished by Japanese annexation 1910	Succeeded by Cho Tŭng-hak
