= Finding Dispersed Families =

1983 South Korean TV program

- Hangul: 이산가족을 찾습니다
- Hanja: 離散家族을 찾습니다
- RR: Isangajogeul chatseumnida
- MR: Isan'gajogŭl ch'assŭmnida
- Genre: Live television special
- Created by: Korean Broadcasting System
- Directed by: Park Hee-ung
- Starring: 53,536 participants
- Country of origin: South Korea
- Original language: Korean

Production
- Running time: 453 hours, 45 minutes

Original release
- Network: KBS1
- Release: June 30 – November 14, 1983

Finding Dispersed Families (Korean: 이산가족을 찾습니다) was a special live broadcast created by the Korean Broadcasting System (KBS) that aired from June 30 to November 14, 1983. The television program aimed to reunite families within South Korea that were separated following the division of Korea and the Korean War. The broadcast was initially filmed at the KBS Headquarters in Yeouido Park, Seoul. It later expanded across the nation and featured cases received from nine of KBS' regional branches.

The program was conceived by director Park Hee-ung to commemorate the 30-year anniversary of the ceasefire agreement that brought an end to the Korean War. It was initially pitched as a small segment to be featured on the morning show Studio 830 with the title I Still Haven't Found my Family. Shortly following this pitch, KBS received a large number of applications to appear on the program, causing the producers to realize the significant number of Korean families that had been dispersed by the war. As a result, KBS president Lee Won-hong granted permission for an extended special broadcast to be aired, which led to the creation of the program.

Whilst the broadcast was originally planned with a duration of 95 minutes, it ran for a total of 453 hours and 45 minutes over 138 days as KBS was inundated with requests for help to re-connect individuals with their lost family members. As a result, 53,000 people were featured on air, reuniting 10,000 families.

Finding Dispersed Families received international attention, and in 2015 was included in UNESCO's Memory of the World International Register.

== Background ==
There were two key stages in Korean history in which significant numbers of families were separated, many of whom later appeared on Finding Dispersed Families. These eras were the Liberation period (1945–1950) following the End of World War II in Asia and the Korean War period (1950–1953).

=== The Cold War ===
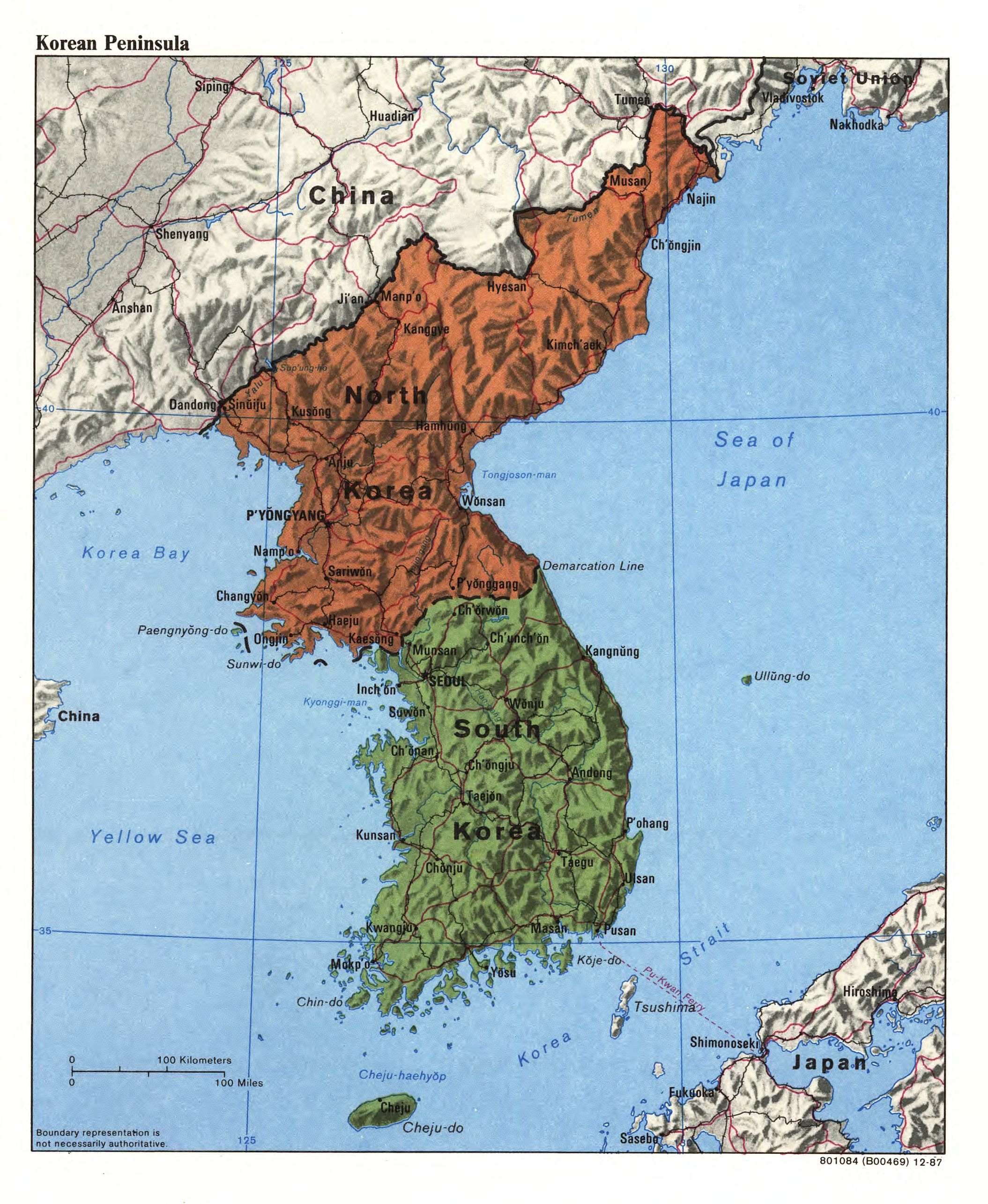
Korea's northern and southern states, divided by the Armistice Line.

The division of the Korean peninsula into the separate nations of North Korea and South Korea resulted in the separation of over 10 million families and can be viewed as a consequence of the Cold War. After Japan brought an end to the 500-year rule of the peninsula by the Joseon dynasty, Korea experienced 35 years of Japanese colonial rule. This inspired nationwide attempts at independence on March 1, 1919, which ultimately failed. As a result of these failed movements, the nation split into those who turned to the Bolshevik Revolution and Marxism for a solution and those who believed the Western powers, especially the United States, would be able to provide relief. Following Japan's defeat in 1945, the Korean peninsula split along the 38th parallel into Soviet and American zones of occupation. This division was formalized in 1948, when the Republic of Korea was established in the South below the 38th parallel through a United Nations sponsored election. As a result, there was a significant influx of North Korean refugees to the southern peninsula and families separated across the states experienced difficulties maintaining communication.

=== The Korean War ===
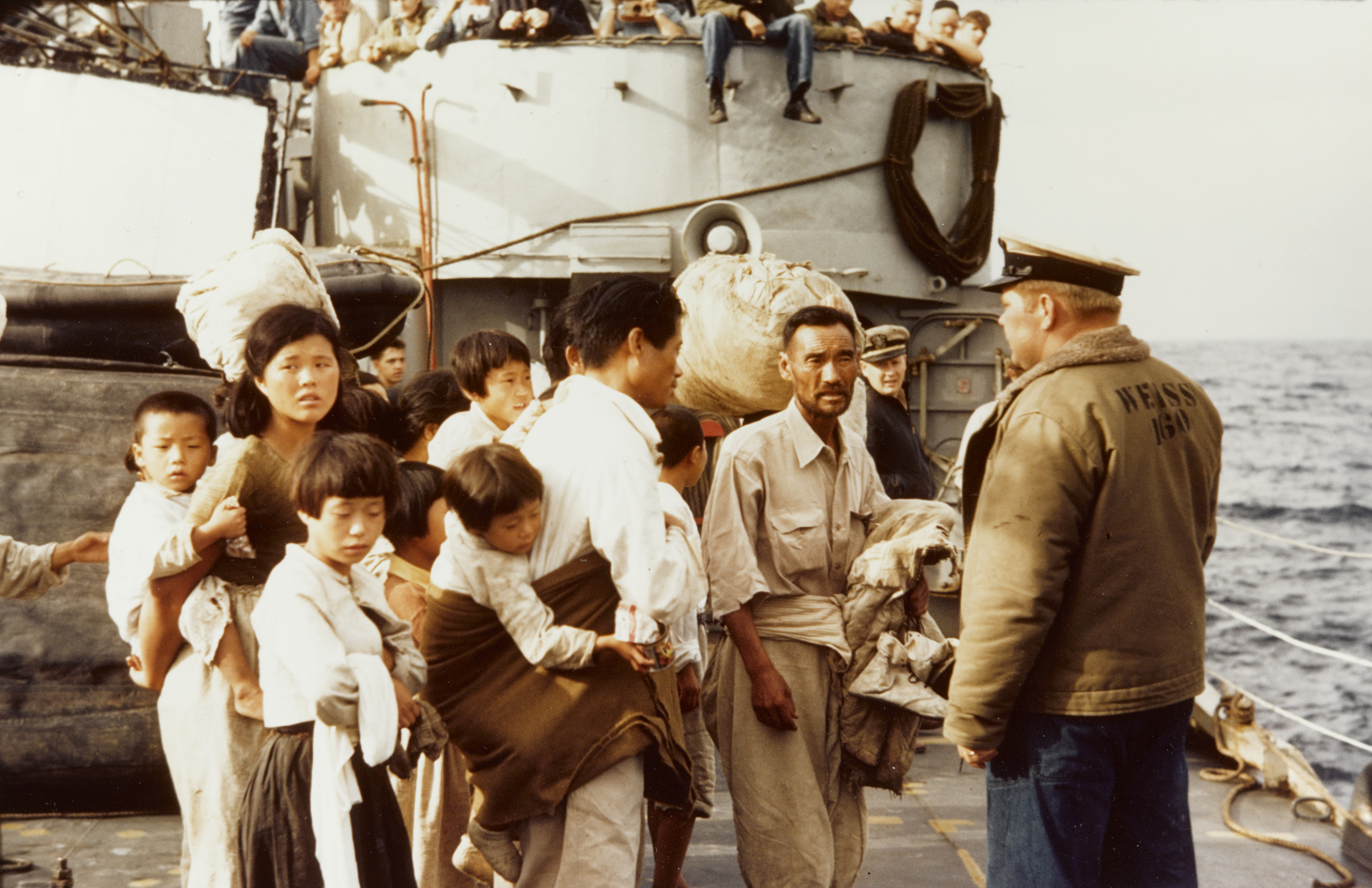
Refugees from the Korean War boarding the USS Weiss, September 16, 1952.

The Korean War further cemented the division between the north and south of the peninsula as political tensions heightened. The three-year conflict, beginning when North Korean troops entered South Korea on June 25, 1950, set the communist and capitalist forces against each other. Over the course of the war, an estimated 3–4 million people were killed, with as many as 70% of these being civilians. The issue of divided families, known as isan kajok in Korean, worsened as families were unable to communicate with those living on the other side of the Armistice Line and often experienced political injustice due to their association with the "enemy" state. To recognise the major role the Korean War played in separating families, the Finding Dispersed Families program was aired in recognition of the 33rd anniversary of the war's commencement (June 25, 1950) and the 30th anniversary of the armistice agreement (July 27, 1953).

== Production and broadcasting ==
=== Finding participants ===
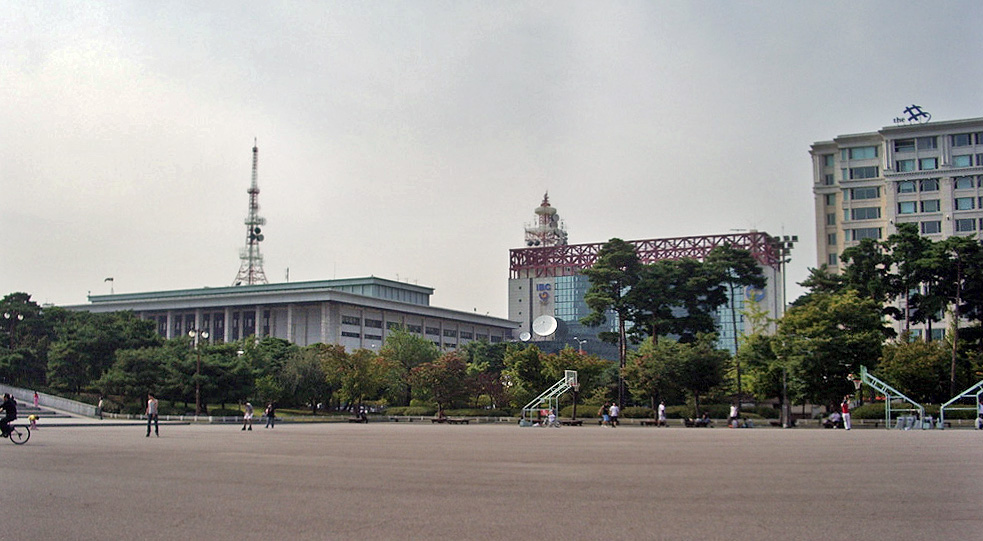
KBS Headquarters at Seoul.

Beginning on June 26, 1983, advertisements solicited applications for appearing on Finding Dispersed Families, with an original plan to air 200 stories on the program. Within two days, over 1,000 applications were received; producers decided that 850 people would be featured on the broadcast. In an attempt to increase the broadcast's success in re-connecting families, these applicants went through a series of interviews and were later assigned to four groups based on the likelihood that they would be reunited with their family. Those with the highest likelihood of reunion presented their cases first on the program. Each individual shared their case to find their missing family member by holding up a sign that featured a number and their story. On the first day of the program, 36 people were reunited with long-lost family members. Within days, the walls of the KBS building as well as neighbouring sidewalks and the Yeouido Plaza were covered with posters looking for separated relatives. Due to large crowds, the police were called to maintain order and safety amongst civilians. As the broadcast continued, the plaza remained full of citizens hoping to feature on the broadcast. Thus, a "Finding Dispersed Families Headquarters" was established at the KBS main building. The secondary part of the live broadcast began on July 1, 1983 at 10:15 p.m. KST, marking the start of the 138 days of live broadcasting that followed.

=== Production ===
At the corporate level, KBS had 1,641 broadcasting employees. Journalists from 25 nations delivered reunion news in front of the KBS lobby and KBS installed 24 television sets inside and outside the building to help Korean civilians stay up to date with the program. More than 100,952 people applied to appear on the program, and 53,536 cases were aired. Of these participants, 10,189 families were reunited. At its peak, the broadcast had a rating of 78% with 4,943,118 people watching the campaign. The broadcast ended at 4:00 a.m. KST on November 14, 1983.

== Reception ==
=== Significance ===
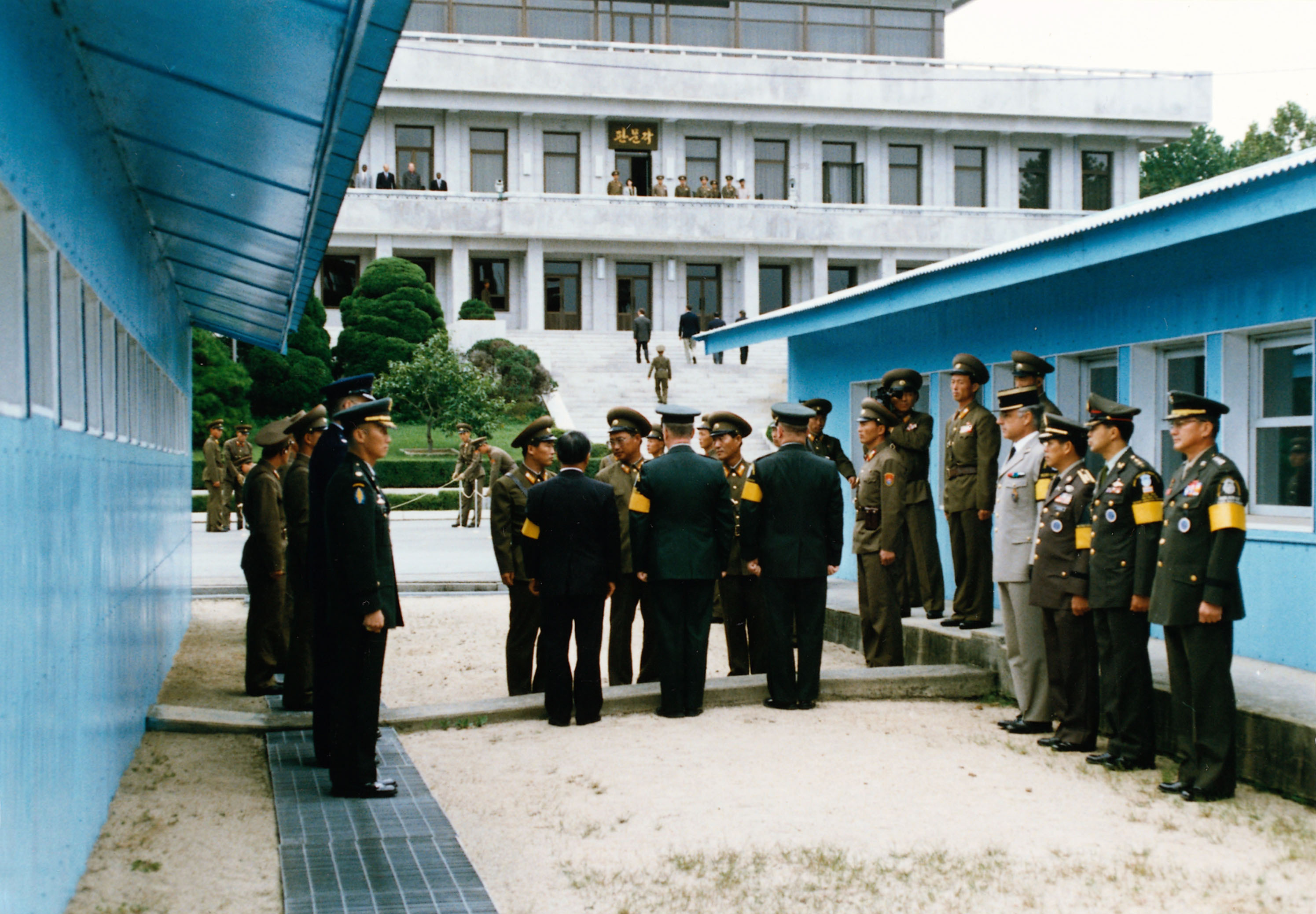
Members of North Korea meet with South Korean officials in attempts to re-open communication channels following the Cold War.

The national significance of Finding Dispersed Families can be ascertained by the impact it had on the Korean people. The television program marked the first time mass media was used to aid in the process of post-war reunification, and it maintains the greatest breadth of public participation of any Korean broadcast in history. While the program was not broadcast in North Korea, it played a role in the continued communication between the two Koreas, as South Korea used the program as a bargaining tool in their efforts to re-open discussions with the North on the issue of reuniting families across the demilitarized zone. During an address to the National Assembly in Seoul on November 12, 1983, United States president Ronald Reagan urged North Korea to participate in the program.

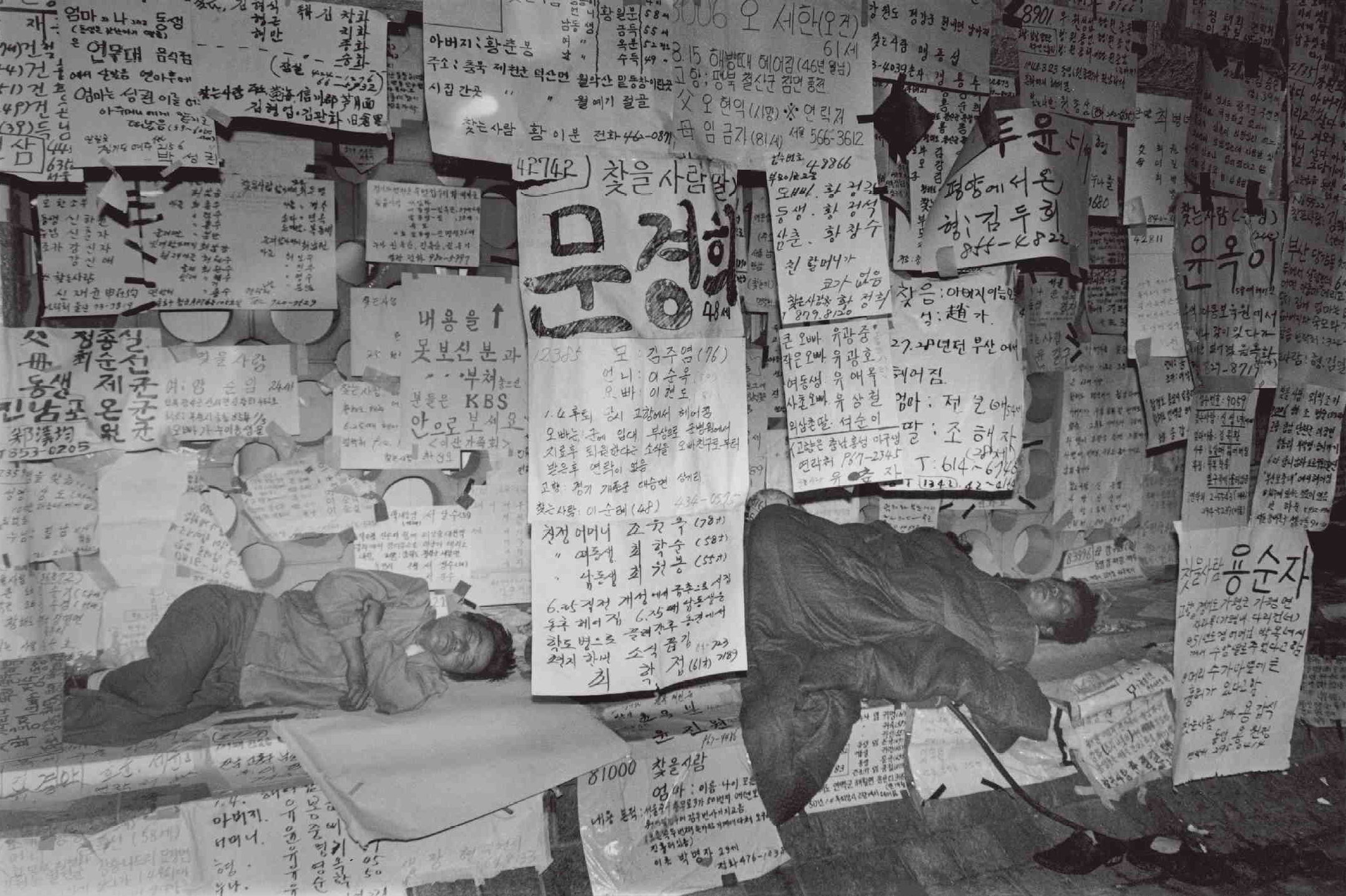
Family members sleeping outside KBS headquarters following the program's broadcast

The program also holds great global significance in publicizing the lesser-known consequences of the Cold War and Korean War. In an era when widespread access to television had only just begun, Finding Dispersed Families became one of the first vivid records of the consequences of war on civilians. The program revealed to the world the issue of national division, featuring scenes of crowds gathering outside Yeouido Plaza in an effort to find their lost family members. The raw emotions captured by the live broadcast elicited strong emotional reactions across the globe. This is reflected by U.N Secretary-General Javier Perez de Cuellar meeting with the South Korean Ambassador to the United Nations, Kim Kyoung-won, on July 21, 1983 to express his sympathy over the tragedy of the fall-out of the Korean War. The program's impact on the global community is further evidenced by the fact that it was broadcast by 25 countries in real time as well as being screened at the general assembly of the Asia-Pacific Broadcasting Union in Auckland, New Zealand in October 1983. Global politicians were also responsive to the broadcast, with 17 members from 7 countries visiting the KBS headquarters alongside the directors of the International Human Rights Commission during the 70th Assembly of the Inter-Parliamentary Union. The program was also a popular topic in International newspapers, with the New York Times writing a review of the broadcast in August 1983.

=== Airing ===
Finding Dispersed Families's continued relevance is reflected by its legacy in global history. The broadcast has received numerous awards since its airing, listed in the table below. The most noteworthy of these is the program's recognition by the UNESCO International Advisory Committee of its historical value, leading to its place in the Memory of the World Register.

Award	Year received	Location
World Congress of Journalist's Humanitarian Award	1983	Cartagena, Colombia
Gold Mercury International Honorem Award for Peace	1984	Gabon, Africa
UNESCO Memory of the World International Register	2015	Paris, France

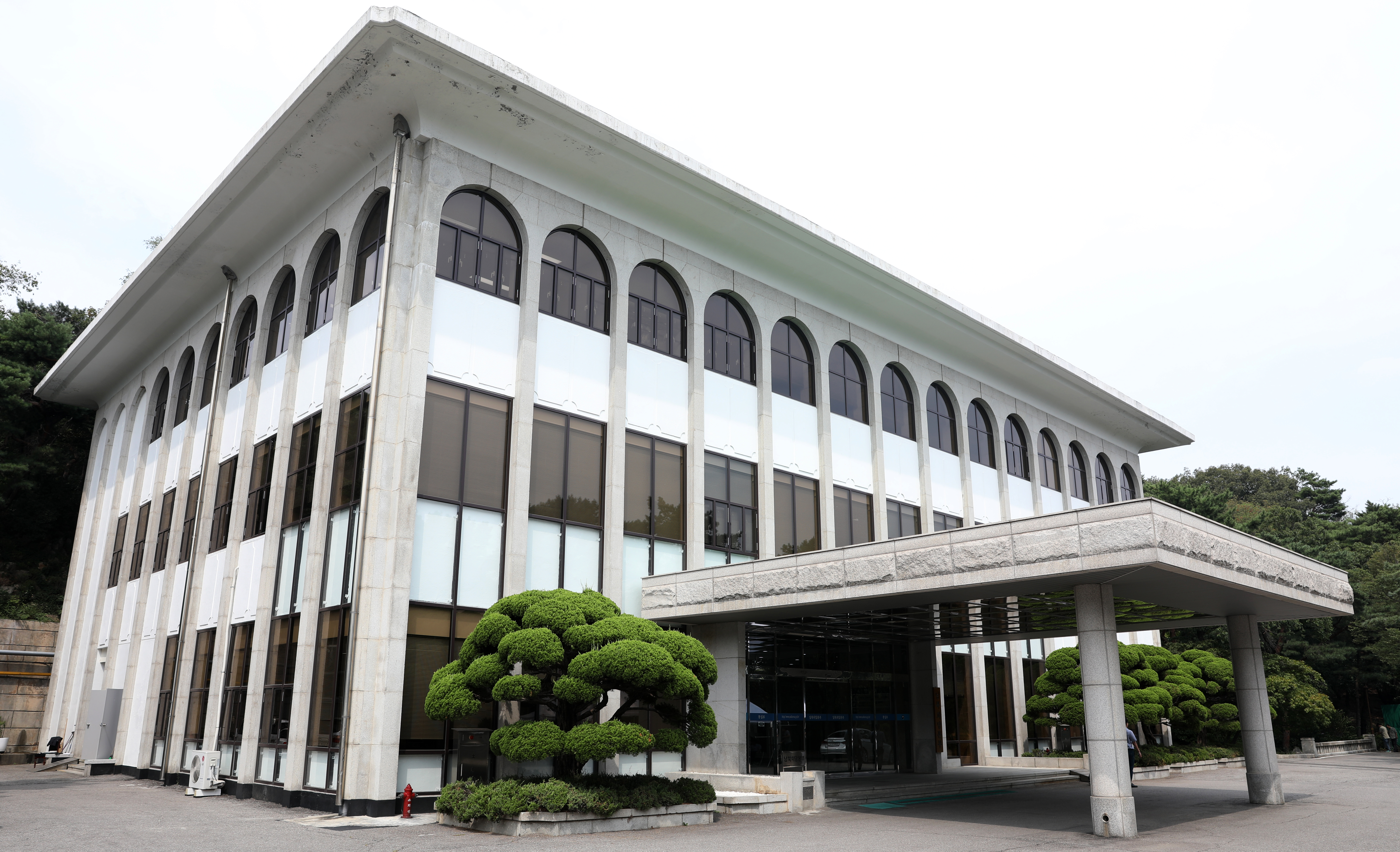
Inter-Korean family reunion press centre created by the South Korean Government to facilitate reunions between war dispersed North and South Korean citizens (August 2018).

The program's legacy is also highlighted by the reunions that have continued in North and South Korea since Finding Dispersed Families. The broadcast's success in re-uniting family members and the continued appeals by the Korean public for the opportunity to find their long-lost relatives inspired other television companies to continue KBS' efforts. This is seen through the program "Reunions of Separated Families for Sakhalin-Koreans", which aired in the 1990s. KBS also continued to involve themselves in aiding re-unions, featuring a regular segment titled "I Miss Them", on the morning show Achim Madang from 1997 to 2007. Reunion efforts continue to play an important role in North and South Korea, being predominantly driven by the Korean Red Cross and the North and South Korean Governments. The most recent of these reunion efforts was the "Inter-Korean Family Reunions", which occurred in August 2018.

== Streaming availability ==
The archives of the program are considerably detailed, including 463 videotapes featuring 453 hours and 45 minutes of live broadcast organized by date of production. The archives, however, extend past these original recordings and also include files produced by the Korean Broadcasting System relating to the planning process, including director's notes and storyboards, as well as notes on production. Further, the archives include related documents published by the South Korean Government and local council organizations as well as those published by national newspapers. In particular, the archive has collected 12 volumes of the register of names of those featured on the program produced by the Korean Red Cross as well as the music used in the program. This includes the theme song, "The Lost Thirty Years" and the background music, "Does Anyone Know This Person?". The archives also feature 15,000 photographic records, including photos of reunions taken in the studio and those commissioned by KBS.

The archives of the program are readily available to the public on the KBS website. This website allows users to stream the broadcasts as well as access a large collection of all related material, such as the stories of the participants and photographs of their reunions. More recently, a database has been created featuring the names and details of all Korean civilians featured on the program in an effort to match them to the broadcast in which they are featured, allowing for quick searches of footage using the participant's name.
