= Ichpedia =

Online encyclopedia for the intangible cultural heritage in Korea

Ichpedia is an online encyclopedia for the intangible cultural heritage in Korea and international arenas. It was created by a group of scholars and practitioners with the support of the Cultural Heritage Administration of the Republic of Korea. The ultimate goal is to enhance the significance of traditional cultures and cultural diversities.

== Description ==
The Ichpedia project began in September 2010.

The project started with a movement to create a new paradigm for safeguarding of cultural heritage in the national and international arenas. With the awareness that there are conflicts and difference between Korea's current policies and laws regarding cultural heritage protection and UNESCO's 2003 Convention, the project started with a new understanding of ICH and a new methodology of collecting data. Ichpedia is the online encyclopedia of intangible cultural heritage established on the basis of survey data. Its immediate goal is to create an exclusive record using internet surveys and taking a wiki-model based on the Web 2.0 platform. This project entails some innovations such as the utilization of a bottom-up approach, the collective intelligence, and community's active involvement. First, the online survey is used. Second, a wiki-model for collecting data and a new network system is set up. Third, the online-based networks have certain merits, including the ability to surpass barriers of time and space, as well as various divisions and partitions in the society. Ichpedia removes the walls between specialists and ordinary people, central organizations and regional ones, and between government and citizens. The ultimate goal of Ichpedia project is to increase cooperation among stakeholders for safeguarding ICH in Korea.

ICH has recently drawn international attention because of its immeasurable contributions to the enhancement of human creativity and cultural diversity. However, ICH of each country has been disappearing rapidly as modernization and industrialization processes within each country were intensified. In particular, ICH is not easy to preserve and protect from destruction due to its immaterial and formless nature. It exists in people's memory, ideas, and everyday practices. UNESCO has strenuously made efforts to establish safeguarding measures of ICH throughout the world due to distinctive characteristics of ICH. UNESCO's initiatives signify its view of ICH as the common cultural heritages of humanity. As part of such initiatives, UNESCO announced the convention for the safeguarding of the Intangible Cultural Heritage in 2003. The Convention specifies safeguarding measures additionally proclaimed by the directives of ICH and related guidelines. Of the safeguarding methods, inventories are very important ways in which the intangible heritage community members can raise awareness of their cultural heritage. According to UNESCO, the process of inventorying ICH enhances the self-respect of heritage bearers and their respective communities and enriches human creativity. The Convention encourages the involvement of state parties in creating inventories of ICH existing in their territories and providing regular updates of any existing inventories. Updating of inventories is an ongoing process that can never be fully completed. The Convention allows some flexibility for the state parties in utilizing their own methods in inventory-making.

Since the 1960s the South Korean government has made efforts to protect and preserve the Korean cultural heritages at the national level. Both legal and administrative measures have been undertaken affecting national treasures containing both tangible and intangible cultural heritages. The government's imperative to safeguard the national treasures was/is acknowledged being exemplary and draws international attention. However, since the Convention in 2003 and its operational directives have been ratified by many member states, Korea has fallen into confusion. There are some conflicts and differences between the Korea's existing system and the UNESCO's new one regarding the safeguarding measures. It is necessary to carefully consider the differences and distinctions between the two systems. Although Korea had an existing, mature system of protection and preservation of cultural heritages, it is now facing a change in its existing system. The UNESCO's initiatives have caused Korea to take stock in the safeguarding ICH.

== Policy ==
1. Data are collected through bottom-up approach
2. Collective intelligence are being promoted
3. Online network is extensively used for opening of the closed information of ICH
