= Grand Prince Ŭian (born 1382) =

Joseon prince (1382–1398)

Crown Prince of Joseon
- Tenure: 15 September 1392 – 6 October 1398
- Predecessor: None
- Successor: Crown Prince Panggwa
- Born: 1382; Gaegyeong, Goryeo
- Died: 6 October 1398 (aged 15–16); Yeongchumun, Gyeongbokgung, Hanseong, Joseon
- Burial: Ŭiandaegunmyo, Gwangju, South Korea
- Spouse: Crown Princess Yu (m. 1392; dep. 1393) Crown Princess Shim (m. 1394)
- Issue Detail: 2 sons (1 adopted son)
Names
- Yi Pangsŏk (이방석; 李芳碩)
Posthumous name
- Sodo (소도; 昭悼)
- Clan: Jeonju Yi
- Dynasty: Yi
- Father: King Taejo
- Mother: Queen Sindeok
- Religion: Buddhism → Confucianism (Neo-Confucianism)

Korean name
- Hangul: 의안대군
- Hanja: 宜安大君
- RR: Uian daegun
- MR: Ŭian taegun

Grand Prince Ŭian (Korean: 의안대군; Hanja: 宜安大君; 1382 – 6 October 1398), personal name Yi Pangsŏk, was the youngest son of King Taejo, the founder of Joseon. Through the machinations of his mother, Queen Sindeok, he was appointed as the first crown prince of Joseon at the age of 10, bypassing the adult sons born to his father's first wife. He was subsequently killed in a coup d'état orchestrated by his half-brothers who, having contributed to their father's achievements and the founding of the new dynasty, were dissatisfied with Taejo's disregard for them and excessive favor toward their stepmother and her children.

== Biography ==
=== Early life ===
Yi Pangsŏk was the younger son of Goryeo general Yi Sŏnggye and his second wife, Lady Kang. Yi Sŏnggye had two wives, both of whom were his legitimate wives. In 1392, Yi Sŏnggye founded Joseon and became its first king (posthumously King Taejo), while Lady Kang became its first queen (posthumously Queen Sindeok).

=== As crown prince ===
Yi Pangsŏk was named crown prince on 15 September 1392, one month after Joseon's founding, despite having one elder full-brother and six elder half-brothers.

In 1393, his wife, Crown Princess Yu, committed adultery with an eunuch named Yi Man (이만), which resulted in punishment for both. Crown Princess Yu was deposed and banished whereas Yi Man was beheaded. Lady Shim was chosen as Yi Pangsŏk's new wife the following year; she was the daughter of Shim Hyosaeng (심효생), a high-ranking official and ally of Chŏng Tojŏn.

On 23 September 1396, Queen Sindeok, Yi Pangsŏk's mother and strongest supporter, died.

=== First Strife of the Princes ===
In October 1398, the First Strife of the Princes took place under the leadership of Prince Chŏngan (posthumously King Taejong). Yi Pangsŏk personally led the army against Prince Chŏngan's forces stationed in front of Gwanghwamun, but refused to confront the rebels after an officer named Bong Wonryang (봉원량) reported that, "From Gwanghwamun to Namsan, the elite cavalry is fully equipped."

After the deaths of opposition figures such as Chŏng Tojŏn, Nam Ŭn (남은), Shim Hyosaeng, and Park Wi (박위), Prince Chŏngan's faction had Yi Pangsŏk replaced with Taejo's eldest surviving son, Prince Yŏngan (posthumously King Jeongjong).

Yi Pangsŏk, now the deposed crown prince, was to be exiled and left Gyeongbokgung through Yeongchumun shortly thereafter. The forces of Prince Chŏngan, including Yi Geoyi (이거이), the father-in-law of Princess Kyŏngsin (경신공주), colluded with the Supreme Council of State (도평의사사), and had Yi Pangsŏk assassinated. His elder brother, Yi Pangbon (이방번), and brother-in-law, Yi Je (이제), were also eliminated.

=== After death ===
Yi Pangsŏk was buried in Gwangju, Gyeonggi Province, and later received the posthumous name Sodo (소도).

In 1680, King Sukjong honored Yi Pangsŏk and Yi Pangbon as Grand Prince Ŭian (의안대군) and Grand Prince Muan (무안대군), respectively.

== Family ==
- Father: King Taejo (태조대왕; 4 November 1335 – 27 June 1408)
  - Grandfather: Yi Chach'un (이자춘), King Hwanjo (환조대왕; 1315 – 3 May 1360)
  - Grandmother: Queen Ŭihye (의혜왕후), of the Yeongheung Ch'oe clan (영흥 최씨; ?–1336)
- Mother: Queen Sindeok (신덕왕후), of the Goksan Kang clan (곡산 강씨; 20 July 1356 – 23 September 1396)
  - Grandfather: Kang Yunsŏng (강윤성), Internal Prince Sangsan (상산부원군; ?–1358)
  - Grandmother: Internal Princess Consort Jinsan (진산부부인), of the Jinju Kang clan (진주 강씨)
- Stepmother: Queen Sinŭi (신의왕후), of the Cheongju Han clan (청주 한씨; 6 October 1337 – 25 November 1391)

Consort(s) and their respective issue

- Deposed Crown Princess (폐빈), of the Yu clan (유씨)
- Crown Princess (왕세자빈), of the Buyu Shim clan (부유 심씨; ?–1448) (Note: Known as Grand Princess Consort of Samhan State (삼한국대부인) following the death of her husband.) (Note: Daughter of Shim Hyosaeng (심효생), Prince Buseong (부성군; 1349–1398).)
  - Unnamed son (1398–?)
  - Yi Yu (이유), Grand Prince Geumseong (금성대군; 14 May 1526 – 16 November 1457), adopted son (Note: The seventh son of King Sejong.)

== Ancestry ==
Ancestors of Grand Prince Ŭian (born 1382)

Yi Haengni, King Ikjo (익조대왕 이행리)
Yi Ch'un, King Dojo (도조대왕 이춘)
Queen Jeongsuk, of the Yeongheung Ch'oe clan (정숙왕후 영흥 최씨)
Yi Chach'un, King Hwanjo (환조대왕 이자춘)
Park Kwang, Internal Prince Anbyŏn (안변부원군 박광)
Queen Kyŏngsun, of the Munju Park clan (경순왕후 문주 박씨)
King Taejo (태조대왕)
Ch'oe Chongdae (최종대)
Ch'oe Hangi, Internal Prince Yŏnghŭng (영흥부원군 최한기)
Lady, of the Kim clan (김씨)
Queen Ŭihye, of the Yeongheung Ch'oe clan (의혜왕후 영흥 최씨)
Grand Princess Consort of Joseon State, of the Yi clan (조선국대부인 이씨)
Grand Prince Ŭian
Kang Suk-jae (강숙재)
Kang Seo (강서)
Kang Yunsŏng, Internal Prince Sangsan (상산부원군 강윤성)
Lady, of the Jangsu Hwang clan (장수 황씨)
Queen Sindeok, of the Goksan Kang clan (신덕왕후 곡산 강씨)
Kang Eun (강은)
Internal Princess Consort Jinsan, of the Jinju Kang clan (진산부부인 진주 강씨)

== In popular culture ==
- Portrayed by Yang Hee-seok in the 1996–1998 KBS1 TV series Tears of the Dragon.
- Portrayed by Park Joon-mok in the 2014 KBS1 TV series Jeong Do-jeon.
- Portrayed by Lee Seung-woo and Jung Yoon-seok in the 2015–2016 SBS TV series Six Flying Dragons.
- Portrayed by Kim Min-ho and Lee Hyo-je in the 2019 JTBC TV series My Country: The New Age.
- Portrayed by Jang Jae-ha and Kim Jin-sung in the 2021 KBS1 TV series The King of Tears, Lee Bang-won.
- Portrayed by Park Si-won in the 2025 tvN series The Queen Who Crowns.

== See also ==
- History of Korea
- Styles and titles in Joseon
