= Yi Wŏn'gye =

Korean soldier and painter (1330–1388)

- Grand Prince of Joseon (posthumously)
- Born: 1330
- Died: October 23, 1388 (aged 58/9); Hwaju, Hamgyeong-do, Goryeo
- Spouse: Lady Kim; Lady Kim; Lady Mun
- Issue: 4 sons and 4 daughters
Posthumous name
- Count Wansan (완산백, 完山伯; given in 1392 by King Taejo); Grand Prince Wanpung (완풍대군, 完豊大君; given in 1872 by King Gojong)
- House: Yi
- Father: Yi Chach'un
- Mother: Lady Yi, of the Hansan Yi clan

Korean name
- Hangul: 이원계
- Hanja: 李元桂
- RR: I Wongye
- MR: I Wŏn'gye

Royal title
- Hangul: 완풍대군
- Hanja: 完豊大君
- RR: Wanpung daegun
- MR: Wanp'ung taegun

Art name
- Hangul: 불사재
- Hanja: 不思齋
- RR: Bulsajae
- MR: Pulsajae

Posthumous name
- Hangul: 양평
- Hanja: 襄平
- RR: Yangpyeong
- MR: Yangp'yŏng

Yi Wŏn'gye (Korean: 이원계; Hanja: 李元桂; 1330–1388), later posthumously promoted to Grand Prince Wanp'ung, was a warrior and painter in the late Goryeo period. He was the oldest child and son of Yi Chach'un, making him the older half-brother to Yi Sŏnggye, who later founded the Joseon dynasty.

After repulsing the Red Turban invasions and Japanese pirates, Yi was enfeoffed as the Prince Cheoksan (척산군; 陟山君) and later Prince Wansan (완산군; 完山君). Then, after the Joseon dynasty was established in 1392, he was posthumously enfeoffed as Count Wansan (완산백; 完山伯) and later enfeoffed as a grand prince in 1872 during King Gojong's reign.

== Biography ==
=== Early life ===
Born in 1330 (the 17th year of King Chungsuk of Goryeo's reign) at Heukseok village, Hwaryeong-bu (화령부; 和寧府) in the Ssangseong Prefecture of the Yuan dynasty, Yi Wŏn'gye was the oldest child and son of Yi Chach'un and his first wife, Lady Yi of the Hansan Yi clan.

However, he lost his mother only at the age of 4 and he was raised by his father's second wife, Lady Ch'oe who was Yi Sŏnggye's biological mother. According to the Veritable Records of the Joseon Dynasty, Yi Wŏn'gye and his brothers always lived together in the same place since their childhood, causing their brotherly bond to be very strong. He mastered the scriptures of Confucianism, wrote poetry well, and was also good at horseback riding and archery.

=== During Red Turban rebellion and later life ===
In 1359 (the 8th year of King Gongmin's reign), Red Turbans invaded from the Yuan dynasty, crossing the Yalu River. but immediately left after being repulsed. He also contributed for defeating the Red Turbans in Bakju and retook Gaegyeong during the second rebellion alongside Cho Ch'ŏn-ju (조천주) and others under general An U (안우)'s command. Then, he received many honors and was enfeoffed Prince Cheoksan (척산군; 陟山君) from the king in 1363. Later in 1375, he once again made contribution for the country.

He spent his old days in Wihwa-do and honoured as Prince Wansan (완산군; 完山君) while two years later after his death in 1388, he received his final title and honors for making big contribution during his lifetime. His title was later upgraded into Count Wansan (완산백; 完山伯) and received Yangpyeong (양평) as his Posthumous name during the reign of his half-brother, King Taejo.

=== Tomb and ancestral rites ===
He was buried on the right side of Jeongneung tomb, which was also his father's tomb and was enshrined at Samui Temple (삼의사), Bukcheong in 1901 while later moved to Seonwon Temple (선원사), Yiwon, Hamgyeongnam-do in 1909 alongside his last poem. However, after the Korean War, his descendants in South Korea held his ancestral rites every year on the first Sunday of the 10th months in the Korean calendar (lunar) at Heunggyeongdan, in Neunggok-ma, Daesim-ri, Yangseo-myeon, Yangpyeong-gun, Gyeonggi Province since 1984.

== Family ==
- Father: Yi Chach'un (1315–1360)
  - Grandfather: Yi Ch'un (d. 1342)
  - Grandmother: Queen Gyeongsun of the Munju Park clan (경순왕후 박씨)
- Mother: Lady Yi, of the Hansan Yi clan (부인 한산이씨, d. 1333)
  - Brother: Yi Chŏn-gye (이천계)
  - Sister: Kang U (강우)'s wife
- Wives and their issue(s):
1. Grand Lady of Samhan State, of the Gaeseong Gim clan (삼한국대부인 개성 김씨)
  1. Yi Yangu, Internal Prince Wanwon (완원부원군 이양우; 1346–1417), first son
  2. Yi Ch'ŏnu, Internal Prince Wansan (완산부원군 이천우; 1354–1417), second son
  3. Lady Yi, of the Jeonju Yi clan (부인 전주이씨), first daughter
2. Grand Lady of Samhan State, of the Gyeongju Kim clan (삼한국대부인 경주 김씨)
  1. Yi Cho, Internal Prince Wannampyeong (완남평부원군 이조; 1356–1408), third son
3. Grand Lady of Samhan State, of the Nampyeong Mun clan (삼한국대부인 남평 문씨); third daughter of Mun Ik-jŏm (문익점).
  1. Yi Paegon, Prince Wallyeong (완령군 이백온), fourth son
  2. Lady Yi, of the Jeonju Yi clan (부인 전주 이씨), second daughter
  3. Princess Sinhye, of the Jeonju Yi clan (신혜택주 이씨), third daughter
  4. Lady Yi, of the Jeonju Yi clan (부인 전주 이씨), fourth daughter

== In popular culture ==
- Portrayed by Kim Gyung-ha in the 1983 KBS TV series Foundation of the Kingdom.
- Portrayed by Lee Sung-woong in the 1996–1998 KBS TV series Tears of the Dragon
