= Queen Sindeok =

Queen of Joseon from 1392 to 1396

- Empress Consort of Korea (posthumously)

Queen Consort of Joseon
- Tenure: 13 August 1392 – 23 September 1396
- Predecessor: None
- Successor: Queen Jeongan
- Born: 20 July 1356; Goksan County, Seohae Province, Goryeo
- Died: 23 September 1396 (aged 40); Hanseong, Joseon
- Burial: Jeongneung, Seoul, South Korea
- Spouse: King Taejo
- Issue Detail: 2 sons, 1 daughter
Posthumous name
- Joseon: Queen Sunwon Hyeongyeong Sindeok (순원현경신덕왕후; 順元顯敬神德王后); Korean Empire: Empress Sunwon Hyeongyeong Sindeok Go (순원현경신덕고황후; 順元顯敬神德高皇后)
- Clan: Goksan Kang (by birth); Jeonju Yi (by marriage)
- Dynasty: Yi
- Father: Kang Yun-seong, Internal Prince Sangsan
- Mother: Internal Princess Consort Jinsan, of the Jinju Kang clan
- Religion: Buddhism

Korean name
- Hangul: 신덕왕후
- Hanja: 神德王后
- RR: Sindeok wanghu
- MR: Sindŏk wanghu

Queen Sindeok (Korean: 신덕왕후; Hanja: 神德王后; 20 July 1356 – 23 September 1396), of the Goksan Kang clan, was the second wife of King Taejo, the founder of Joseon. Known as Queen Hyeon during her tenure, she was queen of Joseon from 1392 until her death in 1396. She served as Taejo's political adviser and held great influence over him. Following the establishment of the Korean Empire, she was honored as Empress Sindeokgo.

== Biography ==
=== Early life and lineage ===
The future Queen Sindeok was born during the reign of King Gongmin of Goryeo, as the younger daughter among four sons and two daughters. Her father was Kang Yun-seong and her mother was a lady from the Jinju Kang clan (진주 강씨).

Whereas Lady Kang's maternal Jinju Kang clan was an elite military lineage that traced its roots to Goguryeo, her paternal Goksan Kang clan had been minor gentry for the vast majority of the Goryeo period and it was only near the twilight of the dynasty that they suddenly catapulted to prominence. Nevertheless, they were more influential in terms of immediate, high-level backing, whereas the family of Yi Seong-gye's first wife, Lady Han, lacked direct political leverage in the capital at that crucial time despite being a sprawling aristocratic clan. Additionally, Lady Kang's uncle, Kang Yun-chung (강윤충), was married to a daughter of Yi Seong-gye's uncle, Yi Ja-heung. All these factors combined made it possible for Lady Kang to come into contact with Yi Seong-gye and become his wife.

=== Marriage ===
According to legends, Yi Seong-gye's first meeting with Lady Kang happened as such: one day while hunting a tiger, Yi Seong-gye got thirsty and found a well, and there was a woman at the well. When Yi Seong-gye asked the woman to pour him some water, she poured water into a gourd and then floated a handful of willow leaves on top of the water. At this, Yi Seong-gye rebuked her, saying, "What kind of evil is this?". The woman replied shyly that she had to rush because he was thirsty, and if he drank the cold water, he would get sick. After hearing this, Yi Seong-gye was deeply moved by, and looked carefully at the oustandingly beautiful woman. He was mesmerized by her wisdom and beauty. The woman at the well was Lady Kang. This story is the same as the story of the meeting between King Taejo of Goryeo and Queen Janghwa. Both Queen Janghwa and Lady Kang were daughters of local gentry clans that had newly gained renown, as well as the second wives of the founder of their respective dynasties.

During the Goryeo period, aristocratic men were allowed two wives; one wife was known as the gyeongcheo (경처), the capital wife, while the other wife was known as the hyangcheo (향처), the countryside wife. Lady Kang married Yi Seong-gye in the late 1360s or early 1370s as his second (gyeongcheo) wife. At the time of the marriage, Lady Kang was more than 20 years younger than her husband; he already had a first (hyangcheo) wife and at least four sons, with the eldest among them being older than Lady Kang.

In early 1392, when Yi Seong-gye was seriously injured after falling off his horse and Jeong Mong-ju attempted to eliminate him, Lady Kang urgently sent Yi Seong-gye's fifth son, Yi Bang-won, who was observing mourning at the tomb of his mother, to bring Yi Seong-gye to safety. Furthermore, it was said that it was Lady Kang who appeased Yi Seong-gye's anger when he severely rebuked Yi Bang-won for assassinating Jeong Mong-ju.

=== Involvement in politics ===
With the founding of the new dynasty in 1392, Lady Kang became the first queen of Joseon and received the honorific title hyeon (현; lit. ''illustrious'').

She then formed a political alliance with Jeong Do-jeon and successfully convinced the newly enthroned Yi Seong-gye (posthumously King Taejo) to choose her second son, Yi Bang-seok, as successor to the throne. The adult sons of Lady Han, particularly Yi Bang-won, were outraged by the fact that their youngest half-brother, who was 10 years old at the time and hadn't contributed in any way to the founding of Joseon, had become the crown prince.

=== Death and aftermath ===
Lady Kang died at the age of 40, four years after her second son's appointment as crown prince. She was buried within Jeongneung (정릉) in present-day Seongbuk District, Seoul.

Her death affected King Taejo immensely. To pray for her soul, he built a small hermitage next to her tomb, and had incense and tea offered every morning and evening. He then ordered the construction of Heungcheonsa Temple to the east of the tomb; as soon as it was completed, it became a daily routine for Taejo to visit his wife's tomb and the temple. After touring the two sites, he would spend the evenings with his two sons by Lady Kang, and only return to his chambers upon hearing the temple bell ringing to announce the offering of prayers at the tomb. Moreover, Taejo would only pick up his chopsticks to eat during meals after hearing the Buddhist scriptures being chanted to pray for Lady Kang's repose.

In 1398, the First Strife of the Princes broke out, resulting in the elimination of her sons and the death of her son-in-law, leaving her only daughter, Princess Gyeongsun, to become a Buddhist nun. Shortly after, King Taejo abdicated in favor of his eldest surviving son, Yi Bang-gwa (posthumously King Jeongjong), who later passed the throne to Yi Bang-won (posthumously King Taejong).

As she had completely captivated King Taejo and, with the help of figures like Jeong Do-jeon, had her own son appointed as crown prince, the resentment of Lady Han's children against her had long reached its peak. Ultimately, this resentment persisted after Lady Kang's death and became the cause for King Taejong establishing regulations that banned sons of concubine birth from taking the civil service examination, effectively barring them from becoming high-ranking government officials.

== Titles ==
- During the reign of King Gongmin (r. 1351–1374):
  - Lady, of the Goksan Kang clan (곡산 강씨; 谷山康氏; from 20 July 1356)
    - Kang Yun-seong's daughter (강윤성의 딸)
    - Lady Kang (강씨; 康氏)
  - Mistress Boryeongtaek (Note: Or Mistress of Boryeong (Note: lit. ''safeguarding and peaceful'') Residence.) (보령택주; 保寧宅主; from unknown date)
- During the reign of King Taejo (r. 1392–1398):
  - Queen Hyeon (현비; 顯妃; from 13 August 1392)
  - Queen Sindeok (신덕왕후; 神德王后; from 1396)
- During the reign of Emperor Gojong (r. 1897 (Note: Reigned as king from 1864 to 1897.)–1907):
  - Empress Sindeokgo (신덕고황후; 神德高皇后; from 1899)

== Family ==
- Father: Kang Yun-seong (강윤성), Internal Prince Sangsan (상산부원군; ?–1358)
- Mother: Internal Princess Consort Jinsan (진산부부인), of the Jinju Kang clan (진주 강씨)
- Sibling(s)
  - Kang Deuk-ryong (강득룡)
  - Kang Sun-ryong (강순룡)
  - Kang Gye-gwon (강계권; ?–1413)
  - Kang Yun-gwon (강유권)
  - Lady, of the Goksan Kang clan (곡산 강씨) (Note: Married Shin Gwi (신귀).)
- Husband: King Taejo (태조대왕; 4 November 1335 – 27 June 1408)
  - Father-in-law: Yi Ja-chun (이자춘), King Hwanjo (환조대왕; 1315 – 3 May 1360)
  - Mother-in-law: Queen Uihye (의혜왕후), of the Yeongheung Choe clan (영흥 최씨; ?–1336)
- Issue
  - Princess Gyeongsun (경순공주; ? – 17 September 1407) (Note: Married Yi Je (이제), Prince Heungan (흥안군; c. 1365 – 6 October 1398) from the Seongju Yi clan (성주 이씨); eldest son of Yi In-rip (이인립; 1333–1387) and nephew of Yi In-im (이인임; 1312–1388). They had no biological issue (1 adopted son).)
  - Yi Bang-beon (이방번), Grand Prince Muan (무안대군; 1381 – 6 October 1398) (Note: ▪︎1st wife: Grand Princess Consort of Samhan State (삼한국대부인), of the Kaesong Wang clan (개성 왕씨; ?–1449); eldest daughter of Wang U (왕우), Prince Jeongyang (정양군; ?–1397) and niece of King Gongyang of Goryeo. ▪︎2nd wife: Lady, of the Wonju Byun clan (원주 변씨); daughter of Byun An-ryeol (변안렬; 1334–1390). ▪︎Issue: 1 adopted son.)
  - Yi Bang-seok (이방석), Grand Prince Uian (의안대군; 1382 – 6 October 1398)

== Ancestry ==
Ancestors of Queen Sindeok

Kang Deuk-ham (강득함)
Kang Suk-jae (강숙재)
Kang Seo (강서)
Kang Yun-seong, Internal Prince Sangsan (상산부원군 강윤성)
Lady, of the Jangsu Hwang clan (장수 황씨)
Queen Sindeok
Kang Eun (강은)
Internal Princess Consort Jinsan, of the Jinju Kang clan (진산부부인 진주 강씨)

== In popular culture ==
- Portrayed by Ha Mi-hye in the 1983 KBS1 TV series Foundation of the Kingdom.
- Portrayed by Kim Jeong-yeon in the 1983 MBC TV series 500 Years of Joseon: The King of Chudong Palace.
- Portrayed by Kim Young-ran in the 1996–1998 KBS1 TV series Tears of the Dragon.
- Portrayed by Yoon Joo-hee in the 2012–2013 SBS TV series The Great Seer.
- Portrayed by Lee Il-hwa in the 2014 KBS1 TV series Jeong Do-jeon.
- Portrayed by Kim Hee-jung in the 2015–2016 SBS TV series Six Flying Dragons.
- Portrayed by Park Ye-jin in the 2019 JTBC TV series My Country: The New Age.
- Portrayed by Ye Ji-won in the 2021–2022 KBS1 TV series The King of Tears, Lee Bang-won.

== See also ==
- Styles and titles in Joseon
- History of Korea
- Politics of Joseon

== Notes ==
Queen Sindeok Goksan Kang clan
Royal titles
New title	Queen Consort of Joseon; 1392–1396	Succeeded by Queen Jeongan of the Gyeongju Kim clan
