= Consort Jeong =

Consort Jeong may refer to:

== Consorts with the surname Jeong ==
- Imperial Consort Gwiin Jeong (1882–1943), concubine of Emperor Gojong of Korea

== Consorts with the title Consort Jeong ==
- Royal Consort Jeongbi Wang (died 1345), consort of Chungseon of Goryeo
- Royal Consort Jeongbi An (died 1428), consort of Gongmin of Goryeo
- Queen Wongyeong (1365–1420), wife of Taejong of Joseon

== Women who received the title Consort Jeong after their deaths ==
- Queen Jeongsuk, great-grandmother of Taejo of Joseon
- Royal Consort Jeongbin Kim (died 1404), stepmother of Taejo of Joseon
