= Princess Chŏnghwa (Hwanjo) =

Korean noblewoman (fl. 14th century)

Lady Yi
- Princess of Joseon (posthumously)
- Born: 1330; Goryeo
- Died: Unknown; Jangpung County, North Hwanghae Province, Joseon
- Burial: Cheonsu-won, Jeok-gyo, Seogyechwi, Jangpung County, North Hwanghae Province
- Spouse: Cho Inbyŏk
- Issue: 6 sons and 3 daughters, 1 adopted son and 1 adopted daughter
Posthumous name
- Princess Chŏnghwa (정화공주, 貞和公主; given in 1872 by Emperor Gojong of Korea)
- House: Yi
- Father: Yi Chach'un
- Mother: Lady Ch'oe, of the Yeongheung Ch'oe clan

Korean name
- Hangul: 정화공주
- Hanja: 貞和公主
- RR: Jeonghwa gongju
- MR: Chŏnghwa kongju

Lady Yi of the Jeonju Yi clan or posthumously called as Princess Chŏnghwa, was the fifth child, second and youngest daughter of Yi Chach'un and also a full younger sister of Yi Sŏng-gye, the founder of the Joseon Dynasty.

In 1392, her brother made a new dynasty, their father was granted royal title as King Hwan (환왕; 桓王; later Hwanjo; 환조; 桓祖) and their mother was granted the title as Queen Ui (의비, 懿妃; later Queen Uihye; 의혜왕후; 懿惠王后). Under Emperor Gojong of Korea's command, she was then posthumously honoured as Princess Chŏnghwa (정화공주; 貞和公主) in 1872. She married Cho Inbyŏk, son of Cho Ton from Hanyang Cho clan (한양 조씨; 漢陽 趙氏). After the Joseon Dynasty was established, Cho was then honoured as Internal Prince Yongwon (용원부원군).

== Family ==
- Father: Yi Chach'un (이자춘; 1315–1360) – son of Yi Ch'un and Lady Pak.
- Mother: Lady Ch'oe (최씨; 1304–?) – daughter of Ch'oe Han-gi and Lady Yi.
  - Brother: Yi Sŏng-gye (이성계; 1335–1408)
- Husband: Cho Inbyŏk, Internal Prince Yongwon (조인벽 용원부원군; 1327–?) – son of Cho Ton and Lady Yi.
  - Adopted daughter: Lady Cho (조씨; 1340–?)
  - First daughter: Lady Cho (조씨; 1343–?) – married Hwang Kil-wŏn (황길원).
  - Second daughter: Lady Cho (조씨; 1345–?) – married Im Maeng-yang (임맹양).
  - First son: Cho Pu (조부; 1347–?)
  - Adopted son: Cho On, Internal Prince Hancheon (조온 한천부원군; 1347–1417) – married firstly with Lady Jang, then remarried again with Lady Bak.
  - Second son: Cho Paek (조백; 趙伯; 1365–?)
  - Third son: Cho Po (조보; 趙保; 1368–?)
  - Third daughter: Lady Cho (조씨; 1370–?)
  - Fourth son: Cho Hu (조후; 1372–?)
  - Fifth son: Cho Yŏn, Internal Prince Hanpyeong (조연 한평부원군; 1374–1429) – married Lady Kim.
  - Sixth son: Cho Sa (조사; 1378–1432)
