= Red Turban invasions of Goryeo =

1359–60 Chinese rebel actions in Korea

Red Turban invasions of Korea
Date	December 1359 and November 1360
Location	Northern Korean Peninsula
Result	Goryeo victory

Belligerents
Goryeo dynasty	Red Turban army

Commanders and leaders
An U; Yi Bang-sil; Kim Deuk-sil; Kim Deuk-bae; Ch'oe Yŏng; Jeong Seun; Yi Sŏng-gye	Mao Ju-jing; Pan Cheng; Sha Liu †; Guan Xiansheng †; Zhou Yuan-shuai

Strength
~20,000 (1359); ~200,000 (1360)	~40,000 (1359); ~100,000 (1360)

The Red Turban invasions of Goryeo occurred in the 14th century, when the Red Turban Army (In Korean history they are recorded as the Honggeonjeok, or “Red Turban Bandits”), a peasant rebel force that arose in the Zhejiang area region against the Mongol-led Yuan dynasty invaded the Korean Peninsula. One branch of this movement advanced through northern China and Liaodong and invaded the Korean Peninsula twice, in 1359 (8th year of King Gongmin) and 1361 (10th year of King Gongmin).

== Background ==
The Mongol Empire entered history when Genghis Khan unified the Mongols in 1206. Throughout the 13th century it expanded relentlessly and came to dominate much of Eurasia. In 1234, the Mongols destroyed the Jin dynasty and took control of North China.

The Mongol invasions of Korea lasted from 1231 to 1259, and Goryeo capitulated to the Mongol empire under an agreement that Korea's local customs would be respected, and Korea became a "son-in-law state" from 1270 until 1356. In the mid-14th century, when the Yuan dynasty was beginning to crumble due to the Red Turban Rebellion, Gongmin reformed the Korean government, abolished Mongolian military outposts, purged pro-Yuan sentiments, and regained lost northern territories. The Red Turbans attacked Goryeo most likely because of military exigency.

In 1276, they captured Hangzhou, the capital of the Southern Song dynasty, and the last Song resistance ended at the Battle of Yamen in 1279. By then the Yuan dynasty ruled all of China, as well as Mongolia and Tibet. The Yuan emperors held nominal suzerainty over the Mongol khanates to the west. The Mongol Empire as a whole, which at its height stretched as far west as present-day Iran and Russia, was the largest contiguous empire in history. However, during the 14th century the empire began to weaken. Internal divisions among the Mongol ruling class and contradictions inherent in ruling over many non-Mongol peoples gradually undermined their authority. From the 1340s onward, natural disasters occurred almost every year. Many Chinese people began to believe that the Mandate of Heaven had abandoned the Yuan dynasty. Popular dissatisfaction was particularly strong in southern China.

In this region the White Lotus Society, a millenarian religious movement, spread widely among suffering peasants. In 1344, a massive flood changed the course of the Yellow River. Because the Yuan Dynasty depended on grain shipments from the south via the Grand Canal to supply the capital Dadu, it launched a massive river-repair project. Nearly 200,000 laborers were mobilized from across the empire. Although the project was completed successfully within a year, the resentment of the laborers continued to grow and eventually turned into a nationwide rebellion. By the 1350s, the scattered White Lotus believers organized themselves into armed rebel groups. The Red Turban Army, known for wearing red headscarves and red clothing, first rose in 1351, led by Liu Futong and others, calling for the overthrow of the Yuan dynasty. They supported Han Shantong, a religious leader of the White Lotus movement, and later his son Han Lin’er, claiming he was a descendant of Emperor Huizong of the Song dynasty. In 1355 they established a regime named Song and adopted the era name Longfeng.

== Prelude ==
However, the Red Turban forces were not a unified movement. Various rebel groups arose across China with different leaders, each fighting against the Yuan government. One such faction would eventually produce Zhu Yuanzhang, who later founded the Ming dynasty. Under the banner of “expelling the barbarians and restoring Chinese rule,” the Red Turbans expanded northward from southern China. Fierce battles erupted between them and Yuan government forces across northern China.

In 1354, the Yuan court even requested military aid from Goryeo. Goryeo dispatched over 2,000 troops and about 40 generals, including Yu Tak and Yeom Jesin, to fight the rebels. To prepare for instability on the continent, Goryeo also strengthened defenses along its northwestern frontier.

In 1354, the Red Turbans crossed the Yellow River. One group led by Guan Xiansheng and Po Touban attacked Dadu, the Yuan capital, in 1358. When they failed to capture it, they turned northeast in 1359, capturing Shangdu (the secondary Yuan capital) and later Liaoyang in Liaodong. As warfare engulfed Liaodong, many refugees fled into Goryeo. The Red Turbans sent a letter to Goryeo explaining their cause and attempting both persuasion and intimidation:

“The people have long been trapped in the hands of barbarians, and in anger we have raised an army for righteousness. We have recovered the Central Plains and marched east, west, south, and north. Everywhere the people welcome us as the hungry welcome fine food and the sick welcome good medicine. Our generals strictly forbid harming the people. Those who surrender will be treated well, but those who foolishly resist will be punished.”

Goryeo gave no response, instead strengthening its internal defenses.

== First Red Turban invasion ==
In 1359 (the 8th year of King Gongmin's reign), the Red Turban Army was sweeping through the Liaodong region centered around Liaoyang. The Yuan court also organized a punitive force to engage in large-scale battles with the Red Turbans and even managed to recapture Liaoyang. Consequently, the Red Turbans turned south and invaded the Korean Peninsula.

For strategic reasons, the Red Turbans at the time perceived Goryeo as an ally of the Yuan Dynasty. Therefore, they adopted a strategy of stabilizing Liaodong, which lay behind Goryeo, by attacking the country. Another reason is that the Red Turbans regarded Goryeo as a refuge. Indeed, amidst the tense military standoff in Liaodong, Goryeo was seen by the Red Turbans as a good sanctuary.

The crossing of the Yalu River by over 3,000 Red Turbans began in November of that year, followed by plunder and their return, served as the signal. Soon after, in December, 40,000 Red Turbans led by Mao Jujing crossed the frozen Yalu River and captured Uiju, subsequently capturing Jeongju and Inju the very next day. The Red Turbans' southward advance continued. They managed to occupy Seogyeong just 20 days after crossing the Yalu River. Seogyeong was a place that held great significance in political and military aspects from the early days of Goryeo's founding, serving as Goryeo's second capital.

The Goryeo army responded swiftly. In the early stages of the Red Turban invasion, figures close to King Gongmin, such as Gyeong Bok-heung and An U, were dispatched to the front. However, unable to withstand the fierce momentum of the Red Turban forces, they were pushed back all the way to Seogyeong. Goryeo immediately launched a nationwide response, including the massive mobilization of troops and horses. Meanwhile, preparations for evacuation were also being made in Gaeseong.

=== Counterattack ===
The Goryeo army immediately launched a counterattack. In January 1360 (the 9th year of King Gongmin), after a fierce battle in which both armies suffered thousands of casualties, the Goryeo army achieved the victory of recapturing Seogyeong just 20 days after it had been lost. Subsequently, the Goryeo army, led by An U and Yi Bang-sil, inflicted major defeats on the Red Turban Army at Hamjong and Seoncheon-gun.

The results of the battle at Hamjong are described in the "History of Goryeo" as follows:

“Although Shin Bu and Yi Gyeon were killed, the forces fought with all their strength, killing 20,000 enemies and capturing commanders Simja and Hwang Jiseon.”

Even after this battle, it took about two more months to completely drive out the Red Turbans. The Red Turbans inflicted devastating damage on the northwestern region even as they retreated. The Goryeo army no longer pursued the Red Turbans who had crossed the Yalu River and retreated. The following is a record of King Gongmin expressing his joy of victory at a banquet held in April of that year for his ministers who had returned victorious from war:

“He summoned his ministers and held a banquet, then bestowed a jade sash and a jade hat cord upon Yi Bang-sil. The Princess asked, ‘Your Majesty, why do you give such supreme treasures to others without sparing them?’ The King replied, ‘It is entirely due to Yi Bang-sil’s merit that our royal lineage has not fallen into the abyss and that the people have not been turned into fish and meat. Even if I were to cut off my own flesh to give, I would still not be able to repay you fully; how could I begrudge something like these items?’”

Although ultimately repelled, the havoc caused by the Red Turbans on Goryeo was substantial.

== Second Red Turban invasion ==
Although the Red Turbans initially retreated across the Yalu River, their power was not completely eradicated. Having withdrawn to the Liaodong region, they continued to intermittently enter and plunder the northwestern provinces of Goryeo. Goryeo dispatched officials such as Yi Gong-su and Ju Sa-chung to the Yuan Dynasty to assess the situation on the continent, but they were always forced to return because their path was blocked in Shenyang. Through this, the Goryeo court realized that the Red Turbans who had invaded the Korean Peninsula were part of a larger rebel force spread throughout the Mongol Empire. Consequently, Goryeo sought to restore relations with the Yuan, which had become strained since the anti-Yuan reforms of 1356 (the 5th year of King Gongmin's reign), in order to jointly counter the Red Turbans. As part of these measures, they dispatched envoys to the Yuan to express their friendly intentions and also reassigned officials to the Expeditionary Province of the Eastern Expedition. In addition, to strengthen domestic defenses, he inspected the military status of each province and established a system to rapidly mobilize troops, and also requisitioned horses from the ruling class.

=== Southern Evacuation to Bokju ===
In October 1361, a large Red Turban force—numbering over 100,000 troops and led by figures such as Pan Cheng, Sha Liu, Guan Xiansheng, and Zhu Yuanshuai—invaded Goryeo after being cut off from retreat routes in Hebei due to Yuan military pressure. Advancing rapidly, they captured a series of fortresses and approached Gaegyeong, passing through Jaryeong Pass (Jeollyeongchae) in mid-November and occupying the capital by late November. Under these circumstances, in December 1361, King Gongmin fled the capital to Bokju, passing through Gwangju and Chungju.

Regarding the urgent situation at the time, the "History of Goryeo" described it as follows:

“As the royal carriage departed for the south, the Princess abandoned her palanquin and rode a horse, and the horse ridden by the Second Consort, Lady Yi, was so emaciated and frail that everyone who saw it shed tears.”

Five days after King Gongmin left Gaegyeong, the Red Turbans finally captured the capital. While staying in Gaegyeong thereafter, the Red Turban army committed repeated acts of brutality, including burning the royal palace of Manwoldae, and killing and roasting civilian men and women to eat, or roasting and eating the breasts of pregnant women. After capturing Gaegyeong, the enemy encamped and remained there for two months, slaughtering horses and cattle to build fortifications with their hides and then spraying water to create ice sheets to prevent Goryeo troops from climbing over them.

King Gongmin and the Goryeo court designated Bokju, or present-day Andong, as their place of refuge and as a temporary capital. Bokju was chosen because its basin topography provided good defense against the Red Turbans from the north and Wokou from the south; it was a key transportation hub in Gyeongsang Province rich in resources; and it was a place with deep ties to the royal family and high-ranking Goryeo officials, such as Hong Eon-bak. It is said that while staying in Bokju, King Gongmin frequently visited Yeonghoru to observe military training, and the plaque of Yeonghoru, said to have been personally written by the king, still remains to this day.

=== Counteroffensive ===
Gongmin issued orders to prepare a counteroffensive. He appointed Jeong Se-un as Commander-in-Chief and recruited royalist troops from all over the country. Furthermore, troops were raised in various regions within the nation and, in the first month of 1362, gathered a force of about 200,000 troops at Cheonsusa Temple in the eastern outskirts (in present-day Paju). Having completed preparations for the counterattack, the 200,000-strong Goryeo army encamped on the outskirts of Gaegyeong in January of the following year, 1362 (the 11th year of King Gongmin's reign). Generals such as An U, Yi Bang-sil, Kim Deuk-bae, Choe Yeong, and Yi Seong-gye took part in the campaign to besiege the capital.

The battle, which began at dawn on January 18, 1362 was fierce. Goryeo forces took advantage of heavy snowfall that weakened the enemy’s defenses, and launched a full-scale assault from all sides. In the ensuing battle, the Red Turbans suffered devastating losses, including the deaths of key leaders such as Sha Liu and Guan Xiansheng, and about 100,000 casualties. The remaining forces fled in disarray across the Yalu River. As a result, King Gongmin, who had taken refuge in Bokju, was able to return to Gaegyeong after approximately fifty days.

Regarding the results, the History of Goryeo records:

“The area was filled with the corpses of enemies who died pushing and shoving among themselves; over 100,000 enemy heads were severed, and items such as the imperial seal of the Yuan Emperor, gold and silver treasures, seals made of gold, silver, and copper, and weapons were captured. The remaining 100,000 or so, including Paduban, fled across the Yalu River, and the rebels were finally pacified.”

With this, the second invasion by the Red Turbans came to an end.

== Aftermath ==
Although the capital was successfully recovered, the damage to Goryeo was severe. Areas occupied by the Red Turbans, including Gaegyeong during its roughly fifty-day occupation, suffered extensive looting and destruction. After victory over the Red Turbans, the political scene of Goryeo was engulfed in a bloody storm of conspiracies and schemes.

=== Assassination of Jeong Se-un ===
Four days after the recapture of Gaegyeong on January 18, 1362 (the 11th year of King Gongmin), an incident occurred in which three distinguished generals An U, Kim Deuk-bae, and Yi Bang-sil—killed Jeong Se-un, the commander-in-chief who was in overall command of the war. News of this situation reached Andong about fifteen days later. King Gongmin attempted to calm the generals by delivering a royal decree pardoning the crime of killing a commander, while simultaneously urging them to come to the temporary royal residence. The three generals each visited the temporary palace, but on February 29, An Woo arrived first and was killed by a scheme of Kim Yong. Yi Bang-sil and Kim Deuk-bae were also arrested and killed while on their way down in Yonggung-hyeon (present-day Yecheon, North Gyeongsang Province) and Sanyang-hyeon (present-day Mungyeong, North Gyeongsang Province), respectively. The three generals were eliminated on the charge of arbitrarily killing the commander-in-chief.

=== Heungwangsa Temple Incident ===
King Gongmin departed Bokju on February 25, 1362 (the 11th year of his reign) and set out for the capital. However, instead of entering Gaegyeong immediately, he spent about six months in Sangju and about four months in Cheongju. Then, on February 14 of the following year, 1363 (the 12th year of his reign), he stayed at Heungwangsa Temple near Gaegyeong, where he had set up a temporary palace. However, at dawn on the 1st day of the intercalary third month, an incident occurred in which about 50 insurgents, instigated by Kim Yong, attacked the temporary palace. The guards and soldiers on duty all fled, the eunuch Ahn Do-chi was killed in place of the King, and the Right Prime Minister Hong Eon-bak was killed while staying at his home. The situation was brought to a close the following day when military commanders, including Choi Yeong, led troops from Gaegyeong to suppress the rebels. About 20 days later, it was revealed that the ringleader was Kim Yong, and Kim Yong was executed.

=== Gyeongseong Restoration Meritorious Subjects ===
On the 15th day of the intercalary month of 1363, King Gongmin officially granted the title of Gyeongseong Restoration Meritorious Subjects, dividing the honors into First-Class and Second-Class with a total of 106 recipients. On the same day, additional merit titles were also awarded, including Heungwangsa Rebel Suppression Meritorious Subjects, Meritorious Subjects for Assisting the King During His Escape, Meritorious Subjects for Proposing and Gathering Troops to End the Crisis, Meritorious Subjects for Escorting the King in 1361, and Meritorious Subjects for Supporting Military Operations. Among these, the Gyeongseong Restoration group was the second largest, after those honored for escorting the king during his flight in 1361. Many recipients were military commanders who had directly participated in the battle, including Hwang Sang, Han Bang-sin, An U-gyeong, Yi Sun, Choe Yeong, Yi Gwi-su, and U Je, while later political leaders such as Yi In-im, Im Gyeon-mi, and Yeom Heung-bang were also included.

Notably, Yi Seong-gye—then only 29 years old—was listed among the First-Class Meritorious Subjects, along with his half-brother Yi Won-gye and Jo In-byeok, helping lay the foundation for the later rise of the northeastern regional faction. However, the commanders who had achieved the greatest military successes—An U, Yi Bang-sil, and Kim Deuk-bae—were excluded because they were killed shortly after the battle in connection with the assassination of Jeong Se-un. As these Gyeongseong Restoration Meritorious Subjects had mobilized real military forces and secured victory, they came to dominate the military power of the Goryeo state, and several figures such as An U-gyeong, Choe Yeong, and U Je were also honored again for suppressing the Heungwangsa Incident; however, as their influence grew, King Gongmin sought to restrain them by appointing Shin Don, who later carried out purges against many of these meritorious officials.

== Impact on Goryeo-Yuan Relations ==
The invasion and subsequent defeat of the Red Turbans had a significant impact on relations between Goryeo and the Yuan Dynasty. Due to the anti-Yuan policy implemented in the fifth year of King Gongmin's reign, the previously close relationship between Goryeo and the Yuan had rapidly turned into a strained one. However, with the emergence of a common enemy in the form of the Red Turbans, Goryeo sought to restore amicable relations with the Yuan. They dispatched envoys to the Yuan to report the defeat of the Red Turbans, and in response, the Yuan sent envoys to commend the achievements while also requesting a joint attack on the remaining Red Turbans in the Liaodong region.

Thus, relations between Goryeo and the Yuan Dynasty appeared to be recovering on the surface. However, the Yuan court soon launched an attempt to oust King Gongmin and install a new king. This was known as the enthronement of Prince Deokheung, or the dethronement of King Gongmin. This incident arose from a combination of Empress Ki's personal grudge against King Gongmin and the machinations of pro-Yuan factions, such as Choe Yu. Ultimately, in January 1364 (the 13th year of King Gongmin's reign), a Yuan army of 10,000 men led by Prince Deokheung and Choe Yu crossed the Yalu River and attacked Uiju. Goryeo countered by deploying figures such as Choe Yeong and Yi Seong-gye to the battlefield. In the end, the Yuan's attempt to depose King Gongmin failed following a military confrontation. With this, the Yuan court's political intervention in Goryeo came to a near end.

These events weakened King Gongmin’s reform policies and contributed to the rise of new military elites, including Yi Seong-gye. Meanwhile, Bokju, which had served as the temporary capital, was elevated in status to Andong Grand Protectorate (Andong Daedohobu).

== See also ==
- Korea under Yuan rule
- Gongmin of Goryeo
- Yi Sŏng-gye
- Red Turbans
