= Yoon-sung =

- Hangul: 윤성
- RR: Yunseong
- MR: Yunsŏng
- IPA: [junsʌŋ]

Yoon-sung, also spelled Yun-song, Yun-seong, is a Korean given name.

People with this name include:

- Kang Yun-sŏng (died 1358), father of Queen Sindeok of the Joseon dynasty
- Hong Yunsŏng (1425–1475), Joseon dynasty general
- Gaeko (born Kim Yoon-sung, 1981), South Korean rapper
- K (South Korean singer) (born Kang Yoon-sung, 1983), South Korean singer
- Jung Yoon-sung (born 1984), South Korean football forward
- Kang Yoon-sung (born 1997), South Korean football midfielder
- Chung Yun-seong (born 1998), South Korean tennis player

Fictional characters with this name include:

- Hong Yun-seong, character in the Soul series of video games, introduced in the 2002 game Soulcalibur II
- Lee Yoon-sung, character in the 2011 South Korean television series City Hunter

== See also ==
- List of Korean given names
