= Princess Anui =

Lady Yi
- Princess of Joseon (posthumously)
- Born: 1269; Wonsan, Gangwon Province, Goryeo
- Died: Unknown
- Spouse: Ju Dan (m.1292)
- Issue: Ju Hu
Posthumous name
- Princess Anui (안의공주, 安懿公主; given in 1901 by Emperor Gojong of Korea)
- House: Jeonju Yi (by birth); Neungseong Ju (by marriage)
- Father: Yi Haengni
- Mother: Lady Choe of the Dongju Choe clan

Korean name
- Hangul: 안의공주
- Hanja: 安懿公主
- RR: Anui gongju
- MR: Anŭi kongju

Lady Yi of the Jeonju Yi clan, posthumously honored as Princess Anui (Korean: 안의공주; Hanja: 安懿公主; 1269–?), was a Goryeo-born woman who became a part of the early Joseon Royal family member as the only daughter of Yi Haengni and would become the paternal grandaunt of Yi Seonggye, its founder.

After Joseon dynasty was established in 1392, her parents formally became a King (왕; 王) and Queen (왕비; 王妃) while she herself posthumously honoured as Princess Anui on April 15, 1901 (5th year reign of Emperor Gojong of Korea).

Although her death date and tomb are unknown, it was recorded that she married Ju Dan (주단) in 1292, son of Ju In-hwan (주인환) from the Neungseong Ju clan and bore him a son, Ju Hu (주후) in 1293. Their descendants continued to live in Yeongheung, Hamgyeong Province, Korea (now Geumya County, South Hamgyeong Province, North Korea).

== Family ==
- Father - Yi Haeng-ri, King Ikjo of Joseon (조선 익조; 1236–?)
- Mother - Queen Jeongsuk of the Dongju Choe clan (정숙왕후 동주 최씨; 1232–?)
- Sibling(s)
  - Older half-brother - Yi Ahn, Grand Prince Hamnyeong (이안 함녕대군; 1250–?)
  - Older half-brother - Yi Jang, Grand Prince Hamchang (이장 함창대군; 1253–?)
  - Older brother - Yi Song, Grand Prince Hamwon (이송 함원대군; 1256–?)
  - Older brother - Yi Won, Grand Prince Hamcheon (이원 함천대군; 1260–?)
  - Older brother - Yi Go-tae, Grand Prince Hamneung (이고태 함릉대군; 1263–?)
  - Older brother - Yi Chun, King Dojo of Joseon (이춘 조선 도조; 1265–1342)
  - Older brother - Yi Jeon, Grand Prince Hamyang (이전 함양대군; 1267–?)
  - Younger brother - Yi Eung-sin (이응신; 1270–?)
  - Younger brother - Yi Eung-geo, Grand Prince Hamseong (이응거 함성대군; 1274–?)
- Spouse
  - Ju Dan (좌군도통제 주단; 朱端; 1269–?)
- Issue
  - Son - Ju Hu (주후; 朱垕; 1293–?)
