= Kang Yun-seong =

Kang Yun-seong (강윤성) may refer to:

- Kang Yun-sŏng (died 1358), Goryeo person
- K (South Korean singer) (born 1983), South Korean singer
- Kang Yoon-sung (footballer) (born 1997), South Korean footballer
- Kang Yun-seong (director), South Korean filmmaker
