= Kim Mu-saeng =

South Korean actor (1943–2005)

- Portrait of Kim
- Born: March 16, 1943; Zuizan, Chūseinan-dō, Korea, Empire of Japan (present-day Seosan, South Chungcheong Province, South Korea)
- Died: April 16, 2005 (aged 62); Gangnam District, Seoul, South Korea
- Other name: Kim Moo-saeng
- Education: Dongguk University
- Occupation: Actor
- Years active: 1963–2004
- Spouse: Kim Ui-sook
- Children: 2, including Joo-hyuk

Korean name
- Hangul: 김무생
- Hanja: 金茂生
- RR: Gim Musaeng
- MR: Kim Musaeng

Kim Mu-saeng (16 March 1943 – 16 April 2005) was a South Korean actor.

== Early life and education ==
Kim was born in the town of Daesan in March 1943. He studied at Dongguk University in Seoul, beginning his career as a voice actor for Tongyang Broadcasting Company (now KBS) in 1963.

== Career ==
Kim made his on-screen acting debut in 1969, and went on to make over 100 appearances in film and television, his final role being in the television drama series Save the Last Dance for Me, which ended on 2 January 2005. In 2004, Kim appeared in a television commercial with his youngest son Kim Joo-hyuk, who was also an actor.

== Personal life ==
In July 2004, Kim travelled to a Mount Kumgang resort in North Korea for the tenth round of inter-Korean family reunions, where he met his maternal uncle Jang Gyeong-su.

His youngest son, Kim Joo-hyuk, died in a car crash in October 2017.

== Death ==
Kim died at the Samsung Medical Center in Irwon-dong from pneumonia on 16 April 2005, having suffered from a lung disease for the previous two years and spending a month in a coma. He was survived by his wife and his two sons.

== Legacy ==
In December 2005, Kim received a posthumous "Special Contribution Award" at the SBS Performance Awards ceremony.

== Partial filmography ==
Year	Title	Role
1969	Temporary Government in Shanghai	
1973	Special Force	
1976	Great Cause	
1977	Only You	
1979	The Trappings of Youth	
1981	1st Republic (TV)	Chough Pyung-ok
1985	A Deep, Deep Place	
1985	For Women, It's All or Nothing	
1985	The Imjin War (TV)	Yi Sun-sin
1986	Son of God	
1986	You Cannot Outdo Others	
1986	Susana's Experience	
1988	Fishing for Love	
1989	The Second Republic (TV)	
1993	The Third Republic (TV)	
1995	Jang Hee-bin (TV)	
1996	Tears of the Dragon (TV)	Lee Sung-gye
1997	Wedding Dress (TV)	Grandfather
1998	Heart of Lies (TV)	Lee Pil-ho
1998	Barefoot of Youth (TV)	Jang Myung-suk
1999	Trap of Youth (TV)	Chairman Noh Hoe-jang
2000	SWAT Police (TV)	Kim Hoe-jang
2000	Il Mare	
2001	Mina (TV)	
2001	Life is Beautiful (TV)	Chairman Yu
2002	The Dawn of the Empire (TV)	Wang-kyu
2002	Man of the Sun, Lee Je-ma (TV)	Choong Won-kong
2003	Cats on the Roof (TV)	Lee Pil-deuk
2004	Who's Got the Tape?	Tae-shik's father
2004	Into the Storm (TV)	
2004	Sweet Sixties	Jo Jin-bong
2004	Save the Last Dance for Me (TV)	Chairman Kang
