= Jeongbin Kim (Hwanjo) =

Korean royal consort (fl. 14th century)

Gim Goeumga
- Born: Gim Goeumga; Joseon?
- Died: 9 January 1404; Joseon
- Spouse: Yi Jachun (before 1361)
- Issue: Yi Hwa
Regnal name
- Princess Jeongan (정안옹주/정안택주, 定安翁主/貞安宅主; given c.1392)
Posthumous name
- Lady Gim, Royal Noble Consort Jeong (정빈 김씨, 定嬪 金氏; given in 1872 by Emperor Gojong of Korea)
- House: Gim clan (by birth); House of Yi (by marriage)

Korean name
- Hangul: 김고음가
- Hanja: 金高音加
- RR: Gim Goeumga
- MR: Kim Koŭmga

Gim Goeumga (Korean: 김고음가; Hanja: 金高音加; died 9 January 1404) or posthumously honoured as Royal Noble Consort Jeong, was the third wife of Yi Jachun.

== Biography ==
Born as Gim Goeumga (김고음가; 高音加), she was initially a Mistress in Yi Jachun's manor but later bore him a son, Yi Hwa (the future Grand Prince Uian) and become his consort. It was said that her step-son, Yi Seonggye (이성계; the future King Taejo of Joseon) always paid special attention to Gim and her son, also regarded them as his biological family too and always got down on his knees when deal and greeted her even it wasn't too mandatory.

When Seonggye was young, Gim accidentally saw 5 crows and asked him to shoot them with an arrow. Then, after he shot five arrows at the same time, she told him that he should never disclose such things to anyone. After Jachun's death in 1361, he brought her to Gaegyeong and burned down her slave documents.

Seonggye then established the new Joseon and gave Gim Royal title as Princess Jeongan (정안옹주; 定安翁主). She later died on 9 January 1404 (4th year reign of Seonggye's son, Yi Bangwon). Heard about this, Bangwon was very sad and suspended the inquiry for three days and mourned her. In 1872, during the 9th year reign of Emperor Gojong of Korea, she was honoured as "Royal Noble Consort" (빈; 嬪) with the character of Jeong (정; 定).
