= Queen Hyogong =

Queen consort of Joseon (fl. 13th century)

Queen Hyogong 효공왕후

Queen consort of Joseon (posthumously)
- Predecessor: Dynasty established (Queen Consort Han as the last posthumous queen consort of Goryeo)
- Successor: Queen Consort Choi
- Born: 1207; Goryeo
- Died: Unknown
- Burial: Alleung tomb
- Spouse: Mokjo of Joseon (m. 1223)
- Issue: 6 sons
- House: Pyeongchang Yi (by birth); Jeonju Yi (by marriage)
- Father: Yi Gong-suk
- Mother: Lady Jeong

Queen Hyogong of the Pyeongchang Yi clan (Korean: 효공왕후 이씨; Hanja: 孝恭王后 李氏; 1207–?) was the wife Yi Ansa and mother of Yi Haengni, making her great-grandmother to Yi Jachun who was the father of Yi Seonggye, Joseon's founder. Among the Joseon queens, she was the only one who came from the Yi clan and honoured as Hyo-Bi (효비; 孝妃; lit. 'fileal queen') at first.

== Biography ==
Her 4th great-grandfather was Yi Gwang, Prince Baekoh (이광 백오군; 1126–1170) from Pyeongchang-gun, Gangwon Province. Because King Sejong disallowed a man and woman from the same clan to marry and any woman with the surname Yi, she became the only Joseon Queen Consort whom came from a Yi clan (이씨; 李氏) in Joseon history.

In 28 July 1392, when Taejo established a new dynasty, she was granted the royal title Consort Hyo (효비; 孝妃) along with her husband whom was granted the title King Mok (목왕; 穆王). Later on 22 April 1411, King Taejong, gave her a posthumous name Queen Hyogong (효공왕후; 孝恭王后). Her tomb was located in Alleung, Neung-ri, Gapyeong-myeon, Siheung-gun, Hamgyeongnam-do along with her husband.

== Family ==
- Father: Yi Gong-suk (이공숙; 1176–?)
  - Grandfather: Yi Seong-ro (이성로)
  - Grandmother: Lady Jeong (정씨; 鄭氏)
- Mother: Princess Consort Dolsan of the Jeong clan (돌산군부인 정씨; 1180–?); Yi Gong-suk's second wife
  - Grandfather: Jeong Seok (정석; 鄭碩; 1160–?)
  - Grandmother: Lady Gim of the Samcheok Gim clan (삼척 김씨; 1160–?); daughter of Kim In-gwe (김인궤).
  - Sister: Lady Yi (이씨)
- Husband: Yi An-sa (이안사; 1204–1274)
- Son(s):
1. Yi Jeong, Grand Prince Anpung (이정 안풍대군; 1224–?) - married a woman from the Yi clan.
2. Yi Eo-seon, Grand Prince Ancheon (이어선 안천대군; 1230–1274) – married the daughter of Gim Nam-ok (김남옥) from the Gimhae Gim clan.
3. Yi Jin, Grand Prince Anwon (이진 안원대군; 1232–?) – married Princess Consort Pyeongsan of the Pyeongsan Sin clan (평산부부인 평산 신씨).
4. Yi Haeng-ri, Ikjo of Joseon (이행리 조선 익조; 1236–?) – married Queen Jeongsuk of the Deungju Choe clan (정숙왕후 최씨).
5. Yi Mae-bul, Grand Prince Anchang (이매불 안창대군; 1238–?) - married a woman from an unknown clan.
6. Yi Gu-su, Grand Prince Anheung (이구수 안흥대군; 1240–?) – married a woman from the Cheongju Han clan.
