= Cho Inbyŏk =

Goryeo military official (1330–1393)

- Hangul: 조인벽
- Hanja: 趙仁壁
- RR: Jo Inbyeok
- MR: Cho Inbyŏk

Posthumous name
- Hangul: 양렬
- Hanja: 襄烈
- RR: Yangryeol
- MR: Yangnyŏl

Honorary Title (given by King Taejo in c.1392/3)
- Hangul: 용원부원군
- Hanja: 龍源府院君
- RR: Yongwon buwongun
- MR: Yongwŏn puwŏn'gun

Cho Inbyŏk (Korean: 조인벽; Hanja: 趙仁壁; 1330–1393), was a military official in the Late Goryeo dynasty who came from the Hanyang Cho clan. He was the husband of Princess Jeonghwa, who was the sister of the founder of the Joseon dynasty, Yi Sŏng-gye, who granted him the title Internal Prince Yongwon when the dynasty was established.

== Biography ==
=== Early life and family background ===
Cho Inbyŏk was born into the Hanyang Cho clan in 1330 as a son of Cho Ton (조돈) and his wife, Lady Yi (부인 이씨), who was the daughter of Yi Hongbok (이홍복) from the Ganseong Yi clan. He had three younger brothers: Cho Ingyŏng (조인경), Cho Ingyu (조인규), and Cho Inok (조인옥).

His ancestors traced back Goryeo period as a local family from Yongjin-hyeon (용진현; 龍津縣). His great-grandfather, Cho Hwi, conspired with T'ak Ch'ŏng (탁청; 卓靑) and revolted in Ssangseong (쌍성; 雙城) in 1258 during King Gojong's reign. After they reached the north of Hwaju (화주; 和州) and surrendered to the Yuan dynasty, the position of Ssangseong General Government Office (쌍성총관부) was established, to which the Cho family were hereditarily appointed governors from generation to generation.

=== Military career ===
In 1361 (10th year of King Gongmin's reign), Cho (along with Pyŏn Annyŏl (변안열) and others) contributed when the Red Turbans invaded Goryeo. In 1363, he also contributed to subjugate Kim Yong's Rebellion (김용의 난).

In 1372, Hobaldo (호발도; 胡拔都), Changhaema (장해마; 張海馬), and others came to attacked Yisŏng (이성; 泥城) and Kanggye (강계; 江界), Cho went out as a judge and subjugated the enemy in Kaju (가주; 家州). Then, when the Japanese plundered Hamju (함주; 咸州) and Pukch'ŏngju (북청주; 北靑州), he marched out and ambushed the soldiers, defeating the Japanese and beheaded at least 70 people. From this achievement, he was worshiped as a pongiktaebu (봉익대부; 奉翊大夫).

=== Reign of King Chang ===
After King U was expelled to Ganghwa Island, his son, King Chang, ascended the throne. Around 1388, it was believed that U's birthday was in Todang (도당; 都堂), so Cho was sent alongside Ku Sŏngno (구성로) to Ganghwa in order to present clothes for him.

When U was in Ganghwa, he was immediately moved to Yeoheung-gun (여흥군; 驪興郡) led by Cho, Chi Yonggi (지용기), U Hongsu (우홍수), and Yu Chun (유준). Not long after that, Chang was dethroned and killed alongside his father due to the claims that he was not a true descendant of the House of Wang, but a descendant of Sin Ton.

=== Reign of King Gongyang ===
In 1389 (1st year reign of King Gongyang), Cho was promoted into the position of p'an ŭidŏkbu sa (판의덕부사; 判懿德府事) in Gyeongjin. However, when he was rewarded nokhun (녹훈) for his service to the country, he was believed to already be deceased.

=== Later life ===
After the new Joseon dynasty was established, Pyŏn Annyŏl, Wang Andŏk (왕안덕), Chi Yonggi, Yi Wŏn'gye, Chŏng Chi (정지), and Ch'oe Kongch'ŏl (최공철) all became the second rank merit subjects.

== Family ==
- Father: Cho Ton (조돈, 趙暾; 1307–1380)
  - Grandfather: Cho Yanggi (조양기, 趙良琪; b. 1260); son of Cho Hwi (조휘; 趙暉).
- Mother: Lady Yi of the Ganseong Yi clan (부인 간성이씨, 1309–1379)
  - Grandfather: Yi Hongbok (이홍복; 李洪福)
- Younger brothers:
  - Cho Ingyŏng (조인경, 趙仁瓊; d. 1422)
  - Cho Ingyu (조인규; 趙仁珪)
  - Cho Inok (조인옥, 趙仁沃; 1347–1396)
- Wives and children:
  - Lady Chŏng, of the Hadong Chŏng clan (부인 하동정씨)
    - 1st son: Cho On, Internal Prince Hancheon (조온 한천부원군, 趙溫 漢川府院君; 1347–1417)
  - Lady Yi, of the Jeonju Yi clan (부인 전주이씨)
    - 2nd son: Cho Yŏn, Internal Prince Hanpyeong (조연 한평부원군, 趙涓 漢平府院君; 1374–1429)
    - 3rd son: Cho Hu (조후, 趙候; 1377–1444)
    - 4th son: Cho Sa (조사, 趙師; d. 1432)
    - 5th son: Cho Pu (조부; 趙傅)
    - 1st daughter: Lady Cho (부인 조씨) – married Hwang Kilwŏn (황길원; 黃吉源).
    - 2nd daughter: Lady Cho (부인 조씨) – married Im Maengyang (임맹양, 林孟陽; d. 1388), nephew of Im Kyŏnmi (임견미, 林堅味; d. 1388).
