= Park Chong-hwa =

Korean writer (1901–1981)

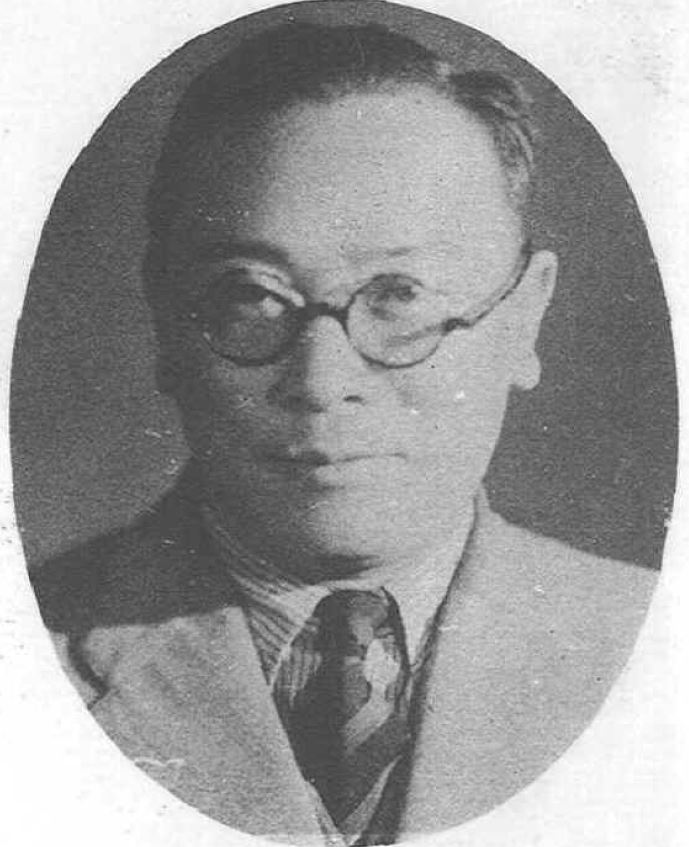
- Born: October 29, 1901
- Died: January 3, 1981 (aged 79)
- Writing career
- Language: Korean

Korean name
- Hangul: 박종화
- Hanja: 朴鍾和
- RR: Bak Jonghwa
- MR: Pak Chonghwa

Park Chong-hwa (Korean: 박종화; October 29, 1901 – January 13, 1981) was an early-modern Korean poet and novelist.

== Biography ==
Park Chong-hwa was born October 29, 1901, in Seoul, Korean Empire. Park wrote under the name Woltan and attended the Huimun Uisuk Academy. He worked as a member of the literary club Swan (1922) and was the vice-chairman of the Choson Writers' Association in 1946. He also served as the Chairman of the Seoul Committee for Arts (1947) and the Writers' Association of Korea (1949). Park was named the President of the Korea Arts Council (1955) and Chairman of the Board of the Korean Writers' Association (1964). He died on January 13, 1981.

== Poetry ==
Park first entered the literary world as a poet, publishing “Anguished Youth” (Onoeui cheongchun 오뇌의 청춘) and “Milk-colored Streets” (Uyubit geori 우유빛거리) in the inaugural issue of the journal Rose Village (Jangmichon) in 1921, and “Returning to the Secret Room” (Milsillo doragada 밀실로 돌아가다 ) and “Elegy” (Manga) in the 1922 inaugural issue of White Tide (Baekjo). With his first poetry collection, Private Melodies of the Black Room (Heukbang Bigok, 1924), Park established his reputation as a romantic poet.

During the Japanese occupation, censorship, prison, or even death followed overt literary resistance and the predominant emotion among Korean writers in the 1920s was near-despair. Poets like Pak Chong-hwa and Yi Sang-hwa therefore turned to dark imitations of the European decadent movement. However, in a poem like "Koryo Celadon" Pak uses an aesthetic theme as an indirect statement of national pride, which was later to be taken up in his novels.

12th century celadon ware

Bluish green with subtle lines,
O supple smooth curving,
Like a bodhisattva’s shoulders,
Grace and elegance combined.
A swallow spurns the waves
And cleaves the April breeze.
But wake! – for this is Koryo celadon,
This was ours for a thousand years.

Depth of color, softly shaded;
Iridescent kingfisher;
Blue sky glimpsed through autumn clouds
As the rain squall passes on;
Or a white cloud, fresh with dew,
Wings its way on high.
But wake! – for this is Koryo celadon,
This was ours for a thousand years.

Flagons, pitchers, bowls and dishes,
Ink slabs, censers, incense boxes,
Vases, wine cups, pillows, drums;
They are clay – but they are jade!

During the Goryeo period of a thousand years before, the unique grey-green celadon ware (ceong-ja) had been the main type of ceramics produced on the Korean peninsula but under Japanese rule, artware pottery had all but disappeared from the country. In the past it had been particularly associated with Buddhist ceremonies, hence the bodhisattva reference in the first stanza. The poem then turns to later successors of ceong-ja, the so-called white celadon (baek-ja) and cobalt-blue kingfisher shade mentioned in the second stanza, and in the third to the types of use to which the pottery was put.

== Novels ==
Learning this approach through his poetry, Park Jonghwa devoted the rest of his life to writing historical novels that espouse Korean nationalism. The Literature Translation Institute of Korea summarizes this part of his career:

Devotion to Korean national identity remained the dominant theme of both Park Jonghwa’s fiction and life. Even in the climate of intense persecution toward the end of the Japanese colonial rule, Park Jonghwa refused to adopt a Japanese surname or participate in pro-Japanese literary organizations as many of his colleagues had done. During the colonial period, Park published several works of historical fiction, including Blood on a Silk Sleeve (Geumsamui pi, 1936), Long Awaited Spring (Daechunbu, 1939), The Eve (Jeonya, 1942), and Compassion (Dajeongbulsim, 1942). After the Liberation, Park Jonghwa continued to be active in the nationalist camp, serving as the vice president of both Pan-Korean Writers’ Association (Jeon Joseon munpilga hyeophoe) and Pan-Korean Federation of Cultural Organizations (Jeonguk munhwa danche chong yeonhaphoe). He also expressed his euphoria at the recovery of national independence in The Nation (Minjok), the final work in the trilogy that followed The Eve and Compassion.
Thereafter, Park Jonghwa turned to more remote times to continue his examinations of Korean history from a nationalist perspective. The Japanese Invasion of 1592 (Imjinwaeran 임진왜란, 1955), Hong Gyeongrae 홍경래 (1958), and The World in Women’s Hands (Yeoin cheonha 여인천하, 1959) all manifest his desire to unearth the vigorous spirit of national pride from the pages of Korean history. By virtue of meticulous research and awareness of history’s grand scope, Park Jonghwa managed to preserve in these historical novels a great variety of Korean habits of thought and folk customs.

A last major work was King Sejong the Great (세종대왕) serialised in Chosun Ilbo from 1969 to 1977 running to 2456 episodes, and later the basis for the TV series, Tears of the Dragon.

== Works in Translation ==
- King Sejong : a novel (translated by Ahn Junghyo, New York 1980)

== Works in Korean (Partial) ==
Novels

- Blood on the Royal Sleeve (금삼의 피) serialised in 1936 in the Maeil Sinbo
- Ode to Spring
- Friendly Buddha
- My People
- The Japanese Invasion
- Resting Cloud

== Awards ==
- Cultural Medal by the Order of the President in 1962
- May 16 Nationalism Prize in Literature in 1966
- Republic of Korea Rose-of-Sharon Citizen's Medal in 1970.
