= Gwiin Jeong =

Korean imperial consort (1882–1946)

- Noble Lady
- Born: 10 April 1882; Sungsin-bang, Hanseong, Joseon
- Died: 20 March 1946 (aged 63); Gyeongseong, southern Korea
- Burial: Seosamneung Cluster, Goyang, South Korea
- Consort of: Gojong of Korea
- Issue: 1 son
- Clan: Haeju Jeong (by birth); Jeonju Yi (by marriage)
- Dynasty: Yi
- Father: Jeong Gwang-yeon
- Mother: Lady, of the Naju Jeong clan

Korean name
- Hangul: 귀인 정씨
- Hanja: 貴人 鄭氏
- RR: Gwiin Jeongssi
- MR: Kwiin Chŏngssi

Gwiin Jeong of Bohyeondang Hall (Korean: 보현당 귀인 정씨; Hanja: 寶賢堂 貴人 鄭氏; 10 April 1882 – 20 March 1946), of the Haeju Jeong clan, was a consort of Gojong of Korea.

== Family ==
- Father: Jeong Gwang-yeon (정광연)
  - Aunt: Maria (정마리아)
- Mother: Lady, of the Naju Jeong clan (나주 정씨)
  - Uncle: Jeong Chang-gyo (정창교)
    - Cousin: Jeong Won-seok (정원석)
- Husband: Emperor Gojong of Korea (대한제국의 고종황제; 大韓帝國的 高宗皇帝; 8 September 1852 – 21 January 1919)
- Issue:
  - Yi U (이우; 李堣; 20 August 1915 – 25 July 1916), Gojong's 10th son
