= Guiren =

Guiren may refer to:

- Guiren, sometimes translated as "noble lady", a rank in the imperial Chinese harem system after the 1st century
- Guiren, Jiangsu, a town in Sihong County, Jiangsu, China
- Gueiren District, Tainan, Taiwan
