= Yi Chahŭng =

Korean nobleman (fl. 14th century)

- Grand Prince of Joseon (posthumously)
- Born: Yi Chahŭng; 1305; Goryeo
- Died: before 1371; Goryeo
- Burial: Gwiju-dong, Hamheung
- Spouse: Lady Cho of the Hanyang Cho clan
- Biological Adoptive: Yi Kyo-ju; Yi Chong-ryong; Yi Chŏn-gye
Posthumous name
- Grand Prince Wanchang (완창대군, 完昌大君; given in 1872 by King Gojong)
- House: Yi
- Father: Yi Ch'un
- Mother: Lady, of the Munju Bak clan

Korean name
- Hangul: 이자흥
- Hanja: 李子興
- RR: I Jaheung
- MR: I Chahŭng

Royal title
- Hangul: 완창대군
- Hanja: 完昌大君
- RR: Wanchang daegun
- MR: Wanch'ang taegun

Art name
- Hangul: 취헌
- Hanja: 翠軒
- RR: Chwiheon
- MR: Ch'wihŏn

Courtesy name
- Hangul: 성첨
- Hanja: 聖瞻
- RR: Seongcheom
- MR: Sŏngch'ŏm

Posthumous name
- Hangul: 정간
- Hanja: 貞簡
- RR: Jeonggan
- MR: Chŏnggan

Yi Chahŭng (born 1305), posthumously known as Grand Prince Wanchang, was a late Goryeo period second rank official (좌윤; 左尹) who became part of the early Joseon royal family member as the first and oldest son of Yi Ch'un, making him uncle to Yi Sŏng-gye, its founder.

He studied under the tutelage of U T'ak as one of his students. Yi served the Yuan dynasty as a chiliarch (천호; 千戶). After his nephew, Yi Sŏng-gye (이성계) established the new dynasty, Yi Chahŭng was posthumously given the office of the minister of military affairs (병조판서; 兵曹判書) and on 9 March 1871, Yi was given the posthumous name Chŏnggan (정간; 貞簡). In 1872, Emperor Gojong of Korea gave him a posthumous name as Grand Prince Wanch'ang (완창대군; 完昌大君) and was enshrined in Yŏngjongjŏnggyŏng (영종정경; 領宗正卿) alongside his parents. Their tomb located at Gwiju-dong, Hamheung.
