= Yi Chach'un =

Yi Chach'un 이자춘 李子春
- King of Joseon (posthumously)

Darugachi
- Reign: 1343–1356
- Born: 20 January 1315; Aldong, Ssangseong Prefecture, Yuan dynasty
- Died: 3 June 1361 (aged 46); Gwiju-dong, Hamheung-bu, Dongbuk-myeon, Goryeo
- Burial: Jeongneung tomb Hamju County, South Hamgyeong Province, North Korea
- Spouse: Lady Yi; Queen Uihye
- Issue: 5 sons and 1 daughter
Posthumous name
- First: King Hwan (환왕, 桓王; given in 1392 by King Taejo); Last: King Yeonmu Seonghwan the Great (연무성환대왕, 淵武聖桓大王; given in 1411 by King Taejong)
Temple name
- Hwanjo (환조; 桓祖)
- House: Jeonju Yi
- Father: Yi Ch'un
- Mother: Lady Bak of the Munju Bak clan

Yi Chach'un (Korean: 이자춘; Hanja: 李子春; 20 January 1315 – 3 June 1361), also known as Hwanjo, was a minor military officer of the Yuan Empire who later transferred his allegiance to Goryeo and became the father of Yi Sŏnggye, founder of the Joseon Dynasty. Yi's Mongolian name was Wulusibuhua (Korean: 울루스부카; Hanja: 吾魯思不花).

== Biography ==
Yi Chach'un was a chiliarch of a Yuan Dynasty mingghan in Ssangseong Prefecture (present-day Kŭmya County, South Hamgyŏng Province, North Korea - former Goryeo territory annexed by Mongol Empire). After Ssangseong was reconquered by Goryeo under King Gongmin, he migrated to Hamju and got promoted to manho (the equivalent of the Mongolian myriarch of a tümen, lit. ten thousand or chief of ten thousand). He married a Goryeo-Korean lady from Anbyeon, who became Queen Uihye, the mother of Yi Sŏnggye. He died in Hamgyong in 1361.

Since he was glamorized by his descendants, descriptions of Yi Chach'un's life tend to be contradictory to each other. For example, he is said to have risen to the rank of scholar-official. However, when he died, the king at the time expressed condolences for Chach'un as if for scholar-officials, implying that Yi Chach'un was not a scholar-official.

== Family ==
- Father: Yi Ch'un (1265–1342)
  - Grandfather: Yi Haengni (1236–?)
  - Grandmother: Queen Jeongsuk of the Deungju Ch'oe clan (1232–?)
- Mother: Queen Kyŏngsun of the Munju Pak clan (1268–?)
  - Grandfather: Pak Kwang (박광; 1240–?)
- Wives and their Children:
1. Queen Ŭihye of the Yeongheung Ch'oe clan (의혜왕후 영흥 최씨; 1304–?)
  1. Princess Chŏnghwa (1330–?), First daughter
  2. Yi Sŏnggye, King Taejo of Joseon (1335–1408), Third son
2. Royal Noble Consort Yi of the Hansan Yi clan (빈 한산 이씨; 1319–1334)
  1. Yi Wŏn'gye, Grand Prince Wanpung (1330–1388), first son
  2. Yi Ch'ŏn'gye, Grand Prince Yeongseong (1333–1376), second son
3. Royal Noble Consort Jeong, of the Gim clan (정빈 김씨; 1320–1404)
  1. Yi Hwa, Grand Prince Ŭian (1348–1408), Fifth son
4. Unknown woman (1325–?)
  1. Yi Yŏng (이영; 1341–1394), Fourth son

== In popular culture ==
- Portrayed by Park Gyung-deuk in the 1983 KBS1 TV series Foundation of the Kingdom
- Portrayed by Jeon Byung-ok in the 2005–2006 MBC TV series Shin Don.
- Portrayed by Jung Dong-gyu in the 2012 SBS TV series Faith.
- Portrayed by Lee Soon-jae in the 2015–2016 SBS TV series Six Flying Dragons.

== See also ==
- List of Goryeo people
- History of Korea
