= Yi Yang-mu =

Goryeo general (fl. 13th century)

Yi Yangmu 이양무 李陽茂
- Born: 1186; Jeonju, North Jeolla Province, Goryeo
- Died: 1231 (aged 44-45); Hwalgi Village, Samcheok, Gangwon Province, Goryeo
- Burial: Yireung tomb / Jungyeong tomb 333–360, Jungyeong-gil, Miro-myeon, Samcheok, Gangwon Province, South Korea
- Spouse: Lady Yi of the Samcheok Yi clan (m. 1201)
- Issue: 5 sons, including Yi An-sa
Posthumous name
- Venerable Spirit of Initial Progenitor ("Seonjo") and Sire, the General of Goryeo ("선조"고고려장군존령; "先祖"考高麗將軍尊靈)
- Father: Yi In
- Mother: Lady, of the Nampyeong Mun clan
- Religion: Buddhism

- Yi Yang-mu
- Hangul: 이양무
- Hanja: 李陽茂
- RR: I Yangmu
- MR: I Yangmu

Yi Yang-mu (Korean: 이양무; Hanja: 李陽茂; 1186–1231) was a Goryeo general and nephew of Yi Ui-bang, father of Queen Sapyeong. As part of the Jeonju Yi clan, he was the 5th generation ancestor of Yi Sŏng-gye, founder of the Joseon Dynasty.

In his middle days, he followed his oldest son to Hwalgi village, Samcheok until his death in 1231 (18th regal year of King Gojong). He was buried in Jungyeong Tomb (준경묘, 濬慶墓 or 준경릉, 濬慶陵), Hwalgi-ri; while his wife was buried in Yeonggyeong Tomb (영경묘; 永慶墓), Dongsan-ri, which both are located at Miro-myeon, Samcheok, Gangwon Province. On 16 April 1899 (3rd years reign of Emperor Gwangmu), the emperor placed a memorial tablet and tombstones on both graveyards.

== Ancestry and Family ==
Ancestors of Yi Yang-mu

Yi Chin-yu (이진유)
Yi Kung-jin (이궁진)
Lady O (오씨)
Yi Yong-bu (이용부)
Lady Yi or Lady Kim (이씨 or 김씨)
Yi In (이인)
Yi Hyŏng (이형)
Lady Yi (이씨)
Yi Yang-mu (이양무)
Mun Ik (문익)
Mun Kong-yu (문공유)
Lady Yu (유씨)
Mun Kŭk-kyŏm (문극겸)
Han An-in (한안인)
Lady Han (한씨) of the Danju Han clan
Lady Mun (문씨) of the Nampyeong Mun clan
Yi Si-min (이시민)
Lady Yi (이씨)

Yang-mu married the daughter of Yi Kang-che (이강제; 李康濟) from the Samcheok Yi clan who was posthumously honoured as Lady Yi, Wife of the Ancestor (선조비 이씨; 先祖妣 李氏). They had a total of five sons: Yi An-in (이안인); their second son, Yi An-sa, who would become the ancestor of Yi Sŏng-gye; Yi Yŏng-p'il (이영필; 李英弼); Yi Yŏng-mil (이영밀; 李英謐); and Yi Yŏng-sŭp (이영습; 李英襲).
