= Yi Haengni =

Yi Haengni 이행리 李行里
- King of Joseon (posthumously)

Darugachi
- Reign: 1300–?
- Born: Yi Haengni (이행리); 1236; Wonsan, Kangwon Province, Goryeo
- Died: Wonsan, Kangwon Province, Goryeo
- Burial: Jireung tomb
- Spouse: Lady Son Queen Jeongsuk (m. 1250)
- Issue: 9 sons and 1 daughter
Posthumous name
- First: King Ik (익왕, 翼王; given in 1392 by King Taejo); Last: King Ganghye Seongik the Great (강혜성익대왕, 康惠聖翼大王; given in 1411 by King Taejong)
Temple name
- Ikjo (익조; 翼祖)
- House: House of Yi
- Father: Mokjo of Joseon
- Mother: Queen Hyogong of the Pyeongchang Yi clan

Yi Haengni (Korean: 이행리; Hanja: 李行里; 1236–?) was the great-grandfather of Yi Seonggye, the founder of the Joseon Dynasty.

After his death, he was given the temple name Ikjo (익조; 翼祖) by his great-great-grandson, King Taejong and his tomb was located in Jireung, Anbyeon County, South Hamgyeong Province. Meanwhile, his wife, Queen Jeongsuk was buried in Sukneung, Muncheon County, South Hamgyeong Province.

== Family ==
- Father: Yi Ahn-sa, King Mokjo of Joseon (조선 목조; 1204–1274)
  - Grandfather: Yi Yang-mu, Prince Sangjang (이양무 상장군; 1186–1231)
  - Grandmother: Lady Yi of the Samcheok Yi clan (삼척 이씨; 1282–?)
- Mother: Queen Hyogong of the Pyeonchang Yi clan (효공왕후 이씨; 1207–?)
  - Grandfather: Yi Gong-suk (천우위장사 이공숙; 1176–?)
  - Grandmother: Lady Jeong, Princess Consort Dolsan (돌산군부인 정씨; 1180–?)
- Wives and their Children(s):
1. Lady Son (손씨)
  1. Yi An or Yi Gyu-su, Grand Prince Hamnyeong (이안 or 이규수 함녕대군; 1250–?)
  2. Yi Jang or Yi Bok, Grand Prince Hamchang (이장 or 이복 함창대군; 1253–?)
2. Queen Jeongsuk of the Dongju Choe clan (정숙왕후 최씨; 1232 – 20 September ?)
  1. Yi Song, Grand Prince Hamwon (이송 함원대군; 1256–?)
  2. Yi Won, Grand Prince Hamcheon (이원 함천대군; 1260–?)
  3. Yi Go-tae, Grand Prince Hamneung (이고태 함릉대군; 1263–?)
  4. Yi Chun, King Dojo of Joseon (조선 도조; 1265–1342)
  5. Yi Jeon, Grand Prince Hamyang (이전 함양대군; 1267–?)
  6. Princess Anui (안의공주; 1269–?)
  7. Yi Eung-sin (이응신; 1270–?)
  8. Yi Eung-geo, Grand Prince Hamseong (이응거 함성대군; 1274–?)
