= Grand Prince Ŭian (born 1348) =

Grand Prince of Joseon (1348–1408)

Yi Hwa
- Grand Prince of Joseon (posthumously)

Count of Joseon Duke of Joseon
- Reign: 1392–1408
- Coronation: 1392
- Born: Yi Hwa; 1348; Hwaju, Ssangseong Prefecture, Yuan
- Died: 6 October 1408 (aged 60/1); Hanseong-bu, Joseon
- Burial: ?? Pyeongnae-dong, Namyangju-si, Gyeonggi Province
- Spouse: Lady An; Lady No
- Issue: 7 sons and 1 daughter
- House: Yi
- Father: Yi Cha-ch'un
- Mother: Lady Kim Koŭmga
- Religion: Buddhism, later Korean Confucianism

Korean name
- Hangul: 이화
- Hanja: 李和
- RR: I Hwa
- MR: I Hwa

Royal title
- Hangul: 의안대군
- Hanja: 義安大君
- RR: Uian daegun
- MR: Ŭian taegun

Art name
- Hangul: 이요정
- Hanja: 二樂亭
- RR: Iyojeong
- MR: Iyojŏng

Posthumous name
- Hangul: 양소
- Hanja: 襄昭
- RR: Yangso
- MR: Yangso

Yi Hwa (Korean: 이화; Hanja: 李和; 1348–1408) or Grand Prince Ŭian, was a warrior and scholar in the late Goryeo period who became part of the early Joseon dynasty royal family as the fourth son of Yi Chach'un, making him a younger half-brother to Yi Sŏnggye, its founder.

== Biography ==
He served as an assistant commander to his older half-brother, Yi Sŏnggye. After Yi Sŏnggye founded the Joseon dynasty in 1392, Yi Hwa was honoured as Count Ŭian (의안백; 義安伯), and after helping his half-nephew Yi Pangwŏn in defeating the 1st rebellion, Ŭian became Jeongsagongsin (정사공신).

In 1400, during the 2nd Princes Strife, Yi campaigned again under the command of Yi Pangwŏn. Ŭian, along with Yi Sukbŏn (이숙번; formally called Prince Anseong, 안성군) and Yi Paekgang (이백강; formally called Prince Cheongpyeong, 청평군) were successful in defeating Yi Panggan (이방간; formally called Grand Prince Hoean, 회안대군) and Yi Maengjong (이맹종; formally called Prince Uiryeong, 의령군). He was then promoted to Jwamyeonggongsin (좌명공신; 佐命功臣) along with 47 others.

After his previous successes, including defeating Chŏng Mongju with Yi Pangwŏn, Yi Hwa became the richest nobleman in the Early Joseon period and was promoted until he had passed the 4 positions in the military. He had various titles, such as "Count Ŭian" and "Duke Ŭian", but after Yi Pangwŏn (a.k.a. Taejong) reorganized the royal titles system and abolished the 5 Deungjak (오등작), Yi Hwa was elevated to Grand Prince Ŭian (의안대군; 義安大君). According to tradition, an illegitimate child (especially a son) could not have the same rank as a legitimate child. However, Yi Hwa became the illegitimate heir of Hwanjo, and his rank was equal to that of Hwanjo's legitimate heir because of Yi Hwa's contributions in helping Yi Sŏnggye establish the new dynasty.

== Family ==
- Wives and children:
1. Grand Lady of Samhan State of the Sunheung An clan (삼한국대부인 순흥 안씨)
  1. Yi Chisung, Prince Suncheon (이지숭 순천군, d. 1419) – 1st son.
2. Grand Lady of Samhan State of the Gyoha No clan (삼한국대부인 교하 노씨)
  1. Yi Suk, Prince Wancheon (이숙 완천군, 1373–1406) – 2nd son.
  2. Yi Ching, Prince Hakcheon (이징 학천군, 1375–1435) – 3rd son.
  3. Yi T'am, Prince Yeongcheon (이담 영천군, b. 1379) – 4th son.
  4. Yi Hyo, Prince Jeoncheon (이효 전천군, d. 1446) – 5th son.
  5. Yi Hoe, Prince Heungcheon (이회 흥천군, b. 1381) – 6th son.
  6. Yi Chŏm, Prince Ikch'ŏn (이점 익천군, d. 1433) – 7th son.
  7. Lady Yi (부인 이씨) – 1st daughter.
3. Maehwa (매화) – No issue.

== Others ==
=== Ranks and titles ===
- Ranks:
  - In 1398, became Jeongsagongsin rank 1 (정사공신 1등).
  - In 1400, became Jwamyeonggongsin rank 3 (좌명공신 3등).
  - On 5 July 1407, became Chief State Councillors (영의정).
- Titles
  - During his lifetime:
    - Count Ŭian (의안백; 義安伯) in 1392.
    - Duke Ŭian (의안공; 義安公).
    - Prince Ŭian (의안군; 義安君).
  - After his death (along with Posthumous name):
    - Grand Prince Ŭian (의안대군; 義安大君).
    - Grand Prince of the Ŭian Mansion (의안부원대군; 義安府院大君).

=== Legacy ===
- Yi Hwa Heritage Museum (이화 개국공신녹권, 李和 開國功臣錄券) – Became the National Treasure No. 232 on 15 October 1986; located in Jeongeup-si, South Korea.
- The Shrine of Grand Prince Ŭian (의안대군 사당) – Became the Namyangju National Treasure No. 4 on 10 April 1986; located in 151–4, Pyeongnae-dong, Namyangju-si, Gyeonggi-do, South Korea.

=== Descendants ===
Although his descendants were farmers until King Jeongjo of Joseon and King Sunjo of Joseon's reign, it is said that nowadays, almost of Yi Hwa's descendants are living comfortably inSeoul.

Preceded by Seong Seok-rin 성석린	Chief State Councillors of Joseon; 5 July 1407 – 26 May 1408	Succeeded by Ha-Ryun 하륜
