= Grand Prince Yeongseong =

Joseon prince (fl. 14th century)

Yi Cheongye
- Grand Prince of Joseon (posthumously)
- Born: Yi Cheon-gye; 1315 (before 1344); Goryeo
- Died: 1376; Goryeo
- Spouse: Lady Bak
- Issue: Yi Ran; Yi Seop; Yi Cheok; Yi Sil; Yi Jong; 3 daughters
Posthumous name
- Grand Prince Yeongseong (영성대군, 永城大君; given in 1872 by King Gojong)
- House: House of Yi
- Father: Yi Jachun (biological); Yi Jaheung (adoptive)
- Mother: Lady, of the Hansan Yi clan

Korean name
- Hangul: 이천계
- Hanja: 李天桂
- RR: I Cheongye
- MR: I Ch'ŏn'gye

Royal title
- Hangul: 영성대군
- Hanja: 永城大君
- RR: Yeongseong daegun
- MR: Yŏngsŏng taegun

Art name
- Hangul: 석천
- Hanja: 石川
- RR: Seokcheon
- MR: Sŏkch'ŏn

Courtesy name
- Hangul: 순흠
- Hanja: 順欽
- RR: Sunheum
- MR: Sunhŭm

Posthumous name
- Hangul: 효민
- Hanja: 孝愍
- RR: Hyomin
- MR: Hyomin

Yi Cheon-gye (Korean: 이천계; Hanja: 李天桂; died 1376), formally called Grand Prince Yeongseong (영성대군; 永城大君), was a warrior in the late Goryeo periods who became part of the early Joseon dynasty royal family member as the second son of Yi Jachun and half elder brother to Yi Seonggye, its founder.

Cheon-gye was raised by his uncle, Yi Ja-heung in his early days and appointed as a Chumil (추밀; 樞密) at the end of the Goryeo period alongside received his first title, Prince Wanseong (완성군; 完城君). Although he was older than Seong-gye, it was said that he was reluctant towards him. According to the records left, both Cheon-gye and his sister attempted a rebellion, but Seong-gye who know this suddenly stopped them. In 1376, a powerful man used his power to take over Cheon-gye's subordinate's wife but imprisoned under Seong-gye's command and died shortly after. In particular after his death, King Taejo posthumously granted him a sacrificial rite, and conferred the "Bulcheonwi" (불천위; 不遷位) while later received his posthumous name, Hyomin (효민; 孝愍) in 1871.

Yi married a daughter of Bak Jong-geon (박종건) from the Miryang Bak clan and had total of 5 sons and 3 daughters. It was recorded that Lady Bak's tomb is located at Chukjeon-dong, Judong Temple (now Gama-dong, Huju-ri), Hamheung. However, all were collapsed in 1866 and renamed by Song Rae-hui (송래희), a Sungkyunkwan governor while enshrined at Sedeok Temple.

== Family ==
- Father: Yi Jachun, King Hwan (이자준 환왕; 20 January 1315 – 3 June 1361)
- Mother: Lady, of the Hansan Yi clan (부인 한산이씨; d. 1333)

Consorts and their respective issue(s):

- Internal Princess Consort, of the Miryang Bak clan (부부인 밀양 박씨)
  - Yi Ran, Prince Miryang (이란 밀양군; 1357 – 5 August 1428), 1st son
  - Yi Seo, Prince Mireun (밀은군 이섭), 2nd son
  - Yi Cheok, Prince Milchun ( 밀춘군 이척), 3rd son
  - Yi Seol, Prince Mirreung (밀릉군 이실), 4th son
  - Yi Jong, Prince Mirseong (밀선군 이종), 5th son
  - Lady Yi, of the Jeonju Yi clan (이 씨), 1st daughter
  - Lady Yi, of the Jeonju Yi clan (이 씨), 2nd daughter
  - Lady Yi, of the Jeonju Yi clan (이 씨), 3rd daughter
