= Queen Jeongsuk =

Queen consort of Joseon (fl. 13th century)

Queen Jeongsuk 정숙왕후

Queen consort of Joseon (posthumously)
- Predecessor: Queen Consort Yi
- Successor: Queen Consort Bak
- Born: 1232; Wonsan, Gangwon Province, Goryeo
- Died: 20 September
- Burial: Sukneung tomb Muncheon-gun, Hamgyeongnam-do
- Spouse: Ikjo of Joseon (m. 1250)
- Issue: Yi Song; Yi Won; Yi Go-tae; Yi Ch'un; Yi Jeon; Princess Anui; Yi Eung-sin; Yi Eung-geo
- House: Yeongheung Choe (by birth); Jeonju Yi (by marriage)
- Father: Choe Gi-yeol

Queen Jeongsuk of the Yeongheung Choe clan (Korean: 정숙왕후 최씨; Hanja: 貞淑王后 崔氏; 1232–20 September ?) was the second wife of Yi Haengni and mother of Yi Chun, making her the great-grandmother of Yi Seonggye, the founder of the Joseon Dynasty. She was honoured as Jeong-Bi (정비; 貞妃; "the virtuous queen") at first.

== Biography ==
She was born in 1232 as the daughter of Choe Gi-Yeol, Prince Anbyeon (최기열 안변군) from the Dongju Choe clan (동주 최씨; 東州 崔氏) and his unnamed wife. She was the second wife of Yi Haengni (이행리) because his first wife, Lady Son (손씨) died too early.

On 28 July 1392, when her great-grandson, Yi Seong-Gye (이성계) established a new dynasty, she was given the royal title Jeong-bi (정비; 貞妃; literally: Queen Jeong or Consort Jeong) and her husband was given the title King Ik (익왕; 翼王). Later on 22 April 1411, her great-great-grandson, Taejong of Joseon, gave her a posthumous name, Queen Jeongsuk (정숙왕후; 貞淑王后).

With Yi Haeng-ni, she had 7 sons and 1 daughter. However, she later died on 20 September in an unknown year. Her tomb was located in Sukneung, Muncheon-gun, Hamgyeongnam-do and her husband's tomb was located in Jireung, Anbyeon-gun, Hamgyeongnam-do.

== Family ==
- Father - Choe Gi-Yeol, Prince Anbyeon (최기열 안변군; 1205–?)
- Unnamed mother (1205–?)
- Spouse - Yi Haeng-ni, King Ikjo of Joseon (조선 익조; 1236–?)
  - Father-in-law - Yi Ahn-sa, King Mokjo of Joseon (조선 목조; 1204–1274)
  - Mother-in-law - Queen Hyogong of the Pyeonchang Yi clan (효공왕후 이씨; 1207–?)
- Issue
  - Son - Yi Song, Grand Prince Hamwon (이송 함원대군; 1256–?)
  - Son - Yi Won, Grand Prince Hamcheon (이원 함천대군; 1260–?)
  - Son - Yi Go-tae, Grand Prince Hamneung (이고태 함릉대군; 1263–?)
  - Son - Yi Chun, King Dojo of Joseon (조선 도조; 1265–1342)
  - Son - Yi Jeon, Grand Prince Hamyang (이전 함양대군; 1267–?)
  - Daughter - Princess Anui (안의공주; 1269–?)
  - Son - Yi Eung-sin (이응신; 1270–?)
  - Son - Yi Eung-geo, Grand Prince Hamseong (이응거 함성대군; 1274–?)
