= Queen Ŭihye =

Korean queen (fl. 14th century)

Queen Ŭihye 의혜왕후
- Grand Lady of Three Han State (삼한국대부인; 三韓國大夫人)

Queen consort of Joseon (posthumously)
- Coronation: 1411
- Predecessor: Queen Consort Bak
- Successor: Queen Consort Han
- Born: Before 1312
- Died: 1336
- Burial: Hwareung tomb Dongheung-ri, Hamheung-si, South Hamgyong Province
- Spouse: Hwanjo of Joseon
- Issue: Princess Jeonghwa; Taejo of Joseon
- House: Yeongheung Ch'oe clan
- Father: Ch'oe Hangi
- Mother: Grand Lady Yi of Joseon State

Queen Ŭihye of the Yeongheung Ch'oe clan (Korean: 의혜왕후 최씨; Hanja: 懿惠王后 崔氏; ? – 1336) was the wife of Yi Chach'un and mother of Yi Sŏng-gye, Joseon's founder. She was posthumously honoured as Ŭibi (의비; 懿妃; lit. 'virtuous queen') at first.

== Biography ==
=== Early life ===
The future Queen Ŭihye was born in 1304 into the Yeongheung Ch'oe clan as the youngest daughter of the Korean chiliarch of the Yuan dynasty called Ch'oe Han-gi (최한기; 崔閑奇), who was later posthumously honoured as the Duke Jeonghyo and Internal Prince Yeongheung (영흥부원군 정효공 최한기; 永興府院君 靖孝公 崔閑奇) and Grand Lady Yi of Joseon State (조선국대부인 이씨; 朝鮮國大夫人 李氏).

Her father's family name was Cho but was later changed to Ch'oe in order to receive complete blessings for her later marriage. Her family long resided in today's Anbyon County, Kangwon Province, North Korea, which was once called Deungju (등주; 登州) during the Goryeo period. Having become very wealthy by saving a lot of money, her family were known to be rich amongst the local population.

=== Youth life ===
It was said that from young, Lady Ch'oe was intelligent and had many unusual things. When her parents reached the age of poverty, they wanted her to marry the son of Kim Rin (김린; 金麟), but when she did not listen, they offered to divide the household goods in half. Knowing this, Ch'oe cried sadly and said, "How can someone unexpectedly marry Kim Rin's son when they are born into this world and have a great relationship? A matchmaker will come soon." (사람이 세상에 태어나서 큰 인연이 있는데 어찌 뜻밖에 김린의 아들에게 시집갈 수 있겠는가. 배필이 곧 이를 것이다).

=== Marriage and death ===
Then, Yi Chach'un went to Cho'e Han-gi's house on business, when she had a good dream that two dragons came down from the sky, one went into her stomach and the other into her womb. Since they meet each other in there, Yi then proposed Lady Choe and they were married. During her lifetime after married, Lady Choe more commonly called as Grand Lady of the Three Han State (삼한국대부인; 三韓國大夫人). She then bore Yi 1 son (Yi Sŏng-gye) and 1 daughter (Princess Jeonghwa). However, she died before Joseon was established.

After Yi Sŏng-gye founded the new Joseon Dynasty, she was posthumously honoured as Consort Ui (의비; 懿妃) by him. In the following year, by the order her grandson, King Taejong, she was posthumously honoured as Queen Consort Ŭihye (의혜왕후; 懿惠王后).

=== Tomb and funeral ===
The Queen was buried in Hwareung Tomb (화릉; 和陵), Dongheung-ri, Hamheung-si, South Hamgyong Province, adjacent from her husband in Jeongneung Tomb.

In 1471 (2nd year reign of Seongjong of Joseon), her funeral was held in Yeongnyeong Hall (영녕전; 永寧殿) and in 1795 (19th year reign of Jeongjo of Joseon), her veneration was held again in Yeongheung Palace (영흥본궁; 永興本宮).

== Family ==
- Father
  - Internal Prince Yeongheung, Duke Jeonghyo, Ch'oe Hangi (증 영흥부원군 정효공 최한기; 贈 永興府院君 靖孝公 崔閑奇; 1260–?)
- Mother
  - Princess Consort Hongwŏn, Grand Lady of Joseon State of the Wansan Yi clan (증 홍원군부인 조선국대부인 완산 이씨; 贈 洪原郡夫人 朝鮮國大夫人 李氏; 1262–?)
- Siblings
  - Older brother - Ch'oe Hoyŏn (최호연; 崔浩延; 1282–?)
  - Older sister – Princess Kyŏngch'ang of the Yeongheung Ch'oe clan (경창옹주 최씨; 慶昌翁主 崔氏; 1293–?)
  - Older brother - Ch'oe Pangbo (최방보; 1298–?)
  - Older sister – Princess Consort Yŏnghŭng of the Yeongheung Ch'oe clan (영흥군부인 최씨; 永興郡夫人 崔氏; 1300–?)
  - Older sister - Lady Ch'oe of the Yeongheung Ch'oe clan (최씨; 1302–?)
- Husband
  - Yi Chach'un, Hwanjo of Joseon (조선 환조; 1315 – 3 May 1360)
    - Father-in-law – Yi Ch'un, Dojo of Joseon (조선 도조; 1265–1342)
    - Mother-in-law – Queen Kyŏngsun of the Munju Park clan (경순왕후 문주 박씨; 1268–?)
- Issue
  - Daughter – Princess Chŏnghwa (정화공주; 1330–?)
  - Son – Yi Sŏng-gye, Taejo of Joseon (조선 태조; 27 October 1335 – 18 June 1408)
