= Yi An-sa =

Yi An-sa 이안사 李安社
- King of Joseon (posthumously)

Darugachi
- Reign: 1252–1274
- Born: Yi An-sa (이안사); 1204; Jeonju, North Jeolla Province, Goryeo
- Died: 3 March 1274 (aged 69-70); Jeonju, North Jeolla Province, Goryeo
- Burial: Deokneung tomb
- Spouse: Queen Hyogong (m. 1223)
- Issue: 6 sons
Posthumous name
- First: King Mok (목왕, 穆王; given in 1392 by King Taejo); Last: King Inmun Seongmok the Great (인문성목대왕, 仁文聖穆大王; given in 1411 by King Taejong)
Temple name
- Mokjo (목조; 穆祖)
- House: House of Yi
- Father: Yi Yang-mu
- Mother: Lady Yi of the Samcheok Yi clan

Yi An-sa (1204 – 3 March 1274) was a Goryeo nobleman who would become the great-great-grandfather of Yi Seonggye, founder of the Joseon Dynasty.

On 28 July 1392, when Taejo made a new dynasty, he was granted the royal title King Mok (목왕; 穆王). After his death in 1274, he was buried in Deokneung, Neung-ri, Gapyeong-myeon, Sinhung-gun, South Hamgyong Province, North Korea and given the temple name Mokjo (목조; 穆祖) by his great-great-great-grandson, King Taejong on 22 April 1411 along with his posthumous name.

== Family ==
- Father: Yi Yang-mu (이양무; 1186–1231)
  - Grandfather: Yi Rin (이린; 1150–?)
  - Grandmother: Lady Mun of the Nampyeong Mun clan (남평 문씨; 1149–?); third daughter of Mun Geuk-gyeom (문극겸; 1122–1189).
- Mother: Lady Yi of the Samcheok Yi clan (삼척 이씨; 1182–?)
  - Grandfather: Yi Gang-je (이강제; 1161–1260)
    - Older brother: Yi An-in (이안인; 1202–?)
    - Younger brother: Yi Yeong-pil (이영필; 1205–?)
    - Younger brother: Yi Yeong-mil (이영밀; 1206–?)
    - Younger brother: Yi Yeong-seup (이영습; 1208–?)
- Wife: Queen Hyogong of the Pyeonchang Yi clan (효공왕후 이씨; 1207–?)
  - First son: Yi Eo-seong, Grand Prince Ancheon (이어선 안천대군; 1230–1274)
  - Second son: Yi Jin, Grand Prince Anwon (이진 안원대군; 1232–?)
  - Third son: Yi Jeong, Grand Prince Anpung (이정 안풍대군; 1234–?)
  - Fourth son: Yi Haeng-ni (이행리 익조대왕; 1236–?)
  - Fifth son: Yi Mae-bul, Grand Prince Anchang (이매불 안창대군; 1238–?)
  - Sixth son: Yi Gu-su, Grand Prince Anheung (이구수 안흥대군; 1240–?)
