= Tears of the Dragon (TV series) =

South Korean historical television series

- Also known as: Dragon's Tears
- Hangul: 용의 눈물
- Hanja: 龍의 눈물
- RR: Yongui nunmul
- MR: Yongŭi nunmul
- Genre: Historical
- Based on: Sejong the Great King by Park Chong-hwa
- Written by: Lee Hwan-kyung
- Directed by: Kim Jae-hyung
- Starring: Kim Mu-saeng; Yoo Dong-geun; Ahn Jae-mo
- Country of origin: South Korea
- Original language: Korean
- No. of episodes: 159

Original release
- Network: KBS1
- Release: November 24, 1996 – May 31, 1998

Tears of the Dragon (Korean: 용의 눈물) is a South Korean historical drama television series. It aired on KBS1 from November 24, 1996 to May 31, 1998 for 159 episodes. The series spans from the foundation of Joseon to the reign of King Sejong. It's considered one of the best historical dramas in South Korea, reaching a viewership rating of 49%. It is also the first series based on historical researches on Prime Minister Jeong Do-jeon.

== Plot ==
The series portrays the life of Yi Bang-won (posthumously known as "Taejong"), the third king of Joseon and fifth son of its founder. It depicts him as being committed to the stability of the kingdom, a commitment that translates into affection and devotion towards his father and his heir (originally Taejong's first-born son, Yi Je), although these feelings are not reciprocated due to anger about the various assassinations and executions carried out by Taejong. The anger culminates in the retired Taejo's efforts to remove his son by backing the Jo Sa-wi rebellion and personally shooting an arrow at him during a reconciliation meeting. Taejong grows to become perpetually suspicious of those around him (especially his in-laws), resulting in purges, a typical example being his execution of his wife's influence-peddling-but-loyal oldest brothers and naively-innocent youngest brothers. In disgusted response, his crown prince rejects the throne to become a playboy and his second-born son, Yi Bo, joins the Buddhist priesthood, deferring the position to the third-born son, Yi Do.

== Sources ==
The series is based on the long-running newspaper novel 세종대왕 (Sejong the Great) by Park Chong-hwa, serialised in Chosun Ilbo, which ran for 2456 episodes from 1969 to 1977.

== Cast ==
- Kim Mu-saeng as Yi Seong-gye/King Taejo, first ruler of Joseon
- Han Young-sook as Queen Sinui, Taejo's first wife
- Kim Young-ran as Queen Sindeok, Taejo's second wife
- Tae Min-young as Yi Bang-gwa/King Jeongjong, second ruler of Joseon
- Yoo Dong-geun as Yi Bang-won/King Taejong, third ruler of Joseon
- Choi Myung-gil as Queen Wongyeong, Taejong's wife
- Kim Hye-ri as Royal Noble Consort Hyo, Taejong's concubine
- Lee Min-woo as Grand Prince Yangnyeong, Taejong's first son
- Ahn Jae-mo as Grand Prince Chungnyeong/King Sejong, fourth ruler of Joseon
- Im Seo-yeon as Queen Soheon, Sejong's wife
- Kim Heung-gi as Jeong Do-jeon

== Awards and nominations ==
Year	Award	Category	Recipient	Result
1997	KBS Drama Awards	Grand Prize (Daesang)	Yoo Dong-geun	Won
1997	KBS Drama Awards	Top Excellence in Acting Awards, Best Actor	Kim Mu-saeng	Won
1997	KBS Drama Awards	Top Excellence in Acting Awards, Best Actress	Choi Myung-gil	Won
1997	KBS Drama Awards	Best Supporting Actor	Seon Dong-hyuk	Won
1997	KBS Drama Awards	Best New Actress	Song Yoon-ah	Nominated
1997	KBS Drama Awards	Best Young Actor	Kim Min-woo	Nominated
1998	34th Baeksang Arts Awards	Best TV Actor	Yoo Dong-geun	Won
1998	34th Baeksang Arts Awards	Technical Award, Costume Department	—N/a	Won
