= Kang Yunsŏng =

Goryeo civil official (fl. 14th century)

- Hangul: 강윤성
- Hanja: 康允成
- RR: Gang Yunseong
- MR: Kang Yunsŏng

Art name
- Hangul: 용담
- Hanja: 龍潭
- RR: Yongdam
- MR: Yongdam

Courtesy name
- Hangul: 대경
- Hanja: 大卿
- RR: Daegyeong
- MR: Taegyŏng

Kang Yunsŏng (Korean: 강윤성; Hanja: 康允成; 1302 – December 1358) was a Korean civil official of Goryeo dynasty. He was the father of Queen Sindeok who was the second wife of King Taejo of Joseon or known as Yi Sŏng-gye.

== Biography ==
Kang was born was the son of Kang Sŏ (강서; 康庶) and passed the civil service examination during the reign of King Chunghye of Goryeo. He would later become a Hallim Academican (한림학사; 翰林學士; Hallim haksa), as well as the deputy minister of personnel (이부시랑; 吏部侍郎; ibu sirang). One of the reasons why Taejo of Joseon married his daughter was to form connections with local forces in the capital region since the powerbase of Taejo's own clan was in the borderlands.

== Family ==
- Father
  - Kang Sŏ (강서; 康庶; 1275–?)
- Mother
  - Lady Hwang of the Jangsu Hwang clan (장수 황씨; 1275–?); daughter of Hwang Baek (황백; 黃伯; 1240–1310)
- Siblings
  - Older brother: Kang Yun'gwi (강윤귀; 康允貴; 1300–?)
  - Younger brother: Kang Yunch'ung (강윤충; 康允忠; 1304–?)
  - Younger brother: Kang Yunŭi (강윤의; 康允誼; 1306–?)
  - Younger brother: Kang Yunhwi (강윤휘; 康允暉; 1310–?)
  - Younger brother: Kang Yunbu (강윤부; 康允富; 1312–?)
- Wife: Internal Princess Consort Jinsan of the Jinju Kang clan (증 진산부부인 진주 강씨; 晉山府夫人 晉州 姜氏; 1305–1380); daughter of Kang Eun (강은; 姜誾; 1270–1350)
- Issue
  - Son: Kang Sullyong (강순룡; 康舜龍; 1324–1398)
  - Son: Kang Tŭngnyong (강득룡; 康得龍; 1324–1400)
  - Daughter: Lady Kang (강씨; 1328–?)
  - Son: Kang Yugwŏn (강유권; 康有權; 1334–1420)
  - Son: Kang Kyegwŏn (강계권; 康繼權; 1356–1413)
  - Daughter: Queen Shindeok of the Goksan Kang clan (12 July 1356 – 15 September 1396)
    - Son-in-law: Yi Dan, King Taejo of Joseon (27 October 1335 – 18 June 1408)

== Sources ==
- 高雲基. 韓国の中世における女性 : 13世紀の文献資料を中心に (PDF). 慶應義塾大学日吉紀要. 言語・文化・コミュニケーション No.27. 慶應義塾大学日吉紀要刊行委員会.
