= Yi Ch'un =

Yi Ch'un 이춘 李椿
- King of Joseon (posthumously)
- Born: Yi Ch'un (이춘); Goryeo
- Died: 24 July 1342 (aged 76–77); Goryeo
- Burial: Uireung tomb
- Spouse: Queen Gyeongsun; Lady Jo (m.1322)
- Issue: 5 sons and 3 daughters
Names
- Childhood name: Yi Sŏn-rae (이선래; 李善來); Mongolian name: Bayan Temür (바얀테무르; 孛顔帖木兒)
Posthumous name
- First: King Do (도왕, 度王; given in 1392 by King Taejo); Last: King Gongui Seongdo the Great (공의성도대왕, 恭毅聖度大王; given in 1411 by King Taejong)
Temple name
- Dojo (도조; 度祖; sometimes spelled Takjo (탁조) due to other Hanja readings)
- House: Yi
- Father: Yi Haeng-ni
- Mother: Lady, of the Yeongheung Choe clan

Yi Ch'un (? – August 25, 1342 (Note: In the Chinese calendar (lunar), he died on the 24th day of the 7th Lunar month of the 2nd year of Zhizheng (1342).)) or known for his Mongolian name Bayan Temür (Mongolian script: Баян төмөр; Pai-yen tö-mör) was the grandfather of Yi Sŏng-gye, founder of the Joseon Dynasty.

From Yuan dynasty, he replaced his father, Yi Haeng-ni (이행리) as a chiliarch. He later married Lady Pak of the Munju Pak clan (문주 박씨; the future Queen Gyeongsun) and had 2 sons, they were: Yi Cha-hŭng and Yi Cha-ch'un, the biological father of Yi Sŏng-gye. After Pak's death, Yi remarried again with Lady Cho (조씨), the daughter of Cho Yang-gi (조양기). In 5 August 1392, his grandson, Yi Sŏng-gye founded the Joseon Dynasty and he posthumously honoured his grandfather as King Gonguiseongdo the Great (공의성도대왕; 恭毅聖度大王) and gave him the temple name Dojo (도조; 度祖). He was buried in Uireung, Hamheung-si, Hamgyeongnam-do and his wife was buried in Sulleung, Heungnam-si, Hamgyeongnam-do.

== Family ==
- Father: Yi Haeng-ni, Ikjo of Joseon (조선 익조; 1236–?)
  - Grandfather: Yi An-sa, Mokjo of Joseon (조선 목조; 1204–1274)
  - Grandmother: Queen Hyogong of the Pyeonchang Yi clan (효공왕후 이씨; 1207–?)
- Mother: Queen Jeongsuk of the Deungju Ch'oe clan (1232 – 20 September ?)
  - Grandfather: Ch'oe Ki-yŏl, Prince Anbyeon (최기열 안변군; 1205–?)
- Wives and their Children(s):
1. Queen Gyeongsun of the Munju Pak clan (경순왕후 박씨; 1268–?)
  1. Princess Munhye (문혜공주; 1283–?) – married Mun In-yŏng (문인영), first daughter
  2. Princess Munsuk (문숙공주; 1285–?) – married Kim Ma-bun (김마분; 1285–?), second daughter
  3. Yi Cha-hŭng, Grand Prince Wanchang (완창대군; 1287–?), first son
  4. Yi Pyŏng, Grand Prince Wancheon (이평 완천대군; 1311–?), second son
  5. Yi Cha-ch'un, Hwanjo of Joseon (환조 조선; 1313 – 3 May 1360), third son
  6. Yi Cha-sŏn, Grand Prince Wanwon (이자선 완원대군; 1317–1356), fourth son
  7. Yi Chong, Grand Prince Wanseong (이종 완성대군; 1320–1385), fifth son
2. Lady Jo of the Hanyang Cho clan (한양 조씨; 1304–?); daughter of Cho Yang-gi (조양기).
  1. Yi Wanja, Prince Bulhwa (이완자 불화; 1323–?), sixth son
  2. Yi Nan-hae (이나해; 1325–?), seventh son
  3. Princess Munsuk (문숙공주; 1329–?) — married Kim (김방쾌; 1326–?), third daughter
  4. Princess Munui (문의공주; 1331–?) – married Hŏ Chung (허중; 1328–?), fourth daughter
