= Queen Kyŏngsun =

Queen Kyŏngsun 경순왕후

Queen consort of Joseon (posthumously)
- Predecessor: Queen Consort Choe
- Successor: Queen Consort Choe
- Born: ? Hamheung, Hamheung-si, South Hamgyeong Province, Goryeo
- Died: ? Hamheung, Hamheung-si, South Hamgyeong Province, Goryeo
- Burial: Sunreung tomb, Majeon-ri, Hamheung-si, South Hamgyeong Province, Goryeo
- Spouse: Dojo of Joseon
- Issue: Yi Chahŭng; Yi Chach'un; Yi Chasŏn; Yi P'yŏng; Yi Chung; Princess Munhye; Princess Munsuk
- House: Munju Pak clan
- Father: Pak Kwang

Queen Kyŏngsun of the Munju Pak clan (Korean: 경순왕후 박씨; Hanja: 敬順王后 朴氏) was the first wife of Yi Ch'un and mother of Yi Jachun who would become Joseon's founder, Yi Seonggye's father. She was posthumously honoured as Queen Kyŏng (경비; 敬妣; lit. 'the respectful queen') at first.

== Biography ==
Lady Pak was born in 1268 as the daughter of a Yuan dynasty's Cheonho (천호; 千戶), Pak Kwang, Internal Prince Anbyeon (박광 안변부원군) who was a son of Pak T'ong (박통; 朴通). She later married Yi Ch'un with the couple having 5 sons and 2 daughters. After her death, instead of remarrying, her husband took Lady Cho (조씨), the daughter of Cho Yanggi (조양기), as a concubine.

On July 28, 1392, her grandson, Yi Sŏnggye established the new dynasty, the Joseon Dynasty. As the grandmother of the king, Lady Pak was given royal title of Kyŏngbi (경비; 敬妣; lit. 'Queen Kyŏng; Consort Kyŏng') and later on April 22, 1411, her great-grandson, Taejong of Joseon, gave her a posthumous name Queen Kyŏngsun (경순왕후; 敬順王后). Her tomb was located in Sulleung, Heungnam-si, South Hamgyeong Province.

== Family ==
- Father - Pak Kwang (박광; 朴光; 1240–?)
- Husband - Yi Ch'un, Tojo of Joseon (도조 조선; 1265–1342)
- Issue
  - Daughter - Princess Munhye (문혜공주; 1283–?)
  - Daughter - Princess Munsuk (문숙공주; 1285–?)
  - Son - Yi Chahŭng, Grand Prince Wanch'ang (완창대군; 1287–?)
  - Son - Yi Py'ŏng, Grand Prince Wancheon (완천대군 이평; 1311-?)
  - Son - Yi Chach'un, Hwanjo of Joseon (환조 조선; 1313 – 3 May 1360)
  - Son - Yi Chasŏn, Grand Prince Wanwon (완원대군; 1317–1356)
  - Son - Yi Chong, Grand Prince Wanseong (완성대군 이종; 1320–1385)
