= Political factions of Joseon =

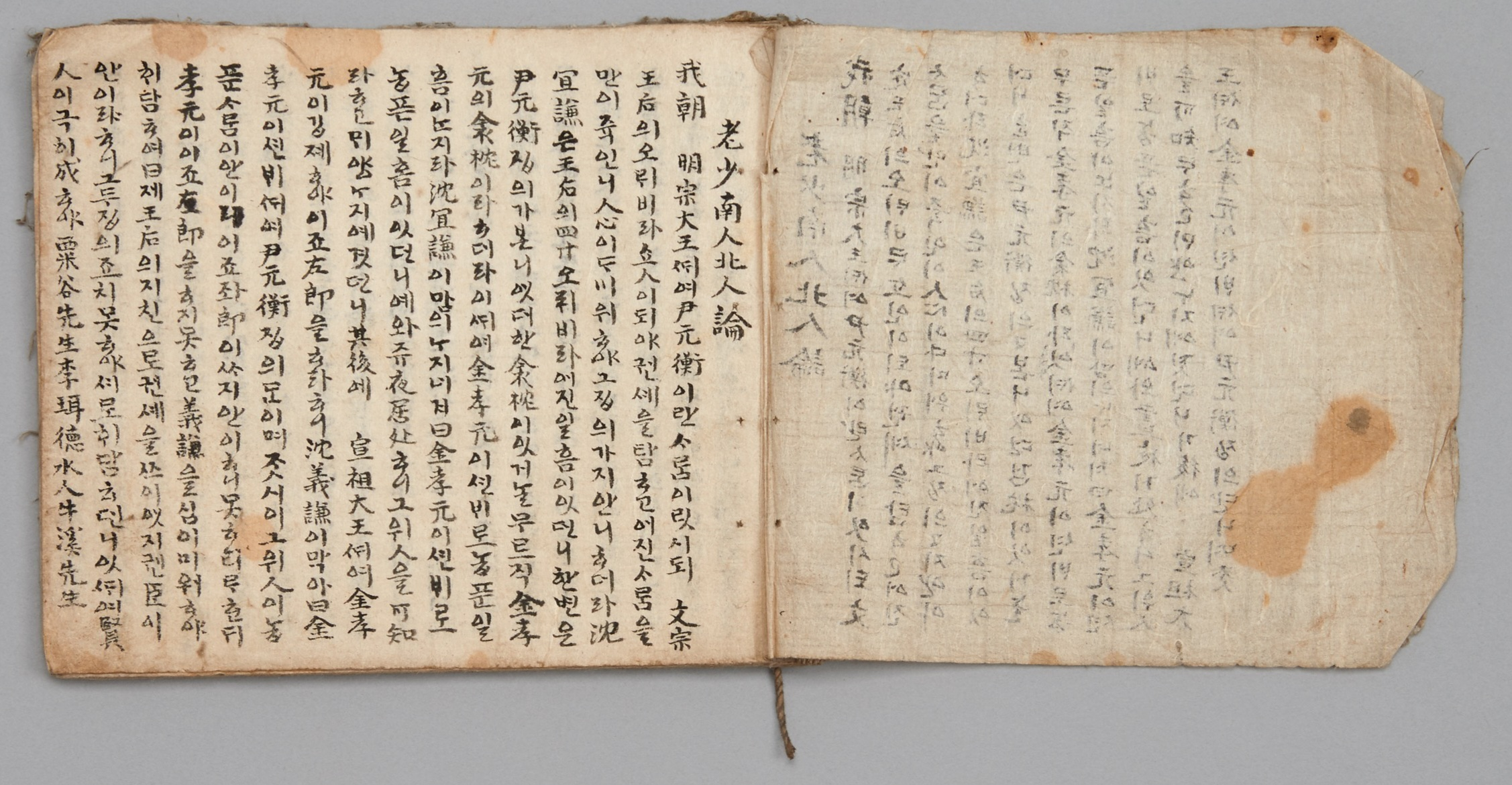
- Book describing the Northerners and Southerners, c. 19th century

Korean name
- Hangul: 붕당
- Hanja: 朋黨
- Revised Romanization: Bungdang
- McCune–Reischauer: Pungtang

The Bungdang (Korean: 붕당; Hanja: 朋黨) refers to the political factionalism that was characteristic of the middle and late Joseon period of dynastic Korea. Throughout this stretch of time, various regional and ideological factions struggled for supremacy.

== History ==
During the 15th and 16th centuries, national politics were dominated by tensions between the meritorious officials of the Hungu faction in the capital and the scholars of the Sarim faction based in Yeongnam, which culminated in a series of purges between 1498 and 1545 in which the Sarim were persecuted by the Hungu. Following these setbacks, the Sarim faction withdrew to rural provinces where they maintained their power base and ideological continuity through seowon (private institutions which combined the functions of a Confucian shrine and a preparatory academy for the civil service examination) and hyangyak (a system of social contract that gave local autonomy to villages). Village seowon often reflected the factional alignment of the local elite. Ultimately, the Hungu faction declined without an ideological successor, while the Sarim faction emerged as the dominant faction during the reign of King Seonjo (r. 1567–1608).

In the late 16th century, a nationwide split occurred within the Sarim, bringing into existence the Westerners (Seoin) and the Easterners (Dongin), composed mainly of the younger generation. Political divisions intensified further as in turn the Easterners soon split into the pragmatic Northerners (Bugin) and the dogmatic Southerners (Namin), and the Westerners split into the Noron (Old Doctrine) and the Soron (Young Doctrine). These four factions are sometimes known as sasaek dangpa (사색당파) or simply sasaek (사색; lit. ''four colors'') , as they were represented by red, white, black, and green.

The Northerners split into the Greater Northerners (대북) and the Lesser Northerners (소북) in the early 17th century; both factions would divide further into Flesh Northerners (육북), Bone Northerners (골북), and Middle Northerners (중북), and Pure Lesser Northerners (청소북) and Impure Lesser Northerners (탁소북), respectively. The Southerners then split into the Pure Southerners (청남) and the Impure Southerners (탁남) in the late 17th century.

Before the Noron–Soron division, the Westerners first split into the Meritorious Westerners (갑인예송), comprising those who had participated in the Injo Restoration (인조반정), and the Pure Westerners (갑인예송). The main cliques of the Meritorious Westerners were the Wondang (원당; lit. ''Won Party'') led by Wŏn Tup'yo (원두표) and the Nakdang (낙당; lit. ''Nak Party'') of Kim Chajŏm. The Pure Westerners separated into the reclusive scholars' Sandang (산당; lit. ''Mountain Party''), from which the Noron and Soron developed, and the Handang (한당; lit. ''Han River Party'') of the reform-minded capital aristocrats.

These divisions grew out of allegiance to conflicting philosophical schools and regional differences. The Easterners were largely based in Yeongnam; as for its subfactions, the Southerners were mainly followers of Yi Hwang, while the Northerners coalesced around the school of Cho Sik. The Westerners were based in Gyeonggi and Hoseo (Giho), and were largely followers of Yi I; followers of Sŏng Hon then formed the Soron, while Song Siyŏl's followers became the Noron. The divisions were often further driven by questions concerning royal succession or appropriate royal conduct. For example, the split between the Greater and Lesser Northerners was driven by debate over the rightful successor to King Seonjo. The Lesser Northerners supported Grand Prince Yeongchang; the Greater Northerners supported Gwanghaegun, and accordingly, they flourished during his reign (1608–1623), but were swept from power by the Westerners after the coup d'état led by King Injo (r. 1623–1649).

Under the reigns of King Yeongjo (1724–1776) and King Jeongjo (1776–1800), a strict policy of balance was pursued, with no faction favored over another. Nonetheless, factional strife re-emerged during Jeongjo's reign. The Soron divided into the Junron (준론; lit. ''Unyielding Discourse'') and the Wonron (완론; lit. ''Rational Discourse''), while the Southerners split into the tolerant Shinseopa (신서파; lit. ''Trust The West Faction'') and the traditionalist Gongseopa (공서파; lit. ''Attack The West Faction''), driven by their contrasting stances toward the introduction of western learning, particularly Catholicism. The dominant Noron split into the hardline Byeokpa (벽파; lit. ''Principle Faction'' or "The Intransigents") and the moderate Sipa (시파; lit. ''Circumstance Faction'' or "The Expedients"), two groups which differed in their attitudes concerning the execution of Yeongjo's son and Jeongjo's biological father, Crown Prince Sado. Eventually, the Byeokpa was eliminated by the Sipa in 1804, marking the conclusion of the era of scholarly factions formed around philosophical and ideological beliefs. After the elimination of the Byeokpa, Joseon's political landscape shifted significantly, and the dynasty began to crumble as the dominance of in-law families ushered in the age of sedo politics (세도정치; lit. ''power politics''). For most of the 19th century, the (new) Andong Kim clan controlled the government, with a brief interlude in which authority shifted to the Pungyang Jo clan.

During Gojong's reign (1864–1907), real power initially belonged to his father, Grand Internal Prince Heungseon (commonly known as Heungseon Daewongun), who on one hand sought to reform corrupt institutions but on the other hand pursued a policy of isolationism, opposing the opening of the country to outside influences. From the 1870s onwards, Queen Min (posthumously Empress Myeongseong) became more influential and pursued a policy of cautious modernisation using Western and Chinese help. Her hegemony was opposed by the conservatives and reformists alike. In particular, the progressive Enlightenment Party sought to quickly modernise the country along Japanese lines. These factional struggles led to the Imo Incident and the Kapsin Coup, as well as increased foreign interference in Korean affairs.

== Factions ==
=== Division ===
- Hungu
- Sarim
  - Easterners (Yeongnam School)
    - Southerners (Yi Hwang)
      - Pure Southerners
      - Impure Southerners
      - Shinseopa
      - Gongseopa
    - Northerners (Cho Sik)
      - Greater Northerners
        - Flesh Northerners
        - Bone Northerners
        - Middle Northerners
      - Lesser Northerners
        - Pure Lesser Northerners
        - Impure Lesser Northerners
  - Westerners (Giho School)
    - Meritorious Westerners
      - Wondang
      - Nakdang
    - Pure Westerners
      - Handang
      - Sandang
        - Noron (Yi I)
          - Byeokpa
          - Sipa
        - Soron (Sŏng Hon)
          - Wonron
          - Junron

=== Leaders ===
- Easterners: Kim Hyowŏn (his residence was in the east)
  - Northerners: Yi Sanhae
    - Greater Northerners: Chŏng Inhong
    - Lesser Northerners: Nam Igong, Kim Singuk
  - Southerners: Yu Sŏngnyong, Hŏ Mok, Yun Hyu
- Westerners: Sim Ŭigyŏm (his residence was in the west)
  - Noron: Song Siyŏl
  - Soron: Han Taedong, Yun Jeung

== See also ==
- History of Korea
- Korean Confucianism
- Society of Joseon
- Politics of Joseon
