= Westerners (Korean political faction) =

1575–1683 Joseon political faction

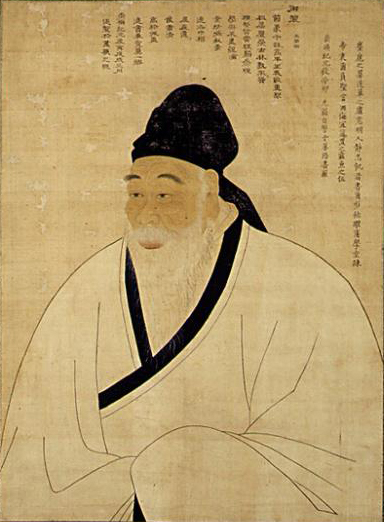
- Song Si-yŏl, one of the most powerful and influential Westerners. His strife with his student Yun Jeung was one of the factors thar led to the Westerners dividing into the Soron and Noron.
- Seonjo era leaders: Chŏng Ch'ŏl, Cho Hŏn, Sŏng Hon, Yi I
- Injo era leaders: Ch'oe Myŏnggil, Kim Chajŏm, Kim Ryu, Yi Kwi
- Hyojong era leaders: Kim Chip, Song Si-yŏl, Song Chun-gil
- Hyeonjong era leaders: Song Si-yŏl, Song Chun-gil, Kim Su-hong
- Sukjong era leaders: Song Si-yŏl, Kim Su-hang, Park Se-chae, Yun Jeung
- Founder: Sim Ŭigyŏm
- Founded: 1575
- Dissolved: 1683
- Split from: Sarim
- Preceded by: Sarim
- Succeeded by: Norons, Sorons
- Ideology: Philosophy of Yi I and Kim Jang-saeng
- Religion: Neo-Confucianism

Korean name
- Hangul: 서인
- Hanja: 西人
- RR: Seoin
- MR: Sŏin

The Westerners (Korean: 서인; Hanja: 西人; lit. 'West Person') was a political faction that dominated Korea in the 17th century. In 1575, the Sarim split into the Easterners and Westerners. The Westerners remained the main contender of the Easterners in the Seonjo age.

The Westerners lost power in the later years of the Seonjo age. The Easterners and the factions that split from the Easterners had power throughout the last decade of the Seonjo age and the entirety of the Gwanghaegun age. However, the Westerners ousted Gwanghaegun from power in 1623, making Prince Neungyang king and causing the Westerners to regain power, which they had lost for a generation.

The Westerners had power for half a century, from 1623 to 1674, in which they were relatively unified. The era also led to the appearance of powerful Westerner politicians such as Song Si-yŏl, Song Chun-gil, and Kim Su-hang, of which Song Si-yŏl was the most influential. the Yesong debate of the Hyeonjong era finally toppled the Westerner government, and a Southerner government ruled for six years, until 1680.

The Westerners regained power in 1680 with the Gyeongsin Hwanguk. However, there was a dispute between the younger Westerners and the older Westerners in 1682 on whether Kim Ik-hun, one of the figures who had brought down the Southerners in 1680, should be punished. The younger Westerners thought that Kim should be punished, while the older Westerners did not. When Song Si-yŏl took the side of the older Westerners in 1683, the younger Westerners were infuriated at Song. Those who wanted Kim to be punished became known as the Soron (young learning), while those who continued to follow Song became the Noron (old learning). With the Hoeni Dispute in 1684 between the Noron scholar Song Si-yŏl and the Soron scholar Yun Jeung, the Westerners were divided forever.

== History ==
=== Division from Sarim ===
After the death of Queen Munjeong and her brother Yun Wŏnhyŏng in the late Myeongjong period, the Sarim faction, which had endured four literary purges throughout the sixteenth century, came to power as the dominant political faction. At the time, the Sarim were united as a single faction.

In 1574, the official Kim Hyowŏn was nominated for the position of Ijo Jeongrang, which had the privilege of promoting scholar-officials, including the next Ijo Jeongrang. However, Sim Ŭigyŏm, the brother of Queen Insun, opposed Kim's promotion on the grounds that Kim had often bribed Yun Wŏnhyŏng, who massacred many of the Sarim in 1545. Despite Sim's protests, Kim was promoted.

The next year, Sim Chung-gyeom, the brother of Sim Ŭigyŏm, was nominated for the next Ijo Jeongrang. However, Kim Hyowŏn, who had the right to appoint his successors, claimed that Sim was unsuitable for the position because he was the brother of Queen Insun (brothers of the queen were regarded to be more corrupt, as in the Yun Wŏnhyŏng example). Yi Pal became the next Ijo Jeongrang.

The incident resulted in a large political debate on whether Kim Hyowŏn's actions were just, titled the Eulhae Dangron ('factional strifes of 1575'). Supporters of Kim included Kim Uong, Yu Sŏngnyong, Hŏ Yŏp, Yi Sanhae, Yi Pal, Chŏng Chiyŏn, U Sŏngjŏn, and Chŏng Yugil, while major supporters of Sim were Chŏng Ch'ŏl, Yun Tusu, Pak Sun, Kim Kyehwi, Ku Samaeng, Hong Sŏngmin, and Sin Hŭngsi. The people who took the side of Kim became known as 'Easterners', because Kim's house was in Geoncheondong (now Inhyeon) to the east of Seoul, while the supporters of Sim, who lived in Jeongreungbang to the west of Seoul, became known as 'Westerners'. The controversy forever split the united Sarim into two opposing parties.

The Westerners of 1575 were the older members of the Sarim, who had taken office before the Sarim took power. Therefore, they tended to be more conservative, and they were more contemptuous of Easterner ideologues such as Cho Sik or Yi Hwang. The Westerners were by far the minority within government.

=== Dispute with the Easterners and Northerners ===
In the 1570s, the conflict between the Easterners and Westerners intensified, despite efforts by people such as Yi I or Sŏng Hon to reconcile the hostile groups together. However, because both Yi and Sŏng attempted to be completely neutral towards both parties despite the Easterners being much larger, the Easterners believed that they were biased towards the Westerners.

In 1575, Yi I was an advisor to Seonjo, and advised the king to send both Kim Hyowŏn and Sim Ŭigyŏm as officials in faraway counties. Seonjo followed Yi's advice and sent Kim as the governor of Buryeong, a small town approximately 650 kilometers northeast of Seoul, whereas Sim was made the governor of Kaesong, a major city 70 kilometers northwest of Seoul. This angered the Easterners, as it seemed as if Seonjo was taking Sim's side. Thus to reconcile the Easterners, Yi I claimed Kim had a serious disease, unsuitable as a governor of the far north. Seonjo then moved Kim as a governor of Samcheok, a town slightly larger than Buryeong, 150 kilometers to the east of Seoul.

However, the Easterners, who were by far the majority in court, were not pleased that Yi I was apparently neutral in the conflict, when they believed that Sim Ŭigyŏm had clearly wronged. However, Yi I believed that both Kim and Sim had done both good and bad things, and thus that being neutral was the most logical position. Yi I therefore believed that both sides were equal in their deeds and misdeeds.

Despite his beliefs, Yi I began to worry that his attempts at reconciliation were meaningless because the Easterners still saw him as biased towards the Westerners. To do so, he wrote an advice for the king to fire Sim Ŭigyŏm and gave it to the Easterner Chŏng Inhong, asking him to not change anything in the advice. However, Chŏng added the single sentence "gathers other officials to create a faction" in the list of Sim's misdeeds in the advice. When Seonjo asked Chŏng who "the other officials" were, Chŏng replied that it was Chŏng Ch'ŏl and the Yun Tusu and Yun Kŭnsu brothers, who were at the time the sole Westerners in court. Yi I was angered that Chŏng had changed the words of his advice, forcing Chŏng to revoke his former words by saying that though Chŏng Ch'ŏl had done much wrong, he did not create a faction. He then retired to his hometown, causing the Easterners to be furious at Yi I. Both Yi I and Chŏng Ch'ŏl were forced to step down, while Sim Ŭigyŏm stayed in court. (Note: Chŏng Inhong also did not return, and later led the Righteous Army in the Imjin War. He grew to an enormous influence in the Gwanghaegun era.) Despite Yi's later return, the outnumbered Westerners were powerless to stop the Easterners, leading to an Easterner government until 1589.

In October 1589, the Westerners Han Chun, Pak Ch'unggan, Yi Ch'uk, and Han Ŭngin claimed that the Easterner scholar Chŏng Yŏrip was secretly plotting to be king himself. Chŏng fled to the nearby Juk Island without destroying his letters or books and performed suicide. The supposed treason of Chŏng opened a chance for the Westerners to regain their power. Seonjo made the Westerner Chŏng Ch'ŏl oversee the investigation of the treason, and the Westerners, who had lost power for a decade, were vengeful. The Yŏngŭijŏng (the premier) of the time, No Susin, was first sentenced to death, but was finally exiled due to his high status. The Ueuijeong,

Chŏng Ŏnsin, was exiled due to their connections with Chŏng Yŏrip. (Note: Chŏng did not destroy the letters sent to him when he performed suicide or was murdered, and the letters proved to be useful when searching out those who had been close to Chŏng.)

One of the most influential Easterners, Yi Pal, died under torture, as did his brothers. Chŏng Kaech'ŏng, the adopted son of the Westerner minister Pak Sun, was also exiled because he had betrayed his adopted father to side with the Easterners. (Note: Chŏng Kaech'ŏng was later central to the conflict between Southerners and Westerners) A highly controversial death was that of Ch'oe Yŏnggyŏng. Chŏng Yŏrip claimed the existence of an entity named 'Kil Sambong', who to lead the rebellion. (Note: 'Sambong' was the art name of Chŏng Tojŏn, at the time believed to have caused treason.) Despite the testimonies about 'Kil Sambong' not being matched on crucial topics like age, height, or appearance, the search for him continued. One of the Westerner advisers claimed that Ch'oe Yŏnggyŏng, an Easterner scholar from Honam, was in fact the 'Kil Sambong'. Ch'oe died under torture in 1590. Killing a thousand Easterners, more than the four literary purges combined, the purge furthered the distance of the two factions as eternal enemies.

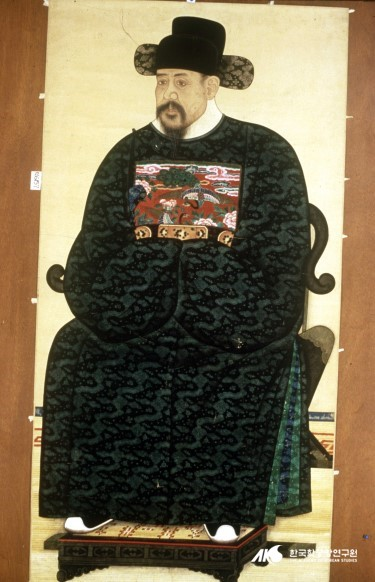
Yi Sanhae brought down the Westerner regime in 1590

However, the new Westerner government did not last for long. In 1590, the Easterners Yi Sanhae and Yu Sŏngnyong and the Westerner Chŏng Ch'ŏl were the highest officials, the Jeongseung. At the time, Seonjo had not appointed a crown prince, although he was already nearing forty and had many sons, of whom the eldest was Prince Imhae. (Note: Seonjo lacked legitimate sons but had children from concubines. Lady Kong was the mother of Imhae and Gwanghae.) However, Imhae, in contrast to the younger Prince Gwanghae, was a well-known troublemaker, causing most of the officials to believe that Gwanghae should be the Crown Prince.

However, Yi Sanhae knew that Seonjo was much closer to Prince Sinseong than to either Imhae or Gwanghae. (Note: The reason is because Lady Kong, the mother of Imhae and Gwanghae, died soon after delivering Gwanghae.) Yi also knew that both Chŏng Ch'ŏl and Yu Sŏngnyong wanted Gwanghae as crown prince, and that Yu was more cautious. Yi Sanhae so decided to bring down Chŏng Ch'ŏl and the Westerners by telling Lady In, Prince Sinseong's mother, that Chŏng was planning to kill her and Sinseong after he had made Gwanghae the Crown Prince.

Meanwhile, the Easterners Yu Sŏngnyong, Yi Sanhae, and the Westerner Chŏng Ch'ŏl promised each other that they would ask Seonjo to make Gwanghae Crown Prince together. However, Yi did not appear at the promised date (he claimed he was ill). The less-cautious Chŏng Ch'ŏl was the first to advise Seonjo to make Gwanghae Crown Prince, and Seonjo was infuriated, believing that the story told by Lady In was true. Seonjo exiled Chŏng Ch'ŏl and other Westerners recreating an Easterner government. Around this time, the Easterners split into two, the Southerners and the Northerners.

In 1592, the Japan invaded Korea with 200,000 soldiers as a result of Toyotomi Hideyoshi's attempt to conquer the Ming Dynasty. Because the Northerner-Southerner government had failed to prepare for the war, the Westerners became powerful again, though not as powerful as in the purge of Chŏng Yŏrip. The Westerners attacked Yi Sanhae for claiming that the king Seonjo should abandon the capital (which he did, fleeing to Uiju), and Yi was fired. (Note: However, Yi later returned.) The crisis of the Japanese invasion (they occupied up north to Pyongyang), however, caused a cessation of political feuds for a time.

With the temporary retreat of the Japanese army in 1595, political feuds renewed. This time, the Northerners claimed that Chŏng Ch'ŏl had killed Ch'oe Yŏnggyŏng for private reasons during the purge of Chŏng Yŏrip, and that Sŏng Hon did not save Ch'oe despite Sŏng's ability to do so. The Westerners refuted that Chŏng attempted to save Ch'oe. Seonjo took the Northerners' side, saying 'The evil Chŏng Ch'ŏl and the sly Sŏng Hon killed my just minister". The feud between the Westerners and the Northerners had ended with a Northerner victory.

With the Westerners gone, the Northerners removed the Southerners from the court and created a completely Northerner government in 1598. In 1599, the Northerners divided into the Lesser Northerners (of Nam Igong) and the Greater Northerners (of Yi Sanhae). While the two Northerner factions feuded, the Westerner remnants had little power.

In 1611, the Greater Northerner Chŏng Inhong ferociously attacked the scholars Yi Hwang and Yi Ŏnjŏk. Some Westerners refuted Chŏng's attack, but refutations against Chŏng were also done by the Southerners and Lesser Northerners.

=== Gain of power and the Injo era ===
Yi Kwi, who led the expulsion of Gwanghaegun.

Despite the Northerner government of the early seventeenth century, the Westerners still existed, led by students of Yi I or Sŏng Hon, such as Kim Jang-saeng. Meanwhile, some Westerners, notably Yi Kwi, Kim Ryu, and Ch'oe Myŏnggil, had low seats in the government.

In 1618, the Greater Northerners exiled Seonjo's wife Queen Inmok under King Gwanghaegun's support. Because the Confucian ideology of the time meant that the wife of the former king was regarded as the mother of the current king (even in the case that she was not the present king's true mother), the act was seen as a son exiling his mother, thus a terrible sin against filial piety, or hyo. This, along with a purely Northerner government that excluded other factions such as the Westerners or Southerners, caused Gwanghaegun and his Greater Northerner government to lose the support of the Neo-Confucian scholars and be thrown into isolation.

The Westerner remnants, led by Yi Kwi, saw Gwanghaegun's recent loss of support from the scholars as a chance for the Westerners to regain power, and decided to stage a coup to bring down Gwanghaegun. Yi plotted with his sons, Yi Sibaek and Yi Sibang, and they introduced their friends, Kim Chajŏm and Ch'oe Myŏnggil, to the plot. They also plotted with Prince Neungyang, whose younger brother had been executed by Gwanghaegun.

Meanwhile, another Westerner, Kim Ryu, was plotting with the general Sin Kyŏngjin to bring down Gwanghaegun as well since 1620. Sin made contacts with Yi Kwi and his followers, and Kim Ryu and Yi Kwi allied. The plot, however, leaked, and in 1622 the advisers of the king advised Gwanghaegun to torture Yi Kwi. However, Kim Chajŏm bribed Kim Gae-si, (Note: literally meaning 'Kim Dog Feces') a courtly maid who Gwanghaegun trusted, and she told Gwanghaegun that he should not torture Yi. Gwanghaegun, already cautious about the overly powerful Greater Northerners, followed her advice. (Note: Kim was executed on March 12 by Prince Neungyang.)

On March 12, 1623, Yi Kwi's forces gathered while Gwanghaegun was partying. Kim Ryu was late, so another general, Yi Kwal, took the place of commander until he came with his own army, and a guard who had joined Yi Kwi's plot then opened the door. Gwanghaegun was captured and dethroned two days later, and Prince Neungyang was crowned king the same day.

Although the Westerners had ousted the Northerner government of Gwanghaegun, they had not had power for a generation, and thus the early Injo (Note: As per the royal naming custom of the Joseon Dynasty, Prince Neungyang is hereafter called 'Injo'.) government required an alliance of various factions. The Southerner minister Yi Wŏnik became the prime minister immediately after Gwanghaegun's expulsion. However, power was in the hands of the Westerners; Yi Kwi was made the Ijo Champan (the vice minister of civil service affairs, who had the power to appoint people as officials), while Kim Ryu was made the Byeongjo Champan (the vice minister of defense), meaning that the Westerners were in control of both the appointment of new officials and the military.

However, the Westerner Kim Sanghŏn felt that Yi Kwi and Kim Ryu were living luxurious lives contrary to what Confucian ideals demanded, thus causing a temporary split of the Westerners into the Merit Westerners (공서, 功西) of Yi Kwi and Kim Ryu and the Clear Westerners(청서, 靑西) of Kim Sanghŏn.

In 1637, Kim Ryu suggested Nam Igong, the head of the Lesser Northerners, as the inspector general. The reason for Kim's suggestion was because the majority of the Westerners liked Yi Kwi rather than Kim, and therefore, for Kim to increase his influence, he had to ally with the Northerners. The younger Westerners, who already preferred the recently deceased Yi Kwi, who had died in 1633, to Kim Ryu, opposed Kim Ryu's suggestion, and the Merit Westerners split into the Old Westerners (노서, 老西) and the Young Westerners (소서, 少西).

In the later 1640s (the late Injo reign) Kim Chajŏm's power grew enormously because he supported the exchange of the Crown Prince from Prince Sohyeon's son (Sohyeon died in 1645) to Hyojong, and because he also supported the execution of Sohyeon's wife Lady Kang. Kim Chajŏm was pro-Qing, (Note: The Manchurian Qing Dynasty had recently conquered China) and the other pro-Qing ministers gathered around Kim as the Naktang (낙당, 落黨) faction. The faction was called 'Naktang' because 'Naksŏ' was the courtesy name of the leader of the faction, Kim Chajŏm, and the first syllable in 'Naksŏ' was combined with 'tang', meaning 'faction'.

The Naktang conflicted with the Wŏndang (원당, 原黨) faction, centering on Wŏn Tup'yo. The Wŏndang got their name from the surname of Wŏn Tup'yo combined with 'tang'.

So when Injo died in 1649 there were four Westerner factions in government, the Merit Westerners, the Young Westerners, the Naktang, and the Wŏndang. However, despite the division of the Westerners in the Injo reign, the era remained a Westerner one, with Southerners such as Yun Sŏndo excluded from the government.

=== Hyojong era and the emergence of the Sandang ===
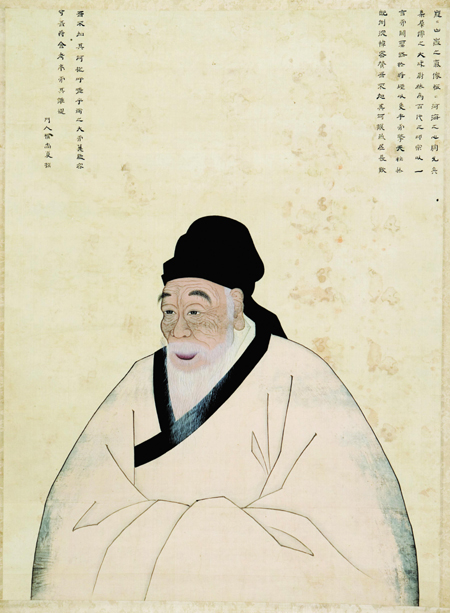
Song Si-yŏl, who was the most prominent of the students of Kim Chip

A day after his ascent to the throne in May 1649, the new king Hyojong invited the scholar Kim Chip and his students, Song Si-yŏl, Song Chun-gil, Yi Yut'ae, Yun Sŏn'gŏ, and Yu Kye.

Kim Chip was the son of Yi I's best student, Kim Jang-saeng, and was also the best student of his father, who was also a famous Westerner scholar. With the appearance of Kim Chip and his students, various Westerner factions, such as the Clear Westerners or the Young Westerners, merged into the newly formed faction of Kim Chip. The new faction of Kim, the most famous Westerner scholar of his time, became known as the Sandang (산당, 山黨), or 'Mountain Faction'. They were, as their name suggests, based on mountain schools, especially in the Hoseo region. (Note: The Westerners were focused on the Giho and Hoseo areas, whereas the Southerners were focused in the Yeongnam region.)

The new Sandang conflicted with the most powerful faction just prior to Injo's death, the Naktang of Kim Chajŏm. Kim Hong'uk of the Sandang began the battle against the Naktang by attacking Kim Chajŏm himself, and on September 13, 1649, influential members of the Naktang such as Im Chung or Yi Ch'ŏn'gi were fired at Song Chun-gil's request. Finally, on February 13, 1650, Kim was exiled to Hongcheon and his sons were sent to faraway places to serve as generals.

In 1651, Yeong-ui, a maid of Injo's son Sungseon, confessed that Gwiin Jo, a concubine of Injo and Sungseon's mother, had secretly done shamanistic rituals to curse the Injo's queen, Queen Jangryeol. Yi Yŏng, a county magistrate, had a father-in-law who was the cousin of Gwiin Jo, and also friends with Kim Chajŏm. Worried that the decline of the Naktang would influence his career, he revealed that Kim was secretly planning a treason.

Kim's son, Kim Sik, claimed that he had planned with generals and magistrates near Seoul as to kill Wŏn Tup'yo (the leader of the Wŏndang), Song Si-yŏl (the leader of the Sandang), and Song Chun-gil (caused the exile of Kim) and to make Prince Sungseon the king. Kim Chajŏm also confessed, saying that the plan was to revolt in March 1650, but that the exile of himself and the scattering of his sons had caused the plan to be delayed. Kim was quartered with his sons, as was the punishment for treason at the time, while Gwiin Jo was beheaded. The execution of Kim Chajŏm marked the collapse of the Naktang.

Meanwhile, the Westerners divided after the collapse of the Naktang. The new battle between the Westerner factions were between the Sandang and the Handang (한당, 漢黨). The name originated from the first syllable of the medieval name for Seoul, Hanyang, combined with dang. Unlike the Sandang of the Hoseo region, the Handang were rooted in Seoul, and valued practicality rather than Neo-Confucian ideals.

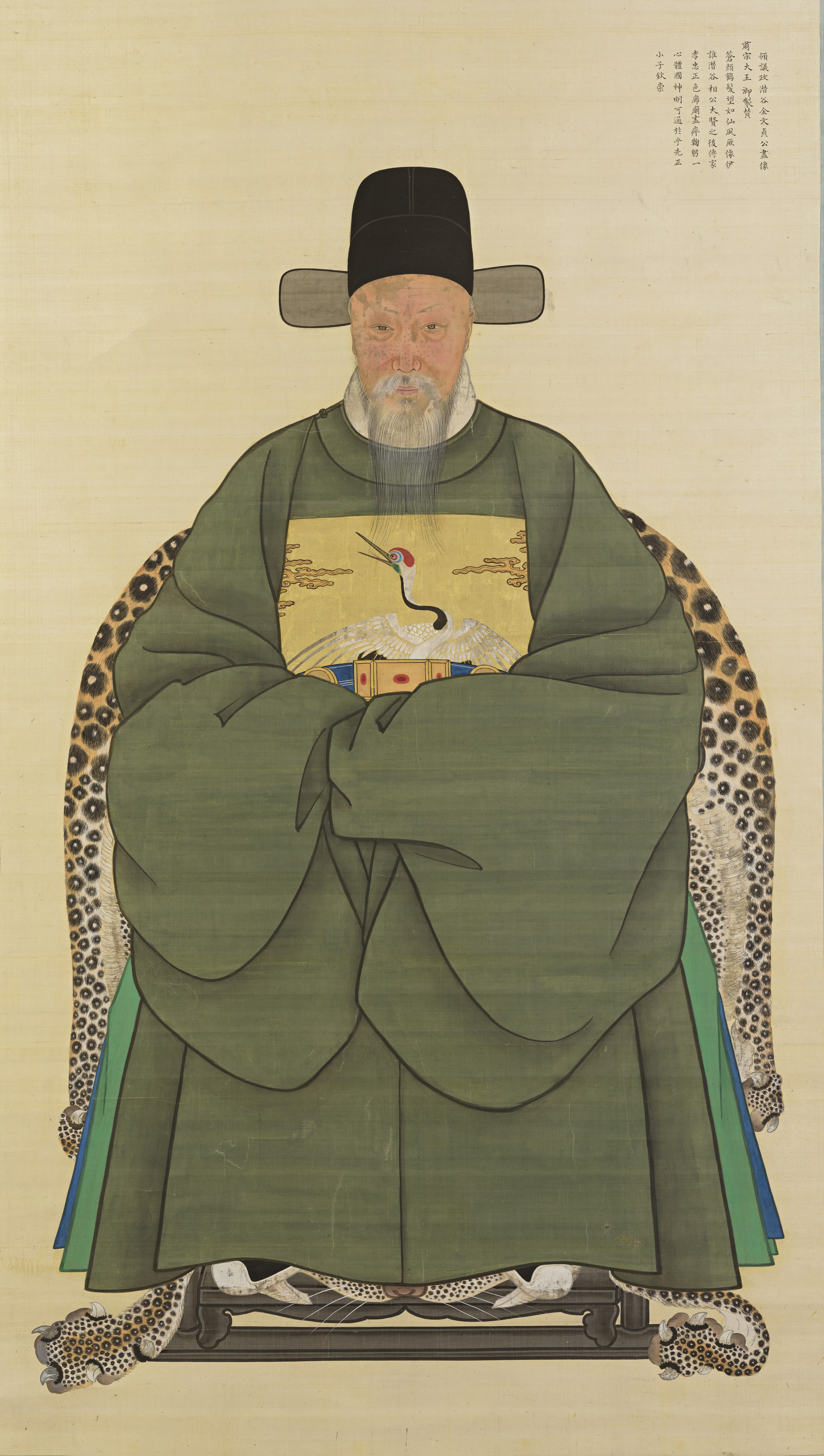
Kim Yuk, leader of the Handang

The leader of the Handang was Kim Yuk, a fierce proponent of the Uniform Land Tax Law. Taxes were originally paid in regional commodities, which were often nonexistent in the region. As a result, some people bought various commodities from different regions and sold them, lessening the difficulty of acquiring the commodities. However, the commodity sellers bribed the magistrate to accept only their products as taxes and raised the price of the commodities explosively, causing taxes to be much more costly than they were before.

Because the cost of taxes had risen astonishingly high, it was proposed that taxes be collected by rice (the vast majority of Korean farmers at the time grew rice, making taxes much easier to acquire), rather than regional commodities. The proposed law which enabled taxes to be collected in rice was called the Uniform Land Tax Law, and in the Hyojong era the law was already enacted in the Gyeonggi and Kangwon provinces. Kim Yuk proposed the law to have effect in the Chungcheong and Jeolla provinces as well.

Besides Kim Yuk, Cho Ik, and Sin Myŏn supported the Uniform Land Tax Law, and they formed the Handang centered on Kim Yuk. However, Kim Chip, the Sandang ideologue, said that the Uniform Land Tax Law was not a good law, and Kim Sanghŏn, Song Si-yŏl, and other Sandang members agreed with him. The resistance of the Sandang to the Uniform Land Tax Law caused conflicts between the Sandang and the Handang.

In 1656, Kim Chip died, leaving the Sandang to be headed by Song Si-yŏl and Song Chun-gil, who were called the Two Songs (yangsong). Within the Two Songs, Song Si-yŏl was considered to be a greater scholar than Song Chun-gil, and Song Si-yŏl naturally became the Sandang leader. Meanwhile, with the death of Kim Yuk in 1658, the Handang were led by Kim's sons, Kim Chwamyŏng and Kim Umyŏng.

=== Disputes with the Southerners in the Hyeonjong era ===
By the Hyeonjong era (1659-1674), the conflicts between Southerners and Westerners intensified with the Yesong Dispute.

The Yesong Dispute had its roots in Confucian philosophy. When a specific family member died, the rest of the family were required to wear mourning robes for up to three years. The problem was that the Chinese text Etiquette and Ceremonial and the Korean text Five Rites of the Dynasty dictated somewhat differently on the matter of sacrificial rites. The two texts dictated the following.

Situation	Etiquette and Ceremonial	Five Rites of the Dynasty
The mourning robes when the parent has died	Three years.	Three years.
The mourning robes when the eldest son has died	Three years.	One year.
The mourning robes when the second eldest son has died	One year. However, if the eldest son dies before the second eldest son dies, the second eldest son is called the "eldest son" and when he dies the parents also wear the mourning robe for three years. However, grandsons, Sŏja(generally interpreted as sons whose mother is a concubine, but there are different interpretations), or the eldest son who has a serious disease or a problematic behavior cannot be called an "eldest son".	One year.
The mourning robes when the wife of the eldest son has died	One year.	One year.
The mourning robes when other daughters-in-law have died	Nine months.	Nine months.

Injo's wife, Grand Queen Dowager Jaui, was alive in 1649. Although Jaui was not the birth mother of Hyojong (Injo remarried, and Hyojong was the son of his first wife), by the rules of the Joseon court, Jaui was the legal mother of Hyojong, and therefore Jaui had to wear a mourning robe for her stepson. Most Westerners believed that the proper time for Jaui to wear the mourning robe was a year, because Hyojong was the second son of Injo (the eldest son being Prince Sohyeon, who died in 1645.). However, Yun Hyu, a Southerner, believed that because Hyojong had inherited the line of Injo and because Sohyeon had died earlier than Hyojong, Hyojong was the eldest child by the doctrines of Etiquette and Ceremonial, meaning that Jaui should wear the mourning robe for three years.

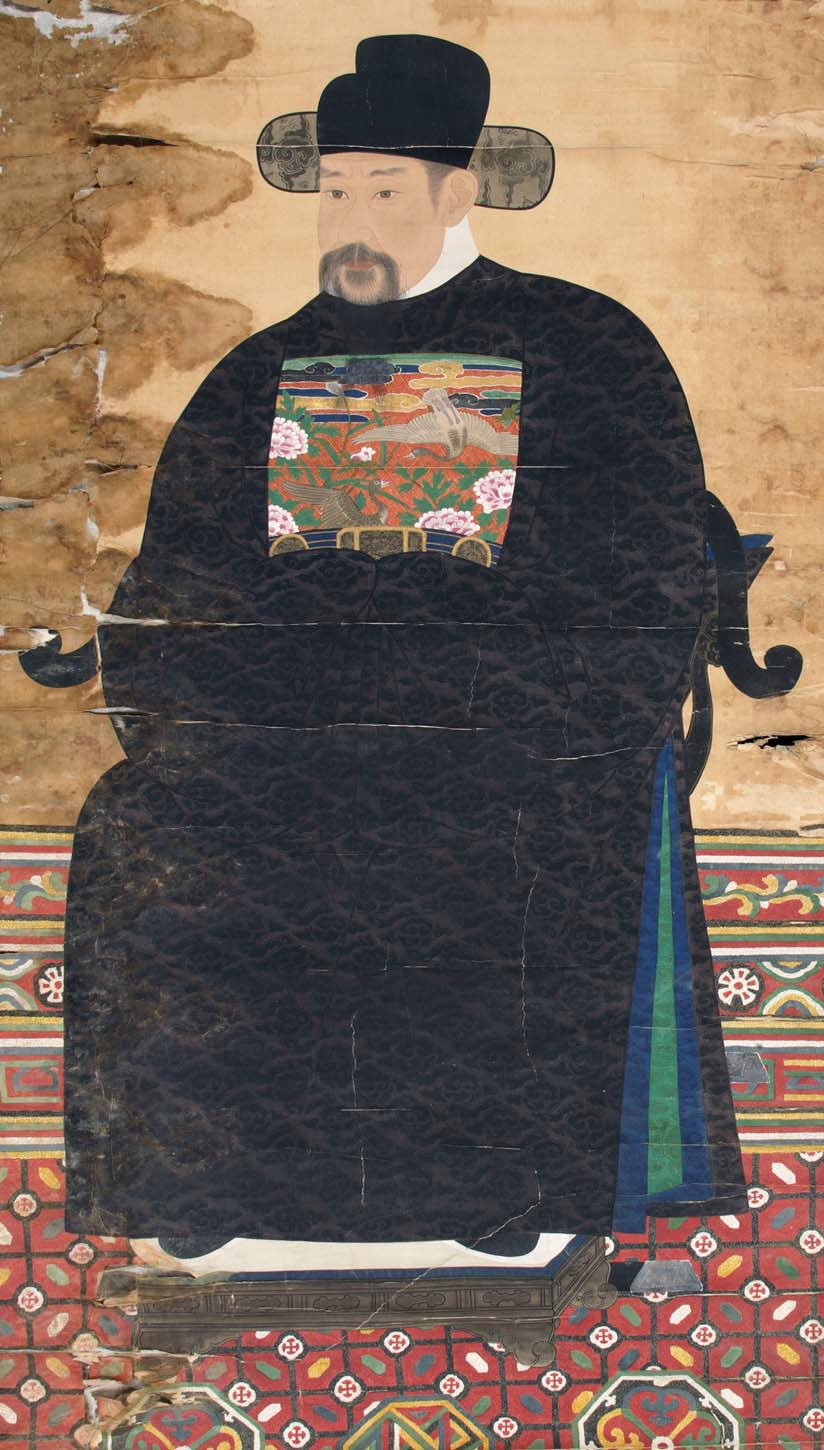
Yun Hyu believed that Queen Consort Jaui should wear a mourning robe for her stepson, Hyojong, for three years.

Song Si-yŏl, meanwhile, thought that Hyojong was a Sŏja, because Etiquette and Ceremonial said that all sons excepting the eldest son whose mother was not a concubine were called Sŏja. Therefore, Song claimed that Jaui should wear the mourning robe for a year.

Because Song Si-yŏl and Song Chun-gil had almost absolute power by 1659, the mourning robe of Jaui was decided as a year. But ten months later, in 1650, Hŏ Mok wrote an essay detailing the reasons for Grand Queen Dowager Jaui having to wear a three-year robe. Hŏ believed that the reason for parents wearing three-year mourning robes for their eldest sons was because the eldest son inherited the line of the father. Thus, the reason that the eldest son was special was not because they were the first male child, but because they continued the male line. Because Hyojong had inherited Injo's line, Hyojong's death required a three-year mourning robe.

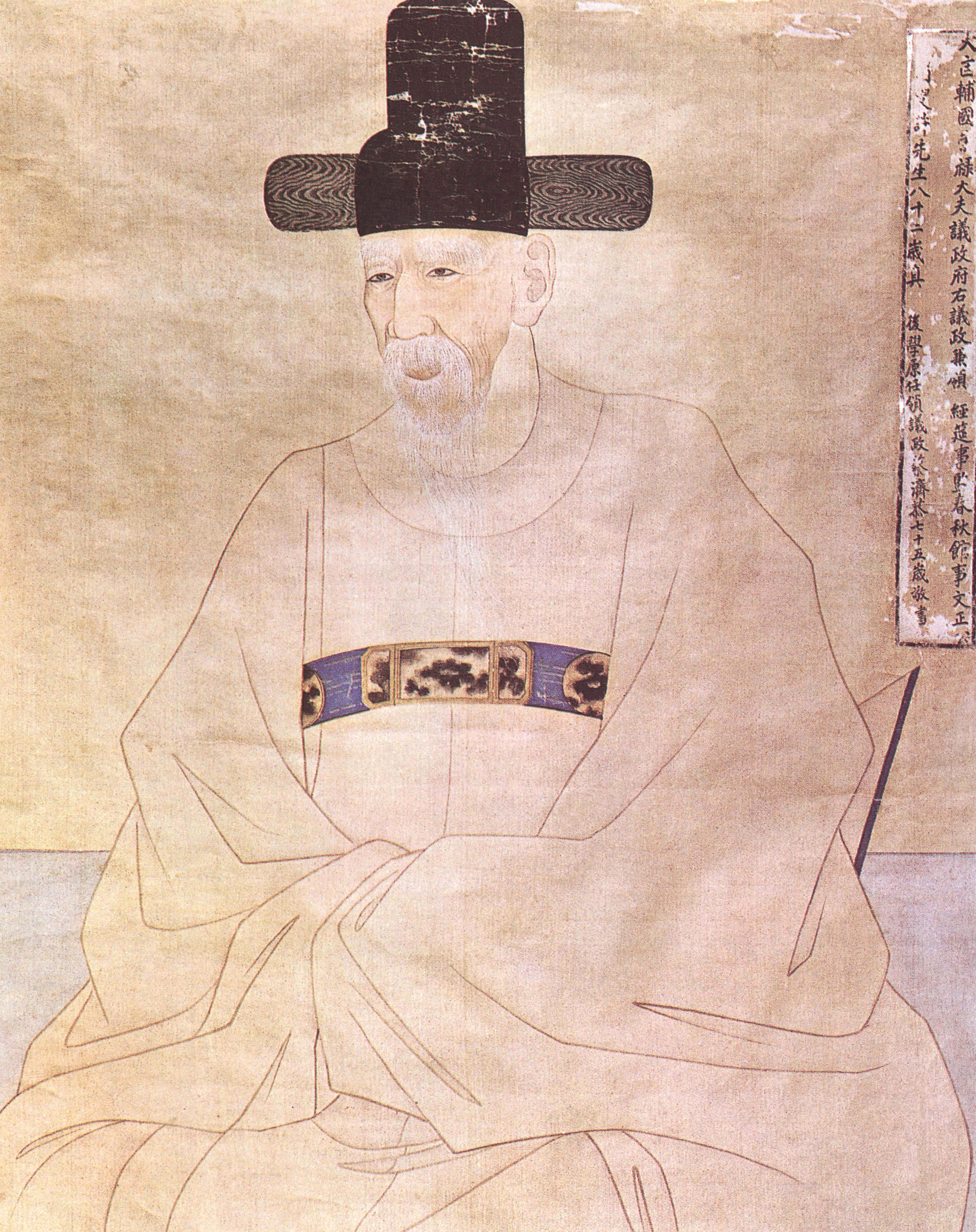
Hŏ Mok in 1677

In response to Hŏ, Song Chun-gil attacked Hŏ's beliefs by saying that if Hŏ was right, if the first, second, third, and fourth sons all died before the father died, with the older sons dying first, the father would have to wear three-year mourning robes for all four sons. He also promoted the definition of Sŏja as all sons other than the eldest son. Hŏ then rebutted his original statement by saying that the reason for a three-year mourning robe for the eldest son was because the eldest son generally inherits the line of the father, therefore meaning that if the second eldest son inherited the line, his death also merited a three-year mourning robe. He also said that Prince Sohyeon had remained a prince, but Hyojong had become a king of a nation, and as kings were higher than princes it had to be that the mourning robe for Hyojong had to be at least as Sohyeon.

The Westerner Wŏn Tup'yo agreed with Hŏ, advising Hyeonjong to change to a three-year mourning robe. Then, Song Si-yŏl attacked Hŏ himself, saying that there could logically be only one eldest son, and that Sŏja also had an additional meaning of all non-eldest sons. Song also said that the second eldest son being the eldest son referred to second eldest sons inheriting the line when the eldest son died in infancy or childhood (Sohyeon was thirty-three when he died), and that if Hyojong's death required a mourning robe at least equal to Sohyeon's because Hyojong was a king, then the death of any king, even if he was the son of a concubine, required a three-year mourning robe, which was against both Etiquette and Ceremonial and the Five Rites of the Dynasty. Hyojong then said that it was not right to argue that everyone ought to wear a three-year mourning robe for a king's death, because Grand Queen Dowager Jaui was a queen consort when Hyojong was only a prince, meaning that Jaui was above Hyojong in degree. He finally said that there was no great scholar to decide on the mourning robe, and that it was necessary to do what was certain (The Five Rites) and leave the decision of what was right or wrong to the future.

Then, Yun Sŏndo, an influential Southerner, replied. He first said that the Etiquette and Ceremonial directly said that the death of sons who are not the eldest but inherit the line also require mourning robes for three years, and therefore that it was unnecessary to bring up the term Sŏja. He then said that it was illogical that a second son whose mother was not a concubine and who had inherited the father's line and become a king would never be a true inheritor of the line, and sarcastily asked if a king who was a second son was a "false crown prince" and a "regent emperor", and if the second son could not "reign as king to the descendants of the first son". He finally said that the title of "Crown Prince" was equivalent to the eldest prince, and therefore Hyojong was the eldest son, whose death required a three-year robe. He then attacked Song Si-yŏl's argument based on the impossibility of two eldest sons, saying that all that meant was that there could not be two eldest sons at the same time. He then attacked Song's claim that it was unnatural for Jaui, of a higher rank than Hyojong, was to wear a mourning robe that children wore for parents by pointing out that it was just as unnatural for parents to wear three-year mourning robes at their eldest son's death. He finally said that he was not a wise person and that it was natural for some contradictions to occur in his argument, but that if his argument was logical it was naturally true.

Hyojong, who was wary of the power of the Sandang, ordered a low level of punishment; stripping him of his honors and sending him back to the country. However, the Sandang continued their attack against Yun, and Hyeonjong was forced to imprison him in Samsu, near the northern border. Yun's attack was burned. (Note: However, it was copied in the Annals of the Joseon Dynasty and still remains.)

However, many of the philosophers and scholars of the day supported Yun's opinions. Six days before Yun's exile, Kwŏn Si, a friend of Song Si-yŏl, said that "Although I am soaked with sweat at the sight of Yun's writing", "there is no doubt that Grand Queen Dowager ought to wear a three-year robe." Wŏn Tup'yo, still an influential figure in the court, also supported the Southerners. (Note: Note that Won also supported Hŏ Mok.) The matter was brought to court on May 3, 1660, and as Yun Hyu, the Southerner who had brought the matter up in the first place, only said "In this great event each man, great and small, had his own thoughts on the matter and so Your Majesty must decide with your wisdom." while the other, Westerner ministers supported Song, the Southerner opinion was discarded.
