= Sarim =

Joseon literati political faction

- Hangul: 사림
- Hanja: 士林
- Lit.: forest of scholars
- RR: sarim
- MR: sarim

The Sarim (Korean: 사림; Hanja: 士林), sometimes spelled Saarim, was a powerful faction of literati who emerged in the Early Joseon period under Kil Chae, and would later come to dominate Middle and Late Joseon politics in Korea. After outliving the Hungu faction, the Sarim faction experienced several breakups during and after the reign of King Seonjo (1567–1608) into the Western and Eastern factions; these factions would also experience their very own splits in the coming years. By the 19th century, Joseon court politics would see a shift in control from scholarly factions towards the 'in-law families'; for most of the 19th century, the Jangdong branch of the Andong Kim clan was in control of the government.

== History ==
=== Early beginnings ===
The philosophical lineage of the Sarim scholars originated from the neo-Confucian school of Kil Chae (1353–1419), a Goryeo scholar who studied under Yi Saek and Chŏng Mong-ju. After the fall of the Goryeo dynasty, he retreated to his home village refusing to serve the new Joseon dynasty despite King Taejong's request. Kil Chae concentrated on cultivating a new generation of neo-Confucian scholars including Kim Sukcha and his son Kim Chong-jik.

When King Seongjong (1469–1495) became the ninth king of Joseon, he invited Kim Chong-jik and his disciples, who came to be called Sarim scholars, to his court and supported their political growth. They primarily served in so-called Three Offices, from which challenged the entrenched "Hungu" officials, who accumulated great power and wealth by supporting King Sejo when he usurped the throne from his nephew.

=== Struggle with Hungu faction ===
In their conflict with the established Hungu faction, the Sarim faction suffered a series of bloody purges during the reigns of Yeonsangun, Jungjong, and Myeongjong. They enjoyed a brief period of power during Jungjong's reign through Kim Gueng-pil's disciple Cho Kwangjo, who pursued radical reforms to transform Joseon into an idealistic neo-Confucian society.

However, the Sarim faction, whose origin stems from denial of the legitimacy of Joseon dynasty, was vulnerable to Hungu's attacks because it questioned the legitimacy of King Sejo's usurpation and primarily engaged in the censorate role against the king and ministers. After four major purges that saw Cho Kwangjo and many others executed, the Sarim scholars again retreated to rural villages where they continued to spread their philosophy through local schools called seowon and maintained their power base through the system of Hyang'yak.

While the Hungu faction declined over the years without any ideological successor to replace it, the Sarim faction maintained its identity through the "martydom" of the earlier generation and came to dominate court politics during the reign of King Seonjo in the latter half of the 16th century. By then, Sarim philosophy coalesced around the teachings of the philosophers Yi Hwang and Yi I. From that time, the Sarim faction maintained political power for much of the Joseon dynasty.

=== Factional struggle ===
After the Sarim faction replaced the Hungu faction as the predominant political force in the late 16th century, a nationwide split occurred between the Eastern faction (Tongin) and Western faction (Sŏin). Political divisions intensified even further as the Eastern faction in turn split between the hard-line Northern faction (Pukin) and the moderate Southern faction (Namin) and the Western factions split between the Old Doctrine (Noron) and the Young Doctrine (Soron).

These factional splits grew out of allegiance to different philosophical schools and regional differences. For instance, the Eastern faction was largely Yeongnam-based, and its subfaction Southerners were mainly followers of Yi Hwang while Northerners coalesced around the school of Cho Sik. Gyeonggi and the Chungcheong-based Western faction were largely followers of Yi I, of which the followers of Sŏng Hon then split to form the Soron faction, while Song Si-yŏl's followers became the Noron faction. These divisions were often further driven by questions concerning royal succession or appropriate royal conduct. The factions were often named after the location of their leader's house.

==== Easterners vs Westerners ====
In the initial split of Sarim into the Western and Eastern factions, there was a large element of generational conflict. The Westerners were largely older Sarim scholars who had entered politics during Myeongjong's (1545–1567) reign while the Easterners, led by Kim Hyowŏn were mainly a younger generation who had become officials in Seonjo's reign and saw themselves uncorrupted by excesses of Myeongjong's era, which was marred by his maternal uncle Yun Wŏnhyŏng's corruption.

The Westerners were led by Sim Ŭigyŏm, Myeongjong's brother-in-law whose house was on the west of the palace. Although Sarim scholars were usually hostile to royal in-laws as a corrupting influence, Shim was Yi Hwang's disciple and protected Sarim scholars by impeaching his uncle who was planning another literati purge. In addition, many Westerners were disciples of Yi I and Sŏng Hon and followers of Giho school while many Easterners were disciples of Yi Hwang and Cho Sik and followers of Youngnam School. Easterners emphasized moral purification of the ruling class and rooting out corruption of earlier period while Westerners emphasized reforms that would strengthen the country and improve livelihood. (Easterners blamed Sim Ŭigyŏm's ill-willed opposition to Kim Hyowŏn's appointment at a key position in Ministry of Personnel for split while Westerners blamed Easterner's self-righteous attack.) Yi I attempted to prevent the factional split by appointing Sim Ŭigyŏm and Kim Hyowŏn to provincial posts far away from the court and arranging truce between Easterner Yi Pal and Westerner Chŏng Ch'ŏl. After Yi I's death, however, the conflict between two factions became more intense as the Easterners impeached Sim Ŭigyŏm and Chŏng Ch'ŏl, leading to their dismissal, and gained upper hand.

In 1589, Easterner Chŏng Yŏrip was accused of treason because he had formed a society with his supporters that met each month to study and receive military training. The history of the Sarim after its split is very complicated because there is a wealth of conflicting historical accounts written by each faction. This is especially true with what became known as Gichuk Treason Case of 1589 (기축옥사), the bloodiest purge in Joseon history by far. There is still a dispute about the nature and purpose of Chŏng Yŏrip's group of armed supporters and whether it was treason or frame up. His group was not a secret society as it helped the local government in the fight against the Japanese marauders. On the other hand, it appears that Chŏng truly had revolutionary ideas that were close to republicanism. He believed that the world was something to be shared and therefore could not have one master. His group, called "Great Common Society"(대동계), could be joined by anyone regardless of his social status, and it spread throughout Honam province and to other regions as well. Chŏng Yŏrip committed suicide after his arrest was ordered, which was considered the admission of guilt, and letters of Easterners were discovered in his house.

Chŏng Ch'ŏl, famous poet and head of the Western faction, was in charge of investigating the case and used his authority to start the widespread purge of Easterners during the Treason Case of 1589 who had slightest connection with Chŏng Yŏrip. According to Easterners' accounts, Chŏng Ch'ŏl tortured even 80-year-old mother and 8-year-old son of Yi Pal, leader of Eastern faction. According to Westerners' accounts, Chŏng Ch'ŏl tried heroically to save Yi Pal and Ch'oe Yŏnggyŏng from Seonjo's wrath. In any event, 1,000 Easterners were killed or exiled in the aftermath. It is also believed that Seonjo used this incident to weaken the Sarim's power.

==== Northerners vs. Southerners ====
This incident put the Westerners in power, but did not last long because of intrigue involving the appointment of the crown prince. In an Easterner plot to make it seem the Westerners were attempting to murder Prince Sinseong, Chŏng Ch'ŏl was exiled in 1591. Being the head Westerner figure in government, Chŏng Ch'ŏl's exile put the Easterners back in power. However the Easterners would soon split over the level of punishment of the now-exiled Chŏng Ch'ŏl, into the hardline Northern faction (Pukin) and the moderate Southern faction (Namin). The Northerners were largely disciples of Cho Sik and Sŏ Kyŏngdŏk and suffered more from Chŏng Yŏrip's "rebellion" while the Southerners were largely Yi Hwang's disciples and less affected.

The Southerners, led by Yu Sŏngnyong, were initially in power after Japanese Invasion in 1592, and maintained the policy of coexistence with Northerners and Westerners until its effort to reach peace agreement with Japan failed. The Northerners, now in power, split again over the proper successor to Seonjo, who had no legitimate son. Greater Northern faction supported Prince Gwanghae while Lesser Northern faction supported the newly born Grand Prince Yeongchang, with the death of Grand Prince Yeongchang and the dethronement of his mother resulting in the victory of the extremist Greater Northerners. During Prince Gwanghae's reign, Greater Northern faction split further and persecuted other factions until Southerners and Westerners joined their forces in a coup d'état that deposed Prince Gwanghae and placed Injo on the throne.

With the Westerners back in power, Joseon politics entered more stable stage in which they competed with Southerners in relatively peaceful coexistence for about 100 years. But under Hyojong's reign, the Western faction was becoming more powerful.

==== Sukjong's reign ====
In the early years of Sukjong's (1674–1720) reign, the Southern faction and Western faction clashed over the Royal Funeral Dispute, a seemingly minor issue regarding the mourning period for Queen Insun. The Southern faction claimed that the mourning period should last one year while the Western faction argued for a nine-month mourning period. A one-year mourning period meant that Hyojong was considered the eldest son while a 9-month period would suggest that Hyojong was considered not the eldest son, following the rules that governed the yangban class. In other words, the Western faction viewed the royal family as the first of the yangban class rather than a separate class for which different rules applied.

The two factions were also in conflict over the issue on fighting the Qing Dynasty, which was considered a barbarian government (as opposed to Ming Dynasty) that threatened Joseon's national security. The Southern faction, led by Hŏ Chŏk and Yun Hyu, supported war against the Qing while the Western faction wanted to focus first on improving domestic conditions. Under Sukjong's reign the factional fight became more intense and deadly since Sukjong frequently replaced factions in power with another one to strengthen the royal authority. With each change of government, which was called hwanguk (환국 換局), literally turn of the state, the losing faction was completely driven out of politics with executions and exiles.

==== Westerners vs. Southerners ====
Sukjong at first sided with the Southern faction, but in 1680, Hŏ Chŏk was accused of treason by Western faction, which led to execution of Hŏ Chŏk and Yun Hyu and purge of Southern faction. This incident is called Kyungshin hwanguk (경신환국). Now in power, Western faction split into Noron (Old Doctrine) faction, led by Song Si-yŏl, and Soron (New Doctrine) faction, led by Yoon Jeung. After nine years in power, Noron collapsed when Sukjong deposed Queen Inhyeon, who was supported by Western faction, and named Consort Hee of Jang clan (or Consort Jang) as the new queen. Western faction angered Sukjong when it opposed the naming of Consort Jang's son as crown prince. Southern faction, who supported Consort Jang and her son, regained power and drove out Western faction, executing Song Si-yŏl in revenge. This is called Gisa hwangguk (기사환국).

Five years later in 1694, Southern faction was planning another purge of Western faction, accusing them of conspiracy to reinstate deposed Queen Inhyeon, when Sukjong began to regret deposing Queen Inhyeon and favor Consort Suk of Ch'oe clan (Consort Ch'oe), an ally of Queen Inhyeon and Noron faction. Angry with Southern faction's attempt to purge Westerners, Sukjong abruptly turned around to purge Southerners and brought the Western faction back in power. The Southern faction would never recover from this blow, also called Gapsul hwanguk (갑술환국). Sukjong demoted Queen Jang to Consort Jang and reinstated Queen Inhyeon. Consort Jang was eventually executed (with poison) for cursing Queen Inhyeon after the latter died. Soron faction supported the crown prince, Consort Jang's son, while Noron faction supported Consort Ch'oe's son, Prince Yeoning (later to become Yeongjo). Late Queen Inhyeon and newly installed Queen Inwon were childless.

==== Soron vs. Noron ====
In 1718, Sukjong let the crown prince, soon to be Gyeongjong, rule the country as regent. He died in 1720 supposedly after telling Yi Imyŏng to name Prince Yeoning as Kyungjong's heir, but in the absence of a historiographer or recorder. This would lead to yet another purge which led to the execution of four Noron leaders in 1721, followed by another purge with executions of eight Noron followers in 1722.

Under the reigns of Yeongjo and Jeongjo in the 18th century, the kings pursued a strict policy of equality, favoring no faction over another. However, in Jeongjo's reign, strife re-emerged as the ruling Noron faction split further between the Byeokpa and Sipa, two groups which cut across the earlier factions and differed in their attitudes concerning Yeongjo's murder of his son, who was also Jeongjo's father.

=== Decline ===
The division and subsequent conflicts of these factions generally revolved around minor issues and reflected dogmatic and the rigid nature of their philosophical interpretations. Sarim philosophy, which was progressive in Cho Kwangjo's time, became very conservative and fundamentalist over time. The power struggle between these factions were marked by bloody purges with each change of power and resulted in a vicious cycle of revenge. The minor issues that divided these factions distracted the officials from real problems that affected the populace. Nevertheless, factional conflicts had some positive side effects as well. Compared to the late Jungjong and Myeonjong periods, corruption was limited since any faction engaged in excessive corruption would become an easy target for impeachment by its rival faction. Sukjong's reign, which saw some of the most intense factional struggles since Seonjo and Gwanghaegun's time, was one of more prosperous periods for the populace.

In the 19th century, Joseon politics shifted as in-law families rather than scholarly factions came to dominate the throne. For most of the 19th century, the Jangdong branch of the Andong Kim clan was in control of the government, which led to rampant corruption throughout the country.

== Factions ==
=== Philosophical lineage ===
- Yi Saek → Chŏng Mong-ju → Kil Chae → Kim Sukcha → Kim Chong-jik (Yeongnam Sarim) → Kim Koengp'il → Cho Kwangjo (Giho Sarim, Gimyo Sarim)
  - Yeongnam School
    - Yi Ŏnjŏk → Yi Hwang
      - Yi Hwang → Yu Sŏngnyong, Kim Sŏngil
    - Cho Sik → Ch'oe Yŏnggyŏng, Chŏng Inhong, Kwak Chaeu
  - Giho School
    - Sŏ Kyŏngdŏk → Yi I, Hŏ Kyun, Hwang Jin-i
      - Yi I -> Kim Jang-seng → Kim Jip → Song Si-yŏl
    - Sŏng Such'im → Sŏng Hon

=== Division ===
Sarim →

- Eastern (Yeongnam School) →
  - Southern (Yi Hwang)
  - Northern (Cho Sik, Sŏ Kyŏngdŏk) →
    - Greater Northern
    - Lesser Northern
- Western (Giho School) →
  - Noron (Yi I)
  - Soron (Sŏng Hon)

=== Political leaders ===
- Eastern: Kim Hyowŏn (his house was on eastern side)
  - Northern: Yi Pal (his house was below northern Bukak Mountain), Yi Sanhae, Chŏng Inhong
    - Greater Northern: Yi Sanhae, Hong Yŏsun, Hŏ Kyun
    - Lesser Northern: Nam Igong, Kim Sŏn'guk
  - Southern: U Sŏngjŏn (his house was below South Mountain), Yu Sŏngnyong →
    - Hŏ Mok, Yun Hyu →
      - Chŏng Yagyong
- Western: Sim Ŭigyŏm (his house was on western side), Chŏng Ch'ŏl→
  - Yi Haang-bok, Ch'oe Myŏnggil →
    - Noron: Song Si-yŏl
    - Soron: Han Tae-dong, Yoon Jeung

== See also ==
- Joseon Dynasty politics
- History of Korea
