= Easterners (Korean political faction) =

1575–1591 Joseon faction

Coordinates: 38°19′N 127°14′E

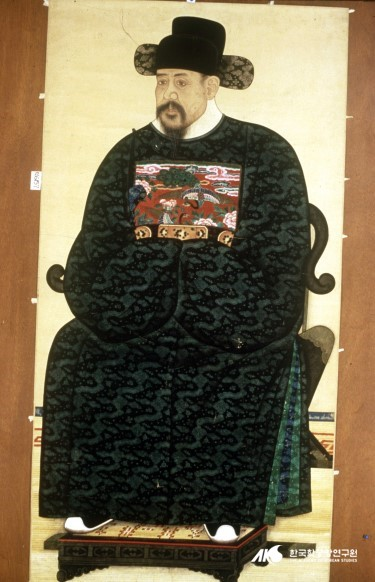
- 1570s leader: Kim Hyowŏn
- 1580s leaders: Yi Pal, Ch'oe Yŏnggyŏng, Yu Sŏngnyong
- 1590s leaders: Yi Sanhae, Yu Sŏngnyong
- Founder: Kim Hyowŏn
- Founded: 1575
- Dissolved: 1591 (Note: The division of Northerners and Southerners was a gradual process, with no clear date in which they could have been said to have completely divided. The extremists and the non-extremists existed far before 1591, but in the 1580s they are generally considered to have been united. Chŏng Yŏrip's Purge in 1588 could be said to have divided the Easterners, but the date 1591 is selected in this article because 1591 was the date that decisively split the Easterners in half, due to the controversy regarding the fate of the Westerner Chŏng Ch'ŏl.)
- Split from: Sarim
- Preceded by: Sarim
- Succeeded by: Northerners, Southerners
- Ideology: Philosophy of Yi Hwang and Cho Sik
- Religion: Neo-Confucianism

- Easterners
- Hangul: 동인
- Hanja: 東人
- RR: Dongin
- MR: Tongin

The Easterners (Korean: 동인; Hanja: 東人; lit. 'East people') were a political faction of the Joseon dynasty. This faction appeared during the reign of Seonjo of Joseon in sixteenth-century Korea, in 1575. Originating from friends of Kim Hyowŏn, they soon encompassed most of the disciples of Cho Sik and Yi Hwang, conflicting with Yi I and his followers, who formed the core of the Westerners. Though emerging as the dominant faction in the 1580s, it nearly collapsed at the suicide of Chŏng Yŏrip and the succeeding bloodshed in 1589. After Westerner Chŏng Ch'ŏl was exiled for attempting to make Prince Gwanghae the Crown Prince, the Easterners divided into Northerners and Southerners.

== History ==
=== Division from Sarim ===
After the death of Queen Dowager Munjeong and her brother Yun Wŏnhyŏng in the late Myeongjong period, the Sarim faction, which had endured four literati purges throughout the sixteenth century, came to power as the dominant political faction. At the time, the Sarim were united as a single faction. But this unity deteriorated during the reign of King Seonjo (1552–1567–1608).

In 1574, the official Kim Hyowŏn was nominated for the position of section chief of the Ministry of Personnel (이조정랑; 吏曹正郎; ijo chŏngnang) which had the privilege of promoting scholar-officials, including the next section chief. However, Sim Ŭigyŏm, the brother of Queen Insun, opposed Kim's promotion on the grounds that Kim had often given bribes to the corrupt official Yun Wŏnhyŏng. However, Kim was promoted.

The next year, Sim Chunggyeom, the brother of Sim Ŭigyŏm, was nominated for the next section chief of the Ministry of Personnel. However, Kim Hyowŏn, who had the right to appoint his successors, claimed that Sim was unsuitable for the position because he was the brother of Queen Insun (brothers of the queen were regarded to be more corrupt, as in the Yun Wŏnhyŏng example). Yi Pal became the next section chief of the Ministry of Personnel.

The incident resulted in a large political debate on whether Kim Hyowŏn's actions were just, titled the Eulhae Dangron ('factional strifes of 1575'). Supporters of Kim included Kim Uong, Yu Sŏngnyong, Hŏ Yŏp, Yi Sanhae, Yi Pal, Chŏng Chiyŏn, Y Sŏngjŏn, and Chŏng Yugil, while major supporters of Sim were Chŏng Ch'ŏl, Yun Tusu, Pak Sun, Kim Kyehwi, Ku Samaeng, Hong Sŏngmin, and Sin Hŭngsi. The people who took the side of Kim became known as 'Easterners', because Kim's house was in Geoncheondong (now Inhyeon-dong) to the east of Seoul, while the supporters of Sim, who lived in Jeongreungbang (now Jeongreung-dong) to the west of Seoul, became known as 'Westerners'. The controversy forever split the united Sarim into two opposing parties.

Most Easterners at the time of the Eulhae Dangron were younger officials, many having been officials only since the 1560s or 1570s. Moreover, they were generally students of Cho Sik or Yi Hwang. Therefore, the Easterners had a more liberal ideology.

=== Dispute with Yi I ===
In the 1570s, the conflict between the Easterners and Westerners intensified, despite efforts by people such as Yi I or Sŏng Hon to reconcile the hostile groups together. In 1575, Yi I was an advisor to Seonjo, and advised the king to send both Kim Hyowŏn and Sim Ŭigyŏm as officials in faraway counties. Seonjo followed Yi's advice and sent Kim as the governor of Buryeong, a small town approximately 650 kilometers northeast of Seoul, whereas Sim was made the governor of Kaesong, a major city 70 kilometers northwest of Seoul. This angered the Easterners, as it seemed as if Seonjo was taking Sim's side. Thus to reconcile the Easterners, Yi I claimed Kim had a serious disease, unsuitable as a governor of the far north. Seonjo then moved Kim Hyowŏn as a governor of Samcheok, a town slightly larger than Buryeong, 150 kilometers to the east of Seoul.

However, the Easterners, who were by far the majority in court, were not pleased that Yi I was apparently neutral in the conflict, when they believed that Sim Ŭigyŏm had clearly wronged. However, Yi I believed that both Kim and Sim had done both good and bad things. Sim had prevented a fifth purge of the Sarim (by chasing Yi Ryang and his followers from court in 1563), while Kim had helped form a Sarim government by introducing many new scholars into the government. However, Sim had interfered in politics despite his status as a relative of the queen, while Kim had been close to Yun Wŏnhyŏng despite his being a Seonbi. Yi I therefore believed that both sides were equal in their deeds and misdeeds.

However, Yi I believed that the fury of the Easterners had to be calmed. To do so, he wrote an advice for the king to fire Sim Ŭigyŏm and gave it to the Easterner Chŏng Inhong, asking him to not change anything in the advice. However, Chŏng added the single sentence "gathers other officials to create a faction" in the list of Sim's misdeeds in the advice.

When Seonjo asked Chŏng who "the other officials" were, Chŏng replied that it was Chŏng Ch'ŏl and the brothers Yun Tusu and Yun Kŭnsu, who were at the time the sole Westerners in court. Yi I was angered that Chŏng had changed the words of his advice, forcing Chŏng to revoke his former words by saying that though Chŏng Ch'ŏl had done much wrong, he did not create a faction. He then retired to his hometown, causing the Easterners to be furious at Yi I.

Both Yi I and Chŏng Ch'ŏl were forced to step down, while Sim Ŭigyŏm stayed in court. Yi I returned in the early 1580s (Chŏng Ch'ŏl also returned), and in 1582 declared himself a Westerner, revoking his earlier position as a neutral observer. However, the Westerners were no match for the Easterners, thus creating a solidly Easterner government in the 1580s until Chŏng Yŏrip's purge.

=== Easterner government in the 1580s ===
In 1584 Yi I died, only months after being recalled to court. Seeing Yi's death as a chance, the Easterner Yi Pal attacked Sim Ŭigyŏm and many of the Westerners. Chŏng Ch'ŏl, Sŏng Hon, and Sim were fired, creating a solidly Easterner government for five years until 1589. Yi I and Sŏng Hon were ferociously attacked by Easterners, often on the charges that they had attempted to create a faction. This was often refuted by the pupils of Yi and Sŏng, however they could not effectively oppose the Easterners.

The major seats in government, especially that of Yŏngŭijŏng (by No Susin), were taken by major Easterners. The more aggressive Westerners, such as Cho Hŏn, were exiled.

The Easterner government of the 1580s are often accused of increasing the damage caused by the Imjin War in the 1590s. Though controversial, mainstream historians generally believe that Yi I advised the king to prepare 100,000 soldiers against possible foreign invasions. However, this was refused by Yu Sŏngnyong, a major leader of the Easterners, because Yu believed that raising a large army would be harsh on the populace. However, Yi's worries were exemplified in 1592, when 200,000 Japanese soldiers invaded Busan. However, there is a theory that the advice was in fact a forgery invented by Yi's pupil Kim Jang-Saeng to make Yi I look wiser and to make Yu Sŏngnyong look foolish.

=== Chŏng Yŏrip's purge ===
Chŏng Yŏrip was originally one of Yi I's students, and was promoted largely due to Yi's recommendations. However, Chŏng grew increasingly closer to Yi Pal, a major Easterner, and by the 1580s Chŏng sided with the Easterners to attack the Westerners. This caused an extreme hate of Chŏng by the Westerners. The king already disliked Chŏng, and Chŏng was forced to retire to Jeonju.

However, even in Jeonju, Chŏng remained a powerful presence due to his friendship with major Easterners, especially Yi Pal, who had a powerful influence in both the court and in the Honam region. In Jeonju, Chŏng formed a slave's association called the Daedonggye (대동계, 大同契), which trained slaves archery and other ways of combat. In 1587, the Daedonggye was powerful enough to defeat a group of pirates when the Jeonju magistrate's governmental army could not.

Chŏng was also an ideologue, who believed that "the world is public property, with many owners", and that "Yao and Shun became great because they gave power to the talented and not to their sons." Both ideas went against the absolute monarchism of the Joseon dynasty.

In October 1589, the Westerners Han Chun, Pak Ch'unggan, Yi Ch'uk, and Han Ŭngin claimed that Chŏng was secretly plotting to be king himself, using the Taedonggye, and that he was spreading toch'am, a heretical ideology, to influence the populace. However, the validity of the claim has been disputed, especially the reason that a major Easterner like Chŏng would rebel against the Easterner government.

Seonjo ordered Chŏng to be brought alive. Chŏng fled to the nearby Juk Island without destroying his letters or books and performed suicide. However, there is an opposing theory, suggested by the Easterners ever since the purge, that the Westerners killed Chŏng and disguised his murder as suicide.

The supposed treason of Chŏng created a chance for the Westerners to regain their power. Seonjo made the Westerner Chŏng Ch'ŏl oversee the investigation of the treason. The Yŏngŭijŏng (the premier) of the time, No Susin, and the Uŭijŏng, Chŏng Ŏnsin, were exiled due to their connections with Chŏng Yŏrip. (Chŏng did not destroy the letters sent to him when he performed suicide or was murdered, and the letters proved to be useful when searching out those who had been close to Chŏng.)

One of the most influential Easterners, Yi Pal, died under torture, as did his brothers. The family of Yi had excelled in the courtly examination for eight generations, and the family was the most esteemed in Jeolla Province. Yi's eighty-year-old mother and his six-year-old son was also killed by torture a year later. Most of Yi Pal's nephews died as well.

It was also found that Chŏng had claimed the existence of a more influential entity in the rebellion, named 'Kil Sambong'. Sambong was the courtesy name of Chŏng Tojŏn, who at the time considered to be a treasonous subject. The identity or even the very existence of 'Kil Sambong' remained unknown. Though various testimonies about 'Kil Sambong' were told by Chŏng Yŏrip's acquaintances, the testimonies did not match at all on crucial topics such as age, height, or appearance.

While the identity of 'Kil Sambong' remained a mystery, a group of Westerners claimed that Ch'oe Yŏnggyŏng, an influential scholar of Jeonju and a major Easterner, was 'Kil Sambong', because he sat at the highest seat in an archery practice held by the Daedonggye. Ch'oe was brought before Seonjo, where he claimed that he had never had any form of connection with Chŏng Yŏrip. (Note: In fact, there was one letter that Ch'oe had sent to Chŏng. Ch'oe claimed that he had not remembered because of old age) Both Seonjo and Chŏng Ch'ŏl thought Ch'oe was not 'Kil Sambong'. However, Westerner pressure forced Seonjo to continue the torture of Ch'oe. Ch'oe died of torture in 1590.

The purge furthered the distance between Easterners and Westerners as eternal enemies, especially as up to a thousand Easterners were killed, exiled, or fired in the purge. (Note: The descendants of the Easterners fought with the Westernersuntil the Sukjong era, when the Westerners finally gained total victory in 1693) The deaths of Chŏng Yŏrip, Yi Pal, and Ch'oe Yŏnggyŏng, who were all from the Honam region, caused a distaste for people from Honam within the court; this has been claimed as one of the causes of the Donghak Peasant Revolution.

=== Regain of Power ===
In 1590, the Easterners Yi Sanhae and Yu Sŏngnyong and the Westerner Chŏng Ch'ŏl were the three State Counciliors - the Samjŏngsŭng (삼정승). At the time, Seonjo had not appointed a crown prince, although he was already nearing forty and had many sons. As his first queen was infertile he choice was to be done between the sons from concubines. The two oldest were from Royal Noble Consort Gongbin Kim. Prince Imhae, the oldest one, was known for stealing the properties of peasants, drinking alcohol, and being friends with gangsters. In contrast, the second-oldest son, Prince Gwanghae, was known for his intelligence and skill. Therefore, most of the officials believed that Gwanghae should be the Crown Prince.

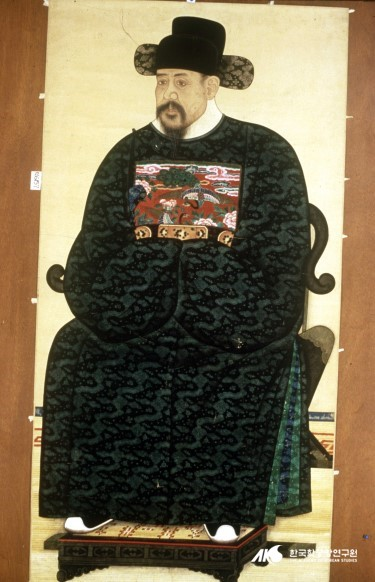
Yi Sanhae, who brought down Chŏng Ch'ŏl's Westerner regime in 1590

However, Yi Sanhae knew that Seonjo was much closer to Royal Noble Consort Inbin Kim and her eldest son, Prince Sinseong, over either Imhae or Gwanghae. (Note: The reason is because Lady Gong, the mother of Imhae and Gwanghae, died soon after delivering Gwanghae.) Yi also knew that both Chŏng Ch'ŏl and Yu Sŏngnyong wanted Gwanghae as crown prince. Finally, Yi was also aware that Yu had a cautious nature, while Chŏng did not.

Yi Sanhae so decided to bring down Chŏng Ch'ŏl and the Westerners. He told Kim Kongnyang, the brother of Consort In, that Chŏng was planning to kill Consort In and Prince Sinseong, right after he had made Gwanghae the Crown Prince. Kim told Yi's story to Consort In, who in turn told it to Seonjo.

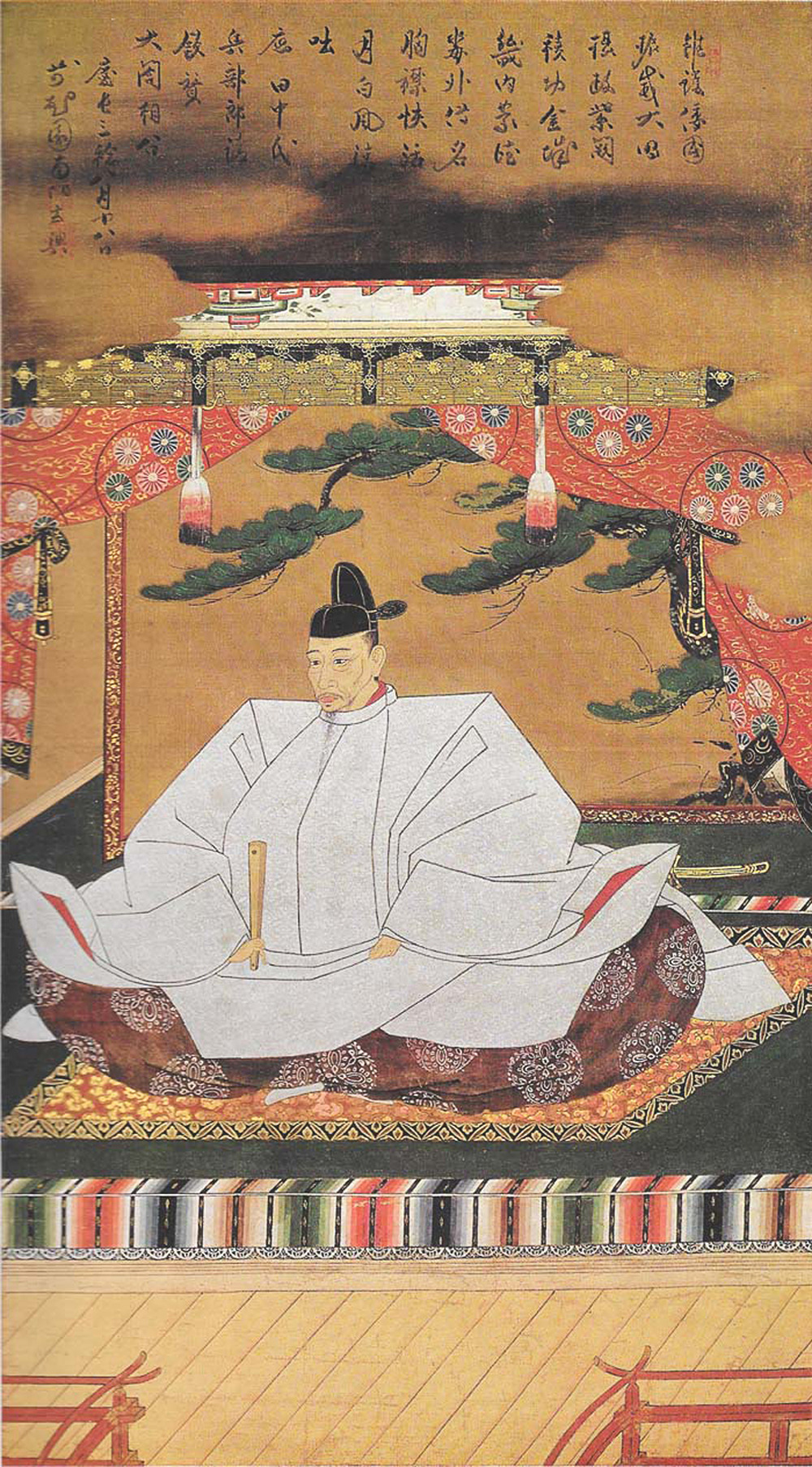
Toyotomi Hideyoshi, who invaded Korea in 1592

Meanwhile, the Easterners Yu Sŏngnyong, Yi Sanhae, and Yi Seongjung and the Westerner Chŏng Ch'ŏl promised each other that they would ask Seonjo to make Gwanghae Crown Prince together. However, Yi Sanhae did not appear at the promised date (he claimed he was ill). Yu Sŏngnyong was too cautious to bring the subject up, and Chŏng Ch'ŏl was the first to advise Seonjo to make Gwanghae Crown Prince. When Chŏng Ch'ŏl brought the matter up, Seonjo was infuriated, believing that the story told by Consort In was true. Seonjo exiled Chŏng Ch'ŏl and fired Westerners such as the Yun Tusu brothers, recreating a solidly Easterner government.

Meanwhile, in 1590 (when the Easterners regained power), the warlord Toyotomi Hideyoshi unified Japan, ending the Sengoku period. He had already been the most powerful figure in the archipelago since 1583. Toyotomi wanted to conquer the Ming China, using Korea as the main route, and in 1587 he asked the Joseon Kingdom for a safe route. This was refused.

Nevertheless, Toyotomi continuously asked the Joseon Kingdom to open such a route. Seonjo, worried about a possible war with a unified Japan, sent the Easterner Kim Sŏngil and the Westerner Hwang Yung-il to Japan as envoys. The Seonjo Sillok, compiled by Easterners during the reign of King Gwanghae, says that Hwang accepted so many gifts from Japan that his "pockets were full of money", while Kim refused to accept any form of gift.

When the envoys returned to Joseon, Hwang said that Toyotomi was "strong and fierce", and that it was almost certain that Japan would invade. Kim, however, said that Toyotomi was like a "cowardly rat" and that he would not invade. According to the Easterner Yu Sŏngnyong in his Jingbirok, the reason for Kim's saying that Japan would not invade was to stop the people from being frightened or rioting. Because Kim was an Easterner, and because Easterners were in power at the time, the court did not prepare for war. (Note: Individuals did. Yi Sunshin made the turtle ship, and various magistrates stockpiled weapons and supplies.) However, Hwang proved ultimately correct, as Toyotomi invaded Busan with 200,000 soldiers in 1592, and the unprepared government collapsed at the onslaught.

=== Division into Northerners and Southerners ===
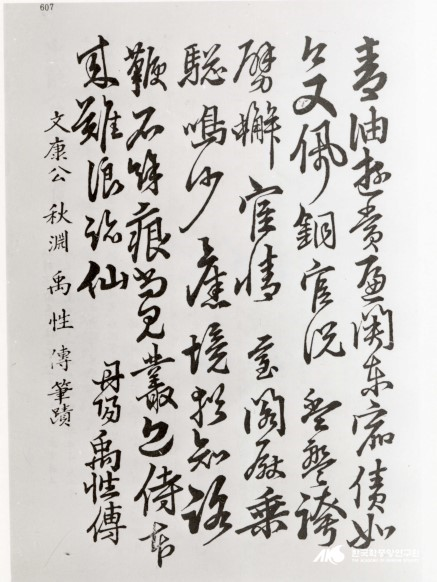
A page from a book written by U Sŏngjŏn, one of the most influential Southerners in 1591

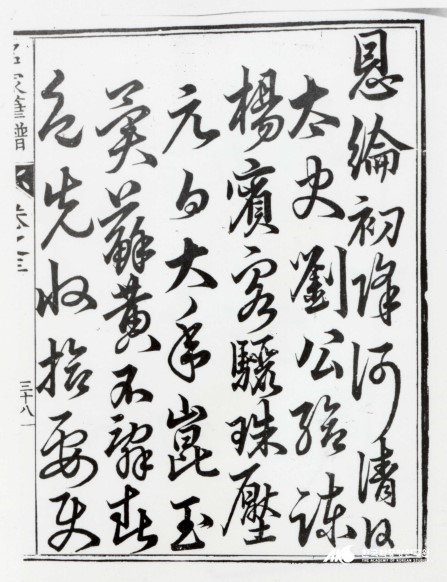
A page from a book written by Pak Sŭngjong, a Northerner who later became a Yŏngŭijŏng

Chŏng Ch'ŏl was fired with most of the Westerners in 1590, the Easterners differed on whether they should kill or just exile Chŏng. Most of the Easterners who wanted to kill Chŏng lived near Bugaksan (translated to the Northern rock), while most of the Easterners who opposed killing Chŏng lived near Namsan (translated to the Southern mountain). The location caused those who wanted Chŏng's death to be called the 'Northerners', while those who opposed his death became called 'Southerners'.

However, the dispute on whether Chŏng should die or not was the sole, or even the most influential, cause of the split. The students of Cho Sik had suffered terrible damages by Chŏng Yŏrip's purge, while the followers of Yi Hwang had not lost anyone. Moreover, Yu Sŏngnyong, the most influential of Yi Hwang's students, retained a close relationship with Chŏng Ch'ŏl, who led the purge. Thus, Cho Sik's students wanted to kill Chŏng Ch'ŏl more than Yu Sŏngnyong and other students of Yi Hwang did. Another cause for division was that Chŏng Inhong, the most favored student of Cho Sik, had a contempt for Yi Hwang and his pupils, who formed a large part of the Easterners. These differences within the Easterner camp led to the followers of Yi Hwang becoming largely Southerners, while the followers of Cho Sik became largely Northerners.

By 1598, the split of the Easterners had become apparent, with Southerners such as Yu Sŏngnyong being attacked by Northerners such as Yi Ich'ŏm. However, the Northerners were still closer to the Southerners than to the Westerners, and after the Westerners gained power in 1623, most of the surviving Northerners were absorbed by the Southerners.

== Ideology ==
The ideologies of the Easterners were very diverse, including pupils of Cho Sik, Yi Hwang, and Sŏ Kyŏngdŏk. The people who formed the Easterners were largely of the Yeongnam School of philosophy, which included Cho Sik and Yi Hwang. By contrast, the majority of the Westerners were of the Giho School of Yi Yi and Sŏng Hon. Later, as the Nammyeong School collapsed, the phrase 'Yeongnam School' became synonymous with the T'oegye School.

The Yeongnam School was divided into four:

1. The Yeong School was the oldest of the four, holding Kim Chong-jik as the founder. It was also the school that formed the basis for the other three schools. It held that Li, a concept of rationality in Chinese philosophy, was neither superior nor inferior to Qi, the material. The Yeong School formed the Sarim's philosophical basis.
2. The Nammyŏng School, founded by Nammyŏng Cho Sik, were the school of philosophy in Southern Gyeongsang. The Nammyŏng School disliked debates and discussions and emphasized action above discussion. The Nammyŏng School were the majority of the Northerners. The School was destroyed with the execution of Chŏng Inhong, Cho's best student, in 1623, and most of the survivors were absorbed into the T'oegye School, just as in politics the Northerners were absorbed by the Southerners.
3. The T'oegye School, founded by Yi Hwang, believed that Li (rationality) was absolute, while Qi (material) was relative (this, however, does not mean that they believed that the Li was in any way superior to the Qi). They also believed that the Li and the Qi were completely different, and that the human ethics were Li (rational), while the human emotions were Qi (material). The latter idea was attacked by Yi I, who believed that ethics were just a positive side of the emotions. The T'oegye School were the majority of the Southerners, and remained the contender of the Giho School to the eighteenth century.
4. The Yeohyeon School of Chang Hyŏn'gwang is often considered a T'oegye offshoot. He believed that Li was equal to Qi, and that ethics were also an emotion. Chang himself remained very close to Yi Hwang's pupils, and his students generally came to follow the T'oegye School.

== Legacy ==
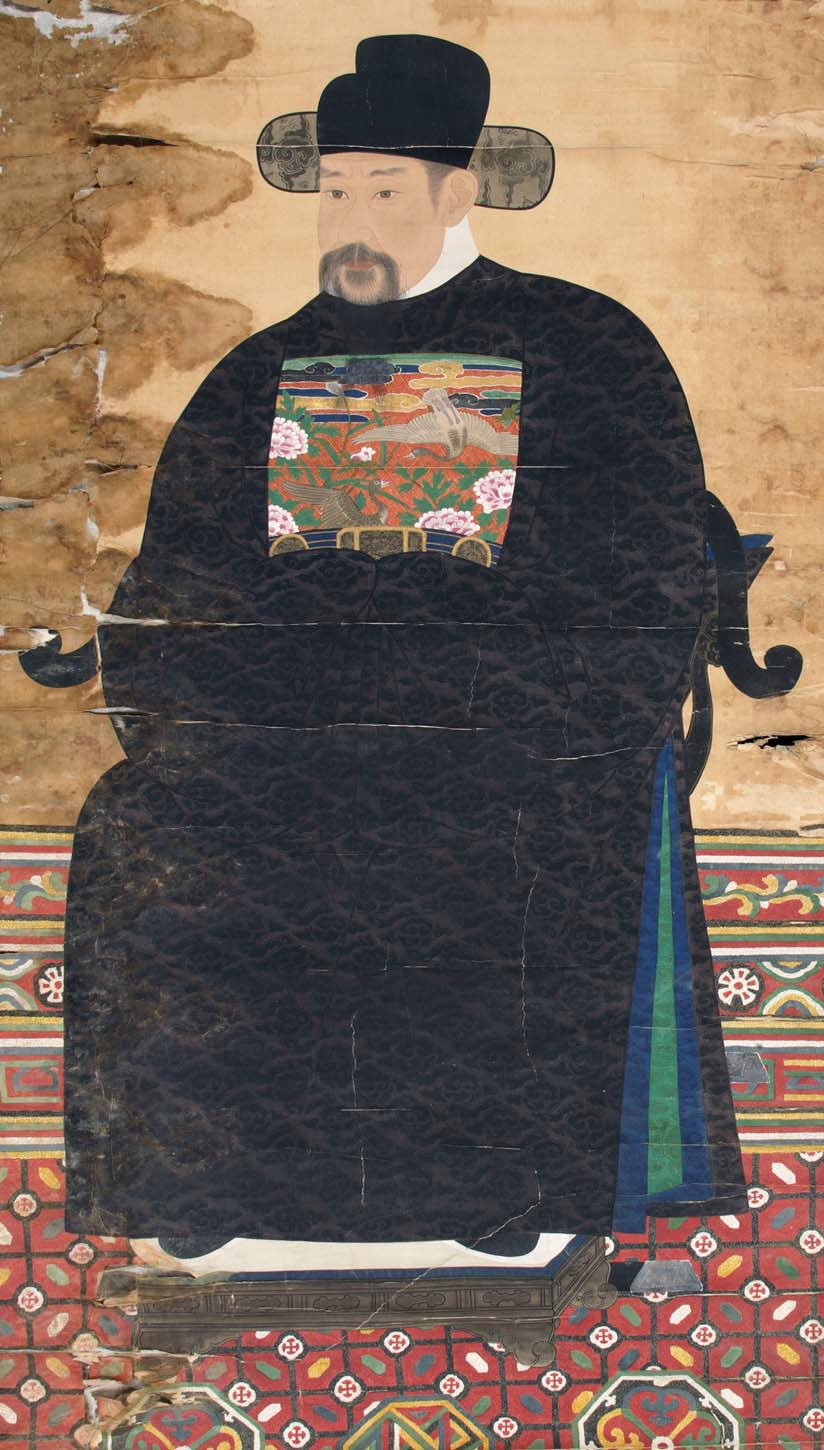
Yun Hyu (1616–1680), a major Southerner leader killed in the Gyeongsin Hwanguk

After the Easterner division, the Northerners gained power, and they themselves divided into the Greater Northerners (of, among others, Chŏng Inhong) and the Lesser Northerners (of, among others, Yu Yeonggyeong). The two Northerners battled throughout the last years of the Seonjo reign and the entire of the Gwanghaegun reign, though the Greater Northerners gained the upper hand with the imprisonment of Queen Inmok in 1618. However, the Northerner government was brought down when Gwanghaegun of Joseon was brought down by a coup from Prince Neungyang and the Westerners. Despite efforts by Nam Iung to revive the Northerners, they soon joined the Southerners.

Meanwhile, the Southerners remained an unimportant faction until the Hyeonjong era, when the Yesong debate enabled the Southerners to gain power in 1674, the first time that the Southerners were a majority in the government. The Southerners ruled as a majority faction until 1680, when the Gyeongsin Hwanguk occurred, killing prominent Southerners such as Hŏ Chŏk, Yun Hyu, and Yu Hyeok-hyeon.

However, in 1689, the Southerner concubine Royal Noble Consort Huibin Jang delivered Sukjong's first son, causing Sukjong to change the Westerner government into a Southerner one. However, the Southerner government was changed to a Westerner government again in 1694, and the Southerners never gained power again.
