= Yun Tusu =

Joseon scholar-official (1533–1601)

Yun Tusu 윤두수
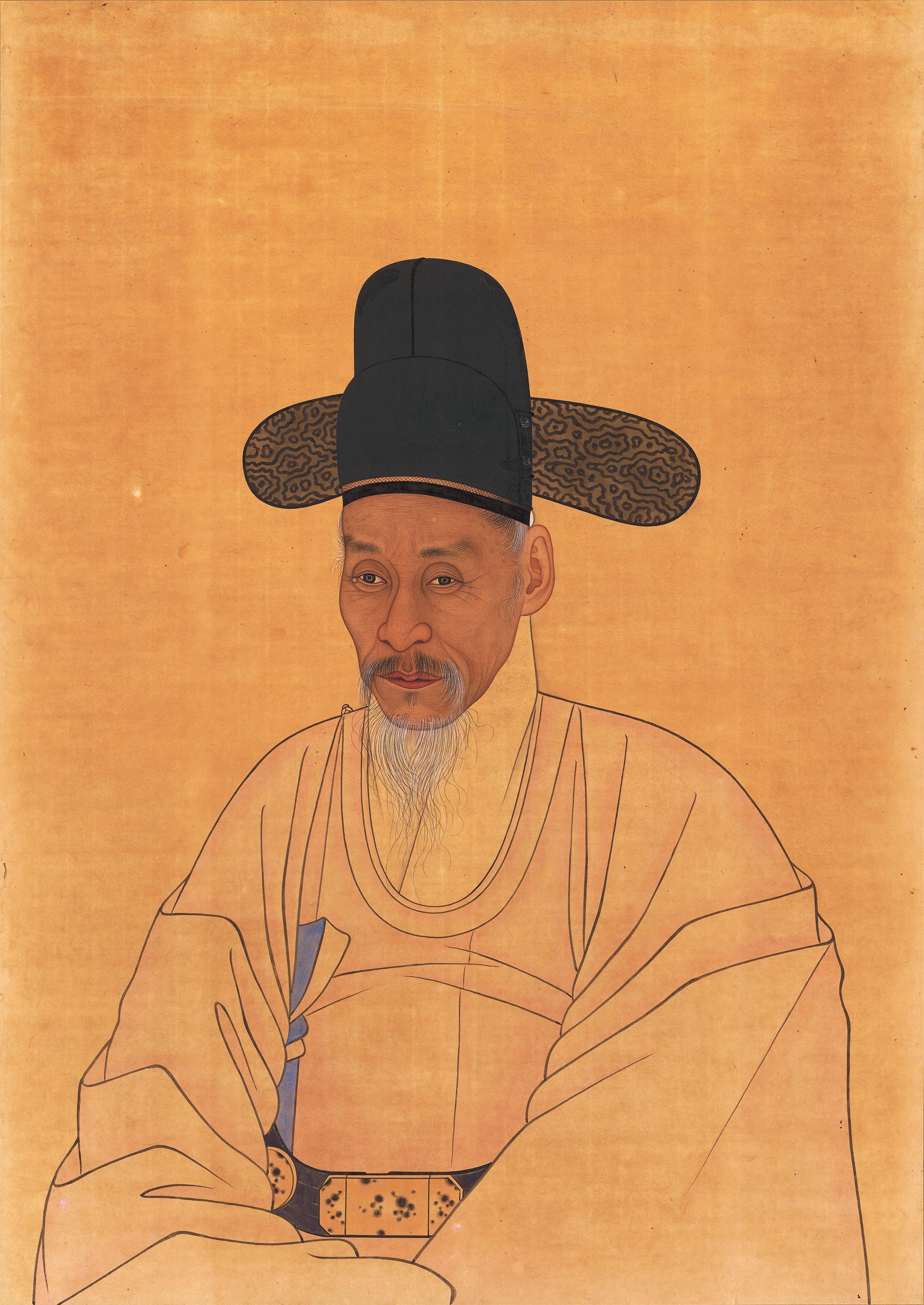

Chief State Councillor
- In office 24 July 1599 – 6 November 1599
- Preceded by: Yi Wŏnik
- Succeeded by: Yi Wŏnik

Left State Councillor
- In office 31 March 1598 – 9 April 1598
- Preceded by: Kim Ŭngnam
- Succeeded by: Yi Wŏnik
- In office 13 June 1592 – 11 December 1594
- Preceded by: Ch'oe Hŭngwŏn
- Succeeded by: Yu Hong

Right State Councillor
- In office 10 June 1592 – 10 June 1592
- Preceded by: Yi Yangwŏn
- Succeeded by: Yu Hong

Personal details
- Born: 1533 Hansŏng, Joseon
- Died: 1601 (aged 67–68) Joseon
- Political party: Westerners
- Spouse: Lady Hwang of the Changwon Hwang clan (m. 1553)
- Children: 5
- Parents: Yun Pyŏn (father); Lady Hyŏn of the Sŏngju Hyŏn clan (mother)
- Clan: Haepyeong Yun

Korean name
- Hangul: 윤두수
- Hanja: 尹斗壽
- RR: Yun Dusu
- MR: Yun Tusu

Art name
- Hangul: 오음
- Hanja: 梧陰
- RR: Oeum
- MR: Oŭm

Courtesy name
- Hangul: 자앙
- Hanja: 子仰
- RR: Jaang
- MR: Chaang

Posthumous name
- Hangul: 문정
- Hanja: 文靖
- RR: Munjeong
- MR: Munjŏng

Yun Tusu (Korean: 윤두수; Hanja: 尹斗壽; 1533–1601) was a Korean scholar-official of the Joseon period. A prominent politician, poet, writer, and scholar, he was part of the Yi Hwang school and a member of the Westerners. Yun briefly served as Chief State Councillor during the reign of King Seonjo.

== Early life ==
=== Birth and family ===
Yun Tusu was born on the 1st day, 9th month of 1533 in Pansongbang, (Note: (반송방; 盤松坊) Pansongbang was an area outside of Seodaemun and near the modern-day location of Independence Gate. It was where diplomatic convoys would depart for China.) Hansŏng, between Yun Pyŏn and Lady Hyŏn of the Sŏngju Hyŏn clan. His family was part of the Haepyeong Yun clan, whose members traditionally served as senior government officials during the Goryeo dynasty, but had decreased in prominence since the dawn of Joseon. For instance, the progenitor of the Haepyeong Yuns, Yun Kunjŏng (윤군정; 尹君正), had served as the Left Vice Director of Goryeo's Department of State Affairs (상서 좌복야; 尙書左僕射). In contrast, Yun's close ancestors did not progress their careers further beyond low-level offices.

Yun's father, Yun Pyŏn, served as a Kunjagamjŏng, a third-rank office under the Minister of Taxation which oversaw the storage and transfer of military supplies. Yun Pyŏn was a student of Cho Kwangjo. When Cho Kwangjo was imprisoned for his alleged conspiracy during the third literati purge of 1519, Yun Pyŏn pleaded on his behalf with a group of Confucian students from the Sungkyunkwan. Yun Pyŏn was consequently accused as a co-conspirator, but he avoided major repercussions and remained in the Sungkyunkwan. Yun Pyŏn died in 1549.

Yun Tusu married Lady Hwang of the Changwon Hwang clan (창원 황씨; 昌原黃氏) in 1553, with whom he had four sons: Yun Pang (윤방; 尹昉), Yun Hŭn (윤흔; 尹昕), Yun Hwi (윤휘; 尹暉), and Yun Hwŏn (윤훤; 尹暄), all of whom would later serve in high-ranking government office. Yun had one younger brother, Yun Kŭnsu, who would later serve as the Vice Minister of Public Works and the Headmaster of the Sungkyungkwan.

=== Education ===
During his younger years, Yun was taught by his father. After the death of his father, he studied under Yi Chungho (이중호; 李仲虎) and later Sŏng Such'im. After entering the public office, he became a student of Yi Hwang. Yun was taught Neo-Confucianist ideals from his mentors, but similarly to other scholars of his period, he was largely unversed in Neo-Confucianist philosophy. Instead, Yun devoted much of his literary studies to poetry.

== Career ==
=== Myeongjong era (1558–1567) ===
In 1555, Yun Tusu passed the Classics Licentiate Examination (Note: A minor examination (소과; 小科) which evaluated an examinee's understanding of the Four Books and Five Classics. Upon passing, the examinee would be granted permission to enroll in the Sungkyunkwan.) (생원시; 生員試) in first place. In 1558, he completed the regular triennial civil service examination (식년문과; 式年文科) and began his governmental career as an editorial examiner (검열; 檢閱) at the Office of Royal Decrees. Afterwards, he worked at the Office of Special Advisors as a proofreader (정자; 正字) and later as first copyist (저작; 著作). In 1561, he was appointed as an assistant section chief (좌랑; 佐郎) for the Ministry of Military Affairs; in 1562, he became an assistant section chief for the Ministry of Personnel.

During Yun's service in the Ministry of Personnel, Yi Ryang, a powerful politician and uncle of Queen Insun, recommended his son Yi Chŏngbin as an assistant section chief for the Ministry of Personnel. Yun, along with former section chief Pak Sorip and Yi Hubaek, opposed Yi Chŏngbin's appointment. Yi Ryang, whose supporters had established a political monopoly over the Three Offices, attempted to suppress the opposition. Likewise, Yun Tusu was impeached by the Office of the Inspector General in July 1563 and lost his position. However, just two days after Yun's impeachment, Myeongjong ordered the removal of Yi Ryang and Yi Chŏngbin from public office upon a petition that fiercely criticized Yi Ryang's meddling of public affairs. Yun was reinstated to the public office as sixth counselor (수찬) under the endorsement of then-Chief State Councilor Yun Wŏnhyŏng and Right State Councilor Sim T'ongwŏn.

Following his return to office, Yun was soon promoted as the section chief (정랑; 正郞) of the Ministry of Personnel. He then transferred to the State Council, where he served as legal secretary (검상; 檢詳) and then as drafting adviser (사인; 舍人). He later went back and forth between the Office of the Inspector General and Sungkyunkwan before settling in the Office the Royal Stables. In 1565, he supervised funeral rites at the mourning of Queen Munjeong during his tenure as assistant responding editor (부응교; 副應敎) of the Office of Special Advisors. After the rites were over, he was selected as the Grand Master of Comprehensive Governance (통정대부; 通政大夫) and was commissioned as the director of the Five Guards (오위장; 五衛將). On the 7th day, 1st month of 1566, he entered the Royal Secretariat as the sixth royal secretary (동부승지; 同副承旨) and was later promoted to the right assistant royal secretary (우부승지; 右副承旨). On the 8th month of 1566, he was appointed as the left assistant royal secretary (좌부승지; 左副承旨).

In 1567, while Yun was working as the Right Royal Secretary (우승지) at the Royal Secretariat, Myeongjong became bedridden in critical condition. Yun dispatched a letter to Chief State Councilor Yi Chun'gyŏng containing a historical anecdote, citing "Wen Yanbo of the Song Dynasty came into the palace and slept"—a message urging Yi to reside overnight at the King's residence. Yi Chun'gyŏng followed suit and soon after received Myeongjong's final order deciding on his successor (Note: Myeongjong's only linear male heir, Crown Prince Sunhoe, had died in 1563 at a young age. His chosen successor, Prince Haseong, was his nephew.) that very night.

=== Seonjo era (1567–1601) ===
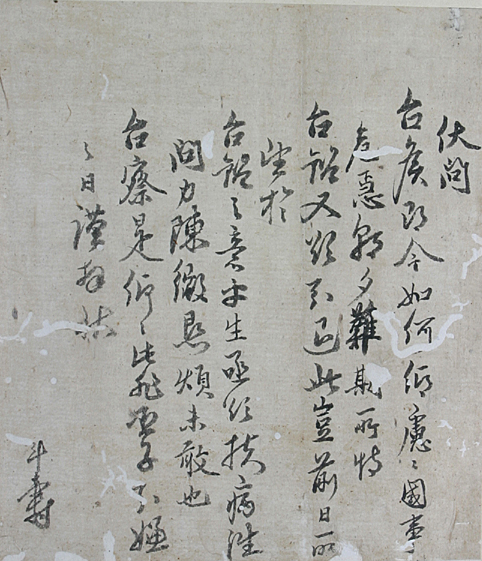
Letter of Yun Tusu

During the years following Seonjo's accession, the political environment surrounding the Joseon court shifted rapidly as Sarim literati filled up the ranks and the consort kin centered around Yi Ryang were ousted from the public sphere. A new generation of scholar-officials, with key figures including Yi Tak, and Chŏng Ch'ŏl, were appointed to principal government positions. Accordingly, Yun was selected to various senior positions, including the Chief Censor (대사간; 大司諫) of the Office of Censors and the third minister of personnel (이조참의). From September 1574, he was put in charge of supervising the civil service examinations, becoming an assistant examiner (대독관; 對讀官) the following month.

The policies of the early Seonjo era gave rise to a youthful generation of Sarim politicians, who demanded the redressing of past literati purges and the establishment of a system of appointment where junior officials are authorized to nominate meritorious scholars (seonbi) to office (낭천제; 郎薦制). They conflicted with elderly officeholders (구신; 舊臣), who opposed radical reform and insisted that appointment powers are reserved to top-level ministers. Yun Tusu, along with political cohorts Pak Sun, Yi Tak, and Kim Kyehwi, aligned with the Sarim—although he had been in public service since the era of Myeongjong and was considered a senior politician by then. For instance, in 1570, Yun requested the forfeiture of the titles of merit (공신; 功臣) that were awarded to those who orchestrated the literati purge of 1545. By the 1570s, however, Sarim officeholders dominated the political sphere as elderly conservatives died or retired from office.

In 1575, the Sarim faction split into two factions—the Easterners and the Westerners. While the division was caused by a dispute between Sim Ŭigyŏm and Kim Hyowŏn over the appointment of Kim Hyowŏn as the section chief for the Ministry of Personnel, it encompassed a larger, structural dissenssion between older and younger Sarim politicians. Yun Tusu joined the Westerners, who were supporters of Sim Ŭigyŏm and consisted of senior members of the former Sarim.

Yun quickly rose as a leading figure among the Westerners as a member of the "Three Yuns"—Yun Tusu, Yun Kŭnsu, and Yun's nephew, Yun Hyŏn—all of whom held prominent offices in government. In 1576, Yun Hyŏn was appointed as assistant section chief in the Ministry of Personnel. Yun Hyŏn's appointment sparked conflict between incumbent section chief Kim Sŏngil, an Easterner, and Yun Hyŏn's two uncles, who actively suppressed the Easterners. In 1578, a dispute erupted between the two factions when Kim Sŏngil accused the three Yuns of accepting bribes from Magistrate of Jindo County Yi Su (이수; 李銖), which led to the impeachment of the three Yuns by the Office of the Inspector-General and the Office of Censors. While all three men were eventually reinstated to a government office, the incident marked the first major contention between the two factions.

Following the impeachment incident, Yun Tusu grew skeptical of returning to a central government post and took the position of the magistrate of Naju (나주목사; 羅州牧使). He was later promoted as the magistrate of the Yeonan Protectorate (연한도호부사; 延安都護府使), and was granted silk clothes from Seonjo in 1581 for his contributions during a famine. After serving as a magistrate, Yun returned to Hansŏng as the city's second magistrate (한성부좌윤; 漢城府左尹), and then became the vice minister of Punishment (형조참판; 刑曹參判). In 1587, Yun was appointed as the governor of Jeolla Province following an invasion of Japanese pirates in the region, where he directed efforts to discipline local magistrates and punish outlaws.

In 1588, Yun Tusu became the second deputy director of the Privy Council (동지중추부사) in June and then the governor of Pyeongan Province (평안도관찰사) and magistrate of Pyongyang Magistracy (평안부윤) in autumn. When there was news that the leader of the barbarians was coming to the western border, Yun Tusu strategically responded by reducing the number of soldiers belonging to the military and increasing the number of troops from four to six because they ran away increased day by day. The following year, he taught the people around Yalu River how to plant cotton in Pyongyang. In 1590, he was established as Gwanggukgongsin and sealed to Haewongun due to the contribution of correcting the Joseon dynasty's genealogy. In August of that year, he resigned his original position and went up to the Minister of Punishments (형조판서) and became the Inspector General. A month later, he became a Fourth Superintendent of Privy Council (지중추부사). He became the Inspector General again in 1591.

In March 1591, he became the Minister of Taxation, but in June, He had decided to support Prince Shinseong with Yi Sanhae, but he supported Gwanghaegun in the Geonjeo issue, a partisan fight between the Easterners and the Westerners, so King Seonjo was angry and divested Yun Tusu of his office and exiled him with his younger brother Yun Kŭnsu to Hoeryong. After that, He was transferred to Hongwon due to the continued impeachment of the Easterners.

==== Japanese invasions of Korea (1592–1598) ====
In March 1591, a letter sent by Toyotomi Hideyoshi through Joseon Tongsinsa said he would invade Ming dynasty, but unlike other subjects who insisted on hiding it from the Ming dynasty, he actively insisted on telling the Ming Dynasty the situation of Japan. In October 1591, when he was exiled to Hongwon, diplomatic envoys to Ming (진주사) returned from Beijing. When they reported that the Wanli Emperor praised the situation of Japan in detail, the royal court tried to let him go of his exile for his contribution, but he was transferred to Haeju due to opposition from the Office of Censors and the Office of the Inspector General. On April 13, 1592, when Japan captured Dongnae following Busan, he was released on 23 April as king's special order.

On April 28, it was reported that Sin Rip had been defeated in Chungju, so King Seonjo proposed royal flight from the palace and it was decided the next day. Yun Tusu joined King Seonjo's departure to the west at the dawn of April 30 as an official holding sinecure post. Arriving in Kaesong on May 1, the procession of the royal carriage took Yun Tusu as the captain of Office of the Directorate General (어영대장) on May 2 and sacrificed to Right State Councilor the next day. Yun Tusu insisted on sending an address to Liaodong to announce the war, punishing those who did not come with king as court officials, and remaining in Kaesong and defending. However, when King Seonjo heard that Kyongsong had fallen, he wanted to leave Kaesong. Yun Tusu requested that the royal carriage leaves early in the morning, but it was not accepted. Accordingly, Yun Tusu sent the governor of Hwanghae to soothe people so that the procession could leave Kaesong safely.

The royal carriage left Kaesong on May 3 and arrived in Pyongyang on May 7. On May 9, he became Left State Councilor. On May 19, discussions took place on asking Ming for relief forces. Yun Tusu objected to this for three reasons. First, Joseon's soldiers are guarding Imjin River and have enough troops. Second, it is not clear that the Ming government will send troops. Third, the military in Liaodong and Guangning have a ferocious nature and various villages in Pyongan Province will be devastated. However, as the situation became increasingly urgent, Yun Tusu also agreed to the request for relief forces. He also insisted on protecting Pyongyang in discussions on whether to protect Pyongyang or move to another place. King Seonjo refused to accept this and asked to discuss the next destination, and Yun Tusu recommended going to Uiju rather than Hamhung. The procession left for Uiju, and Yun Tusu remained with Yi Wŏnik to protect Pyongyang.

== Family ==
1. Parents and Siblings
  1. Father: Yun Byeon (윤변; 尹忭; 1493 – 8 July 1549)
  2. Step-mother - Lady Yi of the Jeonju Yi clan (전주 이씨)
    1. Older step-brother - Yun Dam-su (윤담수; 尹聃壽)
    2. Older step-brother - Yun Chun-su (윤춘수; 尹春壽; 1521 – ?)
    3. Older step-brother - Yun Gi-su (윤기수; 尹期壽)
  3. Mother: Lady Hyeon of the Palgeo Hyeon clan (팔거 현씨; 八莒 玄氏; ? – 1544)
    1. Older step-sister - Lady Yun of the Haepyeong Yun clan (해평 윤씨)
    2. Younger brother - Yun Kŭnsu (윤근수; 尹根壽; 1537 – 17 August 1616)
2. Wives and their children
  1. Lady Hwang of the Changwon Hwang clan (창원 황씨; 昌原 黃氏; ? – 1591)
    1. Son - Yun Bang (윤방; 尹昉; 22 June 1563 – August 1640)
    2. Son - Yun Heun (윤흔; 尹昕; 1564 – 17 December 1638)
    3. Son - Yun Hwi (윤휘; 尹暉; 1571–1644)
    4. Son - Yun Hwon (윤훤; 尹暄)
  2. Unnamed concubine
    1. Son - Yun Gan (윤간; 尹旰; 1573 – 12 February 1665)

== Bibliography ==
- Oheum-yugo 《오음유고》 (梧陰遺稿)
- Gija-ji 《기자지》 (箕子誌)
- Seongin-rok 《성인록 成仁錄》
- Pyeongyang-ji 《평양지 平壤志》
- Yeonan-ji 《연안지 延安志》

== Popular culture ==
- Portrayed by Jung Dong-hwan in the 2004–2005 KBS1 TV series Immortal Admiral Yi Sun-sin.
