= Yi Sanhae =

Korean politician (1539–1609)

Yi Sanhae 이산해
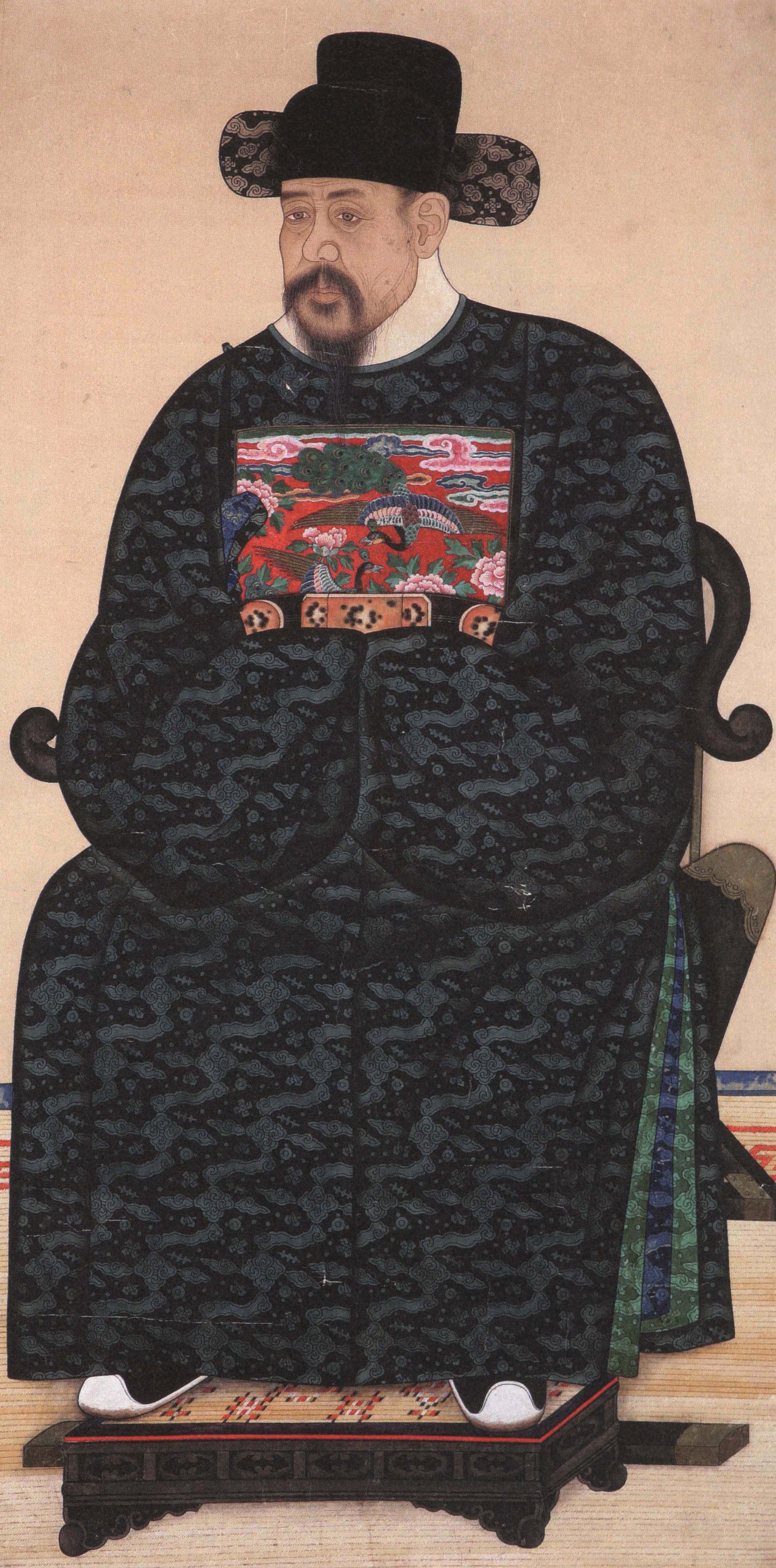

Chief State Councillor
- In office 6 March 1600 – 9 June 1600
- Preceded by: Yi Wŏnik
- Succeeded by: Yi Hangbok
- In office 1590 – 10 June 1592
- Preceded by: Yu Chŏn
- Succeeded by: Yi Yangwŏn

Left State Councillor
- In office 16 March 1589 – 11 March 1590
- Preceded by: Yu Chŏn
- Succeeded by: Chŏng Ch'ŏl

Right State Councillor
- In office 19 November 1588 – 16 March 1589
- Preceded by: Yu Chŏn
- Succeeded by: Chŏng Ŏnsin

Personal details
- Born: July 20, 1539 Hansŏng, Joseon
- Died: August 2, 1609 (aged 70)
- Party: Easterners, later Northerners
- Spouse: Lady Cho of the Yangju Cho clan
- Children: Yi Kyŏngbaek; Yi Kyŏngjŏn; Yi Kyŏngsin; Yi Kyŏngyu; 4 daughters
- Parents: Yi Chibŏn (father); Lady Nam of the Uiryeong Nam clan (mother)
- Occupation: Writer; Poet; Civil servant

Korean name
- Hangul: 이산해
- Hanja: 李山海
- RR: I Sanhae
- MR: I Sanhae

Art name
- Hangul: 아계, 종남수옹, 죽피옹, 시촌거사
- Hanja: 鵝溪, 終南睡翁, 竹皮翁, 枾村居士
- RR: Agye, Jongnamsuong, Jukpiong, Sichongeosa
- MR: Agye, Chongnamsuong, Chukp'iong, Sich'on'gŏsa

Courtesy name
- Hangul: 여수
- Hanja: 汝受
- RR: Yeosu
- MR: Yŏsu

Posthumous name
- Hangul: 문충
- Hanja: 文忠
- RR: Munchung
- MR: Munch'ung

Yi Sanhae (Korean: 이산해; Hanja: 李山海; 20 July 1539 – 1609) was a Korean politician, scholar, writer and poet of the Joseon period who came from the Hansan Yi clan. He served as the Chief State Councilor of Joseon from 1590 to 1592 and 1600. Yi was a member of the political faction the Easterners and when this split into the Northerners and Southerners, Yi became leader of the Northerners faction.

== Early life ==
Yi was born in Hansŏng to a yangban family and his 5th great-grandfather was Yi Saek, a scholar and writer that lived during late Goryeo. He studied under his uncle Yi Ji-ham and was praised for his intelligence. At age 5 he is said to have written poems and by age 15 he had passed the Hyangsi Examination multiple times and was famous for his calligraphy and painting skills. He also studied under Cho Sik and Yi Hwang and would later go on to form the Eastern and Northern factions with his classmates.

He passed the Mungwa in 1561 and was initially appointed to the Office of Diplomatic Correspondence (승문원; 承文院; Sŭngmunwŏn).

== Career ==
In 1562, he was recommended to the Hongmun'gwan. He would then go on to hold various ranks until becoming chikchehak in 1567. In 1570, he became one of the six royal secretaries, part of the Sueunjungwon. He resigned from his post in 1574 after his father's death but returned 3 years later and was appointed to Taesagan.

In 1578, he was put in charge of a corruption investigation involving Yun Tusu and Yun Kŭnsu, leaders of the Westerners faction. Yi, who was part of the Easterners, viciously attacked the brothers and had them removed from their positions. Later that year when he was appointed Taejehak and Tosŭngji, the Westerners, holding a grudge for his previous actions, opposed this. However, the king Seonjo trusted in Yi's talents and ignored the complaints.

In 1579, he was promoted to Minister of Law. In 1583, he went through the posts of Chief of the Ŭigŭmbu, Minister of Personnel, Rites and Military Affairs in a single year. Attacks against Yi from the Westerners intensified in 1585 and Kim Uong (김우옹; 金宇顒) and Yi Sanbo reported this to Seonjo. The king assured the two, saying his trust in Yi would not be shaken by false rumours. In 1585, Yi tried to resign from his post after the mass death of the horses meant to be sent as tribute but the King refused to accept his resignation. He attempted to resign again in 1586 after being attacked by the Westerner Cho Hŏn, but Seonjo once again persuaded him to stay.

In 1588, Yi was appointed as the Right State Councilor (Uŭijŏng) despite resistance from the Westerners and he was promoted to the Left State Councilor (Chwaŭijŏng) a year later in 1589.

Also in 1589, Chŏng Yŏrip, a former Westerner who had switched factions to the more dominant Easterners, was accused of treason. Seonjo made the Westerner Chŏng Ch'ŏl the Right State Councilor and put him in charge of the investigation. The Westerners took this opportunity to launch a purge and killed many prominent Easterners including, Chŏng Ŏnsin, Chŏng Kaech'ŏng, Yi Pal and more. There were attempts to implicate Yi in the rebellion as well but failed due to Seonjo's deep trust in him. When Chŏng Amsu and 50 others requested that Yi Sanhae and Yu Sŏngnyong be punished for connections to Chŏng Yŏrip, Seonjo became angered and instead ordered for the punishment of those who had made the request. He then personally met Yi and Yu and reassured them.

In 1590, he promoted to the Chief State Councilor (Yŏngŭijŏng), the highest position in court.

When it became time to appoint an heir to the king, Yi decided to take the opportunity to regain dominance for the Easterners and take revenge for the purge of 1589. The consensus in court was that Prince Gwanghae would be best suited to become the crown prince, but Yi knew that Seonjo preferred Prince Sinseong. In 1591, when Chŏng Ch'ŏl, Yu Sŏngnyong, Yi Haesu, Yi Sŏngjung and others came to Yi discuss the matter of succession, he pretended to agree with the others and agreed to recommend Prince Gwanghae be made crown prince to the King. Yi Sanhae was very close with the Kim Kongnyang, brother of Lady In, Prince Sinseong's mother and Concubine of Seonjo and informed him that Chŏng Ch'ŏl and the Westerners were trying harm the Lady and Prince Sinseong. Kim then informed his sister who went to the King weeping with the news. Then Yi led all of the ministers to Seonjo and asked him to name a successor. When the King asked the ministers who should become the crown prince, Chŏng Ch'ŏl and the Westerners recommended Prince Gwanghae while the Easterners Yi Sanhae and Yu Sŏngnyong remained silent. This greatly angered Seonjo, who immediately dismissed Chŏng Ch'ŏl and the others who had agreed with him from their positions.

A fracture emerged within the Easterners faction on how to deal with Chŏng Ch'ŏl. The Northerners such as Chŏng Inhong who were mostly students of Cho Sik who were the more aggressive wing of the Easterners had suffered greatly in Chŏng Yŏrip's Purge pushed for Chŏng's execution and stronger persecution against the Westerners. Meanwhile, the more conservative Easterners led by Yu Sŏngnyong were mostly students of Yi Hwang and suffered less during the purge so just wanted to settle for exile. Yi Sanhae was part of the Northerners and fearing that one day Chŏng Ch'ŏl would seek revenge, argued strongly for his execution.

The Northerners won the struggle and became the dominant faction just before the outbreak of the Imjin War in 1592. After the fall of the Westerners, Yi had them all dismissed from court and replaced them by recalling the Easterners who had been removed during the purge.

== Imjin War ==
Yi Sanhae was the Chief State Councilor when the Japanese invaded in 1592, beginning the Imjin War. After the defeats at Sangju and Tangeumdae, Seonjo expressed his wish to abandon the capital of Hansŏng. This was opposed by all the government ministers except for Yi, who argued that there was a precedent in history for similar events. Blamed for the initial military setbacks and the loss of the capital, Yi was exiled to Kangwon Province until 1595. He was released in 1595 and returned to court despite opposition from the Westerners. During the war, to oppose Yu Sŏngnyong who supported Yi Sun-sin, Yi Sanhae was more sympathetic towards Wŏn Kyun. After his return he became Taejehak and acted as the leader of the Northerners although by this time they had divided into the greater Northerner and Smaller Northerners. Yi Sanhae was part of the Greater Northerners but largely stayed out of inter-factional squabbles.

In 1596, he was put in charge of investigating a peasant rebellion led by Yi Monghak.

After the death of Toyotomi Hideyoshi, the Japanese began withdrawing from Korea in 1598. Yi Sanhae's son Yi Kyŏngjŏn had also passed the kwagŏ examination and had been recommended for the post of section chief of the Ministry of Personnel (이조정랑; 吏曹正郎; ijo chŏngnang), however the previous section chief Chŏng Kyŏngse (정경세; 鄭經世), a Southerner, opposed the appointment based on Yi's personality. This greatly angered Yi Sanhae and his followers and deepened his distrust in the Southerners.

== Later life and death ==
In 1601, he received the noble title of Aseong Buwongun, and served in various roles until 1609. Late into Seonjo's reign, when the Northerners split over the succession, with the Greater Northerners supporting Prince Gwanghae for the throne and the Smaller Northerners supporting Prince Yeongchang, Yi supported Prince Gwanghae although he knew the king preferred Prince Yeongchang as he thought the latter was too young (3 years old). After Seonjo's death in 1608, Yi prevented a plot by the Smaller Northerners and ensured Prince Gwanghae succeeded to the throne. He retired in 1609 and died later that year.

== Family ==
Though Yi's great-great-grandfather, Yi U (이우)'s cousin, Yi Kae become Yi San-hae's third cousin.

- Father
  - Yi Chibŏn (이지번, 李之蕃; 1508 – 1 December/21 April 1575)
- Mother:
  - Lady Nam of the Uiryeong Nam clan (의령 남씨; 夫人 宜寧 南氏; 1509 – June 24, 1581)
- Siblings
  - Older sister: Lady Yi (이씨; 夫人 李氏)
  - Older sister: Lady Yi (이씨; 夫人 李氏)
  - Younger half-brother: Yi San'gwang (이산광; 李山光; 1550 – 5 January 1624)
- Wife and children
  - Lady Cho of the Yangju Cho clan (양주 조씨; 夫人 陽州 趙氏; 24 November 1542 – 19 April 1604); daughter of Cho Ŏnsu (조언수; 趙彦秀)
    - Son: Yi Kyŏngbaek (이경백, 李慶伯; 1561–August 1580)
    - Daughter: Lady Yi (이씨; 夫人 李氏)
    - Son: Yi Kyŏngjŏn (이경전, 李慶全; 1567–1644)
    - Daughter: Lady Yi (증 정경부인 이씨, 贈 貞敬夫人 李氏; d. 1592)
    - Daughter: Lady Yi (이씨; 夫人 李氏)
    - Daughter: Lady Yi (이씨; 夫人 李氏)
    - Son: Yi Kyŏngsin (이경신; 李慶伸)
    - Son: Yi Kyŏngyu (이경유; 李慶愈) died prematurely

== Book ==
- 《Agye chip》(아계집; 鵝溪集)
- 《Agye yugo》(아계유고; 鵝溪遺稿)

== Popular culture ==
- Portrayed by Ahn Suk-hwan in the 2014 KBS2 TV series The King's Face.
- Portrayed by Lee Jae-yong in the 2015 KBS1 TV series The Jingbirok: A Memoir of Imjin War.

== See also ==
- Korean literature
- Joseon Dynasty
- Chŏng Ch'ŏl
