= Inhyeon-dong =

Neighborhood in Seoul, South Korea

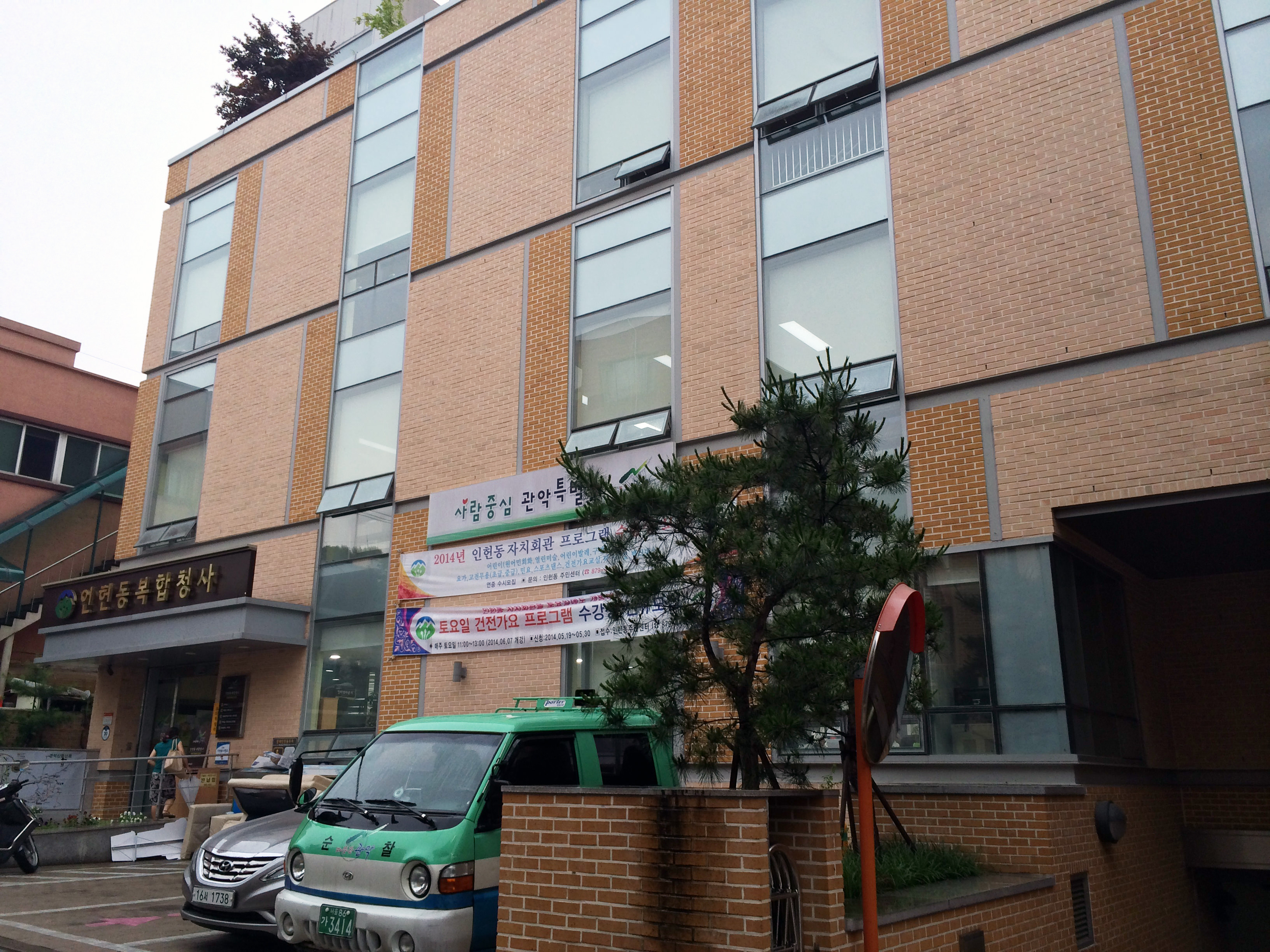
- Inheon-dong Community Service Center
- Interactive map of Inhyeon-dong
- Country: South Korea

Area
  - Total: 0.11 km^{2} (0.042 sq mi)

Korean name
- Hangul: 인현동
- Hanja: 仁峴洞
- RR: Inhyeon-dong
- MR: Inhyŏn-dong

Inhyeon-dong (Korean: 인현동) is a legal dong (neighborhood) of Jung District, Seoul, South Korea. It is governed by its administrative dongs, Gwanghui-dong and Euljiro 3, 4, 5ga-dong.

== See also ==
- Administrative divisions of South Korea
