= Southerners (Korean political faction) =

16th-18th century Joseon faction

Southerners 南人
- Split from: Easterners
- Preceded by: Easterners

- Southerners
- Hangul: 남인
- Hanja: 南人
- RR: Namin
- MR: Namin

The Southerners (Korean: 남인; Hanja: 南人) were a political faction of the Joseon Dynasty. The faction was created after the split of the Easterners in 1591 by Yi Sanhae's opponents. Its leader was Yu Sŏngnyong, who died in 1607. Leader Hŏ Mok was Left Prime Minister from 1675 to 1678. Leader Yun Hyu was executed in 1680. They supported Jang Huibin, queen consort of Sukjong of Joseon from 1688 to 1694. The faction continued to exist until the 18th century.

See also, Noron, and for the role of private Confucian academies (together with their shrines), in strife between the factions, see seowon.

== Members ==
- Yu Sŏngnyong
- Yun Sŏndo
- Yun Hyu
- Hŏ Mok
- Hŏ Chŏk
- Jang Huibin
- Chŏng Yagyong
