= Ch'oe Yŏnggyŏng =

Joseon scholar-official (1529–1590)

- Hangul: 최영경
- Hanja: 崔永慶
- RR: Choe Yeonggyeong
- MR: Ch'oe Yŏnggyŏng

Art name
- Hangul: 수우당
- Hanja: 守愚堂
- RR: Suudang
- MR: Suudang

Courtesy name
- Hangul: 효원
- Hanja: 孝元
- RR: Hyowon
- MR: Hyowŏn

Ch'oe Yŏnggyŏng (Korean: 최영경; Hanja: 崔永慶, 1529–1590) was a scholar-official of the Joseon period of Korea. His art name was Suudang (수우당). His courtesy name was Hyowŏn (효원). He was a Westerner, and was killed as a result of the 1589 Kich'uk Oksa. In 1611 (3rd year of Gwanghae-gun), he was honored at Deokcheonseowon in Sancheong.
