= Yun Kŭnsu =

Joseon writer (1537–1616)

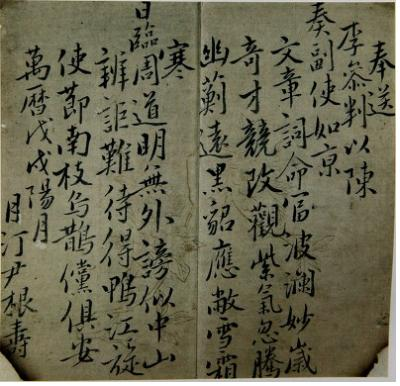
Letter of Yun Kŭnsu

Yun Kŭnsu (Korean: 윤근수; Hanja: 尹根壽, 1537–1616) was a Korean scholar-official of the Joseon period. His art names were Wŏlchŏng (월정; 月汀), Oeam (외암; 畏菴), and his courtesy name was Chago (자고; 子固).

Yun held the position of Minister of Rites during the Imjin War.

== Family ==
- Father
  - Yun Pyŏn (윤변; 尹忭; 1493 – 8 July 1549)
- Mother
  - Lady Hyŏn of the Palgeo Hyŏn clan (팔거 현씨; 八莒 玄氏; ? – 1544); Yun Pyŏn's second wife
    - Grandfather - Hyŏn Yunmyŏng (현윤명; 玄允明)
- Siblings
  - Older half-brother - Yun Tamsu (윤담수; 尹聃壽)
  - Older half-brother - Yun Ch'unsu (윤춘수; 尹春壽; 1521 – ?)
  - Older half-brother - Yun Kisu (윤기수; 尹期壽)
  - Older half-sister - Lady Yun of the Haepyeong Yun clan (해평 윤씨)
  - Older brother - Yun Tusu (윤두수; 尹斗壽; 1533–1601)
- Wife and children
  - Lady Cho of the Pungyang Cho clan (풍양 조씨; 豐壤 趙氏)
    - Son - Yun Hwan (윤환; 尹晥; 1556 – ?)
    - Son - Yun Chil (윤질; 尹晊)
    - Son - Yun Myŏng (윤명, 尹㫥)
    - Son - Yun Yu (윤유; 尹曘)
    - Son - Yun Hwan (윤환, 尹㬇)
    - Son - Yun Min (윤민; 尹旼)

== Popular culture ==
- Portrayed by Lee Won-bal in the 2004–2005 KBS1 TV series Immortal Admiral Yi Sun-sin.
