= Kim Hyowŏn =

Joseon scholar-official (1542–1590)

- Hangul: 김효원
- Hanja: 金孝元
- RR: Gim Hyowon
- MR: Kim Hyowŏn

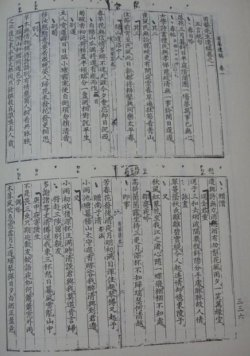
Workbook of Kim Hyowŏn

Kim Hyowŏn (Korean: 김효원; Hanja: 金孝元; 1542 – 1 April 1590) was a Korean philosopher and politician during the Joseon period. A Neo-Confucian scholar, his art name was Sŏngam (성암; 省庵), and his courtesy name was Inbaek (인백; 仁伯). He was a leader of the Easterners faction, born into the Seonsan Kim clan (선산 김씨; 善山 金氏).

== Family ==
- Father
  - Kim Hongu (김홍우; 金弘遇; 1518–1578)
- Mother
  - Lady Yun of the Haepyeong Yun clan (해평 윤씨; 海平 尹氏; 1522–?)
- Siblings
  - Younger sister: Lady Kim of the Seonsan Kim clan (선산 김씨; 善山 金氏; 1547–?)
  - Younger brother: Kim Iwŏn (김이원; 金履元; 1553–1614)
  - Younger sister: Lady Kim of the Seonsan Kim clan (선산 김씨; 善山 金氏; 1555–?)
  - Younger brother: Kim Sinwŏn (김신원; 金信元; 1555–?)
  - Younger brother: Kim Ŭiwŏn (김의원; 金義元; 1558–1602)

Consort(s) and issue

- Lady Jeong of the Chogye Jeong clan (초계 정씨; 1542–?)
  - Son: Kim Kŭkkŏn (김극건; 金克健; 1569–1624)
  - Son: Kim Kŭngnyŏn (김극련; 金克鍊; 1572–?)
  - Daughter: Lady Kim of the Seonsan Kim clan (선산 김씨; 善山 金氏; 1575–?)
  - Son: Kim Kŭkkam (김극감; 金克鑑; 1577–?)
  - Son: Kim Kŭksŏn (김극선; 金克銑; 1584–1664)

== Works ==
- Sŏngam chip (성암집; 省庵集)

== See also ==
- Sim Ŭigyŏm
- Yi Hwang
- Cho Sik
