= Yu Sŏngnyong =

Chief State Councilor of Joseon

Yu Sŏngnyong 유성룡; 류성룡

Chief State Councillor
- In office 4 December 1592 – 6 November 1598
- Preceded by: Ch'oe Hŭngwŏn
- Succeeded by: Yi Wŏnik
- In office 10 June 1592 – 9 July 1592
- Preceded by: Yi Yangwŏn
- Succeeded by: Ch'oe Hŭngwŏn

Left State Councillor
- In office 24 February 1591 – 10 June 1592
- Preceded by: Chŏng Ch'ŏl
- Succeeded by: Yi Yangwŏn

Right State Councillor
- In office 4 April 1590 – 24 February 1591
- Preceded by: Sim Sugyŏng
- Succeeded by: Yi Yangwŏn

Personal details
- Born: 7 November 1542 Gyeongsang Province, Joseon
- Died: 31 May 1607 (aged 64) Andong, Joseon
- Occupation: Scholar-official

Korean name
- Hangul: 유성룡; 류성룡 (Note: The hanja character 柳 can be read as both Yu (유) or Ryu (류).)
- Hanja: 柳成龍
- RR: Yu Seongryong; Ryu Seongryong
- MR: Yu Sŏngnyong; Ryu Sŏngnyong

Art name
- Hangul: 서애
- Hanja: 西厓
- RR: Seoae
- MR: Sŏae

Courtesy name
- Hangul: 이현
- Hanja: 而見
- RR: Ihyeon
- MR: Ihyŏn

Posthumous name
- Hangul: 문충
- Hanja: 文忠
- RR: Munchung
- MR: Munch'ung

Yu Sŏngnyong (Korean: 유성룡; Hanja: 柳成龍; 7 November 1542 – May 1607), also known as Ryu Sŏngnyong (Korean: 류성룡), was a scholar-official of the Joseon period of Korea. He held many responsibilities, including the Chief State Councillor position in 1592. He was a member of the "Eastern faction" and a follower of Yi Hwang.

== Early life and education ==
Yu was born in Hahoe Maeul, Andong, Gyeongsang Province (today a UNESCO World Heritage Site), to a yangban family of the P'ungsan Yu clan.

Yu is said to have been so precocious that he absorbed the teachings of Confucius and Mencius at the age of 8. In 1564 the 19th year of Myeongjong, he passed the Samasi examination, and in 1566 he passed the Mun-gwa at a special examination, and then took the post of kwŏnji bujŏngja (권지부정사; 權知副正字). He held various other positions and in 1569 he joined the imperial birthday mission to Ming as a Seojanggwan (서장관, 書狀官, the third of the mission), returning to Korea the following year.

== Career ==
Thereafter he held posts including Inspector of Classics (경연검토관; 經筵檢討官) and devoted himself to editing, being granted a royal sabbatical (사가독서; 賜暇讀書). Subsequently, he held posts including kyori (교리, ranked 5a) and ŭnggyo (응교, 應敎, ranked 4a). He was appointed chik chehak (직제학; 直提學) in 1575 and pujehak (부제학; 副提學) in 1576. Continually he held posts including tosŏngji (都承旨), taesahŏn (대사헌; 大司憲) and taejehak (대제학; 大提學).

In 1590, he was appointed Uŭijŏng (Third State Councillor), honored with the third rank of Kwanguk Kongsin (광국공신; 光國功臣), and appointed as Pungwŏn Buwŏngun (풍원부원군; 豊原府院君). In 1591, he was promoted to Chwaŭijŏng (Second State Councillor) and ijo p'ansŏ (이조판서, Minister of Personnel, the first ranked of the six Ministries). However, the Easterners faction split into the Southerners and the Northerners. Yu Sŏngnyong was a Southerner (claiming exile, instead of death, for Chŏng Ch'ŏl, the leader of the Westerners rival faction).

He was in the rank of provincial to ch'ech'alsa (도체찰사; 都體察使) when the Imjin War broke out. In 1592 he was appointed Yŏngŭijŏng, the Chief State Councillor. Yu Sŏngnyong accompanied the royal family from Hanseong to Uiju. In this capacity, he oversaw all military units and called leaders like Yi Sun-sin and Kwŏn Yul to battle. He also fought on the Korean-Chinese allied forces side in the Siege of Pyongyang. He suggested of establishment the Hunnyeon Dogam (훈련도감, 訓鍊都監, Military Training Agency).

In 1598, he was ousted by the Northerners faction. But King Seonjo rehabilitated him. However, he refused to take office as a minister in 1600. Nevertheless, in 1602, he was honored with the second rank of Hosŏng Kongsin (호성공신; 扈聖功臣), and appointed again as Pungwŏn Buwŏngun.

== Family ==
Parents

- Father: Yu Chung-yŏng (유중영; 1515 – 1573)
- Mother: Lady Kim of the Andong Kim clan

Consorts and their issue(s):

- Wife: Lady Yi of the Jeonju Yi clan
  - Yu Wi (유위), 1st son
  - Yu Yŏ (유여), 2nd son
  - Yu Tan (유단), 3rd son
  - Yu Chin (유진), 4th son
- Wife: Lady Chang of the Indong Chang clan
  - Yu Ch'o (유초), 5th son
  - Yu Ch'ŏm (유첨), 6th son

== Later life and death ==
After which he spent his time on political writing until his death in 1607.

== Legacy ==
Yu's major writings are preserved in the Sŏae chip (The Anthology of Seoae, 서애집, 西厓集), Jingbirok (The Book of Corrections), and minor writings as Hwanghwa chip (황화집; 皇華集), Chŏngch'ungrok (정충록; 精忠錄). Yu Sŏngnyong was enshrined in the Byeongsan Seowon and Hogye Seowon in Andong, North Gyeongsang Province.

== Popular culture ==
- Portrayed by Lee Jae-ryong in the 2004–2005 KBS1 TV series Immortal Admiral Yi Sun-sin.
- Portrayed by Kim Sang-joong in the 2015 KBS1 TV series The Jingbirok: A Memoir of Imjin War.

== See also ==
- Political factions in Joseon dynasty
- Hideyoshi's invasions of Korea
