= Chŏng Inhong =

Korean scholar-official (1535–1623)

Chŏng Inhong 정인홍

Chief State Councillor
- In office February 12, 1618 – April 26, 1619
- Preceded by: Ki Chahŏn
- Succeeded by: Pak Sŭngjong

Left State Councillor
- In office February 27, 1614 – January 25, 1618
- Preceded by: Yi Hangbok
- Succeeded by: Chŏng Ch'angyŏn

Right State Councillor
- In office September 29, 1612 – February 27, 1614 (suspended from office: June 13 – November 6, 1613)
- Preceded by: Yi Hangbok
- Succeeded by: Chŏng Ch'angyŏn

Personal details
- Born: March 8, 1363 Hapcheon County, South Gyeongsang Province, Joseon
- Died: February 28, 1452 (aged 88)

Korean name
- Hangul: 정인홍
- Hanja: 鄭仁弘
- RR: Jeong Inhong
- MR: Chŏng Inhong

Art name
- Hangul: 내암
- Hanja: 來庵
- RR: Naeam
- MR: Naeam

Courtesy name
- Hangul: 덕원
- Hanja: 德遠
- RR: Deokwon
- MR: Tŏgwŏn

Chŏng Inhong (Korean: 정인홍; Hanja: 鄭仁弘; September 26, 1535 – April 3, 1623) was a scholar-official of the Joseon period of Korea. A general and a leader of the Northerners faction. He served as Chief State Councillor during the reign of Gwanghaegun. His art name was Naeam (내암; 來庵). He belonged to the Seosan Chŏng clan.

== Family ==
- Father
  - Chŏng Ryun (정륜; 鄭倫)
- Mother
  - Lady Kang of the Jinju Kang clan (진주 강씨; ?–1582)
- Siblings
  - Unnamed younger brother
  - Younger brother – Chŏng Inyŏng (정인영; 鄭仁榮; 1540–1602)
- Wife and children
  - Lady Yang of the Namwon Yang clan (남원 양씨); daughter of Yang Hŭi (양희; 梁喜)
    - Son – Chŏng Yŏn (정연; 鄭沇; 1571–1592)
      - Daughter-in-law – Lady Ha of the Jinju Ha clan (진주 하씨); daughter of Ha Chinbo (하진보; 河晋寶)
        - Grandson – Chŏng Nŭng (정능, 鄭木+菱)

== Works ==
- Naeam chip (내암집; 來庵集)

== Popular culture ==
- Portrayed by Seo Sang-ik in the 1995 KBS2 TV Series West Palace.
- Portrayed by Han Myung-koo in the 2015 MBC TV series Splendid Politics.

== See also ==
- Cho Sik
- Yi Sanhae
