= Kim Chil =

Korean scholar-official (1422–1478)

Kim Chil 김질

Right State Councillor
- In office 27 September 1474 – 2 August 1475
- Preceded by: Sŏng Pong-jo
- Succeeded by: Yun Sa-hŭng
- In office 4 August 1468 – 3 January 1469
- Preceded by: Kang Sun
- Succeeded by: Yun Sa-bun

Left State Councillor
- In office 20 December 1468 – 23 March 1469
- Preceded by: Pak Wŏn-hyŏng
- Succeeded by: Hong Yunsŏng

Personal details
- Born: 1422; Hanseong, Joseon
- Died: 24 February 1478 (aged 55–56)

Korean name
- Hangul: 김질
- Hanja: 金礩
- RR: Gim Jil
- MR: Kim Chil

Art name
- Hangul: 쌍곡
- Hanja: 雙谷
- RR: Ssanggok
- MR: Ssanggok

Courtesy name
- Hangul: 가안
- Hanja: 可安
- RR: Gaan
- MR: Kaan

Kim Chil (Korean: 김질; Hanja: 金礩; 1422 – February 24, 1478) was a scholar-official of the early Joseon Dynasty. He is remembered today primarily for his participation in, and betrayal of, the conspiracy led by the six martyred ministers.

Kim was born to a family of the Andong Kim clan. His father was a leader of the State Council of Joseon, and his paternal great-grandfather was Kim Sa-hyŏng, who had been a leading supporter of Joseon Dynasty founder Taejo. He passed the kwagŏ examination in 1450, and served in various posts. He was appointed as saye (司藝) of the Sungkyunkwan academy in 1455, a position of the fourth jeong rank. Together with other officials including Sŏng Sammun and Ch'oe Hang, he came to be closely trusted by Munjong, the current king. Munjong died shortly thereafter, and entrusted these officials with looking after his young heir Danjong.

In 1455, Sejo overthrew Danjong and seized the throne for himself. Kim joined other high officials in a conspiracy to return Danjong to the throne. However, he lost heart at the last minute and betrayed the other conspirators to King Sejo. They were arrested and tortured, and many were killed together with their families.

Thereafter Kim was closely trusted by Sejo, and in 1459 he became vice-minister of the military and participated in revisions of national defense policy. In the 1460s, he rose to various minister positions, first in the Ministry of Public Works and then in the Ministry of the Military. In 1466, he served on the State Council of Joseon, a position to which he later returned; in the following year, he was made governor of Gyeongsang Province.

His posthumous name was Munjŏng (문정; 文靖). Kim eventually became a great-great-great-grandfather to Kim Chajŏm.

== Family ==
- Father
  - Kim Chong-suk (김종숙; 金宗淑; ?–1470)
- Mother
  - Lady Yi (이씨)
- Siblings
  - Older brother - Kim Chak (김작; 金碏)
  - Older brother - Kim Chŏk (김적; 金磧)
  - Older brother - Kim Mu (김무; 金碔)
- Wife and children
  - Lady Jeong of the Dongrae Jeong clan (동래 정씨; 東萊 鄭氏; ?–1458)
    - Son - Kim Ŭidong (김의동; 金義童)
    - Son - Kim Yedong (김예동; 金禮童)
    - Son - Kim Chidong (김지동; 金智童)
    - Son - Kim Sŏngdong (김성동; 金誠童; 1452 – 29 October 1495)
    - Son - Kim Yidong (김이동; 金利童)
    - Daughter - Lady Kim of the Andong Kim clan (안동 김씨)

== See also ==
- Joseon Dynasty politics
- List of Joseon Dynasty people
