= Han Myŏnghoe =

Korean politician (1415–1487)

Han Myŏnghoe 한명회

Chief State Councilor
- In office 4 February 1469 – 27 September 1469
- Appointed by: King Sejo
- Preceded by: Pak Wŏnhyŏng
- Succeeded by: Hong Yunsŏng
- In office 26 November 1466 – 9 May 1467
- Appointed by: King Yejong
- Preceded by: Ku Ch'igwan
- Succeeded by: Hwang Susin

Left State Councilor
- In office 30 May 1474 – 22 April 1476
- Appointed by: King Seongjong
- Preceded by: Ch'oe Hang
- Succeeded by: Cho Sŏngmun
- In office October 11, 1463 – March 30, 1464
- Appointed by: King Sejo
- Preceded by: Kwŏn Ram
- Succeeded by: Ku Ch'igwan

Right State Councilor
- In office June 17, 1462 – October 11, 1463
- Appointed by: King Sejo
- Preceded by: Kwŏn Ram
- Succeeded by: Ku Ch'igwan

Personal details
- Born: 26 November 1415 Hansŏng, Joseon
- Died: 28 November 1487 (aged 72) Gwangju-mok, Gyeonggi Province, Joseon
- Spouse(s): Lady, of the Yeoheung Min clan
- Children: Queen Jangsun; Queen Gonghye
- Parents: Han Ki (father); Lady, of the Yeoju Yi clan (mother)
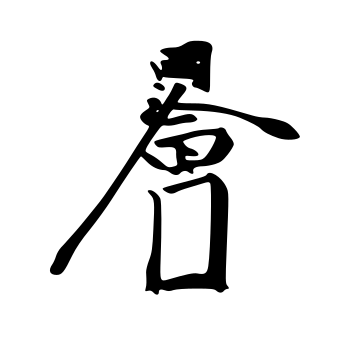
- Signature

Korean name
- Hangul: 한명회
- Hanja: 韓明澮
- RR: Han Myeonghoe
- MR: Han Myŏnghoe

Art name
- Hangul: 압구정, 압구, 사우당
- Hanja: 狎鷗亭, 狎鷗, 四友堂
- RR: Apgujeong, Apgu, Saudang
- MR: Apkujŏng, Apku, Saudang

Courtesy name
- Hangul: 자준
- Hanja: 子濬
- RR: Jajun
- MR: Chajun

Posthumous name
- Hangul: 충성
- Hanja: 忠成
- RR: Chungseong
- MR: Ch'ungsŏng

Han Myŏnghoe (Korean: 한명회; Hanja: 韓明澮; 26 November 1415 – 28 November 1487) was a Korean politician and soldier during the Joseon period.

He was the most trusted tactician of Grand Prince Suyang during the 1453 coup and the subsequent events that resulted in Suyang becoming King Sejo. He was listed as a first rank meritorious subject in 1453 (정난공신) and in 1455 (좌익공신).

In 1460, his third legitimate daughter married Crown Prince Hwang (the future King Yejong). Between 1466 and 1467, Han Myŏnghoe served as chief state councilor, and his fourth legitimate daughter married Prince Jalsan (the future King Seongjong).

In 1468, Crown Prince Hwang became the eighth monarch of Joseon, Han Myŏnghoe's daughter was posthumously honoured as Queen Jangsun, and Han Myŏnghoe himself was reappointed chief state councilor.

When Yejong died in 1470, Han Myŏnghoe was instrumental in the decision to recuse both Yejong's son as too young and Jalsan's elder brother as too weak. As a result, Jalsan was chosen to become King Seongjong, with Han Songyi as his queen (posthumously known as Queen Gonghye).

== Family ==
- Father: Han Ki (한기; 1393–1429)
- Mother: Lady, of the Yeoju Yi clan (정경부인 여주 이씨; 1394–?)
- Sibling(s)
  - Younger sister: Lady Han (한씨; 1420–?)
  - Younger brother: Han Myŏngjin (한명진; 1426–1454)
- Wife: Internal Princess Consort Hwangryŏ, of the Yeoheung Min clan (황려부부인 여흥 민씨; 1414–1479)
  - Daughter: Lady Han (한씨)
  - Daughter: Lady Han (한씨)
  - Daughter: Queen Jangsun (장순왕후; 3 March 1445 – 14 January 1462)
  - Son: Han Po, Prince Nangsŏng (낭성군 한보; 1447–1522)
  - Daughter: Han Songyi (한송이), Queen Gonghye (공혜왕후; 8 November 1456 – 30 April 1474)
- Concubines
  - Lady, of the Yeonil Chŏng clan (연일 정씨; 1415–?) (Note: Concubine-born granddaughter of Chŏng Mong-ju through his concubine-born son, Chŏng Chonghwa (정종화), and was a cousin to Han Myŏnghoe's other concubine called Lady Chŏng.)
    - Son: Han Pok (한복)
    - Son: Han Im (한임)
    - Son: Han Su (한수)
  - Lady, of the Jeonju Yi clan (전주 이씨; 1420–?)
    - Son: Han Mok (한목)
    - Son: Han Sŏk (한석)
    - Son: Han Sŏ (한서)
    - Son: Han U (한우)
    - Son: Han On (한온)
    - Daughter: Lady Han (한씨)
    - Daughter: Lady Han (한씨)
    - Daughter: Lady Han (한씨)
  - Lady, of the Yeonil Chŏng clan (연일 정씨; 1415–?) (Note: Concubine-born granddaughter of Chŏng Mong-ju through his first son, Chŏng Chongsŏng (정종성; 1374–1442).)
  - Lady, of the Changnyeong Sŏng clan (창녕 성씨; 1425–?) (Note: Youngest daughter of Sŏng Suryang (성수량; 1354–?).)

== Ancestry ==
Ancestors of Han Myŏnghoe

Han Kongui (한공의)
Han Su (한수)
Lady, of the Cheongju Gyeong clan (청주 경씨)
Han Sangchil (한상질)
Gwon Jeok (권적)
Lady, of the Andong Gwon clan (안동 권씨)
Han Ki (한기)
Song Sinui (송신의)
Lady, of the Cheongpung Song clan (청풍 송씨)
Han Myŏnghoe
Yi Chonbaek (이천백)
Yi Haeng (이행)
Lady, of the Hwang clan (황씨)
Yi Jeok (이적)
Ryu Suk (류숙)
Lady, of the Seosan Ryu clan (서산 류씨)
Lady, of the Yeoju Yi clan (여주 이씨)
Park Chonsang (박천상)
Park Gaheung (박가흥)
Lady, of the Suncheon Park clan (순천 박씨)

== In popular culture ==
- Portrayed by Kim Jong-gyul in the 2007–2008 SBS TV series The King and I.
- Portrayed by Lee Hee-do in the 2011 KBS2 TV series The Princess' Man.
- Portrayed by Jo Hee-bong in the 2011 SBS TV series Deep Rooted Tree.
- Portrayed by Son Byong-ho in the 2011–2012 JTBC TV series Insu, the Queen Mother.
- Portrayed by Kim Eui-sung in the 2013 film The Face Reader.
- Portrayed by Son Hyun-joo in the 2019 film Jesters: The Game Changers.
- Portrayed by Yoo Ji-tae in the 2026 film The King's Warden.

== See also ==
- Sin Sukchu
- Han Hwak
- Kwŏn Ram
- Chŏng Inji
