= Yŏngŭijŏng =

Title of the Chief State Councilor of Joseon

- 領議政
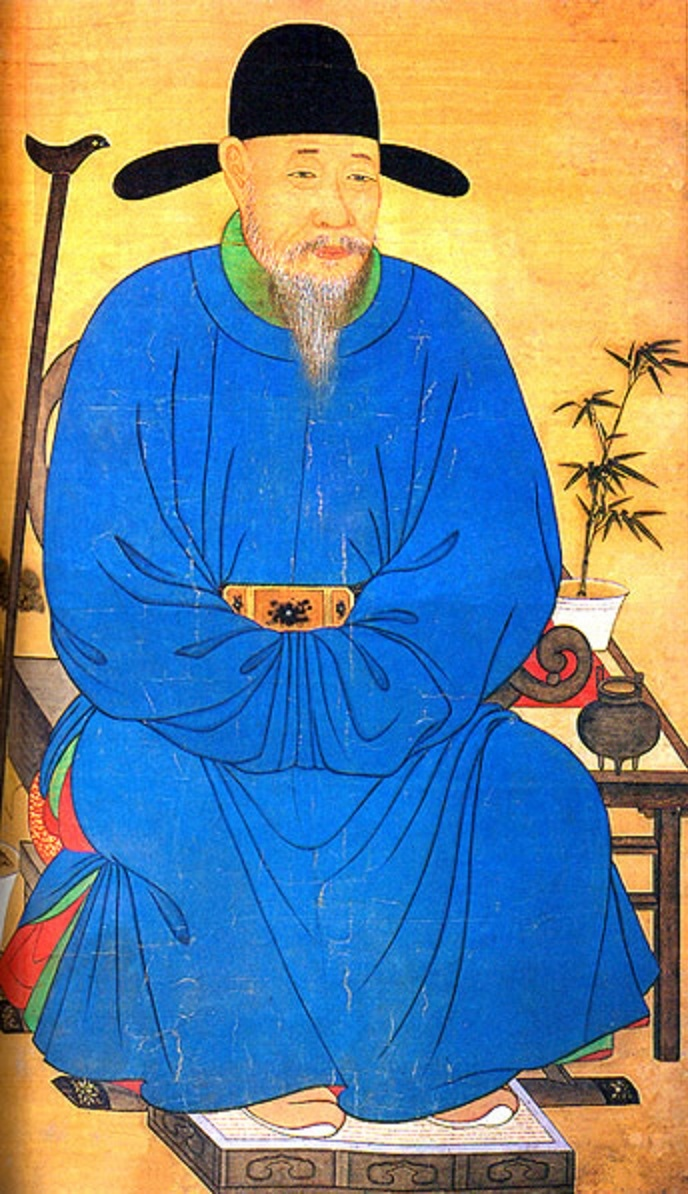
- Portrait of Ha Yeon, who served as Yŏngŭijŏng during King Sejong's reign.
- Member of: State Council of Joseon
- Appointer: King of Joseon
- Term length: Undefined; served until death or an approved retirement
- Formation: 1401
- First holder: Yi Sŏ
- Final holder: Kim Hong-jip
- Abolished: 1894
- Superseded by: Prime Minister of the Korean Empire
- Unofficial names: Yŏngsang, Sangsang, Sugyu or Wŏnbo

- Yŏngŭijŏng
- Hangul: 영의정; 영상; 상상; 수규; 원보
- Hanja: 領議政; 領相; 上相; 首揆; 元輔
- RR: yeonguijeong; yeongsang; sangsang; sugyu; wonbo
- MR: yŏngŭijŏng; yŏngsang; sangsang; sugyu; wŏnbo

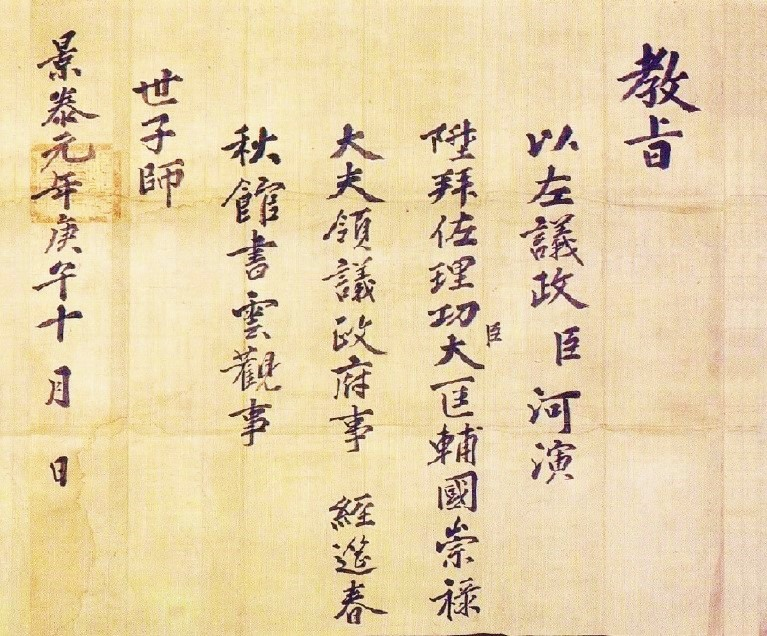
The appointment certificate of the Ha Yeon's Prime Minister

The Yŏngŭijŏng (Korean: 영의정; Hanja: 領議政; pronounced [jʌŋ.ɰi.dʑʌŋ]) or Chief State Councilor was a member of the State Council of Joseon and the highest government position in the Joseon period of Korean history. The Yŏngŭijŏng held roles similar to a modern-day prime minister of a presidential system. As the senior member of the Chief State Council, the Yŏngŭijŏng participated in the administration of general government affairs alongside the Chwaŭijŏng and Uŭijŏng.

The title was created in 1400 with the creation of the State Council. Existing for over 500 years, the function was handed over in 1895 during the Kabo Reform to the newly-formed position of the Prime Minister of the Korean Empire. Only one official, usually an elder who had previously served as Chwaŭijŏng, was allowed to assume the position of Yŏngŭijŏng. The Yŏngŭijŏng was also referred to as Yŏngsang (영상; 領相; lit. 'leading minister of state'), Sangsang (상상; 上相; lit. 'upper minister of state'), Sugyu (수규; 首揆; lit. 'head premier') or Wŏnbo (원보; 元輔; lit. 'primary assistant').

Although the title of Yŏngŭijŏng was legally defined as the highest post in charge of all state affairs, its practical roles and powers shifted drastically throughout history as the roles of the State Council were not clearly defined in the Kyŏngguk taejŏn. During the early years of Joseon, the Yŏngŭijŏng saw limited roles in government as the Six Ministries reported directly to the king.

== History ==
=== Establishment ===
Upon its founding in 1392, the state of Joseon initially inherited the state structure of its predecessor Goryeo (918–1392). In 1400, the second year of his reign, King Jeongjong reformed the Top'yŏngŭisasa ("Privy Council"), which was previously the supreme administrative body of the Goryeo dynasty, to the State Council. The head of the State Council was given the title "Yŏngŭijŏng pusa" (영의정부사; 領議政府事). As both functions of the State Council got stronger and its system was further revised, "Yŏngŭijŏng pusa" was renamed to "Yŏngŭijŏng" in a firm establishment of the office.

In 1466, the position was officially put in statutory form with the finalization of the Kyŏngguk taejŏn. The Yŏngŭijŏng title was generally conferred on a senior minister who had previously served as Chwaŭijŏng (Left State Councilor), a post immediately below that of Yŏngŭijŏng but higher than that of Uŭijŏng (Right State Councillor). The three councilors were collectively known as the "Chŏngsŭng" (정승; 政丞), or "Samŭijŏng" (삼의정; 三議政; lit. 'Three High Councillors').

=== Changes in the role ===
Until April 1436, the 18th year of Sejong the Great's reign, Chwaŭijŏng and Uŭijŏng concurrently served as Panijosa (判吏曹事) and Panbyeongjosa (判兵曹事) respectively, so that they governed personnel affairs of the yangban (the literary and military nobility).

Yŏngŭijŏng continued to exist as an honorary post, and so only managed to contemplate and adjust diplomatic documents or re-examine the cases of condemned people.

However, when Hwang Hŭi was appointed as "Yŏngŭijŏng pusa" in that same year, Sejong modified the government system to strengthen the power of Chŏngsŭng from the Six Ministries centered system. With the reform, Sejong noted that a situation in which three highest senior advisors could not participate in the state affairs contravened the original intention to have them as the high state councillors.

During the reform, Six Ministries conferred with the State Council regarding the responsibilities of each minister. The State Council discussed the legitimacy of the issues and then reported to the king. After receiving an approval from the king, the State Council returned to Yujo to enact the assigned affairs. As a result, Yŏngŭijŏng came to participate more actively in the representative work as the head of the State Council. However, other ministerial duties, such as those of the ministries Ijo (Ministry of Personnel) and Pyongjo (Ministry of Military Affairs) to implement personnel management, Pyongjo's mobilization of soldiers, Hyŏngjo (Ministry of Punishments)'s right to handle all criminals other than condemned people, were still directly operated by the related ministers.

When Prince Suyang usurped the place of his nephew, King Danjong, the function of Yŏngŭijŏng was relegated to its previous powerless position. This was because when the King Sejo was still a prince, his actions were greatly restricted by his political rivals, Yŏngŭijŏng, Hwangbo In and Chwaŭijŏng, Kim Chongsŏ. So during the reigns of King Seongjong and Jungjong, there were several proposals to restore the former powers of the State Council, but those suggestions were not implemented.

Major affairs of the state were discussed when Bibyeonsa was established in 1558 (during the 10th year of King Myeongjong's reign). The three High Councillors attended meetings only as "Tojejo" (Supreme Commissioner). So the power of Yŏngŭijŏng tended to be increased or decreased, depending on the political atmosphere of the times, such as the degree of the king's power, the relationship between the State Council and Six Ministries, the establishment of the Border Defense Council, the later administration of Kyujanggak (the Royal Library), the conflicts between political parties, and the advancement of "in-law government" (세도정치; 勢道政治), among others. Regardless, the title "Yŏngŭijŏng" continued as the apex in the bureaucratic system throughout the entire Joseon period.

== List of Joseon Yŏngŭijŏng ==
Monarch	Portrait	Name	Term of Office (Note: Dates have been converted to Gregorian using the converter tool provided by the Korea Astronomy and Space Science Institute.)			Political Faction	Notes	Ref.
Monarch	Portrait	Name	Took office	Left office	Time in office	Political Faction	Notes	Ref.
Taejong (1400–1418)		Yi Sŏ 이서 李舒	31 August 1401	28 May 1402	1 year, 95 days			
Taejong (1400–1418)		Yi Kŏi 이거이 李居易	28 May 1402	20 December 1402	206 days			
Taejong (1400–1418)		Sŏng Sŏngnin 성석린 成石璘	20 December 1402	3 May 1403	134 days			
Taejong (1400–1418)		Cho Chun 조준 趙浚	12 August 1403	21 July 1404	344 days		Cho Chun served as Left State Councilor from 21 July 1404 to 23 February 1405; he then served a second term as Yeonguijeong until his death on August 1 of the same year.	
Taejong (1400–1418)		Cho Chun 조준 趙浚	23 February 1405	1 August 1405	159 days		Cho Chun served as Left State Councilor from 21 July 1404 to 23 February 1405; he then served a second term as Yeonguijeong until his death on August 1 of the same year.	
Taejong (1400–1418)		Sŏng Sŏngnin 성석린 成石璘	6 August 1405	15 August 1407	2 years, 9 days			
Taejong (1400–1418)		Yi Hwa 이화 李和	15 August 1407	8 February 1408	177 days		Voluntarily retired on 8 February 1408	
Taejong (1400–1418)		Ha Ryun 하륜 河崙	March 17 1408	27 September 1409	1 year, 194 days			
Taejong (1400–1418)		Yi Sŏ 이서 李舒	27 September 1409	26 November 1409	60 days			
Taejong (1400–1418)		Ha Ryun 하륜 河崙	26 November 1409	5 October 1412	2 years, 314 days			
Taejong (1400–1418)		Sŏng Sŏngnin 성석린 成石璘	5 October 1412	15 May 1414	1 year, 222 days			
Taejong (1400–1418)		Ha Ryun 하륜 河崙	15 May 1414	2 July 1415	1 year, 48 days			
Taejong (1400–1418)		Sŏng Sŏngnin 성석린 成石璘	8 December 1415	29 June 1416	204 days			
Taejong (1400–1418)		Nam Chae 남재 南在	29 June 1416	29 November 1416	153 days			
Taejong (1400–1418)		Ryu Chŏnghyŏn 류정현 柳廷顯	29 November 1416	17 July 1418	1 year, 230 days			
Taejong (1400–1418)		Han Sanggyŏng 한상경 韓尙敬	17 July 1418	11 October 1418	86 days		Taejong of Joseon abdicated from the throne on 18 September 1418.	
Sejong (1418–1450)		Han Sanggyŏng 한상경 韓尙敬	17 July 1418	11 October 1418	86 days		-	
Sejong (1418–1450)		Sim On 심온 沈溫	11 October 1418	11 January 1419	92 days			
Sejong (1418–1450)		Ryu Chŏnghyŏn 류정현 柳廷顯	11 January 1419	8 October 1424	5 years, 271 days			
Sejong (1418–1450)		Yi Chik 이직 李稷	8 October 1424	27 June 1426	1 year, 262 days		While Yi Chik's position was transferred to Left State Councilor on 27 June 1426, the Veritable Records provide no mentions of his successor.	
Sejong (1418–1450)		Ku Chonggil (?) 구종길 仇宗吉	1426?	1431?			While Ku Chonggil is recorded to have served as Chief State Councilor from 1426 to 1431 in genealogy records, there are no mentions of him in any official annals of the Joseon dynasty.	
Sejong (1418–1450)		Hwang Hui 황희 黃喜	17 October 1431	30 October 1449	18 years, 13 days		Longest-serving Chief State Councilor.	
Sejong (1418–1450)		Ha Yŏn 하연 河演	30 October 1449	18 August 1451	1 year, 292 days		Sejong died on 8 April 1450.	
Munjong (1450–1452)		Ha Yŏn 하연 河演	30 October 1449	18 August 1451	1 year, 292 days		-	
Munjong (1450–1452)		Hwangbo In 황보인 皇甫仁	29 November 1451	19 November 1453	1 year, 355 days		Munjong died on 10 June 1452.	
Danjong (1452–1455)		Hwangbo In 황보인 皇甫仁	29 November 1451	19 November 1453	1 year, 355 days		Hwangbo In was murdered on 19 November 1453 during Yi Yu, Grand Prince Suyang's coup against his nephew Danjong.	
Danjong (1452–1455)		Yi Yu 이유 李瑈	20 November 1453	4 July 1455	1 year, 226 days		On 4 July 1455, Yi Yu and his associates exiled Danjong's last supporters and forced the young king to abdicate. He would assume the throne the same day.	
Sejo (1455–1468)		Chŏng Inji 정인지 鄭麟趾	3 August 1455	7 March 1458	2 years, 216 days	Hungu		
Sejo (1455–1468)		Chŏng Ch'angson 정창손 鄭昌孫	20 January 1459	31 January 1459	11 days	Hungu	Chŏng Ch'angson voluntarily resigned from Chief State Councilor, insisting that he complete his late mother's funeral rituals.	
Sejo (1455–1468)		Kang Maenggyŏng 강맹경 姜孟卿	9 December 1459	4 June 1461	1 year, 177 days	Hungu	Kang Maenggyong died on 4 June 1461.	
Sejo (1455–1468)		Chŏng Ch'angson 정창손 鄭昌孫	16 June 1461	16 June 1462	1 year, 0 days	Hungu		
Sejo (1455–1468)		Sin Sukchu 신숙주 申叔舟	26 June 1462	9 June 1466	3 years, 348 days	Hungu	The title Yeonguijeong-busa was renamed to Yeonguijeong during Sin Sukchu's first term as Chief State Councilor.	
Sejo (1455–1468)		Ku Ch'igwan 구치관 具致寬	9 June 1466	5 December 1466	179 days	Hungu		
Sejo (1455–1468)		Han Myŏnghoe 한명회 韓明澮	5 December 1466	18 May 1467	164 days	Hungu		
Sejo (1455–1468)		Hwang Susin 황수신 黃守身	18 May 1467	30 June 1467	43 days	Hungu		
Sejo (1455–1468)		Sim Hoe 심회 沈澮	30 June 1467	16 October 1467	108 days	Hungu		
Sejo (1455–1468)		Ch'oe Hang 최항 崔恒	16 October 1467	16 January 1468	92 days	Hungu		
Sejo (1455–1468)		Cho Sŏngmun 조석문 曺錫文	16 January 1468	13 August 1468	210 days	Hungu		
Sejo (1455–1468)		Yi Chun 이준 李浚	13 August 1468	12 January 1469	152 days		Sejo died on 2 October 1468	
Yejong (1468–1470)		Yi Chun 이준 李浚	13 August 1468	12 January 1469	152 days		-	
Yejong (1468–1470)		Pak Wŏnhyŏng 박원형 朴元亨	12 January 1469	12 February 1469	31 days	Hungu	Died in office	
Yejong (1468–1470)		Han Myŏnghoe 한명회 韓明澮	13 February 1469	6 October 1469	235 days	Hungu		
Yejong (1468–1470)		Hong Yunsŏng 홍윤성 洪允成	6 October 1469	15 May 1470	221 days	Hungu	Yejong died on 9 January 1470.	
Seongjong (1470–1495)		Hong Yunsŏng 홍윤성 洪允成	6 October 1469	15 May 1470	221 days	Hungu	-	
Seongjong (1470–1495)		Yun Chaun 윤자운 尹子雲	15 May 1470	13 December 1471	1 year, 212 days	Hungu		
Seongjong (1470–1495)		Sin Sukchu 신숙주 申叔舟	13 December 1471	1 August 1475	3 years, 231 days	Hungu	Died in office	
Seongjong (1470–1495)		Chŏng Ch'angson 정창손 鄭昌孫	11 August 1475	20 April 1485	9 years, 252 days	Hungu	Voluntarily resigned from office.	
Seongjong (1470–1495)		Yun P'ilsang 윤필상 尹弼商	21 April 1485	16 December 1493	8 years, 239 days	Hungu	Voluntarily resigned from office.	
Seongjong (1470–1495)		Yi Kŭkpae 이극배 李克培	23 December 1493	23 April 1495	1 year, 121 days	Hungu	Seongjong died on 29 January 1495.	
Yeonsangun (1495–1506)		Yi Kŭkpae 이극배 李克培	23 December 1493	23 April 1495	1 year, 121 days	Hungu	-	
Yeonsangun (1495–1506)		No Sasin 노사신 盧思愼	23 April 1495	12 or 13 October 1495	173 days	Hungu	Impeached and removed from office	
Yeonsangun (1495–1506)		Sin Sŭngsŏn 신승선 愼承善	30 October 1495	10 May 1497	1 year, 192 days	Hungu		
Yeonsangun (1495–1506)		Han Ch'ihyŏng 한치형 韓致亨	18 May 1500	12 November 1502		Hungu	Died in office.	
Yeonsangun (1495–1506)		Sŏng Chun 성준 成俊	10 February 1503	27 May 1504		Hungu		
Yeonsangun (1495–1506)		Ryu Sun 류순 柳洵	5 June 1504 (?)	19 November 1509		Hungu	Ryu Sun was likely appointed Chief State Councilor on 5 June 1504, when Right State Councilor Hŏ Ch'im was replaced with Pak Sungchil. Ryu is first mentioned as Chief State Councilor on 18 June.	
Jungjong (1506–1544)		Ryu Sun 류순 柳洵	5 June 1504 (?)	19 November 1509		Hungu	Yeonsangun abdicated on 28 September 1506.	
Jungjong (1506–1544)		Pak Wŏnjong 박원종 朴元宗	19 November 1509	23 April 1510		Hungu		
Jungjong (1506–1544)		Kim Sudong 김수동 金壽童	23 April 1510	27 August 1512		Hungu	Died in office	
Jungjong (1506–1544)		Ryu Sunjŏng 류순정 柳順汀	24 November 1512	5 February 1513		Sarim	Died in office	
Jungjong (1506–1544)		Sŏng Hŭian 성희안 成希顔	16 May 1513	6 September 1513		Hungu	Died in office	
Jungjong (1506–1544)		Song Chil 송질 宋軼	3 December 1513	16 August 1514		Hungu		
Jungjong (1506–1544)		Ryu Sun 류순 柳洵	28 October 1514	17 May 1516		Hungu		
Jungjong (1506–1544)		Chŏng Kwangp'il 정광필 鄭光弼	20 May 1516	17 January 1520		Hungu		
Jungjong (1506–1544)		Kim Chŏn 김전 金詮	13 March 1520	9 March 1523		Sarim	Died in office	
Jungjong (1506–1544)		Nam Kon 남곤 南袞	13 May 1523	20 April 1527		Sarim	Died in office	
Jungjong (1506–1544)		Chŏng Kwangp'il 정광필 鄭光弼	24 November 1527	30 June 1533		Hungu		
Jungjong (1506–1544)		Chang Sunson 장순손 張順孫	30 June 1533	27 October 1534		Hungu	Died in office	
Jungjong (1506–1544)		Han Hyowŏn 한효원 韓效元	3 January 1535	11 February 1535		Hungu		
Jungjong (1506–1544)		Kim Kŭnsa 김근사 金謹思	7 May 1535	11 December 1537		Hungu	Impeached and removed from office	
Jungjong (1506–1544)		Yun Ŭnbo 윤은보 尹殷輔	13 December 1537	3 August 1544		Hungu	Died in office	
Injong (1544–1545)		Hong Ŏnp'il 홍언필 洪彦弼	4 February 1545 (?)	before 22 February 1545 (?)			Ambiguous records. (Note: According to the Veritable Records of Injong, Hong Ŏnp'il was appointed Chief State Councilor on 4 February 1545. However, the Veritable Records do not specify his date of resignation. On an entry dated 22 February 1545, however, he is denoted as First Minister-without-Portfolio (영중추부사), an honorary office which served as the titular head of the Military Affairs Commission (중추원) and was often assumed by figures who had previously served as a State Councilor. Judging by these records, it may be inferred that Hong did serve as Chief State Councilor from 4 February to some point before 22 February 1545.)	
Injong (1544–1545)		Yun In'gyŏng 윤인경 尹仁鏡	26 February 1545	2 July 1548			Injong died on 17 August 1545.	
Myeongjong (1545–1567)		Yun In'gyŏng 윤인경 尹仁鏡	26 February 1545	2 July 1548			-	
Myeongjong (1545–1567)		Hong Ŏnp'il 홍언필 洪彦弼	2 July 1548	7 March 1549			Died in office	
Myeongjong (1545–1567)		Yi Ki 이기 李芑	26 June 1549	28 September 1551				
Myeongjong (1545–1567)		Sim Yŏnwŏn 심연원 沈連源	2 October 1551	14 June 1558				
Myeongjong (1545–1567)		Sang Chin 상진 尙震	25 June 1558	19 February 1563				
Myeongjong (1545–1567)		Yun Wŏnhyŏng 윤원형 尹元衡	19 February 1563	19 September 1565				
Myeongjong (1545–1567)		Yi Chun'gyŏng 이준경 李浚慶	19 September 1565	30 June 1571		Sarim	Myeongjong died on 12 August 1567.	
Seonjo (1567–1608)		Yi Chun'gyŏng 이준경 李浚慶	19 September 1565	30 June 1571		Sarim	-	
Seonjo (1567–1608)		Kwŏn Ch'ŏl 권철 權轍	3 May 1573	20 October 1573		Sarim		
Seonjo (1567–1608)		Yi T'ak 이탁 李鐸	26 October 1573	11 May 1574		Sarim		
Seonjo (1567–1608)		Hong Sŏm 홍섬 洪暹	11 May 1574	4 September 1574		Sarim		
Seonjo (1567–1608)		Kwŏn Ch'ŏl 권철 權轍	5 October 1574	August–September 1575		Sarim	Various records on specific dates of tenure during this period have been lost–see footnote. (Note: Various records regarding the dates of tenures of Chief State Councilors during Seonjo's reign have been lost from the Veritable Records of Seonjo due to the Imjin War (1592–1598). While entries on the Revised Veritable Records of Seonjo note the appointment and resignation of some of these Councilors, many of these entries only cite lunar months, not specific dates.)	
Seonjo (1567–1608)		Hong Sŏm 홍섬 洪暹	August–September 1575	September–October 1576		Sarim		
Seonjo (1567–1608)		Kwŏn Ch'ŏl 권철 權轍	September–October 1576	September–October 1578		Sarim	Died in office	
Seonjo (1567–1608)		Hong Sŏm 홍섬 洪暹	December 1578–January 1579	March–April 1579		Sarim		
Seonjo (1567–1608)		Pak Sun 박순 朴淳	March–April 1579	January–February 1585		Westerner		
Seonjo (1567–1608)		No Susin 노수신 盧守愼	May–June 1585	June–July 1588		Easterner		
Seonjo (1567–1608)		Ryu Chŏn 류전 柳琠	March–April 1589	5 December 1589		Sarim	Died in office	
Seonjo (1567–1608)		Yi Sanhae 이산해 李山海	Unknown	11 June 1592		Northerner		
Seonjo (1567–1608)		Yi Yangwŏn 이양원 李陽元	June 1592	June 1592				
Seonjo (1567–1608)		Yu Sŏngnyong 류성룡 柳成龍	June–July 1592	July–August 1592		Southerner		
Seonjo (1567–1608)		Ch'oe Hŭngwŏn 최흥원 崔興源	July–August 1592	17 November 1593		Southerner		
Seonjo (1567–1608)		Yu Sŏngnyong 류성룡 柳成龍	19 November 1593	6 November 1598		Southerner		
Seonjo (1567–1608)		Yi Wŏnik 이원익 李元翼	6 November 1598	17 July 1599		Southerner		
Seonjo (1567–1608)		Yun Tusu 윤두수 尹斗壽	13 September 1599	6 November 1599		Westerner		
Seonjo (1567–1608)		Yi Wŏnik 이원익 李元翼	9 November 1599	before 29 February 1600		Southerner		
Seonjo (1567–1608)		Yi Sanhae 이산해 李山海	7 March 1600	9 June 1600		Northerner		
Seonjo (1567–1608)		Yi Hangbok 이항복 李恒福	26 July 1600	24 March 1602		Westerner		
Seonjo (1567–1608)		Yi Tŏkhyŏng 이덕형 李德馨	26 March 1602	7 May 1604		Southerner		
Seonjo (1567–1608)		Yi Hangbok 이항복 李恒福	16 May 1604	13 June 1604		Westerner		
Seonjo (1567–1608)		Yun Sŭnghun 윤승훈 尹承勳	19 June 1604	15 January 1605		Southerner		
Seonjo (1567–1608)		Ryu Yŏnggyŏng 류영경 柳永慶	24 January 1605	29 March 1608		Smaller Northerner	-	
Gwanghaegun (1608–1623)		Ryu Yŏnggyŏng 류영경 柳永慶	24 January 1605	29 March 1608		Smaller Northerner		
Gwanghaegun (1608–1623)		Yi Wŏnik 이원익 李元翼	29 March 1608	10 September 1609		Southerner		
Gwanghaegun (1608–1623)		Yi Tŏkhyŏng 이덕형 李德馨	3 October 1609	30 September 1611		Southerner		
Gwanghaegun (1608–1623)		Yi Wŏnik 이원익 李元翼	30 September 1611	19 July 1612		Southerner		
Gwanghaegun (1608–1623)		Yi Tŏkhyŏng 이덕형 李德馨	4 September 1612	26 September 1613		Southerner		
Gwanghaegun (1608–1623)		Ki Chahŏn 기자헌 奇自獻	27 February 1614	1 October 1617		Bigger Northerner		
Gwanghaegun (1608–1623)		Chŏng Inhong 정인홍 鄭仁弘	12 February 1618	26 April 1619		Bigger Northerner		
Gwanghaegun (1608–1623)		Pak Sŭngjong 박승종 朴承宗	26 April 1619	13 April 1623		Bigger Northerner		
Injo (1623–1649)		Yi Wŏnik 이원익 李元翼	15 April 1623	29 March 1625		Southerner		
Injo (1623–1649)		Yi Wŏnik 이원익 李元翼	8 September 1625	23 January 1627		Southerner		
Injo (1623–1649)		Yun Pang 윤방 尹昉				Westerner		
Injo (1623–1649)		Sin Hŭm 신흠 申欽				Westerner		
Injo (1623–1649)		O Yun'gyŏm 오윤겸 吳允謙	16 December 1628	22 September 1631		Westerner		
Injo (1623–1649)		Yun Pang 윤방 尹昉				Westerner		
Injo (1623–1649)		Kim Ryu 김류 金瑬				Westerner		
Injo (1623–1649)		Yi Hongju 이홍주 李弘胄				Westerner		
Injo (1623–1649)		Ch'oe Myŏnggil 최명길 崔鳴吉	1638	6 February 1640		Westerner		
Injo (1623–1649)		Hong Sŏbong 홍서봉 洪瑞鳳				Westerner		
Injo (1623–1649)		Yi Sŏnggu 이성구 李聖求				Westerner		
Injo (1623–1649)		Ch'oe Myŏnggil 최명길 崔鳴吉	27 August 1642	8 December 1642		Westerner		
Injo (1623–1649)		Sin Kyŏngjin 신경진 申景禛				Westerner		
Injo (1623–1649)		Sim Yŏl 심열 沈悅				Westerner		
Injo (1623–1649)		Hong Sŏbong 홍서봉 洪瑞鳳				Westerner		
Injo (1623–1649)		Kim Ryu 김류 金瑬				Westerner		
Injo (1623–1649)		Hong Sŏbong 홍서봉 洪瑞鳳				Westerner		
Injo (1623–1649)		Kim Ryu 김류 金瑬				Westerner		
Injo (1623–1649)		Kim Chajŏm 김자점 金自點	1646	22 June 1649		Westerner		
Hyojong (1649–1659)		Yi Kyŏngsŏk 이경석 李景奭				Westerner		
Hyojong (1649–1659)		Yi Kyŏngyŏ 이경여 李敬與				Westerner		
Hyojong (1649–1659)		Kim Yuk 김육 金堉	1 January 1651	17 January 1652		Westerner		
Hyojong (1649–1659)		Chŏng T'aehwa 정태화 鄭太和				Westerner		
Hyojong (1649–1659)		Yi Sibaek 이시백 李時白				Westerner		
Hyojong (1649–1659)		Kim Yuk 김육 金堉	15 August 1655	25 August 1655		Westerner		
Hyojong (1649–1659)		Yi Sibaek 이시백 李時白				Westerner		
Hyojong (1649–1659)		Chŏng T'aehwa 정태화 鄭太和				Westerner		
Hyojong (1649–1659)		Sim Chiwŏn 심지원 沈之源				Westerner		
Hyojong (1649–1659)		Chŏng T'aehwa 정태화 鄭太和				Westerner		
Hyeonjong (1659–1674)		Hong Myŏngha 홍명하 洪命夏				Westerner		
Hyeonjong (1659–1674)		Chŏng T'aehwa 정태화 鄭太和				Westerner		
Hyeonjong (1659–1674)		Hŏ Chŏk 허적 許積	19 June 1671	31 May 1672		Southerner		
Hyeonjong (1659–1674)		Chŏng T'aehwa 정태화 鄭太和				Westerner		
Hyeonjong (1659–1674)		Hŏ Chŏk 허적 許積	6 September 1673	25 April 1674		Southerner		
Hyeonjong (1659–1674)		Kim Suhŭng 김수흥 金壽興				Westerner		
Hyeonjong (1659–1674)		Hŏ Chŏk 허적 許積	27 August 1674	30 April 1680		Southerner		
Sukjong (1674–1720)		Kim Suhang 김수항 金壽恒				Westerner		
Sukjong (1674–1720)		Nam Kuman 남구만 南九萬				Westerner		
Sukjong (1674–1720)		Kim Suhŭng 김수흥 金壽興				Westerner		
Sukjong (1674–1720)		Yŏ Sŏngje 여성제 呂聖齊				Westerner		
Sukjong (1674–1720)		Kwŏn Taeun 권대운 權大運				Southerner		
Sukjong (1674–1720)		Nam Kuman 남구만 南九萬				Soron		
Sukjong (1674–1720)		Ryu Sangun 류상운 柳尙運				Soron		
Sukjong (1674–1720)		Sŏ Munjung 서문중 徐文重				Soron		
Sukjong (1674–1720)		Ch'oe Sŏkchŏng 최석정 崔錫鼎				Soron		
Sukjong (1674–1720)		Sŏ Munjung 서문중 徐文重				Soron		
Sukjong (1674–1720)		Ch'oe Sŏkchŏng 최석정 崔錫鼎				Soron		
Sukjong (1674–1720)		Sin Wan 신완 申琓				Noron		
Sukjong (1674–1720)		Ch'oe Sŏkchŏng 최석정 崔錫鼎				Soron		
Sukjong (1674–1720)		Yi Yŏ 이여 李畬				Noron		
Sukjong (1674–1720)		Sŏ Chongt'ae 서종태 徐宗泰				Noron		
Sukjong (1674–1720)		Yi Yu 이유 李濡				Noron		
Sukjong (1674–1720)		Sŏ Chongt'ae 서종태 徐宗泰				Noron		
Sukjong (1674–1720)		Kim Ch'angjip 김창집 金昌集				Noron		
Gyeongjong (1720–1724)		Cho T'aegu 조태구 趙泰耉				Soron		
Gyeongjong (1720–1724)		Ch'oe Kyusŏ 최규서 崔奎瑞				Soron		
Yeongjo (1724–1776)		Yi Kwangjwa 이광좌 李光佐				Soron		
Yeongjo (1724–1776)		Chŏng Ho 정호 鄭澔				Noron		
Yeongjo (1724–1776)		Yi Kwangjwa 이광좌 李光佐				Soron		
Yeongjo (1724–1776)		Hong Ch'ijung 홍치중 洪致中	1 July 1729	13 August 1732		Noron		
Yeongjo (1724–1776)		Sim Suhyŏn 심수현 沈壽賢				Soron		
Yeongjo (1724–1776)		Yi Ŭihyŏn 이의현 李宜顯				Noron		
Yeongjo (1724–1776)		Kim Hŭnggyŏng 김흥경 金興慶				Noron		
Yeongjo (1724–1776)		Yi Kwangjwa 이광좌 李光佐				Soron		
Yeongjo (1724–1776)		Kim Chaero 김재로 金在魯				Noron		
Yeongjo (1724–1776)		Cho Hyŏnmyŏng 조현명 趙顯命				Soron		
Yeongjo (1724–1776)		Kim Chaero 김재로 金在魯				Noron		
Yeongjo (1724–1776)		Yi Chongsŏng 이종성 李宗城				Soron		
Yeongjo (1724–1776)		Kim Chaero 김재로 金在魯				Noron		
Yeongjo (1724–1776)		Yi Ch'ŏnbo 이천보 李天輔				Noron		
Yeongjo (1724–1776)		Yu Ch'ŏkki 유척기 兪拓基				Noron		
Yeongjo (1724–1776)		Yi Ch'ŏnbo 이천보 李天輔				Noron		
Yeongjo (1724–1776)		Kim Sangno 김상로 金尙魯				Noron		
Yeongjo (1724–1776)		Yi Ch'ŏnbo 이천보 李天輔				Noron		
Yeongjo (1724–1776)		Hong Ponghan 홍봉한 洪鳳漢				Noron		
Yeongjo (1724–1776)		Sin Man 신만 申晩				Noron		
Yeongjo (1724–1776)		Hong Ponghan 홍봉한 洪鳳漢				Noron		
Yeongjo (1724–1776)		Yun Tongdo 윤동도 尹東度				Soron		
Yeongjo (1724–1776)		Sŏ Chisu 서지수 徐志修				Soron		
Yeongjo (1724–1776)		Kim Ch'iin 김치인 金致仁				Noron		
Yeongjo (1724–1776)		Hong Ponghan 홍봉한 洪鳳漢				Noron		
Yeongjo (1724–1776)		Kim Ch'iin 김치인 金致仁				Noron		
Yeongjo (1724–1776)		Kim Sangbok 김상복 金相福				Noron		
Yeongjo (1724–1776)		Sin Hoe 신회 申晦				Noron		
Yeongjo (1724–1776)		Kim Sangbok 김상복 金相福				Noron		
Yeongjo (1724–1776)		Han Ingmoe 한익모 韓翼謩				Noron		
Yeongjo (1724–1776)		Kim Sangbok 김상복 金相福				Noron		
Yeongjo (1724–1776)		Sin Hoe 신회 申晦				Noron		
Yeongjo (1724–1776)		Han Ingmoe 한익모 韓翼謩				Noron		
Yeongjo (1724–1776)		Kim Sangbok 김상복 金相福				Noron		
Yeongjo (1724–1776)		Han Ingmoe 한익모 韓翼謩				Noron		
Yeongjo (1724–1776)		Kim Sangbok 김상복 金相福				Noron		
Yeongjo (1724–1776)		Han Ingmoe 한익모 韓翼謩				Noron		
Yeongjo (1724–1776)		Sin Hoe 신회 申晦				Noron		
Yeongjo (1724–1776)		Han Ingmoe 한익모 韓翼謩				Noron		
Yeongjo (1724–1776)		Kim Sangch'ŏl 김상철 金尙喆				Soron		
Jeongjo (1776–1800)		Kim Yangt'aek 김양택 金陽澤				Noron		
Jeongjo (1776–1800)		Kim Sangch'ŏl 김상철 金尙喆				Soron		
Jeongjo (1776–1800)		Sŏ Myŏngsŏn 서명선 徐命善				Soron		
Jeongjo (1776–1800)		Kim Sangch'ŏl 김상철 金尙喆				Soron		
Jeongjo (1776–1800)		Sŏ Myŏngsŏn 서명선 徐命善				Soron		
Jeongjo (1776–1800)		Chŏng Chon'gyŏm 정존겸 鄭存謙						
Jeongjo (1776–1800)		Sŏ Myŏngsŏn 서명선 徐命善				Soron		
Jeongjo (1776–1800)		Chŏng Chon'gyŏm 정존겸 鄭存謙						
Jeongjo (1776–1800)		Kim Ch'iin 김치인 金致仁						
Jeongjo (1776–1800)		Kim Ik 김익 金熤						
Jeongjo (1776–1800)		Yi Chaehyŏp 이재협 李在協						
Jeongjo (1776–1800)		Kim Ik 김익 金熤						
Jeongjo (1776–1800)		Ch'ae Chegong 채제공 蔡濟恭	2 July 1793	11 July 1793		Southerners		
Jeongjo (1776–1800)		Hong Naksŏng 홍낙성 洪樂性						
Jeongjo (1776–1800)		Yi Pyŏngmo 이병모 李秉模				Noron		
Sunjo (1800–1834)		Sim Hwanji 심환지 沈煥之						
Sunjo (1800–1834)		Yi Sisu 이시수 李時秀						
Sunjo (1800–1834)		Yi Pyŏngmo 이병모 李秉模				Noron		
Sunjo (1800–1834)		Sŏ Maesu 서매수 徐邁修						
Sunjo (1800–1834)		Yi Pyŏngmo 이병모 李秉模				Noron		
Sunjo (1800–1834)		Kim Chaech'an 김재찬 金載瓚						
Sunjo (1800–1834)		Sŏ Yongbo 서용보 徐龍輔						
Sunjo (1800–1834)		Han Yonggwi 한용귀 韓用龜						
Sunjo (1800–1834)		Kim Chaech'an 김재찬 金載瓚						
Sunjo (1800–1834)		Nam Kongch'ŏl 남공철 南公轍						
Sunjo (1800–1834)		Yi Sanghwang 이상황 李相璜						
Sunjo (1800–1834)		Sim Sanggyu 심상규 沈象奎						
Hyeonjong (1834–1849)		Yi Sanghwang 이상황 李相璜						
Hyeonjong (1834–1849)		Cho Inyŏng 조인영 趙寅永						
Hyeonjong (1834–1849)		Kwŏn Tonin 권돈인 權敦仁						
Hyeonjong (1834–1849)		Chŏng Wŏnyong 정원용 鄭元容						
Cheoljong (1849–1864)		Cho Inyŏng 조인영 趙寅永						
Cheoljong (1849–1864)		Kwŏn Tonin 권돈인 權敦仁						
Cheoljong (1849–1864)		Kim Hŭnggŭn 김흥근 金興根						
Cheoljong (1849–1864)		Kim Chwagŭn 김좌근 金左根	3 April 1853	14 February 1859				
Cheoljong (1849–1864)		Chŏng Wŏnyong 정원용 鄭元容						
Cheoljong (1849–1864)		Kim Chwagŭn 김좌근 金左根	20 October 1863	23 May 1864				
Gojong (1864–1897)		Cho Tusun 조두순 趙斗淳						
Gojong (1864–1897)		Yi Kyŏngjae 이경재 李景在						
Gojong (1864–1897)		Kim Pyŏnghak 김병학 金炳學						
Gojong (1864–1897)		Chŏng Wŏnyong 정원용 鄭元容						
Gojong (1864–1897)		Kim Pyŏnghak 김병학 金炳學						
Gojong (1864–1897)		Hong Sunmok 홍순목 洪淳穆						
Gojong (1864–1897)		Yi Yuwŏn 이유원 李裕元	1873	1875		Soron		
Gojong (1864–1897)		Yi Ch'oeŭng 이최응 李最應						
Gojong (1864–1897)		Sŏ Tangbo 서당보 徐堂輔						
Gojong (1864–1897)		Hong Sunmok 홍순목 洪淳穆						
Gojong (1864–1897)		Kim Pyŏngguk 김병국 金炳國				Gaehwa		
Gojong (1864–1897)		Sim Sunt'aek 심순택 沈舜澤	8 December 1884	20 July 1894?		Gaehwa		
Gojong (1864–1897)		Kim Pyŏngsi 김병시 金炳始						
Gojong (1864–1897)		Kim Hong-jip 김홍집 金弘集	25 June 1894?	20 August 1894		Gaehwa		
