= Hong Yunsŏng =

Korean politician, soldier (1425–1475)

Hong Yunsŏng 홍윤성

Chief State Councillor
- In office September 27, 1469 – May 6, 1470
- Preceded by: Han Myŏnghoe
- Succeeded by: Yun Chaun

Left State Councillor
- In office March 23, 1469 – May 6, 1470
- Preceded by: Kim Chil
- Succeeded by: Yun Chaun

Right State Councillor
- In office June 21, 1467 – October 17, 1467
- Preceded by: Ch'oe Hang
- Succeeded by: Kang Sun

Personal details
- Born: 1425
- Died: October 7, 1475 (aged 49–50)

Korean name
- Hangul: 홍윤성
- Hanja: 洪允成
- RR: Hong Yunseong
- MR: Hong Yunsŏng

General Hong Yunsŏng (Korean: 홍윤성; Hanja: 洪允成; 1425–October 7, 1475) was a Korean Joseon Dynasty politician and soldier. He was a member of the court of King Sejo, as the Left and Right State Councillor from 1467 to 1469, and the Chief State Councillor from August 1469 to April 1470 .

His birth name was Usŏng (Korean: 우성; Hanja: 禹成), his art names were Yŏnghae (Korean: 영해; Hanja: 領海), Kyŏnghae (Korean: 경해; Hanja: 傾海), and Kyŏngŭmdang (Korean: 경음당; Hanja: 鯨飮堂), and his courtesy name was Suong (Korean: 수옹; Hanja: 守翁).

== Popular culture ==
- Portrayed by Yoo Sang-jae in 2013 film The Face Reader.

== See also ==
- Han Myŏnghoe
- Sin Sukchu
- Chŏng Inji
- Kwŏn Ram
- Sŏng Sammun
- Hong Tal-son
