= Sin Sukchu =

Korean politician (1417–1475)

Sin Sukchu 신숙주
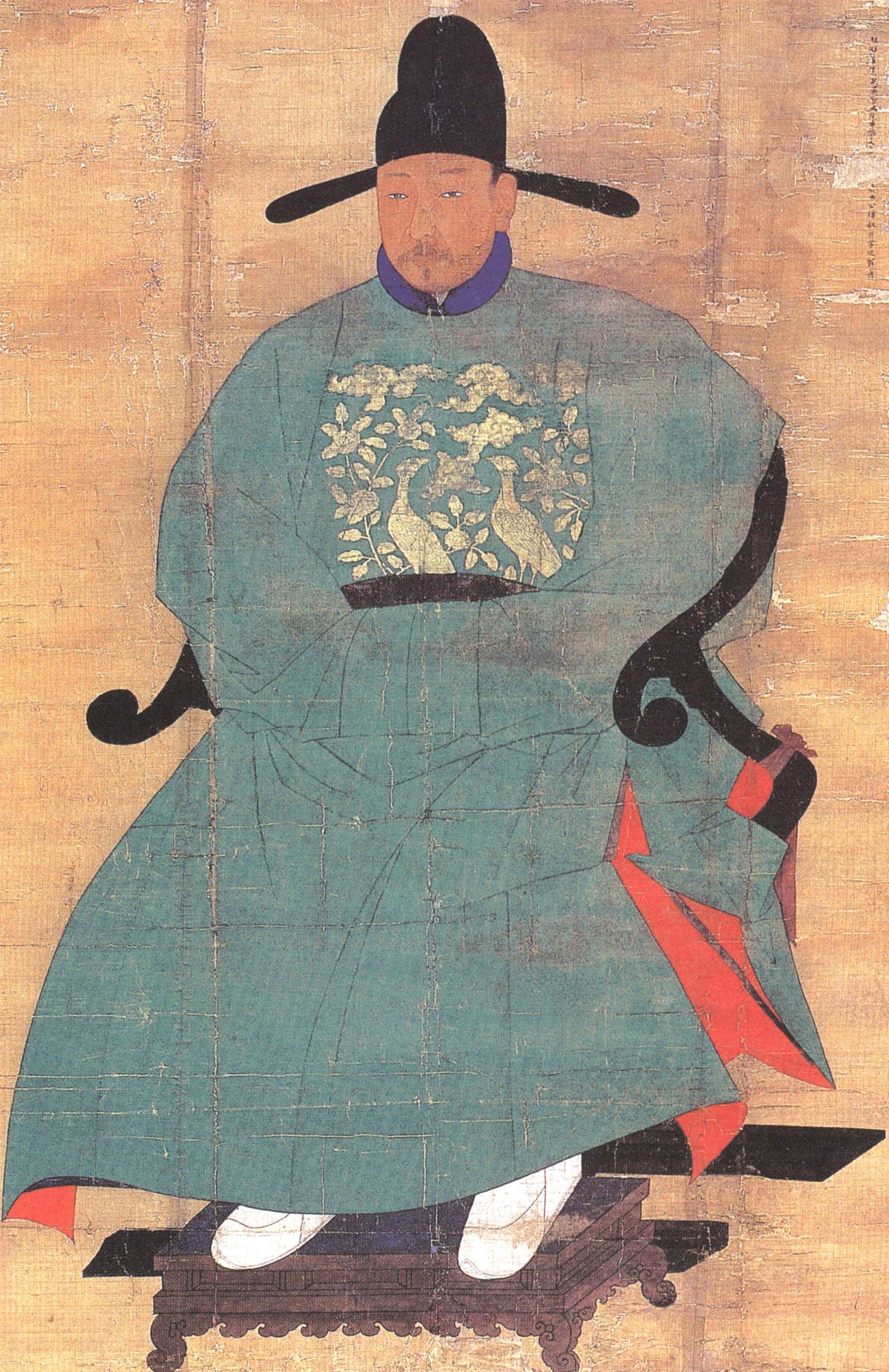

Chief State Councillor
- In office December 4, 1471 – July 23, 1475
- Preceded by: Yun Chaun
- Succeeded by: Chŏng Ch'angson
- In office June 17, 1462 – May 31, 1466
- Preceded by: Chŏng Ch'angson
- Succeeded by: Ku Ch'igwan

Left State Councillor
- In office November 30, 1459 – June 17, 1462
- Preceded by: Kang Maenggyŏng
- Succeeded by: Kwŏn Ram

Right State Councillor
- In office January 11, 1459 – November 30, 1459
- Preceded by: Kang Maenggyŏng
- Succeeded by: Kwŏn Ram

Personal details
- Born: August 2, 1417
- Died: July 23, 1475 (aged 57)
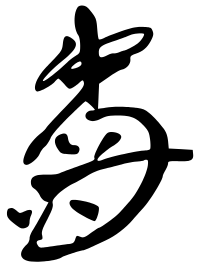
- Signature

Korean name
- Hangul: 신숙주
- Hanja: 申叔舟
- RR: Sin Sukju
- MR: Sin Sukchu

Art name
- Hangul: 희현당, 보한재
- Hanja: 希賢堂, 保閑齋
- RR: Huihyeondang, Bohanjae
- MR: Hŭihyŏndang, Pohanjae

Courtesy name
- Hangul: 범옹
- Hanja: 泛翁
- RR: Beomong
- MR: Pŏmong

Posthumous name
- Hangul: 문충
- Hanja: 文忠
- RR: Munchung
- MR: Munch'ung

Sin Sukchu (Korean: 신숙주; Hanja: 申叔舟; August 2, 1417 – July 23, 1475) was a Korean politician during the Joseon period. He served as Prime Minister from 1461 to 1466 and again from 1471 to 1475. He came from the Goryeong Sin clan (고령 신씨; 高靈 申氏).

Sin was an accomplished polyglot, and was particularly well educated in the Chinese language. He served as a personal linguistic expert to King Sejong, and was intimately involved in the creation and application of the Korean alphabet known in modern times as Hangul. Sin used the newly created hangul system to create an accurate transcription of spoken Mandarin Chinese in 15th century Ming dynasty China. These transcriptions haven proven accurate and reliable, and his transcriptions are now "an invaluable source of information on the pronunciations of Ming-era [Mandarin]."

== Family ==
- Father
  - Sin Chang (신장; 申檣; 1382 – February 8, 1433)
- Mother
  - Lady Chŏng of the Naju Chŏng clan (나주 정씨; 羅州 丁氏) (1390–?)
- Siblings
  - Older brother - Sin Maengchu (신맹주; 申孟舟) (1410–?)
  - Older brother - Sin Chungchu (신중주; 申仲舟; 1413–1447)
  - Older sister - Lady Sin of the Goryeong Sin clan (고령 신씨; 高靈 申氏) (1415–?)
  - Younger sister - Lady Sin of the Goryeong Sin clan (고령 신씨; 高靈 申氏) (1417–?)
  - Younger brother - Sin Songchu (신송주; 申松舟; 1420–1464)
  - Younger brother - Sin Malchu (신말주; 申末舟; 1429–1503)
- Wife and children
  - Princess Consort Musong of the Musong Yun clan (무송군부인 무송 윤씨; 1420 – January 23, 1456); daughter of Yun Kyŏngyŏn (윤경연; 尹景淵)
    - Son - Sin Chu (신주; 申澍; 1434 – February 21, 1456)
    - Son - Sin Myŏn (신면; 申沔; 1438 – May 21, 1467)
    - Son - Sin Ch'an (신찬; 申澯) (1440–?)
    - Son - Sin Chŏng (신정; 申瀞; 1442 – April 24, 1482)
    - Son - Sin Chun (신준; 申浚; 1444 – 1509)
    - Son - Sin Pu (신부; 申溥; 1446 – 1487)
    - Son - Sin Hyŏng (신형; 申泂; 1449–?)
    - Son - Sin P'il (신필; 申泌; 1454 – 1518)
    - Daughter - Lady Sin of the Goryeong Sin clan (고령 신씨; 高靈 申氏; 1455 – ?)
- Concubine
  - Lady Pae (배씨; 裵氏) (1429–?)
    - Son - Sin P'il (신필; 申潔) (1451–?)
    - Daughter - Royal Consort Suk-won of the Goryeong Sin clan (숙원 신씨; 淑媛 申氏) (1455–?)
      - Son-in-law - Sejo of Joseon (조선 세조; November 2, 1417 – September 23, 1468)

== Popular culture ==
- Portrayed by Lee Hyo-jung in the 2011 KBS2 TV series The Princess' Man.

== See also ==
- Han Myŏnghoe
- Chŏng Inji
- Kwŏn Ram
- Hong Yunsŏng
- Hong Tal-son
