= Tojejo =

Government position of Joseon

- Hangul: 도제조
- Hanja: 都提調
- RR: dojejo
- MR: tojejo

Tojejo (Korean: 도제조; Hanja: 都提調) was a government position of the Joseon period in Korea. It was an advisory position or Supreme Commissioner in Sogamun (屬衙門; civil and military jurisdiction) of the Six Ministries or in a military camp. Among the jurisdictions of Six Ministries in the early period of Joseon, important facilities related to King's power or state or diplomatic affairs had Tojejo participate in advising over major issues such as personnel or administrative affairs. Although the post was appointed to incumbent or retired Uijeong (High State Councillors of the State Council) such as Yŏngŭijŏng or Chwaŭijŏng as a concurrent post, the King's relatives concurrently served the post related to Chongbusi (Royal Family Management Office) that dealt with the royal court-related activities.
