= Hŏ Chŏk =

Korean politician (1610–1680)

Hŏ Chŏk 허적
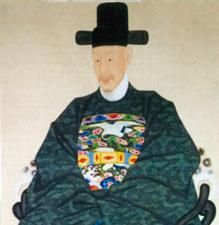

Chief State Councillor
- In office August 27, 1674 – April 30, 1680
- Preceded by: Kim Suhŭng
- Succeeded by: Kim Suhang
- In office September 6, 1673 – April 25, 1674
- Preceded by: Chŏng T'aehwa
- Succeeded by: Kim Suhŭng
- In office June 19, 1671 – May 31, 1672
- Preceded by: Chŏng T'aehwa
- Succeeded by: Chŏng T'aehwa

Left State Councillor
- In office May 8, 1668 – June 19, 1671
- Preceded by: Chŏng T'aehwa
- Succeeded by: Chŏng T'aehwa
- In office June 18, 1667 – November 9, 1667
- Preceded by: Hong Myŏngha
- Succeeded by: Chŏng T'aehwa

Right State Councillor
- In office September 3, 1664 – 1667
- Preceded by: Hong Myŏngha
- Succeeded by: Chŏng Ch'ihwa

Personal details
- Born: 1610 Chungju, North Chungcheong Province, Joseon
- Died: May 11, 1680 (aged 69–70)

Korean name
- Hangul: 허적
- Hanja: 許積
- RR: Heo Jeok
- MR: Hŏ Chŏk

Art name
- Hangul: 묵재, 휴옹
- Hanja: 默齋, 休翁
- RR: Mukjae, Hyuong
- MR: Mukchae, Hyuong

Hŏ Chŏk (Korean: 허적; Hanja: 許積; 1610 – 11 May 11, 1680) was a politician during the Joseon period. He was the 124th and 125th Prime Minister of Korea (Yŏngŭijŏng), in 1664, 1671, and 1674–1680. His art name was Mukjae (묵재; 默齋) and Hyuong (휴옹; 休翁). He came from the Yangcheon Heo clan.

He was the leader of the Southerners faction, and a rival of Song Si-yŏl.

== Family ==
- Father
  - Hŏ Han (허한; 許僩; 1574–1642)
- Mother
  - Kim Kyŏnggae (김경개; 金景介), Lady Kim of the Andong Kim clan (증 정경부인 안동 김씨; 1580–?)

Siblings

- Older brother - Hŏ Ch'i (허치; 許穉; 1604–1636)
- Younger sister - Lady Hŏ of the Yangcheon Hŏ clan (양천 허씨; 陽川 許氏; 1617–?)
- Younger brother - Hŏ Chil (허질; 許秩; 1617–?)
- Younger brother - Hŏ Che (허제; 許穧; 1617–?)
- Younger brother - Hŏ Chin (허진; 許稹; 1620–?)
- Younger sister - Lady Hŏ of the Yangcheon Hŏ clan (양천 허씨; 陽川 許氏; 1628–?); Yi Yŏbal's third wife

Wives and their children

- Lady Yi of the Gwangju Yi clan (증 정경부인 광주이씨; 廣州 李氏; 1618–?); daughter of Yi Sŏ (이서)
  - Son - Hŏ Ak (허악; 許堊; 1644–?)
  - Son - Hŏ Sŏ (허서; 許墅; 1645–?)
- Lady Min of the Yeoheung Min clan (정경부인 여흥 민씨; 驪興 閔氏; 1634–?); daughter of Min Chi'ik (민지익; 閔之釴) — No issue.
- Unnamed concubine (1626–?)
  - Son - Hŏ Kyŏn (허견; 許堅; 1646–1680)
    - Daughter-in-law - Hong Yeyŏng (홍예영), Lady Hong (홍씨; 1645–?)
    - Unnamed daughter-in-law; concubine (1650–?)
  - Son - Hŏ Hu (허후; 許厚; 1648–?)

== Works ==
- Ilgi (일기; 日記)
- Hŏsanggukjuŭi (허상국주의; 許相國奏議)

== See also ==
- Yesong
- Hŏ Mok
- Yun Hyu
- Yun Sŏndo
