= Yi Yuwŏn =

Korean painter (1814–1888)

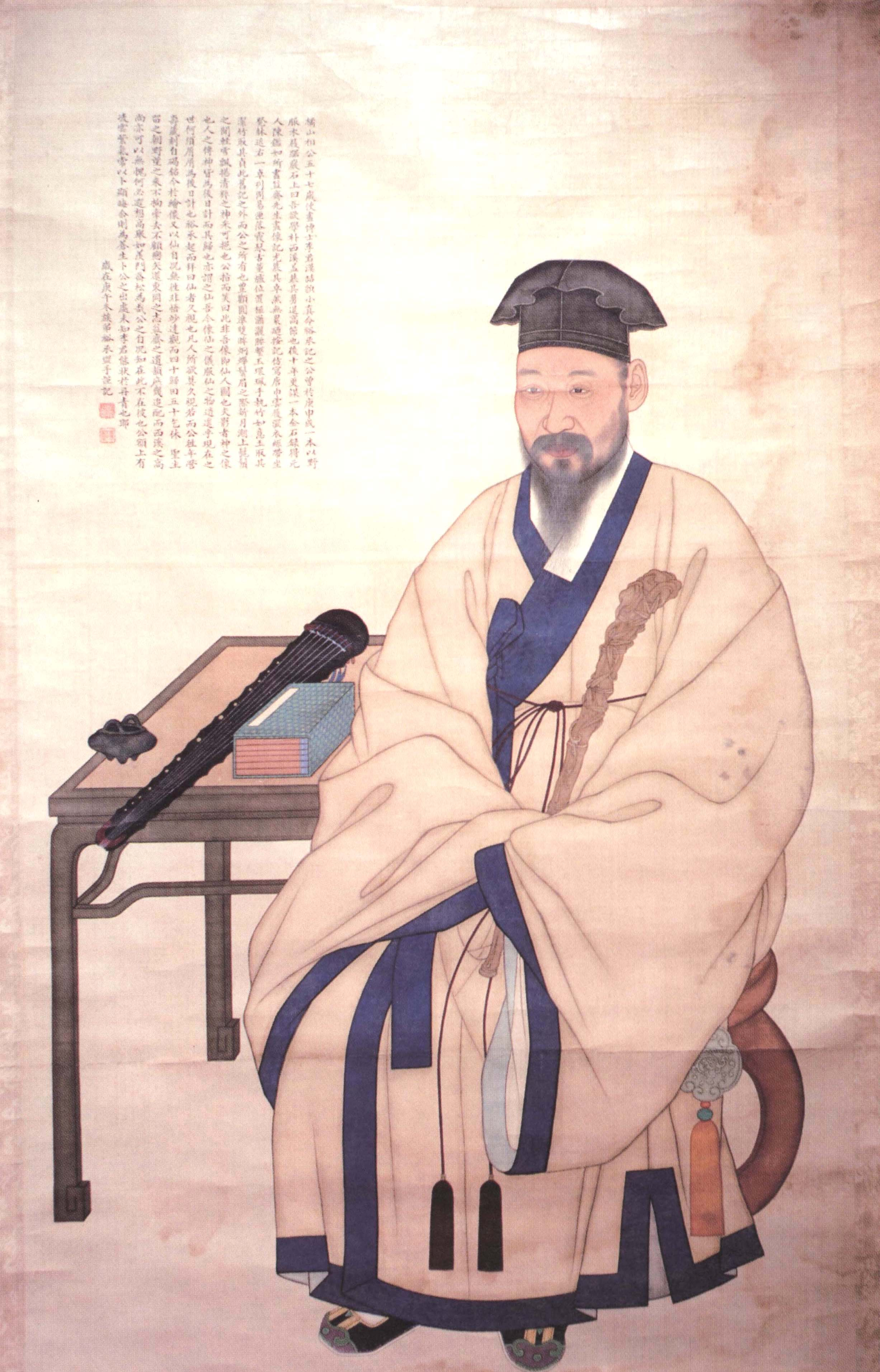
- Painted 1870 by Yi Han-cheol

Korean name
- Hangul: 이유원
- Hanja: 李有源
- RR: I Yuwon
- MR: I Yuwŏn

Yi Yu-won (Korean: 이유원; 1814–1888) was a scholar-official of the late Joseon period. He served as Chief State Councilor (1873–1875) under King Gojong. He excelled in both painting and calligraphy.

== Family ==
Parents

- Father: Yi Gyejo (이계조; 29 April 1792 – 11 October 1805), Minister of Personnel (이조판서)
- Mother: Lady Park, of the Bannam Park clan (반남박씨;b.1754), daughter of Park Jongshin (박종신)

Wives and issues:

- Lady Jeong, of the Dongrae Jeong clan (동래 정씨; 1795년 – 1879), daughter of Jeong Heon-yong (정헌용)
  - Yi Seok-yeong (이석영; 1855–1934), Vice-Minister (참판), adopted son — biological son of Yi Yu-seung (이유승)
    - Daughter-in-law: Daughter of Jeong Gi-cheol (정기철)
    - Daughter-in-law: Lady Park, of the Bannam Park (반남박씨), daughter of Park Injin (박인진)
  - Yi Su-yeong (이수영,d.1880), Secretary (참의), first son
  - Lady Yi, of the Gyeongju Yi clan (경주이씨), first daughter
    - Son-in-law: Jo Yeonbin (조연빈; 1832–1859)
  - Lady Yi, of the Gyeongju Yi clan (경주이씨), second daughter
    - Son-in-law: Jo Jeonghui (조정희), Vice-Minister (참판)
- Unknown concubine
  - Yi Ho-yeong (이호영), a Gunsu (군수), son
    - Daughter-in-law: Daughter of the Yi Jang-ryeom (이장렴)
  - Yi Pyo-yeong (이표영), a Uigwan (의관), son
    - Daughter-in-law: Daughter of Kim Se-ho (김세호)
    - Daughter-in-law: Daughter of Yi Jae-oh (이재오)
  - Lady Yi, of the Gyeongju Yi clan (경주이씨), third daughter
