= Sim Sunt'aek =

Korean politician (1824–1906)

Sim Sunt'aek 심순택
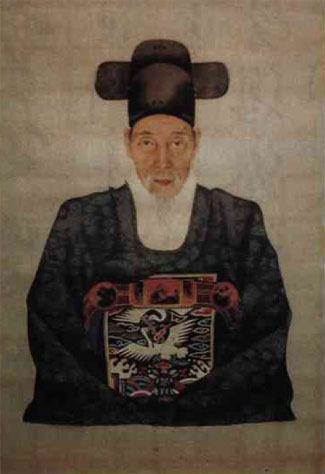

Cabinet Minister of the Korean Empire

Duke Cheongnyeong (청녕공; 靑寧公; given by Gojong in 1906)
- In office 24 September 1898 – 11 October 1898
- Monarch: Gojong
- In office 12 October 1897 – 10 December 1897
- Monarch: Gojong

Cabinet Minister of Joseon
- In office 1 August 1897 – 12 October 1897
- Monarch: Gojong
- Preceded by: Kim Byeong-si
- Succeeded by: as the Cabinet Minister of Korea

Chief State Councillor
- In office 8 December 1884 – 20 July 1894
- Preceded by: Kim Byeong-guk
- Succeeded by: Kim Byeong-si

Left State Councillor
- In office 7 December 1884 – 8 December 1884
- Preceded by: Yi Jae-won
- Succeeded by: Kim Hong-jip

Right State Councillor
- In office 7 October 1884 – 6 December 1884
- Preceded by: Kim Byeong-deok
- Succeeded by: Kim Hong-jip

Personal details
- Born: 1824 Cheongsong, Gyeongsang Province, Joseon
- Died: 1906 (aged 81–82) Hanseong-bu, Korean Empire
- Spouse(s): Lady, of the Hansan Yi clan Duchess, of the Neungseong Gu clan
- Children: Sim Sang-jin (adopted son); 3 daughters
- Parents: Shim Ui-rin (father); Lady, of the Uiryeong Nam clan (mother)
- Relatives: Sim Hun-taek (older brother); Sim Yi-taek (younger brother)

Korean name
- Hangul: 심순택
- Hanja: 沈舜澤
- RR: Sim Suntaek
- MR: Sim Sunt'aek

Courtesy name
- Hangul: 치화
- Hanja: 穉華
- RR: Chihwa
- MR: Ch'ihwa

Duke Sim Sunt'aek or Shim Soon-Taek (1824–1906) was a high-ranking official of the Korean Empire who proposed an anti-Japan policy. He came from the Cheongsong Shim clan. Gojong of Korea awarded the Order of the Plum Blossom to Shim in 1902. In 1906, Shim got the title of Duke. Shim told Gojong that he does not need a title but, Gojong replied him that the reason why he ennobled Shim was because Shim has a lot of merits.

== Family ==
- Father:
  - Sim Ui-rin (심의린; 沈宜麟)
    - Wife: Lady, of the Uiryeong Nam clan (증 정경부인 의령 남씨; 贈 貞敬夫人 宜寧 南氏)
- Wives and children:
  - Lady, of the Hansan Yi clan (정경부인 한산 이씨; 貞敬夫人 韓山 李氏) – No issue.
  - Duchess, of the Neungseong Gu clan (공작부인 능성 구씨; 公爵夫人 綾城 具氏)
    - Adopted son: Sim Sang-jin (심상진; 沈相璡); his biological father was his adopted father's younger brother, Sim Yi-taek (심이택; 沈履澤). So, initially, Sim Sun-taek was Sang-jin's 2nd uncle.
      - Adopted daughter-in-law: Lady, of the Cheongpung Gim clan (부인 청풍 김씨; 夫人 淸風 金氏); daughter of Gim Gyu-hong (김규홍; 金奎弘) and granddaughter of Gim Hak-seong (김학성; 金學性).
        - Adopted grandson: Sim Yeong-seop (심영섭; 沈永燮)
    - 1st daughter: Lady Sim (부인 심씨; 夫人 沈氏)
      - Son-in-law: Gim Byeong-sik (김병식; 金炳軾) of the Andong Gim clan.
    - 2nd daughter: Lady Sim (부인 심씨; 夫人 沈氏)
      - Son-in-law: Yi Jung-cheol (이중철; 李重轍) of the Jeonju Yi clan.
    - 3rd daughter: Lady Sim (부인 심씨; 夫人 沈氏)
      - Son-in-law: Yi Sang-gyu (이상규; 李尙珪) of the Hansan Yi clan.
