= Chwaŭijŏng =

Government position of Joseon

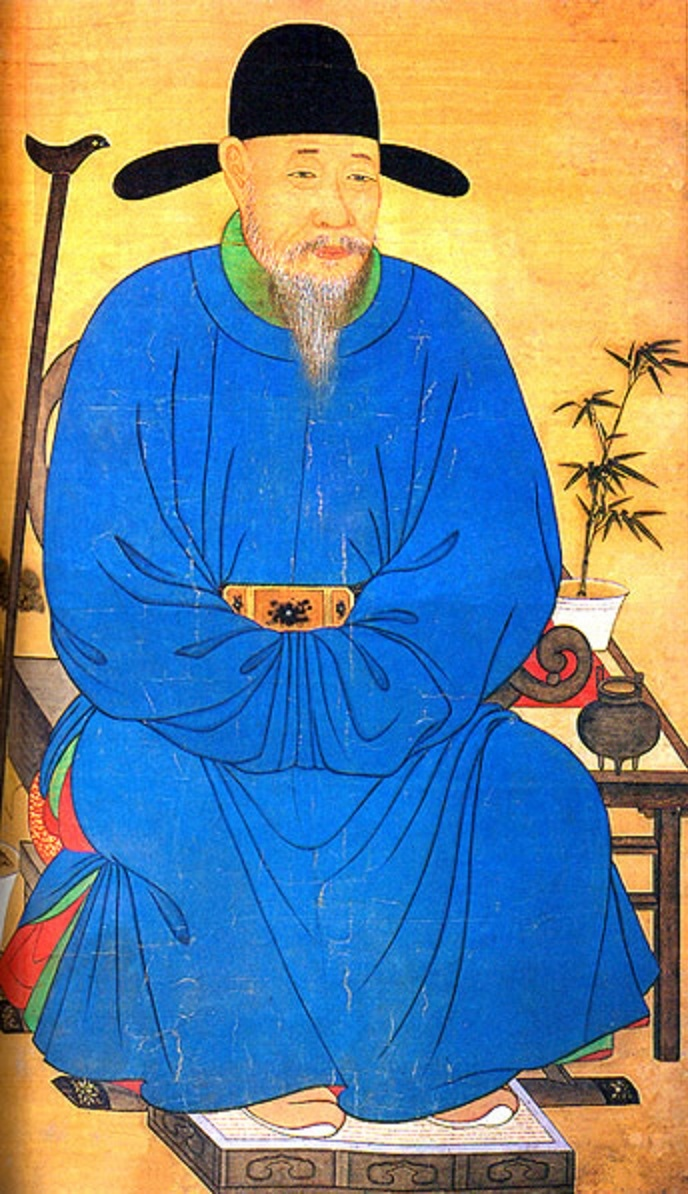
- Portrait of Ha Yŏn, who served as Chwaŭijŏng during the King Sejong's reign.

Korean name
- Hangul: 좌의정; 좌상; 좌정승; 좌규; 좌합; 좌대
- Hanja: 左議政; 左相; 左政丞; 左揆; 左閤; 左臺
- RR: jwauijeong; jwasang; jwajeongseung; jwagyu; jwahap; jwadae
- MR: chwaŭijŏng; chwasang; chwajŏngsŭng; chwagyu; chwahap; chwadae

The Chwaŭijŏng (Korean: 좌의정; Hanja: 左議政; pronounced [tɕwa.ɰi.dʑʌŋ]), also known as the Left State Councilor or Second State Councilor, was a member of the State Council of Joseon. The Chwaŭijŏng was subordinate in rank only to the Yŏngŭijŏng, the highest-ranking official of the Joseon government, during the Joseon period of Korea (1392–1910). Only one official was appointed to the position and was variously referred to as Chwasang, Chwajŏngsŭng, Chwagyu, Chwahap, or Chwadae.

Since its foundation, the Joseon dynasty, which had succeeded to the state apparatus of the Goryeo period (918–1392), had been adjusting its government organization. In 1400, the second year after King Jeongjong came to the throne, he renamed the Top'yŏngŭisasa, the highest organ in charge of the state affairs of Goryeo, to "State Council" and created posts Chwaŭijŏng, Uŭijŏng (Third State Councilor), and Yŏngŭijŏng (Chief State Councilor). The three officials were collectively referred to as the Chŏngsŭng (정승; 政丞) or the Samuijeong ('three high councilors').

== List of Chwaŭijŏng ==
Name			In office	Kings	Notes
Name in English	Name in Hangul	Name in Hanja	In office	Kings	Notes
Pae Kŭngnyŏm	배극렴	裵克廉	1392	Taejo	as Munha Jwasijung (문하좌시중)
Cho Chun	조준	趙浚	1392–1399	Taejo	as Munha Jwajeongseung (문하좌정승)
Sim Tŏkpu	심덕부	沈德符	1399–1400	Jeongjong	as Munha Jwajeongseung
Sŏng Sŏngnin	성석린	成石璘	1400	Jeongjong	as Munha Jwajeongseung
Min Che	민제	閔霽	1400	Jeongjong	as Munha Jwajeongseung
Yi Kŏi	이거이	李居易	1400–1401	Jeongjong	as Munha Jwajeongseung
Kim Sahyŏng	김사형	金士衡	1401–1402	Taejong	as Munha Jwajeongseung
Ha Ryun	하륜	河崙	1402–1404	Taejong	as Munha Jwajeongseung
Cho Chun	조준	趙浚	1404–1405	Taejong	as Munha Jwajeongseung
Ha Ryun	하륜	河崙	1405–1407	Taejong	as Munha Jwajeongseung
Sŏng Sŏngnin	성석린	成石璘	1407–1412	Jeongjong	as Munha Jwajeongseung
Ha Ryun	하륜	河崙	1412–1414	Taejong	as Munha Jwajeongseung
Nam Chae	남재	南在	1414–1415	Taejong	
Ha Ryun	하륜	河崙	1415–1416	Taejong	
Yu Chŏnghyŏn	유정현	柳廷顯	1416	Taejong	
Pak Ŭn	박은	朴訔	1416–1421	Taejong	
Yi Wŏn	이원	李原	1421–1426	Sejong	
Yu Chŏnghyŏn	류정현	柳廷顯	1426	Taejong	
Yi Chik	이직	李稷	1426–1427	Sejong	
Hwang Hŭi	황희	黃喜	1427–1430	Sejong	
Maeng Sasŏng	맹사성	孟思誠	1431–1435	Sejong	
Ch'oe Yundŏk	최윤덕	崔閏德	1435–1436	Sejong	
Hŏ Cho	허조	許稠	1439	Sejong	
Sin Kae	신개	申槩	1445–1446	Sejong	
Ha Yŏn	하연	河演	1447–1449	Sejong	
Hwangbo In	황보인	皇甫仁	1449–1451	Sejong	
Nam Chi	남지	南智	1451–1452	Munjong	
Kim Chongsŏ	김종서	金宗瑞	1452–1453	Danjong	
Chŏng Inji	정인지	鄭麟趾	1453–1455	Danjong	
Han Hwak	한확	韓確	1455–1456	Sejo	
Yi Sach'ŏl	이사철	李思哲	1456	Sejo	
Chŏng Ch'angson	정창손	鄭昌孫	1457–1458	Sejo	
Kang Maenggyŏng	강맹경	姜孟卿	1458–1459	Sejo	
Sin Sukchu	신숙주	申叔舟	1459–1462	Sejo	
Kwŏn Ram	권람	權擥	1462–1463	Sejo	
Han Myŏnghoe	한명회	韓明澮	1463–1464	Sejo	
Ku Ch'ikwan	구치관	具致寬	1464–1466	Sejo	
Hwang Susin	황수신	黃守身	1466	Sejo	
Sim Hoe	심회	沈澮	1466–1467	Sejo	
Ch'oe Hang	최항	崔恒	1467	Sejo	
Cho Sŏngmun	조석문	曺錫文	1467	Sejo	
Hong Tal-son	홍달손	洪達孫	1467–1468	Sejo	
Pak Wŏnhyŏng	박원형	朴元亨	1468	Sejo	
Kim Chil	김질	金礩	1468–1469	Yejong	
Hong Yunsŏng	홍윤성	洪允成	1469	Yejong	
Yun Chaun	윤자운	尹子雲	1469–1470	Yejong	
Kim Kukgwang	김국광	金國光	1470–1471	Seongjong	
Ch'oe Hang	최항	崔恒	1471–1474	Seongjong	
Han Myŏnghoe	한명회	韓明澮	1474–1476	Seongjong	
Cho Sŏngmun	조석문	曺錫文	1476	Seongjong	
Sim Hoe	심회	沈澮	1476–1479	Seongjong	
Yun P'ilsang	윤필상	尹弼商	1479–1485	Seongjong	
Hong Ŭng	홍응	洪應	1485–1492	Seongjong	
No Sa-sin	노사신	盧思愼	1492–1495	Seongjong	
Sin Sŭngsŏn	신승선	愼承善	1495	Yeonsangun	
Chŏng Kwal	정괄	鄭佸	1495	Yeonsangun	
Ŏ Segyŏm	어세겸	魚世謙	1496–1498	Yeonsangun	
Han Ch'ihyŏng	한치형	韓致亨	1498–1500	Yeonsangun	
Sŏng Chun	성준	成俊	1500–1503	Yeonsangun	
Yi Kŭkkyun	이극균	李克均	1503–1504	Yeonsangun	
Yu Sun	유순	柳洵	1504	Yeonsangun	
Hŏ Ch'im	허침	許琛	1504–1505	Yeonsangun	
Pak Sungjil	박숭질	朴崇質	1505–1506	Yeonsangun	
Sin Sugŭn	신수근	愼守勤	1506	Yeonsangun	
Kim Sudong	김수동	金壽童	1506	Jungjong	
Pak Wŏnjong	박원종	朴元宗	1506–1509	Jungjong	
Yu Sunjŏng	유순정	柳順汀	1509–1512	Jungjong	
Sŏng Hŭian	성희안	成希顔	1512–1513	Jungjong	
Song Chil	송질	宋軼	1513	Jungjong	
Chŏng Kwangp'il	정광필	鄭光弼	1513–1516	Jungjong	
Kim Ŭnggi	김응기	金應箕	1516–1518	Jungjong	
Sin Yong-gae	신용개	申用漑	1518–1519	Jungjong	
An Tang	안당	安瑭	1519	Jungjong	
Nam Kon	남곤	南袞	1519–1523	Jungjong	
Yi Yuch'ŏng	이유청	李惟淸	1523–1527	Jungjong	
Chŏng Kwangp'il	정광필	鄭光弼	1527	Jungjong	
Sim Chŏng	심정	沈貞	1527–1530	Jungjong	
Yi Hang	이항	李沆	1530–1531	Jungjong	
Chang Sunson	장순손	張順孫	1531–1533	Jungjong	
Han Hyowŏn	한효원	韓效元	1533–1534	Jungjong	
Kim Kŭnsa	김근사	金謹思	1534–1535	Jungjong	
Kim Allo	김안로	金安老	1535–1537	Jungjong	
Yun Ŭnbo	윤은보	尹殷輔	1537	Jungjong	
Yu Pu	유부	柳溥	1537	Jungjong	
Hong Ŏnp'il	홍언필	洪彦弼	1537–1545	Jungjong	
Yun In-gyŏng	윤인경	尹仁鏡	1545	Injong	
Yu Kwan	유관	柳灌	1545	Injong	
Sŏng Sech'ang	성세창	成世昌	1545	Myeongjong	
Yi Ki	이기	李芑	1545–1548	Myeongjong	
Hong Ŏnp'il	홍언필	洪彦弼	1548	Myeongjong	
Yun Ingyŏng	윤인경	尹仁鏡	1548	Myeongjong	
Hwang Hŏn	황헌	黃憲	1548–1549	Myeongjong	
Sim Yŏnwŏn	심연원	沈連源	1549–1551	Myeongjong	
Sang Chin	상진	尙震	1551–1558	Myeongjong	
Yun Kae	윤개	尹漑	1558	Myeongjong	
An Hyŏn	안현	安玹	1558–1560	Myeongjong	
Yi Chungyŏng	이준경	李浚慶	1560–1564	Myeongjong	
Sim T'ongwŏn	심통원	沈通源	1564–1565	Myeongjong	
Yi Myŏng	이명	李蓂	1565–1567	Myeongjong, Seonjo	
Kwon Ch'ŏl	권철	權轍	1567–1571	Seonjo	
Hong Sŏm	홍섬	洪暹	1571–1573	Seonjo	
Pak Sun	박순	朴淳	1573–1574	Seonjo	
Yi T'ak	이탁	李鐸	1574	Seonjo	
Pak Sun	박순	朴淳	1574–1576	Seonjo	
Hong Sŏm	홍섬	洪暹	1576–1578	Seonjo	
No Susin	노수신	盧守愼	1578–1581	Seonjo	
Kim Kwiyŏng	김귀영	金貴榮	1581–1583	Seonjo	
Chŏng Yugil	정유길	鄭惟吉	1583–1584	Seonjo	
No Susin	노수신	盧守愼	1584–1585	Seonjo	
Chŏng Yugil	정유길	鄭惟吉	1585–1588	Seonjo	
Yu Chŏn	유전	柳琠	1588–1589	Seonjo	
Yi Sanhae	이산해	李山海	1589–1590	Seonjo	
Chŏng Ch'ŏl	정철	鄭澈	1590–1591	Seonjo	
Yu Sŏngnyong	유성룡	柳成龍	1591–1592	Seonjo	
Yi Yangwŏn	이양원	李陽元	1592	Seonjo	
Ch'oe Hŭngwŏn	최흥원	崔興源	1592	Seonjo	
Yun Tusu	윤두수	尹斗壽	1592–1594	Seonjo	
Yu Hong	유홍	兪泓	1594	Seonjo	
Kim Ŭngnam	김응남	金應南	1595–1597	Seonjo	
Yun Tusu	윤두수	尹斗壽	1598	Seonjo	
Yi Wŏnik	이원익	李元翼	1598	Seonjo	
Yi Tŏkhyŏng	이덕형	李德馨	1598–1599	Seonjo	
Sim Sugyŏng	심수경	沈守慶	1599	Seonjo	
Yi Tŏkhyŏng	이덕형	李德馨	1599	Seonjo	
Yi Hangbok	이항복	李恒福	1599	Seonjo	
Yi Tŏkhyŏng	이덕형	李德馨	1599	Seonjo	
Yi Hŏn'guk	이헌국	李憲國	1599–1600	Seonjo	
Yi Hangbok	이항복	李恒福	1600	Seonjo	
Chŏng T'ak	정탁	鄭琢	1600	Seonjo	
Yi Wŏnik	이원익	李元翼	1600	Seonjo	
Yi Hangbok	이항복	李恒福	1600	Seonjo	
Yi Hŏn'guk	이헌국	李憲國	1600–1601	Seonjo	
Kim Myŏngwŏn	김명원	金命元	1601–1602	Seonjo	
Yun Sŭnghun	윤승훈	尹承勳	1602–1604	Seonjo	
Yu Yŏnggyŏng	유영경	柳永慶	1604	Seonjo	
Ki Chahŏn	기자헌	奇自獻	1604–1606	Seonjo	
Sim Hŭisu	심희수	沈喜壽	1606	Seonjo	
Hŏ Uk	허욱	許頊	1606–1608	Seonjo	
Ki Chahŏn	기자헌	奇自獻	1608	Gwanghaegun	
Yi Hangbok	이항복	李恒福	1608–1611	Gwanghaegun	
Yi Tŏkhyŏng	이덕형	李德馨	1611–1612	Gwanghaegun	
Yi Hang-bok	이항복	李恒福	1612–1613	Gwanghaegun	
Chŏng Inhong	정인홍	鄭仁弘	1614–1617	Gwanghaegun	
Chŏng Ch'angyŏn	정창연	鄭昌衍	1617–1618	Gwanghaegun	
Han Hyosun	한효순	韓孝純	1618	Gwanghaegun	
Min Mongryong	민몽룡	閔夢龍	1618	Gwanghaegun	
Pak Sŭngjong	박승종	朴承宗	1618–1619	Gwanghaegun	
Pak Honggu	박홍구	朴弘耉	1619–1623	Gwanghaegun	
Chŏng Ch'angyŏn	정창연	鄭昌衍	1623	Injo	
Yun Pang	윤방	尹昉	1623–1627	Injo	
Sin Hŭm	신흠	申欽	1627	Injo	
O Yun'gyŏm	오윤겸	吳允謙	1627–1628	Injo	
Kim Ryu	김류	金瑬	1628–1631	Injo	
Yi Chŏnggu	이정구	李廷龜	1631–1632	Injo	
Kim Ryu	김류	金瑬	1633	Injo	
O Yun'gyŏm	오윤겸	吳允謙	1633–1636	Injo	
Hong Sŏbong	홍서봉	洪瑞鳳	1636–1637	Injo	
Yi Sŏnggu	이성구	李聖求	1637	Injo	
Ch'oe Myŏnggil	최명길	崔鳴吉	1637–1638	Injo	
Sin Kyŏngjin	신경진	申景禛	1638–1643	Injo	
Sin Yŏl	심열	沈悅	1643	Injo	
Sin Kiwŏn	심기원	沈器遠	1643	Injo	
Kim Chajŏm	김자점	金自點	1643–1644	Injo	
Sin Yŏl	심열	沈悅	1644	Injo	
Hong Sŏbong	홍서봉	洪瑞鳳	1644	Injo	
Sin Yŏl	심열	沈悅	1644–1645	Injo	
Hong Sŏbong	홍서봉	洪瑞鳳	1645	Injo	
Kim Chajŏm	김자점	金自點	1646	Injo	
Kim Sanghŏn	김상헌	金尙憲	1646	Injo	
Yi Kyŏngsŏk	이경석	李景奭	1647	Injo	
Nam Iung	남이웅	南以雄	1648	Injo	
Yi Kyŏngsŏk	이경석	李景奭	1648–1649	Injo	
Kim Sanghŏn	김상헌	金尙憲	1649	Hyojong	
Chŏng T'aehwa	정태화	鄭太和	1649	Hyojong	
Cho Ik	조익	趙翼	1649–1650	Hyojong	
Chŏng T'aehwa	정태화	鄭太和	1650	Hyojong	
Cho Ik	조익	趙翼	1649–1650	Hyojong	
Yi Sibaek	이시백	李時白	1650–1651	Hyojong	
Kim Yuk	김육	金堉	1651–1654	Hyojong	
Yi Sibaek	이시백	李時白	1654	Hyojong	
Ku Inhu	구인후	具仁垕	1654–1656	Hyojong	
Sim Chiwŏn	심지원	沈之源	1656–1657	Hyojong	
Wŏn Tup'yo	원두표	元斗杓	1657–1659	Hyojong	
Sim Chiwŏn	심지원	沈之源	1659–1662	Hyeonjong	
Wŏn Tup'yo	원두표	元斗杓	1662–1664	Hyeonjong	
Hong Myŏngha	홍명하	洪命夏	1664–1667	Hyeonjong	
Hŏ Chŏk	허적	許積	1667	Hyeonjong	
Chŏng Ch'ihwa	정치화	鄭致和	1668	Hyeonjong	
Hŏ Chŏk	허적	許積	1668–1671	Hyeonjong	
Chŏng Ch'ihwa	정치화	鄭致和	1671–1672	Hyeonjong	
Song Si-yŏl	송시열	宋時烈	1672	Hyeonjong	
Kim Su-hang	김수항	金壽恒	1672–1673	Hyeonjong	
Yi Kyŏngŏk	이경억	李慶億	1673	Hyeonjong	
Song Si-yŏl	송시열	宋時烈	1673	Hyeonjong	
Chŏng Ch'ihwa	정지화	鄭知和	1674	Hyeonjong	
Kim Suhang	김수항	金壽恒	1674	Hyeonjong	
Chŏng Ch'ihwa	정치화	鄭致和	1674–1675	Sukjong	
Kim Suhang	김수항	金壽恒	1675	Sukjong	
Kwŏn Taeun	권대운	權大運	1675–1679	Sukjong	
Min Hŭi	민희	閔熙	1679–1680	Sukjong	
Chŏng Ch'ihwa	정지화	鄭知和	1680	Sukjong	
Min Chŏng-jung	민정중	閔鼎重	1680–1684	Sukjong	
Chŏng Ch'ihwa	정지화	鄭知和	1684–1685	Sukjong	
Min Chŏngjung	민정중	閔鼎重	1685	Sukjong	
Chŏng Ch'ihwa	정지화	鄭知和	1685	Sukjong	
Nam Kuman	남구만	南九萬	1685–1687	Sukjong	
Yi Tanha	이단하	李端夏	1687	Sukjong	
Cho Sasŏk	조사석	趙師錫	1688–1689	Sukjong	
Ye Sŏngje	여성제	呂聖齊	1689	Sukjong	
Mok Naesŏn	목내선	睦來善	1689–1694	Sukjong	
Min Am	민암	閔黯	1694	Sukjong	
Pak Sech'ae	박세채	朴世采	1694–1695	Sukjong	
Yu Sang-un	유상운	柳尙運	1695–1696	Sukjong	
Yun Chisŏn	윤지선	尹趾善	1696–1698	Sukjong	
Yi Sebaek	이세백	李世白	1698–1699	Sukjong	
Choi Seok-jeong	최석정	崔錫鼎	1699	Sukjong	
Yi Sebaek	이세백	李世白	1700–1703	Sukjong	
Sin Wan	신완	申琓	1703	Sukjong	
Yi Ye	이여	李畲	1703–1705	Sukjong	
Sŏ Chongt'ae	서종태	徐宗泰	1706–1707	Sukjong	
Kim Ch'angjip	김창집	金昌集	1707	Sukjong	
Yi Yu	이유	李濡	1707–1708	Sukjong	
Yi Imyŏng	이이명	李頣命	1709	Sukjong	
Sŏ Chongt'ae	서종태	徐宗泰	1709–1711	Sukjong	
Kim Ch'angjip	김창집	金昌集	1711–1712	Sukjong	
Sŏ Chongt'ae	서종태	徐宗泰	1712	Sukjong	
Yi Imyŏng	이이명	李頣命	1713	Sukjong	
Kim Changjip	김창집	金昌集	1713–1717	Sukjong	
Yi Imyŏng	이이명	李頣命	1717	Sukjong	
Gwon Sang-ha	권상하	權尙夏	1717–1720	Sukjong	
Yi Kŏnmyŏng	이건명	李健命	1720–1721	Gyeongjong	
Ch'oe Kyusŏ	최규서	崔奎瑞	1721–1723	Gyeongjong	
Ch'oe Sŏkhang	최석항	崔錫恒	1723–1724	Gyeongjong	
Yi Kwang-jwa	이광좌	李光佐	1724	Yeongjo	
Yu Ponghwi	유봉휘	柳鳳輝	1724–1725	Yeongjo	
Jo Tae-eok	조태억	趙泰億	1725	Yeongjo	
Chŏng Ho	정호	鄭澔	1725	Yeongjo	
Min Chinwŏn	민진원	閔鎭遠	1725–1726	Yeongjo	
Hong Chi-jung	홍치중	洪致中	1726–1727	Yeongjo	
Jo Tae-eok	조태억	趙泰億	1727–1728	Yeongjo	
Hong Chi-jung	홍치중	洪致中	1728–1729	Yeongjo	
Yi T'ae-jwa	이태좌	李台佐	1729	Yeongjo	
Yi Chip	이집	李㙫	1730–1731	Yeongjo	
Cho Munmyŏng	조문명	趙文命	1732	Yeongjo	
Sŏ Myŏnggyun	서명균	徐命均	1732–1735	Yeongjo	
Kim Chaero	김재로	金在魯	1735–1740	Yeongjo	
Song Inmyŏng	송인명	宋寅明	1740–1746	Yeongjo	
Chŏng Sŏko	정석오	鄭錫五	1746–1747	Yeongjo	
Cho Hyŏnmyŏng	조현명	趙顯命	1747–1749	Yeongjo	
Kim Yakro	김약로	金若魯	1749–1751	Yeongjo	
Cho Hyŏnmyŏng	조현명	趙顯命	1751	Yeongjo	
Yi Chongsŏng	이종성	李宗城	1752	Yeongjo	
Yi Ch'ŏn-bo	이천보	李天輔	1752–1754	Yeongjo	
Kim Sangno	김상로	金尙魯	1754–1758	Yeongjo	
Sin Man	신만	申晩	1758–1759	Yeongjo	
Kim Sangno	김상로	金尙魯	1759	Yeongjo	
Sin Man	신만	申晩	1759–1760	Yeongjo	
Yi Hu	이후	李𪻶	1760–1761	Yeongjo	
Hong Ponghan	홍봉한	洪鳳漢	1761	Yeongjo	
Chŏng Hwiryang	정휘량	鄭翬良	1761	Yeongjo	
Hong Ponghan	홍봉한	洪鳳漢	1762–1763	Yeongjo	
Yun Tongdo	윤동도	尹東度	1763–1765	Yeongjo	
Kim Sangbok	김상복	金相福	1765–1766	Yeongjo	
Kim Ch'i-in	김치인	金致仁	1766	Yeongjo	
Yun Tongdo	윤동도	尹東度	1766	Yeongjo	
Han Ikmo	한익모	韓翼謩	1766–1768	Yeongjo	
Kim Yangt'aek	김양택	金陽澤	1768	Yeongjo	
Han Ik-mo	한익모	韓翼謩	1768	Yeongjo	
Kim Yangt'aek	김양택	金陽澤	1768–1769	Yeongjo	
Kim Sangbok	김상복	金相福	1769–1770	Yeongjo	
Han Ikmo	한익모	韓翼謩	1770–1772	Yeongjo	
Sin Hoe	신회	申晦	1772	Yeongjo	
Yi Ŭn	이은	李溵	1772	Yeongjo	
Kim Sangch'ŏl	김상철	金尙喆	1772	Yeongjo	
Yi Ch'angŭi	이창의	李昌誼	1772	Yeongjo	
Kim Sangch'ŏl	김상철	金尙喆	1772	Yeongjo	
Yi Ŭn	이은	李溵	1772–1773	Yeongjo	
Kim Sangch'ŏl	김상철	金尙喆	1773–1774	Yeongjo	
Yi Ŭn	이은	李溵	1774	Yeongjo	
Kim Sangch'ŏl	김상철	金尙喆	1774	Yeongjo	
Yi Ŭn	이은	李溵	1774	Yeongjo	
Yi Sagwan	이사관	李思觀	1774–1775	Yeongjo	
Hong Inhan	홍인한	洪麟漢	1775	Yeongjo	
Yi Sagwan	이사관	李思觀	1775–1776	Yeongjo	
Yi Ŭn	이은	李溵	1776	Yeongjo	
Sin Hoe	신회	申晦	1776	Yeongjo	
Kim Sangch'ŏl	김상철	金尙喆	1776	Jeongjo	
Chŏng Chongyŏm	정존겸	鄭存謙	1776	Jeongjo	
Kim Sangch'ŏl	김상철	金尙喆	1776–1777	Jeongjo	
Chŏng Chongyŏm	정존겸	鄭存謙	1777–1778	Jeongjo	
Sŏ Myŏngsŏn	서명선	徐命善	1778–1779	Jeongjo	
Hong Naksun	홍낙순	洪樂純	1779–1780	Jeongjo	
Yi Ŭn	이은	李溵	1780	Jeongjo	
Sŏ Myŏngsŏn	서명선	徐命善	1780–1781	Jeongjo	
Hong Naksun	홍낙순	洪樂純	1782	Jeongjo	
Yi Pokwŏn	이복원	李福源	1782–1783	Jeongjo	
Hong Naksun	홍낙순	洪樂純	1783	Jeongjo	
Yi Pokwŏn	이복원	李福源	1783–1784	Jeongjo	
Hong Naksun	홍낙순	洪樂純	1784–1786	Jeongjo	
Yi Pokwŏn	이복원	李福源	1786–1787	Jeongjo	
Yi Chaehyŏp	이재협	李在協	1787–1788	Jeongjo	
Yi Sŏngwŏn	이성원	李性源	1788–1789	Jeongjo	
Yi Chaehyŏp	이재협	李在協	1789	Jeongjo	
Ch'ae Chegong	채제공	蔡濟恭	1789–1793	Jeongjo	
Kim Chong-su	김종수	金鍾秀	1793	Jeongjo	
Kim I-so	김이소	金履素	1793–1795	Jeongjo	
Yu Ŏnho	유언호	兪彦鎬	1795	Jeongjo	
Ch'ae Chegong	채제공	蔡濟恭	1795–1798	Jeongjo	
Yi Pyŏng-mo	이병모	李秉模	1798–1799	Jeongjo	
Sim Hwan-ji	심환지	沈煥之	1799–1800	Jeongjo	
Yi Si-su	이시수	李時秀	1800–1802	Sunjo	
Sŏ Yongbo	서용보	徐龍輔	1803–1804	Sunjo	
Yi Si-su	이시수	李時秀	1804	Sunjo	
Sŏ Mae-su	서매수	徐邁修	1804–1805	Sunjo	
Yi Kyŏng-il	이경일	李敬一	1805	Sunjo	
Han Yong-gwi	한용귀	韓用龜	1805–1806	Sunjo	
Sŏ Yongbo	서용보	徐龍輔	1806	Sunjo	
Yi Si-su	이시수	李時秀	1806–1808	Sunjo	
Kim Chaech'an	김재찬	金載瓚	1808–1812	Sunjo	
Han Yong-gwi	한용귀	韓用龜	1812–1817	Sunjo	
Kim Chaech'an	김재찬	金載瓚	1817	Sunjo	
Kim Sa-mok	김사목	金思穆	1819	Sunjo	
Nam Kongch'ŏl	남공철	南公轍	1821–1822	Sunjo	
Yi Sang-hwang	이상황	李相璜	1824–1829	Sunjo	
Yi Chonsu	이존수	李存秀	1829	Sunjo	
Yi Sang-hwang	이상황	李相璜	1829–1833	Sunjo	
Sim Sang-gyu	심상규	沈象奎	1833–1834	Sunjo	
Hong Sŏk-ju	홍석주	洪奭周	1834–1836	Sunjo, Heonjong	
Pak Chonghun	박종훈	朴宗薰	1837–1838	Heonjong	
Kim Honggŭn	김홍근	金弘根	1838–1842	Heonjong	
Chŏng Wŏnyong	정원용	鄭元容	1842–1843	Heonjong	
Kwŏn Tonin	권돈인	權敦仁	1843–1845	Heonjong	
Kim Tohŭi	김도희	金道喜	1845–1850	Heonjong, Cheoljong	
Chŏng Wŏnyong	정원용	鄭元容	1850	Cheoljong	
Kim Hŭnggŭn	김흥근	金興根	1851	Cheoljong	
Pak Yŏngwŏn	박영원	朴永元	1852	Cheoljong	
Yi Hŏn-gu	이헌구	李憲球	1852–1853	Cheoljong	
Kim Tohŭi	김도희	金道喜	1856–1857	Cheoljong	
Cho Tusun	조두순	趙斗淳	1858	Cheoljong	
Pak Hoe-su	박회수	朴晦壽	1859–1860	Cheoljong	
Cho Tusun	조두순	趙斗淳	1860–1864	Cheoljong, Gojong	
Yi Yu-wŏn	이유원	李裕元	1864–1865	Gojong	
Kim Pyŏng-hak	김병학	金炳學	1865–1867	Gojong	
Yu Hu-jo	유후조	柳厚祚	1867	Gojong	
Yi Yu-wŏn	이유원	李裕元	1868	Gojong	
Kang Ro	강로	姜㳣	1872–1873	Gojong	
Yi Ch'oe-ŭng, Prince Hŭngin	흥인군 이최응	興寅君 李最應	1874–1875	Gojong	
Kim Pyŏng-guk	김병국	金炳國	1878–1882	Gojong	
Sŏ Tangbo	서당보	徐堂輔	1882	Gojong	
Song Kŭn-su	송근수	宋近洙	1882	Gojong	
Kim Pyŏng-guk	김병국	金炳國	1882–1884	Gojong	
Yi Chae-wŏn, Prince Wan-rim	완림군 이재원	完林君 李載元	1884	Gojong	
Sim Sunt'aek	심순택	沈舜澤	1884	Gojong	
Kim Hong-jip	김홍집	金弘集	1884	Gojong	
Kim Pyŏngdŏk	김병덕	金炳德	1885	Gojong	
Kim Pyŏngsi	김병시	金炳始	1886	Gojong	
Kim Hong-jip	김홍집	金弘集	1886	Gojong	
Kim Pyŏngsi	김병시	金炳始	1886	Gojong	
Kim Hong-jip	김홍집	金弘集	1887–1888	Gojong	
Kim Pyŏngsi	김병시	金炳始	1888	Gojong	
Song Kŭn-su	송근수	宋近洙	1892	Gojong	
Cho Pyŏng-se	조병세	趙秉世	1893–1894	Gojong	last Chwaŭijŏng
