= Yi Ki =

Korean philosopher (1476–1552)

Yi Ki 이기

Chief State Councillor
- In office June 16, 1549 – September 22, 1551
- Preceded by: Hong Ŏnp'il
- Succeeded by: Sim Yŏnwŏn

Left State Councillor
- In office November 13, 1545 – June 7, 1548
- Preceded by: Sŏng Sech'ang
- Succeeded by: Hong Ŏnp'il

Right State Councillor
- In office September 28, 1545 – November 13, 1545
- Preceded by: Sŏng Sech'ang
- Succeeded by: Chŏng Sunbung
- In office January 25, 1545 – January 30, 1545
- Preceded by: Yun Ingyŏng
- Succeeded by: Yu Kwan

Personal details
- Born: October 26, 1476
- Died: April 28, 1552 (aged 75)

Korean name
- Hangul: 이기
- Hanja: 李芑
- RR: I Gi
- MR: I Ki

Art name
- Hangul: 경재
- Hanja: 敬齋
- RR: Gyeongjae
- MR: Kyŏngjae

Courtesy name
- Hangul: 문중
- Hanja: 文仲
- RR: Munjung
- MR: Munjung

Yi Ki (Korean: 이기; Hanja: 李芑; October 26, 1476 – April 28, 1552) was a Korean scholar-official during the Joseon period. He was Chief State Councillor from 1549 to 1551. He was the nephew of Sŏng Tamsu (성담수), one of the members of Saengyuksin (생육신), and a relative of Yi I.

== Family ==
- Father - Yi Ŭimu (이의무; 李宜茂)
- Mother - Lady Sŏng of the Changnyeong Sŏng clan (창녕 성씨)
- Siblings
  - Older sister - Lady Yi of the Deoksu Yi clan (이씨)
  - Older brother - Yi Wi (이위; 李葦); died prematurely
  - Older brother - Yi Kwŏn (이권; 李菤)
  - Younger brother - Yi Haeng (이행; 李荇)
  - Younger brother - Yi Yŏng (이영; 李苓)
  - Younger brother - Yi Pong (이봉; 李芃)
- Wife and issue
  - Lady Kim (김씨); daughter of Kim Chin (김진; 金震)
    - Daughter - Lady Yi of the Deoksu Yi clan (이씨)
    - Son - Yi Wŏn'u (이원우; 李元祐)

== See also ==
- Yi I
- Yi Sun-sin
- Yun Wŏnhyŏng
