= Han Hwak =

Korean politician (1400–1456)

Han Hwak 한확

Left State Councilor
- In office 6 August 1455 – 10 October 1456
- Preceded by: Chŏng Inji
- Succeeded by: Yi Sa-cheol

Right State Councilor
- In office 15 November 1453 – 6 August 1455
- Preceded by: Jeong Bun
- Succeeded by: Yi Sa-cheol

Personal details
- Born: 1400
- Died: 1456 (aged 55–56)

Korean name
- Hangul: 한확
- Hanja: 韓確
- RR: Han Hwak
- MR: Han Hwak

Art name
- Hangul: 간이재
- Hanja: 簡易齋
- RR: Ganijae
- MR: Kanijae

Courtesy name
- Hangul: 자유
- Hanja: 子柔
- RR: Jayu
- MR: Chayu

Posthumous name
- Hangul: 양절
- Hanja: 襄節
- RR: Yangjeol
- MR: Yangjŏl

Han Hwak (Korean: 한확; Hanja: 韓確; 1400–1456), (Note: In lunar calendar, Han died on 11 September 1456.) nicknamed Ganyijae (간이재), was a politician and a diplomat during the Joseon period of Korea. He is mostly remembered thanks to his second daughter, Queen Insu, who married the eldest son of Grand Prince Suyang (son of Sejong the Great). Some years later, Suyang became King Sejo, the seventh monarch of Joseon; Queen Insu's husband died before acceding to throne, but she was raised to the position of queen when her son became King Seongjong.

== Family ==
- Father: Han Yeong-jeong (한영정; 1375–?)
- Mother: Lady, of the Uiseong Kim clan (의성 김씨; 1375–1423)
- Sibling(s)
  - Elder sister: Consort Kanghuizhuangshuli (강혜장숙여비; 1399–1424)
  - Younger brother: Han Jil (한질; 1406–?)
  - Younger brother: Han Jeon (한전; 1408–1447)
  - Younger sister: Madame Gongshen (공신부인; 1410–1484) (Note: Became a lesser known concubine of the Xuande Emperor.)
- Wife: Internal Princess Consort Namyang, of the Namyang Hong clan (남양부부인 홍씨; 1404–1450)
  - Son: Han Chi-in (한치인; 1421–1477)
  - Daughter: Lady Han (한씨; 1423–?)
  - Daughter: Princess Consort Jeongseon (정선군부인; 1426–1480) (Note: Married Prince Gyeyang, the son of King Sejong and Concubibe Shin.)
  - Daughter: Lady Han (한씨; 1427–?)
  - Daughter: Lady Han (한씨; 1431–?)
  - Daughter: Lady Han (한씨; 1434–1481)
  - Daughter: Queen Sohye (소혜왕후; 16 October 1437 – 21 May 1504)
  - Son: Han Chi-ui (한치의; 1440–1473)
  - Son: Han Chi-rye (한치례; 1441–1499)

== Ancestry ==
Ancestors of Han Hwak

Han Ak (한악)
Han Bang-sin (한방신)
Lady, of the Wonju Won clan (원주 원씨)
Han Yeong (한영)
Han Yeong-jeong (한영정)
Gwon Han-gong (권한공)
Gwon Jung-hwa (권중화)
Lady, of the Andong Gwon clan (안동 권씨)
Han Hwak
Kim Yeong-ryeol (김영렬)
Lady, of the Uiseong Kim clan (의성 김씨)

== In popular culture ==
- Portrayed by Jang Yong in the 2011–2012 JTBC TV series Insu, the Queen Mother.

== See also ==
- Sejo of Joseon
- Sejong the Great
- Crown Prince Uigyeong
