= Ch'oe Hang (Joseon civil minister) =

Korean politician (1409–1474)

Choe Hang 최항

Chief State Councillor
- In office 17 October 1467 – 7 January 1468
- Preceded by: Sim Hoe
- Succeeded by: Cho Sŏngmun

Left State Councillor
- In office 23 October 1471 – 14 May 1474
- Preceded by: Kim Kukgwang
- Succeeded by: Han Myŏnghoe
- In office 21 June 1467 – 17 October 1467
- Preceded by: Sim Hoe
- Succeeded by: Cho Sŏngmun

Right State Councillor
- In office 9 May 1467 – 21 June 1467
- Preceded by: Hwang Susin
- Succeeded by: Hong Yunsŏng

Personal details
- Born: 1409
- Died: May 14, 1474 (aged 64–65)
- Spouse: Lady Sŏ of the Dalseong Sŏ clan
- Children: Ch'oe Yŏngnin (1st son); Ch'oe Yŏngho (2nd son)
- Parents: Ch'oe Sayu (father); Lady O of the Haeju O clan (mother)
- Relatives: Sŏ Misŏng (father-in-law)

Korean name
- Hangul: 최항
- Hanja: 崔恒
- RR: Choe Hang
- MR: Ch'oe Hang

Art name
- Hangul: 태허정, 동량
- Hanja: 太虛亭, 㠉梁
- RR: Taeheojeong, Dongryang
- MR: T'aehŏjŏng, Tongnyang

Courtesy name
- Hangul: 정보
- Hanja: 貞父
- RR: Jeongbo
- MR: Chŏngbo

Posthumous name
- Hangul: 문충, 문정
- Hanja: 文忠, 文靖
- RR: Munchung, Munjeong
- MR: Munch'ung, Munjŏng

Ch'oe Hang (Korean: 최항; Hanja: 崔恒; 1409–1474) was a prominent civil minister (called munsin) and scholar who came from the Sangnyeong Ch'oe clan during the Joseon period.

In 1434, the 16th year of Sejong the Great's reign, as he passed kwagŏ or civil minister exam, with the highest point, he was appointed as the junior sixth counselor (부수찬; 副修撰; pusuch'an) at the Hall of Worthies (Chiphyŏnjŏn). He participated in helping the king create hangul, Korean alphabet. He also was devoted to compiling Tongguk t'onggam and Kyŏngguk taejŏn (State Code).

== Family ==
- Father: Ch'oe Sayu (최사유; 崔士柔)
- Mother: Lady O of the Haeju O clan (증 정경부인 해주 오씨; 贈 貞敬夫人 海州 吳氏)
- Wife: Lady Sŏ of the Dalseong Sŏ clan (정경부인 달성 서씨; 貞敬夫人 達城 徐氏)
  - 1st son: Ch'oe Yŏngnin (최영린; 崔永潾)
  - 2nd son: Ch'oe Yŏngho (최영호; 崔永灝; 1457–1481)

== See also ==
- Hall of Worthies
