= Hong Talson =

Joseon politician (1420–1472)

Hong Talson 홍달손

Left State Councillor
- In office 7 January 1468 – 12 April 1468
- Preceded by: Cho Sŏngmun
- Succeeded by: Pak Wŏnhyŏng

Personal details
- Born: 1415 Hwaseong, Gyeonggi Province, Joseon
- Died: 1472 (aged 56–57)

Korean name
- Hangul: 홍달손
- Hanja: 洪達孫
- RR: Hong Dalson
- MR: Hong Talson

Courtesy name
- Hangul: 가칙
- Hanja: 可則
- RR: Gachik
- MR: Kach'ik

Posthumous name
- Hangul: 안무
- Hanja: 安武
- RR: Anmu
- MR: Anmu

Hong Talson (Korean: 홍달손; Hanja: 洪達孫, 1415 – 25 November 1472) was a politician and soldier of the Joseon period of Korea. His courtesy name was Kach'ik (가칙; 可則). He was part of the plots which instated King Sejo on his throne (계유정난). As a result, he was nominated as the #10 in the 1st rank merit subject of 1453 and the #10 in the 2nd rank merit subject of 1455, with the title Prince Namyang (남양군).

In 1459, he was promoted to Internal Prince Namyang 남양부원군 南陽府院君. Under Sejo, Yejong and Seongjong, he occupied many governmental posts, Left State Councilor (좌위정) among them (1467–1472).

Hong came from the Namyang Hong clan of the Dang lineage (남양 홍씨 당홍계).

== Family ==
- Father - Hong Ch'i (홍치; 洪治; 1395–?)
- Mother - Lady Yi of the Gongju Yi clan (공주 이씨; 1410–?)

Sibling(s)

- Older sister - Lady Hong of the Namyang Hong clan (남양 홍씨; 1417–?)
- Younger sister - Lady Hong of the Namyang Hong clan (남양 홍씨; 1427–?)
- Younger brother - Hong Kwison (홍귀손; 洪貴孫; 1430–?)
- Younger sister - Lady Hong of the Namyang Hong clan (남양 홍씨; 1432–?)
- Younger sister - Lady Hong of the Namyang Hong clan (남양 홍씨; 1434–?)
- Younger brother - Hong Sunson (홍순손; 洪順孫; 1440–?)
- Wife and children
  - Lady An (안씨; 安氏; 1422 – 28 March 1477); married in 1444
    - Son - Hong Pyŏn (홍변; 1451–?)
    - Son - Hong Hŭn (홍흔; 洪忻; 1452–?)
    - Daughter - Lady Hong of the Namyang Hong clan (남양 홍씨; 1453–?)
    - Son - Hong Kwan (홍관; 洪慣; 1456–?)
