= Uŭijŏng =

Government position of Joseon

- Hangul: 우의정; 우상; 우정승; 우규; 우합; 우대
- Hanja: 右議政; 右相; 右政丞; 右揆; 右閤; 右臺
- RR: uuijeong; usang; ujeongseung; ugyu; uhap; udae
- MR: uŭijŏng; usang; ujŏngsŭng; ugyu; uhap; udae

Uŭijŏng (Korean: 우의정; Hanja: 右議政), also known as the Right State Councilor, was the Third State Councillor of the Uijeongbu (State Council) during the Joseon period of Korea (1392–1897). The Uŭijŏng was variously referred to as Usang, Ujŏngsŭng, Ugyu, Uhap, or Udae.

Uŭijŏng was the lowest of the three prime ministers, ranked senior first (jeong-il-pum; 정1품; 正一品), roughly equal to the Second Deputy Prime Minister in modern day.

The position was created in 1400 by Taejong, replacing the former position Munha Usijung (문하우시중; 門下右侍中) during Goryeo period. Its name was changed to Uŭijŏngbusa (우의정부사; 右議政府事) in 1418, then to Ŭijŏngbu Uŭijŏng (의정부우의정; 議政府右議政) in 1455.

During the Joseon dynasty, Uŭijŏng was also granted posthumously as an honorable position to fathers-in-law of Grand Internal Princes (대원군; 大院君), Grand Princes (대군; 大君), or Crown Princes' sons (세손; 世孫).

The position was abolished in 1894.

== List of the Uŭijŏng ==
Name			In office	Kings	Notes
Name in English	Name in Hangul	Name in Hanja	In office	Kings	Notes
Jo Jun	조준	趙浚	1392	Taejo	as Munha Usijung (문하우시중)
Kim Sa-hyeong	김사형	金士衡	1392–1399	Taejo	as Munha Ujeongseung (문하우정승)
Seong Seok-rin	성석린	成石璘	1399–1400	Jeongjong	as Munha Ujeongseung
Min Je	민제	閔霽	1399–1400	Jeongjong	as Munha Ujeongseung
Ha Ryun	하륜	河崙	1400–1401	Jeongjong	as Munha Ujeongseung
Yi Seo	이서	李舒	1401	Taejong	as Ujeongseung
Yi Mu	이무	李茂	1401–1403	Taejong	as Ujeongseung
Seong Seok-rin	성석린	成石璘	1403–1404	Taejong	as Ujeongseung
Yi Seo	이서	李舒	1404–1405	Taejong	as Ujeongseung
Cho Yeong-mu	조영무	趙英茂	1405–1407	Taejong	as Ujeongseung
Yi Mu	이무	李茂	1407–1409	Taejong	as Ujeongseung
Yi Seo	이서	李舒	1409	Taejong	as Ujeongseung
Cho Yeong-mu	조영무	趙英茂	1409–1413	Taejong	as Ujeongseung
Nam Jae	남재	南在	1413–1414	Taejong	as Ujeongseung
Yi Jik	이직	李稷	1414–1415	Taejong	
Ryu Ryang	류량	柳亮	1415	Taejong	
Nam Jae	남재	南在	1415–1416	Taejong	
Park Eun	박은	朴訔	1416	Taejong	
Han Sang-gyeong	한상경	韓尙敬	1416–1418	Taejong	
Yi Won	이원	李原	1418–1421	Taejong	
Jeong Tak	정탁	鄭擢	1421–1423	Sejong	
Ryu Gwan	류관	柳寬	1424–1426	Sejong	
Cho Yeon	조연	趙涓	1426	Sejong	
Hwang Hŭi	황희	黃喜	1426–1427	Sejong	
Maeng Sa-seong	맹사성	孟思誠	1427–1431	Sejong	
Gwon Jin	권진	權軫	1431–1433	Sejong	
Ch'oe Yundŏk	최윤덕	崔閏德	1433–1435	Sejong	
No Han	노한	盧閈	1435–1438	Sejong	
Heo Jo	허조	許稠	1438–1439	Sejong	
Sin Gae	신개	申槩	1439–1445	Sejong	
Ha Yeon	하연	河演	1445–1447	Sejong	
Hwangbo In	황보인	皇甫仁	1447–1449	Sejong	
Nam Ji	남지	南智	1449–1451	Sejong	
Kim Chongsŏ	김종서	金宗瑞	1451–1452	Munjong	
Jeong Bun	정분	鄭苯	1452–1453	Danjong	
Han Hwak	한확	韓確	1453–1455	Danjong	
Yi Sa-cheol	이사철	李思哲	1455–1456	Sejo	
Jeong Chang-son	정창손	鄭昌孫	1456–1457	Sejo	
Gang Maeng-gyeong	강맹경	姜孟卿	1457–1458	Sejo	
Sin Sukchu	신숙주	申叔舟	1458–1459	Sejo	
Kwŏn Ram	권람	權擥	1459	Sejo	
Yi In-son	이인손	李仁孫	1459	Sejo	
Kwŏn Ram	권람	權擥	1459–1462	Sejo	
Han Myŏnghoe	한명회	韓明澮	1462–1463	Sejo	
Gu Ji-gwan	구치관	具致寬	1463–1464	Sejo	
Hwang Su-sin	황수신	黃守身	1464–1466	Sejo	
Park Won-hyeong	박원형	朴元亨	1466	Sejo	
Hwang Su-sin	황수신	黃守身	1466–1467	Sejo	
Ch'oe Hang	최항	崔恒	1467	Sejo	
Hong Yunsŏng	홍윤성	洪允成	1467	Sejo	
Gang Sun	강순	康純	1467–1468	Sejo	
Kim Chil	김질	金礩	1468	Sejo	
Yun Sa-bun	윤사분	尹士昐	1468–1469	Yejong	
Yun Ja-un	윤자운	尹子雲	1469	Yejong	
Kim Guk-gwang	김국광	金國光	1469–1470	Yejong	
Han Baek-ryun	한백륜	韓伯倫	1470–1471	Seongjong	
Seong Bong-jo	성봉조	成奉祖	1471–1474	Seongjong	
Kim Chil	김질	金礩	1474–1475	Seongjong	
Yun Sa-heun	윤사흔	尹士昕	1475–1476	Seongjong	
Yun Ja-un	윤자운	尹子雲	1476–1478	Seongjong	
Kim Guk-gwang	김국광	金國光	1478	Seongjong	
Yun Pil-sang	윤필상	尹弼商	1478–1479	Seongjong	
Hong Eung	홍응	洪應	1479–1485	Seongjong	
Yi Geuk-bae	이극배	李克培	1485	Seongjong	
No Sa-sin	노사신	盧思愼	1485–1492	Seongjong	
Heo Jong	허종	許琮	1492–1493	Seongjong	
Yun Ho	윤호	尹壕	1493–1494	Seongjong	
Shin Seung-seon	신승선	愼承善	1494–1495	Seongjong	
Jeong Gwal	정괄	鄭佸	1495	Yeonsangun	
Eo Se-gyeom	어세겸	魚世謙	1495–1496	Yeonsangun	
Jeong Mun-hyeong	정문형	鄭文炯	1496	Yeonsangun	
Han Chi-hyeong	한치형	韓致亨	1496–1498	Yeonsangun	
Seong Jun	성준	成俊	1498–1500	Yeonsangun	
Yi Geuk-gyun	이극균	李克均	1500–1503	Yeonsangun	
Ryu Sun	류순	柳洵	1503–1504	Yeonsangun	
Heo Chim	허침	許琛	1504	Yeonsangun	
Park Sung-jil	박숭질	朴崇質	1504–1505	Yeonsangun	
Gang Gwi-son	강귀손	姜龜孫	1505	Yeonsangun	
Shin Su-geun	신수근	愼守勤	1505–1506	Yeonsangun	
Kim Su-dong	김수동	金壽童	1506	Yeonsangun, Jungjong	
Park Won-jong	박원종	朴元宗	1506	Jungjong	
Yu Sunjŏng	유순정	柳順汀	1506–1509	Jungjong	
Sŏng Hŭian	성희안	成希顔	1509–1512	Jungjong	
Song Jil	송질	宋軼	1512–1513	Jungjong	
Jeong Gwang-pil	정광필	鄭光弼	1513	Jungjong	
Kim Eung-gi	김응기	金應箕	1513–1516	Jungjong	
Shin Yong-gae	신용개	申用漑	1516–1518	Jungjong	
An Dang	안당	安瑭	1518–1519	Jungjong	
Kim Jeong	김전	金詮	1519	Jungjong	
Yi Yu-cheong	이유청	李惟淸	1519–1523	Jungjong	
Gwon Gyun	권균	權鈞	1523–1526	Jungjong	
Yi Hang	이항	李沆	1527	Jungjong	
Sim Jeong	심정	沈貞	1527	Jungjong	
Yi Hang	이항	李沆	1527–1530	Jungjong	
Jang Sun-son	장순손	張順孫	1531	Jungjong	
Han Hyo-won	한효원	韓效元	1531–1533	Jungjong	
Kim Geun-sa	김근사	金謹思	1533–1534	Jungjong	
Yun Eun-bo	윤은보	尹殷輔	1534–1537	Jungjong	
Ryu Bu	류부	柳溥	1537	Jungjong	
Hong Eon-pil	홍언필	洪彦弼	1537	Jungjong	
Kim Geuk-seong	김극성	金克成	1537–1540	Jungjong	
Yun In-gyeong	윤인경	尹仁鏡	1540–1545	Jungjong, Injong	
Yi Ki	이기	李芑	1545	Injong	
Ryu Gwan	류관	柳灌	1545	Injong	
Seong Se-chang	성세창	成世昌	1545	Injong, Myeongjong	
Yi Ki	이기	李芑	1545	Myeongjong	
Jeong Sun-bung	정순붕	鄭順朋	1545–1548	Myeongjong	
Hwang Heon	황헌	黃憲	1548	Myeongjong	
Sim Yeon-won	심연원	沈連源	1548–1549	Myeongjong	
Sang Jin	상진	尙震	1549–1551	Myeongjong	
Yun Wŏnhyŏng	윤원형	尹元衡	1551	Myeongjong	
Yun Gae	윤개	尹漑	1551–1558	Myeongjong	
Yun Wŏnhyŏng	윤원형	尹元衡	1558	Myeongjong	
An Hyeon	안현	安玹	1558	Myeongjong	
Yi Jun-gyeong	이준경	李浚慶	1558–1560	Myeongjong	
Sim Tong-won	심통원	沈通源	1560–1564	Myeongjong	
Yi Myeong	이명	李蓂	1564–1566	Myeongjong	
Gwon Cheol	권철	權轍	1566–1567	Myeongjong, Seonjo	
Min Gi	민기	閔箕	1567–1568	Seonjo	
Hong Seom	홍섬	洪暹	1567–1571	Seonjo	
O Gyeom	오겸	吳謙	1571	Seonjo	Refuse to assume office
Yi Tak	이탁	李鐸	1571–1572	Seonjo	
Jeon Dae-nyeon	정대년	鄭大年	1572	Seonjo	Refuse to assume office
Park Sun	박순	朴淳	1572–1573	Seonjo	
No Su-sin	노수신	盧守愼	1573–1578	Seonjo	
Gang Sa-sang	강사상	姜士尙	1578–1581	Seonjo	
Jeong Yu-gil	정유길	鄭惟吉	1581	Seonjo	
Kim Kwiyŏng	김귀영	金貴榮	1581	Seonjo	
Jeong Ji-yeon	정지연	鄭芝衍	1581–1583	Seonjo	
Jeong Yu-gil	정유길	鄭惟吉	1583	Seonjo	
No Su-sin	노수신	盧守愼	1583–1585	Seonjo	
Ryu Jeon	류전	柳琠	1585–1588	Seonjo	
Yi San-hae	이산해	李山海	1588–1589	Seonjo	
Chŏng Ŏnsin	정언신	鄭彦信	1589	Seonjo	
Chŏng Ch'ŏl	정철	鄭澈	1589	Seonjo	
Sim Sugyŏng	심수경	沈守慶	1589–1590	Seonjo	
Yu Sŏngnyong	유성룡	柳成龍	1590–1591	Seonjo	
Yi Yang-won	이양원	李陽元	1591–1592	Seonjo	
Yun Tusu	윤두수	尹斗壽	1592	Seonjo	
Yu Hong	유홍	兪泓	1592–1594	Seonjo	
Kim Eung-nam	김응남	金應南	1594–1595	Seonjo	
Jeong Tak	정탁	鄭琢	1595	Seonjo	
Yi Won-ik	이원익	李元翼	1595–1598	Seonjo	
Yi Deok-hyeong	이덕형	李德馨	1598	Seonjo	
Yi Hangbok	이항복	李恒福	1598–1599	Seonjo	
Yi Heon-guk	이헌국	李憲國	1599–1600	Seonjo	
Kim Myŏngwŏn	김명원	金命元	1600–1601	Seonjo	
Yun Seung-hun	윤승훈	尹承勳	1601–1602	Seonjo	
Ryu Yeong-gyeong	류영경	柳永慶	1602–1604	Seonjo	
Gi Ja-heon	기자헌	奇自獻	1604	Seonjo	
Sim Hui-su	심희수	沈喜壽	1604–1606	Seonjo	
Heo Uk	허욱	許頊	1606	Seonjo	
Han Eung-in	한응인	韓應寅	1606–1608	Seonjo, Gwanghaegun	
Sim Hui-su	심희수	沈喜壽	1608–1611	Gwanghaegun	
Yi Hangbok	이항복	李恒福	1611–1612	Gwanghaegun	
Chŏng Inhong	정인홍	鄭仁弘	1612–1614	Gwanghaegun	
Chŏng Ch'angyŏn	정창연	鄭昌衍	1614–1616	Gwanghaegun	
Han Hyo-sun	한효순	韓孝純	1616–1618	Gwanghaegun	
Min Mong-ryong	민몽룡	閔夢龍	1618	Gwanghaegun	
Park Seung-jong	박승종	朴承宗	1618	Gwanghaegun	
Park Hong-gu	박홍구	朴弘耉	1618–1619	Gwanghaegun	
Jo Jeong	조정	趙挺	1619–1623	Gwanghaegun, Injo	
Yun Bang	윤방	尹昉	1623	Injo	
Shin Heum	신흠	申欽	1623–1626	Injo	
O Yun-gyeom	오윤겸	吳允謙	1626–1627	Injo	
Kim Ryu	김류	金瑬	1627–1628	Injo	
Yi Jeong-gu	이정구	李廷龜	1628–1632	Injo	
Kim Sang-yong	김상용	金尙容	1632–1633	Injo	
Kim Ryu	김류	金瑬	1633–1634	Injo	
Kim Sang-yong	김상용	金尙容	1634–1635	Injo	
Hong Seo-bong	홍서봉	洪瑞鳳	1636	Injo	
Yi Hong-ju	이홍주	李弘冑	1636–1637	Injo	
Yi Seong-gu	이성구	李聖求	1637	Injo	
Choe Myeong-gil	최명길	崔鳴吉	1637	Injo	
Jang Yu	장유	張維	1637	Injo	
Shin Gyeong-jin	신경진	申景禛	1637–1638	Injo	
Sin Yeol	심열	沈悅	1638–1640	Injo	
Gang Seok-gi	강석기	姜碩期	1641–1642	Injo	
Sin Gi-won	심기원	沈器遠	1642–1643	Injo	
Kim Chajŏm	김자점	金自點	1643	Injo	
Yi Gyeong-ye	이경여	李敬輿	1643–1644	Injo	
Sin Yeol	심열	沈悅	1644	Injo	
Seo Gyeong-u	서경우	徐景雨	1644–1645	Injo	
Sin Yeol	심열	沈悅	1645	Injo	
Yi Gyeong-seok	이경석	李景奭	1645–1646	Injo	
Nam Yi-ung	남이웅	南以雄	1646–1647	Injo	
Yi Haeng-won	이행원	李行遠	1647–1648	Injo	
Nam Yi-ung	남이웅	南以雄	1648	Injo	
Jeong Tae-hwa	정태화	鄭太和	1649	Injo, Hyojong	
Jo Ik	조익	趙翼	1649	Hyojong	
Kim Yuk	김육	金堉	1649–1650	Hyojong	
Jo Ik	조익	趙翼	1650	Hyojong	
Yi Si-baek	이시백	李時白	1650–1651	Hyojong	
Han Heung-il	한흥일	韓興一	1651	Hyojong	
Yi Si-baek	이시백	李時白	1651–1653	Hyojong	
Gu In-hu	구인후	具仁垕	1653–1654	Hyojong	
Sim Ji-won	심지원	沈之源	1654–1656	Hyojong	
Won Doo-pyo	원두표	元斗杓	1656–1657	Hyojong	
Yi Hu-won	이후원	李厚源	1657–1659	Hyojong	
Won Doo-pyo	원두표	元斗杓	1659	Hyojong	
Jeong Yu-seong	정유성	鄭維城	1659–1660	Hyeonjong	
Won Doo-pyo	원두표	元斗杓	1660–1662	Hyeonjong	
Jeong Yu-seong	정유성	鄭維城	1662–1663	Hyeonjong	
Hong Myeong-ha	홍명하	洪命夏	1663–1664	Hyeonjong	
Heo Jeok	허적	許積	1664–1667	Hyeonjong	
Jeong Chi-hwa	정치화	鄭致和	1667–1668	Hyeonjong	
Song Si-yeol	송시열	宋時烈	1668	Hyeonjong	
Hong Jung-bo	홍중보	洪重普	1669–1671	Hyeonjong	
Song Si-yeol	송시열	宋時烈	1671–1672	Hyeonjong	
Kim Su-hang	김수항	金壽恒	1672	Hyeonjong	
Yi Gyeong-eok	이경억	李慶億	1672–1673	Hyeonjong	
Kim Su-heung	김수흥	金壽興	1673–1674	Hyeonjong	
Yi Wan	이완	李浣	1674	Hyeonjong	
Jeong Ji-hwa	정지화	鄭知和	1674	Hyeonjong, Sukjong	
Kim Su-hang	김수항	金壽恒	1674–1675	Sukjong	
Kwŏn Taeun	권대운	權大運	1675	Sukjong	
Hŏ Mok	허목	許穆	1675–1678	Sukjong	
Min Hŭi	민희	閔熙	1678–1679	Sukjong	
O Si-su	오시수	吳始壽	1679–1680	Sukjong	
Min Jeong-jung	민정중	閔鼎重	1680	Sukjong	
Yi Sang-jin	이상진	李尙眞	1680–1682	Sukjong	
Kim Seok-ju	김석주	金錫冑	1682–1684	Sukjong	
Nam Gu-man	남구만	南九萬	1684–1685	Sukjong	
Jeong Jae-sung	정재숭	鄭載嵩	1685–1686	Sukjong	
Yi Dang-ha	이단하	李端夏	1686–1687	Sukjong	
Jo Sa-seok	조사석	趙師錫	1687	Sukjong	
Yi Suk	이숙	李䎘	1687–1688	Sukjong	
Ye Seong-je	여성제	呂聖齊	1688–1689	Sukjong	
Mok Nae-seon	목내선	睦來善	1689	Sukjong	
Kim Deok-won	김덕원	金德遠	1689–1691	Sukjong	
Min Am	민암	閔黯	1691–1694	Sukjong	
Yun Ji-wan	윤지완	尹趾完	1694	Sukjong	
Ryu Sang-un	류상운	柳尙運	1695	Sukjong	
Shin Ik-sang	신익상	申翼相	1695	Sukjong	
Yun Ji-seon	윤지선	尹趾善	1696	Sukjong	
Seo Mun-jung	서문중	徐文重	1696	Sukjong	
Choi Seok-jeong	최석정	崔錫鼎	1697–1698	Sukjong	
Yi Se-baek	이세백	李世白	1698–1700	Sukjong	
Min Jin-jang	민진장	閔鎭長	1700	Sukjong	
Shin Wan	신완	申琓	1700–1703	Sukjong	
Kim Gu	김구	金構	1703–1704	Sukjong	
Yi Yu	이유	李濡	1704–1705	Sukjong	
Seo Jong-tae	서종태	徐宗泰	1705–1706	Sukjong	
Kim Chang-jip	김창집	金昌集	1706	Sukjong	
Yi Yi-myeong	이이명	李頣命	1706–1707	Sukjong	
Seo Jong-tae	서종태	徐宗泰	1707–1708	Sukjong	
Yun Jeung	윤증	尹拯	1709–1710	Sukjong	
Kim Chang-jip	김창집	金昌集	1710–1711	Sukjong	
Jo Sang-u	조상우	趙相愚	1711–1712	Sukjong	
Kim Chang-jip	김창집	金昌集	1712	Sukjong	
Kim U-hang	김우항	金宇杭	1713–1716	Sukjong	
Yi Yi-myeong	이이명	李頣命	1716–1717	Sukjong	
Gwon Sang-ha	권상하	權尙夏	1717	Sukjong	
Jo Tae-chae	조태채	趙泰采	1717–1718	Sukjong	
Yi Geon-myeong	이건명	李健命	1718–1720	Sukjong	
Jo Tae-gu	조태구	趙泰耉	1720–1721	Gyeongjong	
Choe Seok-hang	최석항	崔錫恒	1721–1723	Gyeongjong	
Yi Gwang-jwa	이광좌	李光佐	1723–1724	Gyeongjong, Yeongjo	
Ryu Bong-hwi	류봉휘	柳鳳輝	1724	Yeongjo	
Jo Tae-eok	조태억	趙泰億	1724–1725	Yeongjo	
Jeong Ho	정호	鄭澔	1725	Yeongjo	
Min Jin-won	민진원	閔鎭遠	1725	Yeongjo	
Yi Gwan-myeong	이관명	李觀命	1725–1726	Yeongjo	
Hong Chi-jung	홍치중	洪致中	1726	Yeongjo	
Jo Doo-bin	조도빈	趙道彬	1726–1727	Yeongjo	
Yi Ui-hyeon	이의현	李宜顯	1727	Yeongjo	
Hong Chi-jung	홍치중	洪致中	1727	Yeongjo	
Sim Su-hyeon	심수현	沈壽賢	1727–1728	Yeongjo	
O Myeong-hang	오명항	吳命恒	1728	Yeongjo	
Yi Tae-jwa	이태좌	李台佐	1728–1729	Yeongjo	
Yi Jip	이집	李㙫	1729–1730	Yeongjo	
Jo Mun-myeong	조문명	趙文命	1730–1732	Yeongjo	
Seo Myeong-gyun	서명균	徐命均	1732	Yeongjo	
Kim Heung-gyeong	김흥경	金興慶	1732–1735	Yeongjo	
Kim Jae-ro	김재로	金在魯	1735	Yeongjo	
Song In-myeong	송인명	宋寅明	1735–1739	Yeongjo	
Yu Cheok-gi	유척기	兪拓基	1739–1740	Yeongjo	
Jo Hyeon-myeong	조현명	趙顯命	1740–1746	Yeongjo	
Jeong Seok-o	정석오	鄭錫五	1746	Yeongjo	
Min Eung-su	민응수	閔應洙	1746–1749	Yeongjo	
Kim Yak-ro	김약로	金若魯	1749	Yeongjo	
Jeong U-ryang	정우량	鄭羽良	1749–1752	Yeongjo	
Yi Cheon-bo	이천보	李天輔	1752	Yeongjo	
Kim Sang-ro	김상로	金尙魯	1752–1753	Yeongjo	
Jo Jae-ho	조재호	趙載浩	1754–1756	Yeongjo	
Shin Man	신만	申晩	1756–1758	Yeongjo	
Yi Hu	이후	李𪻶	1758–1759	Yeongjo	
Shin Man	신만	申晩	1759	Yeongjo	
Yi Hu	이후	李𪻶	1759	Yeongjo	
Min Baek-sang	민백상	閔百祥	1759–1761	Yeongjo	
Hong Bong-han	홍봉한	洪鳳漢	1761	Yeongjo	
Jeong Hwi-ryang	정휘량	鄭翬良	1761	Yeongjo	
Yun Dong-do	윤동도	尹東度	1761–1763	Yeongjo	
Kim Sang-bok	김상복	金相福	1763–1765	Yeongjo	
Kim Chi-in	김치인	金致仁	1765–1766	Yeongjo	
Seo Ji-su	서지수	徐志修	1766	Yeongjo	
Kim Chi-in	김치인	金致仁	1766	Yeongjo	
Kim Yang-taek	김양택	金陽澤	1766	Yeongjo	
Kim Sang-cheol	김상철	金尙喆	1766–1768	Yeongjo	
Han Ik-mo	한익모	韓翼謩	1768	Yeongjo	
Yi Chang-ui	이창의	李昌誼	1768	Yeongjo	
Kim Sang-cheol	김상철	金尙喆	1768–1772	Yeongjo	
Han Ik-mo	한익모	韓翼謩	1772	Yeongjo	
Kim Sang-cheol	김상철	金尙喆	1772	Yeongjo	
Yi Chang-ui	이창의	李昌誼	1772	Yeongjo	
Yi Eun	이은	李溵	1772	Yeongjo	
Han Ik-mo	한익모	韓翼謩	1772	Yeongjo	
Yi Eun	이은	李溵	1772	Yeongjo	
Sin Hoe	신회	申晦	1772	Yeongjo	
Yi Eun	이은	李溵	1772	Yeongjo	
Yi Sa-gwan	이사관	李思觀	1772	Yeongjo	
Won In-son	원인손	元仁孫	1772	Yeongjo	
Yi Sa-gwan	이사관	李思觀	1772	Yeongjo	
Won In-son	원인손	元仁孫	1772	Yeongjo	
Yi Eun	이은	李溵	1772	Yeongjo	
Yi Sa-gwan	이사관	李思觀	1772–1773	Yeongjo	
Won In-son	원인손	元仁孫	1773	Yeongjo	
Yi Sa-gwan	이사관	李思觀	1773	Yeongjo	
Won In-son	원인손	元仁孫	1773	Yeongjo	
Yi Eun	이은	李溵	1773–1774	Yeongjo	
Won In-son	원인손	元仁孫	1774	Yeongjo	
Yi Sa-gwan	이사관	李思觀	1774	Yeongjo	
Hong In-han	홍인한	洪麟漢	1774–1775	Yeongjo	
Yi Sa-gwan	이사관	李思觀	1776	Yeongjo	
Yi Eun	이은	李溵	1776	Yeongjo, Jeongjo	
Jeong Jon-gyeom	정존겸	鄭存謙	1776–1777	Jeongjo	
Seo Myeong-seon	서명선	徐命善	1777–1778	Jeongjo	
Jeong Hong-sun	정홍순	鄭弘淳	1777–1778	Jeongjo	
Hong Nak-sun	홍낙순	洪樂純	1779	Jeongjo	
Yi Hwi-ji	이휘지	李徽之	1778–1782	Jeongjo	
Yi Bok-won	이복원	李福源	1782	Jeongjo	
Kim Ik	김익	金熤	1782–1783	Jeongjo	
Yi Bok-won	이복원	李福源	1783	Jeongjo	
Kim Ik	김익	金熤	1784–1787	Jeongjo	
Jo Gyeong	조경	趙璥	1787	Jeongjo	
Yu Eon-ho	유언호	兪彦鎬	1787–1788	Jeongjo	
Yi Seong-won	이성원	李性源	1788	Jeongjo	
Ch'ae Chegong	채제공	蔡濟恭	1788–1789	Jeongjo	
Kim Jong-su	김종수	金鍾秀	1789–1792	Jeongjo	
Park Jong-ak	박종악	朴宗岳	1792	Jeongjo	
Kim I-so	김이소	金履素	1792–1793	Jeongjo	
Kim Hui	김희	金憙	1793–1794	Jeongjo	
Yi Byeong-mo	이병모	李秉模	1794–1795	Jeongjo	
Ch'ae Chegong	채제공	蔡濟恭	1795	Jeongjo	
Yun Si-dong	윤시동	尹蓍東	1795–1797	Jeongjo	
Yi Byeong-mo	이병모	李秉模	1797–1798	Jeongjo	
Sim Hwan-ji	심환지	沈煥之	1798–1799	Jeongjo	
Yi Si-su	이시수	李時秀	1799–1800	Jeongjo	
Seo Ryong-bo	서룡보	徐龍輔	1800–1802	Jeongjo, Sunjo	
Kim Gwan-ju	김관주	金觀柱	1802–1804	Sunjo	
Yi Gyeong-il	이경일	李敬一	1804–1805	Sunjo	
Kim Jae-chan	김재찬	金載瓚	1805	Sunjo	
Kim Dal-sun	김달순	金達淳	1805–1806	Sunjo	
Seo Ryong-bo	서룡보	徐龍輔	1806–1807	Sunjo	
Kim Jae-chan	김재찬	金載瓚	1807–1808	Sunjo	
Kim Sa-mok	김사목	金思穆	1808–1817	Sunjo	
Nam-gong-cheol	남공철	南公轍	1817–1821	Sunjo	
Im Han-ho	임한호	林漢浩	1821–1823	Sunjo	
Yi Seo-gu	이서구	李書九	1824–1825	Sunjo	
Sim Sang-gyu	심상규	沈象奎	1825–1827	Sunjo	
Yi Jon-su	이존수	李存秀	1827–1828	Sunjo	
Jeong Man-seok	정만석	鄭晩錫	1829–1830	Sunjo	
Kim I-gyo	김이교	金履喬	1831–1832	Sunjo	
Sim Sang-gyu	심상규	沈象奎	1833	Sunjo	
Park Jong-hun	박종훈	朴宗薰	1834–1837	Sunjo, Heonjong	
Yi Ji-yeon	이지연	李止淵	1837–1839	Heonjong	
Jo In-yeong	조인영	趙寅永	1839–1841	Heonjong	
Jeong Won-yong	정원용	鄭元容	1841–1842	Heonjong	
Gwon Don-in	권돈인	權敦仁	1842–1843	Heonjong	
Kim Do-hui	김도희	金道喜	1843–1845	Heonjong	
Park Hoe-su	박회수	朴晦壽	1845–1850	Heonjong, Cheoljong	
Gwon Don-in	권돈인	權敦仁	1850–1851	Cheoljong	
Park Yeong-won	박영원	朴永元	1851–1852	Cheoljong	
Yi Heon-gu	이헌구	李憲球	1852	Cheoljong	
Kim Jwa-geun	김좌근	金左根	1852	Cheoljong	
Jo Du-sun	조두순	趙斗淳	1852–1855	Cheoljong	
Park Hoe-su	박회수	朴晦壽	1855–1857	Cheoljong	
Jo Du-sun	조두순	趙斗淳	1857–1858	Cheoljong	
Park Hoe-su	박회수	朴晦壽	1859–1860	Cheoljong	
Jo Du-sun	조두순	趙斗淳	1860–1864	Cheoljong	
Yi Gyeong-jae	이경재	李景在	1864	Gojong	
Im Baek-gyeong	임백경	任百經	1864–1865	Gojong	
Ryu Hu-jo	류후조	柳厚祚	1866–1867	Gojong	
Hong Sun-mok	홍순목	洪淳穆	1869–1872	Gojong	
Han Gye-won	한계원	韓啓源	1872–1873	Gojong	
Park Gyu-su	박규수	朴珪壽	1873–1874	Gojong	
Kim Byeong-guk	김병국	金炳國	1874–1878	Gojong	
Min Gyu-ho	민규호	閔奎鎬	1878	Gojong	
Seo Dang-bo	서당보	徐堂輔	1881–1882	Gojong	
Song Geun-su	송근수	宋近洙	1882	Gojong	
Shin Eung-jo	신응조	申應朝	1882	Gojong	
Kim Byeong-deok	김병덕	金炳德	1883–1884	Gojong	
Shim Soon-taek	심순택	沈舜澤	1884	Gojong	
Kim Hong-jip	김홍집	金弘集	1884	Gojong	
Kim Byeong-si	김병시	金炳始	1884–1885	Gojong	
Kim Yu-yeon	김유연	金有淵	1886–1887	Gojong	
Jo Byeong-se	조병세	趙秉世	1889–1890	Gojong	
Jeong Beom-jo	정범조	鄭範朝	1890–1892	Gojong	
Jo Byeong-se	조병세	趙秉世	1892	Gojong	
Jeong Beom-jo	정범조	鄭範朝	1892–1894	Gojong	the last Uŭijŏng
