= Oh (surname) =

Korean surname

- Hangul: 오
- Hanja: 吳; 伍; 吾; 五; 晤
- RR: O
- MR: O

Oh or O is a family name in Korea. It is written using the hanja characters, 吳, 五, 伍, 吾, and 晤. According to the 2015 census in South Korea, there were 763,281 people carrying the O surname.

== History ==
The earliest ancestor of the Korean Oh family is believed to be Oh Eung (Korean: 오응; Hanja: 吳應) from Silla, the son of Oh Cheom known to be the Chinese royal descendant who migrated from China to Korea and married the daughter of Kim Jong-ji in Silla.

16 clans have historically emerged under the family name Oh. The largest five clans, in order, are Haeju, Dongbok, Boseong, Hamyang, and Gunwi Oh clans. Out of these clans, the three largest clans were founded by the three brothers of Oh Hyeon-bo, Oh Hyeon-jwa, and Oh Hyun-pil, who each was given the governor position of Haeju, Dongbok, and Boseong counties as the rewards for defending Goryeo against the attack by the Khitan people.

Each of the five biggest clans traces its founder back to:

- Haeju Oh Clan: Oh Heyon-bo, the governor of Haeju County during the era of Goryeo
- Dongbok Oh Clan: Oh Hyeon-jwa, the governor of Dongbok County during the era of Goryeo
- Boseong Oh Clan: Oh Hyun-pil, the governor of Boseong County during the era of Goryeo
- Hamyang Oh Clan: Oh Gwang-hwi, the official during the era of Goryeo
- Gunwi Oh Clan: Oh Suk-gwi, the second son of Oh Hyeon-jwa who later became the governor of Gunwi county during the era of Goryeo

In the modern era, the O (or Oh) family of North Korea is a North Korean family whose members have been considered close to the ruling Kim family over several generations because of O Jung-hup, who was a revolutionary fighter closely associated with Kim Il-sung. They are regarded as being highly influential in the North Korean regime and second only to the Kim's.

== Global distribution ==
Most Koreans in the US prefer the surname Oh rather than O as a single letter name can often be misunderstood as an abbreviation or misprinting.

== List of people with the surname ==
- Cédric O, French politician, Secretary of State for Digital Affairs
- Oh Beom-seok, South Korean footballer
- Oh Dae-gyu, South Korean actor
- Oh Dae-hwan, South Korean actor
- Oh Dae-keun, South Korean field hockey player
- Oh Dal-su, South Korean actor
- David Oh, Korean American politician
- Delphine O, French politician, member of the National Assembly for Paris's 16th constituency
- Diana Oh (1986–2025), American artist and activist
- Oh Eun-seok, South Korean sabre fencer
- Oh Eun-sun, South Korean mountaineer
- Oh Eun-young, South Korean TV Host, model and beauty pageant titleholder
- Felicia Oh, American black belt in Brazilian jiu-jitsu and submission grappling competitor
- Oh Ha-young, South Korean actress and singer, member of girl group Apink
- Hee Oh, South Korean mathematician
- Oh Hee-joon, South Korean actor
- Oh Hye-soo, South Korean actress
- Oh Hyeon-gyu, South Korean footballer
- Oh Hyuk, South Korean singer, member of indie rock band Hyukoh
- Oh Hye-rin (stage name Raina), South Korean singer, member of girl group After School
- Oh In-kyun, South Korean footballer
- Oh Jae-il, South Korean baseball player
- Oh Jae-moo, South Korean actor
- Oh Jae-suk, South Korean footballer
- Oh Jae-seong, South Korean volleyball player
- Oh Jae-won, South Korean baseball player
- Oh Jang-eun, South Korean footballer
- Oh Ji-eun, South Korean actress
- Oh Ji-ho, South Korean actor and model
- Oh Ji-hwan, South Korean baseball player
- Oh Ji-min (stage name J-Min), South Korean singer
- Oh Ji-young, South Korean professional golfer
- Oh Ji-young, South Korean professional volleyball player
- Oh Jin-hyek, South Korean archer
- O Jin-u (1917–1995), North Korean marshal and Politburo member
- Oh Jong-hyuk, South Korean singer and actor
- Oh Joo-ho, South Korean footballer
- Oh Ju-hyun, South Korean football midfielder
- Oh Ju-won, South Korean baseball pitcher
- Oh Joo-yeon, South Korean voice actress
- Oh Joon, South Korean ambassador to the United Nations
- Junggeun Oh, South Korean artist
- O Jung-hup (1910–1939), North Korean military officer
- Oh Jung-se, South Korean actor
- Oh Man-seok, South Korean actor
- Oh Min-keun, South Korean former boxer
- Oh Min-suk, South Korean actor
- Oh Min-taek (stage name Elo), South Korean singer
- Sandra Oh, Canadian-American actress
- Oh Sang-uk, South Korean fencer
- Oh Sangwon, South Korean author
- Oh Se-hoon, South Korean politician
- Oh Se-hun, South Korean singer and actor, member of boy group Exo
- Oh Se-hun, South Korean footballer
- Oh Seong-dae, South Korean webtoon artist
- Oh Seung-ah, South Korean actress and singer, former member of girl group Rainbow
- Oh Seung-bum, South Korean football midfielder
- Oh Seung-hoon, South Korean footballer
- Oh Seung-hoon, South Korean actor and model
- Seung-hwan Oh, South Korean baseball pitcher
- Oh Seung-lip, South Korean judo practitioner
- Oh Seung-shin, South Korean field hockey player
- Oh Seung-soon, South Korean fencer
- Oh Seung-yoon, South Korean actor
- Oh Seong-ok, South Korean handball player
- Oh Taeseok, South Korean playwright and director
- Oh Takbeon, South Korean poet, author and critic
- Oh Uhtaek, South Korean physiologist
- Oh Yeon-ah, South Korean actress
- Oh Yeon-ho, South Korean journalist
- Oh Yeon-seo, South Korean actress
- O Yeong-su (1909–1979), South Korean novelist
- O Yeong-su, South Korean actor
- O Yoon (1946–1986), South Korean painter
- Oh Yoon-ah, South Korean actress
- Oh Youn-hyung, South Korean rugby union player
- Oh Yoon-kyung, North Korean former football defender
- Oh Yon-kyung, South Korean former volleyball player
- Oh Yong-ran, South Korean handball player
- Oh Young-ki, South Korean handball player
- Oh Yun-kyo (1960–2000), South Korean footballer
- Oh Yun-suk, South Korean handball player

== See also ==
- List of Korean surnames
- O family (North Korea), an influential family within the North Korean regime
- Ou (surname), for Chinese surnames sometimes rendered Ao, Au, O, or Oh
- Wang (surname), an East Asian surname rendered as Ō in Japanese
