= Jangheung O clan =

Korean clan from South Jeolla Province

- Country: Korea
- Current region: Jangheung County
- Founder: O Cheon-u

Jangheung O clan (Korean: 장흥 오씨; Hanja: 長興 吳氏) was one of the Korean clans. Their Bon-gwan was in Jangheung County, South Jeolla Province. According to the research in 2000, the number of Jangheung O clan was 3564. Their founder was O Cheon-u. O Cheon-u was a 7th descendant of O Hyeon-pil who was a founder of Boseong O clan. O Hyeon-pil was a 24th descendant of O Cheom (Hanja: 吳瞻) who came over from China to Silla during Jijeung of Silla’s reign in Silla dynasty. O Cheon-u passed Imperial examination during Taejong of Joseon’s reign in Joseon dynasty. As a result, O Cheon-u served as Byeongmajeoldosa (Korean: 병마절도사; Hanja: 兵馬節度使) and was appointed as Prince of Jangheung (Hanja: 長興君). Then, O Cheon-u began Jangheung O clan.

== See also ==
- Korean clan names of foreign origin
