= O Kuk-ryol =

North Korean politician and general (1930–2023)

- 오극렬

Vice-Chairman of the National Defence Commission
- In office April 2009 – 30 June 2016
- Leader: Kim Jong Il; Kim Jong Un
- Succeeded by: Commission abolished

Personal details
- Born: 7 January 1930 Onjō, Kankyōhoku-dō, Korea, Japan
- Died: 9 February 2023 (aged 93) Pyongyang, North Korea

Military service
- Allegiance: North Korea
- Branch/service: Korean People's Army
- Rank: General

Korean name
- Hangul: 오극렬
- Hanja: 呉克烈
- RR: O Geukryeol
- MR: O Kŭngnyŏl

O Kuk-ryol (Korean: 오극렬; Hancha: 呉克烈, 7 January 1930 – 9 February 2023) was a North Korean military general. He was Chief of General Staff of the Korean People's Army from 1979 to 1988. He also served as vice-chairman of the National Defence Commission of North Korea, head of the Operations Department from April 2009 to June 2016. Foreign observers referred to O as the second most powerful man in North Korea.

A childhood friend of Kim Jong Il, O was one of Kim's allies elected to the Politburo in 1980. He later led North Korean programs for cyberwarfare, counterfeiting, and nuclear weapons.

== Military career ==
The son of O Jung-song and nephew of O Jung-hup, who fought the Japanese with Kim Il Sung, O was among war orphans under the care of Kim Il Sung's wife Kim Jong-suk and was a close personal friend of Kim Jong Il from childhood.

After attending Mangyongdae Revolutionary School, Kim Il Sung University, and air force academies in the Soviet Union, O served as an air force commander. In 1964, he began as a major general and superintendent of Kim Chaek Air Force Academy, the DPRK's top air force academy. In 1968, he became a lieutenant general and commander of the Korean People's Army Air and Anti-Air Force.

He commanded a group of North Korean pilots and instructors sent to aid the Egyptian Air Force in 1973. During the Yom Kippur War, North Korean pilots flew Egyptian fighters.

O was appointed Deputy Chief of the General Staff Department of the Korean People's Army in 1977, and Chief in 1979.

== Political career ==
In 1967, O was elected deputy to the Supreme People's Assembly. In 1970, he was named a member of the 5th Central Committee of the Workers' Party of Korea.

He became part of the "1980 group," who rose to power as Kim Jong Il succeeded Kim Il Sung. At the Party's 6th Congress, O was elected member of the 6th Politburo and the 6th Central Military Commission. He was later awarded the Order of Kim Il Sung, promoted to general and put in charge of the Mirim Electronic Warfare Institute for developing cyber warfare. A dispute with Minister of People's Armed Forces O Jin-u in 1988 led to his demotion and forced him to undertake a period of re-education; this may have had to do with enabling his later counterfeiting activities.

In 1989, O was pardoned and appointed head of the Party's Civil Defense Department, then head of the Operations Department, which was transferred under the National Defence Commission in 2009. Together with So Sang Guk and Jon Pyong Ho, O led the early stages of the North Korean nuclear weapons programme.

O Kuk-ryol migrated with the department, assuming the post of vice-chairman of the NDC in April 2009. He was reelected to the 6th Central Committee at the 3rd Conference of the Workers' Party of Korea in September 2010, but kept out of the Politburo and the Central Military Commission of the Workers' Party of Korea. Nevertheless, he was considered among "senior officials of party, state, army, security organs, and national institutions".

In June 2009, O was identified by international authorities and the United States government as a key figure in North Korea's currency counterfeiting activities, specifically with United States one hundred-dollar bills, known as Superdollars.

== Under Kim Jong-un ==
O Kuk-ryol took part at a meeting of top leaders held immediately after Kim Jong Il's death on 17 December 2011 to plan the funeral and succession. He was a member of the Kim Jong-il funeral committee. As a Kim loyalist, speculations named him as a possible successor of Kim Jong Un, and the regime appeared to be purging O's protégés in January 2011 to prevent him from being a threat to Jong-un. After the execution of Jang Sung-taek in December 2013, a powerful rival, O re-emerged as more of a public figure.

O died from heart failure on 9 February 2023, at age 93.

== Family ==
O was reported to have also involved members of his family, including his son O Se-won, in the counterfeiting business, which reportedly took place at the Pyongsong Trademark Printing Factory, a factory under the control of O's Operations Department. His other son O Se-uk, who was also a military general, defected to the United States in 2004. He also had five daughters, the eldest of which is a screenwriter for a film studio. O was also reportedly fluent in Russian, Chinese, and English. In 2006, a South Korean intelligence report noted he was perceived as reliable and knew South Korea well.

O family

?
O Jung-song	O Jung-hup (1910–1939)
O Kuk-ryol (1930–2023)
O Hye-young (1956–)	O Hyon-ok (1958–)	O Young-ae (1960–)	O Se-uk (1962–)	O Hye-sun (1965–)	O Young-ran	O Se-won	So Ho-won (in-law)

Military offices
Preceded by O Jin-u	Chief of the General Staff of the Korean People's Army; September 1979 – February 1988	Succeeded by Choe Kwang
