= Heungyang O clan =

Korean clan from South Jeolla Province

- Country: Korea
- Current region: Goheung County
- Founder: O Wan

Heungyang O clan (Korean: 흥양 오씨; Hanja: 興陽 吳氏) was one of the Korean clans. Their Bon-gwan was in Goheung County, South Jeolla Province. According to the research in 2000, the number of Heungyang O clan was 1984. Their founder was O Wan. O Wan was a 4th descendant of O Yang (Hanja: 吳良) who was a second son of O Hyeon-pil. O Hyeon-pil was a founder of Boseong O clan and was a 24th descendant of O Cheom (Hanja: 吳瞻). O Cheom (Hanja: 吳瞻) came over from China to Silla during Jijeung of Silla’s reign in Silla.

== See also ==
- Korean clan names of foreign origin
