= Ch'ae Chegong =

Joseon-era Korean scholar and politician

Ch'ae Chegong 蔡濟恭
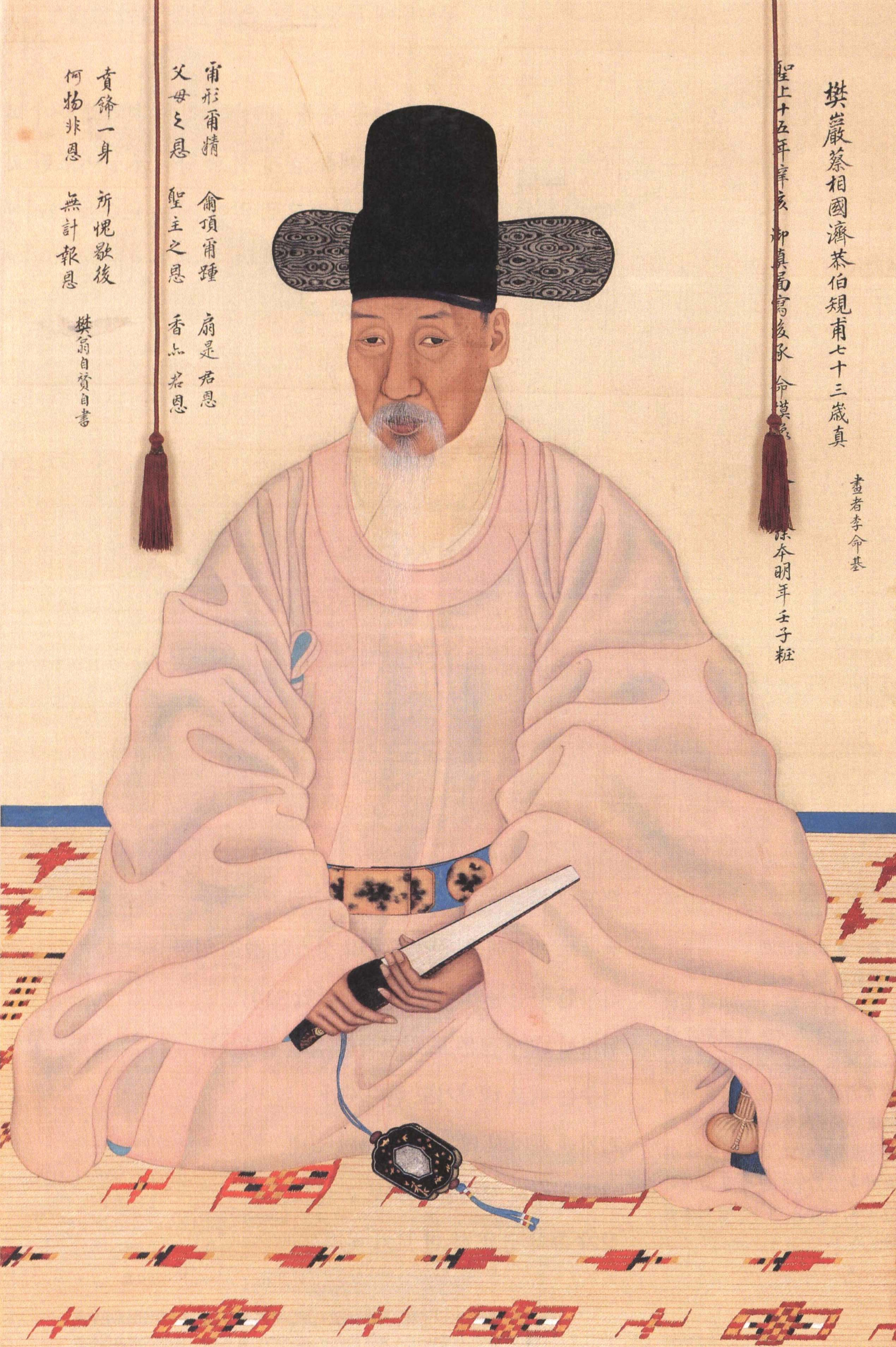
- Portrait of Ch'ae Chegong who served as Yŏngŭijŏng during the reign of King Jeongjo.

Chief State Councillor
- In office July 2, 1793 – July 11, 1793
- Preceded by: Kim Ik
- Succeeded by: Hong Naksŏng

Left State Councillor
- In office January 25, 1796 – July 14, 1798
- Preceded by: Yu Ŏnho
- Succeeded by: Yi Pyŏngmo
- In office November 14, 1789 – July 2, 1793
- Preceded by: Yi Chaehyŏp
- Succeeded by: Kim Chongsu

Right State Councillor
- In office February 15, 1795 – January 25, 1796
- Preceded by: Yi Pyŏngmo
- Succeeded by: Yun Sidong
- In office March 18, 1788 – November 14, 1789
- Preceded by: Yi Sŏngwŏn
- Succeeded by: Kim Chongsu

Personal details
- Born: May 12, 1720 Hongju-mok, Chungcheong Province, Joseon
- Died: February 22, 1799 (aged 78) Hanseong-bu, Joseon
- Spouse(s): Lady O of the Dongbok O clan Lady Kwŏn of the Andong Kwŏn clan Unnamed woman
- Children: Chae Hongwŏn (adopted son); Chae Honggŭn (son); Chae Hongsin (son)
- Parents: Ch'ae Ŭng'il (father); Lady Yi of the Yonan Yi clan (mother)

Korean name
- Hangul: 채제공
- Hanja: 蔡濟恭
- RR: Chae Jegong
- MR: Ch'ae Chegong

Art name
- Hangul: 번암, 번옹
- Hanja: 樊巖, 樊翁
- RR: Beonam, Beonong
- MR: Pŏnam, Pŏnong

Courtesy name
- Hangul: 백규
- Hanja: 伯規
- RR: Baekgyu
- MR: Paekkyu

Posthumous name
- Hangul: 문숙
- Hanja: 文肅
- RR: Munsuk
- MR: Munsuk

Ch'ae Chegong (May 12, 1720 – February 22, 1799) was a scholar, writer, and politician of the Joseon period of Korea. Ch'ae was the leader of the Southerners (or Namin faction) during the reign of King Jeongjo. He passed the regional civil examination (향시) at the age of 15, the munkwa exam at age 23 in 1743, and held high government offices throughout his life, the Yŏngŭijŏng position (i.e. Chief State Councilor) among them. He came from the Pyeonggang Ch'ae clan.

== Family ==
- Grandfather
  - Ch'ae Sŏng'yun (채성윤; 蔡成胤; 1659–1733)
- Father
  - Ch'ae Ŭng'il (채응일; 蔡應一; 1686–1765)=
- Mother
  - Lady Yi of the Yonan Yi clan (연안 이씨)
    - Grandfather - Yi Mansŏng (이만성; 李萬成)
- Siblings
  - Older sister - Lady Ch'ae (채씨)
    - Brother-in-law - Sim Chiyŏn (심지연; 沈祉衍)
  - Older sister - Lady Ch'ae (채씨)
    - Brother-in-law - Yi T'aeun (이태운; 李台運)
- Wive(s) and children
  - Lady O of the Dongbok O clan (동복 오씨)
  - Lady Kwŏn of the Andong Kwŏn clan (안동 권씨)
    - Adoptive son - Ch'ae Hongwŏn (채홍원, 蔡弘遠; 1762–1832) – his biological father was one of Ch'ae Chegong's relatives, Chae Mingong (채민공; 蔡敏恭)
  - Unnamed concubine
    - Son - Ch'ae Hong-gŭn (채홍근; 蔡弘謹)
      - Daughter-in-law - Lady Chŏng of the Naju Chŏng clan (나주 정씨; 羅州 丁氏)
    - Son - Ch'ae Hong-sin (채홍신; 蔡弘愼)

== Gallery ==
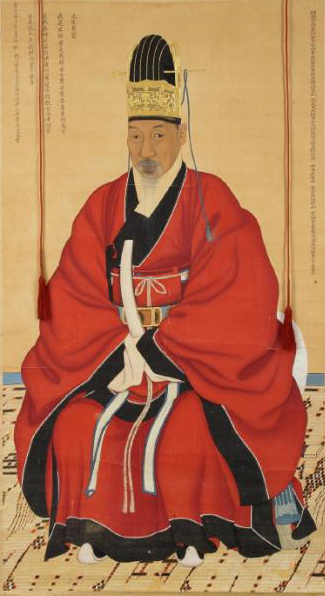
Portrait of Ch'ae Chegong in Geumgwanjobok” painted by Yi Myŏnggi in 1792.

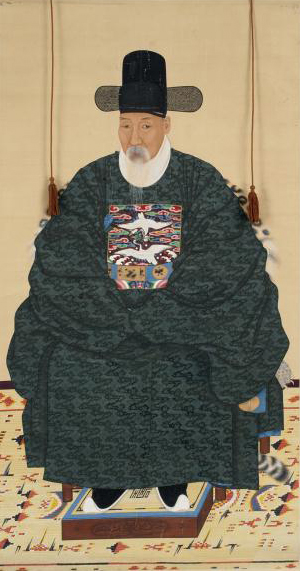
Portrait of Ch'ae Chegong in black danryeongpo” painted by Yi Myŏnggi in 1792.

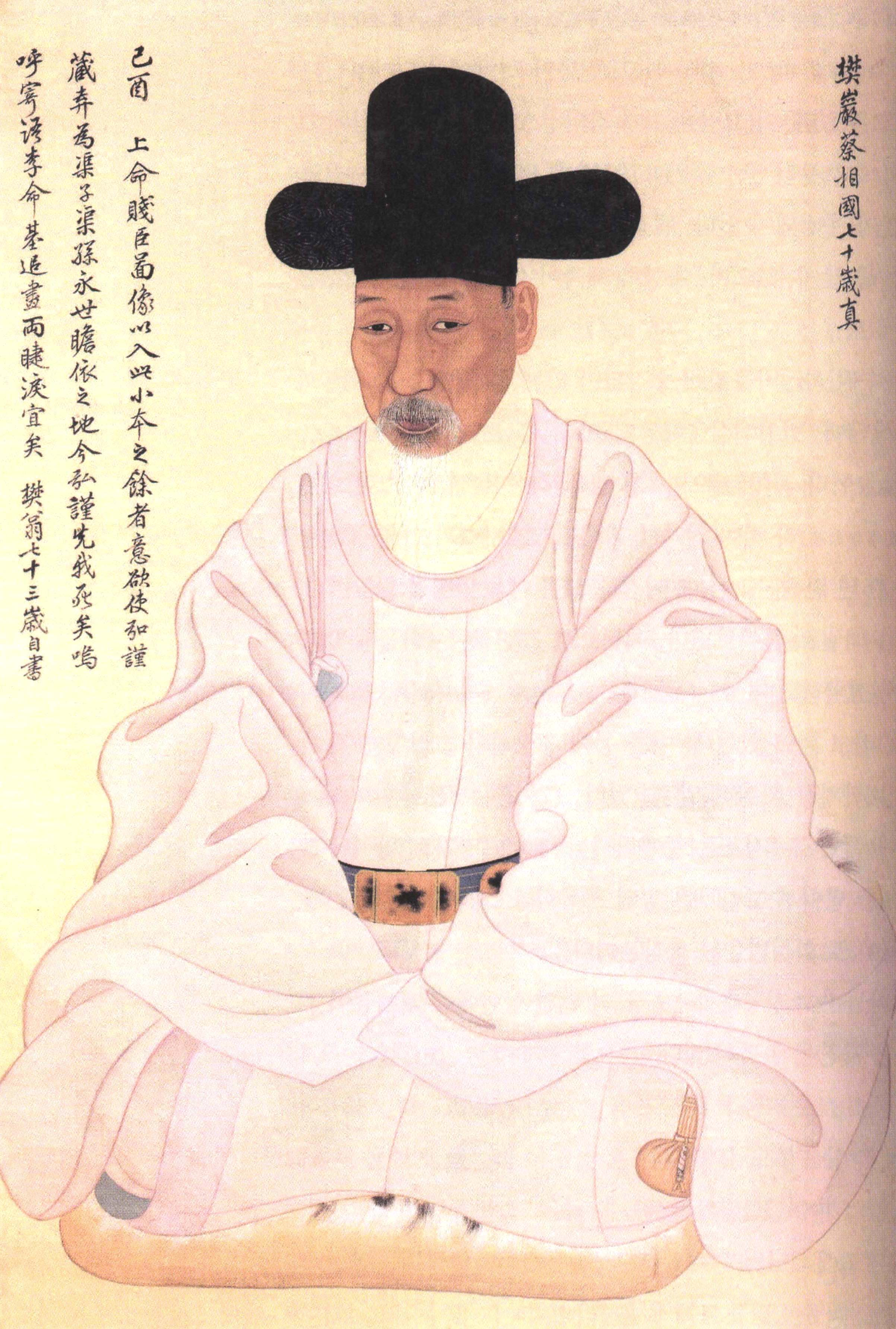
Portrait of Ch'ae Chegong painted by Myŏnggi in 1789.

== In popular culture ==
- Portrayed by Park Woong in the 2007 CGV TV series Eight Days, Assassination Attempts against King Jeongjo.
- Portrayed by Han In-soo in the 2007–2008 MBC TV series Lee San, Wind of the Palace.
- Portrayed by Kim Ik-tae in the 2010 KBS2 TV series Sungkyunkwan Scandal
