= 吳 =

吳 or 呉 is an East Asian character for a word or morpheme.

It may refer to:

- Kure, Hiroshima, a city in Japan
- O (surname), a common Korean surname
- Wu (surname), the pinyin transliteration of a common Chinese surname
- Ng (name), a Cantonese surname
