= Inkstand =

Stand or tray used for holding writing instruments

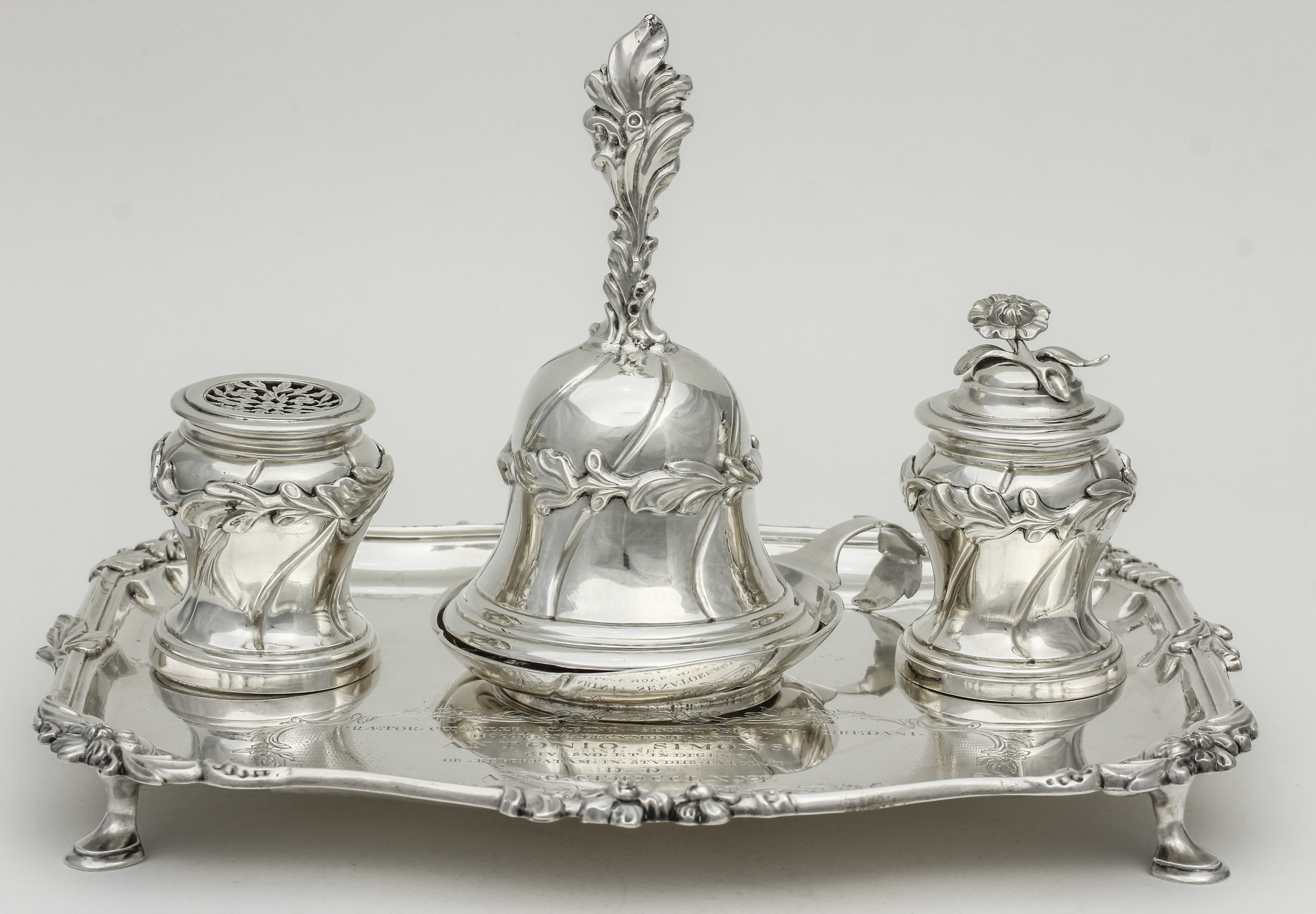
Five-piece silver inkstand for Antonius Simons van Breda (1750-1823), made by silversmith Johannes Adrianus van der Toorn (1747-1832), collection KU Leuven

An inkstand is a stand, tray, or casket used to house writing instruments. They were generally portable objects, intended to sit on the table or desk where the person was writing. They were useful household objects when quill pens and dip pens were in everyday use. At the most basic, an inkstand had a pen, a tightly-capped inkwell, and a sand shaker for rapidly drying the ink after it was written on the page.

Other items might also be included. A penwiper (a cloth for wiping blobs of ink off the end of the pen) would often be included, and from the mid-nineteenth century, an inkstand might have a box or compartment for steel nibs used in dip pens. They might have a box or drawer for sealing wax and other necessities, such as a candle and a candle holder to use while melting the wax wafers.

Inkstands could be made of any material. In middle-class households, they might be made of tin, wood, pewter or brass. In wealthier households, they were most often made of silver or sometimes porcelain, and could be decorated with crystal, mother of pearl, gold, or even jewels.

Inkstands with tightly closing lids, often finely made, were part and parcel of a traveling kit, until the widespread use of the fountain pen. Inkstands were going out of use before the development of ballpoint pen, which finished them as a primary source of ink.

An older name for an inkstand was a standish. During the 19th century, they were sometimes called pen rests.

== Historic examples ==
Relatively few inkstands survive.

The Syng inkstand, made in 1752 by Philip Syng, was used in Philadelphia's Independence Hall by the American delegates to sign both the Declaration of Independence in 1776 and the United States Constitution in 1787.

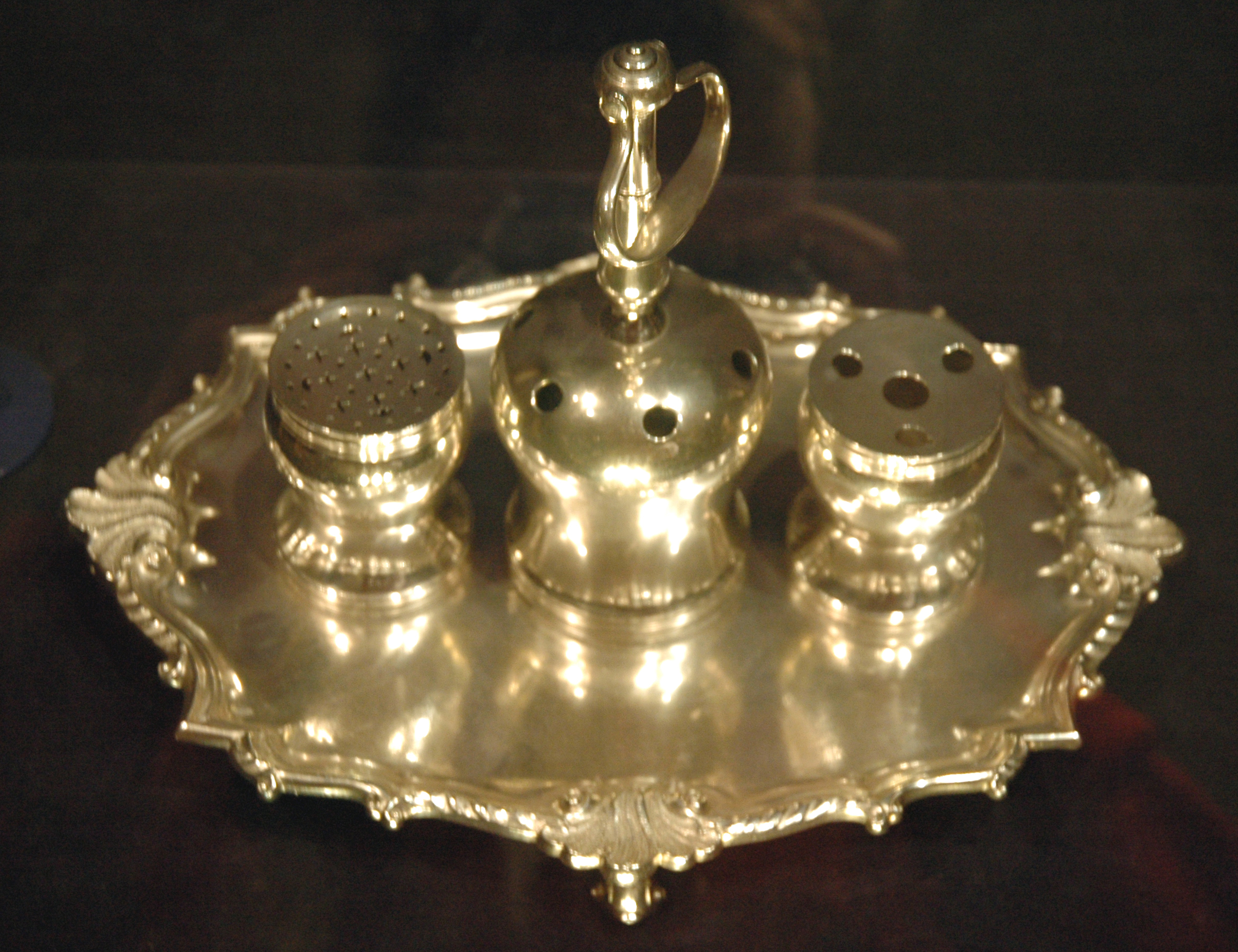
The Syng inkstand

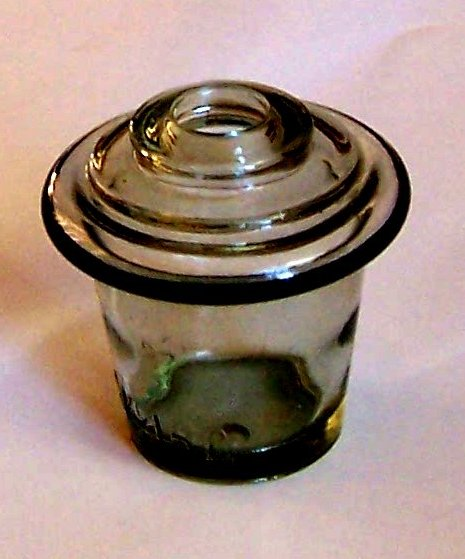
The school inkstand

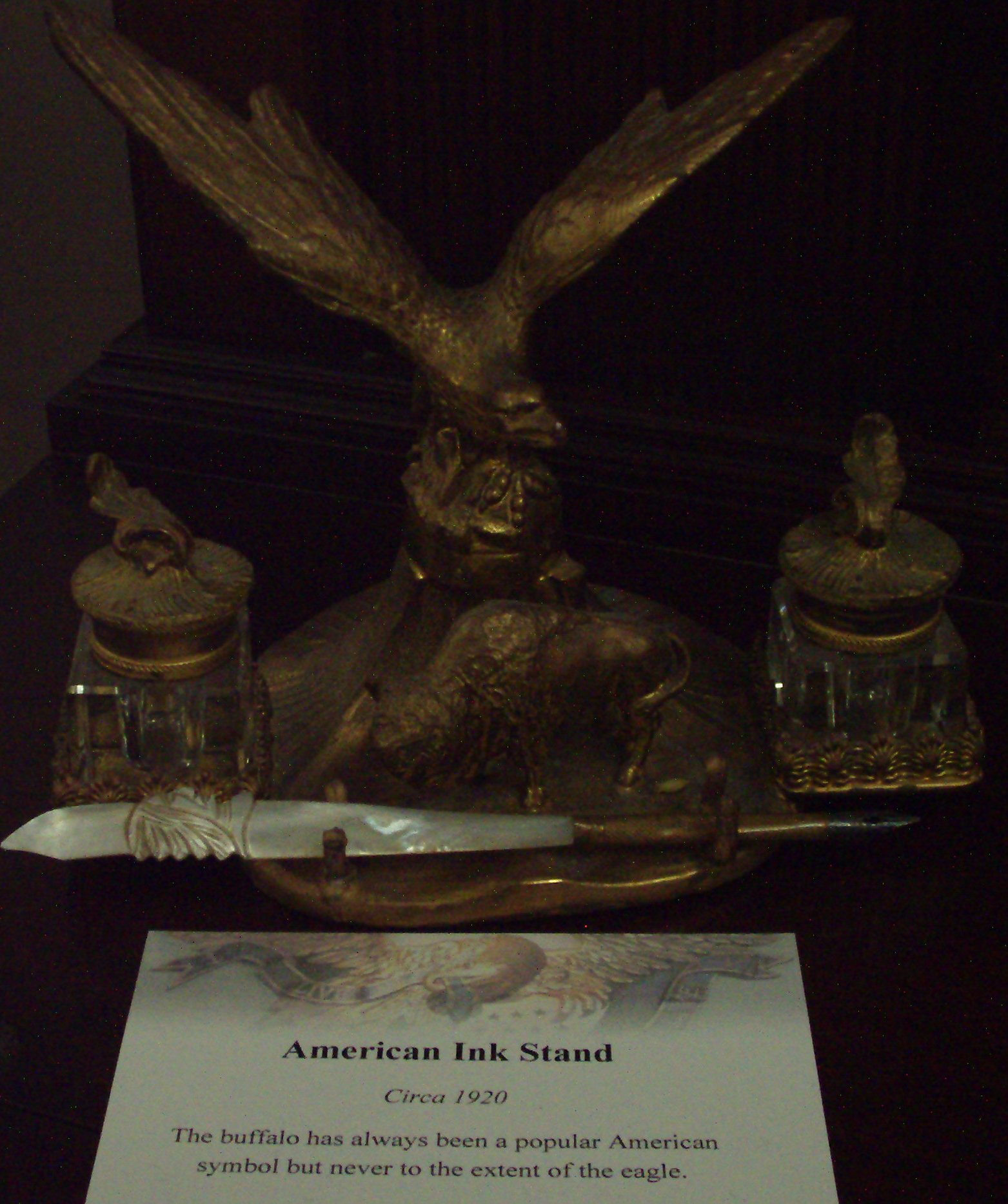
1920 inkstand

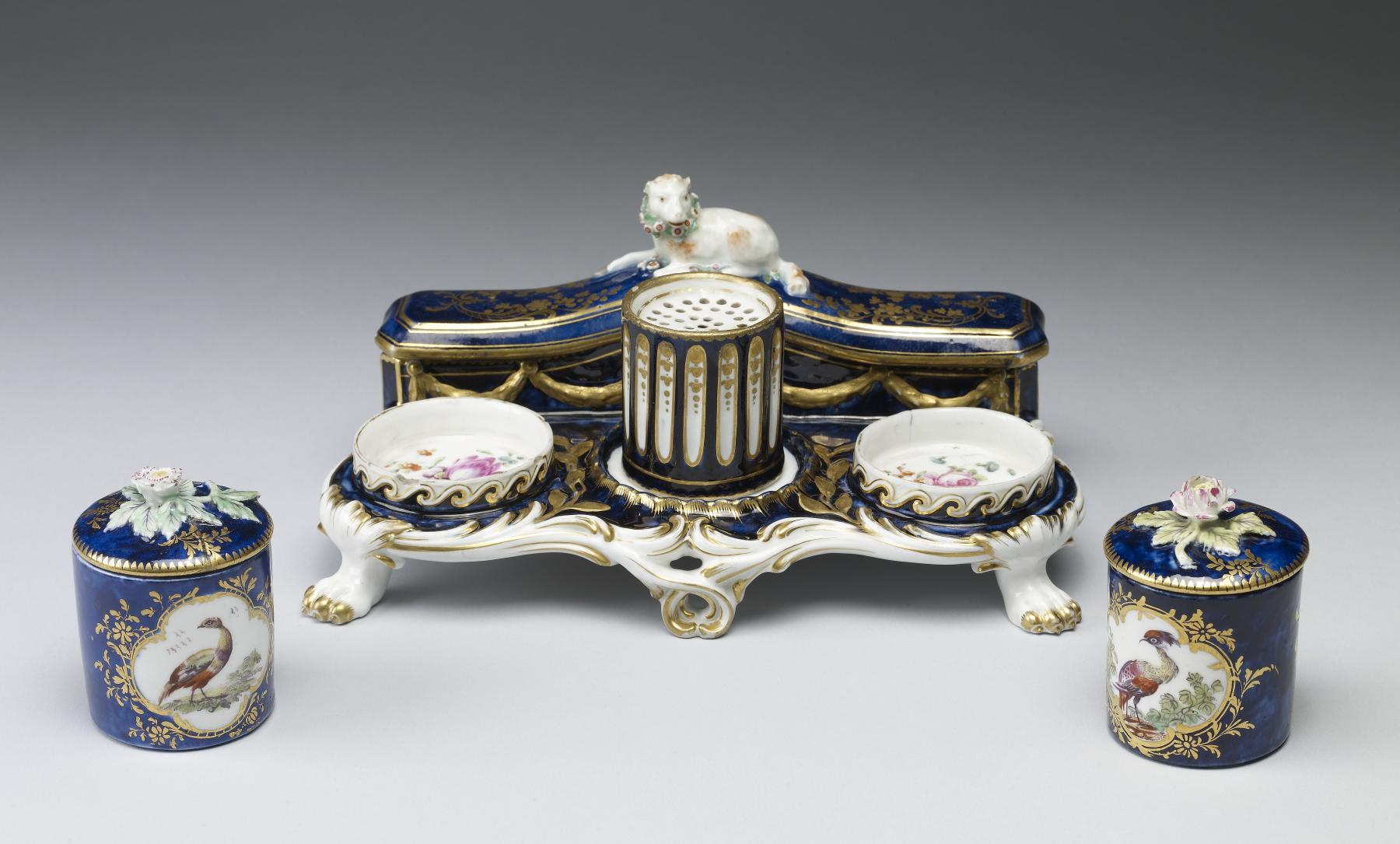
Porcelain inkstand. The Walters Art Museum

== See also ==
- Pounce (powder)
