= Hwasun O clan =

Korean clan from South Jeolla Province

- Country: Korea
- Current region: Hwasun County
- Founder: O Won (Hanja: 吳元)

Hwasun O clan (Korean: 화순 오씨; Hanja: 和順 吳氏) was one of the Korean clans. Their Bon-gwan was in Hwasun County, South Jeolla Province. According to the research in 2000, the number of Hwasun O clan was 3032. Their founder was O Won (Hanja: 吳元). O Won (Hanja: 吳元) was a 3rd son of O Hyeon pil who was a founder of Boseong O clan. O Hyeon pil came over from China to Silla during Jijeung of Silla’s reign in Silla dynasty.

== See also ==
- Korean clan names of foreign origin
