= Gunwi O clan =

Korean clan from North Gyeongsang Province

- Country: Korea
- Current region: Gunwi County
- Founder: O Suk gwi

Gunwi O clan (Korean: 군위 오씨; Hanja: 軍威 吳氏) was one of the Korean clans. Their Bon-gwan was in Gunwi County, North Gyeongsang Province. According to the research in 2015, the number of Gunwi O clan was 26949. Their founder was O Suk-gwi (Korean: 오숙귀; Hanja: 呉淑貴), the governor of Gunwi County during the era of Goryeo dynasty. He was the son of O Hyeon-jwa (Korean: 오현좌; Hanja: 呉賢佐) who was the governor of Dongbok County and founder of Dongbok O clan.
