= Tori Go! Go! =

- Starring: Lee Seon-joo
- Country of origin: South Korea
- No. of episodes: 51

Production
- Running time: 30 min of 10 min.

Original release
- Network: KBS
- Release: July 2006

Tori Go! Go! (Korean: 토리 고고) is a South Korean animated television series. It is a product of the major broadcaster KBS and the animation was done by Duru Fix, Gangwon Information and Multimedia corporation and DPS Corporation. The story centers on the girl character Tori Go! Go!, a troublesome teenage girl often compared in temperament to a squirrel.

== Producer information ==
- Title: Tori Go! Go! (토리 GO! GO!)
- Original creator: Kim Na-kyeong
- Genre: Comic sitcom
- Mode: TV Animation Series of 17 parts, each 30 minutes (51 parts, each 10 minutes)
- Made present: 2D Animation
- animation producers: Duru Fix, Gangwon Information and Multimedia Corporation, DPS Corporation

== Characters ==
- Tori
- Woori
- Rori
- Mother
- Father
- Jeongyeon
- Boba
- Gonggi Girl

== Episodes ==
The English name is on the left of the Korean name.

- Part 1: 300 Won/Tori & Beast/Mini Hen Meri (삼백원/토리와 야수/병아리 메리)
- Part 2: Rain Day/Gonggi Play/Rori's Desk (비오는 날/공기놀이/로리의 책상)
- Part 3: Terrible Wheel/Crash/Terrible Story (무서운 바퀴/상처/무서운 이야기)
- Part 4: Cry it/Bicycle/We house 3 Sisters (억울해/자전거/우리집 세자매)

== Voice actors ==
- Lee Seon-joo
- Kim Ah-yeong
- Oh Joo-yeon
- Kim Chang-ki
