= OhmyNews =

South Korean online news website

OhmyNews 오마이뉴스
- Available in: Korean
- Owner: Oh Yeon-ho
- Revenue: US$70,000
- Website: international.ohmynews.com
- Commercial: Yes
- Registration: Required
- Launched: 22 February 2000; 26 years ago
- Current status: Online

OhmyNews (Korean: 오마이뉴스) is a South Korean online news website. It was founded by Oh Yeon Ho on 22 February 2000. The site's motto is "Every Citizen is a Reporter", which reflects its status as the first news website in Korea to accept, edit, and publish articles from its readers in an open source-style. About 20% of the site's content is written by the 55-person staff; most articles are written by freelance contributors.

== Political position ==
OhmyNews is consistently considered liberal and progressive. This is in contrast to the somewhat more moderate liberal Hankyoreh and Kyunghyang. It is considered anti-imperialist, anti-racist, and anti-xenophobic; however, anti-China/anti-Japan left-wing nationalist media is common among South Korean liberals. The site is also generally critical of the "hegemonic nationalism" of the Chinese and Japanese governments, and supports "resistance nationalism". The site strongly criticizes and opposes anti-Japanese and anti-Chinese sentiment that is expressed as racism rather than anti-imperialism.

OhmyNews is not anti-American, but often criticizes U.S. foreign policy. It opposes improving Japan-South Korea relations and is particularly negative about cooperation in the military sector. In 2022, an article on OhmyNews criticized the U.S. effort to improve Japan-South Korea relations to counter China as sacrificing South Korea.

== History ==
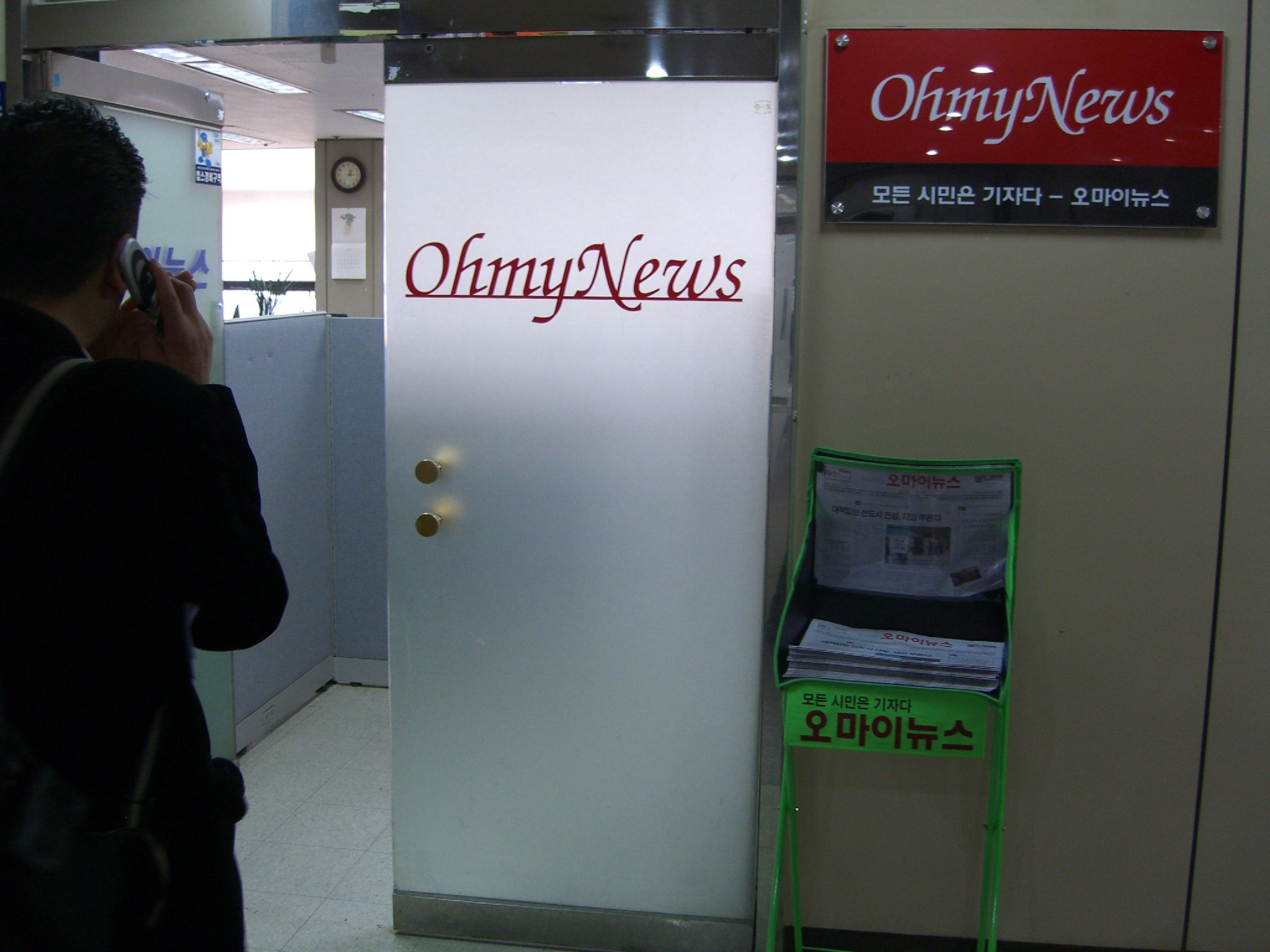
OhmyNews office

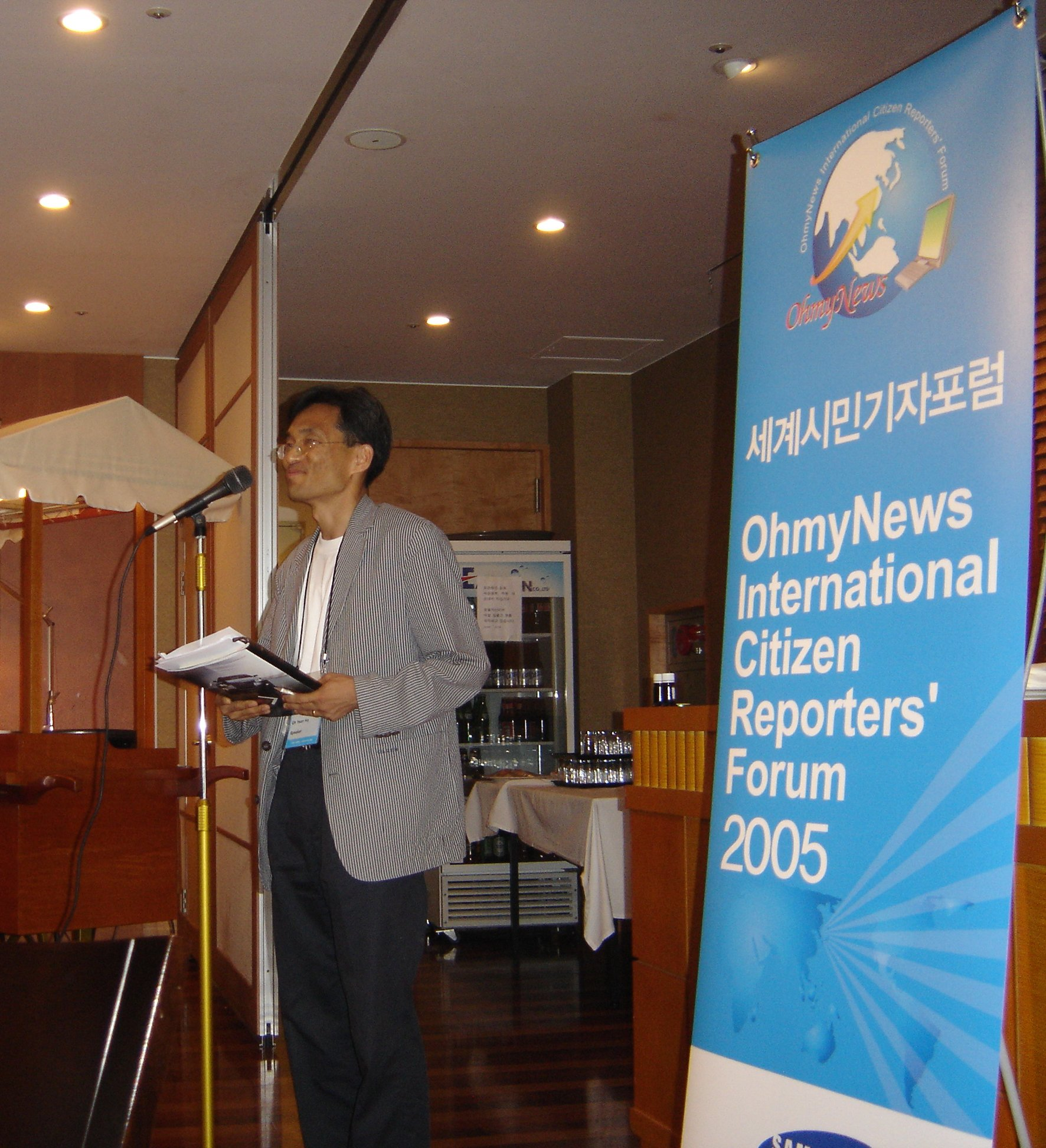
Oh Yeon Ho

OhmyNews was influential in determining the outcome of the 2002 South Korean presidential election. After being elected, President Roh Moo-hyun granted his first interview to OhmyNews. OhmyNews International is an English language online newspaper that features "citizen reporter" articles written by contributors from all over the globe. Its content is almost 100% citizen reporter.

On 22 February 2006, OhmyNews and Japanese firm Softbank signed an investment contract valued at US$11 million. In 2006 OhmyNews started to build a Japan-based citizen-participatory journalism site called OhmyNews Japan, launched on 28 August with a famous Japanese journalist and 22 other employees working under ten reporters. These journalists' articles were the object of much criticism; on 17 November 2006, the newspaper ended the citizen-participation aspect of the paper. The South Korean newspaper admitted that OhmyNews Japan had failed. In July 2008, all staff of OhmyNews Japan were dismissed, and by the end of August operations had ceased on the site.

The 2nd Citizen Reporters' Forum was held by OhmyNews in Seoul, Korea from 12–15 July 2006. "Curators are important to our operation. They are given a great deal of trust. In order to maintain credibility amongst our team members, new curators join through recommendations of existing curators. And even amongst the curators we have different levels depending on their experience and contributions. This is to maintain a steady level of quality and credibility with our readers." During the declaration of martial law in 2024, an OhmyNews live stream captured Democratic Party deputy spokeswoman Ahn Gwi-ryeong confronting a soldier with a rifle, which was seen by millions on X (formerly twitter).

=== Financing ===
OhmyNews is losing original features as alternative–independent media in financial independence. Oh Yeon-ho said, "70 to 80 percent of our revenue came from corporate advertising and sponsorships. In contrast, contributions from readers only totaled five percent of total revenue." Oh also said, "We have not received a cent from Lee Myung-bak government for central government advertising." A government report to National Assembly in 2009 revealed that OhmyNews received ₩120 million (approximately US$100,000) for government advertising from February 2008 to July 2009. An OhmyNews report also indicated that they had received about ₩870 million (approximately US$900,000) for government advertising from 2003 to 2007 by introducing government official reports to National Assembly.

An alternative medium Pressian reported Oh's comments, "I respect Samsung as major business partner," and introduced about 20 percent of the total advertising and cooperation revenue of OhmyNews is coming from Samsung for years, the biggest business corporate of Korea. On 8 July 2009, Oh Yeon-ho revealed that OhmyNews was losing up to ₩700 million yearly, and appealed to website users to join a voluntary subscription scheme.

== OhmyNews International ==
In September 2010, OhmyNews International changed its format from citizen journalism to becoming a forum about citizen journalism. Verifying facts from around the world became too difficult. The old site is an archive and does not accept new articles.

== See also ==
- Culture of South Korea
- Media in South Korea
