= O family =

North Korean family

- O
- Hangul: 오
- Hanja: 吳
- RR: O
- MR: O
- IPA: [o]

The O (or Oh) family is a North Korean family whose members have been considered close to the ruling Kim family over several generations, and is regarded as being highly influential in the North Korean regime. The designation originates with O Jung-hup whose 1939 death while fighting for Kim Il Sung is deemed a great act of loyalty.

Their members include:

- O Jung-hup, revolutionary fighter associated with Kim Il Sung
- O Kuk-ryol, nephew of O Jung-hup, Vice-Chairman of the National Defense Commission of the DPRK
- O Se-won, son of O Kuk-ryol
- O Se-uk, son of O Kuk-ryol, and defector to the US

== Family tree ==
O family

?
O Jung-song	O Jung-hup (1910–1939)
O Kuk-ryol (1930–2023)
O Hye-young (1956–)	O Hyon-ok (1958–)	O Young-ae (1960–)	O Se-uk (1962–)	O Hye-sun (1965–)	O Young-ran	O Se-won	So Ho-won (in-law)

== See also ==
- O (surname)
