= United States one-hundred-dollar bill =

Current denomination of United States currency

One hundred dollars
- Country: United States
- Value: $100
- Width: 157 mm
- Height: 66.3 mm
- Weight: ≈ 1.0 g
- Security features: Security fibers, watermark, 3D security ribbon, security thread, color shifting ink, microprinting, raised printing, EURion constellation
- Material used: 75% cotton 25% linen
- Years of printing: 1861–present

Obverse
- Design: Benjamin Franklin's portrait by Joseph Duplessis, Declaration of Independence, quill pen, Syng inkwell, and an embedded image of the Liberty Bell
- Design date: 2009

Reverse
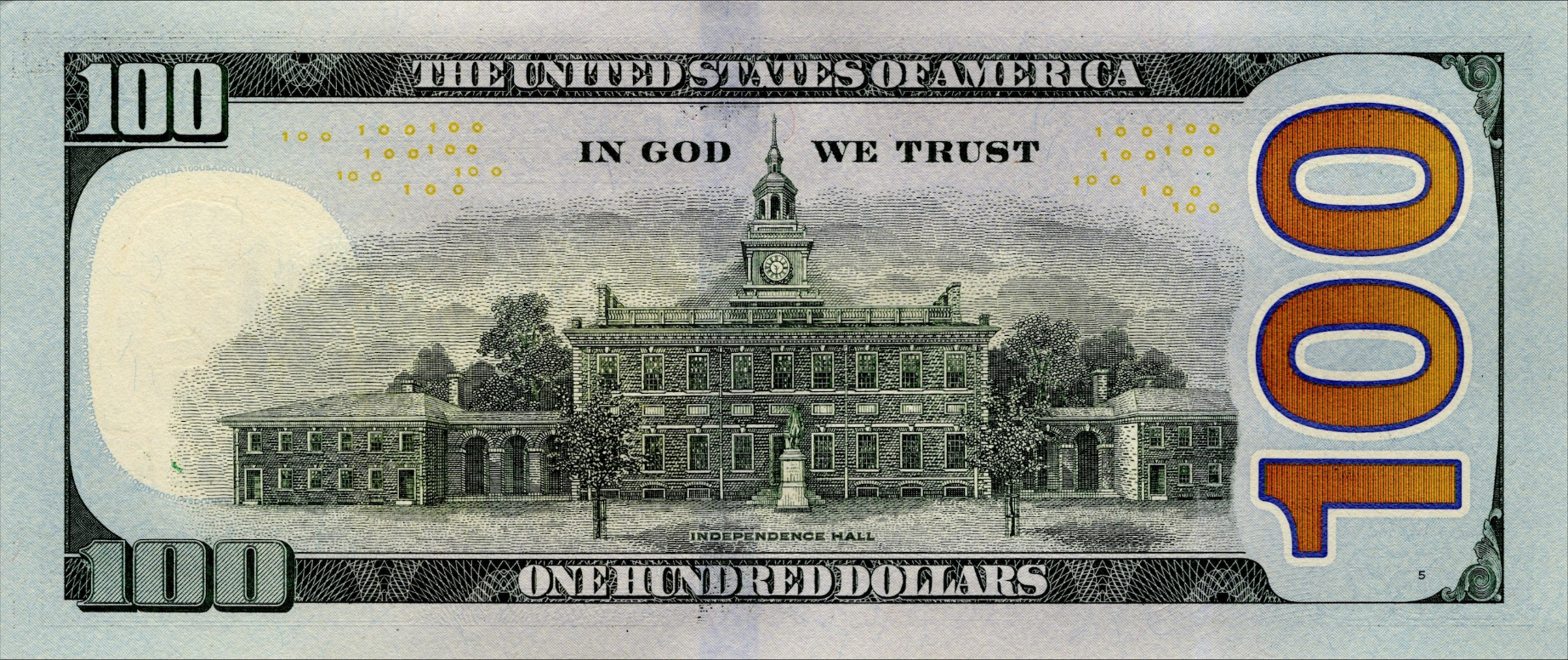
- Design: Independence Hall
- Design date: 2009

The United States one-hundred-dollar bill (US$100) is a denomination of United States currency. The first United States Note with this value was issued in 1862, and the Federal Reserve Note version was first produced in 1914. Inventor and U.S. Founding Father Benjamin Franklin has been featured on the obverse of the bill since 1914, which now also contains stylized images of the Declaration of Independence, a quill pen, the Syng inkwell, and the Liberty Bell. The reverse depicts Independence Hall in Philadelphia, Pennsylvania, which it has featured since 1928.

The $100 bill is the largest denomination that has been printed and circulated since July 13, 1969, when the larger denominations of $500, $1,000, $5,000, and $10,000 were retired. As of May 2025, the average life of a $100 bill in circulation is 24.0 years before it is replaced due to wear.

The bills are also informally referred to as "Benjamins", in reference to the use of Benjamin Franklin's portrait by the French painter Joseph Duplessis on the denomination, as "C-Notes" or "Century Notes", based on the Roman numeral for 100, or as "blue faces", based on the blue security features in the current design. The bill is one of two denominations printed today that does not feature a president of the United States, the other being the $10 bill, featuring Alexander Hamilton. The Series 2009 $100 bill redesign was unveiled on April 21, 2010, and was issued to the public on October 8, 2013. The new bill costs 12.5 cents to produce and has a blue ribbon woven into the center of the currency with "100" and Liberty Bells, alternating, that appear when the bill is tilted.

As of June 30, 2012, the $100 bill comprised 77% of all US currency in circulation. In 2024, $100 bills represented 82.46% of cash in circulation. Federal Reserve data from 2017 showed that the number of $100 bills exceeded the number of $1 bills. However, a 2018 research paper by the Federal Reserve Bank of Chicago estimated that 80 percent of $100 bills were in other countries. Possible reasons included $100 bills being used as a reserve currency against economic instability that affected other currencies, and use for criminal activities.

== History ==
=== Large-size notes ===
(approx. 7.4218 × 3.125 in ≈ 189 × 79 mm)

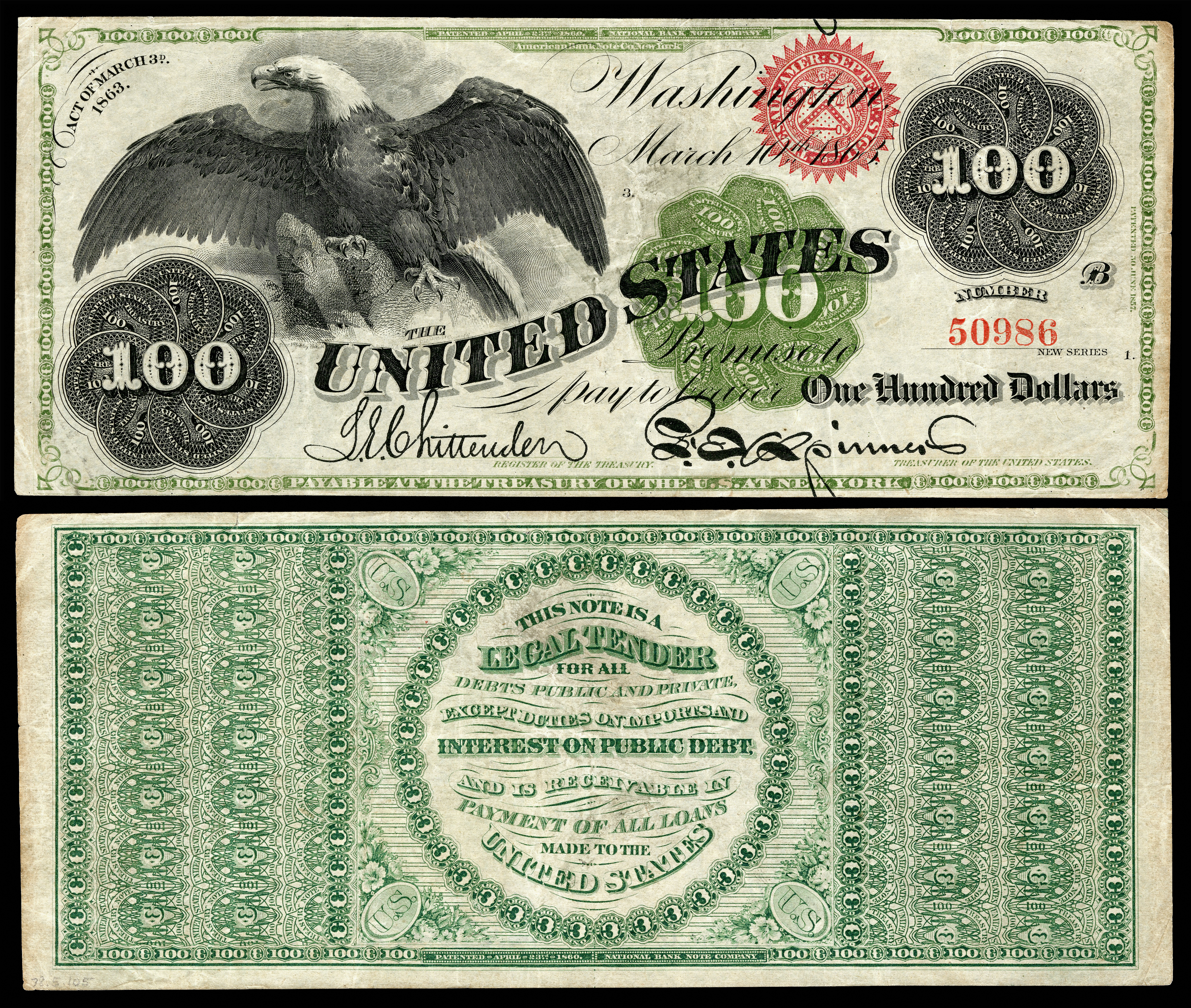
1863 $100 Legal Tender note The first $100 Gold Certificates were issued with a bald eagle to the left and large green 100 in the middle of the obverse.

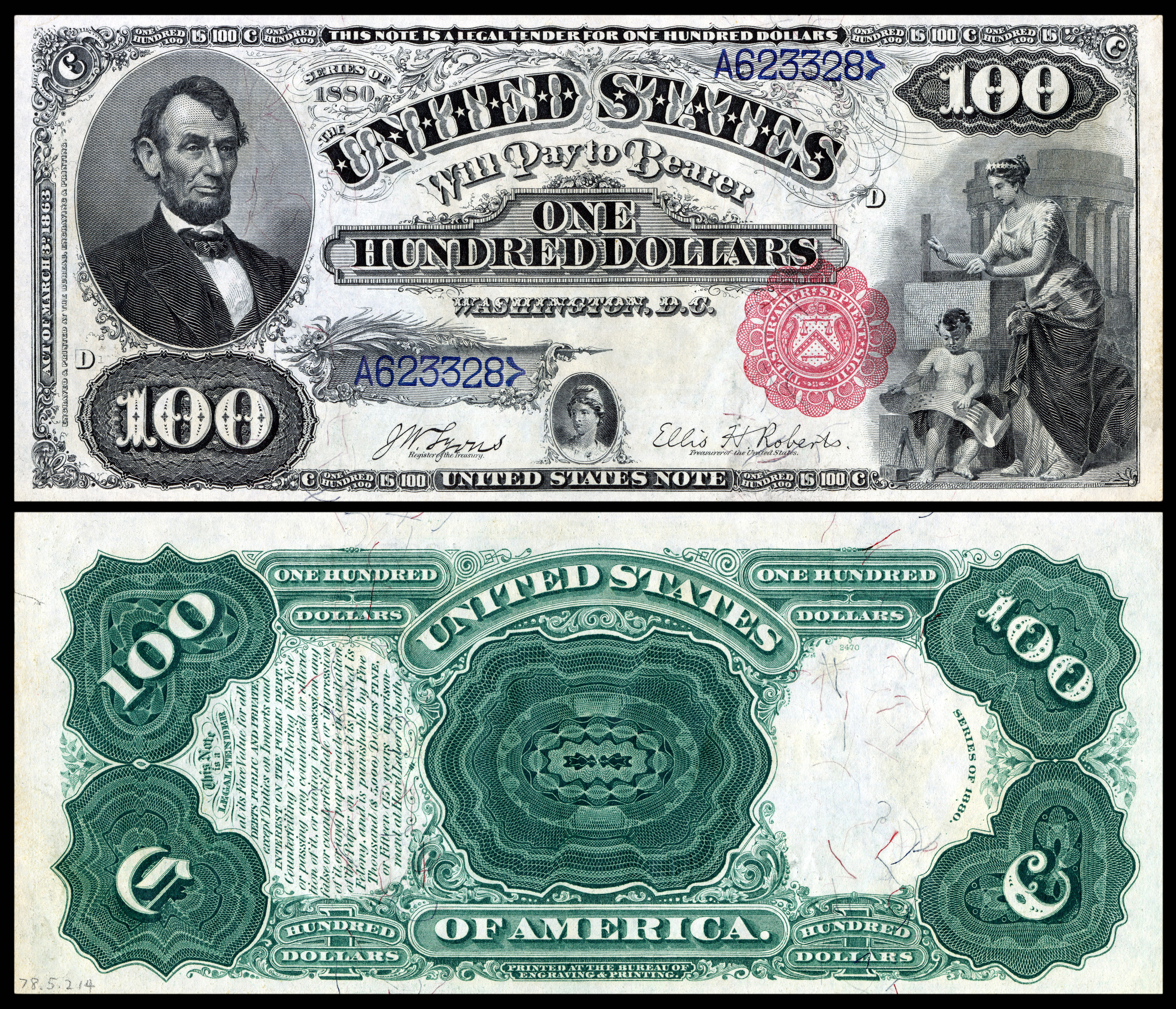
1880 $100 Legal Tender (1869 version) A new $100 United States Note was issued with a portrait of Abraham Lincoln on the left of the obverse and an allegorical figure representing architecture on the right.

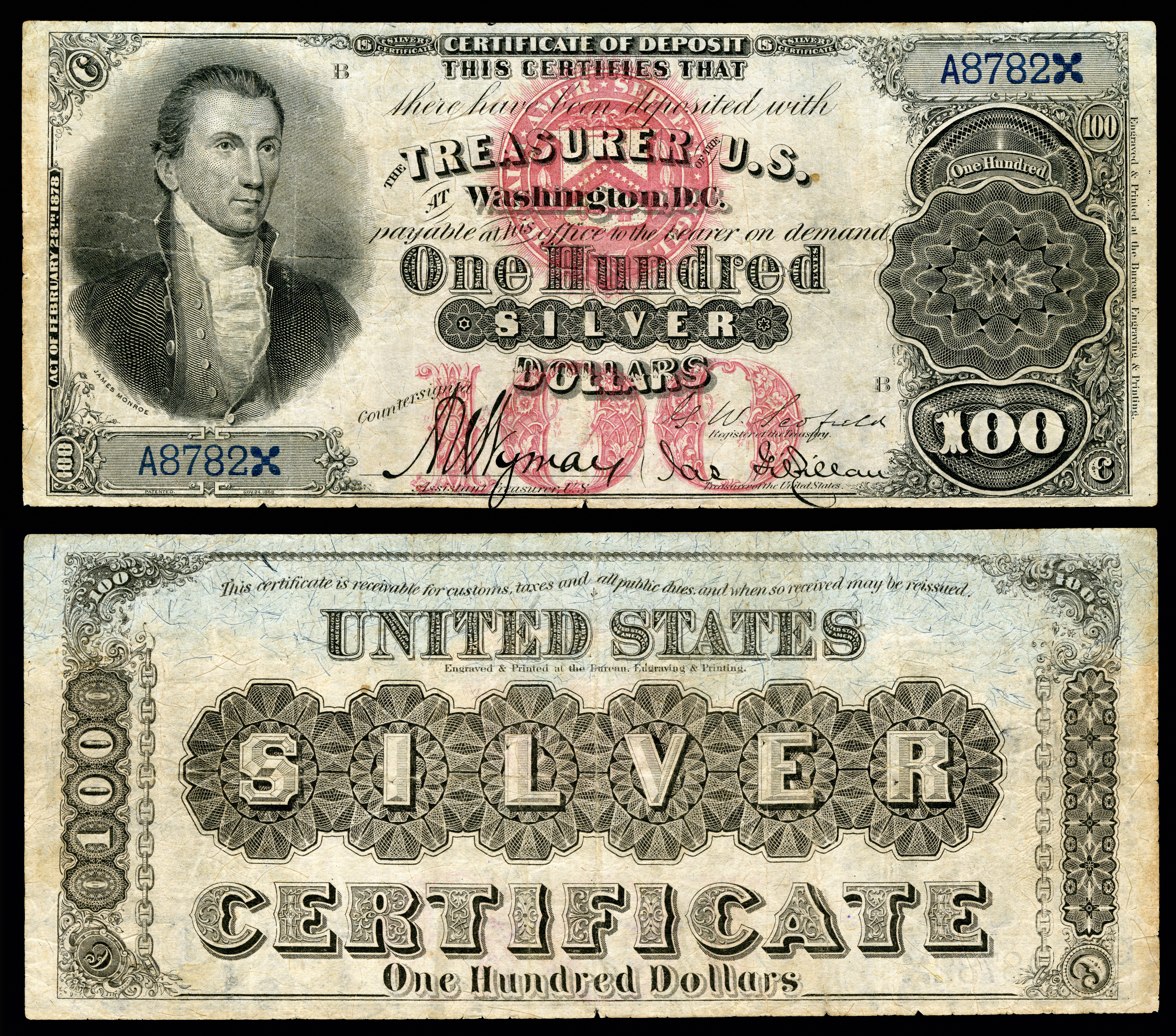
Series 1878 $100 silver certificate The first $100 silver certificate was issued with a portrait of James Monroe on the left side of the obverse.

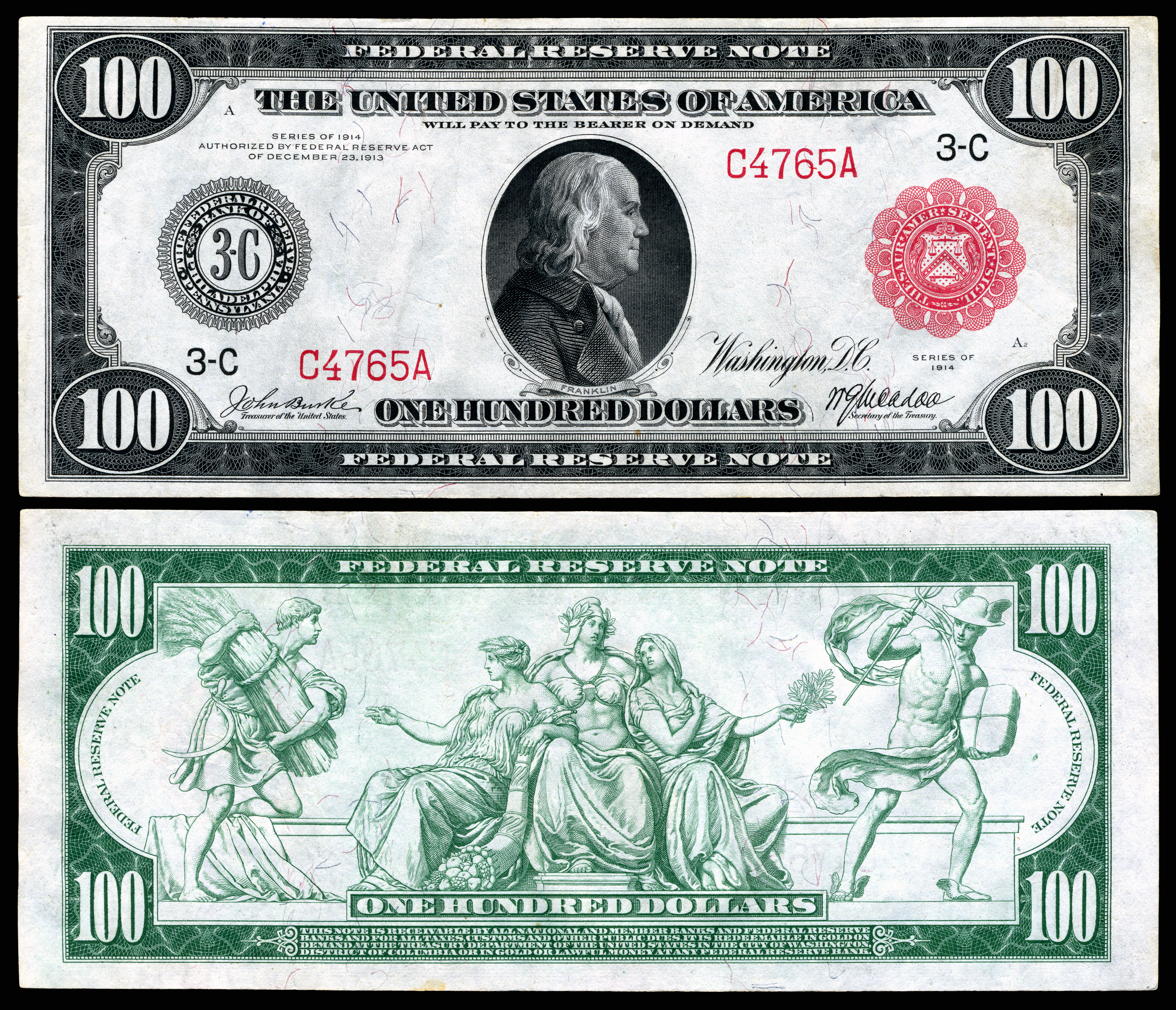
1914 $100 Federal Reserve Note The first $100 Federal Reserve Note was issued with a portrait of Benjamin Franklin on the obverse and allegorical figures representing labor, plenty, America, peace, and commerce on the reverse.

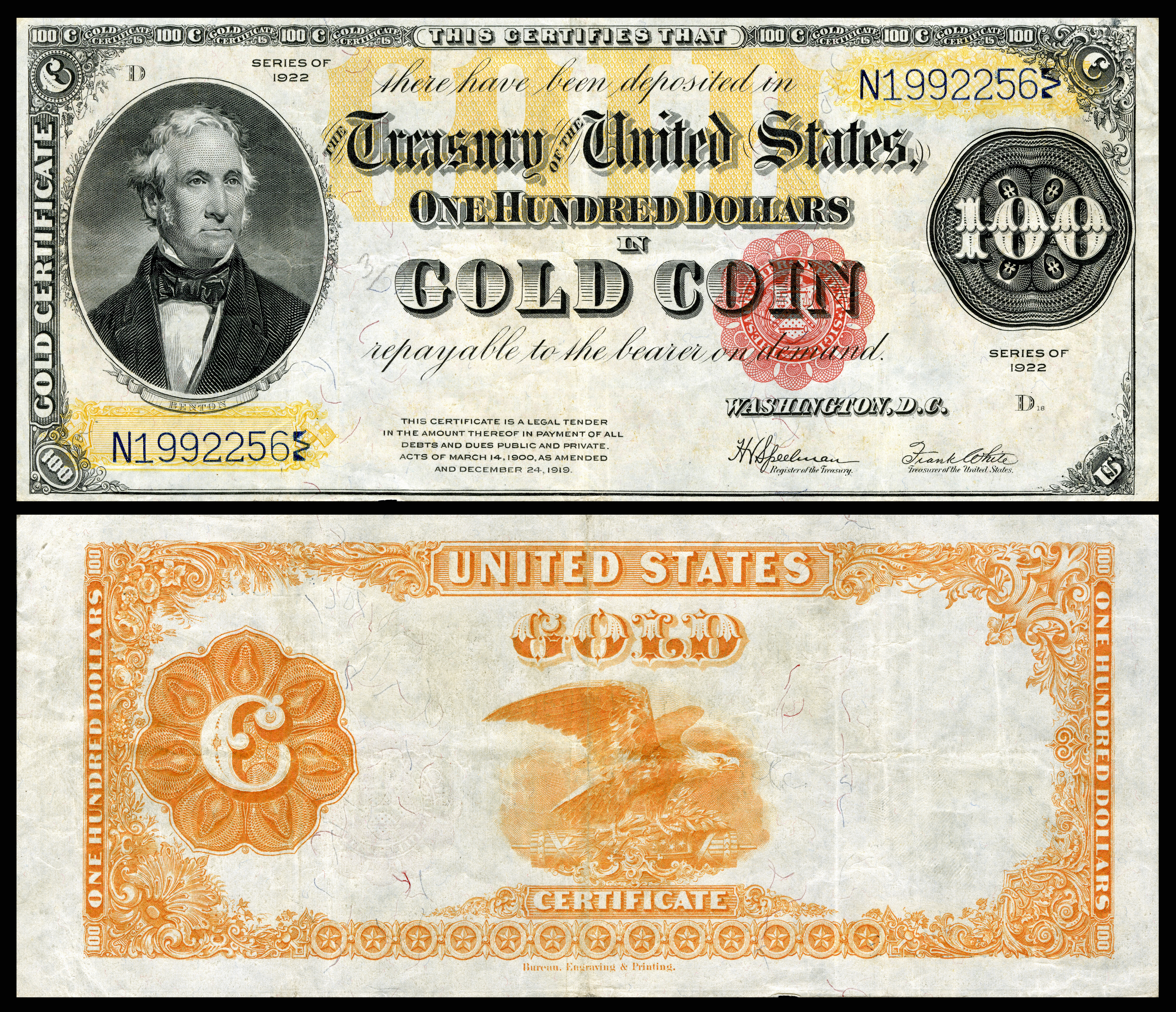
1922 $100 Gold Certificate The Series of 1880 Gold Certificate was re-issued with an obligation to the right of the bottom-left serial number on the obverse.
- 1861: Three-year $100 Interest Bearing Notes were issued that paid 7.3% interest per year. These notes were not primarily designed to circulate and were payable to the original purchaser of the dollar bill. The obverse of the note featured a portrait of General Winfield Scott.
- 1862: The first $100 United States Note was issued. Variations of this note were issued that resulted in slightly different wording (obligations) on the reverse; the note was issued again in Series of 1863.
- 1863: Both one and two and one half year Interest Bearing Notes were issued that paid 5% interest. The one-year Interest Bearing Notes featured a vignette of George Washington in the center, and allegorical figures representing "The Guardian" to the right and "Justice" to the left. The two-year notes featured a vignette of the U.S. treasury building in the center, a farmer and mechanic to the left, and sailors firing a cannon to the right.
- 1863: The first $100 Gold Certificates were issued with a bald eagle to the left and large green '100' in the middle of the obverse. The reverse was distinctly printed in orange instead of green like all other U.S. federal government issued notes of the time.
- 1864: Compound Interest Treasury Notes were issued that were intended to circulate for three years and paid 6% interest compounded semi-annually. The obverse is similar to the 1863 one-year Interest Bearing Note.
- 1869: A new $100 United States Note was issued with a portrait of Abraham Lincoln on the left of the obverse and an allegorical figure representing architecture on the right. Although this note is technically a United States Note, TREASURY NOTE appeared on it instead of UNITED STATES NOTE.
- 1870: A new $100 Gold Certificate with a portrait of Thomas Hart Benton on the left side of the obverse was issued. The note was one-sided.
- 1870: $100 National Gold Bank Notes were issued specifically for payment in gold coin by participating national gold banks. The obverse featured vignettes of Perry leaving the USS St. Lawrence and an allegorical figure to the right; the reverse featured a vignette of U.S. gold coins.
- 1875: The reverse of the Series of 1869 United States Note was redesigned. Also, TREASURY NOTE was changed to UNITED STATES NOTE on the obverse. This note was issued again in Series of 1878 and Series of 1880.
- 1878: The first $100 silver certificate was issued with a portrait of James Monroe on the left side of the obverse. The reverse was printed in black ink, unlike any other U.S. Federal Government issued bill.
- 1882: A new and revised $100 Gold Certificate was issued. The obverse was partially the same as the Series 1870 gold certificate; the border design, portrait of Thomas H. Benton, and large word GOLD, and gold-colored ink behind the serial numbers were all retained. The reverse featured a perched bald eagle and the Roman numeral for 100, C.
- 1890: $100 Treasury or "Coin Notes" were issued for government purchases of silver bullion from the silver mining industry. The note featured a portrait of Admiral David G. Farragut. The note was also nicknamed a "watermelon note" because of the watermelon-shaped 0's in the large numeral '100' on the reverse; the large numeral '100' was surrounded by an ornate design that occupied almost the entire note.
- 1891: The reverse of the Series of 1890 Treasury Note was redesigned because the Treasury felt that it was too "busy" which would make it too easy to counterfeit. More open space was incorporated into the new design.
- 1891: The obverse of the $100 Silver Certificate was slightly revised with some aspects of the design changed. The reverse was completely redesigned and also began to be printed in green ink.
- 1902: An extremely rare National Banknote was issued. It had a blue seal, and John J. Knox on the obverse, and two men and an eagle on top of a shield on the reverse.
- 1914: The first $100 Federal Reserve Note was issued with a portrait of Benjamin Franklin on the obverse and allegorical figures representing labor, plenty, America, peace, and commerce on the reverse.
- 1922: The Series of 1880 Gold Certificate was re-issued with an obligation to the right of the bottom-left serial number on the obverse.

=== Small size notes ===
(6.14 × 2.61 in ≅ 156 × 66 mm)

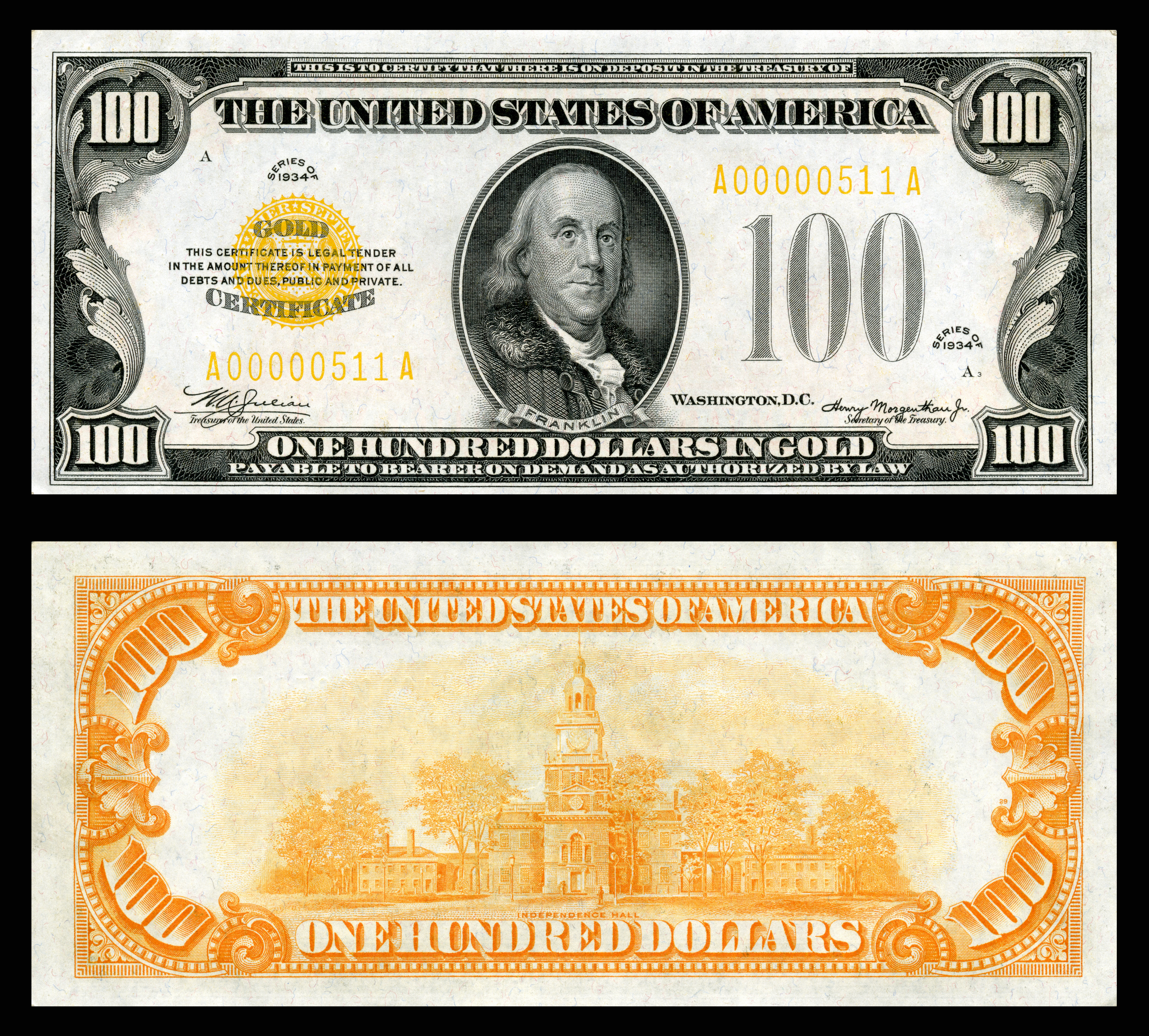
Both views (obverse and reverse) of the Series of 1934 $100 Gold Certificate

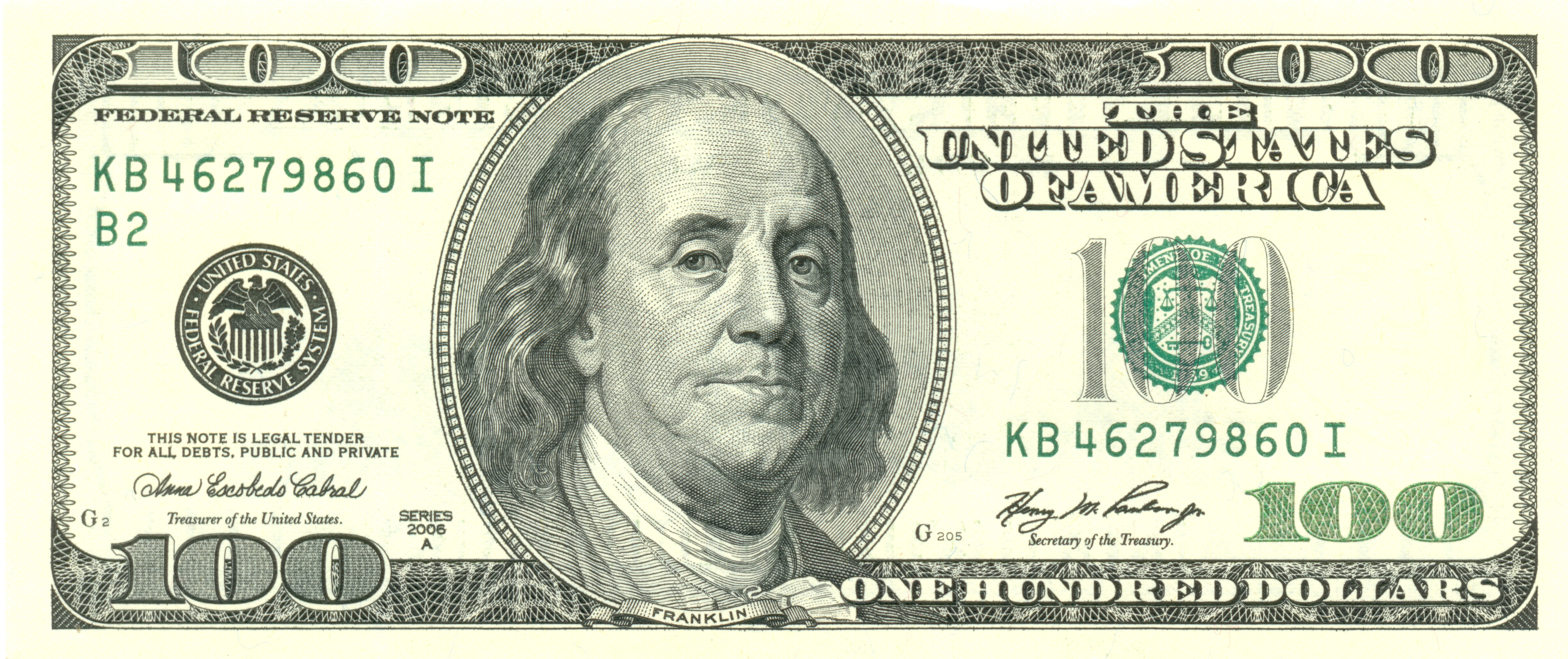
Obverse of a Series 2006A $100 note

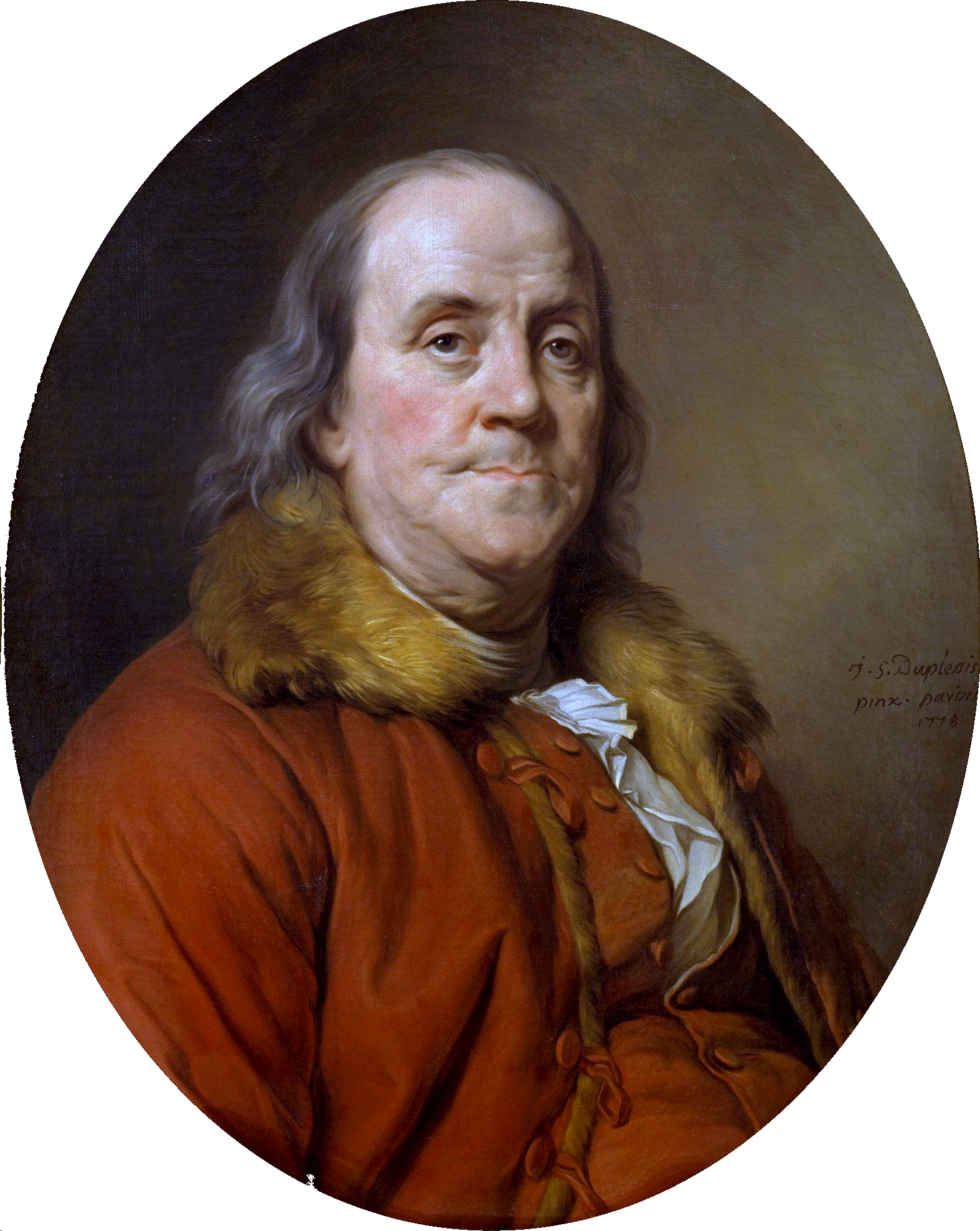
Joseph Duplessis portrait of Benjamin Franklin used on the $100 bill from Series 1928 until Series 1995

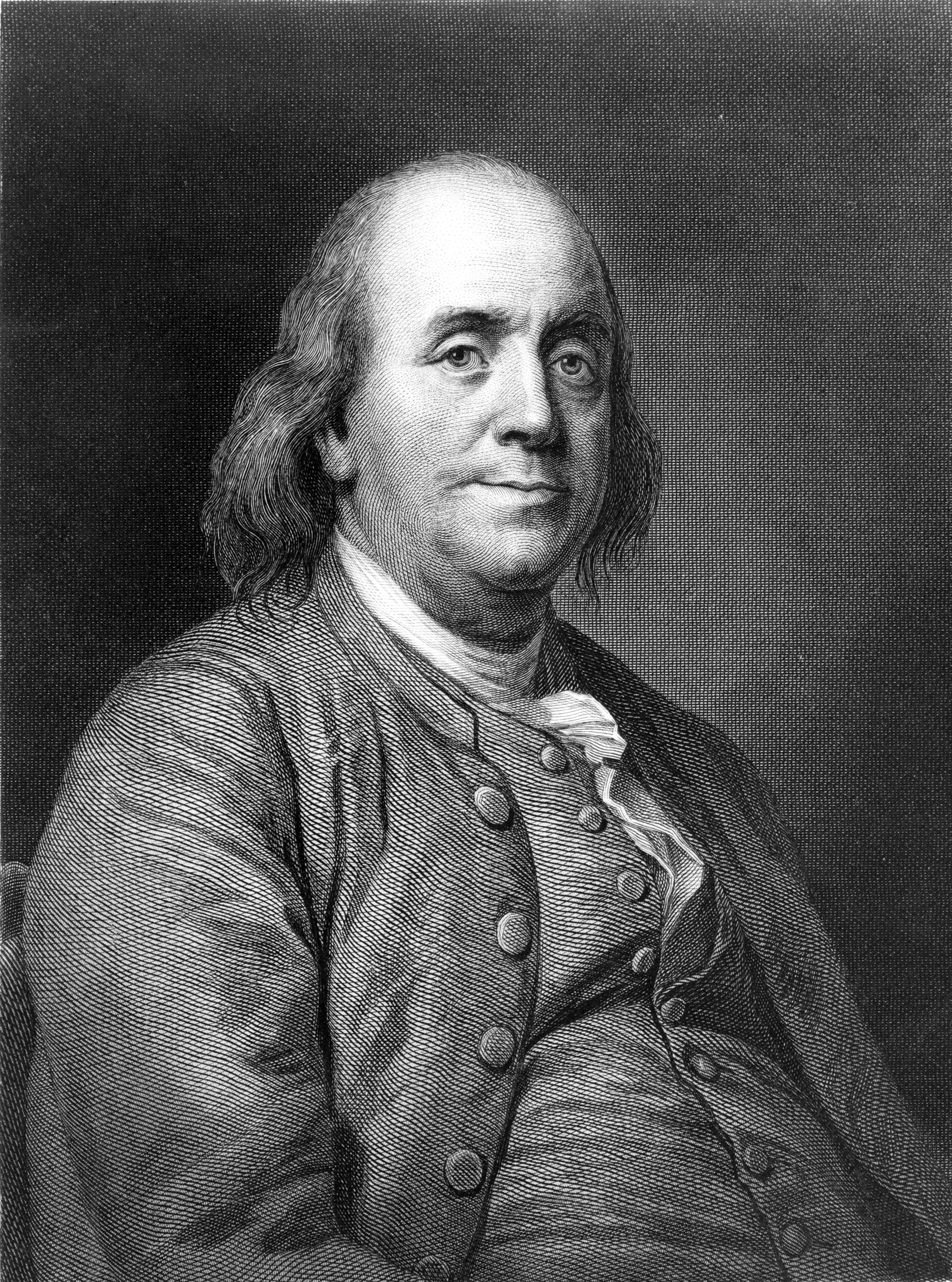
H. B. Hall engraving of Joseph Duplessis portrait of an older Benjamin Franklin used on the current $100 bill since Series 1996

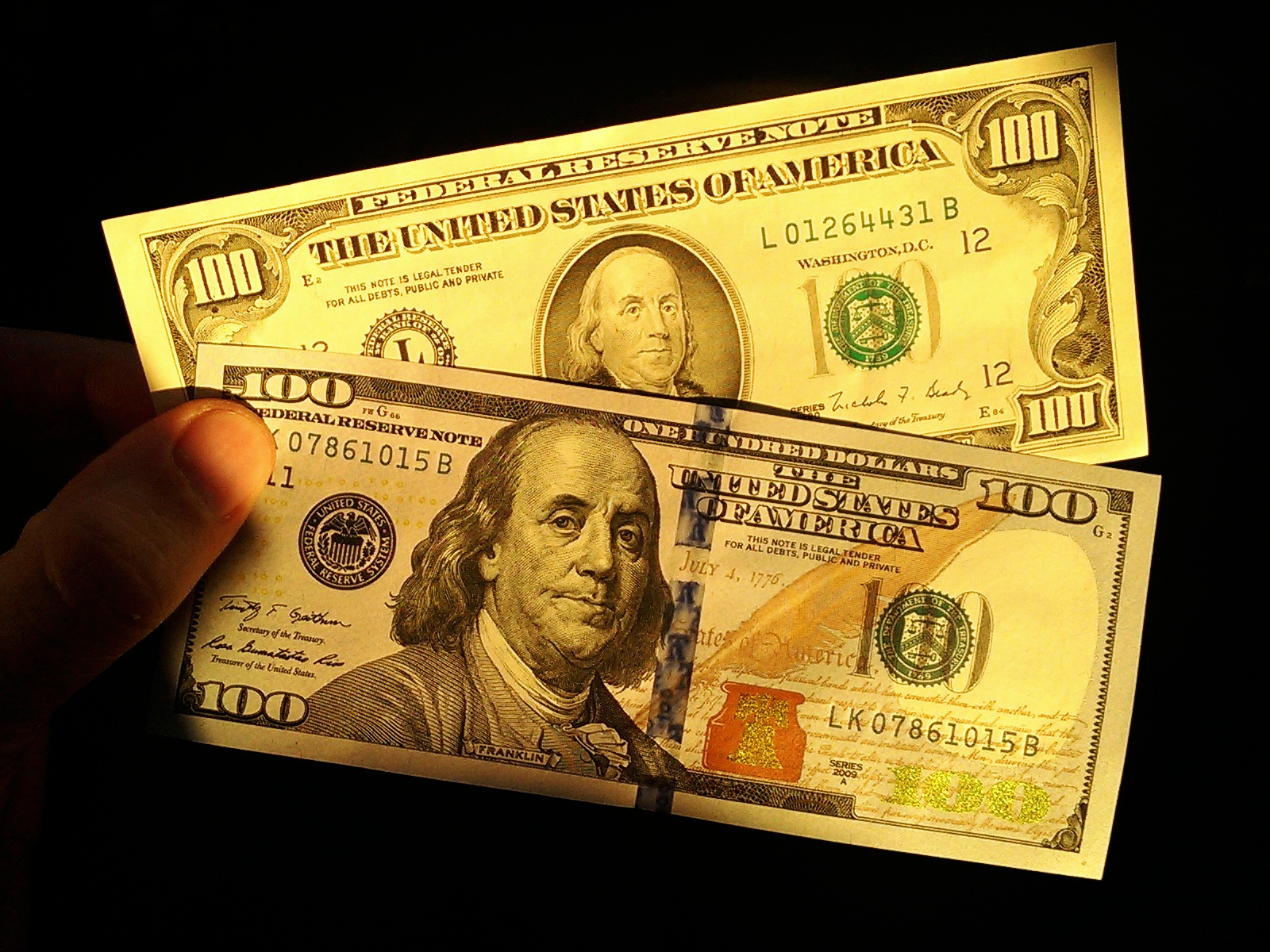
Comparison between a Series 1990 note and a Series 2009A note

Obverse of a Series 2025 $100 note (with the signature of the U.S. President Donald Trump)
- 1929: Under the Series of 1928, all U.S. currency was changed to its current size and began to carry a standardized design. All variations of the $100 bill would carry the same portrait of Benjamin Franklin, same border design on the obverse, and the same reverse with a vignette of Independence Hall. The $100 bill was issued as a Federal Reserve Note with a green seal and serial numbers and as a Gold Certificate with a golden seal and serial numbers.
- 1933: As an emergency response to the Great Depression, additional money was pumped into the American economy through Federal Reserve Bank Notes issued under Series of 1929. This was the only small-sized $100 bill that had a slightly different border design on the obverse. The serial numbers and seal on it were brown.
- 1934: The redeemable in gold clause was removed from Federal Reserve Notes due to the U.S. withdrawing from the gold standard.
- 1934: Special $100 Gold Certificates were issued for non-public, Federal Reserve bank-to-bank transactions. These notes featured a reverse printed in orange instead of green like all other small-sized notes. The wording on the obverse was also changed to ONE HUNDRED DOLLARS IN GOLD PAYABLE TO THE BEARER ON DEMAND AS AUTHORIZED BY LAW.
- 1950: Many minor aspects on the obverse of the $100 Federal Reserve Note were changed. Most noticeably, the treasury seal, gray numeral '100', and the Federal Reserve Seal were now smaller with small "spikes" added around the Federal Reserve seal, like the Treasury seal.
- 1963: Because dollar bills were no longer redeemable in silver, beginning with Series 1963A, WILL PAY TO THE BEARER ON DEMAND was removed from the obverse of the $100 Federal Reserve Note and the obligation was shortened to its current wording, THIS NOTE IS LEGAL TENDER FOR ALL DEBTS, PUBLIC AND PRIVATE. Also, IN GOD WE TRUST was added to the reverse.
- 1966: The first and only small-sized $100 United States Note was issued with a red seal and serial numbers. It was the first of all United States currency to use the new U.S. treasury seal with wording in English instead of Latin. Like the Series 1963 $2 and $5 United States Notes, it lacked WILL PAY TO THE BEARER ON DEMAND on the obverse and featured the motto IN GOD WE TRUST on the reverse. The $100 United States Note was issued due to legislation that specified a certain dollar amount of United States Notes that were to remain in circulation. Because the $2 and $5 United States Notes were soon to be discontinued, the dollar amount of United States Notes would drop, thus warranting the issuing of this note. $100 United States Notes were last printed in 1969 and last issued in 1971.
- 1990: The first new-age anti-counterfeiting measures were introduced under Series 1990 with microscopic printing around Franklin's portrait and a metallic security strip on the left side of the bill.
- March 25, 1996: The first major design change of the $100 note since 1929 took place with the adoption of a contemporary style layout. The main intent of the new design was to deter counterfeiting, which had become more rampant following the rise of computer printing and image scanning technology. New security features included a watermark of Franklin to the right side of the bill, optically variable ink (OVI) that changed from green to black when viewed at different angles on the lower right corner '100', an enlarged and different portrait of Franklin, and hard-to-reproduce fine line printing around Franklin's portrait and Independence Hall. Older security features such as interwoven red and blue silk fibers, microprinting, and a plastic security thread (which now glows pink [nominally red] under a black light) were kept. The individual Federal Reserve Bank Seal with district letter was changed to a unified Federal Reserve System Seal along with an additional prefix letter being added to the serial number, w. The first of the Series 1996 bills were produced in October 1995.
- February 2007: The first $100 bills (a shipment of 128,000 star notes from the San Francisco FRB) from the Western Currency Facility in Fort Worth, Texas, were produced, almost 16 years after the first notes from the facility were produced. The shipment makes the $100 bill the most recently added production to the facility's lineup. 4.6 billion notes were produced at the facility with Series 2006 and Cabral and Paulson signatures, including about 4.15 million star notes.
- October 8, 2013: The newest $100 bill was announced on April 21, 2010, and, because of printing problems, did not enter circulation until nearly three and a half years later, on October 8, 2013. In addition to design changes introduced in 1996, the obverse features the brown quill that was used to sign the Declaration of Independence; faint phrases from the Declaration of Independence; the Syng inkstand's inkwell; a bell within the inkwell's image that appears and disappears depending on the angle at which the bill is viewed using optically variable ink (OVI) and changes from copper to green; teal background color; a borderless portrait of Benjamin Franklin; a blue "3D security ribbon" (trademarked "Motion" by Crane Currency) on which images of Liberty Bells shift into numerical designations of '100' as the note is tilted; and to the left of Franklin, small yellow '100's whose zeros form the EURion constellation. The reverse features a large gradient '100' printed vertically on the right side, small yellow EURion '100's and has the fine lines removed from around the vignette of Independence Hall. These notes were issued as Series 2009A with Rios-Geithner signatures. Many of these changes are intended not only to thwart counterfeiting but to also make it easier to quickly check authenticity and help vision-impaired people. The first of the Series 2009 bills were produced in February 2010 while the Series 2009A replacement banknote was first produced in September 2011.
- July 5, 2026: U.S. President Donald Trump posted a new image of the $100 bill featuring his signature on the social media site Truth Social, months after the Treasury Department announced that the signature of a sitting president would appear on U.S. paper money for the first time ahead of the United States Semiquincentennial.

=== Series dates ===
==== Small size ====
Type	Series	Register	Treasurer	Seal
National Bank Note Types 1 & 2	1929	Jones	Woods	Brown
Federal Reserve Bank Note	1928A	Jones	Woods	Brown

Type	Series	Secretary	Treasurer	Seal
Gold Certificate	1928	Mellon	Woods	Gold
Gold Certificate	1934	Morgenthau	Julian	Gold
United States Note	1966	Fowler	Granahan	Red
United States Note	1966A	Kennedy	Elston	Red
Federal Reserve Note	1928	Mellon	Woods	Green
Federal Reserve Note	1928A	Mellon	Woods	Green
Federal Reserve Note	1934	Morgenthau	Julian	Green
Federal Reserve Note	1934A	Morgenthau	Julian	Green
Federal Reserve Note	1934B	Vinson	Julian	Green
Federal Reserve Note	1934C	Snyder	Julian	Green
Federal Reserve Note	1934D	Snyder	Clark	Green
Federal Reserve Note	1950	Snyder	Clark	Green
Federal Reserve Note	1950A	Humphrey	Priest	Green
Federal Reserve Note	1950B	Anderson	Priest	Green
Federal Reserve Note	1950C	Dillon	Smith	Green
Federal Reserve Note	1950D	Dillon	Granahan	Green
Federal Reserve Note	1950E	Fowler	Granahan	Green
Federal Reserve Note	1963A	Fowler	Granahan	Green
Federal Reserve Note	1969	Kennedy	Elston	Green
Federal Reserve Note	1969A	Kennedy	Kabis	Green
Federal Reserve Note	1969B	Connally	Kabis	Green
Federal Reserve Note	1969C	Shultz	Bañuelos	Green
Federal Reserve Note	1974	Simon	Neff	Green
Federal Reserve Note	1977	Blumenthal	Morton	Green
Federal Reserve Note	1981	Regan	Buchanan	Green
Federal Reserve Note	1981A	Regan	Ortega	Green
Federal Reserve Note	1985	Baker	Ortega	Green
Federal Reserve Note	1988	Brady	Ortega	Green
Federal Reserve Note	1990	Brady	Villalpando	Green
Federal Reserve Note	1993	Bentsen	Withrow	Green
Federal Reserve Note	1996	Rubin	Withrow	Green
Federal Reserve Note	1999	Summers	Withrow	Green
Federal Reserve Note	2001	O'Neill	Marin	Green
Federal Reserve Note	2003	Snow	Marin	Green
Federal Reserve Note	2003A	Snow	Cabral	Green
Federal Reserve Note	2006	Paulson	Cabral	Green
Federal Reserve Note	2006A	Paulson	Cabral	Green
Federal Reserve Note	2009	Geithner	Rios	Green
Federal Reserve Note	2009A	Geithner	Rios	Green
Federal Reserve Note	2013	Lew	Rios	Green
Federal Reserve Note	2017A	Mnuchin	Carranza	Green
Federal Reserve Note	2021	Yellen	Malerba	Green
Federal Reserve Note	2025	Bessent		Green

== Withdrawal of large denomination bills ($500 and up) ==
On July 14, 1969, the Federal Reserve announced that the large denominations of United States currency would be withdrawn from circulation; banks were instructed to return any notes received or deposited larger than $100 to the United States Treasury. While the larger denominations remained legal tender, with their removal, the $100 note was the largest denomination remaining in circulation. All the Federal Reserve Notes produced from Series 1928 up to before Series 1969 (i.e. 1928, 1928A, 1934, 1934A, 1934B, 1934C, 1934D, 1950, 1950A, 1950B, 1950C, 1950D, 1950E, 1963, 1966, 1966A) of the $100 denomination added up to $23.1708 billion. Since some banknotes had been destroyed, and the population was 200 million at the time, there was less than one $100 banknote per capita circulating.

As of June 30, 1969, the U.S. coins and banknotes in circulation of all denominations were worth $50.936 billion of which $4.929 billion was circulating overseas. The currency and coin circulating within the United States was $230 per capita. Since 1969, the demand for U.S. currency has greatly increased. The total amount of circulating currency and coin passed one trillion dollars in March 2011.

Despite the degradation in the value of the U.S. $100 banknote (which was worth about $877.95 in 1969), and despite competition from some more valuable foreign notes (most notably, the 500 euro banknote), there are no current plans to re-issue banknotes above $100. Today's widespread use of electronic means to conduct high-value transactions has made large-scale physical cash transactions for legitimate business unnecessary from the government's point of view. Quoting T. Allison, Assistant to the Board of the Federal Reserve System in his October 8, 1998, testimony before the U.S. House of Representatives, Subcommittee on Domestic and International Monetary Policy, Committee on Banking and Financial Services:

There are public policies against reissuing the $500 note, mainly because many of those efficiency gains, such as lower shipment and storage costs, would accrue not only to legitimate users of bank notes but also to money launderers, tax evaders and a variety of other lawbreakers who use currency in their criminal activity. While it is not at all clear that the volume of illegal drugs sold or the amount of tax evasion would necessarily increase just as a consequence of the availability of a larger dollar denomination bill, it no doubt is the case that if wrongdoers were provided with an easier mechanism to launder their funds and hide their profits, enforcement authorities could have a harder time detecting certain illicit transactions occurring in cash.
