= Philip Syng =

American silversmith

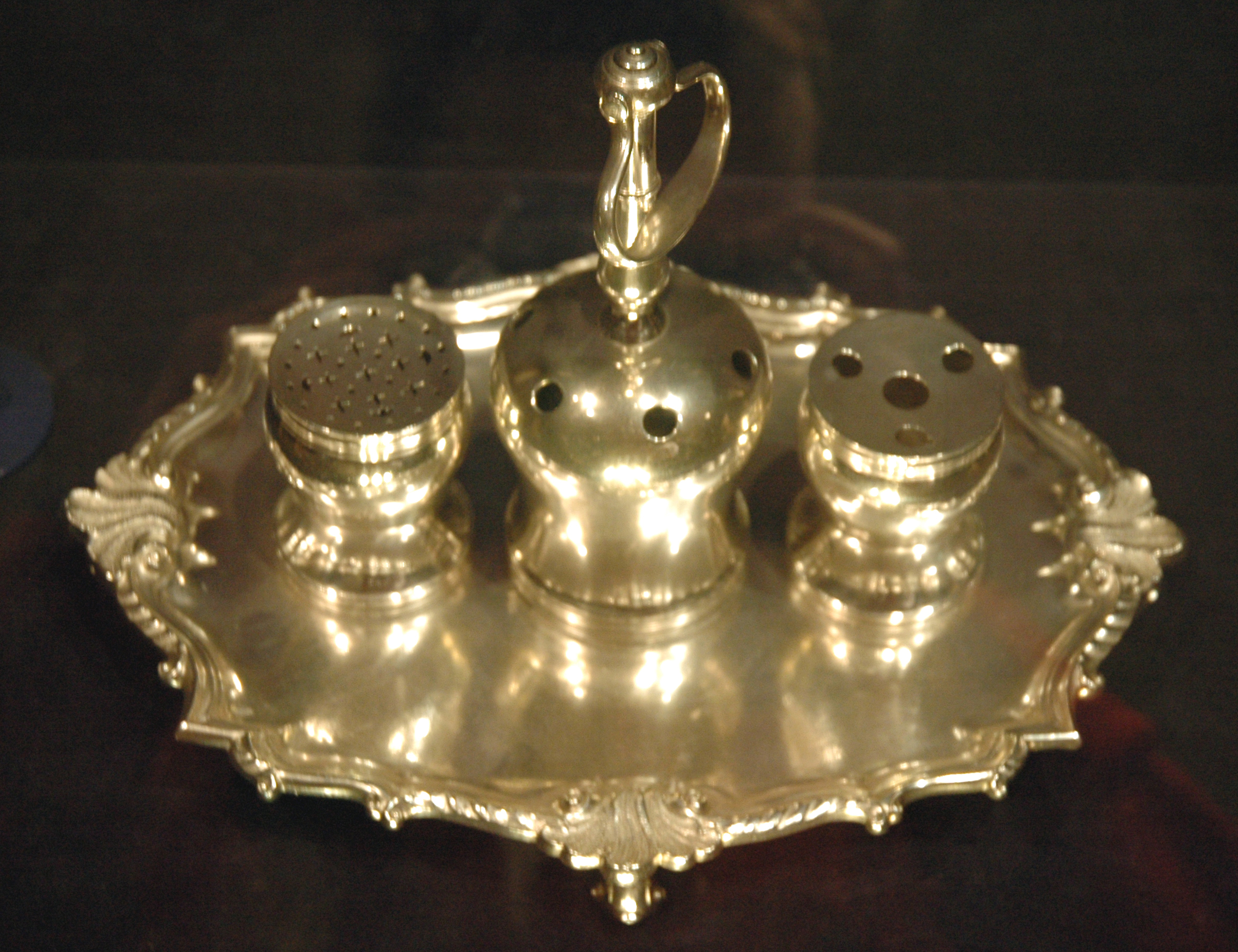
America's Founding Fathers used the "Syng inkstand" to sign the Declaration of Independence in 1776 and the United States Constitution in 1787.

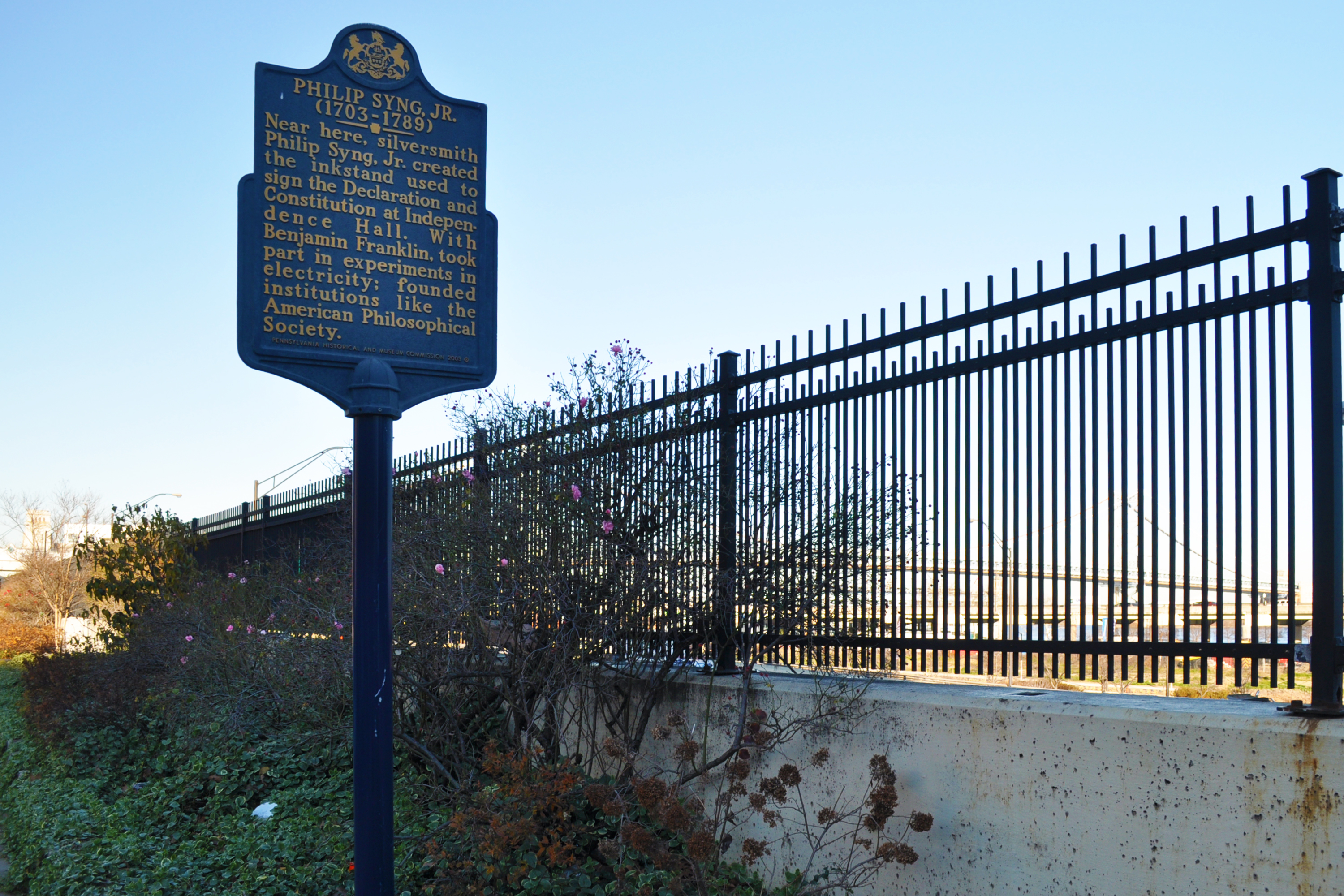
Philip Syng Jr. historical marker at S. Front near Market Sts. Philadelphia PA

Philip Syng (September 29, 1703 – May 8, 1789) was, like his namesake father, Philip Syng, Sr. (1676–1739), a renowned silversmith who created fine works in silver and sometimes gold for the wealthy families of Philadelphia, Pennsylvania. In 1752 he created the Syng inkstand, which was used to sign the 1776 United States Declaration of Independence and the United States Constitution in 1787.

A member of the St. John's Lodge of Freemasons in Philadelphia, he served as the Grand Master of the Grand Lodge of Pennsylvania in 1741.

== Biography ==
Philip Syng was born in Cork, Ireland, to Philip Syng, a silversmith by trade, and Abigail Murdock Syng. In 1714 the Syng family emigrated to the United States staying first in Annapolis, Maryland, and then moving to Philadelphia. Philip Syng, Sr. trained all three of his sons as silversmiths.

Besides becoming one of the highly-sought Philadelphia silversmiths, Philip Syng, Jr. was a member of Benjamin Franklin's Junto, and was a founder of the Library Company of Philadelphia, the Union Fire Company, Philadelphia Contributionship, Pennsylvania Hospital, and the American Philosophical Society. He was a founding trustee of the academy and College of Philadelphia (now the University of Pennsylvania), serving from 1749 to 1773. Syng was also elected to various public offices including city assessor, warden of the port, and treasurer of the city and county of Philadelphia. Benjamin Franklin considered Syng a "worthy and ingenious friend."

Syng married Elizabeth Warner in Christ Church, Philadelphia in 1730 and they had 18 children. One of his daughters, Abigail, was the mother of Philadelphia physician Philip Syng Physick.

He died in Philadelphia in 1789, and is buried at Christ Church Burial Ground. According to the Grove Encyclopedia of American Art, Philip Syng, Sr., and Philip Syng, Jr., are both listed among the major silver makers of the 18th century in America.
