= Oh Yeon-ho =

Korean journalist (born 1964)

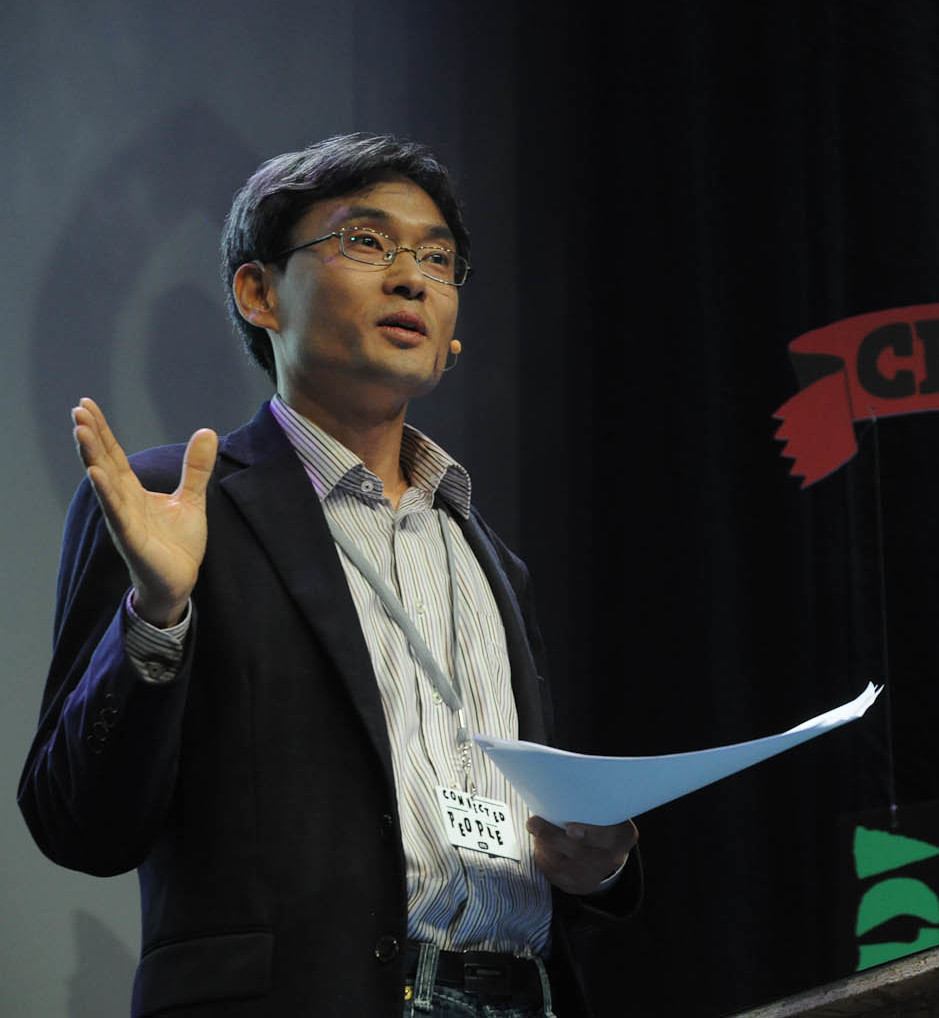
- Oh Yeon-ho, 2010
- Born: 18 September 1964 (age 61); Gokseong, South Korea
- Education: Yonsei University; Regent University; Sogang University
- Occupations: Journalist, educator
- Title: CEO and managing editor of OhmyNews; Chairperson of Korea Internet Newspaper Association

Korean name
- Hangul: 오연호
- RR: O Yeonho
- MR: O Yŏnho

Oh Yeon-ho (born 18 September 1964) is the founder of "citizen journalism" in South Korea, and CEO of OhmyNews a new approach to cyber-journalism in which ordinary citizens can contribute to a major news organization through being at news events, filing reports, and having their work verified and edited by trained news staff. He is seen as one of the pivotal figures in the contemporary culture of South Korea.

== Biography ==
Oh was born in 1964 in Gokseong. He graduated from Yonsei University in 1988 with a degree in Korean literature. He earned a master's degree in journalism from Regent University in 1998 and has a PhD in mass-communication at Sogang University in Seoul. In 2006, he received the Wharton Infosys Business Transformation Award for his work with information technology, most specifically his pioneering development of OhmyNews and the society-transforming contributions that resulted.

== Media career ==
- 1988–1999 Reporter, Chief Reporter in Monthly magazine Mahl
- 1995–1997 Correspondent in Washington, DC in Monthly magazine Mahl
- 22 Feb 2000 Founded OhmyNews, served as CEO and managing editor
- 2007–2009 President of Korea Internet Newspaper Association

== Awards ==
- May 2001 Awarded: The Media Grand Prize of This Year
- October 2001 Selection: 55 people of South Korea
- December 2001 Winning the Grand prize: Democratic Press Award
- October 2004 Winning the Grand prize: Ahn Jong-Pil Press Award
- January 2006 Awarded: Management Innovation
- October 2007 Awarded: Medal of Missouri University
- October 2018 Awarded: Grundtvig Prize 2018
- Ranked 16th in 'This year's 50s for IT characters' as UK Information Technology site (www.silicon.com)

== See also ==
- Citizen journalism
- Independent Media Center
- Ohmynews
