= Oh Joo-yeon =

South Korean voice actress

Oh Joo-yeon (Korean: 오주연) is a South Korean voice actress who joined the Munhwa Broadcasting Corporation's voice acting division in 1997.

== Roles ==
=== Broadcast TV ===
- Ojamajo Doremi (Magical Remi from 1st - 3rd Series, Korea TV Edition, MBC and TV Special of Korea Edition, Tooniverse)
- Fairy Pipi (Korea TV Edition, MBC)
- Bikkuriman (Bumerang Fighter, Korea TV Edition, MBC)
- Fruits Basket (Korea TV Edition, MBC and Tooniverse)
- Tori Go! Go! (KBS)

=== Film dubbing ===
- The Others (replacing Alakina Mann, Korea TV Edition, MBC)

== See also ==
- Munhwa Broadcasting Corporation
- MBC Voice Acting Division

== Homepage ==
- MBC Voice Acting division Oh Joo-yeon blog (in Korean)
