= O Jung-hup =

Korean military officer (1910–1939)

- Portrait of O Jung-hup

Korean name
- Hangul: 오중흡
- Hanja: 吳仲洽
- RR: O Jungheup
- MR: O Chunghŭp

O Jung-hup (10 July 1910 – 17 December 1939) was a Korean military officer who fought the Japanese with Kim Il Sung.

O was born into a poor family in Seson-ri, Onsong County of North Hamgyong Province, on 10 July 1910. Leading the 7th Regiment of the Korean People's Revolutionary Army, he was killed in action during the Liukesong battle in Dunhua County on 17 December 1939, aged 29.

== Family ==
The O family are influential in the North Korean regime. As of 2012, his nephew O Kuk-ryol was vice-chairman of the National Defense Commission of the DPRK.

O family

?
O Jung-song	O Jung-hup (1910–1939)
O Kuk-ryol (1930–2023)
O Hye-young (1956–)	O Hyon-ok (1958–)	O Young-ae (1960–)	O Se-uk (1962–)	O Hye-sun (1965–)	O Young-ran	O Se-won	So Ho-won (in-law)

== Legacy ==
In North Korea, "O Jung-hup 7th Regiment" (오중흡7련대) is an honorific title used to award some elite units of the Korean People's Army.
