= Hamyang O clan =

Korean clan from South Gyeongsang Province

- Country: Korea
- Current region: Hamyang County
- Founder: O Gwang hwi

Hamyang O clan (Korean: 함양 오씨; Hanja: 咸陽 吳氏) was one of the Korean clans. Their Bon-gwan was in Hamyang County, South Gyeongsang Province. According to the research in 2015, the number of Hamyang O clan was 35846. Their founder was O Gwang-hwi (Korean: 오광휘; Hanja: 呉光輝) who became the governor of Hamyang County in Goreyo for defeating the Khitan people.
