= Dongbok O clan =

Korean clan from South Jeolla Province

- Country: Korea
- Current region: Hwasun County
- Founder: O Hyeon jwa
- Connected members: Oh Kwang-rok
- Website: http://www.dongbokoh.net/

Dongbok O clan (Korean: 동복 오씨; Hanja: 同福 吳氏) was one of the Korean clans. Their Bon-gwan was in Hwasun County, South Jeolla Province. According to the research in 2015, the number of Dongbok O clan was 72394. Their founder was (Korean: 오현좌; Hanja: 呉賢佐). He was appointed as the governor of Dongbok County, which was renamed Hwansun in later era, during the King Gojong of Goryeo's reign in Goryeo dynasty and began Dongbok O clan.
