= Boseong O clan =

Korean clan from South Jeolla Province

- Country: Korea
- Current region: Boseong County
- Founder: O Hyeon pil

Boseong O clan (Korean: 보성 오씨; Hanja: 寶城 吳氏) was one of the Korean clans. Their Bon-gwan was in Boseong County, South Jeolla Province. According to the research in 2015, the number of Boseong O clan was 71162. Their founder was O Hyeon-pil (Korean: 오현필; Hanja: 寶城 吳氏). He was appointed as the governor of Boseong county for protecting Goryeo from the Kitan in 1216.
