= Cho Sik =

Korean philosopher (1501–1572)

- Hangul: 조식
- Hanja: 曺植
- RR: Jo Sik
- MR: Cho Sik

Art name
- Hangul: 남명
- Hanja: 南冥
- RR: Nammyeong
- MR: Nammyŏng

Courtesy name
- Hangul: 건중
- Hanja: 楗仲
- RR: Geonjung
- MR: Kŏnjung

Posthumous name
- Hangul: 문정
- Hanja: 文貞
- RR: Munjeong
- MR: Munjŏng

Cho Sik (Korean: 조식; Hanja: 曺植; July 10, 1501 – February 21, 1572) was a Korean philosopher, poet, and politician during the Joseon period. He was a Neo-Confucian scholar who had a major influence on the Northerners in the Joseon Dynasty factional politics.

== Biography ==
Cho Sik was born in Samga-hyeon, Gyeongsang Province (present-day Samga-myeon, Hapcheon-gun, Gyeongsangnam-do) in 1501 and died in 1572. After failing the civil service examination at the late age of 37, he lived as a hermit, devoting himself to scholarly research and teaching disciples. As his scholarly reputation grew, he was repeatedly recommended for government posts, but he declined all offers. Instead, he frequently submitted petitions criticizing the abuses and corruption stemming from the king's relatives' political maneuvering and demanding reforms.

His disciples; including Jeong In-hong, Choi Yeong-gyeong, and Jeong Gu; formed the Nammyeong School (남명학파; 南冥學派), which became the core of the Northern faction during the reign of King Gwanghaegun. The Nammyeong School strove to implement Cho's scholarly emphasis on practical application in real-world politics.

Alongside Yi Hwang (1501–1570), they are regarded as forming the twin pillars of Joseon Neo-Confucianism (성리학; 性理學) in the southern province. In contrast, Yi Hwang's disciples became deeply immersed in the theory of li and qi (이기론; 理氣論) in Neo-Confucianism.

=== Early life ===
Cho Sik's courtesy name was Geonjung (건중; 楗仲 meaning 'strong and upright'), and his art name was Nammyeong (남명; 南冥 meaning 'southern sea'). His father, Cho Ŏnhyŏng (조언형; 曺彦亨), was an officer at the Office of Foreign Affairs Documents (승문원; 承文院), and his mother was Lady Yi, daughter of Yi Guk, a prominent figure in the Sancheong region, from the Incheon Yi clan.

Born in 1501 in Togol, Samga County, Gyeongsang Province, he moved to Seoul with his father between the ages of four and seven. He subsequently travelled to various regions following his father's postings, primarily residing in Seoul until his mid-twenties.

During this time, he formed a close friendship with the neighbouring brothers Yi Yun-gyeong and Yi Jun-gyeong, who would later become high-ranking officials. They studied under the same teacher. At the age of 18, he moved to the foot of Mt. Bukaksan and formed a lifelong friendship with Seong Un. He was deeply upset by the execution of Cho Kwangjo (1482–1520) during the Third Literati Purge of 1519 (기묘사화; 己卯士禍) and the exile of his uncle, Cho Yeon-gyeong.

For the next seven to eight years, he devoted himself to reading at a temple near Seoul and took the civil service examinations. He passed the preliminary examination at the age of 22, but failed the final examination. At 26, he mourned his father's death and returned to his hometown. After completing the three-year mourning period, he continued to read Chinese classics and enjoyed making friends and engaging in discussions on Neo-Confucianism. His wife's family were renowned as wealthy landowners in Gimhae. With their support, he achieved financial stability, enabling him to devote himself entirely to his studies.

=== Hermit scholar fostering disciples ===
At the age of 37, he took the civil service exam at his mother's urging, but he failed. He then abandoned the exams, choosing to live a life detached from official positions and focusing his efforts on scholarly research and cultivating virtue instead. However, as his reputation as a scholar grew, he was recommended for a government post in 1538 by prominent figures such as Yi Ŏnjŏk (1491–1553), the Governor of Gyeongsang-do. He declined the appointment and refused Lee's request for a meeting, promising to meet at a later date.

In 1545, when he turned 45, the Eulsa Literati Purge (을사사화; 乙巳士禍) brought calamity upon his close associates. He lamented the world and withdrew further still. Coinciding with the death of his mother, he returned to his hometown to mourn. After completing the mourning rites, he established a Confucian academy in his hometown of Togol (토골; 兎洞) and lectured on Neo-Confucianism.

In 1553, when Cho Sik declined a post in the central government offered to him by the court, Yi Hwang sent him a letter urging him to accept the position and suggesting that they write to each other. They exchanged three or four letters thereafter.

The following year, aged 55, Cho was appointed Magistrate of Dangseong County. However, he submitted a letter of resignation to King Myeongjong, who had ascended the throne at a young age, urging him to guard against the political involvement of his maternal relatives. Cho cautioned the king against referring to his mother, Queen Dowager Munjeong, as a 'lonely woman in the palace', and implored him to focus on stabilizing the nation and restoring public trust amid the crisis.

His upright and critical spirit was long praised by later generations. He then submitted a resignation petition known as the Danseong Resignation Petition (사직소; 辭職疏) and returned to his hometown.

Around this time, prominent figures such as Jeong In-hong and Park Je-hyeon began studying under him. In 1561, he left Togol and moved to Sancheong in Gyeongsang Province, from where he could see the peak of Jirisan Mountain, Cheonwangbong (천왕봉; 天王峯). Admiring his reputation, scholars flocked not only from nearby regions, but also from Seoul. Among them were individuals who would go on to make their mark on history, including Choi Hwang (최황; 崔滉; 1529-1603) and Kwak Chaeu (1552–1617).

=== Life-risking petitions for reform ===
The Danseong Petition is just one example of the many times that Cho risked his life to petition the king for political reform and stability for the people. In 1566, following the death of Queen Munjeong and the downfall of Yun Won-hyeong, the era of political manipulation by royal in-laws came to an end. As part of efforts to reform politics and restore public trust, Cho Sik was recognized alongside figures such as Seong Un and Yi Hang as a reclusive scholar deserving of an official post. At the age of 66, he traveled to the capital, met the king face-to-face and answered his questions. However, recognizing the lack of sincerity in King Myeongjong and the ministers' insufficient experience, he immediately resigned and returned to his hometown.

The following year, after King Seonjo ascended the throne, Cho Sik was repeatedly recommended as a virtuous figure to assist in the new administration. In 1569, he was offered a senior position in the central government. However, upon learning that the court intended to appoint him to a position in the Royal Clan Office (종친부전첨; 宗親府典籤) that was merely a prestigious title without real authority, he declined, citing old age and illness. Nevertheless, he often submitted petitions to the king listing ten major abuses of the time and warning that, while relief for the people was urgent, the court was preoccupied with theoretical discussions of Neo-Confucianism and lacked substantive debate. In his 1568 petition, the 'Petition of the Year of the Dragon' (무진봉사; 戊辰封事), submitted at the age of 68, Cho Sik argued that low-level clerks in local government offices were ruining the nation (서리망국론; 胥吏亡國論) and strongly advocated eradicating their corrupt practices.

However, he became embroiled in a scandal that erupted in the Jinju region during the early years of King Seonjo's reign. Cho Sik was implicated as a key figure behind an incident in which the family his disciples claimed to be responsible for the scandal was expelled from their hometown. This led to slander from central officials and placed him in a difficult position. Nevertheless, his disciples serving in the court vigorously defended him, allowing him to escape unscathed. Upon hearing news of his illness, King Seonjo even sent food and physicians. Ultimately, however, this scandal led to a confrontation between Jeong In-hong and his disciples on the one hand, and Yi Ŏnjŏk and Yi Hwang on the other.

Cho Sik died at home at the age of 72, before the royal physician dispatched by the king could arrive. It is said that, until his final moments, he spoke to his disciples about the importance of reverence and righteousness. He then quietly closed his eyes, maintaining a dignified posture. Upon hearing the news of his death, King Seonjo sent a royal envoy to offer his condolences.

== Characteristics of thought ==
In his youth, Cho Sik focused on preparing for the civil service examinations, but he gradually turned to Neo-Confucianism. He immersed himself in the Four Books and Five Classics and the writings of Song dynasty Neo-Confucian scholars. He regarded a bright mind as 'reverence' (敬) and decisive action as 'righteousness' (義), establishing these as the foundation of his learning. Cho Sik's assertion embodied his philosophy: cultivate the mind through 'reverence' and conduct daily life with 'righteousness'.

This differed from the approach of Toegye Yi Hwang, who focused on 'pursuing principles through reverence' (居敬窮理) to find the origin of 'reverence', and who delighted in discussing the theory of the Four Ends and Seven Emotions (四端七情) and the self-serving nature of the human heart and mind. He also left behind writings on these topics. In contrast, Cho Sik believed that, once the principles had been elucidated by Cheng Yi and Zhu Xi, there was no need for further discussion; a scholar's true duty lay in practicing righteousness in daily life.

Consequently, when Yi Hwang debated with Gi Daeseung over the theory of Li-Qi Human Nature (이기심성설; 理氣心性說), Cho Sik even wrote a letter criticizing Yi Hwang, stating that someone who does not know how to water plants or sweep the yard properly should stop deceiving the world and stealing fame by merely discussing the principles of heaven. While Yi Hwang focused consistently on moral content in his Seonghaksipdo (성학십도; 聖學十圖 meaning 'Ten Diagrams of Saga Learning'), Cho Sik pointed out errors in reality and emphasized correct practice. Thus, although he valued Neo-Confucianism, Cho Sik was also proficient in various studies closely tied to daily life, such as astronomy, geography, medicine, divination and military science. When teaching his disciples, he guided them towards self-realization by suggesting methods rather than lecturing. Drawing on the teachings of Laozi and Zhuangzi as a means of mental and physical cultivation, he adopted characteristics of Taoism, Zen Buddhism and Yangming philosophy.

Regarding his character, it was noted that 'after middle age, he kept his body pure, upheld his resolve, disciplined himself with ritual propriety, and thus his conduct was outstanding'. His rival, Toegye, remarked that his character "stood tall and soared above the mundane world; his pure and bright nature was so lofty and distant, it seemed beyond the world". Although he lived his entire life as a hermit scholar and never held an official post, he did not merely immerse himself in scholarship. He showed a resolute spirit, boldly confronting injustice to alleviate the world's sorrows and save people's livelihoods.

=== Nammyeong School ===
Representing Cho Sik's disciples, Jeong In-hong, Choi Yeong-gyeong, Ha Hang, Kim Woo-ong and Jeong Gu-ro formed the Nammyeong School, which rivalled the disciples of Toegye during the reigns of King Seonjo and King Gwanghaegun. They also became the backbone of the Northerners faction in the central political arena, seizing power during King Gwanghaegun's reign. When the nation was in crisis during the Imjin (1592) Japanese invasion, they did not stand idly by. Fifty or so disciples, including Jeong In-hong, rose up against the Japanese invaders. Kim Myeon commanded 5,000 righteous soldiers (militia), while Kwak Chaeu, the Red-clad General, led the righteous army in fierce combat against the Japanese troops.

However, following the Injo Restoration (인조반정; 仁祖反正), which overthrew Gwanghaegun, Jeong In-hong was branded a traitor and executed. The influence of the Nammyeong School declined sharply thereafter, and it barely maintained a presence in the Jinju region.

== Honors and commemoration ==
Following his death, Cho Sik was posthumously promoted to the position of Chief Censor of the Office of the Censor-General (Daesagan; 대사간; 大司諫). In 1615, during the reign of King Gwanghaegun, he was posthumously elevated to Chief State Councillor (영의정; 領議政). He was honoured with a place of enshrinement at the Deokcheon Seowon (덕천서원; 德川書院) in Jinju, the Sinsan Seowon (신산서원; 新山書院) in Gimhae, and the Yongam Seowon (용암서원; 龍巖書院) in Samga.

== Family ==
- Father
  - Cho Ŏnhyŏng (조언형; 曺彦亨)
- Mother
  - Lady Yi of the Incheon Yi clan (인천 이씨)
- Sibling(s)
  - Unnamed older brother
  - Younger sister - Lady Cho of the Changnyeong Cho clan (창녕 조씨; 昌寧 曺氏)
  - Unnamed younger brother
  - Younger sister - Lady Cho of the Changnyeong Cho clan (창녕 조씨; 昌寧 曺氏)
  - Younger sister - Lady Cho of the Changnyeong Cho clan (창녕 조씨; 昌寧 曺氏)
  - Younger sister - Lady Cho of the Changnyeong Cho clan (창녕 조씨; 昌寧 曺氏)
  - Younger sister - Lady Cho of the Changnyeong Cho clan (창녕 조씨; 昌寧 曺氏)
- Spouse
  - Lady Cho of the Nampyeong Cho clan (남평 조씨; 南平 曺氏)
- Children
  - Son - Cho Ch'asan (조차산; 曺次山); died prematurely
  - Daughter - Lady Cho of the Changnyeong Cho clan (창녕 조씨; 昌寧 曺氏)
    - Son-in-law - Kim Haeng (김행; 金行)
      - Granddaughter - Lady Kim of the Sangju Kim clan (상주 김씨; 尙州 金氏)
        - Grandson-in-law - Kwak Chaeu of the Hyeonpung Kwak clan (1552–1617)
- Concubines and their children
  - Lady Song of the Eunjin Song clan (은진 송씨); daughter of Song Rin (송린)
    - Son - Cho Ch'asŏk (조차석; 曺次石)
    - Son - Cho Ch'ama (조차마; 曺次磨)
    - Son - Cho Ch'ajŏng (조차정; 曺次矴)
    - Daughter - Lady Cho of the Changnyeong Cho clan (창녕 조씨; 昌寧 曺氏)
  - Unnamed concubine

== Works ==
- Nammyŏng chip (남명집; 南冥集)
- Nammyŏng hakgi (남명학기; 南冥學記)
- Sinmyŏng sado (신명사도; 神明舍圖)
- P'ahan chapgi (파한잡기; 破閑雜記)
- Nammyŏng hakki yup'yŏn (남명학기유편; 南冥學記類編)
- Nammyŏng ka (남명가; 南冥歌)
- Kwŏnsŏnjiro ka (권선지로가; 勸善指路歌)

== See also ==
- Yi Hwang
- Chŏng Ku
- Yi I
- Sŏng Hon
- Yi Ŏnjŏk
