= Kim Simin =

Joseon general (1554–1592)

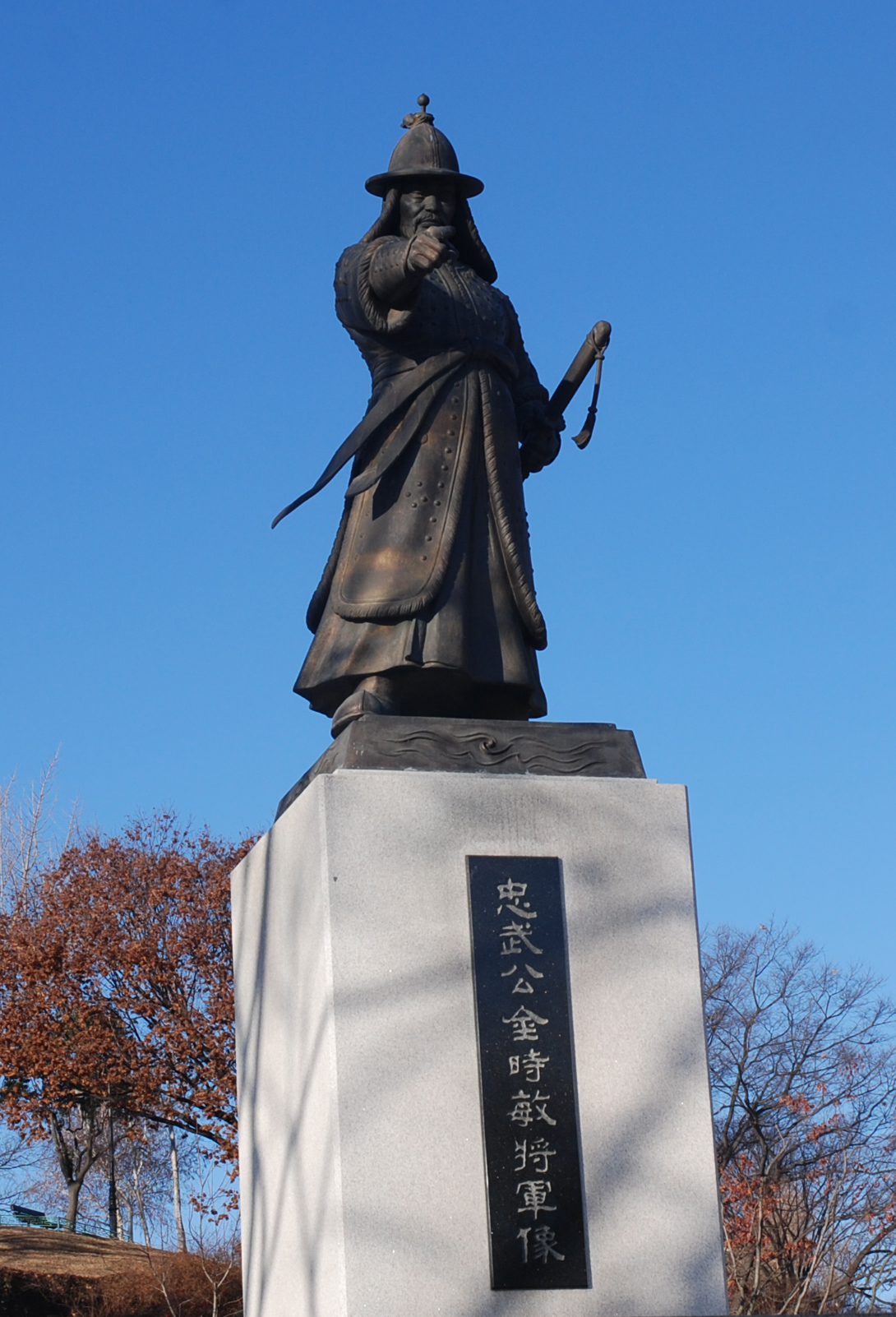

Korean name
- Hangul: 김시민
- Hanja: 金時敏
- RR: Gim Simin
- MR: Kim Simin

Courtesy name
- Hangul: 면오
- Hanja: 勉吾
- RR: Myeono
- MR: Myŏno

Posthumous name
- Hangul: 충무
- Hanja: 忠武
- RR: Chungmu
- MR: Ch'ungmu

Kim Simin (Korean: 김시민; Hanja: 金時敏; 1554–1592) was a prominent Korean general during the Joseon period. He is most famous for having defended Jinju Castle against the Japanese invaders during the Seven Years' War. He came from the (old) Andong Kim clan.

== Background ==
Kim Simin was born in Chungcheong Province in 1554, the son of Kim Ch'unggap. Historically, he is the 12th generation descendant of the Goryeo period general Kim Bang-gyeong (김방경, 金方慶; 1212–1300).

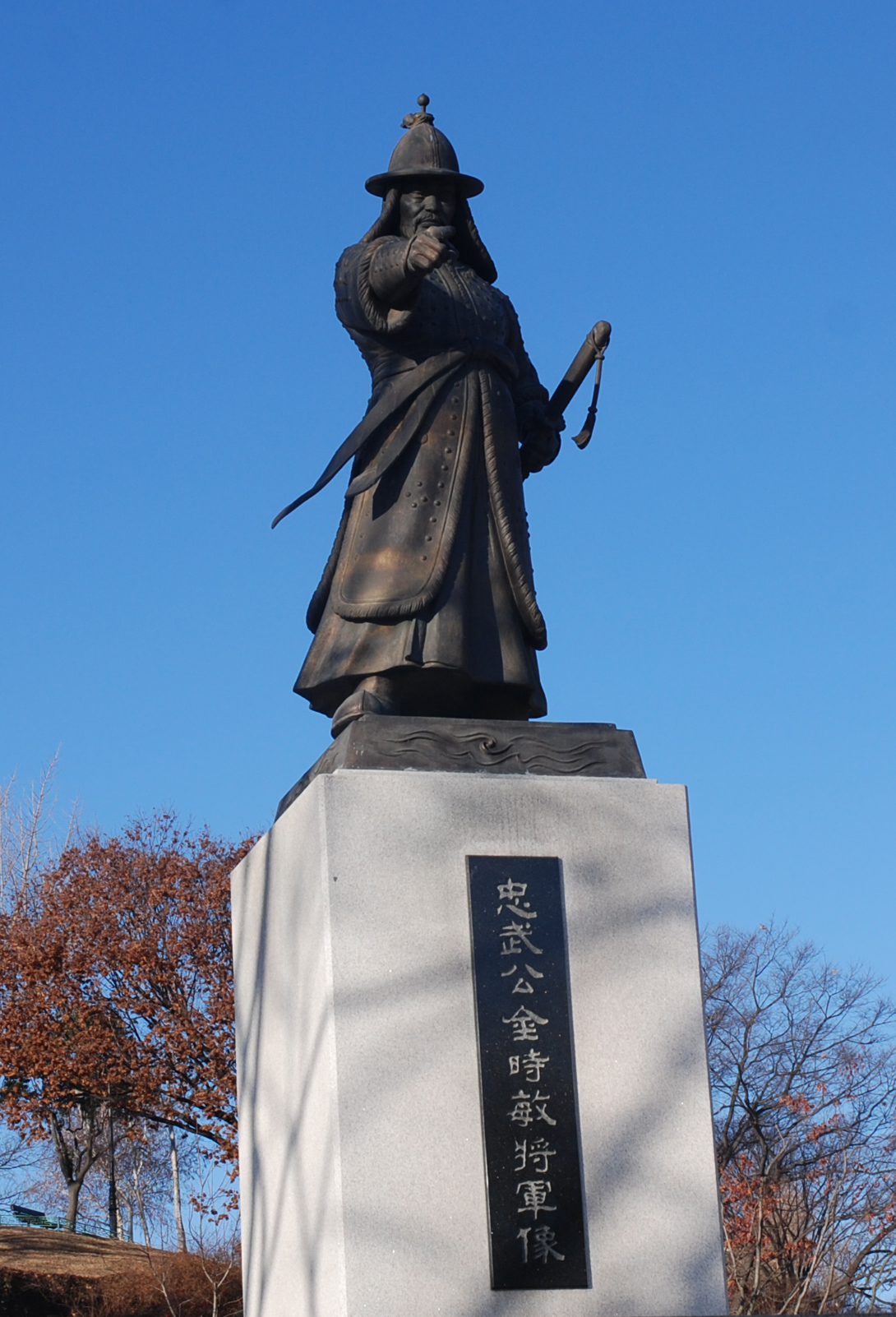
Statue of Kim Simin at the Jinju Fortress

== Government ==
In 1578, Kim passed the government military examination and was appointed as a training official. When he inspected the available weaponry and soldiers, he found that none were satisfactory for proper training. Thus he went to see the Minister of War concerning the fact that the nation would be under peril if a sudden crisis occurred and the national soldiers were not ready. However, the Minister replied that no such crisis can occur in such a peaceful time and that a strong military could frighten the peasants and therefore rejected Kim's proposition of a well prepared military.

Kim continued to plead to the Minister but as he was constantly rejected, he removed his military clothing in front of the minister, stepped on them and left the room. In 1583, when Nitangjie (니탕개; 尼湯介), the Jurchen defect rebelled against the Joseon government in Hoeryeong, Kim rejoined the armed forces under General Jeong Eon-sin. As the second-in-command, he earned great merit in defeating the Jurchens.

== Japanese Invasions and Siege of Jinju ==
Kim was made an official in Jinju Castle in 1591, and with the sudden death of the castle's guardian Yi Gyeong, and the beginning of the Imjin Wars he came to be the commander of the fortress. From there, he acted decisively to fortify the castle.

During the Wars, he defeated Japanese forces at Sacheon and Goseong and captured the Japanese commander Pyeongsotae at Jinhae. With this merit he was appointed Right Gyeongsang provincial army district Commander (경상우도병마절도사) and once again defeated the Japanese at Geumsan.

The Japanese general Ukita Hideie and Hosokawa Tadaoki agreed on taking Jinju castle because if the Japanese captured it, it would open up a new road to Jeolla, and they would be able to attack Gwak Jae-u's guerilla forces hiding in the area. Jeolla was also place for plenty of loot. Ukita also agreed to recapture Changwon, a small fortress that led to Jinju castle. Therefore, an army of 20,000 men to recapture Changwon and Jinju set out.

The Japanese heartily approached Jinju castle. They expected another easy victory at Jinju but Kim defied the Japanese and stood firm with his 3,800 men. Again, the Koreans were outnumbered. Kim had recently acquired around 170 arquebuses, equivalent to what the Japanese used. He had his men trained with this new equipment and believed he could defend Jinju.

The Japanese charged and began to bring ladders to scale the wall. They also brought a siege tower to try to gain the higher ground. As a counter, the Koreans unleashed massive volleys of cannon balls, arrows, and bullets. Surprised, Hosokawa tried another angle of approach by using his arquebuses to cover the soldiers scaling the wall. This still had no success because the Koreans ignored the bullets and smashed ladders with rocks and axes. When the Koreans began to lob mortar rounds down at the Japanese, the Japanese began to lose even more men.

After three days of fighting, Kim was hit by a bullet on the side of his head and fell, unable to command his forces. The Japanese commanders then pressed even harder on the Koreans to dishearten them. But the Koreans fought on. The Japanese soldiers were still unable to scale the walls even with heavy fire from arquebuses. The Koreans were not in a good position since Kim Simin was wounded and the garrison was now running low on ammunition.

However, Gwak Jae-u one of the main leaders of the irregular armies of Korea arrived at night with an extremely small band, not enough to relieve the Koreans at Jinju. Gwak ordered his men to grab attention by blowing on horns and making noises. About 3,000 guerrillas and irregular forces arrived at the scene. At this time, the Japanese commanders realized their danger and were forced to abandon the siege and retreated. The irregular army was too small to relieve Jinju. But, the retreat of Japanese soldiers heartened the Koreans and the biggest thing earned from the siege was that the Korean morale was boosted greatly.

== Death ==
The Japanese general Ukita Hideie and Hosokawa Tadaoki commanding twenty-thousand troops, surrounded and besieged Jinju Castle. For seven days and nights, the 3,800 Koreans defending the castle repeatedly repelled and defeated the Japanese, but Kim was killed in action from an arquebus round to the head.

In 1604, Kim was awarded the posthumous title Sangrakgun (상락군; 上洛君).

== Legacy ==
Jinju Fortress, designated as a Historic Site of South Korea in 1963, includes a memorial to Kim Simin.

== Family ==
- Father – Kim Ch'unggap (김충갑; 金忠甲; 1515–?)
- Mother – Lady Yi of the Changpyeong Yi clan (증 정경부인 창평 이씨; 昌平李氏)
- Sibling(s)
  - Older brother - Kim Sihoe (김시회; 金時晦)
    - Nephew - Kim Ch'i (김치; 金緻); became his adoptive son
- Spouse
  - Lady Sŏ of the Buyeo Seo clan (부여 서씨; 扶餘 徐氏)
- Issue
  - Adoptive son - Kim Ch'i (김치; 金緻)

== See also ==
- History of Korea
- Japanese invasions of Korea
- Hideyoshi's invasions of Korea
