= Jinju National Museum =

National museum in Jinju, South Korea

Coordinates: 35°11′20″N 128°04′37″E

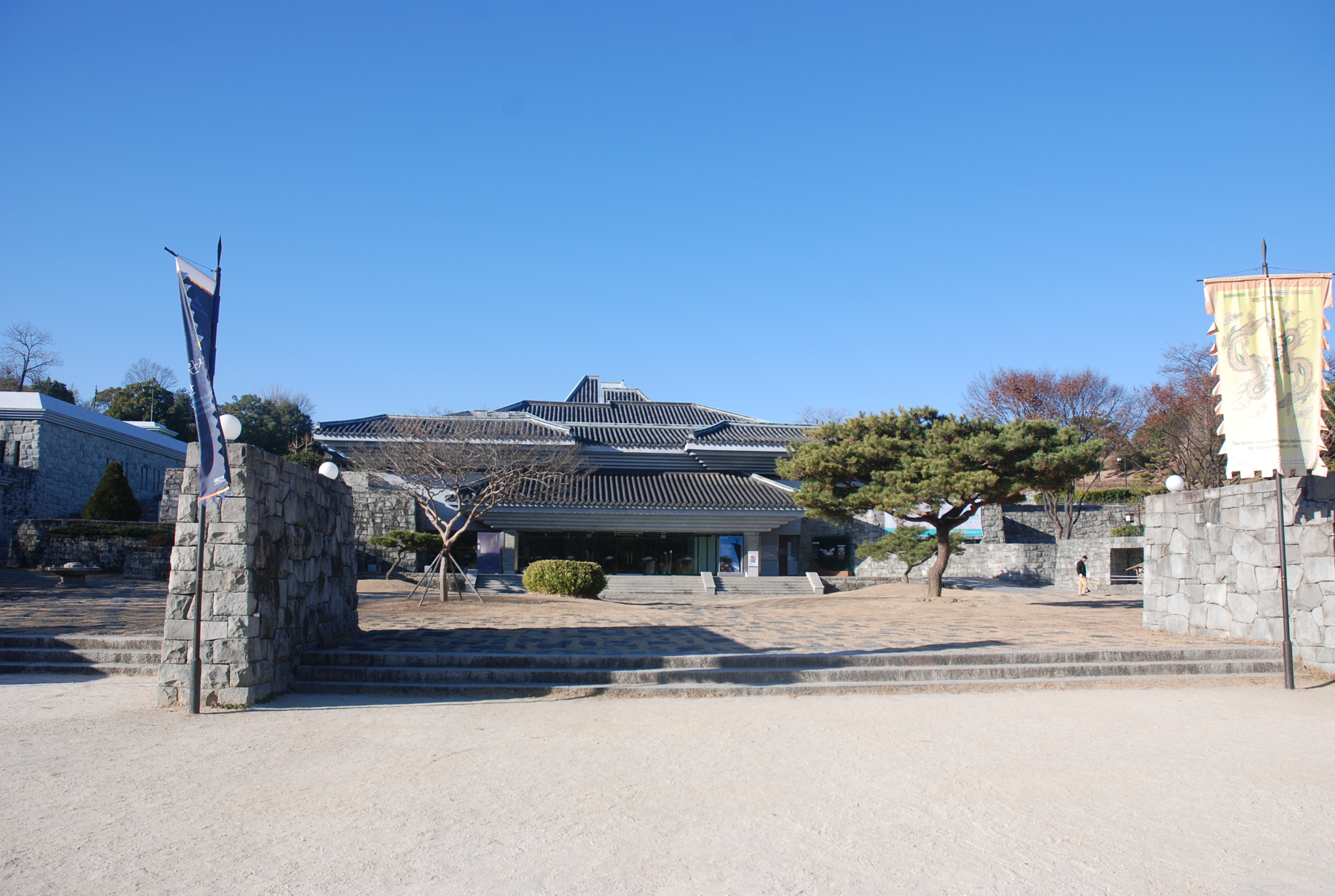
- Established: September 2, 1984
- Location: Jinju
- Type: Museum
- Website: https://jinju.museum.go.kr/

Korean name
- Hangul: 국립진주박물관
- Hanja: 國立晉州博物館
- RR: Gungnip Jinju bangmulgwan
- MR: Kungnip Chinju pangmulgwan

Jinju National Museum (Korean: 국립진주박물관) is a national museum located in Jinju Fortress, Jinju, South Korea. It opened in February 1984 with the purpose of specializing in the Japanese invasions of Korea (1592–1598), or Imjinwaeran.

== See also ==
- List of museums in South Korea
- National museum
- Japanese invasions of Korea (1592–1598)
