= Mongmasansŏng =

Former fortress in Changnyeong, South Korea

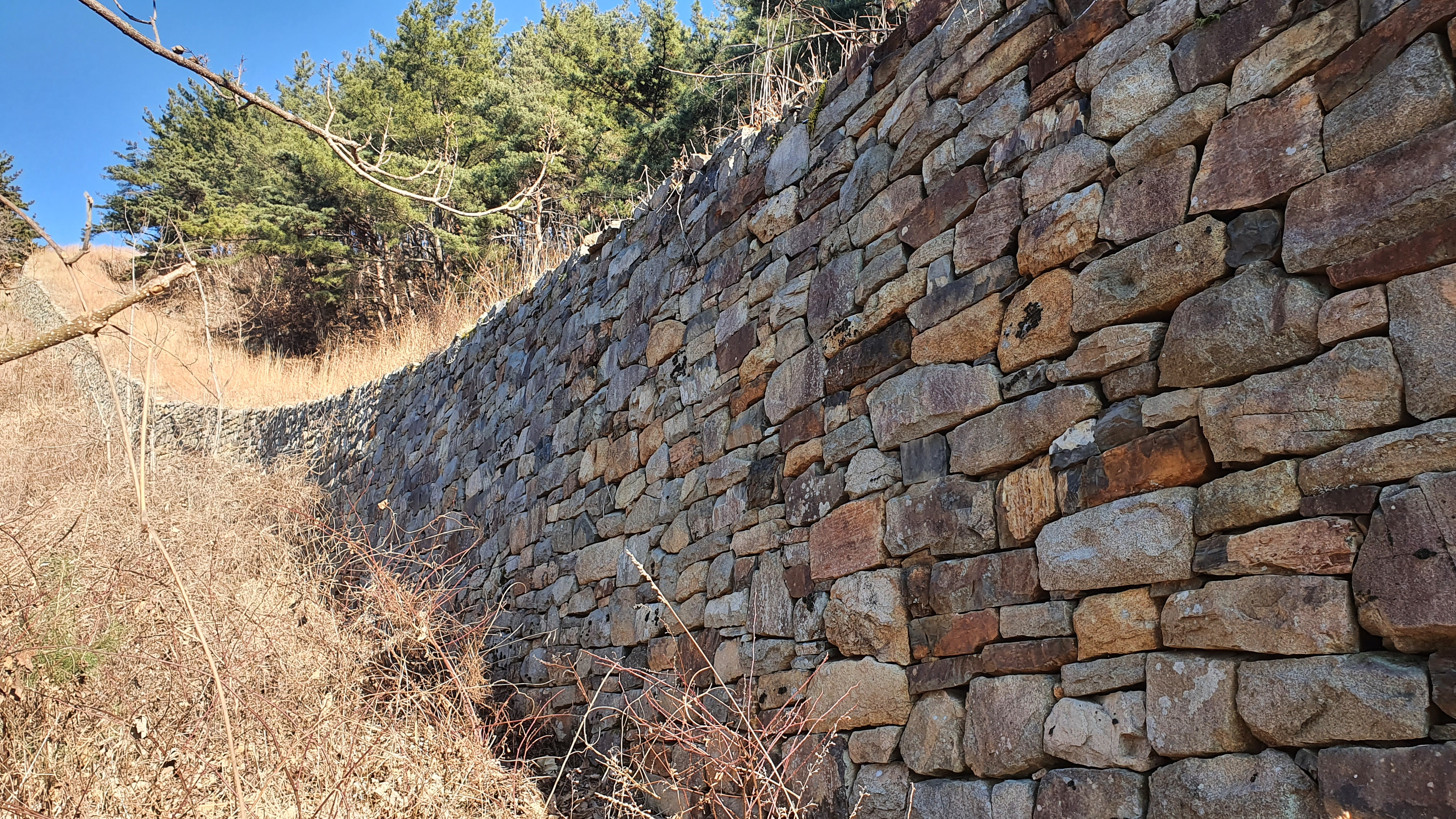
- Part of the fortress wall (2021)
- Interactive map of the Mongmasansŏng area

General information
- Location: Changnyeong County, South Gyeongsang Province, South Korea
- Coordinates: 35°32′42.2″N 128°30′58.5″E

Design and construction
- Designations

Historic Sites of South Korea
- Official name: Mongmasanseong Fortress, Changnyeong
- Designated: 1963-01-21
- Reference no.: 65

Mongmasansŏng (Korean: 목마산성; Hanja: 牧馬山城; RR: Mongmasanseong) was a Gaya–era ancient Korean fortress in what is now Changnyeong County, South Gyeongsang Province, South Korea. On January 21, 1963, its former site was made Historic Site of South Korea No. 65.

It is not known when exactly the fortress was constructed, although it was likely sometime during the Gaya confederacy's existence (42–562). Many Gaya-era tombs are located around the fortress. During the 1592–1598 Imjin War, the Korean general Kwak Chaeu renovated the fortress. The fortress wall is around 1.9 km (1.2 mi) in length. It is comparatively still intact. Its name refers to raising horses, which was possibly done in the area in the past.
