= Gyeongnam National University of Science and Technology =

National university in Jinju, South Korea

Coordinates: 35°10′50.1″N 128°5′38.3″E

- Established: April 30, 1910
- Location: Jinju, South Gyeongsang, South Korea
- Website: www.gju.ac.kr

Korean name
- Hangul: 경남과학기술대학교
- Hanja: 慶南科學技術大學校
- RR: Gyeongnam gwahak gisul daehakgyo
- MR: Kyŏngnam kwahak kisul taehakkyo

Gyeongnam National University of Science and Technology (GNTECH; Korean: 경남과학기술대학교) is a national university located in Jinju, South Korea.

The university was integrated in the Gyeongsang National University in 2021.

== Notable alumni ==
- Kim In-hyeok, volleyball player
