= Siege of Jinju (1592) =

1592 siege of the Imjin War

First siege of Jinju
- Part of the Imjin War
Date	November 8–13, 1592 (Gregorian Calendar); October 5–10, 1592 (Lunar Calendar)
Location	Jinju Fortress, Korea 35.189°N 128.077°E
Result	Korean victory

Belligerents
Japanese Seventh Division	Korean army, citizens

Commanders and leaders
Ukita Hideie; Hosokawa Tadaoki; Hosokawa Genbanojoe; Kato Mitsuyasu; Hasegawa Hidekazu; Kimura Shigekore; Shinzo Naosada; Kasuya Takenori; Ota Kazuyosi; Motosima Matasaburo †; Taguchi Yasuke †; Yonemoto Sugejiro †; Ikuda Ubee †	Kim Si-min †; Gwak Jaeu; Kim Sŏngil; Yi Gwang-ak; Seong Su-gyeong; Choi Dak-ryang; Shim Dae-seung; Kim Jun-min; Jeong Gi-ryong; Im Gye-yeong; Choi Gyeong-hoe; Yu Sung-in †

Strength
30,000	3,800 soldiers 2,200+ irregulars 170 muskets

Casualties and losses
10,300+ dead	less than 1,000
- Location within South Korea

- Siege of Jinju
- Hangul: 진주 대첩
- Hanja: 晋州大捷
- RR: Jinju daecheop
- MR: Chinju taech'ŏp

The first siege of Jinju was one of the major land battles during the Imjin War – the first occurred during the fall of 1592, and the second one in spring of 1593. The siege ended in a Korean victory and prevented the Japanese advance into Southwestern Korea. It was followed up by the second siege of Jinju the next year.

== Military strength ==
=== Joseon ===
- Kim Si-min – 3,700 soldiers
- Yi Gwang-ak – 100 soldiers
- Gwak Jaeu – 200 irregulars
- Choi Gyeong-hoe, Im Gye-yeong – 2,000 irregulars

Total 3,800 soldiers and 2,200 irregulars

=== Japan ===
- Ukita Hideie – 10,000 soldiers
- Hosokawa Tadaoki – 3,500 soldiers
- Hasegawa Hidekazu – 5,000 soldiers
- Kimura Shigekore – 3,500 soldiers
- Kato Mitsuyasu – 1,747 soldiers
- Shinzo Naosada – 300 soldiers
- Kasuya Takenori – 200 soldiers
- Ota Kazuyosi – 160 soldiers

Total 30,000 soldiers

== Background ==
Jinju Fortress was an important city fortress that guarded the inways to Jeolla province. Ukita Hideie and Hosokawa Tadaoki agreed on taking the fortress because if captured, it would open up a new road to Jeolla, and they would be able to attack Gwak Jaeu's guerilla forces hiding in the area. Jeolla was also a place for plenty of loot. Ukita also agreed to recapture Changwon, a small fortress that led to Jinju fortress. Therefore, an army of 30,000 men to capture Changwon and Jinju set out. The Japanese Seventh Contingent arrived at Jinju on 8 November with 30,000 men under Kato Mitsuyasu, Hasegawa Hidekazu, Nagaoka Tadaoki, and Kimura Shigeji.

Yu Sung-in, commander of right Gyeongsang province, placed his army in front of the gate of Jinju. General Yu Sung-in requested permission to enter into the Jinju. However, Japanese arquebuses reached behind the reinforcements. Kim Si-min inevitably rejected the request, and Yu Sung-in ultimately agreed to Kim Si-min's words. The reinforcements were annihilated by the Japanese arquebuses.

== Siege of Jinju ==
The Japanese heartily approached Jinju fortress. They expected another easy victory at Jinju but the Korean general Kim Si-min defied the Japanese and stood firm with his 3,800 men. Again, the Koreans were outnumbered. Kim Si-min had recently acquired around 170 arquebuses, equivalent to what the Japanese used. Kim Si-min had them trained and believed he could defend Jinju.

The Japanese charged and began to bring ladders to scale the wall. They also brought a siege tower to try to gain the higher ground. As a counter, the Koreans unleashed massive volleys of cannons, arrows, and bullets. Surprised, Hosokawa tried another angle of approach by using his arquebuses to cover the soldiers scaling the wall. This still had no success because the Koreans ignored the bullets and smashed ladders with rocks and axes. When the Koreans began to lob mortars down at the Japanese, the Japanese began to lose even more men. The Taikōki reported:

As we try to become ichiban nori ["the first to climb in"], they climbed up as in a swarm. Because of this the ladders almost broke, and comrades fell down from their climb, so they could not use the ladders. Hosokawa Tadaoki's brother, Sadaoki, was one such, accompanied by foot soldiers on ladders on his right and left, and strictly ordered, "Until I have personally climbed into the castle this ladder is for one person to climb. If anyone climbs I will take his head!", then he climbed. Because of this, the ladder did not break and the men who saw him were loud in their praise. Consequently, before long he placed his hands on the wall, but when he tried to make his entry from within the castle, spears and naginata were thrust at him to try to make him fall, and lamentably, he fell to the bottom of the moat.

After three days of fighting, Kim Si-min was hit by a bullet on the side of his head and fell, unable to command his forces. The Japanese commanders then pressed even harder on the Koreans to dishearten them, but the Koreans fought on. The Japanese soldiers were still unable to scale the walls even with heavy fire from arquebuses. The Koreans were not in a good position since Kim Si-min was wounded and the garrison was now running low on ammunition.

== Reinforcements ==
Gwak Jae-u, one of the main leaders of the Righteous armies of Korea arrived at night with an extremely small band, not enough to relieve the Koreans at Jinju. Gwak ordered his men to grab attention by blowing on horns and making noises. About 3,000 guerrillas and irregular forces arrived at the scene. At this time, the Japanese commanders realized their danger and were forced to abandon the siege and retreated.

== Aftermath ==
The Righteous army was too small to relieve Jinju. But, the retreat of Japanese soldiers heartened the Koreans and the biggest thing earned from the siege was that the Korean morale was boosted greatly.

The first battle of Jinju along with the Battle of Hansan Island and the Battle of Haengju are regarded as the three most important battles of the war.

In 1593, the Japanese returned the next summer and burned Jinju to the ground.

== See also ==
- Battle of Hansan Island
- Battle of Haengju
- Siege of Jinju (1593)
- List of castles in Korea

== Bibliography ==
- Alagappa, Muthiah (2003), Asian Security Order: Instrumental and Normative Features, Stanford University Press, ISBN 978-0-8047-4629-8
- Arano, Yasunori (2005), The Formation of a Japanocentric World Order, International Journal of Asian Studies
- Brown, Delmer M. (May 1948), "The Impact of Firearms on Japanese Warfare, 1543–1598", The Far Eastern Quarterly, 7 (3): 236–53, doi:10.2307/2048846, JSTOR 2048846, S2CID 162924328
- Eikenberry, Karl W. (1988), "The Imjin War", Military Review, 68 (2): 74–82
- Ha, Tae-hung; Sohn, Pow-key (1977), 'Nanjung Ilgi: War Diary of Admiral Yi Sun-sin, Yonsei University Press, ISBN 978-89-7141-018-9
- Haboush, JaHyun Kim (2016), The Great East Asian War and the Birth of the Korean Nation
- Hawley, Samuel (2005), The Imjin War, The Royal Asiatic Society, Korea Branch/UC Berkeley Press, ISBN 978-89-954424-2-5
- Jang, Pyun-soon (1998), Noon-eu-ro Bo-nen Han-gook-yauk-sa 5: Gor-yeo Si-dae (눈으로 보는 한국역사 5: 고려시대), Park Doo-ui, Bae Keum-ram, Yi Sang-mi, Kim Ho-hyun, Kim Pyung-sook, et al., Joog-ang Gyo-yook-yaun-goo-won. 1998-10-30. Seoul, Korea.
- Kim, Ki-chung (Fall 1999), "Resistance, Abduction, and Survival: The Documentary Literature of the Imjin War (1592–8)", Korean Culture, 20 (3): 20–29
- Kim, Yung-sik (1998), "Problems and Possibilities in the Study of the History of Korean Science", Osiris, 2nd Series, 13: 48–79, doi:10.1086/649280, JSTOR 301878, S2CID 143724260
- 桑田忠親 [Kuwata, Tadachika], ed., 舊參謀本部編纂, [Kyu Sanbo Honbu], 朝鮮の役 [Chousen no Eki] (日本の戰史 [Nihon no Senshi] Vol. 5), 1965.
- Neves, Jaime Ramalhete (1994), "The Portuguese in the Im-Jim War?", Review of Culture, 18: 20–24
- Niderost, Eric (June 2001), "Turtleboat Destiny: The Imjin War and Yi Sun Shin", Military Heritage, 2 (6): 50–59, 89
- Niderost, Eric (January 2002), "The Miracle at Myongnyang, 1597", Osprey Military Journal, 4 (1): 44–50
- Park, Yune-hee (1973), Admiral Yi Sun-shin and His Turtleboat Armada: A Comprehensive Account of the Resistance of Korea to the 16th Century Japanese Invasion, Shinsaeng Press
- Rockstein, Edward D. (1993), Strategic And Operational Aspects of Japan's Invasions of Korea 1592–1598 1993-6-18, Naval War College
- Sadler, A. L. (June 1937), "The Naval Campaign in the Korean War of Hideyoshi (1592–1598)", Transactions of the Asiatic Society of Japan, Second Series, 14: 179–208
- Sansom, George (1961), A History of Japan 1334–1615, Stanford University Press, ISBN 978-0-8047-0525-7
- Sohn, Pow-key (April–June 1959), "Early Korean Painting", Journal of the American Oriental Society, 79 (2): 96–103, doi:10.2307/595851, JSTOR 595851
- Stramigioli, Giuliana (December 1954), "Hideyoshi's Expansionist Policy on the Asiatic Mainland", Transactions of the Asiatic Society of Japan, Third Series, 3: 74–116
- Strauss, Barry (Summer 2005), "Korea's Legendary Admiral", MHQ: The Quarterly Journal of Military History, 17 (4): 52–61
- Swope, Kenneth M. (2006), "Beyond Turtleboats: Siege Accounts from Hideyoshi's Second Invasion of Korea, 1597–1598", Sungkyun Journal of East Asian Studies, 6 (2): 177–206
- Swope, Kenneth M. (2005), "Crouching Tigers, Secret Weapons: Military Technology Employed During the Sino-Japanese-Korean War, 1592–1598", The Journal of Military History, 69: 11–42, doi:10.1353/jmh.2005.0059, S2CID 159829515
- Swope, Kenneth M. (December 2002), "Deceit, Disguise, and Dependence: China, Japan, and the Future of the Tributary System, 1592–1596", The International History Review, 24 (4): 757–1008, doi:10.1080/07075332.2002.9640980, S2CID 154827808
- Swope, Kenneth M. (2009), A Dragon's Head and a Serpent's Tail: Ming China and the First Great East Asian War, 1592–1598, University of Oklahoma Press
- Turnbull, Stephen (2002), Samurai Invasion: Japan's Korean War 1592–98, Cassell & Co, ISBN 978-0-304-35948-6
- Turnbull, Stephen (2008), The Samurai Invasion of Korea 1592-98, Osprey Publishing Ltd
- Turnbull, Stephen (1998), The Samurai Sourcebook, Cassell & Co, ISBN 978-1-85409-523-7
- Villiers, John (1980), SILK and Silver: Macau, Manila and Trade in the China Seas in the Sixteenth Century (PDF) (A lecture delivered to the Hong Kong Branch of the Royal Asiatic Society at the Hong Kong Club. 10 June 1980), The HKUL Digital Initiatives
- Yi, Min-woong (2004), Imjin Wae-ran Haejeonsa: The Naval Battles of the Imjin War [임진왜란 해전사], Chongoram Media [청어람미디어], ISBN 978-89-89722-49-6
