= Nongae =

Korean kisaeng (1574–1593)

Ju Nongae
- Born: 1574; Daegok-ri, Imnae-myeon Juchon Village, Jangsu-hyeon, Jeolla Province, Joseon
- Died: 1593 (aged 18-19); Sunjeol, Jinjuseong Fortress, Jinju-mok, Gyeongsang Province, Joseon

Korean name
- Hangul: 논개
- Hanja: 論介
- RR: Nongae
- MR: Non'gae

Nongae or Ju Nongae (Korean: 주논개; Hanja: 朱論介; 1574–1593) was a gisaeng of Jinju during the Joseon period of Korea.

A popular legend tells the story of her sacrificial assassination of the Japanese general Keyamura Rokusuke.

== Biography ==
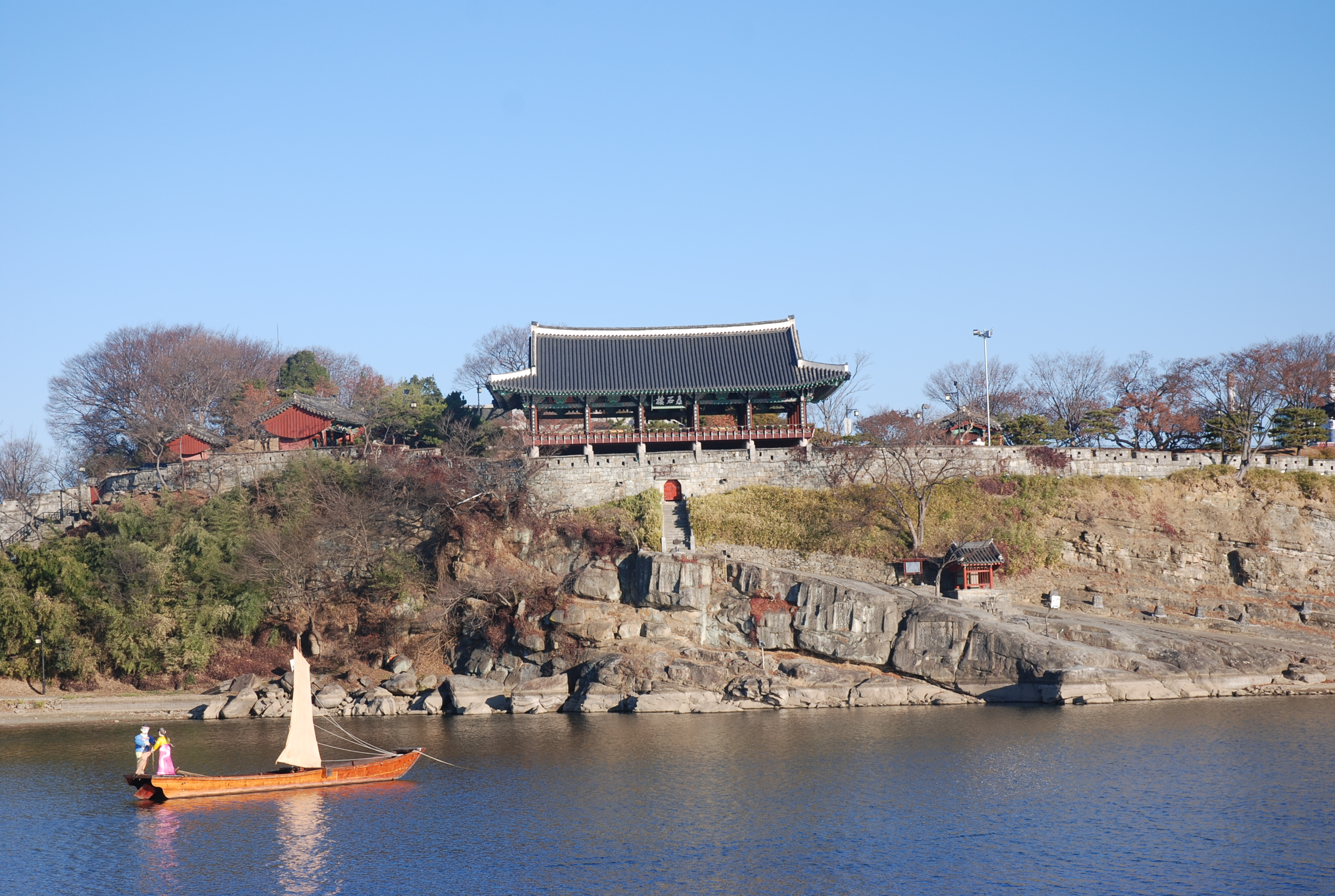
Choseokru pavilion and Nam River

Nongae was born in Jeolla Province during the late 16th century Joseon Dynasty. She was born into the Sinan Ju clan. Her father was Ju Dal-mun (주달문; 朱達文), who was a Jinsa scholar, and her mother, a woman with the family name Park, was from the Miryang Park clan. Nongae was a late-born child to the couple, whose son, Ju Dae-ryong (주대룡), died at the age of 15 from a disease.

In 1578, her father died at the age of 40 and she was entrusted to the care of her uncle Ju Dal-mu (주달무) who lived in a house in Anui-hyeon in Gyeongsang Province (present day Hamyang County, South Gyeongsang Province).

Nongae's uncle attempted to have her married to a man named Kim Bu-ho (김부호; 金富豪) in exchange for 50 sacks of rice. When Lady Park heard and learned of this attempted exchange, she stole Nongae from her uncle. By 1579, her mother was caught with Nongae and was prosecuted. Her mother's trial was overseen by a province official, Choi Gyeong-hwi of the Haeju Choi clan (최경회; 崔慶會), who ruled on behalf of her innocence. Nongae and her mother were later released and permitted to live at a residence in Hyeongam. By the age of 17, Nongae became a mistress of Choi and was given the title of "Lady Uiam of the Sinan Joo clan" (의암부인 신안 주씨; 義巖夫人 新安 朱氏), and lived in his house where she birthed a son.

In 1592, the Imjin War began and Choi started to recruit and train soldiers in Udo, Jeolla, in which Nongae helped him.

In 1593, Japanese forces invaded the Korean peninsula during which Choi was assassinated in June. Afterwards, the Japanese eventually succeeded in their invasion of Suyeong Fortress (now near Jinju). To celebrate the victory, soldiers forced all the gisaeng to serve them at the Choseokru Pavilion (nugak) on a cliff that overlooked the Nam River in Jinju. Nongae was called to entertain the victorious Japanese generals alongside the other gisaeng. Nongae walked to a steep rock sticking out of the Nam river under the Choseokru, which prevented the Japanese soldiers from joining her due to a fear of falling into the river. Nongae challenged the Japanese general, Keyamura Rokusuke, to join her. The general attempted to lure Nongae away from the rock. However, she eventually led him to the cliff-side, where she embraced him, clasped her fingers with rings that locked her around him, and cast herself along with the general into the river, killing them both. It is said that she sacrificed herself not only in revenge for Choi's murder but also out of love for her country. However this story is highly dubious and it is most likely to have originated from Park Jonghwa's (박중화; 朴鍾和) Nongae and Gyewolhyang (1962).

== After death ==
In 1625, 32 years after Nongae died, during the 3rd year of King Injo's reign, stories of her spread to the people of Jinju and "Uiam" was carved on the rock from which she jumped. In 1650, during the 2nd year of King Hyojong's reign, a court official arrived to examine a disaster that happened in Gyeongsang-Udo, and noted that he saw the words "Uiam" engraved on the rock when he visited Jinju. In 1721, during the 1st year of King Gyeongjong's reign, a Gyeongsangwoo soldier, Choi Jin-han (최진한; 崔鎭漢), built the Uiamsajeok monument right above the Uiam carving to memorialize Nongae. In 1739, during the 16th year of King Yeongjo's reign, another Gyeongsangwoo soldier, Nam Deok-ha (남덕하; 南德夏), built Uigisa, a shrine dedicated to Nongae, next to Chokseokru in Jinju.

In 1846, Jong Joo-seok (중주석) of Jangsu Hyeongam, built a memorial to honor Nongae. It was designated as Local Monument No. 46 in 1955, and the birthplace of Nongae has been restored in Juchon Village, Daegok-ri, Janggye-myeon, Jangsu-gun, where Nongae was born.

The rock from which she leapt, Uiam (의암; 義巖), has been called "the Rock of Righteousness".

During the mid 20th century, it was rumored that Nongae was a daughter and heir of a fallen yangban family and was eventually promoted to be the Jeongsil (정실 부인), wife, of Choi after he died.

== Family ==
- Father
  - Ju Dal-mun (주달문; 朱達文; 1500–1578)
    - Uncle: Ju Dal-mu (주달무)
- Mother
  - Lady Park of the Miryang Park clan (밀양 박씨; 密陽 朴氏; 1550–?)
- Sibling
  - Older brother: Ju Dae-ryeong (주대룡)
- Husband
  - Choi Gyeong-hwi (최경회; 崔慶會) of the Haeju Choi clan (해주 최씨; 海州 崔氏; 1532 – June 1593)
- Son
  - Choi Hong-nam (최홍남)

== Memorial ==
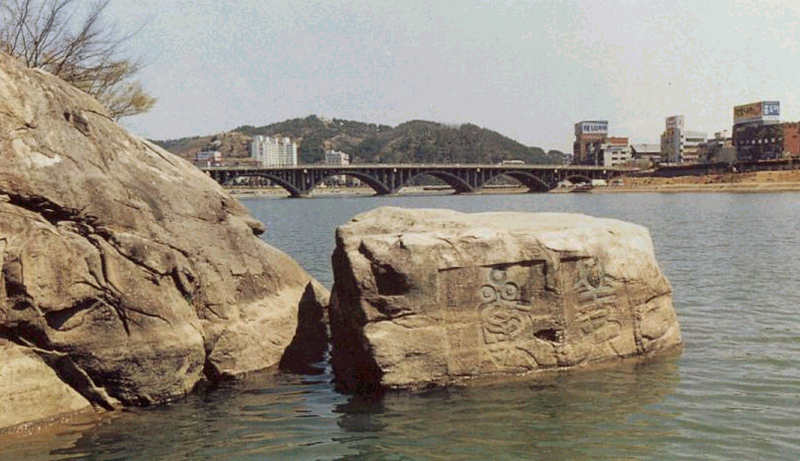
Uiam

According to 1868 records in Gyobang Gayo written by a local official, Jeong Hyun-Seok (정현석; 鄭顯奭), during the 5th year of King Gojong's reign, it is said a festival called Uiam Byeolje took place every June to pay respects to her spirit. Currently, there is a shrine to the memory of Nongae near Chokseokru, in central Jinju. Around the fortress, the Nongae festival has been celebrated every May since 2002 to honor and preserve the memory of Nongae.

The portrait of Nongae painted by Kim Eun-ho had been kept in Jinju fortress, whereas his drawing were forcibly removed by a local civil group that argued Kim was one of the renowned pro-Japanese artists during the Colonial Period. Following support from the regional government, a newly executed painting was adopted in 2008.

== See also ==
- Japanese invasions of Korea (1592–98)
- Military history of Korea
- Kisaeng
  - Hwang Jini
