= Cheonhwang Sikdang =

Historic restaurant in Jinju, South Korea

- Interactive map of Cheonhwang Sikdang

Restaurant information
- Established: 1927; 98 years ago
- Location: 3 Chokseok-ro 207beon-gil, Jinju, South Gyeongsang Province, South Korea
- Coordinates: 35.1961°N 128.0845°E
- Website: www.instagram.com/pnixresto/

Cheonhwang Sikdang (Korean: 천황식당; Hanja: 天凰食堂) is a historic restaurant in Jinju Jungang Market, Jinju, South Korea. It is among the oldest active restaurants in South Korea, having been founded in 1927. It specializes in the dish Jinju bibimbap.

It was established in 1927. It was called Daebang Halmae (대방 할매) and became renowned for its bibimbap. During the 1950–1953 Korean War, its original building was bombed and destroyed. The restaurant was rebuilt after the war by the original founder's daughter-in-law, Oh Bong-sun (오봉순). It was reported in 2004 that the restaurant had been using the same building since. A 2004 and a 2019 article claimed that the restaurant was on its third generation of owners. A 2006 article claimed the chairs and tables resembled the Japanese-Western Eclectic Architecture style.

The restaurant's menu is reportedly intentionally small. In addition to its Jeonju bibimbap, it serves the marinated meat dish bulgogi, the raw beef dish yukhoe, and the soup seonji-guk. The restaurant reportedly makes its own gochujang, soy sauce, and kimchi. It prepares these in large jangdok (earthenware pots) that are in the restaurant's courtyard.

In 2015, the restaurant was featured in an episode of Baek Jong-won's Top 3 Chef King.
