= Kim In-hyeok =

South Korean volleyball player (1995–2022)

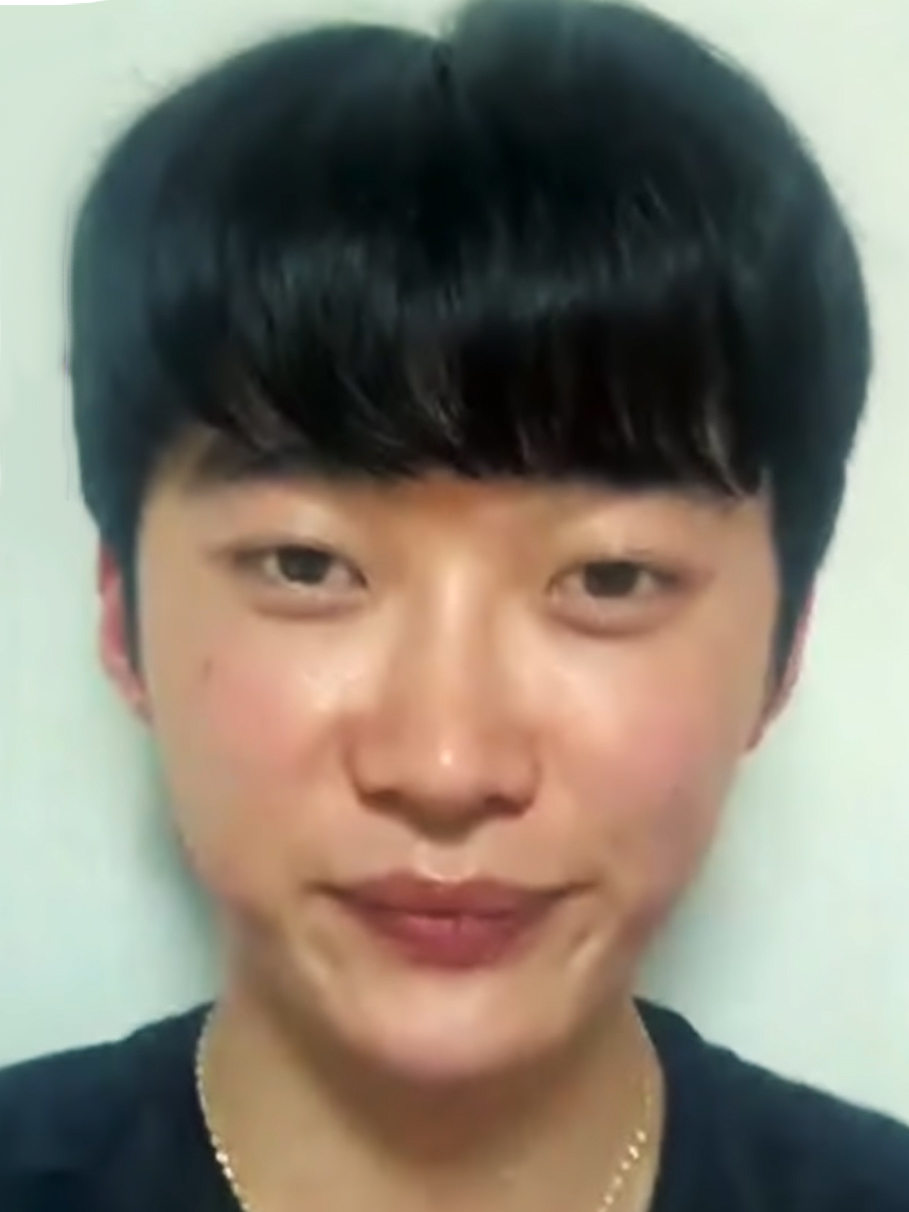
- Kim in 2019

Personal information
- Born: July 14, 1995 Gimhae, South Gyeongsang, South Korea
- Died: February 4, 2022 (aged 26) Suwon, Gyeonggi, South Korea
- Education: Gyeongnam National University of Science and Technology
- Height: 191 cm (6 ft 3 in)
- Weight: 81 kg (179 lb)

Volleyball information
- Position: Outside hitter

Career
- Years: Team
- 2017–2020: Suwon KEPCO Vixtorm
- 2020–2022: Daejeon Samsung Fire Bluefangs

National team
- Years: Team
- South Korea under-23: 2015
- South Korea: 2016

Korean name
- Hangul: 김인혁
- RR: Gim Inhyeok
- MR: Kim Inhyŏk
- Updated on February 4, 2022

Kim In-hyeok (Korean: 김인혁; July 14, 1995 – February 4, 2022) was a South Korean indoor volleyball player. He played as an outside hitter for Suwon KEPCO Vixtorm from 2017 to 2020 and Daejeon Samsung Fire Bluefangs from 2020 until his death in 2022.

== Early life and senior career ==
Kim In-hyeok was born on July 14, 1995, in Gimhae, South Gyeongsang Province. He graduated from Jinju Dongmyung Middle School. He attended Jinju Dongmyung High School and competed as part of the school's volleyball team at the Samsung Fire Cup 69th National Men's and Women's Volleyball Championship in 2014. It won the competition by defeating Youngsaeng High School at the finals with a final score of 3–0. Kim earned the Best Player award for his performance. The team went on to win at 48th Presidential National Men's and Women's Middle High School Volleyball Championship, where he was credited in part for the team's victory.

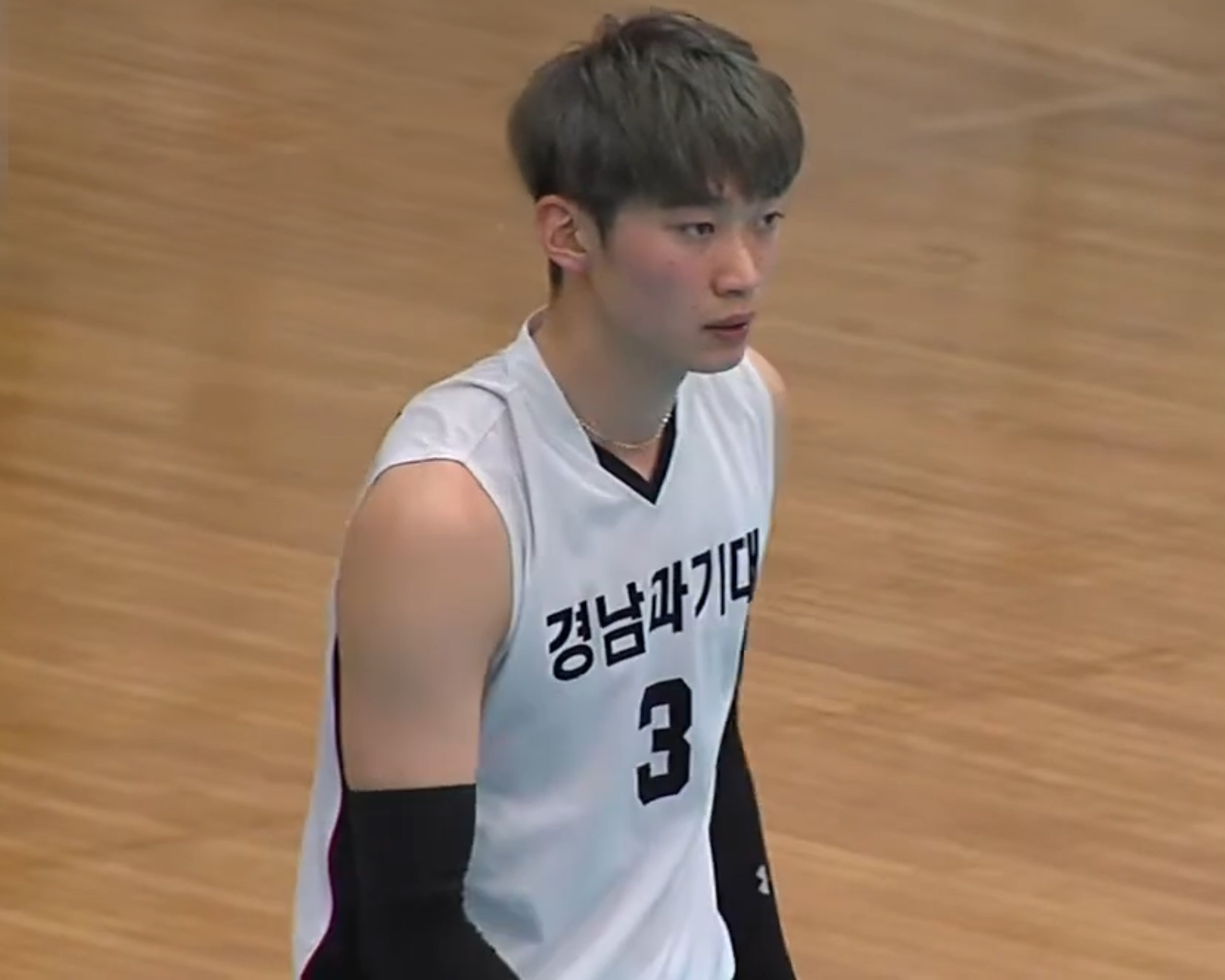
Kim in university, 2017

Kim later enrolled at Gyeongnam National University of Science and Technology. He joined Suwon KEPCO Vixtorm via rookie draft in 2017. In his second year, Kim left the team because of the difficulties he faced with the lifestyle of a volleyball professional and he cut off contact. He returned about a month later at the advice of the coach, staff, and teammates. In a match against Cheonan Hyundai Capital Skywalkers, Kim scored ten points via serve, a record among South Korean players and surpassing the 8-point record previously set by Hwang Du-yeon. In the 2019–20 V-League season, Kim scored 344 points in 32 matches.

Early in the 2020–21 V-League season, Kim was traded to Daejeon Samsung Fire Bluefangs. He sustained a torn finger during the first team practice, which impaired his ability to play. He scored six points in fifteen matches during the season and participated in two games the following season. By February 2022, he played a career total of 83 matches and scored 575 points.

== International career ==
In 2015, Kim was selected for the South Korea men's national volleyball team to compete in the 2015 Asian Men's U23 Volleyball Championship. He aided the squad in advancing to the quarterfinals by accumulating 38 points in the three preliminary matches, second only to Jung Ji-seok's 41 points. The team advanced to the finals, but lost 0–3 against Iran; Kim was bestowed the Blocking Award.

== Personal life and death ==
Throughout his career, Kim was subject to malicious online comments. He was accused of being gay, wearing makeup, and being a pornographic film actor. In August 2021, he pleaded with netizens to stop posting false information.

On February 4, 2022, Kim's club was unable to get in contact with him. His home in Suwon was visited by an acquaintance that day at around 3:00 pm KST, who found him dead. Kim was 26 years old. Prior to his death, Kim added the text "1995.7~2022.2" to the description of his Instagram profile, signifying his birth and death year. His body was transported to the Gimhae Hansol Rehabilitation & Convalescent Hospital. An investigation by the Suwon Nambu Police Station determined that there was no evidence of foul play. The death was ruled a suicide. At the request of his family, an autopsy was not performed.

Entertainer Hong Seok-cheon mourned Kim, lamenting his inability "to save another friend". Two days after his death, in their match against Ansan OK Financial Group Okman, the players of Daejeon Samsung Fire Bluefangs wore a ribbon on their jerseys in tribute to Kim. Ahead of the match, both teams observed a ten-second moment of silence.
