= Chinju National University of Education =

University in South Korea

- Type: Public
- Established: 1940
- President: Kim, Sung-gyu
- Location: Jinju, South Korea; 35.18640°N 128.06711°E
- Website: www.cue.ac.kr

- Chinju National University of Education
- Hangul: 진주교육대학교
- Hanja: 晉州敎育大學校
- RR: Jinju gyoyuk daehakgyo
- MR: Chinju kyoyuk taehakkyo

Chinju (Jinju) National University of Education (Korean: 진주교육대학교) is one of several national universities of education in South Korea. It provides training to many planning on careers in the country's public education system. The campus is located in Jinju City, South Gyeongsang province. The current president is Kim, Sung-gyu (김성규).

== Academics ==
At the undergraduate level, the course of study is divided between general academics and study specific to teaching. The academic departments cover most of the recognized specializations of public-school teaching, namely: Computer Education, English Education, Elementary Education, Practical Arts Education, Fine Arts Education, Music Education, Physical Education, Science Education, Mathematics Education, Social Studies Education, Korean Education, and Ethics Education. Unlike other shifts where most timetables in Korea have already been set and cannot register for classes, Chinju (Jinju) National University of Education is free to register for classes from the first grade.

== History ==
The main school was approved as a public school in Gyeongsangnam-do on March 31, 1923 and opened on April 24. In addition, in 1940, according to the policy of converting a public school into a government office, it was reorganized into a government-run Jinju School of Education on April 1. At that time, the main school was located at Jinju Agricultural School (currently Gyeongsang National University Chilam Campus) and has been in existence since it was moved to its current location in 1942. In 1961, a bill was enacted to train elementary school teachers at the level of beginner universities, and the opening ceremony and admission ceremony were held on March 8 in accordance with the establishment of Jinju Education University (Revised Ordinance No. 1133). In accordance with Article 120 of the 1983 Education Act and Paragraph 2 of the Supplementary Provisions of the same Act, this school was promoted to a four-year education university. In 1993, the name was changed from Jinju National University of Education to Jinju National University of Education in accordance with the National School Establishment Decree (Presidential Decree No. 13859) and it is still called the official name of the school to this day. The current local name is Jinju, but the name of the school is CNUE(Chinju National University of Education) because Jinju was written Chinju in the past, influenced by Revised Romanization of Korean(RRK). In the 2000s, various facilities were newly built, including the auditorium (2002), the second dormitory (2004), the affiliated elementary school multipurpose auditorium and swimming education center (2005), and the teacher education center (2007). The first lecture building, which is most frequently used by the members of the school, was newly built in 2011. Following Dr. Information-ju, the 5th president in 2007, Dr. Kim Sun-yu, the 6th president in 2011, and Dr. Choi Moon-sung, the 7th president in 2016, the 8th president Yoo Gil-han, who has been in office since 2020, marks a historic 100th anniversary.

== Mascot 'CUE-T' ==
Jinju National University of Education (hereinafter referred to as Jinju National University of Education) has produced and released an emblem, mascot, and catchphrase to celebrate the 100th anniversary. The unveiled emblem is a design that emphasizes the 100th anniversary based on orange, the symbolic color of Jinju National University of Education, where the number 1 means torch and the number 00 connects the two to indicate infinity. Although it is now the 100th anniversary, it expresses social growth and the future creation of education through education that will continue forever. The catchphrase was selected through a contest to represent the meaning and values of the 100th anniversary of the opening of Jinju National University of Education in a core and implicative way and to show the vision of the future. The best catchphrase is "100 Years of Roots, Dream of Future Education!" It contains the meanings of realizing future educational dreams at Jinju National University of Education with a deep history of 100 years and the specific meanings of specialization (D), recovery (R), empathy (E), attitude (A), and change (M). The new mascot is a motif of a deer, a professor of Jinju National University of Education, and the horn of the deer represents CUE, an abbreviation for alternating school, and the character name is CUE-T, which combines CUE and Teacher of Jinju National University of Education. Deer is an animal with the character of a strong and strong in history, which well implies the role and value of Jinju University of Education as a teacher training university with the right personality and activity, and will be expressed in various promotional materials by adding familiar images.

== See also ==
- List of national universities in South Korea
- List of universities and colleges in South Korea
- Education in Korea
