= Sinan Joo clan =

Korean clan from Anhui, China

- Country: Korea
- Origin: Anhui, China, Song dynasty
- Founder: Joo Jam
- Connected members: Ju Ji-hoon; Joo Sang-wook; Nongae; Chu Yo-han

Sinan Joo clan (Korean: 신안 주씨; Hanja: 新安 朱氏) is one of the Korean clans. Their Bon-gwan is in Anhui, China. According to the research held in 2000, the number of Sinan Joo clan’s member was 151,227. Their founder was Joo Jam (Zhu Qian, 朱潛) who was a great grandchild of Zhu Xi. He worked at the Hanlin Academy as a Taixue Boshi (Hanja: 太學博士) or Erudite of the National University during the Song dynasty, but exiled himself to Goryeo with his family and colleague in 1212 because he feared for his physical safety before the Song dynasty’s collapse to the Mongols. He became the founder of the Sinan Joo clan.

== See also ==
- Korean clan names of foreign origin
