= Jinju =

City in South Gyeongsang, South Korea

- Municipal City
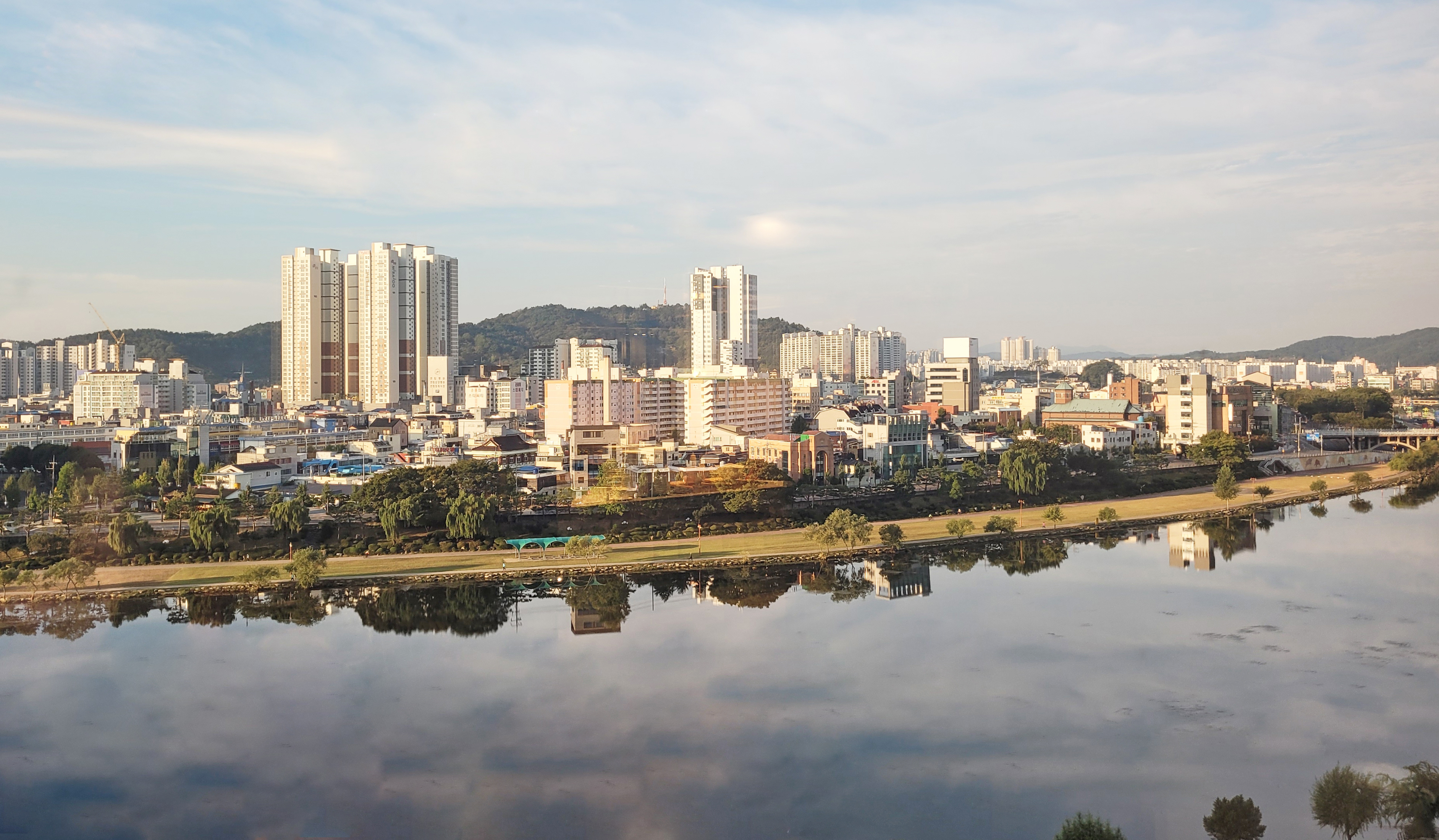
- Jinju and Nam River

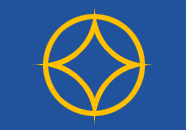
- Flag Emblem of Jinju

- Location in South Korea
- Coordinates: 35°12′N 128°05′E
- Country: South Korea
- Region: Yeongnam
- Administrative divisions: 1 eup, 15 myeon, 21 dong

Government
  - Type: Mayor-Council
  - Mayor: Cho Kyu-il (Liberty Korea)
  - Members of National Assembly: Jinju A: Park Dae-chul (Liberty Korea); Jinju B: Kang Minkuk (People Power Party)

Area
  - Total: 712.86 km^{2} (275.24 sq mi)

Population (September 2025)
  - Total: 337,529
  - Density: 473.49/km^{2} (1,226.3/sq mi)
  - Dialect: Gyeongsang
- Postal code: 52600~52889
- Area code: (+82)-55- 7xx
- Website: www.jinju.go.kr/english.web

Korean name
- Hangul: 진주시
- Hanja: 晉州市
- RR: Jinju-si
- MR: Chinju-si

Jinju (Korean: 진주; Korean pronunciation: [tɕin.dʑu]) is a city in South Gyeongsang Province, South Korea. It was the location of the first (1592) and second (1593) Sieges of Jinju by Japanese forces during the Imjin War. The Republic of Korea Air Force Education and Training Command is located in the eastern part of the city. There are cultural-historical tourist attractions in Jinju such as Jinju Fortress, the Jinju National Museum, and the Nam-gang Prehistoric Site Museum.

== History ==
Jinju was an ancient city of Goryeonggaya in the Gaya Era. This city was called 'Geoyeolseong' of Baekje during the Three Kingdom Era, and was called 'Geoyeolju', 'Cheongju', and 'Gangju' during the Unified Silla Era. Name of this city was changed into 'Jinju' for the first time in 940, the 23rd year of King Taejo of the Goryeo Dynasty. It became 'Jinju-mok', one of 12 moks (local administrative units in Goryeo and Joseon Dynasty) in the 2nd year of King Seongjong (983).

The second siege of Jinju during the Japanese invasion of Korea ended in the deaths of the entire garrison and a substantial portion of the population. Korean accounts mention that the death toll at Jinju was 60,000. According to Japanese accounts, they had sent 20,000 heads back to Japan after their victory.

In the 33rd year of King Gojong of the Joseon Dynasty (1896), administrative district of the nation was reorganized with 13 provinces. At that time Jinju began to belong to Gyeongsangnam-do, and became capital town of Gyeongsangnam-do. And provincial governor started to reside in Jinju. On April 1, 1925, Busan replaced Jinju as provincial capital.

On August 15, 1948, the government of the Republic of Korea was established and 'the local self-government system' was started. At that time, Jinju-bu was raised to Jinju-si (city) and started to have mayor of the city. On January 1, 1995, in accordance with 'the Law pertaining to the establishment of Urban-Rural Integrated City', Jinju-si and Jinyang-gun became extinct and were merged into one integrated Jinju-si (city).

== Population ==
At just over a third of a million, Jinju is a relatively small city by Korean standards. The annual growth of the population is 0.4% since 1995. People between the ages of 20 and 29 represent 17.5% of the city's total population, and justify the city's long-standing reputation as an educational city. The senior population (65 years or older), representing 7.6% of the city's total population, is higher than the provincial average (6.8%).

== Culture ==
=== Festivals ===
There are cultural events held in Jinju every year. Among these are the Jinju Namgang Yudeung Festival which is held in October for approximately ten days, involving lanterns floating on the Nam River to commemorate the deaths of Koreans in the Imjin War (1592–1598). Other major festivals include: the Nongae Festival, the Korea Drama Festival, the Gaecheon Arts Festival and the Jinju National Bullfighting Contest.

The annual Nongae Festival, held in May commemorates and celebrates the legend of the patriotic gisaeng (professional Korean entertainer) Nongae's patriotic suicide-assassination of a Japanese general together with the deaths in the battle of Jinju Castle during the Imjin War. The festival features a reenactment of Nongae's suicide below Chokseongnu (Jinju castle pavilion) on the banks of the Nam River.

Gaecheon Arts Festival is annually held from October 3 to 10, around the time of Gaecheonjeol (National Foundation Day).

The Jinju National Bullfighting Contest is Korea's oldest bullfighting event and is hosted in a purpose-built sports arena near Jinyang lake.

The 2023 Asian Weightlifting Championships was held in Jinju.

=== Cuisine ===
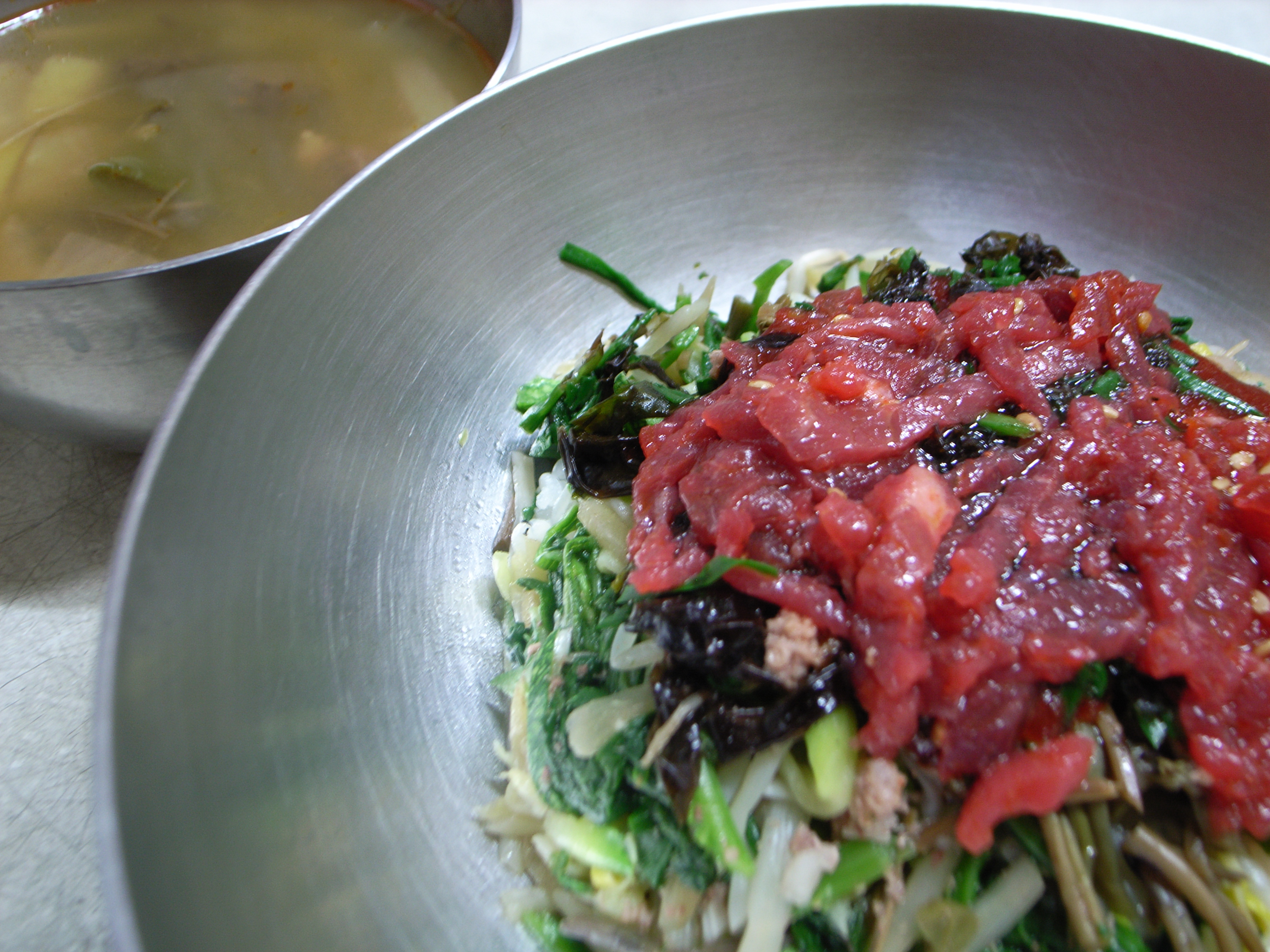
Jinju bibimbap

Local dishes include the Jinju bibimbap, which unlike most bibimbaps contains yukhoe, raw beef and sesame oil. Namgang (Nam River) grilled eel (minmul jangeo) is also caught locally and served in restaurants overlooking the river. A spicy pepper version of the Korean side dish pajeon (scallion pancake) known by its colloquial name jijimi is made, sometimes alongside a bowl of local rice wine makkeolli.

Cheonhwang Sikdang, founded in the city in 1927, is among the oldest active restaurants in South Korea.

== Education ==
Jinju is an educational city and home to Gyeongsang National University and Chinju National University of Education, Gyeongnam National University of Science and Technology. It is also home to International University of Korea, catering mostly to foreign students. It also has a number of community colleges that serve the local area. Jinju's high schools have a wide catchment area, reaching beyond the city limits to attract students from surrounding towns such as Sacheon, Hadong, and Sancheong.

Universities

Public	Private
Gyeongsang National University	International University of Korea
Chinju National University of Education	Yonam Institute of Technology
Gyeongnam National University of Science and Technology	Jinju Health College
Korea Polytechnic VII—Jinju Campus	

== Economy ==
Jinju was named as one of several 'enterprise cities' by the South Korean government which had supported Jinju as a hub of bio-industrial technological innovation since December 2000. The government provided 5 billion won in support from 2000 to 2004 for biological and chemical material industries. There are 618 manufacturing companies (11,806 employees), 1 local industrial complex and 4 rural industrial complexes as part of an integrated urban and rural city. Jinju Hyeoksin Dosi (New Innovation City) established by President Roh Moo-hyun with headquarters of vast LH Corporation (State-run Land & Housing corp Toji Jutaek gongsa) and Namdong Thermal Power. Namdong Thermal Power is one of 5 thermal power subsidiaries: Nambu (Southern) Thermal in Busan, Dongseo Thermal in Ulsan, Seobu (Western) in Taean, Jungbu (Central) in Boryeong, Chungnam of Korea Monopoly Utility Co. of the giant Kepco in Naju of Gwangju metro head office.

=== Silk industry ===
Silk has long been made in Jinju, and silk factories in the city today produce around 70% of the Korea's silk. Jinju silk has a soft texture.

== Transportation ==
The main highway in Jinju is National Highway 10 or Namhae Expressway.

The closest airports to Jinju are Sacheon Airport (domestic) and Gimhae International Airport.

Jinju is served by passenger rail service at Jinju Station along the Gyeongjeon Line.

== Climate ==
Climate data for Jinju (1991–2020 normals, extremes 1969–present)
Month	Jan	Feb	Mar	Apr	May	Jun	Jul	Aug	Sep	Oct	Nov	Dec	Year
Record high °C (°F)	17.5 (63.5)	23.3 (73.9)	25.2 (77.4)	29.0 (84.2)	37.0 (98.6)	35.1 (95.2)	39.0 (102.2)	39.9 (103.8)	35.8 (96.4)	30.2 (86.4)	27.0 (80.6)	19.6 (67.3)	39.0 (102.2)
Mean daily maximum °C (°F)	7.2 (45.0)	9.6 (49.3)	14.2 (57.6)	19.9 (67.8)	24.6 (76.3)	27.4 (81.3)	29.6 (85.3)	30.6 (87.1)	26.9 (80.4)	22.3 (72.1)	15.6 (60.1)	9.2 (48.6)	19.8 (67.6)
Daily mean °C (°F)	0.3 (32.5)	2.6 (36.7)	7.3 (45.1)	12.9 (55.2)	18.0 (64.4)	21.8 (71.2)	25.3 (77.5)	25.9 (78.6)	21.4 (70.5)	15.0 (59.0)	8.2 (46.8)	2.1 (35.8)	13.4 (56.1)
Mean daily minimum °C (°F)	−5.5 (22.1)	−3.7 (25.3)	0.6 (33.1)	6.0 (42.8)	11.6 (52.9)	17.2 (63.0)	21.9 (71.4)	22.2 (72.0)	16.7 (62.1)	8.9 (48.0)	2.0 (35.6)	−3.8 (25.2)	7.8 (46.0)
Record low °C (°F)	−15.9 (3.4)	−14.3 (6.3)	−10.4 (13.3)	−4.2 (24.4)	1.6 (34.9)	8.0 (46.4)	13.3 (55.9)	12.1 (53.8)	5.9 (42.6)	−2.7 (27.1)	−8.0 (17.6)	−13.9 (7.0)	−15.9 (3.4)
Average precipitation mm (inches)	28.0 (1.10)	45.6 (1.80)	77.6 (3.06)	126.4 (4.98)	137.3 (5.41)	174.3 (6.86)	312.2 (12.29)	296.8 (11.69)	180.7 (7.11)	68.3 (2.69)	44.7 (1.76)	26.1 (1.03)	1,518 (59.76)
Average precipitation days (≥ 0.1 mm)	4.5	5.1	7.3	8.9	9.2	10.5	14.2	14.2	9.8	5.0	5.7	4.3	98.7
Average snowy days	2.8	2.1	0.9	0.0	0.0	0.0	0.0	0.0	0.0	0.0	0.3	1.1	7.2
Average relative humidity (%)	58.1	56.5	58.9	61.5	66.5	73.4	80.1	78.4	75.6	71.1	67.9	61.4	67.5
Mean monthly sunshine hours	194.6	191.0	210.5	215.0	225.8	169.4	155.0	173.7	167.3	210.7	184.6	194.9	2,292.5
Percentage possible sunshine	61.3	59.3	52.9	52.7	48.0	36.7	34.1	39.9	42.8	56.8	56.2	62.4	49.1
Source: Korea Meteorological Administration (snow and percent sunshine 1981–2010)

== Twin towns – sister cities ==
Jinju is twinned with:

- Eugene, Oregon, United States (1961)
- Kitami, Japan (1985)
- Winnipeg, Canada (1992)
- Xi'an, Shaanxi, China (2016)

=== Friendship cities ===
- Kyoto, Japan (1999)
- Matsue, Japan (1999)
- Omsk, Russia (2007)
- Zhengzhou, Henan, China (2000)

== Gallery ==
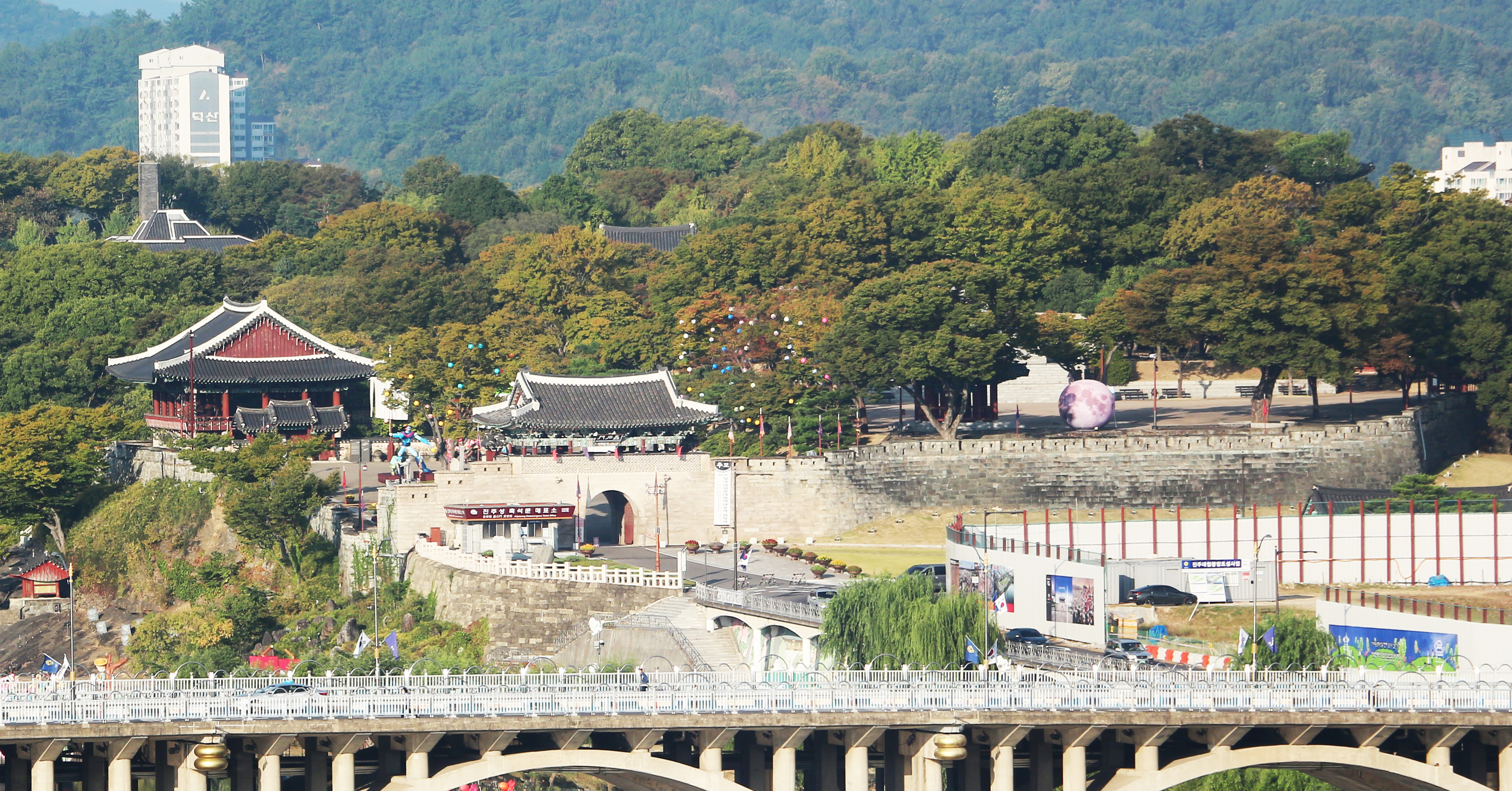
Jinju Fortress

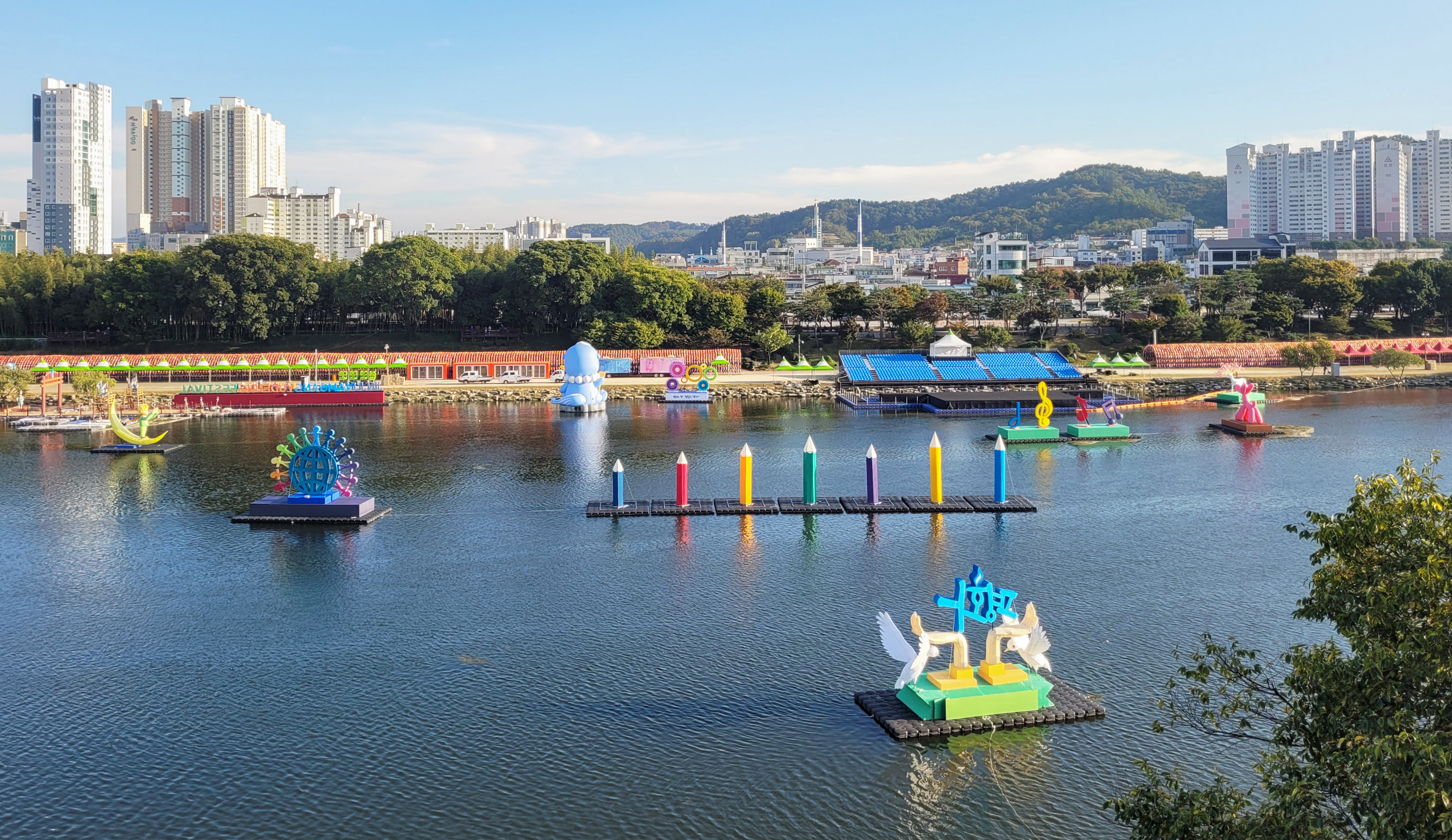
Jinju Namgang Yudeung Festival

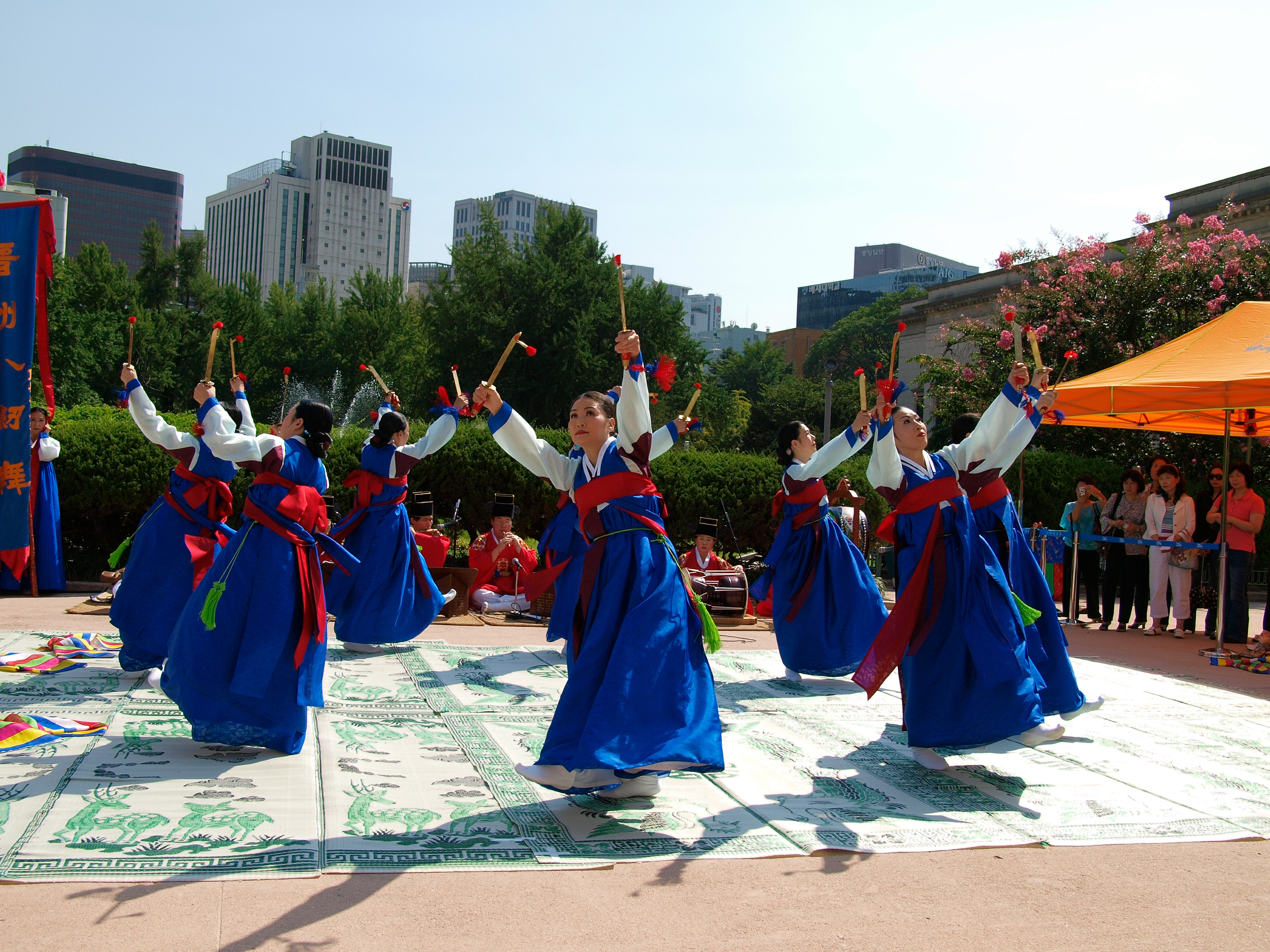
Jinju geommu

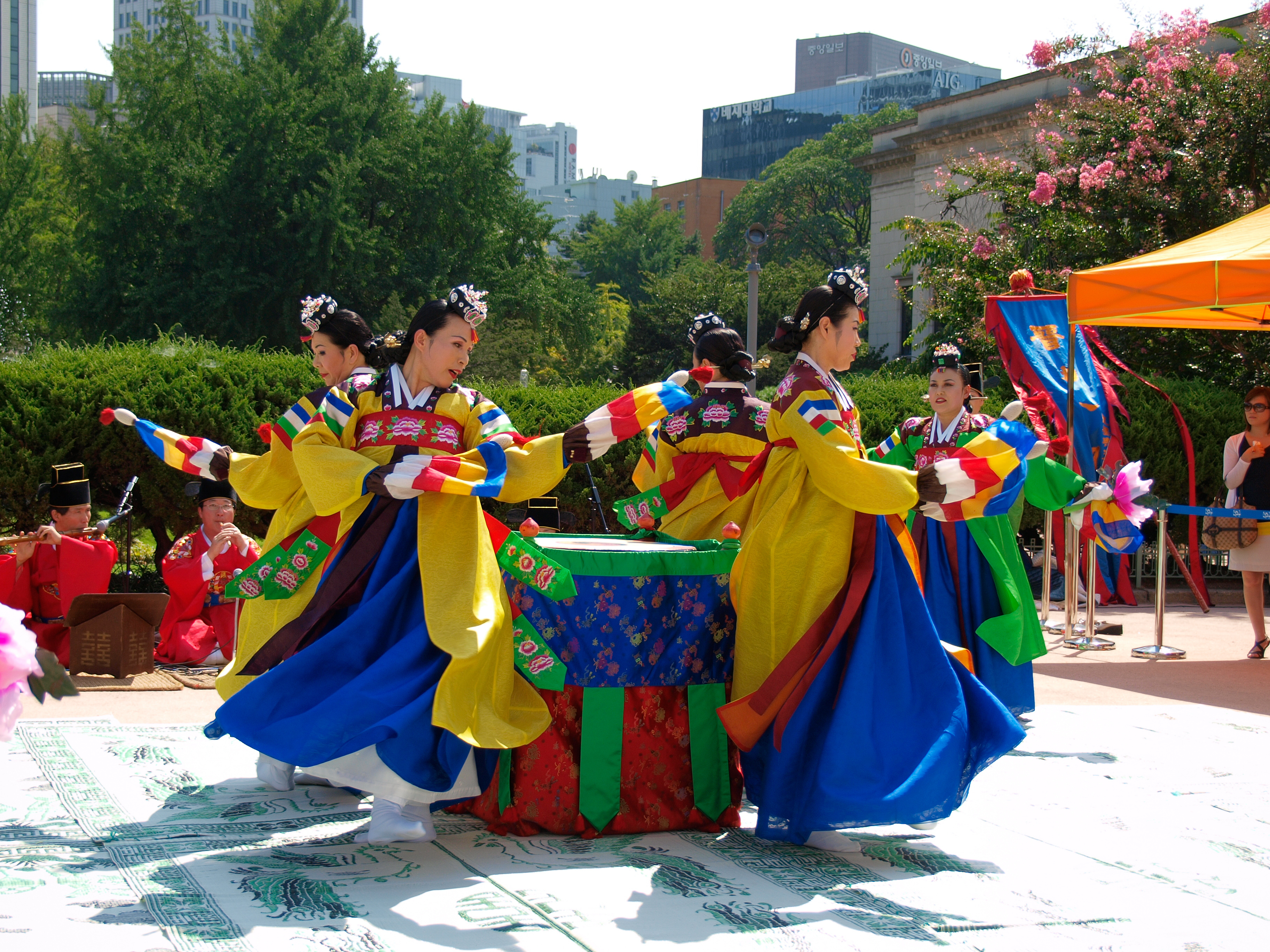
Jinju pogurakmu

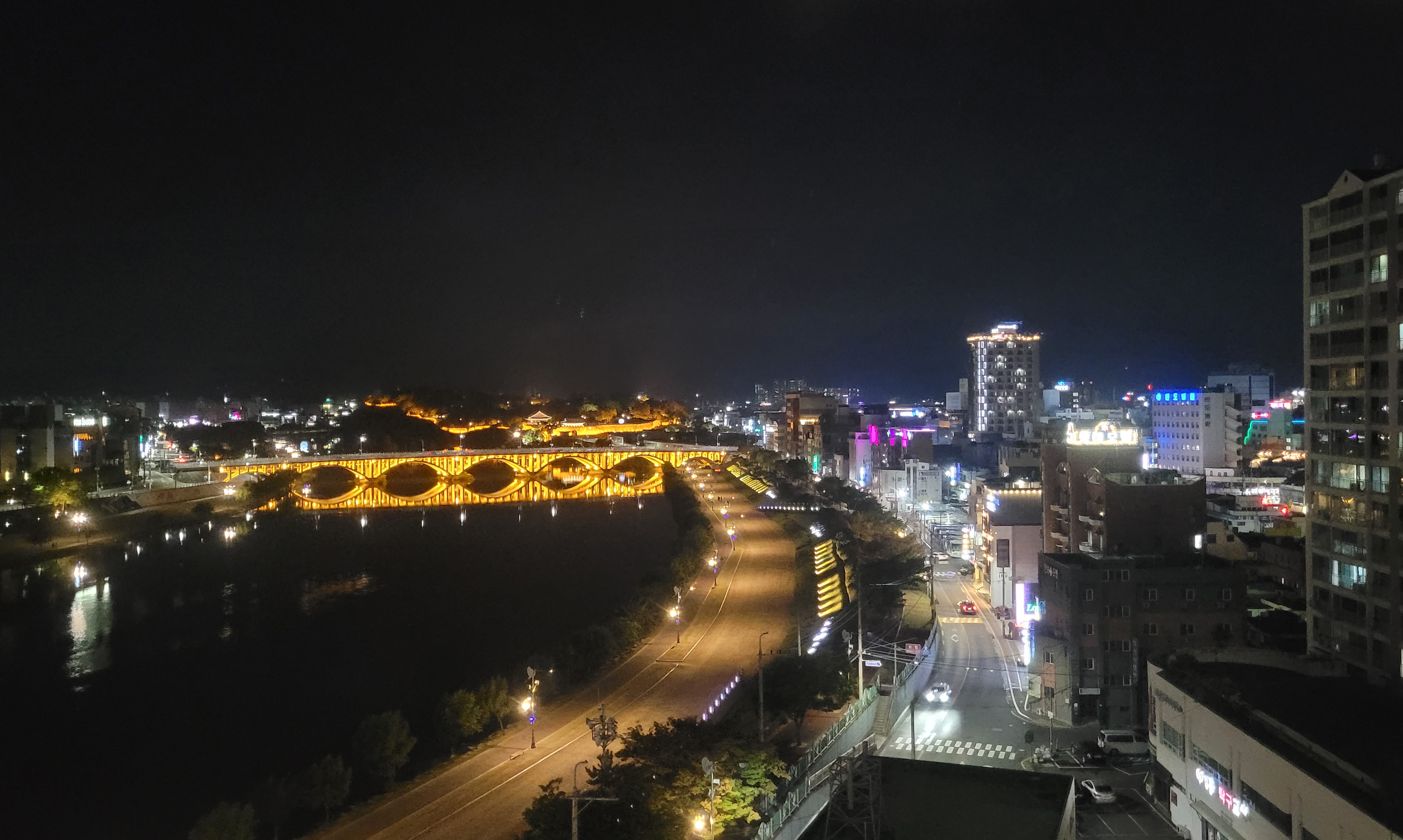
Jinju at night

== Notable people ==
- Non-Gae — gisaeng who in legend jumped off a cliff into a river with Keyamura Rokusake resulting in both of their deaths. (Originally from Jangsu County, North Jeolla Province)
- Yoo Yeon-seok — actor.
- Kang Ho-dong — host, comedian, former Korean traditional wrestler.
- Go A-ra — actress, model.
- Jung So-min — actress.
- ASTRO Rocky (Park Min-hyuk, 박민혁) — idol.
- ATEEZ Seonghwa (Park Seong-hwa, 박성화) — idol.
- ATEEZ San (Choi San, 최산) — idol, born in Jinju, raised in Namhae.
- GreatGuys Horyeong (Jeong Yeong-ki, 정영기) — idol.
- Oh Yeon-seo — actor.
- Song Young-chang — actor
- Gang Se-hwang (son of Kang Hyeon), a high ranking government official and representative painter, calligrapher and art critic, was born here in 1713.

== See also ==
- List of cities in South Korea
