= Hyeonpung Gwak clan =

Korean clan from Daegu

Hyeonpung Kwak clan
- Country: Korea
- Current region: Dalseong County
- Founder: Kwak Kyŏng
- Connected members: Gwak Kyung-keun; Kwak Chaeu
- Website: posan.kr

Hyeonpung Kwak clan (Korean: 현풍 곽씨; Hanja: 玄風 郭氏) is a Korean clan. Their Bon-gwan is in Dalseong County, Daegu. According to the research held in 2015, the number of Hyeonpung Kwak clan’s member was 166,608. Their founder was Kwak Kyŏng who was naturalized in Goryeo from Song dynasty. According to the epitaph coming out from Kwak Kyŏng’s grave in 1930, Kwak Kyŏng passed imperial examination in 1138, worked as the Vice-Director of the Chancellery (문하시랑평장사; 門下侍郎平章事; munha sirang p'yŏngjangsa) and Grand Master of the Palace with Golden Seal and Purple Ribbon (금자광록대부; 金紫光祿大夫; kŭmja kwangnok taebu), and became Prince of Posan (Hanja: 苞山君). After that, Kwak Kyŏng's descendants founded Hyeonpung Kwak clan and made Posan (Hanja: 苞山), Hyeonpung Kwak clan’s Bon-gwan.

== See also ==
- Korean clan names of foreign origin
