= Jinjuseong =

Walled city in Jinju, South Korea

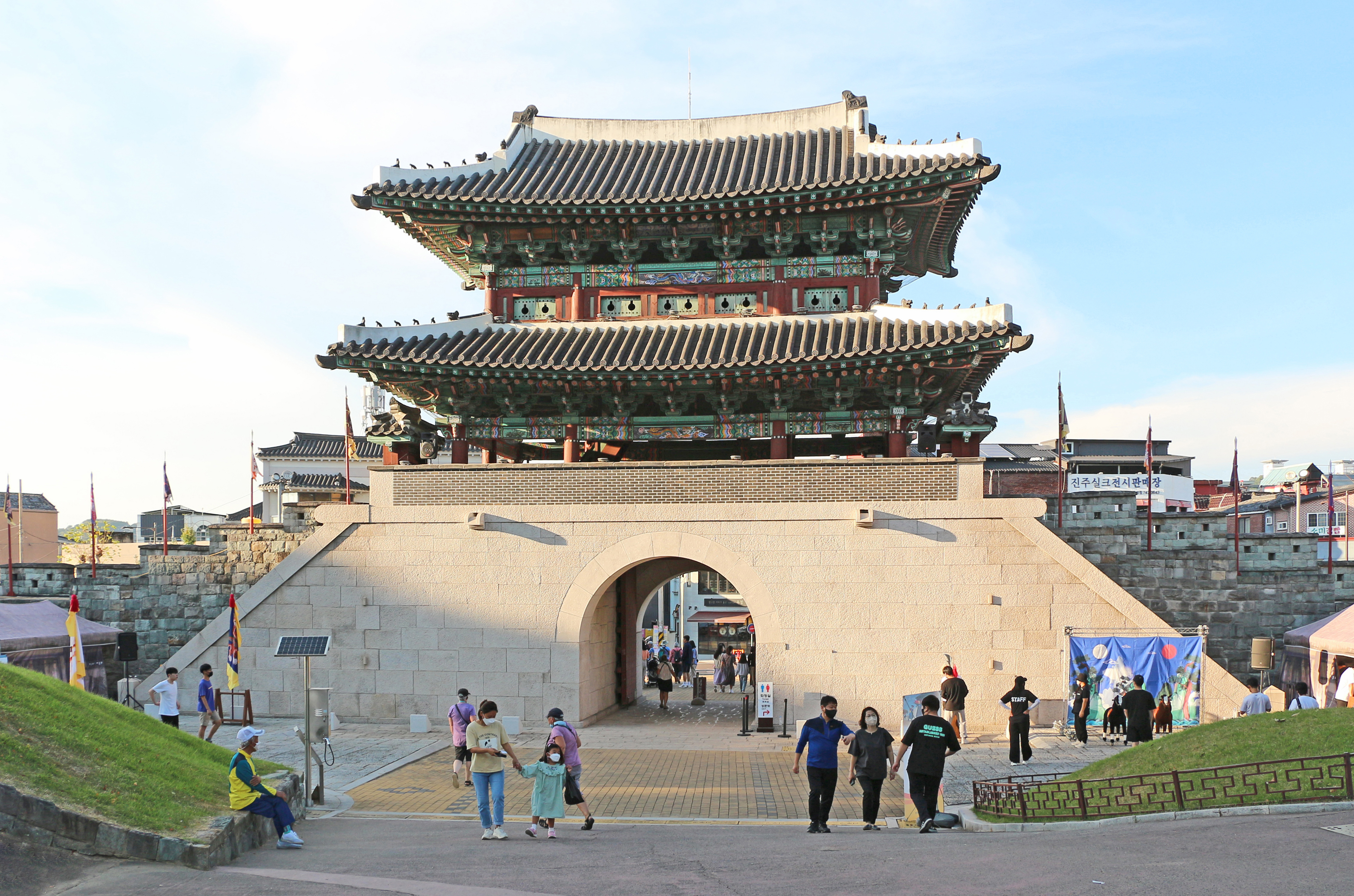
- Gongbukmun Gate
- Interactive map of Jinjuseong
- Location: Jinju, South Korea
- Coordinates: 35°11′24″N 128°4′24″E

Historic Sites of South Korea
- Official name: Jinjuseong Fortress
- Designated: 1963-01-21
- Reference no.: 118

Korean name
- Hangul: 진주성
- Hanja: 晋州城
- RR: Jinjuseong
- MR: Chinjusŏng

Jinjuseong (Korean: 진주성; Hanja: 晋州城), was a walled city now in Jinju, South Korea. It was designated Historic Site of South Korea No. 118 on 21 January 1963.

Located on the Nam River and close to the port of Busan, Jinju has long been a key city for invasions from Japan. Originally the walls were built with mud, but they were rebuilt with stones in 1377, and collapsed two years later due to Japanese sea pirates, and thus in the 5th year of King Woo of the Goryeo Dynasty (1379). with the walls being completed in 1380.

== Other uses ==
It was used as a provincial office for South Gyeongsang Province beginning in 1895, during the Joseon period, and through the Korean Empire period. It was used as the provincial office for Keishōnan Province during the Japanese colonial period until 1925.

== Restoration ==
In 1969, a restoration project was started with Chokseongmun being completed in 1972, and the fortress repair completed in 1975. Private houses within the city walls were completely removed by the end of 1984, and in 1992, the outer wall was repaired.

== Gallery ==
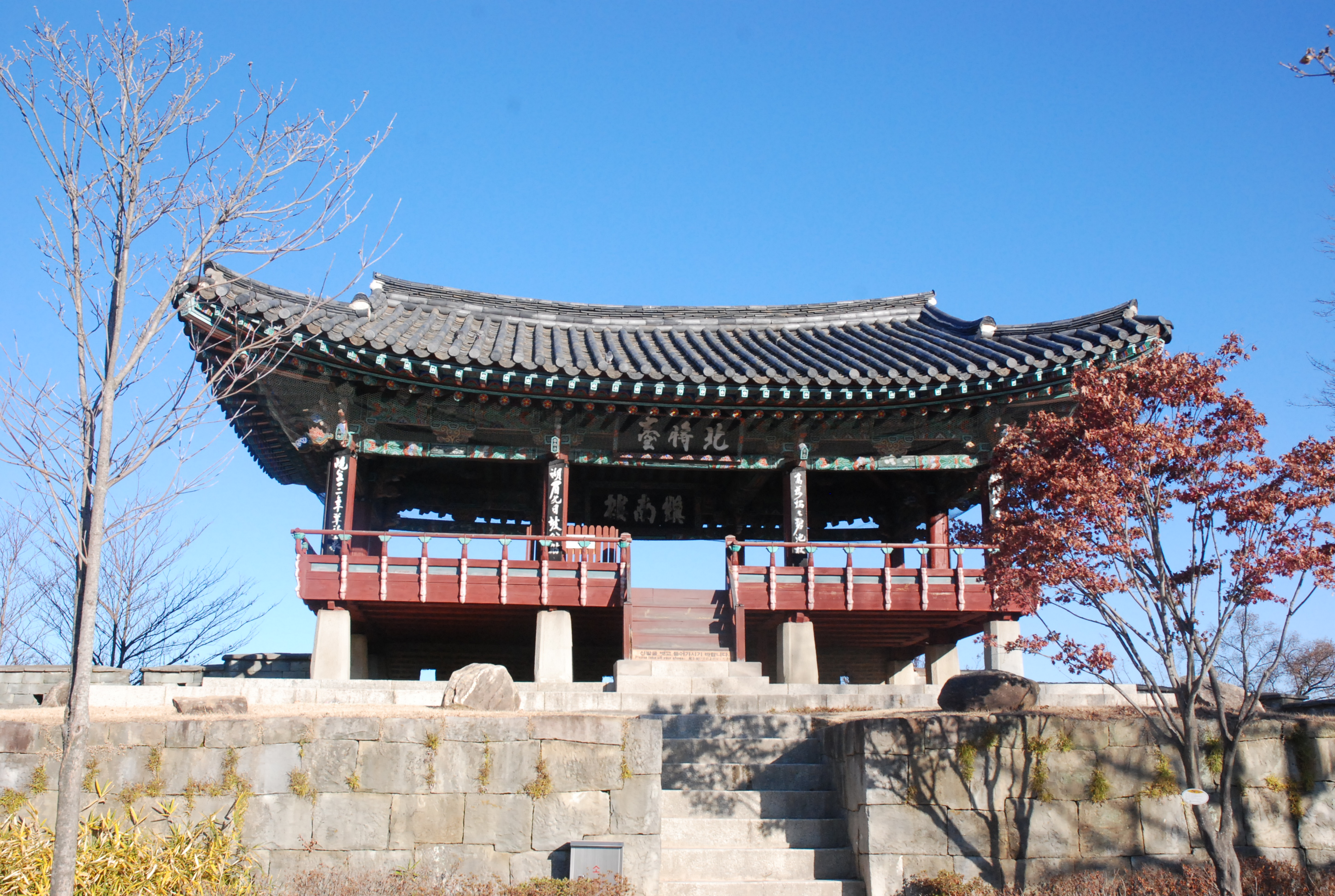
Jinju Castle Bukjangdae

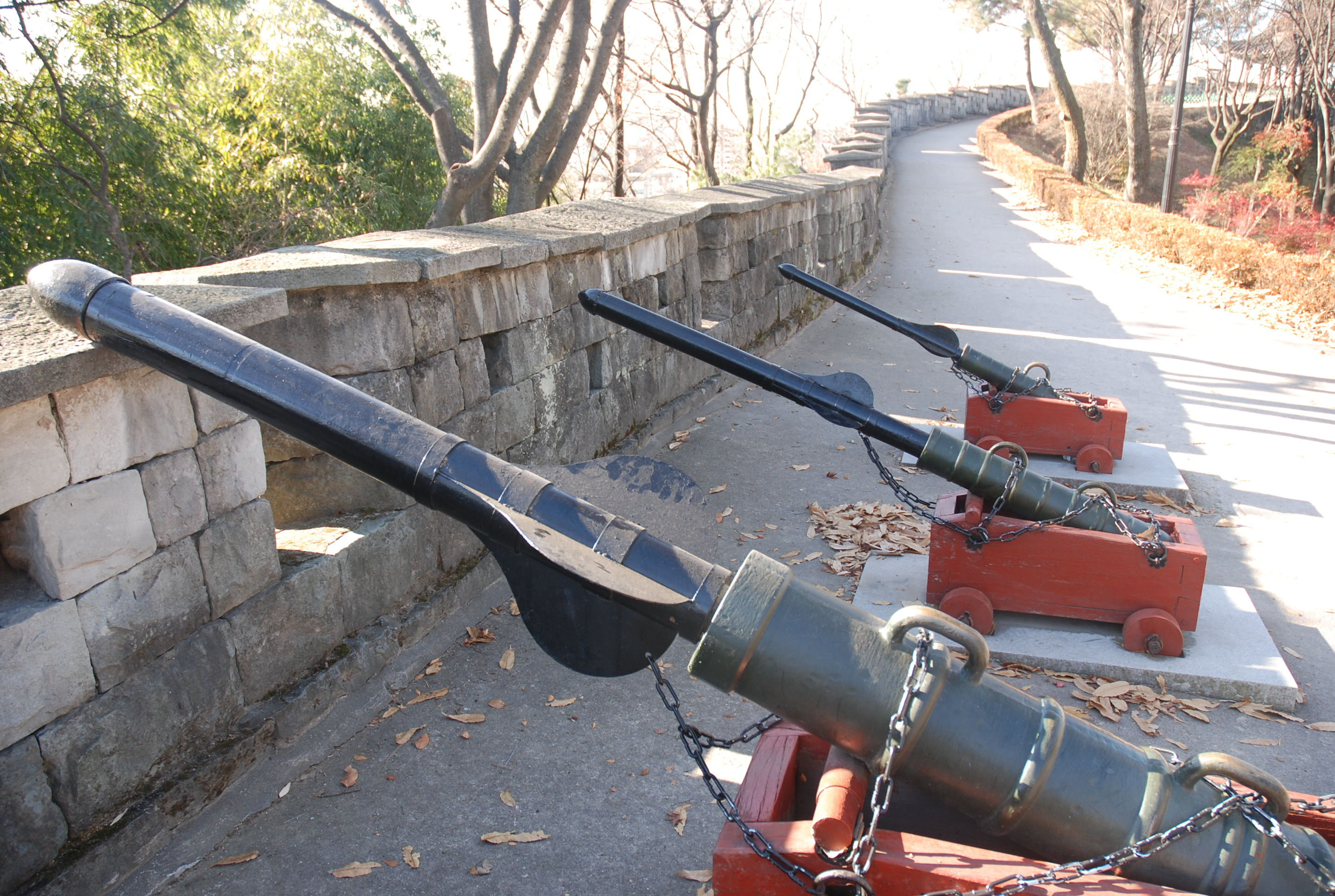
Chongtongs

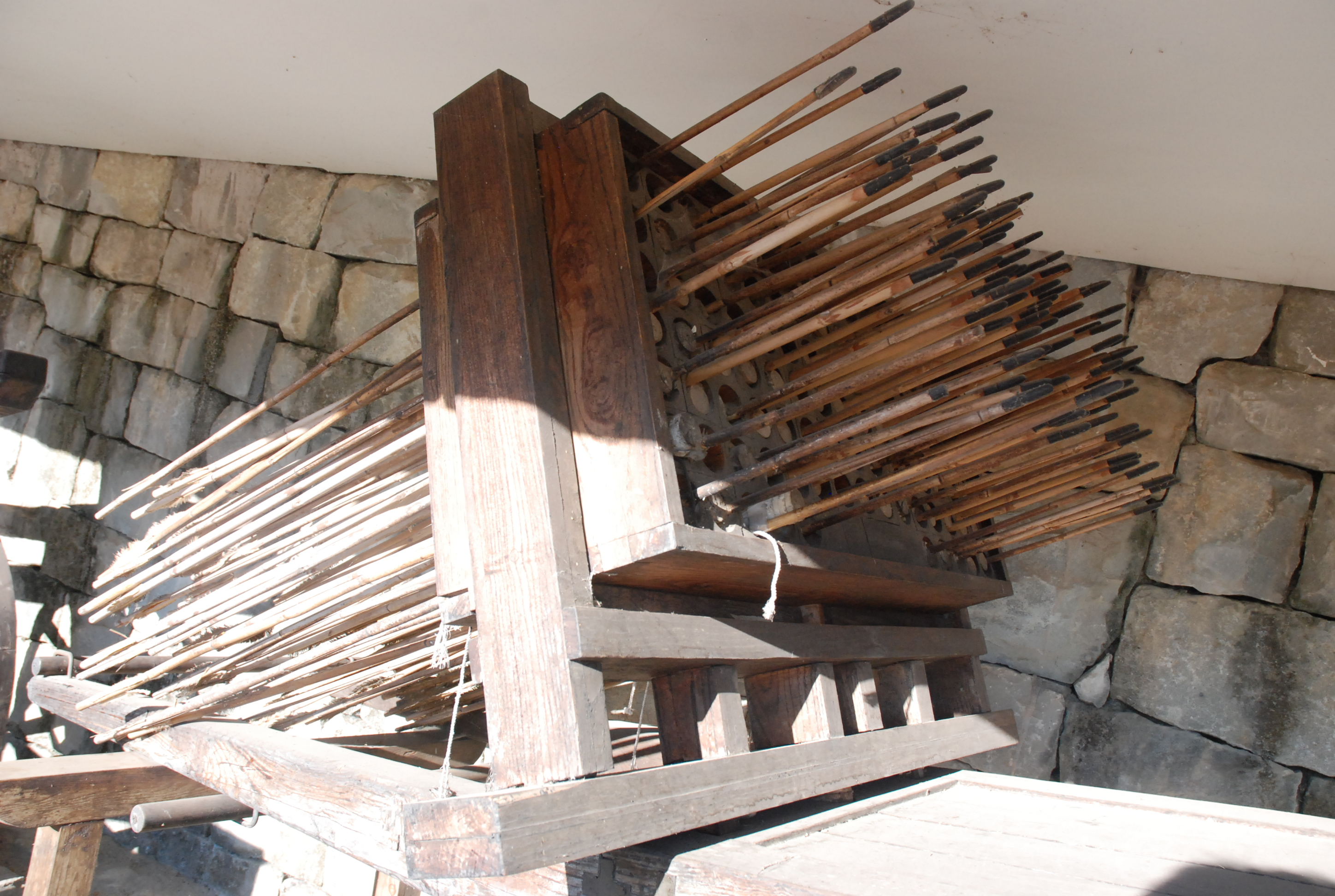
Hwacha-Shinkigeon Style
