= Kwak Chaeu =

Korean general (1552–1617)

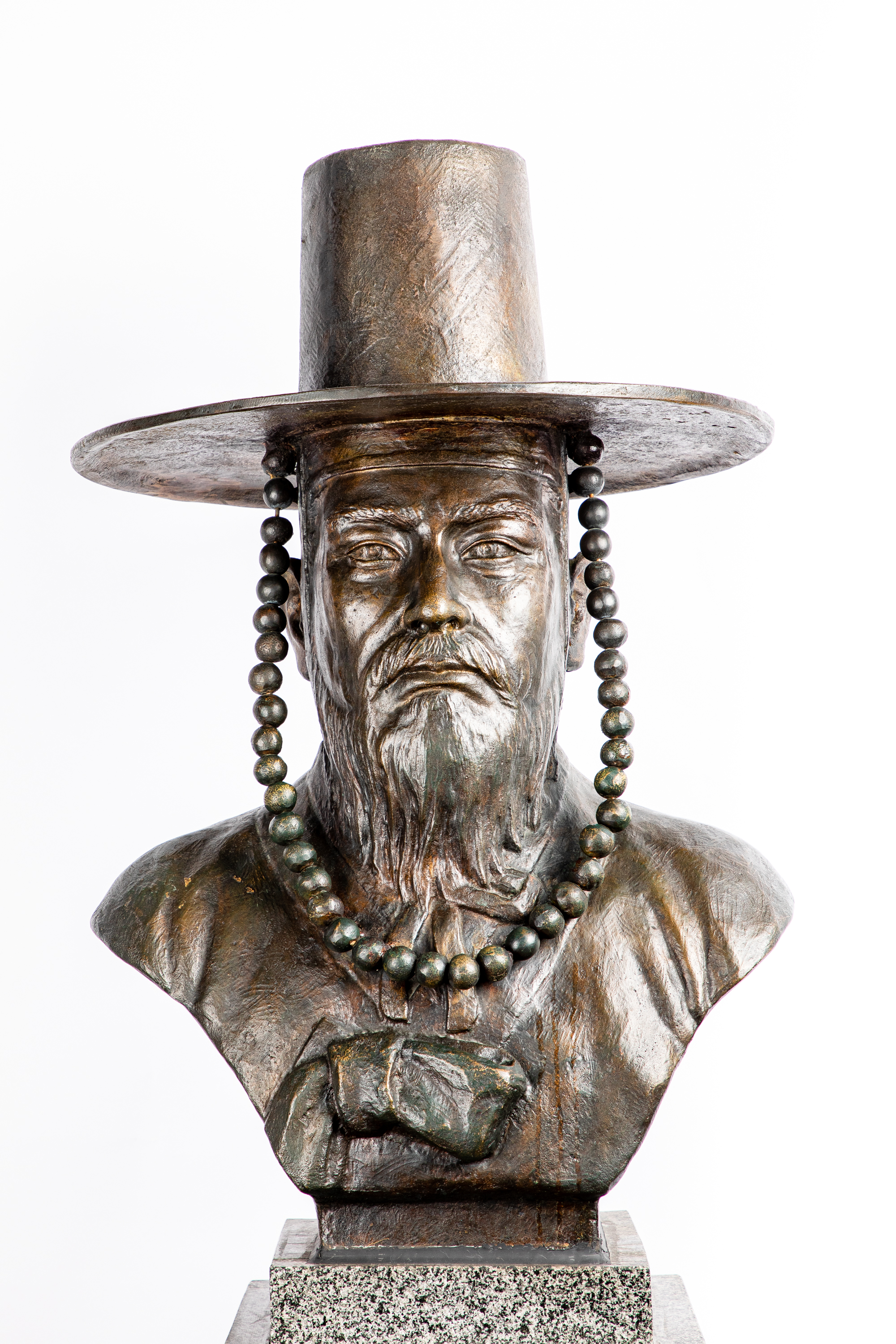
- Bust of Kwak Chaeu, War Memorial of Korea

Korean name
- Hangul: 곽재우
- Hanja: 郭再祐
- RR: Gwak Jaeu
- MR: Kwak Chaeu

Courtesy name
- Hangul: 계수
- Hanja: 季綬
- RR: Gyesu
- MR: Kyesu

Posthumous name
- Hangul: 충익
- Hanja: 忠翼
- RR: Chungik
- MR: Ch'ungik

Kwak Chaeu (Korean: 곽재우; Hanja: 郭再祐; 1552–1617 (Note: In the Korean calendar (lunisolar), Kwak was born on 28 August 1552 and died on 10 April 1617)) was a Korean military general from Uiryeong. He was called the "Red Robe General" (천강홍의장군; 天降紅衣將軍) after his habit of wearing a coat made of red silk. In 1592, nine days into the Imjin War, he formed a righteous army to fight against the Japanese army. He originally did not have an official position, but King Seonjo of Joseon granted him a government position.

== Background ==
Kwak was a yangban. He had passed the examination to enter the civil service when he was thirty-four, but was denied a post as his essay portion was harshly critical of the government. After that, he decided to give up taking the test and stay in hiding for life.

== Raising an army ==
In 1592, Japanese regent Toyotomi Hideyoshi invaded Korea. Kwak began raising a militia to defend the free parts of Kyongsang province from the invaders.

Kwak Chaeu disrupted Japanese supply lines around the Nakdong River in many guerrilla actions. Kwak also had the distinction of winning Korea's first land victory of the war in the Battle of Uiryeong. In part of a two-pronged offensive into Jeolla, Ankokuji Ekei led 6th division men from the south. Ankokuji needed to cross the Nam River to reach Uiryeong, an objective. He had his men find the shallowest parts of the river and mark them with stakes. While Ankokuji's army slept, Kwak's men moved the stakes to deeper sections of the river. When the crossing began, the Japanese soldiers foundered in the deep water, and Kwak's army attacked them. In multiple attempts to cross the river, Ankokuji suffered many losses, and was forced to abandon his attack on Uiryeong. The battle gave the Korean government respect for Kwak's abilities, and he was placed in command of the Korean forces in and around Uiryeong and the nearby Samga.

== Red robe ==
While Chaeu's robe is often simply described as red, Samuel Hawley further elaborates that the robe was "dyed in the first menstrual blood of young girls, which he believed suffused the garment with yin energy that would repel the yang energy of Japanese bullets." Chaeu ultimately survived the war and died of old age at an unknown later date.

== Legacy ==
There is a statue of Kwak Chaeu in Mangu Park in Daegu. Also, In Uiryeoung, the shrine Chungiksa enshrines Kwak Chaeu and seventeen of his subordinates.

== Family ==
- Father
  - Kwak Wŏl (곽월; 郭越; 1518 – 6 August 1586)
- Mother
  - Biological - Lady Kang of the Jinju Kang clan (진주 강씨)
  - Step - Lady Hŏ of the Gimhae Heo clan (김해 허씨; ?–1597)
- Siblings
  - Older sister - Lady Kwak of the Hyeonpung Gwak clan (현풍 곽씨)
  - Older brother - Kwak Chaehŭi (곽재희; 郭再禧)
  - Older brother - Kwak Chaerok (곽재록; 郭再錄)
  - Younger half-brother - Kwak Chaeji (곽재지; 郭再祉)
  - Younger half-brother - Kwak Chaegi (곽재기; 郭再祺; 1573–1649)
  - Younger half-sister - Lady Kwak of the Hyeonpung Gwak clan (현풍 곽씨)
- Spouse
  - Lady Kim of the Sangju Kim clan (상주 김씨; 尙州 金氏)
- Issue
  - Son - Kwak Yŏng (곽영; 郭濚)
  - Son - Kwak Hwal (곽활; 郭活)
  - Daughter - Lady Kwak of the Hyeonpung Gwak clan (현풍 곽씨)

== See also ==
- Siege of Jinju (1592)
- Japanese invasions of Korea (1592–1598)
