= Princess Gyeongsuk =

Princess Gyeongsuk 경숙옹주
- Princess of Joseon
- Born: 1439; Joseon
- Died: Before 1482; Joseon
- Burial: Princess Gyeongsuk Mausoleum, Songneung-ri, Jingeon-myeon, Yangju-gun, Gyeonggi Province
- Spouse: Kang Ja-Sun (m. 1454–1482)
- House: Jeonju Yi (by birth); Jinju Kang (by marriage)
- Father: Munjong of Joseon
- Mother: Consort Sa-Chik of the Yang clan

Princess Gyeongsuk (Korean: 경숙옹주; Hanja: 敬淑翁主; 1439–?) was a Joseon Dynasty Princess. She was the daughter of Munjong of Joseon and Consort Sa-Chik of the Yang clan. She was born as the only illegitimate issue of King Munjong who survived infancy and her mother, Lady Yang was the only Crown Prince's concubine recorded with the title Sa-chik (사칙; 司則), which was the old term for the title Su-chik (수칙; 守則).

== Biography ==
Princess Gyeongsuk was born in 1439 to King Munjong and Consort Sa-chik of the Yang clan. She was the younger half-sister of Princess Gyeonghye and the older half-sister of King Danjong. She had a younger sister in 1450, but she died a year later.

On 16 April 1454 (lunar calendar), during the 2nd year of King Danjong's reign, the 14-15 year old princess was arranged to marry 11-year-old Kang Ja-sun of the Jinju Kang clan, given the title of Lord Banseong (반성위). Sometime later, the princess suddenly died and left no issue. The cause of the princess's death nor death date is not known, but it is speculated to be before 1482.

Right after her death, her husband received the youngest daughter of County Governor Yi Gil-Sang (이길상, 李吉祥; 1398–?), Lady Yi of the Gyeongju Yi clan (1442–?), as his second wife in 1471 (2nd year of reign of King Seongjong). At this time, Yi Gil-sang had died but his widowed wife, Lady Seong of the Changnyeong Seong clan (창녕 성씨; 1399–?), had arranged and entrusted their daughter to Kang to be his wife.

But the rule for prince consorts or husbands of princesses was that remarrying was not allowed. So this often led to the widowed husband to adopt a male relative within his clan to have as their adopted son to continue his line, or get a concubine. But the latter would not serve a purpose to the husband as the children would not be recognized as the princess' children, but rather the concubine's as illegitimate.

In 1482, court officials had found her death suspicious and Kang's remarriage to Yi Gil-sang's daughter was also brought into question. This has caused arguments several times between the Yejo, Saheonbu, and Saganwon to the point these offices asked King Seongjong to investigate or to punish Kang's actions. But the king dismissed the pleads of the officials stating that the Princess had died before Kang took in Yi Gil-sang's daughter, and considered the status of Lady Yi to be that of a concubine to dismiss their argument.

Despite Lady Yi's status, the two would eventually have two children; one son, Kang Hyeong-dong, in 1480 and one daughter, Lady Kang, in 1488. Their daughter married Prince Deokwon's eighth son through his fourth wife, Princess Consort Changnyeong of the Changnyeong Seong clan; Yi Chong, Prince Sungseon (숭선군 이총; 1488–1544). Prince Deokwon was the eldest son of King Sejo with Royal Noble Consort Geun of the Seonsan Park clan.

But the debate of Kang's marriage continued during King Jungjong's reign until he finally put an end to this matter by acknowledging Lady Yi as Kang's second legal wife and not as a concubine, despite having a lower status and rank compared to the late Princess.

Her tomb was located in Songneung-ri, Jingeon-myeon, Yangju-gun, Gyeonggi Province (now San 78, Songneung-ri, Jingeon-eup, Namyangju, Gyeonggi Province, South Korean). Her husband, Kang Ja-sun, and his second wife, Lady Yi of the Gyeongju Yi clan, are also buried with the Princess. Although they were buried together, the Princess's tomb was below the area of Kang's reserved spot for his mound. While Lady Yi's spot was situated below the Princess's tomb, signifying that she is lower for her status when compared to the Princess.

== Family ==
- Father - King Munjong of Joseon (조선 문종; 15 November 1414 – 1 June 1452)
  - Grandfather - King Sejong of Joseon (조선 세종; 7 May 1397 – 30 March 1450)
  - Grandmother - Queen Soheon of the Cheongsong Sim clan (소헌왕후 심씨; 13 October 1395 – 19 April 1446)
- Mother - Royal Consort Sa-Chik of the Yang clan (사칙 양씨; 1423–?)
  - Legal mother - Queen Hyeondeok of the Andong Kwon clan (현덕왕후 권씨; 17 April 1417 – 10 August 1441)
- Sibling(s)
  - Unnamed younger sister (1450–1451)
- Husband - Kang Ja-sun (강자순,姜子順), Lord Banseong, Duke Gungan (반성위 공안공; 班城尉 恭安公; 1443–?) — No issue.
