= The Princess' Man =

2011 South Korean television series

- Promotional poster
- Genre: Romance; Historical
- Written by: Jo Jung-joo
- Directed by: Kim Jung-min; Park Hyun-suk
- Starring: Park Si-hoo; Moon Chae-won; Kim Yeong-cheol; Song Jong-ho; Hong Soo-hyun; Lee Min-woo; Lee Soon-jae
- Opening theme: "Vola" by Lee Ji-yong
- Country of origin: South Korea
- Original language: Korean
- No. of episodes: 24

Production
- Executive producer: Choi Ji-young (KBS)
- Camera setup: Multi-camera
- Running time: 60 minutes
- Production company: KBS Media

Original release
- Network: KBS2
- Release: 20 July – 6 October 2011

The Princess' Man (Korean: 공주의 남자; Hanja: 公主의 男子; RR: Gongjuui namja) is a 2011 South Korean television series, starring Park Si-hoo, Moon Chae-won, Kim Yeong-cheol, Song Jong-ho, Hong Soo-hyun and Lee Soon-jae. It's a historical drama depicting the forbidden romance between the daughter of Grand Prince Suyang and the son of Kim Jong-seo, Suyang's political opponent. It aired on KBS2 from July 20 to October 6, 2011, on Wednesdays and Thursdays at 21:55 (KST) for 24 episodes.

== Plot ==
Grand Prince Suyang attempts to build an alliance with Kim Jong-seo, the trusted official of his brother, King Munjong. He proposes a marriage between his eldest daughter, Lee Se-ryung, and Kim Jong-seo's younger son, Kim Seung-yoo. Learning of this, Se-ryung's curiosity regarding her prospective husband is piqued, and on hearing that Seung-yoo is going to take over as the tutor of her cousin, Princess Gyeonghye, she persuades her to swap places so that she can catch a glimpse of her intended. Her first impression is not favorable and she is convinced that he is an arrogant womanizer. Later, as she attempts to master her current obsession with riding a horse, Seung-yoo arrives in the nick of time to rescue her from being thrown off a precipice.

Meanwhile, Kim Jong-seo rejects Suyang's proposal because he knows the Grand Prince's aspirations regarding the throne and allies himself firmly with King Munjong. The King is impressed with Seung-yoo as a capable tutor and sees merit in having him as a son-in-law. He announces that Seung-yoo has been selected as a potential prince consort. Seung-yoo, who still believes Se-ryung is the Princess, is glad of the decision because of his growing feelings for her. Beginning to understand her passion to escape the confines of her cloistered life, he offers to teach her how to ride. Their blissful time together is cut short by assassins sent by Suyang to kill Seung-yoo as revenge against Kim Jong-seo. Seung-yoo is injured and as Se-ryung risks her life to save him, the Chief Magistrate of the capital's Police Bureau, Shin Myeon, chances to pass by and saves them. Shin Myeon also happens to be Seung-yoo's best friend, along with Jeong Jong, whose noble family has fallen on harsh straits. Even though Shin Myeon senses his friend's growing admiration for Se-ryung, he too finds himself drawn to the brave and beautiful girl. His dilemma grows when Grand Prince Suyang offers Se-ryung's hand in marriage to him in the hope of building an alliance with his politician father.

Se-ryung learns that Seung-yoo is being considered for the position of prince consort and is devastated. Gyeonghye understands the political import of marrying Seung-yoo and orders her to not meet Seung-yoo anymore, suspecting that the two are falling in love. However, Seung-yoo and Se-ryung meet outside the palace once again. Following their time together, Seung-yoo writes a letter to Se-ryung and sends it to the real Princess Gyeonghye, who, understanding that they met despite her orders, is furious. At the next lesson, she locks up Se-ryung and takes her place, thereby revealing the deception to Seung-yoo, but she hides Se-ryung's identity from him by calling her a palace maid who took her place.

The letter discarded by Gyeonghye falls into the hands of Suyang. Using the letter as evidence, he declares that Seung-yoo is unfit to be the prince consort and insinuates that he dishonored the Princess by meeting her outside the palace. When interrogated, Seung-yoo says he did not meet the Princess outside but hides Se-ryung's part in it to spare her danger. Learning of the danger to Seung-yoo's life, Se-ryung begs Gyeonghye to intercede for Seung-yoo. Despite her intercession, the penalty for Seung-yoo's transgression is death. Suyang discovers Se-ryung when she secretly visits Seung-yoo in prison and is horrified to learn of their dalliance. Relieved that Seung-yoo does not know who she is, he agrees to save Seung-yoo if she never meets him again and never reveals her identity to him. Kim Jong-seo, desperate to save his son, approaches Suyang for help and agrees to pay the humiliating price of resigning from his position. Seung-yoo's sentence is commuted to temporary exile. Jeong Jong is chosen as prince consort, bringing a drastic change in his fortunes. He is smitten with the Princess from the beginning; however, she detests him. Se-ryung's relationship with Gyeonghye is also strained, with the Princess blaming her cousin for all the misfortunes she has undergone.

King Munjong collapses on the day of his daughter's wedding and his health takes a turn for the worse. Seung-yoo is summoned back by his elder brother, in order to assist their father in safeguarding the interests of the King. Seung-yoo runs into Se-ryung on his return but coldly severs all ties with her. However, Se-ryung's concern for her cousin coupled with the fact that Jeong Jong is Seung-yoo's friend, forces the two to meet again. Both find it hard to repress their feelings and finally Seung-yoo declares his love for her. Meanwhile, at exactly the same time, King Munjong dies. Suyang and his cronies arrive at the palace, jubilant that they can now control the new King Danjong. However, their plans are thwarted by Kim Jong-seo, who was reinstated by the late King to protect his son from Suyang's machinations.

Furious, Suyang prepares to stage a coup against Kim Jong-seo. Se-ryung stumbles on the plot too late and is foiled in her attempts to warn Seung-yoo and his family. Supported by Shin Myeon, Suyang ruthlessly murders his opponents, including Seung-yoo's father and brother. Shin Myeon, believing that Seung-yoo is dead, stops the other men from beheading him claiming he wishes to do it himself. As he is about to bury him, Shin Myeon realizes that Seung-yoo is (barely) alive and attempts to kill him, but in the end turns around and leaves, giving Seung-yoo the chance to escape with his life.

Seung-yoo wakes up and walks into the city to find that his father had been beheaded. Reeling from his best friend's betrayal, he tries to kill Suyang, only to be shocked by the discovery that Se-ryung is his daughter. Seung-yoo is sentenced to death, but a last minute intercession by the young King saves his life and he is exiled to Ganghwa Island, along with the rest of Suyang's enemies. When Se-ryung visits him in prison on the eve of his exile, his fury gets the better of him and he nearly chokes her to death. Se-ryung admits her identity and begs him to survive, even if it is just so that he can kill her.

En route Ganghwa Island, the ship is sunk to ensure that none of Suyang's enemies survive. However, aided by a fellow prisoner, Jo Seok-joo, Seung-yoo manages to escape and return. Taking refuge at a gisaeng house owned by Seok-joo, Seung-yoo plots his revenge. Meanwhile, Se-ryung learns that Seung-yoo's ship sank. Despite her mourning, her parents fix the date of her wedding with Shin Myeon.

In an attempt to bait Suyang, Seung-yoo kidnaps Se-ryung on the day of her wedding. He is mercilessly cruel to her, and reveals her father's part in the sinking of the ship. Suyang shows up to claim his beloved daughter but he survives Seung-yoo's arrow because of his armor. Meanwhile, Shin Myeon shoots an arrow at Seung-yoo, which is intercepted by Se-ryung who takes the brunt of it. Shaken by her sacrifice, Seung-yoo is shell shocked and he has to be forcibly dragged away by Seok-joo and Noh-gyul.

Se-ryung is taken home and Shin Myeon is suspicious because she took the arrow on behalf of her kidnapper. The encounter with Seung-yoo changes Se-ryung's attitude towards her father and Shin Myeon, as she is now fully aware of the extent to which they will go for power. Seung-yoo reveals that he is alive to Jeong Jong, and starts assassinating those who were privy to his family's massacre. He leaves behind the alias of his deceased father, Great Tiger, at each site to stir fear among his enemies. Se-ryung's attempts to atone for her father's crimes gradually melts Seung-yoo's anger, especially when he learns that she saved the lives of his sister-in-law and niece. Suyang forces King Danjong to abdicate and takes the throne himself, becoming King Sejo. Se-ryung refuses to be conferred as princess and continues to bravely defy her father.

Seung-yoo gives up his vigilante assassinations at the behest of his former teacher, who urges him to join the larger cause of dethroning Sejo and restoring Danjong. Se-ryung inadvertently learns of the plot and is caught in a terrible dilemma. Saving her father comes at the cost of her love and vice versa. However, the rebellion that was led by the six scholars of the Hall of Worthies, including Seung-yoo's teacher, fails, leading to their deaths and the exile of Princess Gyeonghye and Jeong Jong.

Seung-yoo manages to escape, but Shin Myeon discovers his identity. King Sejo learns that Seung-yoo is alive and that Se-ryung may have had knowledge of the plot. The rift between father and daughter grows. In a symbolic move, Se-ryung cuts her hair and renounces her ties with her father. When she takes refuge in a temple after leaving the palace, Seung-yoo takes her with him to the gisaeng house, but she is forced to surrenders herself when Shin Myeon and his guards nearly tear apart the place. In his rage, King Sejo sentences her to become Shin Myeon's slave. Seung-yoo and his friends rescue her in the nick of time. Shin Myeon refuses to give up his quest to possess Se-ryung and follows the pair to Princess Gyeonghye and Jeong Jong's place of exile. Shin Myeon comes to learn that Jeong Jong is plotting yet another rebellion. He is arrested and executed, leaving behind a devastated and pregnant Gyeonghye.

The leaders with whom Seung-yoo continues the rebellion refuse to accept Se-ryung because of her link to King Sejo. Seung-yoo and Se-ryung pledge their love as husband and wife and agree to separate till the battle is over. However, when Shin Myeon plans to use Se-ryung as bait to lure Seung-yoo, she escapes and warns her husband. In the battle that follows, Shin Myeon is killed and Seung-yoo's side wins. Seung-yoo moves forward with his plan to assassinate the King and nearly succeeds, but for a momentary distraction caused by learning of Se-ryung's pregnancy. Seung-yoo is sent to prison and Se-ryung goes to see him, wanting her baby to at least know who their father is. Seung-yoo is close to death and Se-ryung accepts her fate. However, Se-ryung's mother orchestrates their escape.

Years later, Seung-yoo has become blind, but he lives a happy life with Se-ryung and their daughter. In the backdrop of their bliss, we see an aged King Sejo who has let go of his bitterness and who watches his daughter in secret.

== Cast ==
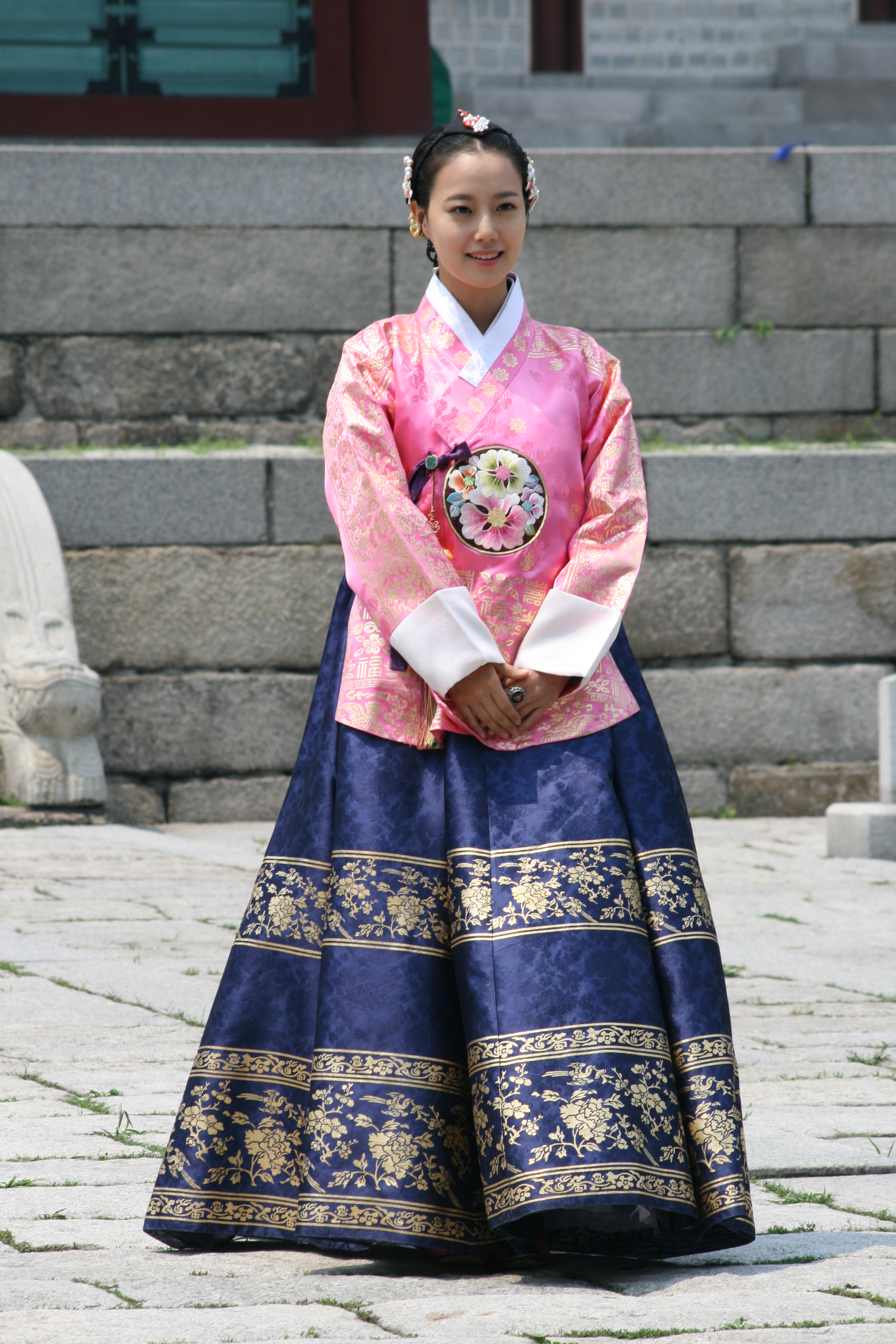
Moon Chae-won at a photoshoot for the series

=== Main characters ===
- Moon Chae-won as Lee Se-ryung
  - The eldest and favorite daughter of Grand Prince Suyang, she is a bright and sweet person, with an adventurous streak. She persuades her cousin, Princess Gyeonghye, to exchange places with her during a tutoring session with Kim Seung-yoo, upon learning of her father's initial plans to arrange her marriage with him. A harmless prank to sneak a peek at her intended husband spirals out of control as they fall deeply in love with each other, ignorant of the deep and deadly political enmity that slowly develops between their fathers.
- Park Si-hoo as Kim Seung-yoo
  - The younger son of Kim Jong-seo, he is a carefree scholar in the Royal Academy, whose main interests are having a good time with the ladies and spending time with his friends, Shin Myeon and Jeong Jong. He meets his match in the spirited Lee Se-ryung. As he falls harder for her, his love is put to the ultimate test when he learns that Se-ryung is not the Princess, but rather the daughter of his father's greatest enemy.
- Kim Yeong-cheol as Grand Prince Suyang
  - Younger brother of King Munjong, he has his eyes firmly fixed on the throne. He is a ruthless politician, who will not countenance anyone standing in his way. Lee Se-ryung, his eldest daughter, is his weakness, but when she falls in love with the son of his enemy, he has no compunctions in eliminating Kim Seung-yoo and his entire family.
- Hong Soo-hyun as Princess Gyeonghye
  - Lee Se-ryung's cousin and friend, she is King Munjong's only legitimate daughter. She is indulged by her father, but the sudden knowledge of her father's illness and Grand Prince Suyang's threat to her young brother destroys her sheltered and uncomplicated life. She finds herself trapped in an unwanted marriage with Jeong Jong, but as her uncle systematically destroys her allies one by one, she begins to find solace and comfort in her husband's love.
- Song Jong-ho as Shin Myeon
  - Chief Magistrate of the capital's Police Bureau, he enjoys a deep camaraderie with Kim Seung-yoo and Jeong Jong. When he saves Kim Seung-yoo and Lee Se-ryung from an attack by assassins, the girl's bravery arouses his interest. What begins as a crush on his best friend's lover has devastating consequences when his father strikes an alliance with Grand Prince Suyang and marriage is on the cards for both of them.
- Lee Min-woo as Jeong Jong
  - The gentle and perpetually debt-ridden friend of Kim Seung-yoo and Shin Myeon. His fortunes take a turn for the better and in an amazing twist of destiny, he finds himself as the prince consort. However, his new bride, helplessly carrying the burden of her father's illness and the danger to her brother's life, initially has no time or inclination for his love. Just as his relationship with Princess Gyeonghye begins to improve, his life is endangered in an attempt to resist Grand Prince Suyang.
- Lee Soon-jae as Kim Jong-seo
  - A brilliant general who serves as the Left State Councillor and King Munjong's most trusted advisor, he alienates Grand Prince Suyang when he accepts Princess Gyeonghye instead of Suyang's daughter as bride for his younger son. He pays the price of his misalliance with his life and the destruction of his family.

=== Supporting characters ===
- Um Hyo-sup as Yi Gae, former teacher of Kim Seung-yoo, Shin Myeon and Jeong Jong
- Heo Jung-kyu as Kim Seung-gyu, Kim Seung-yoo's elder brother
- Lee Joo-seok as Grand Prince Anpyeong
- Kim Seo-ra as Lady Yun, Grand Prince Suyang's wife
- Cha Min-ji as Yeo-ri
- Kwon Hyun-sang as Lee Soong, Lee Se-ryung's brother
- Seo Hye-jin as Lee Se-jung, Lee Se-ryung's younger sister
- Jung Dong-hwan as King Munjong
- Noh Tae-yeob as King Danjong
- Ban So-young as Eun-geum, Princess Gyeonghye's maid
- Lee Hyo-jung as Shin Suk-ju
- Lee Dae-yeon as Gwon Ram
- Yoon Seung-won as Prince Onyeong
- Kwon Tae-won as Min Shin
- Kim Ik-tae as Jo Geuk-gwan
- Kim Young-bae as Jun Gyun
- Choi Moo-sung as Ham-gwi
- Jung Jin as Chil-gap
- Jung Geun as Mak-son
- Lee Hee-do as Han Myung-hoe
- Moon Poong-ji as Eunuch Moon
- Lee El as Mae-hyang
- Jin Sung as Song Ja-beon
- Ga Deuk-hee as Lady Ryu, Kim Seung-gyu's wife
- Kim Yoo-bin as Kim Ah-kang, Kim Seung-gyu's daughter
- Yoo Ha-joon as Im Woon
- Hong Il-kwon as Grand Prince Geumseong
- Kim Roi-ha as Jo Seok-joo
- Yoon Jong-hwa as Jun Noh-gul
- Choo So-young as Cho-hee
- Choi Han-bit as Moo-young
- Lee Seul-bi as So-aeng
- Lee Hee-joon as Gong Chil-goo

== Ratings ==
Episode #	Original broadcast date	Average audience share			
Episode #	Original broadcast date	TNmS Ratings		AGB Nielsen	
Episode #	Original broadcast date	Nationwide	Seoul National Capital Area	Nationwide	Seoul National Capital Area
1	20 July 2011	9.3%	10.0%	10.2%	11.6%
2	21 July 2011	8.7%	10.1%	9.4%	11.3%
3	27 July 2011	9.7%	12.1%	11.7%	12.9%
4	28 July 2011	10.4%	12.2%	9.8%	11.2%
5	3 August 2011	14.4%	14.6%	17.0%	17.5%
6	4 August 2011	15.3%	16.3%	16.9%	18.2%
7	10 August 2011	13.9%	15.1%	17.4%	18.6%
8	11 August 2011	15.2%	17.0%	16.6%	16.7%
9	17 August 2011	16.9%	18.4%	19.2%	19.6%
10	18 August 2011	17.6%	19.0%	19.6%	19.7%
11	24 August 2011	15.7%	17.0%	18.6%	19.4%
12	25 August 2011	18.1%	19.6%	18.7%	19.3%
13	31 August 2011	17.7%	18.3%	19.7%	20.7%
14	1 September 2011	19.5%	21.8%	21.8%	23.0%
15	7 September 2011	19.2%	21.5%	21.8%	23.0%
16	8 September 2011	20.1%	20.9%	21.1%	21.6%
17	14 September 2011	21.7%	21.9%	24.6%	25.5%
18	15 September 2011	21.2%	23.3%	22.2%	23.2%
19	21 September 2011	20.1%	21.7%	22.1%	23.3%
20	22 September 2011	20.1%	22.3%	23.0%	24.3%
21	28 September 2011	19.8%	20.5%	22.7%	23.6%
22	29 September 2011	21.2%	22.4%	21.9%	22.5%
23	5 October 2011	22.9%	24.9%	23.6%	25.5%
24	6 October 2011	23.8%	25.8%	24.9%	25.8%
Average		17.2%	18.6%	18.9%	20.3%

== Awards and nominations ==
Year	Award	Category	Recipient	Result	Ref.
2011	Korean Culture and Entertainment Awards	Top Excellence Award, Actress (TV)	Moon Chae-won	Won	
2011	2011 KBS Drama Awards	Top Excellence Award, Actor	Park Si-hoo	Won	
2011	2011 KBS Drama Awards	Top Excellence Award, Actor	Kim Yeong-cheol	Nominated	
2011	2011 KBS Drama Awards	Top Excellence Award, Actress	Moon Chae-won	Won	
2011	2011 KBS Drama Awards	Excellence Award, Actor in a Mid-length Drama	Park Si-hoo	Nominated	
2011	2011 KBS Drama Awards	Excellence Award, Actor in a Mid-length Drama	Lee Min-woo	Nominated	
2011	2011 KBS Drama Awards	Excellence Award, Actress in a Mid-length Drama	Moon Chae-won	Nominated	
2011	2011 KBS Drama Awards	Excellence Award, Actress in a Mid-length Drama	Hong Soo-hyun	Won	
2011	2011 KBS Drama Awards	Best New Actor	Song Jong-ho	Nominated	
2011	2011 KBS Drama Awards	Best Supporting Actor	Kim Roi-ha	Nominated	
2011	2011 KBS Drama Awards	Best Young Actor	Noh Tae-yeob	Nominated	
2011	2011 KBS Drama Awards	Best Young Actress	Kim Yoo-bin	Nominated	
2011	2011 KBS Drama Awards	Popularity Award, Actor	Park Si-hoo	Won	
2011	2011 KBS Drama Awards	Popularity Award, Actress	Moon Chae-won	Won	
2011	2011 KBS Drama Awards	Best Couple Award	Park Si-hoo and Moon Chae-won	Won	
2011	2011 KBS Drama Awards	Best Couple Award	Lee Min-woo and Hong Soo-hyun	Won	
2012	Banff World Media Festival	Best Soap Opera and Telenovela	The Princess' Man	Nominated	
2012	Asian Television Awards	Best Drama Series	The Princess' Man	Won	
2012	48th Baeksang Arts Awards	Best Drama	The Princess' Man	Nominated	
2012	48th Baeksang Arts Awards	Best Actor – Television	Park Si-hoo	Nominated	
2012	48th Baeksang Arts Awards	Best Actress – Television	Moon Chae-won	Nominated	
2012	48th Baeksang Arts Awards	Best Director – Television	Kim Jung-min; Park Hyun-suk	Won	
2012	Seoul International Drama Awards	Golden Bird Prize for Series Drama	The Princess' Man	Won	
2012	Seoul International Drama Awards	Outstanding Korean Drama	The Princess' Man	Nominated	
2012	Seoul International Drama Awards	Outstanding Korean Actor	Park Si-hoo	Nominated	
2012	Seoul International Drama Awards	Outstanding Korean Actress	Moon Chae-won	Nominated	
2013	Monte-Carlo Television Festival	Outstanding International Producer (Drama Series)	Kim Jung-min; Park Hyun-suk; Lee Nah-jung	Nominated	
2013	Monte-Carlo Television Festival	Outstanding Actor in a Drama Series	Park Si-hoo	Nominated	
2013	Monte-Carlo Television Festival	Outstanding Actor in a Drama Series	Song Jong-ho	Nominated	
2013	Monte-Carlo Television Festival	Outstanding Actress in a Drama Series	Moon Chae-won	Nominated	
2013	Monte-Carlo Television Festival	Outstanding Actress in a Drama Series	Hong Soo-hyun	Nominated	
2013	New York TV Festival	Television Drama – Bronze World Medal	The Princess' Man	Won	

== International broadcast ==
On September 2, 2012, members of the cast, namely Park Si-hoo, Song Jong-ho and Hong Soo-hyun, attended a promotional concert at Tokyo International Forum to promote the airing of the series on Japanese satellite channel BNK-BS.

It aired in the Philippines on the GMA Network from November 19, 2012 until February 7, 2013.

It aired in Sri Lanka on TV Derana under the title Sihina Kumara (සිහින කුමරා) from March 2014.

It aired in Australia and New Zealand on eMedia Network's iON broadcasting service Lanka Vision, a broadcasting service aimed at Sri Lankan Australians and Sri Lankan New Zealanders, via a live and delayed feed from Sri Lankan network, TV Derana in 2014.

It aired in Kurdistan on Kurdsat under the title Seung Yoo (سۆنگ یو).

It aired in Thailand on Channel 7 under the title Jomnang Kabot Huajai (จอมนางกบฏหัวใจ) from July 30, 2015.

It aired in Chile on ETC TV under the title El Hombre De La Princesa in August 2018, dubbed in Spanish.

It aired in Peru on Willax TV under the title El Hombre De La Princesa in July 2019 and October 2020, dubbed in Spanish.

It aired in Colombia on Canal Capital under the title El Hombre De La Princesa in July 2026 and, dubbed in Spanish.
