= Chang Yŏngsil =

Korean inventor (1390–1442)

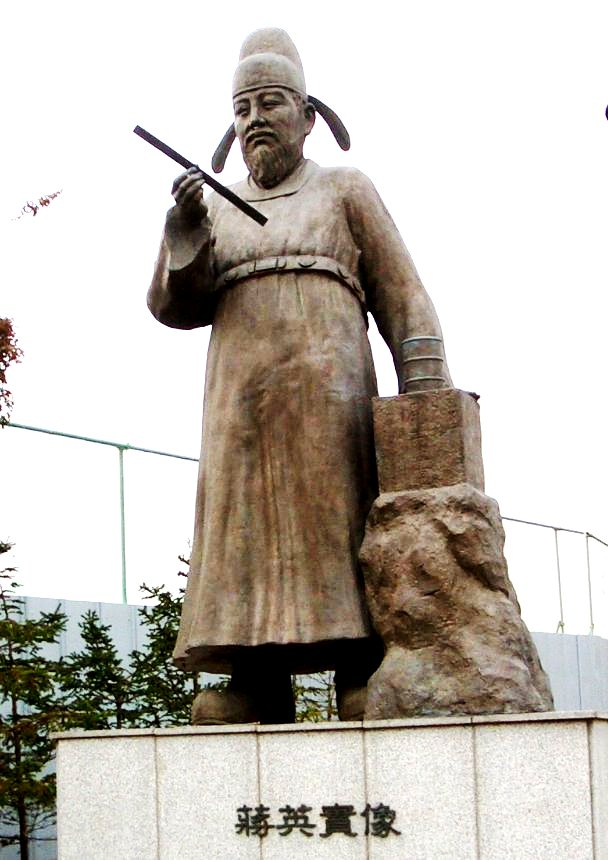

Korean name
- Hangul: 장영실
- Hanja: 蔣英實
- RR: Jang Yeongsil
- MR: Chang Yŏngsil
- IPA: [t͡ɕɐŋ jʌŋɕiɭ]

Chang Yŏngsil (Korean: 장영실; Hanja: 蔣英實; pronounced [t͡ɕɐŋ jʌŋɕiɭ]; ? – after 1442) was a Korean mechanical engineer, scientist, and inventor during the Joseon dynasty. He was born to a mother who was a government-registered courtesan (관기; 官妓) and a father of Yuan dynasty descent. Although Chang was born a nobi, King Sejong gave him a court-technician position in the royal court.

Chang's inventions, such as the ch'ŭgugi (the rain gauge) and the water gauge, highlight the technological advancements of the Joseon dynasty.

== Early years ==
Chang Yŏngsil's precise date of birth is unknown and only recorded in the genealogy of the Chang family and his ancestry in the Veritable Records of the Joseon Dynasty. According to these records, his father, Chang Seong-hwi, was the eighth generation of the Chang family. Chang Seong-hwi was the third of five brothers, all of whom previously served as ministers in Goryeo. Historical records also mention his elder brother, Chang Seong-bal, who was born in 1344 and whose grave is located at Ui-seong in North Gyeongsang Province. Yŏngsil's mother was a government-registered courtesan, making Chang a government-owned nobi – a type of Joseon's lowest class.

== Civil service ==
Chang's fame gained him entry into the royal court in Hanseong (present-day Seoul), where select commoners displayed their talents before the king and his advisers. Sejong was impressed by Chang's craft and engineering skills and allowed Chang to work as a court technician in the palace. The talented scientists recruited under Sejong's new program worked at the Hall of Worthies.

=== Astronomical instruments ===
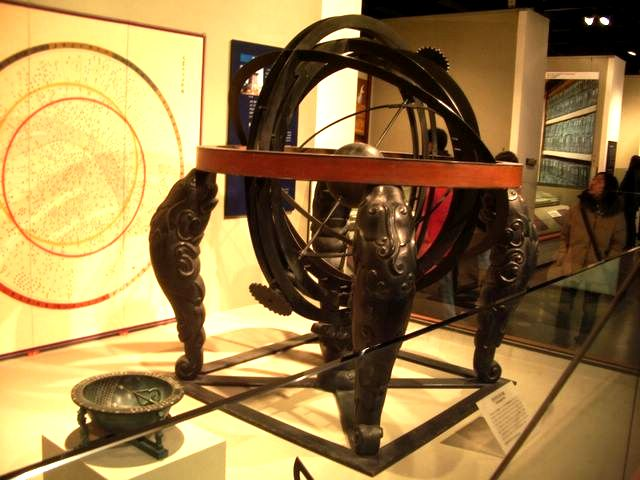
Korean celestial globe first made by the scientist Chang Yŏngsil during the Joseon dynasty under the reign of King Sejong the Great of Joseon

Chang was tasked to build a celestial globe to measure astronomical objects. Books obtained from Arabian and Chinese scholars contained incomplete instructions, for these devices could also be used for military purposes. After two months of study, Chang made a spherical device that performed with mediocre accuracy. In 1433, a year after his first attempt, Chang made an armillary sphere known as the honcheonui (혼천의; 渾天儀). Honcheonui depended on a waterwheel to rotate the internal globe to indicate time. Whether day or night, this allowed the instrument to be updated on the positions of the sun, moon, and the stars. Later celestial globes (gyupyo (규표)) could measure time changes according to the seasonal variations. These instruments, along with the sundials and water clocks, were stationed around the Gyeonghoeru Pavilion in Gyeongbok Palace and put into use by the astronomers. The success of Chang's astronomical machines was marked in 1442 AD when the Korean astronomers compiled their computations on the courses of the seven heavenly objects (five visible planets, the sun, and moon) in Chiljeongsan (칠정산), an astronomical calendar that made it possible for scientists to calculate and accurately predict all the major heavenly phenomena, such as solar eclipses and other stellar movements.

=== Iron printing press ===
Although Ch'oe Yun-ŭi invented the world's first metal printing press in 1234 during the Goryeo period, Sejong asked scientists at Jiphyeonjeon to build a better printing press. In 1434, scientists accomplished building Gabinja (갑인자; 甲寅字), which was made of copper-zinc and lead-tin alloys. It was said to be twice as fast as the previous printing presses and printed Chinese characters in astounding beauty and clarity. Gabinja was reproduced six times during the next 370 years.

=== Water clock ===
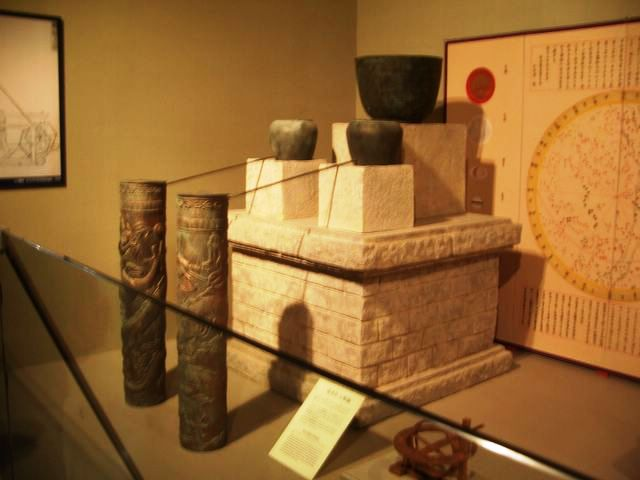
Scale model of the ‘water’ half of Chang Yŏngsil's self-striking water clock.

Samguk Sagi records that an office overseeing the use of water clocks had been established during the Three Kingdoms period. The Korean water clock consisted of two stacked jars of water, with water dropping from the top to the bottom at a measured rate. The level of the water indicated the time of the day. This was very inconvenient because a person had to be always be on guard, so that a drum could be banged at each hour to inform the public of the current time.

Self-striking water clocks were not new, having already been invented by the Arabians and the Chinese (in 1091). Upon hearing about the usage of self-striking water clocks in foreign countries, Sejong assigned Chang and other scientists to build a clock emulating such automatic devices. After their initial attempts failed in developing an operational water clock, Chang traveled to China to study the various designs of water clocks. When he returned in 1434, Chang created Korea's first self-striking water clock, the Jagyeokru (자격루), which would mark the hour automatically with the sounds of a bell, gong, and drum, and was used to keep the standard of time in Joseon. This water clock was not preserved well and did not survive; however, reconstructions of the Jagyeokru based on text descriptions have been made.

Circling the clock were 12 wooden figures that served as indicators of time. There were 4 water containers, 2 jars that received the water, and 12 arrows floating inside the lower container. As the water from the upper containers seeped down the pipe to the lower container, one of the arrows would tilt a board filled with small iron balls; a ball would roll down a pipe to a container of larger iron balls. The collision would cause the larger balls to travel down a lower pipe and hit a giant cymbal, announcing the time to the community. A ball would then land on another container, which was part of a complex system of levers and pulleys that moved wooden figures to indicate the time visually.

=== Sundial ===
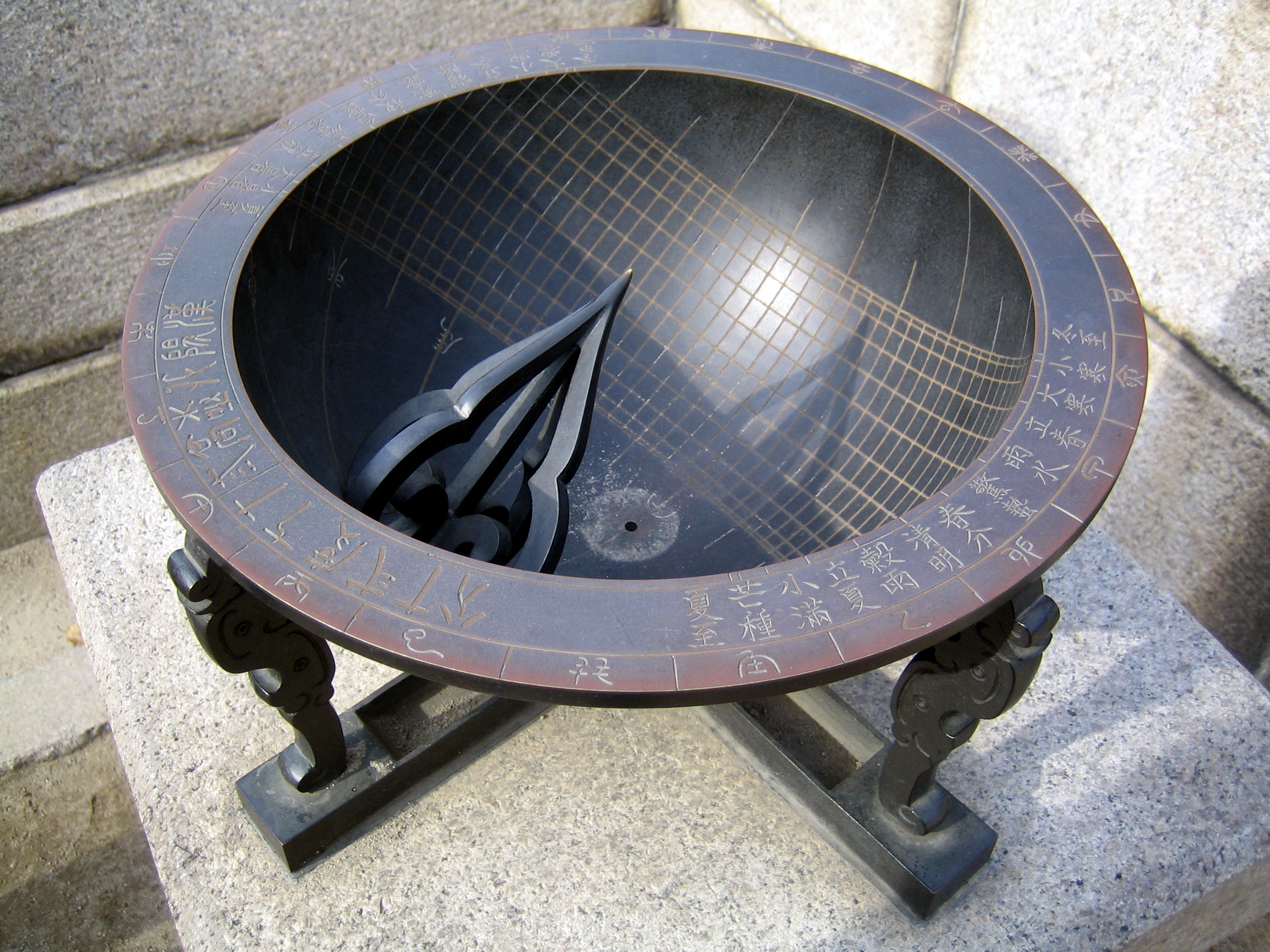
A Korean sundial first made by Chang Yŏngsil during the Joseon period, displayed in Gyeongbokgung.

Chang's invention of the water clock saw the start of its use throughout the country, however, these water clocks were very costly. Development of the sundial provided a cheaper and more manageable alternative. Chang, Ichun, Kimjo, and other scientists made Korea's first sundial, the Angbu-ilgu (앙부일구/仰釜日晷), which meant "pot-shaped sun clock staring at the sky". Angbu-ilgu was bronze in composition, and consisted of a bowl marked with 13 meters to indicate time and 4 legs jointed by a cross at the base. Seven lines crossed the 13 meters in different curves to compensate for the seasonal changes of the course of the sun. Angbu-ilgu and other variants, such as the Hyeonju Ilgu (현주일구/懸珠日晷) and the Cheonpyeong Ilgu (천평일구/天平日晷), were implemented in strategic spots, such as the town's main streets with heavy traffic, so that the people could be well informed of the time. To compensate for the high illiteracy rate among the commoners, 12 shapes of the Chinese zodiac were engraved in juxtaposition with the meters. No sundials from the Joseon dynasty made during King Sejong's reign still exist today; none are known to have survived past the Japanese invasions of Korea (1592–1598) (임진왜란).

=== Research on weaponry ===
When Sejong learned of reports that Korean melee weapons were duller and somewhat heavier than those of the neighboring countries, he sent Chang to Gyeongsang Province, where Chang had spent his earlier life developing metal alloys for various weapons and tools. Since Chang used to be a gwanno (관노/官奴) (a man-slave in government employ), he had already acquired much knowledge about metal working, and also knew the geography of the area. Chang surveyed the available metals and their characteristics, and presented his research to Sejong and the generals, contributing to the development of Korean weaponry.

=== Rain gauge ===
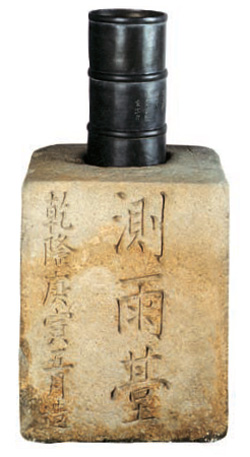
Cheugugi

The Korean economy during the Joseon dynasty was agriculturally based and vulnerable to prolonged or consecutively occurring droughts; therefore, there was a need for better ways to manage water. Although rain gauges had been used in ancient Greece and India, Chang is often claimed to have invented Korea's first rain gauge in 1441, called cheugugi (측우기/測雨器), and, by 1442, a standardized rain gauge with dimensions of 42.5 cm (height) and 17 cm (diameter) was introduced throughout the country to gather data on the yearly averages of precipitation throughout the different regions of the country. However, there are no written records that link Chang to the cheugigi, with Crown Prince Yi Hyang (later King Munjong) instead recorded as the first to propose the idea.

=== Water gauge ===
To allow better water management, Sejong asked the scientists to figure out some ways to inform the farmers of the available amount of water; and, in 1441, Chang invented the world's first water gauge, called Supyo (수표/水標). It was a calibrated stone column placed in the middle of a body of water, connected by a stone bridge.

== Expulsion ==
Chang's extraordinary accomplishments earned him the trust of Sejong. Some government officials were very jealous of Chang, especially when he had achieved so much despite his common origin.

In 1442, Sejong ordered Chang to build a gama, an elaborately decorated Korean sedan chair. The gama broke while Sejong was traveling, and Chang was held responsible. Although Sejong was against the decree, Chang was jailed for an extended period of time, flogged 80 times and expelled from the royal palace. Later events of Chang's life, including the date of his death, were not recorded, although there is speculation that he either died from the flogging or defected to China. It is unlikely, but possible that Chang Yŏngsil may have died during the reign of Joseon's 7th king, Sejo of Joseon (r. 1455–1468).

== Popular culture ==
- Portrayed by Lee Chun-hee in the 2008 KBS2 TV series The Great King, Sejong.
- Portrayed by Im Hyung-joon in the 2012 film I Am the King.
- Portrayed by Kim Seul-gi in the 2015 MBC TV series Splash Splash Love.
- Portrayed by Song Il-gook in the 2016 KBS1 TV series Jang Yeong-sil.
- Portrayed by Choi Min-sik in the 2019 film Forbidden Dream.

== Tribute ==
On May 19, 2018, Google celebrated Chang Yŏngsil with a Google Doodle.

== See also ==
- Hwacha
- Science and technology in Korea
- Sundial
- Water clock
- Woo Jang-choon
