= Deposed Crown Princess Bong =

Crown Princess of Joseon (fl. 15th century)

Crown Princess of Joseon
- Tenure: 20 November 1429 – 13 December 1436
- Predecessor: Crown Princess Kim
- Successor: Crown Princess Gwon
- Born: after 1410; Joseon
- Died: after 1436; Joseon
- Spouse: King Munjong (m. 1429–1436)
- Clan: Haeum Bong (by birth); Jeonju Yi (by marriage)
- Dynasty: Yi
- Father: Bong Ryeo

Korean name
- Hangul: 폐빈 봉씨
- Hanja: 廢嬪 奉氏
- RR: Pyebin Bongssi
- MR: P'yebin Pongssi

Deposed Crown Princess Bong (Korean: 폐빈 봉씨; Hanja: 廢嬪 奉氏; birth and death dates unknown), of the Haeum Bong clan, also known as Crown Princess Sun, was the second wife of Crown Prince Hyang (King Munjong), later the fifth monarch of Joseon. She was demoted to commoner status and banished from the palace following the discovery of her homosexual affair with one of her maids.

== Biography ==
=== Early life and lineage ===
Lady Bong was most likely born during the reign of King Taejong, but the exact date and year of birth are unknown. Her father was Bong Ryeo (봉려), a great-nephew of Empress Gi, who served as vice minister of personnel (이조 참판). While her mother is unidentified, it is recorded that Lady Bong had at least two younger brothers and one sister.

Her first cousin, Bong Yeo-hae (봉여해), married the youngest sister of Park Paeng-nyeon and was later executed for participating in the six martyred ministers' plot to restore King Danjong.

=== Life in the palace ===
Lady Bong was invested as crown princess in 1429, a few months after Crown Princess Kim was deposed for practicing witchcraft.

The Veritable Records of the Joseon Dynasty mention that she was chosen as crown princess because both King Sejong and the officials in charge of the selection were satisfied with her appearance, irrespective of lineage and wifely virtue. Therefore, she is one of the few Joseon royal consorts to be officially recorded as a beautiful woman.

However, like her predecessor, Lady Bong also failed to have a harmonious marital relationship. Her husband once told his father, "If I favor her, she will become jealous and fierce, and will not hesitate to wield even a blade; if things go her way, even Empress Lü of old could not surpass her." So regardless of whether he was physically attracted to Lady Bong, the crown prince viewed her character as lacking.

Getting drunk was a common occurrence for her; while inebriated, she would sometimes have her maids carry her on their backs around the courtyard. She often publicly bemoaned the crown prince's lack of enthusiasm toward her, and out of jealousy, she would personally beat palace ladies for minor offenses, driving some of them to the brink of death.

In 1431, as the crown prince continued to remain childless, three new consorts were brought into the palace, which caused Lady Bong to harbor resentment. When Seunghwi Gwon announced her pregnancy in 1433, Lady Bong was indignant; she believed she would be removed from her position if the child was male and her laments would occasionally spread throughout the palace, prompting King Sejong to admonish her. Nevertheless, King Sejong also advised the crown prince to spend more time with his wife because having a legitimate son was preferable. Lady Bong thus briefly enjoyed a closer relationship with her husband and reportedly became pregnant, but before long, she claimed to have suffered a miscarriage. While it was eventually revealed that she had never been pregnant, it is unclear whether she suffered from a phantom pregnancy or simply lied to garner attention.

=== Downfall ===
In late 1435, Lady Bong began sleeping with a maid named So-ssang (소쌍). The prevailing view today is that it was a coercive relationship as So-ssang later testified dreading Lady Bong's summons and declining her advances, only to be intimidated into sexual contact. Moreover, So-ssang already had a romantic attachment to another maid named Dan-ji (단지) and Lady Bong's constant surveillance kept them apart.

Rumors ultimately reached King Sejong and after investigation, Lady Bong was demoted to commoner status. However, the edict for her deposition excluded any mention of the homosexual affair and instead focused on matters such as Lady Bong's sending palace supplies to her natal home, as well as her inability to bear children, jealousy and vulgar behavior.

=== Later life and death ===
There are no surviving records about Lady Bong's life after her banishment from the palace; as such, it remains unknown when she died and where her tomb is located.

== Titles ==
- During the reign of King Taejong (r. 1400–1418):
  - Lady, of the Haeum Bong clan (하음 봉씨; 河陰奉氏; from unknown date)
    - Bong Ryeo's daughter (봉려의 딸)
    - Lady Bong (봉씨; 奉氏)
- During the reign of King Sejong (r. 1418–1450):
  - Crown Princess Sun (순빈; 純嬪; from 20 November 1429)
  - Crown Princess (왕세자빈; 王世子嬪; from 19 June 1432) (Note: In 1432, the system of conferring honorific titles upon the queen and crown princess was abolished.)
  - Commoner (서인; 庶人; from 13 December 1436)

== Family ==
- Father: Bong Ryeo (봉려; 1375–1436)
- Mother: Lady, of a certain clan (모씨)
- Sibling(s)
  - Bong Geuk-hwa (봉극화; 1420–?)
  - Bong Guk-yu (봉극유)
  - Lady, of the Haeum Bong clan (하음 봉씨)
- Husband: King Munjong (문종대왕; 15 November 1414 – 10 June 1452) — No issue.
  - Father-in-law: King Sejong (세종대왕; 15 May 1397 – 8 April 1450)
  - Mother-in-law: Queen Soheon (소헌왕후), of the Cheongsong Shim clan (청송 심씨; 20 October 1395 – 28 April 1446)

== Ancestry ==
Ancestors of Deposed Crown Princess Bong

Bong Yu-rye (봉유례)
Gi Won (기원)
Lady, of the Haengju Gi clan (행주 기씨)
Bong Ryeo (봉려)
Song Deok-jae (송덕재)
Lady, of the Song clan (송씨)
Seol Bong (설봉)
Lady, of the Sunchang Seol clan (순창 설씨)
Lady, of the Munhwa Yu clan (문화 유씨)
Deposed Crown Princess Bong
Lady, of a certain clan (모씨)

== In popular culture ==
- Portrayed by Yeo Min-joo in the 2008 KBS2 TV series The Great King, Sejong.
- Portrayed by Jung Da-eun in the 2021 KBS Drama Special episode "The Palace".

== See also ==
- History of Korea
- Styles and titles in Joseon
