= Deposed Crown Princess Kim =

Crown Princess of Joseon (fl. 15th century)

Crown Princess of Joseon
- Tenure: 14 May 1427 – 27 August 1429
- Predecessor: Crown Princess Shim
- Successor: Crown Princess Bong
- Born: after 1410; Joseon
- Died: after 1429; Joseon
- Spouse: King Munjong (m. 1427–1429)
- Clan: Andong Kim (by birth); Jeonju Yi (by marriage)
- Dynasty: Yi
- Father: Kim O-mun
- Mother: Lady, of the Hadong Jeong clan

Korean name
- Hangul: 폐빈 김씨
- Hanja: 廢嬪 金氏
- RR: Pyebin Gimssi
- MR: P'yebin Kimssi

Deposed Crown Princess Kim (Korean: 폐빈 김씨; Hanja: 廢嬪 金氏; birth and death dates unknown), of the (old) Andong Kim clan, also known as Crown Princess Hwi, was the first wife of Crown Prince Hyang (King Munjong), later the fifth monarch of Joseon. She was demoted to commoner status and banished from the palace after using witchcraft to gain her husband's affection.

== Biography ==
=== Early life and lineage ===
Lady Kim was most likely born during the reign of King Taejong, but the exact date and year of birth are unknown. Her father was Kim O-mun (김오문), a high-ranking official in charge of military affairs, and her mother was a lady from the Hadong Jeong clan (하동 정씨).

She had at least one brother, Kim Jung-eom (김중엄), who became the great-grandfather of Queen Dangyeong. Her paternal aunt was Concubine Myeong (명빈 김씨; consort of King Taejong), and via her great-great-great-grandfather, Min Jeok (민적), she was a second cousin twice removed of Queen Wongyeong.

=== Life in the palace ===
Lady Kim was invested as crown princess in 1427, but her husband showed little interest in her.

Court records indicate that in the winter of 1428, Lady Kim asked her maid, Ho-cho (호초), how she could gain a man's love. Ho-cho told her to burn her rivals' shoes to ash, grind them into powder and have the man drink it. She recommended that Lady Kim test the method using two palace ladies of whom she was already jealous, Hyo-dong (효동) and Deok-geum (덕금), which she promptly did. When it didn't work out, Lady Kim requested further methods. Ho-cho instructed her to drain the fluids from a snake and rub those essences onto a cloth, claiming that if Lady Kim wore that cloth in the crown prince's presence, he would love her. Meanwhile, another maid named Sun-deok (순덕), whom Lady Kim had brought into the palace from her natal home, found remains of the burnt shoes in her perfume pouch and reported the matter to Lady Kim's mother.

When King Sejong and Queen Soheon belatedly discovered Lady Kim's actions and interrogated her, she readily confessed. After Sun-deok presented the shoe remains and all testimonies were clear, Ho-cho was executed by beheading and Lady Kim was demoted to commoner status, while her father's official titles were revoked and her brother was removed from his position.

=== Later life and death ===
There are no surviving records about Lady Kim's life after her banishment from the palace; as such, it remains unknown when she died and where her tomb is located.

== Titles ==
- During the reign of King Taejong (r. 1400–1418):
  - Lady, of the Andong Kim clan (안동 김씨; 安東金氏; from unknown date)
    - Kim O-mun's daughter (김오문의 딸)
    - Lady Kim (김씨; 金氏)
- During the reign of King Sejong (r. 1418–1450):
  - Crown Princess Hwi (휘빈; 徽嬪; from 14 May 1427)
  - Commoner (서인; 庶人; from 27 August 1429)

== Family ==
- Father: Kim O-mun (김오문)
- Mother: Lady, of the Hadong Jeong clan (하동 정씨)
- Sibling(s)
  - Kim Jung-eom (김중엄) (Note: ▪︎Wife: Lady, the Pyongyang Jo clan (평양 조씨); second daughter of Princess Gyeongjeong (경정공주; 1387–1455) and granddaughter of King Taejong. ▪︎Issue: 2 sons, 1 daughter; among his descendants is Queen Dangyeong (great-granddaughter).)
- Husband: King Munjong (문종대왕; 15 November 1414 – 10 June 1452) — No issue.
  - Father-in-law: King Sejong (세종대왕; 15 May 1397 – 8 April 1450)
  - Mother-in-law: Queen Soheon (소헌왕후), of the Cheongsong Shim clan (청송 심씨; 20 October 1395 – 28 April 1446)

== Ancestry ==
Ancestors of Deposed Crown Princess Kim

Kim Seung-taek (김승택)
Kim Myo (김묘)
Kim Gu-deok (김구덕)
Min Sa-pyeong (민사평)
Lady, of the Yeoheung Min clan (여흥 민씨)
Lady, of the Eonyang Kim clan (언양 김씨)
Kim O-mun (김오문)
Shin Gyeong-chang (신경창)
Lady, of the Yeongwol Shin clan (영월 신씨)
Deposed Crown Princess Kim
Lady, of the Hadong Jeong clan (하동 정씨)

== See also ==
- Styles and titles in Joseon
- Korean clans
- Society of Joseon
