= Jang Yeong-sil (TV series) =

2016 South Korean historical television series

- Promotional poster
- Also known as: Jang Youngsil: The Greatest Scientist of Joseon
- Genre: Historical period drama; Science fiction
- Written by: Lee Myung-hee; Ma Chang-jun
- Directed by: Kim Young-jo
- Starring: Song Il-kook; Kim Yeong-cheol; Kim Sang-kyung; Park Sun-young
- Composer: Lee Chang-hee
- Country of origin: South Korea
- Original language: Korean
- No. of episodes: 24

Production
- Executive producer: Kim Hyung-il
- Producer: Kim Sang-hwi
- Production locations: Mungyeong Saejae; Buan County
- Running time: 50 minutes
- Production company: KBS Media

Original release
- Network: KBS1
- Release: January 2 – March 26, 2016

Jang Yeong-sil (Korean: 장영실) is a 2016 South Korean historical drama television series starring Song Il-kook, Kim Yeong-cheol, Kim Sang-kyung and Park Sun-young. It replaced The Jingbirok: A Memoir of Imjin War and aired on KBS1 from January 2, 2016 to March 26, 2016 on Saturdays and Sundays at 21:40 (KST) for 24 episodes.

== Plot ==
A television series talk about Jang Yeong-sil, a popular scientist of Joseon in the 15th century. Born as a slave but with the remarkable talent and the profound passion for astronomy, he was known by King Sejong and was recommended to the court. Jang Yeong-sil had a lot of contributions for the science-technology of Joseon, he has left many great inventions such as the water clock, the sundial, the astronomical instruments, the rain gauge and also many research on weaponry.

== Cast ==
=== Main characters ===
- Song Il-kook as Jang Yeong-sil (or Jang Young-sil)
  - Jung Yoon-seok as young Jang Yeong-sil
- Kim Sang-kyung as Yi Do, later King Sejong the Great (1397–1450)
  - Hong Hyun-taek as young Yi Do
- Kim Yeong-cheol as Yi Bang-won, later King Taejong (1367–1422)
- Park Sun-young as Princess Sohyun – King Taejong's daughter and Yi Do's older sister (fictional character)
  - Yoon Si-yeong as young Sohyun

=== Supporting characters ===
==== Royal household ====
- Kim Ki-hyeon as King Taejo
- Lee Byung-wook as Prince Yangnyeong
- Kim Bo-mi as Princess Gyeonghye
- Han Jeong-woo as King Munjong
  - Choi Seung-hoon as young Yi Hyang (later King Munjong)
- Choi Dong-ah as King Danjong
- Go Young-bin as King Sejo

==== Court officials ====
- Kim Do-hyun as Lee Cheon
- Son Byong-ho as Ha Yeon
- Jung Han-yong as Hwang Hui
- Kim Byung-ki as Maeng Sa-sung
- Lee Young-seok as Jo Mal-saeng
- Han Ki-joong as Heo Jo
- Kim Hyo-won as Jeong Cho
- Kang Shin-goo as Jeong Heum-ji
- Jeong Eui-gap as Jeong In-ji
- Park Seung-gyu as Park Eun
- Hwang Yi-geon as Kim Goo-nam
- Lee Geon-myung as Park Yeon
- Ahn Shin-woo as Choe Manri

==== Seoungwan people ====
- Lee Byung-hoon as Lee Sun-ji
- Seo Hyun-chul as Choi Bok (fictional character)
- Im Hyuk as Yoo Taek-sang
- Min Joon-hyun as Jeon Bae-cheon (fictional character)
- Lee Joo-hyun as Ji Gyeong-chan (fictional character)
- Kang Ji-hoo as Sung Sa-gook (fictional character)

==== Dongnaehyeon people ====
- Lee Ji-hoon as Jang Hee-je (fictional character)
  - Kim Dan-yool as young Jang Hee-je
- Kim Myeong-soo as Jang Sung-hwi – a Goryeo's scientist, minister and Jang Yeong-sil's father
- Kim Ae-ran as Eun-wol – a Kisaeng and Jang Yeong-sil's mother (assumed character)
- Son Ho-gyun as Jang Gi-bae (fictional character)
- Kang Sung-jin as Seok-goo – Jang Yeong-sil's best friend (fictional character)
  - Lee Joon-seo as young Seok-goo
- Kim Dae-jong as Kim Hak-joo – a noble and Jang Hee-je's friend (fictional character)
  - Lee Kye-in as young Kim Hak-joo

==== Hanyang people ====
- Yoon Ah-reum as Eul-seon (Chinese: 乙善; Pinyin: Yǐ Shàn) – princess Sohyun's maid, later Seok-goo's wife
- N/A as Oh Goo-san
- Lee Geon as Han Nae-gwan
- Kim Mi-ra as Uhm Sang-goong

==== Ming dynasty ====
- Im Dong-jin as Joo Tae-kang (Chinese: 朱太江; Pinyin: Zhū Tàijiāng) – a Ming dynasty old prince (fictional character)
- Park Gyu-ri as Joo Bu-ryeong (Chinese: 朱副伶; Pinyin: Zhū Fùlíng) – Tae-kang's daughter (fictional character)
- Im Chul-hyung as Yoon Bong – a Joseon person working as a eunuch in Ming dynasty
- Kwon Bin as Zhengtong Emperor

==== Extended cast ====
- Kwak Min-ho as Go Gil-soo – a trader between Joseon and Ming dynasty (fictional character)
- Jo Sang-goo as Byun Dae-chi
- Byun Joon-seok as Choi Yool
- Jang Gwang as Jo Gwang
- Hwang Chan-ho as Moo-san
- Kim Min-hyuk as Oh Pil-gyo
- N/A as Bae Kang-choon
- Cha Ye-joon as Im Myung-deok
- Kim Ae-ran as Eun-wol
- Oh Ji-hyuk as Yoo Cheol
- Cha Bo-sung as Sung Sam-moon
- Jang Joon-nyung
- Jin Hyun-kwang
- Lee Je-kwan
- Park Dae-kyu
- Jeon Jin-ki
- Seol Chang-hee
- Choi Dong-yeob
- Kim Moon-sik
- Shin Chi-young
- Jo Shin-geun
- Jo Yeon-ho
- Hwang Bi-ho
- Lee Ho-yool
- Lee Joo-yeon

=== Cameo appearances ===
- Nam Il-woo as Jang Sung-bae – Jang Sung-hwi's oldest brother
- Chae Dong-hyun as Kim Beob-rae
- Yeo Hoe-hyun as Na Ki-soon
- Song Triplets as three little beggars

== Ratings ==
In the table below, the blue numbers represent the lowest ratings and the red numbers represent the highest ratings.

Episode #	Original broadcast date	Average audience share			
Episode #	Original broadcast date	TNmS Ratings		AGB Nielsen Ratings	
Episode #	Original broadcast date	Nationwide	Seoul National Capital Area	Nationwide	Seoul National Capital Area
1	January 2, 2016	8.5%	8.7%	11.6%	11.5%
2	January 3, 2016	8.6%	8.4%	11.5%	12.3%
3	January 9, 2016	9.6%	8.6%	10.2%	10.4%
4	January 10, 2016	9.0%	9.2%	11.3%	12.3%
5	January 16, 2016	9.8%	9.3%	10.1%	10.1%
6	January 17, 2016	10.0%	9.9%	12.2%	12.9%
7	January 23, 2016	12.2%	11.3%	14.1%	14.2%
8	January 24, 2016	12.4%	10.8%	14.1%	15.1%
9	January 30, 2016	10.7%	9.3%	12.2%	12.5%
10	January 31, 2016	10.4%	10.0%	13.4%	13.5%
11	February 6, 2016	9.9%	9.5%	11.9%	12.5%
12	February 13, 2016	9.2%	8.2%	10.9%	11.8%
13	February 14, 2016	9.1%	8.5%	10.3%	10.3%
14	February 20, 2016	9.0%	9.5%	11.0%	11.1%
15	February 21, 2016	9.2%	8.4%	11.7%	11.6%
16	February 27, 2016	8.8%	8.3%	10.8%	10.8%
17	February 28, 2016	9.6%	9.3%	11.7%	11.6%
18	March 5, 2016	10.5%	10.1%	11.5%	12.1%
19	March 6, 2016	9.7%	8.2%	11.8%	11.6%
20	March 12, 2016	9.4%	8.4%	10.4%	10.1%
21	March 13, 2016	10.1%	8.2%	12.0%	12.2%
22	March 19, 2016	9.5%	8.2%	10.4%	10.0%
23	March 20, 2016	10.5%	9.8%	11.9%	11.9%
24	March 26, 2016	9.4%	8.0%	10.2%	10.2%
Average ratings		9.7958%	9.0875%	11.55%	11.775%

Remark

- Episode 12, scheduled to be broadcast on the evening of February 7, was canceled because South Korea was in emergency after the North Korea's missile launch (Kwangmyŏngsŏng-4) at 9:30 am in the same day.

== Original soundtrack ==
KBS Drama Jang Yeong-sil OST

Soundtrack album by Various Artists
- Released: April 1, 2016
- Genres: Pop, K-pop, Soundtrack
- Length: 1:37:32
- Label: KBS Media
- Producer: Lee Chang-hee

No.	Title	Writer(s)	Length
1.	"Black And White (Drama Mix Ver.) (Main Title)"	Lee Chang-hee, Kim Joon-beom	1:27
2.	"Celestial"	Lee Chang-hee, Choi Jae-woo	2:24
3.	"Eclipse Festival"	Choi Jae-woo	1:38
4.	"Here We Are"	Lee Chang-hee, Kim Joon-beom	4:03
5.	"Great Invention"	Lee Chang-hee, Choi Myung-hee	2:58
6.	"Bear Resentment"	Lee Chang-hee, Choi Myung-hee	3:03
7.	"I Am A"	Lee Chang-hee, Kim Joon-beom	3:01
8.	"Inspiration"	Lee Chang-hee, Yeo Ha-kyung	2:37
9.	"My Kingdom My People"	Yeo Ha-kyung	3:39
10.	"Dia Black"	Lee Chang-hee, Kim Joon-beom	2:27
11.	"Eureka"	Choi Jae-woo, Yeo Ha-kyung	1:39
12.	"Form A Distance"	Kim Joon-beom, Choi Jae-woo	2:24
13.	"Peacepul"	Choi Myung-hee	2:55
14.	"Twinkle"	Yeo Ha-kyung	2:39
15.	"Hostility"	Yeo Ha-kyung	2:26
16.	"Dreamscape"	Kim Seo-hyun	1:11
17.	"Here We Are (Slow Ver.)"	Lee Chang-hee, Kim Joon-beom	2:20
18.	"Cloud Blac"	Kim Joon-beom, Choi Jae-woo	4:59
19.	"Look At The Sky"	Choi Myung-hee	1:50
20.	"Providence"	Choi Myung-hee, Choi Jae-woo	3:47
21.	"Second Way"	Kim Joon-beom, Kim Seo-hyun	4:16
22.	"Tic Toc"	Yeo Ha-kyung, Kim Seo-hyun	2:25
23.	"Whiter Happening"	Lee Chang-hee, Kim Joon-beom	1:16
24.	"Curiosity"	Choi Myung-hee	2:42
25.	"Run To Death"	Yeo Ha-kyung	2:23
26.	"Conflicting"	Kim Joon-beom, Choi Myung-hee	4:33
27.	"Rage"	Kim Seo-hyun	2:27
28.	"Inventor Jang"	Choi Myung-hee, Kim Seo-hyun	1:33
29.	"Silver"	Kim Joon-beom	2:07
30.	"Jangs Lab"	Kim Joon-beom, Choi Myung-hee	6:17
31.	"Chopin : Prelude No.4 In E Minor Op.28-4"	Various Artists	3:45
32.	"Ivory White"	Lee Chang-hee, Kim Joon-beom	6:51
33.	"Black And White (Classic Mix Ver.) (Main Title)"	Lee Chang-hee, Kim Joon-beom	1:29
34.	"Quf Ak Wnd"	Kim Eun-myung	2:01
Total length:			1:37:32

== Awards and nominations ==
Year	Award	Category	Recipient	Result
2016	KBS Drama Awards	Top Excellence Award, Actor	Song Il-gook	Nominated
2016	KBS Drama Awards	Excellence Award, Actor in a Mid-length Drama	Song Il-gook	Won
2016	KBS Drama Awards	Best Young Actor	Jung Yoon-seok	Won
