= Queen Hyeondeok =

Queen of Joseon (1417–1441)

- Queen Consort of Joseon (posthumously)

Crown Princess of Joseon
- Tenure: 12 February 1437 – 19 August 1441
- Predecessor: Crown Princess Bong
- Successor: Crown Princess Han
- Born: 26 April 1417; Hongju-mok, Chungcheong Province, Joseon
- Died: 19 August 1441 (aged 24); Jaseondang, Gyeongbokgung, Hanseong, Joseon
- Burial: Hyeolleung, Donggureung Cluster, Guri, South Korea
- Spouse: King Munjong (m. 1437) (Note: Lady Gwon had become Munjong's consort six years prior to her elevation to the position of crown princess and legitimate wife.)
- Issue Detail: 1 son, 2 daughters
Names
- Gwon Sun-im (권순임; 權順任)
Posthumous name
- Crown Princess Hyeondeok (현덕빈; 顯德嬪) → Queen Inhyo Sunhye Hyeondeok (인효순혜현덕왕후; 仁孝順惠顯德王后)
- Clan: Andong Gwon (by birth); Jeonju Yi (by marriage)
- Dynasty: Yi
- Father: Gwon Jeon, Internal Prince Hwasan
- Mother: Internal Princess Consort Haeryeong, of the Haeju Choe clan

Korean name
- Hangul: 현덕왕후
- Hanja: 顯德王后
- RR: Hyeondeok wanghu
- MR: Hyŏndŏk wanghu

Queen Hyeondeok (Korean: 현덕왕후; Hanja: 顯德王后; 26 April 1417 – 19 August 1441), of the Andong Gwon clan, personal name Gwon Sun-im, was the third wife of Crown Prince Hyang (King Munjong), later the fifth monarch of Joseon, and the mother of the ill-fated King Danjong. She died due to complications following childbirth, and was posthumously elevated to the position of queen upon her husband's accession to the throne.

== Biography ==
=== Early life and lineage ===
The future Queen Hyeondeok was born during the reign of King Taejong, as the third daughter and child among one son and seven daughters. Her father was Gwon Jeon (권전) and her mother was his second wife, a lady from the Haeju Choe clan (해주 최씨). Her two elder sisters were born to her father's first wife, while two of her younger sisters were of concubine birth.

=== Life in the palace ===
In 1431, around the age of 14, Lady Gwon entered the palace alongside two other girls, Lady Jeong (later known as Soyong Jeong) and Lady Hong. All were appointed as consorts of the crown prince of the junior fourth rank (승휘; seunghwi).

In 1432 or 1433, she became pregnant, which attracted the jealousy of the childless Crown Princess Bong, who feared she would be removed in favor of Lady Gwon if she gave birth to a son. Nevertheless, Lady Gwon's first child turned out to be a daughter who died in infancy. In 1435, she gave birth to Princess Gyeonghye, and was then promoted to the junior third rank (양원; yangwon).

Soon after, Crown Princess Bong was deposed following a number of scandals, including a homosexual affair with her maid and a fake pregnancy. King Sejong initially considered selecting a new crown princess, but believed there was no guarantee she would be virtuous. While elevating a consort to the position of crown princess was akin to making a concubine a wife and was without precedent in Joseon, he decided it was better to choose from among the crown prince's consorts, as they had lived in the palace for years and their conduct had been verified. The final candidates were Lady Gwon and Lady Hong, who seemed to be the one favored by the crown prince. Nevertheless, Lady Gwon was older, held a higher rank, and above all, had given birth to the crown prince's only surviving child. In early 1437, she was invested as crown princess in a simplified ceremony.

=== Death and aftermath ===
On 18 August 1441, Lady Gwon gave birth to the much awaited heir, Yi Hong-wi, but died a day later, at the age of 24. She was granted the posthumous name Hyeondeok (현덕; lit. ''clear morality''), and was buried within Soreung (소릉) in Ansan, Gyeonggi Province.

When King Munjong acceded to the throne in 1450, Lady Gwon was posthumously elevated to the position of queen. King Danjong later added Inhyo Sunhye (인효순혜; lit. ''filial and compassionate, obedient and benevolent'') to the posthumous name of his mother.

In 1456, shortly after her brother-in-law, King Sejo, had deposed her son, Lady Gwon's mother and brother were discovered to be instigating a movement to restore King Danjong to the throne and were executed on charges of treason. Consequently, Lady Gwon and her father were posthumously demoted to the commoner class.

Lady Gwon's status was restored in 1513, during the reign of King Jungjong, and she was reburied alongside King Munjong within Hyeolleung (현릉), today part of the Donggureung Cluster in Guri, Gyeonggi Province.

== Titles ==
- During the reign of King Taejong (r. 1400–1418):
  - Lady, of the Andong Gwon clan (안동 권씨; 安東權氏; from 26 April 1417)
    - Gwon Jeon's daughter (권전의 딸)
    - Lady Gwon (권씨; 權氏)
- During the reign of King Sejong (r. 1418–1450):
  - Seunghwi (Note: lit. ''Lady of Inherent Glory'') (승휘; 承徽; from 5 May 1431), consort of the crown prince of the junior fourth rank
  - Yangwon (Note: lit. ''Lady of Filial Excellence'') (양원; 良媛; from 1436), consort of the crown prince of the junior third rank
  - Crown Princess (왕세자빈; 王世子嬪; from 12 February 1437)
  - Crown Princess Hyeondeok (현덕빈; 顯德嬪; from 1441)
- During the reign of King Munjong (r. 1450–1452):
  - Queen Hyeondeok (현덕왕후; 顯德王后; from June 1450)
- During the reign of King Sejo (r. 1455–1468):
  - Commoner (서인; 庶人; from 17 July 1457)
- During the reign of King Jungjong (r. 1506–1544):
  - Queen Hyeondeok (현덕왕후; 顯德王后; from 1513)

== Family ==
- Father: Gwon Jeon (권전), Internal Prince Hwasan (화산부원군; 1371–1441)
- Stepmother: Lady, of the Andong Gwon clan (안동 권씨) (Note: Gwon Jeon's first wife.)
- Mother: Internal Princess Consort Haeryeong (해령부부인), of the Haeju Choe clan (해주 최씨; ?–1456); given name A-ji (아지)
- Sibling(s)
  - Lady, of the Andong Gwon clan (안동 권씨) (Note: Half-sister.) (Note: Married Gwon San-hae (권산해) from the Andong Gwon clan (안동 권씨).)
  - Lady, of the Andong Gwon clan (안동 권씨} (Note: Married Kim Yeong-myeong (김영명) from the Uiseong Kim clan (의성 김씨).)
  - Lady, of the Andong Gwon clan (안동 권씨); given name Lo-bi (로비) (Note: Married Jo Cheong-ro (조청로) from the Pyongyang Jo clan (평양 조씨). She later became a slave of Han Hwak.)
  - Gwon Ja-sin (권자신; ?–1456)
  - Lady, of the Andong Gwon clan (안동 권씨); given name Tab-yi (탑이) (Note: Married Yun Yeong-son (윤영손). She later became a concubine of Park Gang (박강; ?–1460).)
  - Lady, of the Andong Gwon clan (안동 권씨)
  - Lady, of the Andong Gwon clan (안동 권씨)
- Husband: King Munjong (문종대왕; 15 November 1414 – 10 June 1452)
  - Father-in-law: King Sejong (세종대왕; 15 May 1397 – 8 April 1450)
  - Mother-in-law: Queen Soheon (소헌왕후), of the Cheongsong Shim clan (청송 심씨; 20 October 1395 – 28 April 1446)
- Issue
  - Unnamed daughter (1433)
  - Princess Gyeonghye (경혜공주; 1435 – 27 January 1474)
  - Yi Hong-wi (이홍위), King Danjong (단종대왕; 18 August 1441 – 16 November 1457)

== Ancestry ==
Ancestors of Queen Hyeondeok

Gwon Jeong-jung (권정중)
Gwon Baek-jong (권백종)
Gwon Jeon, Internal Prince Hwansan (청천부원군 심온)
Lady, of the Gwon clan (권씨)
Queen Hyeondeok
Choe Yong (최용)
Internal Princess Consort Haeryeong, of the Haeju Choe clan (해령부부인 해주 최씨)
Ji Bok-ryong (지복룡)
Ji Yong-gi (지용기)
Lady, of the Yeosan Song clan (여산 송씨)
Lady, of the Chungju Ji clan (충주 지씨)

== In popular culture ==
- Portrayed by Kang Hye-in in the 2008 KBS TV series The Great King, Sejong.
- Inspired a fictional queen portrayed by Oh Seung-ah in the 2018 TV Chosun TV series Grand Prince.

== See also ==
- History of Korea
- Styles and titles in Joseon
- Six martyred ministers
