= Paekchŏng =

Korean untouchable caste

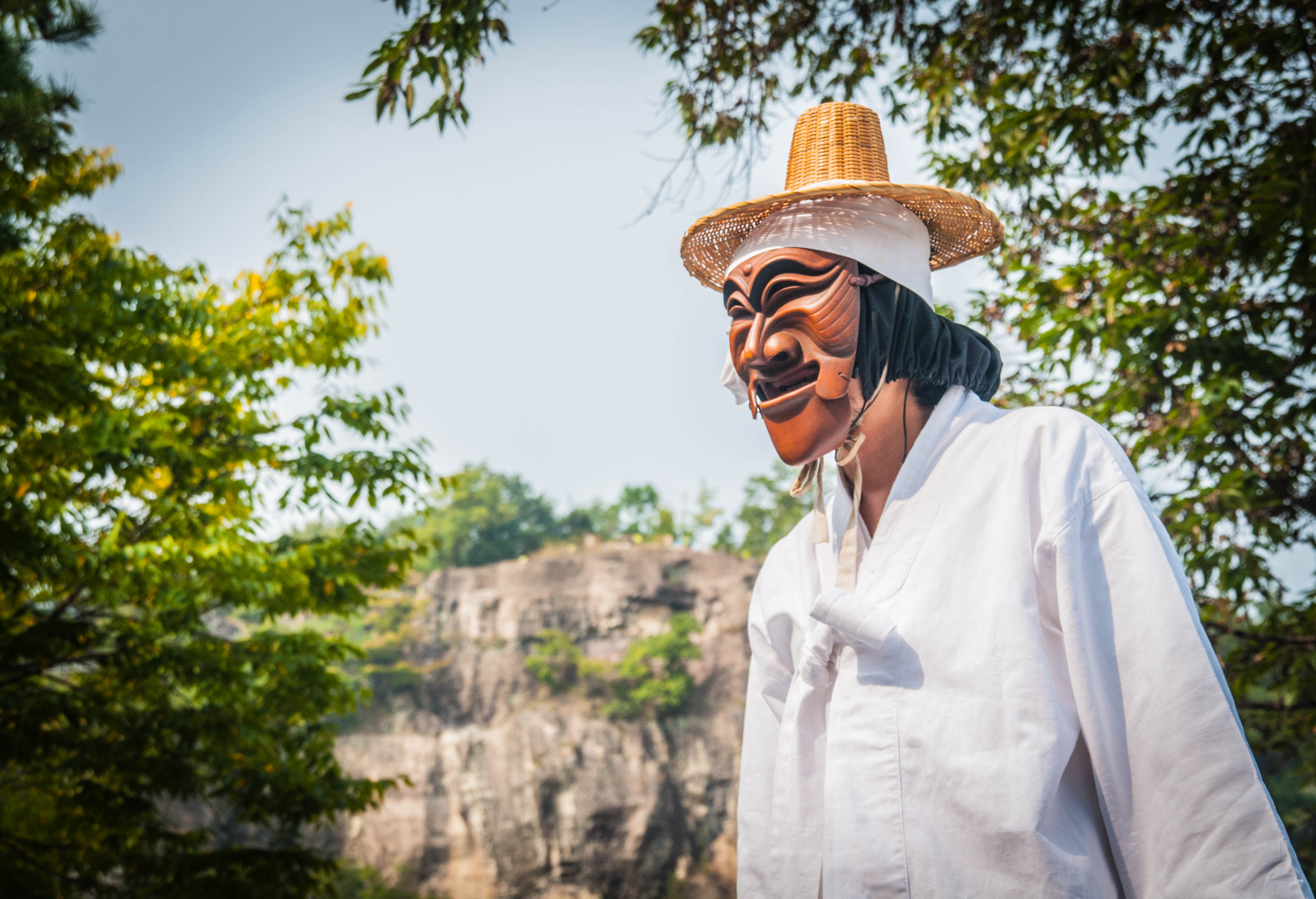
- A masked person acting as a paekchŏng butcher in a play

Korean name
- Hangul: 백정
- Hanja: 白丁
- RR: baekjeong
- MR: paekchŏng

The paekchŏng (Korean: 백정; Hanja: 白丁) were an untouchable caste in Korea, originating from some minority, nomadic groups of disputed ethnicity. Today, the word simply means a butcher.

In the early part of the Goryeo period (918–1392), these minorities were largely settled in fixed communities. However, the Mongol invasion left Korea in disarray and anomie and these groups became nomadic. Subgroups of the paekchŏng included the ch'aein (채인; 才人; lit. 'entertainers') and the hwach'ae (화채; 禾尺) or such'ae (수채; 水尺), who were primarily butchers. The paekchŏng occupied specific professions like butchery, tanning, basket weaving and performing executions.

During the Goryeo period, "paekchŏng" was used as a neutral term to refer to the common people. From the time of the Joseon dynasty, it became an insulting title used to refer to the lowest class of society. In addition, since the Joseon dynasty, "paekchŏng" has been also used to denigrate a person. In contemporary South Korea, the term is mainly associated with the meaning of a butcher and even used in the restaurants' names.

== Origin ==
Joseon class system
Class	Hangul	Hanja	Status
Yangban	양반	兩班	noble class
Chungin	중인	中人	intermediate class
Sangmin	상민	常民	common people
Ch'ŏnmin	천민	賤民	lowborn people (nobi, paekchŏng, mudang, kisaeng, namsadang, etc.)

According to Chŏng Yagyong, one of the most distinguished scholars on the methodology of historical researches in the reign of King Jeongjo (1777–1800) and King Sunjo (1801–1834), one theory holds that they were of "Tatar" origin. The term "Tartar" seems to have been a general term for all northern peoples, Mongols, Manchurians, and so on. In his book, the origin of the paekchŏng is attributed to a nomadic group from the Goryeo period known as the Yangsuch'ŏk (양수척; 楊水尺) or Mujari (무자리). Being an alien people, the Yangsuchuk were hardly assimilated into the general population. They were engaged in the making and selling of willow baskets. They were also proficient in slaughtering animals and had a liking for hunting.

== History ==
=== During the Goryeo dynasty ===
From the Goryeo period (918–1392) until the time of King Sejong of the Joseon Dynasty, paekchŏng was not used to refer to the lowest class of people. The Sino-Korean term paekchŏng (白丁) originally meant "common people", a meaning which it retains in Chinese and Japanese. Based on information in the Goryeosa, the chief surviving history of Goryeo, scholars assume that a paekchŏng is "a person who has no burden of duties (역; 役)". The term is a compound of paek (백; 白; lit. 'white/innocent/blank'), and chŏng (정; 丁; lit. 'person'). As such, paekchŏng or "blank man" connotes a group of peasants who have not been granted land because they have not received certain duties from the state.

In the Goryeo period, terms for the group which would later be known as paekchŏng were yangsuch'ŏk (양수척; 楊水尺), such'ŏk (수척; 水尺), hwach'ŏk or hwach'ae (화채; 禾尺), and mujari (무자리, probably a compound of 물 "water" and 자리 "seat, place"). They descended from the Jurchen or Khitans dating back to the beginning of Goryeo. They enjoyed group life among themselves so they continued to live in temporary residences while moving to various areas. They were distributed nationwide, but were especially concentrated in the provinces of Pyongan and Hwanghae. They were not registered in the national register.

=== Early Joseon Dynasty ===
In the early days of the founding of the Joseon Dynasty, King Sejong consolidated the various outcaste groups with ordinary farmers. This combined group was called "paekchŏng", the name of the general peasant group in the Goryeo period. King Sejong also put them on the family register, gave them lands to plant, settled them into fixed communities, and tried to keep them under state control. However, the common policies of King Sejong could not overcome the prejudices of the ordinary people, who continued to discriminate against the descendants of outcastes. Even government officials did not follow the instructions of the king.

Moreover, it seems that the paekchŏng did not change their existing lifestyle or occupation easily. They settled in one area but did not try to farm, instead engaging in the production and sale of wicker products, slaughtering, singing and dancing. In this situation, integration of the paekchŏng into the ordinary peasantry was not easy and the practice of discrimination and suppression against them continued. In particular, the mainstream group regarded the life and customs of the butchers as despicable, antisocial, non-normative, and even potentially criminal.

=== Late Joseon Dynasty ===
Near the end of the Joseon Dynasty, a mutual aid organization for the paekchŏng was established, called Sŭngdongdoga (승동도가; 承洞都家), with representatives from various communities. The organization was involved in taking action, coordinating improvements, and acting at times as the official representative of the paekchŏng in legal matters. In 1894, the Korean caste system was legally abolished by the Kabo Reform. However, social discrimination against the paekchŏng did not come to an end. The family register of paekchŏng was still separate and, under "occupation", their names were marked by the use of the word 屠漢 ("butcher") or a red dot. During the Tonghak Peasant Revolution, sixth of the 12 demands of the rebels was to no longer require the Paekchŏng to self-identify by being forced to wear the Paeraengi Hat, a straw hat. Nonetheless, the Kabo Reform ensured that paekchŏng could become officials, scholars, or artists if they had the ability. Although they were still largely limited to their traditional occupations, modified regulations in 1896 allowed non-paekchŏng to become licensed butchers, eventually leading to meat businesses which have pushed many out of one of the few occupations open to them.

However, while improvements to the social status of the paekchŏng came slowly, it was different for the commoners (the lower of the yangmin), who had economically been little different from slaves. Respect for government officials plunged in the 17th century as they fled from the invading Japanese and Manchurians, leaving the civilians at their mercy. The government also awarded many militiamen yangban class status in exchange for their voluntary militia activities against these invaders. In time, with the rise of commerce, merchants bought forged family histories and official status documents as well. Eventually, around three fourths of the population were yangban in name.

=== Modern use ===
The term baekjeong is still used in modern South Korean society. This is particularly common in occupations dealing with raw meat, which carry a negative social stigma. In spite of this, "baekjeong" is widely used in Korean restaurant names, denoting barbecue establishments where raw marinated meat is served and cooked at the table. In this context, baekjeong is descriptive and carries no negative connotation.

== Jobs ==
=== Executioner ===
Throughout much of the Joseon Dynasty, they were also forced to serve as executioners.

=== Butcher ===
The paekchŏng did jobs that no self-respecting Buddhist Korean would touch, including anything working with animals. Slaughtering animals, leather making—these kinds of unclean duties were avoided by other Koreans, and so were filled de facto by paekchŏng. In other words, the group was assigned to the most demeaning tasks in Korean society. They were also considered in moral violation of Buddhist principles, which led Koreans to see work involving meat as polluting and sinful, even if they saw the consumption as acceptable. By the latter part of the Joseon Dynasty, paekchŏng accepted the principles of Confucianism and did not slaughter for three years when their parents died.

== Discrimination ==
The group had long suffered severe social discrimination in Korean society. The paekchŏng were seen as contemptible and polluted people that others feared and avoided meeting. Paekchŏng could not live in a roof-tiled house and were not allowed to wear silk clothes or leather shoes or a gat (a traditional Korean horsehair hat). When paekchŏng went outside their houses, they had to wear a bamboo hat. A paekchŏng had to lower himself in front of a yangin and was forbidden to smoke or drink in their presence. Paekchŏng could not ride a litter or horse when they married and a married woman could not wear a hair stick. Paekchŏng were not allowed surnames and were forbidden the use of certain characters in their personal names, such as 仁 "benevolence", 義 "righteousness", 禮 "rites", or 智 "wisdom". The extent to which they were seen as impure people is well-illustrated in the fact that their bodies were kept in separate graveyards so as not to mingle with those of the yangmin.

== Influence of religion ==
Tonghak and Christianity had a lot of influence on the paekchŏng. These belief systems exposed the paekchŏng—and Koreans more generally—to concepts of egalitarianism and social equality. The influence of these religions became linked to the social movement.

=== Tonghak ===
Towards the end of the 19th century, there was an increasing impetus towards human dignity and liberalization. Of particular importance was the growth of certain religions supportive of change. Tonghak, a Korean nationalist religion, wished to end unfair conventions. Tonghak peasants had staged an uprising in 1894 in favor of human rights, especially for those low on the social ladder. Among other things, they demanded that the paekchŏng no longer be forced to wear discriminatory hats and widows be allowed to remarry. Although this uprising was ultimately unsuccessful, it was an important impetus behind the Kabo Reform, and helped to abolish the class structure that had placed legal restrictions on certain groups. However, the paekchŏng benefited much less from these changes than other groups, such as the slaves.

=== Christianity ===
The other major religious influence on human rights came through Christianity. Some missionaries had converted paekchŏng to Christianity, stating that everyone has equal rights under God. However, everyone was not equal in Christian congregations and protests erupted when missionaries attempted to integrate the baekjeon into worship services, with non-paekchŏng finding such attempts insensitive to traditional notions of social status. Thus, both Tonghak and Christianity exposed the paekchŏng, and Koreans more generally, to concepts of egalitarianism and social equality. Parallel to and supportive of the rise of these ideas were transitions occurring in Korean society as a whole, particularly with regard to social classes.

== Social movements ==
Beginning in the late 19th and early 20th centuries, the paekchŏng began to resist the open social discrimination that existed against them. In 1900, leaders from 16 counties petitioned the mayor of Jinju to be allowed to wear the same clothes and hats as other people. When others in the north refused to wear the humiliating garb traditionally expected of them and were jailed, an effort was made to release them. Growing industrialism in Korea began to erode paekchŏng dominance over certain occupations, particularly as the Japanese began to control slaughterhouses and exploit them as employees.

However, as some paekchŏng fell into financial despair, the loosening of segregation led others to profit from changes, giving them the ability to fund efforts for change. Beyond financial resources, organization was also strengthened due to the longstanding connections created through segregation and close-knit social networks. Between these human and financial resources, an emphasis on progressive models, and feelings of social deprivation and discrimination, the conditions were ripe for the paekchŏng to mobilize for change. One of the earliest of these movements was in 1910 when Chang Chip'il, later an influential member of the Hyeongpyeongsa, unsuccessfully attempted to establish a trade union for butchers. In 1921, the Jipseong Johap was established by Korean and Japanese entrepreneurs, attempting to provide poverty assistance for butchers. However, this effort for improvement of economic conditions was soon overshadowed by an organization with broader goals.

The Hyeongpyeongsa was launched in Jinju on 23 April 1923 through the alliance of wealthy or educated paekchŏng and non-paekchŏng proponents of change, advocating for "the abolition of classes and of contemptuous appellations, the enlightenment of members, and the promotion of mutual friendship among members." It advocated both for individual civil rights as well as communal fellowship, recognizing that the group must maintain its identity under the strain of changes such as urbanization and industrialization which threatened to atomize the community. Thus, the Hyeongpyeongsa pursued both an equality of human rights and the right to assimilate into the broader public, even as it worked to forge a common identity. In 1927 a number of members of the Hyeongpyeongsa were arrested for their involvement in the creation of an underground nationalist organization. Their absence was partially responsible for the organization's shift to the socialist left in the late 1920s. Power within the organization shifted several times, including the shift in 1925 from the original Chinju faction advocating educational reform to a group of Seoul intellectuals more interested in economic reforms based around traditional occupations.

At the 1931 national conference, they stirred controversy within the movement by introducing a dissolution proposal, feeling that the organization had abandoned its original aims in favor of those of the bourgeois intellectuals directing it. It was their belief that dissolution would better serve their interests as it was replaced by trade unions. The dissolution proposal failed, but not without further alienating more conservative members of the movement, who were already financially strapped from broader economic conditions in Korea. Even more fatal for the movement was the arrest of a number of young radical members, who were accused of establishing a secret communist organization, the "Hyeongpyeongsa Youth Vanguard", which authorities said demanded struggle against feudalism and the abolishment of private property. The trial related to this accusation dragged on for four years, before the defendants were found to be innocent. It appears likely that the "organization" was a construction by Japanese authorities to ensure the labor wing of the Hyeongpyeongsa would not interfere with their access to leather needed for the invasion of China. As a result, the Hyeongpyeongsa shifted to the right, abandoning progressive ideals and finally disbanding in 1935, claiming the movement's aims had successfully been met.

The growing power of the radical wing divided the movement, and much of the economic support provided by wealthier paekchŏng was pulled, particularly under the strain of the Great Depression, which had negatively impacted the meat and leather trades. The young socialists in the Hyŏngp'yŏngsa forged connections with other movements, attempting to broaden the movement and work towards "the reconstitution of Korea as a whole." More importantly, they focused on social and economic injustices affecting the paekchŏng, hoping to create an egalitarian Korean society. Their efforts included attacking social discrimination by the upper class, authorities, and "commoners" and the use of degrading language against children in public schools.

== See also ==
- Jaegaseung
- Nobi
- Untouchable (social system)
- Burakumin - The Japanese equivalent of paekchŏng.
- Cagot - Similar historically persecuted people in France and Spain

== Journal ==
- Osgood, Cornelius. 1951. The Koreans and Their Culture. New York: Ronald Press.
- Passin, Herbert. 1957. "The Paekchŏng of Korea: A Brief Social History" Monumenta Nipponica. 12 (3/4): 195–240.
- Kim, Joong-Seop. 1999. "In Search of Human Rights: The Paekchŏng Movement in Colonial Korea" Pp. 311–335 in Colonial Modernity in Korea, edited by Gi-Wook Shin and Michael Robinson. Cambridge; London: Harvard University Asia Center.
- Kim, Joong-Seop. 2003. The Korean Paekjŏng under Japanese rule: the quest for equality and human rights. London; New York: Routledge.
- 上原善広, 2006. "コリアン部落". ミリオン出版.
- 金永大, 1988. "朝鮮の被差別民衆". 解放出版社.
- 金仲燮, 2003. "衡平運動 朝鮮の被差別民・白丁その歴史とたたかい". 部落解放・人権研究所
