= Hong Soo-hyun =

South Korean actress (born 1981)

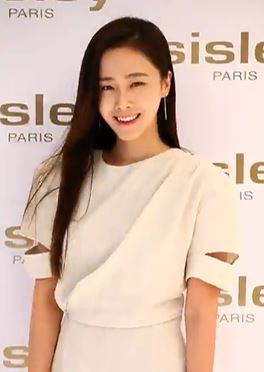
- Hong in 2017
- Born: February 15, 1981 (age 45); Incheon, South Korea
- Education: Dongduk Women's University
- Occupation: Actress
- Years active: 1996–present
- Agent: FN Entertainment
- Spouse: Unknown (m. 2021)

Korean name
- Hangul: 홍수현
- Hanja: 洪洙賢
- RR: Hong Suhyeon
- MR: Hong Suhyŏn

Hong Soo-hyun (Korean: 홍수현; born February 15, 1981) is a South Korean actress. She is best known for her roles in Dae Jo-yeong, The Princess' Man, and Goodbye Dear Wife.

== Career ==
After she debuted as a magazine model in high school, Hong appeared in a Johnson & Johnson commercial in 1996, and began her acting career in 1999. In the following decade, true stardom remained elusive as she mostly found herself restricted to supporting roles. Then Hong received strong reviews for her back-to-back strong performances in the 2011 period drama The Princess' Man as a role Princess Kyunghye, and the 2012 quirky comedy History of a Salaryman, as well as Goodbye Dear Wife (2012).

== Personal life ==
=== Marriage ===
On May 28, 2021, Hong married her non-celebrity boyfriend in a private wedding ceremony.

=== Philanthropy ===
On August 9, 2022, Hong donated ₩10 million to help those affected by the 2022 South Korean floods through the Hope Bridge Korea Disaster Relief Association.

== Filmography ==
=== Film ===
Year	Title	Role
2000	Summer story	
2001	Bungee Jumping of Their Own	Yeo Hye-su
2008	Fate	Jo Hyo-sook
2008	Rough Cut	Kang Mi-na
2009	Insadong Scandal	Choi Ha-kyeong
2010	Camellia	Seon Ah (Kamome)

=== Television series ===
Year	Title	Role	Notes/Ref.
1999	KAIST	Hong Soo-jin	
1999	Ghost		(Guest appearance)
2000	New Nonstop		(Guest appearance)
2001	Great Friends 2		(Guest appearance)
2001	Delicious Proposal	Hong Joo-ri	
2001	Orient Theatre	Harada Kasuko	
2001	Like Father, Unlike Son	Jang Jin-joo	
2001	Tender Hearts	Mi-ran	
2002	Open Drama Man & Woman: "Scandal"		guest appearance
2002	Mom's Song	Hyun Soo-jin	
2002	Let's Get Married	Moon Chae-kyung	
2003	King's Woman	Queen Inmok	
2003	Sang Doo! Let's Go to School	Han Se-ra	
2004	Drama City: "Our Ham"	herself	
2004	Ms. Kim's Million Dollar Quest	Lee Jin	
2004	My Lovely Family	Go Hee-soo	
2005	Pingguari	N/A	
2005	HDTV Literature: "The Outdoor Lamp"	N/A	
2005	Only You	Ji Soon-yeon	
2006	Tokyo Holiday	Hong Soo-hyun / Tour Guide	
2006	Banjun Drama: "Finding Lost Time"	Hong Soo-hyun	
2006	MBC Best Theater	N/A	
2006	Dae Jo-yeong	Suk-yeong	
2009	Her Style	Kong Mi-joo	
2009	Temptation of an Angel	Yoon Jae-hee / Joo Kyeong-ran	
2011	Lie to Me	Yoo So-ran	
2011	Pianissimo		
2011	The Princess' Man	Princess Gyeonghye	
2012	History of a Salaryman	Cha Woo-hee	
2012	Goodbye Dear Wife	Kang Sun-ah	
2012	KBS Drama Special: "Another Wedding"	Chae Ha-kyeong	
2013	Jang Ok-jung, Living by Love	Queen Inhyeon	
2013	A Little Love Never Hurts	Song Mi-joo	
2015	Mom	Lee Se-ryung	
2017	Mad Dog	Cha Hong-joo	
2018	The Rich Son	Kim Kyung-ha	
2018	Queen of Mystery 2	Joo Hyun-ah	
2020–2021	Cheat on Me If You Can	Baek Soo-jeong	
2021	Police University	Choi Hee-soo	
2022	From Now On, Showtime!	Kim Mi-young	Cameo
2022–2023	Red Balloon	Han Ba-da	
2023	Our Blooming Youth	Royal Consort Gye-bi	
2025	My Lovely Journey	Yoo Ha-na	
2026	No Tail to Tell	Hong Yeon-su	

=== Variety shows ===
Year	Title	Role
2010	Fashion of Cry	Cast Member
2014	Roommate	Cast Member

=== Music video appearances ===
Year	Title	Artist
2010	"I Swear"	Jo Sung-mo
2001	"Sad"	NRG
2007	"I Love You"	Lee Seung-chul
2008	"Tree"	Hong Soo-hyun
2010	"Im"	Why Love
2011	"Lucky Guy"	Kim Hyun-joong
2016	"One More Day"	Sistar, Giorgio Moroder

== Theater ==
Year	Title
2007	Bingo! The Winning Musical

== Discography ==
Album information	Track listing
Tree: Track from 상근이의 소망 album; Artist: Various; Released: December 23, 2008; Label: Universal Music Korea	Track listing: 2. 나무 (Tree) - Hong Soo-hyun
Her Style OST: Artist: Hong Soo-hyun; Released: April 14, 2009; Label: DND Music	Track listing: 1. 아침햇살; 2. 그런사랑; 3. 기억하나요 (Vocal. U)
Today Cloudy: Track from Melody Picnic; Artist: Sang Sang Band; Released: June 11, 2009; Label: SBSi	Track listing: 1. 오늘은 맑음 (Today Cloudy) - Sang Sang Band feat. Hong Soo-hyun
Traveler: Digital Single; Artist: Hong Soo-hyun; Released: March 22, 2010; Label: LOEN Entertainment	Track listing: 1. In Paris; 2. Love, Love, Love (feat. Kiggen)

== Awards and nominations ==
Year	Award	Category	Nominated work	Result	Ref.
1996	Johnson & Johnson Model Contest	Gold Prize	—N/a	Won	
2001	KBS Drama Awards	Best New Actress	Orient Theatre	Won	
2003	KBS Drama Awards	Best Supporting Actress	Sang Doo! Let's Go to School	Won	
2005	KBS Drama Awards	Excellence Award, Actress in a One-Act Drama	The Outdoor Lamp	Won	
2011	2011 KBS Drama Awards	Best Couple Award with Lee Min-woo	The Princess' Man	Won	
2011	2011 KBS Drama Awards	Excellence Award, Actress in a Mid-length Drama	The Princess' Man	Won	
2011	Monte-Carlo Television Festival	Outstanding Actress in a Drama Series	The Princess' Man	Nominated	
2012	SBS Drama Awards	Excellence Award, Actress in a Miniseries	History of a Salaryman	Nominated	
2013	MBC Drama Awards	Excellence Award, Actress in a Serial Drama	A Little Love Never Hurts	Won	
2017	KBS Drama Awards	Best Supporting Actress	Mad Dog	Nominated	
2018	MBC Drama Awards	Top Excellence Award, Actress in a Soap Opera	The Rich Son	Nominated	
2020	KBS Drama Awards	Best Supporting Actress	Cheat on Me If You Can	Nominated	
2021	KBS Drama Awards	Best Supporting Actress	Police University	Nominated	
