= Munjong of Joseon =

King of Joseon from 1450 to 1452

Munjong

King of Joseon
- Reign: 8 April 1450 – 10 June 1452
- Enthronement: 13 April 1450; Hwideokjeon, Dongbyeolgung (Note: Korean: 동별궁; Hanja: 東別宮; lit. ''Eastern Detached Palace''; located in present-day Seoul, it later became known as "Andong Byeolgung" (안동별궁; 安洞別宮).)
- Predecessor: Sejong
- Successor: Danjong

Regent of Joseon
- Tenure: 1 July 1445 – 8 April 1450
- Monarch: Sejong

Crown Prince of Joseon
- Tenure: 30 November 1421 – 8 April 1450
- Predecessor: Crown Prince Do
- Successor: Crown Prince Hong-wi
- Born: 24 November 1414; Hanseong, Joseon
- Died: 10 June 1452 (aged 37); Cheonchujeon, Gyeongbokgung, Hanseong, Joseon
- Burial: Hyeolleung, Donggureung Cluster, Guri, South Korea
- Spouses: Crown Princess Kim (m. 1427; dep. 1429) Crown Princess Bong (m. 1429; dep. 1436) Queen Hyeondeok (m. 1437; died 1441)
- Issue Detail: Princess Gyeonghye; Princess Gyeongsuk; Danjong of Joseon
Names
- Yi Hyang (이향; 李珦)
Era dates
- Adopted the era name of the Ming dynasty (Note: Gyeongtae (Jingtai) (경태; 景泰): 1450–1452)
Posthumous name
- Joseon: Great King Gongsun Heummyeong Insuk Gwangmun Seonghyo (공순흠명인숙광문성효대왕; 恭順欽明仁肅光文聖孝大王); Ming dynasty: Gongsun (공순; 恭順)
Temple name
- Munjong (문종; 文宗)
- Clan: Jeonju Yi
- Dynasty: Yi
- Father: King Sejong
- Mother: Queen Soheon
- Religion: Confucianism (Neo-Confucianism)

Korean name
- Hangul: 문종
- Hanja: 文宗
- Lit.: "Cultured Ancestor"
- RR: Munjong
- MR: Munjong

Courtesy name
- Hangul: 휘지
- Hanja: 輝之
- RR: Hwiji
- MR: Hwiji

Munjong (Korean: 문종; Hanja: 文宗; 15 November 1414 – 10 June 1452), (Note: In the Korean calendar (lunisolar), he was born on the 3rd day of the 10th lunar month and died on the 14th day of the 5th lunar month.) personal name Yi Hyang, was the fifth monarch of Joseon. He was the eldest son of Sejong the Great and the father of the ill-fated King Danjong.

== Biography ==
Yi Hyang was the longest serving heir apparent during the Joseon period, holding the position for a record 29 years.

In January 1421, Sejong instructed that his eight-year-old son be educated by scholars from the Hall of Worthies, then in October the same year, he was invested as crown prince and sent to study at the Sungkyunkwan. From 1442 until his own ascension to the throne in 1450, Yi Hyang served as regent and took care of state affairs during the final years of his father's reign, as Sejong developed various illnesses and disorders.

Most of his achievements were during his time as crown prince. Although credit is primarily given to Chang Yŏngsil for inventing the water gauge, the Veritable Records of the Joseon Dynasty affirm that it was the prince who found measures of water levels in the ground. Yi Hyang also contributed to the development of the Korean vernacular script (today known as Hangul).

== Reign ==
Yi Hyang ascended to the throne as King Munjong in 1450, and his reign marked the beginning of an imbalance of power at the Joseon court. Gim Bi-hwan describes the "interaction of the royal authority, administrative power, remonstrative power, and the collective authority of scholars outside the office," before Munjong as contributing to a situation that allowed the country to function constitutionally. During Munjong's reign, however, the balance collapsed, setting the stage for his brother to lead a coup d'etat in 1452 against Munjong's son.

Munjong's reign also saw the demolition of Gyejodang Hall, a building within Gyeongbokgung Palace, a facility that was used by Munjong when he was crown prince to handle state affairs on behalf of his father, Sejong and to greet foreign envoys.

During the reign of Munjong, books such as the Goryeosa and the Goryeosa Jeolyo were written. He was also deeply interested in military matters, and reformed the army into five sas from the previous twelve.

Munjong died on 10 June 1452 at the age of 37, likely of septicemia caused by infected boils. He was succeeded by his eldest son Danjong, who was only 12 at the time and was forced to abdicate in 1455 in favor of his uncle Grand Prince Seyong, who became King Sejo.

== Marriage ==
Munjong was first married to Lady Gim of the (old) Andong Gim clan, between 1427 and 1429. She reportedly used witchcraft to gain his love. She also burned the shoes of Munjong's concubine, and made her drink the ashes with alcohol. When her father-in-law, King Sejong, found out about these actions, he deposed her.

The same year his first wife was ousted, Munjong remarried to Lady Bong of the Haeum Bong clan. She was deposed in 1436, when it was discovered that she had a homosexual love affair with one of her palace maids named So-ssang (소쌍).

Lastly, in 1437, Lady Gwon of the Andong Gwon clan became the third wife of Munjong, while he was still the crown prince. Originally a concubine, she gave birth to two daughters, one of whom was Princess Gyeonghye, and to Yi Hong-wi, Mujong's only surviving son, who later became King Danjong. Lady Gwon died in 1441, soon after the birth of her son, and when her husband took the throne, she was posthumously honored as "Queen Hyeondeok" (현덕왕후).

== Family ==
- Father: King Sejong (세종대왕; 15 May 1397 – 8 April 1450)
  - Grandfather: King Taejong (태종대왕; 21 June 1367 – 8 June 1422)
  - Grandmother: Queen Wongyeong (원경왕후), of the Yeoheung Min clan (여흥 민씨; 6 August 1365 – 27 August 1420)
- Mother: Queen Soheon (소헌왕후), of the Cheongsong Shim clan (청송 심씨; 20 October 1395 – 28 April 1446)
  - Grandfather: Shim On (심온), Internal Prince Cheongcheon (청천부원군; 1375 – January 1419)
  - Grandmother: Grand Princess Consort of Samhan State (삼한국대부인), of the Sunheung An clan (순흥 안씨; ?–1444)

Consort(s) and their respective issue

- Deposed Crown Princess (폐빈), of the (old) Andong Kim clan (구 안동 김씨)
- Deposed Crown Princess (폐빈), of the Haeum Bong clan (하음 봉씨)
- Queen Hyeondeok (현덕왕후), of the Andong Gwon clan (안동 권씨; 26 April 1418 – 19 August 1441), given name Sun-im (순임)
  - Unnamed daughter (1433)
  - Princess Gyeonghye (경혜공주; 1435 – 27 January 1474), first daughter
  - Yi Hong-wi (이홍위), King Danjong (단종대왕; 18 August 1441 – 16 November 1457), first son
- Concubine Suk (숙빈), of the Namyang Hong clan (남양 홍씨)
  - Unnamed daughter (1441–1444)
- Sugui (숙의), of the Nampyeong Mun clan (남평 문씨; 1426–1508)
- Soyong (소용), of the Munhwa Yu clan (문화 유씨)
- Soyong (소용), of the Andong Gwon clan (안동 권씨)
- Soyong (소용), of the Dongnae Jeong clan (동래 정씨)
  - Unnamed son
- Soyong (소용), of the Papyeong Yun clan (파평 윤씨)
- Palace Lady (상궁), of the Jang clan (장씨) (Note: Sanggung (상궁; 尚宫); female official of the senior fifth rank in the internal court.)
  - Unnamed son
- Palace Lady (사칙), of the Yang clan (양씨; 1414–?) (Note: Sachik (사칙; 司則); female official in the crown prince's palace, whose rank was equivalent to the junior sixth rank in the internal court. Known as suchik (수칙; 守則) from the mid-15th century.)
  - Princess Gyeongsuk (경숙옹주; 1439–?), second daughter
  - Unnamed daughter (1450–1451)

== Ancestry ==
Ancestors of Munjong of Joseon

Yi Ja-chun, King Hwanjo (환조대왕 이자춘)
King Taejo (태조대왕)
Queen Uihye, of the Yeongheung Choe clan (의혜왕후 영흥 최씨)
King Taejong (태종대왕)
Han Gyeong, Internal Prince Ancheon (안천부원군 한경)
Queen Sinui, of the Cheongju Han clan (신의왕후 청주 한씨)
Grand Princess Consort of Samhan State, of the Saknyeong Shin clan (삼한국대부인 삭녕 신씨)
King Sejong (세종대왕)
Min Byeon (민변)
Min Je, Internal Prince Yeoheung (여흥부원군 민제)
Lady, of the Yangcheon Heo clan (양천 허씨)
Queen Wongyeong, of the Yeoheung Min clan (원경왕후 여흥 민씨)
Song Seon (송선)
Grand Princess Consort of Samhan State, of the Yeosan Song clan (삼한국대부인 여산 송씨)
Lady, of the Dalseong Ha clan (달성 하씨)
King Munjong
Shim Ryong (심룡)
Shim Deok-bu (심덕부)
Lady, of the Kim clan (김씨)
Shim On, Internal Prince Cheongcheon (청천부원군 심온)
Mun Pil-dae (문필대)
Lady, of the Incheon Mun clan (인천 문씨)
Queen Soheon, of the Cheongsong Shim clan (소헌왕후 청송 심씨)
An Cheon-bo (안천보)
Grand Princess Consort of Samhan State, of the Sunheung An clan (삼한국대부인 순흥 안씨)
Lady, of the Yeongju Kim clan (영주 김씨)

== In popular culture ==
- Portrayed by Hwang Chi-hoon in the 1983 MBC TV series The King of Chudong Palace.
- Portrayed by Jeon Moo-song in the 1998 KBS1 TV series The King and the Queen.
- Portrayed by Oh Eun-chan and Lee Sang-yeob in the 2008 KBS TV series The Great King, Sejong.
- Portrayed by Park Jung-chul in the 2008 film The Divine Weapon.
- Portrayed by Jung Dong-hwan in the 2011 KBS2 TV series The Princess' Man.
- Portrayed by Sunwoo Jae-duk in the 2011 JTBC TV series Insu, the Queen Mother.
- Portrayed by Kim Tae-woo in 2013 film The Face Reader.
- Portrayed by Han Jeong-woo and Choi Seung-hoon in the 2016 KBS1 TV series Jang Yeong-sil.

== See also ==
- History of Korea
- List of monarchs of Korea
- Styles and titles in Joseon

== Sources ==
- Kim, Bi-Hwan (2014). "A Constitutionalist Interpretation of Confucian Politics in the Early Joseon Dynasty". In Kang, Jung In (ed.). Contemporary Korean Political Thought in Search of a Post-Eurocentric Approach. London: Lexington Books. pp. 243–266.
- Jung, Jae-Hoon (2006). "Royal Education of Princes in the Reign of King Sejong". The Review of Korean Studies. 9 (3): 133–152.
- Yeon, Jaehoon (2010). "Was the Korean alphabet a sole invention of King Sejong?". Journal of Korean Culture. 14: 1–20.

Munjong of Joseon House of Yi Born: 15 November 1414 Died: 10 June 1452
Royal titles
Preceded by Sejong	King of Joseon; 8 April 1450 – 10 June 1452	Succeeded by Danjong
