= Ch'ŏnmin =

Korean lower caste

- Hangul: 천민
- Hanja: 賤民
- RR: cheonmin
- MR: ch'ŏnmin
- IPA: [tɕʰʌnmin]

Ch'ŏnmin (Korean: 천민; Hanja: 賤民), or "vulgar commoners", were the lowest caste of commoners in dynastical Korea. They abounded during the Goryeo (918–1392) and Joseon (1392–1897) periods of Korea's agrarian bureaucracy.

== Social class system ==
Joseon class system
Class	Hangul	Hanja	Status
Yangban	양반	兩班	noble class
Chungin	중인	中人	intermediate class
Sangmin	상민	常民	common people
Ch'ŏnmin	천민	賤民	lowborn people (nobi, paekchŏng, mudang, kisaeng, namsadang, etc.)

In the caste system in Korea, this social class was largely hereditary and based on certain professions considered "unclean" by the upper classes. This list of unclean professions included butchers, shamans, shoemakers, metalworkers, prostitutes, magicians, sorcerers, jail-keepers, and performers (like the kisaeng). Nobi (slaves) were servants taken from the ch'ŏnmin class to serve yangban (aristocracy) and royalty, but like slaves, they were considered the property of their owners and could be given away to other high-ranking people.

Kisaeng, female entertainers for yangban, were in this class, educated but not respected by others in society. The hereditary nature of the caste system bred institutionalized discrimination and prejudice early on in Korea's history, as the ch'ŏnmin were barred from most forms of social advancement, including entry into government service or taking the gwageo civil service examinations.

The ch'ŏnmin, although a step above the traditional caste of untouchables or outcasts called the paekchŏng, lived segregated lives, like the paekchŏng, isolated from the rest of society and shunted away in ghettoes far away from the rest of society. While the ch'ŏnmin performed tasks that other Koreans considered unclean or undignified, they still had an essential function and role within dynastic Korean society. Their work as butchers, shoemakers, low-class entertainers, performing unclean jobs, provided services to the other classes that were unavailable from anyone else.

== Legacy ==
While the class and caste system of dynastical Korea no longer exists and has largely disappeared in the modern era, remnants of such social discrimination based solely on one's occupation or a forebear's previous line of work continue to shape traditional Korean thinking and values today.

== Exceptions ==
In all the history of the Joseon Dynasty there are only a few extraordinary examples of a ch'ŏnmin who overcame their class status.

Royal Noble Consort Sukbin Choe gained the highest rank of a royal noble consort in Joseon, just one step under the Queen. Choe, the mother of King Yeongjo, originally entered the Palace as a musuri or a slave-girl. Due to his mother's humble origins, Yeongjo suffered multiple attempts on his life when he was named Crown Prince during the reign of his half brother. Although he was adopted by Queen Inwon and was under her protection, many nobles were against a low-born prince ruling the country as king.

Jang Geum (fl. early 16th century), originally an uinyŏ of the ch'ŏnmin class, became the first female Royal Physician in Korean history. According to the Annals of the Joseon Dynasty King Jungjong recognized Jang Geum's medical knowledge and entrusted her the royal care of all royal family members. King Jungjong promoted Jang Geum to become the third highest-ranking officer in the Court, and she was granted the use of dae (Korean: 대; Hanja: 大; RR: dae; MR: tae; lit. 'great') before her first name.

== See also ==
- Korean culture
- Untouchable (social system)
