= Princess Gyeonghye =

Joseon princess (1436–1473)

Princess Gyeonghye 경혜공주
- Tenure: 1436–1461; 1461–1474
- Born: 1436; Gyeongbokgung, Hanseong, Joseon
- Died: 17 January 1474 (aged 37–38); Joseon
- Burial: Daeja-dong, Deogyang District, Goyang, Gyeonggi Province
- Spouse: Jeong Jong (m. 1450–1461)
- Issue: 1. Lady Jeong; 2. Jeong Mi-su
- House: Yi
- Father: Munjong of Joseon
- Mother: Queen Hyeondeok of the Andong Kwon clan

Princess Gyeonghye (Korean: 경혜공주; 1436 – 17 January 1474 (Note: In Lunar Calendar, the Princess died on 30 December 1473)), also known before as Princess Pyeongchang before her marriage, was a Joseon princess and the eldest child of Munjong of Joseon. She served as guardian for her only younger brother, Danjong of Joseon, when he ascended the throne underage.

== Biography ==
The princess was born into the Jeonju Yi clan in 1436 to Yi Hyang, Crown Prince Hyang and Crown Princess Hyeondeok, who died later in 1441 after giving birth to her younger brother. Prior to her birth, the Princess had an older sister born in 1434 but she died in 1438. She was later enfeoffed as Princess Pyeongchang (Korean: 평창; Hanja: 平昌郡主). At some point during her childhood, Princess Pyeongchang was sent to live with a government minister, Jo Yu-rye (조유례), for safety. Munjong later noted that she regarded Jo as a foster father.

In January 1450, the princess married to Jeong Jong of the Haeju Jeong clan and was granted the title Princess Gyeonghye. Jeong was raised to the position of Minister of Justice. The next year, Munjong of Joseon granted her land at Yangdeokbang (양덕방) to build a new mansion. Officials argued against this, as it required removing more than 30 families and Jeong already had a mansion, but the gift was bestowed anyway. She eventually birthed a daughter in an unknown year, but she died prematurely. In 1452, Princess Gyeonghye's brother ascended the throne and she acted as his guardian. Although along with the general Kim Chongsŏ, she attempted to strengthen royal authority, a coup led by her uncle, Yi Yu, Grand Prince Suyang ended with her brother's banishment.

== Reign of Sejo ==
In 1455, Jeong was banished to Gwangju, Gyeonggi Province and Princess Gyeonghye fell ill. Hearing of her illness, the new king Sejo of Joseon sent a servant to tend her, who Princess Gyeonghye used to send a message begging for Jeong to be restored, which was allowed. She was pregnant with her second child at the time and Sejo threatened that if she had a boy, the child would be killed. Queen Jeonghui, however, issued instructions that the child be spared regardless of its sex, telling the eunuch in charge that she would take responsibility for deceiving Sejo. After Princess Gyeonghye gave birth to her son in 1456 in exile in Gwangju, Jeolla Province, the eunuch dressed the child in female clothes and took him to the court where he was raised.

In 1461, Jeong was found guilty of rebelling against, with Buddhist monks, Sejo of Joseon and was executed by dismemberment. Princess Gyeonghye was judged guilty by association, her rank was reduced to nobi serf (Hanja: 公女婢), and she was sent to the official royal convent, Jeongeobwon (now Cheongryong Temple, 청룡사). Queen Jeonghui later intervened on the princess' behalf, persuading Sejo to restore her status, property, and servants.

== Legacy and Death ==
On 27 December 1473, Princess Gyeonghye wrote a will; expressing her sorrow in not having her son married, describing her declining health, leaving her house in Jeongseon-bang, Hanyang and property in Tongjin (now Gimpo), Gyeonggi Province to him. Towards the end of her will, she urges her son to build a shrine to his grandfather, perform ancestral rites in accordance with Confucian tradition, and to pass down the duty to his descendants. The will is in the Jangseogak, housed by the Academy of Korean Studies.

On 17 January 1474, the princess died during King Seongjong's 5th year of reign. Her tomb was said to be built by Chŏng Inji with her tombstone written with the royal title of "Princess Pyeongchang".

When Jeong Mi-su came of age, he married the second daughter, Lady Lee of the Jeonui Lee clan, of Lee Deok-ryang, and had a concubine. He had no children of his own so he adopted a 7th degree nephew from his clan. It is said that her son became close to his aunt-in-law and former Queen Jeongsun during her time in Jeongeobwon; acting as a maternal figure to him. Even after Jeong died in 1512 during King Jungjong's 24th year of reign, he had her rites performed when she died in 1521 by his descendants as well.

== Titles ==
- 1436 – January 1450: Her Royal Highness, Princess Pyeongchang of the Second Senior Rank (평창군주; 平昌郡主)
- January 1450 – 17 January 1474: Her Royal Highness, Princess Gyeonghye of Joseon (조선 경혜공주; 朝鲜 庆惠公主)

== Family ==
- Father
  - Munjong of Joseon (조선 문종; 15 November 1414 – 1 June 1452)
- Mother
  - Queen Hyeondeok of the Andong Kwon clan (현덕왕후 권씨; 17 April 1417 – 10 August 1441)
- Siblings
  - Unnamed older sister (1434–1438)
  - Younger brother: Danjong of Joseon (조선 단종; 23 July 1441 – 24 December 1457)
- Spouse
  - Jeong Jong of the Haeju Jeong clan (정종; 鄭悰; 1430–1461)
- Issue
  - Daughter: Lady Jeong of the Haeju Jeong clan (해주 정씨); died prematurely
  - Son: Jeong Mi-su (정미수; 鄭眉壽; 1456–1512)
    - Adopted grandson: Jeong Seung-hyu (정승휴; 鄭承休; 1488–1534)

== Popular culture ==
- Portrayed by Hong Soo-hyun in the 2011 KBS2 TV series The Princess' Man.
- Portrayed by Kim Bo-mi in the 2016 KBS1 TV series Jang Yeong-sil.
