= Yangban =

Historical Korean aristocratic caste

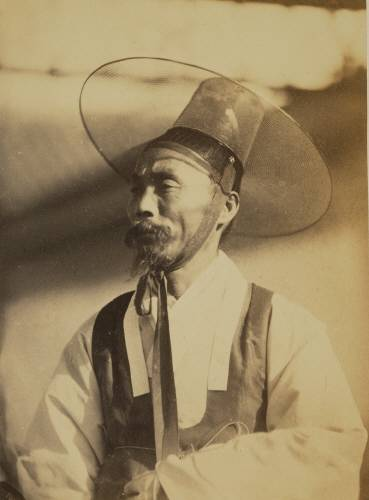
- A Korean official during his stay in China, 1863

Korean name
- Hangul: 양반/량반
- Hanja: 兩班
- RR: yangban/ryangban
- MR: yangban/ryangban

Joseon class system
Class	Hangul	Hanja	Status
Yangban	양반	兩班	aristocratic class
Chungin	중인	中人	middle class
Sangmin	상민	常民	common people
Ch'ŏnmin	천민	賤民	lowborn people (nobi, paekchŏng, mudang, kisaeng, namsadang, etc.)

The yangban (Note: South Korean standard language) or ryangban (Note: North Korean standard language) (Korean: 양반/량반; Hanja: 兩班; IPA: [(ɾ)jaŋban]) were the ruling class during the Joseon period of dynastic Korea. They were highly educated aristocrats who individually exemplified the Korean Confucian form of the scholar-official. They largely served as government administrators and oversaw medieval and early modern Korea's traditional agrarian bureaucracy until the turn of the 20th century. In a broader sense, an office holder's family and descendants, as well as rural gentry families who claimed such descent, were socially accepted as yangban.

In contemporary Korean language, the term yangban can be used either as a compliment or insult.

== Etymology ==
Yangban literally means "two branches" of administration: munban (문반; 文班) which comprises civil administrators and muban (무반; 武班) which comprises martial office holders. The term yangban first appeared sometime during late Goryeo but gained wider usage during the Joseon period. However, from the sixteenth century onward yangban increasingly came to denote local wealthy families who were mostly believed to be the descendants of once high-ranking officials. As more of the population aspired to become yangban and gradually succeeded in doing so in the late Joseon period by purchasing the yangban status, the privileges and splendor the term had inspired slowly vanished. It even gained a diminutive connotation.

A group of yangban women attending a family ritual. Late 18th century.

== Overview ==
Unlike noble titles in the European and Japanese aristocracies, which were conferred on a hereditary basis, the bureaucratic position of yangban was granted by law to yangban who meritoriously passed state-sponsored civil service exams called gwageo (과거; 科擧). These exams were modeled on the imperial examinations first started during the Goryeo dynasty of Korea. Upon passing these exams—which tested knowledge of the Confucian classics and history with poetry—several times, yangban was usually assigned to a government post. It was theoretically decided that a yangban family that did not produce a government official for more than three generations could lose its status and become commoners. This theoretical rule was never actually applied, but motivated yangban to study harder. In theory, a member of any social class except nobi, baekjeong (Korean untouchables), and children of concubines could take the government exams and become a yangban. In reality, only the upper classes—i.e., the children of yangban—possessed the financial resources and the wherewithal to pass the exams, for which years of studying were required. These barriers and financial constraints effectively excluded most non-yangban families and the lower classes from competing for yangban status, just like scholar-officials in China.

Yangban status on a provincial level was de facto hereditary. In the early Joseon Dynasty, if no one from a noble family had held a government position for four generations, they were deprived of that position. However, due to budgetary shortages from the wars of the 16th century and the disasters caused by the Little Ice Age, the government issued a tool called Gongmyeongcheop, a means of purchasing and selling government positions, and the existing caste system collapsed. As a result, genealogy rather than official position became a means of proving one's status as a nobleman, and the status of Yangban changed to a hereditary form. It was customary to include all descendants of the office holders in the hyangan (향안; 鄕案), a document that listed the names and lineages of local yangban families. The hyangan was maintained on blood basis, and one could be cut off from it if members of the family married social inferiors, such as tradesmen. Although the hyangan was not legally supported by government acts or statutes, the families listed in it were socially respected as yangban. Their householders had the customary right to participate in the hyangso (향소; 鄕所), a local council from which they could exercise influence on local politics and administration. By reserving and demanding socio-political power through local instruments such as hyangan and hyangso, yangban automatically passed down their status to posterity in local magnate families, with or without holding central offices. These provincial families of gentility were often termed jaejisajok (재지사족; 在地士族), meaning "the country families". while legally yangban meant high-ranking officials, in reality it included almost all descendants of the former and increasingly lost its legal exactitude.

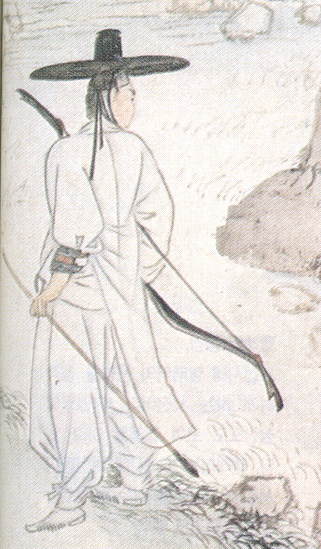
A leisure class: a yangban takes a break while hunting. Hyewon, early 19th century.

Throughout Joseon history, the monarchy and the yangban existed on the slave labor of the lower classes, particularly the sangmin, whose bondage to the land as indentured servants enabled the upper classes to enjoy a perpetual life of leisure—i.e., the life of "scholarly" gentlemen. These practices effectively ended in 1894 during the Korean Empire of Gwangmu Reform.

In today's Korea, the yangban legacy of patronage based on common educational experiences, teachers, family backgrounds, and hometowns continues in some forms officially and unofficially. In South Korea, the practice exists among the upper class and power elite, where patronage among the conglomerates tends to predictably follow blood, school, and hometown ties. In North Korea, a de facto yangban class exists that is based mostly on military and party alliances.

== History ==
Yangban were the Joseon period equivalent of the former Goryeo nobles who had been educated in Buddhist and Confucian studies. With the succession of the Yi generals in the Joseon dynasty, prior feuds and factions were quelled through a decisive attempt to instill administrative organization throughout Korea and create a new class of agrarian bureaucrats. The individual yangban included members of this new class of bureaucrats and former Goryeo nobility. While ostensibly open to all, the civil service exams catered to the lifestyle and habits of the yangban, which created a semi-hereditary meritocracy, as yangban families overwhelmingly possessed the minimum education, uninterrupted study time and immense financial resources to pass such exams. The yangban, like the Mandarins before them, dominated the Royal Court and military of pre-Modern Korea and often were exempt from laws including those relating to taxes.

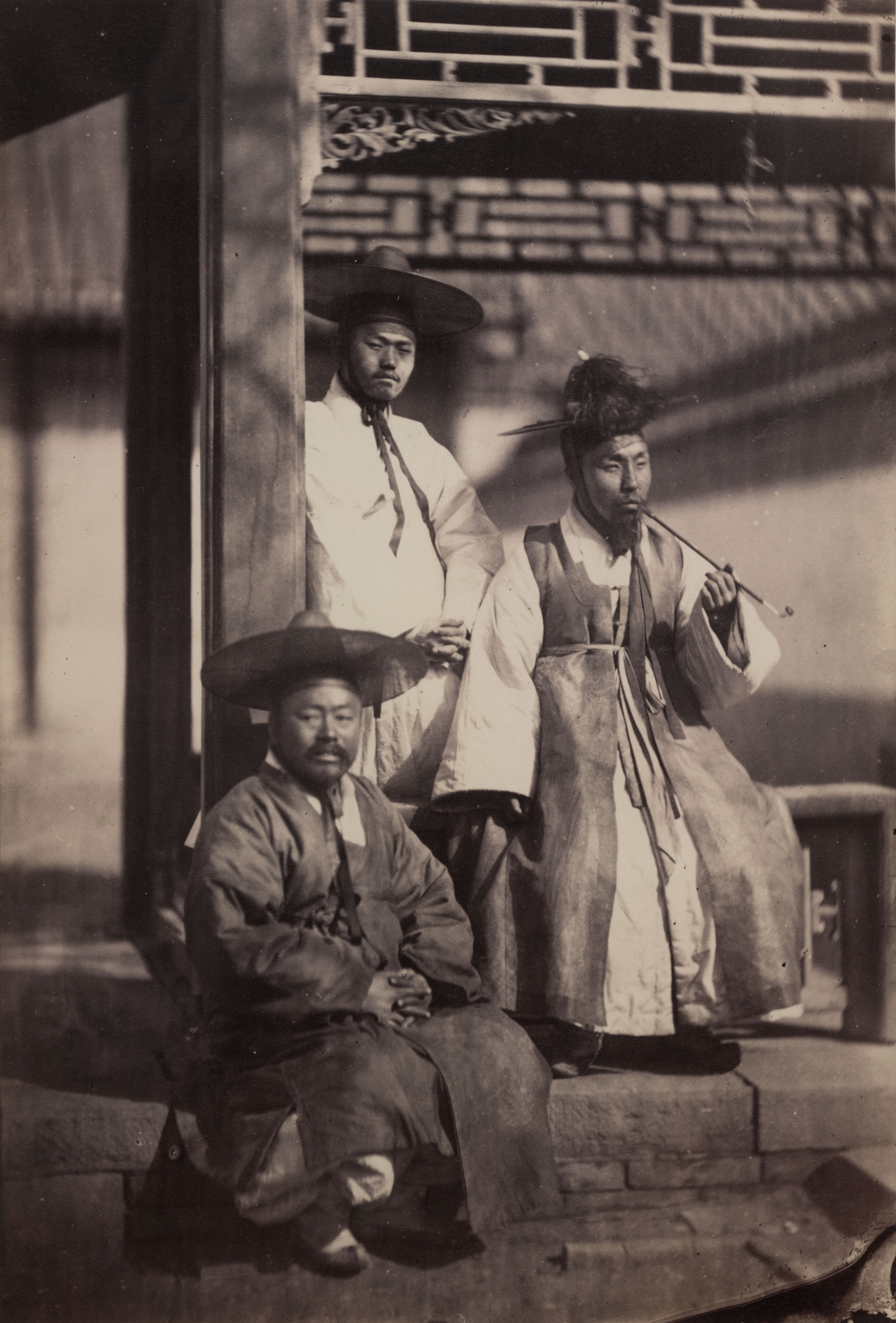
One of the earliest photographs depicting yangban, taken in 1863.

There were at most 100 positions open with thousands of candidates taking the exams. Competition that was originally supposed to bring out the best in each candidate gave way to the importance of familial relationships. Because the Joseon Court was constantly divided among the Northern, Southern, Eastern, and Western faction members (the eccentric geographical naming derived from the location of each leader's house in Seoul which was divided into subsections), a divided system resulted where corruption was very difficult. With each faction constantly probing for an excuse to kill off the other, if one faction was proven to be corrupt then the other factions would immediately jump on the chance to purge them. The attempt to receive or give bribes on a massive scale was suicide. It wasn't until the reign of King Sunjo that the Kim clan of Andong in cooperation with few other blood-related grandee clans obtained full control over the court — after purging their rival factions and other rival clans in their own political faction the Joseon bureaucracy degenerated into corruption. At this level the exceptionally powerful families could be more properly referred to as sedoga (세도가; 勢道家) instead of mere yangban, which by then came to include shades of classes other than the grandees.

From the sixteenth century and increasingly during the seventeenth and eighteenth centuries, high-ranking offices were monopolized by a few grandee families based in Seoul or the Han River Valley, therefore blocking any chance of gaining high-ranking posts by many provincial families of pedigree. However, provincial magnates began to refer to themselves as yangban whether they held government offices or not. As more families claimed to be yangban and exercised provincial influences through local institutions the term lost its original meaning and became a sort of social status with a confusing legal standing. Its economic and cultural domain was clear, though. A landlord who studied classics at a seowon could be easily looked upon as yangban by the local populace. People could now purchase yangban status by paying for a procuration for a lower government post or a jokbo, the noble pedigree.

Nearly all yangban of upper-high ranking grandee to lower-ranking provincial landlord status suddenly lost their ancient political, social, and economic power during the twentieth century. The legality of yangban was abolished in 1894. Subsequently, their political and administrative role was replaced by the Japanese colonial government and its administrators, although some yangban maintained their wealth and power by cooperating with the Japanese. However, the erosion of the idea of complete and exclusive power was irreversible. During the period of Japanese colonial rule, the privileged yangban class, comprising largely those who did not actively resist Japan because of the pro-Japanese policies, gained advantages. They ventured into various industries such as printing, textiles, rubber, clothing, and brewing. Accumulating wealth, they expanded their ventures into sectors requiring technological expertise, including machinery, chemicals, automobiles, and shipbuilding. These individuals were less affected by Japanese policies and sometimes even benefited from them, allowing them to accumulate more wealth than other social strata. However, they did not receive the same treatment as the Japanese aristocracy under Japanese rule. There were limitations as both social classes and businesses remained dependent on Japan, and the profits flowed back to the Japanese upper class. Unlike popular narratives in Korean minjung scholarship, after the outbreak of the Korean War, the influence of the Yangban class and discrimination against the common people persisted.

In modern-day Korea, the yangban as a social class with legal status and landed wealth no longer exists either in the north or the south. Nevertheless, those who are well-connected in Korean society are sometimes said to have yangban connections. Though these claims may have some merit, such references are not usually intended to suggest any real yangban lineage or ancestry. Today, the yangban have been replaced by the Korean ruling class, i.e., an elite class of business and government elites, who dominate the country through their wealth, power and influence channeled through their familial and social networks. (This applies to North and South Korea, though the North's elite class is largely military-based.) The word is also used, at least in South Korea, as a common reference (sometimes with distinctly negative connotations, reflecting the negative impression the class system and its abuses left on Koreans as a whole) to an older, sometimes cantankerous or stubborn man. Some descendants of Yangban families still maintain a formidable presence thanks to the remnants of their superiority and vestiges of privilege, standing significantly above the common populace.

== Fashion ==
Yangban fashion during the Joseon Dynasty was more than just a question of personal preference, but was a reflection of complex society systems and beliefs profoundly rooted in Confucian ideas. Men's clothing varied in form depending on their social status, occupation, and circumstances. Generally, men wore jeogori (jackets), baji (pants), and po (outer garments) as basic attire. Commoners and lower-class individuals typically wore simple garments made of plain-colored cotton or hemp, while the upper class, such as the Yangban, utilized luxurious materials and colors. The attire of the Yangban class featured intricate details, materials, and accompanying accessories which reflected the wearer's societal status. A person's attire differed based on their jobs and titles, and was also a reflection of the respect to be given to them and their family lineage. The Hanbok of Yangban is beyond the general hanbok style and is known as po (포). Po has multiple variations but the most popular is known as dopo (도포), a long gown with an additional section that covers the lower back and features a slit that gives a wavy design. Layering was also a feature of Yangban Hanbok based on the weather or season and was often colorful.

The hair was tied into an up-top bun and the temple was bound with a band known as 망건 (mang-geon), which had a stone known as 풍잠 (pung-jam) in the middle that covered the bun to symbolize uniformity. The top bun was egg-shaped and used a hairpin known as 빈녀 (binyeo) to maintain its structure. The tightness with which 망건 (mang-geon) was tied was associated with the level of fashion a Yangban was knowledgeable in. 망건 Mang-geon was tied to a button-like stone on either side near the ears known as 관자 (kwan–ja). These kwan–ja helped to assess a Yangban's rank based on their material and size; for example, a big golden kwan–ja meant the person belonged to higher class.

Another feature was the accessories. Earrings were worn by Yangban from the early Joseon dynasty and by people of all ages until the 14th Joseon king, San-Jo, banned them due to discrimination by other countries during war. Similar to the modern day watch, an accessory of Yangban that was always seen in their hands was a hand fan known as 부채 (bu-chae), of which many different types and designs symbolized rank and various other elements of social hierarchy.

Hats were also a huge part of Yangban fashion. Hats known as 갓 (gat), shaped in a large cylindrical top that covered the hair, featured a brooch on the top known as 정자 (jung-ja), as well as some fashionable elements such as string with beads and other items depending on the wearer's personal preference and hierarchical rank. In the royal family, the number of strings adorning a hat worn by the king or prince determined their ranks.

Shoes worn by Yangban were of two kinds: low-ankle shoes known as hye (혜; 鞋) and high-cut shoes known as hwa (화; 靴). These two were strictly worn by the elite class. Footwear was also divided based on the material. Commoners wore wooden clogs or straw shoes daily, whereas Yangban and royal families wore leather shoes known as 갓신 (gatsin) with beautiful patterns and colors.

As highlighted by Lee Youngjae, the portrayal of Hanbok in Shin Yun-Bok's paintings offers invaluable insights into the attire of the ruling class during this period. These garments, with their vivid colors and luxurious fabrics, symbolized not only the wearer's social standing but also adherence to Confucian ideals. Yi et al. (2007) further emphasizes the significance of traditional Korean outfit, demonstrating how apparel acted as a visible depiction of one's social status, with minor distinctions designating rank and connection.

The colorful garments were exclusive to the Yangban class. From an economic standpoint, red was a highly luxurious item during the Joseon Dynasty. To dye a single set of deep red clothing required the cultivation of madder plants (홍람; 紅藍), and it took as much farmland to grow these plants as would yield enough grain to feed a family of four for a month. Furthermore, fabric dyed in a rich red hue costs more than four times the value of white cloth. Consequently, commoners dared not even contemplate using deep red colors.

== List of Yangban families ==
- Gyeongju Kim clan (or "Gim"): ruling clan of Silla, descendants of King Alji
- Jinju Kang clan ("Gang"): old military clan of the Korean Peninsula
- Jinju Ha clan: Yangban clan of Goryeo and Joseon
- Jeonju Yi clan ("Lee"): ruling clan of Joseon
- Wonju Won clan: Yangban clan of Joseon
- Andong Kim clan ("Gim"): Yangban clan of Joseon
- Munhwa Ryu clan ("Yu"): Yangban clan of Joseon
- Pungyang Jo clan ("Cho"): Yangban clan of Joseon
- House Seo of Dalseong: Yangban clan of Joseon
- Bannam Bak clan: Yangban clan of Joseon
- Deoksu Yi clan ("Lee")
- Yeonan Yi clan: Yangban clan of Joseon
- Cheongju Han clan
- Cheongsong Shim clan: Yangban clan of Joseon
- Cheongpung Kim clan: Yangban clan of Joseon
- Dongneh Jeong clan: Yangban clan of Joseon
- Yeonil Jeong clan ("Chung"): noble clan of Silla, Goryeo, and Joseon
- Miryang Bak clan ("Park"): ruling clan of Silla, descendants of Bak Hyeokgeose
- Wolseong Seok clan (or "Gyeongju Seok clan"; 경주 석씨): ruling clan of early Silla
- Euiryeong Nam clan: Yangban clan of Joseon
- Changnyeong Seong clan: Yangban clan of Joseon
- Gyeongju Yi clan ("Lee")
- Yeoheung Min clan
- Wonju Byeon clan
- Namyang Hong clan
- Naju Na clan
- Andong Gwon clan: Yangban clan of Joseon
- Eunjin Song clan: Yangban clan of Joseon
- Papyeong Yun clan: Yangban clan of Joseon

== See also ==
- Cheonmin
- Seonbi
- History of Korea
- Korean Confucianism
- Syngman Rhee
- Park Chung Hee
