= Nobi =

Korean slave class

- Hangul: 노비
- Hanja: 奴婢
- RR: nobi
- MR: nobi

Joseon class system
Class	Hangul	Hanja	Status
Yangban	양반	兩班	aristocratic class
Chungin	중인	中人	middle class
Sangmin	상민	常民	common people
Ch'ŏnmin	천민	賤民	lowborn people (nobi, paekchŏng, mudang, kisaeng, namsadang, etc.)

Nobi were members of the slave class during the Korean dynasties of Goryeo and Joseon. Legally, they held the lowest rank in medieval Korean society. Nobi were sometimes considered property or chattel, and could be bought, sold, or gifted. Nobi constituted more than 30% of the population at its peak in the middle of the Joseon dynasty.

== Classification and status ==
Nobi were divided into two categories: kongnobi (state-owned slaves) and sanobi (privately owned slaves). The general path for one to become a nobi was through heredity. The children of a mixed-status marriage between commoners and nobi usually inherited the status of the inferior social class. Non-resident nobi were registered officially as independent family units and possessed their own houses, families, land, and fortunes. However, nobi were not allowed to bequeath their property, and their property reverted to their owners upon death. They were allowed to own property, but did not have the rights to it.

Household nobi served as personal retainers and domestic servants, and most received a monthly salary that could be supplemented by earnings gained outside regular working hours. Non-resident nobi resided at a distance and were little different than tenant farmers or commoners. Non-resident nobi were far more numerous than household nobi.

The nobi were socially indistinct from freemen other than the ruling yangban class, and some possessed property rights, legal entities, and civil rights. Hence, some scholars argue that it is inappropriate to call them "slaves", while some scholars describe them as serfs. Furthermore, the Korean word for an actual slave, in the European and American meaning, is noye, not nobi. Some nobi owned their own nobi.

Some people became nobi as legal punishment for committing a crime or failing to pay a debt. However, some voluntarily became nobi in order to escape crushing poverty during poor harvests and famines. Few commoners also desired to be released from taxation and military service by becoming nobi. This phenomenon was prominent, especially in the late 18th century, when Joseon was suffering from severe poverty.

Nobi status was rationalized with the justification that nobi had a “moral stain” attached to them, often with the idea that nobi were "descendants of criminals”. This was to justify their status in society and maintain the stability of the social hierarchy in Joseon. Nobi were part of a “rigid, hierarchical social order” that justified their treatment and bound them to the lowest rank of society.

== Treatment and discrimination ==
Views of nobi by their owners were mostly negative. Most nobi did not have surnames, which was a great stigma in the Joseon society. Some nobi had given names that degraded one, such as names symbolizing dogs, pigs, or excrement. The names were usually of two characters, and more of a nickname than a real name.

Nobi were severely punished when they were caught trying to flee. According to the law, the owners were not held responsible even if the nobi died during the harsh beating.

Meanwhile, the owner’s status as the legal father of the nobi made him responsible for the care of the nobi. The hierarchical relationship between the yangban master and nobi was believed to be equivalent to the Confucian hierarchical relationship between ruler and subject, or father and son. Nobi were considered an extension of the master's own body, and an ideology based on patronage and mutual obligation developed. Nobi were regarded as the yangban’s sujok(hands and feet), and the yangban family depended on the nobi for their daily lives. During the Imjin War (1592_1597), sanobi performed important and dangerous tasks, such as searching for their owner’s separated family members or carrying news about the war to their master.

Nobi were legally the property of the owners, but were also included in the Confucian ideology of family morals and filial piety. They were expected to show loyalty to their birth parents. The Annals of King Taejong stated: "The nobi is also a human being like us; therefore, it is reasonable to treat him generously" and "In our country, we love our nobis like a part of our body." The owners were expected to feed and clothe their nobi properly, and even expected to bear legal responsibility for a nobi’s death if the nobi committed suicide.

In the chakkae system, nobi were assigned two pieces of agricultural land, with the resulting produce from the first land paid to the master, and the produce from the second land kept by the nobi to consume or sell. In order to gain freedom, nobi could purchase it, earn it through military service, or receive it as a favor from the government.

In 1426, Sejong the Great enacted a law that granted kongnobi women 100 days of maternity leave after childbirth, which, in 1430, was lengthened by one month before childbirth. In 1434, Sejong also granted the husbands 30 days of paternity leave.

== Social and economic significance ==
Nobi occupied an ambiguous position between property and humans. They were the subject of inheritance and trade, but at the same time, they were guaranteed some property and rights, much like the commoners. This is because nobi were of the same ethnicity as their owners. Nobi were not created through the invasion of other ethnic groups, but were made internally in Joseon society, as it was mostly criminals who became nobi. Though nobi did not have the freedom of status, in reality, they were not just powerless individuals, but also engaged in economic activities and had social roles.
