= Sangmin =

Korean commoner caste

- Hangul: 상민
- Hanja: 常民
- RR: sangmin
- MR: sangmin

Sangmin (Korean: 상민; Hanja: 常民), short for p'yŏngsangjimin (평상지민; 平常之民), is a Korean-language term for commoners of the Joseon period (1392–1897).

Synonyms for the term include sŏin (서인; 庶人), sangin (상인; 常人), yangmin (양민; 良民), p'yŏngmin (평민; 平民), and p'yŏngin (평인; 平人). Sangmin was also sometimes used to describe innocent people, in contrast to criminals.

== History ==
The term sangmin was used as an informal or legal designation depending on the time period. It refers to everyone who is not of noble background. In the latter half of the 17th century, a two-class system called yangch'ŏnje (양천제; 良賤制) was enacted, and sangmin made the lower class. However, sangmin were still de facto divided into various subgroups.

Sangmin were systemically disadvantaged. While they were technically supposed to receive equal access to education and the taking of the gwageo (civil service examinations), the nobility used their influence to place restrictions on such access.

There was a range in economic conditions for sangmin; it was reportedly sometimes difficult to distinguish between a well-off sangmin and a nobleperson. Money allowed for the purchase of clothing that signaled high social status.

== See also ==
- Yangban
- Chungin
- Cheonmin
- Baekjeong
- Nobi
