= Queen Insun =

Queen of Joseon from 1545 to 1567

Regent of Joseon
- Tenure: 12 August 1567 – 22 March 1568
- Monarch: King Seonjo

Queen Dowager of Joseon
- Tenure: 12 August 1567 – 22 February 1575
- Predecessor: Queen Dowager Gongui
- Successor: Queen Dowager Soseong
- With: Queen Dowager Gongui

Queen Consort of Joseon
- Tenure: 17 August 1545 – 12 August 1567
- Predecessor: Queen Inseong
- Successor: Queen Uiin
- Born: 7 July 1532; Hanseong, Joseon
- Died: 22 February 1575 (aged 42); Tongmyeongjeon, Changgyeonggung, Hanseong, Joseon
- Burial: Gangneung, Seoul, South Korea
- Spouse: King Myeongjong (m. 1543; died 1567)
- Issue Detail: 2 sons (1 adopted son)
Regnal name
- Uiseong (의성; 懿聖) (Note: Known as honorific name (존호; 尊號) in the Sinosphere, its closest equivalent in the English-speaking world is the regnal name.)
Posthumous name
- Queen Seonyeol Insun (선열인순왕후; 宣烈仁順王后)
- Clan: Cheongsong Shim (by birth); Jeonju Yi (by marriage)
- Dynasty: Yi
- Father: Shim Kang, Internal Prince Cheongneung
- Mother: Internal Princess Consort Wansan, of the Jeonju Yi clan

Korean name
- Hangul: 인순왕후
- Hanja: 仁順王后
- RR: Insun wanghu
- MR: Insun wanghu

Queen Insun (Korean: 인순왕후; Hanja: 仁順王后; 7 July 1532 – 22 February 1575), of the Cheongsong Shim clan, was the wife of King Myeongjong, the 13th monarch of Joseon. She was queen of Joseon from 1545 until her husband's death in 1567, and was then styled as Queen Dowager Uiseong during the reign of her adopted son, King Seonjo.

== Biography ==
=== Early life and lineage ===
The future Queen Insun was born during the reign of King Jungjong, as the eldest child among eight sons and three daughter. Her father was Shim Kang (심강) and her mother was a lady from the Jeonju Yi clan.

On her paternal side, Lady Shim was a member of the prestigious Cheongsong Shim clan and a direct descendant of Queen Soheon's father, Shim On, while on her maternal side, she was a 5th great-granddaughter of King Taejong and Queen Wongyeong via their second surviving son, Grand Prince Hyoryeong, as well as a 4th great-granddaughter of Taejong's elder brother, King Jeongjong, via his seventh daughter, Princess Incheon (인천옹주).

=== Marriage ===
In 1542, at the age of 9, Lady Shim was arranged to marry 7-year-old Yi Hwan (then known as Grand Prince Gyeongwon), the only son of King Jungjong and Queen Munjeong. The wedding was held early the following year.

=== As queen ===
In 1545, when his elder half-brother, King Injong died without issue, Yi Hwan ( posthumously King Myeongjong) acceded to the throne, and Lady Shim thus became queen.

During the last years of King Myeongjong's reign, Lady Shim's younger brother, Shim Ui-gyeom, played a major role in the ousting of their maternal uncle, Yi Ryang, and their rivalry represents a defining moment of the clash between the corrupt royal in-laws and the rising Sarim scholars. However, this victory inadvertently set the stage for the famous nationwide split of the Sarim into the Easterners (Dongin) and Westerners (Seoin).

In 1551, Lady Shim had given birth to her husband's only son, Yi Bu, but the child died prematurely in 1563. As the country was now without an heir, Prince Deokheung's youngest son, Yi Gyun, was eventually adopted under the royal couple's name.

=== Later life and death ===
After King Myeongjong's death in 1567, the throne passed to Yi Gyun, now named Yi Yeon (posthumously King Seonjo). Lady Shim became queen dowager and received the honorific name Uiseong (의성; lit. ''exemplary and sacred''). She also served as regent initially, but stepped down after several months.

Lady Shim died seven years later, at the age of 42. She was buried alongside King Myeongjong within Gangneung (강릉), today part of the Taegangneung burial ground in Nowon District, Seoul.

== Titles ==
- During the reign of King Jungjong (r. 1506–1544):
  - Lady, of the Cheongsong Shim clan (청송 심씨; 靑松沈氏; from 7 July 1532)
    - Shim Kang's daughter (심강의 딸)
    - Lady Shim (심씨; 沈氏)
  - Princess Consort (군부인; 郡夫人; from 4 January 1453)
- During the reign of King Myeongjong (r. 1545–1567):
  - Queen (왕비; 王妃; from 17 August 1545)
- During the reign of King Seonjo (r. 1567–1608):
  - Queen Dowager Uiseong (의성왕대비; 懿聖王大妃; from 12 August 1567)
  - Queen Insun (인순왕후; 仁順王后; from 1575)

== Family ==
- Father: Shim Kang (심강), Internal Prince Cheongneung (청릉부원군; 1514–1567)
- Mother: Internal Princess Consort Wansan (완산부부인), of the Jeonju Yi clan (전주 이씨; 1511–1559); given name Hui-gyeong (희경)
- Sibling(s)
  - Shim In-gyeom (심인겸; 1533–?) (Note: ▪︎Wife: Lady, of the Jeonju Yi clan (전주 이씨); daughter of Yi Bal (이발). ▪︎Issue: 1 adopted son.)
  - Shim Ui-gyeom (심의겸; 1535–1587)
  - Shim Ye-gyeom (심예겸; 1537–?) (Note: ▪︎Wife: Lady, of the Yeonil Jeong clan (연일 정씨); daughter of Jeong Suk (정숙). ▪︎Issue: 1 adopted son.)
  - Shim Ji-gyeom (심지겸; 1540–1568) (Note: ▪︎1st wife: Lady, of the Haman Yi clan (함안 이씨); daughter of Yi Je (이제). ▪︎2nd wife: Lady, of the Yangcheon Heo clan (양천 허씨); daughter of Heo Tak (허탁). ▪︎Issue: 1 son.)
  - Shim Sin-gyeom (심신겸; 1542–1596) (Note: ▪︎Wife: Lady, of the Dongnae Jeong clan (동래 정씨); daughter of Jeong In-su (정인수). ▪︎Issue: 3 sons, 4 daughters.)
  - Shim Chung-gyeom (심충겸; 1545–1594) (Note: ▪︎Wife: Lady, of the Jeonju Yi clan (전주 이씨; 1545–?), given name Gae (개); daughter of Prince Bongseong (봉성군; 1528–1547) and granddaughter of King Jungjong. ▪︎Issue: 3 sons, 2 daughters; among his descendants is Queen Danui.)
  - Shim Hyo-gyeom (심효겸; 1547–?) (Note: ▪︎1st wife: Lady, of the Uiryeong Nam clan (의령 남씨); daughter of Nam Eung-seo (남응서). ▪︎2nd wife: Lady, of the Goseong Yi clan (고성 이씨); daughter of Yi Jeong (이정). ▪︎Issue: 2 sons, 2 daughters.)
  - Shim Je-gyeom (심제겸; 1550–?) (Note: ▪︎Wife: Lady, of the Geochang Shin clan (거창 신씨); daughter of Shin Sa-won (신사원; 1520–?) and grandniece of Queen Dangyeong. ▪︎Issue: 2 sons, 3 daughters.)
  - Lady, of the Cheongsong Shim clan (청송 심씨); given name Sul-jeong (술정) (Note: Married Im Yeong-ro (임영로; 1540–1593) from the Pungcheon Im clan (풍천 임씨). They had issue (2 sons).)
  - Lady, of the Cheongsong Shim clan (청송 심씨) (Note: Married Yi Byeok (이벽), Chugye Su (추계수); son of Prince Suwon (수원군). The royal lineage is unclear.)
- Husband: King Myeongjong (명종대왕; 13 July 1534 – 12 August 1567)
  - Father-in-law: King Jungjong (중종대왕; 25 April 1488 – 9 December 1544)
  - Mother-in-law: Queen Munjeong (문정왕후), of the Papyeong Yun clan (파평 윤씨; 12 December 1501 – 15 May 1565)
- Issue
  - Yi Bu (이부), Crown Prince Sunhoe (순회세자; 11 July 1551 – 16 October 1563)
  - Yi Yeon (이연), King Seonjo (선조대왕; 6 December 1552 – 16 March 1608) — Adopted.

== Ancestry ==
Ancestors of Queen Insun

Shim Won (심원)
Shim Sun-mun (심순문)
Lady, of the Jeonju Yi clan (전주 이씨)
Shim Yeon-won (심연원)
Shin Yeong-seok (신영석)
Lady, of the Pyongsan Shin clan (평산 신씨)
Lady, of the Yangcheon Heo clan (양천 허씨)
Shim Kang, Internal Prince Cheongneung (청릉부원군 심강)
Kim Tae-gyeong (김태경)
Kim Dang (김당)
Lady, of the Chogye Byeon clan (초계 변씨)
Lady, of the Gyeongju Kim clan (경주 김씨)
Queen Insun
Prince Yulwon (율원군)
Prince Yeoyang (여양군)
Princess Consort Muan, of the Dongnae Jeong clan (무안현부인 동래 정씨)
Prince Jeonseong (전성군)
Kim Gi (김기)
Lady, of the Gwangsan Kim clan (광산 김씨)
Lady, of the Jeonui Yi clan (전의 이씨)
Internal Princess Consort Wansan, of the Jeonju Yi clan (완산부부인 전주 이씨)
Jeong Gwal (정괄)
Jeong Jong-bo (정종보)
Lady, of the Yangseong Yi clan (양성 이씨)
Lady, of the Dongnae Jeong clan (동래 정씨)

== In popular culture ==
- Portrayed by Kang Sok-ran in the 1985 MBC TV series 500 Years of Joseon: The Wind Orchid.
- Portrayed by Park Yun-seon in the 2001–2002 SBS TV series Ladies of the Palace.
- Portrayed by Lee Kan-hee in the 2004–2005 KBS1 TV series Immortal Admiral Yi Sun-sin.
- Portrayed by Ahn Yeo-jin in the 2014–2015 KBS2 TV series The King's Face.
- Portrayed by Jang Hee-jin in the 2016 JTBC TV series Secret Healer.

== See also ==
- Political factions of Joseon
- Consort kin
- History of Korea
- Styles and titles in Joseon

== Notes ==
Queen Insun Cheongsong Shim clan
Royal titles
Preceded by Queen Inseong of the Bannam Park clan	Queen Consort of Joseon; 1545–1567	Succeeded by Queen Uiin of the Bannam Park clan
Preceded by Queen Dowager Gongui of the Bannam Park clan	Queen Dowager of Joseon; 1567–1575 with Queen Dowager Gongui	Succeeded by Queen Dowager Soseong of the Yonan Kim clan
