= Deposed Queen Shin =

Queen of Joseon from 1495 to 1506

Queen Consort of Joseon
- Tenure: 29 January 1495 – 28 September 1506
- Investiture: 16 April 1497; Injeongjeon, Changdeokgung
- Predecessor: Queen Jeonghyeon
- Successor: Queen Dangyeong

Crown Princess of Joseon
- Tenure: 17 February 1488 – 29 January 1495
- Investiture: Injeongjeon, Changdeokgung
- Predecessor: Crown Princess Han
- Successor: Crown Princess Park
- Born: 24 December 1476; Joseon
- Died: 26 May 1537 (aged 60); Hanseong, Joseon
- Burial: Yeonsangunmyo, Seoul, South Korea
- Spouse: Yeonsangun (m. 1488; died 1506)
- Issue Detail: 5 sons, 3 daughters
Regnal name
- Jein Wondeok (제인원덕; 齊仁元德) (Note: Known as honorific name (존호; 尊號) in the Sinosphere, its closest equivalent in the English-speaking world is the regnal name.) (Note: From 1505 to 1506.)
- Clan: Geochang Shin (by birth); Jeonju Yi (by marriage)
- Dynasty: Yi
- Father: Shin Seung-seon, Internal Prince Geochang
- Mother: County Princess Jungmo

Korean name
- Hangul: 폐비 신씨
- Hanja: 廢妃 慎氏
- RR: Pyebi Sinssi
- MR: P'yebi Sinssi

Deposed Queen Shin (Korean: 폐비 신씨; Hanja: 廢妃 慎氏; 24 December 1476 – 26 May 1537), of the Geochang Shin clan, also known as Princess Consort Geochang, was the wife of Yeonsangun, the tyrannical 10th monarch of Joseon, and the paternal aunt of Queen Dangyeong. She was queen of Joseon from 1495 until her husband's dethronement in 1506.

== Biography ==
=== Early life and lineage ===
Lady Shin was born during the reign of King Seongjong, as the fourth daughter among three sons and five daughters. Her father was Shin Seung-seon (신승선), who would later become chief state councilor, and her mother was County Princess Jungmo (중모현주), the eldest daughter of Grand Prince Imyong. As a great-granddaughter of King Sejong, Lady Shin was a second cousin once removed of her future husband and her illustrious lineage made her one of the most highborn royal consorts throughout the Joseon period.

=== Marriage ===
In 1487, Lady Shin became engaged to Crown Prince Yung (later known as Yeonsangun/Prince Yeonsan), the eldest son of King Seongjong. They were married in early 1488 and Lady Shin became crown princess; she had just turned 12, while the crown prince was a few days older. This was the first case of an investiture without a selection process since Joseon was established almost a century earlier.

Lady Shin's first child, Princess Hwisin, was born in 1491, then a second daughter in 1492 or 1493, a short-lived son in 1494, and a third daughter in 1495.

After several months of illness, King Seongjong died on 29 January 1495 and the crown prince (henceforth called Yeonsangun) acceded to the throne. Lady Shin thus became queen.

=== As queen ===
Following the end of the mourning period for the late king, Lady Shin gave birth to her eldest surviving son, Yi Hwang, in 1498. Her second surviving son, Yi Seong, was born two years later, then another son, who would die in infancy, in 1501. Shin Seung-seon died in 1502 and Yeonsangun prevented the heavily pregnant Lady Shin from mourning her father, likely out of fear that it would affect her health; this last pregnancy ultimately resulted in a stillborn son.

In 1499, Lady Shin's 12-year-old niece (the future Queen Dangyeong) was married to Grand Prince Jinseong, Yeonsangun's half-brother and the only son of Queen Dowager Jasun.

Yeonsangun had grown up believing Queen Dowager Jasun to be his biological mother, and only discovered he was the son of the Deposed Queen Yun after reading King Seongjong's epitaph. This revelation is thought to have caused his descent into madness. In 1504, he unleashed the Second Literati Purge, punishing and executing anyone he considered to have contributed to his mother's downfall, while at the same time cleansing the court of dissidents. During this period, Yeonsangun stood outside Queen Dowager Jasun's chambers with a long sword in hand, ordering her to come out. It was Lady Shin who intervened to dissuade him and calm the situation.

Lady Shin often remonstrated against her husband's dissolute and immoral behavior, and although he ignored her pleas, Yeonsangun did not become estranged from her. On the contrary, he praised Lady Shin's conduct, while her relatives were promoted and shielded from crime. In 1505, he also bestowed upon her the honorific title Jein Wondeok (제인원덕; 齊仁元德; lit. ''uniform benevolence, primary virtue'').

=== Husband's dethronement and aftermath ===
In 1506, a coup d'état orchestrated by Park Won-jong, Seong Hui-an, Ryu Sun-jong and Hong Gyeong-ju (홍경주) put Grand Prince Jinseong (posthumously King Jungjong) on the throne.

Yeonsangun was demoted to princely rank and exiled, subsequently dying two months later. His last words were allegedly, "I miss my wife, Lady Shin" (아내 신씨가 보고 싶다). Lady Shin lost her position as queen and her request to be exiled alongside Yeonsangun was refused; instead, she was sent to her parents' residence. Her two sons were sentenced to death shortly after arriving at their place of exile and her three elder brothers were executed. Her niece, who was married to King Jungjong, became the new queen only to be deposed after one week.

=== Later life and death ===
In 1512, Lady Shin successfully petitioned for the relocation of Yeonsangun's tomb from Ganghwa to its current site. In 1521, when her house collapsed due to heavy rain, King Jungjong granted her the confiscated residence of An Cheo-gyeom (안처겸).

Lady Shin died at the age of 60, having survived her husband by 30 years. She was buried alongside him within Yeonsangunmyo (연산군묘), in present-day Dobong District, Seoul. The tombs of their daughter, Princess Hwisin, and son-in-law, Gu Mun-gyeong (구문경), are also located in the grounds.

The memorial rites for Lady Shin and Yeonsangun were performed by Princess Hwisin's son, Gu Eom (구엄), and upon Gu Eom's death, the duty was assumed by his only legitimate daughter's adoptive son, Yi An-nul (이안눌).

=== Evaluation ===
According to the Veritable Records of the Joseon Dynasty, Lady Shin was peaceful, dignified, gentle and discreet. She was regarded as a virtuous wife and wise mother, and since her time as crown princess, she was respectful to superiors and benevolent to subordinates. Furthermore, she was one of the few people who gave frank advice to Yeonsangun.

== Titles ==
- During the reign of King Seongjong (r. 1470–1495):
  - Lady, of the Geochang Shin clan (거창 신씨; 居昌愼氏; from 24 December 1476)
    - Shin Seung-seon's daughter (신승선의 딸)
    - Lady Shin (신씨; 愼氏)
  - Crown Princess (왕세제빈; 王世弟嬪; from 17 February 1488)
- During the reign of Yeonsangun (r. 1495–1506):
  - Queen (왕비; 王妃; from 29 January 1495)
- During the reign of King Jungjong (r. 1506–1544):
  - Princess Consort Geochang (거창군부인; 居昌郡夫人; from 1506)

== Family ==
- Father: Shin Seung-seon (신승선), Internal Prince Geochang (거창부원군; 1436 – 13 July 1502)
- Mother: County Princess Jungmo (중모현주; 1435–?)
- Sibling(s)
  - Shin Su-geun (신수근), Internal Prince Ikchang (익창부원군; 1450–1506) (Note: ▪︎1st wife: Internal Princess Consort Yeongga (영가부부인), of the Andong Gwon clan (안동 권씨); sixth daughter of Gwon Ram. ▪︎2nd wife: Internal Princess Consort Cheongwon (청원부부인), of the Cheongju Han clan (청주 한씨; 1447–?); daughter of Han Chung-in (한충인; 1433–1504), grandniece of Deposed Crown Princess Kim, first cousin of Han Hwak and great-great-granddaughter of King Taejong. ▪︎Issue: 4 sons, 3 daughters; including Queen Dangyeong. [Lineage: King Taejong → Princess Gyeongjeong (경정공주; 1387–1455) → Lady, of the Pyongyang Jo clan (평양 조씨) → Lady, of the (old) Andong Kim clan (구 안동 김씨) → Internal Princess Consort Cheongwon])
  - Shin Su-gyeom (신수겸; 1453–1506) (Note: ▪︎1st wife: Lady, of the Jinju Kang clan (진주 강씨); daughter of Kang Ja-pyeong (강자평; 1430–1486). ▪︎2nd wife: Lady, of the Damyang Jeon clan (담양 전씨). ▪︎Issue: 1 son, 1 daughter; among his descendants is Queen Inheon (great-great-granddaughter).)
  - Shin Su-yeong (신수영; 1461–1506) (Note: ▪︎Wife: Lady, of the Cheongju Han clan (청주 한씨); fifth daughter of Han Baek-ryun (한백륜), Internal Prince Cheongcheon (청천부원군; 1427–1474) and younger sister of Queen Ansun. ▪︎Issue: 2 sons.)
  - Lady, of the Geochang Shin clan (거창 신씨; 1466–?) (Note: Married Yi Hyeong (이형), Seungpyeong Bujeong (승평부정; 1479–?); eldest son of Prince Hoewon (회원군; 1464–1493). [Biological lineage: King Sejong → Grand Prince Gwangpyeong (광평대군; 1425–1445) → Prince Yeongsun (영순군; 1444–1470) → Prince Hoewon → Seungpyeong Bujeong; Adoptive lineage: King Sejong → Grand Prince Imyong → Prince Gwiseong (귀성군; 1441–1479) → Prince Hoewon → Seungpyeong Bujeong])
  - Lady, of the Geochang Shin clan (거창 신씨; 1467–?) (Note: Married Nam Gyeong (남경) from the Uiryeong Nam clan (의령 남씨); grandnephew of Queen Soheon and uncle of Gwiin Nam (귀인 남씨; consort of King Seongjong). They had issue (4 sons, 1 daughter).)
  - Lady, of the Geochang Shin clan (거창 신씨; 1469–?) (Note: Married An Hwan (안환) from the Sunheung An clan (순흥 안씨); adopted son of County Princess Cheongha (청하현주; 1448–?), a younger sister of County Princess Jungmo.)
  - Lady, of the Geochang Shin clan (거창 신씨) (Note: Married Ryu Yun-beom (류윤범) from the Jeonju Ryu clan (전주 류씨).)
- Husband: Yeonsangun (연산군; 2 December 1476 – 30 November 1506)
  - Father-in-law: King Seongjong (성종대왕; 28 August 1457 – 29 January 1495)
  - Biological mother-in-law: Deposed Queen (폐비), of the Haman Yun clan (함안 윤씨; 24 July 1455 – 7 September 1482)
  - Adoptive mother-in-law: Queen Jeonghyeon (정현왕후), of the Papyeong Yun clan (파평 윤씨; 30 July 1462 – 23 September 1530)
- Issue
  - Princess Hwisin (휘신공주; 2 November 1491 – 1524); given name Su-eok (수억)
  - Unnamed daughter (c. 1492–?)
  - Unnamed son (1494)
  - Unnamed daughter (1495–?)
  - Yi Hwang (이황), Crown Prince (왕세자; 19 January 1498 – 20 October 1506)
  - Yi Seong (이성), Grand Prince Changnyeong (창녕대군; 18 June 1500 – 20 October 1506)
  - Unnamed son (1501–1503) (Note: His childhood name was In-su (인수).)
  - Unnamed son (1502)

== Ancestry ==
Ancestors of Deposed Queen Shin

Shin In-do (신인도)
Shin I-chung (신이충)
Shin Jeon (신전)
Lady, of the Sunchang Seol clan (순창 설씨)
Shin Seung-seon, Internal Prince Geochang (거창부원군 신승선)
An Jo-dong (안조동)
An Gang (안강)
Lady, of the Sunheung An clan (순흥 안씨)
Lady, of the Hanyang Jo clan (한양 조씨)
Deposed Queen Shin
King Taejong (태종대왕)
King Sejong (세종대왕)
Queen Wongyeong, of the Yeoheung Min clan (원경왕후 여흥 민씨)
Grand Prince Imyong (임영대군)
Shim On, Internal Prince Cheongcheon (청천부원군 심온)
Queen Soheon, of the Cheongsong Shim clan (소헌왕후 청송 심씨)
Grand Princess Consort of Samhan State, of the Sunheung An clan (삼한국대부인 순흥 안씨)
County Princess Jungmo (중모현주)
Choe Sa-gang (최사강)
Choe Seung-nyeong (최승녕)
Lady, of the Yangseong Yi clan (양성 이씨)
Grand Princess Consort Jean, of the Jeonju Choe clan (제안부부인 전주 최씨)
Shin Hyo-chang (신효창)
Lady, of the Pyongsan Shin clan (평산 신씨)

== In popular culture ==
- Portrayed by Choi Eun-hee in the 1961 film Prince Yeonsan and the 1962 sequel Tyrant Yeonsan.
- Portrayed by Han Ae-kyung in the 1984–1985 MBC TV series 500 Years of Joseon: The Ume Tree in the Midst of the Snow.
- Portrayed by Kwon Jae-hee in the 1988 film Diary of King Yeonsan.
- Portrayed by Lee Eun-kyung in the 1994 KBS2 TV series Han Myung Hoe.
- Portrayed by Choi Seon-ah in the 1995 KBS2 TV series Jang Nok Soo.
- Portrayed by Lee Si-nae in the 1998–2000 KBS1 TV series The King and the Queen.
- Portrayed by Park Ha-sun in the 2007–2008 SBS TV series The King and I.
- Portrayed by Hong Soo-hee in the 2011–2012 JTBC TV series Insu, the Queen Mother.
- Portrayed by Song Ji-in in the 2017 KBS2 TV series Queen for Seven Days.
- Inspired a fictional queen portrayed by Kim Ji-soo in the 2026 KBS2 TV series To My Beloved Thief.

== See also ==
- History of Korea
- Consort kin
- Jungjong Restoration
- Styles and titles in Joseon
- Political factions of Joseon

== Notes ==
Deposed Queen Shin Geochang Shin clan
Royal titles
Preceded by Queen Jeonghyeon of the Papyeong Yun clan	Queen Consort of Joseon; 1495–1506	Succeeded by Queen Dangyeong of the Geochang Shin clan
