= Queen Dangyeong =

Queen of Joseon in 1506

Queen Consort of Joseon
- Tenure: 28 September – 5 October 1506
- Predecessor: Queen Shin
- Successor: Queen Janggyeong
- Born: 16 February 1487; Joseon
- Died: 6 January 1558 (aged 70); Hanseong, Joseon
- Burial: Olleung, Yangju, South Korea
- Spouse: King Jungjong (m. 1499–1506)
Posthumous name
- Queen Gongso Sunyeol Dangyeong (공소순열단경왕후; 恭昭順烈端敬王后)
- Clan: Geochang Shin (by birth); Jeonju Yi (by marriage)
- Dynasty: Yi
- Father: Shin Su-geun, Internal Prince Ikchang
- Mother: Internal Princess Consort Cheongwon, of the Cheongju Han clan

Korean name
- Hangul: 단경왕후
- Hanja: 端敬王后
- RR: Dangyeong wanghu
- MR: Tan'gyŏng wanghu

Queen Dangyeong (Korean: 단경왕후; Hanja: 端敬王后; 16 February 1487 – 6 January 1558), of the Geochang Shin clan, was the first wife of King Jungjong, the 11th monarch of Joseon. She was briefly queen of Joseon in 1506, from her husband's accession to the throne until her own deposition seven days later. She was then known as Deposed Queen Shin.

== Biography ==
=== Early life and lineage ===
The future Queen Dangyeong was born during the reign of King Seongjong, as the second daughter among four sons and three daughters. Her father was Shin Su-geun (신수근), who would later become left state councilor, and her mother was his second wife, a lady from the prestigious Cheongju Han clan.

Like her paternal aunt (later known as Deposed Queen Shin), who had married the infamous Yeonsangun, Lady Shin was one of the most highborn royal consorts throughout the Joseon period; she descended from kings via both of her grandmothers — being a great-great-granddaughter of King Sejong and Queen Soheon, and a great-great-great-granddaughter of King Taejong and Queen Wongyeong, respectively — whereas her grandfathers came from powerful aristocratic clans. Her maternal family, in particular, was a pillar of the Hungu faction, which had dominated the royal court since King Sejo's accession to the throne in 1455. Notably, Lady Shin was a first cousin once removed of Consort Kanghuizhuangshuli and Madame Gongshen (공신부인; consort of the Xuande Emperor), a first cousin twice removed of Queen Insu, a fourth cousin once removed of Queen Ansun, a fifth cousin of the kingmaker Han Myeong-hoe, and a fifth cousin once removed of his daughters, Queen Jangsun and Queen Gonghye.

=== Marriage ===
In 1499, at the age of 12, Lady Shin married 11-year-old Grand Prince Jinseong, the only son born to the late King Seongjong and Queen Dowager Jasun, and a younger half-brother of Yeonsangun. Through her paternal aunt's marriage, Yeonsangun was Lady Shin's uncle-in-law and through her own marriage, a brother-in-law.

=== Downfall ===
In 1506, Yeonsangun was dethroned in a coup d'état orchestrated by Park Won-jong, Seong Hui-an, Ryu Sun-jong and Hong Gyeong-ju (홍경주). On the same day, soldiers belonging to the coup leaders surrounded Grand Prince Jinseong's residence, and the prince, assuming they had come to kill him at Yeonsangun's order, prepared to commit suicide; it was Lady Shin who dissuaded him. Grand Prince Jinseong (posthumously King Jungjong) then took the throne, and Lady Shin thus became queen. However, because her father, as Yeonsangun's brother-in-law and Crown Prince Hwang's maternal uncle, had previously refused to participate in the coup d'état, the coup leaders forced Lady Shin's deposition just one week later.

On the other hand, a considerable number of historians argue that Lady Shin never served as queen and was merely staying in Gyeongbokgung in her capacity as King Jungjong's legitimate wife, since she hadn't underwent an investiture ceremony or even received an investiture edict. Therefore, the period of seven days between Jungjong's enthronement and Lady Shin's so-called deposition should be viewed simply as the time Jungjong withstood the pressure to cast out his wife.

=== Later life and death ===
After the death of Jungjong's second wife, Queen Janggyeong, in 1515, petitions in support of Lady Shin's reinstatement were submitted, but these efforts were thwarted and the officials were sent into exile. By this time, the powerful coup leaders who had advocated for Lady Shin's deposition were all dead and her reinstatement was theoretically possible provided that Jungjong had the will. In practice, Queen Janggyeong had already given birth to a son, so if Lady Shin returned to the palace and had a son of her own, it would become a major issue that could sow the seeds of a future succession crisis: between the son born to the first wife and the son born to the second wife, which one should be considered King Jungjong's legitimate eldest son.

According to unofficial histories, although Jungjong was forced to divorce Lady Shin and was later unable to reinstate her due to the issue of succession, he missed her deeply and often gazed in the direction of her private residence. Upon hearing this, Lady Shin hung her red skirt on a rock face of Inwangsan so that Jungjong could see her enduring love and longing.

In 1544, shortly before his death, rumors circulated that Jungjong had brought Lady Shin into the palace. The following year, King Injong began providing Lady Shin with support, which continued during the reign of King Myeongjong.

Lady Shin died at the age of 70, having survived her former husband by 13 years; it was 51 years since her deposition. She was buried in present-day Yangju, Gyeonggi Province and her funeral was held according to the protocols for the parents of a queen.

In 1739, during the reign of King Yeongjo, she received the posthumous name Dangyeong (단경; lit. ''upright and respectful'') and her tomb was renamed Olleung (온릉).

== Titles ==
- During the reign of King Seongjong (r. 1470–1495):
  - Lady, of the Geochang Shin clan (거창 신씨; 居昌愼氏; from 16 February 1487)
    - Shin Su-geun's daughter (신수근의 딸)
    - Lady Shin (신씨; 愼氏)
- During the reign of Yeonsangun (r. 1495–1506):
  - Grand Princess Consort (부부인; 府夫人; from 1499)
- During the reign of King Jungjong (r. 1506–1544):
  - Queen (왕비; 王妃; from 28 September 1506)
  - Commoner (서인; 庶人; from 5 October 1506)
- During the reign of King Yeongjo (r. 1724–1776):
  - Queen Dangyeong (단경왕후; 端敬王后; from 1739)

== Family ==
- Father: Shin Su-geun (신수근), Internal Prince Ikchang (익창부원군; 1450–1506)
- Stepmother: Internal Princess Consort Yeongga (영가부부인), of the Andong Gwon clan (안동 권씨) (Note: Shin Su-geun's first wife; sixth daughter of Gwon Ram.)
- Mother: Internal Princess Consort Cheongwon (청원부부인), of the Cheongju Han clan (청주 한씨; 1447–?); given name Eun-gwang (은광)
- Sibling(s)
  - Lady, of the Geochang Shin clan (거창 신씨) (Note: Married Shin Gong-seop (신공섭) from the Goryeong Shin clan (고령 신씨); grandnephew of Shin Suk-ju.)
  - Shin Hong-bo (신홍보)
  - Shin Hong-pil (신홍필; 1487–?) (Note: ▪︎Wife: Lady, of the Pyongyang Jo clan (평양 조씨). ▪︎Wife: Lady, of the Namyang Hong clan (남양 홍씨); daughter of Hong Baek-gyeong (홍백경), granddaughter of Princess Myeongsuk and grandniece of Concubine Suk. ▪︎Issue: 2 sons, 1 daughter.)
  - Lady, of the Geochang Shin clan (거창 신씨; 1489–?) (Note: Married Jo Se-chung (조세충) from the Pyongyang Jo clan (평양 조씨); great-great-grandson of King Taejong. [Lineage: King Taejong → Princess Gyeongjeong (경정공주; 1387–1455) → Jo Mu-yeong (조무영) → Jo Gyeong (조경) → Jo Se-chung])
  - Shin Hong-jo (신홍조; 1490–?) (Note: ▪︎Wife: Lady, of the Pungcheon Im clan (풍천 임씨); daughter of Im Hui-jae (임희재; 1472–1504), granddaughter of Im Sa-hong and great-great-granddaughter of King Sejong. ▪︎Issue: 2 sons, 2 daughters. [Lineage: King Sejong → Grand Prince Yeongeung (영응대군; 1434–1467) → County Princess Gilan (길안현주; 1457–1519) → Lady, of the Neungseong Gu clan (능성 구씨) → Lady Im])
  - Shin Hong-u (신홍우)
- Husband: King Jungjong (중종대왕; 25 April 1488 – 9 December 1544) — No issue.
  - Father-in-law: King Seongjong (성종대왕; 28 August 1457 – 29 January 1495)
  - Mother-in-law: Queen Jeonghyeon (정현왕후), of the Papyeong Yun clan (파평 윤씨; 30 July 1462 – 23 September 1530)

== Ancestry ==
Ancestors of Queen Dangyeong

Shin I-chung (신이충)
Shin Jeon (신전)
Lady, of the Sunchang Seol clan (순창 설씨)
Shin Seung-seon, Internal Prince Geochang (거창부원군 신승선)
An Gang (안강)
Lady, of the Sunheung An clan (순흥 안씨)
Lady, of the Hanyang Jo clan (한양 조씨)
Shin Su-geun, Internal Prince Ikchang (익창부원군 신수근)
King Sejong (세종대왕)
Grand Prince Imyong (임영대군)
Queen Soheon, of the Cheongsong Shim clan (소헌왕후 청송 심씨)
County Princess Jungmo (중모현주)
Choe Seung-nyeong (최승녕)
Grand Princess Consort Jean, of the Jeonju Choe clan (제안부부인 전주 최씨)
Lady, of the Pyongsan Shin clan (평산 신씨)
Queen Dangyeong
Han Yeong-jeong (한영정)
Han Jeon (한전)
Lady, of the Uiseong Kim clan (의성 김씨)
Han Chung-in (한충인)
Shin Ri (신리)
Lady, of the Pyongsan Shin clan (평산 신씨)
Internal Princess Consort Cheongwon, of the Cheongju Han clan (청원부부인 청주 한씨)
Kim O-mun (김오문)
Kim Jung-eom (김중엄)
Lady, of the Hadong Jeong clan (하동 정씨)
Lady, of the (old) Andong Kim clan (구 안동 김씨)
Jo Dae-rim (조대림)
Lady, of the Pyongyang Jo clan (평양 조씨)
Princess Gyeongjeong (경정공주)

== In popular culture ==
- Portrayed by Lee Eun-kyung in the 1985 MBC TV series 500 Years of Joseon: The Wind Orchid.
- Portrayed by Kim Hye-ri in the 1996 KBS2 TV series Jo Gwang Jo.
- Portrayed by Kim Hee-jung in the 2001–2002 SBS TV series Ladies of the Palace.
- Portrayed by Yoon Seok-hwa in the 2017 SBS TV series Saimdang, Memoir of Colors.
- Portrayed by Park Si-eun and Park Min-young in the 2017 KBS2 TV series Queen for Seven Days.
- Inspired a fictional queen portrayed by Woo Mi-hwa in the 2022 KBS2 TV series Bloody Heart.

== See also ==
- Jungjong Restoration
- Consort kin
- Styles and titles in Joseon

== Notes ==
Queen Dangyeong Geochang Shin clan
Royal titles
Preceded by Queen Shin of the Geochang Shin clan	Queen Consort of Joseon; 1506	Succeeded by Queen Janggyeong of the Papyeong Yun clan
