= Princess Hwisin =

Korean princess (fl. 16th century)

Princess Hwisin 휘신공주
- Born: 24 October 1491; Joseon
- Died: c. 1524 (aged 33); Joseon
- Spouse: Gu Mun-gyeong, Lord Neungyang (m.1510–1524)
- Issue: Gu Eom; Gu Ham; Gu Dam
- House: Jeonju Yi (by birth) Neungseong Gu (by marriage)
- Father: Yeonsangun of Joseon
- Mother: Queen Shin

- Princess Hwisin
- Hangul: 이수억
- Hanja: 李壽億
- RR: I Sueok
- MR: I Suŏk

Royal title
- Hangul: 휘신공주
- Hanja: 徽愼公主
- RR: Hwisin gongju
- MR: Hwisin kongju

Princess Hwisin (Korean: 휘신공주; Hanja: 徽愼公主; 24 October 1491 (Note: In Korean lunar calendar, the princess was born on 22 September 1491) – ?), or firstly honoured as Princess Hwisun (휘순공주; 徽順公主), was a Joseon Royal Princess and the eldest daughter of Yeonsangun of Joseon and Deposed Queen Sin.

Her title as Princess was abolished after her father's abdication and was titled as Gu Mun-gyeong’s wife (구문경의 처), Lady Yi (이씨), or Lady Gu (구씨) to follow her husband's clan, the Neungseong Gu clan.

== Biography ==
=== Early life ===
On 24 October 1491, the Princess was born when her father, Prince Yeonsan, and her mother, Princess Consort Geochang, were still the heir successor to the throne as Crown Prince and Crown Princess Consort. The Princess was eventually named Yi Su-eok (이수억; 李壽億).

Through her mother, the Princess was a cousin of Queen Dangyeong and was a cousin-in-law of Princess Gyeongsun; the daughter of King Seongjong. She eventually became the great-grandaunt of Queen Inheon through her brother-in-law, Gu Hui-Gyeong (구희경; 具希璟), and his wife, Lady Shin of the Geochang Shin clan (거창 신씨; 居昌 愼氏); who also happened to be her and Queen Dangyeong’s younger cousin.

Princess Hwisin was the only child within her siblings to have survived to adulthood.

=== Marriage ===
The Princess was arranged to marry with Gu Su-yeong's fourth son, Gu Mun-gyeong, in 1510 who was then given the title of Lord Neungyang or Prince Consort Neungyang (능양위). The couple had three sons named Gu Eom in 1512, Gu Ham in 1515, and Gu Dam in 1518. Gu Su-yeong was already the son-in-law of Grand Prince Yeongeung, the eighth son of Sejong of Joseon and Queen Soheon.

The Princess's maternal grandmother was Princess Jungmo, the first daughter of Grand Prince Imyeong with Grand Princess Consort Jean of the Jeonju Choi clan. The Princess's mother-in-law was Princess Gilan who was also the daughter of Grand Prince Yeongeung. Both Grand Prince Imyeong and Grand Prince Yeongeung were the sons of King Sejong and Queen Soheon and became her great-grandfathers. Princess Gilan was also a maternal cousin of Queen Jeongsun.

=== Yeonsangun’s Abdication ===
However, after the Princess's father’s abdication in 1506, Princess Hwisin’s younger brothers died by poisoning through the decision of the royal court despite the King’s objections.

Her home was also confiscated and divided among Park Won-Jong, Yu Soon-jeong, and Sung Hui-an. But 2 years later in 1508, with the opinions of Yun Sun (유순; 柳洵) and other officials, the new King, Jungjong of Joseon, reunited the Princess and her husband. The king later visited her and her family as well as giving back her house.

=== Death ===
When the Princess and her husband had already died, some of their direct descendants were slowly declining, and Yi Ahn-nul, the only adoptive grandson of their first son Gu Eom, became a civil servant and served the ancestral rites for his grandparents and great-grandparents.

== Family ==
- Father - Yeonsangun of Joseon (조선 연산군; 23 November 1476 – 20 November 1506)
  - Grandfather - King Seongjong of Joseon (조선 성종왕; 20 August 1457 – 20 January 1494)
  - Grandmother - Queen Jeheon of the Haman Yun clan (제헌왕후 윤씨; 15 July 1455 – 29 August 1482)
- Mother - Queen Jeinwondeok (폐비 신씨; 15 December 1476 – 16 May 1537)
  - Grandfather - Shin Seung-seon, Internal Prince Geochang (장성공 거창부원군; 1436–1502)
  - Grandmother - County Princess Jungmo, of the Jeonju Yi clan (1435–?) (중모현주 전주 이씨)

Siblings

- Unnamed older brother (1490–1494)
- Younger sister - Princess Yi Bok-eok (공주 이복억; 李福億; 1496–1498)
- Younger brother - Deposed Crown Prince Yi Hwang (폐왕세자 이황; 10 January 1498 – 24 September 1506)
- Younger brother - Yi Seong, Grand Prince Changnyeong (이성 창녕대군; 18 June 1501 – 10 October 1507)
- Younger brother - Grand Prince Yi Yeong-su (대군 이영수; 李榮壽; 1501–1503)
- Younger brother - Grand Prince Yi In-su (대군 이인수; 李仁壽; 1502 – 12 September 1506)

Husband

- Gu Mun-gyeong, Lord Neungyang (구문경 능양위; 具文璟 綾陽尉; 1491–?) (Note: Second son of County Princess Gilan (길안현주). His elder brother, Gu Hui-gyeong (구희경) married Princess Hwisin's first cousin, the only daughter of her maternal uncle, Shin Su-gyeom (신수겸); they became great-grandparents of Queen Inheon.)

Issue

- Son - Gu Eom (구엄; 1512–?)
