= Deposed Crown Prince Yi Hwang =

Crown Prince of Joseon (1498–1506)

Crown Prince of Joseon
- Tenure: 25 October 1502 – 28 September 1506
- Predecessor: Crown Prince Yung
- Successor: Crown Prince Ho
- Born: 19 January 1498; Hanseong, Joseon
- Died: 20 October 1506 (aged 8); Jeongseon County, Gangwon Province, Joseon
Names
- Yi Hwang (이황; 李𩔇)
- Clan: Jeonju Yi
- Dynasty: Yi
- Father: Yeonsangun
- Mother: Queen Shin
- Religion: Confucianism (Neo-Confucianism)

Korean name
- Hangul: 폐세자 이황
- Hanja: 廢世子 李𩔇
- RR: Pyeseja I Hwang
- MR: P'yeseja I Hwang

Childhood name
- Hangul: 금돌이
- Hanja: 金乭伊
- RR: Geumdoli
- MR: Kŭmdori

Yi Hwang (Korean: 이황; Hanja: 李𩔇; 19 January 1498 – 20 October 1506) (Note: In the Korean calendar (lunisolar), he was born on the 18th day of the 12th lunar month and died on the 24th day of the 9th lunar month.) was the eldest son of Yeonsangun, the 10th monarch of Joseon. He was invested as crown prince three months before his fifth birthday, then lost his position when his infamous father was dethroned in a coup d'état.

== Biography ==
Yi Hwang was the fifth child and eldest surviving son of Yeonsangun and Queen Shin. He was born about 100 years after the founding of Joseon, and was the first case of an heir to the throne being a descendant of King Taejo through both paternal and maternal lines.

Displaying intelligence and a benevolent nature from a young age, he garnered great expectations from officials suffering under Yeonsangun's tyranny. It is said that Yi Hwang possessed a thirst for knowledge and resembled the demeanor of his grandfather, King Seongjong. According to unofficial histories, when Queen Shin's eldest brother, Shin Su-geun (신수근), received a request from Park Won-jong to participate in the coup, he reportedly said, "The Crown Prince is intelligent, so let's place our hopes on him."

Following his father's deposition, Yi Hwang was sent into exile and executed alongside his three younger brothers. The four children's funerals, which King Jungjong had intended to be lavish after having been pressured into executing them, were ultimately held in a simple manner. The location of their tombs remains unknown.

== Family ==
- Father: Yeonsangun (연산군; 2 December 1476 – 30 November 1506)
  - Grandfather: King Seongjong (성종대왕; 28 August 1457 – 29 January 1495)
  - Biological grandmother: Deposed Queen (폐비), of the Haman Yun clan (함안 윤씨; 24 July 1455 – 7 September 1482)
  - Adoptive grandmother: Queen Jeonghyeon (정현왕후), of the Papyeong Yun clan (파평 윤씨; 30 July 1462 – 23 September 1530)
- Mother: Queen (왕비), of the Geochang Shin clan (거창 신씨; 24 December 1476 – 26 May 1537)
  - Grandfather: Shin Seung-seon (신승선), Internal Prince Geochang (거창부원군; 1436–1502)
  - Grandmother: County Princess Jungmo (중모현주), of the Jeonju Yi clan (전주 이씨; 1435–?)

== Ancestry ==
Ancestors of Deposed Crown Prince Yi Hwang

King Sejo (세조대왕)
King Deokjong (덕종대왕)
Queen Jeonghui, of the Papyeong Yun clan (정희왕후 파평 윤씨)
King Seongjong (성종대왕)
Han Hwak, Internal Prince Seowon (서원부원군 한확)
Queen Sohye, of the Cheongju Han clan (소혜왕후 청주 한씨)
Internal Princess Consort Namyang, of the Namyang Hong clan (남양부부인 남양 홍씨)
Yeonsangun (연산군)
Yun Eung (윤응)
Yun Gi-gyeon, Internal Prince Haman (함안부원군 윤기견)
Lady, of the Andong Gwon clan (안동 권씨)
Deposed Queen, of the Haman Yun clan (폐비 함안 윤씨)
Shin Pyeong (신평)
Internal Princess Consort Jangheung, of the Goryeong Shin clan (장흥부부인 고령 신씨)
Lady, of the Jangheung Ma clan (장흥 마씨)
Yi Hwang
Shin I-chung (신이충)
Shin Jeon (신전)
Lady, of the Sunchang Seol clan (순창 설씨)
Shin Seung-seon, Internal Prince Geochang (거창부원군 신승선)
An Gang (안강)
Lady, of the Sunheung An clan (순흥 안씨)
Lady, of the Hanyang Jo clan (한양 조씨)
Queen, of the Geochang Shin clan (왕비 거창 신씨)
King Sejong (세종대왕)
Grand Prince Imyong (임영대군)
Queen Soheon, of the Cheongsong Shim clan (소헌왕후 청송 심씨)
County Princess Jungmo, of the Jeonju Yi clan (중모현주 전주 이씨)
Choe Seung-nyeong (최승녕)
Grand Princess Consort Jean, of the Jeonju Choe clan (제안부부인 전주 최씨)
Lady, of the Pyongsan Shin clan (평산 신씨)

== See also ==
- Jungjong Restoration
- Styles and titles in Joseon
- History of Korea
