= Yi Hwang (disambiguation) =

Yi Hwang (1501–1570) was a Korean philosopher and writer.

Yi Hwang or Lee Hwang can also refer to:

- Yi Hwang, the founder of the Goseong Lee clan
- Yi Hwang (1450 – 1469), the personal name of King Yejong of Joseon
- Yi Hwang (1498 – 1506), deposed crown prince of Joseon, and son of Yeonsangun.
