= Kwŏn Ram =

Korean scholar-official (1416–1465)

Kwŏn Ram 권람

Left State Councillor
- In office June 17, 1462 – October 11, 1463
- Preceded by: Sin Sukchu
- Succeeded by: Han Myŏnghoe

Right State Councillor
- In office December 9, 1459 – June 17, 1462
- Preceded by: Yi Inson
- Succeeded by: Han Myŏnghoe
- In office November 30, 1459 – December 5, 1459
- Preceded by: Sin Sukchu
- Succeeded by: Yi Inson

Personal details
- Born: June 2, 1416 Hanseong, Joseon
- Died: February 6, 1465 (aged 48) Hanseong, Joseon

Korean name
- Hangul: 권람
- Hanja: 權擥
- RR: Gwon Ram
- MR: Kwŏn Ram

Art name
- Hangul: 소한당
- Hanja: 所閑堂, 所閒堂
- RR: Sohandang
- MR: Sohandang

Courtesy name
- Hangul: 정경
- Hanja: 正卿
- RR: Jeonggyeong
- MR: Chŏnggyŏng

Posthumous name
- Hangul: 익평
- Hanja: 翼平
- RR: Ikpyeong
- MR: Ikp'yŏng

Kwŏn Ram (Korean: 권람; Hanja: 權擥; June 2, 1416 – February 6, 1465), art name Sohandang (소한당) was a Korean politician, writer, and historian of the Joseon period. He served as Left State Councillor, and the entourage of Sejo of Joseon.

He was the nephew of Princess Gyeongan (Note: She was the third daughter of Queen Wongyeong and King Taejong), and father-in-law of general Nam I (Note: He was the grandson of Princess Jeongseon and the great-grandson of Queen Wŏn'gyŏng and King Taejong) and Sin Sugŭn (Note: He was the older brother of Queen Jeinwondeok, and the father of Queen Dangyeong, the first wife of the 11th King, Jungjong of Joseon).

== Family ==
- Grandfather
  - Kwŏn Kŭn (권근; 1352 – February 14, 1409)
- Grandmother
  - Princess Sukgyŏng, Lady Yi of the Gyeongju Yi clan (숙경택주 경주 이씨; 淑敬宅主 慶州 李氏; 1367–1423); eldest daughter of Yi Jun-oh (이존오; 李存吾), Kwon Geun’s second wife
- Father
  - Kwŏn Che (권제; 1387–1445)
- Mother
  - Lady Lee of the Jeonui Lee clan (전의 이씨; 全義 李氏; 1385–1468); eldest daughter of Lee Jun (판사제감사 이준; 李儁), Kwŏn Che's first wife
- Wife
  - Princess Consort Yŏngwŏn of the Goseong Yi clan (영원군부인 고성 이씨; 寧原郡夫人 固城 李氏; 1415 – 18 October 1491); daughter of Internal Prince Cheolseong Yi Won (철성부원군 이원; 1368–1429)
- Children
  - Daughter - Lady Kwŏn of the Andong Kwŏn clan (1435–?)
  - Daughter - Lady Kwŏn of the Andong Kwŏn clan (1437–?)
  - Daughter - Lady Kwŏn of the Andong Kwŏn clan (1439–?)
  - Daughter - Lady Kwŏn of the Andong Kwŏn clan (1441–?)
    - Son-in-law - Nam I (남이; 南怡; 1441–1468)
  - Daughter - Lady Kwŏn of the Andong Kwŏn clan (1445–1530)
  - Son - Kwŏn Kŏl (권걸; 權傑; 1447–1476)
  - Daughter - Internal Princess Consort Yŏngga of the Andong Kwŏn clan (영가부부인 안동 권씨; 永嘉府夫人 安東 權氏; 1448–?); Sin Sugŭn's first wife
    - Son-in-law - Sin Sugŭn (신수근; 愼守勤; 1450–1506)
      - Step-granddaughter - Queen Dangyeong of the Geochang Sin clan (단경왕후 신씨; 7 February 1487 – 27 December 1557)
  - Daughter - Lady Kwŏn of the Andong Kwŏn clan (1449–?)
  - Daughter - Lady Kwŏn of the Andong Kwŏn clan (1455–1517)
  - Son - Kwŏn Kŏn (권건; 權健; 1458–1501)

== Works ==
- Tongguk t'onggam
- 《Yŏkdae pyŏngyo》 (역대병요; 歷代兵要)
- 《Sohandang chip》(소한당집; 所閑堂集)
- 《Ŭngjesi chu》 (응제시주; 應製詩註)

== Popular culture ==
- Portrayed by Lee Dae-yeon in the 2011 KBS2 TV series The Princess' Man.
- Portrayed by Kim Yong-hee in the 2011 JTBC TV series Insu, The Queen Mother.
