= Sim Ŭigyŏm =

Joseon scholar-official (1535–1587)

- Korean name
- Hangul: 심의겸
- Hanja: 沈義謙
- RR: Sim Uigyeom
- MR: Sim Ŭigyŏm

Art name
- Hangul: 손암, 간암, 황재
- Hanja: 巽菴, 艮菴, 黃齋
- RR: Sonam, Ganam, Hwangjae
- MR: Sonam, Kanam, Hwangjae

Courtesy name
- Hangul: 방숙
- Hanja: 方叔
- RR: Bangsuk
- MR: Pangsuk

Sim Ŭigyŏm (Korean: 심의겸; Hanja: 沈義謙; 1535–1587) was a Korean philosopher and politician during the Joseon period. A Neo-Confucian scholar, he was the head of the Westerners political faction. Sim was also the younger brother of Queen Insun and a member of the Cheongsong Shim clan (청송 심씨; 靑松 沈氏). Through his father, Sim is a fourth great-grandson of Shim On and great-great-great-grandnephew of Queen Soheon. He eventually became the fifth great-granduncle of Queen Danui.

== Family ==
- Father
  - Shim Gang (심강; 沈鋼; 1514–1567)
- Mother
  - Internal Princess Consort Wansan of the Jeonju Yi clan (완산부부인 전주 이씨; 完山府夫人 全州 李氏; 1512–1559)
- Siblings
  - Older sister: Queen Insun of the Cheongsong Shim clan (인순왕후 심씨; 仁順王后 沈氏; 27 June 1532 – 12 February 1575)
    - Brother-in-law: Yi Hwan, King Myeongjong (명종 이환; 3 July 1534 – 3 August 1567)
      - Nephew: Yi Bu, Crown Prince Sunhoe (순회세자 이부; 1 July 1551 – 6 October 1563)
      - Adoptive nephew: Yi Yeon, King Seonjo (선조 이연; 26 November 1552 – 16 March 1608)
  - Older brother: Shim In-gyeom (심인겸; 沈仁謙; 1533–1580)
  - Younger brother: Shim Ye-gyeom (심예겸; 沈禮謙; 1537–1587)
  - Younger sister: Lady Shim of the Cheongsong Shim clan (청송 심씨; 1538–1579)
  - Younger brother: Shim Ji-gyeom (심지겸; 沈智謙; 1540–1568)
  - Younger brother: Shim Sin-gyeom (심신겸; 沈信謙; 1542–1596)
  - Younger sister: Lady Shim of the Cheongsong Shim clan (청송 심씨; 1543–?)
  - Younger brother: Shim Chung-gyeom (심충겸; 沈忠謙; 1545–1594)
  - Younger brother: Shim Hyo-gyeom (심효겸; 沈孝謙; 20 September 1547 – 24 September 1600)
  - Younger brother: Shim Je-gyeom (심제겸; 沈悌謙; 1550–1589)
  - Younger sister: Lady Shim of the Cheongsong Shim clan (청송 심씨; 1556–?)

Consort(s) and issue

- Lady Han of the Cheongju Han clan (정부인 청주 한씨; 貞夫人 淸州 韓氏; 1532–1613)
  - Son: Shim Non (심논; 沈惀)
  - Son: Shim Eom (심엄, 沈㤿; 1563–1624)
    - Daughter-in-law: Lady Gu of the Neungseong Gu clan (능성 구씨; 綾城 具氏; 1563–1620)
  - Daughter: Lady Shim of the Cheongsong Shm clan (청송 심씨; 1574–1647)
    - Son-in-law: Yun Hwon (윤훤; 尹暄; 1573 – 15 February 1672), of the Haepyeong Yun clan (해평 윤씨; 海平 尹氏)
      - Grandson: Yun Sun-ji (윤순지; 尹順之; 1591–1666)
      - Grandson: Yun Won-ji (윤원지; 尹元之; 1596–1641)
      - Granddaughter: Lady Yun (윤씨; 1596–1656)
      - Grandson: Yun Jing-ji (윤징지; 尹澄之; 1601–1661)
      - Grandson: Yun Ui-ji (윤의지; 尹誼之; 1605–1666)

== See also ==
- Kim Hyowŏn
- Yi Hwang
- Queen Soheon
- Queen Insun
- Shim On
