= Yi Ryang =

Korean philosopher (1519–1583)

- Korean name
- Hangul: 이량
- Hanja: 李梁
- RR: I Ryang
- MR: I Ryang

Courtesy name
- Hangul: 공거
- Hanja: 公擧
- RR: Gonggeo
- MR: Konggŏ

Yi Ryang (Korean: 이량; Hanja: 李梁; 17 November 1519 – 8 March 1583), also spelled Lee Lyang, was a powerful politician during the Joseon period. His courtesy name was Gonggeo (공거; 公擧). He was Queen Insun's maternal uncle and a descendant of Grand Prince Hyoryeong.

== Biography ==
Yi Ryang was a member of the ruling Jeonju Yi clan and was a great-great-great-grandson of Grand Prince Hyoryeong through his son Yi Gab, Prince Boseong.

His older sister, Lady Yi, was the wife of Sim Kang. Their daughter, Lady Sim, married Grand Prince Gyungwon, a son of King Jungjong, who later became Myeongjong of Joseon.

In his early years, Yi Ryang studied at Chung Sa-ryong's private academies.

In 1546, he passed to Saengwon and Chinsa exams and in 1552, he passed the Imperial examination. Yi Ryang worked in the Inspection Department.

In 1550, there was tension with Yun Wŏnhyŏng's group of supporters, who were trying to take more government power at the time, and Yi Ryang was promoted rapidly under the auspices of King Myeongjong. He was promoted to second level bureaucrat after only two years.

In 1563, it was discovered that Yi Ryang had illegally accumulated wealth. As a result, he was ousted from the government, but his punishment was lessened due to Yun Wŏnhyŏng's intervention.

Yi Ryang died in exile on March 8, 1583.

== Family ==
- Father
  - Yi Dae, Prince Jeonseong (전성군 이대; 全城君 李薱; 21 July 1488 – 29 December 1543)
- Mother
  - Lady Jeong of the Dongnae Jeong clan (동래 정씨; 1489 – 9 January 1557)
- Sibling(s)
  - Older brother: Yi Jeub (이즙, 李楫; 1503 - 10 February 1580)
  - Older brother: Yi Baek (이백, 李栢; 1504–?)
  - Older brother: Yi Geon (이건, 李楗; 1505–1571)
  - Older brother: Yi Ryeok (이력; 1507–?)
  - Older brother: Yi No (이노, 李櫓; 1509–1566)
  - Older sister: Yi Hui-gyeong, Internal Princess Consort Wansan of the Jeonju Yi clan (이희경 완산부부인 전주 이씨; 1512 - 1559)
    - Niece: Queen Insun of the Cheongseong Sim clan (인순왕후 심씨; 27 June 1532 - 12 February 1575)
    - Nephew: Sim Ŭigyŏm (1535–1587)
  - Older brother: Yi Park (이박, 李樸; 1515 - 7 September 1563)
  - Younger brother: Yi Oh (이오; 李悟; 1520–?)
- Wives and their issue(s):
  - Lady Yun of the Haman Yun clan (함안 윤씨; 1513–?); eldest daughter of Yun Ji-chong (윤지청; 尹之淸; 1480–?)
    - Son: Yi Jeong-bin (이정빈; 李廷賓; 8 August 1539 – 7 September 1592)
      - Daughter-in-law: Lady Han of the Cheongju Han clan (청주 한씨; 1543 – 9 November 1592)
    - Daughter: Lady Yi of the Jeonju Yi clan (전주 이씨; 1544–?)
      - Son-in-law: Kim Bong-seo (김봉서; 金鳳瑞) of the Gwangsan Kim clan (1548–?)
    - Son: Yi Se-bin (이세빈; 李世賓; 1551–1573)
    - Son: Yi Eon-bin (이언빈; 李彦賓; 1555-?)
    - Son: Yi Han-bin (이한빈; 李漢賓; 1560–?)
  - Lady Yun of the Papyeong Yun clan (파평 윤씨; 1512–?); daughter of Yun Ji-yang (윤지양; 尹之讓; 1482–?) — No issue.
  - Unnamed concubine
    - Unnamed son

== Books ==
- Yongsailgi (龍蛇日記, 용사일기)
- Munsuji (文殊志, 문수지)
- Saseonggangmok (四姓綱目, 사성강목)
