= Diary of King Yeonsan (film) =

- Theatrical release poster
- Hangul: 연산일기
- Hanja: 燕山日記
- RR: Yeonsanilgi
- MR: Yŏnsanilgi
- Directed by: Im Kwon-taek
- Written by: Lee Sang-hyeon
- Produced by: Yeo Jeong-ho
- Starring: Yu In-chon
- Cinematography: Koo Joong-mo
- Edited by: Im Kwon-taek
- Music by: Shin Byung-ha
- Distributed by: Pung Jeong Enterprises Co., Ltd.
- Release date: February 18, 1988
- Running time: 118 minutes
- Country: South Korea
- Language: Korean

Diary of King Yeonsan (Korean: 연산일기; RR: Yeonsanilgi) is a 1988 South Korean film directed by Im Kwon-taek. It was chosen as Best Film at the Grand Bell Awards.

== Premise ==
A historical drama on the life of Yeonsangun of Joseon, who was the subject of director Shin Sang-ok's award-winning Prince Yeonsan (1961).

== Cast ==
- Yu In-chon as Prince Yeonsan / King Yeonsan
- Kim Jin-ah as Royal Consort Jang Nok-soo
- Kwon Jae-hee as Deposed Queen Shin
- Kim In-moon as Kim Ja-won
- Ma Hung-sik
- Kim Young-ae as Princess Consort Seungpyeong / Deposed Queen Yoon
- Yoon Yang-ha as King Seongjong
- Han Eun-jin as Dowager Queen Insu
- Ban Hyo-jung as Queen Jeonghyeon
- Kang Kye-shik
- Kim Gil-ho
- Na Han-il as Shin Soo-geun
- Kim Woon-ja
- Lee Ye-min
- Lee Do-ryeon
- Lee Seok-gu
- Choi-jun
- Oh Hee-chan
- Hwang-gun
- Jang Jung-gook
- Lee Gyung-yung as King Jungjong
- Choi Sung-gwan
- Yoon Il-joo
- Lee Gi-yung
- Oh Do-gyoo
- Im Saeng-chool
- Park Eun-ho
- Kim Jung-suk
- Kim Dae-hee
- Kim Yong-joon
- Kim Ha-gyoon
- Moon Hyun-hak
- Lee Min-soo
- Lee Seung-ho
- Choi Doo-han
- Oh Yung-hwa
- Yoo Myung-soon
- Kwak Eun-gyung
- Kim Ji-yung
- Jun-sook
- Suk In-soo
- Kim Ae-ra
- Park Ye-sook
- Joo Hee-ah
- Moon Jung-hee
- Im Hee-soo
- Yeo Won-sun
- Hong Won-sun

Preceded by Pillar of Mist	Grand Bell Awards for Best Film; 1987	Succeeded by Come Come Come Upward
