= Prince Yangpyeong =

Korean prince

- Hangul: 이인
- Hanja: 李仁
- RR: I In
- MR: I In

Royal title
- Hangul: 양평군
- Hanja: 陽平君
- RR: Yangpyeonggun
- MR: Yangp'yŏnggun

Childhood name
- Hangul: 이강수
- Hanja: 李康壽
- RR: I Gangsu
- MR: I Kangsu

Prince Yangpyeong (Korean: 양평군; Hanja: 陽平君; 1498 – 10 October 1506) was a Korean prince and the only son of Yeonsangun of Joseon and Royal Consort Suk-ui of the Yangseong Yi clan. His personal name was Yi In (이인; 李仁) or Yi Seong (이성; 亞誠) and his childhood name was Yi Gang-su (이강수; 李康壽).
