= Grand Prince Ch'angnyŏng =

Korean prince (1500–1506)

- Hangul: 이성
- Hanja: 李誠
- RR: I Seong
- MR: I Sŏng

Royal title
- Hangul: 창녕대군
- Hanja: 昌寧大君
- RR: Changnyeong daegun
- MR: Ch'angnyŏng taegun

Grand Prince Ch'angnyŏng (Korean: 창녕대군; Hanja: 昌寧大君; 18 June 1500 – 10 October 1506), his personal name was Yi Sŏng (이성; 李誠) was a Korean Royal Prince as the fourth son (formally as second son) of Yeonsangun of Joseon and Deposed Queen Shin of the Geochang Sin clan.
