= Yeonsangun of Joseon =

King of Joseon from 1495 to 1506

Yeonsangun

King of Joseon
- Reign: 29 January 1495 – 28 September 1506
- Enthronement: 3 February 1495; Injeongjeon, Changdeokgung
- Predecessor: Seongjong
- Successor: Jungjong

Crown Prince of Joseon
- Reign: 23 March 1483 – 29 January 1495
- Predecessor: Crown Prince Hwang
- Successor: Crown Prince Hwang
- Born: 2 December 1476; Gangnyeongjeon, Gyeongbokgung, Hanseong, Joseon
- Died: 30 November 1506 (aged 29); Ganghwa, Joseon
- Burial: Yeonsangunmyo, Seoul, South Korea
- Spouse: Queen Shin (m. 1488)
- Issue Detail: 10 sons, 9 daughters
Names
- Yi Yung (이융; 李㦕)
Era dates
- Adopted the era name of the Ming dynasty (Note: Hongchi (Hongzhi) (홍치; 弘治): 1495–1505 Jeongdeok (Zhengde) (정덕; 正德): 1506)
Regnal name
- Heoncheon Hongdo Gyeongmun Wimu (헌천홍도경문위무; 憲天弘道經文緯武) (Note: Known as honorific name (존호; 尊號) in the Sinosphere, its closest equivalent in the English-speaking world is the regnal name.)
- Clan: Jeonju Yi
- Dynasty: Yi
- Father: King Seongjong
- Mother: Deposed Queen Yun (biological); Queen Jeonghyeon (adoptive)
- Religion: Confucianism (Neo-Confucianism)

Korean name
- Hangul: 연산군
- Hanja: 燕山君
- Lit.: "Prince Yeonsan"
- RR: Yeonsangun
- MR: Yŏnsan'gun

Childhood name
- Hangul: 무작금
- Hanja: 無作金
- RR: Mujakgeum
- MR: Mujakkŭm

Yeonsangun or Prince Yeonsan (Korean: 연산군; Hanja: 燕山君; 2 December 1476 – 30 November 1506), (Note: In the Korean calendar (lunisolar), he was born on the 7th day of the 11th lunar month and died on the 6th day of the 11th lunar month.) personal name Yi Yung, was the 10th monarch of Joseon. He was the eldest surviving son of King Seongjong and the Deposed Queen Yun, whose execution has been cited as the primary catalyst for his descent into madness. Often considered the worst tyrant in Joseon's history and perhaps all Korean history, Yeonsangun is notorious for launching two bloody purges, seizing hundreds of women from all over the peninsula to serve as palace entertainers, and appropriating Sungkyunkwan as a personal pleasure ground. His despotic rule provided a stark contrast to the liberal era of his father, and as a much-despised overthrown king, he did not receive a temple name.

== Biography ==
=== Execution of his mother ===
Lady Yun, later known as the Deposed Queen Yun, served Yeonsangun's father, King Seongjong, as a concubine until the death of Queen Gonghye, Seongjong's first wife. With no heir, the king was urged by counselors to take a second wife to secure the royal succession. Lady Yun was chosen for her beauty and was formally married in 1476. Several months later, she gave birth to Yi Yung.

The new queen proved to be temperamental and highly jealous of the other concubines, even going as far as poisoning one of them in 1477. One night in 1479, she physically struck her husband (the king) and left scratch marks. Despite his efforts to conceal the injury, Seongjong's mother, Royal Queen Dowager Insu, discovered the truth and ordered Lady Yun into exile. After several attempts to restore the deposed queen to her former position, government officials petitioned that she be executed. Queen Yun died in 1482, after being ordered to commit suicide by drinking poison.

=== Literati purges ===
The crown prince grew up believing that he was the son of Queen Jeonghyeon, his father's third wife. He succeeded to the throne in 1495 and during his early reign, he was a wise and able administrator who strengthened the national defense and aided the poor. However, he also showed signs of a violent side when he killed Jo Sa-seo, one of his tutors, soon after becoming king.

Yeonsangun eventually learned the truth about his biological mother and attempted to posthumously restore her titles and position. However, government officials belonging to the Sarim faction opposed his efforts on account of serving Seongjong's will, and greatly displeased, Yeonsangun started looking for ways to eliminate them.

In 1498, Kim Il-son, a disciple of Kim Chong-jik, included a paragraph in the royal records that was critical of King Sejo's coup d'état (1455). Kim Il-son and other followers of Kim Chong-jik were accused of treason by a rival faction, giving the king cause enough to order the execution of many Sarim officials and the mutilation of Kim Chong-jik's remains. This came to be known as the First Literati Purge (Muo Sahwa; 무오사화, 戊午士禍).

In 1504, Im Sa-hong revealed to Yeonsangun the details of his mother's death and showed him a blood-stained piece of clothing that was obtained from Lady Yun's mother, the blood allegedly vomited by her after taking poison.

Subsequently, Yeonsangun beat to death two of his father's concubines, Lady Jeong and Lady Eom, for their part in his mother's death. His grandmother, Grand Royal Queen Dowager Insu, also died soon after he pushed her during an altercation. He sentenced to death many government officials who had supported the execution of his mother, now posthumously honored as "Queen Jeheon" (제헌왕후; 齊獻王后), and ordered the grave of Han Myŏnghoe to be opened and the head to be cut off the corpse.

Yeonsangun went as far as punishing officials who were simply present at the royal court at that time, for the crime of not preventing the actions of those who abused his mother. This came to be known as the Second Literati Purge (Gapja Sahwa; 갑자사화, 甲子士禍). Meanwhile, Im Sa-hong and his allies were promoted and they received many important offices and other rewards.

=== Suppression of free speech and learning ===
Yeonsangun closed Sungkyunkwan, the royal university, as well as the temple Wongaksa, and converted them into personal pleasure grounds, for which young girls were gathered from the eight provinces. He also demolished a large residential area in the capital and evicted 20,000 residents to build hunting grounds. People were forced into involuntary labor to work on these projects. Many commoners mocked and insulted him with posters written in hangul, and in retaliation, Yeonsangun banned the use of the script. Furthermore, Yeonsangun was the only monarch of the Joseon dynasty who tried to dismantle Buddhism in Joseon; he attempted to abolish the system of head monasteries and examinations during his reign.

When court officials protested against his actions, he abolished the Office of Censors (whose function was to criticize any inappropriate actions or policies of the king) and the Office of Special Advisors (a library and research institute that advised the king with Confucian teachings). He ordered his ministers to wear a sign that read: "A mouth is a door that brings in disaster; a tongue is a sword that cuts off a head. A body will be in peace as long as its mouth is closed and its tongue is deep within" (口是禍之門 舌是斬身刀 閉口深藏舌 安身處處牢).

Chief Eunuch Kim Cheo-sun, who had served three kings, tried to convince him to change his ways, but Yeonsangun killed him by shooting him with arrows and personally cutting off his limbs. In addition, he also punished the eunuch's relatives down to the 7th degree, and when he asked the royal secretaries whether such punishment was appropriate, they did not dare to say otherwise.

=== Hangul ban ===
On July 19, 1504, the 10th year of Yeonsan's reign, three tuseos (Note: An act of writing and secretly sending a letter to an organization or a designated recipient, to report an unrevealed fact or someone's fault; or such a letter. ( 투서 Pronunciation: 'tuseo' ) at korean.dict.naver.com) (투서; 投書) written in Hangul and mocking and insulting him for his tyranny were discovered. The tuseos criticized him for his violence towards his ministers and his lust for women. The author was unidentifiable. Enraged, Yeonsan ordered a total ban on the learning, teaching, or using of Hangul, and ordered the five Hansung administrative districts to identify and report all the individuals who knew how to use it, and to punish people who did not report on their neighbors. He also ordered comparisons of the handwriting of people who had been reported. In addition, he offered high-ranking titles and large amounts of money as rewards for identifying the author.

On July 22, Yeonsan ordered the beheading of people who were using Hangul, and severe beatings (곤장; 棍杖) for persons who did not report others. He ordered his court's ministers to burn all the books in their homes with Hangul gugyeol footnotes. However, he allowed Hangul books translated from hanja, or Unhaeseo (언해서; 諺解書). These books were often the works of a former monarch, and it is speculated that even a tyrant like Yeonsan could not have purged the achievements of the former monarchs, who were also his ancestors.

The rounding up of people who knew Hangul and the investigations continued through early August, but they failed to catch the culprit, and Yeonsan's short-lived Hangul ban was over. Later in December, Yeonsan himself ordered the translations of "calendar-books" (역서; 曆書) into Hangul, and in September of the following year he ordered the translation and recital of a "mourning script" (제문; 祭文) regarding a dead court woman.

=== Dethronement ===
In 1506, the 12th year of Yeonsangun's reign, a group of officials — notably Pak Wŏnjong, Sŏng Hŭian, Yu Sunjŏng, and Hong Gyeong-ju (Note: His daughter would later become Concubine Hui, a consort of King Jungjong.) — plotted against the despotic ruler. They launched their coup in September 1506, deposing the king and replacing him with his younger half-brother, Grand Prince Jinseong. The king was demoted to "Prince Yeonsan" (Yeonsangun; 연산군) and sent into exile on Ganghwa Island, where he died after two months. His concubine, Jang Nok-su, who had encouraged and supported his misrule, was beheaded. In addition, despite the new king's reluctance, Yeonsangun's four young sons were also forced to commit suicide by poison only a few weeks later.

== Family ==
- Father: King Seongjong (성종대왕; 28 August 1457 – 29 January 1495)
  - Biological grandfather: King Deokjong (덕종대왕; 12 October 1438 – 29 September 1457)
  - Adoptive grandfather: King Yejong (예종대왕; 23 January 1450 – 9 January 1470)
  - Biological grandmother: Queen Sohye (소혜왕후), of the Cheongju Han clan (청주 한씨; 16 October 1437 – 21 May 1504)
  - Adoptive grandmother: Queen Ansun (안순왕후), of the Cheongju Han clan (청주 한씨; 27 April 1445 – 12 February 1499)
- Biological mother: Deposed Queen (폐비), of the Haman Yun clan (함안 윤씨; 24 July 1455 – 7 September 1482)
  - Grandfather: Yun Gi-gyeon (윤기견), Internal Prince Haman (함안부원군)
  - Grandmother: Internal Princess Consort Jangheung (장흥부부인), of the Goryeong Shin clan (고령 신씨; ?–1504)
- Adoptive mother: Queen Jeonghyeon (정현왕후), of the Papyeong Yun clan (파평 윤씨; 30 July 1462 – 23 September 1530)

Consort(s) and their respective issue

- Queen (왕비), of the Geochang Shin clan (거창 신씨; 24 December 1476 – 26 May 1537)
  - Princess Hwisin (휘신공주; 2 November 1491 – 1524), given name Su-eok (수억), first daughter
  - Unnamed daughter (c. 1492–?)
  - Unnamed son (1494)
  - Unnamed daughter (1495–?)
  - Yi Hwang (이황), Crown Prince (왕세자; 19 January 1498 – 20 October 1506), first son
  - Yi Seong (이성), Grand Prince Changnyeong (창녕대군; 18 June 1500 – 20 October 1506), third son
  - Unnamed son (1501–1503) (Note: His childhood name was In-su (인수).)
  - Unnamed son (1502)
- Sugui (숙의), of the Yangseong Yi clan (양성 이씨), given name Jeong-yi (정이)
  - Yi In (이인), Prince Yangpyeong (양평군; 1498 – 20 October 1506), second son
- Sugui (숙의), of the Haepyeong Yun clan (해평 윤씨; 11 March 1481 – 1 August 1568)
- Sugui (숙의), of the Hyeonpung Gwak clan (현풍 곽씨)
- Sugui (숙의), of the Andong Gwon clan (안동 권씨)
- Sugui (숙의), of the Yeoheung Min clan (여흥 민씨)
- Sugyong (숙용), of the Heungdeok Jang clan (흥덕 장씨; c. 1470 – 28 September 1506), given name Nok-su (녹수) (Note: Beheaded during the Jungjong Restoration.)
  - Lady, of the Jeonju Yi clan (전주 이씨; 1502–?), second daughter (Note: Her childhood or given name was Yeong-su (영수).)
- Sugyong (숙용), of the Damyang Jeon clan (담양 전씨; ? – 28 September 1506), given name Jeon-bi (전비)
  - Unnamed daughter
- Sugyong (숙용), of the Hanyang Jo clan (한양 조씨)
- Sugwon (숙원), of the Choe clan (최씨), personal name Bo-bi (보비)
- Sugwon (숙원), of the Jang clan (장씨)
- Sugwon (숙원), of the Yi clan (이씨)
- Sugwon (숙원), of the Kim clan (숙원 김씨; ? – 28 September 1506), given name Gwi-bi (귀비)
- Palace Lady (궁인), of the Choe clan (나인 최씨; ?–1504), given name Jeon-hyang (전향) (Note: Executed.)
- Palace Lady (궁인), of a certain clan (모씨; ?–1504), given name Su-geun-bi (수근비)
- Palace Lady (궁인), of the Jeong clan (정씨), given name Geum (금)
  - Lady, of the Jeonju Yi clan (전주 이씨), third daughter (Note: Her childhood or given name was Ham-geum (함금).)
- Palace Lady (궁인), of the Kim clan (김씨; ? – 28 September 1506), given name Suk-hwa (숙화)
- Palace Lady (의녀), of the Kang clan (강씨), given name Geum (금) (Note: Uinyeo (의녀; 醫女); female physician in the internal court.)
- Lady, of the An clan (안씨)
- Lady, of the Jang clan (장씨)
- Courtesan Wolhamae (월하매; ?–1505)
- Unknown
  - Unnamed daughter (1499–?) (Note: Her childhood or given name was Bok-eok (복억).)
  - Unnamed son (1501 – 20 October 1506) (Note: His childhood name was Don-su (돈수).)
  - Unnamed daughter (1501–?) (Note: Her childhood or given name was Bok-hap (복합).)
  - Unnamed son (?–1503) (Note: His childhood name was Chong-su (총수).)
  - Unnamed son (?–1503) (Note: His childhood name was Yeong-su (영수).)
  - Unnamed daughter (1505–?) (Note: Her childhood or given name was Jeong-su (정수).) (Note: Possibly the daughter of Sugyong Jeon (숙용 전씨).)
  - Unnamed son (1506) (Note: His childhood name was Tae-su (태수).)

== Ancestry ==
Ancestors of Yeonsangun of Joseon

King Sejong (세종대왕)
King Sejo (세조대왕)
Queen Soheon, of the Cheongsong Shim clan (소헌왕후 청송 심씨)
King Deokjong (덕종대왕)
Yun Beon, Internal Prince Papyeong (파평부원군 윤번)
Queen Jeonghui, of the Papyeong Yun clan (정희왕후 파평 윤씨)
Internal Princess Consort Heungnyeong, of the Incheon Yi clan (흥녕부부인 인천 이씨)
King Seongjong (성종대왕)
Han Yeong-jeong (한영정)
Han Hwak, Internal Prince Seowon (서원부원군 한확)
Lady, of the Uiseong Kim clan (의성 김씨)
Queen Sohye, of the Cheongju Han clan (소혜왕후 청주 한씨)
Hong Yeo-bang, Duke Munyang (문양공 홍여방)
Internal Princess Consort Namyang, of the Namyang Hong clan (남양부부인 남양 홍씨)
Lady, of the Dongnae Jeong clan (동래 정씨)
Yeonsangun
Yun Deuk-ryong (윤득룡)
Yun Eung (윤응)
Yun Gi-gyeon, Internal Prince Haman (함안부원군 윤기견)
Gwon So (권소)
Lady, of the Andong Gwon clan (안동 권씨)
Deposed Queen, of the Haman Yun clan (폐비 함안 윤씨)
Shin Po-si (신포시)
Shin Pyeong, Duke Jeongeun (정은공 신평)
Lady, of the Gyeongju Kim clan (경주 김씨)
Internal Princess Consort Jangheung, of the Goryeong Shin clan (장흥부부인 고령 신씨)
Ma Cheon-mok (마천목)
Lady, of the Jangheung Ma clan (장흥 마씨)
Lady, of the Gyeongju Yi clan (경주 이씨)

== In popular culture ==
- Portrayed by Shin Young-kyun in the 1961 film Prince Yeonsan and its 1962 sequel Tyrant Yeonasan.
- Portrayed by Yu In-chon in the 1988 film Diary of King Yeonsan.
- Portrayed by Yoo Dong-geun in the 1995 KBS2 TV series Jang Nok Soo.
- Portrayed by Ahn Jae-mo and Kim Hak-joon in the 1998–2000 KBS1 TV series The King and the Queen.
- Portrayed by Kim Yang-woo in the 2001–2002 SBS TV series Ladies in the Palace.
- Portrayed by Jung Ki-sung in the 2003–2004 MBC TV series Jewel in the Palace.
- Portrayed by Jung Jin-young in the 2005 film The King and the Clown.
- Portrayed by Jung Yoon-seok and Jung Tae-woo in the 2007–2008 SBS TV series The King and I.
- Portrayed by Jin Tae-hyun in the 2011–2012 JTBC TV series Insu, the Queen Mother.
- Portrayed by Kim Kang-woo in the 2015 film The Treacherous.
- Portrayed by Kim Ji-suk in the 2017 MBC TV series The Rebel.
- Portrayed by Ahn Do-gyu and Lee Dong-gun in the 2017 KBS2 TV series Queen for Seven Days.
- Inspired a fictional king portrayed by Lee Chae-min in the 2025 tvN TV series Bon Appétit, Your Majesty.
- Inspired a fictional king portrayed by Ha Seok-jin in the 2026 KBS2 TV series To My Beloved Thief.

== See also ==
- History of Korea
- List of monarchs of Korea
- Styles and titles in Joseon
- Politics of Joseon

== Notes ==
Yeonsangun of Joseon House of Yi Born: 2 December 1476 Died: 30 November 1506
Royal titles
Preceded by Seongjong	King of Joseon; 29 January 1495 – 28 September 1506	Succeeded by Jungjong
