= Prince Haean =

Yi Hui, Prince Haean (Korean: 해안군 이희; 15 June 1511 – 4 August 1573) was a royal family member of the Joseon period, the son of Jungjong of Joseon by his concubine, Hong Suk-ui.

== Life ==
=== Early life ===
Yi Hui was the second son of King Jungjong of Joseon born on 15 June 1511, by his father concubine, Suk-ui Hong of Namyang Hong clan, whom the king greatly favoured. He did not have any full siblings.

=== Later life ===
At the age of 7, in December 1518, he was given the title of Prince Haean (해안군). In 1522, The King ordered for the prince residence to be renovated.

== Family ==
- Father: Jungjong of Joseon (조선 중종왕; 16 April 1488 – 29 November 1544)
- Mother:Royal Consort Suk-ui of the Namyang Hong clan (숙의 홍씨; 1493–?)

Consorts and their respective issue(s):

- Honorable Madame (정부인): Princess Consort Jinsan, of the Jinju Ryu clan (진산군부인 진주 류씨; 1506 – 1532), daughter of Ryu Hong (류홍)
- Step Honorable Madame (계부인): Princess Consort Ikchang, of the Geochang Shin clan (익창군부인 거창 신씨; 1514 – 1567)
  - Yi Ye-Yeong (이예영, b. 1535), 1st daughter
- Concubine (첩): Ui Geom (의금), a slave
  - Yi Seom, Prince Seoreung (서릉군 이섬, 1537 - 1601), 1st son
- Concubine (첩) : Taesong (태성), a slave
  - Yi Gyehwan (이계환, b.1548), 2nd daughter
  - Yi Yeonghwan (이영환, b.1549), 3rd daughter
- Concubine (첩): Bogji (복지), a slave
  - Yi Hakjeong, Prince Seoheung (서흥군 이학정, 1549 – 1608), 2nd son
- Concubine (첩): Gaji (가지), a slave
  - Yi Gyeong, Prince Okcheon (오천군 이굉, b.1550), 3rd son
  - Yi Hyeon, Prince Osan (오산군 이현, 1551 – 1601), 4th son
  - Yi Geon, Prince Okang (오강군이건, 1560 – 1648), 6th son
  - Yi Gi-hwan (이기환, b. 1563), 5th daughter
- Concubine (첩): Bogeum (보금), a slave
  - Yi Geum, Prince Seocheon (서천군 이금, b. 1554), 5th son
- Concubine (첩): Bokga (복가), a slave
  - Yi Yeo-hwan (이여환, b. 1558), 4th daughter
