= Sŏkposangjŏl =

15th-century Korean Buddhist text

- Hangul: 석보상절
- Hanja: 釋譜詳節
- RR: Seokbosangjeol
- MR: Sŏkposangjŏl

The Sŏkposangjŏl (Korean: 석보상절; Hanja: 釋譜詳節) is a Korean biography of Gautama Buddha, together with a selection of his sermons, collected and compiled by Prince Suyang (later King Sejo) of Joseon.

The book is translated from Chinese sources, including the Lotus Sutra, the Kṣitigarbha Bodhisattva Pūrvapraṇidhāna Sūtra and the Amitabha Sutra. It is the first known instance of Buddhist sutras being translated from Chinese into Korean. Suyang commissioned the creation of the Sŏkposangjŏl after the death of his mother, Queen Soheon, intending it to ease her passage to the next life. It was, however, also made available to the general population of Korea, to encourage the propagation of the Buddhist faith. The text was first published in 24 volumes in 1447 C.E., although many of these volumes have since been lost. An original edition is held at the National Library of Korea in Seoul, where it is designated a Tangible Cultural Treasure.

The text is notable for being one of the earliest printed examples of Korea's native hangul characters. It was printed using moveable copper type called gabinja, the first form of printed type created after the invention of the hangul, and as such represents the oldest form of indigenous Korean written text.
