= Uiryeong Nam clan =

Korean clan from South Gyeongsang Province

- Country: Korea
- Current region: Uiryeong County
- Founder: Nam Min
- Connected members: Nam Joo-hyuk; Nam Ji-hyun; Nam Gyu-ri; Nam Duck-woo; Nam Kyung-pil; Nam Hyun-hee; Eric Nam; Nam Tae-hee; Dawon (singer); Nam Ji-hyun (actress, born 1990); Nam Woo-hyun
- Website: http://www.euiryungnam.kr/xe/

Uiryeong Nam clan (Korean: 의령 남씨; Hanja: 宜寧 南氏) is a Korean clan. Their Bon-gwan is in Uiryeong County, South Gyeongsang Province. According to research from 2015, the number of people in Uiryeong Nam clan was 162729. Their founder was Nam Min. Before he became naturalized, he was dispatched to Japan as an envoy. However, on his way back to Korea, he had a shipwreck because of a typhoon. He was granted his new surname (i.e. clan name) Nam (Hanja: 南氏) by Gyeongdeok of Silla because he was from Runan County (Hanja: 汝南), China.

== Joseon Royalty ==
=== Imperial Harem ===
- Royal Consort Gwi-in (귀인 남씨; 1467 – ?), consort of Seongjong of Joseon

=== Royalty ===
- Prince Consort Uisan (의산군), son-in-law of Taejong of Joseon, husband of Princess Jeongseon
- Princess Consort Nam (군부인 의령 남씨; 1426–?), primary consort of Grand Prince Imyeong
- Prince Consort Uicheon (의천위 남섭원), son-in-law Seongjong of Joseon, husband of Princess Heijeong
- Prince Consort Uiseong (의성위), son-in-law Seongjong of Joseon, husband of Yi Ok-hwan, Princess Gyeongsun
- Internal Princess Consort Dangseong (당성부부인 남양 홍씨; 1728–1791), mother of Empress Hyoui
- Internal Princess Consort Uichang (의창부부인 의령 남씨; 1859–1882) step-mother of Empress Sunmyeonghyo

== See also ==
- Korean clan names of foreign origin
