= Queen Sohŏn =

Queen of Joseon from 1418 to 1446

Queen Consort of Joseon
- Tenure: 18 September 1418 – 28 April 1446
- Predecessor: Queen Wongyeong
- Successor: Queen Jeongsun

Crown Princess of Joseon
- Tenure: 20 July – 18 September 1418
- Predecessor: Crown Princess Kim (Note: Wife of Grand Prince Yangnyeong.)
- Successor: Crown Princess Kim
- Born: 20 October 1395; Yangju-mok, Gyeonggi Province, Joseon
- Died: 28 April 1446 (aged 50); Hanseong, Joseon
- Burial: Yeongneung, Yeoju, South Korea
- Spouse: King Sejong (m. 1408)
- Issue Detail: 8 sons, 2 daughters
Posthumous name
- Queen Sonin Jesong Sohŏn (선인제성소헌왕후; 宣仁齊聖昭憲王后)
- Clan: Cheongsong Shim (by birth); Jeonju Yi (by marriage)
- Dynasty: Yi
- Father: Shim On, Internal Prince Cheongcheon
- Mother: Grand Princess Consort of Samhan State, of the Sunheung An clan
- Religion: Buddhism
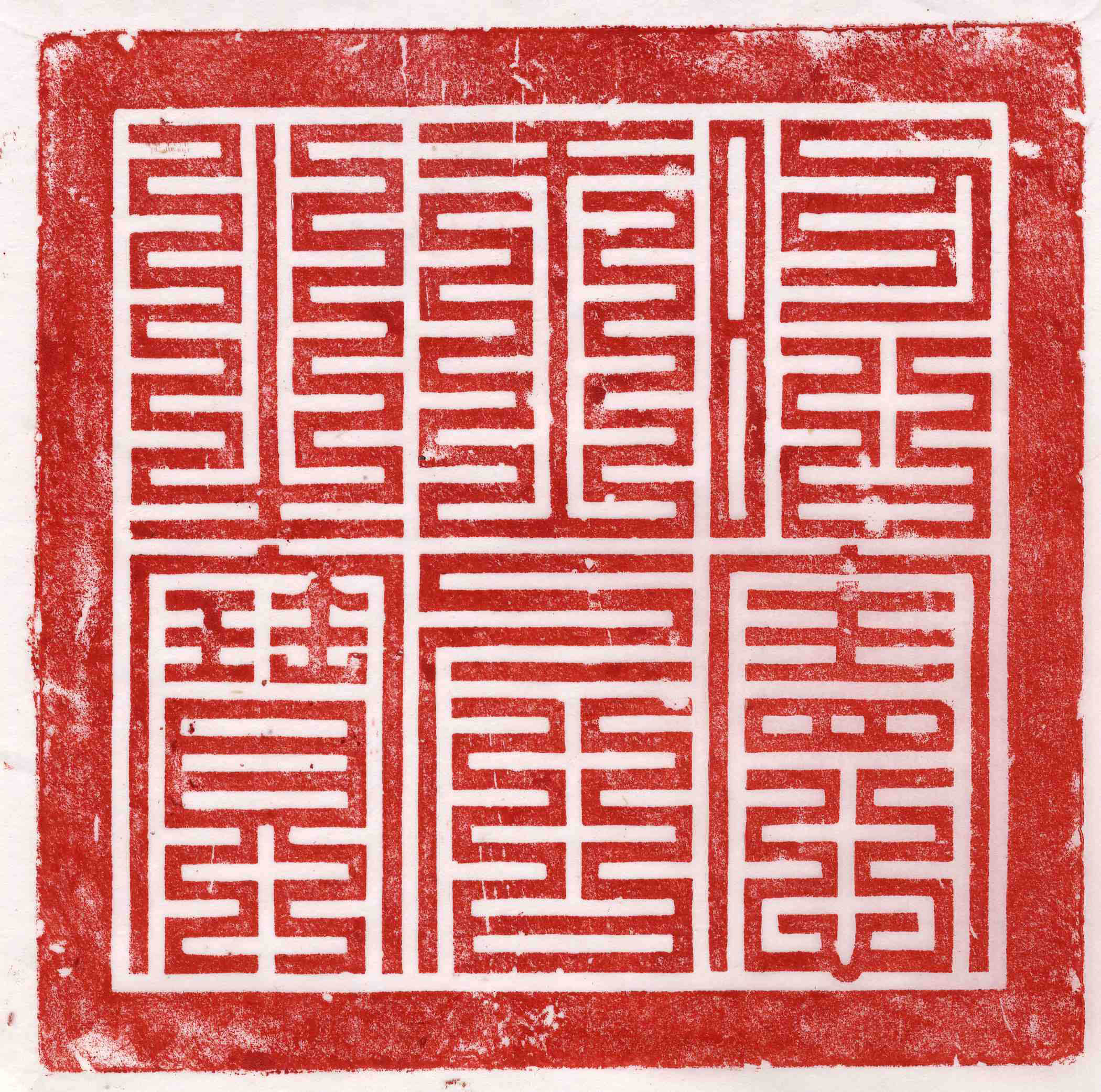
- Seal

Korean name
- Hangul: 소헌왕후
- Hanja: 昭憲王后
- RR: Soheon wanghu
- MR: Sohŏn wanghu

Queen Sohŏn (Korean: 소헌왕후; Hanja: 昭憲王后; 20 October 1395 – 28 April 1446), of the Cheongsong Shim clan, was the wife of Sejong the Great, the fourth monarch of Joseon, and the mother of King Munjong and King Sejo. Known as Queen Gong during her tenure, she was queen of Joseon from 1418 until her death in 1446.

== Biography ==
=== Early life and lineage ===
The future Queen Sohŏn was born during the reign of King Taejo, as the eldest child among five sons and six daughters; two of her younger brothers were of concubine birth. Her father was Shim On, who would later become chief state councilor, and her mother was a lady from the prestigious Sunheung An clan.

Her younger brother, Shim Hoe (심회), also served as chief state councilor, and became an ancestor of Queen Insun and Queen Danui.

Her paternal uncle, Shim Jong (심종), was King Taejong's brother-in-law through his marriage to the king's younger sister, Princess Gyeongseon (경선공주), while another paternal uncle, Shim Jeong (심정), had married a niece of King Gongyang of Goryeo.

=== Marriage ===
In 1408, at the age of 13, Lady Shim married 11-year-old Prince Chungnyeong, the third son of King Taejong and Queen Wongyeong. She might have been chosen as a royal bride due to her connection to Princess Gyeongseon.

In 1418, upon Prince Chungnyeong appointment as crown prince, Lady Shim became crown princess and received the honorific title gyeong (경; lit. ''respectful''). King Taejong abdicated shortly after and Lady Shim's husband acceded to the throne (posthumously King Sejong); she thus became queen and her honorific title was altered to gong (공; lit. ''courteous'').

She was described as having a gentle and kind appearance but advocating strict adherence to laws and code of conduct.

=== Family downfall ===
Like her predecessor and mother-in-law, Queen Wongyeong, Lady Shim also experienced the collapse of her natal family because King Taejong didn't tolerate powerful in-laws influencing politics. She lost her uncle Shim Jeong, and her father Shim On, in 1418 and 1419, respectively. Her mother and remaining relatives were demoted to the slave class, and it wasn't until 1426 that King Sejong restored their official status.

Court officials brought up the topic of deposing Lady Shim during the purge of her family, but King Sejong fought back, citing her contributions to the management of the family and the fact that she had already given birth to two princes and was again pregnant at the time.

Rather than holding resentment toward King Sejong, Lady Shim was understanding and supportive of her husband through the ordeal. It was said that the internal court was at its most peaceful during her tenure. King Sejong also praised her for being a good leader for the women of the palace.

=== Death ===
Lady Shim died at the age of 50, at the residence of her second son, Grand Prince Suyang. She was buried within Yeongneung (영릉) in present-day Yeoju, Gyeonggi Province. King Sejong, who survived Lady Shim by four years, was later buried alongside her.

=== Legacy ===
Grand Prince Suyang commissioned the creation of the Seokbosangjeol after his mother's death, intending it to ease her passage to the next life. It was, however, also made available to the general population, to encourage the propagation of the Buddhist faith. It was translated from Chinese to Korea's native hangul, and as such represents the oldest form of indigenous Korean written text. The book was written at King Sejong's request, and was first published in 24 volumes in 1447. An original edition is held in the National Library of Korea, and has been designated as a Tangible Cultural Treasure.

== Titles ==
- During the reign of King Taejo (r. 1392–1398):
  - Lady, of the Cheongsong Shim clan (청송 심씨; 靑松沈氏; from 20 October 1395)
    - Shim On's daughter (심온의 딸)
    - Lady Shim (심씨; 沈氏)
- During the reign of King Taejong (r. 1400–1418):
  - Mistress Gyeongsuk (경숙옹주; 敬淑翁主; from 23 March 1408)
  - Grand Princess Consort of Samhan State (삼한국대부인; 三韓國大夫人; from 2 November 1417)
  - Crown Princess Gyeong (경빈; 敬嬪; from 20 July 1418)
- During the reign of King Sejong (r. 1418–1450):
  - Queen Gong (공비; 恭妃; from 18 September 1418)
  - Queen (왕비; 王妃; from 17 June 1432) (Note: In 1432, the system of conferring honorific titles upon the queen and crown princess was abolished.)
  - Queen Sohŏn (소헌왕후; 昭憲王后; from 1446)

== Family ==
- Father: Shim On (심온), Internal Prince Cheongcheon (청천부원군; 1375 – 20 January 1419)
- Mother: Grand Princess Consort of Samhan State (삼한국대부인), of the Sunheung An clan (순흥 안씨; ?–1444)
- Sibling(s)
  - Lady, of the Cheongsong Shim clan (청송 심씨; 1397–?) (Note: Married Kang Seok-deok (강석덕), Internal Prince Jinyang (진양부원군; 1395–1459) from the Jinju Kang clan (진주 강씨); nephew-in-law of Princess Gyeonghwa. They had issue (2 sons).)
  - Lady, of the Cheongsong Shim clan (청송 심씨; 1399–?) (Note: Married No Mul-jae (노물재; 1396–1446) from the Gyoha No clan (교하 노씨); son of Right State Councilor No Han (노한; 1376–1443) and nephew of Queen Wongyeong. They had issue (1 son); among their descendants is the 6th president of South Korea, Roh Tae-woo.)
  - Lady, of the Cheongsong Shim clan (청송 심씨; 1401–?) (Note: Married Ryu Ja-hae (류자해) from the Jinju Ryu clan (진주 류씨); first cousin of Queen Jeonghui. They had issue (1 son); among their descendants is Ryu Sun-jong (grandson).)
  - Shim Jun (심준; 1405–1448) (Note: ▪︎Wife: Lady, of the Yeoheung Min clan (여흥 민씨; 1403–?); third daughter of Min Mu-hyul (민무휼), Prince Yeowon (여원군; 1373–1416) and niece of Queen Wongyeong. ▪︎Issue: 2 sons.)
  - Lady, of the Cheongsong Shim clan (청송 심씨; 1406–1466) (Note: Married Yi Sung-ji (이숭지; ?–1462) from the Jeonui Yi clan (전의 이씨).)
  - Shim Jang-su (심장수; 1408–?) (Note: Half-brother.)
  - Shim Jang-gi (심장기; 1409–?)
  - Lady, of the Cheongsong Shim clan (청송 심씨; 1413–?) (Note: Married Park Geo-so (박거소) from the Suncheon Park clan (순천 박씨). They had issue (2 sons); among their descendants are Park Won-jong (grandson), Queen Janggyeong and Yun Im (great-grandchildren).)
  - Shim Hoe (심회; 1418–1493) (Note: ▪︎Wife: Lady, of the Wonju Kim clan (원주 김씨); daughter of Kim Yeon-ji (김연지). ▪︎Issue: 3 sons; among his descendants are Queen Insun and Queen Danui.)
  - Shim Gyeol (심결; 1419–1470) (Note: ▪︎Wife: Lady, of Geochang Shin clan (거창 신씨); daughter of Shin Gi (신기), paternal aunt of Sugui Shin and first cousin once removed of Deposed Queen Shin. ▪︎Issue: 1 son.)
- Husband: King Sejong (세종대왕; 15 May 1397 – 8 April 1450)
  - Father-in-law: King Taejong (태종대왕; 21 June 1367 – 8 June 1422)
  - Mother-in-law: Queen Wongyeong (원경왕후), of the Yeoheung Min clan (여흥 민씨; 6 August 1365 – 27 August 1420)
- Issue
  - Princess Jeongso (정소공주; 1412 – 3 April 1424)
  - Yi Hyang (이향), King Munjong (문종대왕; 15 November 1414 – 10 June 1452)
  - Princess Jeongui (정의공주; 27 September 1415 – 5 March 1477) (Note: Married An Maeng-dam (안맹담), Prince Consort Yeonchang (연창위; 1415–1462) from the Juksan An clan (죽산 안씨); grandnephew of Consort Jeong and nephew of Consort Hyeon (현비 안씨; consort of King U of Goryeo). They had issue (4 sons, 2 daughters).)
  - Yi Yu (이유), King Sejo (세조대왕; 11 November 1417 – 23 October 1468)
  - Yi Yong (이용), Grand Prince Anpyeong (안평대군; 27 October 1418 – 27 November 1453)
  - Yi Gu (이구), Grand Prince Imyeong (임영대군; 29 January 1420 – 11 February 1469)
  - Yi Yo (이여), Grand Prince Gwangpyeong (광평대군; 28 May 1425 – 8 December 1444) (Note: ▪︎Wife: Grand Princess Consort Yeongga (영가부부인), of the Pyongsan Shin clan (평산 신씨); daughter of Shin Ja-su (신자수). ▪︎Issue: 1 son.)
  - Yi Yu (이유), Grand Prince Geumseong (금성대군; 14 May 1426 – 16 November 1457) (Note: ▪︎Wife: Grand Princess Consort Wansan (완산부부인), of the Jeonju Choe clan (전주 최씨); daughter of Choe Sa-gang (최사강; 1388–1443), grandaunt of Concubine Gong and great-aunt of Deposed Queen Shin. ▪︎Issue: 2 sons (1 concubine-born son).)
  - Yi Im (이임), Grand Prince Pyeongwon (평원대군; 15 December 1427 – 3 March 1445) (Note: ▪︎Wife: Grand Princess Consort Gangnyeong (강녕부부인), of the Namyang Hong clan (남양 홍씨); daughter of Hong I-yong (홍이용) and first cousin of Queen Insu. ▪︎Issue: 1 adopted son.)
  - Yi Yeom (이염), Grand Prince Yeongeung (영응대군; 1 June 1434 – 7 March 1467) (Note: ▪︎1st wife: Grand Princess Consort Daebang (대방부부인), of the Yeosan Song clan (여산 송씨); daughter of Song Bok-won (송복원) and aunt of Queen Jeongsun. ▪︎2nd wife: Grand Princess Consort Chunseong (춘성부부인), of the Haeju Jeong clan (해주 정씨); daughter of Jeong Chung-gyeong (정충경). ▪︎3rd wife: Grand Princess Consort Yeonseong (연성부부인), of the Yonan Kim clan (연안 김씨). ▪︎Issue: 1 son, 3 daughters.)

== Ancestry ==
Ancestors of Queen Sohŏn

Shim Yeon (심연)
Shim Ryong (심룡)
Shim Deok-bu (심덕부)
Lady, of the Kim clan (김씨)
Shim On, Internal Prince Cheongcheon (청천부원군 심온)
Mun Pil-dae (문필대)
Lady, of the Incheon Mun clan (인천 문씨)
Queen Sohŏn
An Cheon-bo (안천보)
Grand Princess Consort of Samhan State, of the Sunheung An clan (삼한국대부인 순흥 안씨)
Lady, of the Yeongju Kim clan (영주 김씨)

== In popular culture ==
- Portrayed by Sunwoo Yong-nyeo in the 1973 KBS TV series Great King Sejong.
- Portrayed by Kim Young-ae in the 1983 MBC TV series 500 Years of Joseon: Tree with Deep Roots.
- Portrayed by Lim Seo-yeon in the 1996–1998 KBS1 TV series Tears of the Dragon.
- Portrayed by Nam Ji-hyun and Lee Yoon-ji in the 2008 KBS TV series The Great King, Sejong.
- Portrayed by Jang Ji-eun in the 2011 SBS TV series Deep Rooted Tree.
- Portrayed by Jin Ki-joo in the 2015 MBC TV series Splash Splash Love.
- Inspired a fictional queen portrayed by Yang Mi-kyung in the 2018 TV Chosun TV series Grand Prince.
- Portrayed by Jeon Mi-seon in the 2019 film The King's Letters.
- Portrayed by Kim Bi-ju in the 2021–2022 KBS1 TV series The King of Tears, Lee Bang-won.

== See also ==
- History of Korea
- Consort kin
- Politics of Joseon
- Styles and titles in Joseon

== Notes ==
Queen Sohŏn Cheongseong Shim clan
Royal titles
Preceded by Queen Wongyeong of the Yeoheung Min clan	Queen Consort of Joseon; 1418–1446	Succeeded by Queen Jeongsun of the Yeosan Song clan
