= Sim On =

Korean politician (1375–1419)

Shim On 심온

Chief State Councillor
- In office 2 October 1418 – 2 January 1419
- Preceded by: Han Sang-gyeong
- Succeeded by: Ryu Jeong-hyeon

Personal details
- Born: 1375
- Died: 18 January 1419 (aged 43–44)

Korean name
- Hangul: 심온
- Hanja: 沈溫
- RR: Sim On
- MR: Sim On

Sim On (Korean: 심온; Hanja: 沈溫; 1375 – 18 January 1419) was a Korean politician. He was the Chief State Councillor of the Korean Joseon from September 1418 to December 1418 and the father of Queen Soheon and father-in-law to King Sejong. His treason charges eventually led to his death and the further strengthening of the royal power.

== Background ==
Sim On was born into the Cheongsong Shim clan (靑松 沈氏) in the late Goryeo period. His father, Sim Tŏk-bu, participated in the Wihwado retreat alongside General Yi Sŏng-gye and later became a merit subject (개국공신; 開國功臣; lit. founding contributor) of the newly founded Joseon dynasty. Sim On passed the lower literary examination of gwageo in 1386 at the age of 12, though records of his government service only appear after Joseon's establishment in 1392.

In 1411, during King Taejong's reign, Sim was appointed to govern the province of Hamgyong-do. He steadily rose through the ranks and served as Minister of Industry, Civil Affairs and Agriculture. When the court began selecting candidates for the princess consort of Prince Chungnyeong, he included his daughter, resulting in her selection.

When Chungnyeong ascended the throne in 1418, Sim's daughter, Lady Sim (심씨; 沈氏), (Note: Women were referred to only by their family names.) became Queen Soheon, and Sim was appointed to the highest civil position in the royal court, Chief State Councilor.

== Scandal and demise ==
When Sim On was appointed as Chief State Councilor, Park Eun (박은; 朴訔) of the Bannam Park clan was Left State Councilor. Their relationship was hostile, and there were frequent disputes between them.

Meanwhile, Taejong had abdicated and become king emeritus (상왕; 上王), although he still retained significant power, with important decisions still requiring his approval. Since the founding of Joseon, Taejong had frequently clashed with scholar-officials like Chŏng To-jŏn over the governance of the new dynasty. Taejong believed the king should be the sole authority of the kingdom and worked to curb the influence of powerful clans.

Despite Taejong's decree to retain military authority as king emeritus, controversy erupted when Vice Minister of Military Affairs Kang Sang-in and other officials reported military-related matters directly to Sejong. Taejong responded by reprimanding officials from the Ministry of Military Affairs who defied his authority. This incident occurred approximately 10 days before Shim On was scheduled to leave for the Ming Empire as an emissary.

In the aftermath, many officials from the Ministry of Military Affairs, including Kang Sang-in and Minister Park Seup, were imprisoned. Taejong took an active role in handling the case. After a few days of interrogation, Kang Sang-in was pardoned due to his status as a merit subject of the kingdom's founding and was sent back to his hometown. The Ministry of Military Affairs was subsequently instructed to report all military matters to Taejong before anyone else. Although the Censorate wanted Park Seup and Kang Sang-in to face severe punishment, the case seemed to end with Kang Sang-in being demoted.

However, about two months later, Taejong reopened the case and summoned those involved again. New suspects were identified, including Sim Jeong, the brother of Sim On. Sim On was accused of being the ringleader. According to Park Seup's confession, Sim On, Kang Sang-in, and others had discussed splitting military authority was impossible, which led to reporting directly to Sejong.

Sim On was arrested in Uiju on his way back from the Ming Empire as emissary and taken under custody to the capital Hanyang, then to Suwon. In Suwon, he was tortured into admitting to his crimes and was forced to drink poison to death.

== Aftermath ==
After Sim On was executed for his fabricated crimes, Park Eun was promoted to Chief State Councilor. Many of the Sim family were condemned, and even the Queen Soheon was threatened to be stripped of her title as queen. However, King Sejong tried to protect her, and succeeded. King Taejong also supported Queen Soheon, telling the minister not to mention the matter of stripping Queen Soheon's title.

However, Sim's name became a taboo during the remainder of Taejong's presence. Even Sejong could not regain the dignity of the minister's name. However, when Sejong and Queen Soheon's son King Munjong rose to the throne, Shim-On was absolved of his crimes, and posthumously reinstated to the office of Chief State Councilor. He was also made a lord, and is also known as Lord of Anhyo (안효공; 安孝公).

The Shim family continued to prosper, with Sim-On's second son Sim Hwe becoming Chief State Councilor during King Sejo's reign.

== Controversy ==
700 years after the incident, the Sim and Park families have still not reconciled about the incident, with the Sim family blaming Park Eun for the framing about treason. However, historians generally agree that Park was merely a tool in Taejong's master plan of royal totalitarianism. As Taejong was a conservative king, he did not want a queen's family gaining power and influence over the Joseon Dynasty. As his mindset was educated in the Goryeo Dynasty, he had come to believe in the danger of handing over power to another, non-royal family. With Sim On's political power and social influence that stem from his family's influence, along with his family's revered lineage (The Sim family is one of the direct descendants of king Wen of Zhou dynasty), Taejong became convinced that Sim On must be eliminated for the sake of his son Sejong's future reign.

== Family ==
- Father: Sim Deok-bu (심덕부), Count Cheongseong (청성백)
- Mother: Lady Mun of Incheon Mun clan (인천 문씨), daughter of Mun Pildae ( 문필대)
- Wife:
  - Internal Princess Consort Samhanguk of the Sunheung Ahn clan (삼한국대부인 순흥 안씨; ? – 1444), daughter of Ahn Cheon-Bo (안천보)
    - Daughter: Queen Soheon of Cheongseong Sim clan (1395–1446)
      - Son-in-law: King Sejong of Joseon (1397–1450)
    - Daughter: Lady Sim of the Cheongsong Sim clan (청송 심씨; 1397–?)
    - Daughter: Lady Sim of the Cheongsong Sim clan (청송 심씨; 1399 – ?)
    - Daughter: Lady Sim of the Cheongsong Sim clan (청송 심씨; 1401 – ?)
    - Son: Sim Jun (심준; 1405–1448)
    - Daughter: Lady Sim of the Cheongsong Sim clan (청송 심씨; 1406–1466)
    - Daughter: Lady Sim of the Cheongsong Sim clan (청송 심씨; 1413 – ?)
    - Son: Sim Hoe (심회; 沈澮; 1418–1493)
    - Son: Sim Gyeol (심결; 沈決; 1419–1470)
  - Unknown:
    - Son: Sim Jang-su (심장수; 沈長壽; 1408 – ?)
    - Son: Sim Jang-gi (심장기; 沈長己; 1409 – ?)

== In popular culture ==
- Portrayed by Choi Sang-hoon in the 2008 KBS2 TV series The Great King, Sejong.
- Portrayed by Han In-soo in the 2011 SBS TV series Deep Rooted Tree.
- Portrayed by Jung Kyu-soo in the 2015 MBC TV series Splash Splash Love.
