= Grand Prince Imyŏng =

Imperial prince of the Joseon dynasty

Yi Ku 이구
- Grand Prince Imyŏng
- Born: 7 January 1420; Hanseong, Joseon
- Died: 21 January 1469 (aged 49); Hanseong, Joseon
- Burial: Naeseon-dong, Uiwang, Gyeonggi Province, South Korea
- Spouse: Princess Consort Jean of the Jeonju Choi clan Princess Consort Ahn; Princess Consort Nam
- Issue: 9 sons and 5 daughters
- House: Jeonju Yi
- Father: Sejong the Great
- Mother: Queen Soheon of the Cheongsong Sim clan
- Religion: Confucianism

Yi Ku (Korean: 이구; 7 January 1420 – 21 January 1469), formally known as Grand Prince Imyŏng (Korean: 임영대군), was an imperial prince of the Joseon dynasty. He was the fourth son of King Sejong. His brothers were King Munjong of Joseon and King Sejo of Joseon.

== Biography ==
Yi Ku was born as the 4th son and 6th child of King Sejong and his wife, Queen Soheon.

From an early age, he was proud and kept a filial attitude to his parents and siblings. When he was a child, he was praised for being sincere. His father, King Sejong was very fond of him.

Like his second older brother, Grand Prince Suyang, he was proficient in martial arts, but he also created a scandal due to having sexual intercourse with court ladies and maids of the palace.

Yi Ku firstly married Princess Consort Nam, but after a month of marriage, their marriage became problematic. Despite the relationship, a son was born. But this led to the Grand Prince to marry Lady Choi of the Jeonju Choi clan, later being titled as Princess Consort Jean, as his second wife and later marry Princess Consort Ahn of the Andong Ahn clan as his third wife. Both marriages produced 5 daughters and 8 sons. He also had a concubine but no issue was born from the relationship.

In 1440, at the age of 20, the Grand Prince became the Yeonguijeong.

During the Gyeyujeong Rebellion, when Grand Prince Suyang fought for the throne against their nephew, King Danjong, Yi Ku supported and helped Grand Prince Suyang. Prince Imyŏng greatly assisted Grand Prince Suyang and contributed to the enthronement of his brother as King Sejo in 1453.

Yi Ku died on January 21, 1469. He was buried in what is now Uiwang, Gyeonggi Province.

== Family ==
Parents

- Father: Sejong the Great of Joseon (세종대왕; 15 May 1397 – 8 April 1450)
- Mother: Queen Soheon of the Cheongsong Sim clan (소헌왕후 심씨; 12 October 1395 – 19 April 1446)
  - Older sister: Princess Jeongso (정소공주; 1412–1424)
  - Older brother: Yi Hyang, King Munjong (왕세자 향; 15 November 1414 – 1 June 1452)
  - Older sister: Princess Jeongui (정의공주; 1415 – 11 February 1477)
  - Older brother: Yi Yu, King Sejo (이유 수양대군; 2 November 1417 – 23 September 1468)
  - Older brother: Yi Yong, Grand Prince Anpyeong (이용 안평대군; 18 October 1418 – 18 November 1453)
  - Younger brother: Yi Yeo, Grand Prince Gwangpyeong (이여 광평대군; 2 May 1425 – 7 December 1444)
  - Younger brother: Yi Yu, Grand Prince Geumseong (이유 금성대군; 5 May 1426 – 7 November 1457)
  - Younger brother: Yi Im, Grand Prince Pyeongwon (이임 평원대군; 18 November 1427 – 16 January 1445)
  - Younger brother: Yi Yeom, Grand Prince Yeongeung (이염 영응대군; 23 May 1434 – 2 February 1467)

Consorts and issues

- Princess Consort Nam of the Uiryeong Nam clan (군부인 의령 남씨; 1426–?); second daughter of Nam Ji (남지, 南智; 1392–1454)
- Princess Consort Jean of the Jeonju Choi clan (제안부부인 전주 최씨; 1420–?); daughter of Choi Seung-ryeong (최승령, 崔承寧; 1405–1445)
  - First Daughter: Princess Jungmo (중모현주; 1435–?)
  - First Son: Yi Ju, Prince Ohsan (이주 오산군; 1437–1489)
  - Second Son: Yi Jun, Prince Gwiseong (이준 귀성군; 20 January 1441 – 28 January 1479)
  - Second Daughter: Princess Cheongha (청하현주; 1448–?)
  - Third Son: Yi Sun, Prince Jeongyang (이순 정양군; 1453–1492)
  - Fourth Son: Yi Jeong, Prince Palgye (이정 팔계군; 1454–?)
  - Fifth Son: Yi Jing, Prince Hwanseong (이징 환성군; 1456–?)
- Princess Consort Ahn of the Andong Ahn clan (부부인 안동 안씨; 1422–?)
  - Third Daughter: Princess Yi of the Jeonju Yi clan (전주이씨; 1456–?)
  - Sixth Son: Yi Ham, Prince Yeongyang (이함 영양군; 1458–1526)
  - Fourth Daughter: Princess Yi of the Jeonju Yi clan (전주이씨; 1458–?)
  - Seventh Son: Yi Rin, Dangyebujeong (이린 단계부정; 1460–1521)
  - Eighth Son: Yi Tak, Prince Yunsan (이탁 윤산군; 1461–1547)
  - Ninth Son: Yi Ok, Prince Okcheon (이옥 옥천군; 1464–?)
  - Fifth Daughter: Princess Yi of the Jeonju Yi clan (전주이씨)
  - Sixth Daughter: Princess Yi of the Jeonju Yi clan (전주이씨)
- Concubine Geum Gang-mae (첩 금강매; 1430–?)

== See also ==
- Styles and titles in the Joseon dynasty
- Gungnyeo
