= Geochang Shin clan =

Korean clan from South Gyeongsang Province

- Country: Korea
- Current region: Geochang County
- Founder: Shin Su
- Connected members: Yozoh; Shin Dalja; Royal Consort Suk-ui; Queen Jeinwondeok; Queen Dangyeong
- Website: http://www.geochangshin.com/

Geochang Shin clan (Korean: 거창 신씨; Hanja: 居昌 愼氏) is a Korean clan. Their Bon-gwan is in Geochang County, South Gyeongsang Province. In a 2015 survey, the Geochang Shin clan was reported to have 51,153 members. The clan's founder was Shin Su, who came from Kaifeng during the Song dynasty. He was naturalized in Goryeo during Munjong of Goryeo's reign.

== Royalty of the Joseon dynasty ==
- Queen Jeinwondeok (제인원덕왕비), wife of Yeonsangun of Joseon
- Queen Dangyeong (단경왕후), wife of Jungjong of Joseon
- Princess Consort Ikchang (익창군부인), consort of Yi Hui, Prince Haean
- Royal Consort Su-gui Shin (숙의 신씨), concubine of Crown Prince Uigyeong
- Royal Consort Gwi-in Shin (귀인 신씨), concubine of Myeongjong of Joseon

== Generation Names ==
○Generation	26	27	28	29	30	31	32	33
Character	필◻(必, pil)	◻구(九, gu)	병◻(炳, byeong)	◻종(宗, jong)	◻성(晟, seong)	◻범(範, beom)	용◻(鏞, yong)	◻재(縡, jae)
○Generation	34	35	36	37	38	39	40	41
Character	중◻(重, jung)	◻규(揆, gyu)	◻택(澤, taek)	상◻(相, sang)	◻환(煥, hwan)	기◻(基, gi)	◻호(鎬, ho)	영◻(泳, yeong)
○Generation	42	43	44	45	46	47	48	49
Character	◻근(根, geun)	연◻(然, yeon)	◻규(圭, gyu)	현◻(鉉, hyeon)	◻원(源, won)	동◻(東, dong)	◻영(榮, yeong)	재◻(載, jae)

== See also ==
- Korean clan names of foreign origin
