= Sunheung An clan =

Korean clan in North Gyeongsang Province

Sunheung An clan 순흥안씨
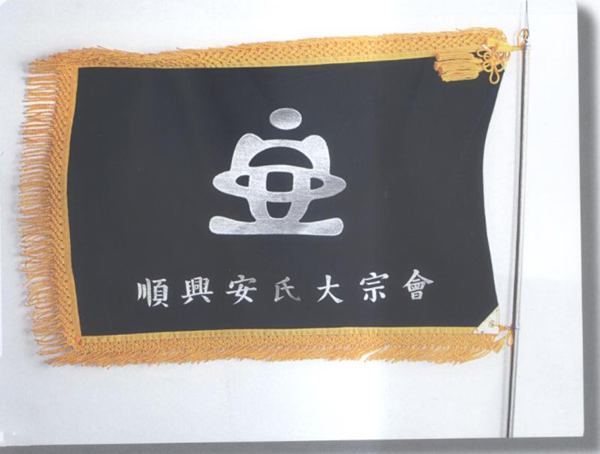
- The crest of the Sunheung Ahn clan
- Home province: North Gyeongsang
- Titles: Various
- Founder: Ahn Ja-mi

The Sunheung Ahn clan (Korean: 순흥 안씨, Korean pronunciation: [sunhɯ̽ŋ ans͈i]) is a clan connected with the town of Sunheung, South Korea, and was well known during the Goryeo Dynasty and in the early Joseon Dynasty for its so-called "blue-blood" status.

73.5% of people with the Korean surname 'Ahn' belong to the Sunheung Ahn clan. The 2000 South Korean census counted 468,827 members of the "Sunheung" Ahn clan.

== Sunheung clan in the Goryeo Dynasty ==
They have enjoyed "blue-blood" status as nobility (Yangban) since their earliest history in the Goryeo Dynasty and throughout the Joseon Dynasty.

The founder of the Sunheung Ahn was a famous military commander from Goryeo named Ahn Ja-mi. He commanded the Hongwiwi, a troop that escorted the Royal Family, greeted foreign envoys, participated in national ceremonies, fought in wars, and guarded the frontier (border area) during the Goryeo Dynasty. Ahn Ja-mi was honoured with the title of the Supreme Commander of Samhowi (one of the three Central Commanderies) by King Sinjong of Goryeo.

Ahn Ja-mi had three sons: Ahn Yeong-yu, Ahn Yeong-rin and Ahn Yeong-hwa. The Sunheung Ahn clan is divided into three different branches, based on which of the three sons they descend from. The First Branch descending from Ahn Yeong-yu is called Chumil Branch (추밀공파; 樞密公派). The Second Branch descending from Ahn Yeong-rin is called Byeoljang Branch (별장공파, 別將公派). The Third Branch descending from Ahn Yeong-hwa is called Kyoseo Branch (교서공파, 校書公派). From these three branches, there are 14 more sub-branches from the First Branch, 4 sub-branches from the Second Branch, and 4 sub-branches from the Third Branch.

The Sunheung Ahn clan became one of the most powerful and famous noble clans after Ahn Hyang, a grandson of Ahn Yeong-yu, passed the Gwageo (State examination) in 1260, and served as Docheomuijungchan (Deputy Prime Minister). Ahn Hyang is considered the founder of Neo-Confucianism in Korea, introducing Song Confucianism to the Goryeo Empire, and is generally numbered among the clan's most illustrious members. He founded a branch of his own within the Sunheung Ahn clan, called Moonsun Sub-Branch (문성공파, 文成公派).

Subsequent to Ahn Hyang, and for the rest of the Goryeo Dynasty, the Sunheung Ahn clan had members passing the State Examination for 11 generations, 20 members of the clan were made into Dukes or Grand Dukes (봉군, 封君), and it produced 17 Daejehak (대제학), which was the highest office a scholar could reach in the Royal Court, roughly equivalent to today's Ministers of Education.

== Sunheung clan in the Joseon Dynasty ==
After the fall of Goryeo and the establishment of Joseon in 1392, the Sunheung Ahn clan still remained one of the most powerful and famous noble families, and was known for being one of the Six Greatest Clans in the Kingdom. During the Joseon Dynasty, 641 members of the clan passed the State Examination.

However, the Sunheung Ahn clan lost its power in the mid-15th Century, due to its support of King Danjong, a young monarch who was overthrown (and later assassinated) by his uncle in the midst of political turmoil. The clan then led the movement to restore Danjong back to the throne, which is one of the well-known tragedies in the history of the Joseon Dynasty. Once the plan failed, the Sunheung Ahn clan lost its status as one of the most prestigious clans. Its members left Sunheung and scattered around the Kingdom, in order to run away from the oppression of the government.

The famous Pikkeut Village (End of the Blood Village, 피끝마을) gained its name after blood from the massacre of 700 inhabitants of Sunheung flowed in the water stream and swept into the village. In the Danjong-aesa (단종애사, 端宗哀史), a popular early 20th Century novel that describes the life of King Danjong, this event was romanticised as the tragic fate of the Sunheung Ahn clan, which stayed loyal to the young King.

Due to the clan's famous history of staying loyal to King Danjong, the surname Ahn became synonymous with stubborn and loyal. There are three Korean surnames often associated with being stubborn–Ahn, Kang, and Choi - and of the three, Ahn is the most famous.

As a consequence of the failure of Danjong's restoration, the Sunheung Ahn clan was charged with treason. Their ancestral seat was called the "Land of Treason", and the clan could not regain its former power and glory and did not produce many famous figures for the rest of the Joseon Dynasty. However, it produced many well-known members after the fall of Joseon, in late 19th Century.

== Notable members of the Sunheung clan ==
The most influential and respected members of the Sunheung Clan are Ahn Hyang, who is considered the founder of Neo-Confucianism in Korea, and Ahn Chang-ho, also known by his pen name Dosan (도산, 島山), a political leader during Colonial Japan and the sixth president of the Provisional Government of the Republic of Korea, whose life ended shortly after being released from prison by the Japanese Government.

=== Before the 26th generation ===
- Ahn Hyang, a scholar and official during the late Goryeo Dynasty. He introduced Neo-Confucianism to Korea.
- Ahn Yui, a military officer, who lived in mid-Joseon Dynasty. He is well known for winning against the Japanese in multiple battles, under the command of Yi Sun-sin, one of the most famous admirals in history.

=== 26th generation ===
- Ahn Cheol-soo, a South Korean politician, physician and software entrepreneur. A two-time former presidential election candidate, in 2012 and 2017. (26th generation of Lord Gamchal Sub-Branch of the First Branch of the Sunheung Ahn clan)
- Ahn Chang-ho, a leader of the Korean Independence Movement during the Japanese Occupation. Also one of the leaders of the Korean-American immigrant community in the United States.

=== 28th generation ===
- Ahn Jae-hong, a Korean independence activist, politician and journalist.

=== 29th generation ===
- Ahn Hee-jung, a South Korean politician. He served as the 36th and 37th Governor of South Chungcheong Province.
- Ahn Tae-hoon, the father of famous Korean independence activist Ahn Jung-geun. He is well known for helping Kim Gu, one of the leading figures of the Korean Independence Movement.

=== 30th generation ===
- Ahn Jung-geun, a Korean-independence activist and receiver of the Order of Merit Medal for National Foundation in 1962, the most prestigious civil decoration in the Republic of Korea.
- Ahn Gong-gun, younger brother of Ahn Jung-geun, a Korean-independence activist who worked along with Kim Gu.
- Ahn Myeong-gun, a cousin of Ahn Jung-geun, a Korean-independence activist who was imprisoned along with Kim Gu, by the Japanese Colonial Government.

=== 31st generation ===
- Ahn Bong-soon, a Korean-independence activist and Korean Liberation Army soldier
- Ahn Choon-seng, a Korean-independence activist, military commander, and South Korean politician. He later became the first Principal of the Korean Military Academy. Nephew of Ahn Jung-geun.

=== Generation ambiguous ===
- Ahn Eak-tai, South Korean classical composer and conductor
- An Yu-jin, South Korean singer, member of girl group Ive
- Ahn Jae-mo, South Korean actor, singer, motor sportsman and businessman
- Ahn Jae-wook, South Korean singer and actor
- Ahn Jae-hyo, South Korean singer and member of boy band Block B
- Ahn Sung-ki, South Korean actor
- Ahn Nae-sang, South Korean actor
- Viktor An (born Ahn Hyun-soo), South Korean-born short-track speed-skater, later naturalised into Russian citizenship
- Ahn So-hee, South Korean actress and singer, former member of girl group Wonder Girls
- Ahn Hye-jin (better known as Hwasa), South Korean singer and member of girl group Mamamoo
- Tony Ahn, South Korean singer and member of boy band H.O.T.
- Ahn Gwi-ryeong, South Korean politician
- Ahn Yeon Seok known as Yoo YeonSeok. South Korean actor and singer

== Villages of the Sunheung clan ==
- Songcheon, Hwaseong-myeon, Yeonbaek County, Hwanghae Province, North Korea
- Around Shinanju-myeon, Anju, South Pyongan Province, North Korea
- Hajeong, Baeksan-myeon, Gimje, North Jeolla Province, South Korea
- Jambyeong, Geumga-myeon, Chungju, South Chungcheong Province, South Korea
- Nusan-Ri, Yangchon-eup, Gimposi, Gyeonggi Province, South Korea
