= Sejo of Joseon =

King of Joseon from 1455 to 1468

Sejo
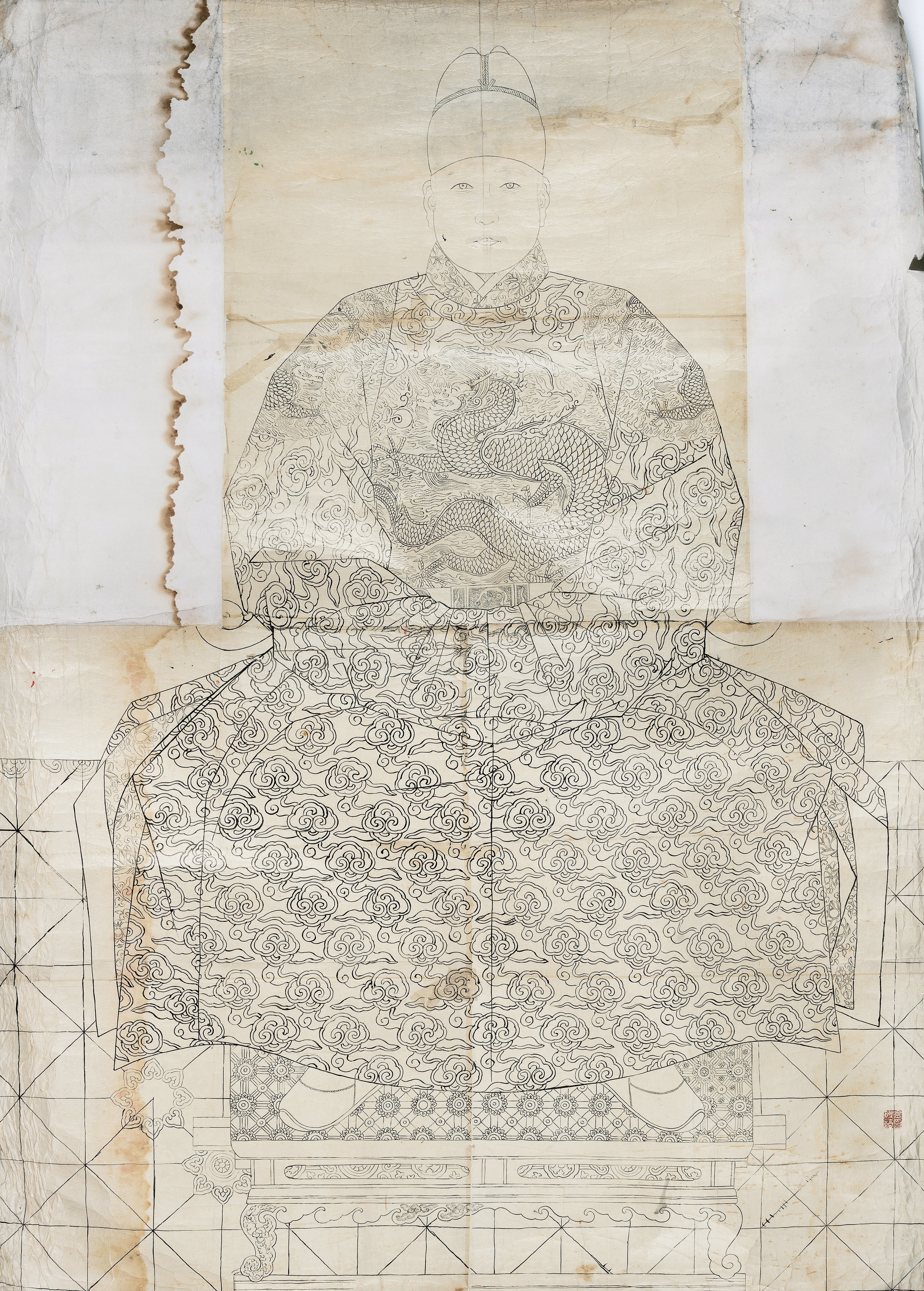
- Unfinished reproduction of a state portrait, c. 1927

King Emeritus of Joseon
- Tenure: 1 – 2 October 1468
- Predecessor: Danjong
- Successor: None

King of Joseon
- Reign: 4 July 1455 – 1 October 1468
- Enthronement: 3 August 1455; Geunjeongjeon, Gyeongbokgung
- Predecessor: Danjong
- Successor: Yejong

Chief State Councilor
- In Office: 20 November 1453 – 4 July 1455
- Predecessor: Hwangbo In
- Successor: Chŏng Inji
- Monarch: Danjong
- Born: 11 November 1417; Hanseong, Joseon
- Died: 2 October 1468 (aged 50); Suganggung, Hanseong, Joseon
- Burial: Gwangneung, Namyangju, South Korea
- Spouse: Queen Jeonghui (m. 1428)
- Issue Detail: Crown Prince Ŭigyŏng; Yejong of Joseon
Names
- Yi Yu (이유; 李瑈)
Era dates
- Adopted the era name of the Ming dynasty (Note: Gyeongtae (Jingtai) (경태; 景泰): 1455–1457 Cheonsun (Tianshun) (천순; 天順): 1457–1464 Seonghwa (Chenghua) (성화; 成化): 1465–1468)
Regnal name
- Seungcheon Chedo Yeolmun Yeongmu (승천체도열문영무; 承天體道烈文英武) (Note: Known as honorific name (존호; 尊號) in the Sinosphere, its closest equivalent in the English-speaking world is the regnal name.)
Posthumous name
- Joseon: Great King Hyejang Jideok Yunggong Seongsin Myeongye Heumsuk Inhyo (혜장지덕융공성신명예흠숙인효대왕; 惠莊至德隆功聖神明睿欽肅仁孝大王); Ming dynasty: Hyejang (혜장; 惠莊)
Temple name
- Sejo (세조; 世祖)
- Clan: Jeonju Yi
- Dynasty: Yi
- Father: King Sejong
- Mother: Queen Soheon
- Religion: Confucianism (Neo-Confucianism) → Buddhism
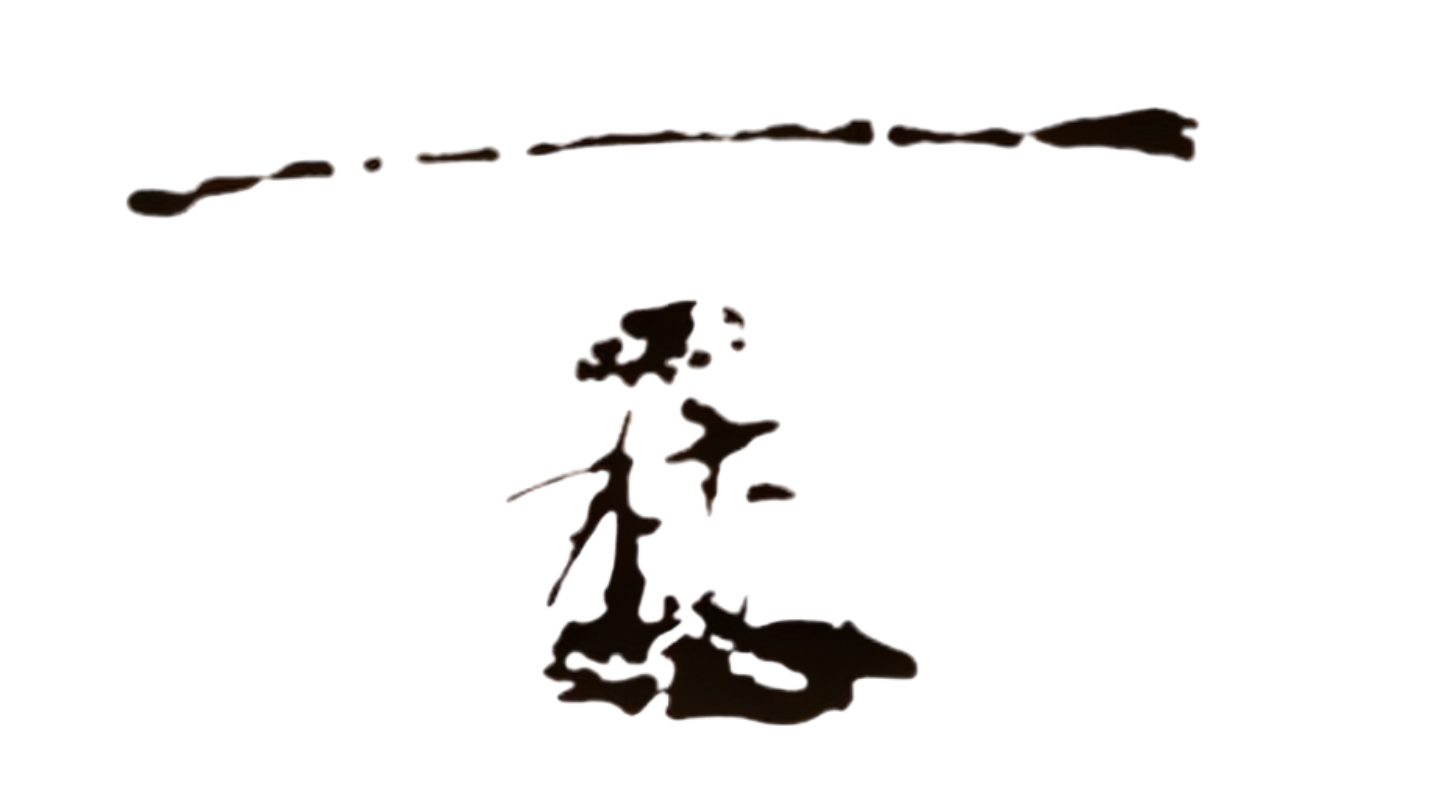
- Signature

Korean name
- Hangul: 세조
- Hanja: 世祖
- Lit.: "Generational Progenitor"
- RR: Sejo
- MR: Sejo

Royal title
- Hangul: 수양대군
- Hanja: 首陽大君 (Note: From 1445 to 1455. Previously, Grand Prince Jinpyeong (진평대군; 晉平大君) from 1428 to 1433; Grand Prince Hampyeong (함평대군; 咸平大君) in 1433; and Grand Prince Jinyang (진양대군; 晉陽大君) from 1433 to 1445.)
- RR: Suyang daegun
- MR: Suyang taegun

Courtesy name
- Hangul: 수지
- Hanja: 粹之
- RR: Suji
- MR: Suji

Sejo (Korean: 세조; Hanja: 世祖; 11 November 1417 – 2 October 1468), (Note: In the Korean calendar (lunisolar), he was born on the 24th day of the 9th lunar month and died on the 8th day of the 9th lunar month.) personal name Yi Yu, sometimes known as Grand Prince Suyang, was the seventh monarch of Joseon. He was the second son of Sejong the Great and the uncle of King Danjong, whom he forced to abdicate in 1455, after having previously led a coup d'état against him two years earlier. In his quest to seize throne, he ruthlessly killed rivals, including his younger brothers, Grand Prince Anpyeong and Grand Prince Geumseong, and his subsequent overly generous treatment toward old supporters unwittingly weakened royal power, paving the way for the rise of royal in-laws and the political instability that began in the late 15th century and stretched until the late 17th century. However, during his reign, he reformed the administration, led campaigns against the Jurchens, revised land laws, promoted literature and established court music. His Kyŏngguk Taejŏn (State Code) became Joseon's foundational legal framework.

== Biography ==
=== Early life ===
Born on 11 November 1417 as the fourth child and second son of Grand Prince Chungnyeong (future King Sejong) by his primary wife, Grand Princess Consort of Samhan State (future Queen Soheon), he showed great ability at archery, horse riding and martial arts, and was also a brilliant military commander, though he never went to the battlefront himself. He also possessed musical talent, which delighted his father, who claimed that the prince could achieve many great things if he put his mind to it.

On 6 June 1428, during King Sejong’s 10th year of reign, he received the title Grand Prince Jinpyeong. That same year on 13 October, he married Lady Yun (the future Queen Jeonghui), the youngest daughter of Yun Beon who was Deputy Director of Military Armaments.

On 27 June 1433, his title changed to Grand Prince Hampyeong, but Grand Prince Hamheung was alternately used as well. On 1 July, his title changed again to Grand Prince Jinyang as there were concerns of the previous title being confused with Hampyeong-hyeon in Jeolla Province.

In 1445, his title was lastly changed to Grand Prince Suyang, by which he is commonly known as.

=== Rise to power ===
Following the death of King Sejong in 1450, Suyang's ill brother, Yi Hyang (later known as King Munjong), took the throne but died two years later, and the crown passed to his 12-year-old son, Yi Hongwi (posthumously named King Danjong). The new monarch was too young to rule the nation, and the government was controlled by Chief State Councilor Hwangbo In and General Kim Chongsŏ, who was the Left State Councilor. As Kim Chongsŏ and his faction used the chance to extend the power of court officials against royal family members, the tension between him and Suyang greatly increased. Both Suyang and his younger brother, Grand Prince Anpyeong, sought opportunities to take control of the country.

In order to court the support of the Ming dynasty, Suyang became an ambassador in 1452. He also surrounded himself with trusted allies, including his famous tactician, Han Myŏnghoe, who advised him to take over the government in a coup. In 1453, Suyang killed Kim Chongsŏ and his faction, thereby taking the reins of power into his own hands. After the coup, he arrested his younger brother, Grand Prince Anpyeong, first sending him into exile, then sentencing him to death.

=== Reign ===
Finally, in 1455 Suyang forced the powerless king to abdicate, declaring himself the new ruler of Joseon (today known by the temple name "Sejo").

After his younger brother Grand Prince Geumsung, and six scholars, including Sŏng Sammun, Pak P'aengnyŏn and Yi Kae, plotted to remove him from power in an attempt to put his nephew back on the throne, Suyang demoted the former king Danjong from "King Emeritus" (Sangwang, 상왕, 上王) to "Prince Nosan" (Nosan-gun, 노산군, 魯山君) and later ordered him to commit suicide by poison.

Despite having snatched the throne from his young nephew and killing many people in the process, Sejo proved himself one of the ablest rulers and administrators in Korean history. First, he continued King Taejong's legacy of strengthening the monarchy by weakening the power of the State Council and bringing the officials directly under the king's control. He also further developed the administrative system, which had also been introduced by Taejong, enabling the government to determine exact population numbers and to mobilize troops effectively (this caused Yi Si-ae's Rebellion, which he suppressed). Just like Taejong, Sejo was a hardliner concerning foreign policy and attacked the Jurchens on the northern front in 1460 (오랑캐; 兀良哈) and 1467 (호리개; 胡里改). He also revised the land ordinance to improve the national economy and encouraged the publication of history, economy, agriculture, and religion books.

Sejo himself compiled a number of books based on his interests. One of them is Seokbosangjeol, a biography of Gautama Buddha. The others are Worinseokbo (월인석보; 月印釋譜) and Yeokdaebyeongyo (역대병요; 歷代兵要). One of his crowning achievements was the cultural progress Joseon made during his reign, such as the establishment of Jongmyo court music. His father, King Sejong, had always wanted to use Korean music rather than Chinese music for ancestral ritual, but conservative court officials thought that Chinese music was far superior to Korean music and stopped Sejong's efforts. However, when King Sejo rose to the throne, he modified the ritual music composed by his father and used it for royal ancestral rituals, which is now inscribed as a UNESCO Intangible Cultural Heritage for Humanity.

Most importantly, he compiled the State Code, which became the cornerstone of dynastic administration and provided the first form of written constitutional law in Korea.

=== Death ===
Sejo died in 1468, and the throne passed to his sickly third son, Yi Hwang (King Yejong). His tomb is known as Gwangneung (광릉) and is located in Namyangju, South Korea.

=== Worship ===
In Korean shamanism, Sejo is worshiped as a wangshin (왕신; 王神; lit. ''king god'').

== Family ==
- Father: King Sejong (세종대왕; 15 May 1397 – 8 April 1450)
  - Grandfather: King Taejong (태종대왕; 21 June 1367 – 8 June 1422)
  - Grandmother: Queen Wongyeong (원경왕후), of the Yeoheung Min clan (여흥 민씨; 6 August 1365 – 27 August 1420)
- Mother: Queen Soheon (소헌왕후), of the Cheongsong Shim clan (청송 심씨; 20 October 1395 – 28 April 1446)
  - Grandfather: Shim On (심온), Internal Prince Cheongcheon (청천부원군; 1375 – January 1419)
  - Grandmother: Grand Princess Consort of Samhan State (삼한국대부인), of the Sunheung An clan (순흥 안씨; ?–1444)

Consort(s) and their respective issue

- Queen Jeonghui (정희왕후), of the Papyeong Yun clan (파평 윤씨; 25 December 1418 – 15 May 1483)
  - Yi Jang (이장), Crown Prince Uigyeong (의경세자; 12 October 1438 – 29 September 1457), first son
  - Princess Uisuk (의숙공주; 1441 – 15 January 1478), first daughter
  - Princess Uiryeong (의령공주), given name Se-hui (세희), disputed daughter (Note: She is only mentioned in an unofficial history called Kŭmgye P'iltam (금계필담) written in 1873 by Seo Yu-yeong (서유영). The sole reference at her existence in an official document is a passage from the Veritable Records of the Joseon Dynasty, where Grand Prince Suyang (as Sejo was still known at the time) is recorded as having "one son and two daughters" [Sejong Sillok, year 28].)
  - Yi Hwang (이황), King Yejong (예종대왕; 23 January 1450 – 9 January 1470), third son
- Concubine Geun (근빈), of the Seonsan Park clan (선산 박씨; 1425–?)
  - Yi Seo (이서), Prince Deokwon (덕원군; 7 April 1449 – 18 August 1498), second son
  - Yi Seong (이성), Prince Changwon (창원군; 1458 – 14 September 1484), fourth son
- Soyong (소용), of the Park clan (박씨; ? – 3 October 1465) (Note: Demoted to palace maid (내인), then executed by hanging following a second offense.)
  - Unnamed son (1459–1463) (Note: His childhood name was A-ji (아지).)
- Sugwon (숙원), of the Goryeong Shin clan (고령 신씨) (Note: Daughter of Shin Suk-ju.)

== Ancestry ==
Ancestors of Sejo of Joseon

Yi Ja-chun, King Hwanjo (환조대왕 이자춘)
King Taejo (태조대왕)
Queen Uihye, of the Yeongheung Choe clan (의혜왕후 영흥 최씨)
King Taejong (태종대왕)
Han Gyeong, Internal Prince Ancheon (안천부원군 한경)
Queen Sinui, of the Cheongju Han clan (신의왕후 청주 한씨)
Grand Princess Consort of Samhan State, of the Saknyeong Shin clan (삼한국대부인 삭녕 신씨)
King Sejong (세종대왕)
Min Byeon (민변)
Min Je, Internal Prince Yeoheung (여흥부원군 민제)
Lady, of the Yangcheon Heo clan (양천 허씨)
Queen Wongyeong, of the Yeoheung Min clan (원경왕후 여흥 민씨)
Song Seon (송선)
Grand Princess Consort of Samhan State, of the Yeosan Song clan (삼한국대부인 여산 송씨)
Lady, of the Dalseong Ha clan (달성 하씨)
King Sejo
Shim Ryong (심룡)
Shim Deok-bu (심덕부)
Lady, of the Kim clan (김씨)
Shim On, Internal Prince Cheongcheon (청천부원군 심온)
Mun Pil-dae (문필대)
Lady, of the Incheon Mun clan (인천 문씨)
Queen Soheon, of Cheongsong Shim clan (소헌왕후 청송 심씨)
An Cheon-bo (안천보)
Grand Princess Consort of Samhan State, of the Sunheung An clan (삼한국대부인 순흥 안씨)
Lady, of the Yeongju Kim clan (영주 김씨)

== In popular culture ==
Sejo was a prominent character in The Ume Tree in the Midst of the Snow (설중매), the third installment of MBC's monumental series 500 Years of Joseon. Moon Ki-hoon of The Korean Herald labelled the depiction "a creative betrayal of the historical record", arguing that it attempted to rehabilitate Sejo's status as an usurper. Moon linked the depiction to political coercion from president Chun Doo-hwan, who gained his position from a coup in 1979.

The 2026 film The King's Warden depicts Danjong's exile and death. Though Sejo is not seen onscreen, the popularity of the film led to Sejo's royal tomb being review-bombed on several navigation apps.

- Portrayed by Kim Al-eum in the 1983 MBC TV series The King of Chudong Palace.
- Portrayed by Nam Sung-woo in the 1984–1985 MBC TV series 500 Years of Joseon: The Ume Tree in the Midst of the Snow.
- Portrayed by Seo In-seok in the 1994 KBS2 TV series Han Myung-hoi.
- Portrayed by Im Dong-jin in the 1998–2000 KBS1 TV series The King and the Queen.
- Portrayed by Choi Bong-sik in the 2007 KBS2 TV series Sayuksin.
- Portrayed by Kim Byung-se in the 2007–2008 SBS TV series The King and I.
- Portrayed by Kim Yeong-cheol in the 2011 KBS2 TV series The Princess' Man.
- Portrayed by Kim Young-ho in the 2011 JTBC TV series Insu, the Queen Mother.
- Portrayed by Lee Jung-jae in the 2013 film The Face Reader.
- Portrayed by Go Young-bin in the 2016 KBS1 TV series Jang Yeong-sil.
- Portrayed by Park Hee-soon in the 2019 film Jesters: The Game Changers.
- Portrayed by Kim Nam-gil in the 2026 film Canvas of Blood.

== See also ==
- History of Korea
- List of monarchs of Korea
- Styles and titles in Joseon
- Korean–Jurchen border conflicts

== Notes ==
Sejo of Joseon House of Yi Born: 11 November 1417 Died: 2 October 1468
Royal titles
Preceded by Danjong	King of Joseon; 4 July 1455 – 1 October 1468	Succeeded by Yejong
