= March 1st Independence Movement Road in Daegu =

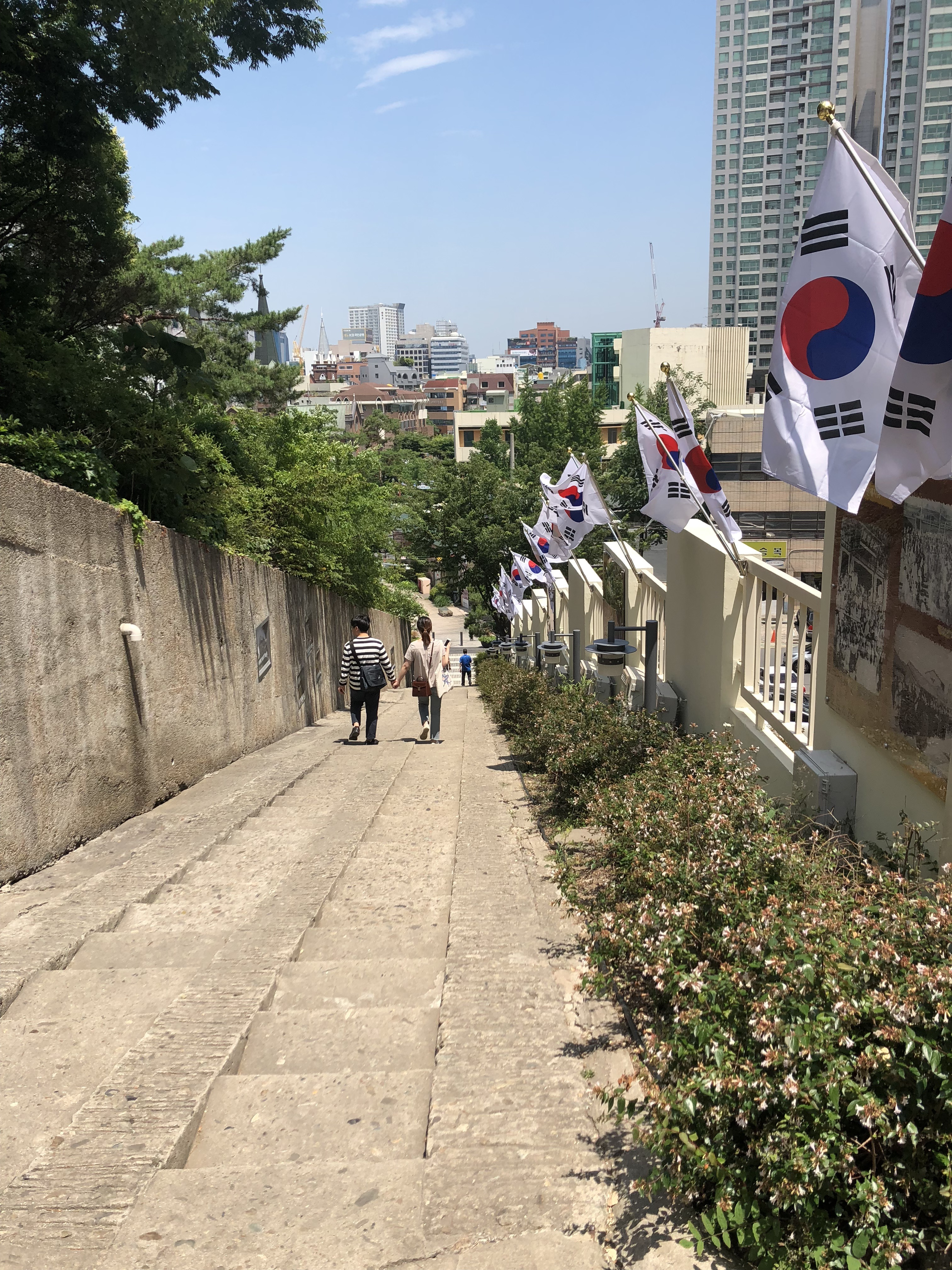
The 90-step stairs students hid and marched on during the revolt. Korean flags and photographs now align the road to remember its significance.

The March 1st Independence Movement Road in Daegu (3.1 운동길) is located in Dosan-dong, Jung-gu, Daegu of the Gyeongsang Province in South Korea. On March 8, 1919, students from various high schools in the area secretly assembled and rallied down this alleyway — at the time a pine forest — and its 90-step stairs during the March 1st Independence Movement. The road is located near many other historical sites relevant to the March 1st Independence Movement and overarching independence struggle, including the new building of the Daegu First Presbyterian Church, the homes of the Christian missionaries from the U.S., and the home of Seo Sang-don, the leader of the National Debt Repayment Movement, which aimed to gain back Korean autonomy. Today, pictures from the March 1st Independence Movement and taegukgis (Korean flags) decorate the walls all along the road, and it is included in many Daegu tourist courses due to the road's significance.

== Background ==
=== March 1st Independence Movement ===
Korea had been under Japanese rule from 1910-1945. One of the earliest demonstrations of resistance occurred in 1919 with the March 1st Independence Movement.

The March 1st Independence Movement started on March 1, 1919, by which millions of Koreans assembled and marched, declaring Korean independence from Japan. These demonstrations occurred mostly in the capital Seoul, but also all throughout Korea, reaching all the way south to Busan. One of the active cities in this movement was Daegu of the Gyeongsang Province, with its own branch of the Independence Club as well as a women-led group called The Patriotic Women's Educational Society. On March 8, 1919, about 23,000 people protested in four major demonstrations across Daegu against the Japanese colonization of Korea, shouting “Mansae!" or "Long live Korean independence!" and reading out the Declaration of Independence of Korea from Japan. These demonstrations were met with harsh violence from the Japanese police, with many citizens being injured and murdered.

== Revolt in Daegu ==
=== Important Actors ===
==== Christians ====
Christians played a considerable role in the March 1st Movement. This was true of the movement in Daegu as well, with many of its leaders and activists of Protestant faith. Churches were an active force in the independence movement, which explains the significance of the proximity of the Independence Road with the new building of Daegu First Presbyterian Church as well as the original homes of Christian missionaries.

- Man-jip Lee was a minister at the First Presbyterian Church of Daegu, and the first president of Kyonam YMCA, where many Daegu youth organized campaigns for independence. He received the Declaration of Independence from a messenger from Seoul, and played a leading role during the protest on March 8. He was arrested by Japanese police for his involvement.
- Tae-ryun Kim worked closely with missionaries and Man-jip Lee as the first manager of Kyonam YMCA. Kim received the Declaration of Independence from Lee and made copies in his home. He initiated the protest on March 8 by reading the Declaration of Independence, and his undying spirit even while being arrested ignited the passion of the remaining protesters. His son Yong-hae Kim was also arrested for his active involvement and became the first victim of the independence movement in Daegu after being tortured and killed by Japanese police.

==== High School Students ====
The independence movement in Daegu was nicknamed "the student movement" for its significant participation of students. Of the nearly 1,000 people who protested on March 8, the majority were students from Keisung, Shinmyung, and Daegu high schools. Students left school early that day to come participate in the protest, some hiding as marketers in West Gate Market and some hiding from Japanese surveillance on the stairwell in the nearby pine forest, now known as the March 1st Independence Movement Road. The students were a crucial part in the longevity of the protest, as they continued on after the original leaders had gotten arrested, allowing the movement to spread to neighboring cities. Currently, there are monuments built at Shinmyung and Keisung schools to commemorate the students' involvement in the movement.

==== Seo Sang-don ====
Seo Sang-don was the leader of the National Debt Repayment Movement, which he started in the efforts to gain back Korean autonomy after Japan supplied a massive loan in the attempts to strengthen its control over Korea. Seo started the movement in Daegu, and it spread to the rest of the country as part of the larger independence movement. Seo's house is located near the March 1st Independence Movement Road, and is included along with the road in many tourist courses about the independence movement in Daegu.

==== Women ====
Women were particularly active in the Daegu efforts of the independence movement through the Patriotic Women's League, Korean Patriotic Women's Society, and the National Debt Repayment Movement. Shinmyung High School, of which students took an active part in the March 8 protest, was also an all-girls' school. The Patriotic Women's League and Korean Patriotic Women's Society were underground groups actively resisting Japanese colonization by mobilizing community members, raising money for campaigns, and organizing the March 1st movement, and were active in Daegu as well. Women were also key players in the National Debt Repayment Movement started by Seo Sang-don in Daegu. While Seo encouraged men to save money by giving up smoking, women contributed by donating jewelry.

- Aengmu was a Kisaeng who initiated women's participation in the National Debt Repayment Movement. She donated her own jewelry and cash despite belonging to a lower class, and encouraged her peers to do the same. Many Kisaeng, as well as other women, followed in her footsteps, inspired by her boldness during a time when it was rare for women to be involved socially.

== Timeline ==
- January 28 - February 28, 1919: Planning in Seoul
  - Earliest actors of support were Christians and practicers of Ch'ondogyo.
  - Declaration of Independence drafted. Among the 33 original signers is Gab-sung Lee, a Daegu native.
  - Messengers with copies of the Declaration sent to other areas of country, including the Gyeongsang Province.
- February 28, 1919: Meeting held among Declaration signers to finalize details of protest
- March 1, 1919: Protest in Seoul
  - Movement leaders read Declaration of Independence at small restaurant, and are arrested by Japanese police soon after.
  - Students assemble at Pagoda Park at 2pm to declare independence and start marching.
  - Movement spreads rapidly to other cities through messengers and word of mouth.
- March 2, 1919: Movement reaches Daegu
  - Minister Man-jip Lee in Daegu receives Declaration of Independence from Yong-sang Lee, a medical student at Yonsei University in Seoul.
  - Headed by Gab-sung Lee, one of the signers of the Declaration, a protest is planned for 1pm on March 8, 1919, starting at the entrance of West Gate Market.
  - Man-jip Lee, Tae-ryun Kim, and Ju-il Hong gather local support for protest.
  - Copies of Declaration secretly made in the home of Tae-ryun Kim.
  - Korean flags produced in the basement of the Adams house, home of one of the first American missionaries in Daegu.
- March 4, 1919: Minister Ju-il Hong of Daegu arrested for involvement in movement
- March 7, 1919: Teacher Nam-chae Baek of Daegu arrested for involvement in movement
- March 8, 1919: Protest in Daegu
  - With Japanese surveillance especially strong in Daegu, protesters use nearby pine forest, which encompassed the 90-step stairs, to hide from Japanese police until the time comes to gather.
  - Some students arrive at West Gate Market and act as marketers, while some hide in the pine forest.
  - Some students arrive late, but the protest does not start without them.
  - About 1,000 protesters assemble at entrance of West Gate Market.
  - Tae-ryun Kim starts to read the Declaration of Independence but is suppressed by Japanese police. While being dragged out, he yells "Long live Korean Independence!" Man-jip Lee steps up in Kim's place.
  - Protesters take out Korean flags and yell "Long live Korean independence!" while parading.
  - The protest is joined by a diversity of people, including leaders, students, merchants, peasants, and kisaengs.
  - Japanese police opens fire on the unarmed protesters.
  - Man-jip Lee, Tae-ryun Kim, and his son, Yong-hae Kim are arrested.
  - Yong-hae Kim dies from torture by Japanese police, becoming the first victim of the independent movement in Daegu.
  - Students continue the protest.
- March 9, 1919: Uncaptured protesters continue revolt in Daegu and spread the movement to all of North Gyeongsang.
- March 9, 1919: Protest in Gyeongju
- March 10, 1919: Protest in South Chungchong, South Jeolla, North Hamgyong, and Kangwon Provinces
- March 11, 1919: Protest in Busan

== Description ==
The historic road is now called "March 1st Independence Movement Road (3.1 운동길)", and is aligned with photos of the movement, as well as the people and groups who were active in Daegu. There have been reenactments and events along the road to commemorate this important event.

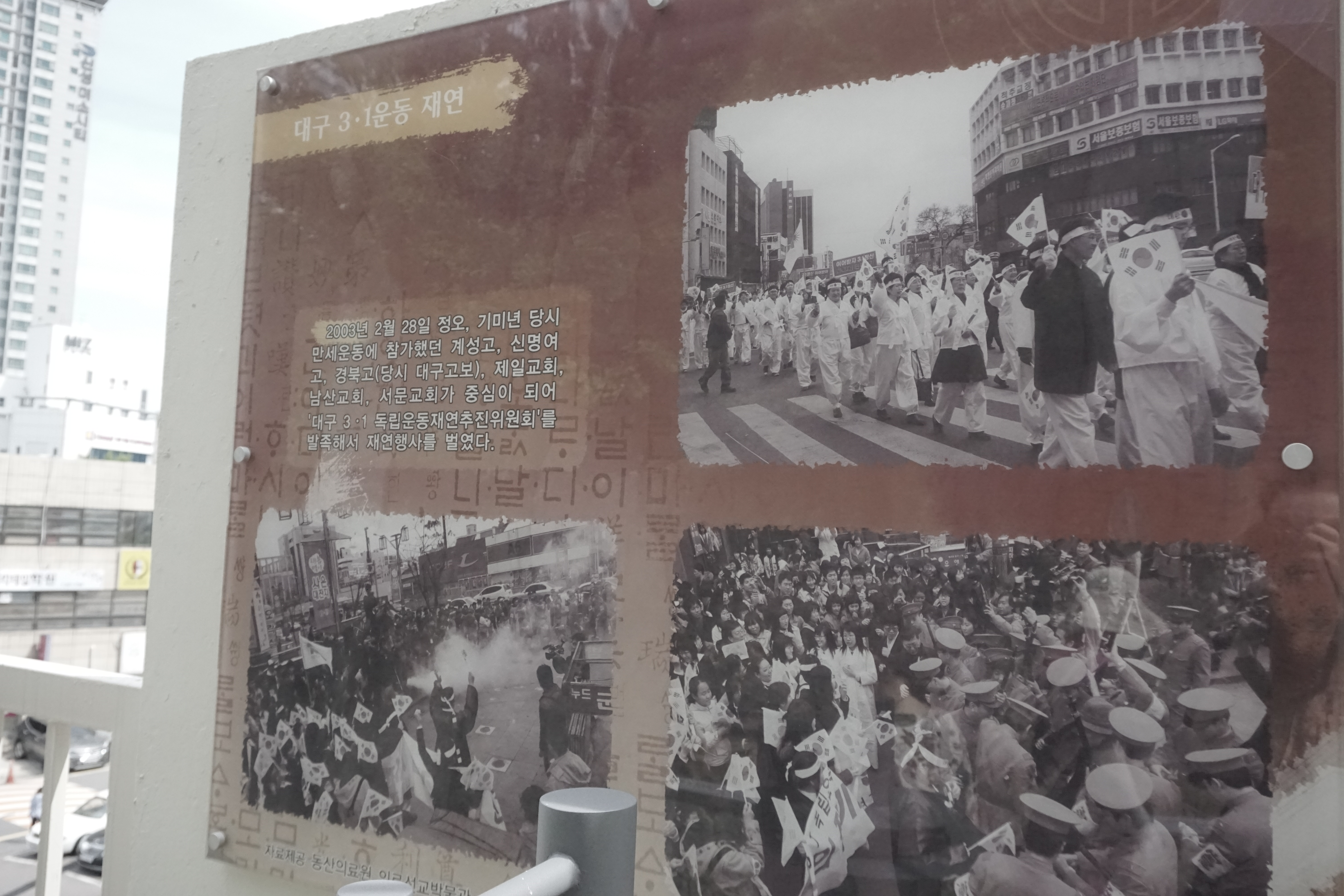
Photographs of a reenactment of the protest displayed along the 90-step stairs

=== Tourism ===
The March 1st Independence Movement Road has become a common tourist attraction in Daegu. The road and stairs are included in many tourist courses along with other significant areas related to the March 1st Independence Movement, such as the new building of the Daegu First Presbyterian Church, the homes of the Christian missionaries from the U.S., and the home of Seo Sang-don.

Not only is the road an attraction for its significance in the independence movement, it has also been popularized as a place to remember one's first love. The stairs are mentioned in the famous Korean love song "My Friend" and are thus visited by many who are fans of the song.
