= Sex industry =

Field of business

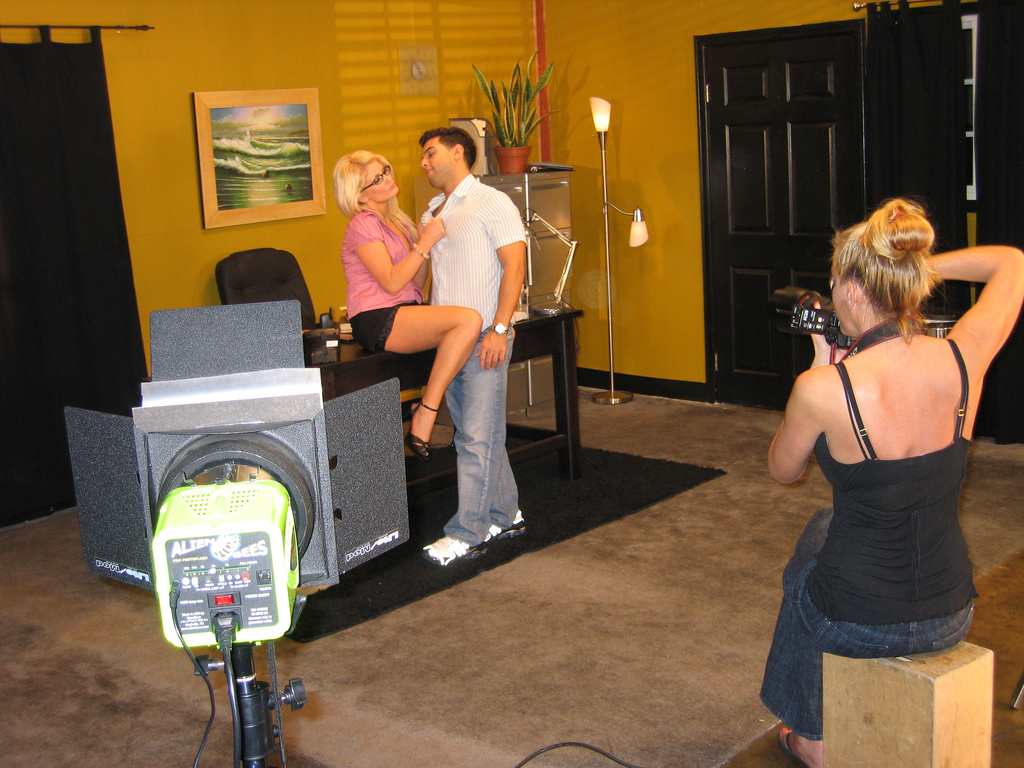
The film set for an American pornographic film

The sex industry, also called the sex trade, consists of businesses that either directly or indirectly provide sex-related products and services or adult entertainment. The industry includes activities involving direct provision of sex-related services, such as prostitution, strip clubs, host and hostess clubs, and sex-related pastimes, such as pornography, adult magazines, sex movies, sex toys, and fetish or BDSM paraphernalia. Sex channels for television and pre-paid sex movies for video on demand, are part of the sex industry, as are adult movie theaters, sex shops, peep shows, and strip clubs. The sex industry employs millions of people worldwide, mainly women. These range from the sex worker, also called adult service provider (ASP), (Note: Adult service provider is a legal term sometimes used to mean erotic entertainer.) who provides sexual services, to a multitude of support personnel.

== Etymology ==
The origins of the term sex industry are uncertain, but it appears to have arisen in the 1970s. A 1977 report by the Ontario Royal Commission on Violence in the Communications Industry (LaMarsh Commission) quoted author Peter McCabe as writing in Argosy: "Ten years ago the sex industry did not exist. When people talked of commercial sex they meant Playboy." A 1976 article in The New York Times by columnist Russell Baker claimed that "[M]ost of the problems created by New York City's booming sex industry result from the city's reluctance to treat it as an industry", arguing why sex shops constituted an "industry", and should be treated as such by concentrating them in a single neighborhood, suggesting the "sex industry" was not yet commonly recognized as such.

The term industry in this context can be misleading, as many of the enterprises are artisanal and disconnected from each other.

== Types ==
=== Prostitution ===
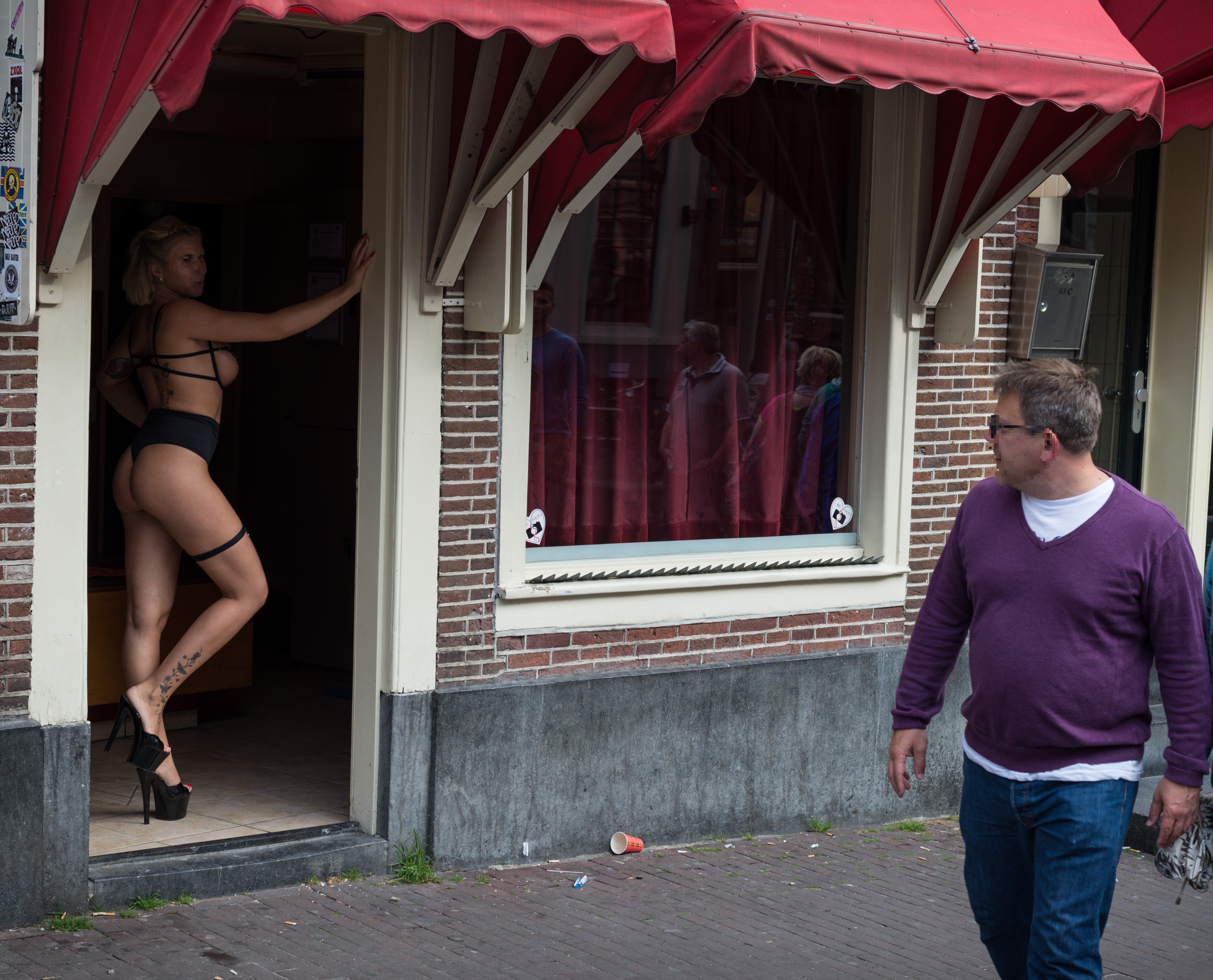
A prostitute advertises to a passerby in the red-light district in Amsterdam

Prostitution is a main component of the sex industry and may take place in a brothel, at a facility provided by the prostitute, at a client's hotel room, in a parked car, or on the street. Often this is arranged through a pimp or an escort agency. Prostitution involves a prostitute or sex worker providing commercial sexual services to a client. In some cases, the prostitute is at liberty to determine whether she or he will engage in a particular type of sexual activity, but forced prostitution and sexual slavery does exist in some places around the world. Reasons as to why an individual may enter into prostitution are varied. Socialist and radical feminists have cited poverty, oppressive capitalistic processes, and patriarchal societies that marginalizes people based on race and class as reasons for the continued presence of prostitution, as these aspects all work together to maintain oppression. Other reasons include displacement due to conflict and war. Institutionalized racism in the United States has been cited as a reason for the prevalence of sex workers who are Black or other people of color, as this leads to inequality and a lack of access to resources.

The legality of prostitution and associated activities (soliciting, brothels, procuring) varies by jurisdiction. Yet even where it is illegal, a thriving underground business usually exists because of high demand and the high income that can be made by pimps, brothel owners, escort agencies, and traffickers.

A brothel is a commercial establishment where people may engage in sexual activity with a prostitute, though for legal or cultural reasons they may describe themselves as massage parlors, bars, strip clubs or by some other description. Sex work in a brothel is considered safer than street prostitution.

Prostitution and the operation of brothels are legal in some countries, but illegal in others. For instance, there are legal brothels in Nevada, US, due to the legalization of prostitution in some areas of the state. In countries where prostitution and brothels are legal, brothels may be subject to many and varied restrictions. Forced prostitution is usually illegal as is prostitution by or with minors, though the age may vary. Some countries prohibit particular sex acts. In some countries, brothels are subject to strict planning restrictions and in some cases are confined to designated red-light districts. Some countries prohibit or regulate how brothels advertise their services, or they may prohibit the sale or consumption of alcohol on the premises. In some countries where operating a brothel is legal, some brothel operators may choose to operate illegally.

Some men and women may travel away from their home to engage with local prostitutes, in a practice called sex tourism, and can have a variety of different socio-economic effects on the destinations. Male sex tourism can create or augment demand for sex services in the host countries, while female sex tourism tends not to use facilities that are specifically devoted to that purpose. Like tourism in general, sex tourism can make a significant contribution to local economies, especially in popular urban centers and places particularly known as sex tourism destinations. Sex tourism may arise as a result of stringent anti-prostitution laws in a tourist's home country, and although it may contribute to the destination economy, it can create social problems in the host country.

Prostitution is extremely prevalent in Asia, particularly in Southeast Asian nations such as Indonesia, Malaysia, Philippines, and Thailand. Due to the longstanding economic instability of many of these nations, increasing numbers of women have been forced to turn towards the sex industry there for work. According to Lin Lim, an International Labour Organization official who directed a study on prostitution in Southeast Asia, "it is very likely that women who lose their jobs in manufacturing and other service sectors and whose families rely on their remittances may be driven to enter the sex sector." The sex industry of some destinations has consequently grown to become their dominant commercial sector. Conversely, the sex industry in China has been revived by the nation's recent economic success. The nation's liberal economic policies in the early 1980s have been credited with revitalizing the sex industry as rural communities rapidly expand into highly developed urban centers. A typical example of this can be found in the city of Dalian. The city was declared a special economic zone in 1984; by the twenty-first century what had been a small fishing community developed an advanced commercial sector and a correspondingly large sex industry. A large portion of China's sex workers are immigrants from other Asian nations, such as Korea and Japan. In spite of these circumstances, most Asian countries do not have strong policies regarding prostitution. Their governments are challenged in this regard because of the differing contexts that surround prostitution, from voluntary and financially beneficial labor to virtual slavery. The increasing economic prominence of China and Japan have made these issues a global concern. As a result of Southeast Asia's lax policies regarding prostitution, the region has also become a popular part of the world for sex tourism, with a significant portion of this industry's clients being North American or European.

=== Pornography ===
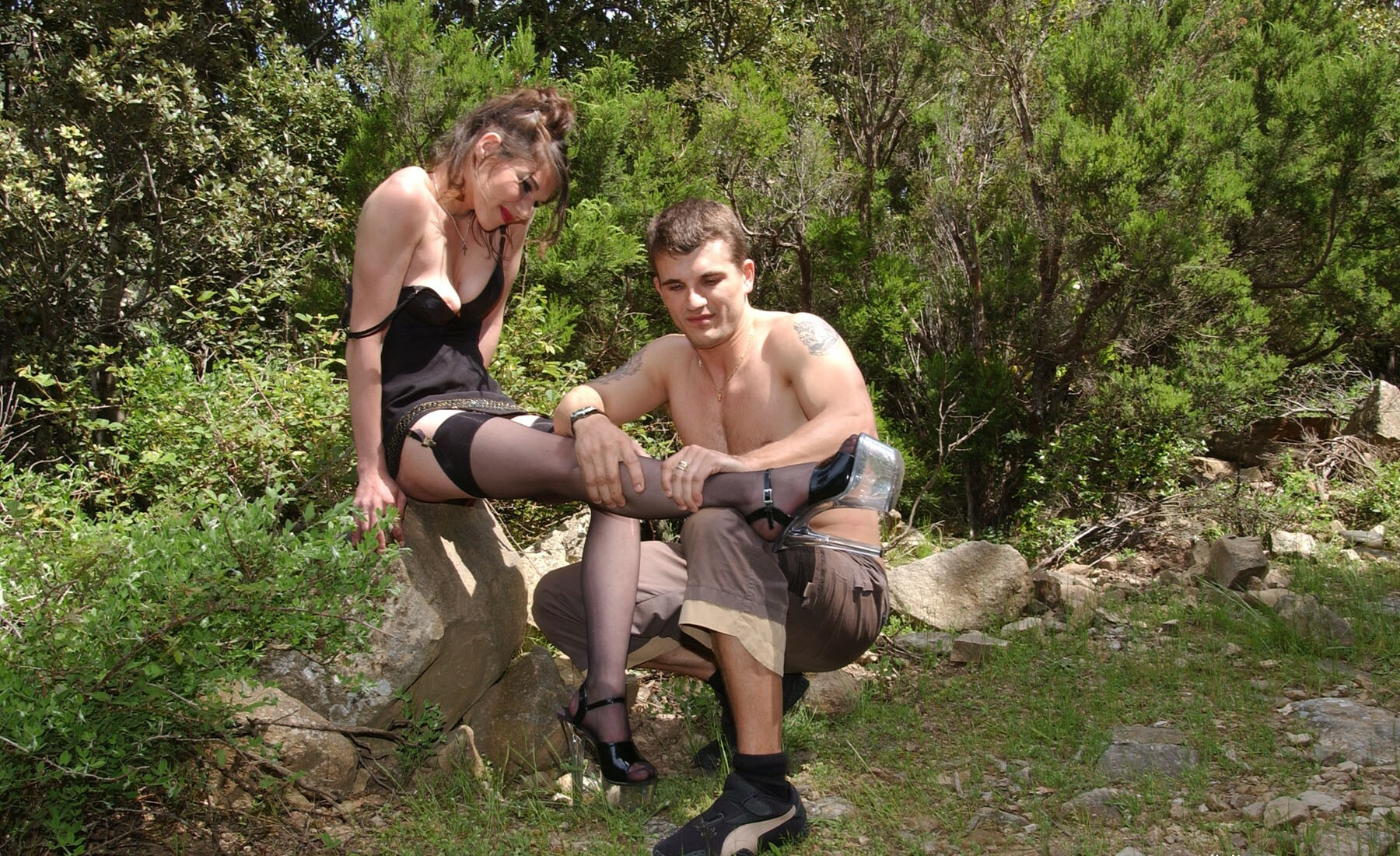
Two porn actors preparing to shoot an outdoor scene for an adult film

Pornography is the explicit portrayal of explicit sexual subject matter for the purposes of sexual arousal and erotic satisfaction. A pornographic model poses for pornographic photographs. A pornographic film actor or porn star performs in pornographic films. In cases where only limited dramatic skills are involved, a performer in pornographic films may be called a pornographic model. Pornography can be provided to the consumer in a variety of media, ranging from books, magazines, postcards, photos, videos, sound recording, sculptures, drawing, painting, animation, films, or video games. However, when sexual acts are performed for a live audience, by definition it is not pornography, as the term applies to the depiction of the act, rather than the act itself. Thus, portrayals such as sex shows and striptease are not classified as pornography.

The first home-PCs capable of network communication prompted the arrival of online services for adults in the late 1980s and early 1990s. The wide-open early days of the World Wide Web quickly snowballed into the dot-com boom, in-part fueled by an incredible global increase in the demand for and consumption of pornography and erotica. Around 2009, the U.S. porn industry's revenue of $10–15 billion a year was more than the combined revenue of professional sports and live music combined and roughly on par or above Hollywood's box office revenue.

There is mixed evidence on the social impact of pornography. Some insights come from meta-analyses synthesizing data from prior research. A 2015 meta-analysis indicated that pornography consumption is correlated with sexual aggression. However, it is unknown if pornography promotes, reduces or has no effect on sexual aggression at an individual level, because this correlation may not be causal. In fact, counter intuitively, pornography has been found to reduce sexual aggression at a societal level. A 2009 review stated that all scientific investigations of increases in the availability of pornography show no change or a decrease in the level of sexual offending. The question of whether pornography consumption affects consumers' happiness was addressed by a 2017 meta-analysis. It concluded that men who consume pornography are less satisfied with some areas of their lives, but pornography consumption does not make a significant difference in other areas, or to the lives of women. Additionally, a sample of Americans revealed in 2017 that those who had viewed pornography were more likely to experience romantic relationship breakup than their non-pornography watching counterparts, and that the effect was more pronounced with men.

=== Other types ===
Adult entertainment is entertainment intended to be viewed by adults only, and distinguished from family entertainment. The style of adult entertainment may be ribaldry or bawdry. Any entertainment that normally includes sexual content qualifies as adult entertainment, including sex channels for television and pre-paid sex films for "on demand", as well as adult movie theaters, sex shops, and strip clubs. It also includes sex-oriented men's magazines, sex movies, sex toys and fetish and BDSM paraphernalia. Sex workers can be prostitutes, call girls, pornographic film actors, pornographic models, sex show performers, erotic dancers, striptease dancers, bikini baristas, telephone sex operators, cybersex operators, erotic massage providers, or amateur porn stars for online sex sessions and videos. Other specialists in the wider industry include courtesans and dominatrixes, some of whom may hope to earn more by specialising in these niche markets.

Other members of the sex industry include the hostesses that work in many bars in China. These hostesses are women who are hired by men to sit with them and provide them with company, which entails drinking and making conversation, while the men flirt and make sexual comments. A number of these hostesses also offer sexual services at offsite locations to the men who hire them. Although this is not done by every woman who works as a hostess in the bars of China, the hostesses are all generally labeled as "grey women". This means that while they are not seen as prostitutes, they are not considered suitable marriage partners for many men. Other woman who are included in the "grey women" category are the permanent mistresses or "second wives" that many Chinese businessmen have. The Chinese government makes efforts to keep secret the fact that many of these hostesses are also prostitutes and make up a significant part of the sex industry. They do not want China's image in the rest of the world to become sullied. Hostesses are given a significant degree of freedom to choose whether or not they would like to service a client sexually, although a refusal does sometimes spark conflict.

In addition, like any other industry, there are people who work in or service the sex industry as managers, film crews, photographers, website developers and webmasters, sales personnel, book and magazine writers and editors, etc. Some create business models, negotiate trade, make press releases, draw up contracts with other owners, buy and sell content, offer technical support, run servers, billing services, or payroll, organize trade shows and various events, do marketing and sales forecasts, provide human resources, or provide tax services and legal support. Usually, those in management or staff do not have direct dealings with sex workers, instead hiring photographers who have direct contact with the sex workers.

== Perspectives ==
The sex industry is controversial, and there are people, organizations and governments that have objections to it, and, as a result, pornography, prostitution, striptease and other similar occupations are illegal in many countries. This is typically the case in countries with strong religious traditions.

The term anti-pornography movement is used to describe those who argue that pornography has a variety of harmful effects on society, such as encouragement of human trafficking, desensitization, pedophilia, dehumanization, exploitation, sexual dysfunction, and inability to maintain healthy sexual relationships.

=== Feminist views ===
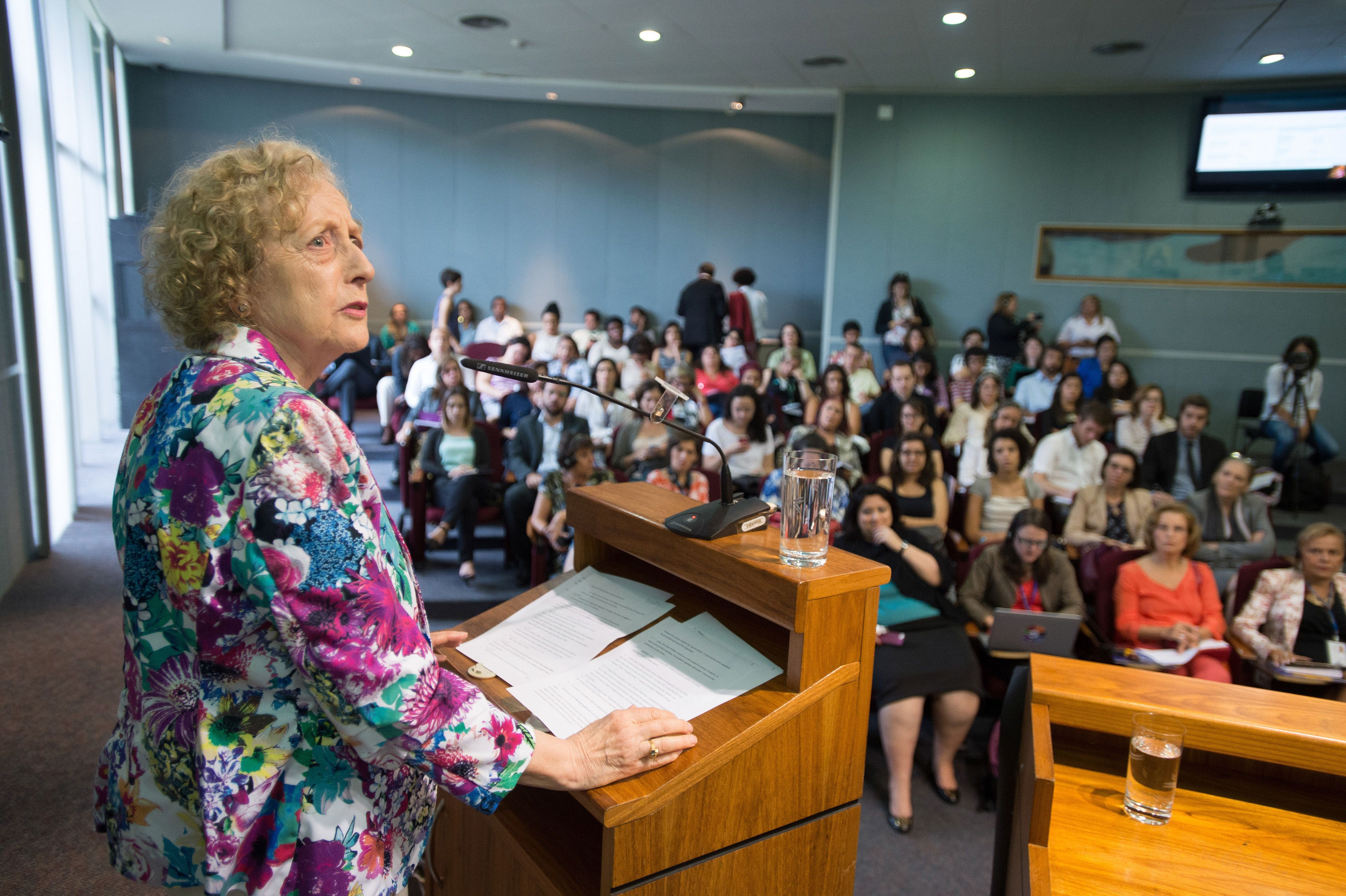
British feminist and political theorist Carole Pateman, who has condemned the commodification of women caused by the sex industry

Feminism is divided on the issue of the sex industry. In her essay "What is wrong with prostitution", Carole Pateman makes the point that it is literally the objectification of woman. They are making their bodies an object that men can buy for a price. She also makes the point that prostitution and many other sex industries reinforce the idea of male ownership of a woman. On the other hand, some other feminists see the sex industry as empowering women. They could be seen as simply jobs. The woman who is working them are breaking free from social norms that would previously keep their sexuality under wraps as immoral. Based on these arguments, Sweden, Norway and Iceland have criminalized the buying of sexual services, while decriminalizing the selling of sexual services. (In other words, clients and pimps can be prosecuted for moneyed sexual transactions, but not prostitutes). Supporters of this model of legislation claim reduced illegal prostitution and human trafficking in these countries. Opponents dispute these claims. Women's rights organisations and sex workers have opposed the Nordic model and attempts to criminalise those paying for sex, saying that it pushes the industry underground and makes work more dangerous for sex workers and increases violence against women, instead supporting the full decriminalisation or legalisation of sex work.

Some feminists, such as Gail Dines, are opposed to pornography, arguing that it is an industry which exploits women and which is complicit in violence against women, both in its production (where they charge that abuse and exploitation of women performing in pornography are rampant) and in its consumption (where they charge that pornography eroticizes the domination, humiliation, and coercion of women, and reinforces sexual and cultural attitudes that are complicit in rape and sexual harassment). They charge that pornography contributes to the male-centered objectification of women and thus to sexism. However, other feminists are opposed to censorship, and have argued against the introduction of anti-porn legislation in the United States—among them Betty Friedan, Kate Millett, Karen DeCrow, Wendy Kaminer and Jamaica Kincaid.

== Socio-economic issues ==
=== Use of children ===
While the legality of adult sexual entertainment varies by country, the use of children in the sex industry is illegal nearly everywhere in the world.

Commercial sexual exploitation of children (CSEC) is the "sexual abuse by the adult and remuneration in cash or kind to the child or a third person or persons. The child is treated as a sexual object and as a commercial object".

CSEC includes the prostitution of children, child pornography, child sex tourism and other forms of transactional sex where a child engages in sexual activities to have key needs fulfilled, such as food, shelter or access to education. It includes forms of transactional sex where the sexual abuse of children is not stopped or reported by household members, due to benefits derived by the household from the perpetrator. CSEC is prevalent in Asia and parts of Latin America.

Thailand, Cambodia, India, Brazil, and Mexico have been identified as the primary countries where the commercial sexual exploitation of children takes place. Certain places around the world are recognized for child sex tourism.

=== Low socio-economic status ===
==== Caste-based prostitution ====
Castes are largely hereditary social classes often emerging around certain professions. Lower castes are associated with professions considered "unclean", which has often included prostitution. In pre-modern Korea, the Kisaeng were women from the lower caste Cheonmin who were trained to provide entertainment, conversation, and sexual services to men of the upper class. In South Asia, castes whose females are involved in prostitution by tradition, sometimes called Intergenerational prostitution, include the Bedias, the Perna caste, the Banchhada, the Nat caste and, in Nepal, the Badi people.

==== Migrants ====
Some researchers have claimed that sex workers can benefit from their profession in terms of immigration status. In her essay "Selling Sex for Visas: Sex Tourism as a Stepping-Stone to International Migration" anthropologist Denise Brennan cited an example of prostitutes in the Dominican Republic resort town of Sosúa, where some female prostitutes marry their customers in order to immigrate to other countries and seek a better life. The customers are, however, the ones that hold the power in this situation as they can withhold or revoke the sex worker's visa, either denying them the ability to immigrate or forcing them to return to their country of origin.. Sex workers are also at risk of judgement from family members and relatives for having been associated with the sex tourism industry. Migrant sex work happens due to globalization. Globalization has produced growth both in sex tourism and in the migration of women to places where the sex industry thrives.

=== Effect on crime ===
Additionally, some researchers claim that pornography causes unequivocal harm to society by increasing rates of sexual assault, a line of research which has been critiqued in "The effects of Pornography: An International Perspective" on external validity grounds, while others claim there is a correlation between pornography and a decrease of sex crimes.

=== Discrimination and exoticization ===
Some customers see sex workers from other countries as exotic commodities that can be fetishized or exploited. Many producers and proponents of pornography featuring gay actors claim that this work is liberating and offers them a voice in popular media while critics view it as a degradation of the eroticization of inequality and that advocates for this new line of cinema are only creating a new barrier for gay people to contend with.

=== Spread of diseases ===
The sex industry also raises concerns about the spread of sexually transmitted infections.

== See also ==
- Adult Film Association of America
- AdultVest
- AVN
- Critics Adult Film Association
- Erotic massage
- List of adult industry awards
- List of pornographic film awards
- List of strip clubs
- Neo-Burlesque
- Portland TV
- Sexually oriented business
- Sex-positive feminism
- Sex-positive movement
- Sex Shouldn't Be a Crime
- Sex tourism
- Sex workers' rights
- Spintria
- Third-wave feminism
- Transgender sex worker
- XBIZ
- XRCO awards
- XRCO Hall of Fame
