= Love, Lies (2016 film) =

- Theatrical release poster
- Hangul: 해어화
- Hanja: 解語花
- RR: Haeeohwa
- MR: Haeŏhwa
- Directed by: Park Heung-sik
- Written by: Ha Young-joon; Jeon Yun-su; Song Hye-jin
- Produced by: Park Sun-jin
- Starring: Han Hyo-joo; Chun Woo-hee; Yoo Yeon-seok
- Cinematography: Jo Eun-soo
- Edited by: Lee Sang-beom; Lee Jae-beom
- Music by: Lee Byung-hoon
- Production company: The Lamp
- Distributed by: Lotte Entertainment
- Release date: April 13, 2016 (South Korea)
- Running time: 120 minutes
- Country: South Korea
- Languages: Korean; Japanese
- Box office: US$3.4 million (South Korea)

Love, Lies (Korean: 해어화; RR: Haeeohwa) is 2016 South Korean period drama film directed by Park Heung-sik, reuniting The Beauty Inside co-stars Han Hyo-joo, Chun Woo-hee and Yoo Yeon-seok. The story takes place in 1943, during the Imperial Japanese occupation of Korea. In the film, best friends Jung So-yul (Han Hyo-joo) and Seo Yeon-hee (Chun Woo-hee) are two of the last remaining gisaeng. Although they enjoy pop music, they are committed to singing jeongga, or classical Korean songs. So-yul's life falls apart when her lover, pop music producer Kim Yoon-woo (Yoo Yeon-seok), falls in love with Yeon-hee and helps her debut as a pop singer. The story follows So-yul's downward spiral as she is heartbroken after getting betrayed by her bestfriend and her lover.

The film was released on April 13, 2016. Critics particularly praised the film for its meticulous reconstruction of 1940s Seoul, with period-correct sets, props, costumes and music.

== Plot ==
In Imperial Japanese-occupied Korea, Jeong So-yul is a gisaeng-in-training at one of the last remaining gwonbeon, learning to sing jeongga, the classical songs of Korea's upper class. So-yul is the daughter of a famous gisaeng, who is also the institution's headmistress. Seo Yeon-hee arrives at the school after she is sold by her father, who cannot take care of her. The young girls become best friends.

In 1943, So-yul and Yeon-hee graduates as two of the best students in the school. They both enjoy the popular songs of the day, but promise each other to keep their dignity as the only gisaeng who sing jeongga. So-yul's natural talent and beauty make her the center of attention, and she receives invitations from important people including the Japanese chief of police. But So-yul is devoted to her boyfriend, top pop songwriter Kim Yoon-woo. Yoon-woo asks So-yul to sing a song he is writing to encourage the Korean people suffering under Japanese rule.

However, things begins to fall apart when he hears Yeon-hee sing and is mesmerized by her voice. Yoon-woo writes the song for Yeon-hee and encourages her to leave the gwonbeon to help her become a pop singer, because pop songs speak more to the common people instead of just the upper class. Yeon-hee takes his advice and leaves the institution. So-yul feels betrayed cause Yoon-woo didn't fulfil his promise to her. After spending much time together for the production of Yeon-hee's album, Yoon-woo falls in love with her. After Yeon-hee's debut concert when So-yul wents to meet her, she find them in a inappropriate situation. Fueled by her feeling of betrayal, So-yul attempts to regain what she believes her friend stole from her, destroying the lives of those around her, and ultimately herself.

== Cast ==
- Han Hyo-joo as Jung So-yul
  - Kim Su-an as young Jung So-yul
- Chun Woo-hee as Seo Yeon-hee
- Yoo Yeon-seok as Kim Yoon-woo
- Park Sung-woong as Japanese police chief, Hirata Kiyoshi
- Jang Young-nam as San-wol
- Lee Han-wi as Purser
- Ryu Hye-young as Kim Ok-hyang
- Jang In-sub as Hong-seok
- Oh Ha-nee as Gyeongseong club employee
- Kim Bo-yoon as Yawn senior
- Hiromitsu Takeda as Military police
- Lee Kyu-jung as Sampae student 1
- Hwang Byeong-guk as Councilor
- Son Seong-chan as Japanese army general
- Cha Ji-yeon as Lee Nan-young
- Kim Young-min as Producer

== Production and release ==
Filming began on June 21, 2015 and finished on October 17. The three lead actors had previously worked together on the 2015 film The Beauty Inside. Han Hyo-joo accepted the role of So-yul because Love, Lies is female-dominated, unlike most recent successful Korean films. She also wanted to try a more challenging role, as this is the first time she played an antagonist. To prepare for the role, she learned Japanese, dancing, and traditional Korean songs.

The film was launched in October 2015 at Busan International Film Festival's Asian Film Market. In March 2016, it was promoted at Hong Kong International Film & TV Market, securing distribution deals in Japan (KlockWorx), Taiwan (KBro Media) and the Philippines (Viva Communications). The VIP premiere was held on April 11, 2016 at Lotte Cinema in Songpa District, Seoul, and it premiered nationwide on April 13. It opened in fifth place at the box office, with 133,563 tickets sold across 572 screens. The film earned US$1.67 million in a five-day period (Wednesday to Sunday).

== Critical reception ==
Rumy Doo of The Korea Herald called the film "meticulously made-up" and pointed to its painstaking recreation of 1940s Seoul (then called Gyeongseong). Doo said Han Hyo-joo's acting is "somewhat strained" in the beginning of the film, but her portrayal of a jealous, wronged woman is more convincing and "painfully human". Jin Eun-soo of the Korea JoongAng Daily called the film a "feast for the eyes and ears", praising the actors' musical talent, the costume design, and the reconstruction of 1940s Seoul. Yun Suh-young of The Korea Times also praised the actors' musical performance.

Shim Sun-ah of Yonhap News Agency gave the film a more mixed review. She praised Han Hyo-joo and Chun Woo-hee's "brilliant performances", but said Chun's singing was not good enough to be believable for a character with "mesmerizing talent". Shim also disliked So-yul's "very unnatural" makeup as an elderly woman. According to Shim, the film's greatest weakness is the storyline, because it is vague about how Yoon-woo's love shifts from So-yul to Yeon-hee, and why Yeon-hee feels no remorse for taking her best friend's lover. Shim said the film's greatest strength is its "immaculate period reconstruction", with accurate sets, props, costumes and music.

== Themes ==
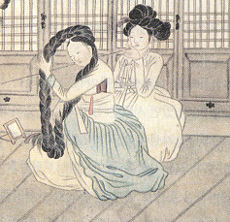
Gisaeng in a 19th-century painting

Highlighted in the film is the conflict between tradition and modernity, illustrated by the classical jeongga and early Korean pop music (later known as trot). At a press junket for the film, director Park Heung-sik explained how he chose the film's setting: "The 1940s was a doomed period for Koreans ... But it was also a period when Korean pop first emerged and experienced its golden age. It was a good period to show the conflict between two female gisaeng who wanted to become top singers." Park concentrated on how So-yul loses herself through jealousy, the "universal emotion", and later finds herself and regrets her past. He said the film can be summed up by the phrase, "Why didn't I know that before, if it was so good".

Another theme in the film is the duality that was expected of gisaeng, who were well-educated in the arts but treated as socially inferior, and ultimately existed for men's pleasure. The film's Korean title literally means "flowers that understand words" or "a flower that can talk", referring to gisaeng. This is explained by So-yul's mother in the film: "Gisaeng are like flowers that can understand human speech...We're flowers meant to be picked by men who grant our wishes".

== Awards ==
2016 4th BIFF with Marie Claire Asia Star Awards

- Asia Star Award: Han Hyo-joo
