= Caste in the sex industry =

Castes are largely hereditary social classes often emerging around certain professions. Lower castes are associated with professions considered "unclean", which has often included the sex industry. The term caste-based prostitution, or intergenerational prostitution, is sometimes used to refer to when women of certain castes are traditionally involved in prostitution. Additionally, the vulnerable socio-economic status of lower caste women leads to a significant percentage of them entering sex work.

== Examples ==
=== India ===
A social activist speculated that in India, there might be an estimated 100,000 lower-caste women and girls working in prostitution. This practice is most concentrated in the central Indian state of Madhya Pradesh.

Lower caste groups associated with intergenerational prostitution include the Banchhada, the Bedias, the Perna caste and the Nat caste. It is believed that such groups were often nomadic in the past and settled into small villages, which were to be known as "Prostitute villages". During the colonial period, such groups were often classified as "criminal tribes" under the Criminal Tribes Act, and often lost their traditional sources of income, such as dancers, under the resulting persecution which forced the women to adopt prostitution. Even though they are now termed Denotified and Nomadic Tribes of India (DNTs), they are still more commonly known to mainstream society as "Criminal Tribes".

Among the Bacchara, according to Monalika Tiwari, a social worker with the organization Jan Sahas, men are generally not expected to work, while at least one girl in most families is expected to become a prostitute instead of getting married. Girls are married or enter sex work between 10 and 12, and most turn into sex work before they are 18. While boys are often preferred to girls in the country, with sex-selective abortions causing a skewed gender ratio, the birth of girls among some low-caste villages built around prostitution is celebrated as the arrival of future breadwinners. They are groomed by their own families into prostitution, often from birth, with reports of younger girls stowed under beds to observe others at work. The younger the girl, the higher the price tends to be for sexual services. The girls often have their virginity auctioned to the highest bidder. Some girls are injected with oxytocin to make their breasts grow faster. Among the Perna caste, girls are married after puberty and are physically abused if they then resist going into prostitution by their in-laws, who expect their son's wife to contribute to the family finances. Among the Bedia, girls are introduced to the profession soon as they reach puberty. Members of these communities are also involved in kidnapping and raising girls from other communities in order to bolster their income.

Devadasi is a female dedicated for the rest of her life to a deity and were expected to offer sexual services to the temples' patrons. They originated from the non-Brahmin lower castes and those of the outcaste Scheduled Castes, who are sometimes referred to as "Jogini".

=== Korea ===
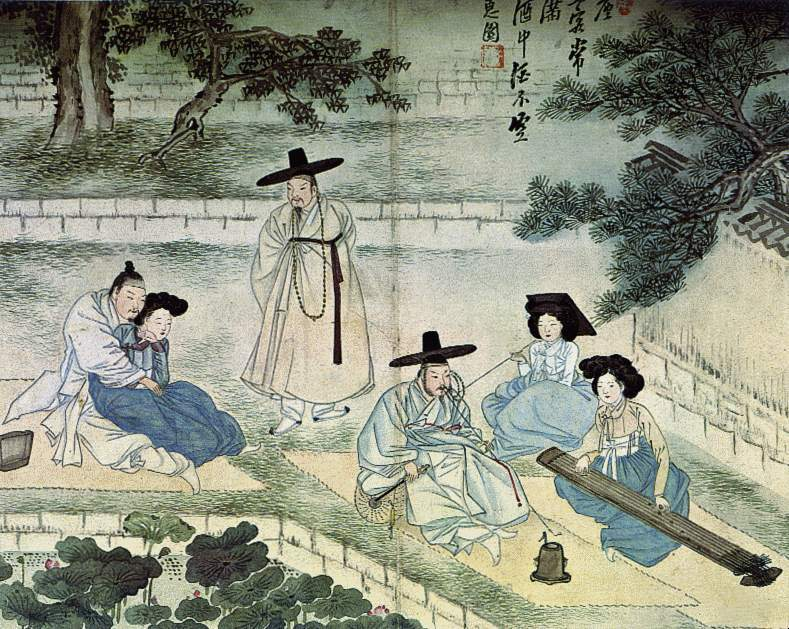
Kisaeng women from outcast or slave families

In pre-modern Korea, the Kisaeng were women from the lower caste Cheonmin who were trained to provide entertainment, conversation, and sexual services to men of the upper class.

=== Nepal ===
In Nepal, the Badi people are known to be traditionally involved with prostitution. After the 14th century, the Badis received land and money for providing concubines to small-time rulers in western Nepal. After 1950, local royalty lost power in a pro-democracy movement. Thus, the Badis saw their clientele disappear, and they eventually turned to prostitution.
