= National Debt Redemption Movement Memorial Park =

Park in Daegu, South Korea

- Interactive map of National Debt Redemption Movement Memorial Park
- Location: Jung District, Daegu, South Korea
- Coordinates: 35°52′7″N 128°36′7″E
- Area: 4.25 hectares (10.5 acres)
- Website: www.gukchae.com

Korean name
- Hangul: 국채보상운동기념공원
- Hanja: 國債報償運動記念公園
- RR: Gukchae bosang undong ginyeom gongwon
- MR: Kukch'ae posang undong kinyŏm kongwŏn

National Debt Redemption Movement Memorial Park (Korean: 국채보상운동기념공원), alternatively National Debt or Gukchae Park, is a park that is located in Jung District, Daegu, South Korea. Construction of the park began in March 1998 and was completed in December 1999. It has an area of 42,500 square metres (457,000 ft^{2}).

It is named for and commemorates the 1907–1908 National Debt Repayment Movement (국채보상운동), an act of the Korean independence movement, when the country was indirectly ruled through the Japanese Resident-General of Korea. The movement started in Daegu. It also commemorates the 1998 gold-collecting campaign during the 1997 Asian financial crisis.

It contains walking areas, green spaces, and other amenities. There is an underground parking lot for visitors. The Dalgubeol Grand Bell was installed in a pavilion in the park in December 1998. It also has memorials to several figures in Korean history.

The National Debt Redemption Movement Memorial Museum opened in the park on October 5, 2011. It has two stories above ground and two stories below ground.
