= Aengmu =

- Hangul: 앵무
- Hanja: 鸚鵡
- Revised Romanization: Aengmu
- McCune–Reischauer: Aengmu

Aengmu was the working name of a famed kisaeng of Daegu in the early 20th century. The name literally means "parrot." She was a leading donor to the National Debt Repayment Movement, a campaign that aimed to keep Korea out of Japanese control by reducing Korea's debt to Japan.

Donating 100 won to the cause in 1907, she explained that it was inappropriate for her to donate more than a man; but if a man donated more, she would also donate more, even unto death.

Her real name is not known; neither are her dates of birth and death.

== Notes ==
- Daegu-Gyeongbuk Historical Research Society, p. 219.

== See also ==
- Korean independence movements
- History of Korea
