= Kisaeng =

Historical courtesans in Korea

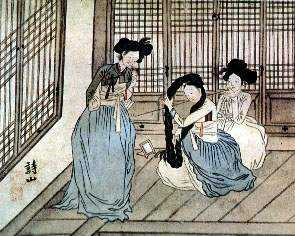

Korean name
- Hangul: 기생
- Hanja: 妓生
- RR: gisaeng
- MR: kisaeng

Kisaeng (Korean: 기생; Hanja: 妓生), also called ginyeo (기녀; 妓女), were enslaved women from outcast or enslaved families who were trained to be courtesans, providing artistic entertainment and conversation to men of upper class. First emerging in the Goryeo dynasty, kisaeng were officially sanctioned by the state and employed in various public functions. While many worked in royal courts, others were stationed throughout the provinces.

Trained in music, dance, poetry, and prose, kisaeng were often highly educated and skilled in the fine arts. Despite their low social status, they were respected as cultured artists. In addition to entertainment, some were assigned duties in medicine and needlework.

Kisaeng hold an important place in the traditional cultural memory of the Joseon dynasty. Although most individual kisaeng have faded from history, a few are remembered for their talents, intelligence, or loyalty. The most renowned among them is Hwang Jini, a celebrated 16th-century kisaeng known for her poetry and wit.

== Social position ==
Throughout the Goryeo and Joseon periods, kisaeng held the status of cheonmin, the lowest in society. They shared this status with other entertainers, as well as butchers and slaves. Status was hereditary, so the children of a kisaeng were also of cheonmin status, and daughters automatically became kisaeng as well. Beginning in the Goryeo period, the governing offices in each district kept a registry of kisaeng, to ensure thorough oversight. The same practice was followed for conscripted slaves. Kisaeng could only be released from their position if a hefty price was paid to the government; this could only be done by a wealthy patron, typically a high government official.

Many kisaeng were skilled in poetry, and numerous sijo composed by kisaeng have survived. These often reflect themes of heartache and parting, similar to poems composed by scholars in exile. In addition, some of the most famous kisaeng poems were composed to persuade prominent scholars to spend the night. The sijo style later came to be associated with kisaeng women, while women of yangban status focused on the gasa form.

Kisaeng attached to a local government office were known as gwan-gi, and their status was differentiated from that of the common slaves also attached to the office. They were separately entered on the census rolls. The kisaeng were regarded as of significantly higher status than the slaves, although technically they were all of cheonmin rank.

Though they were of low social class, the kisaeng held a unique role in ancient Korea's society, and were respected for their career as educated artists and writers. For this reason, they were sometimes spoken of as "possessing the body of the lower class but the mind of the aristocrat" and as having a "paradoxical identity as a socially despised yet popularly (unofficially) acclaimed artist". Not all kisaeng engaged in prostitution as different groups or tiers of kisaeng had different educations and roles. Numerous accounts report individual kisaeng as specializing specifically in arts, music, poetry, and conversation skills.

== Career ==
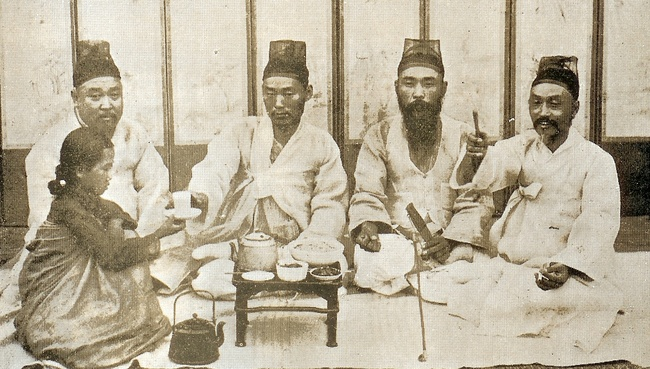
A kisaeng girl of Joseon, in 1910

The career of most kisaeng was very short, generally peaking at age 16 or 17, and over by age 22. Only a few kisaeng were able to maintain their business for very long beyond this time. It may be for this reason that the kisaeng training institutes accepted entrants as young as eight. All kisaeng were obliged by law to retire at age 50. The best prospect most kisaeng had for long-term support was through becoming the concubine of a patron. However, even this was not an option unless their patron first purchased them from the state, which few men of the Joseon period could afford. Thus, most former kisaeng went on to work in or manage a local tavern.

In the later period of Joseon, a three-tiered system developed. The highest tier was occupied by ilp'ae (일패; 一牌) who sang and danced at upper-class feasts. Ilp'ae kisaeng were not permitted to entertain after they turned 30. However, they could continue working in other duties, such as dressmaking and medicine, until the age of 50. They received guests only by choice. The haengsu (행수; 行首) of each district, who was the leader of the kisaeng, took charge of discipline and training new kisaeng.

Kisaeng of the lowest tier were called samp'ae (삼패; 三牌). The samp'ae were forbidden to perform the songs and dances of the ilp'ae. The three-tiered system, like other aspects of Joseon class division, broke down in the late 19th century.

In the course of their careers, some kisaeng were able to amass considerable personal wealth. However, these were the exception. Kisaeng were required to meet their expenses, including food, clothes, and makeup, out of their own personal funds.

== Becoming a kisaeng ==
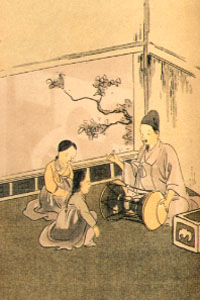
Young kisaeng receiving musical instruction, c. 1910

Women entered the kisaeng class through various paths. Some were the daughters of kisaeng, who inherited their mother's status. Others were sold into the class by families who could not afford to support them. Most such families were of cheonmin rank, but sometimes poor families of higher status sold their children in this fashion. On occasion, even women from the yangban aristocracy were made kisaeng, usually because they had violated the strict sexual mores of the Joseon period.

As kisaeng were skilled workers from the beginning, the government took an early interest in ensuring correct education. This first emerged with the establishment of gyobang, training institutes for palace kisaeng during the Goryeo period. During the Joseon period, this became further codified, with instruction focusing on music and dance.

In the three-tiered system of later Joseon, more specialized training schools were established for kisaeng of the first tier. The course of study lasted three years and covered poetry, dance, music, and art. The most advanced such school was located in Pyongyang. This system continued well into the Japanese colonial period, during which time the schools training kisaeng were known as gwonbeon (권번).

== Daily life ==
As slaves of the government, the lives of kisaeng were closely regulated. They were overseen by the officer in charge of kisaeng, known as the hojang. The hojang was also in charge of maintaining the kisaeng register, and ensuring that none of the district's kisaeng had fled. Kisaeng were required to answer the requests of patrons, unless they had previously notified the hojang. The kisaeng of the district were expected to appear for inspection twice a month and also when a new official arrived in the area. In addition, they were required to report for continuing education, usually focused on music and dance. The frequency and content of this training varied from region to region.

However, the detailed affairs of the kisaeng were not directly overseen by the state. Order was kept within each gyobang, which might include some tens of kisaeng, by the haengsu kisaeng, those of the highest tier. When problems arose between a kisaeng and a client, or when charges of criminal conduct were made against a kisaeng, the haengsu kisaeng usually took the leading role in resolving the situation.

In addition, most kisaeng had a gibu, or "kisaeng husband", who provided protection and economic support, such as buying them valuable things or granting them social status in return for entertainment. Most gibu were former soldiers, government enforcers, or servants of the royal household. At times, there was friction between would-be customers and possessive gibu, although the gibu was not the kisaeng's husband and had no legal claim to her. The role of the gibu changed over time; at first, many kisaeng in government service had no such patron. However, by the late Joseon dynasty, the gibu system was more or less universal.

In the Joseon dynasty, kisaeng houses were typically located near the center of a town, often close to the marketplace. They were laid out to create a welcoming effect; in many cases, a location was chosen with a fine view, and the area around the house would be landscaped with ornamental pools and plantings.

== Politics and diplomacy ==
Kisaeng played a number of important political roles, as servants of the state and in their own right.

Thanks to their frequenting the taverns and guest-houses of the town, kisaeng were often among the most knowledgeable on local affairs. For this reason, they were at times a key source of intelligence. It was through information supplied by kisaeng that the rebel army of Hong Gyeong-nae was able to easily take the fortress of Jongju in the early 19th century.

When cities fell, as many of Korea's cities did during the 1592–1598 Japanese invasions of Korea, kisaeng were often made to entertain the generals of the victorious army. Some of Korea's most famous kisaeng, including Nongae of Jinju, are remembered today for their bravery in killing or attempting to kill leaders of the imperial Japanese army.

Some kisaeng were also active in the Korean independence movements of the early 20th century. In this they resembled other women of Joseon, who often took a leading role in the independence struggle. Aengmu, a kisaeng of Daegu, was a major donor to the National Debt Repayment Movement in the early 20th century. Some fifty kisaeng of Jinju took part in a demonstration as part of the March 1st Movement in 1919.

== Regional differences ==
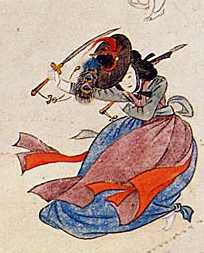
Jinju kisaeng specialized in the sword dance.

Kisaeng seem to have been relatively few in number, at the most a few thousand. They were spread throughout the country, with a few hundred in the larger centers and smaller numbers in the hyeon villages. They were also found in the "stations" and inns which provided food and shelter to travelers along the country's arterial roads, such as the Great Yeongnam Road.

The number and characteristics of the kisaeng varied greatly from region to region. During the Joseon period, the city with the most kisaeng by far was Seoul, then called Hanseong, with perhaps 1000. Many of these worked for the court, and helped to fill the vast number of trained entertainers needed for grand festivals. Beautiful or talented kisaeng were often taken from the provinces to Seoul. The required training for kisaeng in Seoul was regular and very strict, with inattentive kisaeng sent home.

There were also large numbers of kisaeng in the old capitals of Kaesong and Pyongyang. The kisaeng of Pyongyang were noted for their high level of skill and beauty. The kisaeng school of Pyongyang was one of the country's most advanced, and continued operating until late in the colonial period. The kisaeng of Pyongyang were also known for their ability to recite the kwan san yung ma, a song by the 18th-century composer Sin Kwangsu.

Other large concentrations existed around military camps, particularly along the northern border. For instance, in the time of Sejong the Great in the 15th century, there were some sixty kisaeng attached to the army base at Yongbyon. In these areas, kisaeng essentially filled the role of wives for the army and their role was commensurately more focused on domestic tasks than entertainment.

The kisaeng of other regions also maintained distinctive local identities. The kisaeng of Jinju were particularly adept at the Geommu, a traditional sword dance. Those of Jeju were known for their equestrian prowess. In many cases, the noted skills of a region's kisaeng corresponded with some other local claim to fame. The kisaeng of the Gwandong region on the east coast, home to many famous sights including Mount Kumgang, memorized the gwan dong byeol gok (관동별곡; 關東別曲), a poem recounting their region's scenery. Those of the Honam region in the southwest were trained in pansori, while those of the seonbi city Andong could recite the Great Learning (Daxue; Daehak) by heart.

== History ==
Official histories of Korea do not mention kisaeng often. They enter only occasionally into official records such as the Goryeosa or Veritable Records of the Joseon Dynasty. For example, the Royal Protocols, or Ŭigwe (의궤; 儀軌), records names of those who worked to prepare for important court rituals, and some kisaeng are listed as needleworkers. Yet references to kisaeng are quite widespread in the yadam or "anecdotal histories" of later Joseon and Silhak thinkers such as Yi Ik and Chŏng Yagyong, known as Tasan, who gave some thought to their role and station in society. A few records of kisaeng that exist are used in the study of their history, such as Joseon Haeeohwhasa (조선해어화사; 朝鮮解語花史), Nogpajapgi (녹파잡기; 綠派雜記), and Joseon miinbogam (조선미인보감; 朝鮮美人寶鑑), the last one being written in the Japanese colonial period. Even today, many formal histories of Korea pay little or no heed to the story of the kisaeng. For example, Lee Ki-baik's New History of Korea does not contain a single reference to the kisaeng.

=== Origins ===
There are various theories concerning the origin of the kisaeng. The first such theory was formulated by the scholar Tasan, and theories have multiplied as the kisaeng themselves have receded further into the past.

One theory actually places their origins in the Silla, among the wonhwa, female predecessors of the hwarang. However, there is little to suggest a concrete link between Silla's wonhwa and the later kisaeng. Also, the wonhwa seem to have been chosen from among the aristocracy, whereas kisaeng were always members of the lower classes. For these reasons, few contemporary scholars support this theory.

Many others trace their origins to the early years of Goryeo, when many people were displaced following the end of the Later Three Kingdoms period in 936. At this time, a large number of Baekje people wandered the country. It is not clear whether this nomadic lifestyle was already established, or a consequence of the recent turmoil. In fact, a connection between these wanderers and the nomadic tribes of Manchuria has been conjectured. The first king of Goryeo, Taejo, considered these wanderers to be a threat to the stability of the state. He ordered that they be made into slaves of the government. Although no certain records exist, it is likely that the first kisaeng were drawn from these former wanderers.

=== Goryeo ===
Regardless of their origins, kisaeng first emerged as a class and rose to prominence during the Goryeo dynasty, 935–1394. They are first mentioned in the early 11th century. At this time, they were primarily engaged in skilled trades such as needlework, music, and medicine. The female entertainers of the court during this period filled a role similar to that later filled by almost all kisaeng.

Due to the growth of the kisaeng class, during the reign of Myeongjong the state began to keep records (called gijeok) of the kisaeng living in each jurisdiction. Around this time, the state also made its first efforts to set up educational institutions to train kisaeng entertainers. These academies were known as gyobang, and first appear in history with their abolition by King Hyeonjong in 1010. However, they were re-established in the reign of Chungnyeol. The gyobang provided training in the dangak and sogak musical styles.

The women trained in the gyobang were exclusively court entertainers. Their role in the affairs of the court became increasingly important as the dynasty progressed. They entertained both the king and visiting dignitaries, a role which continued into the Joseon period. In addition, beginning in the reign of Munjong, they performed at official ceremonies of the state.

Just as the origin of the kisaeng is unclear, so is their precise relation to other strata of society. The female entertainers who appear in records are exclusively kisaeng of the court, and are recorded as slaves of the government.

=== Joseon dynasty ===
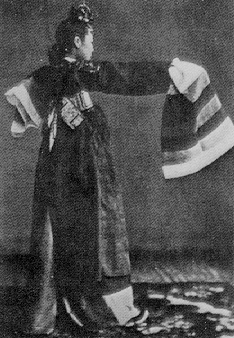
Kisaeng, 1890

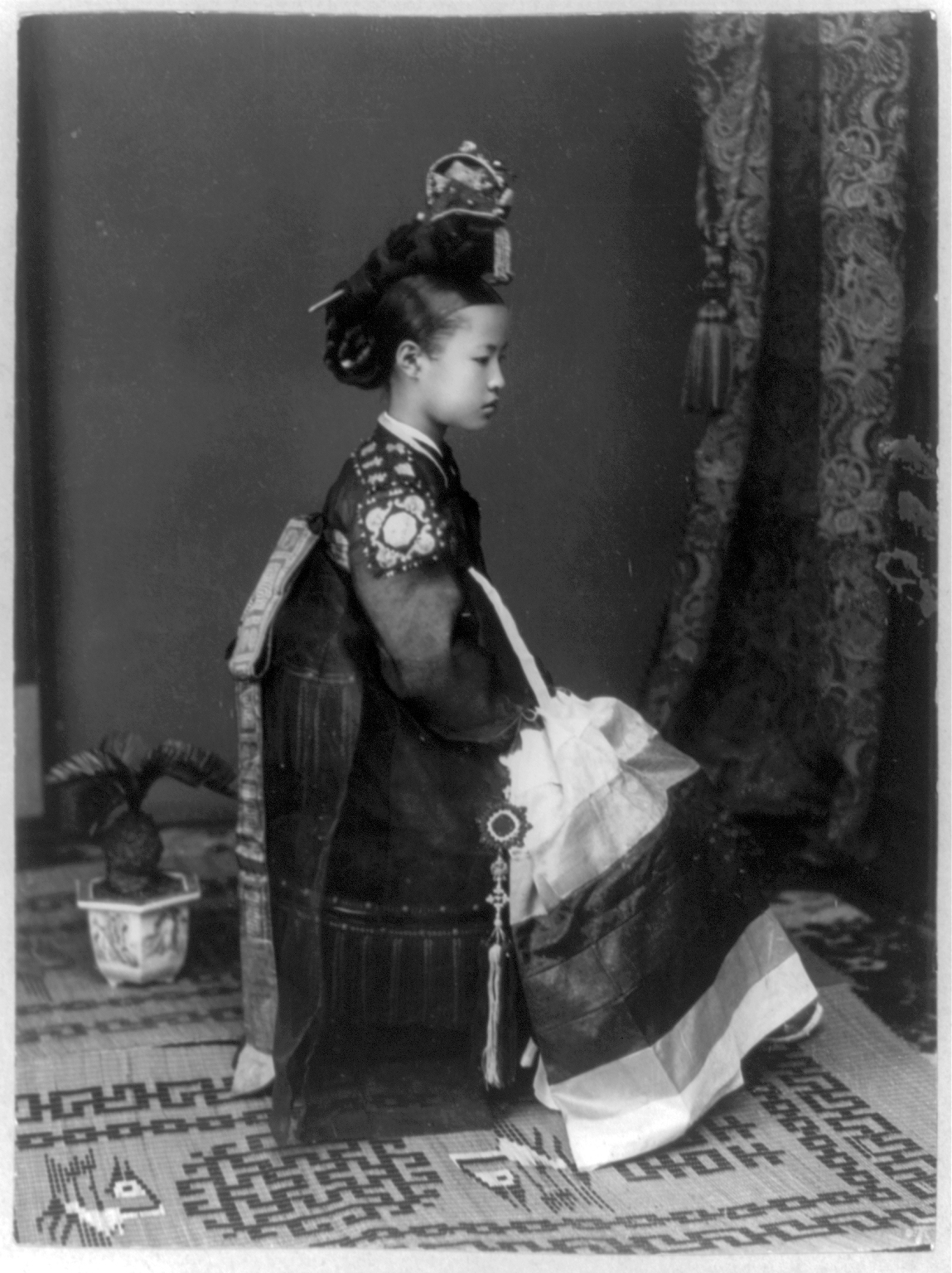
A Kisaeng girl c. 1910

Goryeo was succeeded by the Joseon dynasty, which lasted from 1394 to 1897. During the Joseon dynasty, the kisaeng system continued to flourish and develop, despite the government's deeply ambivalent attitude toward it.

Joseon was founded on Korean Confucianism, and these scholars of the time took a very dim view of professional women and of the kisaeng class in particular. There were many calls for the abolition of the kisaeng, or for their exclusion from court, but these were not successful—perhaps because of the influence of the women themselves, or perhaps because of fear that officials would take to stealing the wives of other men. One such proposal was made during the reign of Sejong the Great, but when an advisor of the court suggested that the abolition of the class would lead to government officials committing grave crimes, the king chose to preserve the kisaeng.

During the brief and violent reign of Yeonsangun between 1494 and 1506, kisaeng became symbolic of royal excess. Yeonsan-gun treated women as primarily objects of pleasure, and made even the medicinal kisaeng (yakbang gisaeng) into entertainers. Yeonsan-gun brought 1,000 women and girls from the provinces to serve as palace kisaeng; many of them were paid from the public treasury. He may have been the first to institute a formal hierarchy among them, dividing the kisaeng of the palace into "Heaven", those with whom he slept, and "Earth", those who served other functions.

In 1650, all kisaeng were made slaves of the government. The kisaeng attached to a government office were known as gwan-gi, or "kisaeng of the office". Their role did not, by law, include sexual service to the officeholder; in fact, government officials could be punished severely for consorting with a kisaeng. However, in practice kisaeng were often forced to serve the officeholder. A distinction was sometimes made between those gwan-gi who were obliged to sleep with the officeholder, and those who were not. This distinction was featured in the popular play Chunhyangga.

The Gabo Reform of 1895 officially abolished the class system of Joseon dynasty, and slavery as well. From that year forward, all kisaeng became nominally free, and the gwan-gi no longer belonged to the government. In practice, many kisaeng, like many other slaves, continued in servitude for many years. In addition, many of those who were freed had no alternative career; they continued as entertainers, now without the protections afforded by kisaeng status. During the subsequent decade, many of these kisaeng went elsewhere to work.

=== Japanese colonial period ===
The kisaeng were considered to be the lowest of the caste system in the Neo-Confucian way of living that had developed in Korea. Kisaeng often composed and sang their own sijo which allowed them to incorporate their emotions and themes into their work. This continued to be a prevalent practice during the Japanese occupation, even as the face of the kisaeng profession underwent drastic changes. One of the prominent sijo poets of the era was Hwang Jin-I, who was considered to be one of the most irresistible kisaeng of her time. A famous sijo poem that is attributed to Jin-I is entitled (정산리 벽계수야), which is rumored to be a humorous comeback to a yangban official who boasted that he could pass through Jin-I’s territory without stopping or being tempted by her. Such elements were not as prevalent in the work of their male counterparts from the same era. The economic depression that Korea faced at the time of the Japanese occupation led to an impoverished female population being exposed to the labor market. The transition from the Sino-Japanese War to colonial Korea helped expand the sex market. Such expansion came in the form of new laws such as the Kisaeng Regulation Order or Kisaeng Tansongnyŏng (기생 단속령; 妓生團束令) enacted in 1908 which forced the kisaeng out of the palace and replaced their pimps with the Japanese police. This led to the kisaeng being grouped with licensed prostitutes, called ch’anggi. As the overtaking of Korea by Japan continued, the kisaeng profession responded to social and economic shifts in fashion, schools, and brothel management. Guilds or groups of kisaeng were changed to gwonbeon, which not only was a group of kisaeng under registration but was also a school to teach young kisaeng mainly traditional art, such as calligraphy, dance, and songs. During the colonial period, the preexisting tiers or structures of kisaeng disappeared, and they were more viewed as relevant to prostitution than before.

Most of the kisaeng of this time performed in restaurants or entertainment houses to earn a living, and they were often seen as a tourist attraction for the Japanese in Korea, especially Seoul. Even though there is information on prostitution within Korean history regarding the kisaeng over the centuries from pre-modern to contemporary times, there is little information on prostitution and the climate that the kisaeng were exposed to during the colonial period. Prior to the Japanese occupation, kisaeng were courtesans, artists, and poets. However, during the 1920s, while Korea remained under Japanese occupation, the role of kisaeng shifted from entertainers to sex workers. This transition allowed the Japanese police to have control over female bodies through the prostitution licensing system that Japan employed. Chang Han, a magazine run largely by kisaeng, discussed the personal lives of a kisaeng in conjunction with their professional ones, stating that before the Japanese occupation, the kisaeng were of lower caste and able to interact with those of a higher caste. However, after the start of the Japanese occupation, the kisaeng had to actively navigate a restructured sex market in colonial Korea. Chang Han also discussed how the kisaeng of the time were able to interweave femininity with the arts, to create a more cultured approach that allowed them to compete with the licensed prostitutes. The publication also spoke of how their clientele were seen as friends, rather than as oppressors, and they often had a working relationship with Japanese law enforcement.

=== Modern Kisaeng ===
==== South Korea ====
The 1970s onward saw kisaeng dances and vocabulary partially preserved in the contemporary Korean dance and theatre scene observed in the gwonbeon, kisaeng schools, that predominated during the Japanese colonial period, between 1910 and 1945. Although true gwŏnbŏn no longer existed, an academic convention developed where students would study privately with former kisaeng or gwŏnbŏn entertainers.

Very few traditional kisaeng houses continue to operate in South Korea, and many traditions and dances are considered to be lost forever. Some South Korean businesses continue to escort visiting foreign business people to a kisaeng house, but these locations are mostly modern interpretations of old kisaeng houses. The oldest traditional kisaeng house in Korea, Ohjinam (오진암), was closed in 2010. Today, the kisaeng's evolution and impact on Korean society is receiving new attention as Koreans increase efforts to rediscover and revitalize their cultural and historical heritage. However, this interest is focused almost entirely on the historical kisaeng of the Joseon period, and not on the traces of the kisaeng which endure today.

Prostitution is illegal in South Korea.

In North Korea, according to journalist Barbara Demick, all kisaeng descendants were labelled as members of a "hostile class" and considered to have "bad songbun", i.e. "tainted blood". By contrast, historian Suzy Kim has documented how former kisaeng were an important subgroup of the women organized in the Korean Democratic Women's Union in the decades following the country's foundation and how they openly shared experiences of exploitation under Japanese colonial rule. This was particularly remarkable because "these women were situated at the bottom of the social hierarchy, rarely treated as part of the working class, even by labor organizers". Prostitution is illegal in North Korea.

== Literary and artistic depictions ==
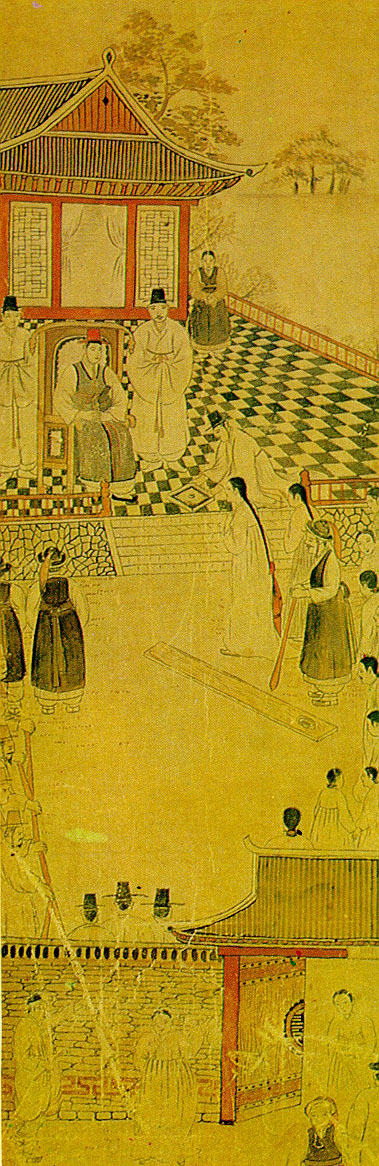
Chunhyang before the magistrate, from an anonymous Joseon dynasty painting

Kisaeng have played important roles in Korean popular literature since the mid-Joseon dynasty. As popular literature such as novels and pansori emerged, kisaeng often took a leading role. This was in part due to their unique role as women who could move freely in society. Kisaeng appear as heroines in stories such as Chunhyangga, and as important figures in many other Joseon-era narratives.

Kisaeng also began to appear in the vernacular art of later Joseon. They are particularly common in the work of the famed early 19th-century painter Hyewon, whose work focused on both the life of the cheonmin, including kisaeng, and erotic themes. During the colonial period, kisaeng were a popular object to Japanese and Korean painters, and postcards with the picture of Korean kisaeng were circulated in Japan.

=== Modern depictions and influence ===
Kisaeng continue to be central to the understanding and imagining of Joseon culture in contemporary South and North Korea. For example, the female lead in the film Chi-hwa-seon was a kisaeng, the companion of painter Owon. Modern portrayals often differ from earlier historical depictions by emphasizing individual agency, artistic identity, and the social constraints associated with kisaeng.

While modern depictions are more limited in the North due to the political legacy surrounding the abolition of the kisaeng system, several South Korean films reinterpret the figure of the kisaeng through contemporary perspectives. Hwang Jin-yi and Chunhyang (2000) depict female protagonists navigating restrictive social hierarchies while pursuing artistic and personal autonomy. Love, Lies (2016) portrays performers during the Japanese colonial period and highlights tensions between traditional music and emerging modern influences. Homme Fatale presents a gender reversed interpretation of the kisaeng role through a male protagonist.

The legacy of kisaeng has also been discussed in relation to contemporary South Korean popular culture. Elements of their artistic training, including dance, musical performance, and cultivated public persona, are sometimes compared to aspects of the modern entertainment industry, particularly K-pop. Scholars have noted that the concept of highly trained performers entertaining audiences reflects a recurring cultural pattern, with historical precedents in the kisaeng tradition.

Similar to the historical gwonbeon system, K-pop trainees undergo structured and often rigorous training in both performance skills and public presentation. This comparison has been further explored in academic scholarship, which examines continuities between the gwonbeon system and the modern K-pop training structure, particularly in terms of discipline, aesthetic standardization, and labor organization. While differing in historical context, both systems have emphasized intensive preparation and the cultivation of talent and appearance as key factors in determining success and public reception.

== Literary and artistic works by kisaeng ==
Not very many works by kisaeng are extant to this day. While many were accomplished artists in their time, it is likely that their work was not deemed valuable enough to keep or store. A large amount of their poetry survive, Hwang Jin-I being one of the most famous kisaeng poets (Book: Songs of the Kisaeng: courtesan poetry of the last Korean dynasty). While very little of their painting survive, the National Museum of Korea has thirteen of Juk-hyang's paintings of plants and flowers. In the Japanese colonial period, though the education of gwonbeon still focused on traditional music and performance, the scope of their art expanded along with the cultural changes of society to include both folk genres and Japanese music. The transmission of many songs and dances, albeit some with modification, were through the kisaeng of this period.

== Famous kisaeng ==
Notable kisaeng include:

- Hwang Chini, musician and intellectual of Gaeseong.
- Chu-hyang, Sim Yook's lover, best female poet during her time.
- Ga Hee-ah, a classical dancer and singer of the Joseon Dynasty, and a concubine of Yi Bang-won.
- Juk-hyang, kisaeng during Sunjo, painter and Kim Chŏnghŭi's lover.
- Yi Mae-chang, poet of Buan
- Seol-mae, noted wit.
- Non Gae, remembered for killing a Japanese general during the battle of Jinju.
- Gyewolhyang, who attempted to have the Japanese general Konishi Yukinaga killed in Pyongyang.
- Sangchunrim, kisaeng of Seoul during Jungjong, associated with many scholars: Sin Jong-ho, Jeong Sa-yong, Hong Eon-pil, Kim Han-guk, and Jeong Sun-yeong.
- Du-hyang, lover of T'oegye Yi Hwang, committed suicide in a river in her hometown Danyang after T'oegye's death. Her tomb still stands near where she committed suicide.
- Gang-a, kisaeng of Jeolla during Seonjo, Chŏng Ch'ŏl's lover.
- Man-hyang of Hamheung
- Yuji of Hwangju
- Kim Ja-ya, the last classically trained kisaeng in South Korea.
- Lee Hwajungseon, a kisaeng who gave an interview, that was unprecedented at that time, on the March 1923 issue of Contemporary Review.
- Wang Su-bok, the most popular singer in Korea in 1935.
- Lee Nan-hyang, a South Korean classical singer, dancer and musician. She had worked as a music teacher and was also a record singer.

== See also ==
- Ca trù, a similar profession in Vietnam
- Caste in the sex industry
- Geisha, a similar profession in Japan
- Kanhopatra
- Kippumjo
- Tawaif, a similar profession during colonial India

== Notes ==
=== Works cited ===
- Ahn, Gil-jeong (안길정) (2000). 조선시대 생활사 (Joseon Sidae Saenghwalsa) (Lifestyle history of the Joseon period). Seoul: Sakyejul. ISBN 978-89-7196-701-0. (In two volumes).
- Breen, Michael (2004). The Koreans (rev. ed.). New York: Thomas Dunne Books. ISBN 978-0-312-32609-8.
- Daegu-Gyeongbuk Historical Research Society (대구-경북 역사연구회) (1999). 역사 속의 대구, 대구 사람들 (Yeoksa sogui Daegu, Daegu saramdeul) (Daegu and its people in history). Seoul: Jungsim. ISBN 978-89-89524-09-0.
- Hwang, Won-gap (황원갑) (1997). 한국사를 바꾼 여인들 (Hanguksareul bakkun yeonindeul) (The women who changed Korean history). Seoul: 책이있는마을. ISBN 978-89-5639-014-7.
- Kim, Dong-uk. (1963). Women's literary achievements (Yi Dynasty). Korea Journal 3(11), 33–36. (Link: search author's name in the box in the middle of the page; do not change language or search in the top of the page, which will lead to an external site)
- Kim, Yung Chung (1976). Women of Korea: A history from ancient times to 1945. Seoul: Ewha Womans University Press. ISBN 978-89-7300-116-3.
- Lee, Younghee (2002). Ideology, culture and han: Traditional and early modern Korean women's literature. Seoul: Jimoondang. ISBN 978-89-88095-43-0.
- McCann, David. (1974). Traditional world of kisaeng. Korea Journal 14(2), 40–43. (Link: search author's name in the box in the middle of the page; do not change language or search in the top of the page, which will lead to an external site)
- Song, Bang-song (1999). Korean music: Historical and other aspects. Seoul: Jimoondang. ISBN 978-89-88095-13-3.
