= Gwonbeon =

Early 20th century schools to train female Korean entertainers

- Hangul: 권번
- Hanja: 券番
- Revised Romanization: Gwonbeon
- McCune–Reischauer: Kwŏnbŏn

Gwonbeon (Korean: 권번) were institutions set up for the training and oversight of kisaeng and other entertainers in the early 20th century. They were the successors of the gyobang, government-supported institutions which had provided such education and oversight in the Goryeo and Joseon dynasties.

== See also ==
- Education in Korea (disambiguation)
- Gisaeng
