= AdultVest =

American investment management company

AdultVest, Inc. is an investment management company based in Beverly Hills, California. It was founded in 2005 by former hedge fund specialist Francis Koenig as an institutional investment company focusing exclusively on sex industry-related investments.

Only accredited investors may invest in the fund and it caters to investors willing to invest more than one million dollars. The firm is a former winner of the Hedge Fund Launch of the Year Award.

== Accusation ==
In January 2009, The Atlantic reported Koenig stating that AdultVest had made a 50% return. The Business Insider stated that they were "deeply skeptical" about Koenig's claim of a 50% return because when they asked him how the company had made the money, Koenig referred to "valuing assets like iPhone porn startups and unsold domain names".

== Exoneration ==
According to private equity source, FINAlternatives, and the SEC's exoneration letter referenced in the article, Koenig was misquoted. The actual 50% claim was, instead, a 50% increase in the per unit buy-in price based on the fund's progress.

The SEC reviewed the company and concluded that all funds were correctly accounted for, and the fraud case was closed in April 2010, with Koenig being exonerated in an official letter.

== See also ==
- Bad Dragon
