= Kyobang =

Historical centers for kisaeng in Korea

- Hangul: 교방
- Hanja: 敎坊
- Revised Romanization: gyobang
- McCune–Reischauer: kyobang

The gyobang (Korean: 교방) were the principal buildings associated with kisaeng during the Goryeo and Joseon Dynasties. They provided instruction in music including Hyangak (lit. "village music) and dance, and by the late Joseon dynasty they were also the administrative center of kisaeng society.

Gyobang first appear in historical records in the early 11th century, in the reign of King Hyeonjong. However, since that record describes the king releasing 1,000 kisaeng from the gyobang, it is likely that they date to the 10th century and the formation of the kisaeng class.

When Korea came under Japanese rule in the early 20th century, the gyobang were replaced by gwonbeon. No gyobang survive today, although a handful of pictorial depictions do.

== See also ==
- History of Korea
