= Banchhada =

Caste in central India

Banchhada (or Banchada) is a caste in central India that is traditionally identified with prostitution and other crimes. They are listed as a Scheduled Caste for the purposes of India's reservation system and were formerly classified as a criminal tribe in the British Raj.

The Banchhada are located in the states of Madhya Pradesh and Rajasthan.

== See also ==
- Caste in the sex industry#India
