= Lee Hwajungseon =

Korean singer (1898–1944)

Lee Hwajungseon 이화중선
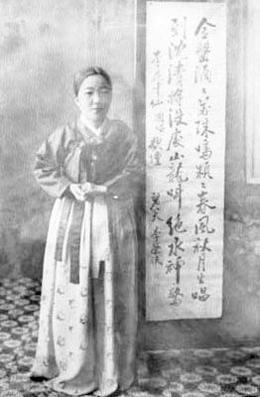
- Portrait of Lee

Background information
- Born: Lee Bong-hak; 1898; Mokpo, South Jeolla Province, Korean Empire
- Died: 1944 (aged 45–46) Omura Bay, Nagasaki, Japan
- Genres: Pansori; Folk
- Occupations: Singer; musician; Folk singer
- Years active: 1913–1944

Lee Hwajungseon (Korean: 이화중선; Hanja: 李花中仙; 1898–1944) was a traditional Korean singer and musician. She studied pansori under Song Man-gap, one of the Five Great Master Singers and perfected her style. Numerous recordings of her work remain. Her specialties were Jeokbyeokga and Chunhyangga.

== Early life ==
Lee Hwajungseon came from a poor family. Her father was a traveling businessman. She received art training at a gwonbeon during her childhood and became a kisaeng. At age fifteen, she began studying singing with Zhang Dezhen.

== Career ==
At age seventeen, Lee was deeply moved by the Hyoryusha dance troupe, which performed in her village. She moved to Seoul and, under the guidance of Song Man-gap and Lee Dong-baek, showed talent, mastering the three major narrative operas: Chunhyanga, Sugunga and Heungboa. In 1923, she participated in a pansori competition held at Gyeongbokgung Palace and became known for singing "Autumn Moon Full Festival," launching a career as a pansori singer.

Lee's rise to fame during the Gyeongbokgung Palace pansori competition inspired other female singers. During the Japanese colonial period, she comforted people's hearts with her songs. After moving to Seoul in 1924, Hwa-jungseon joined the Joseon Kwon Drama Troupe. In 1928, after the death of her husband and teacher, Jang Deok-jin, she moved to Imsil. There, she and her sister, Lee Jung-sun, who was also renowned for her singing, ran a small tavern. The sisters performed at local events as the "Singing Sisters Duo", quickly gaining fame.

In the early 1930s, she married civil engineer Lee Jae-sam. With his financial support, she moved to Seoul alone, where she reached new heights. She recorded "Chunhyangjeon" and "Hungbojeon" for Columbia Records, OK Records, and Victory Records, reaching the pinnacle of female pansori singers through her participation in the "Joseon Vocal Research Association".

== Death ==
Lee died at age 45 when her ferry capsized due to rough seas on her way back to her hometown.

== Commemoration ==
In 2026, EBS television used artificial intelligence to "revive" Lee. The New Year's special program AI Special - Lee Hwajungseon: A Dialogue Across a Century aired on EBS FM on February 17, 2026.

== See also ==
- Music of South Korea
- Japanese colonial period
- Kaesong
