= Denise Brennan =

American anthropologist

Denise Brennan is an American anthropologist, and chair of the Department of Anthropology at Georgetown University. Among other books, she is notable as the author of What’s Love Got to Do with It?: Transnational Desires and Sex Tourism in the Dominican Republic (2004) and Life Interrupted: Trafficking into Forced Labor in the United States (2014), both from Duke University Press. She is also the founder of the Trafficking Survivor Leadership Training Fund, to which she donates those royalties.

Brennan also founded the Gender+ Justice Initiative at Georgetown University. In 2025-26 she was a fellow at the Harvard Radcliffe Institute. She was a fellow at Princeton's Institute for Advanced Study in 2018-19. Brennan is an expert on human migration, sex work, policing, and borders, and has been featured on NBC News, in The Boston Globe, US News & World Report, Rolling Stone, Pacific Standard, on NPR, in The Washington Post, and many other major media outlets.
