= Education in Korea =

Historically, Korea was differently ruled and named. The official records on organised education start with Three Kingdoms period.

- ???-108 BC Old Chosŏn
- 57 BC-668 - epoch of Three Kingdoms: Goguryeo, Baekje and Silla; in fact divided into 4 kingdoms, including also a small kingdom of Gaya
- 668-926 Unified Silla and Balhae
- 918-1392 Goryeo - the national civil service examinations (gwageo) established in 958;
- 1392-1910 Joseon, see Education in the Joseon Dynasty
- 1910-1945 Korea was under Japanese occupation, see: Education in Japanese rule

Since 1945, Korea has been divided into two separate countries

- For North Korea, see Education in North Korea.
- For South Korea, see Education in South Korea.
