= Gold-collecting campaign =

1998 fundraising campaign in South Korea

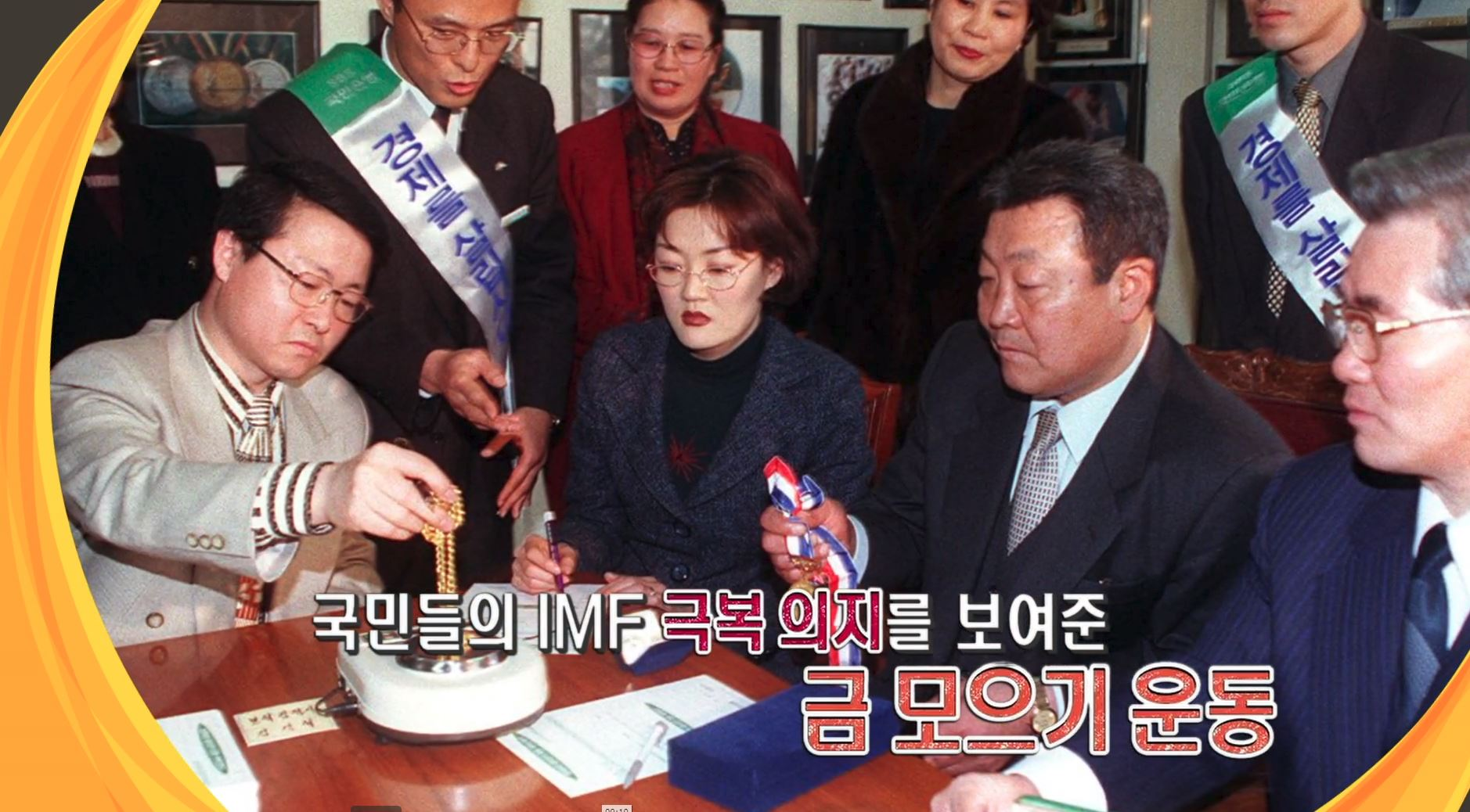
- Korean citizens participating in the gold-collecting campaign. (English translation of the text on the screen: A gold gathering campaign showing the will of the Korean people to overcome the IMF)

Korean name
- Hangul: 금 모으기 운동
- Hanja: 金 모으기 運動
- RR: geum moeugi undong
- MR: kŭm moŭgi undong

In South Korea, the gold-collecting campaign was a national sacrificial movement in early 1998 to repay its debt to the International Monetary Fund. At the time, South Korea had about $304 billion in foreign-exchange debt. The campaign, involving about 3.51 million people nationwide, collected about 227 tons of gold worth about $2.13 billion.

== Background ==
On July 2, 1997, Thailand changed its 13-year-old fixed exchange-rate system. As the exchange rate changed, the price of Thai baht in the foreign-exchange market fell. This was a cause of the East Asian financial crisis. On May 21 of that year, the IMF was asked to provide liquidity-adjustment funds. At the time, the real cause of the foreign-exchange-liquidity problem was controversial. The domestic foreign-exchange market lacked dollars, the South Korean won exchange rate increased, and some financial institutions were unable to repay their foreign debts. Foreign borrowing by financial institutions was blocked, making it difficult to repay a short-term external debt of $30 billion and a long-term external debt of $45 billion. The Kim Dae-jung government persuaded the South Korean people to participate in the Gold-collecting campaign to overcome the nation's debt to the International Monetary Fund. The campaign was reminiscent of the previous "National Debt Repayment Movement". A "one-dollar collection campaign" received little attention. The Korean Broadcasting System proposed a "gold-gathering movement" beginning on January 6, 1998, which received nationwide attention.

== Campaign ==
On November 20, 1997, the 'Patriotic ring collection campaign' declared by the 'Saemaeul Women's Association Central Association', one of the Saemaul Undong organizations, began. Members who wanted to bring about patriotism and unity among the people by inheriting the spirit of the National Debt Redemption Movement, which was carried out to pay off the national debt of the Korean Empire in 1907, collected gold items and donated them to the nation by December 8. It was decided.

The Saemaul Gold Raising Movement spread nationwide thanks to the positive evaluation of the Korean people at the time. The 'KBS Gold Collection Campaign' began on January 5, 1998, and the nature of the movement changed to a compensation system rather than the previous donation system.

On January 5, 1998, KBS1 began the campaign with the Housing Bank. The campaign was developed by a number of media organizations following the KBS report. Gold was received by six banks: Housing Bank, Nonghyup, Kookmin Bank, Korea Exchange Bank, Saemaeul Bank, and Industrial Bank. The campaign had two facets: KBS's "love of nation" and the MBC TV and civic-organization "foreign-debt repayment".

The campaign was conducted from January 5 to April 30, 1998. On January 5, 1998, 3,314 kilograms (7,306 lb) of gold was received in 44,748 consignments. On January 5 the number of participants exceeded 500,000, doubling (to one million) by January 15. The first KBS campaign ended on January 31, with 1,669,555 participants, and the second campaign was held from February 5 to February 21. A total of 314,515 people participated in the second campaign, contributing 19,326 kilograms (42,607 lb). The foreign-debt-repayment campaign led by MBC and consumer and civic groups ran from January 12 to March 14. It had 884,000 participants, and collected 49,603 kilograms (109,356 lb).

The gold-collecting campaign was most active in January, with participation slowing in February. The Ministry of Commerce, Industry and Energy estimated the total number of participants at 3.51 million, with 30 percent of the gold collected during the campaign's first 10 days. Participation continued during February, and MBC and the National Agricultural Cooperative Federation (NACF) led their campaign until March 14. Although the foreign-debt-repayment was extended until April 30, participation decreased significantly after March 14.

Campaign participants were expected to receive a confirmation letter from a professional appraiser for 24-karat gold. After export, its dollar value was determined at the exchange rate and the international gold price and the value later returned in won.

About 225 tons were raised: 165t in January 1998, 53t in February, 5t in March, and 0.8t in April. An equivalent of $2.17 billion was collected, increasing the amount of gold held by the Bank of Korea by 10 to 20 times.

The press disseminated news about the gold-collecting campaign to all social groups, encouraging them to participate. After March, news reports indicated that the campaign hoped to overcome the foreign-exchange crisis and encouraged conformity. The media reported on the participation of companies such as Samsung and Daewoo and individuals such as Lee Jong-bum, President Kim Dae-jung and Lee Kun-hee. They also encouraged participation in the campaign by the general public; Chung Sung-hwan donated the equivalent of ₩500,000.

After March 1998, when the campaign was completed, its performance was reported. The report noted the fact that country could overcome its economic crisis primarily by collecting gold. The campaign emphasized voluntarism and patriotism, and was developed for convenient participation.

== Results ==
At the end of February 1998 five financial institutions (including the Housing Bank and Kookmin Bank) stopped collecting gold, and the NACF ceased its involvement at the end of April. The amount of gold totaled about $1.82 billion in foreign currency. An average of 65 grams (2.3 oz) per household was collected. Twenty-one thousand people contributed 177 kilograms (390 lb) of gold, and 1,735 people consigned 131 kilograms (289 lb) in the form of government bonds. The Housing Bank (KBS-Daewoo) collected the most gold (364t), followed by Nonghyup (MBC-Samsung, 48.23t), Kookmin Bank and Saemaeul Bank (SBS-LG, 33.68t), Korea Exchange Bank (4.25t) and Industrial Bank of Korea (1.98t). The campaign repaid the $19.5 billion in IMF-backed debt in August 2001, three years ahead of schedule.

== Evaluation ==
The gold-collecting campaign is regarded as a driving force for a people to overcome a foreign-exchange crisis. According to a 2017 survey conducted by the Korea Development Institute to assess the impact of the 1997 financial crisis, 54.4 percent of respondents cited national unity as the driving force behind recovery; 42.4 percent noted the IMF crisis, and 15.2 percent cited restructuring and reform efforts.

Contemporary news articles emphasized voluntary participation to overcome a national crisis and shame associated with not self-sacrificing for the country. Emphasizing the patriotism of the Korean people, it blurred the real reasons for the economic crisis with emotional appeals. After the campaign ended, restructuring became an issue. The collective memory of the campaign was used to justify chaebols, labor flexibility, over-consumption, and nostalgia for the Park Chung-hee regime; critical reflection on the event was ignored.

== Gallery ==
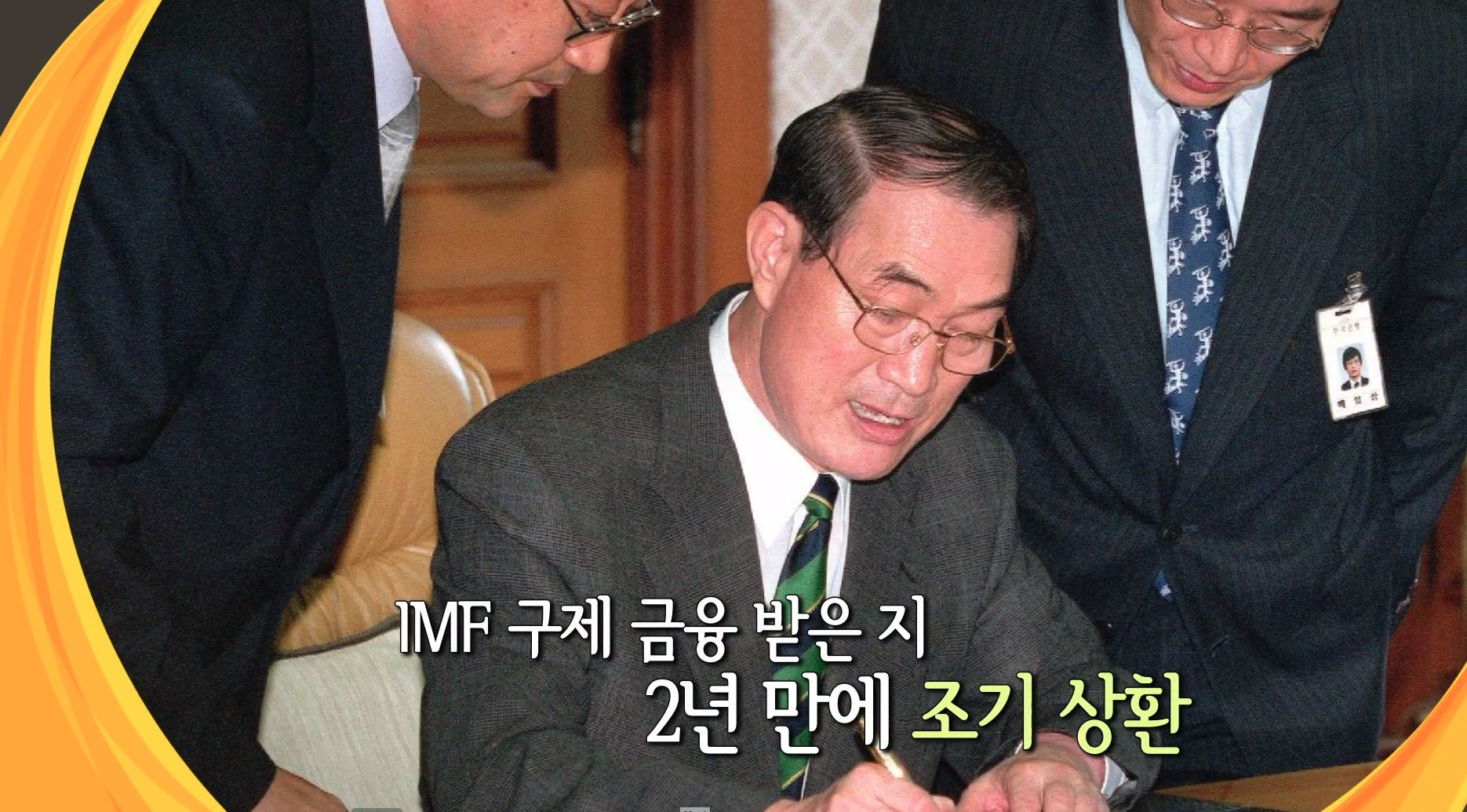
The gold-collecting campaign

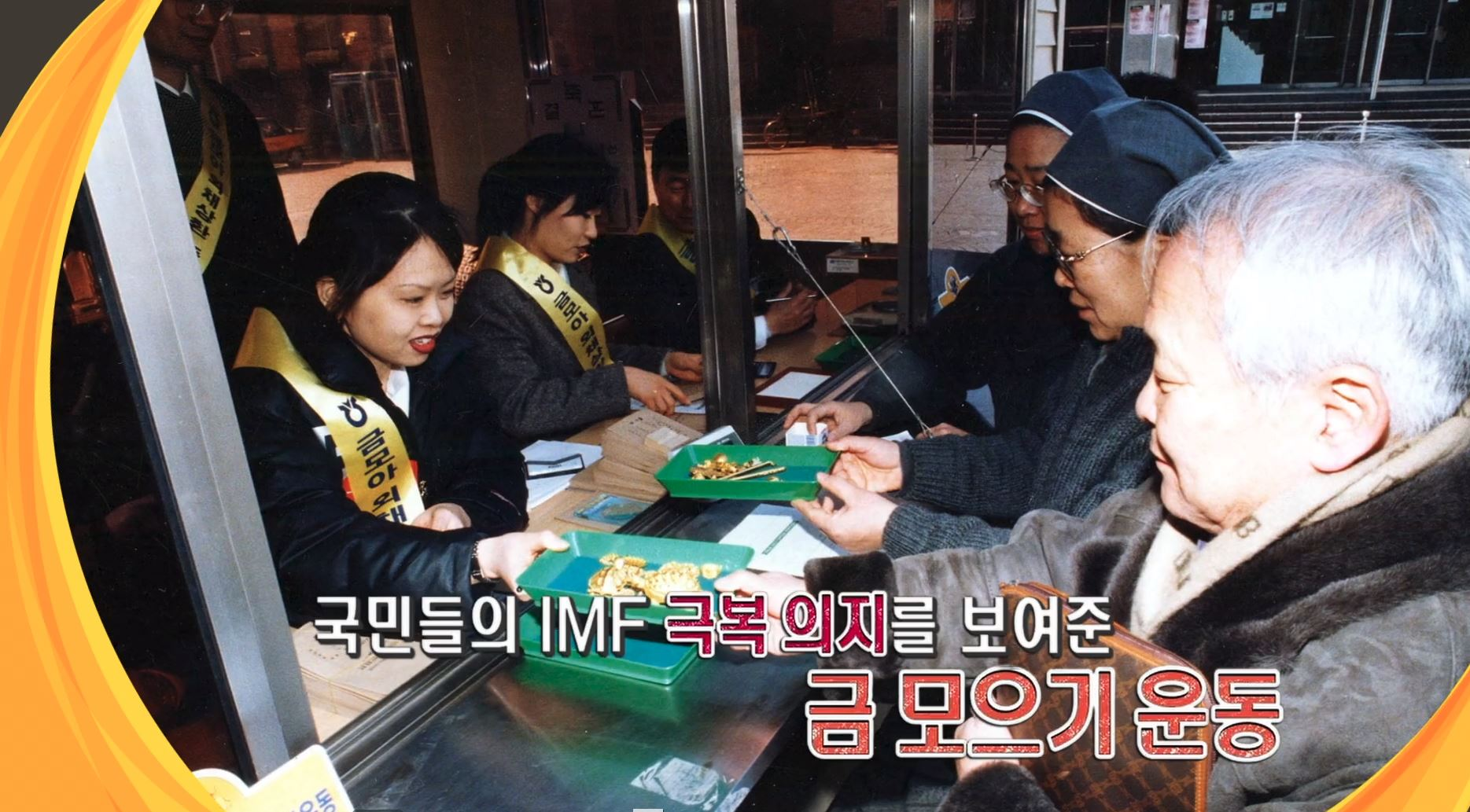
Korean citizens turning in gold

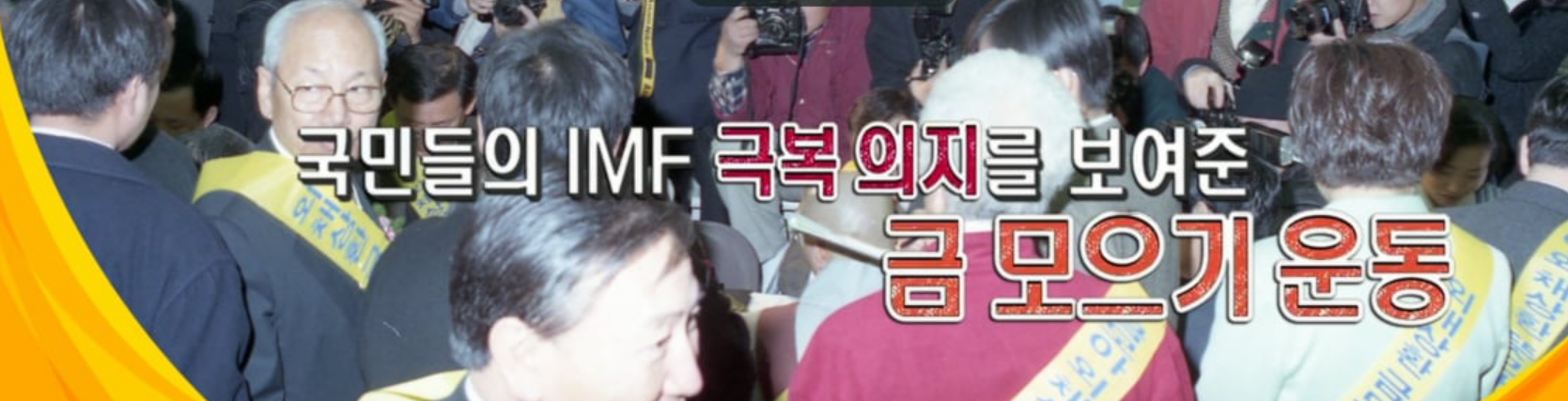
Gold-collecting campaign in South Korea to overcome the debt to the IMF.

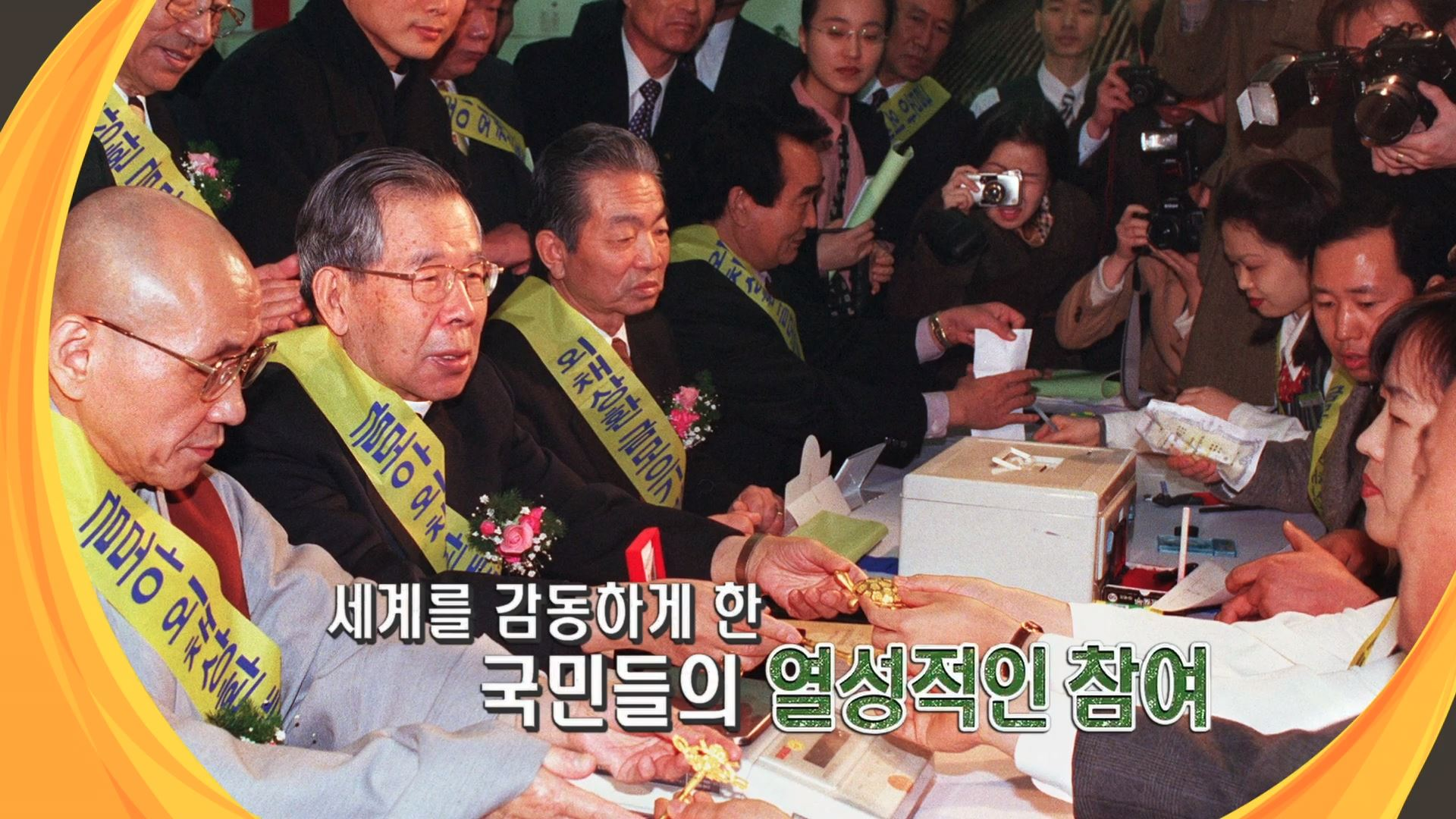
Repayment to IMF, two years early (English Translation about the text on the screen: "Dedicated participation of the people who impressed the world")
