= Seomun Market =

Street market in Daegu, South Korea

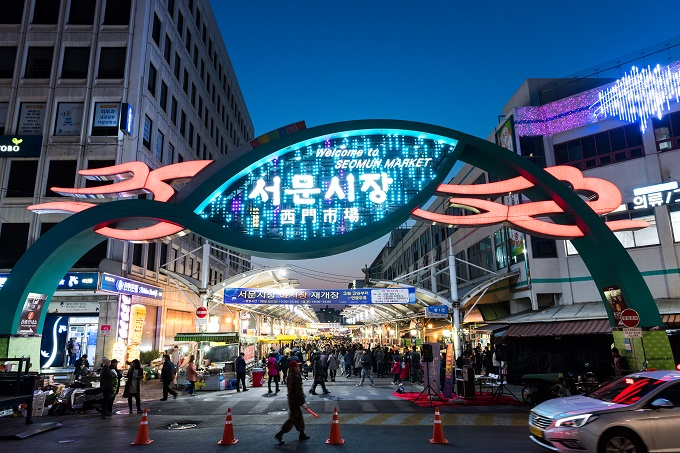
- A market entrance at night (2017)
- Coordinates: 35.86923°N 128.58042°E
- Interactive map of Seomun Market

Korean name
- Hangul: 서문시장
- Hanja: 西門市場
- RR: Seomun sijang
- MR: Sŏmun sijang

Seomun Market (Korean: 서문시장) is the largest traditional street market in Daegu, South Korea, containing more than 4,000 shops. Seomun Market is particularly known as a source for textiles and sewing services, a key ingredient of Daegu's fashion industry.

The name "Seomun" means "west gate," and refers to the location of the market just outside the old west gate of Daegu Castle, which was demolished in 1907. It is also one of the country's oldest markets, dating to a 5-day market held in the area in the late Joseon Dynasty. In the final years of Joseon, Seomun market was one of the country's three largest markets. The market was constituted in its present form in 1920.

Although portions of the market are in the open air or small buildings, most of the shops are in large buildings holding hundreds or thousands of individual shops. The largest of these buildings was Building 2, which was destroyed by fire in late December 2005. Plans for the reconstruction of Building 2, which held the majority of the market's fabric shops, are still being made. There are four other building complexes, and two other large shopping areas. Side streets in the market area also feature a large number of indoor and outdoor food stalls with fish and traditional dishes.

The market can be reached both by Cheongnaeondeok Station on Daegu Metro Line 2 and Seomun Market Station on Daegu Metro Line 3.

On November 30, 2016, a massive fire destroyed all the stores in the market.

Since 2019, the market has been selected every year for the '100 Must-Visit Tourist Spots of Korea,' jointly designated by the Ministry of Culture, Sports and Tourism and the Korea Tourism Organization.

== Gallery ==
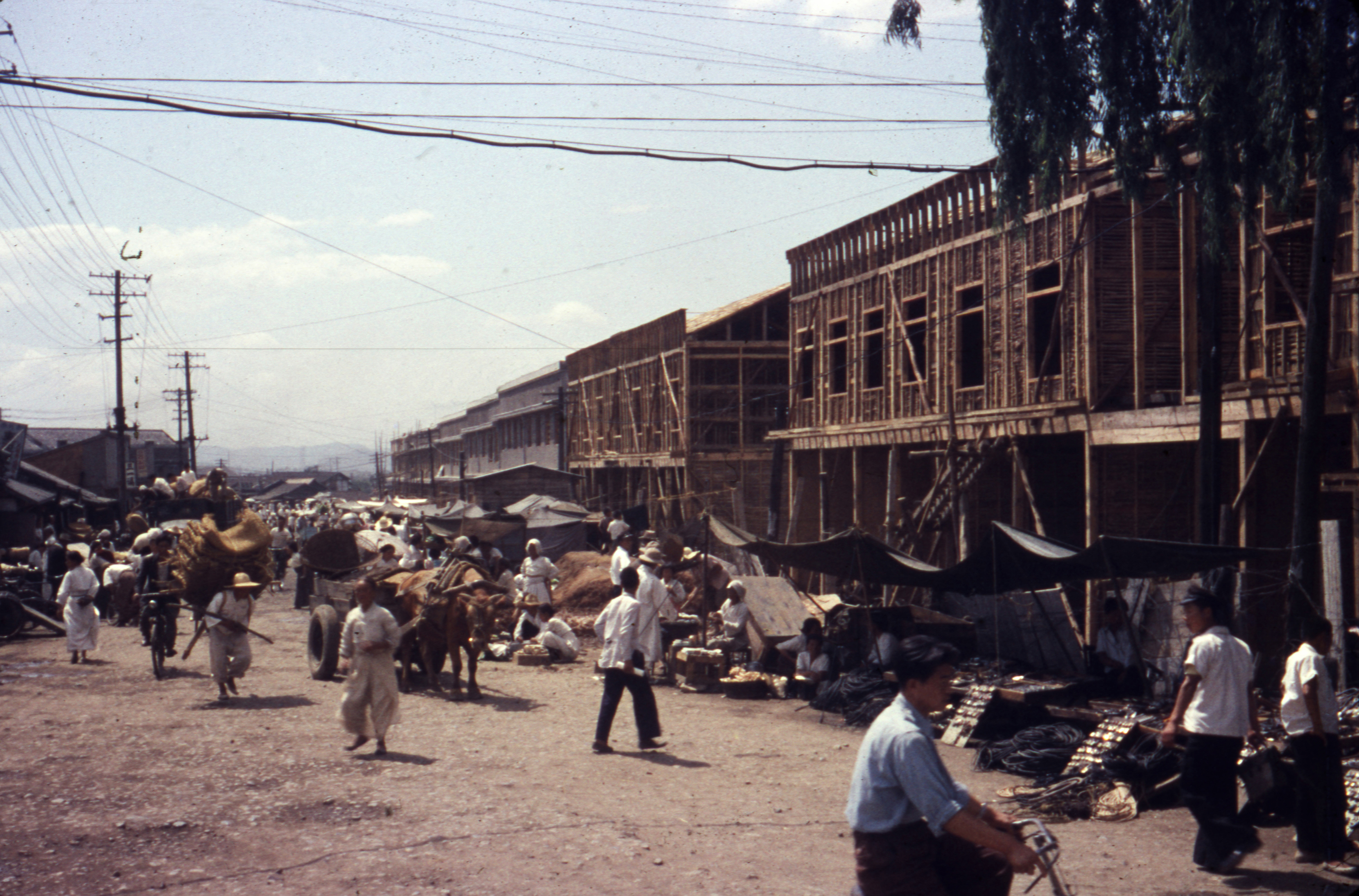
The market in 1957

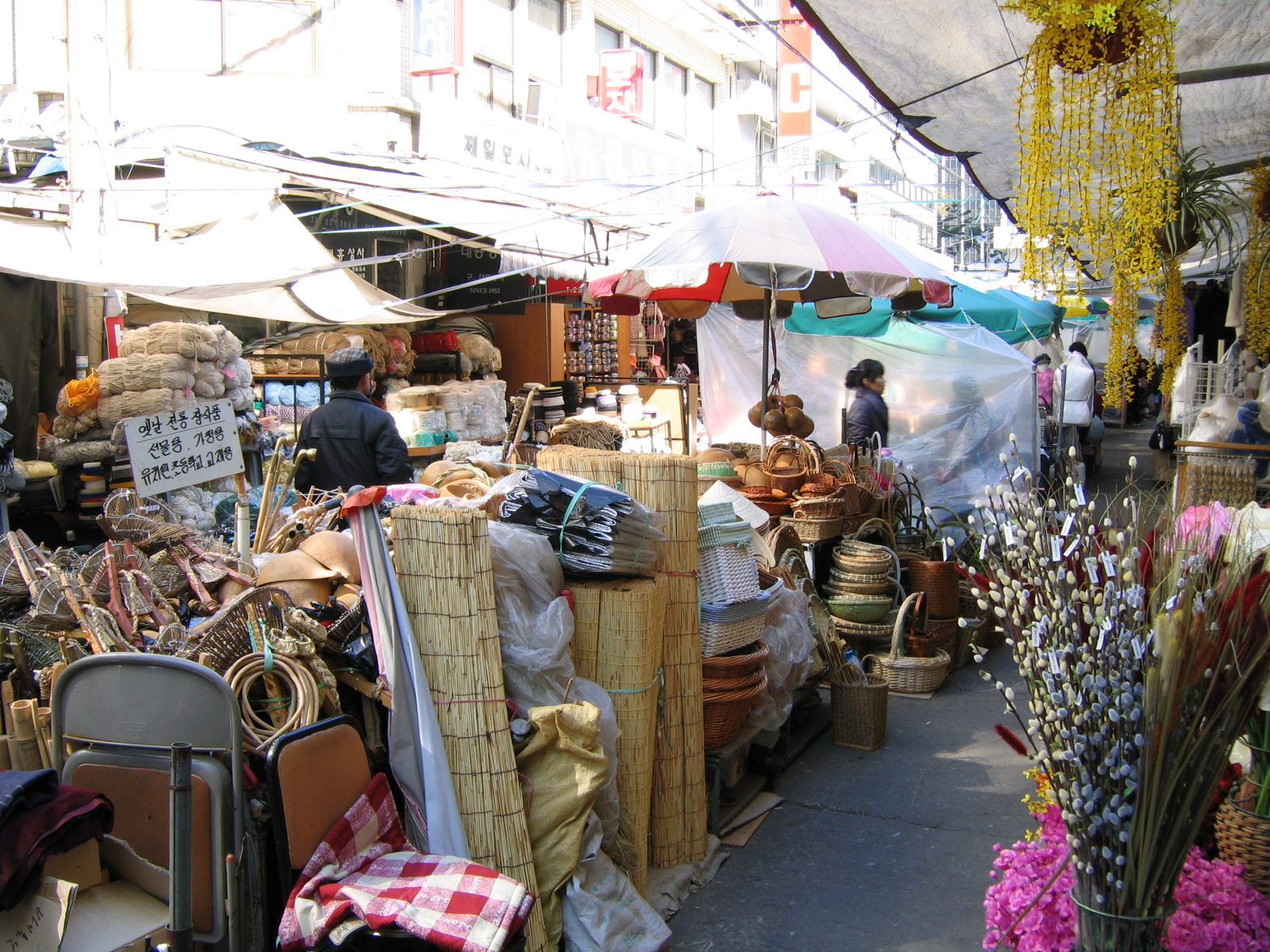
Stalls in the market (2005)

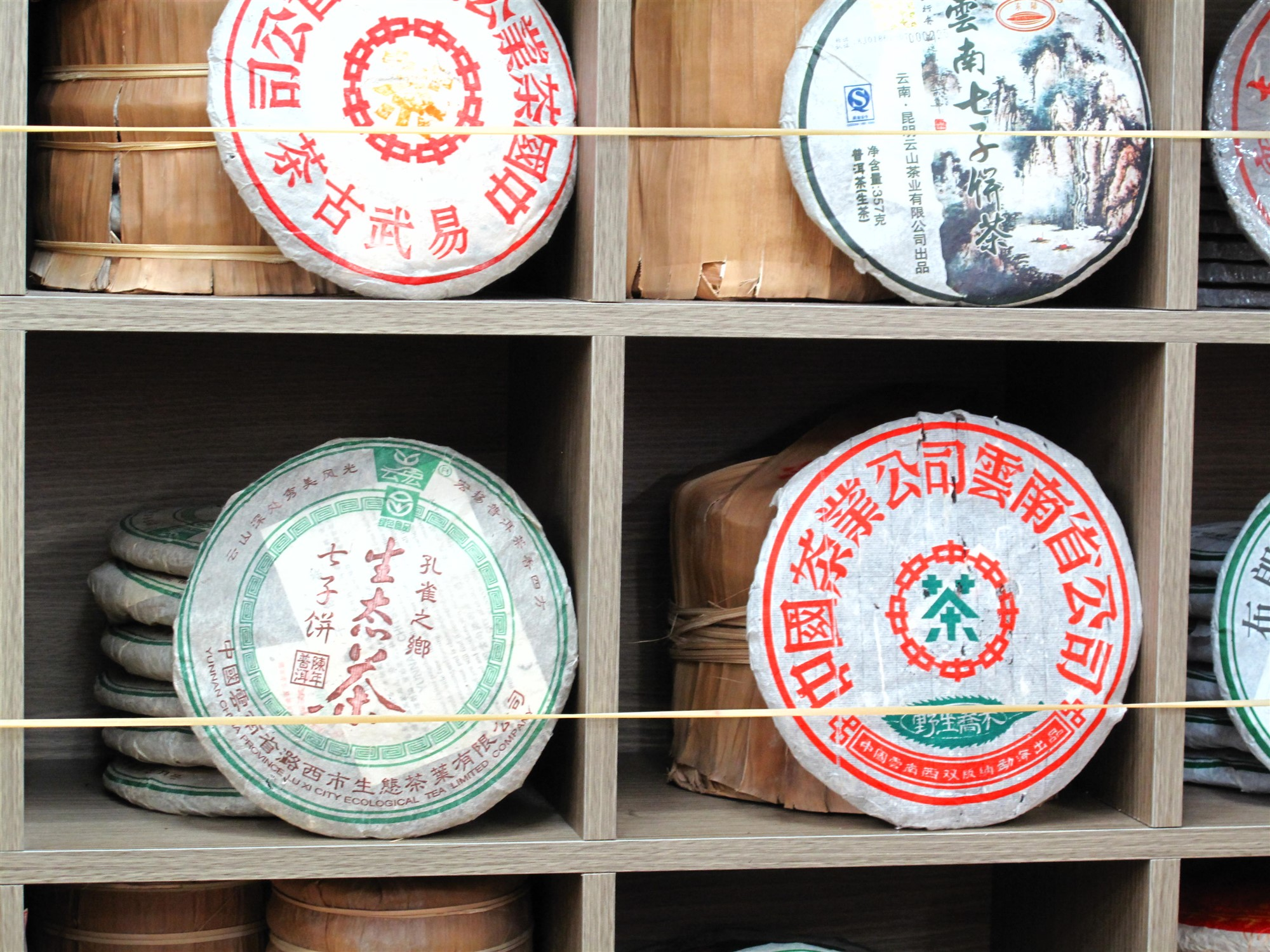
Tea sold in the market (2010)

== See also ==
- List of markets in South Korea
- List of South Korean tourist attractions
- Economy of South Korea
