= National Debt Repayment Movement =

1907–1908 campaign in the Korean Empire

- Part of Korean independence movement
- Date: February 1907 – 1908
- Location: Korean Empire
- Also known as: National Debt Redemption Movement
- Motive: Repay the Korean government's debts to protect Korean sovereignty
- Outcome: Raised 160,000 to 190,000 won (approximately 1.5% of total debt), funds eventually seized by Japanese

Korean name
- Hangul: 국채보상운동
- Hanja: 國債報償運動
- RR: Gukchae bosang undong
- MR: Kukch'ae posang undong

The National Debt Repayment Movement (Korean: 국채보상운동) was a 1907 to 1908 fundraising campaign in the Korean Empire, done as part of the Korean independence movement. The movement and its records were designated part of the UNESCO Memory of the World Programme in 2017.

At the time of the movement, Korea was heavily indebted to the Empire of Japan and rapidly losing its sovereignty. It would be fully annexed into the empire by 1910. The movement began as a grassroots movement by Korean citizens to repay government bonds. It gained widespread support throughout the country, with support across the social spectrum: from peasants to Emperor Gojong. However, it quickly lost momentum in 1908 due to the arrests of leaders in the movement Yang Gi-tak and Ernest Bethell. Most of the remaining funds were then seized by the Japanese government in 1910.

== Background ==
Since the 1894–1895 First Sino-Japanese War, Japan had been offering significant loans to the Korean government (first Joseon then its successor the Korean Empire). According to the Encyclopedia of Korean Culture, offering loans under difficult terms was used as a strategy to deprive Korea of its sovereignty, as well as to prepare construction of infrastructure that would benefit Japan. Millions of Korean won in loans were given a number of times between 1894 and 1910. The average citizen became concerned with the impact that this was having on the Korean economy and sovereignty.

== Movement ==
In Daegu in mid-February 1907, Kim Gwang-je and Sŏ Sang-tong of the company Kwangmunsa (광문사; 廣文社) proposed a fundraising movement to pay off the government debt. At that time, Kwangmunsa was a publishing company that was dedicated to spreading reform-minded Silhak writings to protect the nation's sovereignty. Sŏ was an active member of the Korean independence movement, and had previously been a part of the Independence Club and People's Joint Association.

The pair wrote the following: (Note: 『예전에 청국 및 러시아와 전쟁을 벌여 작은 나라로서 큰 나라를 이겼다. 이는 군대가 죽음을 무릅쓰고 유혈이 가득한 전쟁터에 기쁘게 뛰어들었을 뿐만 아니라, 집에 있는 백성들은 신발을 만들어 팔거나 소지품을 팔고, 아녀자들은 반지를 모아서 군자금에 보탰기 때문이다... 아, 우리 2,000만 동포가 이렇게 나라가 어려움에 처한 때를 만나 어느 한 사람 결심하지도 않고 아무런 계획도 세우지 않은 채 단지 우리 황상(皇上)이 지극히 근심하시는 것만 바라보면서 수수방관한 채 멸망으로 치닫고 있다면, 이것이 과연 합당한 일인가? ...지금이 바로 정신을 차리고 충성과 의리를 분발할 때가 아닌가? 지금 나라의 빚이 1,300만 원이며, 이는 우리 대한제국의 존망에 관계된 일이다. 이를 갚으면 나라를 보존하게 되고 못 갚으면 나라를 잃고 만다. ...땅을 한 번 잃으면 돌이킬 방법이 없을 뿐만 아니라 월남과 같은 나라의 민족 신세를 면하기 어렵다. ...아, 우리 2,000만 동포 중 진실로 조금이라도 애국 사상을 가진 사람이 있다면 두 마음을 품지 말아야 할 것이다. ...이를 통해 위로는 황상의 은혜에 보답하고 아래로는 강토를 지킬 수 있다면 천만다행이라 생각한다.』)

In the past, our tiny nation emerged victorous in wars with Qing and Russia. This was the result of not only our soldiers gladly risking their lives and jumping into bloodied battlefields, but also of the commoners at home who made and sold shoes [for military funds].

...Ah, is it really reasonable for us, in our country's darkest hour, to just stand and gawk at our extremely worried emperor and impending doom, meanwhile not a one of our twenty million citizens makes a plan to change things? ...Is now not the time to wake up and act on your loyalty and duty?

The national debt is now thirteen million won, and is tied to the survival of our Korean Empire... [I]f we fail to pay it, we lose the country. And if land is once lost, not only can it not be taken back, but it will also be difficult to difficult to escape the turmoil suffered by countries like Vietnam.

...Oh, if any of our 20 million compatriots has even the slightest sense of patriotism, they should not be of two minds... Through this, I think it would be a relief if we can repay our emperor for his lofty grace and protect the ground on which we stand.

— The Korea Daily News, February 21, 1907

The 13 million won would be worth, in 2022 value, 330 billion South Korean won or US$280,000,000. Also in the same article, they advocated for abstaining from smoking tobacco, a widespread habit at the time, in order to raise money.

=== Rapid spread ===
The movement gained national attention, with support from all social classes. It was covered in newspapers across the country, especially by the historic The Korea Daily News, run by Yang Gi-tak and Ernest Bethell. Emperor Gojong expressed his support for the movement (his often pro-Japanese ministers also participated, but passively). Merchants and the lower class similarly embraced the movement. According to one story of uncertain veracity, one day robbers accosted an official who they discovered was transporting funds for the movement. Instead of robbing the official, they went back to their hiding place and returned with their own money to donate to the official.

In Seoul, Kim Sŏng-hŭi (김성희; 金成喜) established the National Debt Repayment Association (국채보상기성회; 國債報償期成會) on February 22. They organized various collection points for the money. Around twenty other similar location organizations were established throughout the country.

The movement was most active from April to December 1907, with the most donations collected between June and August. The amount of money raised is uncertain. However, one estimate by South Korean historian Jeong Jin-seok (정진석) put the peak money raised at 160,000 to 190,000 won (in 2022 around ₩4 to 4.75 billion or around US$3 to 3.5 million). While this was a large amount of money at the time, it was only around 1.5% of the country's total debt.

=== Decline ===
The movement began to decline by 1908. It is not known with certainty why the movement declined, although most scholars believe it was because of Japanese pushback, in particular pushback to Yang and Bethell. The Japanese attempted to expel Bethell from the country beginning in 1907, and eventually arrested him in May 1908. In July, Yang was also arrested. The Japanese authorities claimed Bethell and Yang were embezzling the funds they had stored. Reportedly, the Japanese prosecutor at Yang's trial even confessed that he did not find the evidence against Yang to be convincing and hoped that Yang would be found innocent. Yang was eventually found innocent and released from prison due to a lack of evidence.

Jeong Jin-seok claims that Bethell had actually mismanaged some of the funds given to him. Bethell invested part of the funds into shares of the American mining firm Collbran-Bostwick Development Company, and lent money to a French hotellier in Seoul named Martin. Because of this, public enthusiasm somewhat soured on the movement. While some grassroots fundraising still continued for a time, it eventually halted.

=== Fate of the funds raised ===
What happened to the funds raised is not widely known. One journalist writing for The Chosun Ilbo in 2022 noted that popular encyclopedias like the Encyclopedia of Korean Culture, Namuwiki, and the Korean Wikipedia all lacked information on the fate of the money.

Historian Jeong Jin-seok wrote on this matter. After Yang's release from prison, he reportedly proposed holding onto the funds until the moment was right for their reinvestment. Bethell died in May 1909 of an illness, and his newspaper was sold to the Japanese. The National Debt Repayment Association had their own discussions on what to do with the money, including building schools or a bank, but their plans did not come to fruition, and they eventually were forced to shut down in August 1910.

A December 15, 1910 article in Maeil sinbo wrote the following of what happened to the money afterwards: (Note: 『(강제 합병) 3개월 후인 1910년 12월 12일 총독부 경무총감부는 기금을 모두 압수했다. 총독부가 빼앗은 금액은 ‘국채보상금처리회’의 교육기본금관리회가 관리 중이던 9만여원과 ‘국채보상지원금총합소’의 4만2000원이었다. ‘국민의 핏방울’이요, 애국심이 결집된 ‘고혈(膏血)’이었던 성금은 허무하게도 일제의 손에 넘어가고 말았다.』)

Three months after [the forced annexation of Korea], on December 12, 1910, the chief of police of the Governor-General of Chōsen confiscated all the funds. The amount stolen by the Governor-General was about 90,000 from the National Debt Fund Management Association (국채보상금처리회), and 42,000 from the National Debt Subsidy Holding Association (국채 보상 지원금 총합소; 國債報償支援金總合所. Note: Yang's organization). ...The blood, sweat, and tears (고혈; 膏血) that these donations embodied were all for naught, as they fell into the hands of the Japanese.

However, the total described here only covers 132,000 won, when the estimated total raised was around 160,000 to 190,000. In an interview, Jeong said that he did not know what happened to the remaining money.

== Legacy ==
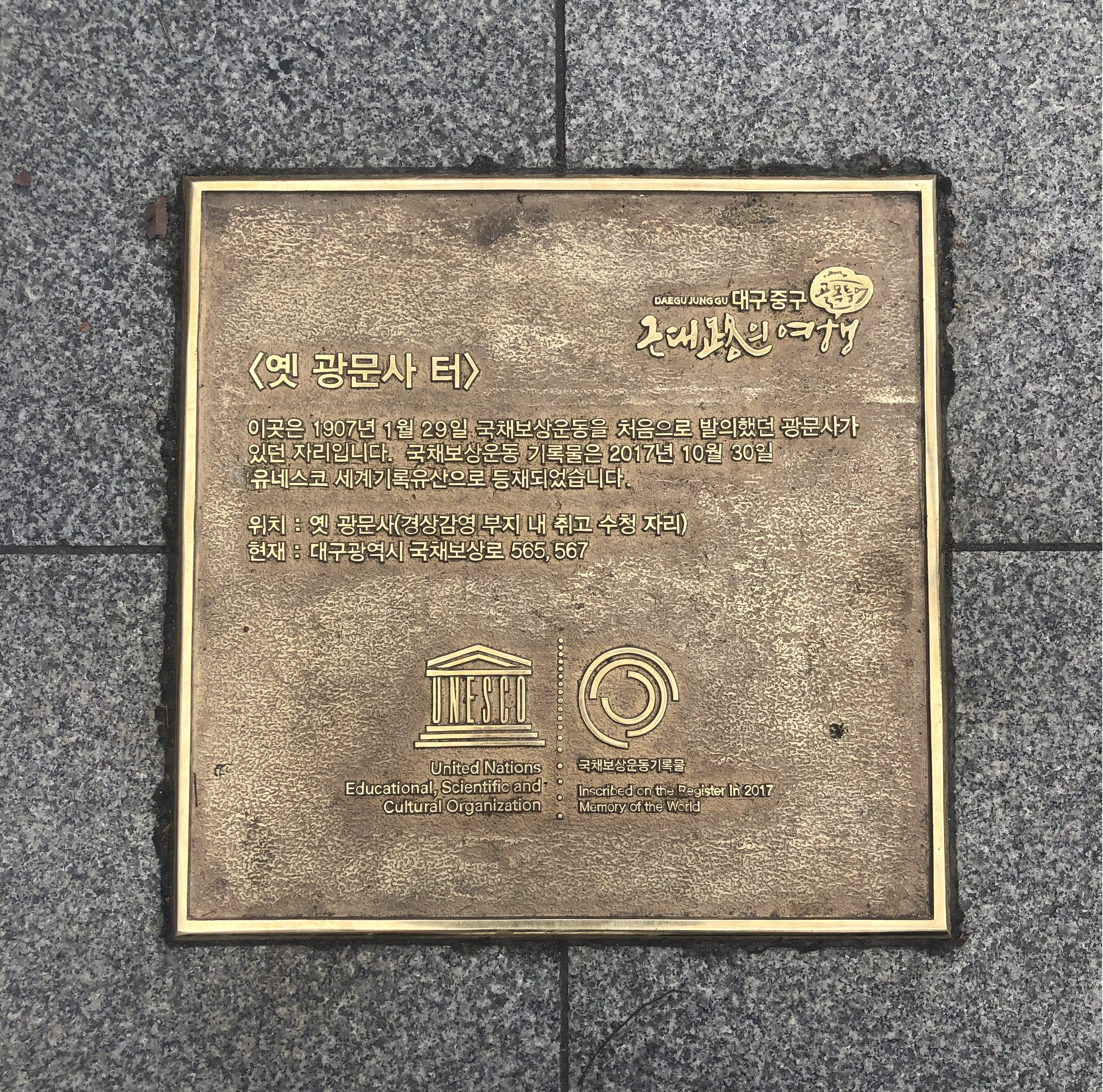
A plaque marking the original location of Kwangmunsa, where the movement started (2020)

The National Debt Redemption Movement Memorial Park was established in Daegu in 1999. The National Debt Redemption Movement Memorial Museum opened in the park in 2011. The museum contains historical documents related to the movement and provides exhibits on its significance and impact.

== See also ==
- History of Korea
- Gold-collecting campaign – a 1998 campaign inspired by this movement
