= Cheongnyeongpo =

Scenic site of South Korea

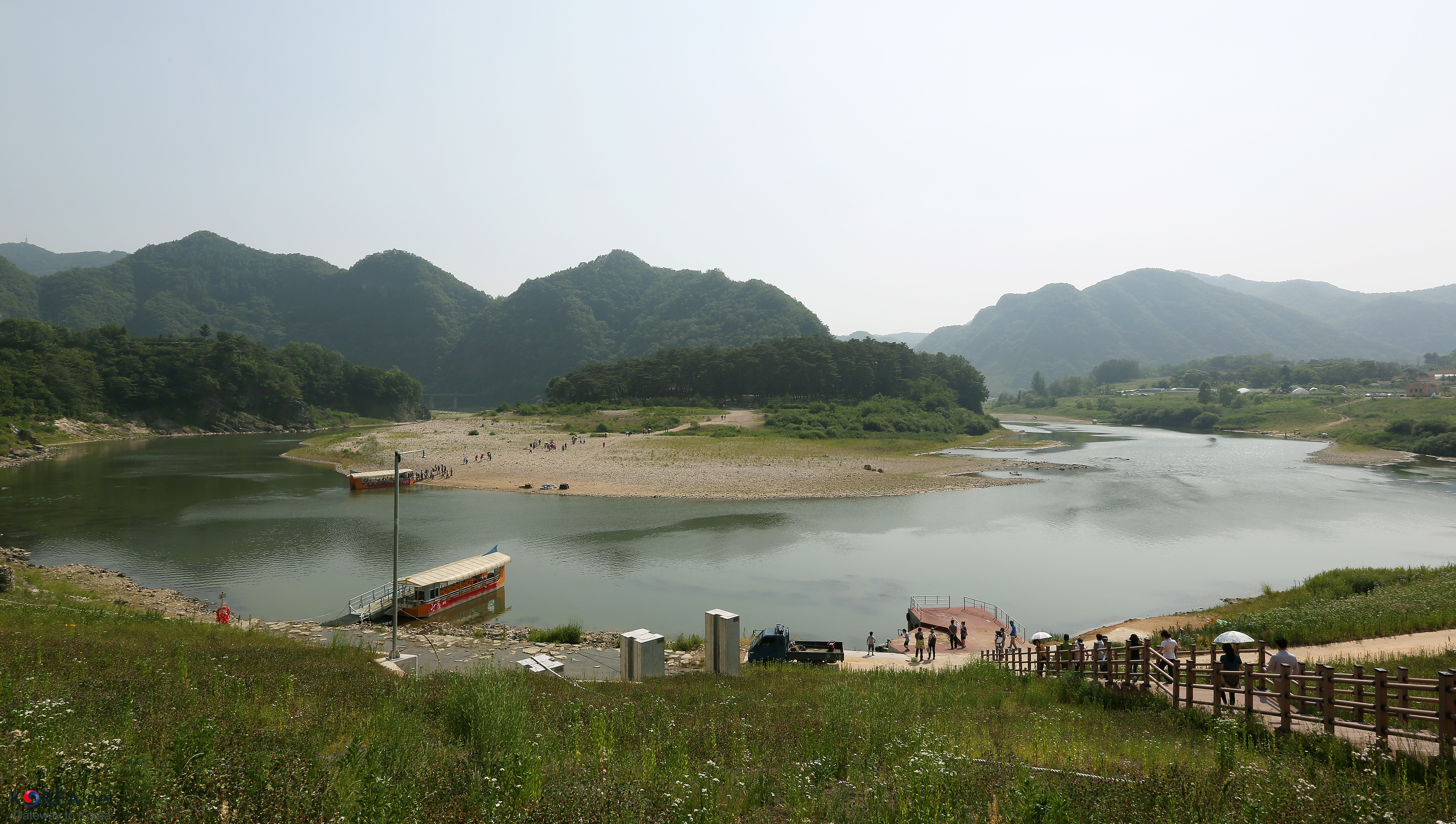
- Cheongnyeongpo in 2014
- Interactive map of Cheongnyeongpo
- 37°10′30.1″N 128°26′38.6″E
- Location: Yeongwol County, Gangwon Province, South Korea

Scenic Sites of South Korea
- Official name: Cheongnyeongpo Meandering Stream, Yeongwol
- Designated: 2008-12-26

Korean name
- Hangul: 청령포
- Hanja: 淸泠浦
- RR: Cheongnyeongpo
- MR: Ch'ŏngnyŏngp'o

Cheongnyeongpo (Korean: 청령포) is a meander in Yeongwol County, Gangwon Province, South Korea. It is where King Danjong was banished to in 1457 after he was forced to abdicate the throne to his uncle King Sejo. It was designated as Scenic Site in 2008.

== History ==
King Danjong stayed in Cheongnyeongpo for two months. After a flood broke out, he moved to Gwanpungheon. Here he wrote Jagyusi, a poem comparing himself to an oriental scops owl which cries mournfully. Eom Heung-do, hojang of Yeongwol, is said to have secretly visited Cheongnyeongpo to comfort King Danjong after hearing him cry.

King Yeongjo erected a no trespassing stele (금표비) in 1726 to prevent the public from entering the site. In 1763, he built a monument and a monument house (비각) on the site of eoso (King Danjong's residence).

In 2000, the giwajip (tiled house) King Danjong lived in was restored and a chogajip was built as an attached building.

== Facilities ==
Visitors can only go in and out of Cheongnyeongpo by boat.

- Manghyangtap is a tower King Danjong built when he missed his wife Queen Jeongsun.
- Gwaneumsong (관음송; 觀音松) is a pine tree thought to be 600 years old. King Danjong is said to have sat on the trunk of the tree. It is designated as a Natural Monument. The nearby pine tree forest won a prize in the 2004 Beautiful Forest Contest held by Korea Forest Service.
- "Eom Heung-do Pine Tree" in front of the eoso grows horizontally.

== In media ==
Cheongnyeongpo is the background of the film The King's Warden.

== Gallery ==
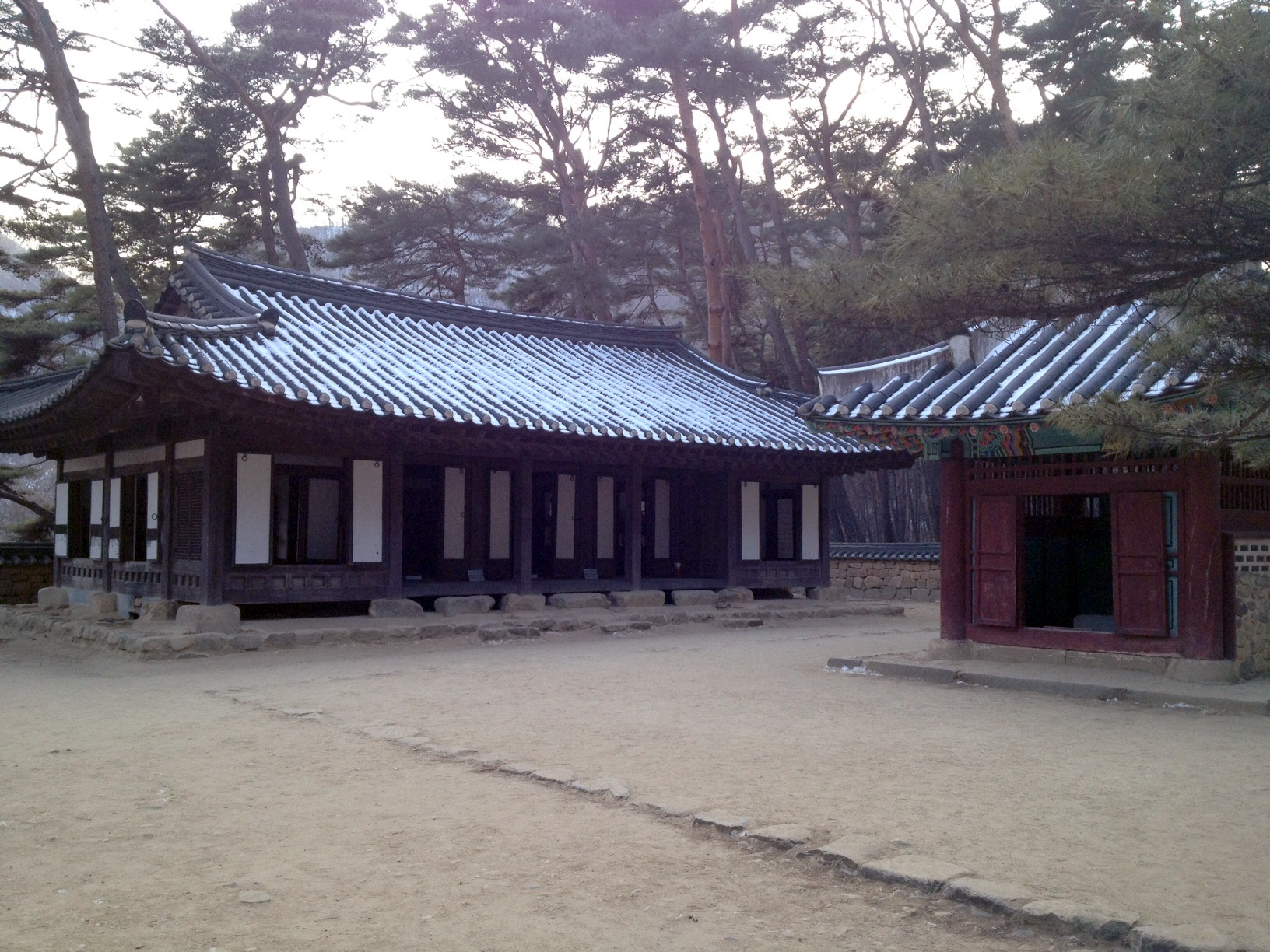
Eoso

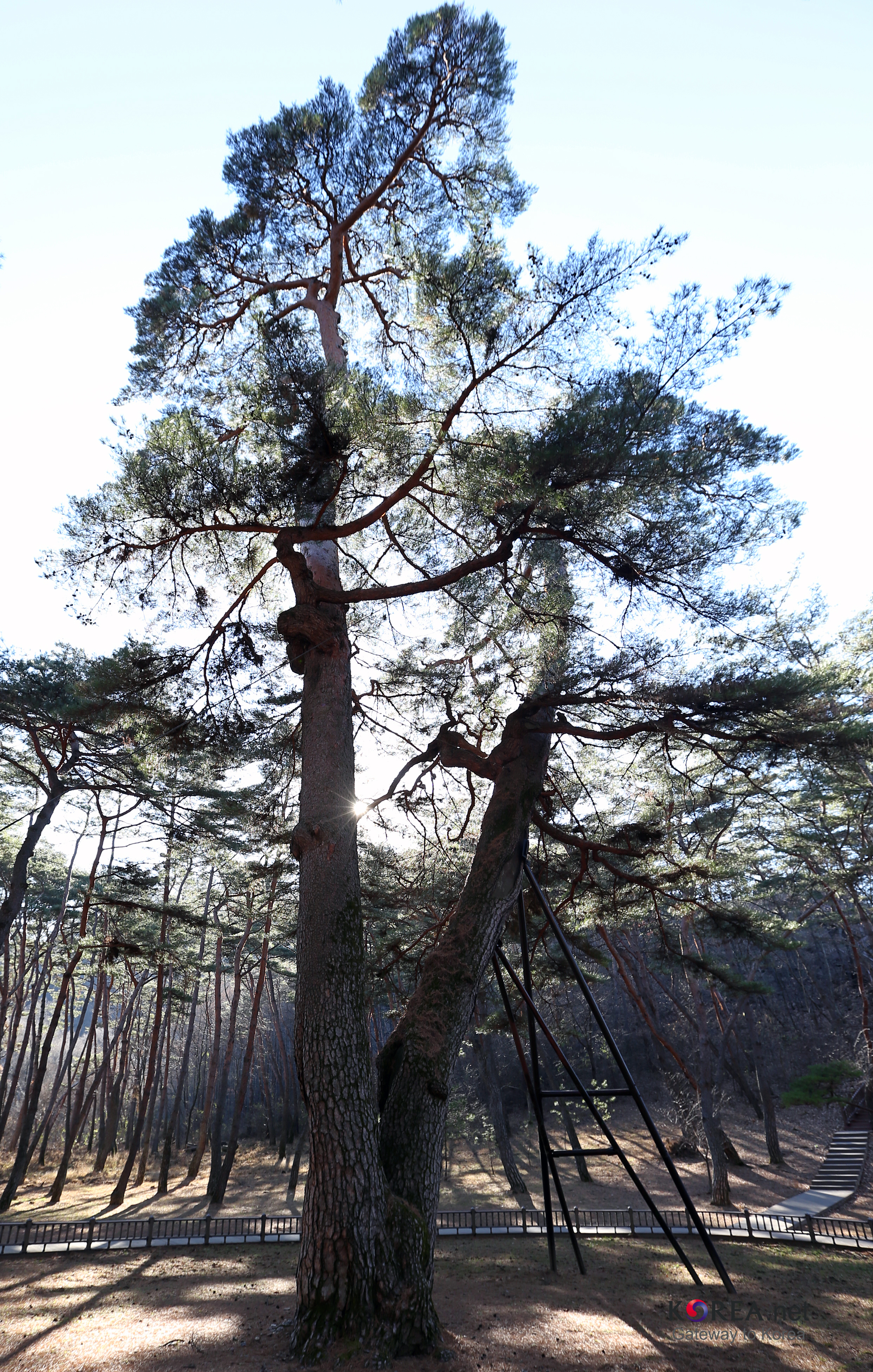
Gwaneumsong

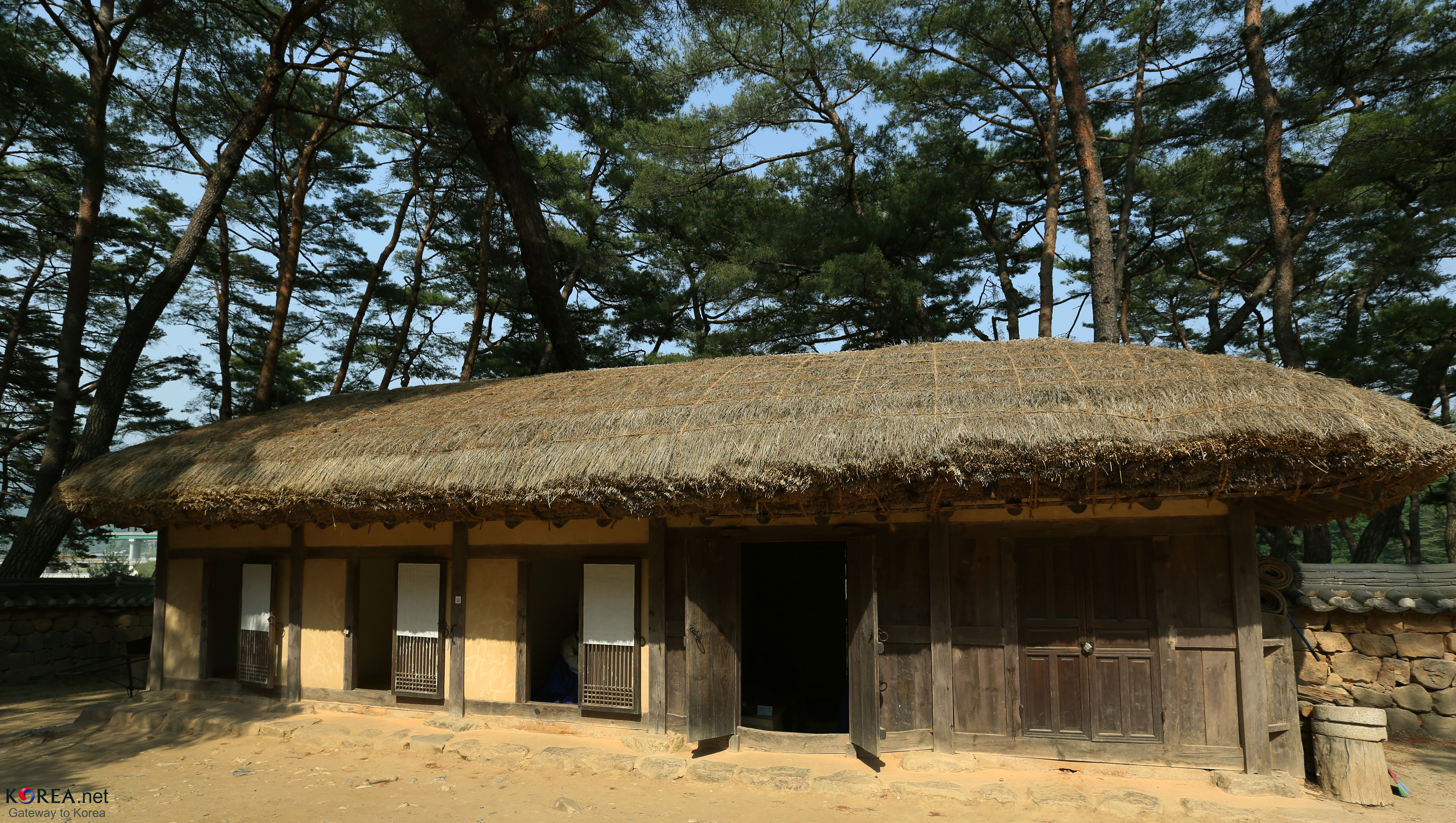
Chogajip
