= Stele of Lord Eom =

Monument in Ulsan, South Korea

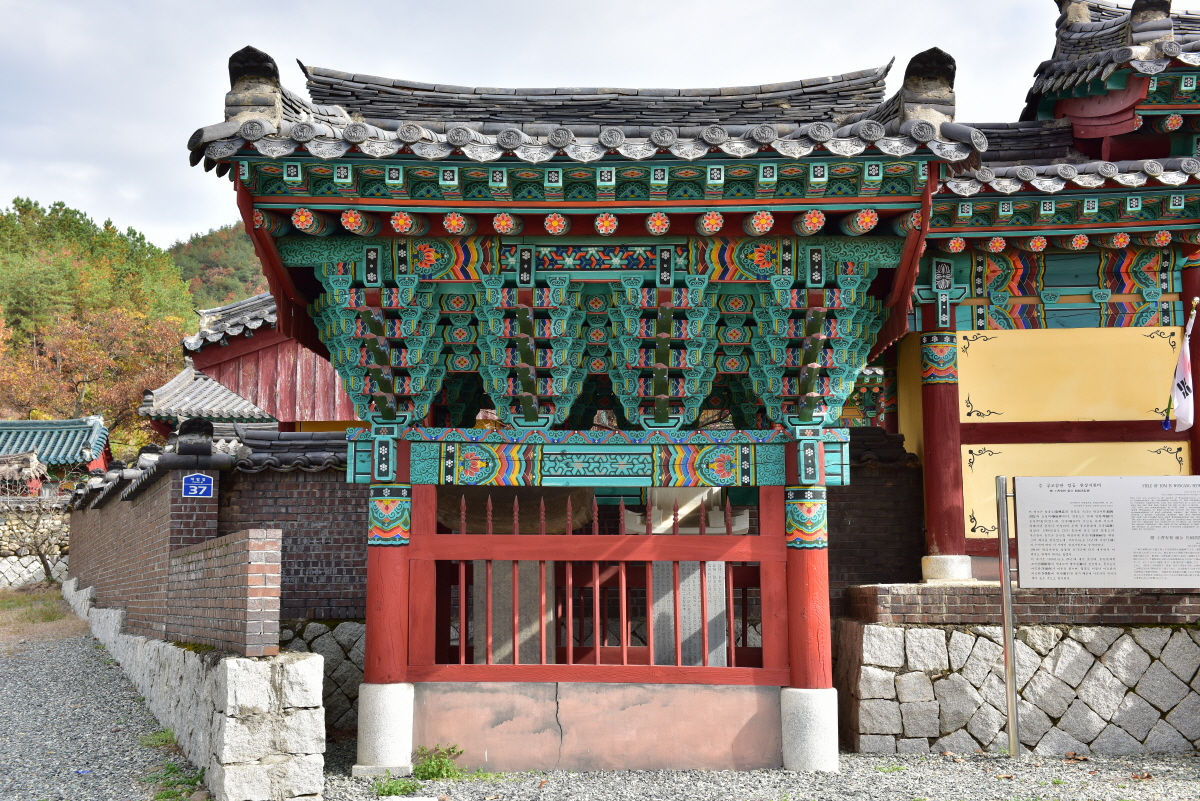
- The protective pavilion housing the Stele of Lord Eom at Wongang Seowon (2015)
- Type: Cultural Heritage of Ulsan
- Designation: Ulsan Tangible Cultural Heritage Material No. 10
- Location: 37 Daebat-gil (Dungi-ri), Samdong-myeon, Ulju County, Ulsan, South Korea; 35°31′22.9″N 129°10′56.6″E

The Stele of Lord Eom (Korean: 엄공비; Hanja: 嚴公碑)is a historical stone monument located in Samdong-myeon, Ulju County, Ulsan. On October 19, 1998, it was designated as Tangible Cultural Heritage Material No. 10 of Ulsan Metropolitan City. It was originally erected in October 1820 (the 20th year of King Sunjo's reign) to honor the unwavering loyalty of Eom Heung-do, a local official who risked his life to secretly recover and bury the body of the deposed King Danjong in 1457. Initially situated at the historic Wongang Seowon (Confucian Academy), both the academy and the stele were relocated to their present location in 1994 to accommodate the construction of the Onsan Industrial Complex.

== History and description ==
The following is derived from the official on-site informational plaque provided by the Cultural Heritage Administration:

A stele standing within Wongang Seowon, commemorating the loyalty of Eom Heung-do, a scholar during the reigns of King Danjong and King Sejo of the Joseon dynasty.

Eom Heung-do served as the hojang (local headman) of Yeongwol when the young King Danjong was exiled there by King Sejo. When Danjong was murdered, Eom retrieved his body and secretly buried him at the site of what is now the Jangneung royal tomb. Fearing retaliation from King Sejo, he then vanished into hiding. Later, King Sukjong revered his loyalty and posthumously appointed him as Gongjo Chamui (Third Minister of Public Works). King Yeongjo granted a jeongyeomun (red gate of honor) for him and eventually elevated his posthumous title to Gongjo Panseo (Minister of Public Works). In 1799 (the 23rd year of King Jeongjo), his descendants in Ulsan built Wongangsa Shrine to perform ancestral rites for him. Following public consensus, the shrine was upgraded to Wongang Seowon (Confucian Academy) in 1817 (the 17th year of King Sunjo), and this stele was erected shortly after.

The stele, housed inside a protective pavilion, consists of a main body stone set upon a square pedestal and topped with a capstone. Erected in 1820 (the 20th year of King Sunjo), the stele's inscription was composed by Jo Jin-gwan, an official of the Hongmungwan (Office of Special Advisors), and calligraphed by the Royal Secretary (Dongbuseungji), Yi Ik-hoe. The title of the stele engraved on the front was written by Yi Jo-won, the Minister of Personnel, who was renowned as a master calligrapher, endowing the monument with significant art-historical value.

In 1994, Wongang Seowon was relocated to its current site and newly rebuilt, at which time the stele was also moved and erected alongside it.

== Gallery ==
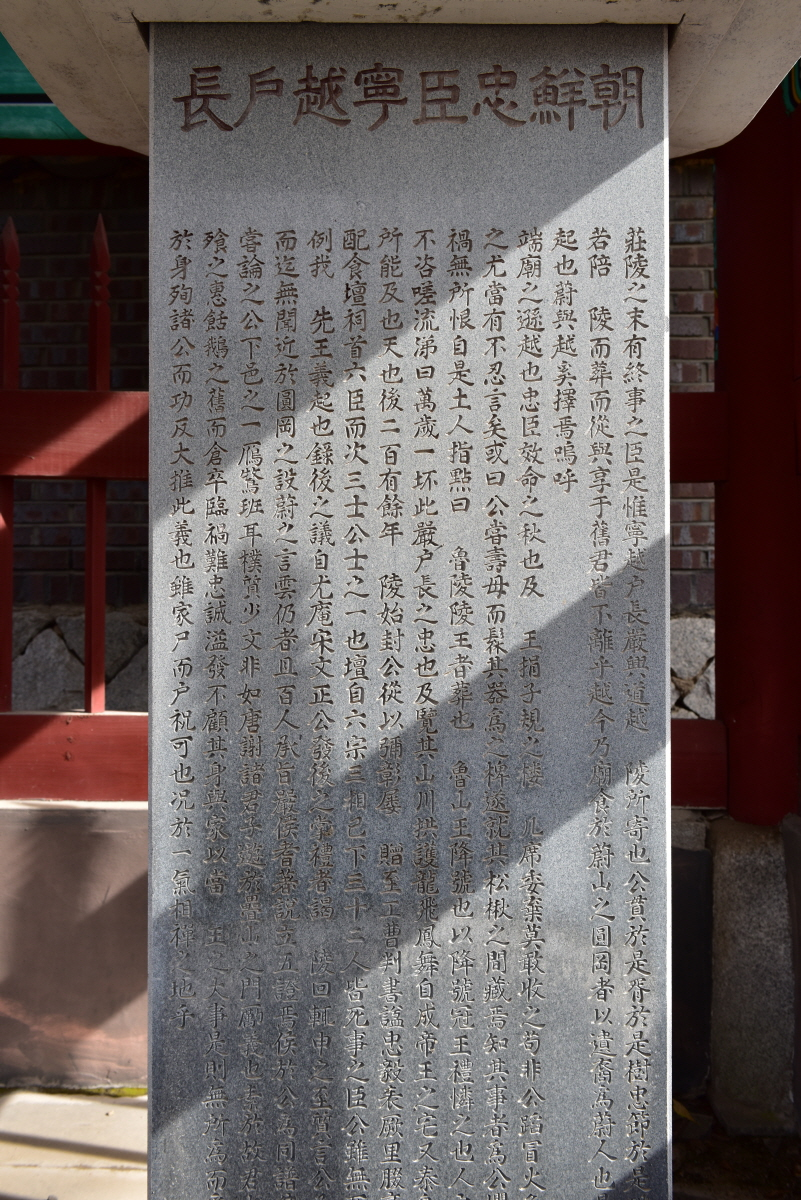
Inscription detail 1

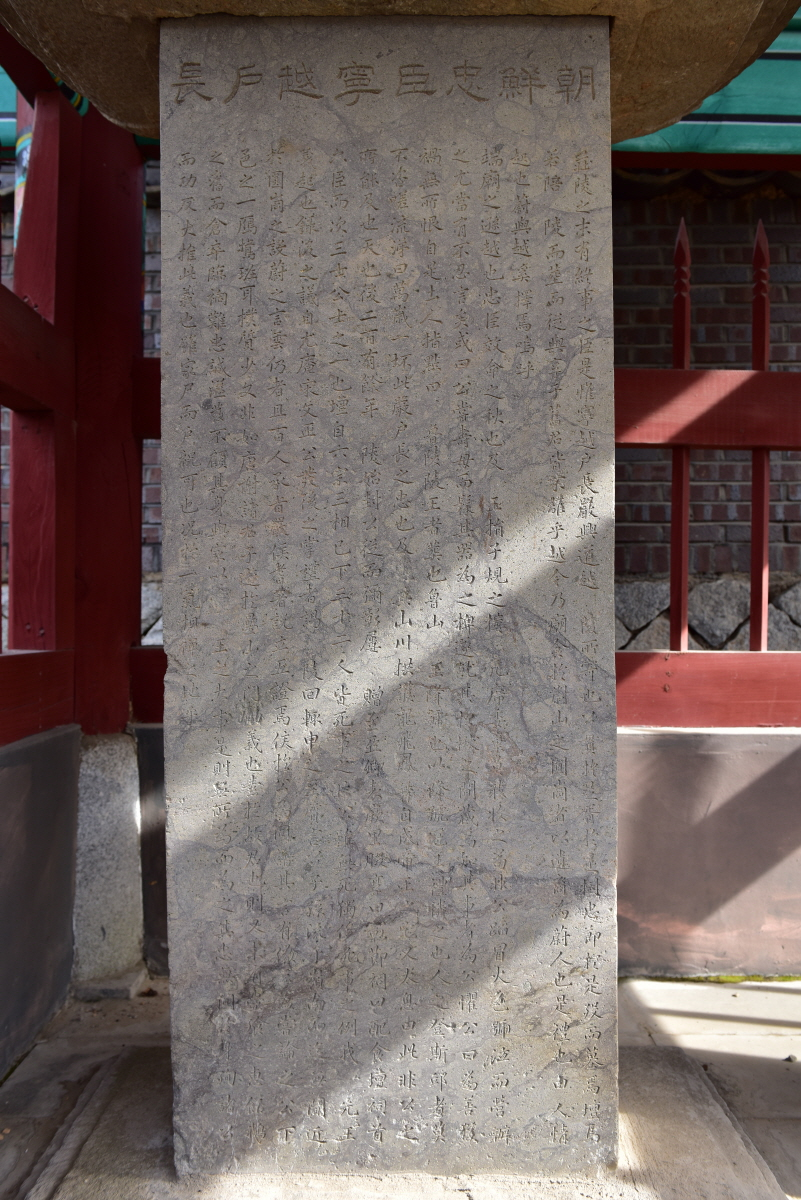
Inscription detail 2

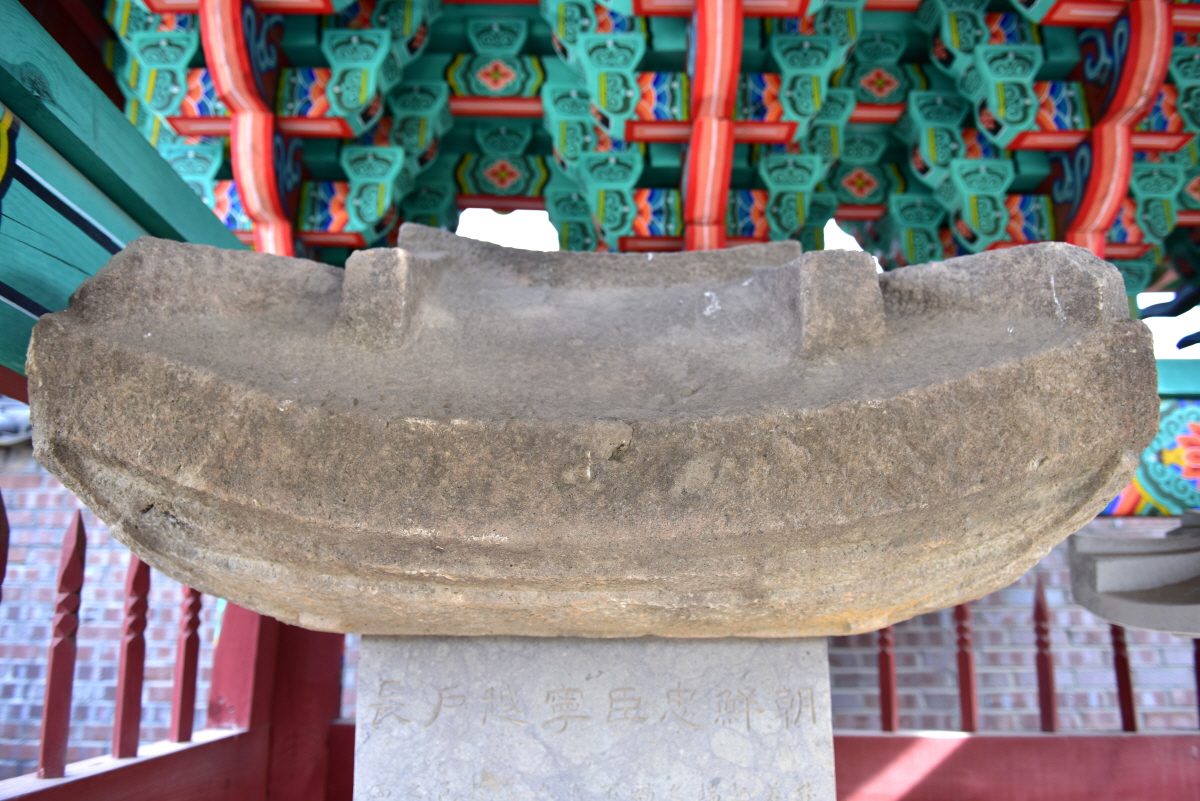
Capstone (Isu)

== See also ==
- Eom Heung-do
- Danjong of Joseon
