= Sugui Kim =

Sugui Kim (숙의 김씨) may refer to:

- Sugui Kim (Danjong) (1440–1525), a consort of Danjong of Joseon
- Sugui Kim (Seongjong) (fl. 15th century), a consort of Seongjong of Joseon
- Sugui Kim (Jungjong) (died 1562), a consort of Jungjong of Joseon
- Sugui Kim (Hyojong) (fl. 17th century), a consort of Hyojong of Joseon
- Sugui Kim (Heonjong) (1814–1895), a consort of Heonjong of Joseon
- Sugui Kim (Cheoljong) (born 1833), a consort of Cheoljong of Joseon
