= The King's Warden =

2026 film by Jang Hang-jun

- Theatrical release poster
- Hangul: 왕과 사는 남자
- Hanja: 王과 사는 男子
- Lit.: The Man Who Lives with the King
- RR: Wanggwa saneun namja
- MR: Wanggwa sanŭn namja
- Directed by: Jang Hang-jun
- Written by: Jang Hang-jun; Hwang Seong-gu
- Produced by: Im Eun-jeong; Jang Won-seok
- Starring: Yoo Hae-jin; Park Ji-hoon; Yoo Ji-tae; Jeon Mi-do; Kim Min; Park Ji-hwan; Lee Joon-hyuk; Ahn Jae-hong
- Cinematography: Choi Young-hwan
- Edited by: Heo Seon-mi
- Music by: Dalpalan
- Production companies: Onda Works; B.A. Entertainment
- Distributed by: Showbox
- Release date: February 4, 2026
- Country: South Korea
- Language: Korean
- Budget: $6.9 million
- Box office: $123 million

The King's Warden (Korean: 왕과 사는 남자) is a 2026 South Korean historical drama film directed and written by Jang Hang-jun with Hwang Seong-gu as co-writer. It features an ensemble cast led by Yoo Hae-jin, Park Ji-hoon, Yoo Ji-tae, and Jeon Mi-do. The film explores the domestic life and psychological isolation of the deposed King Danjong during his exile in 1457. Distributed by Showbox, it was released on February 4, 2026.

On March 6, 2026, The King's Warden reached 10 million admissions, becoming the 34th film in South Korea to do so. By July 2026, the film recorded 16.91 million admissions, making it the second most-watched and highest-grossing film in South Korean box office history. At the 62nd Baeksang Arts Awards, it won three awards: the Grand Prize, Best New Actor, and Gucci Impact Award.

== Plot ==
Yi Hong-wi, the teenage king of Joseon, is overthrown by his uncle, Grand Prince Suyang, and demoted to Prince Nosan. The powerful official Han Myŏnghoe sends the former king into exile in the hopes that he would commit suicide. Eom Heung-do is the chief of a poor village in the mountain valley of Cheongnyeongpo in Yeongwol. After visiting a neighboring village, which became prosperous after sheltering an exiled (later reinstated) aristocrat, he convinces his villagers to do the same after hearing the news of an exiled nobleman coming to the region.

Heung-do's village is chosen as the place of exile for Prince Nosan due to its remote location. Nosan arrives with his loyal maid Mae-hwa. The villagers become anxious when they learn the true identity of Nosan, who is haunted by the memory of his loyal court officials who were brutally executed for opposing the new king. He grows suicidal and attempts to jump off a cliff, but is saved at the last second by Heung-do. Grand Prince Kŭmsŏng, another uncle of Nosan, secretly contacts him about an upcoming revolt to restore him to the throne.

Heung-do oversteps and angrily chastises Nosan after mistaking him to be attempting another suicide. The commotion lures in a tiger which threatens them and the villagers. Tae-san, Heung-do's son, shoots the tiger with his hunting bow. Nosan draws the attention of the tiger and shoots it in the head, killing it. The incident brings new life to Nosan after he contemplates the perspective of Heung-do and his villagers. He begins to bond with them, and starts teaching Tae-san to prepare him for the Civil Service Exam.

Myŏnghoe becomes aware of the plot to restore Nosan to throne. When Tae-san visits Nosan's residence without permission, Myŏnghoe has him punished by flogging. Heung-do and Nosan try to intervene, but Myŏnghoe mocks Nosan's status as an exile and his lack of authority.

On the night of the revolt, Nosan escapes from his residence to join forces with Kŭmsŏng. Heung-do attempts to convince Nosan against leaving, but Nosan appeals to his newfound desire to take control of his destiny. Heung-do escorts him to the rendezvous location, where they and Kŭmsŏng's forces are ambushed and captured by Myŏnghoe's troops. Nosan pretends to accuse Heung-do of betrayal to save him and his village from destruction. The plot fails after Kŭmsŏng and his followers are captured.

Nosan and Kŭmsŏng are sentenced to death by royal decree via poisoned drink. Wishing to die on his own terms, Nosan convinces Heung-do to kill him instead. On the day of the execution, Heung-do mournfully strangles Nosan with a bowstring. Nosan's body is unceremoniously thrown into a river, and Mae-hwa jumps to her death. Heung-do secretly recovers Nosan's body from the river and gives him a burial.

The notes at the end of the movie state that 241 years after Yi Hong-wi's death, he is posthumously reinstated as King Danjong. Heung-do is celebrated for his loyalty and righteousness and their respective tombs still lie in the same place today. (Note: Although the movie says that Eom's tomb is in Yeongwol, Kim et al (2009) asserted that his real tomb is in Daegu.)

== Cast ==
- Yoo Hae-jin as Eom Heung-do
- Park Ji-hoon as Prince Nosan/King Danjong of Joseon (Yi Hong-wi)
- Yoo Ji-tae as Han Myŏnghoe
- Jeon Mi-do as Mae-hwa
- Kim Min as Eom Tae-san
- Park Ji-hwan as Eo Se-gyeom
- Lee Joon-hyuk as Grand Prince Geumseong (Yi Yu)
- Ahn Jae-hong as Norugol village chief

== Production ==
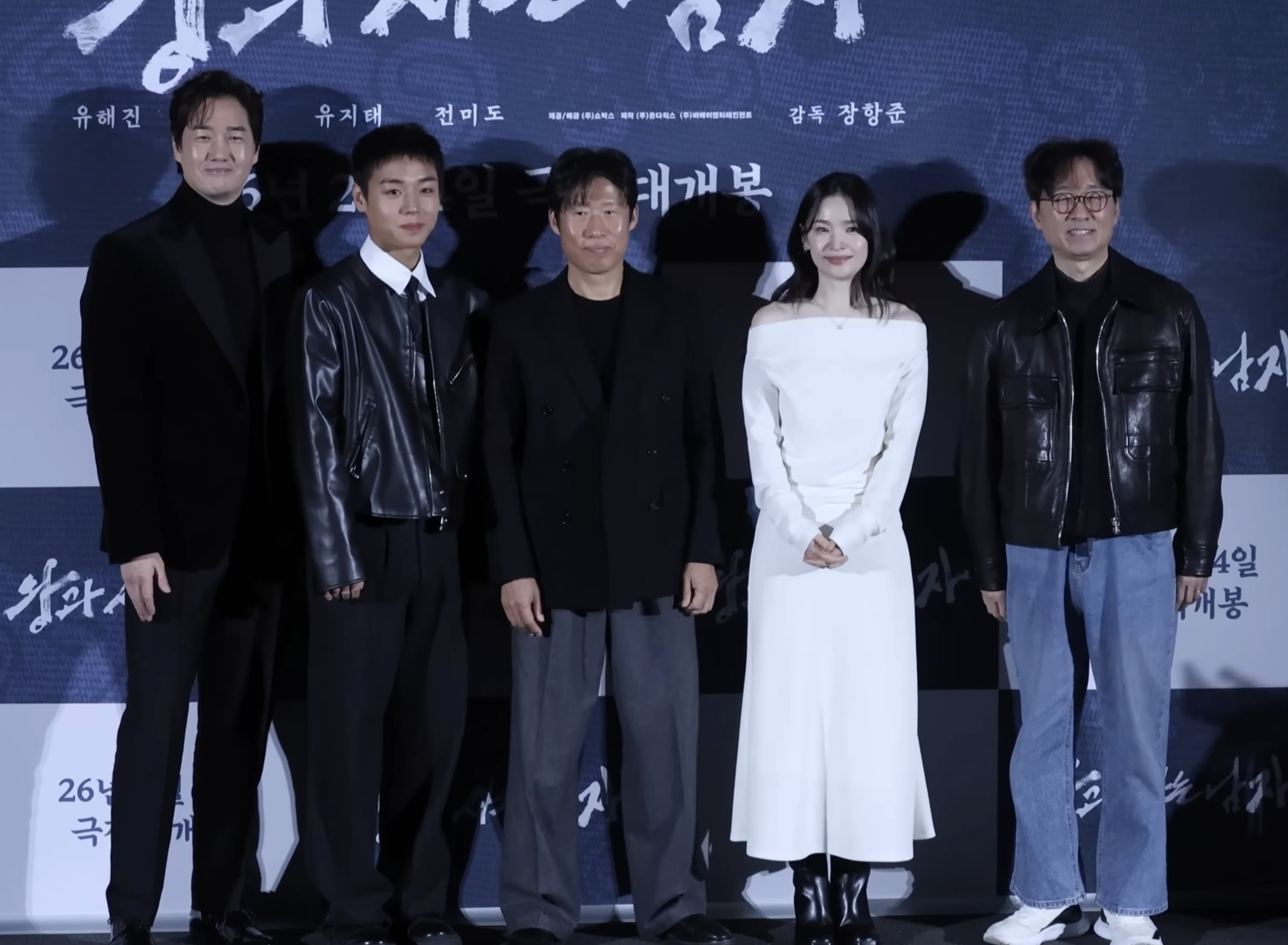
Yoo Ji-tae, Park Ji-hoon, Yoo Hae-jin, Jeon Mi-do, and Jang Hang-jun at the film's production press conference in December 2025

=== Development ===
According to film industry sources in July 2024, director Jang Hang-jun confirmed that his next project would be titled The King's Warden. The film focuses on the exile of King Danjong, the sixth King of Joseon, in Yeongwol, Gangwon Province. This is Jang's first time directing a historical drama (sageuk), despite his long career in other genres. Produced by Onda Works and B.A. Entertainment, and distributed by Showbox. Jang stated in a production briefing that he initially hesitated to take on a historical drama during a tough period for the film industry, he was ultimately drawn to the novelty of Danjong's story and encouraged by the positive "intuition" of his wife, writer Kim Eun-hee.

=== Casting ===
As of July 2024, Yoo Hae-jin, Yoo Ji-tae, and Lee Joon-hyuk were set to star for director Jang Hang-jun's film. While both Yoo were in the final stages of discussions, Lee decided to confirm his casting early reuniting him with the production company of The Roundup film series. This marks a lead role for Yoo Hae-jin while for Yoo Ji-tae, this is his first film in five years and first historical film in 17 years since Hwang Jin Yi (2007). For Lee, this is his first historical film role. Park Ji-hoon has been cast as King Danjong, the central historical figure of the film. Industry insiders noted that Park was selected for his ability to portray deep emotional vulnerability, a trait previously seen in his role in Weak Hero Class 1. Showbox confirmed that Jeon Mi-do joined the principal cast, following her roles in the medical series Hospital Playlist (2020–2021) and the 2024 thriller Connection. This also marks her first historical role. Park Ji-hwan was cast for a cameo appearance along with Lee Joon-hyuk who was previously announced for a lead role. The film's ensemble cast—Yoo Hae-jin, Park Ji-hoon, Yoo Ji-tae, Jeon Mi-do, Kim Min, as well as Lee Joon-hyuk and Park Ji-hwan—was officially announced in October 2024. Ahn Jae-hong has joined the cast and marks his second collaboration with director Jang following their work on the 2023 sports film Rebound.

=== Filming ===
Pre-production ended in late 2024, with principal photography began in the first half of 2025. Although the background of the movie is Cheongnyeongpo, it was filmed in other places such as Seondol and Mungyeong Saejae movie set because the original appearance of Cheongnyeongpo was not preserved.

== Release ==
The film was released on February 4, 2026, during the Korean New Year holiday. Industry analysts have identified the project as a key release for the domestic box office following a period of high market share for foreign films. It was also released in the United States, Canada, Australia, Taiwan, and New Zealand, and featured in the Far East Film Festival.

The film had special screening in the Korean Horizons section of the 25th New York Asian Film Festival on 23 July 2026 as part of the 25th anniversary of the festival.

== Reception ==
=== Box office ===
According to data from KOBIS, the tracking service operated by the Korean Film Council, The King's Warden earned $4.9 million from 761,832 admissions in its opening weekend with a 58.1% of the total revenue share. Five days after the release, the film reached a cumulative total of $6.4 million from over 1 million admissions. The film had the biggest daily attendance since March 2020 on February 16, 2026, drawing 537,190 spectators in a single day. On March 6, it recorded 10 million admissions in South Korea, making it the 34th movie (25th Korean movie) to do so. As of July 23, the film has a cumulative total of 16.91 million admissions, making it the second most watched and highest grossing film in South Korea.

=== Critical response ===
The movie scored an average of 6.57 out of 10 on Cine21. Reviewing for The Korea Times, Baek Byung-yeul wrote that the film is "brought to life by the brilliant acting of the lead stars". He stated that the "story is straightforward and unfolds in a linear fashion, making it easy to watch, but at times a bit rushed". However, it "succeeds as a human-centered drama as it focuses on the warmth of human connection and the courage of ordinary people". Similarly, Yang Gyeong-mi praised the cast but pointed out the poor structural completeness of the script.

=== Accolades ===
Award ceremony	Year	Category	Recipient(s)	Result	Ref.
Baeksang Arts Awards	2026	Grand Prize – Film	Yoo Hae-jin	Won	
Baeksang Arts Awards	2026	Best Film	The King's Warden	Nominated	
Baeksang Arts Awards	2026	Gucci Impact Award	The King's Warden	Won	
Baeksang Arts Awards	2026	Best Director	Jang Hang-jun	Nominated	
Baeksang Arts Awards	2026	Best Actor	Yoo Hae-jin	Nominated	
Baeksang Arts Awards	2026	Best Supporting Actor	Yoo Ji-tae	Nominated	
Baeksang Arts Awards	2026	Best Supporting Actress	Jeon Mi-do	Nominated	
Baeksang Arts Awards	2026	Best New Actor	Park Ji-hoon	Won	
Blue Dragon Film Awards	2026	Best Film	The King's Warden	Pending	
Blue Dragon Film Awards	2026	Best Director	Jang Hang-jun	Pending	
Blue Dragon Film Awards	2026	Best Actor	Yoo Hae-jin	Pending	
Blue Dragon Film Awards	2026	Best Supporting Actress	Jeon Mi-do	Pending	
Blue Dragon Film Awards	2026	Best New Actor	Park Ji-hoon	Pending	
Blue Dragon Film Awards	2026	Best Screenplay	Jang Hang-jun, Hwang Seong-gu	Pending	
Blue Dragon Film Awards	2026	Best Art Direction	Bae Jung-yoon	Pending	
Buil Film Awards	2026	Best Director	Jang Hang-jun	Nominated	
Buil Film Awards	2026	Best Actor	Yoo Hae-jin	Won	
Buil Film Awards	2026	Best Actor	Park Ji-hoon	Nominated	
Buil Film Awards	2026	Best Supporting Actor	Yoo Ji-tae	Nominated	
Buil Film Awards	2026	Best Supporting Actress	Jeon Mi-do	Nominated	
Buil Film Awards	2026	Best New Actor	Park Ji-hoon	Nominated	
Buil Film Awards	2026	Best Music	Dalpalan	Nominated	
Buil Film Awards	2026	Male Star of the Year	Park Ji-hoon	Won	
Buil Film Awards	2026	Female Star of the Year	Jeon Mi-do	Won	
Director's Cut Awards	2026	Best Director (Film)	Jang Hang-jun	Nominated	
Director's Cut Awards	2026	Best Screenplay (Film)	Jang Hang-jun, Hwang Seong-gu	Nominated	
Director's Cut Awards	2026	Best Actress (Film)	Jeon Mi-do	Nominated	
Director's Cut Awards	2026	Best Actor (Film)	Yoo Hae-jin	Won	
Director's Cut Awards	2026	Best New Actress (Film)	Jeon Mi-do	Nominated	
Director's Cut Awards	2026	Best New Actor (Film)	Park Ji-hoon	Won	
Far East Film Festival	2026	Audience Award	The King's Warden	3rd Place	
Golden Cinematography Awards	2026	Best Picture	The King's Warden	Won	
Golden Cinematography Awards	2026	Best Director	Jang Hang-jun	Won	
Golden Cinematography Awards	2026	Best Actor	Yoo Hae-jin	Won	
Golden Cinematography Awards	2026	Supporting Actor	Yoo Ji-tae	Won	
Korea Entertainment Awards	2026	Best Director of the Year	Jang Hang-jun	Won	
Korean Association of Film Critics Awards	2026	Best New Actor	Park Ji-hoon	Won	
Korean Association of Film Critics Awards	2026	Top 10 Films of the Year	The King's Warden	Won	

=== Plagiarism allegation ===
In May 2026, the family of the screenwriter of the TV drama Eom Heung-do sought a court injunction to halt the film's screening, alleging unauthorized use of elements from the writer's script. In July 2026, the Seoul Western District Court dismissed the request, ruling that the two works differed substantially in storyline and theme despite some similar settings.
