= Jangneung (Danjong) =

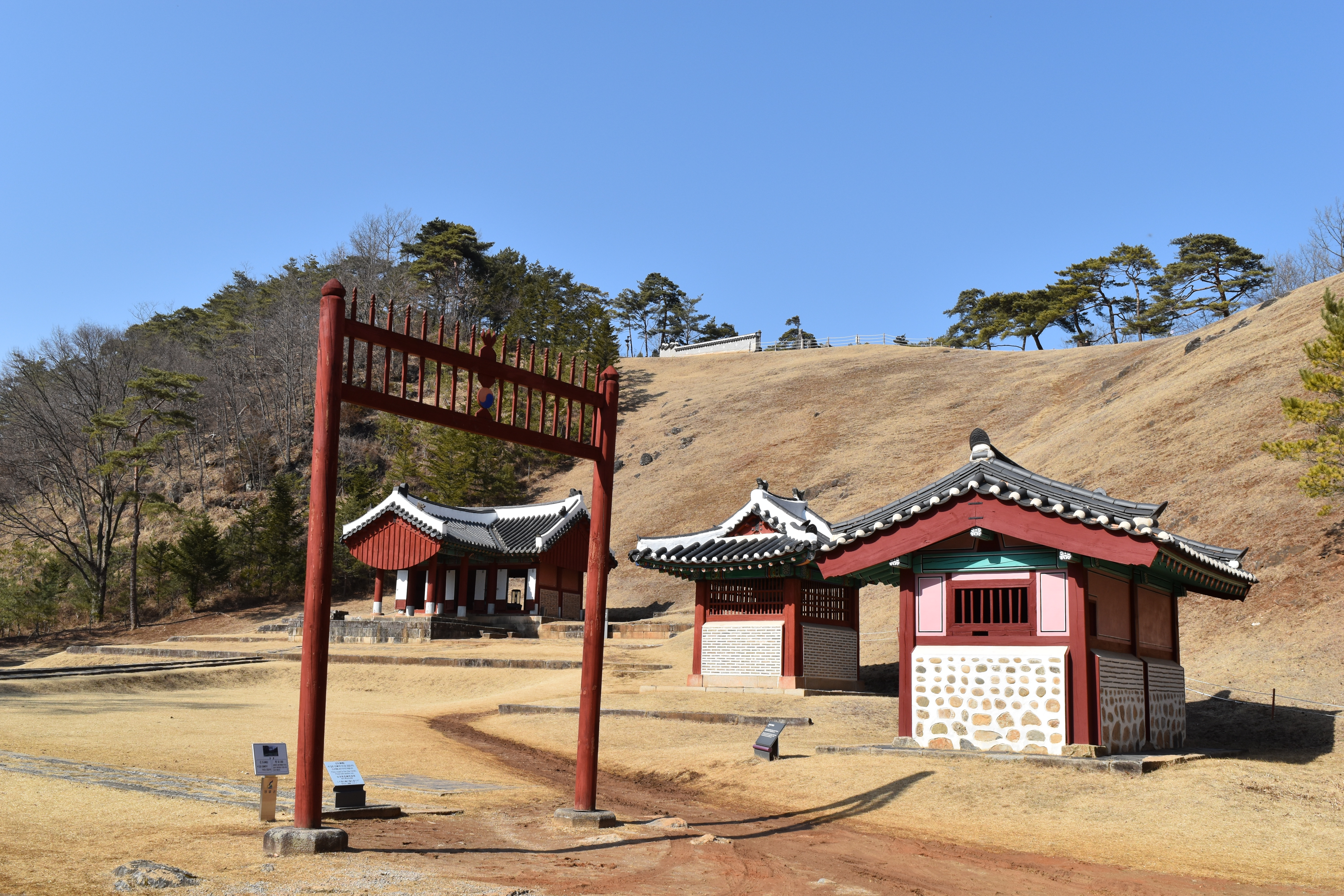
- Jangneung in 2018
- Interactive map of Jangneung
- 37.1974°N 128.4529°E
- Location: Yeongwol, Gangwon Province, South Korea

UNESCO World Heritage Site
- Type: Cultural
- Criteria: iii, iv, vi
- Designated: 2009
- Part of: Royal Tombs of the Joseon Dynasty

Historic Sites of South Korea
- Official name: Jangneung Royal Tomb, Yeongwol
- Designated: 1970

Jangneung (Korean: 장릉; Hanja: 莊陵) is the tomb of King Danjong, the 6th king of Joseon. It is in Yeongwol County, Gangwon Province, South Korea. It was designated as a Historic Site in 1970 and a World Heritage Site in 2009 as one of the Royal Tombs of the Joseon Dynasty.

== History ==
King Danjong was exiled to Yeongwol and passed away in 1457 after he was dethroned by Grand Prince Suyang. No one buried King Danjong's body in fear of punishment but Eom Heung-do, hojang of Yeongwol, held a funeral for him. He secretly buried the body in his family grave and ran away, which is why Jangneung is the only royal tomb of the Joseon Dynasty outside the Seoul metropolitan area. The residents also did not report Eom's whereabouts and maintained the tomb.

In 1516, Park Chung-won, gunsu of Yeongwol, found the tomb and held a jesa 25 years later. During the reign of King Seonjo, stone sculptures such as sangseok, pyoseok, jangmyeong, and mangjuseok were built. In 1698 (the 24th year of King Sukjong's reign), King Danjong was reinstated and his tomb was named Jangneung.

== Facilities ==
Unlike other royal tombs where the hongsalmun, jeongjagak and the tomb are placed in a straight line, they form a "ㄱ" shape in Jangneung. Also, there are memorial facilities that are not found in other royal tombs. Jangpanok (장판옥; 藏版屋) houses 268 spirit tablets of loyalists and Baesikdan (배식단; 配食壇) is an altar for them. Eom Heung-do Jeongnyeogak was established in 1726 according to King Yeongjo's order.

Yeongcheon (영천; 靈泉) is a well created by Park Gi-jeong, busa of Yeongwol, in 1791 to commemorate King Danjong. It is located west of Jangneung.

Danjong Historical Museum was established in 2002. Visitors can see relics related to King Danjong here.

== Events ==
Danjong Ritual (단종제례) started in 1516 when King Jungjong sent Shin Sang to comfort the soul of King Danjong. It was established in 1698. It is designated as Intangible Cultural Heritage of Gangwon Province.

== Gallery ==
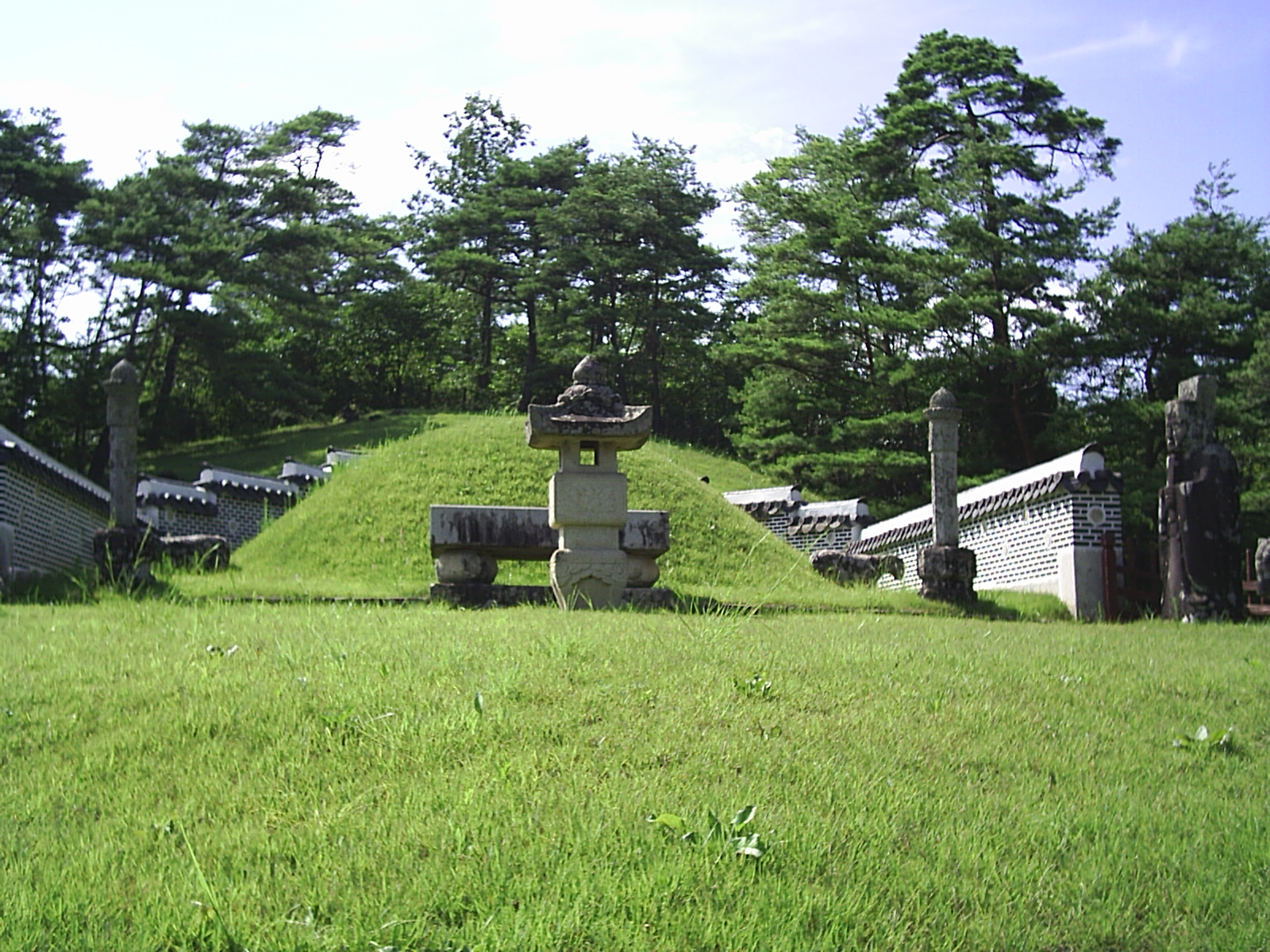
Tomb of Danjong

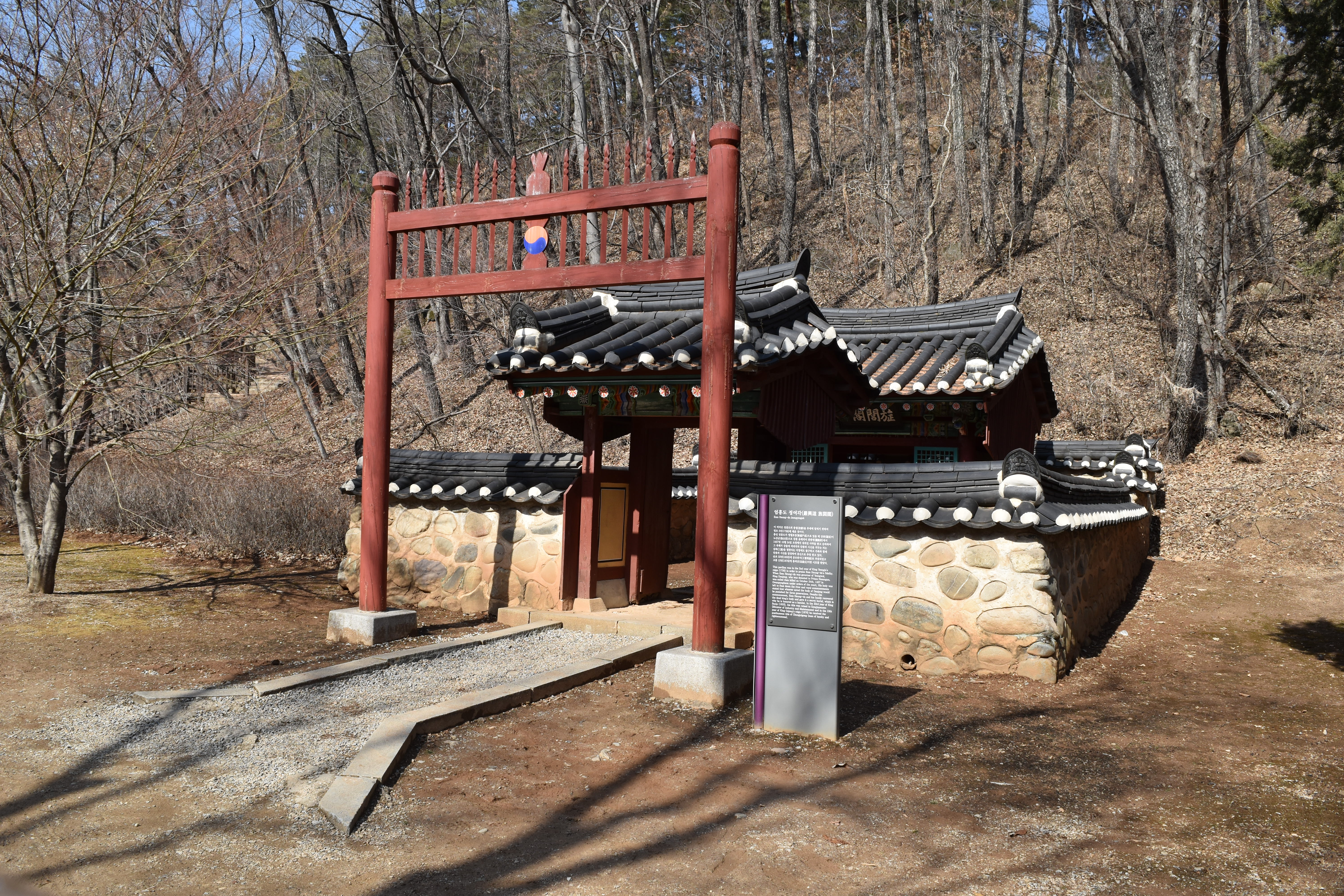
Eom Heung-do Jeongnyeogak

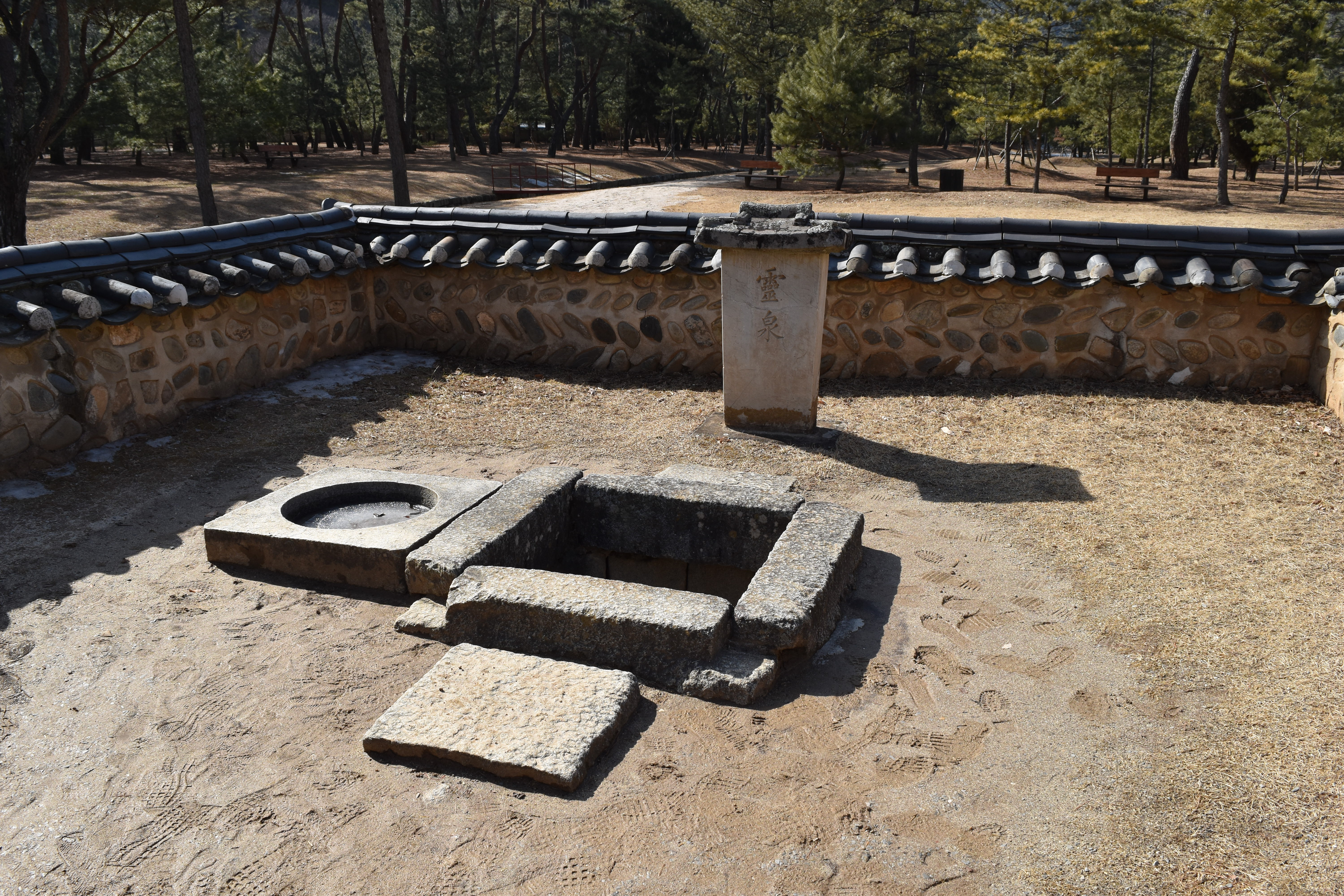
Yeongcheon

== External link ==
- Media related to Jangneung (Danjong) at Wikimedia Commons
