= Gyejoksan =

- Gyejoksan (Gangwon) in the county of Yeongwol, Gangwon-do in South Korea. 890 metres.
- Gyejoksan (Daejeon) in the district of Daedeok, Daejeon. 429 metres.
- Gyejoksan (Suncheon/Gwangyang) in the cities of Suncheon and Gwangyang, Jeollanam-do. 682 metres.
- Gyejoksan (Gurye) in the county of Gurye, Jeollanam-do. 703 metres.
