= Danjong of Joseon =

King of Joseon from 1452 to 1455

Danjong
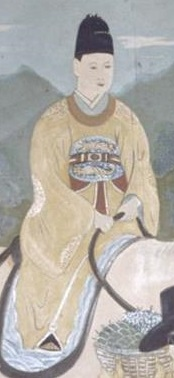
- Reproduction of a portrait, c. 1926

King Emeritus of Joseon
- Tenure: 4 July 1455 – 21 July 1457
- Predecessor: Taejong
- Successor: Sejo

King of Joseon
- Reign: 10 June 1452 – 4 July 1455
- Enthronement: 14 June 1452; Geunjeongjeon, Gyeongbokgung
- Predecessor: Munjong
- Successor: Sejo

Crown Prince of Joseon
- Tenure: 5 September 1450 – 10 June 1452
- Predecessor: Crown Prince Hyang
- Successor: Crown Prince Chang

Grand Heir of Joseon
- Tenure: 14 May 1448 – 5 September 1450
- Predecessor: None
- Successor: Grand Heir Yeon
- Born: 18 August 1441; Jaseondang, Gyeongbokgung, Hanseong, Joseon
- Died: 16 November 1457 (aged 16); Yeongwol County, Gangwon Province, Joseon
- Burial: Jangneung, Yeongwol County, South Korea
- Spouse: Queen Jeongsun (m. 1454)
Names
- Yi Hong-wi (이홍위; 李弘暐)
Era dates
- Adopted the era name of the Ming dynasty (Note: Gyeongtae (Jingtai) (경태; 景泰): 1452–1455)
Regnal name
- Gongui Onmun (공의온문; 恭懿溫文) (Note: Known as honorific name (존호; 尊號) in the Sinosphere, its closest equivalent in the English-speaking world is the regnal name.)
Posthumous name
- Joseon: Great King Sunjeong Anjang Gyeongsun Donhyo (순정안장경순돈효대왕; 純定安莊景順敦孝大王)
Temple name
- Danjong (단종; 端宗)
- Clan: Jeonju Yi
- Dynasty: Yi
- Father: King Munjong
- Mother: Queen Hyeondeok
- Religion: Confucianism (Neo-Confucianism)

Korean name
- Hangul: 단종
- Hanja: 端宗
- Lit.: "Upright Ancestor"
- RR: Danjong
- MR: Tanjong

Royal title
- Hangul: 노산군
- Hanja: 魯山君
- RR: Nosangun
- MR: Nosan'gun

Danjong (Korean: 단종; Hanja: 端宗; 18 August 1441 – 16 November 1457), (Note: In the Korean calendar (lunisolar), he was born on the 23rd day of the 7th lunar month and died on the 21st day of the 10th lunar month.) personal name Yi Hong-wi, was the sixth monarch of Joseon. He acceded to the throne at the age of 11, upon the death of his sickly father, King Munjong. Three years later, he was forced to abdicate by his uncle, Grand Prince Suyang (King Sejo), and was subsequently put to death after having been demoted to princely rank and exiled.

== Biography ==
The future Danjong was born during the reign of his grandfather, King Sejong. His mother, Crown Princess Gwon (posthumously Queen Hyeondeok), didn't recover after giving birth and died the next day. He had one elder sister, Princess Gyeonghye, and one elder half-sister, Princess Gyeongsuk.

In 1452, Yi Hong-wi succeeded his father, King Munjong. Since he was too young to rule, the governing of the country fell to Chief State Councilor Hwangbo In, and Left State Councilor General Kim Chongsŏ, along with Princess Gyeonghye acting as his guardian.

In 1453, this government was overthrown in a coup d'état led by his uncle, Grand Prince Suyang (posthumously King Sejo), who persuaded a number of scholars and officials who had served in the court of Sejong the Great to support his claim to the throne. Hwangbo In and Kim Chongsŏ were killed in front of the gate of Gyeongbokgung.

In late January 1454, the 14-year-old king married the 15-year-old daughter of Song Hyeon-su of the Yeosan Song clan (later known as Queen Jeongsun). In 1455, he was forced to abdicate and became the king emeritus while his wife became Queen Dowager Uideok.

The following year, six court officials attempted to restore him to power, but their plot was discovered and they were immediately executed. Yi Hong-wi was later demoted to Prince Nosan (노산군) and exiled to Cheongnyeongpo, Yeongwol. His wife was also sent out of the palace after losing her status as queen dowager and being demoted to princess consort.

Initially, Sejo was hesitant to execute Danjong and showed mercy despite the attempted coup. However, beginning to perceive that Danjong would present a continuing threat to his rule, Sejo accepted the advice of the court and ordered that his nephew be disposed of. In November 1457, he was put to death.

Historical records conflict on the circumstances of Danjong's death. In the Veritable Records of the Joseon Dynasty, Danjong is recorded as voluntarily hanging himself after the execution of his sympathizers. In this version, Danjong is buried with proper funeral rites, and Sejo is not directly responsible for his death.

However, during the reign of King Seonjo, a senior official recounted that Danjong was poisoned by a royal inspector, on orders from Sejo. During the reign of King Sukjong, another account of Danjong's death entered the official record. In this version, a royal inspector named Wang Bang-yeo is ordered to execute Danjong. However, Wang hesitates to do so, and one of Danjong's scholars volunteers to do so instead. The scholar immediately bleeds, resulting in his death, implying the execution was not sanctioned by Heaven.

The Yeollyeosil Gisul, written by 18th-century scholar Yi Geung-ik, elaborates on the previous account. Yi writes that a court attendant "fastened a long cord to a bowstring and pulled it tight through a window behind the seated king", implying Danjong was executed by strangulation.

It is said Sejo ordered his body to be dumped in a river where it flowed to Yeongwol and decreed that anyone giving him a proper burial would face execution. Eom Heung-do, hojang of Yeongwol, held a funeral for him and secretly buried the body in his family grave, which later became Jangneung. To escape retribution, he went into hiding for the remainder of his life. Honored by Koreans as a "loyal subject to the rightful king", his act continues to be commemorated annually in the village, where locals reenact the king's funeral. The town also features a statue of him holding Danjong's body.

There was an attempt to honor the late king and queen during Jungjong's reign, but he rejected the proposal. During the reign of King Sukjong scholars once again proposed the restoration of the titles. After 200 years, in 1698, the demoted Prince Nosan and his wife were finally restored, receiving the temple name "Danjong", and posthumous name "Queen Jeongsun".

== Legacy ==
In modern South Korea, Danjong's life and death are well-known, with film critic Kim Do-hoo stating, "The story of Danjong is old, but it is never outdated." Kim compared Danjong's life to a Shakespearean tragedy, noting that it has "moved generations".

The 2026 film The King's Warden, which centered around the exile of Danjong, became South Korea's highest grossing film and led to a renewed interest in Danjong. Visits to Cheongnyeongpo, the site of exile, increased fivefold compared to 2025. Sales of books related to Danjong similarly increased approximately 80 times compared to the same period in 2025.

== Worship ==
In Korean shamanism, Danjong is worshiped as one of Wangshin (Korean: 왕신; Hanja: 王神; lit. 'King god').

== Family ==
- Father: King Munjong (문종대왕; 15 November 1414 – 10 June 1452)
  - Grandfather: King Sejong (세종대왕; 15 May 1397 – 8 April 1450)
  - Grandmother: Queen Soheon (소헌왕후), of the Cheongsong Shim clan (청송 심씨; 20 October 1395 – 28 April 1446)
- Mother: Queen Hyeondeok (현덕왕후), of the Andong Gwon clan (안동 권씨; 26 April 1418 – 19 August 1441)
  - Grandfather: Gwon Jeon (권전), Internal Prince Hwasan (화산부원군; 1371–1441)
  - Grandmother: Internal Princess Consort Haeryeong (해령부부인), of the Haeju Choe clan (해주 최씨; ?–1456)

Consort(s)

- Queen Jeongsun (정순왕후), of the Yeosan Song clan (여산 송씨; 10 March 1440 – 17 July 1521)
- Sugui (숙의), of the Sangsan Kim clan (상산 김씨; c. 1440–1525)
- Sugui (숙의), of the Andong Gwon clan (안동 권씨), given name Jung-bi (중비)

== Ancestry ==
Ancestors of Danjong of Joseon

King Taejo (태조대왕)
King Taejong (태종대왕)
Queen Sinui, of the Cheongju Han clan (신의왕후 청주 한씨)
King Sejong (세종대왕)
Min Je, Internal Prince Yeoheung (여흥부원군 민제)
Queen Wongyeong, of the Yeoheung Min clan (원경왕후 여흥 민씨)
Grand Princess Consort of Samhan State, of the Yeosan Song clan (삼한국대부인 여산 송씨)
King Munjong (문종대왕)
Shim Deok-bu (심덕부)
Shim On, Internal Prince Cheongcheon (청천부원군 심온)
Lady, of the Incheon Mun clan (인천 문씨)
Queen Soheon, of the Cheongsong Shim clan (소헌왕후 청송 심씨)
An Cheon-bo (안천보)
Grand Princess Consort of Samhan State, of the Sunheung An clan (삼한국대부인 순흥 안씨)
Lady, of the Yeongju Kim clan (영주 김씨)
King Danjong
Gwon Jeong-jung (권정중)
Gwon Baek-jong (권백종)
Gwon Jeon, Internal Prince Hwasan (화산부원군 권전)
Lady, of the Gwon clan (권씨)
Queen Hyeondeok, of the Andong Gwon clan (현덕왕후 안동 권씨)
Choe Yong (최용)
Internal Princess Consort Haeryeong, of the Haeju Choe clan (해령부부인 해주 최씨)
Lady, of the Chungju Ji clan (충주 지씨)

== In popular culture ==
- Portrayed by Lee Min-woo in the 1983 MBC TV series 500 Years of Joseon: Tree with Deep Roots.
- Portrayed by Jung Tae-woo in the 1998–2000 KBS1 TV series The King and the Queen.
- Portrayed by Noh Tae-yeob in the 2011 KBS2 TV series The Princess' Man.
- Portrayed by Chae Sang-woo in the 2011 JTBC TV series Insu, the Queen Mother and the 2013 film The Face Reader .
- Portrayed by Choi Dong-ah in the 2016 KBS1 TV series Jang Yeong-sil.
- Portrayed by Park Ji-hoon in the 2026 film The King's Warden.

== See also ==
- History of Korea
- List of monarchs of Korea
- Styles and titles in Joseon
- Politics of Joseon

== Notes ==
Danjong of Joseon House of Yi Born: 18 August 1441 Died: 16 November 1457
Royal titles
Preceded by Munjong	King of Joseon; 10 June 1452 – 4 July 1455	Succeeded by Sejo
