= Gyejoksan (Gangwon) =

Mountain in South Korea

Highest point
- Elevation: 889.6 m (2,919 ft)

Geography
- Location: South Korea

Korean name
- Hangul: 계족산
- Hanja: 鷄足山
- RR: Gyejoksan
- MR: Kyejoksan

Gyejoksan (Korean: 계족산) is a mountain in Yeongwol County, Gangwon Province, South Korea. It has an elevation of 889.6 m (2,919 ft). This mountain has the Red Clay Trail, an eco-healing walking path that is located atop the first mountain in the country with a barefoot walking theme.

== See also ==
- List of mountains in Korea
