= Queen Jeongsun (Danjong) =

Queen of Joseon from 1454 to 1455

Queen Dowager of Joseon
- Tenure: 4 July 1455 – 21 July 1457
- Predecessor: Queen Dowager Hudeok
- Successor: Queen Dowager Jaseong

Queen Consort of Joseon
- Tenure: 19 February 1454 – 4 July 1455
- Predecessor: Queen Soheon
- Successor: Queen Jeonghui
- Born: 10 March 1440; Jeongeup County, Jeolla Province, Joseon
- Died: 17 July 1521 (aged 81); Hanseong, Joseon
- Burial: Sareung, Namyangju, South Korea
- Spouse: King Danjong (m. 1454; died 1457)
Regnal name
- Uideok (의덕; 懿德) (Note: Known as honorific name (존호; 尊號) in the Sinosphere, its closest equivalent in the English-speaking world is the regnal name.)
Posthumous name
- Queen Dallyang Jegyeong Jeongsun (단량제경정순왕후; 端良齊敬定順王后)
- Clan: Yeosan Song (by birth); Jeonju Yi (by marriage)
- Dynasty: Yi
- Father: Song Hyeon-su, Internal Prince Yeoryang
- Mother: Internal Princess Consort Yeoheung, of the Yeoheung Min clan
- Religion: Buddhism

Korean name
- Hangul: 정순왕후
- Hanja: 定順王后
- RR: Jeongsun wanghu
- MR: Chŏngsun wanghu

Queen Jeongsun (Korean: 정순왕후; Hanja: 定順王后; 10 March 1440 – 17 July 1521), of the Yeosan Song clan, was the wife of King Danjong, the sixth monarch of Joseon. She was queen of Joseon from 1454 until her husband's forced abdication in 1455, and was then briefly styled as Queen Dowager Uideok during the reign of her uncle-in-law, King Sejo, before being deposed in 1457.

== Biography ==
=== Early life and lineage ===
The future Queen Jeongsun was born during the reign of King Sejong, as the eldest child among one son and two daughters. Her father was Song Hyeon-su (송현수) and her mother was a lady from the illustrious Yeoheung Min clan.

Her paternal grandaunt was Princess Consort Yeoseong (여성군부인), the wife of King Jeongjong's seventh son, Prince Sudo (수도군), and her paternal aunt was Grand Princess Consort Daebang (대방부부인), the wife of King Sejong's 15th son, Grand Prince Yeongeung (영응대군). The latter's daughter, County Princess Gilan (길안현주), became a great-great-grandmother of Queen Inheon. Lady Song was also a second cousin of Queen Jangsun and Queen Gonghye on her maternal side.

=== Marriage ===
In 1453, around the age of 13, Lady Song enter Changdeokgung alongside Lady Kim and Lady Gwon (later known as Sugui Gwon) for the consort selection process. She was chosen to become queen, while the two other girls were appointed as royal consorts.

On 19 February 1454, she married the 12-year-old King Danjong. Danjong was too young to rule and had lost both parents, so his elder sister, Princess Gyeonghye, acted as his guardian. Because the princess sided with Hwangbo In and Kim Jeong-seo, all political authority was in their hands.

As Kim Jeong-seo and his faction used the opportunity to curb the power of many members of the royal family, the tension with Grand Prince Suyang (the second son of King Sejong and King Danjong's uncle) greatly increased; not only Suyang himself, but his younger brother, Grand Prince Anpyeong, also sought a chance to gain control of the government.

=== Husband's abdication and later life ===
In 1455, Grand Prince Suyang forced his powerless nephew to abdicate and declared himself king (posthumously King Sejo). As wife of the previous king, Lady Song became queen dowager.

The following year, six officials attempted to restore Danjong to power, but their plot was discovered and they were later executed. Danjong was then demoted to Prince Nosan (노산군) and exiled to Yeongwol County. Lady Song also lost her status as queen dowager, was demoted to princess consort rank, and banished from the palace. Yeongdo Bridge (영도교) over Cheonggyecheon is said to be the place where Danjong and Lady Song met for the last time.

In 1457, Lady Song's father, Song Hyeon-su, and Lady Gwon's father, Gwon Wan (권완), were executed for showing support for Danjong's restoration. This led to Lady Kim living a prosperous life by comparison, as her father, Kim Sa-u (김사우), supported King Sejo and continued to serve in various government posts until his death in 1464. The whereabouts of Lady Song's mother after the sudden downfall of her daughter and the death of her husband are unknown, but records state that she died in 1498.

With even her own family in ruins, she built a thatched hut near Cheongnyongsa Temple (청룡사), outside Dongdaemun, and lived there with her maids. She had a difficult life, surviving on alms begged by her maids and engaging in the dyeing business. When King Sejo learned of this, he offered her a house and supplies, but she refused them. Meanwhile, the women of the neighborhood, feeling pity for her, secretly delivered food to her house.

Perceiving that Danjong would present a continuing threat to his rule, King Sejo accepted the advice of the court and ordered that his nephew be disposed of. In November 1457, he was put to death in his place of exile, less than four months after leaving the capital.

Upon hearing of her husband's death, Lady Song climbed a large rock every morning and evening to weep toward Yeongwol in the east, praying for Danjong's soul. King Yeongjo personally named the site Dongmangbong (동망봉; lit. ''Gazing East Peak'') and had the characters engraved on the rock. During the Japanese colonial period, the nearby area was used as a quarry, and the rock was broken away. As of 2011, a pavilion called Dongmangjeong (동망정) stands on the southern side of Dongmangbong, near Naksan, Jongno District, Seoul.

According to writer and historian Kim Taek-yeong (김택영; 1850–1927), Shin Suk-ju tried to take Lady Song as his slave, but the veridicity of this claim is uncertain. Nevertheless, King Sejo later issued an edict stating, "Although she is of slave status, ensure she cannot be forced to perform slave labor," and to guarantee she remained untouched, Lady Song was sent to Jeongeopwon (정업원; lit. ''Clean Fate Courtyard''), a religious establishment near Changdeokgung that housed noblewomen who had become nuns, including former royal consorts, but also served as a place of banishment for disgraced women from powerful families.

=== Death and aftermath ===
Lady Song died at the age of 81, having survived her husband by 64 years, and was buried within the ancestral burial ground of the Haeju Jeong clan (해주 정씨) (Note: The in-laws of Princess Gyeonghye.) in present-day Namyangju, Gyeonggi Province. Her funeral was conducted according to the protocols for a grand princess consort. She lived through the reigns of eight kings — Sejong, Munjong, Danjong, Sejo, Yejong, Seongjong, Yeonsangun and Jungjong — becoming the longest-lived queen in the history of Joseon. (Note: The wife of Crown Prince Hyomyeong, who was posthumously honored as Queen Sinjeong, passed away at almost exactly the same age (81 years, 4 months and 2 weeks, so one week more than Queen Jeongsun), but she had never been queen consort due to the early death of her husband.)

In the early years of King Jungjong's reign, the Sarim faction, including Jo Gwang-jo, attempted to have Danjong and Lady Song reinstated, but the king rejected the proposal. Subsequently, starting from King Hyeonjong's reign, figures such as Song Si-yeol and Kim Su-hang (김수항) repeatedly proposed their reinstatement, arguing that Sejo had been swayed by the misguided advice of his close associates and that Danjong's execution hadn't been his true intention. It wasn't until 1698, during King Sukjong's reign, that Lady Song was given the posthumous name Jeongsun (정순; lit. ''fixing the order'') and her husband received his temple name. After her spirit tablet was enshrined in Jongmyo, Lady Song's tomb was also designated as Sareung (사릉).

== Titles ==
- During the reign of King Sejong (r. 1418–1450):
  - Lady, of the Yeosan Song clan (여산 송씨; 礪山宋氏; from 10 March 1440)
    - Song Hyeon-su's daughter (송현수의 딸)
    - Lady Song (송씨; 宋氏)
- During the reign of King Danjong (r. 1452–1455):
  - Queen (왕비; 王妃; from 19 February 1454)
- During the reign of King Sejo (r. 1455–1468):
  - Queen Dowager Uideok (의덕왕대비; 懿德王大妃; from 4 July 1455)
  - Princess Consort Nosan (Note: Or Madame Nosan (노산부인; 魯山夫人).) (노산군부인; 魯山君夫人; from 21 July 1457)
- During the reign of King Sukjong (r. 1674–1720):
  - Queen Jeongsun (정순왕후; 定順王后; from 7 December 1698)

== Family ==
- Father: Song Hyeon-su (송현수), Internal Prince Yeoryang (여량부원군; ?–1457)
- Mother: Internal Princess Consort Yeoheung (여흥 민씨), of the Yeoheung Min clan (여흥부부인; 1418–1498)
- Sibling(s)
  - Song Geo (송거; 1449–?)
  - Lady, of the Yeosan Song clan (여산 송씨) (Note: Married Shin Suk (신숙) from the Yeongsan Shin clan (영산 신씨).)
- Husband: King Danjong (단종대왕; 18 August 1441 – 16 November 1457) — No issue.
  - Father-in-law: King Munjong (문종대왕; 15 November 1414 – 10 June 1452)
  - Mother-in-law: Queen Hyeondeok (현덕왕후), of the Andong Gwon clan (안동 권씨; 26 April 1418 – 19 August 1441)

== Ancestry ==
Ancestors of Queen Jeongsun (Danjong)

Song Gye-seong (송계성)
Song Bok-won (송복원)
Song Hyeon-su, Internal Prince Yeoryang (여량부원군 송현수)
Lady, of the Suncheon Kim clan (순천 김씨)
Queen Jeongsun
Min Geun (민근)
Min Jung-rip (민중립)
Lady, of the Andong Gwon clan (안동 권씨)
Min So-saeng (민소생)
Heo Seon (허선)
Lady, of the Yangcheon Heo clan (양천 허씨)
Internal Princess Consort Yeoheung, of the Yeoheung Min clan (여흥부부인 여흥 민씨)
Lady, of the Neungseong Gu clan (능성 구씨)

== In popular culture ==
- Portrayed by Um Aing-ran in the 1956 film The Tragedy of King Danjong.
- Portrayed by Jeon Gye-hyeon in the 1963 film A Sad Story of Danjong.
- Portrayed by Kang Soo-yeon in the 1980 MBC TV series Parting with my Gracious Lord.
- Portrayed by Shin Eun-kyung in the 1990 KBS2 TV series Dance Toward the Broken Heavens.
- Portrayed by Park Lucia in the 1994 KBS2 TV series Han Myung Hoe.
- Portrayed by Kim Min-jung in the 1998–2000 KBS1 TV series The King and the Queen.
- Portrayed by Jo Jung-eun in the 2011–2012 JTBC TV series Insu, the Queen Mother.

== See also ==
- History of Korea
- Styles and titles in Joseon
- Politics of Joseon

== Notes ==
Queen Jeongsun (Danjong) Yeosan Song clan
Royal titles
Preceded by Queen Soheon of the Cheongseong Shim clan	Queen Consort of Joseon; 1454–1455	Succeeded by Queen Jeonghui of the Papyeong Yun clan
Preceded by Queen Dowager Hudeok of the Yeoheung Min clan	Queen Dowager of Joseon; 1455–1457	Succeeded by Queen Dowager Jaseong of the Papyeong Yun clan
