= Eom Heung-do =

Joseon civil servant (1404–1474)

- 엄흥도
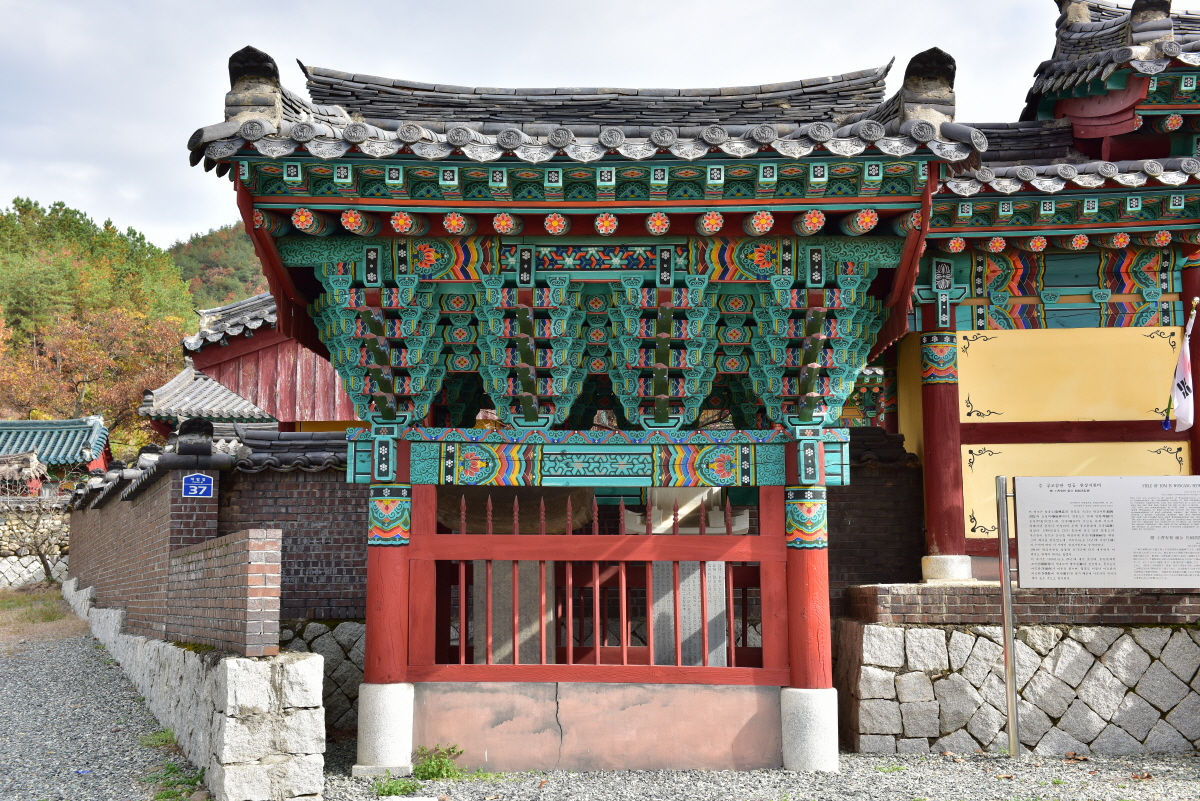
- Stele of Lord Eom at Wongang Seowon
- Born: 1404; Joseon
- Died: 26 February 1474 (aged 69–70); Joseon
- Resting place: Uiheung, Gunwi
- Known for: Secretly recovering and burying the body of Danjong of Joseon
- Title: Chungui (忠毅)
- Children: 3 sons
- Parents: Eom Han-jeo (father); Lady Won of the Wonju Won clan (mother)
- Family: Yeongwol Eom clan

Korean name
- Hangul: 엄흥도
- Hanja: 嚴興道
- RR: Eom Heungdo
- MR: Ŏm Hŭngdo

Eom Heung-do (Korean: 엄흥도; Hanja: 嚴興道; 1404 – 26 February 1474) was a local official during the Joseon dynasty. He is remembered as a figure of loyalty for secretly retrieving and burying the body of the deposed King Danjong in 1457 despite King Sejo's threats.

== Burial of King Danjong and exile ==
Eom Heung-do served as the hojang (local headman) of Yeongwol. In 1457, King Danjong was demoted to Prince Nosan and exiled to Yeongwol after being dethroned by his uncle King Sejo. He was later killed but the cause of his death is disputed: some say that he died from drinking poison while others say that he was killed by strangulation with a bowstring after refusing to drink poison given by King Sejo.

Danjong's body was later thrown into Dong River. Eom retrieved his body, conducted a funeral, and secretly buried him in Dongeulji mountain despite Sejo's threats that anyone who did so would have three generations of their family killed. After the funeral, he fled to Yeongnam and spent the rest of his life in seclusion. Eom's tomb is thought to be in Uiheung, Gunwi.

== Posthumous honors ==
In 1516 (11th year of the reign of King Jungjong), Danjong's grave was found and a burial mound was established. In 1698 (24th year of the reign of King Sukjong), Danjong's royal status was restored and the grave Eom had created became the royal tomb Jangneung.

The Joseon government later honored Eom for his loyalty. During King Sukjong's reign, he was posthumously appointed Gongjo Chamui (Third Minister of Public Works). Under King Yeongjo, a jeongmun (gate of honor) was built in his memory, and his rank was raised to Gongjo Panseo (Minister of Public Works). He was also given the posthumous title Chungui (忠毅, "Loyal and Resolute") and was enshrined at Changjeolsa Shrine in Yeongwol alongside the Sayuksin (Six Martyred Ministers).

In 1733, during the ninth year of King Yeongjo's reign, the Ministry of Military Affairs issued an official decree granting Eom's descendants exemption from military service and labor as a reward for his loyalty and service.

== In popular culture ==
Eom is the main historical figure portrayed in the 2026 South Korean film The King's Warden. After the film's success, the National Library of Korea held a special exhibition from March to May 2026. The exhibition featured the original 1733 Wanmun document issued to Eom's descendants, marking its first public display.
