= Gijeok =

Lists of approved kisaeng in Korea

- Hangul: 기적
- Hanja: 妓籍
- RR: gijeok
- MR: kijŏk

The gijeok (Korean: 기적) was a list of all the kisaeng working in a particular district. It was maintained by the local chief, or hojang. Those not on the list were not permitted to work as kisaeng; those on it were required to. A kisaeng's name could only be removed from the gijeok if she reached retirement age, was purchased, or died.

Gijeok were maintained in both the Goryeo and Joseon dynasties. They first appear in historical records in the reign of King Gojong in the 13th century.

== See also ==
- History of Korea
