= Yeosan Song clan =

Korean clan from North Joella Province

Yeosan Song clan 여산 송씨
- Country: Korea
- Current region: Iksan
- Founder: Song Yu-ik
- Connected members: Song Mingi; Song Kang; Song Hye-kyo; Song Giwon; Song Dae-kwan; Song Du-yul; Song Sang-hyeon; Song Young-gil; Song Yo-chan; Queen Jeongsun; Song Yoo-geun; Song Eun-bum; Song Ikp'il; Song Ju-seok; Song Tae-kon; Song Hae

Yeosan Song clan (Korean: 여산 송씨; Hanja: 礪山 宋氏) is one of the oldest Korean clans. Their Bon-gwan was in Yeosan, present day Iksan, North Jeolla Province. According to the research in 2015, the number of Yeosan Song clan was 298, 231. Their founder was Song Yu-ik (송유익, 宋惟翊). He was a descendant of Song Ju-eun who is the ancestor of the main three Song clans since the Gojoseon days. He became Prince of Yeosan (Hanja: 礪山君) after his great-grandson, Song Song-rye (송송례, 宋松禮) (1207 - 1298), defeated the last military leader Im Yoo-mu (임유무, 林惟茂) (1248 - 1270), who lead the Mushin Government "무신정권" in the Goryeo days and was granted nobility by King Chungryeol of Goryeo. There are claims by Chinese scholars that Song Yu-ik was from the Ministry of Revenue during the Tang Dynasty but it seems only the names were the same but the founder of the clan and the mentioned are two different people as the time period does not match and the Yeosan Song chronicles does not mention anything.
