= Sugui Kim (Danjong) =

Korean royal consort (c. 1440–1525)

- Royal Consort of the Junior Second Rank
- Born: c. 1440; Joseon
- Died: 1525; Chungju-mok, Chungcheong Province, Joseon
- Consort of: King Danjong
- Issue Detail: 1 adopted son
- Clan: Sangsan Kim (by birth); Jeonju Yi (by marriage)
- Dynasty: Yi
- Father: Kim Sa-u
- Mother: Lady, of the Gwangju Yi clan

Korean name
- Hangul: 숙의 김씨
- Hanja: 淑儀 金氏
- RR: Sugui Gimssi
- MR: Sugŭi Kimssi

Sugui Kim (Korean: 숙의 김씨; Hanja: 淑儀 金氏; c. 1440–1525), of the Sangsan Kim clan, was a consort of King Danjong, the sixth monarch of Joseon.

== Biography ==
=== Early life and lineage ===
Lady Kim was born during the reign of King Sejong, but the exact date of birth is unknown. Her father was Kim Sa-u (김사우) and her mother was a lady from the Gwangju Yi clan (광주 이씨).

During the 15th century, her maternal family established themselves as one of the most powerful political forces of the early Joseon period. Her maternal grandfather, Right State Councilor Yi In-son (이인손), was a dominant figure whose alignment with the future King Sejo cemented the clan's long-term status. Her maternal uncles, known as the "Five Geuk" (오극) — Chief State Councilor Yi Geuk-bae (이극배), Minister of Justice Yi Geuk-gam (이극감), Left Assistant State Councilor Yi Geuk-jeung (이극증), Left Associate State Councilor Yi Geuk-don (이극돈) and Left State Councilor Yi Geuk-gyun (이극균) — all eventually achieved ministerial rank, a rare feat that made the family exceptionally influential.

=== As royal consort ===
In 1453, Lady Kim entered Changdeokgung alongside Lady Song and Lady Gwon (later known as Sugui Gwon) for the consort selection process. Lady Song was chosen to become queen, whereas Lady Kim and Lady Gwon were appointed as royal consorts of the junior second rank (숙의; sugui).

Afterwards, she lived in the house of King Sejong's 12th son, Prince Milseong (밀성군), and entered the palace on 19 February 1454 when Lady Song was officially invested as queen. Shortly after entering the palace, Lady Kim fell ill and King Danjong moved her to the residence of his uncle, Grand Prince Suyang.

=== Later life and death ===
In 1455, Grand Prince Suyang (posthumously King Sejo) forced his nephew to abdicate and took over the throne. In 1457, Danjong was exiled and then executed. Earlier that year, Lady Song's father, Song Hyeon-su (송현수), and Lady Gwon's father, Gwon Wan (권완), were executed for showing support for Danjong's restoration. This led to Lady Kim living a prosperous life by comparison, as both her maternal family and her father supported King Sejo; Kim Sa-u would continued to serve in various government posts until his death in 1464 despite impeachments from several officials.

Because she did not have any children, Lady Kim was permitted to adopt a male relative, Yi Yak-bing (이약빙), from her maternal Gwangju Yi clan.

Lady Kim died in Chungju-mok, Chungcheong Province, having survived King Danjong by 68 years. The location of her tomb remains unknown.

== Titles ==
- During the reign of King Sejong (r. 1418–1450):
  - Lady, of the Sangsan Kim clan (상산 김씨; 商山金氏; from unknown date)
    - Kim Sa-u's daughter (김사우의 딸)
    - Lady Kim (김씨; 金氏)
- During the reign of King Danjong (r. 1452–1455):
  - Sugui (Note: lit. ''Lady of Warm Deportment'') (숙의; 淑儀; from 1454), royal consort of the junior second rank

== Family ==
- Father: Kim Sa-u (김사우; 1415–1464)
- Mother: Lady, of the Gwangju Yi clan (광주 이씨; 1420–?)
- Consort of: King Danjong (단종대왕; 18 August 1441 – 16 November 1457)
- Issue
  - Yi Yak-bing (이약빙; 1489–1547) — Adopted. (Note: Great-grandson of Lady Kim's maternal uncle, Yi Geuk-gam (이극감). [Lineage: Yi Geuk-gam → Yi Se-u (이세우) → Yi Ja (이자) → Yi Yak-bing]) (Note: ▪︎Wife: Lady, of the Bugye Hong clan (부계 홍씨); daughter of Hong Eon-seung (홍언승). ▪︎Issue: 2 sons; including Yun Im's second son-in-law, Yi Hong-yun (이홍윤).)

== Ancestry ==
Ancestors of Sugui Kim (Danjong)

Kim Rok (김록)
Kim Deuk-je (김득제)
Kim Heup (김흡)
Kim Sa-u (김사우)
Sugui Kim
Yi Jib (이집)
Yi Ji-jik (이지직)
Lady, of the Hwang clan (황씨)
Yi In-son (이인손)
Lady, of the Gyeongju Yi clan (경주 이씨)
Lady, of the Gwangju Yi clan (광주 이씨)
No Yu (노유)
No Sin (노신)
Lady, of the Wonju Won clan (원주 원씨)
Lady, of the Gyoha No clan (교하 노씨)
Lady, of the Yeoju Yi clan (여주 이씨)

== See also ==
- Styles and titles in Joseon
- History of Korea
