= Hojang =

Local official in the Korean Goryeo and Joseon periods

- Hangul: 호장
- Hanja: 戶長
- RR: hojang
- MR: hojang

The hojang (Korean: 호장) was a local official of low rank during the Goryeo and Joseon periods of Korean history. His role was similar to that of a village headman.

The hojang was responsible for maintaining various local records, including the slave rolls and the gijeok register of working kisaeng.

== See also ==
- History of Korea
- Joseon dynasty politics
