= Yeongwol County =

Coordinates: 37°11′14″N 128°28′24″E

Yeongwol
- County
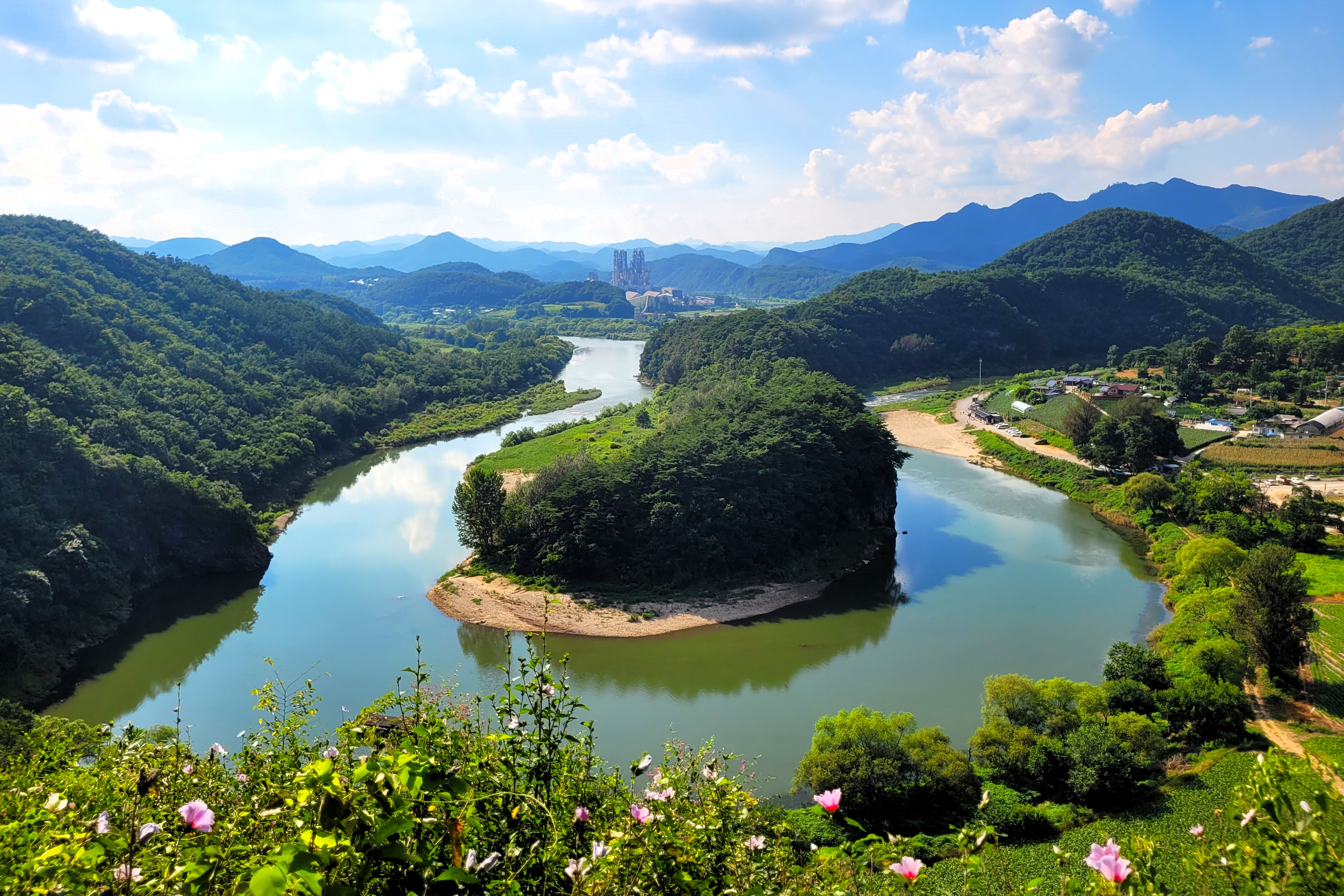
- Miniature Shape of the Korean Peninsula

- Flag

- Location in South Korea
- Country: South Korea
- State: Gangwon
- Administrative divisions: 2 eup, 7 myeon

Area
  - Total: 1,127.36 km^{2} (435.28 sq mi)

Population (February 2026)
  - Total: 35,917
  - Density: 31.9/km^{2} (83/sq mi)
  - Dialect: Gangwon

Korean name
- Hangul: 영월군
- Hanja: 寧越郡
- RR: Yeongwol-gun
- MR: Yŏngwŏl-gun

Yeongwol County (Korean: 영월군) is a county in Gangwon Province, South Korea. Its population is about 36,000 as of 2026. Its economy has traditionally relied on agriculture and mining. It is historically associated with King Danjong who was exiled there in 1457. It is also known for its natural landscapes.

== History ==
Originally a part of Jinhan, Yeongwol (then called Baekwol) became a part of Baekje in the 4th century. After Goguryeo invaded Baekje, it became a part of Goguryeo and was called Naesaeng-hyeon (내생현; 奈生縣). After Silla unified the three kingdoms, it was renamed Naeseong-gun (내성군; 奈城郡). It later became a part of Goryeo and was renamed Yeongwol.

In 1457, King Danjong, the sixth king of Joseon, was exiled to Yeongwol when he was forced to abdicate by his uncle who became King Sejo. He was buried there after he was killed. The poet Kim Byeong-yeon was also buried in Yeongwol.

== Industry ==
The main agricultural products are rice, barley, corn and potatoes.

Anthracite is mined in Yeongwol-eup and Buk-myeon. Silicate mineral and pagodite are mined in Jucheon-myeon. Mica is mined in Gimsatgat-myeon. Sangdong-eup has the world's largest store of tungsten which accounted for more than half of South Korea's exports in the 1960s. Mining used to flourish because there were many underground resources buried in the county due to its geological structure. However, the number of mines decreased significantly due to the coal rationalization policy and import of Chinese resources.

== Education ==
Yeongwol Hyanggyo was established in 1398.

As of 2015, there are 19 elementary schools, 11 middle schools, 6 high schools and Saekyung University.

== Administrative divisions ==
In 2009, Hadong-myeon was renamed to Gimsatgat-myeon and Seo-myeon was renamed to Hanbando-myeon. In 2016, Suju-myeon was renamed to Mureungdowon-myeon.

| Name | Korean text | Area (km^{2}) | Population (2026) | Map |
|---|---|---|---|---|
| Yeongwol-eup | 영월읍 | 172.4 | 19,240 | |
| Sangdong-eup | 상동읍 | 139.8 | 1,009 | |
| Sansol-myeon | 산솔면 | 124.7 | 1,360 | |
| Gimsatgat-myeon | 김삿갓면 | 171.3 | 1,758 | |
| Buk-myeon | 북면 | 111.1 | 1,962 | |
| Nam-myeon | 남면 | 82.1 | 2,101 | |
| Hanbando-myeon | 한반도면 | 69.9 | 2,595 (including Ssangyong) | |
| Jucheon-myeon | 주천면 | 102.5 | 3,786 | |
| Mureungdowon-myueon | 무릉도원면 | 153.6 | 2,106 | |
| Total | | 1,127.3 | 35,917 | |

== Geology ==
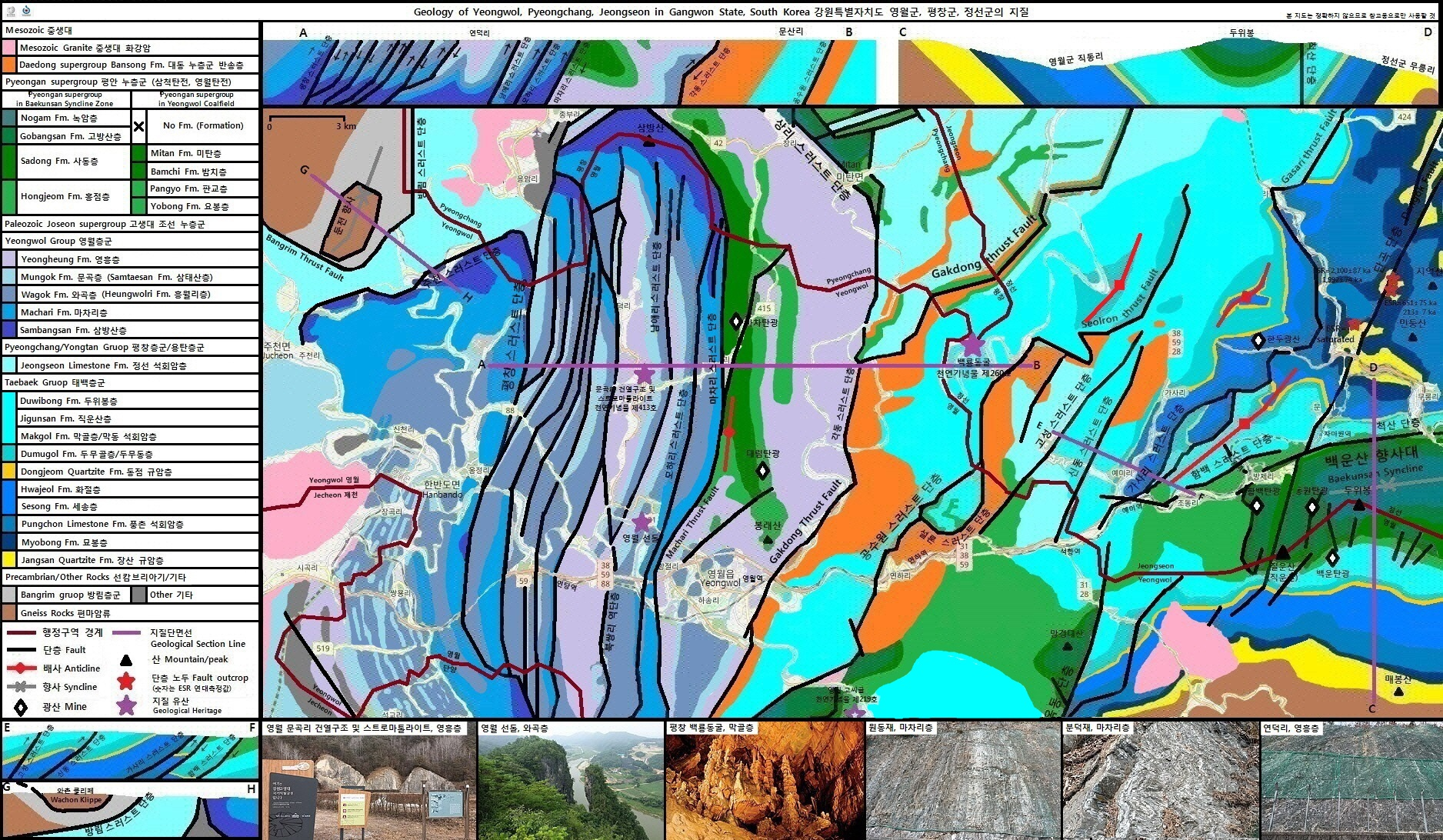
Geology of Yeongwol County

Most of Yeongwol is included in the Okcheon Belt. Joseon Supergroup and Pyeongan Supergoup which have limestone and anthracite are distributed in the region.

=== Notable sites ===
Seondol is a rock pillar shaped as if it was split with a large knife. It is designated as a Scenic Site.

Gossigul is a cave where the Go family hid during the Imjin War. It is designated as a Natural Monument. It has well-developed stalactite and stalagmite and is inhabited by organisms that only live in caves.

Potholes on Yoseonam in Mureung-ri is designated as a Natural Monument. It has great academic value because it shows fluvial erosion.

Miniature Shape of the Korean Peninsula, located at the end of the Pyeongchang River, is designated as a Scenic Site.

== Climate ==
Yeongwol has a monsoon-influenced humid continental climate (Köppen: Dwa) with cold, dry winters and hot, rainy summers.

Climate data for Yeongwol (1995–2020 normals, extremes 1995–present)
| Month | Jan | Feb | Mar | Apr | May | Jun | Jul | Aug | Sep | Oct | Nov | Dec | Year |
|---|---|---|---|---|---|---|---|---|---|---|---|---|---|
| Record high °C (°F) | 14.1 (57.4) | 20.9 (69.6) | 26.6 (79.9) | 33.3 (91.9) | 35.3 (95.5) | 36.8 (98.2) | 38.5 (101.3) | 39.9 (103.8) | 33.6 (92.5) | 29.8 (85.6) | 25.1 (77.2) | 15.5 (59.9) | 38.7 (101.7) |
| Mean daily maximum °C (°F) | 2.5 (36.5) | 5.8 (42.4) | 11.8 (53.2) | 18.8 (65.8) | 24.4 (75.9) | 28.1 (82.6) | 29.2 (84.6) | 29.9 (85.8) | 25.5 (77.9) | 20.0 (68.0) | 11.9 (53.4) | 4.2 (39.6) | 17.7 (63.9) |
| Daily mean °C (°F) | −3.6 (25.5) | −0.8 (30.6) | 4.9 (40.8) | 11.5 (52.7) | 17.0 (62.6) | 21.3 (70.3) | 23.9 (75.0) | 24.3 (75.7) | 19.2 (66.6) | 12.6 (54.7) | 5.3 (41.5) | −1.7 (28.9) | 11.2 (52.2) |
| Mean daily minimum °C (°F) | −9.2 (15.4) | −6.8 (19.8) | −1.5 (29.3) | 4.3 (39.7) | 10.0 (50.0) | 15.6 (60.1) | 20.1 (68.2) | 20.5 (68.9) | 14.7 (58.5) | 7.1 (44.8) | −0.1 (31.8) | −7.0 (19.4) | 5.6 (42.1) |
| Record low °C (°F) | −23.5 (−10.3) | −23.1 (−9.6) | −15.5 (4.1) | −6.9 (19.6) | 1.7 (35.1) | 4.1 (39.4) | 10.8 (51.4) | 11.5 (52.7) | 3.7 (38.7) | −5.6 (21.9) | −11.7 (10.9) | −19.5 (−3.1) | −23.5 (−10.3) |
| Average precipitation mm (inches) | 19.1 (0.75) | 28.2 (1.11) | 45.1 (1.78) | 73.5 (2.89) | 78.4 (3.09) | 137.1 (5.40) | 294.8 (11.61) | 280.4 (11.04) | 139.4 (5.49) | 49.4 (1.94) | 37.4 (1.47) | 22.3 (0.88) | 1,205.1 (47.44) |
| Average precipitation days (≥ 0.1 mm) | 6.7 | 6.3 | 8.3 | 9.0 | 8.9 | 10.2 | 16.4 | 15.1 | 10.0 | 6.2 | 8.2 | 6.8 | 112.1 |
| Average snowy days | 9.2 | 7.1 | 5.3 | 0.2 | 0.0 | 0.0 | 0.0 | 0.0 | 0.0 | 0.1 | 2.3 | 6.1 | 30.3 |
| Average relative humidity (%) | 63.5 | 59.8 | 57.8 | 55.6 | 62.6 | 69.4 | 79.8 | 79.7 | 77.7 | 74.0 | 69.6 | 67.1 | 68.1 |
| Mean monthly sunshine hours | 179.9 | 177.6 | 202.2 | 209.2 | 225.9 | 196.5 | 138.8 | 155.0 | 155.9 | 179.7 | 151.5 | 170.6 | 2,142.8 |
| Percentage possible sunshine | 58.0 | 56.6 | 52.0 | 52.6 | 48.7 | 42.6 | 29.7 | 35.5 | 41.4 | 50.3 | 50.0 | 57.7 | 46.9 |
Source: Korea Meteorological Administration (snow and percent sunshine 1981–2010)

== Culture ==
=== Heritage ===
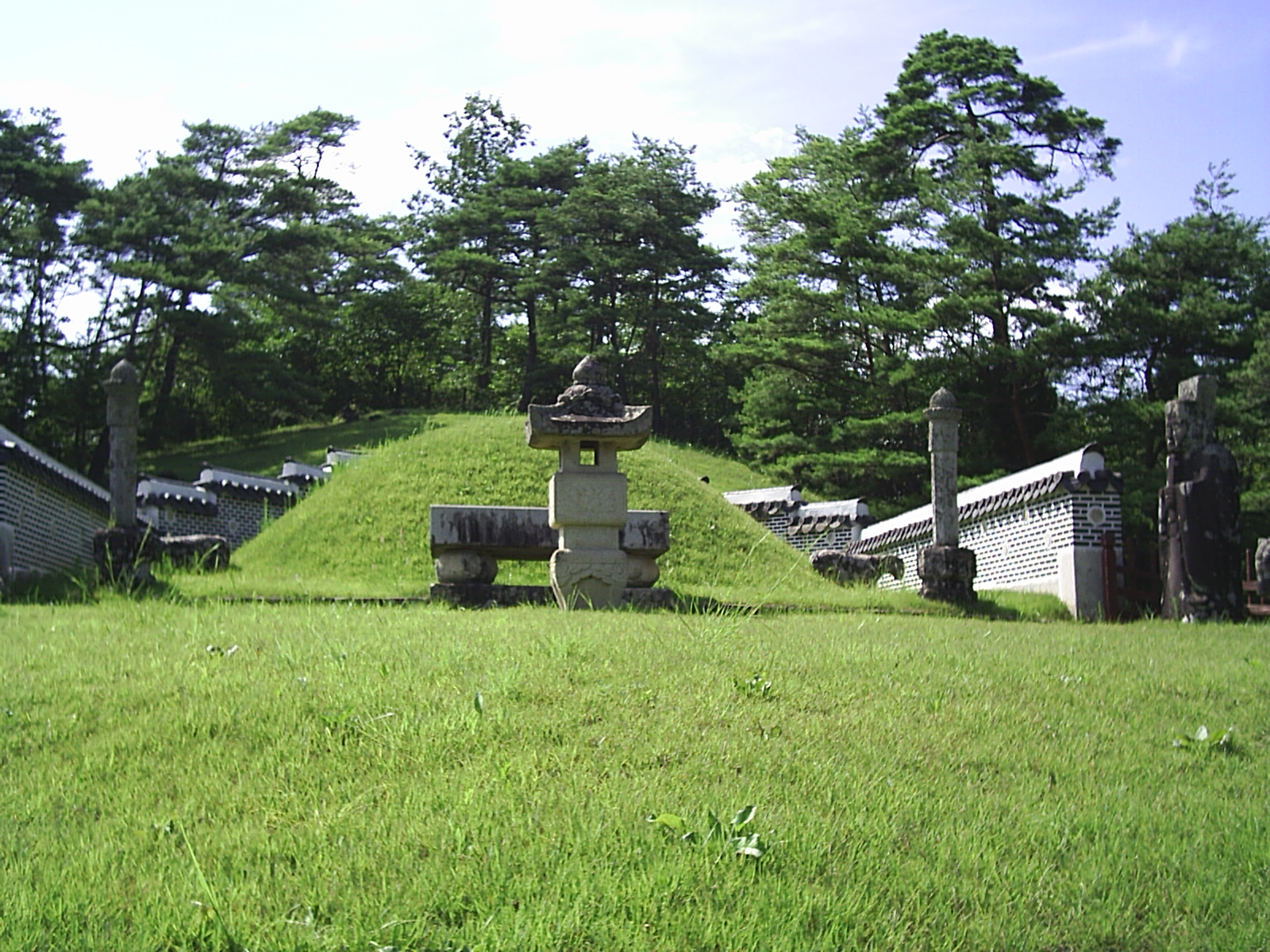
Jangneung

Jangneung is the tomb of King Danjong. It was designated as a Historic Site in 1970 and a UNESCO World Heritage Site as one of the Royal Tombs of the Joseon Dynasty in 2009.

Cheongnyeongpo is where King Danjong was banished. It is designated as a Scenic Site.

=== Museums ===
There are 22 museums and 12 art museums such as Youngwol Y Park.

=== Food ===
Chikguksu (East Asian arrowroot noodles) is well known.

=== Festival ===
Danjong Culture Festival honors King Danjong and loyalists. It has been held annually since 1967.

DongGang International Photo Festival is held every year. It has events such as the DongGang Photography Award Exhibition, International Open Call, Photojournalists Exhibition and Gangwon Province Photographers Exhibition.

== Notable people ==
- Eom Heung-do (1404-1474), local official
- Boom (1982-), entertainer

== Sister cities ==
- Japan: Higashikawa, Hokkaido
- China: Tailai County, Zigui County

== Gallery ==
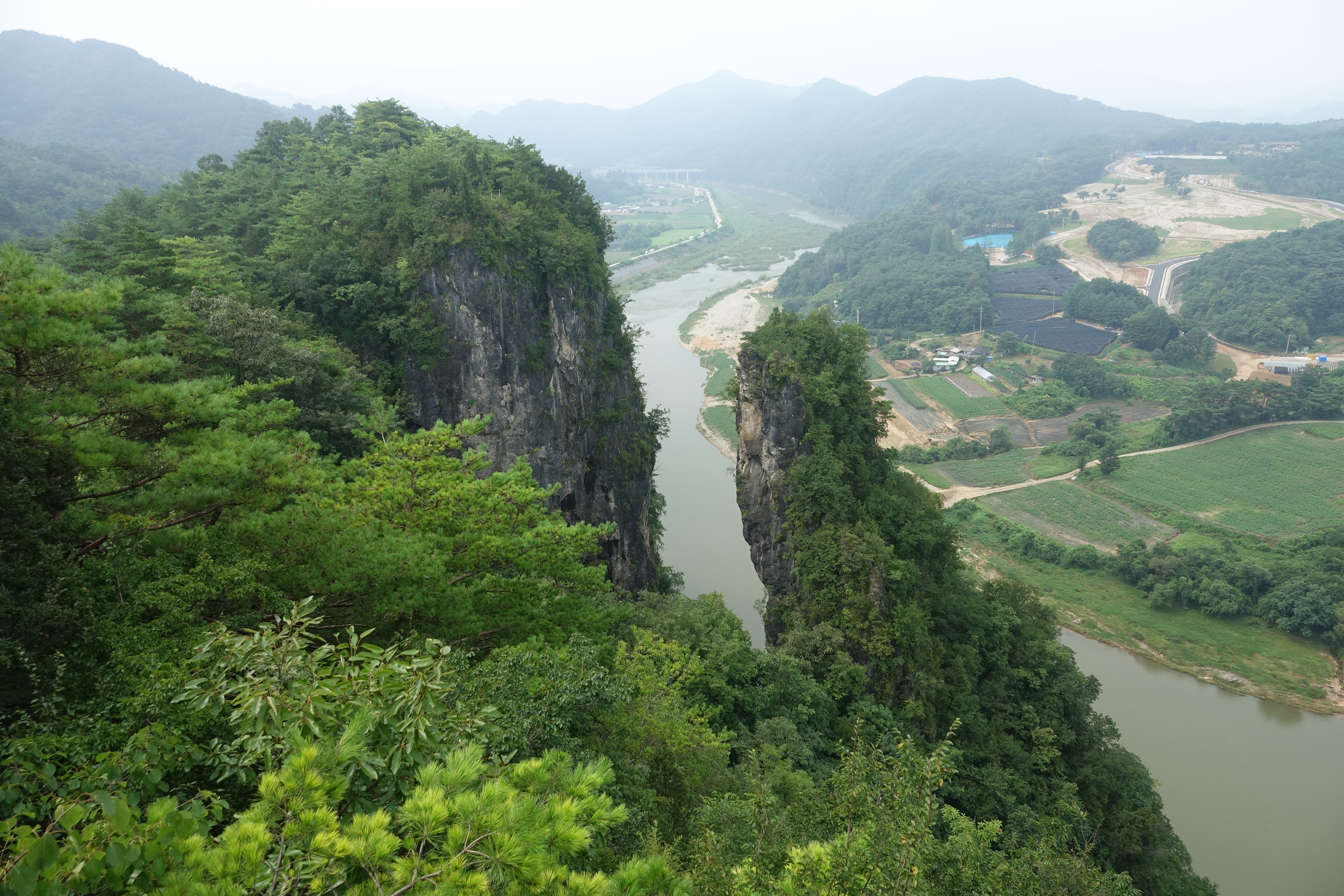
Seondol

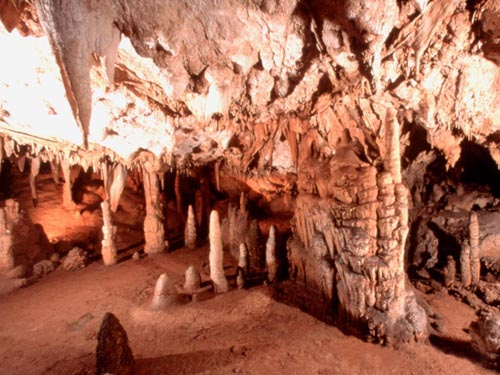
Gossigul

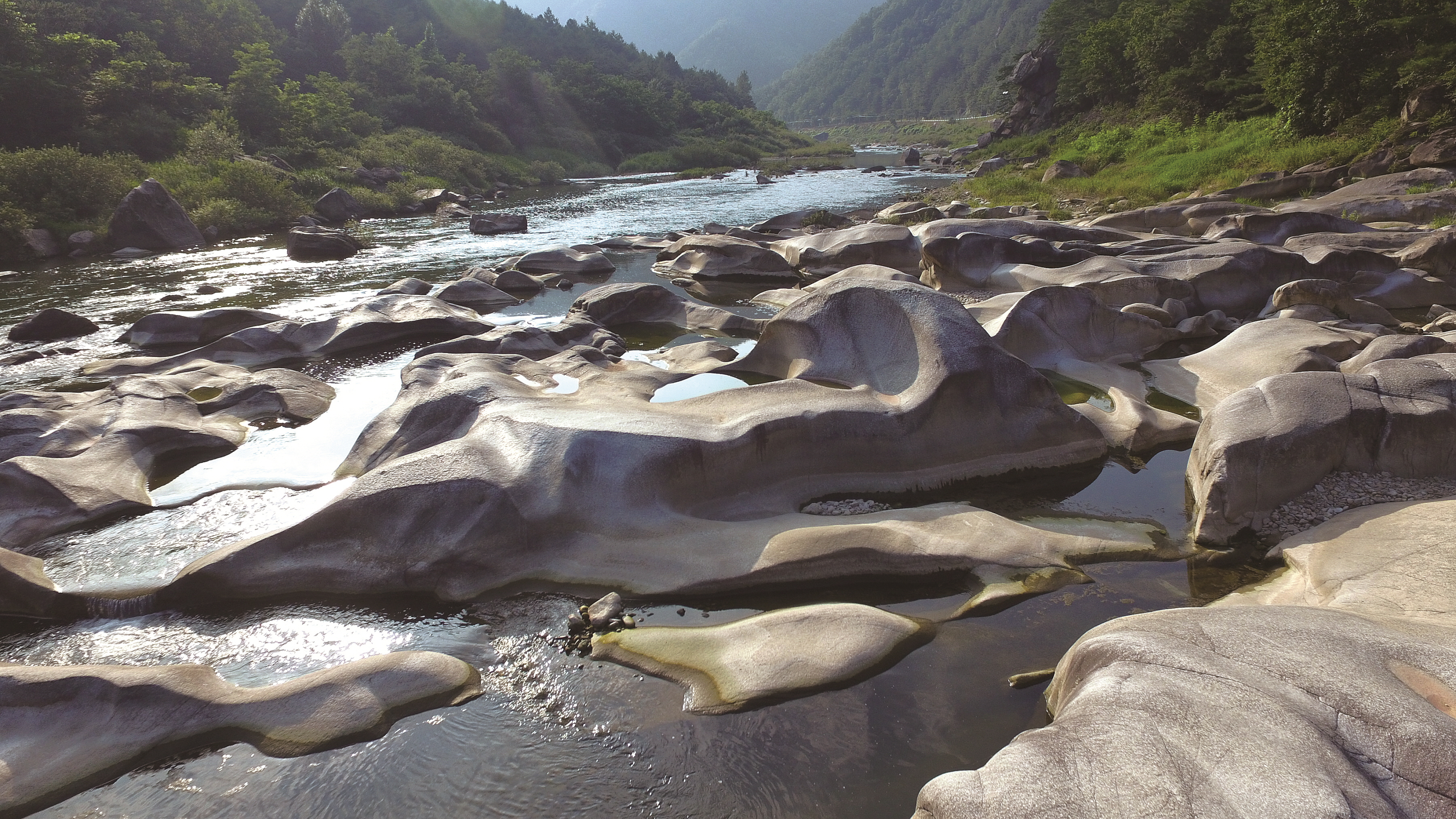
Potholes on Yoseonam in Mureung-ri

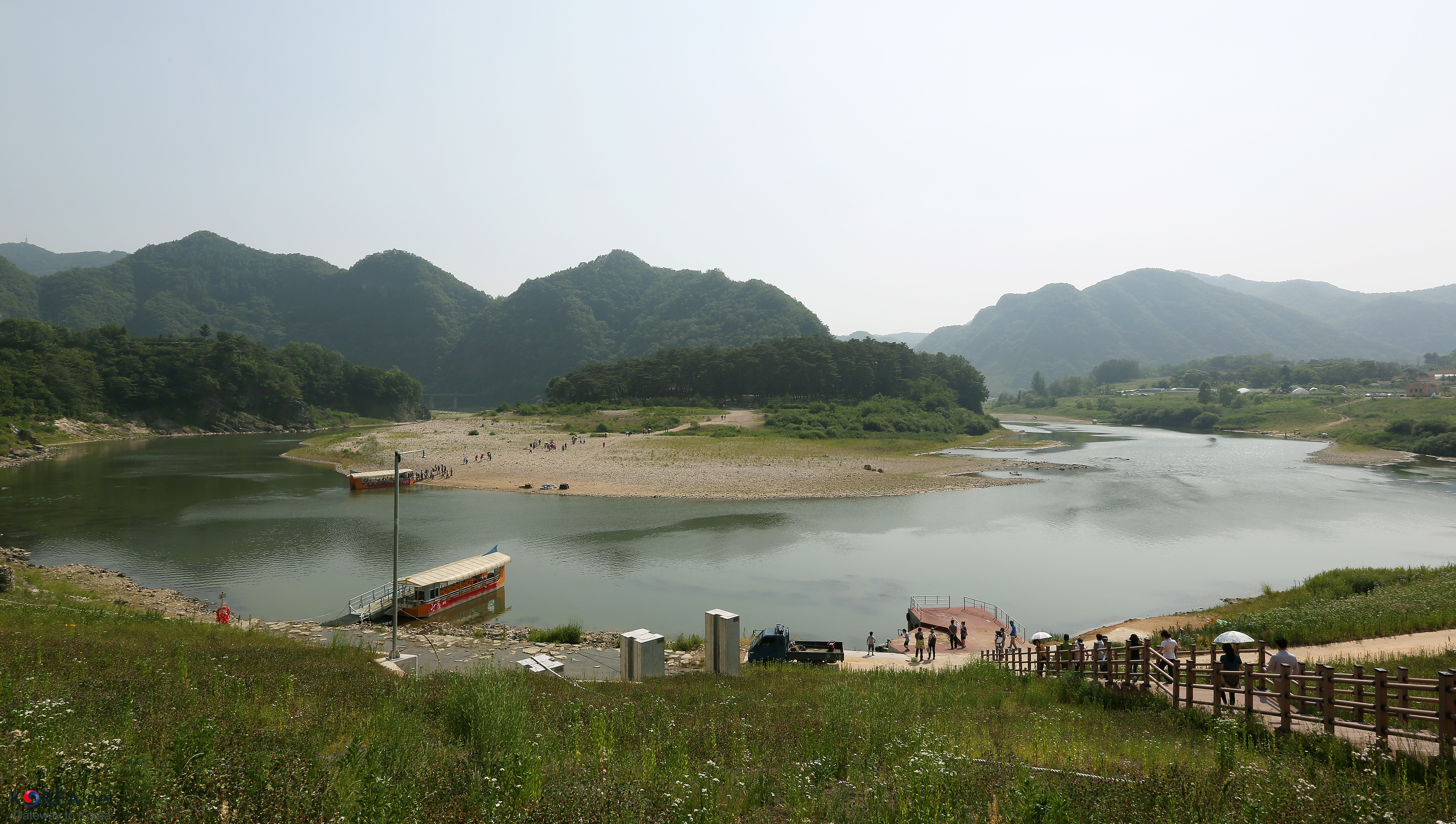
Cheongnyeongpo

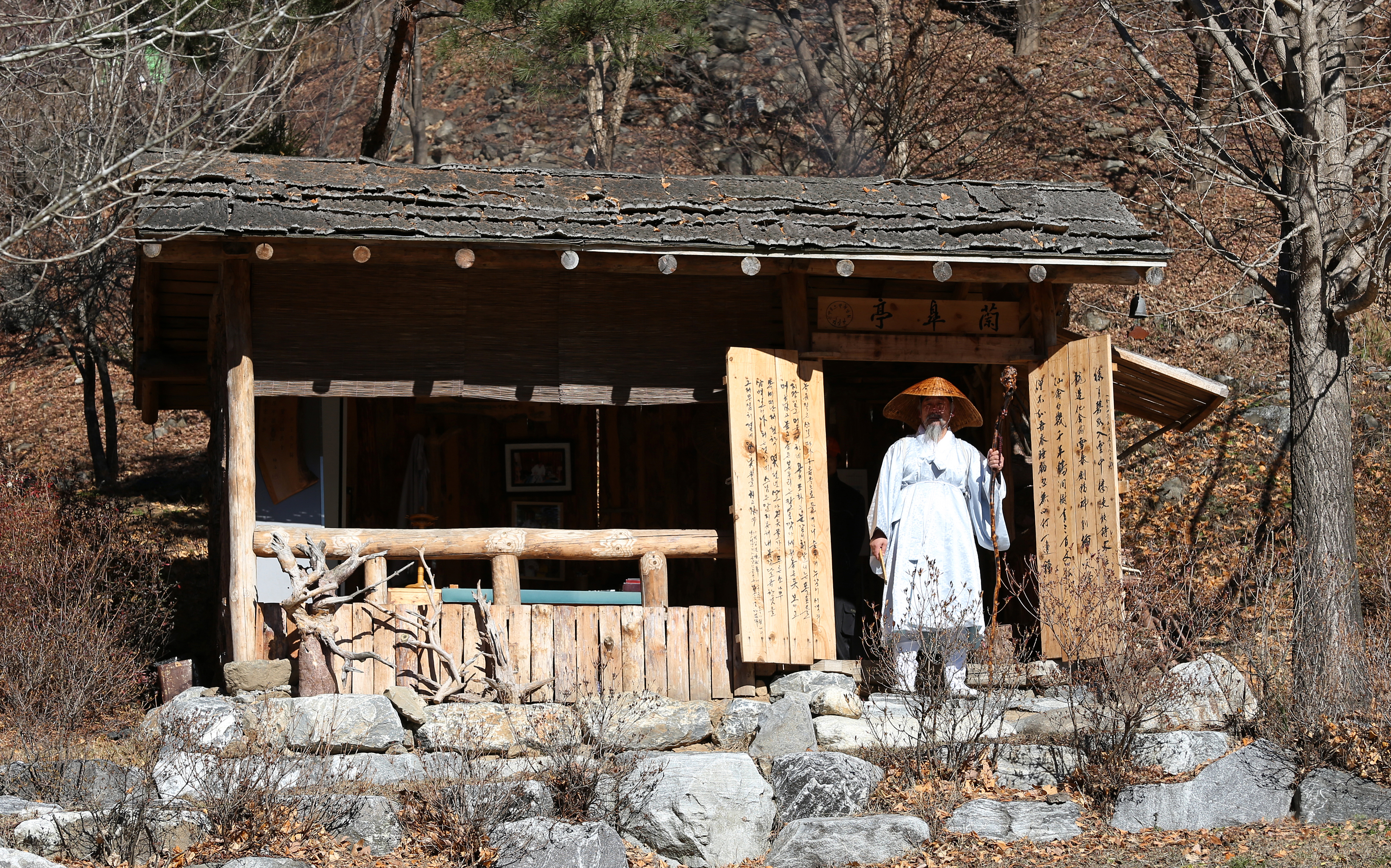
Kim Satgat Historic Site
