= Queen Inseong =

Queen of Joseon from 1544 to 1545

Queen Dowager of Joseon
- Tenure: 7 August 1545 – 16 January 1578
- Predecessor: Queen Dowager Yun
- Successor: Queen Dowager Soseong
- With: Queen Dowager Uiseong (from 1567 to 1575)

Queen Consort of Joseon
- Tenure: 9 December 1544 – 17 August 1545
- Predecessor: Queen Munjeong
- Successor: Queen Insun

Crown Princess of Joseon
- Tenure: 19 April 1524 – 9 December 1544
- Investiture: Geunjeongjeon, Gyeongbokgung
- Predecessor: Crown Princess Shin
- Successor: Crown Princess Yun
- Born: 28 October 1514; Hanseong, Joseon
- Died: 16 January 1578 (aged 63); Gyotaejeon, Gyeongbokgung, Hanseong, Joseon
- Burial: Hyoneung, Seosamneung Cluster, Goyang, South Korea
- Spouse: King Injong (m. 1524; died 1545)
Regnal name
- Gongui (공의; 恭懿) (Note: Known as honorific name (존호; 尊號) in the Sinosphere, its closest equivalent in the English-speaking world is the regnal name.)
Posthumous name
- Queen Hyosun Inseong (효순인성왕후; 孝順仁聖王后)
- House: Bannam Park (by birth); Jeonju Yi (by marriage)
- Dynasty: Yi
- Father: Park Yong, Internal Prince Geumseong
- Mother: Internal Princess Consort Munso, of the Uiseong Kim clan

Korean name
- Hangul: 인성왕후
- Hanja: 仁聖王后
- RR: Inseong wanghu
- MR: Insŏng wanghu

Queen Inseong (Korean: 인성왕후; Hanja: 仁聖王后; 28 October 1514 – 16 January 1578), of the Bannam Park clan, was the wife of King Injong, the 12th monarch of Joseon. She was queen of Joseon from 1544 until her husband's death in 1545, and was then styled as Queen Dowager Gongui during the reign of her brother-in-law, King Myeongjong, and that of her nephew-in-law, King Seonjo.

== Biography ==
=== Early life and lineage ===
The future Queen Inseong was born during the reign of King Jungjong, as the eldest and only legitimate child among two sons and two daughters. Her father was Park Yong (박용) and her mother was his second wife, a lady from the Uiseong Kim clan clan (의성 김씨).

Her natal Bannam Park clan was a prestigious aristocratic family and they would soon produce their second queen, Queen Uiin. Via Park Un (박은), the two queens were third cousins twice removed.

=== Life in the palace ===
In 1524, more than six months before her 10th birthday, Lady Park married 9-year-old Yi Ho, the son of King Jungjong and the late Queen Janggyeong, and was invested as crown princess. The marriage produced no children.

In 1544, her husband (posthumously King Injong) acceded to the throne and she became queen. Her tenure was short, as Injong died under mysterious circumstances just eight months later. The throne then passed to Injong's younger half-brother, Yi Hwan (posthumously King Myeongjong), and Lady Park was elevated to the position or queen dowager, receiving the honorific name Gongui (공의; lit. ''courteous and exemplary'').

=== Death ===
Lady Park died at the age of 63, having survived her husband by 32 years. She was buried alongside him within Hyoreung (효릉), today part of the Seosamneung Cluster in Goyang, Gyeonggi Province.

Prior to her death, she succeeded in persuading King Seonjo to remove the titles of the meritorious subjects of the Fourth Literati Purge and exonerate Yun Im and Prince Gyerim (계림군).

== Titles ==
- During the reign of King Jungjong (r. 1506–1544):
  - Lady, of the Bannam Park clan (반남 박씨; 潘南朴氏; from 28 October 1514)
    - Park Yong's daughter (박용의 딸)
    - Lady Park (박씨; 朴氏)
  - Crown Princess (왕세제빈; 王世弟嬪; from 19 April 1524)
- During the reign of King Injong (r. 1544–1545):
  - Queen (왕비; 王妃; from 9 December 1544)
- During the reign of King Myeongjong (r. 1545–1567):
  - Queen Dowager Gongui (공의왕대비; 恭懿王大妃; from 7 August 1545)
- During the reign of King Seonjo (r. 1567–1608):
  - Queen Inseong (인성왕후; 仁聖王后; from 1578)

== Family ==
- Father: Park Yong (박용), Internal Prince Geumseong (금성부원군; 1468–1524)
- Stepmother: Lady, of the Gwangju Kim clan (광주 김씨) (Note: Park Yong's first wife; daughter of Kim Geo (김거).)
- Mother: Internal Princess Consort Munso (문소부부인), of the Uiseong Kim clan (의성 김씨; 1490–1550)
- Sibling(s)
  - Park Chun-jeong (박춘정) (Note: Half-sibling of concubine birth.)
  - Park Pyeong (박평)
  - Lady, of the Bannam Park clan (반남 박씨) (Note: Married Yi Jang (이장), Eunseong Buryeong (은성부령); great-grandson of King Sejo. They had issue (1 son, 6 daughters). [Lineage: King Sejo → Prince Deokwon (덕원군; 1449–1498) → Deokseong Su (덕성수) → Eunseong Buryeong])
  - Park Gan (박간) (Note: Adopted brother; biological son of Park Yong's elder brother, Park Gi (박기).)
- Husband: King Injong (인종대왕; 20 March 1515 – 17 August 1545) — No issue.
  - Father-in-law: King Jungjong (중종대왕; 25 April 1488 – 9 December 1544)
  - Mother-in-law: Queen Janggyeong (장경왕후), of the Papyeong Yun clan (파평 윤씨; 19 August 1491 – 26 March 1515)
  - Stepmother-in-law: Queen Munjeong (문정왕후), of the Papyeong Yun clan (파평 윤씨; 12 December 1501 – 15 May 1565)

== Ancestry ==
Ancestors of Queen Inseong

Park Un (박은)
Park Gang (박강)
Lady, of the Jangheung Ju clan (장흥 주씨)
Park Chi (박치)
An Sung-jik (안숭직)
Lady, of the Sunheung An clan (순흥 안씨)
Park Yong, Internal Prince Geumseong (금성부원군 박용)
Seong Hyo-won (성효원)
Lady, of the Changnyeong Seong clan (창녕 성씨)
Queen Inseong
Kim Suk-on (김숙온)
Kim Yang-jung (김양중)
Lady, of the Park clan (박씨)
Kim Ik-gyeom (김익겸)
Lady, of the Yeoheung Min clan (여흥 민씨)
Internal Princess Consort Munso, of the Uiseong Kim clan (문소부부인 의성 김씨)

== In popular culture ==
- Portrayed by Nam Jeong-im in the 1967 film The Queen Moonjung.
- Portrayed by Chae Yu-mi in the 1985 MBC TV series 500 Years of Joseon: The Wind Orchid.
- Portrayed by Shin Eun-jung in the 2001–2002 SBS TV series Ladies of the Palace.

== See also ==
- History of Korea
- Styles and titles in Joseon
- Political factions of Joseon

== Notes ==
Queen Inseong Bannam Park clan
Royal titles
Preceded by Queen Munjeong of the Papyeong Yun clan	Queen Consort of Joseon; 1544–1545	Succeeded by Queen Insun of the Cheongsong Shim clan
Preceded by Queen Dowager Yun of the Papyeong Yun clan	Queen Dowager of Joseon; 1545–1578 with Queen Dowager Uiseong from 1567 to 1575	Succeeded by Queen Dowager Soseong of the Yonan Kim clan
