= Huibin Hong =

Korean royal consort (1494–1581)

- Royal Consort of the Senior First Rank
- Born: 27 May 1494; Joseon
- Died: 11 December 1581 (aged 87); Joseon
- Burial: Pocheon, South Korea
- Consort of: King Jungjong
- Issue Detail: 5 sons
- Clan: Namyang Hong (by birth); Jeonju Yi (by marriage)
- Dynasty: Yi
- Father: Hong Gyeong-ju
- Mother: Lady, of the Andong Gwon clan

Korean name
- Hangul: 희빈 홍씨
- Hanja: 熙嬪 洪氏
- RR: Huibin Hongssi
- MR: Hŭibin Hongssi

Huibin Hong (Korean: 희빈 홍씨; Hanja: 熙嬪 洪氏; 27 May 1494 – 11 December 1581), or Concubine Hui, (Note: The literal translation of bin (빈; 嬪) is "concubine". Combined with the honorific title hui (희; 熙), the full meaning is "Splendid Concubine".) of the Namyang Hong clan, was a consort of King Jungjong, the 11th monarch of Joseon.

== Biography ==
=== Early life and lineage ===
Lady Hong was born during the reign of King Seongjong, as the youngest child among one son and two daughters. Her father was Hong Gyeong-ju (홍경주) and her mother was a lady from the Andong Gwon clan (안동 권씨).

=== As royal consort ===
In 1506, a coup d'état orchestrated by Park Won-jong, Seong Hui-an, Ryu Sun-jong and Hong Gyeong-ju deposed the tyrannical Yeonsangun and enthroned Grand Prince Jinseong (posthumously King Jungjong). Hong Gyeong-ju thus became a meritorious subject and powerful official of the new administration, while his 12-year-old daughter was appointed as a royal consort of the junior second rank (숙의; sugui). She was subsequently promoted to the senior second rank (소의; soui) and junior first rank (귀인; gwiin), before finally reaching the senior first rank in 1537 and receiving the honorific title hui (熙), meaning "splendid".

In the palace, Lady Hong gained King Jungjong's favor and became a solid political base for her father, and under his guidance, she played a key role in the suppression of the emergent Sarim faction and the elimination of Jo Gwang-jo.

She gave birth to a total of five sons, but only Prince Geumwon (금원군) and Prince Bongseong (봉성군) survived infancy.

=== Later life and death ===
After the sudden death of King Injong in 1445, Lady Hong was implicated in Yun Yeo-hae and Yun Hui-ryeong's treason case (윤여해·윤희령 모반사건), but the charges were ultimately dismissed out of consideration for the late king's favor toward her. Prince Bongseong was also implicated in the Fourth Literati Purge and Yangjae Station Wall Inscription Incident, and ultimately forced to commit suicide in 1547.

Lady Hong died at the age of 87, having survived her former rival, Queen Munjeong, as well as King Jungjong and 25 of his 27 children — including her own sons, and Jungjong's legitimate sons and successors, King Injong and King Myeongjong. She was buried in present-day Pocheon, Gyeonggi Province.

Among the Joseon royal consorts whose birth and death dates are confirmed, Lady Hong is the longest-lived, followed by Sugui Yun (숙의 윤씨), a consort of Yeonsangun.

== Titles ==
- During the reign of King Seongjong (r. 1470–1495):
  - Lady, of the Namyang Hong clan (남양 홍씨; 南陽洪氏; from 27 May 1494)
    - Hong Gyeong-ju's daughter (홍경주의 딸)
    - Lady Hong (홍씨; 洪氏)
- During the reign of King Jungjong (r. 1506–1544):
  - Sugui (Note: lit. ''Lady of Warm Deportment'') (숙의; 淑儀; from 1506), royal consort of the junior second rank
  - Soui (Note: lit. ''Lady of Bright Deportment'') (소의; 昭儀; from 1517), royal consort of the senior second rank
  - Gwiin (Note: lit. ''Noble Lady'') (귀인; 貴人; from 1519), royal consort of the junior first rank
  - Concubine Hui (희빈; 熙嬪; from 1537), royal consort of the senior first rank

== Family ==
- Father: Hong Gyeong-ju (홍경주; ?–1521)
- Mother: Lady, of the Andong Gwon clan (안동 권씨)
- Sibling(s)
  - Hong U-ryong (홍우룡) (Note: ▪︎Wife: Lady, of a certain clan (모씨). ▪︎Issue: at least three sons.)
  - Lady, of the Namyang Hong clan (남양 홍씨) (Note: Married Kim Myeong-yun (김명윤), Prince Gwangpyeong (광평군; 1493–1572) from the Gwangsan Kim clan (광산 김씨). They had issue (3 sons, 1 daughter).)
- Consort of: King Jungjong (중종대왕; 25 April 1488 – 9 December 1544)
- Issue
  - Yi Yeong (이영), Prince Geumwon (금원군; 21 July 1513 – 19 May 1562) (Note: ▪︎Wife: Princess Consort Pajing (파징군부인), of the Haeju Jeong clan (해주 정씨; 1513–1560); daughter of Jeong Seung-hyu (정승휴; 1488–1534) and adopted great-granddaughter of Princess Gyeonghye. ▪︎Issue: 1 adopted son, 1 daughter.)
  - Yi Wan (이완), Prince Bongseong (봉성군; 7 May 1528 – 17 November 1547) (Note: ▪︎Wife: Princess Consort (군부인), of the Dongnae Jeong clan (동래 정씨); daughter of Jeong Yu-in (정유인). ▪︎Issue: 1 adopted son, 1 daughter.)
  - Unnamed son
  - Unnamed son
  - Unnamed son

== Ancestry ==
Ancestors of Huibin Hong

Hong Cheok (홍척)
Hong Jeong (홍정)
Lady, of the Yonan Kim clan (연안 김씨)
Hong Im (홍임)
Park Nul-saeng (박눌생)
Lady, of the Miryang Park clan (밀양 박씨)
Lady, of the Yangcheon Heo clan (양천 허씨)
Hong Gyeong-ju (홍경주)
Heo Bi (허비)
Heo Son (허손)
Lady, of the Jeonui Yi clan (전의 이씨)
Lady, of the Yangcheon Heo clan (양천 허씨)
Choe An-seon (최안선)
Lady, of the Hwasun Choe clan (화순 최씨)
Lady, of the Suseong Na clan (수성 나씨)
Concubine Hui
Gwon Chon (권촌)
Gwon Gye-u (권계우)
Gwon Geum-seong (권금성)
Yun Pan (윤판)
Lady, of the Musong Yun clan (무송 윤씨)
Lady, of the Jinju Kang clan (진주 강씨)
Lady, of the Andong Gwon clan (안동 권씨)
Jeong Heung-in (정흥인)
Jeong In-ji (정인지)
Lady, of the Heungdeok Jin clan (흥덕 진씨)
Lady, of the Hadong Jeong clan (하동 정씨)
Yi Hyu (이휴)
Lady, of the Gyeongju Yi clan (경주 이씨)

== In popular culture ==
- Portrayed by Lee Jae-eun in the 1996 KBS2 TV series Jo Gwang Jo.
- Portrayed by Kim Min-hee in the 2001–2002 SBS TV series Ladies of the Palace.

== See also ==
- History of Korea
- Styles and titles in Joseon
- Consort kin
- Jungjong Restoration
