= Yi Chibang =

- Hangul: 이지방
- Hanja: 李之芳
- RR: I Jibang
- MR: I Chibang

General Yi Chibang (Korean: 이지방; Hanja: 李之芳, 15 October 1466 – 11 December 1537) was a soldier and military officer of the Korean Joseon dynasty. He was appointed governor of Chongsung, in what is now Hoeryong, Uiju County, North Korea.

During King Yeonsangun's reign and the early part of King Jungjong of Joseon's reign, Yi Chibang served as a guard along the border of the northern part of Korea. He served as Sugun Jeoldosa of Gyeongsang-jwado and Byeongma Jeoldosa of Pyongan Province. "Jeoldosa" was a term for military commanders. He was also a dispatch diplomat for China's Ming dynasty.

== Life ==
=== Early life ===
In 1490 and 1492, Chibang participated in expulsion operations and battles against the Jurchen people in Hamgyongbuk-do and Pyeonganbuk-do. His position was senior adjutant of commander of Bukjeong. (Note: Bukjeong was a conquest or suppression of northern thief and nomadic tribes / horse-riding peoples.) In 1493, he was appointed commander of Seojeong alongside Yi Won-jong (이원종;李元宗), Chang Chung (장정;張珽), and Yi Yun-jong (이윤종;李允宗).

Afterward, he was appointed county governor of Cheongsung (종성;鐘城) and Hoeryong (회령;會寧). One of his close relatives was a eunuch of unknown name who was a bureaucrat (내시;內侍) of a government official (Note: The office was called "Naesi", which was an assignment for secretary, palace mayor of Korean Joseon dynasties, but that possibility was all male eunuchs.) and had inside information about King Yeonsangun. He was anxious, and mass dismissal of high-ranking government officials and eunuch bureaucrats occurred.

In January 1509, Chibang's mother died. He took a long leave of absence from public office to attend his mother's funeral and as a mourning period. But during this period, he committed a wrangling and beating murder of a male civilian. He was met with harsh criticism, in the devout action funeral time of his mother than the murder of male civilians. He was expelled and put in the prison of Uigeumbu (의금부;義禁府) (Note: Its meaning is national police office of Joseon dynasty.) for the crime of in devout action of funeral time and killing civilians was funeral time of his mother.

Sometime later, Chibang was released by order of King Jungjong of Joseon, though he was met with a great deal of criticism by mass media organizations because of violation of the doctrine of Neo-Confucianism. He was eventually reappointed county governor of Heoryong. In March 1513, he was appointed county governor of Uiju (의주;義州). In 1516, he was appointed Sugun Jeoldosa of Gyoengsangjwa-do, the naval forces commander of Gyoengsangjwa-do. (Note: The western part of the province of Gyeongsang-do in Korea.)

=== Later life ===
In 1517, King Jungjong was remarried to Lady Moonjung Yun of Papyong, later Queen Munjeong. Queen Janggyeong of Joseon had died due to sickness after parturition in 1515. Yi Chibang was appointed to Chaekbong Jucheongsa (책봉주청사;冊封奏請使), envoy suggestion for installation of the Queen. He was dispatched to Beijing in the Ming dynasty. The Joseon was volunteer for dependency China's Ming dynasty, so Joseon was King and Queen, Crown prince was appointed unto Ming dynasty.

In 1524, he was appointed Byeongma Jeoldosa of Pyeongan-do, the army commander of Pyeongan-do province. He made a recommendation to the government for the expulsion of nomadic horse-riding peoples in three border areas of the northern region, but he was attacked by Saheonbu and Saganwon; he was discharged and in lumbers in Uigeumbu. That year he was reinstated as army commander of the province of Pyeongan-do.

In 1528, upon the death of Empress Xiaojiesu of the Ming dynasty, Chibang was appointed Jinhyangsa (진향사;進香使), vice leader of the Government delegation of condolence of the Korean Joseon. He was dispatched to the Ming dynasty but on the way he fell sick and returned to the border area. He was sharply criticized for suddenly returning to the border area. He was expelled and in lumber of Uigeumbu. Next, he was exiled in Nampo in South Hwanghae Province.

Yi Chibang emerged from exile due to dysentery and a disease characterized by thirst, possibly diabetes. He wanted to quit. In 1531, he was appointed Byeongma Jeoldosa of Chungcheong Province, but he was not incoming because of his illness.

Yi Chibang died in 1537. He was buried at Eonju town, Gwangju, in Gyeonggi Province. In the 20th century his gravesite was incorporated into the city of Seongnam, and is currently located in Daejang-dong, Bundang District, Seongnam.

== See also ==
- History of Korea
- Naval history of Korea
- Jungjong of Joseon
