= Princess Hyohye =

Joseon princess (1511–1531)

Princess Hyohye 효혜공주
- Princess of Joseon
- Born: Yi Ok-ha; 13 June 1511; Hanseong, Joseon
- Died: 6 May 1531 (aged 19); Hanseong, Joseon
- Spouse: Kim Hui, Prince Consort Yeonseong (m. 1521–1531)
- Issue: Lady Kim Seon-ok of the Yonan Kim clan
- House: Jeonju Yi clan
- Father: Jungjong of Joseon
- Mother: Queen Janggyeong of the Papyeong Yun clan

Princess Hyohye (Korean: 효혜공주; Hanja: 孝惠公主; RR: Hyohye Gongju; 13 June 1511 – 6 May 1531), born Yi Ok-ha (이옥하; 李玉荷), was a Joseon Dynasty princess as the daughter of King Jungjong and Queen Janggyeong. She was the older sister of Injong of Joseon.

== Biography ==
=== Early life ===
Yi Ok-ha was born on 13 June 1511, as the eldest child and only daughter of King Jungjong and Queen Janggyeong. It was said that she was affectionately doted on by her father.

At the age of 4, she lost her mother to postpartum sickness after the birth of her younger brother, Crown Prince Yi Ho, on March 10, 1515. After her mother's death, the Princess was raised by her maternal aunt, Princess Consort Paepyeong, wife of Yi Yi, Prince Deokpung, and by Royal Consort Gwi-in of the Uiryeong Nam clan, one of King Seongjong's concubines. But before Queen Janggyeong died, she entrusted her sister, Princess Consort Paepyeong, Princess Hyohye's property. Saying that once the young princess became an adult, the princess consort should give it to her daughter.

In 1517, her father remarried, and Queen Munjeong became her step-mother. She had five younger half-siblings, which included the future King Myeongjong.

When her aunt Princess Consort Paepyeong was on her deathbed, she distributed some of Princess Hyohye's property to her own son, Yi Yi, Prince Gyerim, and the rest to the princess. But the princess was dissatisfied with the distribution of her inherited property, and later complained to Queen Munjeong. This prompted Queen Munjeong to summon Prince Gyerim and rebuked him.

Prince Gyerim was hated by Queen Munjeong and was eventually executed in 1545 for being involved in Eulsasahwa.

=== Marriage ===
On December 14, 1520, there was a selection for the husband of the Princess (buma gantaek; 부마 간택; Prince Consort selection), and Kim Hui, son of Kim Allo, from the Yonan Kim clan was selected and was later honoured as Prince Consort Yeonseong (연성위; 延城尉). They were married in November 1521.

=== Later life ===
In 1528, when she was 17 years old, she suffered from dysentery and was concerned about this and focused on getting treatment.

On May 6, 1531, at the age of 19, Princess Hyohye gave birth to a daughter, named Kim Seon-ok, but she died not long after due to her postpartum illness. Her husband also died later that same year in October. It is said that the country was in silence for three days after hearing the news of the Princess' death. It is unknown as to who took care or what happened to the orphaned daughter of the Princess after the couple died.

She is buried on a hill left from Grand Prince Wolsan's tomb, in Goyang, South Korea.

=== Aftermath ===
Her younger brother, King Injong, died of unknown causes, after ruling for 9 months.

In an unofficial chronicle it is said that when Injong went to pay his morning respects, Queen Munjeong's face started radiating with a smile only a mother could give to her child. Injong took it as a sign that the Queen Dowager was finally acknowledging him as the King, and in particular as her own son. He ate the ddeok that his step-mother gave him, not knowing that it would be the beginning of the end. He fell ill slowly, not enough to create any suspicion, but quickly enough that historians would later pick up on the event.

The daughter of the Princess, Kim Seon-ok, eventually married Yun Baek-won, the son of Yun Won-ro and nephew of Queen Munjeong. They had one daughter, Yun Gae-mi-chi, in 1555.

During Myeongjong's reign, Yun Baek-won joined Yi Ryang's faction and was later exiled after trying to get rid of the Sarim faction. However in 1565, Queen Munjeong ordered him to move to a nearby location, Geun-do, because he was Princess Hyohye's only son-in-law.

In 1589, Yun Baek-won died mysteriously during a meal with his daughter, his illegitimate son Yun Deok-yeong (윤덕경; 1558–1589), and concubine. Both siblings suspected each other of poisoning their father, but Yun Deok-yeong suddenly died after the meal as well.

This brought Yun Gae-mi-chi and her father's concubine, Bok-yi, to be interrogated but both soon died during the questioning due to the suspected poisoned meal they had.

Thirteen years later in 1602, Lady Yun's eldest son, Yi Sun (이순; 1576–1654), appealed to the government over his mother's death saying that it was an unfair one. It was later revealed that Yun Baek-won's brother, Yun Jo-won, was the culprit behind the poisoning of their father, and put the unexplained blame onto his children. It states that he had poisoned his brother due to the property he inherited as a Royal in-law and because Yun Baek-won was the head of the Papyeong Yun clan at the time. Thus wanting to inherit everything as he was next in line.

== Family ==
- Father - Yi Yeok, Jungjong of Joseon (조선 중종왕; 25 April 1488 – 9 December 1544)
- Mother - Queen Janggyeong of the Papyeong Yun clan (장경왕후 윤씨; 19 August 1491 – 26 March 1515)

Sibling

- Younger brother - Yi Ho, Injong of Joseon (20 March 1515 – 17 August 1545)
- Husband - Kim Hui, Prince Consort Yeonseong (김희 연성위; 金禧 延城尉; 1508 – October 1531)
- Issue
  - Daughter - Kim Seon-ok (김선옥; 金善玉), Lady Kim of the Yonan Kim clan (연안 김씨; 延安 金氏; 6 May 1531–?)
    - Son-in-law - Yun Baek-won (윤백원; 尹百源; 1528–1589); son of Yun Won-ro (윤원로; 尹元老) and nephew of Queen Munjeong
