= Kim Myŏngyun =

Korean scholar-official (fl. 16th century)

- Hangul: 김명윤
- Hanja: 金明胤
- RR: Gim Myeongyun
- MR: Kim Myŏngyun

Kim Myŏngyun (Korean: 김명윤; Hanja: 金明胤; fl. mid-16th century), was a scholar-official of the Joseon period who was involved in the fourth literati purge of 1545. The Eulsa purge took place following the accession of Myeongjong of Joseon, which brought a new in-law family to power. He was serving as the governor of Gyeonggi Province when Yun Wŏnhyŏng began to kill his enemies in the government, including Minister of Punishments Yun Im as well as Minister of Personnel Yu Insuk. Kim told Yun that Prince Gyerim and Prince Bongseong had been aware of the plots of these ministers, and thus brought about the death of Prince Gyerim.

== See also ==
- Joseon Dynasty politics
- List of Joseon Dynasty people
- Purges in the Joseon Dynasty
