= Taewon Jang clan =

Korean clan from Shaanxi, China

- Country: Korea
- Current region: Taiyuan
- Founder: Chang Mun han

The Taewon Jang clan (Korean: 태원 장씨; Hanja: 太原 張氏) is one of the Korean clans. Their Bon-gwan is in Taiyuan, Shanxi, China. Their founder was Jang Mun han who was a Jang Geun’s child. Jang Geun worked as Geochang Governor (居昌縣監) during the 21 th year of Myeongjong of Joseon’s reign in Joseon. The Taewon Jhang clan and Longxi Chang clan in China have the same roots. However, there have been no detailed historical documents yet, therefore it is not clear when the Taewon Jang clan came to Korea.

== See also ==
- Korean clan names of foreign origin
