= Princess Insun =

Korean Royal Princess

- Born: 1542; Joseon
- Died: 1545 (aged 2–3/4); Joseon
- Burial: Seosamneung, Goyang, Gyeonggi Province
- House: House of Yi
- Father: Yi Yeok, King Jungjong
- Mother: Queen Munjeong of the Papyeong Yun clan

Korean name
- Hangul: 인순공주
- Hanja: 仁順公主
- RR: Insun gongju
- MR: Insun kongju

Princess Insun (1542–1545) was a Joseon Royal Princess as the youngest daughter of King Jungjong and Queen Munjeong, also the youngest sister of King Myeongjong who died at very young age. Her tomb firstly located in Yangju, but later moved to Seosamneung at Goyang. Then, Jeongsu Temple (정수사; 淨水寺) was built for her and in 1564, although many Confucian students insisted on its abolition, her brother refused it with cited that it was her wondang.
