= Jungjong of Joseon =

King of Joseon from 1506 to 1544

Jungjong

King of Joseon
- Reign: 28 September 1506 – 9 December 1544
- Enthronement: Geunjeongjeon, Gyeongbokgung
- Predecessor: Yeonsangun
- Successor: Injong
- Born: 25 April 1488; Gyotaejeon, Gyeongbokgung, Hanseong, Joseon
- Died: 9 December 1544 (aged 56); Hwangyeongjeon, Changgyeonggung, Hanseong, Joseon
- Burial: Jeongneung, Seoul, South Korea
- Spouses: Queen Dangyeong (m. 1499; dep. 1506) Queen Janggyeong (m. 1507; died 1515) Queen Munjeong (m. 1517)
- Issue Detail: Injong of Joseon; Prince Deokheung; Myeongjong of Joseon
Names
- Yi Yeok (이역; 李懌)
Era dates
- Adopted the era name of the Ming dynasty (Note: Jeongdeok (Zhengde) (정덕; 正德): 1506–1521 Gajeong (Jiajing) (가정; 嘉靖): 1522–1544)
Posthumous name
- Joseon: Great King Gonghui Hwimun Somu Heumin Seonghyo (공희휘문소무흠인성효대왕; 恭僖徽文昭武欽仁誠孝大王); Ming dynasty: Gonghui (공희; 恭僖)
Temple name
- Jungjong (중종; 中宗)
- Clan: Jeonju Yi
- Dynasty: Yi
- Father: King Seongjong
- Mother: Queen Jeonghyeon
- Religion: Confucianism (Neo-Confucianism)

Korean name
- Hangul: 중종
- Hanja: 中宗
- Lit.: "Restoring Ancestor"
- RR: Jungjong
- MR: Chungjong

Royal title
- Hangul: 진성대군
- Hanja: 晉城大君
- RR: Jinseong daegun
- MR: Chinsŏng taegun

Courtesy name
- Hangul: 낙천
- Hanja: 樂天
- RR: Nakcheon
- MR: Nakch'ŏn

Jungjong (Korean: 중종; Hanja: 中宗; 25 April 1488 – 9 December 1544), (Note: In the Korean calendar (lunisolar), he was born on the 5th day of the third lunar month and died on the 15th day of the 11th lunar month.) personal name Yi Yeok, was the 11th monarch of Joseon. The eighth surviving son of King Seongjong, he acceded to the throne upon the deposition of his eldest half-brother, the tyrannical Yeonsangun.

== Biography ==
=== Rise to power ===
In September 1506, on the day Yeonsangun was deposed, soldiers belonging to the coup's leaders surrounded the house of Grand Prince Jinseong. He was about to commit suicide, thinking that his older half-brother was finally going to kill him, but after being dissuaded by his wife, Lady Shin (later known as Queen Dangyeong), Grand Prince Jinseong found himself becoming the eleventh king of Joseon, after the tenth king of Joseon, Yeonsangun of Joseon.

=== Cho Kwangjo's reforms ===
Jungjong worked hard to wipe out the remnants of Yeonsangun's era by reopening Sungkyunkwan (the royal university) and the Office of Censors (which criticizes inappropriate actions of the king). However, during the early days of his reign, the new king could not exert the royal power freely as those who put him on the throne held immense control over the country. When three of the main leaders of coup died of old age or natural causes in the next eight years, Jungjong began to assert his authority and carried out large-scale reforms with the help of Cho Kwangjo and other Sarim scholars, despite much opposition from conservative nobles who had participated in the 1506 rebellion.

Cho Kwangjo strengthened local autonomy by establishing a self-governing system called Hyangyak, promoted Confucian writings by translating them into hangul (Korean native script) and distributing them widely, pursued a land reform that would distribute land more equally between the rich and poor, and introduced a supplementary system to recruit talents for the government. He believed that any talented people, including slaves, should be appointed as officials regardless of social status. The Veritable Records of the Joseon Dynasty state that during his time as Inspector General (taesahŏn; 대사헌), he enforced the laws strictly so that no official dared to receive a bribe or exploit the local populace.

While Jungjong and Cho Kwangjo shared a common passion for the reformist agenda, the former was chiefly interested in solidifying royal authority whereas the latter was more concerned with neo-Confucian ideology, according to which those who rule must be a virtuous example to the rest. Jo's uncompromising character and frequent remonstrations also began to irritate the king.

In late 1519, the conservative officials came up with a plan to further weaken Cho Kwangjo's influence; they used honey to write Chu Ch'o Wi Wang ("Chu ch'o will be King"; 주초위왕, 走肖爲王) on mulberry leaves so that caterpillars would leave behind the same words as if in supernatural manifestation. When the hanja characters 走 (chu) and 肖 (ch'o) are put together, they form the character 趙 (cho), and the expression's meaning changes to "Cho [Gwang-jo] will be King". The incident was reminiscent of another occurrence that took place before the fall of the Goryeo dynasty, when the phrase Mok Cha Tŭk Kuk ("Son of wood will gain the country"; 목자득국, 木子得國) became popular. In this case, the combined characters 木 ("wood") and 子 ("son") form the character 李 ("yi"), which was the surname of General Yi Sŏnggye (later known as King Taejo, the founder of Joseon).

The only living leader of the 1506 coup, Hong Kyŏngju (홍경주; 洪景舟), used this event to heighten Jungjong's suspicions and fears. Finally, in January 1520, Cho Kwangjo was executed on charges of factionalism and many of his followers were exiled, while his radical reform programs were abruptly abandoned. The incident became known as the Third Literati Purge (Gimyo Sahwa; 기묘사화; 己卯士禍).

=== Rule of in-laws ===
After Cho Kwangjo's elimination, Jungjong never had the chance to rule on his own again. His reign was marked by tumultuous struggle among various conservative factions, each of them backed by one of the king's wives or concubines.

In 1524, Nam Kon and Sim Chŏng ousted the corrupt official Kim Allo, but he managed to return to power and took revenge by accusing Royal Noble Consort Gyeong (one of the king's concubines) of plotting against the crown prince, which led to her execution along with her only son, Prince Bokseong. Following this case, Kim Allo started using the protection of the crown prince as an excuse to begin a reign of terror against his enemies, and even attempted to depose Jungjong's third wife, Queen Munjeong, after she gave birth to a son (the future King Myeongjong). He eventually met his downfall at the hands of the queen's brothers, Yun Wŏllo and Yun Wŏnhyŏng. Despite these events, Yun Im, older brother of the late Queen Janggyeong and an ally of Kim Allo, was able to maintain his standing and preserve his nephew's position as heir to the throne.

The scholars and officials now gathered around two new centers of power and each group developed into separate political factions. Yun Im's party became known as "Greater Yun" and the Yun brothers' party as "Lesser Yun". Their conflict caused the Fourth Literati Purge (Ŭlsa Sahwa; 을사사화, 乙巳士禍) after Jungjong's death.

As the royal court was weakened by the continual internal conflict, foreign powers driven away by earlier monarchs returned with much greater effect. Japanese pirates often plundered the southern coastal regions, while the Jurchens attacked the northern frontier numerous times, bleeding the army dry.

=== Death ===
The king died on 9 December 1544 and was originally buried in Goyang, Gyeonggi Province. He was later moved to the Seonjeongneung Cluster, in Seoul, the burial ground of his parents, King Seongjong and Queen Jeonghyeon. The tomb is called Jeongneung (정릉).

The throne passed to his eldest legitimate son, Crown Prince Yi Ho (posthumously honored as King Injong), who died without issue less than a year later and was succeeded by his younger half-brother, Grand Prince Gyeongwon (today known as King Myeongjong).

== Family ==
- Father: King Seongjong (성종대왕; 28 August 1457 – 29 January 1494)
  - Biological grandfather: King Deokjong (덕종대왕; 12 October 1438 – 29 September 1457)
  - Adoptive grandfather: King Yejong (예종대왕; 23 January 1450 – 9 January 1470)
  - Biological grandmother: Queen Sohye (소혜왕후), of the Cheongju Han clan (청주 한씨; 16 October 1437 – 21 May 1504)
  - Adoptive grandmother: Queen Ansun (안순왕후), of the Cheongju Han clan (청주 한씨; 27 April 1445 – 12 February 1499)
- Mother: Queen Jeonghyeon (정현왕후), of the Papyeong Yun clan (파평 윤씨; 30 July 1462 – 23 September 1530)
  - Grandfather: Yun Ho (윤호), Internal Prince Yeongwon (영원부원군; 1424–1496)
  - Grandmother: Internal Princess Consort Yeonan (연안부부인), of the Damyang Jeon clan (담양 전씨; 1421–1500)

Consort(s) and their respective issue

- Queen Dangyeong (단경왕후), of the Geochang Shin clan (거창 신씨; 16 February 1487 – 6 January 1558)
- Queen Janggyeong (장경왕후), of the Papyeong Yun clan (파평 윤씨; 19 August 1491 – 26 March 1515)
  - Princess Hyohye (효혜공주; 23 June 1511 – 16 May 1531), given name Ok-ha (옥하), first daughter
  - Yi Ho (이호), King Injong (인종대왕; 20 March 1515 – 17 August 1545), fourth son
- Queen Munjeong (문정왕후), of the Papyeong Yun clan (파평 윤씨; 12 December 1501 – 15 May 1565)
  - Princess Uihye (의혜공주; 12 May 1521 – 1564), given name Ok-hye (옥혜), sixth daughter
  - Princess Hyosun (효순공주; 1522–1538), given name Ok-ryeon (옥련), seventh daughter
  - Unnamed child (1528–?) (Note: Uncertain gender; most likely female.)
  - Princess Gyeonghyeon (경현공주; 14 September 1530 – 16 September 1584), given name Ok-hyeon (옥현), 10th daughter
  - Yi Hwan (이환), King Myeongjong (명종대왕; 13 July 1534 – 12 August 1567), ninth son
  - Princess Insun (인순공주; 1542–1545), 11th daughter
- Concubine Gyeong (경빈), of the Miryang Park clan (밀양 박씨; 1492 – 25 June 1533)
  - Yi Mi (이미), Prince Bokseong (복성군; 7 November 1509 – 28 June 1533), first son
  - Princess Hyesun (혜순옹주; 22 February 1512 – 16 January 1584), given name Cheol-hwan (철환), second daughter
  - Princess Hyejeong (혜정공주; 6 November 1514 – 12 June 1580), given name Seok-hwan (석환), third daughter
- Concubine Hui (희빈), of the Namyang Hong clan (남양 홍씨; 27 May 1494 – 11 December 1581)
  - Yi Yeong (이영), Prince Geumwon (금원군; 21 July 1513 – 19 May 1562), third son
  - Yi Wan (이완), Prince Bongseong (봉성군; 7 May 1528 – 17 November 1547), seventh son
  - Unnamed son
  - Unnamed son
  - Unnamed son
- Concubine Chang (창빈), of the Ansan An clan (안산 안씨; 11 September 1499 – 17 November 1549)
  - Yi Geo (이거), Prince Yeongyang (영양군; 8 June 1521 – 16 September 1561), fifth son
  - Princess Jeongsin (정신옹주; 19 November 1526 – 19 May 1552), given name Seon-hwan (선환), ninth daughter
  - Unnamed son (Note: His childhood name was I-su (이수).)
  - Yi Cho (이초), Prince Deokheung (덕흥군; 2 April 1530 – 14 June 1559), eighth son
- Gwiin (귀인), of the Cheongju Han clan (청주 한씨; 1500–1575)
  - Unnamed son (1528)
- Sugui (숙의), of the Naju Na clan (나주 나씨; 1489 – 1 November 1514)
- Sugui (숙의), of the Gyeongju Yi clan (경주 이씨; ? – 5 November 1524)
  - Yi Gi (이기), Prince Deokyang (덕양군; 31 October 1524 – 22 July 1581), sixth son
- Sugui (숙의), of the Namyang Hong clan (남양 홍씨)
  - Yi Hui (이희), Prince Haean (해안군; 19 July 1511 – 9 August 1573), second son
- Sugui (숙의), of the Kim clan (김씨)
  - Princess Sukjeong (숙정옹주; 1525–1564), given name Su-hwan (수환), eighth daughter
- Sugwon (숙원), of the Daewon Yi clan (대원 이씨; ?–1520)
  - Princess Jeongsun (정순옹주; 27 January 1518 – 2 October 1581), given name Jeong-hwan (정환), fourth daughter
  - Princess Hyojeong (효정옹주; 18 December 1520 – 22 March 1544), given name Sun-hwan (순환), fifth daughter
- Unknown
  - Unnamed daughter (1516–?)

== Ancestry ==
Ancestors of Jungjong of Joseon

King Sejong (세종대왕)
King Sejo (세조대왕)
Queen Soheon, of the Cheongsong Shim clan (소헌왕후 청송 심씨)
King Deokjong (덕종대왕)
Yun Beon, Internal Prince Papyeong (파평부원군 윤번)
Queen Jeonghui, of the Papyeong Yun clan (정희왕후 파평 윤씨)
Internal Princess Consort Heungnyeong, of the Incheon Yi clan (흥녕부부인 인천 이씨)
King Seongjong (성종대왕)
Han Yeong-jeong (한영정)
Han Hwak, Internal Prince Seowon (서원부원군 한확)
Lady, of the Uiseong Kim clan (의성 김씨)
Queen Sohye, of the Cheongju Han clan (소혜왕후 청주 한씨)
Hong Yeo-bang, Duke Munyang (문양공 홍여방)
Internal Princess Consort Namyang, of the Namyang Hong clan (남양부부인 남양 홍씨)
Lady, of the Dongnae Jeong clan (동래 정씨)
King Jungjong
Yun Gon (윤곤)
Yun Sam-san (윤삼산)
Lady, of the Cheongju Han clan (청주 한씨)
Yun Ho, Internal Prince Yeongwon (영원부원군 윤호)
Yi Won (이원)
Lady, of the Goseong Yi clan (고성 이씨)
Lady, of the Jeonju Choe clan (전주 최씨)
Queen Jeonghyeon, of the Papyeong Yun clan (정현왕후 파평 윤씨)
Jeon Man-yong (전만용)
Jeon Jwa-myeong (전좌명)
Lady, of the Andong Gwon clan (안동 권씨)
Internal Princess Consort Yeonan, of the Damyang Jeon clan (연안부부인 담양 전씨)
Yi Bang (이방)
Lady, of the Jeonju Yi clan (전주 이씨)

== In popular culture ==
- Portrayed by Lee Gyung-yung in the 1988 film Diary of King Yeonsan.
- Portrayed by Choi Jong-hwan in the 2001–2002 SBS TV series Ladies of the Palace and in the 2017 SBS TV series Saimdang, Memoir of Colors.
- Portrayed by Im Ho in the 2003–2004 MBC TV series Jewel in the Palace.
- Portrayed by Park Chan-hwan in the 2006 KBS2 TV series Hwang Jini.
- Portrayed by Noh Young-hak in the 2007–2008 SBS TV series The King and I.
- Portrayed by Choi Il-hwa in the 2013 KBS2 TV series The Fugitive of Joseon.
- Portrayed by Ko Kyung-pyo in the 2015 film The Treacherous.
- Portrayed by Kim Beop-rae in the 2016 MBC TV series The Flower in Prison.
- Portrayed by Baek Seung-hwan and Yeon Woo-jin in the 2017 KBS2 TV series Queen for Seven Days.
- Portrayed by Park Hee-soon in the 2018 film Monstrum.

== See also ==
- History of Korea
- List of monarchs of Korea
- Styles and titles in Joseon

== Notes ==
Jungjong of Joseon House of Yi Born: 25 April 1488 Died: 9 December 1544
Royal titles
Preceded by Yeonsangun	King of Joseon; 28 September 1506 – 8 December 1544	Succeeded by Injong
