= Prince Yeongyang =

Korean prince (1521–1561)

Prince of Joseon
- Reign: ?–1561
- Predecessor: Prince Geumwon
- Successor: Prince Deokyang
- Born: Yi Geo; 29 May 1521; Joseon
- Died: 6 September 1561 (aged 40); Joseon
- Burial: Injwawon, Hurok Village, Sasi-ri, Jangdo-myeon, Jangdan-gun, Gyeonggi Province
- Spouse: An Bang-hyang, Princess Consort Gyeongyang of the Sunheung An clan
- Issue: Yi Su-jeon (adopted)
- House: House of Yi
- Father: Jungjong of Joseon
- Mother: Royal Noble Consort Chang of the Ansan An clan

Korean name
- Hangul: 이거
- Hanja: 李岠
- RR: I Geo
- MR: I Kŏ

Royal title
- Hangul: 영양군
- Hanja: 永陽君
- RR: Yeongyanggun
- MR: Yŏngyanggun

Courtesy name
- Hangul: 탁보
- Hanja: 卓甫
- RR: Takbo
- MR: T'akpo

Posthumous name
- Hangul: 성도
- Hanja: 成悼
- RR: Seongdo
- MR: Sŏngdo

Prince Yeongyang (Korean: 영양군; Hanja: 永陽君; 29 May 1521 – 6 September 1561 (Note: In the Korean calendar (lunar), he was born on 24th days 4th months 1521 and died on 27th day 7th month 1561.)), personal name Yi Geo (이거; 李岠) was a Royal Prince of the Joseon period as the 4th son of Yi Yeok, King Jungjong, from Royal Noble Consort Chang. He was the paternal uncle of the 14th monarch, Yi Yeon, King Seonjo. He was said to be gentle and humble. He was the founder of "Cadet branch of Prince Yeongyang of the Jeonju Yi clan" (전주이씨 영양군파).

According to Veritable Records of the Joseon Dynasty, it was recorded that he and his half older-sister, Princess Uihye decorated their private manor (close with Princess Hyojeong's manor) in a lavish manner and got criticized for it.

== Biography ==
=== Marriage and life ===
He later married the third daughter of An Se-hyeong (안세형) who served as the Left Chanseong of Joseon State Council (의정부 좌찬성; 議政府 左贊成). His wife was royally titled as Princess Consort Gyeongyang of the Sunheung Ahn clan (경양군부인 순흥 안씨).

However, since the two had no issue, they adopted Yi Su-jeon (이수전), a Heungnyeong Deputy Chief (흥녕부정; 興寧副正). Su-jeon was the biological son of Yi Seok-su (이석수) and the grandson of Yi Jong, Prince Musan (이종 무산군), who was the 12th son of Seongjong of Joseon. Biologically, Yi Su-jeon was a first cousin once removed of Prince Yeoyang as the latter was a grandson of King Seongjong. Since Su-jeon became Geo's son, he was given the royal title of "Prince Heungnyeong" (흥녕군).

Prince Yeongyang later died on 6 September 1561 at 40 years old during his younger half-brother’s, King Myeongjong, 16th year of reign and received his royal posthumous titles.

=== Tomb ===
His tomb was firstly located at Dongjak-ri, Gwacheon, Gyeonggi Province (now Dongjak-ri, Dongjak District, Seoul), right from his mother, but was moved to Injwawon (인좌원; 寅坐原), Hurok Village, Sasi-ri, Jangdo-myeon, Jangdan-gun, Gyeonggi Province on 26 February 1581 along with his wife, then his tombstone was erected in 1941 after the Korean Empire and South Korea was established.

His inscription was written by two different people: firstly, by Min Gyeong-sik (민경식; 閔景植) whom graduated in Hongmungwan University (홍문관대제학) and became the 2nd rank military officer of Hanseong-bu (한성부판윤; 漢城府判尹) and secondly, by Yi Beom-seok (이범석; 李範錫) who was graduated in Hongmungwan University too.

== Ancestry and family ==
=== Ancestors ===
Ancestors of Prince Yeongyang

Deokjong of Joseon 조선 덕종
Seongjong of Joseon 조선 성종
Queen Sohye 소혜왕후
Jungjong of Joseon 조선 중종
Yun Ho, Internal Prince Yeongwon 윤호 영원부원군
Queen Jeonghyeon 정현왕후
Internal Princess Consort Yeonan of the Damyang Jeon clan 연안부부인 담양 전씨
Yi Geo, Prince Yeongyang 이거 영양군
Mr. An 안씨
An Tan-dae 안탄대
Royal Noble Consort Chang of the Ansan An clan 창빈 안씨
Mr. Hwang 황씨
Lady Hwang of the Senior 1st rank 정경부인 황씨

- Father - Yi Yeok, King Jungjong of Joseon (조선 중종; 16 April 1488 – 29 November 1544)
- Mother - Royal Noble Consort Chang of the Ansan Ahn clan (창빈 안씨; 11 September 1499 – 17 November 1549)
- Siblings
  - Younger brother - Yi Su (이수; 1525–1526)
  - Younger sister - Yi Seon-hwan, Princess Jeongsin (정신옹주 이선환; 1526–1552)
  - Younger brother - Yi Cho, Grand Internal Prince Deokheung (덕흥대원군 이초; 2 April 1530 – 14 June 1559)
- Consort
  - Ahn Bang-hyang (안방향, 安芳香), Princess Consort Gyeongyang of the Sunheung Ahn clan (경양군부인 순흥 안씨; 10 August 1522 – 25 July 1594); third daughter of Ahn Se-hyeong (안세형; 1486–?)
- Issue
  - Adoptive son - Yi Su-jeon, Prince Heungnyeong (흥녕군 관직 부정 가덕 이수전; 14 December 1554 – 19 November 1605); second son of Yi Seok-su (이석수; 1524–1598)
