= Seonjeongneung =

Royal tomb in Seoul, South Korea

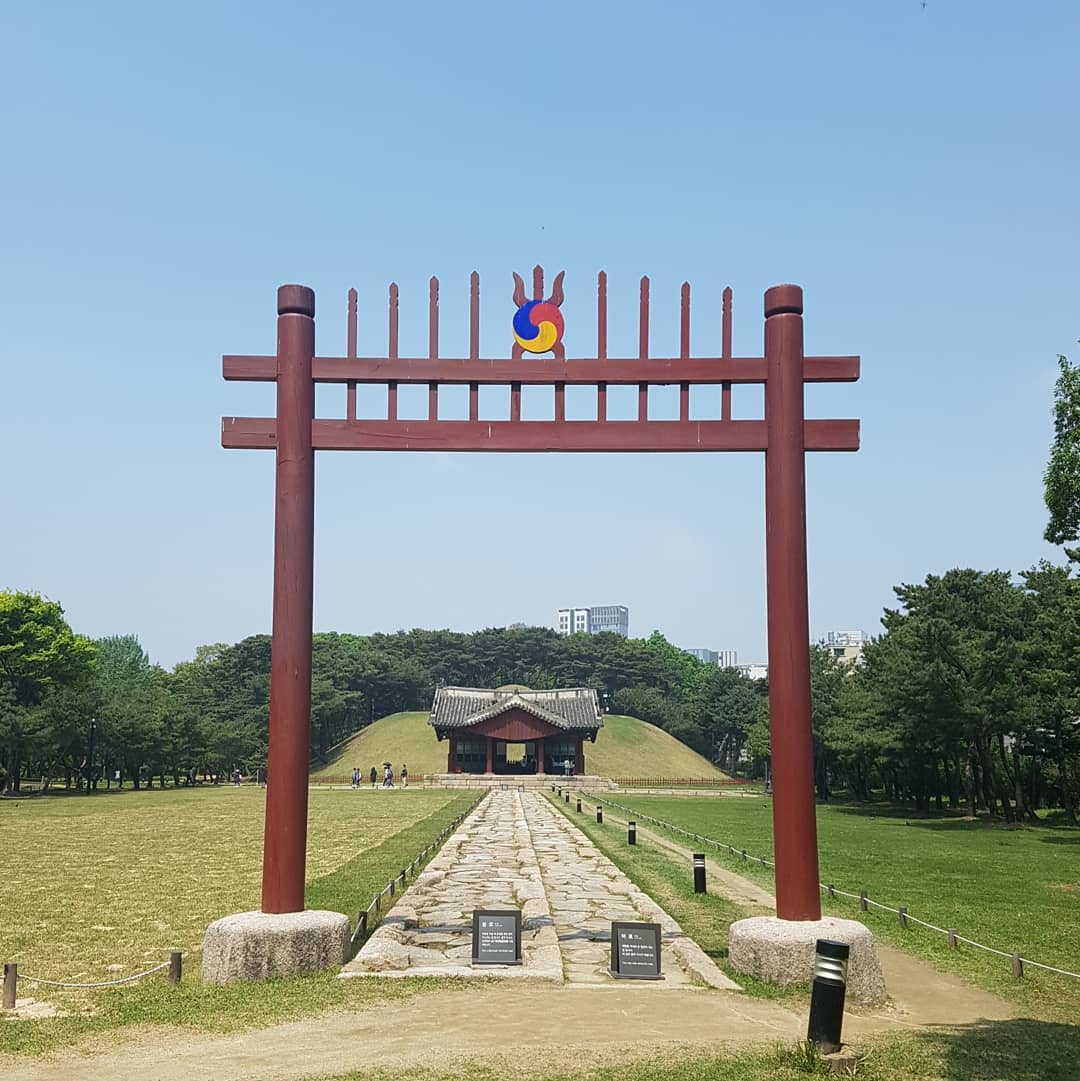
- Jeongneung
- Interactive map of Seonjeongneung
- 37°30′32″N 127°02′57″E
- Location: Seoul, South Korea

Site notes
- Governing body: Cultural Heritage Administration of Korea

UNESCO World Heritage Site
- Type: Cultural
- Criteria: iii, iv, vi
- Designated: 2009 (33rd session)
- Part of: Royal Tombs of the Joseon Dynasty
- Reference no.: 1319
- Region: Asia and Australasia

Historic Sites of South Korea
- Official name: Seolleung and Jeongneung Royal Tombs, Seoul
- Designated: 1970-05-26
- Reference no.: 199

Korean name
- Hangul: 선정릉
- Hanja: 宣靖陵
- RR: Seonjeongneung
- MR: Sŏnjŏngnŭng

Seonjeongneung (Korean: 선정릉; Hanja: 宣靖陵) is a burial ground from the Joseon dynasty, located in Seoul, South Korea. The westernmost tomb, called Seolleung, belongs to King Seongjong (1457–1494) the 9th monarch of Joseon. His first wife, Queen Gonghye of the Cheongju Han clan (1456–1474) died at age 18 and is buried near Munsan, north of Seoul. His third wife, Queen Jeonghyeon of the Papyeong Yun clan (1462–1530), is buried here because she gave birth to the future King Jungjong. Queen Jeonghyeon outlived Seongjong by 35 years and was buried in a splendid tomb to the east. Her grave has a stone fence encircling the mound, whereas her husband's tomb has a retaining wall. Statues of civilian and military officials and their horses stand at attention in front of the graves. South of the tombs is a single T-shaped shrine. There are also several auxiliary buildings for storing the materials used during commemorative ceremonies.

Queen Jeonghyeon had a deep interest in Buddhism and founded the nearby Bongeunsa Temple.

The other tomb is Jeongneung, located at the easternmost part of the site. This is the burial ground of King Jungjong (1487–1544), the 11th monarch of Joseon. He was the second son of Seongjong, and was originally buried in Goyang, near Munsan. However, his third wife, Queen Munjeong, thought it would be better to have him re-interred closer to his father. She expressed a wish to be buried alongside him, but this wish was never carried out, and his tomb stands alone.

== See also ==
- Seongjong of Joseon
- Jungjong of Joseon
