= The Fugitive of Joseon =

South Korean historical television series

- Promotional poster
- Also known as: Heaven's Will; Heaven's Order; Mandate of Heaven
- Hangul: 천명 : 조선판 도망자 이야기
- Hanja: 天命 : 朝鮮版逃亡者 이야기
- Lit.: Heaven's Order: The Story of the Fugitive from Joseon
- RR: Cheonmyeong : Joseonpan domangja iyagi
- MR: Ch'ŏnmyŏng : Chosŏnp'an tomangja iyagi
- Genre: Historical; Thriller; Mystery; Romance
- Written by: Choi Min-ki; Yoon Soo-jung
- Directed by: Lee Jin-seo; Jeon Woo-sung
- Starring: Lee Dong-wook; Song Ji-hyo; Kim Yoo-bin; Lim Seul-ong
- Composer: Nam Hye-seung
- Country of origin: South Korea
- Original language: Korean
- No. of episodes: 20

Production
- Executive producer: Moon Bo-hyeon
- Producer: Yoo Jong-seon
- Production location: Korea
- Cinematography: Kim Si-hyeong; Son Hyeong-shik
- Editor: Lee Dong-hyeon
- Running time: 60 minutes on Wednesdays and Thursdays at 21:55 (KST)
- Production companies: Celltrion Entertainment (formerly Dream E&M)

Original release
- Network: KBS2
- Release: 24 April – 27 June 2013

The Fugitive of Joseon (Korean: 천명 : 조선판 도망자 이야기; lit. 'Heaven's Order: The Story of the Fugitive from Joseon') is a 2013 South Korean historical television series starring Lee Dong-wook and Song Ji-hyo. It aired on KBS2 from April 24 to June 27, 2013 on Wednesdays and Thursdays at 21:55 for 20 episodes.

== Plot ==
Set during the reign of King Injong, the protagonist is a royal physician desperate to cure his ailing daughter. He becomes a fugitive when he gets entangled in an assassination plot to poison the crown prince, and fights to save both his daughter's life and his own.

== Cast ==
=== Main characters ===
- Lee Dong-wook as Choi Won

A royal physician and doting father turned fugitive who is out to clear his name and save his daughter.

- Song Ji-hyo as Hong Da-in

A royal nurse and Choi Won's assistant. She has a proud personality.

- Kim Yoo-bin as Choi Rang

Choi Won's daughter.

- Lim Seul-ong as Crown Prince Lee Ho

The son of King Jungjong, he lives day by day amid an uneasy life.

- Yoon Jin-yi as So Baek

Cheerful and tomboyish, she is the daughter of a bandit who ends up on the run with Choi Won.

- Park Ji-young as Queen Moon-jung
- Song Jong-ho as Lee Jung-hwan

As part of the uigeumbu (Joseon-era government bureau that investigated serious crimes), he is the best detective around and skilled with the sword.

- Kang Byul as Choi Woo-young

Choi Won's sister.

- Kwon Hyun-sang as Im Kkuk-jung

=== Supporting characters ===
- Jeon Guk-hwan as Minister Kim Chi-yong
- Lee Hee-do as Merchant Jang Hong-dal
- Sung Woong as Do-moon
- Seo Dong-hyun as Grand Prince Gyeongwon
- Choi Il-hwa as King Jungjong
- Kim Jung-kyun as Yun Won-hyung
- Kim Yoon-sung as Gon-oh
- Choi Phillip as Min Do-saeng
- Kim Mi-kyung as Jang-geum
- Lee Jae-yong as Chun-bong
- Lee Won-jong as Geo-chil
- Park Sun-woo as Gae Pal-son
- Jo Dal-hwan as Deok-pal
- Yoon Gi-won as Mak-bong
- Kim Hyung-beom as Pil-doo
- Jung Yoon-seon as Wol-ha
- Jang Yong-bok as Choi Chang-son
- Go In-beom as Choi Hyung-goo
- Yoo Chae-yeong as Geum-ok
- Yeom Dong-heon as common official naesi
- Kim Dong-jun as Mu Myeong

== Ratings ==
Episode #	Original broadcast date	Average audience share			
Episode #	Original broadcast date	TNmS Ratings (%)		AGB Nielsen (%)	
Episode #	Original broadcast date	Nationwide	Seoul National Capital Area	Nationwide	Seoul National Capital Area
1	24 April 2013	9.8%	10.1%	9.3%	9.8%
2	25 April 2013	9.9%	10.7%	8.9%	9.2%
3	1 May 2013	9.2%	9.8%	9.5%	10.1%
4	2 May 2013	9.9%	10.6%	9.9%	10.0%
5	8 May 2013	9.8%	9.6%	9.6%	10.2%
6	9 May 2013	9.3%	9.6%	9.4%	9.5%
7	15 May 2013	9.3%	9.9%	9.9%	10.2%
8	16 May 2013	9.5%	9.2%	8.7%	8.7%
9	22 May 2013	9.4%	10.0%	9.3%	9.8%
10	23 May 2013	9.8%	10.1%	9.0%	9.6%
11	29 May 2013	10.1%	10.5%	9.8%	10.1%
12	30 May 2013	9.3%	9.2%	8.7%	8.5%
13	5 June 2013	9.5%	9.6%	8.5%	8.3%
14	6 June 2013	7.9%	8.7%	9.3%	9.6%
15	12 June 2013	7.7%	7.5%	8.0%	8.0%
16	13 June 2013	7.9%	8.5%	8.5%	8.1%
17	19 June 2013	6.6%	7.5%	8.8%	9.0%
18	20 June 2013	7.4%	7.8%	8.9%	9.2%
19	26 June 2013	7.0%	7.4%	8.8%	9.1%
20	27 June 2013	8.5%	9.1%	9.6%	9.9%
Average		8.9%	-	9.1%	9.3%

== International broadcast ==
It aired in Japan on cable channel DATV. It aired in Thailand on PPTV beginning January 5, 2015. It aired in Indonesia on Indosiar beginning November 8, 2014. It aired in Iran on iribtv3HD beginning September 3, 2016.

== Awards and nominations ==
Year	Award	Category	Recipient	Result
2013	2013 KBS Drama Awards	Excellence Award, Actor in a Mid-length Drama	Lee Dong-wook	Nominated
2013	2013 KBS Drama Awards	Excellence Award, Actress in a Mid-length Drama	Song Ji-hyo	Nominated
2013	2013 KBS Drama Awards	Best New Actor	Im Seulong	Nominated
2013	2013 KBS Drama Awards	Best Young Actress	Kim Yoo-bin	Won
