= List of kings of Joseon =

The Joseon dynasty ruled Korea, succeeding the 400-year-old Goryeo dynasty in 1392 through the Japanese occupation in 1910. Twenty-seven kings ruled over united Korea for more than 500 years.

== List of kings ==
No.	Temple name	Portrait	Period of reign	Personal name	Reign name	Posthumous name	Refs
1	Taejo		1392–1398	Yi Seong-gye (이성계); Yi Dan (이단)		Great King Gangheon Seongmun Sinmu Jeongui Gwangdeok (강헌지인계운성문신무대왕); Emperor Go (고황제)	
2	Jeongjong		1398–1400	Yi Bang-gwa (이방과); Yi Gyeong (이경)		Great King Gongjeong Uimun Jangmu Onin Sunhyo (공정의문장무온인순효대왕)	
3	Taejong		1400–1418	Yi Bang-won (이방원)		Great King Gongjeong Seondeok Singong Munmu Gwanghyo (공정성덕신공문무광효대왕)	
4	Sejong		1418–1450	Yi Do (이도)		Great King Jangheon Yeongmun Yemu Inseong Myeonghyo (장헌영문예무인성명효대왕)	
5	Munjong		1450–1452	Yi Hyang (이향)		Great King Gongsun Heummyeong Insuk Gwangmun Seonghyo (공순흠명인숙광문성효대왕)	
6	Danjong		1452–1455	Yi Hong-wi (이홍위)		Great King Sunjeong Anjang Gyeongsun Donhyo (순정안장경순돈효대왕)	
7	Sejo		1455–1468	Yi Yu (이유)		Great King Hyejang Jideok Yunggong Seongsin Myeongye Heumsuk Inhyo (혜장지덕융공성신명예흠숙인효대왕)	
8	Yejong		1468–1469	Yi Gwang (이광)		Great King Yangdo Heummun Seongmu Uiin Sohyo (양도흠문성무의인소효대왕)	
9	Seongjong		1469–1494	Yi Hyeol (이혈)		Great King Gangjeong Inmun Heonmu Heumseong Gonghyo (강정인문헌무흠성공효대왕)	
10	Yeonsangun		1494–1506	Yi Yung (이융)		None	
11	Jungjong		1506–1544	Yi Yeok (이역)		Great King Gonghui Hwimun Somu Heumin Seonghyo (공희휘문소무흠인성효대왕)	
12	Injong		1544–1545	Yi Ho (이호)		Great King Yeongjeong Heonmun Uimu Jangsuk Heumhyo (영정헌문의무장숙흠효대왕)	
13	Myeongjong		1545–1567	Yi Hwan (이환)		Great King Gongheon Heonui Somun Gwangsuk Gyeonghyo (공헌헌의소문광숙경효대왕)	
14	Seonjo		1567–1608	Yi Gyun (이균); Yi Yeon (이연)		Great King Sogyeong Hyeonmun Uimu Seongye Dalhyo (소경현문의무성예달효대왕)	
15	Gwanghaegun		1608–1623	Yi Hon (이혼)		None	
16	Injo		1623–1649	Yi Jong (이종)		Great King Jangmok Heonmun Yeolmu Myeongsuk Sunhyo (장목헌문열무명숙순효대왕)	
17	Hyojong		1649–1659	Yi Ho (이호)		Great King Chungseon Seonmun Jangmu Sinseong Hyeonin Myeongeui Jeongdeok (충선선문장무신성현인명의정덕대왕)	
18	Hyeonjong		1659–1674	Yi Yeon (이연)		Great King Janggak Sunmun Sugmu Gyeongin Changhyo (장각순문숙무경인창효대왕)	
19	Sukjong		1674–1720	Yi Gwang (이광); Yi Sun (이순)		Great King Huisun Jangmun Heonmu Gyeongmyeong Wonhyo (희순장문헌무경명원효대왕)	
20	Gyeongjong		1720–1724	Yi Yun (이윤)		Great King Gakgong Deokmun Ikmu Sunin Seonhyo (각공덕문익무순인선효대왕)	
21	Yeongjo		1724–1776	Yi Geum (이금)		Great King Jangsun Igmun Seonmu Huigyeong Hyeonhyo (장순익문선무희경현효대왕)	
22	Jeongjo		1776–1800	Yi San (이산)		Great King Gongseon Munseong Muyeol Seongin Janghyo (공선문성무열성인장효대왕); Emperor Seon (선황제)	
23	Sunjo		1800–1834	Yi Hong (이홍)		Great King Seongak Munan Mujeong Yeonggyeong Seonghyo (선각문안무정영경성효대왕); Emperor Suk (숙황제)	
24	Heonjong		1834–1849	Yi Hwan (이환)		Great King Jangsuk Gyeongmun Wimu Myeongin Cheolhyo (장숙경문위무명인철효대왕); Emperor Seong (성황제)	
25	Cheoljong		1849–1864	Yi Won-beom (이원범); Yi Byeon (이변)		Great King Chunggyeong Munhyeon Museong Heonin Yeonghyo (충경문현무성헌인영효대왕); Emperor Jang (장황제)	
26	Gojong		1864–1897 (1897–1907)^{1}	Yi Jae-hwang (이재황); Yi Hui (이희)	Gaeguk (개국); Geonyang (건양); Gwangmu (광무)	Emperor Tae (태황제)	
27	Sunjong		1907–1910	Yi Cheok (이척)	Yunghui (융희)	Emperor Hyo (효황제)	
1 see Korean Empire section.

== See also ==
- List of monarchs of Korea
