= Queen Munjeong =

Queen of Joseon from 1517 to 1544

Regent of Joseon
- Tenure: 17 August 1545 – 30 August 1553
- Monarch: Myeongjong

Grand Queen Dowager of Joseon
- Tenure: 17 August 1545 – 15 May 1565
- Predecessor: Grand Queen Dowager Inhye; Grand Queen Dowager Insu
- Successor: Grand Queen Dowager Soseong

Queen Dowager of Joseon
- Tenure: 9 December 1544 – 17 August 1545
- Predecessor: Queen Dowager Jasun
- Successor: Queen Dowager Gongui

Queen Consort of Joseon
- Tenure: 16 August 1517 – 9 December 1544
- Predecessor: Queen Janggyeong
- Successor: Queen Inseong
- Born: 12 December 1501; Hanseong, Joseon
- Died: 15 May 1565 (aged 63); Sodeokdang, Changdeokgung, Hanseong, Joseon
- Burial: Taereung, Seoul, South Korea
- Spouse: King Jungjong (m. 1517; died 1544)
- Issue Detail: 1 son, 4 daughters (Note: And 1 child of uncertain gender.)
Regnal name
- Seongryeol Inmyeong (성렬인명; 聖烈仁明) (Note: Known as honorific name (존호; 尊號) in the Sinosphere, its closest equivalent in the English-speaking world is the regnal name.)
Posthumous name
- Queen Munjeong (문정왕후; 文定王后)
- Clan: Papyeong Yun (by birth); Jeonju Yi (by marriage)
- Dynasty: Yi
- Father: Yun Ji-im, Internal Prince Pasan
- Mother: Internal Princess Consort Jeonseong, of the Jeonui Yi clan
- Religion: Buddhism

Korean name
- Hangul: 문정왕후
- Hanja: 文定王后
- RR: Munjeong wanghu
- MR: Munjŏng wanghu

Queen Munjeong (Korean: 문정왕후; Hanja: 文定王后; 12 December 1501 – 15 May 1565), of the Papyeong Yun clan, was the third wife of King Jungjong, the 11th monarch of Joseon, and the mother of King Myeongjong. She was queen of Joseon from 1517 until her husband's death in 1544. She was then elevated to queen dowager during the reign of her stepson, King Injong, and was styled as Grand Queen Dowager Seongryeol during the reign of her son, King Myeongjong.

Queen Munjeong served as regent during the minority of her son and formally stepped down from the position in 1453, but held onto enough leverage to remain the de facto ruler of Joseon until her death. During her tenure, she allowed her younger brother, Yun Won-hyeong, to monopolize power and instigated the Fourth Literati Purge in an effort to eliminate the faction of Yun Im, King Injong's maternal uncle and also her own relative. The overindulgence she displayed toward her corrupt family members and their close associates, as well as her ardent promotion of Buddhism, made Queen Munjeong a target of criticism from the Sarim faction of Neo-Confucian scholars and cemented her infamy in Korean history.

Although modern historians view it as excessive to attribute all the various problems that plagued the era solely to Queen Munjeong and argue that it is necessary to consider the accumulation of systemic issues, it is indisputable that the political and bureaucratic chaos stemming from Yeonsangun's tyranny and the turmoil of King Jungjong's reign continued to flourish unabated and was at its height under Queen Munjeong. Ultimately, this institutional breakdown was only brought under control to some extent after King Myeongjong assumed direct rule, but royal authority remained constrained.

== Biography ==
=== Early life and lineage ===
The future Queen Munjeong was born during the reign of Yeonsangun, as the younger daughter and fifth child among five sons and two daughters. Her father was Yun Ji-im (윤지임) and her mother was a lady from the Jeonui Yi clan (전의 이씨). She was considered a pretty and thoughtful girl in her youth. According to the Veritable Records of the Joseon Dynasty, she was intelligent and formidable by nature, possessing an outstanding memory.

Her natal Papyeong Yun clan, which had been a prominent aristocratic lineage since the foundation of Goryeo, rose to supreme power in Joseon upon King Sejo's accession to the throne and finally reached its peak in the first half of the 16th century. Their ascendancy was mainly due to their status as royal in-laws, producing four queens in the span of 62 years. The siblings of Lady Yun's great-great-grandfather, Yun Sa-heun (윤사흔), included Queen Jeonghui and Yun Sa-yun (윤사윤); the latter's great-granddaughter was Lady Yun's predecessor, Queen Janggyeong. Furthermore, Yun Sa-heun's first cousin once removed, Yun Gon (윤곤), was a great-grandfather of Queen Jeonghyeon.

One of Lady Yun's nieces (Note: Daughter of Yun Won-ryang (윤원량).) entered the palace and eventually became Concubine Suk (숙빈 윤씨), a high-ranking consort of King Injong, whereas her nephew, Yun Baek-won (윤백원), (Note: Eldest son of Yun Won-ro (윤원로).) later married the only daughter of Princess Hyohye. Both Injong and Hyohye were the children of the late Queen Janggyeong.

=== Marriage ===
Lady Yun's branch of the clan held high positions in the past, but their successful government careers had ended starting from her grandfather's generation. With many children, they were living in hardship, as was typical for fallen aristocratic families.

At this time, the second wife of King Jungjong, Queen Yun (posthumously Queen Janggyeong), had died shortly after giving birth to the heir to the throne, Yi Ho, and the subsequent move to reinstate Jungjong's first wife, the Deposed Queen Shin (posthumously Queen Dangyeong), had failed. Queen Dowager Jasun resolved to choose a new daughter-in-law from among her relatives, a decision supported by Queen Janggyeong's elder brother, Yun Im. Following the end of the mourning period for Queen Janggyeong, Lady Yun passed the selection process and was invested as queen in 1517. She was four months away from her 17th birthday and King Jungjong was 29 years old.

=== As queen ===
Lady Yun's main responsibility upon entering the palace was raising the 2-year-old crown prince, which later became the justification for strengthening her political standing. Meanwhile, besides being unable to forget the Deposed Queen Shin, King Jungjong was surrounded by numerous women in the palace, several of them extremely favored. He also already had four sons, including a legitimate heir. Lady Yun was therefore not a particularly welcome presence, but merely someone who was placed in the position because of pressure from the court officials. She had neither a notable family background nor exceptional beauty that could mesmerize Jungjong, and after conceiving with difficulty three years into the marriage, she gave birth to daughters in succession between 1521 and 1530. She often clashed with the royal consorts, at times leading to humiliating defeats, and could initially only somewhat keep them in check due to her status as Queen Janggyeong's close relative and the crown prince's guardian.

From the very beginning, Lady Yun was in conflict with Concubine Gyeong (경빈 박씨), who, as one of Jungjong's most favored consorts and mother of his eldest son, had previously expected to be promoted to the position of queen, and once Lady Yun entered the palace, began plotting to have her own son become crown prince. Despite her modest background, Concubine Gyeong was a peerless beauty and displayed great wit that made people gravitate toward her. Another rival was Concubine Hui. Although without Concubine Gyeong's beauty and political acumen, she had a warm and kind disposition that gave a favorable impression to others, and was the daughter of Hong Gyeong-ju (홍경주), one of the meritorious subjects who had led the coup d'état that put Jungjong on the throne.

==== Establishing a power base ====
Concubine Hui lost her footing after Hong Gyeong-ju's death in 1521, but Concubine Gyeong's influence remained intact and the court began to see three major power blocs forming: Nam Gon and Shim Jeong (심정) around Concubine Gyeong and her son, Prince Bokseong (복성군); Yun Im and Kim An-ro around the crown prince; and Yun Won-ro (윤원로) and Yun Won-hyeong around Lady Yun.

In 1527, the "Incident of the Scorched Rat" (작서의 변) broke out when a burnt rat was found hanging on a tree in the crown prince's quarters. It was later revealed that the event had been orchestrated by Kim Hui (김희), Princess Hyohye's husband and the second son of Kim An-ro, but Concubine Gyeong and Prince Bokseong were identified as the culprits at the time. Taking advantage of this opportunity, Lady Yun implicitly supported the attacks on Concubine Gyeong's faction, and Concubine Gyeong and her son were ultimately banished from the palace.

In 1534, Lady Yun gave birth to her long-awaited son, Yi Hwan. She had served as the crown prince's devoted guardian for 17 years, but now she quickly began to antagonize her stepson, Yi Ho, who was said to have remained extremely filial to her. Unofficial histories describe her attempt to kill Yi Ho by setting fire to his quarters and blame his early death on poisoned refreshments she served to him, but it is difficult to find conclusive evidence for those claims. Nevertheless, surviving official records recount how Lady Yun subjected her own son to psychological torment, which continued even after he took the throne.

In the meantime, Kim An-ro and his supporters had succeeded in seizing power after the fall of Concubine Gyeong's faction. They then joined forces with Yun Im in a bid to purge Lady Yun's faction under the pretext of protecting the crown prince, but a thwarted plan to depose Lady Yun resulted in Kim An-ro's exile and execution. Despite the setback, Yun Im persisted in his quest to oust Lady Yun. This political conflagration culminated in the dominant Hungu faction devolving into two new factions: the Greater Yun (대윤) of Yun Im and the Lesser Yun (소윤) of Yun Won-ro and Yun Won-hyeong. Additionally, Yun Im actively worked to reconcile with the Sarim faction, and numerous scholars joined his broader coalition as they held high hopes for the crown prince who had been educated by Jo Gwang-jo and Yi Hwang.

=== Widowhood ===
Following King Jungjong's death in 1544, Yi Ho (posthumously King Injong) acceded to the throne and Lady Yun became queen dowager.

However, King Injong died under mysterious circumstances just eight months later and rumors accusing Lady Yun of being the mastermind behind his death soon spread inside and outside the palace. While the rumors endure to this day, a majority of modern historians agree that given his frail health, King Injong was probably unable to withstand the strict observation of mourning rites to which he subjected himself. In this scenario, Lady Yun can at most be blamed for choosing to set up Jungjong's funeral hall in Changgyeonggung, making it difficult for King Injong, who lived in Gyeongbokgung, to visit.

=== Regency ===
King Injong died without issue and the throne passed to the 11-year-old Yi Hwan (posthumously King Myeongjong). Lady Yun was elevated to the position of grand queen dowager and received the honorific title Seongryeol (성렬; lit. ''sacred and unyielding''). As her son was underage, she also became regent, the second Joseon royal consort to take on the role after her distant aunt, Queen Jeonghui. Conversely, Lady Yun relied exclusively on family members and her tenure was characterized by three distinct instruments — namely purges, populism and nepotism — whereas Queen Jeonghui had employed both able officials and her own relatives, with her regency becoming known as an era of stability and pragmatic governance.

Lady Yun's first act as regent was to reinstate Yun Won-ro and Yun Won-hyeong, and backed by her, the two brothers immediately began hatching conspiracies. After a failed scheme spearheaded by Yun Won-ro, Yun Won-hyeong enlisted the support of key officials who harbored personal grudges against the Greater Yun faction. They accused Yun Im of having plotted to sidestep Myeongjong after King Injong's death and instead pass the throne to either Concubine Hui's younger son, Prince Bongseong (봉성군), or to his own nephew, (Note: He was the second son of Yun Im's eldest sister who had become the daughter-in-law of Grand Prince Wolsan through her marriage to Prince Deokpung (덕풍군).) Prince Gyerim (계림군). This allegation triggered the Fourth Literati Purge, which saw the executions of Yun Im, Prince Gyerim and Left State Councilor Yu Gwan (유관), who had previously impeached the Yun brothers and opposed Lady Yun's regency, among others. The Hungu faction once again seized control of the government, while the political base of the Sarim shrank even further, and the factional divisions that emerged during this purge became one of the underlying causes of the intense partisan strife that characterized the middle and late Joseon periods.

Cracks then began to appear between Yun Won-ro and Yun Won-hyeong. When Yun Won-hyeong instigated their cousin, Yun Chun-nyeon (윤춘년), to submit a petition of impeachment, Lady Yun ultimately stood with her youngest brother and ordered Yun Won-ro's exile and later execution. Owing to this betrayal, Yun Baek-won became his uncle's political rival and chose to side with the newly rising Yi Ryang. Nevertheless, Lady Yun continued to show partiality to him.

Following this latest shake-up, the Yangjae Station Wall Inscription Incident erupted in 1547. Yun Won-hyeong's faction claimed that this event occurred because the punishment meted out in the recent purge had been insufficient and advised that Yun Im's remaining forces be eradicated. Consequently, Song In-su (송인수), who had once impeached Yun Won-hyeong, was dismissed from office, and Yi Yak-bing (이약빙), the adopted son of Sugui Kim and father-in-law of Yun Im's second daughter, was executed due to the aforementioned familial connection. Twenty others, many of them members of the Sarim, were sent into exile and Prince Bongseong was at last forced to commit suicide.

Having eliminated most of the opposition, Yun Won-hyeong easily rose from inspector general to vice minister of revenue (호조 참판) in 1545, minister of rites in 1547, minister of personnel in 1548, concurrently minister of personnel and right state councilor in 1551, and chief state councilor in 1563. His advancement and ruthless methods had quickly strengthened Lady Yun's position and made it possible to concentrate all power in her hands.

==== Pro-Buddhism policies ====
Despite fierce resistance from the Neo-Confucian elite, Lady Yun pushed forward the revival of the Seon and Gyo (교) schools of Buddhism, establishing the Seon school at Bongeunsa and the Gyo school at Bongseonsa. She designated over 300 temples as official temples and selected approximately 4,000 monks over two years under the monastic ordination certification system (도첩제). The monastic state examination (승과시) was also reinstated, allowing figures such as Hyujeong and Yujeong to gain prominence. Through the introduction of her sister-in-law, Jeong Nan-jeong, Lady Yun had previously come to know Bowu (보우), whom she named abbot of Bongeunsa in 1548. He went on to play a crucial role in her pro-Buddhism policies and she eventually made the bizarre decision to appoint him as minister of war. Additionally, Lady Yun commissioned a massive collection of 400 Buddhist artworks in 1563, of which six are still extant.

Strictly speaking, favoring Buddhism was a characteristic of the Joseon royal family, particularly of royal women, throughout the entire dynasty. However, never before or after did Buddhism achieve in Joseon the same level of political dominance, state patronage and institutional power as it did during Lady Yun's regency. Although her personal devout faith certainly played a major role in the measures, the promotion of Buddhism was also a stratagem to restrain the Neo-Confucian Sarim scholars who persisted in their opposition to Lady Yun.

=== Later life ===
Lady Yun stepped down from her position as regent in 1553, two years later than it had originally been agreed. From then on, she refrained from interfering in politics as directly as she had during her regency, but continued to exert great influence over the royal court through Yun Won-hyeong and his faction.

=== Death and aftermath ===
Lady Yun died at the age of 63, after developing a cold while performing ritual bathing for a Buddhist ceremony. She was buried within Taereung (태릉), today part of the Taegangneung burial ground in Nowon District, Seoul. King Jungjong's tomb was originally constructed at the current location of Yereung (the resting place of King Cheoljong and Queen Cheorin), next to Queen Janggyeong's tomb, but Lady Yun, wanting to be buried next to her husband, had him moved to the vicinity of Seolleung (the resting place of King Jungjong's parents) in Gangnam District. However, the chosen area was low-lying and prone to flooding, so she was ultimately buried alone on the opposite side of Seoul.

After Lady Yun's death, Yun Won-hyeong and Jeong Nan-jeong were exiled and later committed suicide, and the Papyeong Yun clan swiftly lost its political standing. Bowu was also exiled to Jeju Island, where he was murdered by an official who disapproved of the pro-Buddhism policies.

== Titles ==
- During the reign of Yeonsangun (r. 1495–1506):
  - Lady, of the Papyeong Yun clan (파평 윤씨; 坡平尹氏; from 12 December 1501)
    - Yun Ji-im's daughter (윤지임의 딸)
    - Lady Yun (윤씨; 尹氏)
- During the reign of King Jungjong (r. 1506–1544):
  - Queen (왕비; 王妃; from 16 August 1517)
- During the reign of King Injong (r. 1544–1545):
  - Queen Dowager (왕대비; 王大妃; from 9 December 1544)
- During the reign of King Myeongjong (r. 1545–1567):
  - Grand Queen Dowager Seongryeol (성렬대왕대비; 聖烈大王大妃; from 17 August 1545)
  - Queen Munjeong (문정왕후; 文定王后; from 1565)

== Family ==
- Father: Yun Ji-im (윤지임), Internal Prince Pasan (파산부원군; 1475–1534)
- Mother: Internal Princess Consort Jeonseong (전성부부인), of the Jeonui Yi clan (전의 이씨; 1475–1511)
- Sibling(s)
  - Yun Won-gae (윤원개; 1493–1535) (Note: ▪︎Wife: Lady, of the Yi clan (이씨); daughter of Yi Bo (이보). ▪︎Issue: 2 sons, 1 daughter.)
  - Yun Won-ryang (윤원량; 1495–1569) (Note: ▪︎Wife: Lady, of the Suncheon Jang clan (순천 장씨); daughter of Jang Il-chwi (장일취). ▪︎Issue: 3 sons, 1 daughter; including Concubine Suk (숙빈 윤씨; consort of King Injong).)
  - Yun Won-pil (윤원필; 1496 – 9 May 1547) (Note: ▪︎Wife: Lady, of the Gyeongju Jeong clan (경주 정씨); daughter of Jeong Chan (정찬). ▪︎Issue: 4 sons.)
  - Lady, of the Papyeong Yun clan (파평 윤씨)
  - Yun Won-ro (윤원로; 1502 – 26 December 1547) (Note: ▪︎Wife: Lady of the Pyeongchang Yi clan (평창 이씨); daughter of Yi Ryang (이량) and great-great-great-granddaughter of King Sejong. ▪︎Issue: 4 sons (1 concubine-born son), 2 daughters. [Lineage: King Sejong → Grand Prince Gwangpyeong (광평대군; 1425–1445) →Prince Yeongsun (영순군; 1444–1470) → Prince Namcheon (남천군; 1458–1519) → Lady, of the Jeonju Yi clan → Lady Yi])
  - Yun Won-hyeong (윤원형; 1503 – 18 November 1565)
- Husband: King Jungjong (중종대왕; 25 April 1488 – 9 December 1544)
  - Father-in-law: King Seongjong (성종대왕; 28 August 1457 – 29 January 1495)
  - Mother-in-law: Queen Jeonghyeon (정현왕후), of the Papyeong Yun clan (파평 윤씨; 30 July 1462 – 23 September 1530)
- Issue
  - Princess Uihye (의혜공주; 12 May 1521 – 1564); given name Ok-hye (옥혜) (Note: Married Han Gyeong-rok (한경록), Prince Consort Cheongwon (청원위) from the Cheongju Han clan (청주 한씨); great-great-great-grandson of Han Hwak. They had issue (3 sons, 2 daughters); among their descendants is Queen Ingyeong.)
  - Princess Hyosun (효순공주; 1522–1538); given name Ok-ryeon (옥련) (Note: Married Gu Sa-an (구사안), Prince Consort Neungwon (능원위; 1523–1562) from the Neungseong Gu clan (능성 구씨); great-nephew of Deposed Queen Shin, uncle of Queen Inheon and a descendant of both King Sejong and Grand Prince Hyoryeong. They had no biological issue (1 adopted son). [Paternal lineage: King Taejong → King Sejong → Grand Prince Yeongeung (영응대군; 1434–1467) → County Princess Gilan (길안현주; 1457–1519) → Gu Hui-gyeong (구희경; 1488–?) → Gu Sun (구순; 1507–?) → Gu Sa-an; Maternal lineage: King Taejong → Grand Prince Hyoryeong → Prince Boseong (보성군; 1416–1499) → Pyeongseong Dojeong (평성도정; 1436–1510) → Prince Uisin (의신군; 1492–?) → Lady, of the Jeonju Yi clan → Gu Sa-an])
  - Unnamed child (1528–?) (Note: Uncertain gender; most likely female.)
  - Princess Gyeonghyeon (경현공주; 14 September 1530 – 16 September 1584); given name Ok-hyeon (옥현) (Note: Married Shin Ui (신의), Prince Consort Yeongcheon (영천위; ?–1584) from the Goryeong Shin clan (고령 신씨); adoptive great-grandson of King Seongjong. They had issue (1 son). [Adoptive lineage: King Seongjong → Princess Hyesuk (혜숙옹주; 1478–?) → Shin Su-gyeong (신수경; 1501–?) → Shin Ui])
  - Yi Hwan (이환), King Myeongjong (명종대왕; 13 July 1534 – 12 August 1567)
  - Princess Insun (인순공주; 1542–1545)

== Ancestry ==
Ancestors of Queen Munjeong

Yun Sa-heun (윤사흔) (Note: Son of Yun Beon and younger brother of Lady Yun; see below.)
Yun Gye-gyeom (윤계겸)
Lady, of the Gyerim Kim clan (계림 김씨)
Yun Uk (윤욱)
Kim Jin-son (김진손)
Lady, of the Gimhae Kim clan (김해 김씨)
Yun Ji-im, Internal Prince Pasan (파산부원군 윤지임)
Jeong Je (정제) (Note: Purported to be a descendant of Jeong Mong-ju, but the lineage is unclear.)
Lady, of the Yeonil Jeong clan (연일 정씨)
Queen Munjeong
Yi Ui-heup (이의흡)
Yi Sin-hyo (이신효)
Lady, of the Nampyeong Mun clan (남평 문씨)
Yi Deok-sung (이덕숭)
Lady, of the Seong clan (성씨)
Internal Princess Consort Jeonseong, of the Jeonui Yi clan (전성부부인 전의 이씨)
Hong Won-yong (홍원용)
Hong Sun-seong (홍순성)
Lady, of the Papyeong Yun clan (파평 윤씨) (Note: Daughter of Yun Beon and elder sister of Yun Sa-heun; see above.)
Lady, of the Namyang Hong clan (남양 홍씨)

== In popular culture ==
- Portrayed by Choi Eun-hee in the 1967 film The Queen Moonjung.
- Portrayed by Kim Yong-rim in the 1981 MBC TV series The Lady from Gyodong.
- Portrayed by Kim Hye-ja in the 1985 MBC TV series 500 Years of Joseon: The Wind Orchid.
- Portrayed by Kim Min-jung in the 1996 KBS2 TV series Jo Gwang Jo.
- Portrayed by Kim Cheong in the 1996–1997 SBS TV series Im Kkeok Jung.
- Portrayed by Jeon In-hwa in the 2001–2002 SBS TV series Ladies of the Palace.
- Portrayed by Park Jung-sook in the 2003–2004 MBC TV series Jewel in the Palace.
- Portrayed by Lee Duk-hee in the 2008 KBS2 TV series Hometown Legends.
- Portrayed by Park Ji-young in the 2013 KBS2 TV series The Fugitive of Joseon.
- Portrayed by Kim Mi-sook in the 2016 MBC TV series Flowers of the Prison.
- Portrayed by Kim Young-ae in the 2016 JTBC TV series Secret Healer.
- Portrayed by Lee Kyung-jin in the 2019 TV Chosun series Joseon Survival Period.
- Inspired a fictional queen dowager portrayed by Park Ji-yeon in the 2022 KBS2 TV series Bloody Heart.

== See also ==
- Jungjong Restoration
- Political factions of Joseon
- Consort kin
- History of Korea
- Styles and titles in Joseon

== Notes ==
Queen Munjeong Papyeong Yun clan
Royal titles
Preceded by Queen Janggyeong of the Papyeong Yun clan	Queen Consort of Joseon; 1517–1544	Succeeded by Queen Inseong of the Bannam Park clan
Preceded by Queen Dowager Jasun of the Papyeong Yun clan	Queen Dowager of Joseon; 1544–1545	Succeeded by Queen Dowager Gongui of the Bannam Park clan
Preceded by Grand Queen Dowager Inhye of the Cheongju Han clan ------- Grand Queen Dowager Insu of the Cheongju Han clan	Grand Queen Dowager of Joseon; 1545–1565	Succeeded by Grand Queen Dowager Soseong of the Yonan Kim clan
