= Queen Janggyeong (Joseon) =

Queen of Joseon from 1506 to 1515

Queen Consort of Joseon
- Tenure: 20 September 1507 – 26 March 1515
- Investiture: Geunjeongjeon, Gyeongbokgung
- Predecessor: Queen Dangyeong
- Successor: Queen Munjeong
- Born: 19 August 1491; Hyohyeon-bang, Hanseong, Joseon
- Died: 26 March 1515 (aged 23); Donggung, (Note: Korean: 동궁; Hanja: 東宮; lit. ''East Palace''; residence of the crown prince.) Gyeongbokgung, Hanseong, Joseon
- Burial: Huireung, Seosamneung Cluster, Goyang, South Korea
- Spouse: King Jungjong (m. 1507) (Note: Lady Yun had become Jungjong's consort while he was still a prince, two years prior to her elevation to the position of queen and legitimate wife.)
- Issue Detail: 1 son, 1 daughter
Posthumous name
- Queen Suksin Myeonghye Seonso Uisuk Janggyeong (숙신명혜선소의숙장경왕후; 淑愼明惠宣昭懿淑章敬王后)
- Clan: Papyeong Yun (by birth); Jeonju Yi (by marriage)
- Dynasty: Yi
- Father: Yun Yeo-pil, Internal Prince Pawon
- Mother: Internal Princess Consort Suncheon, of the Suncheon Park clan

Korean name
- Hangul: 장경왕후
- Hanja: 章敬王后
- RR: Janggyeong wanghu
- MR: Changgyŏng wanghu

Queen Janggyeong (Korean: 장경왕후; Hanja: 章敬王后; 19 August 1491 – 26 March 1515), of the Papyeong Yun clan, was the second wife of King Jungjong, the 11th monarch of Joseon, and the mother of King Injong. She was queen of Joseon from 1507 until her death in 1515.

== Biography ==
=== Early life and lineage ===
The future Queen Janggyeong was born during the reign of King Seongjong, as the fifth child and fourth daughter among one son and six daughters. Her father was Yun Yeo-pil (윤여필) and her mother was lady from the Suncheon Park clan (순천 박씨).

Her natal Papyeong Yun clan had established themselves as a pillar of the Hungu faction and become a dominant force in the royal court since King Sejo's accession to the throne in 1455 thanks to their marital connections to the royal family — producing four queens, five royal consorts, four princesses consort and seven princes consort throughout the early Joseon period. Lady Yun's great-grandfather, Yun Sa-yun (윤사윤), was the elder brother of Queen Jeonghui and Yun Sa-heun (윤사흔); the latter's great-great-granddaughter eventually became Lady Yun's successor, Queen Munjeong. Furthermore, Yun Sa-yun's first cousin once removed, Yun Gon (윤곤), was a great-grandfather of Queen Jeonghyeon. Via her paternal grandmother, Lady Yun was also a great-great-granddaughter of Grand Prince Hyoryeong.

On her maternal side, she was a great-great-granddaughter of Shim On, and a niece of Park Won-jong and Grand Princess Consort Seungpyeong, who raised Lady Yun after her mother died in childbirth in 1498.

=== Life in the palace ===
In 1505, at the age of 14, Lady Yun was selected as a concubine of Grand Prince Jinseong (as King Jungjong was known at the time). Within less than a year, Jinseong acceded to the throne following a coup d'état and Lady Yun was appointed as a royal consort of the junior second rank (숙의; sugui).

King Jungjong was then pressured by the powerful coup leaders, including Lady Yun's maternal uncle, Park Won-jong, to cast out his wife of seven years, Lady Shin (posthumously Queen Dangyeong), because she was closely related through marriage to Yeonsangun and her father had refused to participate in the coup d'état. One year later, Lady Yun was invested as queen, bypassing other consorts who were daughters of meritorious subjects of the coup. At that time, the court was controlled by Park Won-jong and his assistance played a significant role in Lady Yun's elevation. Her status as a niece-in-law of Grand Prince Wolsan and a relative of Queen Dowager Jasun also served as an advantage.

Lady Yun gave birth to Princess Hyohye in 1511, followed by a son named Yi Ho (posthumously King Injong) on 20 March 1515.

=== Death and aftermath ===
Lady Yun never recovered from childbirth and died six days later, at the age of 23. She was buried within Huireung (휘릉), today part of the Seosamneung Cluster in Goyang, Gyeonggi Province. King Jungjong, who survived Lady Yun by 29 years was later buried alongside her, but Queen Munjeong had the king's tomb moved to its current location in Gangnam District, Seoul as she wished to be buried alongside him after her own death; nevertheless, Queen Munjong was ultimately buried alone in Nowon District, on the opposite side of Seoul.

King Jungjong married his third and last wife (posthumously Queen Munjeong) two years after Lady Yun's death. The new queen, a cousin of the late Lady Yun, would go on to give birth to another legitimate son, Yi Hwan (posthumously King Myeongjong). This paved the way for the emergence of the Greater Yun (대윤) and Lesser Yun (소윤) factions; the former centered on Yi Ho (Injong)'s maternal uncle, Yun Im, and the latter was led by Yi Hwan (Myeongjong)'s maternal uncles, Yun Won-hyeong and Yun Won-ro (윤원로). Their conflict culminated in the Fourth Literati Purge, in which Yun Im was executed and his supporters ousted.

== Titles ==
- During the reign of King Seongjong (r. 1470–1495):
  - Lady, of the Papyeong Yun clan (파평 윤씨; 坡平尹氏; from 19 August 1491)
    - Yun Yeo-pil's daughter (윤여필의 딸)
    - Lady Yun (윤씨; 尹氏)
- During the reign of Yeonsangun (r. 1495–1506):
  - Grand Prince Jinseong's concubine (진성대군의 첩; from 1505)
- During the reign of King Jungjong (r. 1506–1544):
  - Sugui (Note: lit. ''Lady of Warm Deportment'') (숙의; 淑儀; from 1506), royal consort of the junior second rank
  - Queen (왕비; 王妃; from 20 September 1507)
  - Queen Janggyeong (장경왕후; 章敬王后; from 1515)

== Family ==
- Father: Yun Yeo-pil (윤여필), Internal Prince Pawon (파원부원군; 1466–1555)
- Mother: Internal Princess Consort Suncheon (순천부부인), of the Suncheon Park clan (순천 박씨; ?–1498)
- Sibling(s)
  - Lady, of the Papyeong Yun clan (파평 윤씨; 1485–1536) (Note: Married Yi Yi (이이), Prince Deokpung (덕풍군; 1485–1506); son of Grand Prince Wolsan. They had issue (3 sons).)
  - Lady, of the Papyeong Yun clan (파평 윤씨) (Note: Married Yi Jeong (이정), Prince Palgye (팔계군; 1454–1521); fourth son of Grand Prince Imyong. [Biological lineage: King Sejong → Grand Prince Imyong → Prince Palgye; Adoptive lineage: King Taejong → Prince Hamnyeong (함녕군; 1403–1467) → Prince Deokseong (덕성군; 1430–1473) → Prince Palgye])
  - Yun Im (윤임; 26 July 1487 – 30 August 1545)
  - Lady, of the Papyeong Yun clan (파평 윤씨; 1488–?); given name Cheon-deok (천덕) (Note: Married Kim Hon (김혼) from the Gangneung Kim clan (강릉 김씨).)
  - Lady, of the Papyeong Yun clan (파평 윤씨) (Note: Married Yi Eok-son (이억손), Goyang Bujeong (고양부정; 1492–?); great-great-grandson of King Sejong. [Lineage: King Sejong → Grand Prince Gwangpyeong (광평대군; 1425–1445) → Prince Yeongsun (영순군; 1444–1470) → Prince Cheongan (청안군; 1462–1495) → Goyang Bujeong])
  - Lady, of the Papyeong Yun clan (파평 윤씨; 1518–?); given name Ok-chun (옥춘) (Note: Half-sister.) (Note: Married Bang Ung (방웅) from the Onyang Bang clan (온양 방씨); uncle-in-law of Yi Sun-sin.)
- Husband: King Jungjong (중종대왕; 25 April 1488 – 9 December 1544)
  - Father-in-law: King Seongjong (성종대왕; 28 August 1457 – 29 January 1495)
  - Mother-in-law: Queen Jeonghyeon (정현왕후), of the Papyeong Yun clan (파평 윤씨; 30 July 1462 – 23 September 1530)
- Issue
  - Princess Hyohye (효혜공주; 23 June 1511 – 16 May 1531); given name Ok-ha (옥하)
  - Yi Ho (이호), King Injong (인종대왕; 20 March 1515 – 17 August 1545)

== Ancestry ==
Ancestors of Queen Janggyeong (Joseon)

Yun Beon, Internal Prince Papyeong (파평부원군 윤번)
Yun Sa-yun (윤사윤)
Internal Princess Consort Heungnyeong, of the Incheon Yi clan (흥녕부대부인 인천 이씨)
Yun Bo (윤보)
Choe Ui-geom (최의검)
Lady, of the Suwon Choe clan (수원 최씨)
Yun Yeo-pil, Internal Prince Pawon (파원부원군 윤여필)
Grand Prince Hyoryeong (효령대군)
Prince Yeongcheon (영천군)
Grand Princess Consort Yeseong, of the Haeju Jeong clan (예성부부인 해주 정씨)
Lady, of the Jeonju Yi clan (전주 이씨)
Princess Consort, of the Yecheon Gwon clan (군부인 예천 권씨)
Queen Janggyeong
Park Seok-myeong (박석명)
Park Geo-so (박거소)
Lady, of the Kaesong Wang clan (개성 왕씨)
Park Jung-seon (박중선)
Shim On, Internal Prince Cheongcheon (청천부원군 심온)
Lady, of the Cheongsong Shim clan (청송 심씨)
Grand Princess Consort of Samhan State, of the Sunheung An clan (삼한국대부인 순흥 안씨)
Internal Princess Consort Suncheon, of the Suncheon Park clan (순천부부인 순천 박씨)
Heo Gyun (허균)
Lady, of the Yangcheon Heo clan (양천 허씨)

== In popular culture ==
- Portrayed by Park Joo-mi in the 1996 KBS2 TV series Jo Gwang Jo.
- Portrayed by Oh Ah-rang in the 2001–2002 SBS TV series Ladies of the Palace.
- Portrayed by Go Bo-gyeol in the 2017 KBS2 TV series Queen for Seven Days.
- Inspired a fictional queen portrayed by Woo Mi-hwa in the 2022 KBS2 TV series Bloody Heart.

== See also ==
- Jungjong Restoration
- Consort kin
- Styles and titles in Joseon
- Korean literati purges
- Political factions of Joseon

== Notes ==
Queen Janggyeong (Joseon) Papyeong Yun clan
Royal titles
Preceded by Queen Dangyeong of the Geochang Shin clan	Queen Consort of Joseon; 1507–1515	Succeeded by Queen Munjeong of the Papyeong Yun clan
