= Yangjae Station Wall Inscription Incident =

1547 political purge in Korea

- Hangul: 양재역 벽서 사건
- Hanja: 良才驛壁書事件
- RR: Yangjaeyeok byeokseo sageon
- MR: Yangjaeyŏk pyŏksŏ sakŏn

The Yangjae Station Wall Inscription Incident (Korean: 양재역 벽서 사건; Hanja: 良才驛壁書事件) was one of the many political purges that occurred in Korea during the Joseon period. It is also known as the Jeongmi Sahwa, where Jeongmi refers to name of the year 1547 (the second year of King Myeongjong's reign, during the regency of Queen Munjeong).

The initial event was a graffiti posted on a wall at the Yangjae stage Station (now Yangjae-dong, Seocho District, Seoul). This was a notice, posted on the order of Yun Wŏnhyŏng, to defame himself and his relatives.

"A female leader at the top, treacherous ministers Li Gi and others at bottom. The country is about to perish, but we just wait and see. Isn't that scary? 女主執政于上, 奸臣李芑等弄權於下, 國之將亡, 可立而待。 豈不寒心哉?"

This followed the Eulsa purge with the graffiti signalling to Li Gi and Queen Munjeong (the regent) that the Eulsa purge had been insufficient in getting rid of the DaeYun faction. Hence, the graffiti was used by the SoYun faction as a basis for removing its political opponents, starting from Prince Bong-seong (봉성군; 鳳城君李岏, 1528–1547). This purge was enlarged to all the survivors of the DaeYun faction.

== Sources ==
- Sillok (1571). "明宗大王實錄, Myeongjong sillok".
- NIKH "양재역벽서사건[良才驛壁書事件]" [Yangjae Station Graffiti Incident]. 국사편찬위원휘 National Institute of Korean History.
- Pratt, Keith L.; Rutt, Richard; Hoare, James E. (1999). Korea, A Historical and Cultural Dictionary. Durham East Asia Series. Routledge. ISBN 978-0-7007-0463-7., 568 pages
