= Injong of Joseon =

King of Joseon from 1544 to 1545

Injong

King of Joseon
- Reign: 9 December 1544 – 17 August 1545
- Enthronement: 14 December 1544; Myeongjeongjeon, Changgyeonggung
- Predecessor: Jungjong
- Successor: Myeongjong

Crown Prince of Joseon
- Tenure: 18 May 1520 – 9 December 1544
- Predecessor: Crown Prince Hwang
- Successor: Crown Prince Bu
- Born: 20 March 1515; Jaseondang, Gyeongbokgung, Hanseong, Joseon
- Died: 17 August 1545 (aged 30); Cheongyeonru, Gyeongbokgung, Hanseong, Joseon
- Burial: Hyoreung, Seosamneung Cluster, Goyang, South Korea
- Spouse: Queen Inseong (m. 1524)
Names
- Yi Ho (이호; 李峼)
Era dates
- Adopted the era name of the Ming dynasty (Note: Gajeong (Jiajing) (가정; 嘉靖): 1544–1545)
Posthumous name
- Joseon: Great King Yeongjeong Heonmun Uimu Jangsuk Heumhyo (영정헌문의무장숙흠효대왕; 榮靖獻文懿武章肅欽孝大王); Ming dynasty: Yeongjeong (영정; 榮靖)
Temple name
- Injong (인종; 仁宗)
- Clan: Jeonju Yi
- Dynasty: Yi
- Father: King Jungjong
- Mother: Queen Janggyeong
- Religion: Confucianism (Neo-Confucianism)

Korean name
- Hangul: 인종
- Hanja: 仁宗
- Lit.: "Benevolent Ancestor"
- RR: Injong
- MR: Injong

Courtesy name
- Hangul: 천윤
- Hanja: 天胤
- RR: Cheonyun
- MR: Ch'ŏnyun

Childhood name
- Hangul: 억명
- Hanja: 億命
- RR: Eokmyeong
- MR: Ŏngmyŏng

Injong (Korean: 인종; Hanja: 仁宗; 20 March 1515 – 17 August 1545), (Note: In the Korean calendar (lunisolar), he was born on the 25th day of the 2nd lunar month and died on the 1st day of the 7th lunar month.) personal name Yi Ho, was the 12th monarch of Joseon. His father was King Jungjong and his mother was Queen Janggyeong, the younger sister of Yun Im. He had the shortest reign among all of Joseon's kings.

== Biography ==
=== Birth ===
Annals of King Jungjong, Volume 21, 10th Year of Jungjong's Reign, February 25th, 6th Article / The Crown Prince is Born at the Beginning of the Night

At the beginning of the night, during the first drum (초고, Chogo), the Crown Prince (원자, Wonja) was born.

Annals of King Jungjong, Volume 21, 10th Year of Jungjong's Reign, February 26th, 1st Article / Jeong Gwang-pil Reports on the Birth of the Crown Prince

Jeong Gwang-pil, the Left State Councillor, led the officials to offer congratulations in the courtyard of Geunjeongjeon Hall. He presented a memorial, stating:

"Now that the month has completed its cycle, a noble figure has been born. This is a blessing from heaven and a great joy for the nation. Your Majesty, with your virtuous and divine appearance, you are both scholarly and martial. May your great name shine brightly for a thousand years. You have sought and obtained a son, establishing a beautiful heir without any flaws. On this auspicious day, we welcome the arrival of great fortune. We, your humble servants, are fortunate to witness this prosperous era and wish to respond with the poetry of Zhou. We earnestly pray for longevity and blessings."

Following this, an amnesty was proclaimed, and the amnesty document stated:

"The King declares: In inheriting the foundation of our ancestors, it is essential to prioritize the performance of ancestral rites. The joy of having a son is unparalleled. I, a humble descendant, have occupied the throne for ten years without the auspicious sign of a bear dream or the assurance of a successor. Concerned about the importance of succession, I have always been anxious. Now, on the 25th day of the 2nd month of this year, the Crown Prince was born to the Queen. This event not only fulfills the hopes of the people but also brings great beauty to the royal family. How can this be merely my personal joy? Let all the people share in this happiness. Ah, the plan for ten thousand generations begins now. Let us cleanse the four corners of the realm and all participate in renewal."

Annals of King Jungjong, Volume 21, 10th Year of Jungjong's Reign, February 29th, 1st Article / The Queen and the Crown Prince Move to No Gong-pil's Residence

In the early morning, the Crown Prince (원자, Wonja) was taken to the residence of No Gong-pil, Lord of Gyo-seong (교성군, Gyo-seong Gun), to reside there temporarily. This was because the Queen (중궁, Jungung) was unwell.

Annals of King Jungjong, Volume 21, 10th Year of Jungjong's Reign, March 7th, 4th Article / The Record of the Late Queen Issued from the Palace

"In the 10th year of the reign of King Jungjong, on March 7th, the record of the late queen was issued from the palace.

The queen was born in the 7th month of the year of Gyeongjin (庚辰) during the reign of Emperor Hongzhi (弘治) in a private residence. She lost her mother early and was raised in the house of Lady Park (朴氏), the wife of the deceased Grand Prince Wolsan (月山大君). In the autumn of the year of Byeongin (丙寅), when the King was restoring the dynasty, the queen had not yet been chosen. She was selected and entered the palace, where she was conferred the title of Sook-ui (淑儀). She served the King with propriety and treated her peers generously, displaying unparalleled virtue. At that time, the ministers requested the King to establish a queen, but the King replied, 'The position of the national mother is extremely important and cannot be decided hastily.' In the year of Jeongmyo (丁卯), the ministers again requested, 'The position of the queen cannot remain vacant for long; please establish one quickly.' The King replied, 'There is no one with the virtuous qualities of Sook-ui Yoon; she should be established as the queen.' Thus, in the 8th month, she was elevated to the position of queen.

The queen was naturally intelligent and wise, kind and gentle, and widely read. She served her mother-in-law with utmost devotion, consistently performing her duties from dawn till late at night. She treated the concubines with kindness and raised the children of the secondary wives as if they were her own. She managed the household with strictness and clarity and assisted the King diligently. She often said to the King, 'I have read the ancient texts, and although I may not reach the virtues of a wise wife, my wish is not to be seen as disobedient to Your Majesty's will. If I make any mistakes, please do not hesitate to correct me so that I may amend my faults.' She also said, 'The success or failure of my family depends on the virtue of the queen. How could I seek positions for my relatives? If they are virtuous, public opinion will naturally favor them; if not, public opinion will naturally discard them. Even if they are punished, whose fault would it be? I will not resent it.' During her nine years as queen, she never once requested a position for her relatives or sought to pardon anyone. The King deeply admired her, saying, 'The queen's resolve is lofty, comparable to the virtues of Lady Tai Si (太姒).' Thus, she was highly respected, and no one ever criticized her.

In the year of Shinmi (辛未), on the day of Jeongmyo (丁卯) in the 5th month, she gave birth to a daughter, who was still too young to wear a hairpin. On the day of Gyechuk (癸丑) in the 2nd month of the year of Eulhae (乙亥), she gave birth to the Crown Prince, but only a few days later, she suddenly fell seriously ill. The King was greatly alarmed and personally visited her, asking if there was anything she wished to say. At first, she replied, 'I have received great kindness and have nothing to say,' and only shed tears. The next morning, her condition worsened, and she sat up and wrote a letter to the King, saying, 'Yesterday, my mind was confused, and I could not remember clearly. Upon reflection, I recall that last summer, in a dream, someone told me to name this child Eokmyeong (億命), so I wrote it down and posted it on the wall.' The King verified this and found it to be true. How extraordinary! Despite all efforts to save her, she passed away on the 2nd day of this month in the Eastern Palace of Gyeongbokgung at the age of 25. The King was deeply grieved and lamented, saying, 'It is said that extreme joy brings sorrow. How can there be such a great national celebration and yet such an unforeseen tragedy? Although life and death are determined by heaven, how could heaven take away my virtuous queen so early?' He could not stop mourning. He then instructed the State Council, 'Having lost my virtuous queen so early, my mind is in turmoil, and I am at a loss. I cannot make decisions. Except for matters related to mourning, suspend all other reports.' Inside the palace, there was no one who did not grieve deeply."

The record of the late queen's life and deeds largely follows this account.

=== Reign ===
The young king was very ambitious, and tried to reform the government of the time that was rife with corruption, a legacy of the failed reforms during his father's reign. He rehabilitated Cho Kwangjo and recruited Sarim scholars who turned away from politics after Third Literati Purge of 1519. His maternal uncle Yun Im exercised great power during this period. However, Injong was too often ill and died in 1545, just one year after coming to the throne. Following his death, Yun Im was executed by Yun Won-Hyung in the Fourth Purge of 1545 when King Myeongjong (son of the ambitious Queen Munjeong) succeeded the throne.

=== Death ===
Some historians believe that Injong was poisoned by the Smaller Yun faction, led by Yun Wŏnhyŏng, to enable Injong's half-brother to ascend the throne. Others believe that Queen Munjeong had him murdered. According to unofficial chronicles, there is a tale of Munjeong finally showing love for her "adoptive" son King Injong, after decades of polite indifference (in reality behind-the-scenes hatred).

As Injong went to pay his morning respects, Munjeong's face started radiating with a smile only a mother could give to her child. Injong took it as a sign that the Queen Mother was finally acknowledging him as the king, and in particular as her own son. He ate the Tteok that his step-mother gave him, not knowing that it would be the beginning of the end. He fell ill slowly, not enough to create any suspicion, but quickly enough that historians would later pick up on the event. Three days passed before Injong mysteriously died (after only 9 months of rule).

Queen Munjeong's son became King Myeongjong, while Munjeong became Queen Regent. The chronicles also tell that Munjeong was frequently visited by spirits at night after Injong's death. So disturbed was she that she moved her residence from Gyeongbokgung to Changdeokgung.

== Family ==
- Father: King Jungjong (중종대왕; 25 April 1488 – 9 December 1544)
  - Grandfather: King Seongjong (성종대왕; 28 August 1457 – 29 January 1494)
  - Grandmother: Queen Jeonghyeon (정현왕후), of the Papyeong Yun clan (파평 윤씨; 30 July 1462 – 23 September 1530)
- Mother: Queen Janggyeong (장경왕후), of the Papyeong Yun clan (파평 윤씨; 19 August 1491 – 26 March 1515)
  - Grandfather: Yun Yeo-pil (윤여필), Internal Prince Pawon (파원부원군; 1466–1555)
  - Grandmother: Internal Princess Consort Suncheon (순천부부인), of the Suncheon Park clan (순천 박씨; ?–1498)
- Stepmother: Queen Munjeong (문정왕후), of the Papyeong Yun clan (파평 윤씨; 12 December 1501 – 15 May 1565)

Consort(s)

- Queen Inseong (인성왕후), of the Bannam Park clan (반남 박씨; 28 October 1514 – 16 January 1578)
- Concubine Suk (숙빈), of the Papyeong Yun clan (파평 윤씨)
- Concubine Hye (혜빈), of the Gyeongju Jeong clan (경주 정씨)
- Gwiin (귀인), of the Yeonil Jeong clan (연일 정씨; August 1520 – 25 March 1566)
- Yangje (양제), of the Papyeong Yun clan (파평 윤씨)

== Ancestry ==
Ancestors of Injong of Joseon

King Sejo (세조대왕)
King Deokjong (덕종대왕)
Queen Jeonghui, of the Papyeong Yun clan (정희왕후 파평 윤씨)
King Seongjong (성종대왕)
Han Hwak, Internal Prince Seowon (서원부원군 한확)
Queen Sohye, of the Cheongju Han clan (소혜왕후 청주 한씨)
Internal Princess Consort Namyang, of the Namyang Hong clan (남양부부인 남양 홍씨)
King Jungjong (중종대왕)
Yun Sam-san (윤삼산)
Yun Ho, Internal Prince Yeongwon (영원부원군 윤호)
Lady, of the Goseong Yi clan (고성 이씨)
Queen Jeonghyeon, of the Papyeong Yun clan (정현왕후 파평 윤씨)
Jeon Jwa-myeong (전좌명)
Internal Princess Consort Yeonan, of the Damyang Jeon clan (연안부부인 담양 전씨)
Lady, of the Jeonju Yi clan (전주 이씨)
King Injong
Yun Sa-yun (윤사윤)
Yun Bo (윤보)
Lady, of the Suwon Choe clan (수원 최씨)
Yun Yeo-pil, Internal Prince Pawon (파원부원군 윤여필)
Yi Jeong, Prince Yeongcheon (영천군 이정)
Lady, of the Jeonju Yi clan (전주 이씨)
Lady, of the Yecheon Gwon clan (예천 권씨)
Queen Janggyeong, of the Papyeong Yun clan (장경왕후 파평 윤씨)
Park Geo-so (박거소)
Park Jung-seon (박중선)
Lady, of the Cheongsong Shim clan (청송 심씨)
Internal Princess Consort Suncheon, of the Suncheon Park clan (순천부부인 순천 박씨)
Heo Gyun (허균)
Lady, of the Yangcheon Heo clan (양천 허씨)

== In popular culture ==
- Portrayed by Jung Tae-woo in the 2001–2002 SBS TV series Ladies in the Palace.
- Portrayed by Kim Young-jae in the 2008 KBS2 TV series Hometown Legends.
- Portrayed by Lim Seul-ong in the 2013 KBS2 TV series The Fugitive of Joseon.
- Portrayed by Noh Young-hak in the 2017 SBS TV series Saimdang, Memoir of Colors.

== See also ==
- History of Korea
- List of monarchs of Korea
- Styles and titles in Joseon

== Notes ==
Injong of Joseon House of Yi Born: 20 March 1515 Died: 17 August 1545
Royal titles
Preceded by Jungjong	King of Joseon; 8 December 1544 – 17 August 1545	Succeeded by Myeongjong
