= Kim Allo =

Korean scholar-official (1481–1537)

Kim Allo 김안로

Left State Councillor
- In office 27 April 1535 – 26 November 1537
- Preceded by: Kim Kŭnsa
- Succeeded by: Yun Ŭnbo

Right State Councillor
- In office 25 December 1534 – 27 April 1535
- Preceded by: Kim Kŭnsa
- Succeeded by: Yun Ŭnbo

Personal details
- Born: 1481 Hanseong, Joseon
- Died: 27 October 1537 (aged 55–56)

Korean name
- Hangul: 김안로
- Hanja: 金安老
- RR: Gim Anro
- MR: Kim Allo

Art name
- Hangul: 희락당, 용천, 퇴재
- Hanja: 希樂堂, 龍泉, 退齋
- RR: Huirakdang, Yongcheon, Toejae
- MR: Hŭiraktang, Yongch'ŏn, T'oejae

Courtesy name
- Hangul: 이숙
- Hanja: 頤叔
- RR: Isuk
- MR: Isuk

Kim Allo (Korean: 김안로; 1481 – 27 October 1537) was a Korean politician and scholar of the Joseon period. His art names were Hŭiraktang, Yongch'ŏn, and T'oejae, and his courtesy name was Isuk. He was from the Yonan Kim clan.

== Family ==
- Father
  - Kim Hŭn (김흔; 金訢; 1448–1492)
- Mother
  - Lady Yun of the Papyeong Yun clan (파평 윤씨; 1452–1519)
- Siblings
  - Older sister - Lady Kim of the Yonan Kim clan (연안 김씨; 1469–?)
  - Older sister - Lady Kim of the Yonan Kim clan (연안 김씨; 1474–?)
  - Older brother - Kim An-jŏng (김안정; 金安鼎; 1476–1533)
  - Older brother - Kim An-se (김안세; 金安世; 1477–1518)
  - Older sister - Lady Kim of the Yonan Kim clan (연안 김씨; 1480–?)
- Wife and children
  - Lady Ch'ae of the Incheon Ch'ae clan (정경부인 인천 채씨; 貞敬夫人 仁川 蔡氏; 1484–?); daughter of Ch'ae Su (채수; 蔡壽; 25 August 1449 – 12 December 1515)
    - Son - Kim Ki (김기; 金祺; 1505–?)
    - Son - Kim Hŭi (김희; 金禧; 1508–1531)
      - Daughter-in-law - Yi Ok-ha (이옥하; 李玉荷), Princess Hyohye (효혜공주; 13 June 1511 – 6 May 1531)
    - Son - Kim Hwi (김휘; 金徽; 1517–1606)
