= Geunjeongjeon =

Hall in Gyeongbokgung, Seoul, South Korea

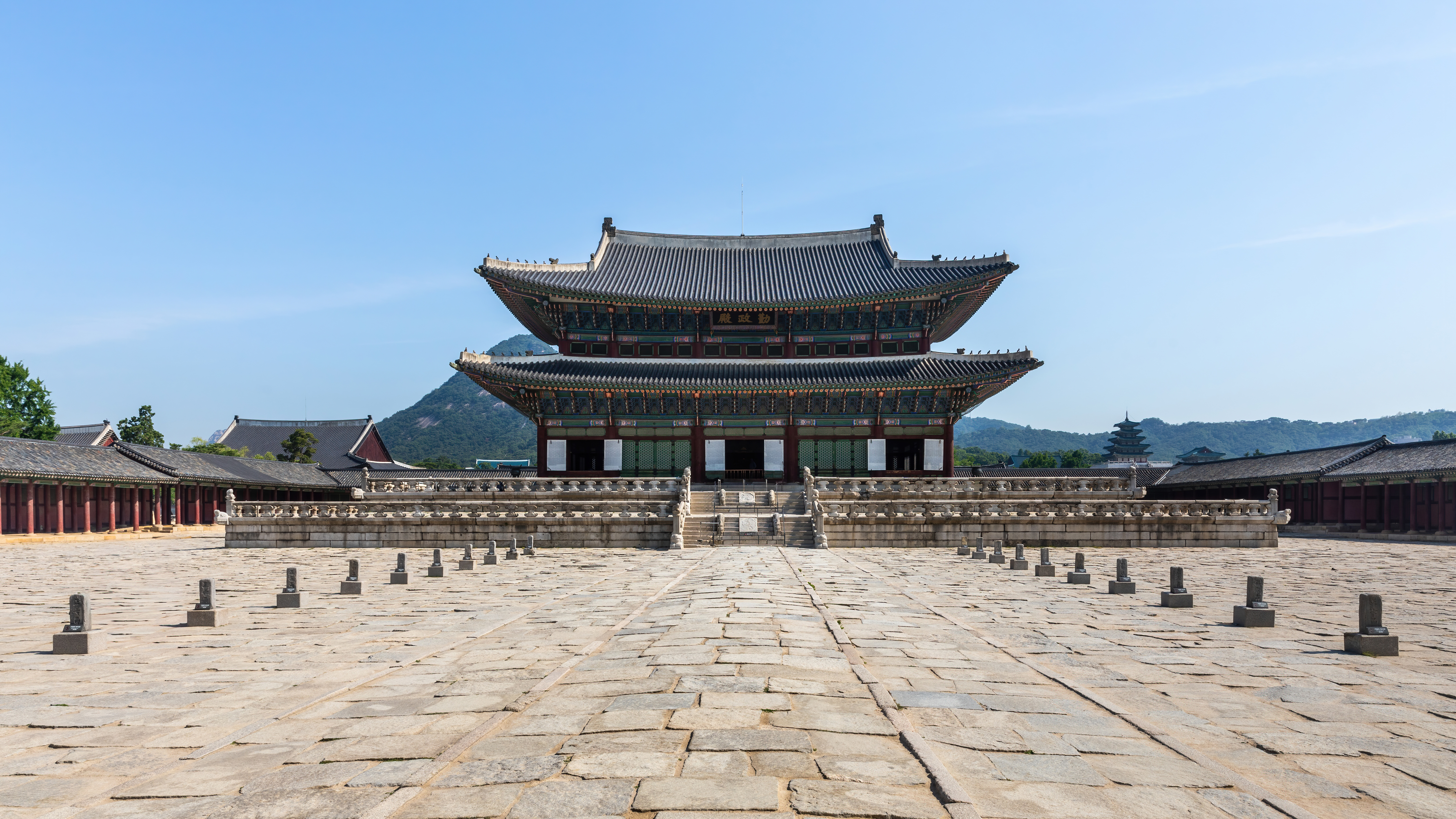
- The building (2024)
- Interactive map of the Geunjeongjeon area

General information
- Coordinates: 37°34′43″N 126°58′37″E

Design and construction
- Designations

National Treasure (South Korea)
- Official name: Geunjeongjeon Hall of Gyeongbokgung Palace
- Designated: 1985-01-08

Korean name
- Hangul: 근정전
- Hanja: 勤政殿
- RR: Geunjeongjeon
- MR: Kŭnjŏngjŏn

Geunjeongjeon (Korean: 근정전; Hanja: 勤政殿; lit. 'Governing Diligently Hall') is the main hall of the palace Gyeongbokgung in Seoul, South Korea. It was used for major events like ceremonies and the issuing of edicts. It is a designated National Treasure of South Korea.

== Description ==
It is the largest main hall of all Joseon palaces and is regarded as exemplary of late-Joseon architecture. Like other Joseon main halls, it has a wŏltae in front used for ceremonies. On its wŏltae are rank stones (품계석; 品階石; p'umgyesŏk) that mark where officials of various ranks are to stand during ceremonies. To its east and west are gates to its various annex buildings.

== History ==
The building was completed in 1395. Five kings were crowned here: Jeongjong in 1398, Sejong in 1418, Danjong in 1455, Jungjong in 1506, and Seonjo in 1567. It was renovated in 1426. It was spared by the 1553 fire that destroyed much of the palace. There are few records of renovations performed on it, so it is assumed that the building remained in much the same state until it was destroyed in 1592 in the Imjin War.

It was reconstructed from the 9th month of 1866 to 1867, possibly with inspiration from the design of Changdeokgung's main hall Injeongjeon, and has remained in much the same form to the present. In 1915, the building hosted the opening and closing ceremonies of the Chōsen Industrial Exhibition. Japanese Prince Kan'in Kotohito was in attendance at the opening ceremony; he sat on the former Korean throne. It was also used for the 1923 Chōsen Agricultural Exhibition and 1929 Chōsen Exhibition as an exhibition hall. Beginning in 1926, the building was used for an annual Shinto ceremony to honor deceased Japanese police who died while suppressing the Korean independence movement. The Seoul Historiography Institute described this as an intentionally symbolic act: turning the former seat of Joseon's power into the "Yasukuni Shrine of Chōsen". When ceremonies were held in the building during the colonial period, the Governors-General of Chōsen would symbolically sit on the Korean throne. The building became hidden from view in the front when the massive Government-General of Chōsen Building was completed in front of it.

After the 1945 liberation of Korea from Japanese colonial rule, the building was not properly maintained for several years and became overgrown with weeds.

The building was restored from January 2000 to October 2003.

== Gallery ==
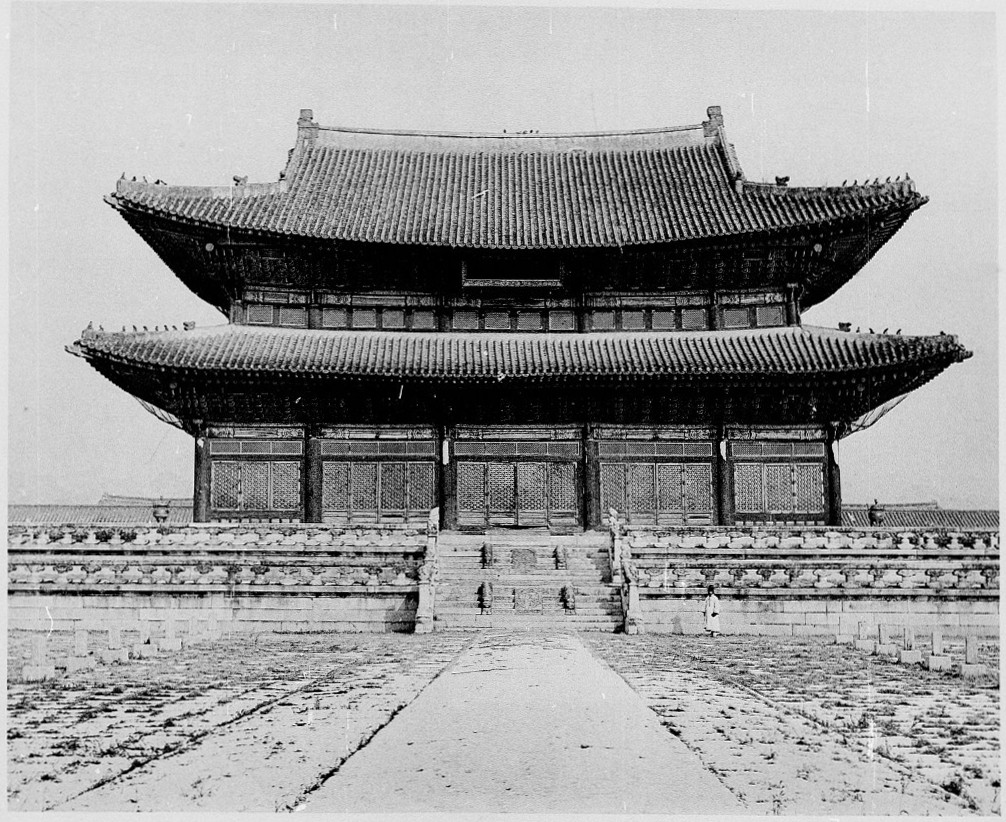
Geunjeongjeon (1900)

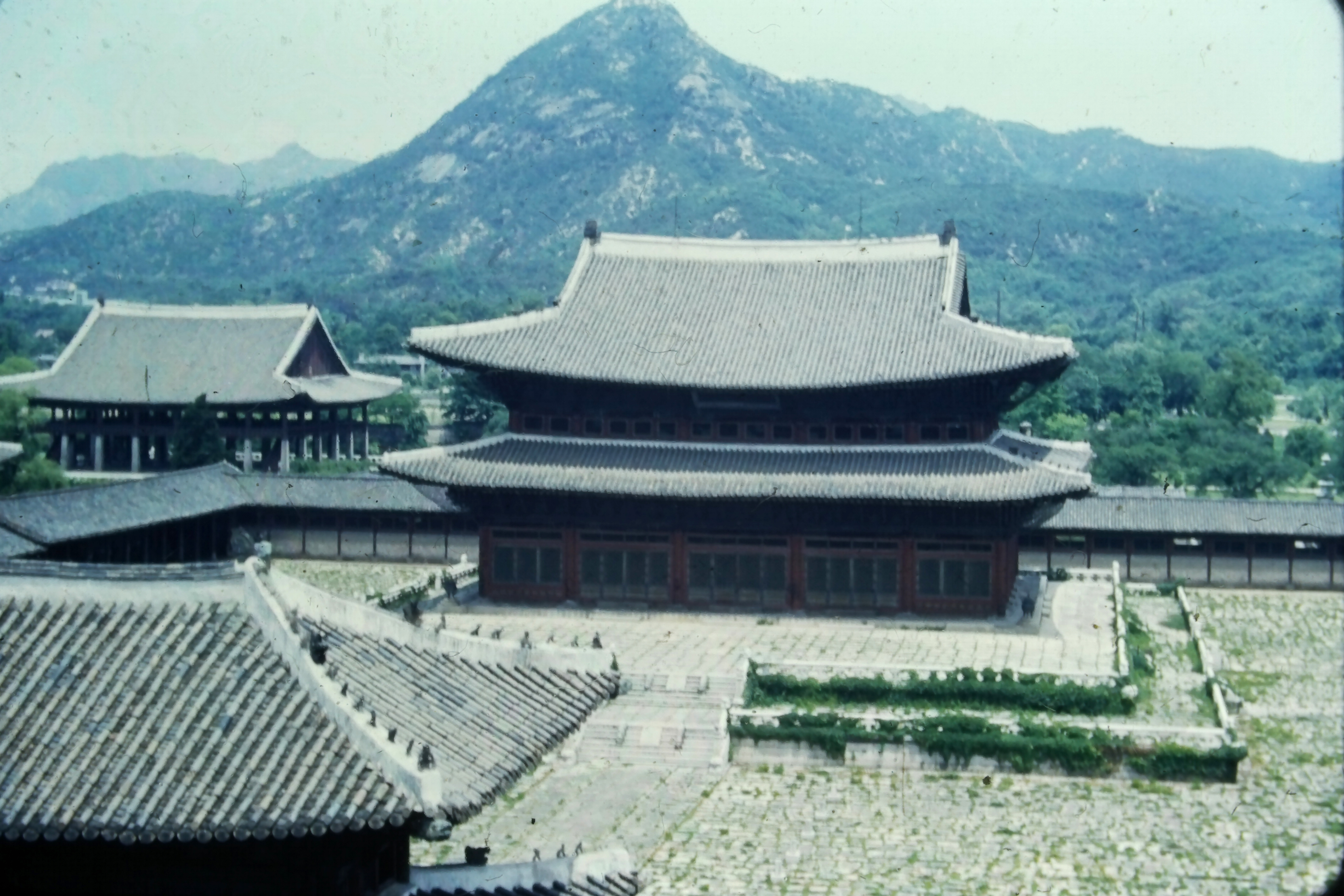
Geunjeongjeon (1955)

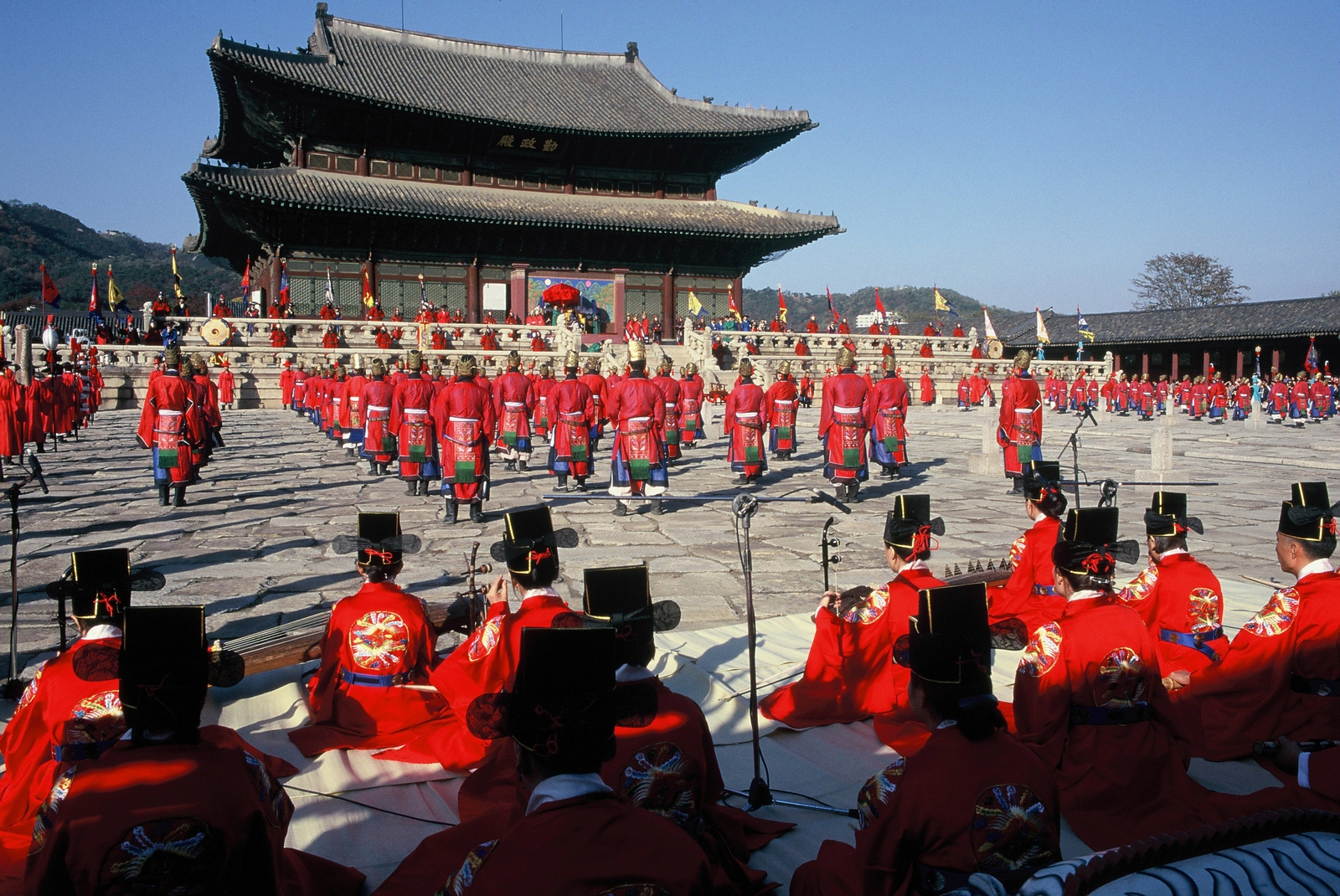
Reenactment of Sejong the Great's coronation at the building (1999)

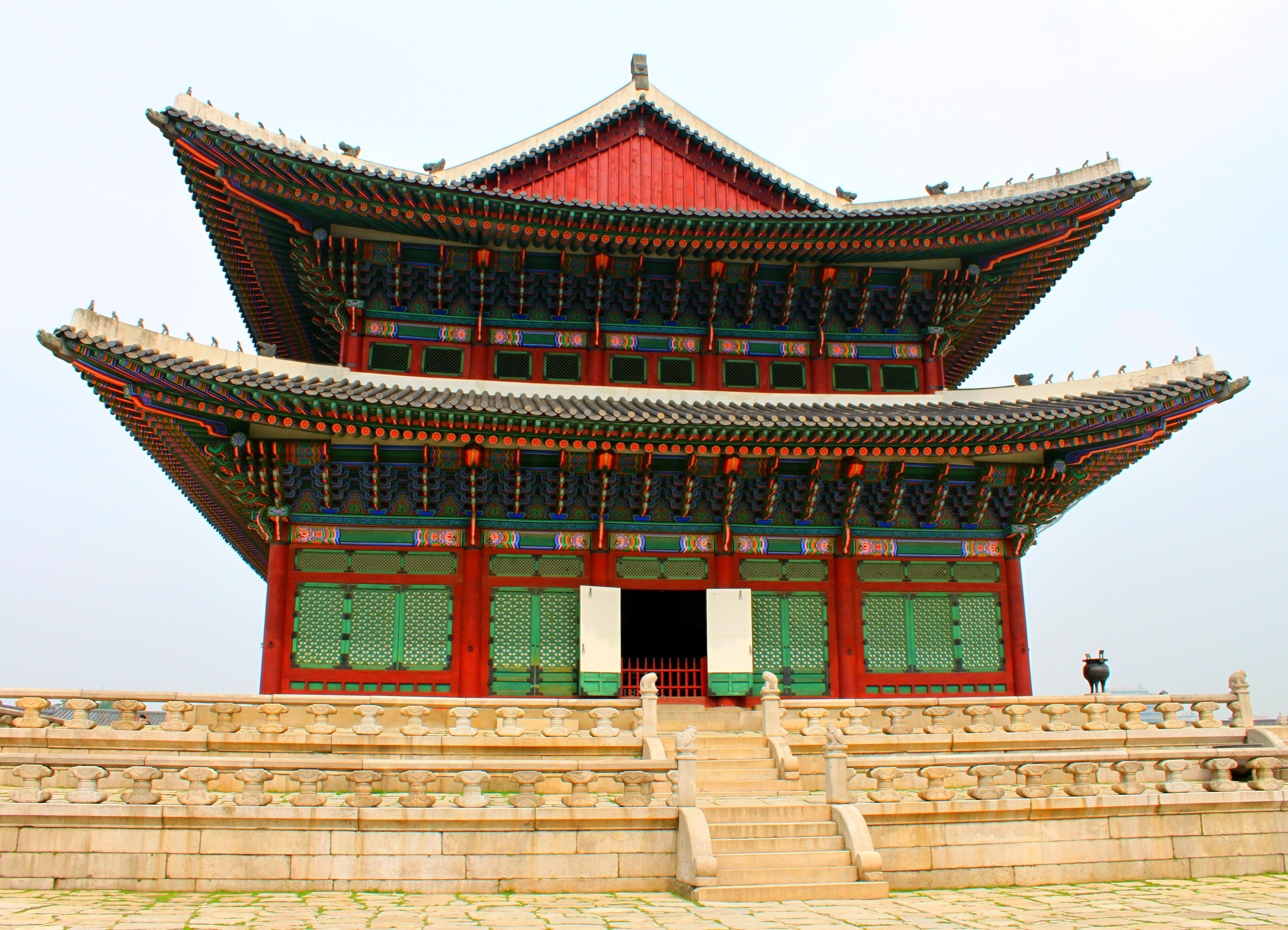
Geunjeongjeon (2009)

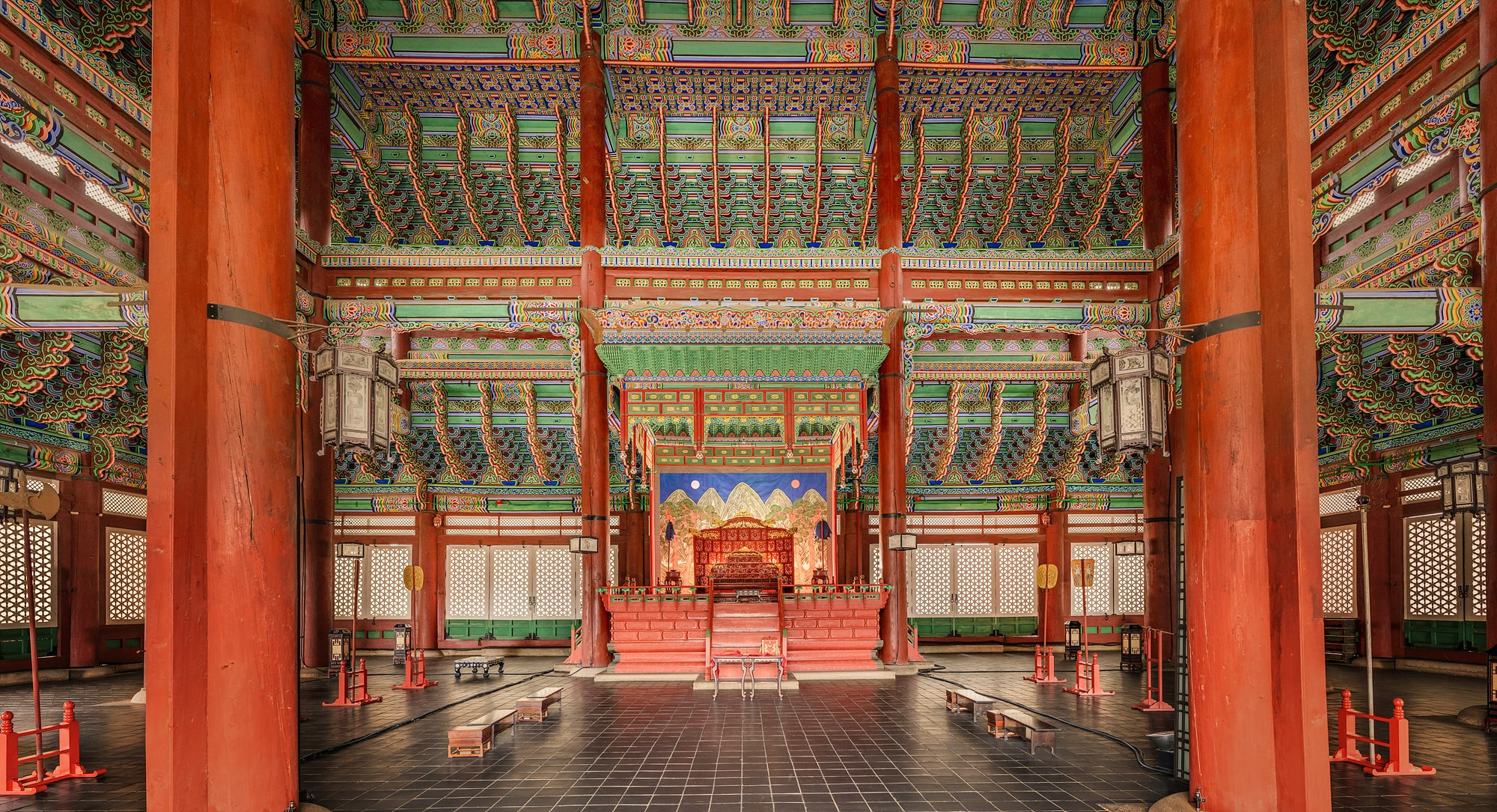
The interior, with the Phoenix Throne visible
