= Yun Im =

Korean general and politician (1487–1545)

Yun Im (Korean: 윤임; Hanja: 尹任; 26 July 1487 – 30 August 1545) was a politician, general, and soldier of the Korean Joseon Dynasty. He was from the aristocratic family of the Papyeong Yun clan, and related to the Royal Jeonju Yi clan through his mother. He was the older brother of Queen Janggyeong. He was also known as part of DaeYun (Great Yun) versus SoYun (small Yun) close relatives of the DaeYun (allied closely by marriage to Queen Munjeong).

He was executed in the Eulsa Sahwa of 1545 during the conflict of the Daeyun and SoYun factions. (See also Yangjae Station Graffiti Incident of 1547)

== Family ==
- Father − Yun Yeo-Pil (1466–1555)
- Mother − Internal Princess Consort Suncheon of the Suncheon Park clan (? – 1498)
- Aunt − Grand Internal Princess Consort Seungpyeong of the Suncheon Park clan (1455 – 1506)

Siblings

- Older sister − Lady/Princess Papyeong of the Papyeong Yun clan (1485 – 1536)
- Older sister − Princess Consort Papyeong of the Papyeong Yun clan
- Younger sister − Yun Cheon-deok, Lady Yun of the Papyeong Yun clan (1488 – ?)
- Younger sister - Yun Myeong-hye, Queen Janggyeong of the Papyeong Yun clan (1491 – 1515)
- Younger sister − Lady Yun (1498 – ?)
- Younger half-sister − Yun Ok-chun (1518 – ?)

Wives and their children

- Lady Yi of the Yeoju Yi clan (? – 1528); daughter of Yi Bo
  - Son - Yun Heung-in (1516 – 1545)
  - Son - Yun Heung-ui (1519 – ?)
  - Daughter - Lady Yun (1521 – ?)
  - Son - Yun Heung-rye (1524 – ?)
  - Daughter - Lady Yun (1526 – ?)
- Lady Gwak of the Hyeonpung Gwak clan (1517–1589); Gwak Han
  - Son - Yun Heung-ji (1536 – ?)
    - Daughter-in-law - Lady Park
  - Son - Yun Heung-shin (? – 1592)
    - Daughter-in-law - Lady Shin
  - Son - Yun Heung-chung
    - Daughter-in-law - Lady Lee

Concubines and their children

- Kim Ok
  - Son - Yun Heung-hyo (1538 – ?)
- Kisaeng Mae-hyang
  - Son - Yun Heung-je (1540 – 1592)
- Jong-i; slave of Prince Deokpung
- Deoknam; slave
  - Daughter - Lady Yun (1543 – ?)

== See also ==
- Eulsa massacre
- Queen Janggyeong
