= Myeongjong of Joseon =

King of Joseon from 1545 to 1567

Myeongjong

King of Joseon
- Reign: 17 August 1545 – 12 August 1567
- Enthronement: 22 August 1545; Geunjeongjeon, Gyeongbokgung
- Predecessor: Injong
- Successor: Seonjo
- Regent: Grand Queen Dowager Seongryeol (1545–1553)
- Born: 13 July 1534; Gyeongbokgung, Hanseong, Joseon
- Died: 12 August 1567 (aged 33); Yangsimdang, Gyeongbokgung, Hanseong, Joseon
- Burial: Gangneung, Seoul, South Korea
- Spouse: Queen Insun (m. 1543)
- Issue Detail: Crown Prince Sunhoe; Seonjo of Joseon (adopted)
Names
- Yi Hwan (이환; 李峘)
Era dates
- Adopted the era name of the Ming dynasty (Note: Gajeong (Jiajing) (가정; 嘉靖): 1545–1566 Yunggyeong (Longqing) (융경; 隆慶): 1567)
Posthumous name
- Joseon: Great King Gongheon Heonui Somun Gwangsuk Gyeonghyo (공헌헌의소문광숙경효대왕; 恭憲獻毅昭文光肅敬孝大王); Ming dynasty: Gongheon (공헌; 恭憲)
Temple name
- Myeongjong (명종; 明宗)
- Clan: Jeonju Yi
- Dynasty: Yi
- Father: King Jungjong
- Mother: Queen Munjeong
- Religion: Confucianism (Neo-Confucianism)

Korean name
- Hangul: 명종
- Hanja: 明宗
- Lit.: "Enlightened Ancestor"
- RR: Myeongjong
- MR: Myŏngjong

Royal title
- Hangul: 경원대군
- Hanja: 慶源大君
- RR: Gyeongwon daegun
- MR: Kyŏngwŏn taegun

Courtesy name
- Hangul: 대양
- Hanja: 對陽
- RR: Daeyang
- MR: Taeyang

Childhood name
- Hangul: 춘령
- Hanja: 椿齡
- RR: Chunryeong
- MR: Ch'ullyŏng

Myeongjong (Korean: 명종; Hanja: 明宗; 13 July 1534 – 12 August 1567), (Note: In the Korean calendar (lunisolar), he was born on the 22nd day of the 5th lunar month and died on the 6th day of the 7th lunar month.) personal name Yi Hwan, was the 13th monarch of Joseon. His father was King Jungjong and his mother was Queen Munjeong, the elder sister of Yun Won-hyeong. He acceded to the throne at the age of 11, upon the death of his childless half-brother, King Injong. Since he was too young to govern, his mother became regent.

== Biography ==
=== Political factions ===
There were two political factions at the time Myeongjong came to power; Greater Yun, headed by Yun Im, Injong's maternal uncle, and Lesser Yun, headed by Myeongjong's maternal uncles, Yun Wŏnhyŏng and Yun Wollo. (Yun Im and Yun Brothers were close relatives by that period's standards - Yun Im was a third cousin once removed of Yun Brothers.) Greater Yun took power in 1544, when Injong succeeded Jungjong; but they failed to wipe out their opposition, since Queen Munjeong protected the Lesser Yun faction and other opposition officials.

After the death of Injong in 1545, Lesser Yun replaced Greater Yun as the majority in the royal court and brutally ousted their adversaries in the Fourth Literati Purge of 1545. Yun Im was executed, as were many of his followers.

=== Rise of Yun Wŏnhyŏng ===
The Lesser Yun faction continued to attack their opposition. In 1546, Yun Wŏnhyŏng impeached his older brother, Yun Wollo, who was executed a few days later along with his followers. Facing no opposition from the government, Yun Wŏnhyŏng became Minister of Personnel 이조판서 in 1548, Left State Councilor in 1551 and ultimately Chief State Councilor 영의정 in 1563.

Despite Yun Wŏnhyŏng's violent rule, Queen Munjeong was an effective administrator, distributing to the common people land formerly owned by the nobility. However, she held on to rule even after the king reached his majority at the age of 20.

=== Death of Queen Munjeong ===
After the death of Queen Munjeong in 1565, the king decided to rule the kingdom by himself and had his uncle, Yun Wŏnhyŏng, put to death, along with his second wife Jeong Nan-jeong, who also rose to power due to her close friendship and being the second sister-in-law to Queen Munjeong. Yun Wŏnhyŏng allowed corruption to flourish in the government. And while the kingdom was unstable, Jurchens, Japanese, and rebellious troops rampaged at will and threatened the government itself. Rebel leader Im Kkeok-jeong was arrested and executed in 1552, but outside invasion continued; the Joseon Dynasty had to re-mobilize its army and navy along to protect its borders.

=== Death and succession ===
Myeongjong tried to reform the government after taking power into his own hands by recalling and reinstating Sarim scholars who were exiled in the purge, but died only two years later without any male issue. Yi Gyun, Prince Haseong (later known as Yi Yeon, Seonjo of Joseon), the son of his elder half-brother Grand Internal Prince Deokheung, was adopted by his wife, the now Queen Dowager Uiseong, to succeed the throne in 1567.

== Family ==
- Father: King Jungjong (중종대왕; 25 April 1488 – 9 December 1544)
  - Grandfather: King Seongjong (성종대왕; 28 August 1457 – 29 January 1494)
  - Grandmother: Queen Jeonghyeon (정현왕후), of the Papyeong Yun clan (파평 윤씨; 30 July 1462 – 23 September 1530)
- Mother: Queen Munjeong (문정왕후), of the Papyeong Yun clan (파평 윤씨; 12 December 1501 – 15 May 1565)
  - Grandfather: Yun Ji-im (윤지임), Internal Prince Pasan (파산부원군; 1475–1534)
  - Grandmother: Internal Princess Consort Jeonseong (전성부부인), of the Jeonui Yi clan (전의 이씨; 1475–1511)

Consort(s) and their respective issue

- Queen Insun (인순왕후), of the Cheongsong Shim clan (청송 심씨; 7 July 1532 – 22 February 1575)
  - Yi Bu (이부), Crown Prince Sunhoe (순회세자; 11 July 1551 – 16 October 1563), first son
  - Yi Yeon (이연), King Seonjo (선조대왕; 6 December 1552 – 16 March 1608), adopted son
- Concubine Gyeong (경빈), of the Jeonui Yi clan (전의 이씨; 1541–1595)
- Concubine Sun (순빈), of the Dongnae Jeong clan (동래 정씨; ?–1593)
- Gwiin (귀인), of the Geochang Shin clan (거창 신씨)
- Sugui (숙의), of the Pyongsan Shin clan (평산 신씨; 1533–1565)
- Sugui (숙의), of the Cheongju Han clan (청주 한씨; ?–1594)
- Sugui (숙의), of the Onyang Jeong clan (온양 정씨)

== Ancestry ==
Ancestors of Myeongjong of Joseon

King Sejo (세조대왕)
King Deokjong (덕종대왕)
Queen Jeonghui, of the Papyeong Yun clan (정희왕후 파평 윤씨)
King Seongjong (성종대왕)
Han Hwak, Internal Prince Seowon (서원부원군 한확)
Queen Sohye, of the Cheongju Han clan (소혜왕후 청주 한씨)
Internal Princess Consort Namyang, of the Namyang Hong clan (남양부부인 남양 홍씨)
King Jungjong (중종대왕)
Yun Sam-san (윤삼산)
Yun Ho, Internal Prince Yeongwon (영원부원군 윤호)
Lady, of the Goseong Yi clan (고성 이씨)
Queen Jeonghyeon, of the Papyeong Yun clan (정현왕후 파평 윤씨)
Jeon Jwa-myeong (전좌명)
Internal Princess Consort Yeonan, of the Damyang Jeon clan (연안부부인 담양 전씨)
Lady, of the Jeonju Yi clan (전주 이씨)
King Myeongjong
Yun Gye-gyeom (윤계겸)
Yun Uk (윤욱)
Lady, of the Gimhae Kim clan (김해 김씨)
Yun Ji-im, Internal Prince Pasan (파산부원군 윤지임)
Jeong Je (정제)
Lady, of the Yeonil Jeong clan (연일 정씨)
Queen Munjeong, of the Papyeong Yun clan (문정왕후 파평 윤씨)
Yi Sin-hyo (이신효)
Yi Deok-sung (이덕숭)
Lady, of the Seong clan (성씨)
Internal Princess Consort Jeonseong, of the Jeonui Yi clan (전성부부인 전의 이씨)
Hong Sun-seong (홍순성)
Lady, of the Namyang Hong clan (남양 홍씨)

== In popular culture ==
- Portrayed by Seo Dong-hyun in the 2013 KBS2 TV series The Fugitive of Joseon.
- Portrayed by Lee David in the 2016 JTBC TV series Mirror of the Witch.
- Portrayed by Seo Ha-joon in the 2016 MBC TV series The Flower in Prison.

== See also ==
- History of Korea
- List of monarchs of Korea
- Styles and titles in Joseon

== Notes ==
Myeongjong of Joseon House of Yi Born: 13 July 1534 Died: 12 August 1567
Royal titles
| Preceded by Injong | King of Joseon; 17 August 1545 – 12 August 1567 | Succeeded by Seonjo |
