= Sugui Shin =

Korean royal consort (fl. 15th century)

- Royal Consort of the Junior Second Rank
- Born: after 1440; Joseon
- Died: 16 June 1476; Joseon
- Consort of: King Deokjong
- Clan: Geochang Shin (by birth); Jeonju Yi (by marriage)
- Dynasty: Yi
- Father: Shin Seon-gyeong
- Mother: Lady, of the Cheongju Han clan

Korean name
- Hangul: 숙의 신씨
- Hanja: 淑儀 愼氏
- RR: Sugui Sinssi
- MR: Sugŭi Sinssi

Sugui Shin (Korean: 숙의 신씨; Hanja: 淑儀 愼氏; ? – 16 June 1476), of the Geochang Shin clan, was a consort of Crown Prince Uigyeong (King Deokjong), the eldest son of King Sejo.

== Biography ==
=== Early life and lineage ===
Lady Shin was most likely born during the reign of King Sejong, but the exact date and year of birth are unknown. Her father was Shin Seon-gyeong (신선경) and her mother was a lady from the prestigious Cheongju Han clan.

On her paternal side, Lady Shin was a second cousin of Deposed Queen Shin and a second cousin once removed of Queen Dangyeong, and on her maternal side, she was a fourth cousin once removed of Crown Prince Uigyeong's legitimate wife, Queen Insu, a fifth cousin of Queen Ansun, and a third cousin once removed of Queen Dangyeong, sharing Han Ak (한악) as their ancestor. Via Han Ak's grandson, Han Su (한수), she was also a third cousin of Queen Jangsun and Queen Gonghye. She was also a first cousin six times removed of Queen Inyeol via her maternal grandfather, Han Hye (한혜).

=== As royal consort ===
In 1456, she was selected as a consort of Crown Prince Uigyeong (then known as Crown Prince Chang) alongside Lady Gwon and Lady Yun, and was appointed as a consort of the crown prince of the junior fifth rank (소훈; sohun). The three women entered the palace that same year.

The crown prince died suddenly in 1457. When he was posthumously honored as king, Lady Shin was elevated to a royal consort of the junior second rank (숙의; sugui).

=== Death ===
Lady Shin died in 1476, having survived Crown Prince Uigyeong by 18 years. The location of her tomb remains unknown.

== Titles ==
- During the reign of King Sejong (r. 1418–1450):
  - Lady, of the Geochang Shin clan (거창 신씨; 居昌愼氏; from unknown date)
    - Shin Seon-gyeong's daughter (신선경의 딸)
    - Lady Shin (신씨; 愼氏)
- During the reign of King Sejo (r. 1455–1468):
  - Sohun (Note: lit. ''Lady of Clear Instruction'') (소훈; 昭訓; from 1456), consort of the crown prince of the junior fifth rank
- During the reign of King Seongjong (r. 1470–1495):
  - Sugui (Note: lit. ''Lady of Warm Deportment'') (숙의; 淑儀; from unknown date), royal consort of the junior second rank

== Family ==
- Father: Shin Seon-gyeong (신선경)
- Mother: Lady, of the Cheongju Han clan (청주 한씨)
- Consort of: King Deokjong (덕종대왕; 12 October 1438 – 29 September 1457) — No issue.

== Ancestry ==
Ancestors of Sugui Shin

Shin In-do (신인도)
Shin I-chung (신이충)
Shin Gi (신기)
Lady, of the Sunchang Seol clan (순창 설씨)
Shin Seon-gyeong (신선경)
Hong Eon-bak (홍언박)
Hong Sa-won (홍사원)
Lady, of the Andong Gwon clan (안동 권씨)
Lady, of the Namyang Hong clan (남양 홍씨)
Sugui Shin
Han Su (한수)
Han Sang-gyeong (한상경)
Lady, of the Andong Gwon clan (안동 권씨)
Han Hye (한혜)
Seong Dal-saeng (성달생)
Lady, of the Changnyeong Seong clan (창녕 성씨)
Lady, of the Cheongju Han clan (청주 한씨)
Yi Su (이수)
Lady, of the Seongju Yi clan (성주 이씨)

== See also ==
- Styles and titles in Joseon
- Society of Joseon
