= Naemyeongbu =

Hierarchy for palace women in Joseon

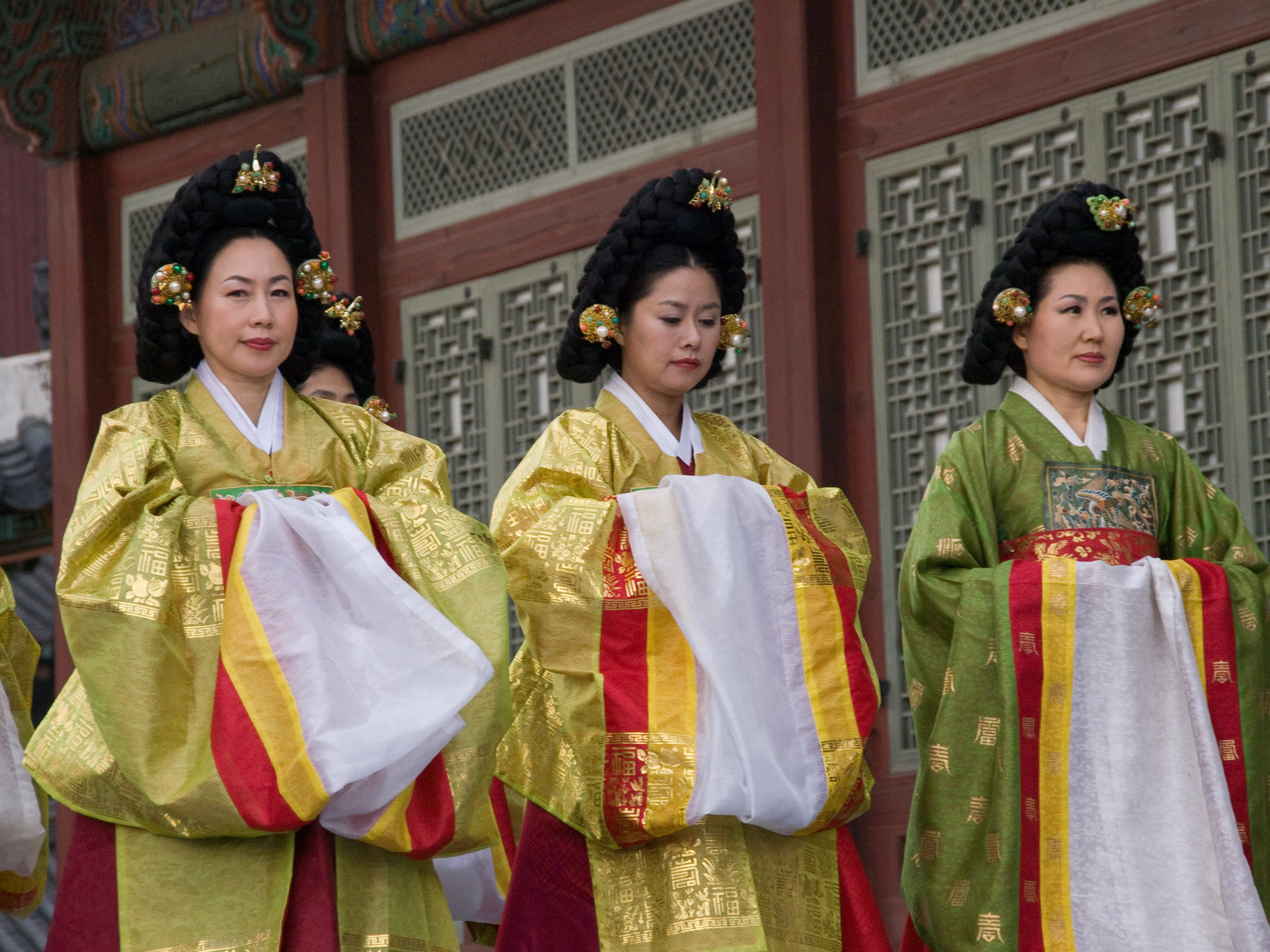
- Naemyŏngbu ladies in green wonsam and red chima during a historical reenactment

Korean name
- Hangul: 내명부
- Hanja: 內命婦
- RR: Naemyeongbu
- MR: Naemyŏngbu

Naemyeongbu (Korean: 내명부; Hanja: 內命婦; lit. ''Women of the Internal Court''), was a collective term that referred to royal women and female officials living within the palace during the Joseon period of dynastic Korea. It was separate from the Oemyeongbu (외명부; 外命婦; lit. ''Women of the Outer Court''), which encompassed the royal women living outside the palace, mothers or wives of meritorious subjects, and mothers or wives of officials.

== Definition ==
Although regulations concerning court ladies were introduced under King Taejo, detailed definitions of ranks, titles and duties were outlined in the State Code of Joseon promulgated under King Seongjong, where the term naemyeongbu appears.

Naemyeongbu comprised women serving and/or living within the palace, but excluded the queen and the queens dowager who were beyond rank and oversaw the court ladies. By contrast, gungnyeo refers to all court ladies below the senior fifth rank.

Within the naemyeongbu, the naegwan (내관; 內官; lit. ''internal official'') consisted of the royal consorts from the senior first rank to the junior fourth rank.

Court ladies from the senior fifth rank to the junior ninth rank were called gunggwan (궁관; 宮官; lit. ''palace official''), or alternatively yeogwan (여관; 女官; lit. ''female official''). They were responsible for various palace chores depending on their position and might work in the royal chambers, kitchen, laundry department, and so forth.

== Naegwan ==
=== Queens and crown princesses ===
==== Recruitment ====
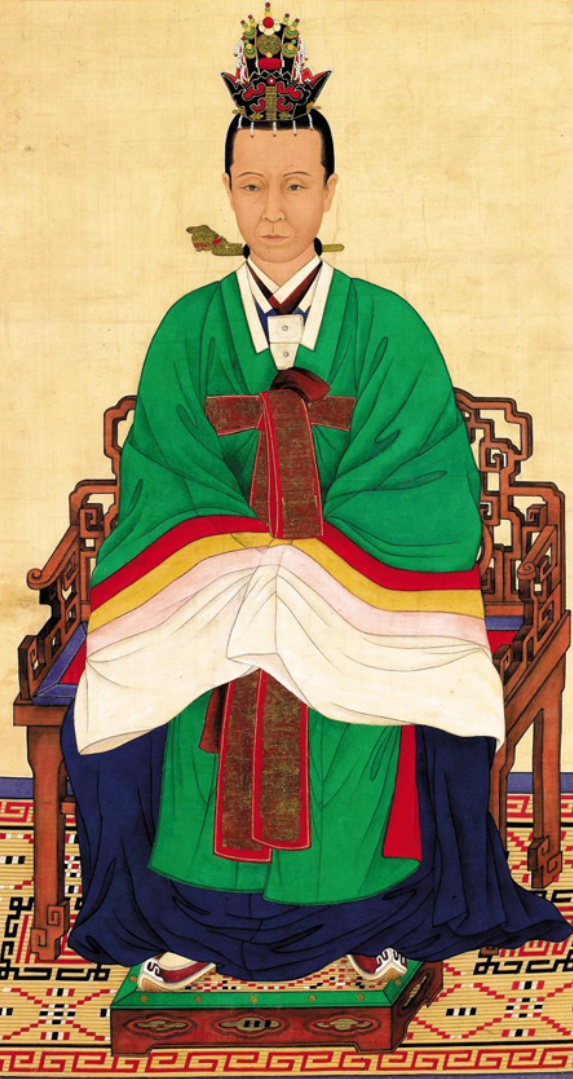
Queen Sinjeong was selected as the wife of Crown Prince Hyomyeong in 1819 and entered the palace at the age of 10

The legitimate wife of a king or crown prince during the Joseon period was selected through a specific procedure that differed from matchmaking practices common outside the royal family. The government issued a ban on marriages in aristocratic families throughout the country, indicating that unmarried daughters, usually between the ages of 12 and 15, were potential candidates. Depending on the age of the crown prince, girls as young as 9 were sometimes considered. A temporary department called the "Office of the Royal Wedding" (가례도감; 嘉禮都監) was established to manage all relevant tasks.

On announcement of the marriage ban, aristocratic families were required to submit details of their unmarried daughters' birth dates and times, as well as the family's genealogical records up to three generations. Candidates were required to be pleasant in appearance and virtuous in character. Those who were not considered physically attractive were disqualified, regardless of their family lineage or virtue. Five to six candidates were selected based on this, which was whittled down to two or three candidates in the second stage, with the bride-to-be selected during the third stage. This third stage was usually conducted in the presence of the king and/or queen dowager, who consulted the three state councilors before making the final decision.

Gifts of silk and jewelry were then sent to the bride's family, and the bride moved to a detached palace where she was instructed in palace etiquette before the formal investiture and marriage ceremony. A queen of Joseon would then receive formal recognition from the emperor of China acknowledging her legitimacy.

Despite the benefits of one's daughter being selected as queen or crown princess, aristocratic families were often reticent to marry their daughters into the royal family and quickly arranged marriages for their young daughters when a selection was anticipated.

=== Dowager queens ===
During the Joseon period, the hierarchy between dowager queens was determined by their kinship with the reigning king.

The queen dowager (왕대비; 王大妃; wangdaebi) was the widow of the previous king; she was usually, but not always, the mother of the reigning king.

The grand queen dowager (대왕대비; 大王大妃; daewangdaebi) was the most senior widowed queen; she was usually, but not always, the grandmother of the reigning king.

During the reign of King Cheoljong (r. 1849–1864), the position of daebi (대비; 大妃) was created for the most junior dowager queen due to the presence in the palace of the widows of three kings. It was held by two women: Queen Hyojeong (second wife of King Heonjong; during Cheoljong's reign) and Queen Cheorin (wife of King Cheoljong; during Gojong's reign).

Earlier, Queen Sohye (commonly known as Queen Insu) and Queen Ansun had shared the position of queen dowager during the reign of King Seongjong (r. 1470–1495; their biological and adopted son, respectively), and that of grand queen dowager during the reign of Seongjong's eldest son, Yeonsangun (r. 1495–1506). Nevertheless, Queen Sohye was considered superior to Queen Ansun as Queen Sohye's husband (Crown Prince Uigyeong) was the elder brother of King Yejong (Queen Ansun's husband) and their father-in-law, King Sejo, had entrusted Queen Sohye with the task of protecting King Yejong. Queen Inseong and Queen Insun also shared the position of queen dowager during the reign of King Seonjo (r. 1567–1608; their nephew-in-law and adopted son, respectively).

In the absence of a queen, the most senior dowager queen would serve as head of the internal court. However, even when the queen led the internal court, the dowager queens, as elders, were not subject to her authority. Instead they supervised her activities and ensured she was governing the palace ladies efficiently, with their influence being the chief challenge to the queen's hegemony.

=== Royal consorts ===
If the queen did not produce a male heir, similar formal procedures as those used to select the queen were followed to recruit royal consorts. Women thus selected entered the palace holding the junior second rank at the minimum. Royal consorts were sometimes selected from women up to the age of 20.

== Gunggwan ==
Court ladies of the senior fifth to junior ninth ranks were recruited through various processes depending on the role. They were originally selected from among government slaves or the daughters of gisaeng, but gradually daughters of respectable families (commoners of the sangmin and jungin castes) came to be recruited. To avoid their daughters being taken into the palace, many such families married off their daughters at very young ages, leading to a revision to the State Code according to which girls born into good families would not be recruited. However, Lee Bae-yong suggests that this rule probably only applied to court ladies of the lower ranks, whereas those working closely with the royal family potentially continued to be recruited from good families.

Girls were recruited between ages 4 to 10, and successful candidates were bound to live their entire lives in the palace. The young girls were trained in their duties and taught to write in the Korean vernacular script, as well as some Chinese characters. They began formally working around ages 11 to 12, with a coming-of-age ceremony held when they reached adulthood.

A woman only became eligible to hold the rank of sanggung (senior 5th) after 35 years of service. Both the head sanggung as well as the sanggung who personally attended the king and queen could hold tremendous influence and power during the tenures of their masters.

== Ranks ==
At the top was the queen dowager or in some instances the grand queen dowager. The queen was considered a junior to the dowager queen(s), but was the one who controlled the internal court. She was immediately followed by four ranks of official royal consorts, with two levels each: senior (정; jeong) and junior (종; jong).

For the rank of bin, the king or queen would attach a prefix in association with the character/personality of the royal consort, such as hui (splendid), suk (pure) or ui (proper).

Senior fifth rank sanggung and sangui were the court ladies who served directly under the royal family members, or headed various departments. Depending on their role and department, there would be internal ranking within the sanggung. For example, a sanggung who served the queen had higher authority and ranking than a sanggung who served a prince, princess, and/or royal consort.

A court lady who received the king's favor would become a "special court lady" (승은궁녀; 承恩宮女; seungeun gungnyeo); however, they would not be considered a member of the royal family or part of the naegwan. On some occasions, special court ladies would be promoted to royal consorts.

Selected royal consorts would start from the junior second rank. Favored royal consorts would start from the junior fourth rank.

Rank (Korean: 품계; Hanja: 品階)		Title			Duties
Classification	Hanja	Revised Romanization	Hangul	Hanja	Duties
Naegwan
—	—	Wangbi	왕비	王妃	Principal consort of the king.
—	—	Gyebi	계비	繼妃	Principal consort of the king from subsequent marriages.
—	—	(Wang)daebi	(왕)대비	(王)大妃	Principal consort of a deceased king who lived through one subsequent reign.
—	—	Daewangdaebi	대왕대비	大王大妃	Principal consort of a deceased king who lived through at least two subsequent reigns.
—	—	Wangsejabin	왕세자빈	王世子嬪	Principal consort of the heir apparent.
Senior 1st	정1품	Bin	빈	嬪	Royal consorts.
Junior 1st	종1품	Gwiin	귀인	貴人	Royal consorts.
Senior 2nd	정2품	Soui	소의	昭儀	Royal consorts.
Junior 2nd	종2품	Sugui	숙의	淑儀	Royal consorts.
Senior 3rd	정3품	Soyong	소용	昭容	Royal consorts.
Junior 3rd	종3품	Sugyong	숙용	淑容	Royal consorts.
Senior 4th	정4품	Sowon	소원	昭媛	Royal consorts.
Junior 4th	종4품	Sugwon	숙원	淑媛	Royal consorts.
Kunggwan
Senior 5th	정5품	Sanggung	상궁	尚宫	Personal attendants of the royal family; oversaw the sagi and jeoneon.
Senior 5th	정5품	Sangui	상의	尙儀	Responsible for all daily etiquette and procedures; oversawl saseol and jeondeung.
Junior 5th	종5품	Sangbok	상복	尙服	Supplied clothing and embroidered badges and wrappings; oversaw saui and jeonsik.
Junior 5th	종5품	Sangsik	상식	尙食	Prepared meals and side dishes; oversaw saseon and jeonyak.
Senior 6th	정6품	Sangchim	상침	尙寢	Responsible for the procedure of escorting the king to his chambers; oversaw saseol and jeondeung.
Senior 6th	정6품	Sanggong	상공	尙功	Managed the weaving and embroidery processes; oversaw saje and jeonchae.
Junior 6th	종6품	Sangjeong (Gungjeong)	상정 (궁정)	尙正 (宮正)	Oversaw the conduct, work, and punishment of the court ladies.
Junior 6th	종6품	Sanggi	사기	司記	Responsible for documents inside palaces and had access to account books.
Senior 7th	정7품	Jeonbin (Sabin)	전빈 (사빈)	典賓 (司賓)	Prepared meals for guests, looked after guests at banquets.
Senior 7th	정7품	Jeonui (Saui)	전의 (사의)	典衣 (司衣)	Responsible for the clothing and hair accessories of female officials.
Senior 7th	정7품	Jeonseon (Saseon)	전선 (사선)	典膳 (司膳)	Prepared boiled and seasoned side dishes.
Junior 7th	종7품	Jeonseol (Saseol)	전설 (사설)	典設 (司設)	Responsible for tents and rush mats, cleaning, and care of goods.
Junior 7th	종7품	Jeonje (Saje)	전제 (사제)	典製 (司製)	Responsible for clothing production.
Junior 7th	종7품	Jeoneon (Saeon)	전언 (사언)	典言 (司言)	Responsible for conveying messages between the king and the Internal Court.
Senior 8th	정8품	Jeonchan	전찬	典贊	Helped with meals and guidance during guest receptions and events.
Senior 8th	정8품	Jeonsik	전식	典飾	Responsible for washing, combing, and clothing maintenance.
Senior 8th	정8품	Jeonyak	전약	典藥	Responsible for prescribed medicine.
Junior 8th	종8품	Jeondeung	전등	典燈	Responsible for lights and candles.
Junior 8th	종8품	Jeonchae	전채	典彩	Wove silk and ramie cloth.
Junior 8th	종8품	Jeonjeong	전정	典正	Supported the gungjeong.
Senior 9th	정9품	Jugung	주궁	奏宮	Affairs related to music.
Senior 9th	정9품	Jusang	주상	奏商	Affairs related to music.
Senior 9th	정9품	Jugak	주각	奏角	Affairs related to music.
Junior 9th	종9품	Jubyeonchi	주변치	奏變徵	Affairs related to music.
Junior 9th	종9품	Juchi	주치	奏徵	Affairs related to music.
Junior 9th	종9품	Juu	주우	奏羽	Affairs related to music.
Junior 9th	종9품	Jubyeongung	주변궁	奏變宮	Affairs related to music.

== Notable Naemyŏngbu ==
=== Queens ===
The Cheongju Han clan produced six queens — Queen Sinui (first wife of King Taejo), Queen Jangsun (first wife of King Yejong and elder sister of Queen Gonghye), Queen Ansun (second wife of King Yejong), Queen Sohye (wife of Crown Prince Uigyeong/King Deokjong; commonly known as Queen Insu), Queen Gonghye (first wife of King Seongjong and younger sister of Queen Jangsun), and Queen Inyeol (first wife of King Injo) — the largest number in the history of Joseon. Among them, Queen Sinui died one year prior to Joseon's establishment, but was posthumously honored as queen by her son (King Jeongjong); Queen Jangsun died following childbirth complications while she was still crown princess, but was posthumously honored as queen by her husband's adopted son (King Seongjong); and Queen Sohye was widowed while she was still crown princess, but was honored as queen upon her husband's posthumous elevation to the position of king during the reign of their son (King Seongjong).

- Queen Sindeok (1356–1396), of the Goksan Kang clan — second wife of King Taejo
- Queen Wongyeong (1365–1420), of the Yeoheung Min clan — wife of King Taejong
- Queen Soheon (1395–1446), of the Cheongsong Shim clan — wife of King Sejong the Great
- Queen Jeonghui (1418–1483), of the Papyeong Yun clan — wife of King Sejo
- Deposed Queen Yun (1445–1482), of the Haman Yun clan — second wife of King Seongjong and biological mother of Yeonsangun
- Queen Munjeong (1501–1565), of the Papyeong Yun clan — third wife of King Jungjong
- Queen Inhyeon (1667–1701), of the Yeoheung Min clan — second wife of King Sukjong
- Queen Inwon (1687–1757), of the Gyeongju Kim clan — fourth wife of King Sukjong and adoptive mother of King Yeongjo
- Queen Jeongsun (1745–1805), of the Gyeongju Kim clan — second wife of King Yeongjo
- Queen Sunwon (1789–1857), of the (new) Andong Kim clan — wife of King Sunjo
- Empress Myeongseong (1851–1895), of the Yeoheung Min clan — wife of Emperor Gojong; also known as Queen Min

=== Crown princesses ===
- Deposed Crown Princess Kim, of the (old) Andong Kim clan — first wife of King Munjong
- Deposed Crown Princess Bong, of the Haeum Bong clan — second wife of King Munjong
- Crown Princess Minhoe (1611–1646) of the Geumcheon Kang clan — wife of Crown Prince Sohyeon
- Queen Heongyeong (1735–1816), of the Pungsan Hong clan — wife of Crown Prince Sado/King Jangjo; commonly known as Lady Hyegyeong
- Queen Sinjeong (1809–1890), of the Pungyang Jo clan — wife of Crown Prince Hyomyeong/King Munjo

=== Royal consorts ===
- Sukyong Jang (c. 1470–1506), of the Heungdeok Jang clan — courtesan and influential consort of the tyrannical Yeonsangun; commonly known by her personal name Jang Nok-su
- Gwiin Jo (1619–1652), of the Okcheon Jo clan — infamous consort of King Injo; commonly known by her lesser title Soyong Jo
- Huibin Jang / Concubine Hui (1659–1701), of the Indong Jang clan — biological mother of King Gyeongjong and key figure in the factional struggles during King Sukjong's reign; also known by her personal name Jang Ok-jeong
- Sukbin Choe / Concubine Suk (1670–1718), of the Haeju Choe clan — biological mother of King Yeongjo and supporter of Queen Inhyeon during her deposition
- Yeongbin Yi / Concubine Yeong (1696–1764), of the Jeonui Yi clan — biological mother of Crown Prince Sado
- Uibin Seong / Concubine Ui (1753–1786), of the Changnyeong Seong clan — beloved consort of King Jeongjo

== See also ==
- Mingfu
- Styles and titles in Joseon
- Society of Joseon
- Gungnyeo — umbrella term for women working in the royal palaces of Joseon
- Naehun — guidebook for women authored by Queen Insu and the first known book written by a female author in Korea
