= Consort Han =

Consort Han may refer to:

- Consort Han (Later Tang) (died after 936), consort of Li Cunxu (Emperor Zhuangzong of Later Tang)
- Empress Han (1165–1200), wife of Emperor Ningzong of Song
- Queen Sunjeong (died 1374?), wife of Gongmin of Goryeo
- Royal Consort Ik-Bi (died after 1390), wife of Gongmin of Goryeo
- Consort Han (Yongle) (died 1424), concubine of the Yongle Emperor
- Queen Jangsun (1445–1462), wife of Yejong of Joseon
- Queen Ansun (1445–1499), wife of Yejong of Joseon
- Queen Gonghye (1456–1474), wife of Seongjong of Joseon
- Queen Inyeol (1594–1636), wife of Injo of Joseon

== See also ==
- Queen Sinui (1337–1391), mother of Jeongjong and Taejong of Joseon, posthumously honored as a queen
- Queen Insu (1437–1504), mother of Seongjong of Joseon, posthumously honored as a queen
