= Deposed Queen Yun =

Queen of Joseon from 1476 to 1479

Queen Consort of Joseon
- Tenure: 5 September 1476 – 30 June 1479
- Investiture: Injeongjeon, Changdeokgung
- Predecessor: Queen Gonghye
- Successor: Queen Jeonghyeon
- Born: 24 July 1455; Hanseong, Joseon
- Died: 7 September 1482 (aged 27); Hanseong, Joseon
- Burial: Hoemyo, Seosamneung Cluster, Goyang, South Korea
- Spouse: King Seongjong (m. 1476–1479) (Note: Lady Yun had become Seongjong's consort more than three years prior to her elevation to the position of queen and legitimate wife.)
- Issue Detail: 3 sons
Posthumous name
- ~~Queen Jeheon~~ (제헌왕후; 齊獻王后) (Note: From 1504 to 1506.)
- Clan: Haman Yun (by birth); Jeonju Yi (by marriage)
- Dynasty: Yi
- Father: Yun Gi-gyeon, Internal Prince Haman
- Mother: Internal Princess Consort Jangheung, of the Goryeong Shin clan

Korean name
- Hangul: 폐비 윤씨
- Hanja: 廢妃 尹氏
- RR: Pyebi Yunssi
- MR: P'yebi Yunssi

Deposed Queen Yun (Korean: 폐비 윤씨; Hanja: 廢妃 尹氏; 24 July 1455 – 7 September 1482), of the Haman Yun clan, was the second wife of King Seongjong, the ninth monarch of Joseon, and the biological mother of the tyrannical Yeonsangun. Remembered as one of the most infamous women in Korean history, she was queen of Joseon from 1476 until her deposition in 1479. Her ousting and subsequent forced suicide by poisoning became a source of recurrent political turmoil, culminating in the Second Literati Purge.

== Biography ==
=== Early life and lineage ===
Lady Yun was born during the reign of King Sejo, as the only daughter and youngest child among four sons and one daughter. Her father was Yun Gi-gyeon (윤기견) and her mother was his second wife, a lady from the Goryeong Shin clan (고령 신씨). Three of her elder brothers were born to her father's first wife.

On her maternal side, she was a first cousin once removed of Shin Suk-ju, while her paternal Haman Yun clan, like the prolific Papyeong Yun clan (파평 윤씨) that produced Queen Jeonghui and Queen Jeonghyeon, traced its ancestry to the Goryeo general Yun Gwan.

=== Life in the palace ===
As Queen Han (posthumously Queen Gonghye), the first wife of King Seongjong, was physically weak and unable to become pregnant, concubines were brought into the palace.

In 1473, at the age of 18, Lady Yun was appointed as a royal consort of the junior second rank (숙의; sugui). The future Queen Jeonghyeon was selected alongside her, but as Lady Yun was older, she entered the palace earlier. She was favored by Seongjong, who was her junior by two years, due to her frugal and gentle demeanor, and gained the trust of the three dowager queens (Jaseong, Insu and Inhye). The following year, Queen Han died of illness. Once the mourning period ended, Lady Yun was chosen as the new queen and officially invested in 1476.

Several months later, she gave birth to Yi Yung (later known as Yeonsangun/Prince Yeonsan). She had already given birth to a son in 1474, but the child didn't survive infancy. There was also a third son who died soon after Lady Yun's deposition in 1479.

It is said that Lady Yun was the preferred choice for the position of queen because her father was already dead and her natal family had long since declined into obscurity and poverty, which meant there was no risk of powerful in-laws rising to prominence and disturbing the existing political balance; her pregnancy at a time when the king was childless and the succession unstable, as well as her seemingly simple personality, also played a role.

=== Downfall ===
In 1477, Grand Queen Dowager Jaseong issued an edict that ordered the discussion of Lady Yun's deposition. One of the triggers behind her action was the appearance of an anonymous letter at the residence of Gwiin Gwon (귀인 권씨), a consort of Seongjong's late father, Crown Prince Uigyeong; the letter claimed that Seongjong's two favored consorts, Sukyong Jeong (숙용 정씨) and Sukui Eom (숙의 엄씨), were planning to harm the queen and her son. The letter was submitted to the palace and it was subsequently revealed that the story had been fabricated at Lady Yun's instruction by her mother and palace ladies. Additionally, a book about shamanistic rituals, which described how to prevent pregnancy and cause paralysis, and dried persimmons coated in arsenic were discovered in Lady Yun's chambers. Using her moral failings as justification, King Seongjong summoned his officials to deliberate over Lady Yun's deposition and her demotion to a royal consort of the senior first rank (빈; bin), but the matter was abandoned due to the officials' strong resistance.

Nevertheless, the marital relationship had completely broken down. Lady Yun's disrespectful conduct and aggressive speech, such as describing to Seongjong how she wished to "gouge out those eyes, erase even [his] footprints, and cut off those arms" and telling palace maids who committed transgressions that "...even though I cannot punish you now, I will exterminate your entire family in the future", steeled Seongjong's resolve to depose her. The deposition edict was finally issued in 1479 with the support of Grand Queen Dowager Jaseong and Queen Dowager Insu. Although officials protested the decision on the grounds that Lady Yun was the crown prince's biological mother, Seongjong asserted his will by citing the precedent of Emperor Renzong of Northern Song and Empress Guo. Lady Yun was banished from the palace and Sugui Yun (posthumously Queen Jeonghyeon) became Seongjong's third wife in 1480. Yeonsangun, who was raised by the new Queen Yun, presumably grew up believing her to be his biological mother.

=== Death and aftermath ===
In 1482, King Seongjong order the execution of Lady Yun, stating that she continued to show no remorse for her sins. In all likelihood, Seongjong primarily sought to prevent the issue of her deposition from once again becoming the subject of public debate as the crown prince grew older.

Lady Yun was 27 years old at the time of her death. She was buried within Hoemyo (회묘), today part of the Seosamneung Cluster in Goyang, Gyeonggi Province. The tomb was originally situated in Jangdan County and was relocated a number of times, the last instance being in 1969. During Yeonsangun's reign, her tomb was elevated to Hoereung (회릉) and she briefly received the posthumous name Jeheon (제헌; lit. ''orderly dedication''), but both honors were revoked following the Jungjong Restoration.

Yeonsangun discovered his biological mother's fateful outcome after acceding to the throne and reading King Seongjong's epitaph. He eventually restored her title and position, and conferred posthumous honors upon her despite facing opposition from royal family members — such as Queen Dowager Insu, who died soon after clashing with Yeonsangun over this matter — and court officials. Furthermore, anyone remotely involved in Lady Yun's death was arrested, tortured and executed, and meritorious subjects, including Han Myeong-hoe, faced posthumous mutilation; ultimately, Lady Yun's death also served as Yeonsangun's pretext to cleanse the court of opponents and critics. This event came to be known as the Second Literati Purge and the misfortune suffered by the Hungu faction set the stage for the eventual coup d'état.

In the subsequent centuries, various rumors spread via unofficial histories, novels, and film/television; some purport Lady Yun had scratched King Seongjong's face in a fit of jealousy and later entrusted her mother to deliver the bloodstained skirt she wore during her execution to Yeonsangun, thus causing his descent into madness; others claim Lady Yun's downfall was actually orchestrated by Queen Dowager Insu conspiring with court officials and Seongjong's consorts. However, those rumors are contradicted by extant historical records (for instance, the Veritable Records of the Joseon Dynasty).

== Titles ==
- During the reign of King Sejo (r. 1455–1468):
  - Lady, of the Haman Yun clan (함안 윤씨; 咸安尹氏; from 24 July 1455)
    - Yun Gi-gyeon's daughter (윤기견의 딸)
    - Lady Yun (윤씨; 尹氏)
- During the reign of King Seongjong (r. 1470–1495):
  - Sugui (Note: lit. ''Lady of Warm Deportment'') (숙의; 淑儀; from 24 April 1473), royal consort of the junior second rank
  - Queen (왕비; 王妃; from 5 September 1476)
  - Commoner (서인; 庶人; from 30 June 1479)
- During the reign of Yeonsangun (r. 1495–1506):
  - Queen Jeheon (제헌왕후; 齊獻王后; from 1504)
- During the reign of King Jungjong (r. 1506–1544):
  - Commoner (서인; 庶人; from 1506)

== Family ==
- Father: Yun Gi-gyeon (윤기견), Internal Prince Haman (함안부원군)
- Stepmother: Lady, of the Yangseong Yi clan (양성 이씨) (Note: Daughter of Yi On (이온); Yun Gi-gyeon's first wife.)
- Mother: Internal Princess Consort Jangheung (장흥부부인), of the Goryeong Shin clan (고령 신씨; ?–1504)
- Sibling(s)
  - Yun U (윤우) (Note: Half-brother.)
  - Yun Hae (윤해)
  - Yun Hu (윤후)
  - Yun Gu (윤구; ?–1513) (Note: ▪︎Wife: Lady, of the Andong Gwon clan (안동 권씨). ▪︎Issue: 3 sons.)
- Husband: King Seongjong (성종대왕; 28 August 1457 – 29 January 1495)
  - Biological father-in-law: King Deokjong (덕종대왕; 12 October 1438 – 29 September 1457)
  - Adoptive father-in-law: King Yejong (예종대왕; 23 January 1450 – 9 January 1470)
  - Biological mother-in-law: Queen Sohye (소혜왕후), of the Cheongju Han clan (청주 한씨; 16 October 1437 – 21 May 1504)
  - Adoptive mother-in-law: Queen Ansun (안순왕후), of the Cheongju Han clan (청주 한씨; 27 April 1445 – 12 February 1499)
- Issue
  - Unnamed son (1474–1475) (Note: His childhood name was Hyo-shin (효신).)
  - Yi Yung (이융), Yeonsangun (연산군; 2 December 1476 – 30 November 1506)
  - Unnamed son (1479)

== Ancestry ==
Ancestors of Deposed Queen Yun

Yun Hui (윤희)
Yun Deuk-ryong (윤득룡)
Yun Eung (윤응)
Yun Gi-gyeon, Internal Prince Haman (함안부원군 윤기견)
Gwon Min-su (권민수)
Gwon So (권소)
Lady, of the Pungsan Kim clan (풍산 김씨)
Lady, of the Andong Gwon clan (안동 권씨)
Deposed Queen Yun
Shin Deok-rin (신덕린)
Shin Po-si (신포시)
Lady, of the Gwangju Jeong clan (광주 정씨)
Shin Pyeong (신평)
Kim Chung-han (김충한)
Lady, of the Gyeongju Kim clan (경주 김씨)
Internal Princess Consort Jangheung, of the Goryeong Shin clan (장흥부부인 고령 신씨)
Ma Yeong (마영)
Ma Cheon-mok (마천목)
Lady, of the Pyongsan Shin clan (평산 신씨)
Lady, of the Jangheung Ma clan (장흥 마씨)
Yi Bin (이빈)
Lady, of the Gyeongju Yi clan (경주 이씨)

== In popular culture ==
- Portrayed in the 1936 novel Blood On The Royal Sleeve by Park Chong-hwa.
- Portrayed by Lee Ki-seon in the 1984–1985 MBC TV series 500 Years of Joseon: The Ume Tree in the Midst of the Snow.
- Portrayed by Sunwoo Eun-sook in the 1987 film Prince Yeonsan.
- Portrayed by Kim Young-ae in the 1988 film Diary of King Yeonsan.
- Portrayed by Jang Seo-hee in the 1994 KBS2 TV series Han Myung Hoe.
- Portrayed by Kim Sung-ryung in the 1998–2000 KBS1 TV series The King and the Queen.
- Portrayed by Lee Joo-hee in the 2003–2004 MBC TV series Jewel in the Palace.
- Portrayed by Park Bo-young and Koo Hye-sun in the 2007–2008 SBS TV series The King and I.
- Portrayed by Jin Ji-hee and Jeon Hye-bin in the 2011–2012 JTBC TV series Insu, the Queen Mother.
- Portrayed by Kim Ji-young in the 2015 film The Treacherous.
- Portrayed by Woo Hee-jin in the 2017 KBS2 TV series Queen for Seven Days.
- Inspired a fictional queen portrayed by Lee Eun-jae in 2025 in the tvN TV series Bon Appétit, Your Majesty.

== See also ==
- Styles and titles in Joseon
- History of Korea
- Political factions of Joseon

== Notes ==
Deposed Queen Yun Haman Yun clan
Royal titles
Preceded by Queen Gonghye of the Cheongju Han	Queen Consort of Joseon; 1476–1479	Succeeded by Queen Jeonghyeon of the Papyeong Yun clan
