= List of Joseon royal consorts =

The following is a list of queens, queens dowager and grand queens dowager of Joseon, and empresses and empresses dowager of the Korean Empire.

== Title ==
Joseon (also transcribed as Chosŏn or Chosun; 대조선국; 大朝鮮國; lit. ''Great Joseon State'') was a Korean dynastic kingdom that lasted for five centuries. The Joseon king accepted Chinese suzerainty and acknowledged the Chinese emperor as their nominal overlord until the Kabo Reform in December 1894. The wife of the Joseon king bore the title wangbi (왕비; 王妃), (Note: 王 (King) + 妃 (Consort)) translated as "queen". The title used in the court language was junggungjeon (중궁전; 中宮殿) or jungjeon (중전; 中殿), translated as "central/middle palace". Wanghu (왕후; 王后), the title for the wife of a king during the pre-Joseon era, became a posthumous title.

The title of daewangbi (왕대비; 王大妃), (Note: 王 (King) + 大 (Great) + 妃 (Consort)) translated as "queen dowager", was given to the widow of a king. Daebi (대비; 大妃), (Note: 大 (Great) + 妃 (Consort)) was originally was the short form of wangdaebi, but it became a lesser rank title during the reign of King Cheoljong. The widow of a king who lived through at least two subsequent reigns was called the daewangdaebi (대왕대비; 大王大妃), (Note: 大 (Great) + 王 (King) + 大 (Great) + 妃 (Consort)) translated as "grand queen dowager".

After the Kabo Reform in December 1894, which proclaimed the severance of the subordinate relationship with China, royal titles also changed. The title changed from wangbi to wanghu and from wangdaebi to wangtaehu (왕태후; 王太后). (Note: In Eastern Asia royalti, both 妃 and 后 was used for parts of titles and are translated as "consort" in English. 后 was usually used by the wife of the monarch, while 妃 had lesser rank than 后.)

In October 1897, King Gojong proclaimed Korea as an empire and assumed the title of emperor (황제; 皇帝; hwangje) in order to assert Korea's independence. Automatically, his wife held the title of empress (황후; 皇后; hwanghu) (Note: 皇 (Imperial) + 后 (Consort)) and a monarch's widow held the title of empress dowager (황태후; 皇太后; hwangtaehu). Only Empress Sunjeonghyo held the rank of empress during her lifetime. The famous Empress Myeongseong died in 1895, two years before the Korean Empire was proclaimed.

== List ==
=== Queens and empresses ===
Joseon

King	Queen		Birth	Became queen	Ceased to be queen	Death
King	Posthumous name and maiden clan	Titles	Birth	Became queen	Ceased to be queen	Death
Yi Dan, King Taejo	Queen Sinui of the Cheongju Han clan	Queen Jeol (절비)	1337			21 October 1391
Yi Dan, King Taejo	Queen Sindeok of the Goksan Kang clan	Queen Hyeon (현비)	12 July 1356	17 July 1392	15 September 1396	
Yi Gyeong, King Jeongjong	Queen Jeongan of the Gyeongju Kim clan	Crown Princess Deok (덕빈); Queen Deok (덕비); Queen Dowager Sundeok (순덕왕대비)	22 January 1355	5 September 1398	28 November 1400 husband's abdication	2 August 1412
Yi Bang-won, King Taejong	Queen Wongyeong of the Yeoheung Min clan	Mistress Jeongnyeong (정녕옹주); Crown Princess Jeong (정세자빈); Queen Jeong (정비); Queen Dowager Hudeok (후덕왕대비)	29 July 1365	10 January 1401	9 September 1418 husband’s abdication	18 August 1420
Yi Do, King Sejong	Queen Soheon of the Cheongseong Shim clan	Mistress Gyeongsuk (경숙옹주); Crown Princess Gyeong (경빈); Queen Gong (공비)	12 October 1395	9 September 1418	19 April 1446	
Yi Hyang, King Munjong	Gwon Sun-im, Queen Hyeondeok of the Andong Gwon clan	Seunghwi (승휘); Yangwon (양원); Crown Princess (왕세자빈)	17 April 1418			10 August 1441
Yi Hong-wi, King Danjong	Queen Jeongsun of the Yeosan Song clan	Queen (왕비); Queen Dowager Uideok (의덕왕대비)	1440	1454	11 June 1455 husband's deposition	7 July 1521
Yi Yu, King Sejo	Queen Jeonghui of the Papyeong Yun clan	Grand Internal Princess Consort Nakrang (낙랑부대부인); Queen (왕비); Queen Dowager Jaseong (자성왕대비); Grand Queen Dowager Jaseong (자성대왕대비)	8 December 1418	1455	23 September 1468 husband's death	6 May 1483
Yi Hwang, King Yejong	Queen Jangsun of the Cheongju Han clan	Crown Princess (왕세자빈)	22 February 1445			5 January 1462
Yi Hwang, King Yejong	Queen Ansun of the Cheongju Han clan	Sohun (소훈); Queen (왕비); Queen Dowager Inhye (인혜왕대비); Grand Queen Dowager Inhye (인혜대왕대비)	18 April 1445	1468	31 December 1469 husband's death	3 February 1499
Yi Hyeol, King Seongjong	Han Song-yi, Queen Gonghye of the Cheongju Han clan	Princess Consort Cheonan (천안군부인); Queen (왕비)	8 November 1456	1469	30 April 1474	
Yi Hyeol, King Seongjong	Queen of the Haman Yun clan	Sugui (숙의); Queen (왕비); Deposed Queen (폐비)	15 July 1455	1476	1479 deposed	29 August 1482
Yi Hyeol, King Seongjong	Yun Chang-nyeon, Queen Jeonghyeon of the Papyeong Yun clan	Sugui (숙의); Queen (왕비); Queen Dowager Jasun (자순왕대비)	21 July 1462	1480	1494 husband's death	13 September 1530
Yi Yung, Prince Yeonsan	Queen of the Geochang Shin clan	Crown Princess (왕세자빈); Queen (왕비); Deposed Queen (폐비); Princess Consort Yeonsan (연산군부인); Princess Consort Geochang (거창군부인)	15 December 1476	1494	2 September 1506 husband's deposition	16 May 1537
Yi Yeok, King Jungjong	Queen Dangyeong of the Geochang Shin clan	Grand Princess Consort (부부인); Queen (왕비); Deposed Queen (폐비)	7 February 1487	18 September 1506	25 September 1506 deposed	27 December 1557
Yi Yeok, King Jungjong	Queen Janggyeong of the Papyeong Yun clan	Queen (왕비)	10 August 1491	1507	16 March 1515	
Yi Yeok, King Jungjong	Queen Munjeong of the Papyeong Yun clan	Queen (왕비); Queen Dowager Seongryeol (성렬왕대비); Grand Queen Dowager Seongryeol (성렬대왕대비)	2 December 1501	1517	29 November 1544 husband's death	5 May 1565
Yi Ho, King Injong	Queen Inseong of the Bannam Park clan	Queen (왕비); Queen Dowager Gongui (공의왕대비)	7 October 1514	1544	8 August 1545 husband's death	6 January 1578
Yi Hwan, King Myeongjong	Queen Insun of the Cheongsong Shim clan	Queen (왕비); Queen Dowager Uiseong (의성왕대비)	27 June 1532	1545	3 August 1567 husband's death	12 February 1575
Yi Yeon, King Seonjo	Queen Uiin of the Bannam Park clan	Queen (왕비)	5 May 1555	1569	5 August 1600	
Yi Yeon, King Seonjo	Queen Inmok of the Yeonan Kim clan	Queen (왕비); Queen Dowager Soseong (소성왕대비); Grand Queen Dowager Myeongryeol (명렬대왕대비)	15 December 1584	1602	16 March 1608	13 August 1632
Yi Hon, Prince Gwanghae	Queen of the Munhwa Yu clan	Princess Consort Munseong (문성군부인); Crown Princess (왕세자빈); Queen (왕비); Deposed Queen (폐비)	15 August 1576	1608	1623 husband's deposition	31 October 1623
Yi Jong, King Injo	Queen Inyeol of the Cheongju Han clan	Princess Consort Cheongseong (청성현부인); Queen (왕비)	16 August 1594	1623	16 January 1636	
Yi Jong, King Injo	Queen Jangnyeol of the Yangju Jo clan	Queen (왕비); Queen Dowager Jaui (자의왕대비); Grand Queen Dowager Jaui (자의대왕대비)	16 December 1624	December 1638	17 June 1649 husband's death	20 September 1688
Yi Ho, King Hyojong	Queen Inseon of the Deoksu Jang clan	Princess Consort Pungan (풍안부부인); Queen (왕비); Queen Dowager Hyosuk (효숙왕대비)	9 February 1619	1649	23 June 1659 husband's death	19 March 1674
Yi Yeon, King Hyeonjong	Queen Myeongseong of the Cheongpung Kim clan	Queen (왕비); Queen Dowager Hyeonryeol (현렬왕대비)	13 June 1642	1659	17 September 1674 husband's death	21 January 1684
Yi Sun, King Sukjong	Kim Ok-hye, Queen Ingyeong of the Gwangsan Kim clan	Crown Princess (왕세자빈); Queen (왕비)	25 October 1661	1674	16 December 1680	
Yi Sun, King Sukjong	Queen Inhyeon of the Yeoheung Min clan	Queen (왕비); Deposed Queen (폐비); Queen (왕비)	15 May 1667	1681	5 March 1688 deposed	
Yi Sun, King Sukjong	Queen Inhyeon of the Yeoheung Min clan	Queen (왕비); Deposed Queen (폐비); Queen (왕비)	15 May 1667	1694 reinstallation	16 September 1701	
Yi Sun, King Sukjong	Jang Ok-jeong, Queen of the Indong Jang clan	Sugwon (숙원); Soui (소의); Huibin (희빈); Queen (왕비); Huibin (희빈)	3 November 1659	1688	1694 deposed	9 November 1701
Yi Sun, King Sukjong	Queen Inwon of the Gyeongju Kim clan	Queen (왕비); Queen Dowager Hyesun (혜순왕대비); Grand Queen Dowager Hyesun (혜순대왕대비)	3 November 1687	1702	12 July 1720 husband's death	13 May 1757
Yi Yun, King Gyeongjong	Queen Danui of the Cheongsong Shim clan	Crown Princess (왕세자빈)	11 July 1686	20 May 1696	8 March 1718	
Yi Yun, King Gyeongjong	Queen Seonui of the Hamjong Eo clan	Queen (왕비); Queen Dowager Gyeongsun (경순왕대비)	14 December 1705	1720	11 October 1724 husband's death	12 August 1730
Yi Geum, King Yeongjo	Queen Jeongseong of the Daegu Seo clan	Princess Consort Dalseong (달성군부인); Queen (왕비)	12 January 1693	30 November 1724	3 April 1757	
Yi Geum, King Yeongjo	Queen Jeongsun of the Gyeongju Kim clan	Queen (왕비); Queen Dowager Yesun (예순왕대비); Grand Queen Dowager Yesun (예순대왕대비)	2 December 1745	1759	22 April 1776 husband's death	11 February 1805
Yi San, King Jeongjo	Queen Hyoui of the Cheongpung Kim clan	Grand Heiress Consort (왕세손빈); Queen (왕비); Queen dowager (왕대비)	5 January 1754	1776	18 August 1800 husband's death	10 April 1821
Yi Gong, King Sunjo	Queen Sunwon of the (new) Andong Kim clan	Queen (왕비); Queen Dowager Myeonggyeong (명경왕대비); Grand Queen Dowager Myeonggyeong (명경대왕대비)	8 June 1789	1802	13 December 1834 husband's death	21 September 1857
Yi Hwan, King Heonjong	Queen Hyohyeon of the (new) Andong Kim clan	Queen (왕비)	27 April 1828	1837	18 October 1843	
Yi Hwan, King Heonjong	Queen Hyojeong of the Namyang Hong clan	Queen (왕비); Queen Dowager Myeonghyeon (명헌대비); Royal Queen Dowager Myeongheon (명헌왕대비 → 명헌왕태후); Empress Dowager Myeongheon (명헌태후)	6 March 1831	1844	25 July 1849 husband's death	2 January 1904
Yi Byeon, King Cheoljong	Queen Cheorin of the (new) Andong Kim clan	Queen (왕비); Queen Dowager Myeongsun (명순대비)	27 April 1837	1851	16 January 1864 husband's death	12 June 1878
Yi Hui, Emperor/King Gojong	Min Ja-yeong, Empress Myeongseongtae of the Yeoheung Min clan	Queen (왕비 → 왕후)	17 November 1851	20 March 1866	8 October 1895	

Korean Empire

Emperor	Empress		Birth	Became empress	Ceased to be empress	Death
Emperor	Posthumous name and maiden clan	Titles	Birth	Became empress	Ceased to be empress	Death
Yi Cheok, Emperor Sunjong	Empress Sunmyeonghyo of the Yeoheung Min clan	Crown Princess (황태자비)	20 November 1872			5 November 1904
Yi Cheok, Emperor Sunjong	Yun Jeung-sun, Empress Sunjeonghyo of the Haepyeong Yun clan	Crown Princess (황태자비); Empress (황후); Queen Yi (이왕비); Queen Dowager Yi (이왕대비)	19 September 1894	20 July 1907	29 August 1910 husband's deposition	3 February 1966

=== Queens and empresses dowager ===
Joseon

King	Relationship with queen dowager	Queen dowager		Clan	Husband	Tenure	Death
King	Relationship with queen dowager	Honorific name	Posthumous name	Clan	Husband	Tenure	Death
Yi Bang-won, King Taejong	Wife of the king emeritus Sister-in-law	Queen Dowager Sundeok	Queen Jeongan	Gyeongju Kim	Yi Gyeong, King Jeongjong	28 November 1400 – 2 August 1412	2 August 1412
Yi Do, King Sejong	Wife of the king emeritus Biological mother	Queen Dowager Hudeok	Queen Wongyeong	Yeoheung Min	Yi Bang-won, King Taejong	9 September 1418 – 18 August 1420	18 August 1420
Yi Yu, King Sejo	Wife of the king emeritus Niece-in-law	Queen Dowager Uideok	Queen Jeongsun	Yeosan Song	Yi Hong-wi, King Danjong	1455 – 1457	7 July 1521
Yi Hwang, King Yejong	Widow of a previous king Biological mother	Queen Dowager Jaseong	Queen Jeonghui	Papyeong Yun	Yi Yu, King Sejo	1468 – 1469	6 May 1483
Yi Hyeol, King Seongjong	Widow of a previous king Adoptive mother	Queen Dowager Inhye	Queen Ansun	Cheongju Han	Yi Hwang, King Yejong	1469 – 1494	3 February 1499
Yi Hyeol, King Seongjong	Biological mother	Queen Dowager Insu	Queen Sohye	Cheongju Han	Yi Jang, Crown Prince Uigyeong	1474 – 1494	11 May 1504
Yi Yung, Prince Yeonsan	Widow of a previous king Adoptive mother	Queen Dowager Jasun	Queen Jeonghyeon	Papyeong Yun	Yi Hyeol, King Seongjong	1494 – 13 September 1530	13 September 1530
Yi Yeok, King Jungjong	Widow of a previous king Biological mother	Queen Dowager Jasun	Queen Jeonghyeon	Papyeong Yun	Yi Hyeol, King Seongjong	1494 – 13 September 1530	13 September 1530
Yi Ho, King Injong	Widow of a previous king Stepmother	None	Queen Munjeong	Papyeong Yun	Yi Yeok, King Jungjong	1544 – 1545	5 May 1565
Yi Hwan, King Myeongjong	Widow of a previous king Sister-in-law	Queen Dowager Gongui	Queen Inseong	Bannam Park	Yi Ho, King Injong	1545 – 6 January 1578	6 January 1578
Yi Yeon, King Seonjo	Widow of a previous king Aunt-in-law	Queen Dowager Gongui	Queen Inseong	Bannam Park	Yi Ho, King Injong	1545 – 6 January 1578	6 January 1578
Yi Yeon, King Seonjo	Widow of a previous king Adoptive mother	Queen Dowager Uiseong	Queen Insun	Cheongsong Shim	Yi Hwan, King Myeongjong	1567 – 12 February 1575	12 February 1575
Yi Hon, Prince Gwanghae	Widow of a previous king Stepmother	Queen Dowager Soseong	Queen Inmok	Yeonan Kim	Yi Yeon, King Seonjo	1608 – 1624	13 August 1632
Yi Ho, King Hyojong	Widow of a previous king Stepmother	Queen Dowager Jaui	Queen Jangnyeol	Yangju Jo	Yi Jong, King Injo	1649 – 1659	20 September 1688
Yi Yeon, King Hyeonjong	Widow of a previous king Biological mother	Queen Dowager Hyosuk	Queen Inseon	Deoksu Jang	Yi Ho, King Hyojong	1659 – 19 March 1674	19 March 1674
Yi Sun, King Sukjong	Widow of a previous king Biological mother	Queen Dowager Hyeonryeol	Queen Myeongseong	Cheongpung Kim	Yi Yeon, King Hyeonjong	1674 – 21 January 1684	21 January 1684
Yi Yun, King Gyeongjong	Widow of a previous king Stepmother	Queen Dowager Hyesun	Queen Inwon	Gyeongju Kim	Yi Sun, King Sukjong	1720 – 11 October 1724	11 October 1724
Yi Geum, King Yeongjo	Widow of a previous king Sister-in-law	Queen Dowager Gyeongsun	Queen Seonui	Hamjong Eo	Yi Yun, King Gyeongjong	1724 – 12 August 1730	12 August 1730
Yi San, King Jeongjo	Widow of a previous king Step-grandmother	Queen Dowager Yesun	Queen Jeongsun	Gyeongju Kim	Yi Geum, King Yeongjo	27 April 1776 – 18 August 1800	11 February 1805
Yi Gong, King Sunjo	Widow of a previous king Adoptive mother	None	Queen Hyoui	Cheongpung Kim	Yi San, King Jeongjo	18 August 1800 − 10 April 1821	10 April 1821
Yi Hwan, King Heonjong	Widow of a previous king Grandmother	Queen Dowager Myeonggyeong	Queen Sunwon	Andong Kim	Yi Gong, King Sunjo	1834	21 September 1857
Yi Hwan, King Heonjong	Biological mother	Queen Dowager Hyoyu	Queen Sinjeong	Pungyang Jo	Yi Yeong, Crown Prince Hyomyeong	1834 – 1857	4 June 1890
Yi Byeon, King Cheoljong	Legal sister-in-law	Queen Dowager Hyoyu	Queen Sinjeong	Pungyang Jo	Yi Yeong, Crown Prince Hyomyeong	1834 – 1857	4 June 1890
Yi Byeon, King Cheoljong	Widow of a previous king Legal niece-in-law	Queen Dowager Myeongheon	Queen Hyojeong	Namyang Hong	Yi Hwan, King Heonjong	25 July 1849 – 1857 (as daebi); 1857 – 13 October 1897 (as wangdaebi → wangtaehu)	2 January 1904
Yi Hui, King Gojong	Widow of a previous king Legal sister-in-law	Queen Dowager Myeongheon	Queen Hyojeong	Namyang Hong	Yi Hwan, King Heonjong	25 July 1849 – 1857 (as daebi); 1857 – 13 October 1897 (as wangdaebi → wangtaehu)	2 January 1904
Yi Hui, King Gojong	Widow of a previous king Legal aunt-in-law	Queen Dowager Myeongsun	Queen Cheorin	Andong Kim	Yi Byeon, King Cheoljong	1863 – 12 June 1878	12 June 1878

Korean Empire

Emperor	Relationship with empress dowager	Empress dowager		Clan	Husband	Tenure	Death
Emperor	Relationship with empress dowager	Honorific name	Posthumous name	Clan	Husband	Tenure	Death
Yi Hui, Emperor Sunjong	Widow of a previous king Legal aunt-in-law	Empress Dowager Myeongheon	Queen Hyojeong	Namyang Hong	Yi Hwan, King Heonjong	13 October 1897 – 2 January 1904	2 January 1904

=== Grand queens dowager ===
King	Relationship with grand queen dowager	Grand queen dowager		Clan	Husband	Tenure	Death
King	Relationship with grand queen dowager	Honorific name	Posthumous name	Clan	Husband	Tenure	Death
Yi Hyeol, King Seongjong	Widow of a previous king Grandmother	Grand Queen Dowager Jaseong	Queen Jeonghui	Papyeong Yun	Yi Yu, King Sejo	1469 – 6 May 1483	6 May 1483
Yi Yung, Prince Yeonsan	Widow of a previous king Adoptive grandmother	Grand Queen Dowager Inhye	Queen Ansun	Cheongju Han	Yi Hwang, King Yejong	1494 – 3 February 1499	3 February 1499
Yi Yung, Prince Yeonsan	Biological grandmother	Grand Queen Dowager Insu	Queen Sohye	Cheongju Han	Yi Jang, Crown Prince Uigyeong	1494 – 11 May 1504	11 May 1504
Yi Hwan, King Myeongjong	Widow of a previous king Biological mother	Grand Queen Dowager Seongryeol	Queen Munjeong	Papyeong Yun	Yi Yeok, King Jungjong	1545 – 5 May 1565	5 May 1565
Yi Jong, King Injo	Widow of a previous king Step-grandmother	Grand Queen Dowager Myeongryeol	Queen Inmok	Yeonan Kim	Yi Yeon, King Seonjo	1624 – 13 August 1632	13 August 1632
Yi Yeon, King Hyeonjong	Widow of a previous king Step-grandmother	Grand Queen Dowager Jaui	Queen Jangnyeol	Yangju Jo	Yi Jong, King Injo	1659 – 20 September 1688	20 September 1688
Yi Sun, King Sukjong	Widow of a previous king Step-great-grandmother	Grand Queen Dowager Jaui	Queen Jangnyeol	Yangju Jo	Yi Jong, King Injo	1659 – 20 September 1688	20 September 1688
Yi Geum, King Yeongjo	Widow of a previous king Adoptive mother	Grand Queen Dowager Hyesun	Queen Inwon	Gyeongju Kim	Yi Sun, King Sukjong	1724 – 13 May 1757	13 May 1757
Yi Gong, King Sunjo	Widow of a previous king Step-great-grandmother	Grand Queen Dowager Yesun	Queen Jeongsun	Gyeongju Kim	Yi Geum, King Yeongjo	18 August 1800 − 11 February 1805	11 February 1805
Yi Hwan, King Heonjong	Widow of a previous king Grandmother	Grand Queen Dowager Myeonggyeong	Queen Sunwon	Andong Kim	Yi Gong, King Sunjo	1834 − 21 September 1857	21 September 1857
Yi Byeon, King Cheoljong	Widow of a previous king Adoptive mother	Grand Queen Dowager Myeonggyeong	Queen Sunwon	Andong Kim	Yi Gong, King Sunjo	1834 − 21 September 1857	21 September 1857
Yi Byeon, King Cheoljong	Legal sister-in-law	Grand Queen Dowager Hyoyu	Queen Sinjeong	Pungyang Jo	Yi Yeong, Crown Prince Hyomyeong	21 September 1857 − 4 June 1890	4 June 1890
Yi Hui, King Gojong	Adoptive mother	Grand Queen Dowager Hyoyu	Queen Sinjeong	Pungyang Jo	Yi Yeong, Crown Prince Hyomyeong	21 September 1857 − 4 June 1890	4 June 1890

== See also ==
- List of monarchs of Korea
