= Queen Jeonghyeon =

Queen of Joseon from 1480 to 1495

Queen Dowager of Joseon
- Tenure: 29 January 1495 – 23 September 1530
- Predecessor: Queen Dowager Inhye; Queen Dowager Insu
- Successor: Queen Dowager Yun

Queen Consort of Joseon
- Tenure: 18 December 1480 – 29 January 1495
- Investiture: Seonjeongjeon, Changdeokgung
- Predecessor: Queen Yun
- Successor: Queen Shin
- Born: 30 July 1462; Sinchang-hyeon, Chungcheong Province, Joseon
- Died: 23 September 1530 (aged 68); Donggung, (Note: Korean: 동궁; Hanja: 東宮; lit. ''East Palace''; residence of the crown prince.) Gyeongbokgung, Hanseong, Joseon
- Burial: Seolleung, Seoul, South Korea
- Spouse: King Seongjong (m. 1480; died 1495) (Note: Lady Yun had become Seongjong's consort more than seven years prior to her elevation to the position of queen and legitimate wife.)
- Issue Detail: 2 sons (1 adopted son), 3 daughters
Names
- Yun Chang-nyeon (윤창년; 尹昌年)
Regnal name
- Jasun Hwahye (자순화혜; 慈順和惠) (Note: Known as honorific name (존호; 尊號) in the Sinosphere, its closest equivalent in the English-speaking world is the regnal name.)
Posthumous name
- Queen Soui Heumsuk Jeonghyeon (소의흠숙정현왕후; 昭懿欽淑貞顯王后)
- Clan: Papyeong Yun (by birth); Jeonju Yi (by marriage)
- Dynasty: Yi
- Father: Yun Ho, Internal Prince Yeongwon
- Mother: Internal Princess Consort Yeonan, of the Damyang Jeon clan
- Religion: Buddhism

Korean name
- Hangul: 정현왕후
- Hanja: 貞顯王后
- RR: Jeonghyeon wanghu
- MR: Chŏnghyŏn wanghu

Queen Jeonghyeon (Korean: 정현왕후; Hanja: 貞顯王后; 30 July 1462 – 23 September 1530), of the Papyeong Yun clan, personal name Yun Chang-nyeon, was the third wife of King Seongjong, the ninth monarch of Joseon, and the mother of King Jungjong. She was queen of Joseon from 1480 until her husband's death in 1495, and was then styled as Queen Dowager Jasun during the reign of her adopted son, the tyrannical Yeonsangun, and that of her son, King Jungjong. Originally a royal consort, she came to wield considerable influence in politics and the continued rise of her natal family laid the groundwork for the Fourth Literati Purge.

== Biography ==
=== Early life and lineage ===
The future Queen Jeonghyeon was born during the reign of King Sejo, as the only daughter and second child among two sons and one daughter. Her father was Yun Ho (윤호), a high-ranking official who would later become right state councilor, and her mother was a lady from the Damyang Jeon clan (담양 전씨). Born into a prestigious yangban family, Lady Yun is considered to have had a good upbringing, receiving education in both the Korean vernacular script and Chinese characters, and learning calligraphy. She was generally regarded as intelligent, courteous and kind.

On her paternal side, she was a second cousin once removed of Queen Jangsun and Queen Gonghye, a second cousin twice removed of Queen Jeonghui, a fourth cousin once removed of Queen Janggyeong and Yun Im, and a fourth cousin twice removed of Queen Munjeong and Yun Won-hyeong.

One of her second cousins was Chief State Councilor Yun Pil-sang (윤필상). Another second cousin, Yun Sa-ro (윤사로), married King Sejong's third daughter, Princess Jeonghyeon (정현옹주); their elder son married the second daughter of Han Myeong-hoe, while one of their granddaughters married Park Won-jong.

Furthermore, her 4th great-grandfater, Yun An-suk (윤안숙), was the uncle of Consort Hui, making Lady Yun a second cousin four times removed of King Chungjeong of Goryeo.

=== Life in the palace ===
When it became clear that Queen Han (posthumously Queen Gonghye), the first wife of King Seongjong, was unable to become pregnant due to her weak constitution, it was decided to bring concubines into the palace. In 1473, at the age of 11, Lady Yun was appointed as a royal consort of the junior second rank (숙의; sugui) under the patronage of Grand Queen Dowager Jaseong.

Queen Han died the following year, and Sugui Yun, who had been selected as a royal consort alongside Lady Yun, was invested as queen and gave birth to the heir to the throne (Yi Yung, later known as Yeonsangun/Prince Yeonsan) in 1476. However, the new queen soon proved to be jealous and temperamental, and Seongjong became determined to depose her; despite the officials' objections, the deposition edict was issued in 1479, and three years later, the former queen was ordered to commit suicide by poisoning.

In 1480, the 18-year-old Lady Yun became King Seongjong's third and last wife. Her prestigious background and familial connections with Grand Queen Dowager Jaseong, Queen Dowager Insu, and the kingmaker Han Myeong-hoe — and therefore with the Papyeong Yun clan and the Cheongju Han clan, which formed the backbone of the Hungu faction and had dominated the royal court since King Sejo's accession — as well as perhaps her lack of a son, were the major reasons behind her selection.

Lady Yun had given birth to Princess Sunsuk (순숙공주) in 1478, followed by two daughters who would die in infancy in 1485 and 1490, respectively, and her only son, Yi Yeok, in 1488. The crown prince, who had been put under her care prior to his fourth birthday, most likely grew up believing Lady Yun to be his biological mother.

=== Widowhood ===
In 1495, King Seongjong died of illness after being bedridden for several months. Lady Yun became queen dowager at the age of 32 and received the honorific name Jasun (자순; lit. ''benevolent and yielding''), while the crown prince (henceforth known as Yeonsangun) took the throne.

According to the Veritable Records of the Joseon Dynasty, Yeonsangun only discovered the identity of his biological mother after reading King Seongjong's epitaph. He then restored her title and position, and unleashed the Second Literati Purge, punishing and executing anyone he saw as responsible for his mother's death. During this time, Yeonsangun famously stood outside Lady Yun's chambers with a long sword in hand, demanding that she come out; Queen Shin had to intervene to dissuade him and calm the situation.

There aren't many records regarding the relationship between Lady Yun and the Deposed Queen Yun. The two were distant relatives via the Goryeo general Yun Gwan, but their kinship was tenuous. Some suggest the possibility that Lady Yun, the daughter of a powerful aristocratic clan, was in conflict with the Deposed Queen Yun, who came from a fallen gentry family. However, opinions on this are highly divided, given that Lady Yun had no son at the time and her political influence was negligible. Although Yeonsangun displayed threatening behavior toward Lady Yun amid the Second Literati Purge, he continued to treat her with respect afterward, sending her numerous gifts, conferring the additional honorific name Hwahye (화혜; lit. ''harmonious and gracious'') and holding lavish banquets in her honor.

Following a coup d'état in 1506, Yeonsangun was dethroned and exiled, and Lady Yun's son, Yi Yeok (posthumously King Jungjong), acceded to the throne. Lady Yun remained the most senior elder in the palace, but in contrast with her low profile throughout the Yeonsangun era, she took on a prominent role during King Jungjong's reign, frequently offering political advice and guidance. Her legitimate eldest grandson, Yi Ho (posthumously King Injong), was also raised under her supervision.

=== Death ===
Lady Yun suffered from lung and heart issues for around a decade before dying at the age of 68. She survived her husband by 35 years and was buried alongside him within Seolleung (선릉), today part of the Seonjeongneung burial ground in Gangnam District, Seoul.

Her obituary stated that, "The Queen Dowager was benevolent and harmonious with her family and did not seek government positions for her relatives." King Jungjong conferred the posthumous name Jeonghyeon (정현) upon Lady Yun, signifying the achievement of great thoughts ("jeong"), and her conduct being manifested both inwardly and outwardly ("hyeon").

== Titles ==
- During the reign of King Sejo (r. 1455–1468):
  - Lady, of the Papyeong Yun clan (파평 윤씨; 坡平尹氏; from 30 July 1462)
    - Yun Ho's daughter (윤호의 딸)
    - Lady Yun (윤씨; 尹氏)
- During the reign of King Seongjong (r. 1470–1495):
  - Sugui (Note: lit. 'Lady of Warm Deportment'') (숙의; 淑儀; from 17 July 1473), royal consort of the junior second rank
  - Queen (왕비; 王妃; from 18 December 1480)
- During the reign of Yeonsangun (r. 1495–1506):
  - Queen Dowager Jasun (자순왕대비; 慈順王大妃; from 29 January 1495)
- During the reign of King Jungjong (r. 1506–1544):
  - Queen Jeonghyeon (정현왕후; 貞顯王后; from 1530)

== Family ==
- Father: Yun Ho (윤호), Internal Prince Yeongwon (영원부원군; 1424–1496)
- Mother: Internal Princess Consort Yeonan (연안부부인), of the Damyang Jeon clan (담양 전씨; 1421–1500)
- Sibling(s)
  - Yun Eun-ro (윤은로) (Note: ▪︎Wife: Lady, of the Kim clan (김씨); daughter of Kim Bok-gi (김복기). ▪︎Issue: none.)
  - Yun Tang-ro (윤탕로; 1466–1508) (Note: ▪︎Wife: Lady, of the Jeonju Yi clan (전주 이씨; ?–1509); eldest daughter of Prince Unsan (운산군; 1453–1510) and great-granddaughter of King Sejong. ▪︎Issue: 3 sons, 2 daughters. [Lineage: King Sejong → Prince Milseong (밀성군; 1430–1479) → Prince Unsan → Lady Yi])
- Husband: King Seongjong (성종대왕; 28 August 1457 – 29 January 1495)
  - Biological father-in-law: King Deokjong (덕종대왕; 12 October 1438 – 29 September 1457)
  - Adoptive father-in-law: King Yejong (예종대왕; 23 January 1450 – 9 January 1470)
  - Biological mother-in-law: Queen Sohye (소혜왕후), of the Cheongju Han clan (청주 한씨; 16 October 1437 – 21 May 1504)
  - Adoptive mother-in-law: Queen Ansun (안순왕후), of the Cheongju Han clan (청주 한씨; 27 April 1445 – 12 February 1499)
- Issue
  - Princess Sunsuk (순숙공주; 1478 – 20 August 1488)
  - Unnamed daughter (1485–1486)
  - Yi Yeok (이역), King Jungjong (중종대왕; 25 April 1488 – 9 December 1544)
  - Unnamed daughter (1490)
  - Yi Yung (이융), Yeonsangun (연산군; 2 December 1476 – 30 November 1506) — Adopted.

== Ancestry ==
Ancestors of Queen Jeonghyeon

Yun Seung-sun (윤승순)
Yun Gon (윤곤)
Lady, of the Danyang Yi clan (단양 이씨)
Yun Sam-san (윤삼산)
Han Sang-jil (한상질)
Lady, of the Cheongju Han clan (청주 한씨)
Lady, of the Cheongpung Song clan (청풍 송씨)
Yun Ho, Internal Prince Yeongwon (영원부원군 윤호)
Yi Gang (이강)
Yi Won (이원)
Lady, of the Goseong Yi clan (고성 이씨)
Choe Jeong-ji (최정지)
Lady, of the Jeonju Choe clan (전주 최씨)
Queen Jeonghyeon
Jeon Man-yong (전만용)
Jeon Jwa-myeong (전좌명)
Gwon Hyeon (권현)
Lady, of the Andong Gwon clan (안동 권씨)
Internal Princess Consort Yeonan, of the Damyang Jeon clan (연안부부인 담양 전씨)
Yi Bang (이방)
Lady, of the Jeonju Yi clan (전주 이씨)

== In popular culture ==
- Portrayed by Choi Myung-gil in the 1984–1985 MBC TV series 500 Years of Joseon: The Ume Tree in the Midst of the Snow.
- Portrayed by Choi Myung-gil in the 1985 MBC TV series 500 Years of Joseon: The Wind Orchid.
- Portrayed by Ban Hyo-jung in the 1988 film Diary of King Yeonsan.
- Portrayed by Jo Min-hee in the 1994 KBS2 TV series Han Myung Hoe.
- Portrayed by Park Young-gwi in the 1995 KBS2 TV series Jang Nok Soo.
- Portrayed by Kim Ja-ok in the 1996 KBS2 TV series Jo Gwang Jo.
- Portrayed by Yoon Ji-sook in the 1998–2000 KBS1 TV series The King and the Queen.
- Portrayed by Lee Bo-hee in the 2001–2002 SBS TV series Ladies of the Palace.
- Portrayed by Eom Yu-shin in the 2003–2004 MBC TV series Jewel in the Palace.
- Portrayed by Lee Jin in the 2007–2008 SBS TV series The King and I.
- Portrayed by Han Bo-bae and Go Jeong-min in the 2011–2012 JTBC TV series Insu, the Queen Mother.
- Portrayed by Kim Kyung-hwa in the 2017 MBC TV series The Rebel.
- Portrayed by Do Ji-won in the 2017 KBS2 TV series Queen for Seven Days.
- Inspired a fictional queen dowager portrayed by Shin Eun-jung in 2025 in the tvN TV series Bon Appétit, Your Majesty.
- Inspired a fictional queen dowager portrayed by Kim Jung-nan in the 2026 KBS2 TV series To My Beloved Thief.

== See also ==
- Jungjong Restoration
- Consort kin
- Styles and titles in Joseon
- Political factions of Joseon

== Notes ==
Queen Jeonghyeon Papyeong Yun clan
Royal titles
Preceded by Queen Yun of the Haman Yun clan	Queen Consort of Joseon; 1480–1494	Succeeded by Queen Shin of the Geochang Shin clan
Preceded by Queen Dowager Inhye of the Cheongju Han clan ------- Queen Dowager Insu of the Cheongju Han clan	Queen Dowager of Joseon; 1495–1530	Succeeded by Queen Dowager Yun of the Papyeong Yun clan
