= Consort kin =

Kin of consorts in the Sinosphere

Chinese name
- Chinese: 外戚
Transcriptions
Standard Mandarin
- Hanyu Pinyin: wàiqī
- IPA: [wâɪ.tɕʰí]
Yue: Cantonese
- Yale Romanization: ngoih chīk

Vietnamese name
- Vietnamese: ngoại thích

Korean name
- Hangul: 외척
Transcriptions
- Revised Romanization: oecheok

Japanese name
- Hiragana: がいせき
Transcriptions
- Romanization: gaiseki

The consort kin or outer kins (Chinese: 外戚; pinyin: wàiqī) were the kin or a group of people related to a consort or mother of a ruler in the Sinosphere. The leading figure of the faction was either a (usually male) sibling, cousin, or parent.

While consort kins can be seen as a manifestation of nepotism in Sinospheric court politics, it is a moot point in a system where most positions were inherited via male primogeniture. The majority of the criticism lobbied against consort kins comes from the Confucian gentry class, who were often their political rival. In certain periods of Chinese history (such as the reign of Emperor Wu of Jin), consort kins were empowered by emperors in order to create political balance or to garner support for policies or actions unpopular among the Confucian elites. In other cases, emperors relied on their consort kins to hold onto power at the beginning of their reigns, because they lacked the political network a more established ruler may have had.

The perception of their outsized role in dynastic decline may be due to a bias in official historical texts, mostly written by Confucian scholars. They considered the political involvement of consort kins (and eunuchs) a disruption of the proper order, while downplaying their own negative contribution. For example, Fan Ye's Book of the Later Han focuses primarily on court corruption and eunuchs as a major factor in the fall of the Eastern Han, leaving out the social and political stagnation caused by the Confucian gentry class.

== China ==
=== Zhou dynasty ===
- The Marquis of Shen — father of the wife of King You of Zhou; his participation in a succession struggle after the king's attempt to depose his grandson and replace him with Bao Si's son Bofu led to the fall of the Western Zhou and beginning of the Spring and Autumn period

=== Han dynasty ===
- Lü clan — natal family of Empress Gao (Lü Zhi) (wife of Emperor Gaozu)
- Wei Qing — younger half-brother of Empress Xiaowusi (Wei Zifu) (second wife of Emperor Wu)
- Huo Qubing — nephew of Empress Xiaowusi
- Huo Guang — "kingmaker"; younger half-brother of Huo Qubing, father of Empress Huo (Huo Chengjun) (second wife of Emperor Xuan) and maternal grandfather of Empress Xiaozhao (wife of Emperor Zhao)
- Shangguan Jie — paternal grandfather of Empress Xiaozhao
- Wang Mang — dynastic usurper (Xin dynasty); nephew of Empress Xiaoyuan (Wang Zhengjun) (wife of Emperor Yuan)
- Ma Yuan — father of Empress Mingde (wife of Emperor Ming); passed away before his son-in-law's accession to the throne
- Dou Xian — brother of Empress Zhangde (first wife of Emperor Zhang)
- Liang Ji — deposed two emperors; brother of Empress Shunlie (Liang Na) (wife of Emperor Shun) and Empress Yixian (Liang Nüying) (first wife of Emperor Huan)
- Dou Wu — father of Empress Huansi (Dou Miao) (third wife of Emperor Huan)
- He Jin — brother of Empress Lingsi (second wife of Emperor Ling)
- Dong Cheng — father of Consort Dong (consort of Emperor Xian)
- Cao Cao — warlord; father of Empress Xianmu (Cao Jie) (second wife of Emperor Xian)

=== Three Kingdoms ===
- Mi Fang and Mi Zhu — brothers of Lady Mi (wife of Liu Bei, future Emperor Zhaolie of Shu Han)
- Wu Yi — brother of Empress Mu (Wu Xian) (last wife of Liu Bei, Emperor Zhaolie of Shu Han)
- Cao Pi — dynastic usurper (Cao Wei); son of Cao Cao and brother of Empress Xianmu (Cao Jie) (second wife of Emperor Xian of Han)
- Xie Cheng — brother of Lady Xie (first wife of Sun Quan, the future Emperor Da of Eastern Wu)

=== Jin dynasty ===
- Yang Jun — uncle of Empress Wuyuan (Yang Yan) (first wife of Emperor Wu) and father of Empress Wudao (Yang Zhi) (second wife of Emperor Wu)
- Yu Liang, Yu Shuyu, Yu Bing and Yu Yi — brothers of Empress Mingmu (Yu Wenjun) (wife of Emperor Ming)
- Chu Pou — father of Empress Kangxian (Chu Suanzi) (wife of Emperor Kang)
- Wang Gong — brother of Empress Xiaowuding (Wang Fahui) (wife of Emperor Xiaowu)

==== Sixteen Kingdoms ====
- Jin Zhun — dynastic usurper (briefly emperor of Han-Zhao); father of Upper Empress Jin (Jin Yueguang) and Right Empress Jin (Jin Yuehua) (wives of Emperor Zhaowu of Han-Zhao)
- Cheng Xia — brother of Empress Dowager Cheng (consort of Emperor Ming of Later Zhao)
- Lan Han — dynastic usurper (briefly emperor of Later Yan); father of Princess Consort Lan (wife of Murong Sheng, the future Emperor Zhaowu of Later Yan)

=== Northern and Southern dynasties ===
- Dugu Xin — the only recorded consort kin of three dynasties; father of Empress Mingjing (wife of Emperor Ming of Northern Zhou), Empress Wenxian (Dugu Qieluo) (wife of Emperor Wen of Sui) and Empress Yuanzhen (wife of Li Bing and mother of Emperor Gaozu of Tang)
- Yang Jian — dynastic usurper (Sui dynasty); father of Grand Empress Tianyuan (Yang Lihua) (first wife of Emperor Xuan of Northern Zhou)

=== Tang dynasty ===
- Zhangsun Wuji — elder brother of Empress Wende (wife of Emperor Taizong)
- Wu Chengsi and Wu Sansi — nephews of Empress Zetian (Wu Zhao) (consort of Emperor Taizong, second wife of Emperor Gaozong and sole ruler of Wu Zhou)
- Yang Guozhong — cousin of Noble Consort Yang (Yang Yuhuan) (consort of Emperor Xuanzong)

=== Five Dynasties and Ten Kingdoms ===
- Fu Yanqing — father of Empress Xuanyi and Empress Dowager Fu (wives of Emperor Shizong of Later Zhou), and Empress Yide (second wife of Zhao Guangyi, the future Emperor Taizong of Song)

=== Song dynasty ===
- Jia Sidao — younger brother of Noble Consort Huishun (consort of Emperor Lizong)

=== Yuan dynasty ===
- Khongirads — tribe of Börte (first wife of Genghis Khan) and Chabi (second wife of Kublai Khan)

=== Qing dynasty ===
- Songgotu — paternal uncle of Empress Xiaochengren (first wife of the Kangxi Emperor)
- Fuheng — younger brother of Empress Xiaoxianchun (first wife of the Qianlong Emperor)

== Japan ==
=== Asuka period ===
- Isobe clan
- Ōmiwa clan
- Mononobe clan
- Owari clan
- Katsuragi clan
- Ōtomo clan
- Soga clan — consort kin during the reigns of Empress Suiko and Emperor Sushun
  - Soga no Umako and Yamato no Aya no Koma — assassinated Emperor Sushun

=== Heian period ===
- Fujiwara clan — consort kin during the reigns of emperors Kanmu, Saga, Montoku, Seiwa, Murakami, Reizei, En'yū, Ichijō, Sanjō, Go-Ichijō, Go-Suzaku and Go-Reizei
  - Fujiwara no Yoshifusa — father-in-law of Emperor Montoku
  - Fujiwara no Kaneie — son-in-law of Emperor Murakami, father-in-law of three emperors and maternal grandfather of two emperors
  - Fujiwara no Michinaga — father-in-law of four emperors
  - Fujiwara no Yorimichi — married one granddaughter and one great-granddaughter of Emperor Murakami, father-in-law of Emperor Go-Suzaku and Emperor Go-Reizei
- Taira clan — consort kin during the reigns of emperors Takakura and Antoku
  - Taira no Kiyomori — father of Kenreimon'in

== Korea ==
=== Joseon ===
In Joseon, the king's in-laws and maternal relatives holding official positions were called cheoksin (척신; 戚臣) or oecheok (외척; 外戚). Their eras of dominance in the 16th and 19th centuries are known as Cheoksin Jeongchi (척신정치; 戚臣政治; lit. ''royal in-laws politics'') and Sedo Jeongchi (세도정치; 勢道政治; lit. ''power politics''), respectively.

- Cheongju Han clan — natal family of Queen Sinui (first wife of King Taejo), Consort Kanghuizhuangshuli (consort of the Yongle Emperor), Madame Gongshen (consort of the Xuande Emperor), Queen Sohye (wife of Crown Prince Uigyeong), Queen Jangsun (first wife of King Yejong), Queen Ansun (second wife of King Yejong), Queen Gonghye (first wife of King Seongjong) and Queen Inyeol (first wife of King Injo); especially influential during the 15th century
- Papyeong Yun clan — natal family of Queen Jeonghui (wife of King Sejo), Queen Jeonghyeon (third wife of King Seongjong), Queen Janggyeong (second wife of King Jungjong) and Queen Munjeong (third wife of King Jungjong); especially influential during the first half of the 16th century
- Hong Gyeong-ju — father of Concubine Hui (consort of King Jungjong)
- (new) Andong Kim clan — natal family of Queen Sunwon (wife of King Sunjo), Queen Hyohyeon (first wife of King Heonjong) and Queen Cheorin (wife of King Cheoljong); especially influential during the 19th century
- Pungyang Jo clan — natal family of Queen Hyosun (wife of Crown Prince Hyojang) and Queen Sinjeong (wife of Crown Prince Hyomyeong); especially influential during the 19th century
- Yeoheung Min clan — natal family of Queen Wongyeong (wife of King Taejong), Queen Inhyeon (second wife of King Sukjong), Empress Myeongseong (wife of Emperor Gojong) and Empress Sunmyeonghyo (first wife of Emperor Sunjong); there is a Korean saying that "Joseon was founded with the Yeoheung Min clan (Queen Wongyeong's family), and Joseon was destroyed by the Yeoheung Min clan (Empress Myeongseong's family)"

== Vietnam ==
- Dương Tam Kha — brother-in-law of Ngô Quyền
- Lý Thái Tổ — son-in-law of Lê Hoàn
- Trần family — in-law family of Lý Chiêu Hoàng
- Hồ Quý Ly — maternal grandfather of Trần Thiếu Đế
- Mạc Đăng Dung — had his adopted daughter marry Lê Chiêu Tông
- Trịnh lords — consort kin of several Lê emperors
