= Consort Shin =

Consort Shin may refer to:

== Consorts with the surname Shin ==
- Sugui Shin (died 1476), Crown Prince Uigyeong's concubine
- Deposed Queen Shin (1476–1537), Yeonsangun of Joseon's wife
- Queen Dangyeong (1487–1557), Jungjong of Joseon's wife

== Consorts with the title Consort Shin ==
- Shinbi Yeom (fl. 1370s), Gongmin of Goryeo's consort
