= Jangneung =

Jangneung (Korean: 장릉) may refer to:

- Jangneung (Danjong), Royal tomb in Yeongwol County
- Jangneung (Wonjong), Royal tomb in Gimpo
- Jangneung (Injo), Royal tomb in Paju
