= Jangneung (Injo) =

Royal tomb in Paju, South Korea

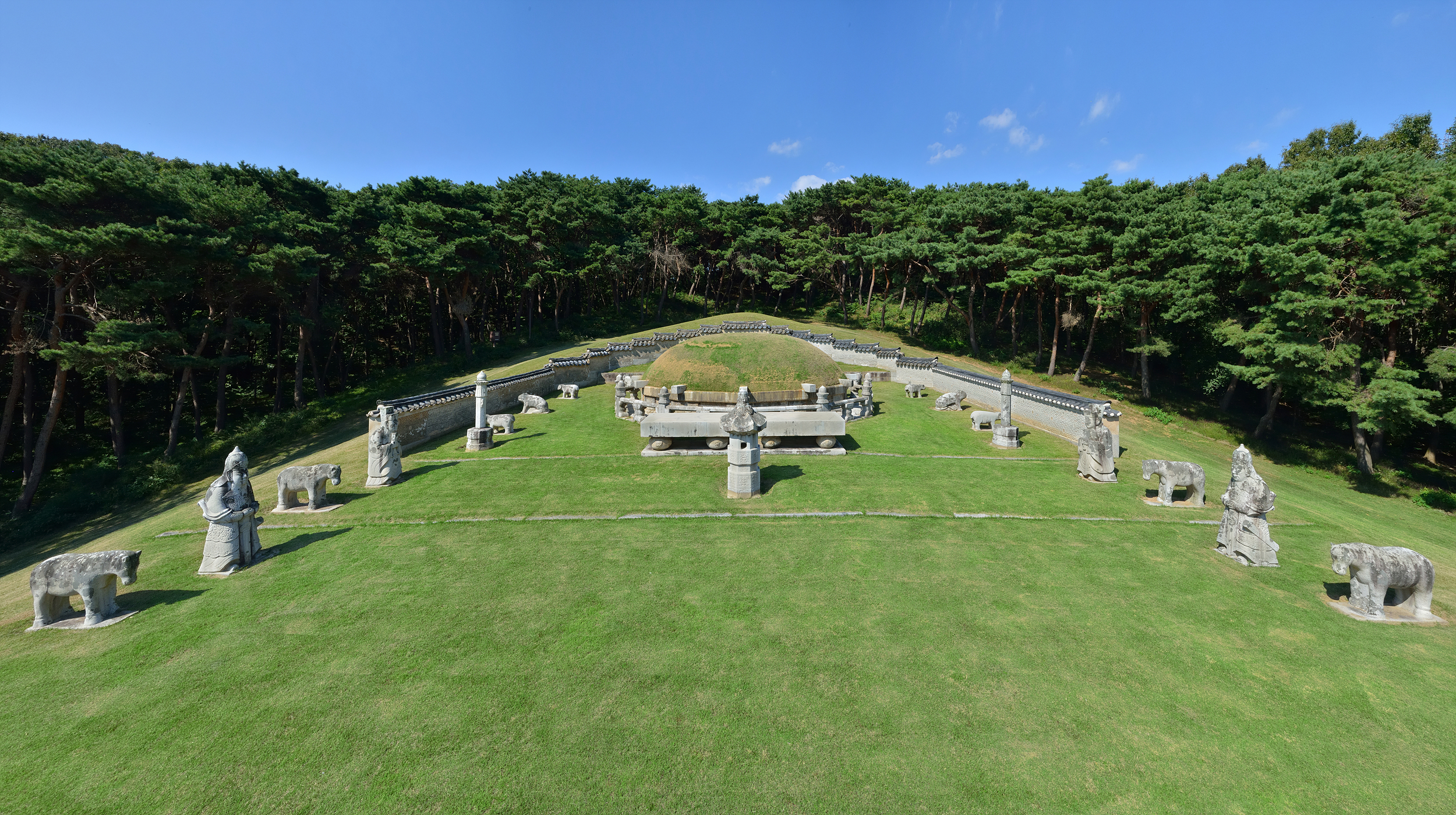
- The tomb (2013)
- Interactive map of Jangneung
- Location: 60 Galhyeon-ri, Tanhyeon-myeon, Paju, Gyeonggi Province
- Coordinates: 37.773592°N 126.708072°E
- Area: 0.345 km²

UNESCO World Heritage Site
- Type: Cultural
- Criteria: iii, iv, vi
- Designated: 2009 (33rd session)
- Part of: Royal Tombs of the Joseon Dynasty
- Reference no.: 1319

Historic Sites of South Korea
- Official name: Jangneung Royal Tomb, Paju
- Designated: 1970-05-26
- Reference no.: 203

Korean name
- Hangul: 장릉
- Hanja: 長陵
- RR: Jangneung
- MR: Changnŭng

Jangneung (Korean: 장릉; Hanja: 長陵) is a burial ground from the Joseon dynasty, where King Injo and his first wife, Queen Inyeol, were entombed. Located in Paju, Gyeonggi Province, it is recognized as an UNESCO World Heritage Site.

== History ==
It was originally built in 1635 in Uncheon-ri, Paju, but due to a fire, scorpions and snakes found refuge in the sculptures surrounding the tomb and thus the relocation became necessary. In 1731 it was moved to Galhyeon-ri. As characteristic of 17th century Korean art, the tomb is decorated with peony and lotus design.
