= The King and I (TV series) =

2007–2008 South Korean television series

- Promotional poster
- Hangul: 왕과 나
- Hanja: 王과 나
- RR: Wanggwa na
- MR: Wanggwa na
- Genre: Historical
- Written by: Yoo Dong-yoon
- Directed by: Kim Jae-hyung; Lee Jong-soo; Son Jae-sung
- Starring: Oh Man-seok; Koo Hye-sun; Go Joo-won
- Composer: Oh Joon-sung
- Country of origin: South Korea
- No. of episodes: 63

Production
- Producer: Yoon Young-mook (SBS)
- Camera setup: Multi-camera
- Running time: Mondays and Tuesdays at 21:55 (KST)
- Production companies: Olive 9 Co. Ltd. SBS PD

Original release
- Network: SBS TV
- Release: August 27, 2007 – April 1, 2008

The King and I (Korean: 왕과 나) is a South Korean historical series that aired on SBS from August 27, 2007 to April 1, 2008 on Mondays and Tuesdays at 21:55. Starring Oh Man-seok, Koo Hye-sun, and Go Joo-won, the series was moderately successful, with its ratings peak at 25%.

== Plot ==
The King and I revolves around the life of Kim Cheo-sun, considered the best eunuch attendant who lived during the Joseon period.

Cheo-sun secretly loves his childhood friend So-hwa, but he cannot confess his love because of their difference in social class. Eventually, when So-hwa becomes betrothed to King Seongjong, he castrates himself and enters the palace as an eunuch, determined to watch over and protect her.

Initially the King's concubine, So-hwa is later elevated to the rank of Queen. But she becomes a pawn of the intense strife among warring political factions, and is stripped of her title and cast out of the palace in disgrace. Despite Cheo-sun's attempts to help her, she is sentenced to death. Cheo-sun carries out his orders by handing her the bowl of poison and he watches as the woman he loved all his life dies before his eyes. After her death, he looks after her son, Prince Yeonsan.

== Cast ==
=== Main characters ===
- Oh Man-seok as Kim Cheo-sun
  - Joo Min-soo as young Cheo-sun
- Koo Hye-sun as Yoon So-hwa, later Deposed Queen Yun
  - Park Bo-young as young So-hwa
- Go Joo-won as King Seongjong
  - Yoo Seung-ho as young Prince Jalsan (later Seongjong)
- Jun Kwang-ryul as Jo Chi-gyeom, head of the eunuchs
- Yang Mi-kyung as Grand Queen Dowager Jaseong (later known as Queen Jeonghui), Seongjong's grandmother
- Jeon In-hwa as Queen Dowager Insu, Seongjong's mother
- Ahn Jae-mo as Jung Han-soo, a eunuch
  - Baek Seung-do as young Han-soo
- Jeon Hye-bin as Seol-young, Chi-gyeom's adoptive sister
- Lee Jin as Queen Yun (later known as Queen Jeonghyeon)

=== Supporting characters ===
- Shin Goo as Eunuch Noh, Chi-gyeom's adoptive father
- Kim Soo-mi as old woman So-gwi, in charge of discipline at the eunuch training house
- Yoon Yoo-sun as Wol-hwa, Cheo-sun's foster mother / Soginopa's daughter)
- Kang Nam-gil as Choi Cham-bong, eunuch trainer
- Jung Tae-woo as Yi Yung, Prince Yeonsan, King Seongjong and So-hwa's son
  - Jung Yoon-seok as young Yi Yung
- Kim Sa-rang as Eoudong

=== Extended cast ===
- Yang Jung-a as Lady Oh, Cheo-sun's mother
- Lee Il-jae as Kim Ja-myung, Cheo-sun's father
- Sunwoo Jae-duk as Yoon Ki-kyun, So-hwa's father
- Choi Jung-won as Lady Shin, Ki-kyun's wife
- Han Da-min as Queen Gonghye
  - Kim Hee-jung as young Lady Han
- Han So-jung as Court Lady Um
- Yoon Hye-kyung as Royal Consort Eom Gwi-in
- Ahn Gil-kang as Kae Do-chi
- Kim Jung-min as Beo Deul-yi
  - Jo Jung-eun as young Deul-yi
- Kim Da-hyun as Choi Ja-chi
  - Yoo Tae-woong as young Ja-chi
- Kang In-hyung as Moon So-woon
  - Jeon Ha-eun as young So-woon
- Kim Ha-kyun as Jang Soon-moo
- Kim Myung-soo as Yang Sung-yoon
- Han Jung-soo as Do Geum-pyo
- Kim So-hyun as Lady Jung, Ji-gyeom's wife
- Kim Byung-se as King Sejo
- Yoo Dong-hyuk as King Yejong
- Kim Jong-gyul as Han Myung-hoe
- Kim Young-joon as Hong Gwi-nam
  - Shin Tae-hoon as young Gwi-nam
- Kang Jae as Kim Ja-won
  - Choi Soo-han as young Ja-won
- Lee Gun-joo as Song Gye-nam
  - Maeung Chang-min as young Gye-nam
- Lee Sang-won as Shim Ki-soo
- Park Ha-sun as Queen Shin, Yeonsan's wife
- Kim Hyuk as Park Deok-hu, So-hwa's first love
- Jung Eun-chan as Yoon Ki-hyun, So-hwa's older brother
  - Ho Hyo-hoon as young Ki-hyun
- Lee Young-eun as palace maid
- Kim Yong-heon as Eom Nae-kwan
- Kim Byung-choon as Yang Sung-yeon
- Park Dong-bin as Goo Sung-gun
- Choi Ha-na as Hong Bi
- Lee Ji-oh as the Crown Prince, Yeonsan's son
- Jun Hyun-ah as Court Lady Kam-chul
- Oh Soo-min as Jang Nok-su
- Nam Hyun-joo as Han-soo's mother
- Lee Si-hoo as Eunuch
- Jung Ki-sung as Jogeobi
- Song Young-gyu as Lee Ki
- Shin Soo-jung as Hoo Koong
- Seol Ji-yoon as Court Lady Kim
- Jung So-young
- Kang Soo-han
- Noh Young-hak as Grand Prince Jinseong
- Jun Tae-soo as Han Chi-geun
- Park Ji-hoon as eunuch

== Production ==
Park Sang-min was originally cast as King Seongjong, but had to back out. He was replaced by Go Joo-won.

Yeo Woon-kye was supposed to portray So-gwi but had to quit for health reasons, even though she had already filmed a few episodes. Her replacement was Kim Soo-mi.

Reportedly enraged because the scripts were routinely turned in late, resulting in exhaustion for the actors in the cast, Jeon In-hwa's husband Yoo Dong-geun assaulted two producers on set on December 29, 2007. He later apologized for the incident.

== Episode ratings ==
The King and I performed moderately well, getting ratings in the 20%–25% range and ranking in the top 10. However, in late January 2008, due to competition from MBC's Yi San, ratings fell to the mid-tens, barely cracking the Top 20 in Korea.

SBS first extended the episodes from the originally planned 50 to 67, then back to 61 because of bad ratings, and finally to 63.

=== Ratings ===
Date	Episode	Nationwide	Seoul
2007-08-27	1	14.4 (7th)	14.8 (6th)
2007-08-28	2	18.8 (3rd)	19.7 (3rd)
2007-09-03	3	22.9 (2nd)	24.9 (1st)
2007-09-04	4	25.8 (1st)	27.1 (1st)
2007-09-10	5	22.3 (2nd)	23.3 (2nd)
2007-09-11	6	21.0 (2nd)	22.0 (2nd)
2007-09-17	7	25.6 (2nd)	26.5 (1st)
2007-09-18	8	23.1 (2nd)	24.2 (2nd)
2007-09-24	9	12.9 (4th)	13.6 (4th)
2007-09-24	10	19.8 (1st)	20.1 (1st)
2007-10-01	11	23.3 (2nd)	23.4 (2nd)
2007-10-02	12	24.0 (2nd)	23.6 (2nd)
2007-10-08	13	22.0 (2nd)	22.7 (2nd)
2007-10-09	14	23.3 (2nd)	24.2 (2nd)
2007-10-15	15	22.4 (2nd)	23.4 (2nd)
2007-10-16	16	23.5 (2nd)	24.6 (2nd)
2007-10-22	17	23.1 (2nd)	24.5 (2nd)
2007-10-23	18	24.1 (3rd)	25.5 (3rd)
2007-10-29	19	26.0 (2nd)	26.5 (2nd)
2007-10-30	20	22.2 (2nd)	22.3 (3rd)
2007-11-05	21	21.8 (2nd)	23.1 (3rd)
2007-11-06	22	22.9 (2nd)	24.4 (2nd)
2007-11-12	23	20.5 (3rd)	21.4 (3rd)
2007-11-13	24	22.6 (3rd)	23.6 (3rd)
2007-11-19	25	19.7 (5th)	20.6 (4th)
2007-11-20	26	20.8 (4th)	21.5 (4th)
2007-11-26	27	21.3 (4th)	22.1 (3rd)
2007-11-27	28	21.0 (3rd)	21.1 (3rd)
2007-12-03	29	20.0 (3rd)	19.6 (4th)
2007-12-04	30	20.2 (5th)	19.9 (4th)
2007-12-10	31	19.2 (5th)	19.2 (5th)
2007-12-11	32	24.8 (1st)	25.4 (2nd)
2007-12-17	33	17.0 (6th)	17.4 (6th)
2007-12-18	34	16.1 (6th)	15.6 (6th)
2007-12-24	35	13.2 (8th)	12.7 (8th)
2007-12-25	36	16.0 (6th)	15.7 (6th)
2008-01-01	37	15.9 (7th)	15.6 (7th)
2008-01-07	38	15.1 (6th)	14.8 (6th)
2008-01-08	39	15.0 (7th)	15.1 (7th)
2008-01-14	40	15.0 (7th)	15.0 (8th)
2008-01-15	41	15.6 (6th)	15.6 (8th)
2008-01-21	42	14.5 (8th)	13.9 (8th)
2008-01-22	43	15.6 (8th)	15.5 (8th)
2008-01-28	44	14.5 (8th)	13.5 (9th)
2008-01-29	45	14.8 (8th)	14.5 (9th)
2008-02-04	46	12.9 (10th)	11.5 (11th)
2008-02-05	47	16.7 (6th)	16.1 (6th)
2008-02-11	48	15.0 (8th)	14.5 (9th)
2008-02-12	49	14.3 (8th)	14.0 (10th)
2008-02-18	50	13.6 (10th)	12.9 (11th)
2008-02-19	51	16.6 (7th)	15.9 (8th)
2008-02-25	52	14.7 (7th)	14.3 (8th)
2008-02-26	53	19.5 (5th)	19.2 (6th)
2008-03-03	54	17.0 (6th)	16.8 (6th)
2008-03-04	55	17.9 (6th)	17.5 (6th)
2008-03-10	56	15.5 (6th)	15.2 (6th)
2008-03-11	57	15.7 (6th)	15.6 (6th)
2008-03-17	58	14.9 (6th)	14.8 (6th)
2008-03-18	59	14.9 (6th)	14.0 (7th)
2008-03-24	60	13.9 (7th)	13.0 (9th)
2008-03-25	61	16.1 (6th)	15.7 (6th)
2008-03-31	62	17.2 (6th)	16.7 (7th)
2008-04-01	63	19.7 (5th)	18.9 (6th)
Average		-	-

== Awards ==
2007 SBS Drama Awards

- Top Excellence Award, Actor Jun Kwang-ryul
- Excellence Award, Actor in a Serial Drama: Oh Man-seok
- Top 10 Stars: Jun Kwang-ryul
- Best Teen Actor: Yoo Seung-ho
- Best Teen Actor: Joo Min-soo
- Best Teen Actress: Park Bo-young
- Achievement Award: Shin Goo
- New Star Award: Koo Hye-sun
