= Pungcheon Im clan =

Korean clan from South Hwanghae Province

- Country: Korea
- Current region: Kwail County
- Founder: Im On
- Connected members: Im Si-wan; Lim Eun-kyung; Im Chang-jung; Yim Jae-beom; Yim Tae-hee; Im Gwang; Yujeong; Im Sahong

The Pungcheon Im clan (Korean: 풍천 임씨; Hanja: 豊川 任氏) is a Korean clan based in Kwail County, South Hwanghae Province. According to the research held in 2015, the number of Pungcheon Im clan’s member was 143881. Their founder was Im On who was from Shaoxing, China and came to Goryeo. Im On worked as Chao Feng Dai Fu (Hanja: 朝奉大夫) and General-in-Chief (Hanja: 大將軍) during Chungnyeol of Goryeo’s reign. Im Ju (Hanja: 任澍), 6 th descendant of Im On, was settled in Hwanghae Province and founded Pungcheon Im clan.

== See also ==
- Korean clan names of foreign origin
