= Queen Inyeol =

Queen of Joseon from 1623 to 1636

Queen Consort of Joseon
- Tenure: 13 April 1623 – 16 January 1636
- Predecessor: Queen Yu
- Successor: Queen Jangnyeol
- Born: 16 August 1594; Wonju-eup, Gangwon Province, Joseon
- Died: 16 January 1636 (aged 41); Yeohwidang, Changgyeonggung, Hanseong, Joseon
- Burial: Jangneung, Paju, South Korea
- Spouse: King Injo (m. 1610)
- Issue Detail: 6 sons, 1 daughter
Posthumous name
- Queen Jeongyu Myeongdeok Jeongsun Inyeol (정유명덕정순인열왕후; 正裕明德貞順仁烈王后)
- Clan: Cheongju Han (by birth); Jeonju Yi (by marriage)
- Dynasty: Yi
- Father: Han Jun-gyeom, Internal Prince Seopyeong
- Mother: Internal Princess Consort Hoesan, of the Changwon Hwang clan

Korean name
- Hangul: 인열왕후
- Hanja: 仁烈王后
- RR: Inyeol wanghu
- MR: Inyŏl wanghu

Queen Inyeol (Korean: 인열왕후; Hanja: 仁烈王后; 16 August 1594 – 16 January 1636), of the Cheongju Han clan, was the first wife of King Injo, the 16th monarch of Joseon, and the mother of Crown Prince Sohyeon and King Hyojong. She was queen of Joseon from 1623 until her death in 1636.

== Biography ==
=== Early life and lineage ===
The future Queen Inyeol was born during the reign of King Seonjo, as the sixth child and fourth daughter among two sons and six daughters. Her father was Han Jun-gyeom (한준겸) and her mother was a lady from the Changwon Hwang clan. Her two younger sisters were of concubine birth.

Both of Lady Han's parents were descendants of Grand Prince Hyoryeong: her paternal great-grandfather, Shin Geon (신건), was a great-grandson of Hyoryeong's fourth son, Prince Nagan (낙안군), whereas her maternal great-grandfather, Hwang Tang-gyeong (황탕경), was a great-grandson of his second son, Prince Seowon (서원군). As a member of the Cheongju Han clan, Lady Han was also a distant cousin of Queen Jangsun, Queen Gonghye, Queen Insu and Queen Ansun, sharing Han Ak (한악) as their ancestor.

=== Marriage ===
In 1610, around the age of 16, Lady Han married 14-year-old Prince Neungyang, the eldest son of Prince Jeongwon and a nephew of the then-reigning king, Gwanghaegun. In 1612, she gave birth to Yi Wang, followed by Yi Ho in 1619, and Yi Yo in 1623.

=== As queen ===
In 1623, her husband (posthumously King Injo) took the throne after leading a coup d'état against Gwanghaegun, and Lady Han thus became queen. Less than one year later, while pregnant with her fourth son, Yi Gon (이곤), she had to flee to Gongju with Queen Dowager Soseong when Yi Kwal's Rebellion broke out. In 1627, she had to flee once again, this time to Ganghwa Island, due to the Later Jin invasion. The previous year, in 1626, she had given birth to her only daughter, but both this child and her fifth son, who would be born in 1629, died in infancy. A seventh pregnancy resulted in a stillborn son in 1636.

Lady Han possessed a benevolent yet strong-willed character and her strict governance brought stability to the inner court. Furthermore, her excellent relationship with King Injo allowed her to often act as his adviser and her efforts were credited as one of the reasons behind the turn of public sentiment toward Injo after the coup d'état.

=== Death ===
Lady Han never recovered from her last childbirth and died five days later, at the age of 41. She was buried within Jangneung (장릉) in present-day Paju, Gyeonggi Province. King Injo, who survived Lady Han by 13 years, was later buried alongside her. Their tomb was moved to its current location during the reign of King Yeongjo due to various problems, such as snakes appearing at the original site.

King Injo conferred the posthumous name Inyeol (인열) upon Lady Han, describing her as practicing benevolence and following righteousness ("in"), and having merit and bringing peace to the people ("yeol"). Injo had initially wanted to use Myeongheon (명헌; lit. ''enlightened ideal''), but was dissuaded by Inspector-General Kim Sang-heon (김상헌) who stated that this decision was the responsibility of the officials in charge and could not be made according to the wishes of the monarch.

== Titles ==
- During the reign of King Seonjo (r. 1567–1608):
  - Lady, of the Cheongju Han clan (청주 한씨; 淸州韓氏; from 16 August 1594)
    - Han Jun-gyeom's daughter (한준겸의 딸)
    - Lady Han (한씨; 韓氏)
- During the reign of Gwanghaegun (r. 1608–1623):
  - Princess Consort Cheongseong (청성현부인; 淸城縣夫人; from 1610)
- During the reign of King Injo (r. 1623–1649):
  - Queen (왕비; 王妃; from 13 April 1623)
  - Queen Inyeol (인열왕후; 仁烈王后; from 1636)

== Family ==
- Father: Han Jun-gyeom (한준겸), Internal Prince Seopyeong (서평부원군; 1557–1627)
- Mother: Internal Princess Consort Hoesan (회산부부인) of the Changwon Hwang clan (창원 황씨; 1561–1594)
- Sibling(s)
  - Lady, of the Cheongju Han clan (청주 한씨) (Note: Married Yi Yu-yeon (이유연; 1571–1615) from the Wansan Yi clan (완산 이씨).)
  - Han Hoe-il (한회일; 1580–1642) (Note: ▪︎Wife: Lady, of the Jeonju Yi clan (전주 이씨); daughter of Minister of Revenue Yi Seong-jung (이성중) and a descendant of King Sejong. ▪︎Issue: 2 sons. [Biological lineage: King Sejong → Prince Gyeyang → Prince Gangyang (강양군) → Yi Jip (이집) → Yi Gam (이감) → Yi Seong-jung → Lady Yi; Adoptive lineage: King Sejong → Prince Damyang (담양군; 1439–1450) → Prince Gangyang (강양군) → Yi Jip (이집) → Yi Gam (이감) → Yi Seong-jung → Lady Yi])
  - Lady, of the Cheongju Han clan (청주 한씨; 1586–1637) (Note: Committed suicide to preserve her chastity during the Qing invasion.) (Note: Married Yeo I-jing (여이징; 1588–1656) from the Hamyang Yeo clan (함양 여씨). They had no biological issue (1 adopted son).)
  - Lady, of the Cheongju Han clan (청주 한씨; 1588–1637) (Note: Married Jeong Baek-chang (정백창; 1588–1635) from the Jinju Jeong clan (진주 정씨).)
  - Han So-il (한소일; 1591–1608) (Note: ▪︎Wife: Lady, of the Jeonju Yu clan (전주 유씨); daughter of Chief State Councilor Yu Yeong-gyeong (유영경; 1550–1608). They had issue (1 daughter).)
  - Lady, of the Cheongju Han clan (청주 한씨) (Note: Half-sister of concubine birth.) (Note: Married Yi Hwan (이환).)
  - Lady, of the Cheongju Han clan (청주 한씨; 1612–1637) (Note: Married Yi Se-wan (이세완), Prince Jinwon (진원군; 1603–1655); great-great-grandson of King Seongjong. [Biological lineage: King Seongjong → Prince Gyeongmyeong (경명군; 1489–1552) → Prince Annam (안남군; 1520–?) → Prince Yeongcheon (영천군; 1550–?) → Prince Jinwon; Adoptive lineage: King Seongjong → Prince Yangwon (양원군; 1491–1551) → Prince Hamnyeong (함녕군; 1524–1579) → Prince Yeongcheon → Prince Jinwon])
- Husband: King Injo (인조대왕; 7 December 1595 – 17 June 1649)
  - Father-in-law: King Wonjong (원종대왕; 12 August 1580 – 23 January 1620)
  - Mother-in-law: Queen Inheon (인헌왕후), of the Neungseong Gu clan (능성 구씨; 2 June 1578 – 10 February 1626)
- Issue
  - Yi Wang (이왕), Crown Prince Sohyeon (소현세자; 5 February 1612 – 21 May 1645)
  - Yi Ho (이호), King Hyojong (봉림대군; 3 July 1619 – 23 June 1659)
  - Yi Yo (이요), Grand Prince Inpyeong (인평대군; 10 January 1623 – 13 June 1658) (Note: Ancestor of Emperor Gojong.)
  - Yi Gon (이곤), Grand Prince Yongseong (용성대군; 14 October 1624 – 22 December 1629) (Note: ▪︎Wife: none. ▪︎Issue: 1 adopted son.)
  - Unnamed daughter (1626)
  - Unnamed son (1629)
  - Unnamed son (1636)

== Ancestry ==
Ancestors of Queen Inyeol

Han Seung-won (한승원)
Han Yeo-pil (한여필)
Lady, of the Andong Kim clan (안동 김씨)
Han Hyo-yun (한효윤)
Yu Eom (유엄)
Lady, of the Munhwa Yu clan (문화 유씨)
Han Jun-gyeom, Internal Prince Seopyeong (서평부원군 한준겸)
Shin U-ho (신우호)
Shin Geon (신건)
Lady, of the Pyongsan Shin clan (평산 신씨)
Lady, of the Sunheung An clan (순흥 안씨)
Queen Inyeol
Hwang Jun-won (황준원)
Hwang Tang-gyeong (황탕경)
Lady, of the Jeonju Yi clan (전주 이씨)
Hwang Seong (황성)
Oh Gyeol (오결)
Lady, of the Haeju Oh clan (해주 오씨)
Lady, of the Yi clan (이씨)
Internal Princess Consort Hoesan, of the Changwon Hwang clan (회산부부인 창원 황씨)
Yi Go (이고)
Lady, of the Ubong Yi clan (우봉 이씨)

== In popular culture ==
- Portrayed by Seo Woo-rim in the 1981 KBS1 TV series Daemyeong.
- Portrayed by Kim Do-yeon in the 1986–1987 MBC TV series 500 Years of Joseon: Namhan Mountain Fortress.
- Portrayed by Lee Seung-ah in the 2015 MBC TV series Splendid Politics.

== See also ==
- History of Korea
- Consort kin
- Styles and titles in Joseon

== Notes ==
Queen Inyeol Cheongju Han clan
Royal titles
Preceded by Queen Yu of the Munhwa Yu clan	Queen Consort of Joseon; 1623–1636	Succeeded by Queen Jangnyeol of the Yangju Jo clan
