= Queen Ansun =

Queen of Joseon from 1468 to 1470

Grand Queen Dowager of Joseon
- Tenure: 29 January 1495 – 12 February 1499
- Predecessor: Grand Queen Dowager Jaseong
- Successor: Grand Queen Dowager Seongryeol
- With: Grand Queen Dowager Insu

Queen Dowager of Joseon
- Tenure: 9 January 1470 – 29 January 1495
- Predecessor: Queen Dowager Jaseong
- Successor: Queen Dowager Jasun
- With: Queen Dowager Insu (from 1475)

Queen Consort of Joseon
- Tenure: 1 October 1468 – 9 January 1470
- Predecessor: Queen Jeonghui
- Successor: Queen Gonghye
- Born: 27 April 1445; Hanseong, Joseon
- Died: 12 February 1499 (aged 53); Jagyeongjeon, Gyeongbokgung, Hanseong, Joseon
- Burial: Changneung, Seooreung Cluster, Goyang, South Korea
- Spouse: King Yejong (m. 1468; died 1470) (Note: Lady Han had become Yejong's consort five years prior to her elevation to the position of legitimate wife.)
- Issue Detail: 3 sons (1 adopted son), 2 daughters
Regnal name
- Inhye Myeongui (인혜명의; 仁惠明懿) (Note: Known as honorific name (존호; 尊號) in the Sinosphere, its closest equivalent in the English-speaking world is the regnal name.)
Posthumous name
- Queen Sohwi Jesuk Ansun (소휘제숙안순왕후; 昭徽齊淑安順王后)
- Clan: Cheongju Han (by birth); Jeonju Yi (by marriage)
- Dynasty: Yi
- Father: Han Baek-ryun, Internal Prince Cheongcheon
- Mother: Internal Princess Consort Seoha, of the Pungcheon Im clan
- Religion: Buddhism

Korean name
- Hangul: 안순왕후
- Hanja: 安順王后
- RR: Ansun wanghu
- MR: Ansun wanghu

Queen Ansun (Korean: 안순왕후; Hanja: 安順王后; 27 April 1445 – 12 February 1499) of the Cheongju Han clan, was the second wife of King Yejong, the eighth monarch of Joseon. She was queen of Joseon from 1468 until her husband's death in 1470, and was then styled as Queen Dowager Inhye during the reign of her adopted son, King Seongjong, and as Grand Queen Dowager Inhye during the reign of her adopted grandson, the tyrannical Yeonsangun.

== Biography ==
=== Early life and lineage ===
The future Queen Ansun was born during the reign of King Sejong, as the eldest child among four sons and five daughters. Her father was Han Baek-ryun (한백륜), who would later become right state councilor, and her mother was a lady from the Pungcheon Im clan.

On her paternal side, she was a fifth cousin of Yejong's first wife, Queen Jangsun, and her sister, Queen Gonghye, and a fifth cousin five times removed of Queen Inyeol, sharing Han Ak (한악) as their ancestor. Via Han Ak's fifth son, Han Bang-sin (한방신), she was also a fourth cousin once removed of Queen Insu. Moreover, Princess Consort Cheongcheon (청천현부인) and Gwiin Han (귀인 한씨) were Lady Han's nieces. The former married Prince Iseong (이성군), the eldest son of King Seongjong's fourth son, Prince Wanwon (완원군); the latter became a consort of King Jungjong.

=== Life in the palace ===
In 1462, Crown Princess Han (posthumously Queen Jangsun) died. The following year, Lady Han was appointed as a consort of the crown prince of the junior fifth rank (소훈; sohun); although she was not a principal consort, she received the treatment of one.

In 1468, King Sejo abdicated in favor of his second son, Yi Hwang (posthumouly King Yejong), and designated Lady Han as the new queen. Since she was heavily pregnant and living in her natal home at that time, guards were sent to protect the residence.

Lady Han gave birth to two daughters and two sons, but only one prince and one princess survived infancy.

=== Widowhood and later life ===
Her tenure as queen was short, as King Yejong passed away 15 months after his accession, and, to make the situation worse, their only son, Yi Hyeon (이현), was deemed too young to take the throne. Instead, her mother-in-law, Queen Dowager Jaseong, chose King Yejong's nephew, Prince Jalsan (posthumously King Seongjong). The new king was only the second son of the late Crown Prince Uigyeong and it was most likely his marriage to a daughter of the powerful Han Myeong-hoe that brought about his grandmother's decision. Subsequently, Yi Hyeon was enfeoffed as Grand Prince Jean (제안대군), and in 1474, he was adopted as the heir of Grand Prince Pyongwon (평원대군), King Sejong's ninth son, on the grounds that he posed a threat to Seongjong's legitimacy.

Lady Han, as the wife of King Yejong and the adoptive mother of King Seongjong, became queen dowager and received the honorific name Inhye (인혜).

Conflicts arose when Crown Prince Uigyeong was posthumously declared king, and his widow (King Seongjong's biological mother), Crown Princess Su, was elevated to the position of queen with the honorific name Insu (인수). Because there was a need to determine the hierarchy between Lady Han and Queen Insu, Shin Suk-ju, with the approval of Grand Queen Dowager Jaseong, solved the problem by declaring that they would heed the rules of private households, which followed sibling order, rather than the rules of the royal family, meaning Queen Insu was the superior. In 1475, when Uigyeong was conferred a temple name and had his status raised to great king (대왕), Queen Insu was promoted to queen dowager. At this time, the issue of hierarchy was brought up again, but it was settled once more by establishing Queen Dowager Insu as the superior.

In 1495, upon the death of King Seongjong and the accession to the throne of his eldest son, Yi Yung (later known as Yeonsangun/Prince Yeonsan), Lady Han was elevated to the rank of grand queen dowager alongside Queen Dowager Insu.

=== Death ===
Lady Han died at the age of 53, having survived her husband by 29 years. She was buried alongside him within Changneung (창릉), today part of the Seooreung Cluster in Goyang, Gyeonggi Province.

== Titles ==
- During the reign of King Sejong (r. 1418–1450):
  - Lady, of the Cheongju Han clan (청주 한씨; 淸州韓氏; from 27 April 1445)
    - Han Baek-ryun's daughter (한백륜의 딸)
    - Lady Han (한씨; 韓氏)
- During the reign of King Sejo (r. 1455–1468):
  - Sohun (Note: lit. ''Lady of Clear Instruction'') (소훈; 昭訓; from 29 August 1463), consort of the crown prince of the junior fifth rank
- During the reign of King Yejong (r. 1468–1470):
  - Queen (왕비; 王妃; from 1 October 1468)
- During the reign of King Seongjong (r. 1470–1495):
  - Queen Dowager Inhye (인혜왕대비; 仁惠王大妃; from 9 January 1470)
- During the reign of Yeonsangun (r. 1495–1506):
  - Grand Queen Dowager Inhye (인혜대왕대비; 仁惠大王大妃; from 29 January 1495)
  - Queen Ansun (안순왕후; 安順王后; from 1499)

== Family ==
- Father: Han Baek-ryun (한백륜), Internal Prince Cheongcheon (청천부원군; 1427–1474)
- Mother: Internal Princess Consort Seoha (서하부부인), of the Pungcheon Im clan (풍천 임씨; ?–1472)
- Sibling(s)
  - Han Hwan (한환), Prince Cheongcheon (청천군; ?–1499) (Note: ▪︎Wife: Lady, of the Okcheon Jo clan (옥천 조씨); daughter of Jo Ji-san (조지산). ▪︎Issue: 1 son.)
  - Han Yeol (한열) (Note: ▪︎Wife: Lady, of the Yeoju Yi clan (여주 이씨); only daughter of Yi Jeung-yak (이증약), granddaughter of Commandery Princess Jaeryeong (재령군주; 1409–?) and great-granddaughter of Grand Prince Yangnyeong. ▪︎Issue: 2 sons, 1 daughter.)
  - Han Hang (한항) (Note: ▪︎Wife: Lady, of the Changwon Hwang clan (창원 황씨); daughter of Hwang Suk (황숙). ▪︎Issue: 2 sons, 1 daughter.)
  - Han Sun (한순), Prince Seowon (서원군; 1453–1540) (Note: ▪︎Wife: Lady, of the Pyongyang Jo clan (평양 조씨); daughter of Jo Chang-mun (조창문). ▪︎Issue: 1 son, 2 daughters.)
  - Princess Consort Cheonan (천안군부인), of the Cheongju Han clan (청주 한씨; 1447–?) (Note: Married Chief State Councilor Yi Jun (이준), Prince Gwiseong (귀성군; 1441–1479); second son of Grand Prince Imyong. They had no biological issue (1 adopted son).)
  - Lady, of the Cheongju Han clan (청주 한씨) (Note: Married Nam Hyo-won (남효원) from the Uiryeong Nam clan (의령 남씨).)
  - Lady, of the Cheongju Han clan (청주 한씨) (Note: Married Won Chi (원치) from the Wonju Won clan (원주 원씨).)
  - Lady, of the Cheongju Han clan (청주 한씨; 1459–?) (Note: Married Shin Su-yeong (신수영; 1461–1506) from the Geochang Shin clan (거창 신씨); third son of Shin Seung-seon (신승선), Internal Prince Geochang (거창부원군; 1436–1502), maternal grandson of Grand Prince Imyong and elder brother of Deposed Queen Shin. They had issue (2 sons).)
- Husband: King Yejong (예종대왕; 23 January 1450 – 9 January 1470)
  - Father-in-law: King Sejo (세조대왕; 11 November 1417 – 2 October 1468)
  - Mother-in-law: Queen Jeonghui (정희왕후), of the Papyeong Yun clan (파평 윤씨; 25 December 1418 – 15 May 1483)
- Issue
  - Princess Hyeonsuk (현숙공주; 28 March 1464 – 2 July 1502) (Note: Married Im Gwang-jae (임광재), Prince Consort Pungcheon (풍천위; ?–1495) from the Pungcheon Im clan (풍천 임씨); eldest son of Im Sa-hong and great-great-grandson of King Taejong. They had no issue. [Lineage: King Taejong → Grand Prince Hyoryeong → Prince Boseong (보성군; 1416–1499) → Lady, of the Jeonju Yi clan → Im Gwang-jae])
  - Yi Hyeon (이현), Grand Prince Jean (제안대군; 8 March 1466 – 6 January 1526) (Note: ▪︎1st wife: Grand Princess Consort Sangsan (상산부부인), of the Sangsan Kim clan (상산 김씨; ?–1529); daughter of Kim Su-mal (김수말) — Divorced and remarried. ▪︎2nd wife: Lady, of the Suncheon Park clan (순천 박씨; ?–1485); seventh daughter of Park Jung-seon (박중선; 1435–1481), sister of Park Won-jong and maternal aunt of Queen Janggyeong — Divorced. ▪︎Issue: 1 adopted son.)
  - Princess Hyesun (혜순공주; 1468 – 19 September 1469)
  - Unnamed son
  - Yi Hyeol (이혈), King Seongjong (성종대왕; 28 August 1457 – 29 January 1495) — Adopted.

== Ancestry ==
Ancestors of Queen Ansun

Han Hyu (한휴)
Han Gye-bok (한계복)
Lady, of the Andong Gwon clan (안동 권씨)
Han Chang (한창)
Yeom Jeong-su (염정수)
Lady, of the Paju Yeom clan (파주 염씨)
Han Baek-ryun, Internal Prince Cheongcheon (청천부원군 한백륜)
Yi Uk (이욱)
Lady, of the Jeonui Yi clan (전의 이씨)
Queen Ansun
Im Yu (임유)
Internal Princess Consort Seoha, of the Pungcheon Im clan (서하부부인 풍천 임씨)
Lady, of the Papyeong Yun clan (파평 윤씨)

== In popular culture ==
- Portrayed by Lee In-hye and Kim Eun-ju in the 1994 KBS2 TV series Han Myung Hoe.
- Portrayed by Choi Eun-sook in the 1995 KBS2 TV series Jang Nok Soo.
- Portrayed by Kyung In-sun in the 1998–2000 KBS1 TV series The King and the Queen.
- Portrayed by Lee Jae-in in the SBS 2007–2008 TV series The King and I.
- Portrayed by Kim Won-hee and Lee Yeon-doo in the 2011–2012 JTBC TV series Insu, the Queen Mother.

== See also ==
- Styles and titles in Joseon
- History of Korea
- Politics of Joseon

== Notes ==
Queen Ansun Cheongju Han clan
Royal titles
Preceded by Queen Jeonghui of the Papyeong Yun	Queen Consort of Joseon; 1468–1470	Succeeded by Queen Gonghye of the Cheongju Han clan
Preceded by Queen Dowager Jaseong of the Papyeong Yun clan	Queen Dowager of Joseon; 1470–1495 with Queen Dowager Insu from 1475	Succeeded by Queen Dowager Jasun of the Papyeong Yun clan
Preceded by Grand Queen Dowager Jaseong of the Papyeong Yun clan	Grand Queen Dowager of Joseon; 1495–1499 with Grand Queen Dowager Insu	Succeeded by Grand Queen Dowager Seongryeol of the Papyeong Yun clan
