= Queen Gonghye =

Queen of Joseon from 1470 to 1474

Queen Consort of Joseon
- Tenure: 9 January 1470 – 9 May 1474
- Predecessor: Queen Ansun
- Successor: Queen Yun
- Born: 17 November 1456; Yeonhwa-bang, Hanseong, Joseon
- Died: 9 May 1474 (aged 17); Guhyeonjeon, Changdeokgung, Hanseong, Joseon
- Burial: Sulleung, Samneung Cluster, Paju, South Korea
- Spouse: King Seongjong (m. 1467)
Names
- Han Song-yi (한송이; 韓松伊)
Posthumous name
- Queen Hwiui Sinsuk Gonghye (휘의신숙공혜왕후; 徽懿愼肅恭惠王后)
- Clan: Cheongju Han (by birth); Jeonju Yi (by marriage)
- Dynasty: Yi
- Father: Han Myeong-hoe, Internal Prince Sangdang
- Mother: Internal Princess Consort Hwangnyeo, of the Yeoheung Min clan

Korean name
- Hangul: 공혜왕후
- Hanja: 恭惠王后
- RR: Gonghye wanghu
- MR: Konghye wanghu

Queen Gonghye (Korean: 공혜왕후; Hanja: 恭惠王后; 17 November 1456 – 9 May 1474), of the Cheongju Han clan, personal name Han Song-yi, was the first wife of King Seongjong, the ninth monarch of Joseon, and the younger sister of Queen Jangsun. She was queen of Joseon from 1470 until her death in 1474.

== Biography ==
=== Early life and lineage ===
The future Queen Gonghye was born during the reign of King Sejo, as the legitimate youngest daughter among one son and four daughters. Her father was Han Myeong-hoe, the famed kingmaker who would later become chief state councilor, and her mother was a lady from the illustrious Yeoheung Min clan. She also had eight brothers and three sisters of concubine birth.

On her paternal side, she was a second cousin once removed of Queen Jeonghyeon, a third cousin once removed of Queen Insu, a third cousin five times removed of Queen Inyeol, and a fifth cousin of Queen Ansun, while on her maternal side, she was a second cousin of Queen Jeongsun.

=== Marriage ===
In 1467, at the age of 10, Lady Han married 9-year-old Yi Hyeol, the younger son of the late Crown Prince Uigyeong and a grandson of the reigning King Sejo.

According to Lady Han's epitaph, it was King Sejo who selected her as a royal bride, but it has also been said that it was actually Yi Hyeol's mother, Crown Princess Su, who sought to make Lady Han her daughter-in-law after seeing her through a window.

In 1470, with Han Myeong-hoe's influence, Yi Hyeol succeeded his uncle, King Yejong — who was also Lady Han's former brother-in-law — and became the ninth monarch of Joseon (posthumously King Seongjong). Lady Han thus became queen. She was strictly educated according to Confucian ethics by her mother-in-law and studied books such as Biographies of Exemplary Women. King Seongjong took concubines when Lady Han couldn't become pregnant, and without despising the women, she presented them with fabrics and jewelry.

In 1473, she moved to her parents' home due to illness and Seongjong visited every other day in order to check on her condition. She later recovered and returned to the palace, but her illness flared up again within months. Because her health did not improve, Lady Han requested to move her residence to Changdeokgung, and Seongjong and the three dowager queens (Jaseong, Insu and Inhye) tended to her. Her parents were also granted permission to enter the palace and look after their daughter; before her death, Lady Han urged them to eat as she knew they had been starving themselves for days while staying by her side.

=== Death ===
Lady Han died without issue, six months before her 18th birthday. She was buried within Sulleung (술릉), today part of the Samneung Cluster in Paju, Gyeonggi Province. Her elder sister, Queen Jangsun, is buried in the same area.

King Seongjong conferred upon her the posthumous name Gonghye (공혜), praising her for obediently and respectfully serving her in-laws ("gong"), and for her generosity, gentleness and benevolence ("hye"). In 1498, during Yeonsangun's reign, Lady Han's posthumous name was enhanced by adding Hwiui Sinsuk (휘의신숙; lit. ''glorious restrain, prudent solemnity'').

== Titles ==
- During the reign of King Sejo (r. 1455–1468):
  - Lady, of the Cheongju Han clan (청주 한씨; 淸州韓氏; from 17 November 1456)
    - Han Myeong-hoe's daughter (한명회의 딸)
    - Lady Han (한씨; 韓氏)
  - Princess Consort Cheonan (천안군부인; 天安郡夫人; from 25 February 1467)
- During the reign of King Seongjong (r. 1470–1495):
  - Queen (왕비; 王妃; from 9 January 1470)
  - Queen Gonghye (공혜왕후; 恭惠王后; from 1474)

== Family ==
- Father: Han Myeong-hoe (한명회), Internal Prince Sangdang (상당부원군; 5 December 1415 – 7 December 1487)
- Mother: Internal Princess Consort Hwangnyeo (황려부부인), of the Yeoheung Min clan (여흥 민씨; ?–1490)
- Sibling(s)
  - Lady, of the Cheongju Han clan (청주 한씨) (Note: Married Shin Ju (신주; 1434–1456) from the Goryeong Shin clan (고령 신씨); eldest son of Shin Suk-ju and half-brother of Sugwon Shin (숙원 신씨; consort of King Sejo). They had issue (3 sons).)
  - Lady, of the Cheongju Han clan (청주 한씨) (Note: Married Yun Ban (윤반), Prince Yeongcheon (영천군; 1442–1502) from the Papyeong Yun clan (파평 윤씨); eldest son of Princess Jeonghyeon (정현옹주; 1425–1480) and grandson of King Sejong. They had issue (2 sons, 5 daughters).)
  - Queen Jangsun (장순왕후), of the Cheongju Han clan (청주 한씨; 3 March 1445 – 14 January 1462)
  - Han Bo (한보), Prince Nangseong (낭성군; 1447–1522) (Note: ▪︎Wife: Lady, of the Hansan Yi clan (한산 이씨); eldest daughter of County Princess Biin (비인현주; 1427–1514) and granddaughter of Grand Prince Hyoryeong. ▪︎Issue: 6 sons, 3 daughters.)
  - Han Bok (한복) (Note: Half-sibling.) (Note: ▪︎Wife: Lady, of the Heungdeok Jang clan (흥덕 장씨).)
  - Han Im (한임) (Note: ▪︎Wife: Lady, of the Jeonju Yi clan (전주 이씨); daughter of Yi Han-gi (이한기).)
  - Han Su (한수) (Note: ▪︎Wife: Lady, of the Andong Gwon clan (안동 권씨).)
  - Han Mok (한목)
  - Han Seok (한석)
  - Han Seo (한서)
  - Han U (한우)
  - Han On (한온)
  - Lady, of the Cheongju Han clan (청주 한씨) (Note: Married Kang Hui-geon (강희건).)
  - Lady, of the Cheongju Han clan (청주 한씨) (Note: Married Shin Seung-son (신승손) from the Pyongsan Shin clan (평산 신씨).)
  - Lady, of the Cheongju Han clan (청주 한씨) (Note: Married Hong Gap-saeng (홍갑생).)
- Husband: King Seongjong (성종대왕; 28 August 1457 – 29 January 1495) — No issue.
  - Biological father-in-law: King Deokjong (덕종대왕; 12 October 1438 – 29 September 1457)
  - Adoptive father-in-law: King Yejong (예종대왕; 23 January 1450 – 9 January 1470)
  - Biological mother-in-law: Queen Sohye (소혜왕후), of the Cheongju Han clan (청주 한씨; 16 October 1437 – 21 May 1504)
  - Adoptive mother-in-law: Queen Ansun (안순왕후), of the Cheongju Han clan (청주 한씨; 27 April 1445 – 12 February 1499)

== Ancestry ==
Ancestors of Queen Gonghye

Han Su (한수)
Han Sang-jil (한상질)
Lady, of the Andong Gwon clan (안동 권씨)
Han Gi (한기)
Song Sin-ui (송신의)
Lady, of the Cheongpung Song clan (청풍 송씨)
Han Myeong-hoe, Internal Prince Sangdang (상당부원군 한명회)
Yi Haeng (이행)
Yi Jeok (이적)
Lady, of the Seosan Ryu clan (서산 류씨)
Lady, of the Yeoju Yi clan (여주 이씨)
Park Gaheung (박가흥)
Lady, of the Suncheon Park clan (순천 박씨)
Queen Gonghye
Min Geun (민근)
Min Jung-rip (민중립)
Lady, of the Andong Gwon clan (안동 권씨)
Min Dae-saeng (민대생)
Heo Jin (허진)
Lady, of the Yangcheon Heo clan (양천 허씨)
Lady, of the Munhwa Yu clan (문화 유씨)
Internal Princess Consort Hwangnyeo, of the Yeoheung Min clan (황려부부인 여흥 민씨)
Heo Gyeong (허경)
Heo Geum (허금)
Lady, of the Juksan Park clan (죽산 박씨)
Lady, of the Yangcheon Heo clan (양천 허씨)

== In popular culture ==
- Portrayed by Choi Jung-won in the 1984–1985 MBC TV series 500 Years of Joseon: The Ume Tree in the Midst of the Snow.
- Portrayed by Kim Eun-hye in the 1994 KBS2 TV series Han Myung Hoe.
- Portrayed by Shin Ji-soo in the 1998–2000 KBS1 TV series The King and the Queen.
- Portrayed by Kim Hee-jung and Han Da-min in the 2007–2008 SBS TV series The King and I.
- Portrayed by Lee Ji-woo in the 2011–2012 JTBC TV series Insu, the Queen Mother.

== See also ==
- History of Korea
- Consort kin
- Styles and titles in Joseon

== Notes ==
Queen Gonghye Cheongju Han clan
Royal titles
Preceded by Queen Ansun of the Cheongju Han	Queen Consort of Joseon; 1470–1474	Succeeded by Queen Yun of the Haman Yun clan
