= Queen Jangsun =

Queen of Joseon (1445–1462)

- Queen Consort of Joseon (posthumously)

Crown Princess of Joseon
- Tenure: 10 May 1460 – 14 January 1462
- Predecessor: Crown Princess Han
- Successor: Crown Princess Shin
- Born: 3 March 1445; Yeonhwa-bang, Hanseong, Joseon
- Died: 14 January 1462 (aged 16); Hanseong, Joseon
- Burial: Gongneung, Samneung Cluster, Paju, South Korea
- Spouse: Crown Prince Hwang (later King Yejong) (m. 1460)
- Issue Detail: 1 son
Posthumous name
- Crown Princess Jangsun (장순빈; 章順嬪) → Queen Hwiin Seodeok Jangsun (휘인소덕장순왕후; 徽仁昭德章順王后)
- Clan: Cheongju Han (by birth); Jeonju Yi (by marriage)
- Dynasty: Yi
- Father: Han Myeong-hoe, Internal Prince Sangdang
- Mother: Internal Princess Consort Hwangnyeo, of the Yeoheung Min clan

Korean name
- Hangul: 장순왕후
- Hanja: 章順王后
- RR: Jangsun wanghu
- MR: Changsun wanghu

Queen Jangsun (Korean: 장순왕후; Hanja: 章順王后; 3 March 1445 – 14 January 1462), (Note: In the Korean calendar (lunisolar), she was born on the 16th day of the 1st lunar month and died on the 5th day of the 12th lunar month.) of the Cheongju Han clan, was the first wife of Crown Prince Hwang (King Yejong), later the eighth monarch of Joseon, and the elder sister of Queen Gonghye. She died due to complications following childbirth, and was posthumously elevated to the position of queen upon the accession to the throne of her brother-in-law, King Seongjong.

== Biography ==
=== Early life and lineage ===
The future Queen Jangsun was born during the reign of King Sejong, as the legitimate third daughter among one son and four daughters. Her father was Han Myeong-hoe, the famed kingmaker who would later become chief state councilor, and her mother was a lady from the illustrious Yeoheung Min clan. She also had eight brothers and three sisters of concubine birth.

On her paternal side, she was a second cousin once removed of Queen Jeonghyeon, a third cousin once removed of Queen Insu, a third cousin five times removed of Queen Inyeol, and a fifth cousin of Queen Ansun, while on her maternal side, she was a second cousin of Queen Jeongsun.

=== Marriage ===
In 1460, at the age of 15, Lady Han married the 10-year-old Yi Hwang (posthumously King Yejong). It is said her gentle attitude and upright demeanor made her a favorite of her father-in-law, King Sejo. On 31 December 1461, she gave birth to her only child, a son named Yi Bun (이분), who didn't survive infancy.

=== Death ===
Lady Han never recovered from childbirth and died two weeks later, shortly before her 17th birthday and more than six years prior to her husband's accession to the throne. She was buried within Gongneung (공릉), today part of the Samneung Cluster in Paju, Gyeonggi Province. Her younger sister, Queen Gonghye, was later buried in the same area.

King Sejo was saddened by the death of his daughter-in-law and conferred upon her the posthumous name Jangsun (장순), defining her as gentle, generous and beautiful ("jang"), and docile, benevolent and compassionate ("sun"). After King Seongjong, her brother-in-law, as well as her husband's nephew and adopted son, took the throne in 1470, Lady Han was posthumously elevated to the position of queen.

== Titles ==
- During the reign of King Sejong (r. 1418–1450):
  - Lady, of the Cheongju Han clan (청주 한씨; 淸州韓氏; from 3 March 1445)
    - Han Myeong-hoe's daughter (한명회의 딸)
    - Lady Han (한씨; 韓氏)
- During the reign of King Sejo (r. 1455–1468):
  - Crown Princess (왕세자빈; 王世子嬪; from 10 May 1460)
  - Crown Princess Jangsun (장순빈; 章順嬪; from 1462)
- During the reign of King Seongjong (r. 1470–1495):
  - Queen Jangsun (장순왕후; 章順王后; from unknown date)

== Family ==
- Father: Han Myeong-hoe (한명회), Internal Prince Sangdang (상당부원군; 5 December 1415 – 7 December 1487)
- Mother: Internal Princess Consort Hwangnyeo (황려부부인), of the Yeoheung Min clan (여흥 민씨; ?–1490)
- Sibling(s)
  - Lady, of the Cheongju Han clan (청주 한씨) (Note: Married Shin Ju (신주; 1434–1456) from the Goryeong Shin clan (고령 신씨); eldest son of Shin Suk-ju and half-brother of Sugwon Shin (숙원 신씨; consort of King Sejo). They had issue (3 sons).)
  - Lady, of the Cheongju Han clan (청주 한씨) (Note: Married Yun Ban (윤반), Prince Yeongcheon (영천군; 1442–1502) from the Papyeong Yun clan (파평 윤씨); eldest son of Princess Jeonghyeon (정현옹주; 1425–1480) and grandson of King Sejong. They had issue (2 sons, 5 daughters).)
  - Han Bo (한보), Prince Nangseong (낭성군; 1447–1522) (Note: ▪︎Wife: Lady, of the Hansan Yi clan (한산 이씨); eldest daughter of County Princess Biin (비인현주; 1427–1514) and granddaughter of Grand Prince Hyoryeong. ▪︎Issue: 6 sons, 3 daughters.)
  - Queen Gonghye (공혜왕후), of the Cheongju Han clan (청주 한씨; 17 November 1456 – 9 May 1474); given name Song-yi (송이)
  - Han Bok (한복) (Note: Half-sibling.) (Note: ▪︎Wife: Lady, of the Heungdeok Jang clan (흥덕 장씨).)
  - Han Im (한임) (Note: ▪︎Wife: Lady, of the Jeonju Yi clan (전주 이씨); daughter of Yi Han-gi (이한기).)
  - Han Su (한수) (Note: ▪︎Wife: Lady, of the Andong Gwon clan (안동 권씨).)
  - Han Mok (한목)
  - Han Seok (한석)
  - Han Seo (한서)
  - Han U (한우)
  - Han On (한온)
  - Lady, of the Cheongju Han clan (청주 한씨) (Note: Married Kang Hui-geon (강희건).)
  - Lady, of the Cheongju Han clan (청주 한씨) (Note: Married Shin Seung-son (신승손) from the Pyongsan Shin clan (평산 신씨).)
  - Lady, of the Cheongju Han clan (청주 한씨) (Note: Married Hong Gap-saeng (홍갑생).)
- Husband: King Yejong (예종대왕; 23 January 1450 – 9 January 1470)
  - Father-in-law: King Sejo (세조대왕; 11 November 1417 – 2 October 1468)
  - Mother-in-law: Queen Jeonghui (정희왕후), of the Papyeong Yun clan (파평 윤씨; 25 December 1418 – 15 May 1483)
- Issue
  - Yi Bun (이분), Grand Prince Inseong (인성대군; 31 December 1461 – 4 December 1463)

== Ancestry ==
Ancestors of Queen Jangsun

Han Su (한수)
Han Sang-jil (한상질)
Lady, of the Andong Gwon clan (안동 권씨)
Han Gi (한기)
Song Sin-ui (송신의)
Lady, of the Cheongpung Song clan (청풍 송씨)
Han Myeong-hoe, Internal Prince Sangdang (상당부원군 한명회)
Yi Haeng (이행)
Yi Jeok (이적)
Lady, of the Seosan Ryu clan (서산 류씨)
Lady, of the Yeoju Yi clan (여주 이씨)
Park Gaheung (박가흥)
Lady, of the Suncheon Park clan (순천 박씨)
Queen Jangsun
Min Geun (민근)
Min Jung-rip (민중립)
Lady, of the Andong Gwon clan (안동 권씨)
Min Dae-saeng (민대생)
Heo Jin (허진)
Lady, of the Yangcheon Heo clan (양천 허씨)
Lady, of the Munhwa Yu clan (문화 유씨)
Internal Princess Consort Hwangnyeo, of the Yeoheung Min clan (황려부부인 여흥 민씨)
Heo Gyeong (허경)
Heo Geum (허금)
Lady, of the Juksan Park clan (죽산 박씨)
Lady, of the Yangcheon Heo clan (양천 허씨)

== In popular culture ==
- Portrayed by Park In-na in the 1994 KBS2 TV series Han Myung Hoe.
- Inspired a fictional crown princess portrayed by Han Chae-ah in the 2021 KBS2 TV series The King's Affection.

== See also ==
- Styles and titles in Joseon
- History of Korea
