= Cheongju Han clan =

Korean noble family

Cheongju Han clan 청주 한씨
- Current region: Korea
- Origin: Cheongju
- Founder: Han Ran
- Connected members: Queen Sinui; Han Hwak; Han Myŏnghoe; Queen Insu; Queen Jangsun; Queen Ansun; Queen Gonghye; Queen Inyeol; Han Yong-un; Han Duck-soo; Han Myeong-sook; Han Seung-soo; Han Terra
- Motto: Royalty, humility, sincerity, frugality 충효덕례 근금공검 忠孝德禮 勤謹恭儉
- Website: cheongjuhan.net

The Cheongju Han clan (Korean: 청주 한씨) is a Korean clan best known for their many influential female members, including six queens. It was one of the most prominent clans in Goryeo and Joseon. Currently, the Cheongju Han is known as a clan that has long been prominent in South Korean politics, public service, business and arts.

== Origin ==
The members of the Cheongju Han clan claim descent from the sage Jizi (or Kija), a noble from the Shang dynasty who rode his white horse and set a nation in "the farthest east". They are said to be the descendants of Urang (友諒), the son of King Jun, the last monarch of the Kija period, during the ancient Gojoseon state. The founder of the Cheongju Han clan is Han Ran (한란; 韓蘭; 853–916), the 32nd descendant of Urang.

== History ==
The clan provided the largest number of generals during the Joseon period. It is also well known for producing consorts for the royal family. They had produced six queens, five princesses consort, three royal consorts, 315 scholars, 12 Sangshin, 14 Gongshin, and 1 Daejejak throughout Joseon.

A member of this clan was Queen Insu, wife of Crown Prince Uigyeong, and the first female author in Korean history, who wrote Naehun, a Confucian morality guidebook for women.

== Genealogy book ==
The Cheongju Han's genealogy records (jokbo; 族譜) written by Han Hyo-jung, Han Hyuk and others in 1617, is considered important bibliographically. In addition, the overall system and recording method are different from other genealogies, having a feature that places great importance on royal records.

== Living members ==
- Han Seung-soo (born 1936), 39th Prime Minister of South Korea
- Han Sung-joo (born 1940), South Korean educator, diplomat and politician
- Han Myeong-sook (born 1944), 37th Prime Minister of South Korea
- Han Duck-soo (born 1949), 38th and 48th Prime Minister and former Acting President of South Korea
- Han Min-goo (born 1953), South Korean politician and general
- Han Kang (born 1970), South Korean writer
- Han Dong-hoon (born 1973), South Korean politician
- Han Terra (born 1982), South Korean inventor and musician
- Han (Han Ji-sung) (born 2000), South Korean producer, rapper, singer and dancer. Member of the popular K-Pop group Stray Kids
- Keiko Matsuzaka (born 1957), Japanese actress and daughter of Hideaki Matsuzaka, who was born Han Yeong-myeong (韓英明)

== Royalty of the Ming dynasty ==
- Consort Kanghuizhuangshuli — consort of the Yongle Emperor
- Madame Gongshen (恭慎夫人) — younger sister of Consort Kanghuizhuangshuli; consort of the Xuande Emperor

== Royalty of Joseon ==
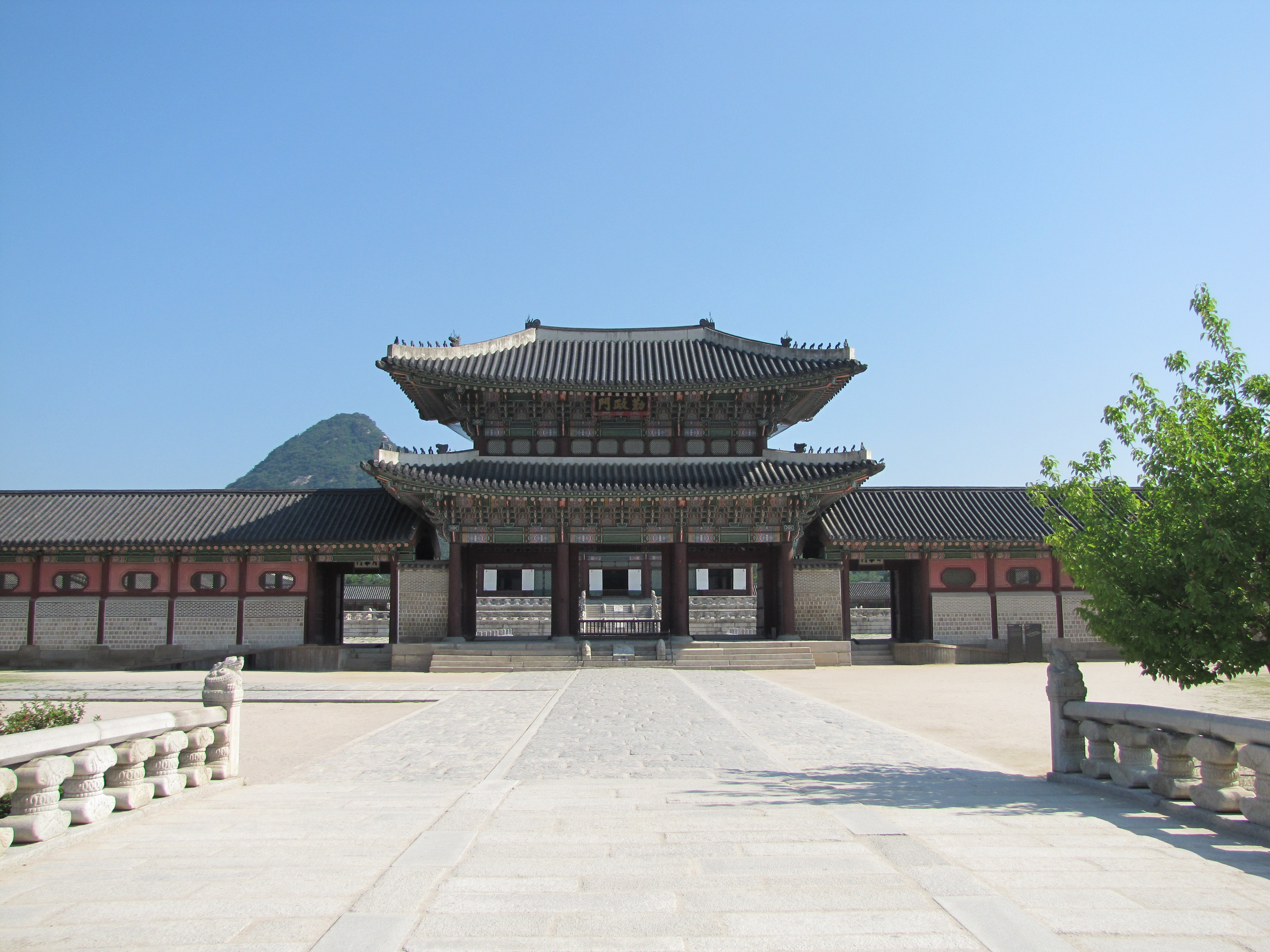
Changgyeonggung, Seoul. Built in early Joseon for King Taejong, it was renovated and enlarged in 1483 for the three dowager queens: Queen Jeonghui, Queen Sohye, and Queen Ansun

- Queen Sinui
- Queen Jangsun
- Queen Sohye (commonly known as Queen Insu)
- Queen Ansun
- Queen Gonghye
- Queen Inyeol
- Gwiin Han (귀인 한씨) — consort of King Jungjong and niece of Queen Ansun
- Sugui Han (숙의 한씨) — consort of King Myeongjong
- Onbin Han / Concubine On (온빈 한씨) — consort of King Seonjo

== See also ==
- Korean nobility
- Bone-rank system
- Yangban
- House of Yi
- Styles and titles in Joseon
- Consort kin
- Imperial Chinese harem system
