= Seungpyeong Budaebuin =

Princess Consort of Joseon (1455–1506)

Seungpyeong Budaebuin 승평부대부인
- Grand Internal Princess Consort of Joseon

Princess consort of Joseon
- Tenure: 1466 – ?
- Coronation: 1466

Grand Internal Princess Consort of Joseon
- Tenure: ? – 20 July 1506
- Predecessor: Grand Internal Princess Consort Nakrang
- Successor: Grand Internal Princess Consort Hadong
- Born: 10 March 1455; Joseon
- Died: 20 July 1506 (aged 51); Grand Prince Wolsan's manor, Joseon
- Burial: After 1506; Grand Prince Wolsan's Mausoleum; San 16–35, Sinwon-dong, Deokyang-gu, Goyang-si, Gyeonggi-do
- Spouse: Grand Prince Wolsan (m. 1466–1488)
Regnal name
- Princess Consort Sangwon (상원군부인, 祥原郡夫人); Princess Consort Seungpyeong (승평부부인, 昇平府夫人); Grand Internal Princess Consort Seungpyeong (승평부대부인, 昇平府大夫人)
- House: Suncheon Park (by birth); House of Yi (by marriage)
- Father: Park Jung-seon
- Mother: Lady Heo of the Yangcheon Heo clan
- Religion: Buddhism

- Seungpyeong Budaebuin
- Hangul: 승평 부대부인
- Hanja: 昇平府大夫人
- RR: Seungpyeong budaebuin
- MR: Sŭngp'yŏng pudaebuin

Grand Internal Princess Consort Seungpyeong (Korean: 승평부대부인 박씨; Hanja: 昇平府大夫人 朴氏; 10 March 1455 – 20 July 1506), of the Suncheon Park clan, was a Korean Joseon dynasty royal family member though her marriage with Grand Prince Wolsan, the oldest son of Deokjong of Joseon and Queen Sohye. She was the older sister of Park Won-jong and the maternal aunt of King Jungjong's second wife, Queen Janggyeong.

== Biography ==
=== Early life ===
Lady Park was born on 10 March 1455 to Park Jong-seon and his wife, Lady Heo of the Yangcheon Heo clan during King Danjong's last year of reign. Lady Park was the third eldest within seven siblings, including Park Won-jong. Through her paternal grandmother, she was a great-granddaughter of Sim On and a grandniece of Queen Soheon, the wife of King Sejong.

=== Marriage and Later Life ===
On 19 August 1466, the eleven year old Lady Park married the ten year old Grand Prince Wolsan. The grand prince was the eldest son of Crown Prince Uigyeong and Crown Princess Su (the future Queen Dowager Insu). She also became the sister-in-law to Princess Myeongsuk and Grand Prince Jalsan.

Upon her marriage, she was given the title of Princess Consort Sangwon (상원군부인; 祥原郡夫人) with the rank of Senior 1 (정1품). When her brother-in-law, King Seongjong, ascended to the throne, she became Princess Consort Seungpyeong (승평부부인; 昇平府夫人) with the same rank. Her last title would be given within her scandal.

During her marriage, she did not have any children of her own, but she gained a stepson in 1485 through her husband's concubine, Lady Kim of the Wonju Kim clan. Although, her family registry states that the Princess Consort had the child herself.

She outlived Grand Prince Wolsan by 18 years who died on 21 December 1488.

Her third younger sister married Queen Jeonghui's grandnephew, Yun Yeo-pil of the Paepyeong Yun clan, and became the mother of Yun Im and Yun Myeong-hye, the second wife of King Jungjong. Since her younger sister died at an early age after giving birth, she had raised her young niece, Yun Myeong-hye, as if she was her daughter.

The princess consort’s stepson would eventually marry her paternal niece, who was the eldest daughter of her third younger sister and Yun Myeong-hye’s eldest sister.

The Princess consort later became the sister-in-law to Grand Prince Jean, the son of Queen Ansun and King Yejong, when her youngest sister married him.

=== Scandal and Death ===
It was said that the Princess consort had an outstanding beauty of her time, and had many scandals surrounding her.

Prince Yeonsan, her nephew-in-law, frequently visited her residence in Deoksugung, due to her husband's frequent sickness and because of this, Princess Consort Sangwon had raised him and became his foster mother. It was said that at some point Yeonsangun, who later became king, invited and brought the Princess Consort to live within the palace. The king also gave his old residence to the Princess Consort and visited her frequently. His visitations eventually caused a scandal spreading that Yeonsangun had committed adultery with her.

In addition, Yeonsangun put the character '大' (Dae; 대) in front of Princess Seungpyeong's name; creating the title of Grand Internal Princess Consort Seungpyeong (승평부대부인, 昇平府大夫人) with the same Senior rank.

Another rumor was that Yeonsangun had a long spear placed in the grave of Grand Prince Wolsan and was surprised to see his uncle appearing in his dream while sleeping in the same room with the Princess consort.

Her younger brother had planned to do a rebellion against the king, but during Yeonsangun's 12th year of reign, the Grand Princess died within Gyeongun Palace on 20 July 1506 at the age of 51. She was then buried in the same tomb of her husband's mausoleum.

There was a theory that she drank poison and committed suicide. In the Annals of the Joseon Dynasty, it is recorded that people at the time said that she conceived a child with Yeonsangun and later committed suicide because of it. However, there is an argument that Park was over fifty at the time, so it cannot be said that she had a child and committed suicide. There were also opinions that Park Won-jong, who was one of the masterminds behind the rebellion against King Yeonsan, fabricated the incident with fake evidence between his eldest sister’s and Yeonsangun’s relationship to justify his rebellion.

== Family ==
- Father
  - Park Jung-seon (박중선; 朴仲善; 1435–1481)
- Mother
  - Lady Heo of the Yangcheon Heo clan (양천 허씨; 1430–?)
- Siblings
  - Older sister - Lady Park of the Suncheon Park clan (순천 박씨; 順天 朴氏; 1445–?)
  - Older sister - Lady Park of the Suncheon Park clan (순천 박씨; 順天 朴氏; 1450–1500)
  - Younger sister - Lady Park of the Suncheon Park clan (순천 박씨; 順天 朴氏; 1459–?)
  - Younger brother - Park Won-jong (박원종; 朴元宗; 1467–1510)
  - Younger sister - Lady Park of the Suncheon Park clan (순천 박씨; 順天 朴氏; 1469–?)
  - Younger sister - Internal Princess Consort Suncheon of the Suncheon Park clan (순천부부인 순천 박씨; 順天府夫人 順天 朴氏; 1470–1498)
  - Younger sister - Princess Consort Seungpyeong of the Suncheon Park clan (승평부부인 순천 박씨; 昇平府夫人 順天朴氏; 1472–?)
- Husband
  - Yi Jeong, Grand Prince Wolsan (월산대군 이정; 月山大君 李婷; 5 January 1454 – 22 January 1488)
    - Mother-in-law - Queen Sohye of the Cheongju Han clan (7 October 1437 – 11 May 1504)
    - Father-in-law - Yi Jang, King Deokjong (조선 덕종; 3 October 1438 – 20 September 1457)
- Issue
  - Step son - Yi Yi, Prince Deokpung (덕풍군 이이; 德豊君 李恞; 20 August 1485 – 26 March 1506)
    - Step daughter-in-law - Princess Papyeong of the Papyeong Yun clan (파평현부인 윤씨; 坡平縣夫人 尹氏; 1485 – 16 January 1536); Queen Janggyeong's older sister
      - Step grandson - Yi Ju, Prince Parim (파림군 이주; 坡林君 李珘; 1500–1541)
      - Step grandson - Yi Yu, Prince Gyerim (계림군 이유; 桂林君 李瑠; 1503–1545)
      - Unnamed step grandson (1504–?)
      - Step grandson - Yi Ri (이리; 李璃; 5 December 1506 – 7 July 1545)

== In popular culture ==
- Portrayed by Uhm Yoo-shin in the 1984–1985 MBC TV Series The Ume Tree in the Midst of the Snow.
- Portrayed by Kim Young-ae in the 1987 Film Diary of King Yeonsan.
- Portrayed by Yang Mi-kyung in the 1995 KBS2 TV Series Jang Noksu.
- Portrayed by Lee Duk-hee in the 1998–2000 KBS1 TV Series The King and the Queen.
- Portrayed by Yoon Young-joo and Jeon Hee-soo in the 2011–2012 JTBC TV series Insu, the Queen Mother.
