= Grand Prince Wolsan =

Korean prince (1454–1488)

Grand Prince Wŏlsan 월산대군

Prince of Joseon
- Reign: 1460–1470
- Successor: Prince Jalsan

Grand Prince of Joseon
- Reign: 1470–1488
- Successor: Grand Prince Jalsan
- Born: 18 December 1454; Grand Prince Suyang's manor, Hanseong-bu, Joseon
- Died: 21 December 1488 (aged 34); Grand Prince Wŏlsan's manor, Hanseong-bu, Joseon
- Burial: After 1488; Grand Prince Wŏlsan's Mausoleum; San 16–35, Sinwon-dong, Deokyang-gu, Goyang-si, Gyeonggi-do
- Spouse: Grand Princess Consort Seungpyeong (m. 1466–1488)
- Issue: Yi Yi, Prince Deokpung
- House: Jeonju Yi
- Father: Deokjong of Joseon
- Mother: Queen Sohye
- Religion: Confucianism, later Buddhism

Korean name
- Hangul: 이정
- Hanja: 李婷
- RR: I Jeong
- MR: I Chŏng

Royal title
- Hangul: 월산대군
- Hanja: 月山大君
- RR: Wolsan daegun
- MR: Wŏlsan taegun

Art name
- Hangul: 풍월정
- Hanja: 風月亭
- RR: Pungwoljeong
- MR: P'ungwŏlchŏng

Courtesy name
- Hangul: 자미
- Hanja: 子美
- RR: Jami
- MR: Chami

Posthumous name
- Hangul: 공간, 효문
- Hanja: 恭簡, 孝文
- RR: Gonggan, Hyomun
- MR: Konggan, Hyomun

Grand Prince Wŏlsan (Korean: 월산대군; Hanja: 月山大君; 18 December 1454 – 21 December 1488) was a Korean Royal Prince as the oldest son of Deokjong of Joseon and Queen Sohye. His personal name was Yi Chŏng (이정; 李婷).

He became a Grand Prince in 1470. Even his father was honoured as King Uigyeong (의경왕) in 1470, Great King Hoegan (회간대왕) in 1475, and given temple name Deokjong (덕종), the Prince didn't succeed his father as a Crown Prince. Later, he built a villa in his hometown in Bukchon and spent his life reading books and writing poetry there.

== Biography ==
=== Early life and marriage ===
The Prince was born on 18 December 1454 as the oldest son of Crown Prince Uigyeong and Crown Princess Han of the Cheongju Han clan, he was also the oldest grandson of King Sejo. When the Prince was young, he grew up under the love of his grandfather. In 1457, his father died suddenly, then he was raised in the court by his grandfather.

In 1460 (6th year reign of his grandfather), he was appointed as Prince Wŏlsan (월산군; 月山君). When his uncle, Yejong of Joseon died suddenly at the young age, his little brother was appointed as the new King for succeeded him and then, he was appointed as Grand Prince Wŏlsan (월산대군; 月山大君).

On 19 August 1466, when the Prince was 9 year old, he then married Lady Pak, the daughter of Pak Chungsŏn (박중선) from the Suncheon Park clan and Lady Hŏ (부인 허씨) of the Yangcheon Heo clan. Lady Pak was one year older than the Prince.

=== Later life ===
After his death, Seongjong firstly gave him a posthumous name as Konggan (공간; 恭簡) then changed into Hyomun (효문; 孝文). After his death, the Prince was buried in 427, Sinwon-ri, Wondang-myeon, Goyang-gun, Gyeonggi Province (now is Sinwon-dong, Deokyang-gu, Goyang-si, South Korea) alongside his wife, Grand Princess Consort Seungpyeong. His concubine, Lady Kim (부인 김씨) was also buried nearby from his. His tombstone was written by Im Sahong (임사홍) in 1498 (4th year reign of Yeonsangun of Joseon).

== Others ==
=== Arts ===
The Prince often wrote some poems such as:

1. Kukchosisan (국조시산; 國朝詩刪)
2. Tongmunsŏn (동문선; 東文選)
3. Yŏjisŭngnam (여지승람; 輿地勝覽)
4. Taedongsirim (대동시림; 大東詩林)
5. P'ungwŏljŏngjip (풍월정집; 風月亭集); was published by King Seongjong to the Ming dynasty after his death

And his other poems were also introduced to Ming dynasty and some of them were added to the Chŏnusanyŏljo Poetry Book (전우산열조시집; 錢虞山列朝詩集) in China.

=== Cultural properties ===
- The Taesil of Grand Prince Wolsan (월산대군 태실) – 291–1, Umyeon-dong, Seocho-gu, Seoul, South Korea (Seoul Metropolitan Monument No. 30).
- The Military Temple of Grand Prince Wolsan (월산대군사당) – 427, Sinwon-dong, Deokyang-gu, Goyang-si, Gyeonggi Province, South Korea (Gyeonggi-do Cultural Heritage Data No. 79).
- The Tomb and Sindo Monument of Grand Prince Wolsan (월산대군 묘 및 신도비) – San 16–35, Sinwon-dong, Deokyang-gu, Goyang-si, Gyeonggi Province, South Korea (Goyang City Local Historic Site No. 1).

== Family ==
- Father: Deokjong of Joseon (1438 – 2 September 1457)
- Mother: Queen Sohye of the Cheongju Han clan (7 October 1437 – 11 May 1504)

Sibling(s):

1. Younger sister: Yi Gyeong-geun, Princess Myeongsuk (1456 – 4 October 1482)
2. Younger brother: Yi Hyeol, Grand Prince Jalsan (이혈 잘산대군; 19 August 1457 – 20 January 1494)
- Consort(s) and their respective issue(s):
1. Grand Princess Consort Seungpyeong of the Suncheon Park clan (승평부부인 박씨; 1455 – 20 July 1506) – No issue.
2. Grand Princess Consort of the Wonju Kim clan (부부인 원주 김씨)
  1. Son: Yi Yi, Prince Deokpung (이이 덕풍군; 20 August 1485 – 26 March 1506)

== In popular culture ==
- Portrayed by Im-ho in the 1994 KBS2 TV series Han Myunghoi.
- Portrayed by Shin Kwi-hik in the 1995 KBS2 TV Series Jang Noksu.
- Portrayed by Song Ho-seop and Lee-in in the 1998–2000 KBS1 TV Series The King and the Queen.
- Portrayed by Jang Hee-woong, Ahn Hyun-joon, Wi Hun-tae and Lee Ji-oh in the 2011–2012 JTBC TV series Insu, the Queen Mother.
