= Queen Jeonghui =

Queen of Joseon from 1455 to 1468

Grand Queen Dowager of Joseon
- Tenure: 9 January 1470 – 15 May 1483
- Predecessor: None
- Successor: Grand Queen Dowager Inhye; Grand Queen Dowager Insu

Regent of Joseon
- Tenure: 9 January 1470 (Note: In an unofficial capacity from 1468 to 1470.) – 17 February 1476
- Monarch: Seongjong

Queen Dowager of Joseon
- Tenure: 1 October 1468 – 9 January 1469
- Predecessor: Queen Dowager Uideok
- Successor: Queen Dowager Inhye; Queen Dowager Insu (from 1475)

Queen Consort of Joseon
- Tenure: 4 July 1455 – 1 October 1468
- Predecessor: Queen Jeongsun
- Successor: Queen Ansun
- Born: 25 December 1418; Hongju-mok, Chungcheong Province, Joseon
- Died: 15 May 1483 (aged 64); Onyang Haenggung, (Note: Korean: 온양행궁; Hanja: 溫陽行宮; lit. ''Onyang Temporary Palace'') Asan-hyeon, Chungcheong Province, Joseon
- Burial: Gwangneung, Namyangju, South Korea
- Spouse: King Sejo (m. 1428; died 1468)
- Issue Detail: 2 sons, 2 daughters
Regnal name
- Jaseong Heumin Gyeongdeok Seonyeol Myeongsun Wonsuk Hwisin Hyeui Sinheon (자성흠인경덕선열명순원숙휘신혜의신헌; 慈聖欽仁景德宣烈明順元淑徽愼惠懿神憲) (Note: Known as honorific name (존호; 尊號) in the Sinosphere, its closest equivalent in the English-speaking world is the regnal name.)
Posthumous name
- Queen Jeonghui (정희왕후; 貞熹王后)
- Clan: Papyeong Yun (by birth); Jeonju Yi (by marriage)
- Dynasty: Yi
- Father: Yun Beon, Internal Prince Papyeong
- Mother: Grand Internal Princess Consort Heungnyeong, of the Incheon Yi clan
- Religion: Buddhism

Korean name
- Hangul: 정희왕후
- Hanja: 貞熹王后
- RR: Jeonghui wanghu
- MR: Chŏnghŭi wanghu

Queen Jeonghui (Korean: 정희왕후; Hanja: 貞熹王后; 25 December 1418 – 15 May 1483), of the Papyeong Yun clan, was the wife of King Sejo, the seventh monarch of Joseon, and the mother of Crown Prince Uigyeong and King Yejong. She was queen of Joseon from 1455 until her husband's death in 1468, and was then styled as Queen Dowager Jaseong during the reign of her son, and as Grand Queen Dowager Jaseong during the reign of her grandson, King Seongjong.

Queen Jeonghui was the first Joseon royal consort to receive the title of grand queen dowager and to serve as regent. She initially took over governing during the brief reign of her sickly second son, and subsequently continued to fulfill the role following the accession to the throne of her young grandson.

In contrast to her later counterparts — such as her distant niece, Queen Munjeong — whose legacies are marked by tales of tyranny and/or relentless factional warfare, Queen Jeonghui earned a favorable reputation in Korean history, being remembered as an influential, yet remarkably pragmatic woman who chose to step down gracefully rather than cling to power.

== Biography ==
=== Early life and lineage ===
The future Queen Jeonghui was born during the reign of King Sejong, as the youngest daughter and ninth child among three sons and seven daughters. Her father was Yun Beon (윤번) and her mother was a lady from the formerly dominant Incheon Yi clan.

Her paternal grandmother was a niece of Empress Gwon (권황후), the wife of Biligtü Khan, while her maternal grandmother was a niece of Consort Geun, making Lady Yun a first cousin twice times removed of King Chang of Goryeo. Furthermore, via her great-great-great-grandfather, Yun An-suk (윤안숙), she was a first cousin three times removed of Consort Hui and a second cousin twice removed of her son, King Chungjeong of Goryeo.

The three other Papyeong Yun queens all descended from her great-grandfather, Yun Cheok (윤척). Queen Janggyeong and Yun Im were the great-grandchildren of Lady Yun's elder brother, Yun Sa-yun (윤사윤); Queen Munjeong and Yun Won-hyeong were the great-great-grandchildren of her younger brother, Yun Sa-heun (윤사흔); and Queen Jeonghyeon was a great-granddaughter of her first cousin once removed, Yun Gon (윤곤).

Lady Yun was also a first cousin once removed of two of King Munjong's consorts, Concubine Suk and Soyong Yun (소용 윤씨), as well as of Kang Ja-sun (강자순), the husband of Princess Gyeongsuk, and Yun U (윤우) and Yun Am (윤암), the husbands of Princess Suknyong (숙녕옹주) and Princess Sukkyong (숙경옹주), King Taejong's 10th and 16th daughters, respectively.

=== Marriage ===
In 1428, shortly before her tenth birthday, Lady Yun married 11-year-old Grand Prince Suyang (then known as Grand Prince Jinpyeong), the second son of King Sejong and Queen Soheon. According to the unofficial history Songwa Japseol (송와잡설) compiled by Yi Gi (이기; 1522–1600), it was one of Lady Yun's elder sisters who was initially chosen as a royal bride.

Lady Yun was greatly favored by her parents-in-law, and in 1438, she was allowed to give birth in the palace to her first son, Yi Jang. In 1441, a daughter was born, followed by a second son, Yi Hwang, in 1450. However, upon Queen Soheon's death, records note that Suyang had "one son and two daughters", so it is presumed that Lady Yun had given birth to another daughter before 1446.

Her father-in-law, King Sejong, died in 1450, and her brother-in-law, King Munjong, followed two years later. Consequently, Suyang's nephew, the 11-year-old King Danjong, acceded to the throne in 1452.

In 1453, Suyang launched a coup d'état that came to be known as the Gyeyu Purge (계유정난). It is said that when information regarding the coup leaked, Grand Prince Suyang hesitated to continue; it was Lady Yun who personally helped him put on his armor and encouraged him to proceed with his plans. He then eliminated Hwangbo In and Kim Jong-seo, and installed himself as chief state councilor.

In 1455, Suyang forced the young and weak King Danjong to abdicate, and acceded to the throne himself (posthumously King Sejo). Lady Yun thus became queen. This power shift paved the way for the Papyeong Yun clan's future ascendancy.

=== As queen ===
Lady Yun was regarded as intelligent and politically astute, with knowledge of affairs within and outside the palace. During her tenure, order returned to the internal court for the first time since the death of Queen Soheon a decade earlier.

Tragically, only two years after Sejo's accession, their elder son, Yi Jang (posthumously Crown Prince Uigyeong), suddenly died. Lady Yun then orchestrated a number of schemes in order to convince Sejo to choose their younger son, 8-year-old Yi Hwang, as his successor. This move strained the relationship between Lady Yun and her daughter-in-law, Lady Han, whose firm belief was that her and Crown Prince Uigyeong's son, Yi Chong, was the best choice for the position of heir.

=== Widowhood and regency ===
In 1468, as his health deteriorated, Sejo abdicated in favor of Yi Hwang (posthumously King Yejong), and Lady Yun became queen dowager. Sejo died a day later. Because Yejong was frail and sickly, the officials supported Lady Yun in taking over governing. She oversaw all civil and military matters on behalf of the king, which allowed her to appoint her own people to important positions. She was the third woman since the founding of the dynasty to wield such tremendous power after Queen Sindeok and Queen Wongyeong, but the first to do so from the position of queen dowager.

In 1470, roughly a year after his accession, Yejong died unexpectedly days before his twentieth birthday without having named his successor, and another fierce strife ensued within the court. Lady Yun designated Yi Hyeol, the younger son of the late Crown Prince Uigyeong, as the new king (posthumously King Seongjong), rather than Yejong's only surviving son, Yi Hyeon (이현), or Crown Prince Uigyeong's elder son, Yi Chong. The reasons cited were that Yi Hyeon was too young (not yet 4 years old), while Yi Chong had been in poor health from a young age. However, it is highly likely that Yi Hyeol being married to a daughter of Han Myeong-hoe, who had played a major role in Sejo's coup, contributed to Lady Yun's decision. It seems she judged it more advantageous to bring the powerful Han Myeong-hoe to her side given the unstable political situation.

Concerned about Seongjong's legitimacy, Lady Yun also had Crown Prince Uigyeong posthumously honored as king and elevated Lady Han to the position of queen (commonly known as Queen Insu), later even declaring her status as higher than that of Queen Dowager Inhye, the widow of King Yejong.

As Seongjong was only 12 at the time of his accession, Lady Yun continued to manage state affairs in the king's stead, but in a formal capacity this time. When the officials initially requested that she become regent, Lady Yun refused, arguing that her daughter-in-law, Lady Han, was literate (Note: Being literate refers to knowledge of hanja.) and would be more suitable than herself. Nevertheless, it was the convention at the time to have the most senior elder in the palace act as regent and she eventually accepted the role, although she didn't take the lead outright. She instead chose to discuss matters with her grandson and offer advice based on the experience accumulated over the years, particularly throughout King Sejo's reign.

During Lady Yun's regency, diplomatic relations with the Ming dynasty peaked, with trade flourishing between the two countries. Furthermore, a significant move was made to have the commoner farmers receive the right to cultivate fields that had originally belonged to the military. In 1474, the State Code, which was first ordered by King Sejo, was completed and put into effect. As a patron of the arts and Buddhism, she also commissioned Buddhist paintings and sutras.

=== Later life and death ===
While Lady Yun's regency officially ended when her grandson reached adulthood in 1476, it is said that Seongjong handled most of the duties himself from around the time he turned 15. She had successfully served as a steadying force during a fragile transitional era, but from then on, Lady Yun mostly withdrew from palace affairs. Her final exercise of authority was actively spearheading the deposition and eventual execution of Seongjong's second wife, Queen Yun.

In 1483, she contracted the flu while visiting the hot springs at Onyang and died shortly thereafter, at the age of 64. She was buried alongside King Sejo within Gwangneung (광릉) in present-day Namyangju, Gyeonggi Province.

After Lady Yun's death, political power shifted into the hands of Queen Insu and her natal family, the Cheongju Han clan.

== Titles ==
- During the reign of King Sejong (r. 1418–1450):
  - Lady, of the Papyeong Yun clan (파평 윤씨; 坡平尹氏; from 25 December 1418)
    - Yun Beon's daughter (윤번의 딸)
    - Lady Yun (윤씨; 尹氏)
  - Grand Princess Consort of Samhan State (삼한국대부인; 三韓國大夫人; from 28 November 1428)
  - Grand Internal Princess Consort Nakrang (낙랑부대부인; 樂浪府大夫人; from unknown date)
- During the reign of King Sejo (r. 1455–1468):
  - Queen (왕비; 王妃; from 4 July 1455)
- During the reign of King Yejong (r. 1468–1470):
  - Queen Dowager Jaseong (자성왕대비; 慈聖王太妃; from 1 October 1468)
- During the reign of King Seongjong (r. 1470–1495):
  - Grand Queen Dowager Jaseong (자성대왕대비; 慈聖大王大妃; from 9 January 1470)
  - Queen Jeonghui (정희왕후; 貞熹王后; from 1483)

== Family ==
- Father: Yun Beon (윤번), Internal Prince Papyeong (파평부원군; 1384–1448)
- Mother: Grand Internal Princess Consort Heungnyeong (흥녕부대부인), of the Incheon Yi clan (인천 이씨; 1383–1456)
- Sibling(s)
  - Lady, of the Papyeong Yun clan (파평 윤씨; 1399–?) (Note: Married Hong Won-yong (홍원용; ?–1466) from the Namyang Hong clan (남양 홍씨); maternal uncle of Queen Insu.)
  - Yun Sa-bun (윤사분; 1401–1471) (Note: ▪︎Wife: Lady, of the Haepung Jang clan (해풍 장씨); daughter of Jang An-ji (장안지). ▪︎Issue: 1 son.)
  - Lady, of the Papyeong Yun clan (파평 윤씨; 1403–?) (Note: Married Seong Bong-jo (성봉조; 1401–1475) from the Changnyeong Seong clan (창녕 성씨); second cousin once removed of Seong Sam-mun. They had issue (1 son).)
  - Lady, of the Papyeong Yun clan (파평 윤씨; 1405–?) (Note: Married Yi Yeon-son (이연손; 1404–1463) from thr Gyeongju Yi clan (경주 이씨).)
  - Yun Sa-yun (윤사윤; 1409 – 7 December 1461) (Note: ▪︎Wife: Lady, of the Suwon Choe clan (수원 최씨); daughter of Choe Ui-geom (최의검). ▪︎Issue: 1 son; among his descendants are Queen Janggyeong and Yun Im (great-grandchildren).)
  - Lady, of the Papyeong Yun clan (파평 윤씨; 1410–?) (Note: Married Yi Yeom-ui (이염의; 1409–1492) from the Asan Yi clan (아산 이씨).)
  - Lady, of the Papyeong Yun clan (파평 윤씨; 1412–?) (Note: Married No Deok-gi (노덕기; 1414–1479) from the Gwangju No clan (광주 노씨).)
  - Lady, of the Papyeong Yun clan (파평 윤씨; 1417–?) (Note: Married Han Gye-mi (한계미; 1421–1471) from the Cheongju Han clan (청주 한씨); second cousin of Han Myeong-hoe and maternal uncle of Sugui Shin.)
  - Yun Sa-heun (윤사흔; 1422 – 13 May 1485) (Note: ▪︎Wife: Lady, of the Gyerim Kim clan (계림 김씨); daughter of Kim Ja-on (김자온). ▪︎Issue: 5 sons; among his descendants are Queen Munjeong, Yun Won-hyeong (great-great-grandchildren) and Concubine Suk (숙빈 윤씨; consort of King Injong) (great-great-great-granddaughter).)
- Husband: King Sejo (세조대왕; 11 November 1417 – 2 October 1468)
  - Father-in-law: King Sejong (세종대왕; 15 May 1397 – 8 April 1450)
  - Mother-in-law: Queen Soheon (소헌왕후), of the Cheongsong Shim clan (청송 심씨; 20 October 1395 – 28 April 1446)
- Issue
  - Yi Jang (이장), Crown Prince Uigyeong (의경세자; 12 October 1438 – 29 September 1457)
  - Princess Uisuk (의숙공주; 1441 – 15 January 1478) (Note: Married Jeong Hyeon-jo (정현조), Prince Consort Haseong (하성위; 1440–1504) from the Hadong Jeong clan (하동 정씨); second son of Jeong In-ji. They had no issue.)
  - Princess Uiryeong (의령공주); given name Se-hui (세희) — Disputed. (Note: She is only mentioned in an unofficial history called Geumgye Pildam (금계필담) written in 1873 by Seo Yu-yeong (서유영). The sole reference at her existence in an official document is a passage from the Veritable Records of the Joseon Dynasty, where Grand Prince Suyang (as Sejo was still known at the time) is recorded as having "one son and two daughters" [Sejong Sillok, year 28].)
  - Yi Hwang (이황), King Yejong (예종대왕; 23 January 1450 – 9 January 1470)

== Ancestry ==
Ancestors of Queen Jeonghui

Yun An-suk (윤안숙)
Yun Cheok (윤척)
Yun Seung-rye (윤승례)
Yi Gwang-gi (이광기)
Lady, of the Jeonui Yi clan (전의 이씨)
Yun Beon, Internal Prince Papyeong (파평부원군 윤번)
Gwon Gyeom (권겸)
Gwon Hang (권항)
Lady, of the Jeonju Choe clan (전주 최씨)
Lady, of the Andong Gwon clan (안동 권씨)
Queen Jeonghui
Yi Yik-se (이익세)
Yi Sim (이심)
Yi Mun-hwa (이문화)
Gwon Yuk (권육)
Lady, of the Andong Gwon clan (안동 권씨)
Grand Internal Princess Consort Heungnyeong, of the Incheon Yi clan (흥녕부대부인 인천 이씨)
Choe Won-yu (최원유)
Choe Ryeom (최렴)
Lady, of the Seo clan (서씨)
Lady, of the Chungju Choe clan (충주 최씨)
Yi Rim (이림)
Lady, of the Goseong Yi clan (고성 이씨)
Lady, of the Namyang Hong clan (남양 홍씨)

== In popular culture ==
- Portrayed by Jung Hye-sun in the 1984–1985 MBC TV series 500 Years of Joseon: The Ume Tree in the Midst of the Snow.
- Portrayed by Choi Ran in the 1990 KBS2 TV series Dance Toward the Broken Heavens.
- Portrayed by Hong Se-mi in the 1994 KBS2 TV series Han Myung Hoe.
- Portrayed by Han Hye-sook in the 1998–2000 KBS1 TV series The King and the Queen.
- Portrayed by Yang Mi-kyung in the 2007–2008 SBS TV series The King and I.
- Portrayed by Kim Seo-ra in the 2011 KBS2 TV series The Princess' Man.
- Portrayed by Kim Mi-sook in the 2011–2012 JTBC TV series Insu, the Queen Mother.
- Inspired a fictional queen portrayed by Ryu Hwa-young in the 2018 TV Chosun TV series Grand Prince.
- Inspired a fictional queen dowager portrayed by Kim Ae-ran in the 2023 MBC TV series Joseon Attorney.

== See also ==
- Politics of Joseon
- Consort kin
- Styles and titles in Joseon

== Notes ==
Queen Jeonghui Papyeong Yun clan
Royal titles
Preceded by Queen Jeongsun of the Yeosan Song clan	Queen Consort of Joseon; 1455–1468	Succeeded by Queen Ansun of the Cheongju Han clan
Preceded by Queen Dowager Uideok of the Yeosan Song clan	Queen Dowager of Joseon; 1468–1469	Succeeded by Queen Dowager Inhye of the Cheongju Han clan
None	Grand Queen Dowager of Joseon; 1469–1483	Succeeded by Grand Queen Dowager Inhye of the Cheongju Han clan ------- Grand Queen Dowager Insu of the Cheongju Han clan
