= Queen Insu =

Queen of Joseon (1437–1504)

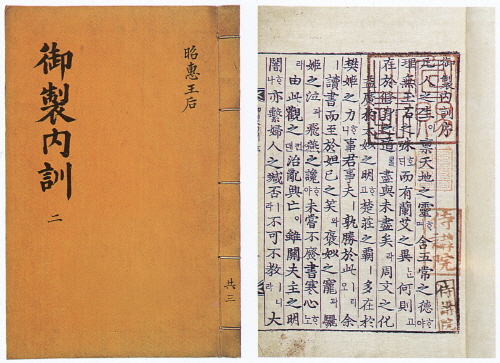
- Naehun (Instructions for Women), written by Queen Insu

Grand Queen Dowager of Joseon
- Tenure: 29 January 1495 – 21 May 1504
- Predecessor: Grand Queen Dowager Jaseong
- Successor: Grand Queen Dowager Seongryeol
- With: Grand Queen Dowager Inhye

Queen Dowager of Joseon
- Tenure: 11 April 1475 – 29 January 1495
- Predecessor: Queen Dowager Jaseong
- Successor: Queen Dowager Jasun
- With: Queen Dowager Inhye

Queen of Joseon (unspecified status)
- Tenure: 3 March 1470 – 11 April 1475

Crown Princess of Joseon
- Tenure: 16 September 1455 – 29 September 1457
- Predecessor: Crown Princess Gwon
- Successor: Crown Princess Han
- Born: 16 October 1437; Hanseong, Joseon
- Died: 21 May 1504 (aged 66); Gyeongchunjeon, Changgyeonggung, Hanseong, Joseon
- Burial: Gyeongneung, Seooreung Cluster, Goyang, South Korea
- Spouse: King Deokjong (m. 1450; died 1457)
- Issue Detail: 2 sons, 1 daughter
Regnal name
- Insu Jasuk (인수자숙; 仁粹慈淑) (Note: Known as honorific name (존호; 尊號) in the Sinosphere, its closest equivalent in the English-speaking world is the regnal name.)
Posthumous name
- Queen Hwisuk Myeongui Sohye (휘숙명의소혜왕후; 徽肅明懿昭惠王后)
- Clan: Cheongju Han (by birth); Jeonju Yi (by marriage)
- Dynasty: Yi
- Father: Han Hwak, Internal Prince Seowon
- Mother: Internal Princess Consort Namyang, of the Namyang Hong clan

Korean name
- Hangul: 인수왕후
- Hanja: 仁粹王后
- RR: Insu wanghu
- MR: Insu wanghu

Queen Sohye (Korean: 소혜왕후; Hanja: 昭惠王后; 16 October 1437 – 21 May 1504), of the Cheongju Han clan, commonly known as Queen Insu, was the wife of Crown Prince Uigyeong (King Deokjong). Though her husband never became king during his lifetime, she was nevertheless elevated to the position of queen following the accession to the throne of her second son, King Seongjong, in 1470. She was then styled as Queen Dowager Insu from 1475 until King Seongjong's death, and as Grand Queen Dowager Insu during the reign of her grandson, the tyrannical Yeonsangun.

Queen Insu holds a complex, formidable reputation in Korean history as a shrewd political operator and stern matriarch. While admired for her extraordinary intellect, literary legacy — having authored Naehun, which is widely regarded as the first book authored by a woman in Korea — and political capability, she is also remembered as an unyielding figure who was deeply intertwined with the brutal blood feuds that destabilized the early Joseon period.

== Biography ==
=== Early life and lineage ===
The future Queen Sohye was born during the reign of King Sejong, as the seventh child and youngest daughter among three sons and six daughters. Her father was Han Hwak, who would later become left state councilor, and her mother was a lady from the resurgent Namyang Hong clan. Born into a prestigious yangban family, she was exceptionally well-educated in the Chinese classics, Buddhist texts and Confucian philosophy, a rare distinction for a Korean woman of the 15th century.

Her natal Cheongju Han clan, an ancient lineage that rose from local gentry during the late Silla period to central government elites in Goryeo, had traditionally served as a primary breeding ground for high-ranking officials and royal consorts. Accordingly, Lady Han was a niece of Consort Kanghuizhuangshuli and Madame Gongshen (공신부인; consort of the Xuande Emperor), as well as a third cousin once removed of Queen Ansun, a fourth cousin once removed of Queen Jangsun, Queen Gonghye, and Sugui Shin, and a fourth cousin six times removed of Queen Inyeol.

=== Marriage ===
In 1450, at the age of 13, Lady Han married 12-year-old Yi Chang (이장), the elder son of Grand Prince Suyang (posthumously King Sejo) and his wife, Lady Yun (posthumously Queen Jeonghui).

After the Gyeyu Purge (계유정난) in 1453, Suyang was instated as chief state councilor and Han Hwak was granted the office of right state councilor. Han Myeong-hoe, the orchestrator of the coup, was Lady Han's distant relative. This formed the beginnings of Lady Han's network of political influence. In 1455, Suyang forced his young nephew, King Danjong, to abdicate in his favor. Yi Chang was thus invested as crown prince and Lady Han became crown princess.

In early 1455, she had given birth to her first child, Yi Jeong, followed by Commandery Princess Taean in 1456, and Yi Hyeol in 1457. Lady Han was meticulous from a young age and extremely devoted in serving her parents-in-law, so she was often praised by King Sejo as filial; however, she was a strict mother to her two sons, scolding them at the slightest mistake.

=== Widowhood ===
One month after the birth of their younger son, Yi Chang suddenly died; he received the posthumous name Uigyeong (의경). His brother, Grand Prince Haeyang (posthumously King Yejong), became the new crown prince, and Lady Han was titled Crown Princess Jeong (정빈), which was later changed to Crown Princess Su (수빈) in order to avoid confusion with one of Queen Wongyeong's previous titles. Feeling pity for his daughter-in-law, King Sejo specially allowed her to continue living in the royal palace, but Lady Han declined. A large and magnificent residence was built for her, which in time became the present Deoksugung.

Despite leaving the palace, Lady Han persisted in her diligent care for her parents-in-law, particularly strengthening her relationship with Queen Jeonghui, and remained highly favored by King Sejo for the remainder of his life. She married her second son to Han Myeong-hoe's legitimate youngest daughter, maintained close contact with powerful officials such as Shin Suk-ju, and helped her relatives and associates in their rise to high offices. Thanks to her efforts, when King Yejong died just 15 months after acceding to the throne, it was Lady Han's second son, Yi Hyeol, who was chosen to become the new king (posthumously King Seongjong), instead of Yejong's own son.

=== As queen dowager ===
At this time, Lady Han's status was unclear since her husband had never been king and her son had been adopted under King Yejong's name, meaning it was Queen Dowager Inhye who was recognized as King Seongjong's mother. In a first step, Crown Prince Uigyeong was posthumously named king and Lady Han received the ambiguous title "Queen Insu" (인수왕비). The next year, several of her close relatives were designated as meritorious subjects. Because there was a need to determine the hierarchy between Lady Han and Queen Dowager Inhye, Shin Suk-ju argued that they should heed the rules of private households, which followed sibling order, rather than the rules of the royal family, meaning Lady Han was the superior. Her mother-in-law, Grand Queen Dowager Jaseong (as Queen Jeonghui was known at the time), also issued an edict declaring that Lady Han had been entrusted by King Sejo with the task of protecting Yejong, implying her seniority above both the late Yejong and Queen Dowager Inhye; as such, Lady Han's superior standing was established. In 1475, her husband was elevated to great king and received a temple name, while Lady Han became queen dowager.

=== Later life and death ===
In any case, the regency was ultimately exerted by Grand Queen Dowager Jaseong and Lady Han's influence was constrained. It was only after Grand Queen Dowager Jaseong's death in 1483, when Lady Han became the most senior elder in the palace, that political power shifted fully into her hands. With the passing of King Seongjong and the accession of her grandson, Yi Yung (later known as Yeonsangun/Prince Yeonsan), she became grand queen dowager. However, once Yeonsangun discovered that his biological mother was the Deposed Queen Yun, brutal clashes ensued between them. Lady Han, who had already been critically ill for some months, died following an altercation with Yeonsangun due to his plan to confer a posthumous name upon Deposed Queen Yun.

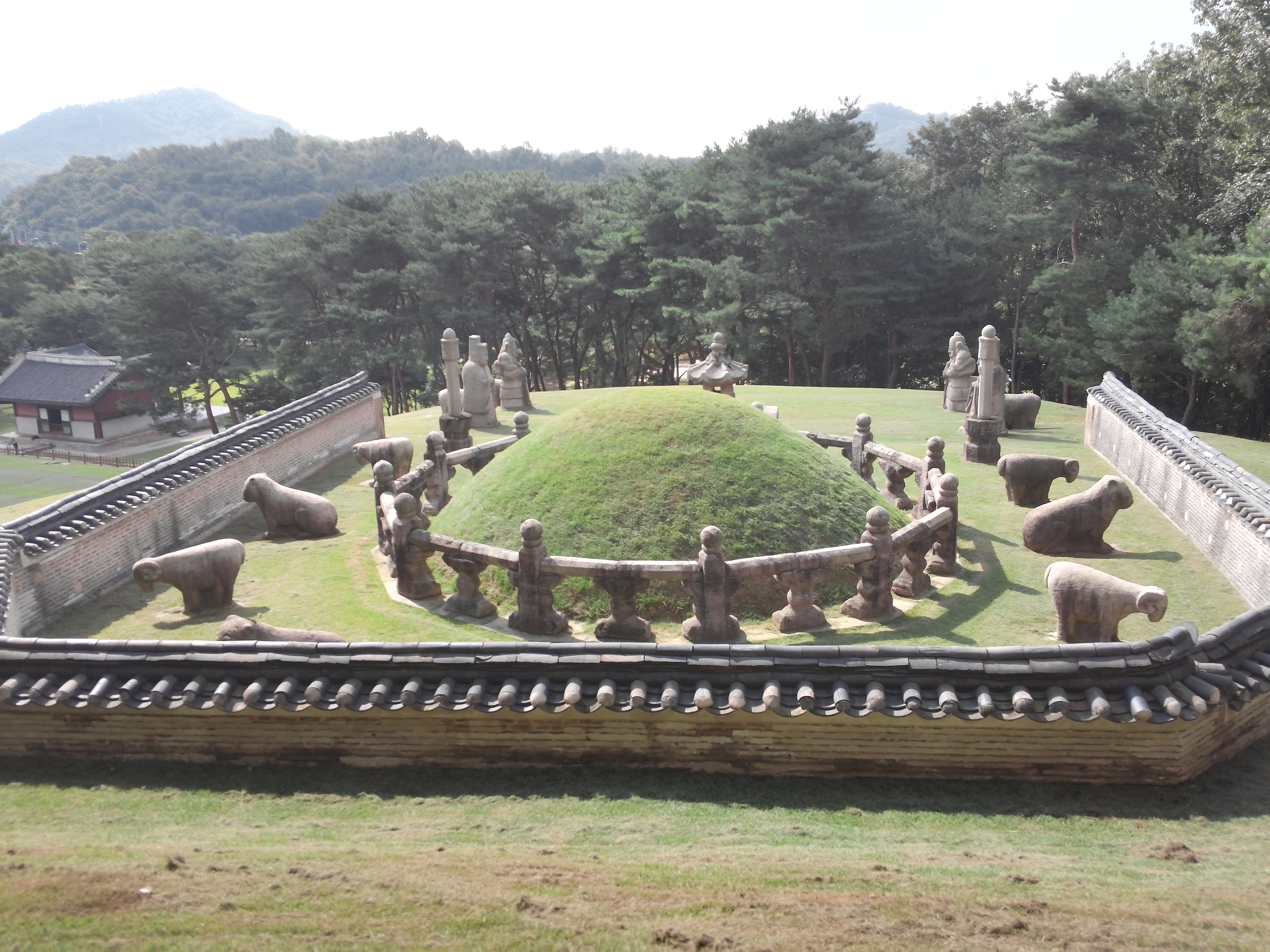
The tomb of Lady Han

She was five months away from her 67th birthday at the time of her death, having survived her husband by 46 years. She was buried alongside him within Gyeongneung (경릉), today part of the Seooreung Cluster in Goyang, Gyeonggi Province. Because his tomb was built according to the specifications for a crown prince, it is much simpler than that of Lady Han, who was grand queen dowager at the time of her death.

=== Legacy ===
Queen Insu published Naehun (Instructions for Women) in 1475. With the exception of a few apocryphal poems, this is the first known literary work authored by a Korean woman. The book appears as a Confucian morality guidebook for women, describing appropriate behavior in accordance with Confucian ideals, but can also be read as a manifesto portraying self-cultivation as the most appropriate behavior for a woman, endorsing the political activities of the author.

== Titles ==
- During the reign of King Sejong (r. 1418–1450):
  - Lady, of the Cheongju Han clan (청주 한씨; 淸州韓氏; from 16 October 1437)
    - Han Hwak's daughter (한확의 딸)
    - Lady Han (한씨; 韓氏)
- During the reign of King Munjong (r. 1450–1452):
  - Princess Consort (군부인; 郡夫人; from 1450)
- During the reign of King Sejo (r. 1455–1468):
  - Crown Princess (왕세제빈; 王世弟嬪; from 16 September 1455)
  - Crown Princess Jeong (정빈; 貞嬪; from 1457)
  - Crown Princess Su (수빈; 粹嬪; from 27 August 1465)
- During the reign of King Seongjong (r. 1470–1495):
  - Queen Insu (인수왕비; 仁粹王妃; from 3 March 1470)
  - Queen Dowager Insu (인수왕대비; 仁粹王大妃; from 11 April 1475)
- During the reign of Yeonsangun (r. 1495–1506):
  - Grand Queen Dowager Insu (인수대왕대비; 仁粹大王大妃; from 29 January 1495)
  - Queen Sohye (소혜왕후; 昭惠王后; from 1504)

== Family ==
- Father: Han Hwak (한확), Internal Prince Seowon (서원부원군; 1400 – 19 October 1456)
- Mother: Internal Princess Consort Namyang (남양부부인), of the Namyang Hong clan (남양 홍씨; 1404–1450)
- Sibling(s)
  - Han Chi-in (한치인), Prince Seoseong (서성군; 1421–1477) (Note: ▪︎Wife: Lady, of the Baecheon Jo clan (배천 조씨); daughter of Jo Seo-an (조서안). ▪︎Issue: 4 sons, 3 daughters.)
  - Lady, of the Cheongju Han clan (청주 한씨; 1423–?) (Note: Married Yi Gye-nyeong (이계녕) from the Seongju Yi clan (성주 이씨). They had no issue.)
  - Princess Consort Jeongseon (정선군부인), of the Cheongju Han clan (청주 한씨; 1426–1480) (Note: Married Yi Jeung (이증), Prince Gyeyang (계양군; 1427–1464); eighth son of King Sejong. They had issue (3 sons, 3 daughters).)
  - Lady, of the Cheongju Han clan (청주 한씨; 1427–?) (Note: Married Kim Ja-wan (김자완) from the (old) Andong Kim clan (구 안동 김씨).)
  - Lady, of the Cheongju Han clan (청주 한씨; 1431–?) (Note: Married Choe Jeong (최정) from the Jeonju Choe clan (전주 최씨).)
  - Lady, of the Cheongju Han clan (청주 한씨; 1434–1481) (Note: Married Gwon Jip (권집) from the Andong Gwon clan (안동 권씨); first cousin once removed of Concubine Gong and great-grandson of King Taejong. [Lineage: King Taejong → Princess Gyeongan (경안공주; 1393–1415) → Gwon Chong (권총; 1413–1480) → Gwon Jip])
  - Han Chi-ui (한치의), Prince Cheongyang (청양군; 1440–1473) (Note: ▪︎Wife: Lady, of the Jeonui Yi clan (전의 이씨); daughter of Yi Hang-jeon (이항전). ▪︎Issue: 2 sons, 1 daughter.)
  - Han Chi-rye (한치례), Prince Seoreung (서릉군; 1441–1499) (Note: ▪︎Wife: Lady, of the Juksan An clan (죽산 안씨; 1448–1492); second daughter of Princess Jeongui (정의공주; 1415–1477) and granddaughter of King Sejong. ▪︎Issue: 1 son, 2 daughters.)
- Husband: King Deokjong (덕종대왕; 12 October 1438 – 29 September 1457)
  - Father-in-law: King Sejo (세조대왕; 11 November 1417 – 2 October 1468)
  - Mother-in-law: Queen Jeonghui (정희왕후), of the Papyeong Yun clan (파평 윤씨; 25 December 1418 – 15 May 1483)
- Issue
  - Yi Jeong (이정), Grand Prince Wolsan (월산대군; 14 January 1455 – 31 January 1489)
  - Princess Myeongsuk (명숙공주; 1456 – 23 November 1482); given name Gyeong-geun (경근)
  - Yi Hyeol (이혈), King Seongjong (성종대왕; 28 August 1457 – 29 January 1495)

== Ancestry ==
Ancestors of Queen Insu

Han Bang-sin (한방신)
Han Yeong (한영)
Han Yeong-jeong (한영정)
Gwon Jung-hwa (권중화)
Lady, of the Andong Gwon clan (안동 권씨)
Han Hwak, Internal Prince Seowon (서원부원군 한확)
Kim Yeong-ryeol (김영렬)
Lady, of the Uiseong Kim clan (의성 김씨)
Queen Sohye
Hong Bo-hyeon (홍보현)
Hong Gil-min (홍길민)
Hong Yeo-bang (홍여방)
Gyeong Jin (경진)
Lady, of the Cheongju Gyeong clan (청주 경씨)
Internal Princess Consort Namyang, of the Namyang Hong clan (남양부부인 남양 홍씨)
Jeong Bu (정부)
Lady, of the Dongnae Jeong clan (동래 정씨)

== In popular culture ==
- Portrayed by Jeon Ok in the 1962 film Prince Yeonsan.
- Portrayed by Jeon Ok in the 1962 film Tyrant Yeonsan.
- Portrayed by Hwang Jeong-sun in the 1972 TBC TV series Song of Longing for My Mother.
- Portrayed by Go Doo-shim in the 1984–1985 MBC TV series 500 Years of Joseon: The Ume Tree in the Midst of the Snow.
- Portrayed by Jung Hye-sun in the 1987 film Prince Yeonsan.
- Portrayed by Han Eun-jin in the 1988 film Diary of King Yeonsan.
- Portrayed by Kim Young-ran in the 1994 KBS2 TV series Han Myung Hoe.
- Portrayed by Ban Hyo-jung in the 1995 KBS2 TV series Jang Nok Soo.
- Portrayed by Chae Shi-ra in 1998–2000 KBS1 TV series The King and the Queen.
- Portrayed by Yun So-jeong in the 2005 film The King and the Clown.
- Portrayed by Jeon In-hwa in the 2007–2008 SBS TV series The King and I.
- Portrayed by Hahm Eun-jung and Chae Shi-ra in the 2011–2012 JTBC TV series Insu, the Queen Mother.
- Portrayed by Moon Sook in the 2017 MBC TV series The Rebel.
- Portrayed by Jang Yeong-nam in the 2017 film The King's Case Note.
- Inspired a fictional queen dowager portrayed by Seo Yi-sook in the 2025 tvN TV series Bon Appétit, Your Majesty.

== See also ==
- History of Korea
- Consort kin
- Styles and titles in Joseon
- Political factions of Joseon

== Notes ==
Queen Insu Cheongju Han clan
Royal titles
Preceded by Queen Dowager Jaseong of the Cheongju Han clan	Queen Dowager of Joseon; 1475–1495 with Queen Dowager Inhye	Succeeded by Queen Dowager Jasun of the Papyeong Yun clan
Preceded by Grand Queen Dowager Jaseong of the Papyeong Yun clan	Grand Queen Dowager of Joseon; 1495–1504 with Grand Queen Dowager Inhye until 1499	Succeeded by Grand Queen Dowager Seongryeol of the Papyeong Yun clan
