= Consort Han (Yongle) =

Consort Kanghuizhuangshuli 康惠莊淑麗妃
- Consort Li (麗妃)
- Born: 1399; Kingdom of Joseon
- Died: 12 August 1424; Yongle 22, 18th day of the 7th month (永樂二十二年七月十八日) (aged 25); Beijing
- Burial: Changling Mausoleum
- Spouse: Yongle Emperor
Posthumous name
- Kanghuizhuangshu (康惠莊淑)
- Clan: Cheongju Han
- Father: Han Yeong-jeong
- Mother: Lady Kim of the Uiseong Kim clan

Consort Kanghuizhuangshuli (康惠莊淑麗妃; 1399 – 1424), of the Korean Cheongju Han clan, was a consort of the Yongle Emperor.

== Biography ==
Joseon sent a total of 114 women as tribute to the Ming dynasty, consisting of 16 virgin girls including Lady Han who was chosen as an imperial concubine of the Yongle Emperor because of her outstanding beauty.

In 1421, she was implicated in the alleged plot which resulted in the mass execution in the emperor's harem, where many of the emperor's concubines, their maids and eunuchs were executed, accused of having participated in a murder plot against the emperor.

She managed to avoid being executed but was imprisoned. When the emperor died in 1424, she belonged to the 30 people executed in order to join the emperor by being buried with him.

After the Hongxi Emperor ascended, Consort Li knelt down and begged the new emperor to let her return to Joseon to support her elderly mother but the Hongxi Emperor didn't allow her and ordered to have Consort Li hanged and buried with the late emperor. Consort Li was posthumously granted the title of Consort Kanghuizhuangshuli.

== Family ==
Consort Li was born in the Cheongju Han clan, one of the most proeminent Korean clans who produced 6 Queens during the Joseon Dynasty.

- Father: Han Yeong-jeong (한영정, 韓永矴; 1375–?)
- Mother: Lady Kim of the Uiseong Kim clan (정경부인 의성 김씨; 1375 - 13 March 1423)
- Three younger brothers:
  - First younger brother: Han Hwak (한확, 韓確; 1400 – 1456) served as Left State Councillor and Right State Councillor during the Joseon dynasty.
    - Niece: Han Yu-san (한유산,韓柚山), Princess Consort Jeongseon (정선군부인 한씨; 12 April 1426 – 27 July 1480), daughter-in-law of Sejong the Great
    - Niece: Han Do-san (한도산; 韓桃山), Queen Sohye of the Cheongju Han clan(소혜왕후 한씨; 7 October 1437 – 11 May 1504), mother of King Seongjong
- Younger sister: Han Gye-ran (한계란, 韓桂蘭) (1410 - 1483), Consort Gongshen; consort of the Xuande Emperor

== Titles ==
- During the reign of the Hongwu Emperor (r. 1368–1398):
  - Lady Han, of the Cheongju Han clan (清州韓氏)
- During the reign of the Yongle Emperor (r. 1402– 1424):
  - Consort Li (麗妃)
  - Consort Kanghuizhuangshuli (康惠莊淑麗妃)
