= Consort Gong =

Consort Gong may refer to:

- Empress Dowager Gong (died 562), Xiao Tong's concubine and Xiao Cha's mother
- Queen Soheon (1395–1446), wife of Sejong the Great
- Royal Consort Gongbin Choe (fl. 1462), concubine of the future Yejong of Joseon
- Royal Noble Consort Gongbin Kim (1553–1577), consort of Seonjo of Joseon
- Empress Dowager Wang (Taichang) (1565–1611), concubine of the Wanli Emperor

== See also ==
- Empress Gong (died 452), consort of Tuoba Huang
