= Prince Kyeyang =

Korean prince (1427–1464)

Yi Chŭng 이증
- Prince Kyeyang (계양군)
- Born: 12 August 1427; Joseon
- Died: 16 August 1464 (age 37); Joseon
- Burial: Ilpae-dong, Namyangju, Gyeonggi Province
- Consort: Princess Consort Jeongseon
- Issue: 4 sons and 3 daughters
- Clan: Jeonju Yi clan
- Dynasty: House of Yi
- Father: Sejong of Joseon
- Mother: Royal Noble Consort Sin of the Cheongju Kim clan
- Religion: Neo-Confucianism

Yi Chŭng (Korean: 이증; 12 August 1427 – 16 August 1464), formally known as Prince Kyeyang (계양군), was the eighth son of Sejong the Great born by Royal Noble Consort Sin. Among his father's sons, he was the most favoured, along with his young half-brother, Grand Prince Yŏngŭng.

== Biography ==
Yi Chŭng was born on 16 August 1427 as the son of King Sejong and Lady Kim, who was at that time a court lady.

In January 1434 (the 16th year of King Sejong), he was granted the title of Prince Kyeyang.

He helped his older half-brother, Grand Prince Suyang, and participated in a coup d'état against his nephew, King Danjong. After Sejo's accession to the throne, he was given the rank of Jwaik Gongsin (좌익공신). Right after Sejo's accession to the throne, he gained his trust and was favored by his brother. Since then, he has participated in various royal events.

His wife is Lady Han, the daughter of Han Hwak, the Councillor of Joseon, and the older sister of Queen Sohye, who was King Sejo's daughter-in-law and King Uigyeong's wife.

== Family ==
Parents

- Father: King Sejong of Joseon (조선 세종; 15 May 1397 – 8 April 1450)
- Mother: Royal Noble Consort Sin of the Cheongju Kim clan (신빈 김씨; 1406 – 4 September 1464)

Consorts and issue(s):

- Wife: Han Yusan (한유산; 韓柚山), Princess Consort Jeongseon of the Cheongju Han clan (정선군부인 한씨; 12 April 1426 – 27 April 1480); Han Hwak's second daughter
  - Princess Yi of the Jeonju Yi clan (향주 전주 이씨; 1441–?), 1st daughter
  - Yi Ye, Prince Yeongwon (영원군 예; 1450 – 16 June 1513), 1st son
  - Yi Suk, Prince Kangyang (강양군 숙; 1453–1499), 2nd son
  - Princess Yi of the Jeonju Yi clan (향주 전주 이씨; 1454–?), 2nd daughter
  - Princess Yi of the Jeonju Yi clan (향주 전주 이씨; 1456–?), 3rd daughter
  - Yi Sik, Prince Burim (부림군 식; 1458–1489), 3rd son
- Unnamed Concubine
  - Yi Nan (방산수 이난; 1460–?), 4th son
