= Princess Myeongsuk =

Princess of Joseon (1456–1482)

Princess Myeongsuk 명숙공주
- Princess of Joseon
- Born: Yi Gyeong-geun; 1456; Joseon
- Died: 1482 (aged 25–26); Joseon
- Burial: Princess Myeongsuk's Mausoleum, 86–9, Yongdu-dong, Deokyang-gu, Goyang, Gyeonggi Province
- Spouse: Hong Sang, Prince Consort Dangyang (m. 1466–1482)
- Issue: Hong Baek-gyeong
Names
- Princess Myeongui (Korean: 명의공주; Hanja: 明懿公主); Commandery Princess Taean (Korean: 태안군주; Hanja: 泰安郡主)
- House: Jeonju Yi (by birth); Namyang Hong (by marriage)
- Father: Deokjong of Joseon
- Mother: Queen Sohye of the Cheongju Han clan

Princess Myeongsuk (Korean: 명숙공주; Hanja: 明淑公主; 1456–1482), or Princess Myeongui (명의공주; 明懿公主), previously known as Commandery Princess Taean (태안군주; 泰安郡主), was a Joseon princess as the only daughter of King Deokjong and Queen Insu.

== Biography ==
=== Early life ===
The princess was born on 1456 and was named Yi Gyeong-geun (Korean: 이경근; Hanja: 李慶根). She was the older sister of the future Seongjong of Joseon and the younger sister of Grand Prince Wolsan.

After her father's death in 1457, the 3rd year of King Sejo's reign, the Princess, along with her mother and brothers lived outside the palace.

=== Marriage and later life ===
On 19 December 1466, she married Hong Sang (홍상) of the Namyang Hong clan who was honoured as Prince Consort Dangyang (당양군).

In 1470, after her younger brother, Grand Prince Jalsan, ascended the throne, her father was posthumously elevated to King Deokjong (덕종왕; 德宗王) and her mother was honoured as Queen Insu (인수왕비; 仁粹王妃), and later promoted to Queen Dowager (대비; 大妃).

The new King also honoured his older sister as Princess Myeongsuk, formally called Princess Myeongui. She gave birth to a son, Hong Baek-gyeong, in 1481.

The princess later died on October 4, 1482, in the 13th year of the reign of her brother, Seongjong of Joseon, and it was reported that he was very sad about her death.

Her son. Hong Baek-gyeong, later married a woman from the Seongju Yi clan, and had a daughter and son.

The princess' granddaughter later married the future Queen Dangyeong's older brother, Shin Hong-pil. Shin also happened to be the Deposed Queen Shin's nephew, and intermarried into the Cheongju Han clan as Queen Dangyeong's and Shin Hong-pil's mother was a first cousin thrice removed to Princess Myeongsuk through Queen Insu.

== Family ==
- Mother - Han Do-san, Queen Sohye of the Cheongju Han clan (7 October 1437 – 11 May 1504)
- Father - Yi Jang, Deokjong of Joseon (3 October 1438 – 20 September 1457)
- Siblings
  - Older brother - Yi Jeong, Grand Prince Wolsan (1454–1488)
  - Younger brother - Yi Hyeol, Seongjong of Joseon (19 August 1457 – 19 January 1495)
- Husband - Hong Sang, Lord Danyang (당양위 홍상; 1455–1513)
- Issue
  - Son - Hong Baek-gyeong (홍백경; 洪伯慶; 1481–?)
