= The King and the Queen =

1998–2000 South Korean television series

- Also known as: King and Queen
- Hangul: 왕과 비
- Hanja: 王과 妃
- RR: Wanggwa bi
- MR: Wanggwa pi
- Genre: Historical; Political thriller
- Created by: KBS Drama Production (드라마 제작국)
- Written by: Jung Ha-yeon
- Directed by: Kim Jong-sun; Kim Yong-sun → Yoon Yong-hoon; Yoon Chang-bum
- Starring: See below
- Narrated by: Lee Kang-sik
- Theme music composer: Im Taek-soo
- Opening theme: "Tears Of The Dragon" by Im Taek-soo
- Composer: Im Taek-soo
- Country of origin: South Korea
- Original language: Korean
- No. of episodes: 186

Production
- Executive producer: Yoon Heung-sik
- Producer: Yoon Yong-hoon
- Cinematography: Choi Yong-kyun
- Editor: Min Byung-ho
- Camera setup: Song Jae-gi
- Running time: 45–65 minutes

Original release
- Network: KBS1
- Release: June 6, 1998 – March 26, 2000

Related
- Insu, the Queen Mother

The King and the Queen (Korean: 왕과 비; RR: Wanggwa bi) is a South Korean television series starring Im Dong-jin and Chae Shi-ra, along with Han Hye-sook, Lee Jin-woo and Ahn Jae-mo. It aired on KBS1 from June 6, 1998, to March 26, 2000, on Saturdays and Sundays at 21:45 (KST) for 186 episodes. The series begins with the death of King Munjong and ends with the Jungjong coup.

== Cast ==
=== Main ===
- Im Dong-jin as Grand Prince Suyang, later King Sejo
- Chae Shi-ra as Queen Sohye, later Dowager Queen Insoo
- Han Hye-sook as Queen Junghee, later Grand Royal Dowager Queen Jaseong
- Lee Jin-woo as King Seongjong
  - Kim Min-woo as young King Seongjong
- Ahn Jae-mo as Prince Yeonsan, later King Yeonsan
  - Kim Hak-joon as young Prince Yeonsan

=== Supporting ===
==== Kings and Queens ====
- Jung Tae-woo as King Danjong
- Lee Gwang-ki as Crown Prince Uigyeong, later King Deokjong, Queen Sohye's husband.
- Lee Yung-ho as King Yejong
- Choi Woo-hyuk as King Jungjong
- Kim Min-jung as Queen Jungsoon, Danjong's wife.
- Kim Sung-ryung as Deposed Queen Yoon, Seongjong's second wife.
- Yoon Ji-sook as Queen Junghyun, later Dowager Queen Jasoon; Seongjong's third wife and Jungjong's mother.
- Kyeong In-sun as Queen Ansoon, Yejong's second wife.
  - Shin Ji-ae as young Queen Ansoon
- Shin Ji-soo as Queen Gonghye, Seongjong's first wife.
- Lee Si-nae as Deposed Queen Shin, Yeonsan's wife.

==== Princes and Princesses ====
- Kim Jung-eun as Princess Gyeonghye, Munjong's oldest daughter.
- Shin Goo as Grand Prince Yangnyung, Taejong's oldest son.
- Kim In-tae as Grand Prince Hyoryung, Taejong's second son.
- Jung Sung-mo as Grand Prince Anpyung, Sejong's third son.
- Jeon Byung-wook as Grand Prince Imyung, Sejong's fourth son.
- Lee Jae-shik as Prince Gwisung, Grand Prince Imyung's second son.
- Won Suk-yun as Grand Prince Geumsung, Sejong's sixth son.
- Kim Sung-soo as Grand Prince Yungeung, Sejong's 15th son.
- Lee Sung-yong as Prince Gyeyang, Sejong's eighth son.
- Kim Kyung-eung as Prince Yungpung, Sejong's 16th son.
- Song Ho-seop as Grand Prince Wolsan, Deokjong's oldest son.
  - Lee-in as young Grand Prince Wolsan
- Park Chan-hwan as Grand Prince Jeahn, Yejong's oldest son.

== Production ==
The initial title was Life of the Wind (바람의 생애), but was later changed into The King and the Queen (왕과 비) to reflect the conflict between the main historical figures of the series – King Sejo, Queen Junghee and Queen Insoo, and later Yeonsangun and his mother. As a follow-up to Tears of the Dragon (용의 눈물), the theme song was the same.

It was originally scheduled to end by December 1999 to make way for the follow-up drama Taejo Wang Geon; however, as Taejo Wang Geon was postponed to March 2000 due to the withdrawal of director Kim Jae-hyung after bribery allegations, The King and the Queen was extended to cover not only Queen Insoo's successful seizure of power, but also Yeonsangun, the second literati purge of 1504 and Queen Insoo's death. The directing team also changed to Yoon Yong-hoon and Yoon Chang-beom as PD Kim Jong-sun, who had been co-directing, left to direct Taejo Wang Geon.

== Reception ==
The King and the Queen was criticized for glorifying Sejo's usurpation of power and giving it historical legitimacy, as well as depicting immorality excessively. Chae Shi-ra's acting as Queen Insoo was deemed "flat" and "pitiful to watch". Towards the end of the series, reporter Kang Chan-ho wrote "The King and the Queen is not highlighting great figures, but rather relegating almost all of its characters to the status of vengeance incarnations or animals struggling for survival."

For The Dong-A Ilbo, the series was unable to receive the support typical of historical dramas due to the IMF crisis that hit the broadcasting industry at the time; however, its ratings began to rise rapidly after King Sejo's death and the more prominent role taken by Queen Insoo, although it received criticism for becoming a palace struggle among women. Nonetheless, ratings rose over 35%.

== Awards and nominations ==
Year	Award	Category	Recipient	Result
1998	KBS Drama Awards	Top Excellence Award, Actor	Im Dong-jin	Won
1998	KBS Drama Awards	Excellence Award, Actor	Jo Kyung-hwan	Nominated
1998	KBS Drama Awards	Excellence Award, Actress	Kim Hye-ri	Nominated
1998	KBS Drama Awards	Best Young Actor	Jung Tae-woo	Won
1998	KBS Drama Awards	Best Young Actress	Kim Min-jung	Won
1999	KBS Drama Awards	Grand Prize (Daesang)	Chae Shi-ra	Won
1999	KBS Drama Awards	Excellence Award, Actress	Kim Sung-ryung	Won
1999	KBS Drama Awards	Best Supporting Actor	Choi Jong-won	Won
1999	KBS Drama Awards	Best Writer	Jung Ha-yeon	Won
