= Prince Yeongsan =

Korean prince (1490–1538)

Yi Jeon 李恮 이전
- Prince Yeongsan (영산군 or 녕산군)
- Born: 22 September 1490; Kingdom of Joseon
- Died: 11 June 1538 (aged 47); Kingdom of Joseon
- Burial: Eunpyeong District, Seoul, South Korea
- Consort: Princess Consort Geumneung of the Cheongsong Sim clan, Princess Consort Gyoseong of the Gyeongju Jeong clan
- Issue: 4 sons and 5 daughters
Posthumous name
- 영산군 이전
- House: Jeonju Yi
- Father: Seongjong of Joseon
- Mother: Royal Consort Sugyong of the Cheongsong Sim clan (숙용 심씨)

- Prince Yeongsan
- Hangul: 이전
- Hanja: 李恮
- RR: I Jeon
- MR: I Chŏn

Royal title
- Hangul: 영산군
- Hanja: 寧山君
- RR: Yeongsangun
- MR: Yŏngsan'gun

Yi Jeon, Prince Yeongsan (Korean: 영산군 이전; Hanja: 寧山君 李恮; 22 September 1490 – 11 June 1538 (Note: In the lunar calendar)) was a prince of the Joseon Dynasty. He was the youngest son of King Seongjong of Joseon and Royal Consort Suk-yong, Lady Sim.

== Life ==
Yi Jeon was born on 22 September 1490, 21st year of King Seongjong of Joseon, as the second son of King Seongjong and Royal Consort Suk-yong of the Cheongsong Sim clan. He had 2 full older sisters and 1 full older brother.

Yi Jeon did archery, horseback riding, and loved hunting.

In the 3rd year of King Jungjong (1508), Sin Bok-ui and Dong Cheong-rye were conspired to treason and allegedly Yi Jeon was involved, but the prince denied this.

In the year 1513 (the 8th year of King Jungjong), when Park Yeong-mu and Sin Yun-mu, who conspired against treason, Yi Jeon was again mentioned. Accordingly, Prince Yeongsan asked to be punished but King Jungjong did not. The ministers requested that Prince Yeongsan, who was involved in the treason, be sent abroad but Jungjong did not accept.

In 1519 (14th year of King Jungjong), he and his half-brother Yi Don caused a scandal for immoral behavior. Park Soo-moon asked Jungjong to control the actions of the princes.

In 1521 (16th year of King Jungjong), Prince Yeongsan was mentioned along with Yi Don in the rebellion of Prince Gyeongmyeong (1489–1526). The ministers asked King Jungjong to punish the princes, but the King protected them.

He died on June 11, 1538 (33rd year of King Jungjong). He was buried in Seoul.

== Family ==
- Father: King Seongjong of Joseon
- Mother: Royal Consort Sugyong of the Cheongsong Sim clan (숙용 심씨; 1465–1515)
  - Older sister: Princess Gyeongsun (경순옹주; 1482–?)
  - Older sister: Princess Sukhye (숙혜옹주; 1486-1525)
  - Older brother: Yi Gwan, Prince Yiseong (이관 이성군; 1489–1552)
- Consorts and issues:
  - Princess Consort Geumneung of the Cheongsong Sim clan (금릉군부인 청송 심씨, 金陵郡夫人 靑松沈氏; 1480–4 May 1524) (Note: Was the great-great-granddaughter of Sim On through his second son, Sim Hoe)
    - Daughter: Yi Ui-jeong (증 정부인 이의정, 李懿貞; 1508–?)
    - Daughter: Yi Gyeong-jeong (이경정, 李敬貞; 1512–?)
  - Princess Consort Gyoseong of the Gyeongju Jeong clan (교성군부인 경주 정씨, 交城郡夫人 慶州鄭氏; 1490–8 May ?)
  - Princess Consort Hamheung of the Hamheung Hwang clan (함흥군부인 함흥 황씨; 1495–?)
    - Son: Yi Jeong, Prince Euncheon (은천군 정; 1514–?)
    - Son: Yi Sang, Prince Jangheung (장흥군 상; 12 October 1520 – 8 June 1572)
    - Son: Yi Yu, Prince Eumseong (음성도정 유; 13 April 1522 – 14 January 1588)
    - Son: Yi Rok, Prince Yangsan (양산군; 3 July 1533 - 12 May 1573)
  - Concubine: Eo Yeo-bun (어여분, 於汝分)
  - Concubine: Unknown
  - Concubine: Unknown
    - 3 daughters
  - Concubine : Unknown
    - Son: Yi Mak-ji (이막지; 1518–?)
