= Gongbin Choe =

Korean royal consort (fl. 15th century)

- Royal Consort of the Senior First Rank
- Born: after 1441; Joseon
- Died: after 1483; Joseon
- Burial: Goyang, South Korea
- Consort of: King Yejong
- Clan: Jeonju Choe (by birth); Jeonju Yi (by marriage)
- Dynasty: Yi
- Father: Choe Do-il
- Mother: Lady, of the Gyeongju Jeong clan

Korean name
- Hangul: 공빈 최씨
- Hanja: 恭嬪 崔氏
- RR: Gongbin Choessi
- MR: Kongbin Ch'oessi

Gongbin Choe (Korean: 공빈 최씨; Hanja: 恭嬪 崔氏; birth and death dates unknown), or Concubine Gong, (Note: The literal translation of bin (빈; 嬪) is "concubine". Combined with the honorific title gong (공; 恭), the full meaning is "Courteous Concubine".) of the Jeonju Choe clan, was a consort of King Yejong, the eighth monarch of Joseon.

== Biography ==
=== Early life and lineage ===
Lady Choe was most likely born during the reign of King Sejong, as the younger daughter among one son and two daughters. The exact date and year of birth are unknown. Her father was Choe Do-il (최도일) and her mother was a lady from the Gyeongju Jeong clan (경주 정씨).

Her natal Jeonju Choe clan had a history of forming marital relationships with the royal family. Her grandfather's sisters, Princess Consort Jeonju (전주군부인 ) and Grand Princess Consort Wansan (완산부부인), were the wives of King Taejong's fifth son, Prince Hamnyeong (함녕군), and King Sejong's seventh son, Grand Prince Geumseong (금성대군), respectively. Her father's sister was the second wife of Grand Prince Imyong, Grand Princess Consort Jean (제안부부인), and through this connection, Lady Choe was a first cousin of Prince Gwiseong (귀성군), who served as chief state councilor during the last year of King Sejo's reign, as well as of County Princess Jungmo (중모현주), the mother of Deposed Queen Shin.

=== As royal consort ===
In 1462, Lady Choe was selected as a consort for King Yejong (then known as Crown Prince Hwang) and appointed as a consort of the crown prince of the junior fifth rank (소훈; sohun). Following Yejong's accession to the throne, she became a royal consort of the junior second rank (숙의; sugui). In 1483, during King Seongjong's reign, she was elevated to the junior first rank (귀인; gwiin). She appears as "Concubine Gong" in the genealogy of the Jeonju Choe clan, but there are no surviving records about her promotion to the senior first rank (빈; bin).

=== Death ===
It is unknown when Lady Choe died. She was buried near the tomb of Princess Gyeonghye, in present-day Goyang, Gyeonggi Province.

== Titles ==
- During the reign of King Sejong (r. 1418–1450):
  - Lady, of the Jeonju Choe clan (전주 최씨; 全州崔氏; from unknown date)
    - Choe Do-il's daughter (최도일의 딸)
    - Lady Choe (최씨; 崔氏)
- During the reign of King Sejo (r. 1455–1468):
  - Sohun (Note: lit. ''Lady of Clear Instruction'') (소훈; 昭訓; from 1462), consort of the crown prince of the junior fifth rank
- During the reign of King Yejong (r. 1468–1470):
  - Sugui (Note: lit. ''Lady of Warm Deportment'') (숙의; 淑儀; from unknown date), royal consort of the junior second rank
- During the reign of King Seongjong (r. 1470–1495):
  - Gwiin (Note: lit. ''Noble Lady'') (귀인; 貴人; from 1483), royal consort of the junior first rank
  - Concubine Gong (공빈; 恭嬪; from unknown date), royal consort of the senior first rank

== Family ==
- Father: Choe Do-il (최도일; ?–1461)
- Mother: Lady, of the Gyeongju Jeong clan (경주 정씨)
- Sibling(s)
  - Choe Se-hyeon (최세현; 1439–1502) (Note: ▪︎Wife: Lady, of the Gwangsan Kim clan (광산 김씨); eldest daughter of Kim Gyeom-gwang (김겸광). ▪︎Issue: 1 son, 3 daughters.)
  - Princess Consort Gimje (김제군부인), of the Jeonju Choe clan (전주 최씨; 1441–1493) (Note: Married Yi Bu (이부), Prince Yeongsun (영순군; 1444–1470); son of Grand Prince Gwangpyeong (광평대군; 1425–1445) and grandson of King Sejong. They had issue (3 sons).)
- Consort of: King Yejong (예종대왕; 23 January 1450 – 9 January 1470) — No issue.

== Ancestry ==
Choe Yu-gyeong (최유경)
Choe Sa-gang (최사강)
Choe Seung-nyeong (최승녕)
Choe Do-il (최도일)
Concubine Gong
Jeong Hui-gye (정희계)
Lady, of the Gyeongju Jeong clan (경주 정씨)

== See also ==
- Styles and titles in Joseon
- History of Korea
