= Crown Prince Ŭigyŏng =

Crown Prince of Joseon (1438–1457)

- King of Joseon (posthumously)

Crown Prince of Joseon
- Tenure: 16 September 1455 – 29 September 1457
- Investiture: Geunjeongjeon, Gyeongbokgung
- Predecessor: Crown Prince Hong-wi
- Successor: Crown Prince Hwang
- Born: 12 October 1438; Gyeongbokgung, Hanseong, Joseon
- Died: 29 September 1457 (aged 18); Jaseondang, Gyeongbokgung, Hanseong, Joseon
- Burial: Gyeongneung, Seooreung Cluster, Goyang, South Korea
- Spouse: Queen Sohye (m. 1450)
- Issue Detail: Grand Prince Wolsan; Princess Myeongsuk; Seongjong of Joseon
Names
- Yi Chang (이장; 李暲)
Posthumous name
- Crown Prince Uigyong (의경세자; 懿敬世子) → King Uigyong (의경왕; 懿敬王) → Great King Seonsuk Gonghyeon Onmun Uigyong (선숙공현온문의경대왕; 宣肅恭顯溫文懿敬大王)
Temple name
- Deokjong (덕종; 德宗)
- Clan: Jeonju Yi
- Dynasty: Yi
- Father: King Sejo
- Mother: Queen Jeonghui
- Religion: Confucianism (Neo-Confucianism)

Korean name
- Hangul: 의경세자
- Hanja: 懿敬世子
- RR: Uigyeong seja
- MR: Ŭigyŏng seja

Royal title
- Hangul: 도원군
- Hanja: 桃源君
- RR: Dowongun
- MR: Towŏn'gun

Courtesy name
- Hangul: 원명
- Hanja: 原明
- RR: Wonmyeong
- MR: Wŏnmyŏng

Childhood name
- Hangul: 현동
- Hanja: 賢同
- RR: Hyeondong
- MR: Hyŏndong

Crown Prince Ŭigyŏng (Korean: 의경세자; Hanja: 懿敬世子; 12 October 1438 – 29 September 1457), (Note: In the Korean calendar (lunisolar), he was born on the 15th day of the 9th lunar month and died on the 2nd day of the 9th lunar month.) personal name Yi Chang, also known by his temple name King Deokjong, was the eldest son of King Sejo, the seventh monarch of Joseon, and the biological father of King Seongjong.

== Biography ==
Yi Chang was born during the reign of his grandfather, Sejong the Great, as the eldest child of the future King Sejo and his wife, Queen Jeonghui. He was enfeoffed as Prince Dowon (도원군) in 1445 and held the title until his father's accession to the throne. In 1450, he married Lady Han (posthumously Queen Sohye, better known as Queen Insu), the daughter of Han Hwak.

Yi Chang and Lady Han's first child, Grand Prince Wolsan, was born on 14 January 1455; their daughter, Princess Myeongsuk, in 1456; and their last child, the future King Seongjong, on 28 August 1457.

A month later, on 29 September 1457, Yi Chang died of unknown causes.

After his death, Lady Han and his children were allowed to continue living within the palace, but the former crown princess did not want to impose her stay and moved to a private residence.

Yi Chang's younger brother, Grand Prince Haeyang, became the new crown prince and acceded to the throne in 1468 (posthumously King Yejong). When he suddenly passed away 15 months later, Yejong was succeeded by Yi Chang's younger son. That same year, Yi Chang was posthumously elevated to the status of king, and in 1475, he was raised to great king and received a temple name.

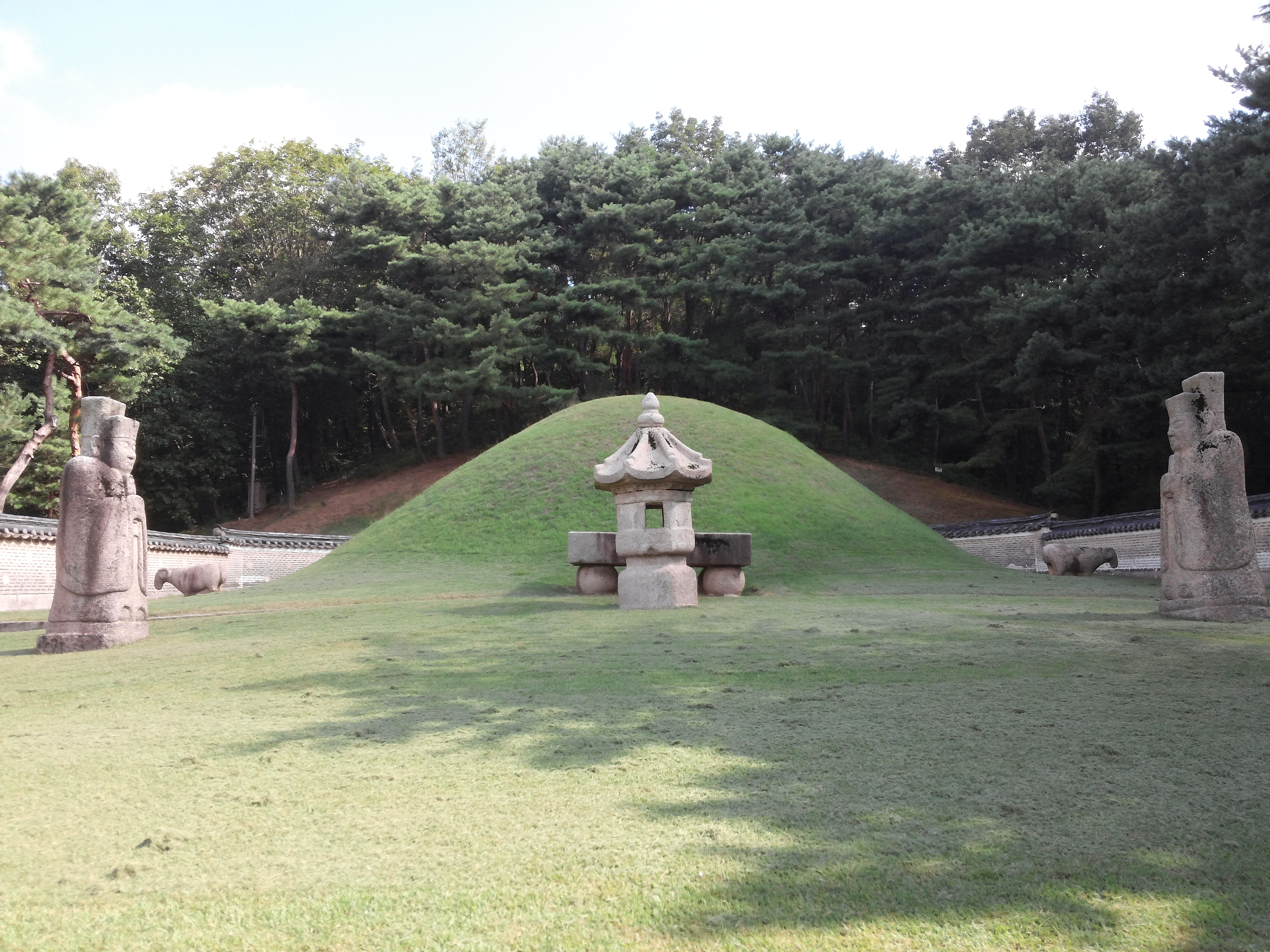
The tomb of Crown Prince Ŭigyŏng

Yi Chang was buried within Gyeongneung (경릉), today part of the Seooreung Cluster, in Goyang, Gyeonggi Province. Because the tomb was built according to the specifications for a crown prince, it is much simpler than that of his wife, who was later buried alongside him as grand queen dowager.

== Family ==
- Father: King Sejo (세조대왕; 11 November 1417 – 2 October 1468)
  - Grandfather: King Sejong (세종대왕; 15 May 1397 – 8 April 1450)
  - Grandmother: Queen Sohŏn (소헌왕후), of the Cheongsong Shim clan (청송 심씨; 20 October 1395 – 28 April 1446)
- Mother: Queen Jeonghui (정희왕후), of the Papyeong Yun clan (파평 윤씨; 25 December 1418 – 15 May 1483)
  - Grandfather: Yun Beon (윤번), Internal Prince Papyeong (파평부원군; 1384–1448)
  - Grandmother: Grand Internal Princess Consort Heungnyeong (흥녕부대부인), of the Incheon Yi clan (인천 이씨; 1383–1456)

Consort(s) and their respective issue

- Queen Sohye (소혜왕후), of the Cheongju Han clan (청주 한씨; 16 October 1437 – 21 May 1504)
  - Yi Jeong (이정), Grand Prince Wolsan (월산대군; 14 January 1455 – 31 January 1489), first son
  - Princess Myeongsuk (명숙공주; 1456 – 23 November 1482), given name Gyeong-geun (경근), first daughter
  - Yi Hyeol (이혈), King Seongjong (성종대왕; 28 August 1457 – 29 January 1495), second son
- Gwiin (귀인), of the Andong Gwon clan (안동 권씨; ? – 8 June 1494)
- Gwiin (귀인), of the Papyeong Yun clan (파평 윤씨)
- Sugui (숙의), of the Geochang Shin clan (거창 신씨; ? – 16 June 1476)

== Ancestry ==
Ancestors of Crown Prince Ŭigyŏng

King Taejo (태조대왕)
King Taejong (태종대왕)
Queen Sinui, of the Cheongju Han clan (신의왕후 청주 한씨)
King Sejong (세종대왕)
Min Je, Internal Prince Yeoheung (여흥부원군 민제)
Queen Wongyeong, of the Yeoheung Min clan (원경왕후 여흥 민씨)
Grand Princess Consort of Samhan State, of the Yeosan Song clan (삼한국대부인 여산 송씨)
King Sejo (세조대왕)
Shim Deok-bu (심덕부)
Shim On, Internal Prince Cheongcheon (청천부원군 심온)
Lady, of the Incheon Mun clan (인천 문씨)
Queen Soheon, of the Cheongsong Shim clan (소헌왕후 청송 심씨)
An Cheon-bo (안천보)
Grand Princess Consort of Samhan State, of the Sunheung An clan (삼한국대부인 순흥 안씨)
Lady, of the Yeongju Kim clan (영주 김씨)
Crown Prince Ŭigyŏng
Yun Cheok (윤척)
Yun Seung-rye (윤승례)
Lady, of the Jeonui Yi clan (전의 이씨)
Yun Beon, Internal Prince Papyeong (파평부원군 윤번)
Gwon Hang (권항)
Lady, of the Andong Gwon clan (안동 권씨)
Queen Jeonghui, of the Papyeong Yun clan (정희왕후 파평 윤씨)
Yi Sim (이심)
Yi Mun-hwa (이문화)
Lady, of the Andong Gwon clan (안동 권씨)
Grand Internal Princess Consort Heungnyeong, of the Incheon Yi clan (흥녕부대부인 인천 이씨)
Choe Ryeom (최렴)
Lady, of the Chungju Choe clan (충주 최씨)
Lady, of the Goseong Yi clan (고성 이씨)

== In popular culture ==
- Portrayed by Baek Sung-hyun in the 2011 JTBC TV series Insu, the Queen Mother.
- Portrayed by Kwon Hyun-sang in the 2011 KBS2 TV series The Princess' Man.

== See also ==
- Styles and titles in Joseon
- History of Korea
- Politics of Joseon
