= Yejong of Joseon =

King of Joseon from 1468 to 1470

Yejong

King of Joseon
- Reign: 1 October 1468 – 9 January 1470
- Enthronement: Central Gate, Suganggung
- Predecessor: Sejo
- Successor: Seongjong

Crown Prince of Joseon
- Tenure: 9 January 1458 — 1 October 1468
- Predecessor: Crown Prince Chang
- Successor: Crown Prince Yung
- Born: 23 January 1450; Hanseong, Joseon
- Died: 9 January 1470 (aged 19); Jamidang, Gyeongbokgung, Hanseong, Joseon
- Burial: Changneung, Seooreung Cluster, Goyang, South Korea
- Spouses: Queen Jangsun (m. 1460; died 1462) Queen Ansun (m. 1468)
- Issue Detail: Seongjong of Joseon (adopted)
Names
- Yi Hwang (이황; 李晄)
Era dates
- Adopted the era name of the Ming dynasty (Note: Seonghwa (Chenghua) (성화; 成化): 1468–1470)
Posthumous name
- Joseon: Great King Yangdo Heummun Seongmu Uiin Sohyo (양도흠문성무의인소효대왕; 襄悼欽文聖武懿仁昭孝大王); Ming dynasty: Yangdo (양도; 襄悼)
Temple name
- Yejong (예종; 睿宗)
- House: Jeonju Yi
- Dynasty: Yi
- Father: King Sejo
- Mother: Queen Jeonghui
- Religion: Confucianism (Neo-Confucianism) → Buddhism

Korean name
- Hangul: 예종
- Hanja: 睿宗
- Lit.: "Farsighted Ancestor"
- RR: Yejong
- MR: Yejong

Royal title
- Hangul: 해양대군
- Hanja: 海陽大君
- RR: Haeyang daegun
- MR: Haeyang taegun

Courtesy name
- Hangul: 평보, 명조
- Hanja: 平甫, 明照
- RR: Pyeongbo, Myeongjo
- MR: P'yŏngbo, Myŏngjo

Yejong (Korean: 예종; Hanja: 睿宗; 23 January 1450 – 9 January 1470), (Note: In the Korean calendar (lunisolar), he was born on the 1st day of the 1st lunar month and died 28th day of the 11th lunar month.) personal name Yi Hwang, was the eighth monarch of Joseon. He was the third son of King Sejo and the younger brother of Crown Prince Uigyeong. Too physically ill to properly govern, he died 15 months after acceding to the throne.

One of the most prominent incidents during his reign was the trial and death of General Nam I, who was famous for having suppressed Yi Siae's Rebellion alongside General Gang Sun. At the age of 28, Nam I was appointed as minister of war. However, when Yejong took the throne, Yu Chagwang, who was jealous of Nam I, accused him of treason when he found out that the king himself was not fond of the general. Yu also involved Gang Sun and initiated a trial witnessed by Yejong. They were found guilty and executed, while Yu Chagwang was promoted to a high office. After this incident, there were many cases of Yu accusing ministers who were apparently more prestigious than himself.

== Biography ==
He was born in 1450 as the second son of Grand Prince Suyang (as King Sejo was known at the time) and his primary consort, Grand Internal Princess Consort Nakrang (later Queen Jeonghui). He was promoted to crown prince at the age of 7, after the sudden death of his elder brother, Crown Prince Uigyeong.

In 1468, his father abdicated, but since Yi Hwang was not yet 20 years old and had been physically weak since his childhood, his mother, Queen Dowager Jaseong, came to unofficially rule as Queen Regent for the nation instead. According to records of this era, political decisions were taken by the queen and three subjects nominated by King Sejo.

Although his reign lasted just 14 months, several incidents had occurred. In 1468, the treason of Nam I greatly influenced the court politics. Just before his death in 1469, Joseon started to prohibit all trade with Japan. Yi Hwang also granted common farmers the right to cultivate fields which originally belonged to the military.

He died shortly before his 20th birthday and was buried alongside his second wife, Queen Ansun, in the Seooneung Cluster located in Goyang, Gyeonggi Province. Their tomb is known as Changneung (창릉).

After Yejong's death, the throne was not inherited by his son. Instead, his nephew and the second son of Crown Prince Uigyeong, Grand Prince Jalsan, became the heir and was posthumously honored as King Seongjong.

Both of Yejong's sons, Grand Prince Inseong and Grand Prince Jean, died without issue. In 1874, during the reign of Gojong, Yi Ong, Prince Seoseong of the Third Junior Rank (서성부정 이옹; 1487–1510) and a great-great-grandson of Sejong the Great, was posthumously appointed as heir to Grand Prince Inseong. Similarly, Yi Pa (이파; 1515–1571), a great-great-grandson of Jeongjong of Joseon, was also granted the title Prince Nakpung (Nakpung Gun; 낙풍군) and became heir to Grand Prince Jean.

== Family ==
- Father: King Sejo (세조대왕; 11 November 1417 – 2 October 1468)
  - Grandfather: King Sejong (세종대왕; 15 May 1397 – 8 April 1450)
  - Grandmother: Queen Soheon (소헌왕후), of the Cheongsong Shim clan (청송 심씨; 20 October 1395 – 28 April 1446)
- Mother: Queen Jeonghui (정희왕후), of the Papyeong Yun clan (파평 윤씨; 25 December 1418 – 15 May 1483)
  - Grandfather: Yun Beon (윤번), Internal Prince Papyeong (파평부원군; 1384–1448)
  - Grandmother: Grand Internal Princess Consort Heungnyeong (흥녕부대부인), of the Incheon Yi clan (인천 이씨; 1383–1456)

Consort(s) and their respective issue

- Queen Jangsun (장순왕후), of the Cheongju Han clan (청주 한씨; 3 March 1445 – 14 January 1462)
  - Yi Bun (이분), Grand Prince Inseong (인성대군; 31 December 1461 – 4 December 1463), first son
- Queen Ansun (안순왕후), of the Cheongju Han clan (청주 한씨; 27 April 1445 – 12 February 1499)
  - Princess Hyeonsuk (현숙공주; 28 March 1464 – 2 July 1502), first daughter
  - Yi Hyeon (이현), Grand Prince Jean (제안대군; 8 March 1466 – 6 January 1526), second son
  - Princess Hyesun (혜순공주; 1468 – 19 September 1469), second daughter
  - Unnamed son
  - Yi Hyeol (이혈), King Seongjong (성종대왕; 28 August 1457 – 29 January 1495), adopted son
- Concubine Gong (공빈), of the Jeonju Choe clan (전주 최씨)
- Palace Lady (상궁), of the Gi clan (기씨; ?–1489) (Note: Sanggung (상궁; 尚宫); female official of the senior fifth rank in the internal court.)
- Lady, of the Yi clan (이씨)

== Ancestry ==
Ancestors of Yejong of Joseon

King Taejo (태조대왕)
King Taejong (태종대왕)
Queen Sinui, of the Cheongju Han clan (신의왕후 청주 한씨)
King Sejong (세종대왕)
Min Je, Internal Prince Yeoheung (여흥부원군 민제)
Queen Wongyeong, of the Yeoheung Min clan (원경왕후 여흥 민씨)
Grand Princess Consort of Samhan State, of the Yeosan Song clan (삼한국대부인 여산 송씨)
King Sejo (세조대왕)
Shim Deok-bu (심덕부)
Shim On, Internal Prince Cheongcheon (청천부원군 심온)
Lady, of the Incheon Mun clan (인천 문씨)
Queen Soheon, of the Cheongsong Shim clan (소헌왕후 청송 심씨)
An Cheon-bo (안천보)
Grand Princess Consort of Samhan State, of the Sunheung An clan (삼한국대부인 순흥 안씨)
Lady, of the Yeongju Kim clan (영주 김씨)
King Yejong
Yun Cheok (윤척)
Yun Seung-rye (윤승례)
Lady, of the Jeonui Yi clan (전의 이씨)
Yun Beon, Internal Prince Papyeong (파평부원군 윤번)
Gwon Hang (권항)
Lady, of the Andong Gwon clan (안동 권씨)
Queen Jeonghui, of the Papyeong Yun clan (정희왕후 파평 윤씨)
Yi Sim (이심)
Yi Mun-hwa (이문화)
Lady, of the Andong Gwon clan (안동 권씨)
Grand Internal Princess Consort Heungnyeong, of the Incheon Yi clan (흥녕부대부인 인천 이씨)
Choe Ryeom (최렴)
Lady, of the Chungju Choe clan (충주 최씨)
Lady, of the Goseong Yi clan (고성 이씨)

== In popular culture ==
- Portrayed by Lee Young-hoo in the 1998–2000 KBS1 TV series The King and the Queen.
- Portrayed by Yoo Dong-hyuk in the 2007–2008 SBS TV series The King and I.
- Portrayed by Noh Young-hak in the 2011–2012 JTBC TV series Insu, the Queen Mother.
- Portrayed by Lee Sun-kyun in the 2017 film The King's Case Note.
- Inspired a fictional prince portrayed by Moon Sang-min in the 2022 tvN TV series Under the Queen's Umbrella.

== See also ==
- History of Korea
- List of monarchs of Korea
- Styles and titles in Joseon

== Notes ==
Yejong of Joseon House of Yi Born: 23 January 1450 Died: 9 January 1470
Regnal titles
Preceded by Sejo	King of Joseon; 1 October 1468 – 9 January 1470	Succeeded by Seongjong
