= Sinwon-dong =

Neighborhood in Seoul, South Korea

Coordinates: 37°26′N 127°04′E

- Interactive map of Sinwon-dong
- Country: South Korea

Korean name
- Hangul: 신원동
- Hanja: 新院洞
- RR: Sinwon-dong
- MR: Sinwŏn-dong

Sinwon-dong (Korean: 신원동) is a dong (neighbourhood) of Seocho District, Seoul, South Korea. It is a legal dong (법정동 法定洞) administered under its administrative dong (행정동 行政洞), Naegok-dong.

== See also ==
- Administrative divisions of South Korea
