= Insu, the Queen Mother =

2011 South Korean television series

- Promotional poster
- Also known as: Queen Insoo
- Hangul: 인수대비
- Hanja: 仁粹大妃
- RR: Insu daebi
- MR: Insu taebi
- Genre: Historical
- Written by: Jung Ha-yeon
- Directed by: Lee Tae-gon; Noh Jong-chan; Kim Jae-hong
- Starring: Chae Shi-ra; Hahm Eun-jung; Kim Young-ho; Kim Mi-sook; Baek Sung-hyun; Jeon Hye-bin
- Composer: Lee Ji-yong
- Country of origin: South Korea
- Original language: Korean
- No. of episodes: 60

Production
- Executive producer: Lee Young-joon
- Producer: Jo Joon-hyung
- Running time: Saturdays and Sundays at 20:55 (KST)
- Production companies: Drama house JTBC

Original release
- Network: jTBC
- Release: 3 December 2011 – 24 June 2012

Insu, the Queen Mother (Korean: 인수대비) is a 2011 South Korean historical television series, starring Chae Shi-ra, Hahm Eun-jung, Kim Young-ho, Kim Mi-sook, Baek Sung-hyun and Jeon Hye-bin. Focusing on the fierce power struggle among three women in the royal court of the Joseon period, it aired from December 3, 2011, to June 24, 2012, on Saturdays and Sundays at 20:55 (KST) for 60 episodes. It was one of the inaugural dramas on newly launched cable channel jTBC.

Chae Shi-ra reprised the role of Queen Insu; she previously played the same character in the 1998–2000 period drama The King and the Queen, also written by Jung Ha-yeon. She said she joined the series because she wanted to explore the character further, "This drama series focuses more on the ambitious side of Queen Insu, who dreams of becoming the absolute ruler of the Joseon Dynasty, and I liked the part."

== Cast ==
- Chae Shi-ra as Queen Insu (23–60)
  - Hahm Eun-jung as Han Jung (the future Queen Insu) (1–23)
- Kim Mi-sook as Lady Yun, later Queen Jeonghui
- Kim Young-ho as Grand Prince Suyang, later King Sejo
- Baek Sung-hyun as Crown Prince Uigyeong (1–23) & Seongjong of Joseon (40–54) (dual role)
- Jeon Hye-bin as Deposed Queen Yoon (23–54)
  - Jin Ji-hee as Yoon Song-yi (the future Queen Yoon) (1–23)
- Kim Ga-yeon as Lady Han, Prince Gyeyang's wife and Jung's older sister
- Han In-soo as Kim Jong-seo
- Lee Kwang-ki as Grand Prince Anpyeong
- Shim Yang-hong as Hwangbo In
- Choi Ji-na as Lady Yang Hye-bin, Sejong's concubine
- Jang Yong as Han Hwak
- Kim Yong-hee as Gwon Ram
- Kwon Ki-seon as Lady Shin, Song-yi's mother
- Lee Deok-hee as Court lady Kim
- Seo Yi-sook as Court lady Park
- Baek Su-ho as Yoon-goo
- Joo Min-soo as Yoon-woo
- Chae Sang-woo as King Danjong
- Son Byong-ho as Han Myung-hoe
- Yoo Ho-rin as Cho-sun
- Jo Jung-eun as Queen Jeongsun, Danjong's wife
- Choi Won-hong as Prince Jasan, later young King Seongjong (23–40)
- Jin Tae-hyun as King Yeonsan
- Jeon So-min as Jang Nok-su, Yeonsan's concubine
- Hong So-hee as Queen Shin, Yeonsan's wife
- Kwon Min as Heo Chim
- Kang Cho-hee as Lady Gwon Suk-ui
- Yoo Gyeom as Prince Hannam
- Sunwoo Jae-duk as King Munjong
- Jeon Moo-song as King Sejong
- Noh Young-hak as Grand Prince Haeyang, later King Yejong
- Lee Yeon-doo as Queen Ansun, Yejong's second wife
- Yoon Joo as Se-seon

== Ratings ==
| Episode | Original broadcast date | Average audience share |
| Episode | Original broadcast date | AGB Ratings (Nationwide) |
|---|---|---|
| 1 | December 3, 2011 | 1.270% |
| 2 | December 4, 2011 | 1.082% |
| 3 | December 10, 2011 | 1.064% |
| 4 | December 11, 2011 | 0.892% |
| 5 | December 17, 2011 | 1.011% |
| 6 | December 18, 2011 | 1.105% |
| 7 | December 24, 2011 | 0.893% |
| 8 | December 25, 2011 | 1.037% |
| 9 | December 31, 2011 | 1.159% |
| 10 | January 1, 2012 | 1.245% |
| 11 | January 7, 2012 | 0.832% (5th) |
| 12 | January 8, 2012 | 1.039% (2nd) |
| 13 | January 14, 2012 | 0.864% (5th) |
| 14 | January 15, 2012 | 1.129% (2nd) |
| 15 | January 21, 2012 | 0.885% (4th) |
| 16 | January 22, 2012 | 0.990% (1st) |
| 17 | January 28, 2012 | 1.104% (3rd) |
| 18 | January 29, 2012 | 1.183% (4th) |
| 19 | February 4, 2012 | 1.106% (2nd) |
| 20 | February 5, 2012 | 1.423% (1st) |
| 21 | February 11, 2012 | 1.237% (3rd) |
| 22 | February 12, 2012 | 1.147% (3rd) |
| 23 | February 18, 2012 | 1.181% (4th) |
| 24 | February 19, 2012 | 1.534% (1st) |
| 25 | February 25, 2012 | 0.844% (9th) |
| 26 | February 26, 2012 | 1.612% (2nd) |
| 27 | March 3, 2012 | 1.083% (4th) |
| 28 | March 4, 2012 | 1.430% (1st) |
| 29 | March 10, 2012 | 1.667% (1st) |
| 30 | March 11, 2012 | 1.698% (1st) |
| 31 | March 17, 2012 | 1.339% (3rd) |
| 32 | March 18, 2012 | 1.361% (3rd) |
| 33 | March 24, 2012 | 1.261% (5th) |
| 34 | March 25, 2012 | 1.571% (1st) |
| 35 | March 31, 2012 | 1.161% (3rd) |
| 36 | April 1, 2012 | 1.385% (3rd) |
| 37 | April 7, 2012 | 1.400% (2nd) |
| 38 | April 8, 2012 | 1.523% (2nd) |
| 39 | April 14, 2012 | 1.692% (1st) |
| 40 | April 15, 2012 | 1.586% (1st) |
| 41 | April 21, 2012 | 1.616% (1st) |
| 42 | April 22, 2012 | 1.718% (2nd) |
| 43 | April 28, 2012 | 1.969% (1st) |
| 44 | April 29, 2012 | 2.039% (1st) |
| 45 | May 5, 2012 | 1.542% (1st) |
| 46 | May 6, 2012 | 1.904% (1st) |
| 47 | May 12, 2012 | 1.877% (1st) |
| 48 | May 13, 2012 | 2.244% (1st) |
| 49 | May 19, 2012 | 1.755% (1st) |
| 50 | May 20, 2012 | 2.496% (1st) |
| 51 | May 26, 2012 | 2.791% (1st) |
| 52 | May 27, 2012 | 2.312% (1st) |
| 53 | June 2, 2012 | 2.372% (1st) |
| 54 | June 3, 2012 | 2.593% (1st) |
| 55 | June 9, 2012 | 2.200% (2nd) |
| 56 | June 10, 2012 | 2.589% (1st) |
| 57 | June 16, 2012 | 2.045% (1st) |
| 58 | June 17, 2012 | 2.282% (1st) |
| 59 | June 23, 2012 | 2.474% (1st) |
| 60 | June 24, 2012 | 2.927% (1st) |
| Average | | 1,546% |

- In this table, the blue numbers represent the lowest ratings and the red numbers represent the highest ratings.
- Cable/Pay TV usually have a relatively smaller audience compared to free-to-air TV/public broadcasters (KBS, SBS, MBC and EBS).

== Awards and nominations ==
| Year | Award | Category | Recipient | Result | Ref |
|---|---|---|---|---|---|
| 2012 | The 5th Korea Drama Festival | TV Jury Special Award | Insu, the Queen Mother | Won | |
| 2012 | APAN Star Awards | Best Dressed | Jeon Hye-bin | Won | |

== International broadcast ==
| Country | Channel | Premiere | Native Title | Notes |
|---|---|---|---|---|
| Singapore | VV Drama | January 23, 2013 | 仁粹大妃 | |
| Hong Kong | Drama Channel | June 3, 2013 | 仁粹大妃 | |
| Japan | BS-TBS | September 8, 2014 | インス大妃 | |
| Hong Kong | CABLE No.1 | March 12, 2015 | 仁粹大妃 | |
| Japan | BS-TBS | August 14, 2015 | インス大妃 | Re-broadcast |
| Taiwan | EBC | September 26, 2015 | 仁粹大妃 | |

== Media release ==
The series was released as a 3-DVD box set in Japan on March 22, April 26 and May 24, 2013, under NHK Enterprises.
