= Seongjong of Joseon =

King of Joseon from 1470 to 1495

Seongjong

King of Joseon
- Reign: 9 January 1470 – 29 January 1495
- Enthronement: Geunjeongjeon, Gyeongbokgung
- Predecessor: Yejong
- Successor: Yeonsangun
- Regent: Grand Queen Dowager Jaseong (1470–1476)
- Born: 28 August 1457; Hanseong, Joseon
- Died: 29 January 1495 (aged 37); Daejojeon, Changdeokgung, Hanseong, Joseon
- Burial: Seolleung, Seoul, South Korea
- Spouse: Queen Gonghye (m. 1467; died 1474) Deposed Queen Yun (m. 1476; dep. 1479) Queen Jeonghyeon (m. 1480)
- Issue Detail: Yeonsangun of Joseon; Jungjong of Joseon
Names
- Yi Hyeol (이혈; 李娎)
Era dates
- Adopted the era name of the Ming dynasty (Note: Seonghwa (Chenghua) (성화; 成化): 1470–1487 Hongchi (Hongzhi) (홍치; 弘治): 1488–1495)
Posthumous name
- Joseon: Great King Gangjeong Inmun Heonmu Heumseong Gonghyo (강정인문헌무흠성공효대왕; 康靖仁文憲武欽聖恭孝大王); Ming dynasty: Gangjeong (강정; 康靖)
Temple name
- Seongjong (성종; 成宗)
- Clan: Jeonju Yi
- Dynasty: Yi
- Father: King Deokjong (biological); King Yejong (adoptive)
- Mother: Queen Sohye (biological); Queen Ansun (adoptive)
- Religion: Confucianism (Neo-Confucianism)

Korean name
- Hangul: 성종
- Hanja: 成宗
- Lit.: "Accomplished Ancestor"
- RR: Seongjong
- MR: Sŏngjong

Royal title
- Hangul: 잘산군; 자을산군
- Hanja: 乽山君; 者乙山君
- RR: Jalsangun; Jaeulsangun
- MR: Chalsan'gun; Chaŭlsan'gun

Childhood name
- Hangul: 경신
- Hanja: 慶新
- RR: Gyeongsin
- MR: Kyŏngsin

Seongjong (Korean: 성종; Hanja: 成宗; 28 August 1457 – 29 January 1495), (Note: In the Korean calendar (lunisolar), he was born on the 30th day of the 7th lunar month and died on the 24th day of the 12th lunar month.) personal name Yi Hyeol, was the ninth monarch of Joseon. The younger son of Crown Prince Uigyeong and a grandson of King Sejo, he acceded to the throne upon the death of his sickly uncle, King Yejong.

== Biography ==
=== Early life ===
Yi Hyeol was born as the second son of Crown Prince Yi Jang and Crown Princess Su of the Cheongju Han clan. His father however died few months after his birth. In 1461, he was named Prince Jasan (자산군) which was changed to Prince Jalsan (잘산군) in 1468.

In 1467, he married Han Song-yi, the youngest daughter of Han Myŏnghoe. One of Lady Han's older sisters was the late Queen Jangsun, first wife of King Yejong.

Despite having an older brother and his uncle leaving behind a biological son, Jalsan was chosen as successor and was made the adopted son of King Yejong and his second wife, Queen Han (posthumously known as Queen Ansun).

After he ascended to the throne, his biological father was honored with the temple name "Deokjong" (덕종; 德宗), while his mother became queen and was given the honorary name "Insu" (인수; 仁粹).

=== Reign ===
Since Seongjong was only 12 when he was crowned, his grandmother Grand Queen Dowager Jaseong, ruled the nation along with his biological mother Queen Insu, and his aunt (and adoptive mother) Queen Dowager Inhye. In 1476, at the age of 19, he began to govern the country in his own name.

After the death of his first wife in 1474, Seongjong decided to promote one of his concubines, Lady Yun, to the status of primary wife and queen. Lady Yun was later executed due to her attempts to poison other concubines and harm the King, and her execution would become a major reason behind the tyranny of Seongjong's successor, Yeonsangun of Joseon.

His reign was marked by the prosperity and growth of the economy, based on the laws laid down by Taejong, Sejong, and Sejo. He himself was a gifted ruler. In 1474, the Grand Code for State Administration, started by his grandfather, was completed and put into effect. Seongjong also ordered revisions and improvements to the code.

He greatly expanded the Office of Special Advisors (Hongmungwan; 홍문관, 弘文館), an advisory council to the king, which also served as royal library and research institute; he strengthened the Three Offices (Samsa; 삼사, 三司) – Office of the Inspector General (Saheonbu), Office of Censors (Saganwon) and Office of Special Advisors (Hongmungwan)– as a check and balance on the royal court. For the first time since Sejong the Great, Confucian scholars whose political views clashed with those of the conservative officials (members of the nobility who had helped Taejong and Sejo in their rise to power), were brought to court. By appointing able administrators regardless of their political views, Seongjong made his rule more effective and his policies resulted in many positive innovations, increasing his number of supporters. During Seongjong's reign, he also prohibited the construction of new monasteries and the ordination of new monks.

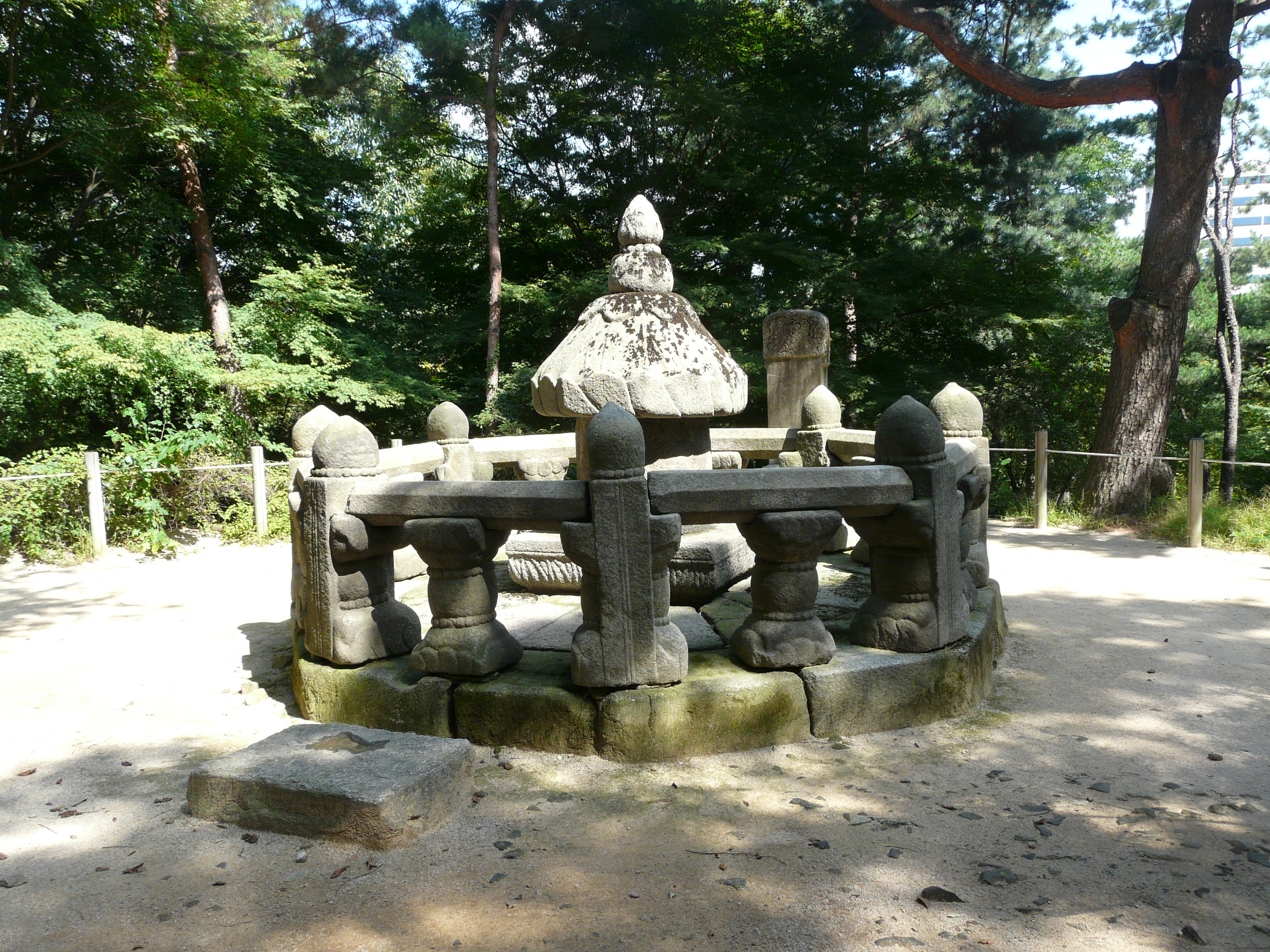
Taesil (placental burial chamber) of King Seongjong

The king himself was an artist and intellectual, and liked to argue about the finer points of politics with the more liberal scholars. He encouraged the publication of numerous books about geography and social etiquette, as well as areas of knowledge that benefited the common people.

It was under Seongjong's reign that the "Widow Remarriage Ban" (1477) was enacted, which strengthened pre-existing social stigma against women who remarried by barring their sons from public office. In 1489, Yi Gu-ji, a woman from the royal clan, committed suicide at his order and was erased from family records, when it was discovered that she had cohabited with her slave after being widowed.

In 1491, Seongjong started a military campaign against the Jurchens on the northern border, like many of his predecessors. Led by General Heo Jong (허종; 許琮), the campaign was successful, and the defeated Jurchens commanded by Udige (兀狄哈) retreated to the north of Amrok River.

=== Death ===
He died in January 1495 and is buried in the south of Seoul. The tomb is known as Seonneung (선릉) and 35 years later, his third wife, Queen Jeonghyeon, was also interred here. Seongjong was succeeded by his son, Crown Prince Yi Yung.

== Family ==
- Biological father: King Deokjong (덕종대왕; 12 October 1438 – 29 September 1457)
  - Grandfather: King Sejo (세조대왕; 11 November 1417 – 2 October 1468)
  - Grandmother: Queen Jeonghui (정희왕후), of the Papyeong Yun clan (파평 윤씨; 25 December 1418 – 15 May 1483)
- Adoptive father: King Yejong (예종대왕; 23 January 1450 – 9 January 1470)
- Biological mother: Queen Sohye (소혜왕후), of the Cheongju Han clan (청주 한씨; 16 October 1437 – 21 May 1504)
  - Grandfather: Han Hwak (한확), Internal Prince Seowon (서원부원군; 1400 – 19 October 1456)
  - Grandmother: Internal Princess Consort Namyang (남양부부인), of the Namyang Hong clan (남양 홍씨; 1403–1450)
- Adoptive mother: Queen Ansun (안순왕후), of the Cheongju Han clan (청주 한씨; 27 April 1445 – 12 February 1499)

Consort(s) and their respective issue

- Queen Gonghye (공혜왕후), of the Cheongju Han clan (청주 한씨; 17 November 1456 – 9 May 1474), given name Song-yi (송이)
- Deposed Queen (폐비), of the Haman Yun clan (함안 윤씨; 24 July 1455 – 7 September 1482)
  - Unnamed son (1474–1475) (Note: His childhood name was Hyo-shin (효신).)
  - Yi Yung (이융), Yeonsangun (연산군; 2 December 1476 – 30 November 1506), first son
  - Unnamed son (1479)
- Queen Jeonghyeon (정현왕후), of the Papyeong Yun clan (파평 윤씨; 30 July 1462 – 23 September 1530), given name Chang-nyeon (창년)
  - Princess Sunsuk (순숙공주; 1478 – 20 August 1488), first daughter
  - Unnamed daughter (1485–1486)
  - Yi Yeok (이역), King Jungjong (중종대왕; 25 April 1488 – 9 December 1544), eighth son
  - Unnamed daughter (1490)
- Concubine Myeong (명빈), of the (old) Andong Kim clan (구 안동 김씨)
  - Princess Hwisuk (휘숙옹주), fourth daughter
  - Princess Gyeongsuk (경숙옹주; 19 September 1483 – ?), given name Hap-hwan (합환), seventh daughter
  - Yi Jong (이종), Prince Musan (무산군; 1490 – 20 August 1525), 13th son
  - Princess Hwijeong (휘정옹주), 11th daughter
- Gwiin (귀인), of the Yeongwol Eom clan (영월 엄씨; ? – 14 April 1504)
  - Princess Gongsin (공신옹주; 18 April 1481 – 15 March 1549), fifth daughter
- Gwiin (귀인), of the Chogye Jeong clan (초계 정씨; ? – 14 April 1504)
  - Yi Hang (이항), Prince Anyang (안양군; 29 March 1480 – 15 July 1505), third son
  - Yi Bong (이봉), Prince Bongan (봉안군; 9 November 1482 – 15 July 1505), sixth son
  - Princess Jeonghye (정혜옹주; 4 April 1490 – 22 September 1507), given name Seung-bok (승복), 12th daughter
- Gwiin (귀인), of the Andong Gwon clan (안동 권씨; 1471–1500)
  - Yi Byeon (이변), Prince Jeonseong (전성군; 1490–1505), 12th son
- Gwiin (귀인), of the Uiryeong Nam clan (의령 남씨)
- Soui (소의), of the Yi clan (이씨)
- Sugui (숙의), of the Namyang Hong clan (남양 홍씨; 23 August 1457– 24 October 1510)
  - Princess Hyesuk (혜숙옹주; 6 September 1478 – ?), given name Su-ran (수란), second daughter
  - Yi Su (이수), Prince Wanwon (완원군; 28 January 1481 – 7 December 1509), fourth son
  - Yi Yeom (이염), Prince Hoesan (회산군; 2 January 1482 – 1512), fifth son
  - Yi Don (이돈), Prince Gyeonseong (견성군; 1482 – 20 November 1507), seventh son
  - Princess Jeongsun (정순옹주; 17 November 1486 – ?), given name Bok-ran (복란), eighth daughter
  - Yi Hoe (이회), Prince Ikyang (익양군; 7 August 1488 – 15 February 1552), ninth son
  - Yi Chim (이침), Prince Gyeongmyeong (경명군; 6 October 1489 – 4 July 1552), 11th son
  - Yi In (이인), Prince Uncheon (운천군; 13 January 1491 – 25 June 1524), 15th son
  - Yi Hui (이희), Prince Yangwon (양원군; 1491 – 12 May 1551), 16th son
  - Princess Jeongsuk (정숙옹주; 1493 – 22 March 1573), given name Yeo-ran (여란), 13th daughter
- Sugui (숙의), of the Jinju Ha clan (진주 하씨)
  - Yi Sun (이순), Prince Gyesong (계성군; 1480–1504), second son
- Sugui (숙의), of the Jeong clan (정씨)
- Sugyong (숙용), of the Cheongsong Shim clan (청송 심씨; 1465 – 30 December 1515)
  - Princess Gyeongsun (경순옹주; 1482–?), given name Ok-hwan (옥환), sixth daughter
  - Princess Sukhye (숙혜옹주; 1486 – 23 July 1525), given name Byeok-hwan (벽환), ninth daughter
  - Yi Gwan (이관), Prince Yiseong (이성군; 20 February 1489 – 23 January 1553), 10th son
  - Yi Jeon (이전), Prince Yeongsan (영산군; 6 November 1490 – 6 July 1538), 14th son
- Sugyong (숙용), of the Gwon clan (권씨)
  - Unnamed son (1486–?) (Note: His childhood name was Gyeon-seok (견석).)
  - Princess Gyeonghwi (경휘옹주; ? – 6 February 1525), given name Jeong-bok (정복), 10th daughter
- Sugwon (숙원), of the Yun clan (윤씨; ?–1533)
- Unknown
  - Princess Suksin (숙신옹주; 1478 – 20 August 1487 or 8 November 1489), third daughter

== Ancestry ==
Ancestors of Seongjong of Joseon

King Taejong (태종대왕)
King Sejong (세종대왕)
Queen Wongyeong, of the Yeoheung Min clan (원경왕후 여흥 민씨)
King Sejo (세조대왕)
Shim On, Internal Prince Cheongcheon (청천부원군 심온)
Queen Soheon, of the Cheongsong Shim clan (소헌왕후 청송 심씨)
Grand Princess Consort of Samhan State, of the Sunheung An clan (삼한국대부인 순흥 안씨)
King Deokjong (덕종대왕)
Yun Seung-rye (윤승례)
Yun Beon, Internal Prince Papyeong (파평부원군 윤번)
Lady, of the Andong Gwon clan (안동 권씨)
Queen Jeonghui, of the Papyeong Yun clan (정희왕후 파평 윤씨)
Yi Mun-hwa (이문화)
Internal Princess Consort Heungnyeong, of the Incheon Yi clan (흥녕부부인 인천 이씨)
Lady, of the Chungju Choe clan (충주 최씨)
King Seongjong
Han Yeong (한영)
Han Yeong-jeong (한영정)
Lady, of the Andong Gwon clan (안동 권씨)
Han Hwak, Internal Prince Seowon (서원부원군 한확)
Kim Yeong-ryeol (김영렬)
Lady, of the Uiseong Kim clan (의성 김씨)
Queen Sohye, of the Cheongju Han clan (소혜왕후 청주 한씨)
Hong Gil-min (홍길민)
Hong Yeo-bang (홍여방)
Lady, of the Cheongju Gyeong clan (청주 경씨)
Internal Princess Consort Namyang, of the Namyang Hong clan (남양부부인 남양 홍씨)
Jeong Bu (정부)
Lady, of the Dongnae Jeong clan (동래 정씨)

== In popular culture ==
- Portrayed by Yun Sun-hong in the 1985 film Eoudong.
- Portrayed by Yoon Yang-ha in the 1988 film Diary of King Yeonsan.
- Portrayed by Hyun Suk in the 1995 KBS2 TV series Jang Nok Soo.
- Portrayed by Lee Jin-woo in the 1998–2000 KBS1 TV series The King and the Queen.
- Portrayed by Yoo Seung-ho and Go Joo-won in the 2007–2008 SBS TV series The King and I.
- Portrayed by Choi Won-hong and Baek Sung-hyun in the 2011–2012 JTBC TV series Insu, the Queen Mother.
- Portrayed by Choi Moo-sung in the 2017 MBC TV series The Rebel.
- Portrayed by Kim Jeong-hak in the 2017 KBS2 TV series Queen for Seven Days.
- Portrayed by Song Geon-hee in the 2023 MBC TV series Joseon Attorney.

== See also ==
- History of Korea
- List of monarchs of Korea
- Styles and titles in Joseon

== Notes ==
Seongjong of Joseon House of Yi Born: 28 August 1457 Died: 29 January 1495
Royal titles
| Preceded by Yejong | King of Joseon; 9 January 1470 – 29 January 1495 | Succeeded by Yeonsangun |
