= Chungju Choe clan =

Korean clan from North Chungcheong Province

- Country: Korea
- Current region: Chungju
- Founder: Choe Seung

Chungju Choe clan (Korean: 충주 최씨; Hanja: 忠州 崔氏) is one of the Korean clans. Their Bon-gwan is in Chungju, North Chungcheong Province. According to the research held in 2000, the number of Chungju Choe clan’s member was 13466. Their founder was Choe Seung in Tang dynasty. Because Silla had a crop failure in 846, robbers was widespread throughout the country. In response to Emperor Wuzong of Tang’s order, Choe Seung was dispatched to Silla as an armed commander (Hanja: 兵馬使). After that, Choe Seung was appointed as general. Then, Choe Seung was appointed as Yinqing Guanglu Daifu (Hanja: 銀青光祿大夫) because made some achievements when he suppressed revolts. Choe Seung’s descendant founded Chungju Choe clan and made Chungju their Bon-gwan.

== See also ==
- Korean clan names of foreign origin
