= Styles and titles in Joseon =

Royal styles and titles during the Joseon period

During the Joseon period, royal titles and styles (forms of address) had been extensive and complex. The general title of the monarch was king (왕; 王; wang) until Gojong crowned himself emperor (황제; 皇帝; hwangje), a title reserved for the Chinese emperor at that time. Official titles came with official forms of address, depending on who the addressee was and by whom they were addressed.

== Royal family ==
=== Naming ===
When a prince became king, he was addressed as such, his personal name becoming taboo. After the death of a king, he received several names. One is the temple name (묘호; 廟號; myoho), which was given when the spirit tablet was placed in the Jongmyo Shrine. This is the name by which historians usually refer to Joseon kings. It could end in either cho or jo (조; 祖; lit. 'progenitor'), or instead chong or jong (종; 宗; lit. 'ancestor'). The preceding syllable was an adjective suitable to describe the king. The other name was the posthumous name (시호; 諡號; siho). This is a longer name, made up of adjectives characterizing the king's rule. For example, King Gyeongjong's posthumous name is King Tŏngmun Ingmu Sunin Sŏnhyo the Great (덕문익무순인선효대왕; 德文翼武純仁宣孝大王), while his temple name is Kyŏngjong/Gyeongjong (경종; 景宗).

=== Titles and styles ===
Forms of address were combined with names, titles or both, for example:

- Chusang chŏnha (주상 전하; 'His Majesty the King')
- Chungjŏn mama (중전 마마; 'Her Royal Highness the Queen')
- Seja chŏha (세자 저하; 'His Royal Highness the Crown Prince')
- Wangja agissi (왕자 아기씨; 'His Young Highness the Prince') in childhood, then Taegun chaga / Taegam (대군 자가 / 대감; 'His Highness / His Excellency the Grand Prince') in adulthood
- Kongju agissi (공주 아기씨; 'Her Young Highness the Royal Princess') in childhood, then Kongju chaga (공주 자가; 'Her Highness the Royal Princess') in adulthood

	Title			Forms of address				Explanation
English	Hangul	Hanja	McCune–Reischauer	Hangul	Hanja	MR	Rank	Explanation
Monarch
King	왕 주상 임금 나랏님 국왕 금상 상감 대전 과인 제왕	王 主上 — — 國王 今上 上監 大田 寡人 帝王	Wang; Chusang; Imgŭm; Narannim; Kugwang; Kŭmsang; Sanggam; Taejŏn; Kwain; Chewang	전하 마마	殿下 媽媽	Chŏnha; Mama	None	Current monarch; he was addressed in different ways depending on the speaker and the situation
King Emeritus	상왕	上王	Sangwang	전하	殿下	Chŏnha	None	Living king who has voluntarily abdicated in favor of the current king
Grand King Emeritus	태상왕	太上王	T'aesangwang	전하	殿下	Chŏnha	None	An abdicated king whose relinquishment of power precedes that of another king emeritus
Great Late King	선대왕	先大王	Sŏndaewang	마마	媽媽	Mama	None	Deceased king
Late King	선왕	先王	Sŏnwang	마마	媽媽	Mama	None	Deceased king
Great King	대왕	大王	Taewang	마마	媽媽	Mama	None	Deceased king
Principal consort of a monarch
Queen	왕비 중전 국모 내전	王妃 中殿 國母 內殿	Wangbi; Chungjŏn; Kungmo; Naejŏn	마마	媽媽	Mama	None	Wife of a current king
Queen Dowager	대비	大妃	Taebi	마마	媽媽	Mama	None	Used to be the short form of wangdaebi, but later became a lower rank
Queen Dowager or Royal Queen Dowager	왕대비 자전 자선	王大妃 慈殿 慈聖	Wangdaebi; Chajŏn; Chasŏn	마마	媽媽	Mama	None	Wife of a deceased king who lived through one subsequent reign
Grand Queen Dowager	대왕대비	大王大妃	Taewangdaebi	마마	媽媽	Mama	None	Wife of a deceased king who lived through at least two subsequent reigns
Queen	왕후	王后	Wanghu	마마	媽媽	Mama	None	Deceased queen
Parents and parents-in-law of a monarch
Grand Internal Prince	대원군	大院君	Taewŏn'gun	대감	大監	Taegam	None	Father of a king who has never been king himself
Grand Internal Princess Consort	부대부인	府大夫人	Pudaebuin	마님	—	Manim	Senior 1 (정1품)	Wife of a grand internal prince and / or biological mother of a king
Internal Prince	부원군	府院君	Puwŏn'gun	대감	大監	Taegam	Senior 1 (정1품)	Father of a queen
Internal Princess Consort	부부인	府夫人	Pubuin	마님	—	Manim	Senior 1 (정1품)	Wife of an internal prince and / or biological mother of a queen
Monarch's male descendants and their principal consorts
Prince Royal	원자	元子	Wŏnja	아기씨 자가	— 自家	Agissi; Chaga	None	Eldest son of a king, usually by his wife, before being appointed as heir to the throne
Crown Prince	왕세자 세자 동궁 국본	王世子 世子 東宮 國本	Wangseja; Seja; Tonggung; Kukpon	저하 마마	邸下 媽媽	Chŏha; Mama	None	Son of a king who has been appointed as heir to the throne
Crown Princess	왕세자빈 세자빈 빈궁	王世子嬪 世子嬪 嬪宮	Wangsejabin; Sejabin; Pin'gung	마노라 자가	抹樓下 自家	Manora; Chaga	None	Wife of a king's son who has been appointed as heir to the throne
Crown Prince	왕세제 세제 동궁 국본	王世弟 世弟 東宮 國本	Wangseje; Seje; Tonggung; Kukpon	저하 마마	邸下 媽媽	Chŏha; Mama	None	Brother of a king who has been appointed as heir to the throne
Crown Princess	왕세제빈 세제빈 빈궁	王世弟嬪 世弟嬪 嬪宮	Wangsejebin; Sejebin; Pin'gung	마노라 자가	抹樓下 自家	Manora; Chaga	None	Wife of a king's brother who has been appointed as heir to the throne
Grandson Royal	원손	元孫	Wŏnson	아기씨 자가	— 自家	Agissi; Chaga	None	Eldest son of a crown prince, usually by his wife, before being appointed as heir to the throne
Grand Heir	왕세손	王世孫	Wangseson	각하 자가	閤下 自家	Kakha; Chaga	None	Son of a crown prince who has been appointed as heir to the throne
Grand Heiress Consort	왕세손빈	王世孫嬪	Wangsesonbin	자가	自家	Chaga	None	Wife of a grand heir
Grand Prince	왕자 대군	王子 大君	Wangja; Taegun	아기씨 자가 대감	— 自家 大監	Agissi; Chaga; Taegam	None	Son of a king by his wife
Grand Princess Consort	부부인	府夫人	Pubuin	마님	—	Manim	Senior 1 (정1품)	Wife of a grand prince
Prince	왕자 군	王子 君	Wangja; Kun	아기씨 자가 대감	— 自家 大監	Agissi; Chaga; Taegam	None	Son of a king by a concubine
Princess Consort	군부인	郡夫人	Kunbuin	마님	—	Manim	Senior 1 (정1품)	Wife of a royal prince
Prince	군	君	Kun	—			Junior 1 (종1품)	Eldest son of a grand prince
Princess Consort	군부인	郡夫人	Kunbuin	—			Junior 1 (종1품)	Wife of a grand prince's eldest son
Prince	군	君	Kun	—			Senior 2 (정2품)	Other sons of a crown prince, eldest grandson of a grand prince, eldest son of a royal prince
Princess Consort	현부인	賢夫人	Hyŏnbuin	—			Senior 2 (정2품)	Wife of a prince of the senior second rank
Prince	군	君	Kun	—			Junior 2 (종2품)	Grandsons of a crown prince, other sons and eldest great-grandson of a grand prince, eldest grandson of a royal prince
Princess Consort	현부인	賢夫人	Hyŏnbuin	—			Junior 2 (종2품)	Wife of a prince of the junior second rank
—	정	正	Chŏng	—			Senior 3 (정3품)	Great-grandsons of a crown prince, other grandsons of a grand prince, other sons and eldest great-grandson of a royal prince
—	도정	都正	Tojŏng	—			Senior 3 (정3품)	Great-grandsons of a crown prince, other grandsons of a grand prince, other sons and eldest great-grandson of a royal prince
Cautious Lady	신인	慎人	Sinin	—			Senior 3 (정3품)	Wife of a chŏng and tojŏng
—	부정	副正	Pujŏng	—			Junior 3 (종3품)	Great-grandsons of a grand prince, other grandsons of a royal prince
Cautious Lady	신인	慎人	Sinin	—			Junior 3 (종3품)	Wife of a pujŏng
—	수	守	Su	—			Senior 4 (정4품)	Great-grandsons of a royal prince, sons of a grand prince by a commoner
Benovelent Lady	혜인	惠人	Hyein	—			Senior 4 (정4품)	Wife of a su
—	부수	副守	Pusu	—			Junior 4 (종4품)	Sons of a grand prince by a lowborn, sons of a royal prince by a commoner
Benovelent Lady	혜인	惠人	Hyein	—			Junior 4 (종4품)	Wife of a pusu
—	영	令	Yŏng	—			Senior 5 (정5품)	Sons of a royal prince by a lowborn
Lady	온인	溫人	Onin	Wife of a yŏng			Senior 5 (정5품)	
Monarch's female descendants and their consorts
Royal Princess	왕녀 공주	王女 公主	Wangnyŏ; Kongju	아기씨 자가	— 自家	Agissi; Chaga	None	Daughter of a king by his wife
Prince Consort	의빈	儀賓	Ŭibin	부마	駙馬	Puma	Junior 1 (종1품)	Husband of a royal princess
Princess	왕녀 옹주	王女 翁主	Wangnyŏ; Ongju	아기씨 자가	— 自家	Agissi; Chaga	None	Daughter of a king by a concubine
Prince Consort	승빈	承賓	Sŭngbin	부마	駙馬	Puma	Junior 2 (종2품)	Husband of a princess
Commandery Princess	군주	郡主	Kunju	아기씨 자가	— 自家	Agissi; Chaga	Senior 2 (정2품)	Daughter of a crown prince by his wife
Prince Consort	부빈	副賓	Pubin	부마	駙馬	Puma	Senior 3 (정3품)	Husband of a commandery princess
County Princess	현주	縣主	Hyŏnju	아기씨 자가	— 自家	Agissi; Chaga	Senior 3 (정3품)	Daughter of a crown prince by a concubine
Prince Consort	첨빈	僉賓	Ch'ŏmbin	부마	駙馬	Puma	Junior 3 (종3품)	Husband of a county princess

=== Concubines ===
Each royal consort in the inner palace (후궁; 後宮; hugung) had a certain rank, according to which their titles and forms of address were formulated.

English	Hangul	Hanja	McCune–Reischauer	Rank
Monarch
Concubine	빈 (Note: Various honorific titles would be prefixed, such as Hŭi (희), Suk (숙), Kyŏng (경), Ch'ang (창), Sŏn (선), etc.)	嬪	Pin	senior 1 (정1품)
Noble Lady	귀인	貴人	Kwiin	junior 1 (종1품)
Lady of Bright Deportment	소의	昭儀	Soŭi	senior 2 (정2품)
Lady of Warm Deportment	숙의	淑儀	Sugŭi	junior 2 (종2품)
Lady of Bright Countenance	소용	昭容	Soyong	senior 3 (정3품)
Lady of Warm Countenance	숙용	淑容	Sugyong	junior 3 (종3품)
Lady of Bright Beauty	소원	昭媛	Sowŏn	senior 4 (정4품)
Lady of Warm Beauty	숙원	淑媛	Sugwŏn	junior 4 (종4품)
Crown prince
Lady of Excellence	양제	良娣	Yangje	junior 2 (종2품)
Lady of Filial Excellence	양원	良媛	Yangwŏn	junior 3 (종3품)
Lady of Inherent Glory	승휘	承徽	Sŭnghwi	junior 4 (종4품)
Lady of Clear Instruction	소훈	昭訓	Sohun	junior 5 (종5품)

== Royal court ==
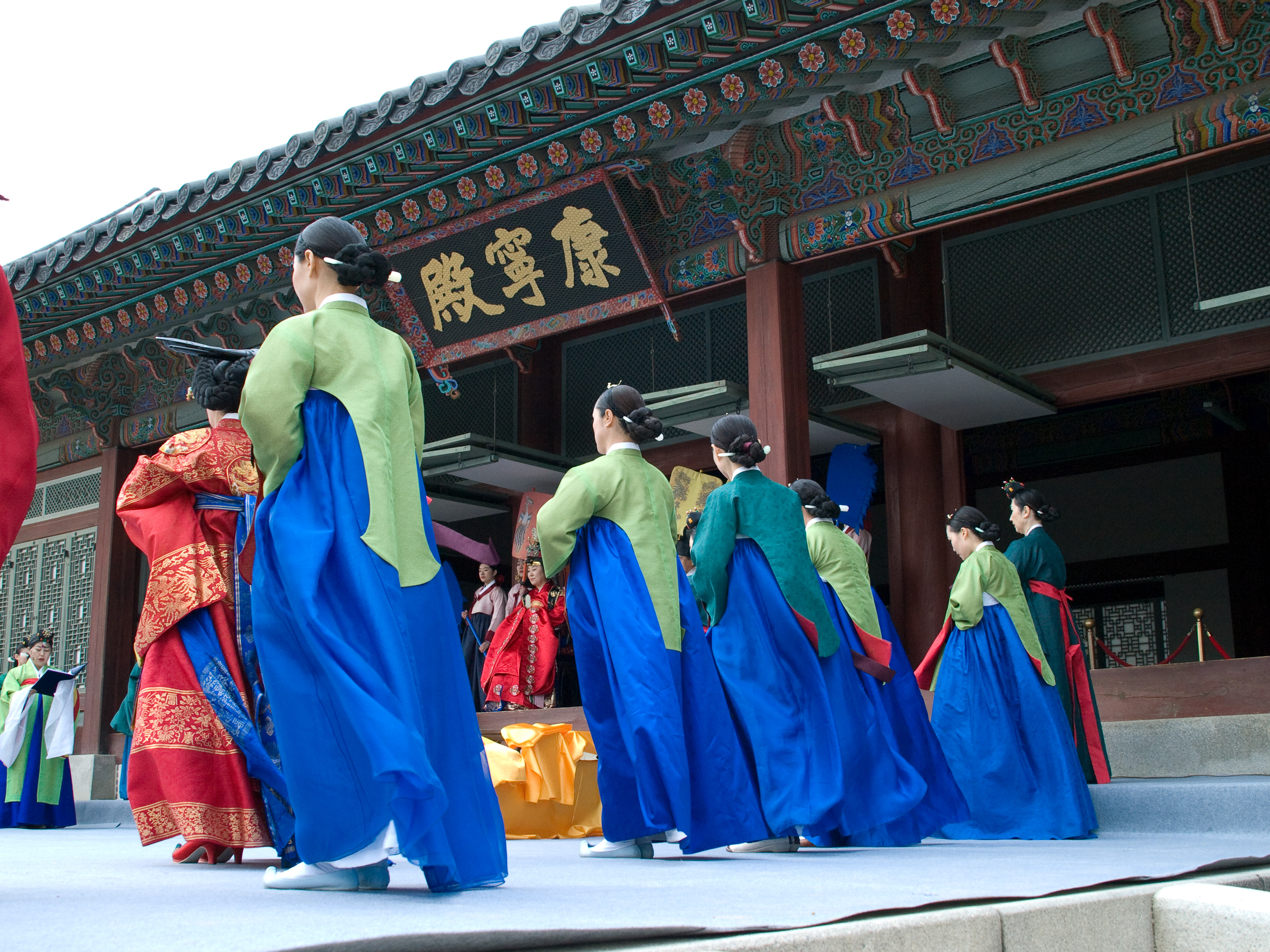
Kungnyŏ

Hangul	Hanja	McCune–Reischauer	Rank
Female officials (궁녀; kungnyŏ)
상궁	尙宮	Sanggung	senior 5 (정5품)
상의	尙儀	Sangŭi	senior 5 (정5품)
상복	尙服	Sangbok	junior 5 (종5품)
상식	尙食	Sangsik	junior 5 (종5품)
상침	尙寢	Sangch'im	senior 6 (정6품)
상공	尙功	Sanggong	senior 6 (정6품)
상정	尙正	Sangjŏng	junior 6 (종6품)
상기	尙記	Sanggi	junior 6 (종6품)
전빈	典賓	Chŏnbin	senior 7 (정7품)
전의	典衣	Chŏnŭi	senior 7 (정7품)
전선	典膳	Chŏnsŏn	senior 7 (정7품)
전설	典設	Chŏnsŏl	junior 7 (종7품)
전제	典製	Chŏnje	junior 7 (종7품)
전언	典言	Chŏnŏn	junior 7 (종7품)
전찬	典贊	Chŏnch'an	senior 8 (정8품)
전식	典飾	Chŏnsik	senior 8 (정8품)
전약	典藥	Chŏnyak	senior 8 (정8품)
전등	典燈	Chŏndŭng	junior 8 (종8품)
전채	典彩	Chŏnch'ae	junior 8 (종8품)
전정	典正	Chŏnjŏng	junior 8 (종8품)
주궁	奏宮	Chugung	senior 9 (정9품)
주상	奏商	Chusang	senior 9 (정9품)
주각	奏角	Chugak	senior 9 (정9품)
주변징	奏變徵	Chubyŏnjing	junior 9 (종9품)
주징	主徵	Chujing	junior 9 (종9품)
주우	奏羽	Chuu	junior 9 (종9품)
주변궁	奏變宮	Chubyŏn'gung	junior 9 (종9품)
Eunuchs (내시; naesi)
상선	尙膳	Sangsŏn	junior 2 (종2품)
상온	尙醞	Sangon	senior 3 (정3품)
상다	尙茶	Sangda	senior 3 (정3품)
상약	尙藥	Sangyak	junior 3 (종3품)
상전	尙傳	Sangjŏn	senior 4 (정4품)
상책	尙冊	Sangch'aek	junior 4 (종4품)
상호	尙弧	Sangho	senior 5 (정5품)
상탕	尙帑	Sangt'ang	junior 5 (종5품)
상세	尙洗	Sangse	senior 6 (정6품)
상촉	尙燭	Sangch'ok	junior 6 (종6품)
상훼	尙煊	Sanghwe	senior 7 (정7품)
상설	尙設	Sangsŏl	junior 7 (종7품)
상제	尙除	Sangje	senior 8 (정8품)
상문	尙門	Sangmun	junior 8 (종8품)
상경	尙更	Sanggyŏng	senior 9 (정9품)
상원	尙苑	Sangwŏn	junior 9 (종9품)

== Officials ==
English	Hangul	Hanja	McCune–Reischauer	Rank	Explanation
Oemyŏngbu (외명부)
Honorable and Respectful Madame	정경부인	貞敬夫人	Chŏnggyŏngbuin	1st (1품)	Wife of a senior and junior 1st rank official
Honorable Madame	정부인	貞夫人	Chŏngbuin	2nd (2품)	Wife of a senior and junior 2nd rank official
Virtuous Madame	숙부인	淑夫人	Sukpuin	3rd (3품)	Wife of a senior 3rd rank official
Virtuous Lady	숙인	淑人	Sugin	3rd (3품)	Wife of a junior 3rd rank official
Clever Lady	영인	伶人	Yŏngin	4th (4품)	Wife of a senior and junior 4th rank official
Courteous Lady	공인	恭人	Kongin	5th (5품)	Wife of a senior and junior 5th rank official
Proper Lady	의인	宜人	Ŭiin	6th (6품)	Wife of a senior and junior 6th rank official
Peaceful Lady	안인	安人	Anin	7th (7품)	Wife of a senior and junior 7th rank official
Regular Lady	단인	端人	Tanin	8th (8품)	Wife of a senior and junior 8th rank official
Junior Lady	유인	孺人	Yuin	9th (9품)	Wife of a senior and junior 9th rank official

== See also ==
- Naehun
