= Jungjong Restoration =

1506 successful coup in Joseon

Jungjong Restoration 중종반정 中宗反正
Date	September 2, 1506
Location	Hanyang, Joseon (now Seoul, South Korea)
Result	Successful Coup: King Yeonsan deposed and exiled to Ganghwa Island.; Grand Prince Jinseong assumes the throne as King Jungjong.; Jang Nok-su and other officials sympathetic to the King are executed.; Reopening the Seonggyungwan, royal university, and the Office of Censors.

Belligerents
Joseon Insurgents led by Pak Wŏnjong and Sŏng Hŭian	Joseon Government

Commanders and leaders
Pak Wŏnjong; Sŏng Hŭian; Yu Sunjŏng; Hong Kyŏngju	King Yeonsan; Jang Nok-su (executed); Im Sa-hong †; Yu Chagwang (defected)

In 1506, the 12th year of Yeonsangun, a group of officials – notably Pak Wŏnjong, Sŏng Hŭian, Yu Sunjŏng and Hong Kyŏngju plotted against the despotic ruler. They launched a coup on September 2, 1506, deposing the king and replacing him with his half-brother, Grand Prince Jinseong. The king was demoted to prince, and exiled to Ganghwa Island, where he died a few weeks later. Consort Jang Nok-su, who was regarded as a femme fatale who had encouraged Yeonsangun's misrule, was beheaded. Yeonsangun's young sons were also killed.

== See also ==
- Korean literati purges
- Hungu (Korean political faction)
