= Yi Siae's Rebellion =

1467 rebellion in Korea

Date	May—August 1467
Location	Hamgil Province
Result	Government Victory: Rebellion suppressed

Belligerents
Joseon Army	Yi Siae's Rebel Army

Commanders and leaders
Sejo of Joseon; Prince Gwiseong; Cho Sŏngmun; Hŏ Chong; Kang Sun; Kim Kyo; Ŏ Yuso; Nam I	Yi Siae (executed); Yi Sihap (executed); Yi Myŏnghyo (executed)

Strength
May: 30,000 July: 50,000	May: 30,000 July: 10,000

Casualties and losses
- Unknown military casualties. Twenty thousand surrendered and defected to the government army. Destruction of the rebel army and execution of their leaders.

- Yi Siae's Rebellion
- Hangul: 이시애의 난
- Hanja: 李施愛ㅡ亂
- RR: I Siaeui nan
- MR: I Siaeŭi nan

Yi Siae's Rebellion was an armed rebellion in 1467 in Hamgil Province (later renamed Hamgyong Province) led by General Yi Siae, a member of Yangban landowners in Kilju, Hamgil Province, to rebel against the centralized policy of King Sejo.

== Background ==
Hamgil Province was the home province of King Yi Sŏnggye, the founder of the Joseon Dynasty. Taejo established this area as his base of power, subjugating the Jurchen tribes and increasing his strength. During Sejong's era, the river area expanded up to the Tuman River, and the people of Samnam-ni, Gangwon moved to make Hamgildo a province. However, in a situation where they always had to face off against the Jurchen raids, it was necessary to make enormous human and material sacrifices to defend Hamgildo, which put a tremendous burden on the people of Hamgildo. After the founding of the Joseon Dynasty, to effectively rule and protect Hamgildo and give preference to the birthplace of the royal family, the local nobles were appointed as local officials and led from generation to generation.

However, after King Sejo came to power, he strengthened the centralization policy to gradually reduce the number of officials from the north and dispatched officials from the south to govern the province. Sejo also passed the Hopae System to regulate the movement of Joseon's subjects further. The nobles in the northern regions feared that they would lose control of the commoners, causing dissatisfaction among the northerners. Yu Chagwang, who participated in the subjugation army at the time of Yi Siae's rebellion, understood that the reason the rebellion spread was that the officials dispatched to Hamgil-do were inexperienced with the region and abused the people. Moreover, officials sent from the central government harassed the people with projects such as fortifications. As a result of regional discrimination against Hamgil residents, the people protested against appointed officials from abroad and local councils (Hyangcheong, Korean: 향청; Hanja: 鄕廳) in Hamgil unified their forces against the central government.

== Prelude ==
Yi Siae first served as Heungjin's military commander in 1458, deputy commander in 1461, and magistrate of Hoeryong City in 1463. Initially, since the province had some exceptional circumstances of geographical proximity to Jurchens from the north, the court-appointed local officials from among the well-known nobles to rule the region from generation to generation. However, Sejo strengthened the centralized system and reduced northern officials, which made Yi feel uneasy about his position.

Yi Siae, his younger brother Yi Sihap and son-in-law Yi Myŏnghyo took advantage of the opportunity on leave for Hamgil Province due to his mother's death and rallied disgruntled nobles and residents of the northern provinces to organize and agitate the public while retiring from office. He stirred public sentiment by spreading rumors that soldiers from Pyeongan and Hwanghae would also cross Seolhanryeong Pass and enter Hamgil.

"Soldiers from Hasamdo (下三道) are advancing to Hamgildo by land. Soldiers from Chungcheong Province arrived on a boat to Gyeongseong and Hurado (厚羅島) and were anchored. The court sent soldiers from Pyeongan Province and Hwanghae Province to enter North Island from Hanyang (薛罕嶺, 雪寒嶺) and to kill all the people of Bondo Island in the future.”

— Yi Siae

However, the officials and nobles criticized the rumors by Yi Siae as nonsense so that they would not be deceived and sympathize with the rebellion.

On May 10, 1467, he attacked and killed Kang Hyomun, the Hamgil-do provincial army commander (byeongmajeoldosa,兵馬節度使). At the same time, he killed Magestrate Sŏl Chŏngsin of Kilju, Judge Pak Sundal of Kilju County, and Kim Iksu of Puryong County, which helped Yi Siae win the support of the people of the northern provinces, starting the rebellion.

== Rebellion ==
Yi Siae established his base in his home, Kilju County, and then led his rebel army with the Iksok Force (Iksokgun, Korean: 익속군; Hanja: 守城軍) as the vanguard to attack Bukcheong, and Hongwon counties, and Dancheon, Hamhung cities and murdered all the local officials dispatched from the central government, such as provincial governor Sin Myŏn, and captured Yoon Ja-un claiming he received the King's command to execute them for treason. At that time, Hamgildo's people supported Yi Siae's rebellion, and when Yi Siae delivered a forged document to Hamhung saying that Sin Myŏn was the son of Yeonguijeong Sin Sukchu, who caused a rebellion, that he should be executed. At the same time, he sent his people to deliver Kang to General Han Myŏnghoe and falsely told him it was the will of King Sejo to have Kang Hyomun executed for conspiring with high officials such as Sin Sukchu to commit treason. On the other hand, Yi Siae gathered power by propagating to the people of Hamgil that his rebellion was the cause of the execution of Kang Hyomun and others according to the will of King Sejo. In the early days of the rebellion, the people believed Yi's rumors and persuasion that Kang was a loyalist and that the army that came to subdue him was rather a traitor. He even requested to become governor of Hamgildo. Upon hearing the news, King Sejo, knowing that the court officials were not involved, detained them in the palace.

Yi Siae also set up a liaison with the central government, saying, "The military commander Kang Hyomun and others conspired with Han Myŏnghoe and Sin Sukchu of Hanseong-bu and led Hamgil-do's army to Seoul and attempted to rebel. I want you to become the leader." Sejo was deceived by Yi and imprisoned Han Myŏnghoe and Sin Sukchu for a time. When he heard the news that Sin Myŏn and Kang Hyomun were executed, he made Prince Gwiseong commander of the subjugation army of 30,000 with Provincial Commander Yi Jun of Guseong City, Deputy Commander Cho Sŏngmun, and Generals Kang Sun, Hŏ Chong, Kim Kyo, Ŏ Yuso, and Nam I to suppress the rebellion.

=== Early Actions ===
On May 15, 1467, the rebel forces expanded their influence to Hamgil and Pyeongan Province. The Yi Jun advanced to Chorwon County, and Prince Gwiseong arrived in Guseong City. Still, he barely moved to Hoeyang County because the rebels were too strong, especially the Iksok Force, which numbered 4,500, with 900 of them armed with chongtong as they had years of experience fending off Jurchen raids. King Sejo, in response, dispatched more reinforcements to the Subjugation Army and made the provincial governor Kang Sun as general-in-chief of the Northwestern Frontier District and gave him command of 3,000 troops from Pyeongan to Yeongheung County and Muncheon City. Sejo gave Commander Pak Chungsŏn authority of over 1,000 from Hwanghae to Mucheon County and General Ŏ Yuso control of over 1,000 police officers from the Capital City of Hanseong to help the army in Guseong County. Sejo also supplied the military with several gunpowder weapons.

"I hereby send you three mortars (碗口), 250 chongtong, five hwachas, 400 hwa-jeon (火箭, gunpowder launched arrows), 27 geun (斤) of gunpowder (16 kg), 1,000 gakgung (角弓, a type of bow), and 5,000 bowstrings ..."

— A passage from the records for June 20 of the 13th year of King Sejo (1467) in The Veritable Records of the Joseon Dynasty

The troops of Prince Gwiseong repulsed Yi Siae's forces in Anbyeon and advanced to Hoeyang through the Cheollyeong Pass. Meanwhile, King Sejo sent down various filial piety statements (Hyoyumun, Korean: 효유문; Hanja: 曉諭文), setting the condition that would pardon the rebels if they surrendered even now. Still, the rebels killed the messenger who carried the notice. At the same time, he offered a bounty to those who arrested rebel leaders.

On June 1, Yi Siae left for Magok City with 200~500 soldiers, while Yi Sihap traveled to Hat'an Village in Hongwon County, but the Gapsa for Prince Gwiseong, Cha Un-hyuk captured him, but he managed to escape and regroup with the rebels. At that time, the insurgents rendezvoused in Hamhung while the government forces marched to Yeongheung County. Inspector Yun Chaun escaped from Yi Siae's camp in Guseong County to regroup with the army, crossing Chaeryong County and entered Anbyeon in Kangwon County, and told Hŏ Chong to enter Yeongheung, and encircle the rebels. Hŏ Chong engaged Yi Siae and repulsed him from the County, establishing a bridgehead for the government army. King Sejo ended the filial piety policy, freeing high-ranking officials such as Sin Sukchu, and at the same time devised hard-line measures against the rebels. Bewildered by King Sejo's strict standards, Yi Siae retreated from Hamheung and moved its headquarters to Dabo Village in Bukcheong to use it as a base. With Yi Siae's retreat, the government forces of Guseong County occupied Hamhung on June 19, advanced to Hongwon, and took command of the entire army to build new barracks from Sinwon County to Hamgwanryeong Pass to the west. Kang Sun made Guseong County the spearhead of the attack on Bukcheong and had him build a camp at Yangryeong, Sangaeryeong, and Jonggaeryeong Passes. Accordingly, Kang Sun, along with Pak Chungsŏn, Hŏ Chong, and Ŏ Yuso, crossed Jonggaeryeong Pass and encamped in front of Bukcheong.

=== Siege of Bukcheong ===
==== First Battle ====
On June 19, Yi Siae evacuated Bukcheong and split his army. While Yi Siae advanced north of Dancheon, recruiting various rebel groups and Jurchens, Yi Sihap stationed about 20,000 soldiers in Yeoju-eul Village, near Bukcheong. He dispatched a group of 500 female rebels to attack the government forces from Gosaripo Village in Iseong County to Bukcheong Fortress. Kang Sun and his forces entered Bukcheong Fortress, unaware that Yi Siae's army was not there, and Yi Sihap's rebels surrounded them. At the end of the day, as suggested by Kim Kyo, Kang Sun installed palisades around the castle on the flat ground while building a trench inside the castle and dug a tunnel outside the castle to prepare for an enemy attack. On June 24, from 2 to 4 am, Yi Siae attacked but was stopped by Kang Sun's emplacements. As the day dawned, Yi Siae's army began to lose morale. Yi Siae sent a northern official to parlay with Kang Sun and demanded their surrender. But Kang Sun reprimanded him, "If you are a soldier, go to the palace and surrender yourself." Yi Siae attacked Bukcheong ten times but could not break his defenses.

==== Second Battle ====
On July 14, Yi Siae ordered his son-in-law, Yi Myŏnghyo, to gather the rebels from Hongwon, Bukcheong, Gapsan, and Samsu Counties and cross Tangguryeong Pass into Sinpyong County and Hamheung county. Government forces blocked routes and supply lines to Bukcheong, forcing the rebels north to cross Manryeong, east of Bukcheong, and reorganizing his army in two rebel camps. He waited for the government forces at Bukcheong to collapse. Meanwhile, the government forces retreated from Bukcheong to Hongwon, dividing the army into three military camps. Yi Siae took advantage of this opportunity to occupy Bukcheong and prepare for a long-term battle. In the meantime, the government officials tried to parlay conditions for Yi Si- ae's surrender, but Yi Siae refused and ended up going into a long-term battle.

On July 25, General Kang Sun secretly marched in the middle of the night, crossing the Sangaeryeong Pass, while General Ŏ Yuso snuck through Jonggaeryeong Pass into Bukcheong, and they attacked from both sides. Then at the same time, Prince Gwiseong and his army left Guseong County and proceeded to Pyeongpo County. Using a pincer movement, they defeated the rebel armies at Sangaeryeong Pass. The government forces rushed into Bukcheong and defeated the rebel army led by a rebel official and swordsman Yu Tŭkchi (유득지; 劉得之). They absorbed their armies and increased their government forces to about 50,000. Upon hearing the news of their defeat, Yi Siae led the remaining 10,000 soldiers to Manryeong.

=== Battle of Manryeong Pass ===
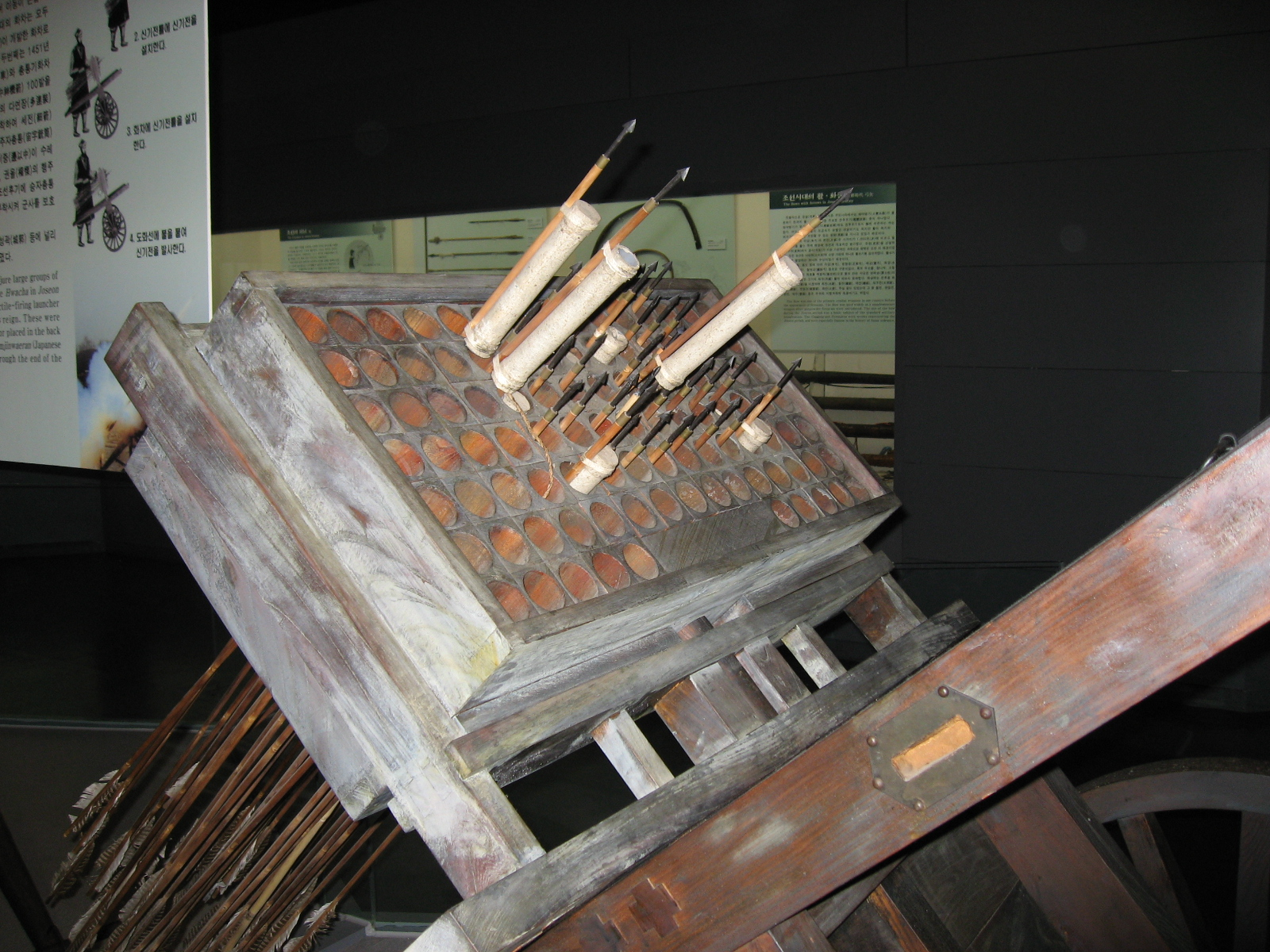
Hwacha launch pad, ignitors placed in the narrow section of each arrow to fire.

Manryeong Pass at Riwon County faces the sea to the south and Mt. Taesan to the north, making it a strategic location for Yi Siae to battle government forces.

On July 31, Kang Sun's army arrived at Manryong first, then Ŏ Yuso's army, and then Prince Gwiseong's Army. First, the soldiers led by Prince Gwiseong, Kang Sun, Pak Chungsŏn, Lt. General U Kong (우공; 禹貢), Hŏ Chong, and others moved to the middle peak on the south side of the main road. Ŏ Yuso was to the seashore and Dongryeong Pass, and Kim Kyo and others went under Mt. Buksan and surrounded and advanced from four sides toward Manryeong to attack Yi Siae simultaneously, exchanging fire with their gunpowder weapons and arrows. Yi Siae, with ties with the Jurchens, requested reinforcements. Still, the government forces defeated the rebels at Hongwon and Bukcheong counties, cutting them off.

At 3-5pm, U Kong charged the rebels and occupied the main peak of Manryeong forcing the rebels with 5,000 remaining to retreat to the middle peak. Yi Siae ordered about 2,000 Shield Corps (Paengbaedae, Korean: 팽배대; Hanja: 彭排隊) in three lines. At the same time, around 5-7 pm, Ŏ Yuso ordered the bombardment of the middle peak using hwachas penetrating the left flank of Yi Siae's army. He dispatched U Kong to lead his camouflaged amphibious commandos to infiltrate a hole in the corner of the rear defensive line allowing the government forces to defeat the rebels and forcing Yi Siae to retreat at night.

=== Suppression ===
The next day, August 1, the government forces pursued the Yi Siae troops fleeing north to Iseong County, burning guesthouses and warehouses along the way. On August 8, Prince Gwiseong and the government forces crossed Maunryeong and advanced to Yeongjewon, while Yi Siae encamped in Dancheon and attempted resistance across Namdaecheon but retreated to Kilju.

On August 12, the government forces pursued Yi Siae, recaptured Dancheon, and crossed Macheonryong to Yeongdong. Yi Siae retreated to Kyongsong County to gather soldiers and Jurchens allies. When Yi Siae's nephew, Heo Yu-rye, hears that his father, Heo Seung-do, has been forcibly taken away by Yi Siae as part of Hŏ Chong's plan to defeat him. He rendezvoused with him in secret and persuaded Yi Siae's subordinates, Yi Chu, Yi Unno, and Hwang Saeng, to betray Yi Siae. They arrested Yi Siae and Yi Sihap and handed them and the rebel leaders over to Nam I's subjugation forces.

== Aftermath ==
Nam I's subjugation forces annihilated the rebel army, and the captured rebels were beheaded and killed by Jun Seong-gun in front of the subjugation army. Yi Siae was executed by a thousand cuts which ended the four-month rebellion, and the military carried his head to Hanseong. As the revolution subsided, it resulted in accelerating the reign of King Sejo. Due to the Yi Siae's Rebellion, Kilju was demoted to Gilseong County, and Hamgil-do was divided into two provinces, North Hamgyong and South Hamgyong, and abolished their local councils. King Sejo promoted Yi Jun, Nam I, Cho Sŏngmun, Ŏ Yuso, Hŏ Chong, Heo Yu-rye, and Yi Suk-gi and enumerated many other officials such as Kim Seo-Hyung.

== Significance ==
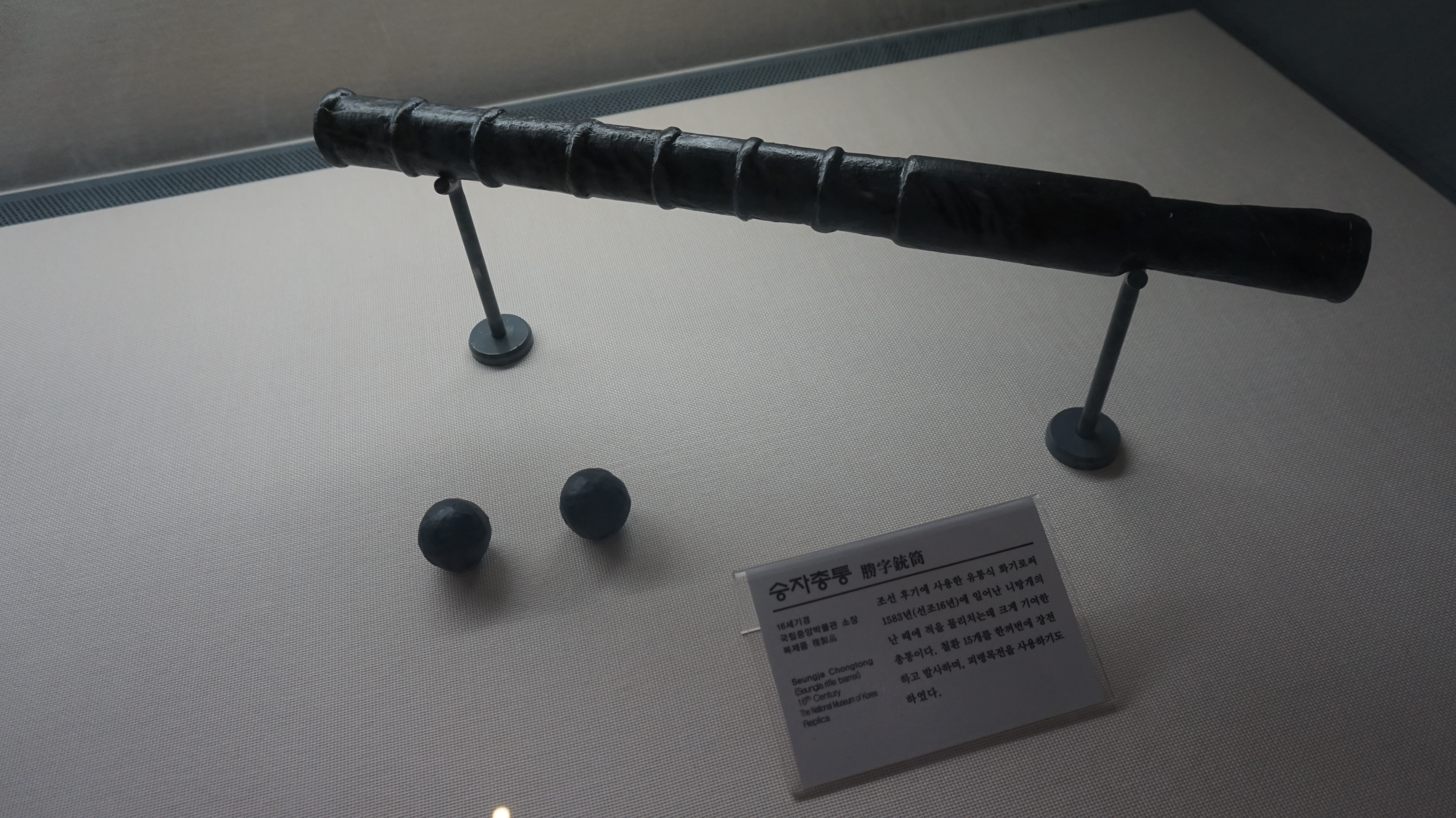
Seungja-chongtong, the standard hand cannon used by both sides of the rebellion.

Yi Siae protested against the regime of King Sejo but was unsuccessful. He united the local people's dissatisfaction with Sejo's establishment of a powerful system of government.

The Battle of Manryeong was the turning point in the rebellion where both sides engaged in the first massive fire combat in the Joseon Dynasty. Many different kinds of (gunpowder) weapons, including the shield walls for defending against chongtong, chongtong to destroy the shield walls, and hwacha for significant damage, could be seen in the battles during Yi Siae's Rebellion.

== See also ==
- King Sejo
