= Yi Siae =

Korean rebel leader (fl. 15th century)

- Hangul: 이시애
- Hanja: 李施愛
- RR: I Siae
- MR: I Siae

Yi Siae (Korean: 이시애; Hanja: 李施愛, ? – August 12, 1467) was a Korean Joseon Dynasty politician and soldier who led a rebellion against King Sejo for his centralization policy in the northern provinces.

== Background ==
Yi Siae was from a local noble family from Kilju. His clan lived in several towns in Hamgil Province (later renamed as Hamgyong Province). He first served as Heungjin's military commander in 1458, deputy commander in 1461, and magistrate of Hoeryong city in 1463. In the early Joseon Dynasty, the royal court used the province as a policy of conciliation with the Jurchens. Hamgil Province was the home province of King Taejo of Joseon, the founder of the Joseon Dynasty. Taejo established this area as his base of power, subjugating the Jurchen tribes and increasing his strength. During Sejong's era, the river area expanded up to the Tuman River, and the people of Samnam-ni, Gangwon moved to make Hamgil Province a province. However, in a situation where they always had to face off against the Jurchen raids, it was necessary to make enormous human and material sacrifices to defend Hamgildo, which put a tremendous burden on the people of Hamgil province. After the founding of the Joseon Dynasty, to effectively rule and protect Hamgil province and give preference to the birthplace of the royal family, the local nobles were appointed as the local officials.

However, after King Sejo came to power, he strengthened the centralization policy to gradually reduce the number of officials from the north and dispatched officials from the south to govern the province, which made Yi and the northerners feel uneasy about his rule. Sejo also passed the Hopae System to regulate the movement of Joseon's subjects further. The nobles in the northern regions feared that they would lose control of the commoners, causing dissatisfaction among the northerners. Moreover, officials sent from the central government harassed the people with projects such as fortifications.

As a result of regional discrimination against Hamgyong residents, the people protested against appointed officials from abroad and local councils (향청; 鄕廳; Hyangcheong) in Hamgyong unified their forces against the central government with Yi Siae and his family leading them. In response, Yi Siae led 30,000 rebels, including the Iksok Force of 4,500, as his vanguard to occupy several areas north of Hamheung, including Dancheon, Hongwon, and Bukcheong counties. Yi Siae executed several officials from the central government, such as Kang Hyomun. They held the military power in the northeast at the time and an army officer under his command. They killed the villagers and slaughtered the officials of each province, causing a rebellion.

Upon hearing the report of the rebellion, the royal court made Prince Gwiseong commander of the subjugation army of 30,000 with Provincial Commander Yi Chun of Guseong, Deputy Commander Cho Sŏngmun, and Generals Kang Soon, Hŏ Chong, Kim Kyo, Ŏ Yuso, and Nam I to suppress the rebellion. They won the battles in Bukcheong and Manryeong and forced Yi Siae to retreat to Kilju. Yi Siae's nephew, Heo Yu-rye, and his father, Hŏ Sŭngdo, persuaded Yi Siae's subordinates, Yi Chu, Yi Unno, and Hwang Saeng, to betray Yi Siae. They arrested Yi Siae and Yi Sihap and handed them and the rebel leaders over to Nam I's subjugation forces. Yi Siae was captured and executed by executed by a thousand cuts which ended the four-month rebellion, and the army carried his head to Hanseong.

== See also ==
- Yi Siae's Rebellion
