= Consort Jang =

Consort Jang may refer to:

- Jang Nok-su (died 1506), concubine of Yeonsangun of Joseon
- Queen Inseon (1619–1674), wife of Hyojong of Joseon
- Jang Ok-jeong (1659–1701), consort of Sukjong of Joseon
