= Chang Yŏnu =

Goryeo bureaucrat (fl. 11th century)

- Hangul: 장연우
- Hanja: 張延祐
- RR: Jang Yeonu
- MR: Chang Yŏnu

Posthumous name
- Hangul: 안경
- Hanja: 安敬
- RR: Angyeong
- MR: An'gyŏng

Chang Yŏnu (Korean: 장연우; Hanja: 張延祐; ? – January 5, 1016) was a Korean civil official who served the Goryeo dynasty. He fought in the second conflict in the Goryeo–Khitan War.

== Biography ==
Chang Yŏnu was the son of Chang Yu (장유; 張儒), of the Heungdeok Chang clan. Chang Yu worked in the Department of Visiting Guests (객성; 客省; kaeksŏng), during the reign of King Gwangjong. Chang Yŏnu is thought to have been born around the time of the reign of Gwangjong.

In 1010, Chang Yŏnu was serving as the deputy minister of War (병부시랑; 兵部侍郞; pyŏngbu sirang) when he was appointed as the haengyŏng tot'ongbusa (행영도통부사; 行營都統副使) of the 300 thousand strong Goryeo army led by Kang Cho sent to defend against the invading Khitans. The Goryeo army was defeated near Tongju by the Khitans, with Kang being captured and later killed. Chang survived the battle and fled southwards with King Hyeonjong to Naju in 1011. He was appointed as the superintendent of the Censorate (판어사대사; 判御史臺事; p'anŏsadaesa) for his service to the king.

In 1014, due to a lack of government funds, Chang and Hwangbo Yu-ŭi, both civil officials, proposed to reduce the salary of the military officials to make up for the lack of funds. This decision angered the military officials, with Supreme Generals Ch'oe Chil and Kim Hun launching a military rebellion and seizing control of the government. Both Chang and Hwangbo were exiled from the court. However, in 1015, both Ch'oe and Kim were killed and power was restored to the civilian court. Chang and Hwangbo were allowed to return. Chang was appointed as the Minister of Revenue (호부상서; 戶部尙書; hobu sangsŏ), but died shortly later on January 5, 1016 (Note: In the lunar calendar, he died in the 23th day of the 11th month of 1015.). He was posthumously honoured as the Vice Director of the Right in the Department of State Affairs (상서우복야; 尙書右僕射; sangsŏubogya) and given the posthumous name of An'gyŏng. Chang's poem, "Song of Cold Pine Pavilion" (한송정곡; 寒松亭曲), would later be included in the Joseon-era collection of writings called Tongmunsŏn (Selections of Refined Literature of Korea).
