= Im Sahong =

Joseon scholar-official (1445–1506)

- Hangul: 임사홍
- Hanja: 任士洪
- RR: Im Sahong
- MR: Im Sahong

Courtesy name
- Hangul: 이의
- Hanja: 而毅
- RR: Iui
- MR: Iŭi

Im Sahong (Korean: 임사홍; Hanja: 任士洪; 1445–1506) was a Korean scholar official and member by marriage of the royal family of Joseon. He was a close minister of the tyrannical Yeonsangun. His courtesy name was Iŭi (이의) and he came from the Pungcheon Im clan.

== Family ==
- Father: Im Wŏnjun (임원준; 1423 – 1500 or 1506)
- Mother: Lady, of the Uiryeong Nam clan (의령 남씨)
- Sibling(s)
  - Brother: Im Sayŏng (임사영; ?–1507)
- Wife: Lady, of the Jeonju Yi clan (전주 이씨; 1450–?) (Note: Daughter of Prince Boseong (보성군; 1416–1499) and granddaughter of Grand Prince Hyoryeong.)
- Issue
  - Son: Im Kwangjae (임광재; 1470–1495)
  - Son: Im Hŭijae (임희재; 1472–1504)
  - Son: Im Sungjae (임숭재; 1479–1505)
  - Son: Im Munjae (임문재; 1479–?)
  - Daughter: Lady Im (임씨; 1480–?)

== In popular culture ==
- Portrayed by Shin Chung-sik in the 1984–1985 MBC TV series Snow Matchmaker.
- Portrayed by Ahn Byeong-gyeong in the 1994 KBS2 TV series Han Myung Hoi.
- Portrayed by Lee Yeong-hu in the 1995 KBS2 TV series Jang Nok Soo.
- Portrayed by Im Hyeok in the 1998–2000 KBS1 TV series The King and the Queen.
- Portrayed by Im Byeong-gi in the 2007–2008 SBS TV series The King and I.
- Portrayed by Park Seung-ho in the 2011–2012 JTBC TV series Queen Insu.
- Portrayed by Cheon Ho-jin in the 2015 film The Treacherous.
- Portrayed by Kang Shin-il in the 2017 KBS2 TV series Queen for Seven Days.

== See also ==
- Jungjong Restoration
- Korean literati purges
