= Yu Sunjŏng =

Korean scholar-official (1459–1513)

- 유순정
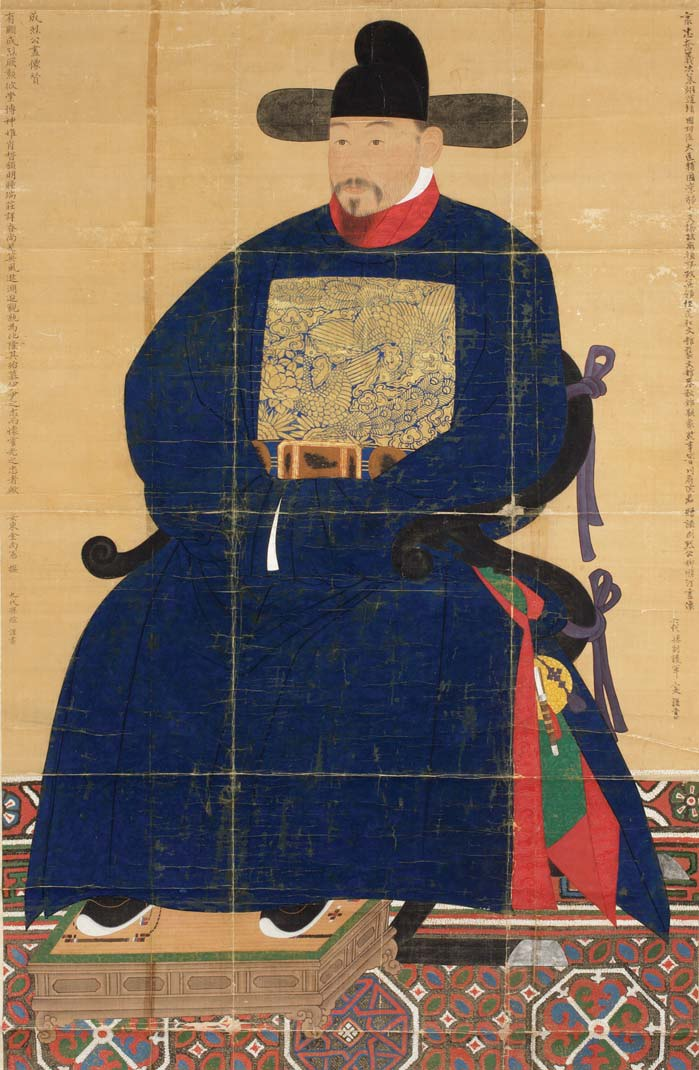

Chief State Councillor
- In office November 14, 1512 – January 26, 1513
- Preceded by: Kim Su-dong
- Succeeded by: Sŏng Hŭian

Left State Councillor
- In office November 9, 1509 – November 14, 1512
- Preceded by: Pak Wŏnjong
- Succeeded by: Sŏng Hŭian

Right State Councillor
- In office 26 October 1506 – 9 November 1509
- Preceded by: Pak Wŏnjong
- Succeeded by: Sŏng Hŭian

Personal details
- Born: 1459
- Died: January 26, 1513 (aged 53–54)

Korean name
- Hangul: 유순정; 류순정 (Note: The hanja character 柳 can be read as both Yu (유) or Ryu (류).)
- Hanja: 柳順汀
- RR: Yu Sunjeong; Ryu Sunjeong
- MR: Yu Sunjŏng; Ryu Sunjŏng

Yu Sunjŏng (Korean: 유순정; Hanja: 柳順汀; 1459 – January 26, 1513), also known as Ryu Sunjŏng (Korean: 류순정), was a Korean scholar-official during the Joseon period. A disciple of Kim Chong-jik, he was one of three principal leaders (alongside Pak Wŏnjong and Sŏng Hŭian) of the Jungjong coup of 1506 together with other Neo-Confucianism philosophers and scholars and became Chief State Councillor of Joseon in 1512. He was a part of the Sarim faction and hailed from the Jinju Yu clan.

== Family ==
- Father
  - Yu Yang (유양; 柳壤)
- Mother
  - Lady Chŏng; daughter of Chŏng Chip (정집)
- Spouse
  - Lady Kwŏn
- Issue
  - Son - Yu Hong (유홍; 柳泓)
  - Son - Yu Cha (유자; 柳滋)
- Concubine and issue
  - Lady Ch'oe; granddaughter of Ch'oe Mi-dong (최미동; 崔彌同)
    - Son - Yu Yŏn (유연; 柳漣)
    - Son - Yu Wi (유위; 柳湋)
    - Son - Yu Hang (유항; 柳沆)
    - Son - Yu Pyŏn (유변; 柳汴)

== Popular culture ==
- He was portrayed by Yoo Hyung-gwan in the 2017 KBS2 TV series Queen for Seven Days.
