= Heungdeok Jang clan =

Korean clan from North Jeolla Province

Heungdeok Jang clan Heungseong Jang clan
- Country: Korea
- Current region: Heungdeok-myeon, Gochang County, North Jeolla Province, South Korea
- Founder: Chang Yu
- Connected members: Chang Yon-u; Chang Dae-whan

The Heungdeok Jang clan, also known as the Heungseong Jang clan, (Note: Surname also spelt as Chang) is a Korean clan, with the bon-gwan (ancestral seat) based in Heungdeok-myeon, Gochang County, South Korea.

== Background ==
In the 2015 South Korean census, 37,423 individuals identified themselves as part of the Heungdeok Jang clan, and 21,973 individuals identified themselves as members of the Heungseong Jang clan, with a combined total of 59,396 members. The progenitor of the clan is considered to be Chang Yu (장유; 張儒) (Note: Jang Yu in Revised Romanization). He was from Sangjil-hyeon (modern-day Heungdeok).

Chang Yu would rise the position of gwangpyeong sirang. His son, Chang Yŏn-u, would serve the Goryeo government from the reign of King Seongjong to King Hyeonjong. He served as deputy minister of war and fought the Khitans at Tongju.

== Members ==
- Chang Yŏn-u, Goryeo government official
- Chang Nok-su, Consort of King Yeonsangun of Joseon
- Chang Chi-ryang, 9th Chief of Staff of the Air Force
- Chang Dae-whan, South Korean businessman, son of Chang Chi-ryang
