= Cha Ji-yeon =

South Korean actress (born 1982)

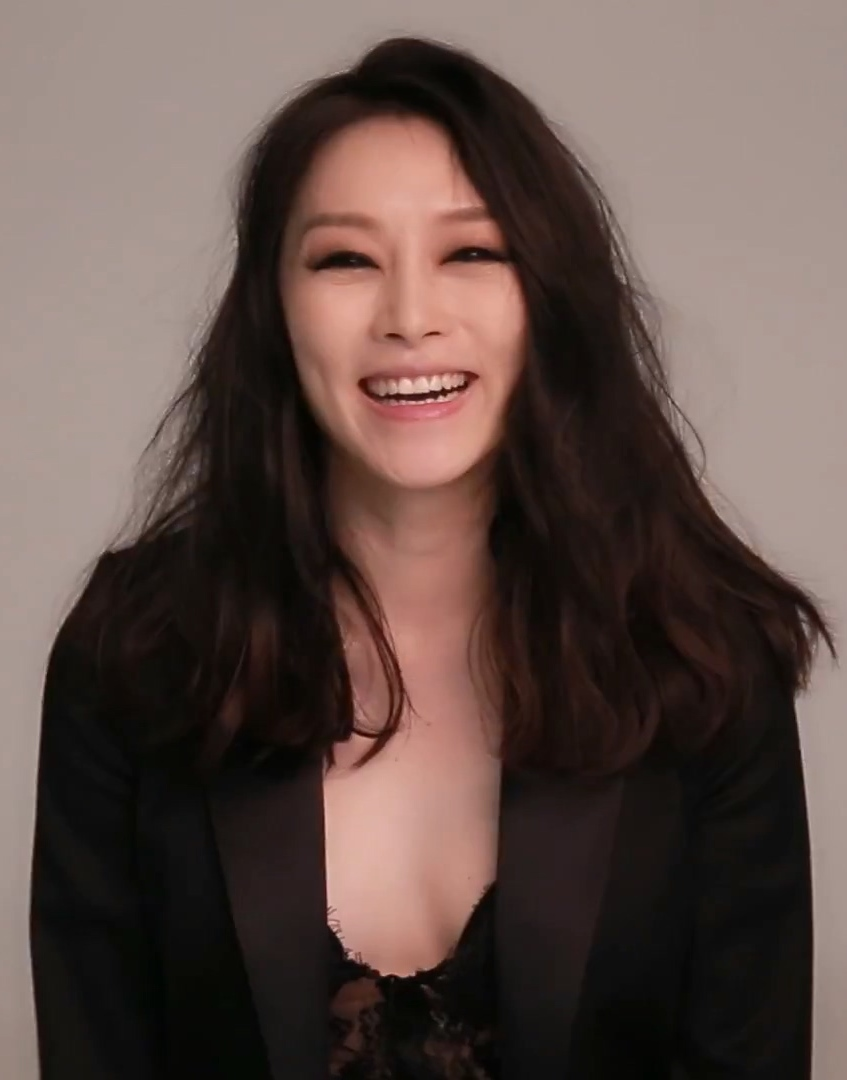
- Cha in 2018
- Born: 22 February 1982 (age 44); Daejeon, South Korea
- Occupation: Actress
- Years active: 2006–present
- Agent: CLN Company
- Spouse: Yoon Tae-on (m. 2015)
- Children: 1

Cha Ji-yeon is a South Korean actress and singer. She is known for her roles in dramas such as Scent of a Woman, Taxi Driver and Remarriage & Desires. She also appeared in movies The Treacherous, Love, Lies, Horror Stories 3 and Lost Face.

== Personal life ==
She married actor and singer Yoon Tae-on in 2015 and together have one child.

== Filmography ==
=== Film ===
Year	Title	Role	Ref.
2011	The Treacherous	Jang Nok-su	
2016	Love, Lies	Lee Nan-young	
2016	Horror Stories 3	Android	
2021	Lost Face	Empress Myeongseong	

=== Television series ===
Key
†	Denotes television productions that have not yet been released

Year	Title	Role	Notes	Ref.
2011	Scent of a Woman	Veronica		
2021–2023	Taxi Driver	Baek Sung-mi	Season 1–2	
2022	Remarriage & Desires	Choi Yoo-sun		
2026	Final Table	Baek Hyeon-ju		

== Theater ==
Year	English title	Korean title	Role	Ref.
2023	Amadeus	아마데우스	Salieri	
2025	The Last Empress	명성황후	Empress Myeongseong	

== Ambassadorship ==
- 6th The Musical Awards Ambassador in 2012

== Awards and nominations ==
Name of the award ceremony, year presented, category, nominee of the award, and the result of the nomination
Award ceremony	Year	Category	Nominee / Work	Result	Ref.
16th Korea Musical Awards	2010	Best New Actress	Seopyeonje	Won	
5th The Musical Awards	2011	Best Actress	Seopyeonje	Won	
1st Seoul Musical Festival Yegreen Awards	2012	Best Actress in Acting Arts	Seopyeonje	Won	
6th Yegreen Musical Awards	2017	Best Actress	Mata Hari	Won	
6th Asia Artist Awards	2021	Scene Stealer Award	Gwanghwamun Sonata	Won	
SBS Drama Awards	2021	Best Supporting Actress in a Miniseries Genre/Fantasy Drama	Taxi Driver	Won	
APAN Star Awards	2022	Best Supporting Actress	Taxi Driver	Nominated	
6th Korea Musical Awards	2022	Best Actress Award	Red Book	Won	
