= The Treacherous =

- Theatrical release poster
- Hangul: 간신
- Hanja: 姦臣
- RR: Gansin
- MR: Kansin
- Directed by: Min Kyu-dong
- Written by: Lee Yoon-seong; Min Kyu-dong
- Produced by: Min Jin-su
- Starring: Ju Ji-hoon; Kim Kang-woo; Chun Ho-jin; Lim Ji-yeon; Lee Yoo-young; Cha Ji-yeon
- Cinematography: Park Hong-yeol
- Edited by: Kim Sun-min
- Music by: Kim Jun-seong
- Production company: Soo Film
- Distributed by: Lotte Entertainment
- Release date: May 21, 2015
- Running time: 132 minutes
- Country: South Korea
- Language: Korean
- Budget: ₩7 billion
- Box office: US$8 million

The Treacherous (Korean: 간신; RR: Gansin; lit. 'Treacherous Subject') is a 2015 South Korean period drama film about Joseon's king Yeonsan, directed by Min Kyu-dong. It follows Im Sung-jae, a notorious vassal who, alongside his father Im Sa-hong, manipulated King Yeonsangun of Joseon. The film was theatrically released on May 21, 2015.

== Plot ==
In the 11th year of King Yeonsangun's reign, as schemers vie for power by offering women to control the king, the age of treacherous courtiers begins. Appointed as Chae Hong-sa, Im Sung-jae forcibly recruits beautiful women from across Joseon, calling them Unpyeong, seizing the opportunity to execute his grand ambition for ultimate power. His ruthless actions, indiscriminately abducting noblewomen, commoners, and even the lower class, ignite public outrage.

Im Sung-jae and his father, Im Sa-hong, select the Dan-hee for personal training, while the infamous courtesan Jang Nok-su, fearing her loss of influence, enlists Joseon's gisaeng, Seol Jung-mae, to counter Dan-hee. As treacherous courtiers engage in a fierce battle for dominance, Dan-hee and Seol Jung-mae must endure rigorous training to become the ultimate gi-saeng and survive in a ruthless game of power and seduction.

== Cast ==
- Ju Ji-hoon as Im Sung-jae
  - Seo Young-joo as young Im Sung-jae
- Kim Kang-woo as Yeonsangun of Joseon
- Chun Ho-jin as Im Sa-hong
- Lim Ji-yeon as Dan-hee
  - Kim Hyun-soo as young Dan-hee
- Lee Yoo-young as Seol Jung-mae
- Cha Ji-yeon as Jang Nok-su
- Song Young-chang as Yu Ja-gwang
- Jo Han-chul as Park Won-jong
- Jang Gwang as Joseon prime minister
- Jung In-gi as Head of Sungkyunkwan
- Gi Ju-bong as Butcher Mr. Kim
- Ryu Seon-young as wife of the head of Sungkyunkwan
- Seo Ji-seung as daughter of the Prime Minister
- Kim Jong-gu as Nobleman Jo
- Son Young-hee as Sweet Briar, gisaeng from Miryang
- Choi Ye-yoon as So-hyang, Yonggonggak gisaeng
- Kim Ji-young as Mother of Deposed Queen Lady Yun
- Park Myung-shin as Queen's mother
- Moon Hee-kyung as Discipline sanggung
- Kim Seon-ha as only daughter of nobleman Jo
- Ko Kyung-pyo as Grand Prince Jinseong
- Jung Man-sik as Assassin
- Shim Eun-jin as Yonggonggak owner
- Choi Il-hwa as Kim Il-son
- Jeon Yeo-been as Woman having queen's fate by Physiognomy

== Reception ==
=== Box office ===
The film has grossed ₩8.92 billion (US$8.09 million) from 1.11 million admissions at the South Korean box office.

=== Awards and nominations ===
Year	Award	Category	Recipient	Result
2015	52nd Grand Bell Awards	Best Art Direction	Lee Tae-hun	Nominated
2015	52nd Grand Bell Awards	Best Costume Design	Lee Jin-hee	Nominated
2015	36th Blue Dragon Film Awards	Best New Actress	Lee Yoo-young	Won
2015	36th Blue Dragon Film Awards	Best Art Direction	Lee Tae-hun	Nominated
