= Pak Wŏnjong =

Korean politician and soldier (1467–1510)

Pak Wŏnjong 박원종

Chief State Councillor
- In office 9 November 1509 – 13 April 1510
- Preceded by: Yu Sun
- Succeeded by: Kim Sudong

Left State Councillor
- In office 26 October 1506 – 9 November 1509
- Preceded by: Kim Sudong
- Succeeded by: Yu Sunjŏng

Right State Councillor
- In office 29 September 1506 – 26 October 1506
- Preceded by: Kim Sudong
- Succeeded by: Yu Sunjŏng

Personal details
- Born: 1467
- Died: 1510 (aged 42–43)

Korean name
- Hangul: 박원종
- Hanja: 朴元宗
- RR: Bak Wonjong
- MR: Pak Wŏnjong

Courtesy name
- Hangul: 백윤
- Hanja: 伯胤
- RR: Baekyun
- MR: Paegyun

Pak Wŏnjong (Korean: 박원종; Hanja: 朴元宗; 1467 – June 3, 1510 (Note: In Korean Lunar calendar, Pak died on April 17, 1510)) was a Korean politician and soldier during the Joseon period, who served as Chief State Councillor from 1506 to 1510. He was a major leader of the Jungjong coup who had brought King Jungjong to the throne. His courtesy name was Paegyun (백윤; 伯胤). He was the uncle of Yun Im and Queen Janggyeong, the wife of King Jungjong of Joseon. He was the foster father of Royal Noble Consort Gyeong of Miryang Pak clan (경빈 박씨), a concubine of King Jungjong.

== Family ==
- Father
  - Pak Chungsŏn (박중선; 朴仲善; 1435–1481)
- Mother
  - Lady Hŏ of the Yangcheon Hŏ clan (양천 허씨; 1430–?)
- Siblings
  - Older sister: Lady Pak of the Suncheon Pak clan (순천 박씨; 順天 朴氏; 1445–?)
  - Older sister: Lady Pak of the Suncheon Pak clan (순천 박씨; 順天 朴氏; 1450–1500)
  - Older sister: Grand Internal Princess Consort Seungpyeong of the Suncheon Pak clan (승평부대부인 박씨; 昇平府大夫人 朴氏; 10 March 1455 – 20 July 1506)
    - Brother-in-law: Grand Prince Wolsan (월산대군; 5 January 1454 – 22 January 1488)
  - Older sister: Lady Pak of the Suncheon Pak clan (순천 박씨; 順天 朴氏; 1459–?)
  - Younger sister: Lady Pak of the Suncheon Pak clan (순천 박씨; 順天 朴氏; 1469–?)
  - Younger sister - Internal Princess Consort of the Suncheon Pak clan (순천부부인 순천 박씨; 順天 朴氏; 1470–1498)
  - Younger sister: Pak Suksŏn (박숙선; 朴叔善), Princess Consort Seungpyeong of the Suncheon Park clan (승평부부인 순천 박씨; 昇平府夫人 順天朴氏; 1472–?)
- Wives and their respective issue(s)
  - Lady Yun of the Papyeong Yun clan (파평 윤씨; 1477–?); daughter of Yun Rin (윤린; 1449–1540)
  - Lady Sŏng of the Changnyeong Sŏng clan (창녕 성씨; 昌寧 成氏; 1475–?); daughter of Sŏng Chun (성준)
    - Son: Pak Un (박운; 朴雲; 1490–?)

== Popular culture ==
=== Drama ===
- Portrayed by Jo Gyeong-hwan in the 1985 MBC TV series 500 Years of Joseon: The Wind Orchid.
- Portrayed by Lee Dong-jun in the 1995 MBC TV series Jang Noksu.
- Portrayed by Kim Byeong-gi in the 1996 KBS TV series Jo Gwang-jo.
- Portrayed by Cha Gwang-su in the 1998–2000 KBS TV series The King and Queen.
- Portrayed by Kim Yeong-in in the 2001–2002 SBS TV series Ladies of the Palace.
- Portrayed by Lee Chang-hwan in the 2003–2004 MBC TV series Dae Jang Geum.
- Portrayed by Cha Ki-hwan in the 2007–2008 SBS TV series The King and I.
- Portrayed by Park Su-il in the 2011–2012 JTBC TV series Insu, The Queen Mother.
- Portrayed by Choi Dae-chul in the 2017 MBC TV series The Rebel.
- Portrayed by Park Won-sang in the 2017 KBS2 TV series Queen for Seven Days.

=== Film ===
- Portrayed by Kim Jin-gyu in the 1962 film Tryant Yeonsan.
- Portrayed by Jo Han-chul in the 2015 film The Treacherous.

== See also ==
- Jungjong coup
- Sŏng Hŭian
- Yu Sunjŏng
