= Song Young-chang =

South Korean actor (born 1958)

- 송영창
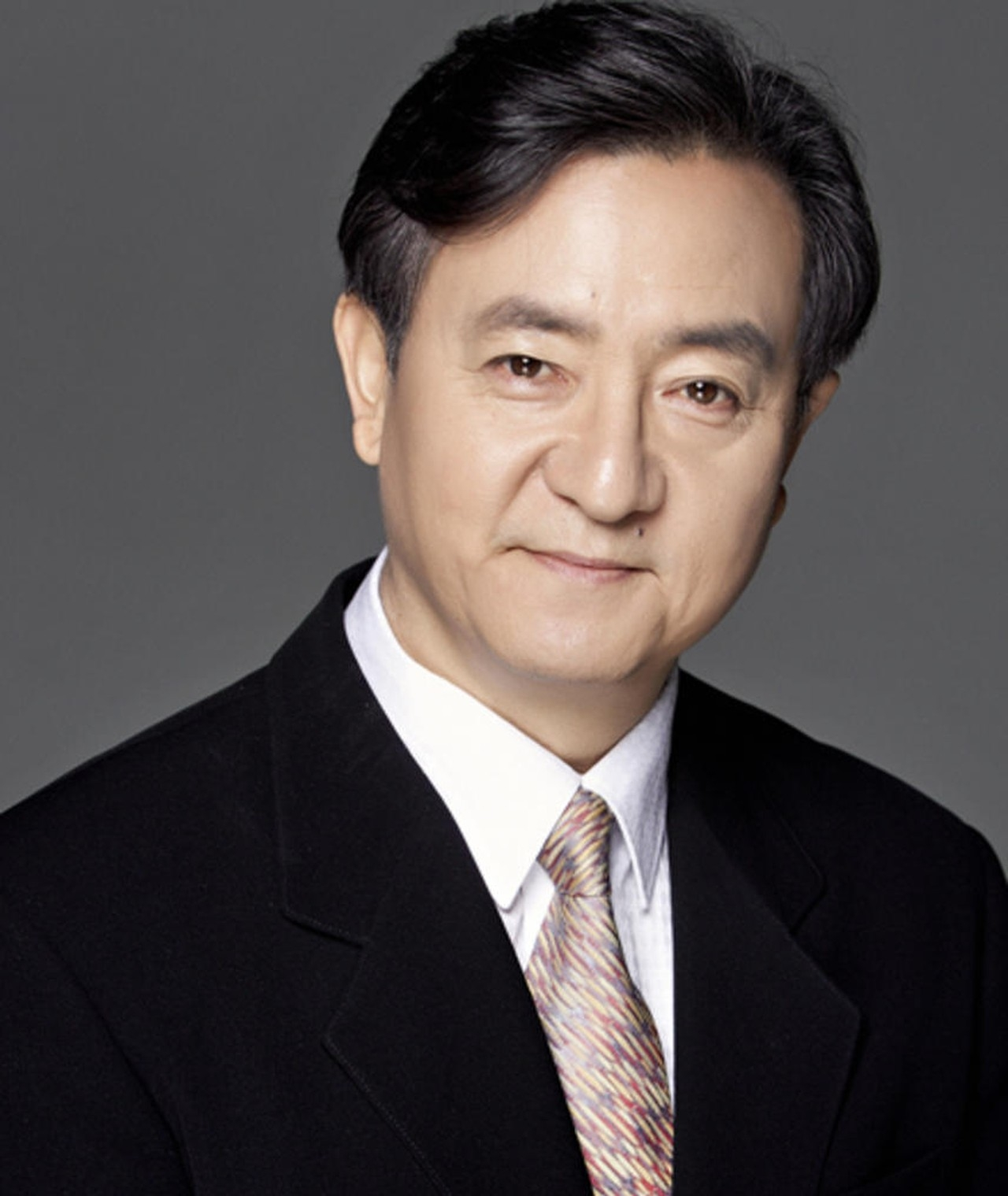
- Song in 2026
- Born: 2 April 1958 (age 68); Gyeongsangnam-do, Jinju-si, South Korea
- Education: Chung-Ang University (MA)
- Occupations: Actor; voice actor; broadcaster
- Years active: 1977–present
- Awards: 1987 Baeksang Arts Awards Newcomer Award; 1989 Seoul Theater Festival Newcomer Award; 2008 Drama Festival 2 Actor Award

Song Young-chang (Korean: 송영창, born 2 April 1958) is a South Korean actor, voice actor and broadcaster. He is best known for his role as Player 100, Im Jeong-dae (임정대), in the television series Squid Game.

On September 27, 2000, Song was arrested after allegedly paying a minor to have sex with him. He served a 10-month prison sentence and a 2-year probation period for statutory rape.

== Career ==
Song was born on 2 April 1958 in Jinju, Gyeongsangnam-do, South Korea. He graduated from the Department of Theater and Film at the Chung-Ang University, earning a master's degree.

In 1977, he made his debut as a stage actor. The following year, in 1978, he joined the Dong-A Broadcasting System as a voice actor. In 1980, he transferred to the Korean Broadcasting System (KBS) as a voice actor. In 1982, he transferred again to the Munhwa Broadcasting Corporation (MBS) as a voice actor. In August 2000, he made his final appearances on KBS, MBC, SBS, and EBS, concluding his career with these last performances.

On September 27, 2000, Song was arrested on charges of underage sex trafficking and statutory rape. He allegedly paid a 17-year-old girl, whom he met through a voicemail advertisement, a total of 350,000 won to have sex with him on two separate occasions. Song was cleared of the sex trafficking charge in 2002, but he served 10 months in prison and 2 years in probation for statutory rape.

Following his arrest, he was banned from appearing on KBS, MBC, SBS, and EBS broadcasts, and could no longer appear on these networks.

In September 2017, despite the ban, he made his first appearance on another broadcaster, marking his return after a full 17 years.

In 2024 and 2025, he took the role of Player 100, Im Jeong-dae or the "Mr. One More Game" (임정대 또는 원 모어 게임 씨), in the second and third seasons of Squid Game.

== Acting activities ==
=== Broadcasts ===
- 1993: KBS Night Show
- 1994: KBS Documentary Theater
- 1994: MBC Intellectual Game College Student TV Debate

=== Dramas ===
- 1989: KBS daily drama Senoya
- 1989: KBS 6ᆞ25 special drama There is no Tragedy – Kang Wook
- 1991: KBS miniseries Burning Like a Candle – Moon Byeong-guk, a second-generation Korean
- 1992: KBS historical drama Three Kingdoms – Kim Chun-chu
- 1992: MBC Thursday drama The City People – Song Cha-jang
- 1992: KBS weekend drama For Love – Reporter Jeong Do-yeop
- 1992: MBC 8.15 special drama Chunwon Lee Kwang-soo
- 1992: SBS Monday-Tuesday drama 비련초
- 1993: MBC political drama The Third Republic – Kim Seok-soon
- 1993: KBS historical drama 먼동
- 1993: SBS Drama Special Dear Others – Lee Eung-doo
- 1994: MBC Best Theater From Heaven to Hell – A couple in their 30s
- 1994: SBS Monday-Tuesday drama 영웅일기 – Yoo Ji-hyung
- 1995: MBC Wednesday-Thursday special drama The 4th Republic
- 1995: KBS daily drama Sky Watching – Jin
- 1995: KBS miniseries Making a Man – Tae-wan
- 1995: MBC Best Theater Special Temptation
- 1996: KBS morning drama When a Woman Loves – Jae-min
- 1998: SBS drama special The Matchmaker
- 1998: KBS daily drama My Love by My Side – Kim Moon-soo
- 1998: SBS morning drama Embrace – Choi Ji-hoon
- 1999: KBS daily drama People's House
- 2000: KBS historical drama Taejo Wang Geon – Cheorwon Seongju (special appearance)
- 2000: SBS drama special Fireworks – Park Ji-tae
- 2000: SBS Monday-Tuesday drama The Thief's Daughter – Detective Joo
- 2017: OCN weekend drama Bad Guys 2 – Bae Sang-do
- 2018: tvN short drama Drama Stage – The Woman Who Makes the Last Meal
- 2019: tvN Saturday-Sunday drama Confession – Oh Taek-jin
- 2019: OCN weekend drama The Lies Within – Hong Min-guk
- 2021: OCN weekend drama Times – Baek Gyu-min
- 2021: tvN Wednesday-Thursday drama Hometown – Yang Won-taek
- 2021: JTBC Wednesday-Thursday drama Artificial City – Jeong Pil-seong
- 2022: JTBC Sat-Sun drama Cleaning Up – Song Woo-chang
- 2022: JTBC Sat-Sun drama The Good Detective – Cheon Seong-dae
- 2022: JTBC Sat-Sun drama The Empire – Han Geon-do
- 2022: Disney+ original series Shadow Detective – Ahn Hyung-woo
- 2023: JTBC Sat-Sun drama Agency – Kang Yong-ho
- 2023: Channel A Monday-Tuesday drama Queen of Masks – Kang Il-goo
- 2023: JTBC Sat-Sun drama Doctor Cha Jung-sook – Oh Chang-gyu
- 2023: ENA Sat-Sun drama Evilive – Moon Sang-guk
- 2024: tvN Mon-Tue drama Parole Examiner Lee – Ji Dong-man
- 2024: Netflix Squid Game Season 2 – Im Jeong-dae
- 2025: JTBC Sat-Sun drama Good Boy – Oh Bong-chan
- 2025: Netflix Squid Game season 3 – Im Jeong-dae

=== Film ===
- 1990: My Love, My Bride – Manager Im (Guest appearance)
- 1991: Echoes of Love and Death – Kang Wook
- 1992: Stairway to Heaven – Lee Kyung-sik
- 1993: First Love – Kang Jeong-ok
- 1994: 49 Days Man – Political Affairs
- 1995: Men Are Troubled
- 1998: Amazing Men – Bad Guy 2 (Special Appearance)
- 1998: An Affair – Jun-il
- 1999: Nowhere to Hide – Drug Dealer (Comeback)
- 1999: Beijing Spot – Small Business President (Comeback)
- 1999: Morning, Morning (Short Story)
- 2000: The King of Fouls – Deputy Branch Manager
- 2005: Duelist – Minister Song Pil-joon
- 2007: Voice of a Murderer – Captain Noh
- 2007: M – President Jang
- 2008: Butterfly Mole – Detective (Special Appearance)
- 2008: Eye for an Eye – Kim Hyun-tae
- 2008: The Good, the Bad, the Weird – Kim Pan-joo
- 2008: Once Upon a Time in Seoul – Man-gi
- 2009: Thirst – Seung-dae
- 2009: The Case of Itaewon Homicide – Chief Prosecutor
- 2009: Closer to Heaven – Qigong Therapist (Guest appearance)
- 2009: Jeon Woo-chi: The Taoist Wizard – Jung
- 2010: Blades of Blood – Han Shin-gyun
- 2010: The Man from Nowhere – President Oh Myung-gyu
- 2010: The Quiz Show Scandal – Do Ho-man
- 2011: Moby Dick – Priest (Special appearance)
- 2011: Heat – President Jang
- 2012: Nameless Gangster: Rules of the Time – Lawyer Han
- 2012: Doomsday Book – Chairman Kang
- 2012: Deranged – Director Kim
- 2012: Perfect Number – Polygraph examiner
- 2012: The Devil's Temptation (Short film)
- 2013: Montage – Han Chul
- 2013: Tough as Iron– Hwan-gyu
- 2013: The Attorney – Judge Lee Seok-ju
- 2014: The Fatal Encounter – General Gu Seon-bok
- 2014: Kundo: Age of the Rampant – Jo Dae-gam
- 2014: Man on High Heels – Heo Bul
- 2015: Love Forecast – Chief
- 2015: Shoot Me in the Heart – Director Lecter
- 2015: The Deal – Judge (special appearance)
- 2015: The Treacherous – Yu Chagwang
- 2015: The Classified File – Eun-joo's father
- 2015: Veteran – Chairman Cho
- 2016: Pandora – New Headquarters Manager
- 2017: The King – Lee Hak-cheol
- 2017: Bluebeard – Kyung-hwan Cho / In-soo Nam
- 2017: Namhansanseong – Kim Ryu
- 2017: The Bros – Dang-sook
- 2018: Herstory – Mayor of Busan Station
- 2018: Default – Noh Shin-sa
- 2018: Drug King – UN Ambassador
- 2018: Father's Task
- 2019: Mal-Mo-E: The Secret Mission – Ryu Wan-taek
- 2019: Jo Pil-ho: The Dawning Rage – Jeong Yi-hyang
- 2020: Honest Candidate – Lee Woon-hak
- 2020: Deliver Us From Evil – Chun-seong
- 2020: Swindler – Pastor Jang
- 2020: Collectors – Sang-gil
- 2021: In the Name of the Son
- 2022: Hunt – Chief Kang
- 2022: Remember – Jeong Baek-jin
- 2023: 1947 Boston – President Hong

=== Theater ===
- 1986: Cinders
- 1986: Silbimyeong
- 1986: Ode to Death
- 1986: Psyche, Your Mirror
- 1986: Goto Waiting
- 1991: Roller Skating Tumbler
- 2010: With You
- 2011: University of Laughter

=== Musical ===
- 1990: Ode to Death/Psyche Your Mirror
- 1991: Are You Still Dreaming
- 1993: Roller Skating Tumbler
- 1994: Waiting for Godot
- 1997: Kholstomer
- 1999: 42nd Street
- 2006: Evita
- 2008: The Sound Thief
- 2011: Spring Awakening
- 2011: Lovers in Paris
- 2013: C'mon Here Quietly
- 2013: The Moon Embracing the Sun
- 2013: Late Night Restaurant

== Other Appearances ==
=== CFs ===
- 1992 Samsung Everland Buckingham
- 1992 Samsung Everland Home Delivery Service (co-starred with Yang Mi-kyung)
- 1994 LG Electronics Art Vision
- 1995 Korea Fuji Xerox

== Awards ==
- 2008 Drama Festival 2 Actor Award
- 1989 Seoul Theater Festival Newcomer Award
- 1987 Baeksang Arts Awards Newcomer Award
