= Sŏng Hŭian =

Korean politician (1461–1513)

Sŏng Hŭian 성희안

Chief State Councillor
- In office 6 May 1513 – 27 August 1513
- Preceded by: Yu Sunjŏng
- Succeeded by: Song Chil

Left State Councillor
- In office 14 November 1512 – 6 May 1513
- Preceded by: Yu Sunjŏng
- Succeeded by: Song Chil

Right State Councillor
- In office 9 November 1509 – 14 November 1512
- Preceded by: Yu Sunjŏng
- Succeeded by: Song Chil

Personal details
- Born: January 1461
- Died: 1513 (aged 51–52)

Sŏng Hŭian (Korean: 성희안; Hanja: 成希顔; January 1461 – July 1513) was a Korean Joseon politician and Neo-Confucianism philosopher who served as Chief State Councillor during the reign of King Jungjong in 1513 until his death. He was one of the merit subjects that led the coup that placed King Jungjong on the throne.

== Family ==
- Father
  - Sŏng Ch'an (성찬; 成瓚)
- Mother
  - Lady Yi of the Jeonju Yi clan (전주 이씨)
- Sibling(s)
  - Older brother - Sŏng Hŭi-jeung (성희증; 成希曾)
  - Older sister - Lady Sŏng of the Changnyeong Sŏng clan (창녕 성씨; 昌寧 成氏)
  - Older sister - Lady Sŏng of the Changnyeong Sŏng clan (창녕 성씨; 昌寧 成氏)
  - Older sister - Lady Sŏng of the Changnyeong Sŏng clan (창녕 성씨; 昌寧 成氏)
  - Older sister - Lady Sŏng of the Changnyeong Sŏng clan (창녕 성씨; 昌寧 成氏)
- Spouse
  - Lady Cho of the Pungyang Cho clan (풍양 조씨)
- Issue
  - Son - Sŏng Yul (성율; 成瑮; 1498–?)
    - Daughter-in-law - Lady Yi of the Jeonju Yi clan (전주 이씨)
      - Grandson - Sŏng Su-ch'ŏl (성수철; 成壽鐵; 1512–?)
      - Granddaughter - Sŏng Myŏng-ik (성명억; 成命億), Lady Sŏng of the Changnyeong Sŏng clan (창녕 성씨; 昌寧 成氏; 1515–?)
      - Granddaughter - Sŏng Ch'ŏn-ŏk (성천억; 成薦億), Lady Sŏng of the Changnyeong Sŏng clan (창녕 성씨; 昌寧 成氏; 1519–?)
      - Granddaughter - Sŏng Ka-si (성가시; 成加屎), Lady Sŏng of the Changnyeong Sŏng clan (창녕 성씨; 昌寧 成氏; 1530–?)
  - Daughter - Lady Sŏng of the Changnyeong Seong clan (창녕 성씨; 昌寧 成氏)
    - Son-in-law - Kwŏn Yŏng (권영; 權詠) of the Andong Kwŏn clan
      - Grandson - Kwŏn Ho (권호; 權顥)
      - Grandson - Kwŏn I (권이; 權頤; 1541–?)
  - Daughter - Lady Sŏng of the Changnyeong Sŏng clan (창녕 성씨; 昌寧 成氏)
    - Son-in-law - Yi Hŭi-myŏng (이희명; 李希明) of the Pyeongchang Yi clan
      - Grandson - Yi Sŏp (이섭; 李渉; 1534–?)
      - Grandson - Yi Pal (이발; 李潑)
      - Granddaughter - Lady Yi of the Pyeongchang Yi clan (평창 이씨)
      - Grandson - Yi Ok (이옥; 李沃; 1537–?)
      - Grandson - Yi Ch'ŏl (이철; 李澈; 1538–?)

== Popular culture ==
- Portrayed by Lee Hwa-ryong in the 2017 KBS2 TV series Queen for Seven Days.

== See also ==
- Jungjong coup
- Pak Wŏnjong
- Yu Sunjŏng
