= Queen for Seven Days =

2017 South Korean television series

- Promotional poster
- Hangul: 7일의 왕비
- Hanja: 7日의 王妃
- RR: 7irui wangbi
- MR: 7irŭi wangbi
- Genre: Historical; Romance; Political; Melodrama
- Created by: KBS Drama Production
- Written by: Choi Jin-young
- Directed by: Lee Jung-sub; Song Ji-won
- Creative directors: Yoo Ho-joon; Kim Min-joon; Im Seung-hyun
- Starring: Park Min-young; Yeon Woo-jin; Lee Dong-gun
- Music by: Lee Pil-ho
- Country of origin: South Korea
- Original language: Korean
- No. of episodes: 20

Production
- Executive producers: Sung Joon-hye; Park Seong-hye; Moon Bo-hyun; Kim Joo-suk
- Producers: Kim Hye-jung; Jung Yeon-soo
- Cinematography: Jung Hae-geun; Yoon Tae-gi
- Editor: Kim Yoo-mi
- Camera setup: Single-camera
- Running time: 60 minutes
- Production companies: Monster Union; OH!BROTHERS Production

Original release
- Network: KBS2
- Release: May 31 – August 3, 2017

Queen for Seven Days (Korean: 7일의 왕비; RR: 7irui wangbi; lit. '7 Day Queen') is a South Korean television series starring Park Min-young as the titular Queen Dangyeong, with Yeon Woo-jin and Lee Dong-gun. It aired on KBS2 every Wednesday and Thursday at 22:00 (KST) from May 31, 2017, to August 3, 2017.

== Cast ==
=== Main ===
- Park Min-young as Shin Chae-kyung, later known as Queen Dangyeong
  - Park Si-eun as young Shin Chae-kyung
- Yeon Woo-jin as Lee Yeok, Grand Prince Jinseong/Nak-chun, later King Jungjong
  - Baek Su-ho as young Lee Yeok
  - Choi Jung-hoo as child Lee Yeok
- Lee Dong-gun as Crown Prince Lee Yung, King Yeonsangun
  - Ahn Do-gyu as young Crown Prince Lee Yung
  - Lee Seung-woo as child Crown Prince Lee Yung

=== Supporting ===
==== Royal family ====
- Do Ji-won as Queen Dowager Jasun, Lee Yeok's mother
- Song Ji-in as Queen Shin, Lee Yung's primary wife and Chae-kyung's paternal aunt
- Son Eun-seo as Jang Nok-su, Royal Consort Suk-yong of the Heungdeok Jang clan. Lee Yung's most favored concubine as well as confidante.

==== Ministers ====
- Jang Hyun-sung as Shin Soo-geun, Queen Shin's older brother and Chae-kyung's father
- Kang Shin-il as Im Sa-hong, Lee Yung's close confidant
- Park Won-sang as Park Won-jong, Myung-hye's maternal uncle
- Yoo Hyung-kwan as Yoo Soon-jung
- Yoo Seung-bong as Yoo Ja-kwang
- Lee Hwa-ryong as Sung Hee-an

==== Extended ====
- Kang Ki-young as Jo Kwang-oh, Lee Yeok's friend
  - Jung Yoo-ahn as young Jo Kwang-oh
- Kim Min-ho as Baek Suk-hee, Lee Yeok's friend
  - Jo Byeong-kyu as young Baek Suk-hee
- Hwang Chan-sung as Seo Noh, Lee Yeok's personal bodyguard and friend
  - Choi Min-young as young Seo Noh
- Go Bo-gyeol as Yoon Myung-hye, Park Won-jong's maternal niece and later known as Queen Jangkyung
  - Park Seo-yeon as young Yoon Myung-hye
- Kim Jung-young as Madam Kwon, Shin Soo-geun's wife and Chae-kyung's mother
- Yeom Hye-ran as Chae-kyung's nursemaid
- Yoo Min-kyu as Ki Ryong, Lee Yung's personal bodyguard
- Choi Seung-kyung as Eunuch Kim
- Park Yong-jin as Eunuch Song
- Kim Ki-chun as Mak Gae, Seo Noh's father; a former clerk-on-duty during King Seongjong's dying moments
- Yoon In-jo as Court Lady Choi, the Dowager Queen's lady-in-waiting

=== Cameo ===
- Kim Jung-hak as King Seongjong, the previous King (flashbacks)
- Woo Hee-jin as Deposed Queen Yoon, Yeonsangun's biological mother (flashback)
- Lee Jae-woo as a Royal Commander
- Jin Hyun-kwang as a Gatekeeper
- Park Jae-keun as an escort warrior
- Yoon Jong-won as Dae Myung
- Heo Sung-tae as a Shaman
- Kim Young-sun
- Song Kyung-hwa
- Im Jung-ok
- Jeon Sung-il
- Choi Hee-do

== Production ==
In March 2017, it was announced that Park Min-young will be re-teaming with director Lee Jung-sub on Queen for Seven Days. They previously worked together on Glory Jane (2011) and Healer (2014-15). It is the first production of Monster Union, the independent content company set up by KBS in July 2016.

The drama's first script reading took place on April 7, 2017, in Yeouido, Seoul.

Prior to broadcast, lead actress Park stated that the audience could think of the drama "as Love in the Moonlight five years later," pertaining to KBS2's popular historical series starring Park Bo-gum and Kim Yoo-jung.

== Original soundtrack ==
Queen for Seven Days OST Album

Soundtrack album by Various artists
- Released: 2017
- Genre: Soundtrack
- Languages: Korean, English
- Labels: Music&NEW, Hello EMC

=== Part 1 ===
No.	Title	Lyrics	Music	Artist	Length
1.	"You're Brilliant" (눈부신 그대)	Lee Na-young	Lovelyee; The President	Yeonjung (Cosmic Girls)	03:10
2.	"You're Brilliant" (Inst.)		Lovelyee; The President		03:10
Total length:					06:20

=== Part 2 ===
No.	Title	Lyrics	Music	Artist	Length
1.	"No Matter How Hard I Try"	Yael Meyer	Yael Meyer	Yael Meyer	03:57
2.	"No Matter How Hard I Try" (Inst.)		Yael Meyer		03:57
Total length:					07:54

=== Part 3 ===
No.	Title	Lyrics	Music	Artist	Length
1.	"Love Again" (또한번 사랑해)	Lee Na-young	Dear Cloud; Kim Moon-chul; Park Soo-seok	Dear Cloud	03:57
2.	"Love Again" (Inst.)		Dear Cloud; Kim Moon-chul; Park Soo-seok		03:57
Total length:					07:54

=== Part 4 ===
No.	Title	Lyrics	Music	Artist	Length
1.	"Miss You In My Heart" (그리고 그려도)	Lee Na-young	Realmeee; Kim Jin-hoon	Junggigo	03:37
2.	"Miss You In My Heart" (Inst.)		Realmeee; Kim Jin-hoon		03:37
Total length:					07:14

=== Part 5 ===
No.	Title	Lyrics	Music	Artist	Length
1.	"When the Moonlight Shines on You" (달빛이 내릴 때)	Super Sound; Park So-ha	Super Sound	Fromm	03:25
2.	"When the Moonlight Shines on You" (Inst.)		Super Sound		03:25
Total length:					06:50

Disc 2:
No.	Title	Artist	Length
1.	"Queen for seven days" (Opening Title)	Various Artists	3:36
2.	"The King wrath"	Various Artists	2:35
3.	"Dreaming"	Various Artists	3:04
4.	"Brother's fight"	Various Artists	2:25
5.	"The truth"	Various Artists	3:16
6.	"Tragedy of blood"	Various Artists	2:57
7.	"Two hands"	Various Artists	3:33
8.	"Path of destiny"	Various Artists	2:43
9.	"Overture"	Various Artists	1:10
10.	"Burned up"	Various Artists	2:02
11.	"Collapse"	Various Artists	2:09
12.	"Dark sword"	Various Artists	1:46
13.	"The Kingdom"	Various Artists	3:56
14.	"Yoong's Anger"	Various Artists	2:53
15.	"Sadness of King"	Various Artists	3:32
16.	"Pretty"	Various Artists	2:22
17.	"Who has started?"	Various Artists	2:45
18.	"In truth"	Various Artists	2:20
19.	"Waiting for you"	Various Artists	1:45
20.	"Bright way"	Various Artists	1:45
21.	"Hopeless love"	Various Artists	2:20
22.	"Denote"	Various Artists	1:06
23.	"Beyond the clouds"	Various Artists	2:03
24.	"You and me"	Various Artists	2:40
25.	"Your whistling"	Various Artists	2:06
26.	"Spiteful"	Various Artists	2:12
27.	"Yoong's Jealousy"	Various Artists	1:01
28.	"Addiction"	Various Artists	3:23
29.	"Secret order"	Various Artists	4:30
30.	"Claw"	Various Artists	2:00
31.	"Silence effection"	Various Artists	2:20
32.	"Hidden pain"	Various Artists	1:37
33.	"Vague fear"	Various Artists	2:11
34.	"Busy child"	Various Artists	3:p0
35.	"Time of plan"	Various Artists	3:06
36.	"Pirates"	Various Artists	3:07
37.	"Night performance"	Various Artists	3:46
38.	"Childhood"	Various Artists	2:58
39.	"Hold one's breath"	Various Artists	2:46
40.	"Obey"	Various Artists	3:28
41.	"Chomabawi Rock"	Various Artists	1:22
42.	"Honey Love"	Various Artists	2:05
43.	"Far from motherland"	Various Artists	2:22
44.	"Trickery"	Various Artists	3:37
45.	"In the forest"	Various Artists	3:31
46.	"The Queen"	Various Artists	3:14
47.	"What I want?"	Various Artists	3:20
48.	"Run Shin Chae kyung"	Various Artists	2:30
49.	"Irreparable"	Various Artists	2:20
50.	"Blade toward each other"	Various Artists	1:30
51.	"Conflict"	Various Artists	1:40
52.	"I had a deep dream"	Various Artists	2:30

== Ratings ==
- In the table below, the blue numbers represent the lowest ratings and the red numbers represent the highest ratings.
- NR denotes that the drama did not rank in the top 20 daily programs on that date.

Ep.	Broadcast date	Average audience share			
Ep.	Broadcast date	TNmS		AGB Nielsen	
Ep.	Broadcast date	Nationwide	Seoul	Nationwide	Seoul
1	May 31, 2017	5.4% (NR)	5.6% (NR)	6.9% (18th)	6.7% (20th)
2	June 1, 2017	5.1% (NR)	5.2% (NR)	5.7% (NR)	5.6% (NR)
3	June 7, 2017	5.3% (NR)	5.5% (NR)	6.5% (NR)	6.3% (NR)
4	June 8, 2017	5.3% (NR)	5.6% (NR)	6.5% (NR)	6.8% (15th)
5	June 14, 2017	6.6% (NR)	7.0% (NR)	6.9% (17th)	6.5% (NR)
6	June 15, 2017	5.4% (NR)	5.5% (NR)	6.1% (NR)	6.2% (NR)
7	June 21, 2017	5.5% (NR)	5.6% (NR)	5.2% (NR)	5.3% (NR)
8	June 22, 2017	5.4% (NR)	5.7% (NR)	5.4% (NR)	5.8% (NR)
9	June 28, 2017	5.3% (NR)	5.5% (NR)	4.7% (NR)	5.1% (NR)
10	June 29, 2017	4.3% (NR)	4.9% (NR)	4.4% (NR)	5.0% (NR)
11	July 5, 2017	4.5% (NR)	5.3% (NR)	4.4% (NR)	5.4% (NR)
12	July 6, 2017	4.6% (NR)	4.8% (NR)	4.6% (NR)	4.9% (NR)
13	July 12, 2017	4.3% (NR)	4.4% (NR)	4.3% (NR)	4.5% (NR)
14	July 13, 2017	4.5% (NR)	5.2% (NR)	4.7% (NR)	5.4% (NR)
15	July 19, 2017	6.7% (NR)	7.0% (NR)	6.7% (20th)	6.4% (NR)
16	July 20, 2017	6.3% (NR)	6.5% (NR)	6.3% (19th)	6.1% (NR)
17	July 26, 2017	5.9% (NR)	6.1% (NR)	6.5% (19th)	6.2% (20th)
18	July 27, 2017	7.6% (18th)	7.3% (19th)	7.7% (15th)	7.2% (16th)
19	August 2, 2017	6.6% (16th)	6.0% (19th)	7.1% (16th)	6.2% (20th)
20	August 3, 2017	7.6% (14th)	6.8% (20th)	7.6% (16th)	7.0% (19th)
Average		5.6%	5.8%	5.9%	5.9%

== Awards and nominations ==
Year	Award	Category	Nominee	Result
2017	31st KBS Drama Awards	Excellence Award, Actor in a Mid-length Drama	Lee Dong-gun	Won
2017	31st KBS Drama Awards	Excellence Award, Actress in a Mid-length Drama	Park Min-young	Nominated
2017	31st KBS Drama Awards	Best Young Actor	Baek Su-ho	Nominated
2017	31st KBS Drama Awards	Best Young Actress	Park Si-eun	Nominated

== International Broadcast ==
- In aired starting November 23, 2017 on Now Drama Channel and FTA Live, and on ViuTV on March 27, 2018.
- In Sri Lanka, the drama is available to stream on-demand via Iflix with Sinhalese and English subtitles. It is also available to stream on-demand via the My Galaxy app on Samsung smartphones.
- In Turkey, it was aired on Kanal 7 and dubbed in Turkish known as Ömre Bedel."Ömre Bedel". Kanal7 - Kanal 7 izle, Kanal 7 canlı izle, Kanal 7 yayın akışı. 13 December 2018. Archived from the original on 2 June 2021.
