= Hopae =

Identification tags

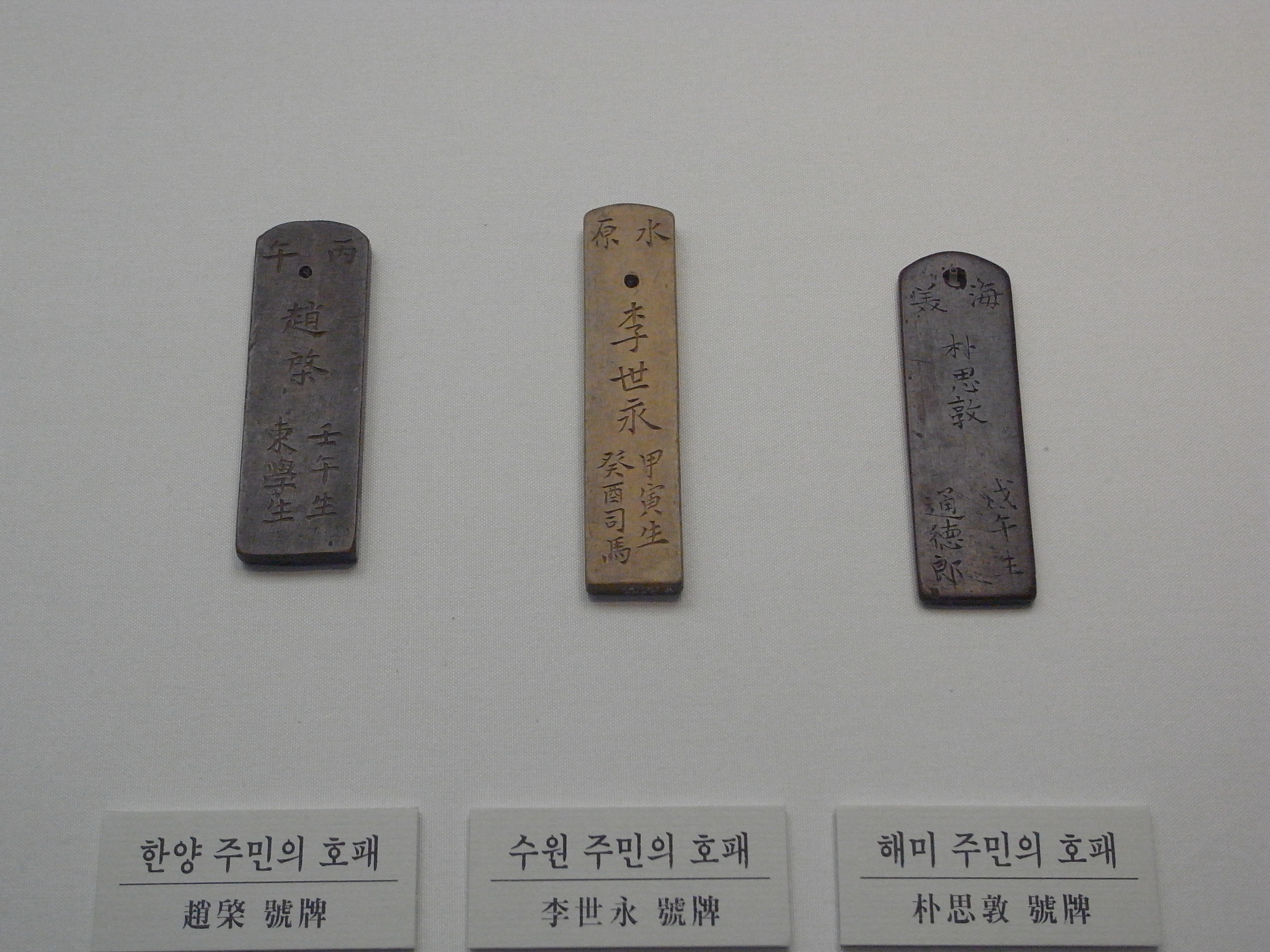

Korean name
- Hangul: 호패
- Hanja: 號牌; 戶牌
- Lit.: number tag; household tag
- RR: hopae
- MR: hop'ae

Hopae were identification tags carried by Koreans during the Joseon period, recording the bearer's name, place of birth, status and residence. The tags consist of the person's name, birthdate, and where they were born. The hopae system helped the government in tax collection and retrieving runaway slaves.

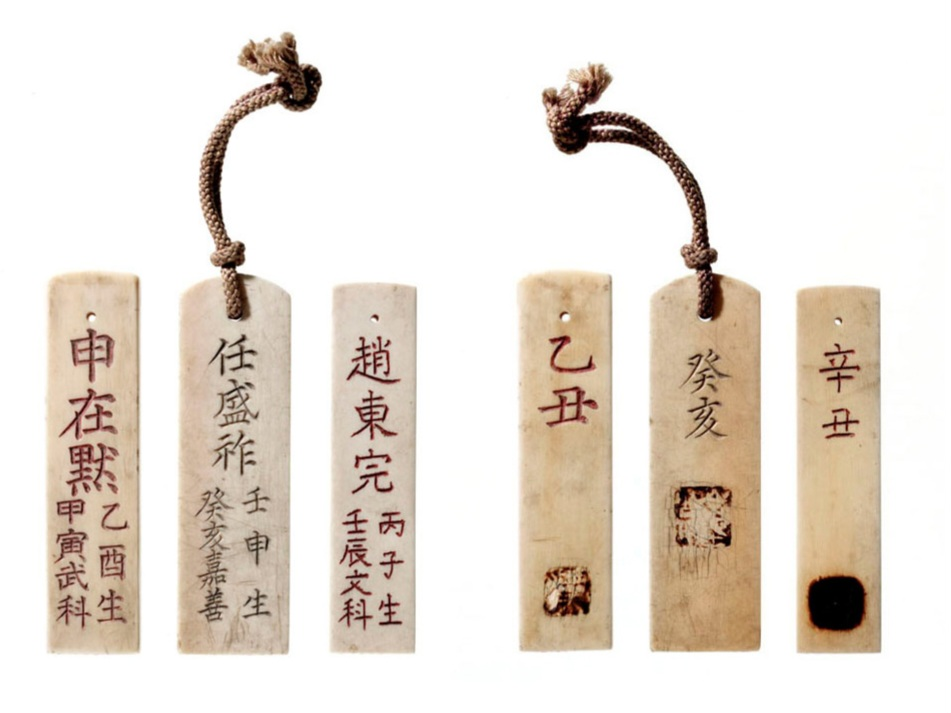
Hopae made in the late Joseon Dynasty

== History ==
Certain military officials were required to wear hopae in 1391 (imitating a similar practice by the Yuan dynasty) and its further implementation was continually raised by the Joseon government from 1398. The use of hopae was finally mandated for all males under 16 in 1413 under King Taejong. The desire to control migration was cited as a major reason behind the system in the edict which established the hopae law. However, it was abandoned only three years later in 1416, after the completion of the new household registry; this may have been because the hopae were no longer necessary after the completion of the registry, or the opposition which commoners demonstrated to the requirement of carrying hopae.

The hopae system was promulgated and abolished several times in the following years: being abolished in 1416, 1461, 1469, 1550, 1612, 1627; and reimplemented in 1459, 1469, 1536, 1610, 1626, 1675. Over a period of 260 years, it was implemented for just 18, and the Seongjong Annals reports that of the men with tags only 1-20% actually served in national military service.

King Sejo revived the system in 1458, again with the aim of controlling the movement of people, this time in order to aid in suppressing the rebellion by Yi Jing-ok in Hamgil Province, which found widespread support among peasants who had fled from their homes; the law would remain in effect for twelve more years.

Hopae again fell into disuse, but were revived by Prince Gwanghae in the early 17th century. One game played with dominoes in modern Korea takes its name from the hopae.

People of different social classes wore different coloured tags. The yangban class wore yellow, high-ranking yangban officials wore ivory while the lower-ranks wore ones of deer horn. Commoners wore small wooden tags while slaves carried large wooden ones.
