= Yu Chagwang =

Korean politician (1439–1512)

- Hangul: 유자광
- Hanja: 柳子光
- RR: Yu Jagwang
- MR: Yu Chagwang

Courtesy name
- Hangul: 우후
- Hanja: 于後
- RR: Uhu
- MR: Uhu

Yu Chagwang (Korean: 유자광; Hanja: 柳子光, 1439 – June 15, 1512) was a Korean Joseon Dynasty politician, soldier and writer. Born as the son of a yangban father and a concubine, he was one of the few secondary sons who served in high government offices during the Joseon dynasty. His courtesy name was Uhu (우후; 于後). His prime political rival was Kim Chong-jik.

== Life ==
In 1439, Yu Chagwang was born as the secondary son of Yu Kyu, of the Yeonggwang Yu clan, and his concubine, Lady Ch'oe. Yu first served as a kapsa (갑사; 甲士) or armoured soldier, who guarded Geonchunmun Gate. When Yi Si-ae's Rebellion broke out, he volunteered to serve the government forces in suppressing the rebels. He was quickly promoted to the position of a section chief in the Ministry of War (병조정랑; 兵曹正郞; pyŏngjo chŏngnang) by King Sejo. In 1468, he took the munkwa exam and placed first. When Sejo's son Yejong ascended to the throne, Yu Chagwang accused Nam I of plotting treason and was rewarded as a first class merit subject. In 1498, Yu played a key role in the First literati purge during the reign of Yeonsangun, accusing Kim Ilson of writing history drafts that were negative on King Sejo. Yu also went after Kim Ilson's deceased teacher, Kim Chong-jik, for his composition of Lament for the Rightful Emperor which he interpreted as treason. Kim Chong-jik was posthumously charged with high treason and his corpse was beheaded. Other members belonging to the sarim faction were also purged. According to later historians who wrote the Veritable Records of the Joseon Dynasty, Yu's hatred of Kim Chong-jik was due to an incident where Kim, when he served as the county magistrate of Hamyang, he destroyed Yu's poem that he had put up in that county. In 1506, he once again became a merit subject when Jungjong obtained the throne, becoming the only secondary son in the history of Joseon to become a merit subject twice. However, in 1507, Yu Chagwang was accused by the Censorate of "personal motivation" and was exiled. He was still in exile when he died on June 15, 1512.

== Popular culture ==
- Portrayed by Song Young-chang in the 2015 South Korean film The Treacherous
- Portrayed by Ryu Tae-ho in the 2017 MBC TV series The Rebel.
- Portrayed by Yoo Seung-bong in the 2017 KBS2 TV series Queen for Seven Days.

== See also ==
- Korean literati purges
