= Yi Chingok =

Joseon general (1399–1453)

Emperor of the Geum dynasty
- Reign: 1453
- Successor: None (Rebellion crushed)
- Died: November 20, 1453 (aged 53–54); Jongseong, Hamgil Province, Joseon
- Dynasty: Geum

- Yi Chingok
- Hangul: 이징옥
- Hanja: 李澄玉
- RR: I Jingok
- MR: I Chingok

Art name
- Hangul: 원봉
- Hanja: 圓峰
- RR: Wonbong
- MR: Wŏnbong

Posthumous name
- Hangul: 충강
- Hanja: 忠剛
- RR: Chunggang
- MR: Ch'unggang

Yi Chingok (Korean: 이징옥; Hanja: 李澄玉, 1399 – November 20, 1453 (Note: In the Korean calendar (lunisolar), he died on the 20th day of the 10th Lunar month.)) was a general of the Korean Joseon dynasty, known for his rebellion in 1453.

== Biography ==
He served as the Provincial Army Commander or byeongma dojeoljesa (병마도절제사; 兵馬都節制使) of Hamgil Province from 1450 until 1453. As a former subordinate of Kim Chongsŏ who was killed by his political rival Grand Prince Suyang (the future King Sejo), Yi was recalled by Grand Prince Suyang-controlled royal court who tried to replace him with Pak Ho-mun (박호문; 朴浩文) in 1453. However, Yi killed his new replacement and rose up in rebellion. He attempted to gather Jurchen support for his rebellion by declaring himself the emperor of the Geum dynasty (대금; 大金), a revival of the Jurchen Jin. He wanted to establish the new dynasty's capital at Wuguocheng (Korean: 오국성; Chinese: 五國城), but was killed in Jongseong by his subordinates, Chŏng Chong (정종; 鄭種) and Yi Haeng-gŏm (이행검; 李行儉) before he could cross the Tumen River.
