= Chang Noksu =

Korean royal consort (c. 1470–1506)

- Royal Consort of the Junior Third Rank
- Born: c. 1470; Joseon
- Died: 28 September 1506; Hanseong, Joseon
- Consort of: Yeonsangun
- Issue: 1 son, 1 daughter
- Clan: Heungdeok Chang (by birth); Jeonju Yi (by marriage)
- Dynasty: Yi
- Father: Chang Hanp'il

Korean name
- Hangul: 장녹수
- Hanja: 張綠水
- RR: Jang Noksu
- MR: Chang Noksu

Sugyong Chang (Korean: 숙용 장씨; Hanja: 淑容 張氏; c. 1470 – 28 September 1506), (Note: In the Korean calendar (lunisolar), she died on the 2nd day of the 9th lunar month.) of the Heungdeok Chang clan, personal name Chang Noksu, was a consort of Yeonsangun, the tyrannical 10th monarch of Joseon. She is remembered today as one of the greatest femmes fatales in Korean history and has often been likened to Jeong Nan-jeong and Huibin Jang. Following Yeonsangun's dethronement, she was publicly executed.

== Biography ==
=== Early life and lineage ===
Lady Chang was most likely born during the reign of King Seongjong, but the exact date of birth is unknown. Her father was Chang Hanp'il, the magistrate of Munui (문의) in Chungcheong Province, and her mother was a concubine from the cheonmin class.

Because of this status, she lived as a servant of Grand Prince Jean (제안대군), the son of King Yejong and Queen Ansun, and Yeonsangun's legal uncle. After having a son with another servant named Gano (가노), she learned singing and dancing, and became a courtesan. Despite not being particularly beautiful, she had a vibrant and youthful appearance, and possessed a natural talent for music.

=== As royal consort ===
Upon hearing her voice, Yeonsangun took Lady Chang into the palace, appointed her as a royal consort of the junior fourth rank (숙원; sugwon), sent gifts to her family, granted her slaves, fields and a residence, and bestowed an official position upon Grand Prince Jean's father-in-law, Kim Sumal (김수말). One year after entering the palace, she was elevated to the junior third rank (숙용; sugyong). In early 1506, Lady Chang's elder sister and her children were freed, becoming commoners. Based on the king's favor, her brother-in-law had alsoo previously received an official post.

Lady Chang seems to have treated Yeonsangun like a subordinate, but he favored her so much that all rulings and punishments were made under her influence. Although Lady Chang was living in the palace, private houses were demolished to build a new residence for her. In 1504, an official named Yi Byongchong (이병정) was imprisoned after supposedly insulting a servant from her residence, and was only able to avoid harm by giving a large portion of his family fortune to Lady Chang; even after the incident, he had to bribe her several more times. In 1505, Ok Chihwa (옥지화), a lower-ranking courtesan, was sentenced to beheading and had her head displayed after stepping on Lady Chang's skirt.

=== Death ===
During the Jungjong Restoration, Lady Chang was captured and then beheaded in front of the Military Arsenal (군기시), alongside Sugyong Jeon (숙용 전씨), Sugwon Kim (숙원 김씨) and others. The enraged crowd threw stones and roof tiles at her corpse.

== Titles ==
- During the reign of King Seongjong (r. 1470–1495):
  - Lady, of the Heungdeok Chang clan (흥덕 장씨; 興德張氏; from unknown date)
    - Chang Hanp'il's daughter (장한필의 딸)
    - Lady Chang (장씨; 張氏)
- During the reign of Yeonsangun (r. 1495–1506):
  - Sugwon (Note: lit. ''Lady of Warm Beauty'') (숙원; 淑媛; from 3 January 1503), royal consort of the junior fourth rank
  - Sugyong (Note: lit. ''Lady of Warm Countenance'') (숙용; 淑容; from 21 January 1504), royal consort of the junior third rank

== Family ==
- Father: Chang Hanp'il (장한필; 1455–?)
- Sibling(s)
  - Lady, of the Heungdeok Chang clan (흥덕 장씨); given name Poksu (복수) (Note: Married Kim Hyoson (김효손).)
- Husband: Gano (가노; 家奴)
  - Unnamed son
- Consort of: Yeonsangun (연산군; 2 December 1476 – 30 November 1506)
  - Lady, of the Jeonju Yi clan (전주 이씨; 1502–?) (Note: Her childhood or given name was Yŏngsu (영수).) (Note: Married Gwon Han (권한).)

== In popular culture ==
- Portrayed by Do Kum-bong in the 1962 film Prince Yeonsan.
- Portrayed by Do Kum-bong in the 1962 film Tyrant Yeonsan.
- Portrayed by Yoon Jeong-hee in the 1972 TBC TV series Song of Longing for My Mother.
- Portrayed by Lee Mi-sook in the 1984–1985 MBC TV series 500 Years of Joseon: The Ume Tree in the Midst of the Snow.
- Portrayed by Kang Soo-yeon in the 1987 film Prince Yeonsan.
- Portrayed by Kim Jin-ah in the 1988 film Diary of King Yeonsan.
- Portrayed by Park Ji-young in the 1995 KBS2 TV series Jang Nok Soo.
- Portrayed by Lee Hye-ryeon in the 1998–2000 KBS1 TV series The King and the Queen.
- Portrayed by Kang Sung-yeon in the 2005 film The King and the Clown.
- Portrayed by Oh Soo-min in the 2007–2008 SBS TV series The King and I.
- Portrayed by Jeon So-min in the 2011–2012 JTBC TV series Insu, the Queen Mother.
- Portrayed by Cha Ji-yeon in the 2015 film The Treacherous.
- Portrayed by Lee Hanee in the 2017 MBC TV series The Rebel.
- Portrayed by Son Eun-seo in the 2017 KBS2 TV series Queen for Seven Days.
- Inspired a fictional consort portrayed by Kang Han-na in the 2025 tvN TV series Bon Appétit, Your Majesty.
- Inspired a fictional consort portrayed by Song Ji-woo in the 2026 KBS2 TV series To My Beloved Thief.

== See also ==
- Society of Joseon
- Political factions of Joseon
- Styles and titles in Joseon
- Ŏudong, Deposed Queen Yun, Queen Munjeong, Kim Kaesi and Gwiin Jo — five other notorious women of the Joseon period
