= Hwang Chŏnguk =

Korean scholar-official (1532–1607)

Great Lord of Chaggye Hwang Chŏnguk
- Born: 26th day, 4th month of 1532
- Died: 14th day, 8th month of 1607; Noryangjin, Joseon
- Burial place: Paju, South Korea
- Citizenship: Joseon
- Occupation: Literati official
- Political party: Westerners
- Awards: 1st Kwangguk Merit Subject

Korean name
- Hangul: 황정욱
- Hanja: 黃廷彧
- RR: Hwang Jeonguk
- MR: Hwang Chŏnguk

Art name
- Hangul: 지천
- Hanja: 芝川
- RR: Jicheon
- MR: Chich'ŏn

Courtesy name
- Hangul: 경문
- Hanja: 景文
- RR: Gyeongmun
- MR: Kyŏngmun

Posthumous name
- Hangul: 문정
- Hanja: 文貞
- RR: Munjeong
- MR: Munjŏng

Hwang Chŏnguk (Korean: 황정욱; Hanja: 黃廷彧; 26th day, 4th month of 1532 – 14th day, 8th month of 1607) was a Korean scholar-official of the mid-Joseon period. After passing the civil service examinations in 1558, he held posts in the Office of Royal Decrees as well as various censorial and remonstrative offices within the Three Offices.

During the reign of King Seonjo, Hwang served as a Royal Lecturer, participated in court lectures, and was assigned to organize the initial draft for the compilation of the Veritable Records of Myeongjong. Despite his scholarly reputation, he was repeatedly impeached and frequently reassigned to provincial posts. He also observed extended mourning periods following the deaths of his parents, which limited the continuity of his service in the capital.

In the early 1580s, Hwang advanced to higher office after placing first in the palace examination. He was appointed Governor of Chungcheong Province and, in 1584, served as Chief Envoy to Ming China. During this mission, he submitted memorials concerning the correction of the Joseon royal genealogy in the Collected Statutes of the Ming Dynasty. After his return, he held senior posts including Minister of Taxation and Minister of War, and was invested as a First-rank Kwangguk Merit Subject.

During the Imjin War, Hwang was assigned to accompany Prince Sunhwa to Kangwon Province. In 1592, he was captured during a local uprising in Hoeryong by Kuk Kyŏngin and subsequently held by Japanese forces before being released in 1593. He was later investigated for his conduct during captivity and sentenced to exile, followed by restricted residence. Although he was eventually released, he was never reinstated to office. He died in 1607.

== Early life ==
=== Birth and education ===
Hwang Chŏnguk was born on the 26th day, 4th month of 1532. He belonged to the Jangsu Hwang clan; his father was Hwang Yŏl, and his mother was a daughter of Hŏ Yong (허용; 許墉) of the Yangcheon Hŏ clan. Born into a yangban family, he received early instruction from his grandfather and father. His grandfather, Hwang Kijun (황기준; 黃起峻), is recorded as having transcribed Du Fu's regulated verses, while his father, Hwang Yŏl, directly instructed him in literary studies. After reaching maturity, he went to Yeoju, where he studied under Kim Yubu (김유부; 金有孚), a son of Kim An'guk, and Kim Ki (김기; 金器), a disciple of Kim An'guk. Thereafter, he studied the core Confucian classics as well as texts classified under the Philosophies and Histories.

=== Early career ===
Hwang passed the preliminary civil service examination (사마시; 司馬試) in 1552, and in 1558 passed the triennial state civil service examination (식년시; 式年試) with third-tier honors (병과; 丙科). He subsequently held a series of posts, including Editorial Examiner (검열; 檢閱) at the Office of Royal Decrees (예문관; 藝文館) and First-tier Instructor (교수; 敎授). In the 8th month of 1561, he was appointed Assistant Section Chief (좌랑; 佐郎) of the Ministry of Taxation (호조; 戶曹), while concurrently serving as an Associate Compiler (기사관; 記事官) at the Office of State Records. In the 12th month of the same year, he was transferred to the post of Assistant Section Chief of the Ministry of Rites (예조; 禮曹).

In 1562, following conflicts with senior officials, Hwang was demoted to the post of Magistrate of Haemi. After serving as a Inspector (도사; 都事) of Ch'ŏnghong Province, he returned to central office and went on to hold a range of censorial and remonstrative posts, including Sixth Counselor (수찬; 修撰) of the Office of Special Advisors, Fourth Inspector (지평; 持平) at the Office of the Inspector-General, and Third Censor (헌납; 獻納) at the Office of the Censor-General, thereby serving in multiple censorial and remonstrative posts within the Three Offices.

== Career during Seonjo reign ==
=== Scholarly activity at court ===
After King Seonjo's accession, in 1568, when the Office of Annals (실록청; 實錄廳) was established to compile the Veritable Records of Myeongjong, Hwang Chŏnguk was assigned responsibility for the practical work of organizing the initial draft of the annals. Thereafter, he served successively as Junior Fourth Adviser (부응교; 副應敎) and Editor (교리; 校理) at the Office of Royal Decrees. He also participated in royal lectures as a Royal Lecturer (경연관; 經筵官), delivering expository lectures at court. According to his obituary written by Hong Sŏbong (홍서봉; 洪瑞鳳), Hwang Chŏnguk attracted King Seonjo's attention through lectures grounded in the Confucian classics, and No Susin evaluated him as the most capable among the royal lecturers. It is also recorded that through scholarly debates with Ki Taesŭng, Hwang's academic abilities were recognized to such an extent that Ki advised his disciples to take Hwang Chŏnguk as their teacher should they travel to the capital.

=== Stagnation and reappointment ===
Despite his scholarly reputation, Hwang Chŏnguk did not secure sustained confidence within the bureaucratic community. He was impeached on multiple occasions and was consequently appointed primarily to provincial posts. Furthermore, in 1573 and again in 1575, he successively observed mourning for the deaths of his parents and withdrew from office, resulting in a prolonged stagnation in his official career during the early years of King Seonjo's reign. After completing the mourning period in 1578, he served as Director (정; 正) of the Government Arsenal (군기시; 軍器寺) and as Right Master of Ceremonies (우통례; 右通禮) of the Office for National Ritual (통례원; 通禮院), but resigned due to illness. In 1580, he was appointed Magistrate of Jinju, yet fell ill again while en route to his post, returned home, and resigned; in the course of these events, he was dismissed from office following impeachment by remonstrance officials.

In 1582, although he was once again dismissed on the grounds of illness, Yi I defended Hwang Chŏnguk and petitioned for his reappointment, whereupon King Seonjo appointed him Left Master of Ceremonies (좌통례; 左通禮) of the Office for National Ritual. When Yi I later served as Imperial Envoy at the Border (원접사; 遠接使), he sought to appoint Hwang as an aide, but this plan was not realized because Hwang was then performing official duties in Gyeongsang Province. In 1583, Hwang Chŏnguk again sat for the palace examination (정시; 庭試) and placed first overall. As a result, he was promoted to the senior third-rank title of Grand Master for Comprehensive Governance (통정대부; 通政大夫) and appointed Governor of Chungcheong Province.

=== Diplomatic mission to Ming China ===
On the 18th day, 2nd month of 1584, Hwang Chŏnguk was selected as Chief Envoy (주청사; 奏請使) to Ming China to address the protracted dispute over the Joseon royal lineage, known as the Chonggye Pyŏnmu. The purpose of the delegation was to seek correction of a statement in the Collected Statutes of the Ming Dynasty that identified King Taejo, the founder of Joseon, as a descendant of Yi Inim—a late-Goryeo nobleman condemned as a traitor.

At the time, Hwang Chŏnguk was serving as Governor of Chungcheong Province. He was subsequently transferred Royal Secretariat as Sixth Royal Secretary (동부승지; 同副承旨), a post he held for approximately two months. On the 3rd day, 5th month of 1584, he departed for Ming China together with Vice Envoy (서장관; 書狀官) Han Ŭngin and Verification Officer (질정관; 質正官) Song Sanghyŏn. Upon Hwang's arrival in Beijing, the Ministry of Rites of China requested a detailed written explanation of the circumstances. In response, Hwang Chŏnguk composed a lengthy memorial requesting the correction of the genealogical records. After receiving the document, the Minister of Rites acknowledged it, praised Hwang's writing, and indicated that the revision would be carried out.

In the 11th month, Hwang returned to Joseon carrying a certified copy of the draft of the Collected Statutes of the Ming Dynasty reflecting revisions to the Joseon royal genealogy, together with an imperial edict stating that the completed text would be sent to Joseon upon its formal promulgation. Following his return, Hwang Chŏnguk was promoted to Second Deputy Director (동지사; 同知事) of the Privy Council (중추부; 中樞府), and later to Minister of Taxation.

Subsequently, in 1587, Yu Hong brought back the original manuscript of the revised genealogical sections of the Collected Statutes of the Ming Dynasty, and in 1589, Yun Kŭnsu obtained a complete copy of the work, bringing the process of genealogical rectification to a close. In the 8th month of 1590, the court invested those involved in the diplomatic missions related to the Chonggye Pyŏnmu as Kwangguk Merit Subject. Hwang Chŏnguk was invested as a First-rank Kwangguk Merit Subject and was ennobled as Great Lord of Changgye (장계부원군; 長溪府院君).

== Imjin War ==
=== Preparation for the Imjin War ===
In the 1st month of 1591, Hwang Chŏnguk was appointed Minister of War. In the 3rd month of the same year, the diplomatic envoys Hwang Yun'gil and Kim Sŏngil returned from Japan and submitted differing assessments regarding the likelihood of a Japanese invasion. Hwang Chŏnguk endorsed Hwang Yun'gil's assessment that Japan was likely to initiate hostilities. In response to this assessment, Hwang advanced a series of preparatory military measures. These measures included the selection of capable warriors from each province, the compilation of personal records of examination-qualified military candidates for emergency mobilization, and the training of underpaid soldiers at the Office of Military Training (훈련원; 訓鍊院).

Meanwhile, after a letter from Toyotomi Hideyoshi expressing his intention to campaign against the Ming and requesting passage through Joseon territory reached the Joseon court, a debate arose over whether the contents should be reported to the Ming government. Hwang Chŏnguk, together with Yun Tusu, argued that the letter should be reported to the Ming court. During discussions on the 4th day, 5th month of 1591, Hwang reiterated this position, citing Joseon's obligation to maintain good faith toward the Ming, the risk of a Japanese surprise attack, and the argument that defensive preparations would not be harmful even in the absence of hostilities. King Seonjo accepted this argument and, through the Envoy for Celebrating the Emperor's Birthday (성절사; 聖節使) Kim Ŭngnam, submitted an advisory memorial to the Ming court. Nevertheless, in the 7th month of the same year, Hwang Chŏnguk was dismissed from office amid accusations that he was associated with the political faction of Chŏng Ch'ŏl, who had earlier been removed from office over the issue of the royal heir.

=== Escorting Prince Sunhwa ===
On the 13th day, 4th month of 1592, the Imjin War began. When news reached the Joseon court on the 17th day of the same month, King Seonjo dispatched Yi Il and appointed Sin Rip as Supreme Inspector (순변사; 巡邊使) of the Three Provinces. Both commanders subsequently suffered defeats at Sangju and Ch'ungju, respectively. Upon receiving reports of Sin Rip's defeat on the 28th day, 4th month, King Seonjo resolved to evacuate the capital.

In conjunction with the evacuation, King Seonjo dispatched the royal princes to various regions to mobilize loyalist forces, sending Prince Sunhwa to Kangwŏn Province. On the 29th day, 4th month, Han Chun (한준; 韓準) and Yi Ki (이기; 李墍) were initially designated to escort Prince Sunhwa. On the following day, Hwang Chŏnguk and his son Hwang Hyŏk—who was also Prince Sunhwa's father-in-law—put themselves forward for the role. Hwang Chŏnguk was accordingly appointed Recruitment Commissioner (호소사; 號召使) and ordered to accompany the prince.

Hwang Chŏnguk accompanied Prince Sunhwa to Kangwŏn Province and remained at Ch'ŏrwŏn, where he issued proclamations calling for the mobilization of loyalist forces. After receiving reports that Japanese forces had entered Kangwŏn Province, he altered the route northward. Passing through Hoeyang, Ch'ujiryŏng Pass (추지령; 楸地嶺), and T'ongch'ŏn, he reached Anbyŏn in Hamgyŏng Province and joined the entourage of Prince Imhae. The group continued northward as Katō Kiyomasa's forces advanced in pursuit of the two princes. On the 18th day, 7th month, after learning of Han Kŭkham's defeat at the Battle of Haejŏngch'ang, the group moved to Hoeryŏng.

=== Captivity ===
On the 23rd day, 7th month of 1592, Kuk Kyŏngin led an uprising at Hoeryŏng, during which Prince Imhae and Prince Sunhwa, together with their entourage, were taken into captivity. During this incident, Hwang Chŏnguk was also captured, along with Hwang Hyŏk and Kim Kwiyŏng. On the following day, the captives were handed over to Katō Kiyomasa, who had arrived at Hoeryŏng, and were confined in earthen caves at Anbyŏn before being moved together with Japanese forces. Katō's troops withdrew to Hansŏng in the 2nd month of 1593.

On the 13th day, 3rd month of 1593, while Katō Kiyomasa and the captives were stationed in Hansŏng, Kim Ch'ŏnil dispatched Yi Sinch'ung (이신충; 李藎忠) to observe conditions within the Japanese camp. In the course of this mission, Katō requested that the princes' entourage compose a letter expressing an intention to negotiate peace. Hwang Chŏnguk refused this demand; however, after Japanese forces threatened to execute the princes, Hwang Hyŏk wrote the letter in accordance with Japanese demands on his behalf. Hwang Chŏnguk separately prepared another version of a memorial written in Hangul. The latter document explained that the contents of the former letter was not true and included information concerning conditions within the Japanese camp.

On the 14th day, Yi Sinch'ung received from Katō Kiyomasa a set of documents, including a letter addressed to a Ming general, reply letters from the two princes, a letter written in Hangul, and a letter bearing the names of Hwang Chŏnguk and his son. The Hangul letter was not delivered to the Joseon court. Consequently, only the letter prepared in conformity with Japanese demands was transmitted to the Joseon court through Yu Sŏngnyong. When Yu Sŏngnyong conveyed these letters to King Seonjo at the time, he reported that, in his assessment, the phrasing of the letters raised serious concerns. The letter bearing the names of Hwang Chŏnguk and his son, delivered by Yi Sinch'ung, did not include expressions identifying the writer as a subject of Joseon and referred to Toyotomi Hideyoshi as "Kwanbaek Chŏnha" (His Highness).

In the 4th month of 1593, as Japanese forces withdrew from Hansŏng, Hwang Chŏnguk likewise moved south and arrived in Busan around the 6th month of the same year. On the 20th day, 6th month, Hwang Chŏnguk was released and returned ahead of the two princes and Hwang Hyŏk.

== Final years ==
=== Exile ===
Hwang Chŏnguk was accused of having submitted memorials advocating peace negotiations during his captivity. Hwang Chŏnguk stated during the investigation that the memorials referring to peace negotiations had been intended as a stratagem to facilitate the princes' escape, and that he had sent two versions of the letter, one written in accordance with Japanese demands and another conveying his actual intentions, of which only the version written in accordance with Japanese demands was transmitted. He further argued that the expression "Kwanbaek Chŏnha" had precedents in earlier diplomatic correspondence and was used in accordance with Japanese demands. Following the conclusion of the investigation in the 8th month of 1593, Hwang Chŏnguk was exiled to Kilju.

Even after Hwang Chŏnguk's exile, the Office of the Inspector-General and the Office of the Censor-General continued to submit memorials requesting that he undergo a formal criminal interrogation. King Seonjo did not approve these requests. In 1595, the Border Defense Council raised the need for renewed interrogation, and an interrogation was subsequently conducted. As a result, Hwang Chŏnguk was sentenced to wiri anch'i (위리안치; 圍籬安置), a form of restricted residence within a fenced enclosure. On the 3rd day, 2nd month of 1597, acting upon a petition submitted by Hwang Chŏnguk's granddaughter, who was the wife of Prince Sunhwa, King Seonjo ordered his release.

=== Death ===
Although Hwang Chŏnguk was released from exile, he was barred from entering the capital and required to reside in rural areas due to continued opposition from court officials. He subsequently moved from Hwanghae Province to Gyeonggi Province and lived without a fixed residence. During this period, King Seonjo on several occasions bestowed medicinal confections and food upon him.

In 1600 and 1601, Yun Inbaek (윤인백; 尹仁伯) and Yun Kŭnsu submitted memorials arguing that Hwang Chŏnguk had been treated unjustly. In response, King Seonjo issued an order in 1602 granting him full freedom. Despite this, Hwang Chŏnguk was never reinstated to office. He died on the 14th day, 8th month of 1607, at his residence in Noryang.
