= Kim Kwiyŏng =

Korean scholar-official (1520–1593)

Great Lord of Sangnak Kim Kwiyŏng

Left State Councillor
- In office 11th month of 1581 – 7th month of 1583
- Preceded by: No Susin
- Succeeded by: Chŏng Yugil

Right State Councillor
- In office 10th month of 1581 – 11th month of 1581
- Preceded by: Chŏng Yugil
- Succeeded by: Chŏng Chiyŏn

Personal details
- Born: 1st day, 11th month of 1520 Ch'ŏngp'ung, Joseon
- Died: 29th day, 5th month of 1593 Huichon, Joseon
- Resting place: Chungju, South Korea
- Citizenship: Joseon
- Party: Easterners
- Occupation: Literati official
- Awards: 2nd P'yŏngnan Merit Subject
- Clan: Sangsan Kim clan

Korean name
- Hangul: 김귀영
- Hanja: 金貴榮
- RR: Gim Gwiyeong
- MR: Kim Kwiyŏng

Art name
- Hangul: 동원
- Hanja: 東園
- RR: Dongwon
- MR: Tongwŏn

Courtesy name
- Hangul: 현경
- Hanja: 顯卿
- RR: Hyeongyeong
- MR: Hyŏn'gyŏng

Kim Kwiyŏng (Korean: 김귀영; Hanja: 金貴榮; 1st day, 11th of 1520 – 29th day, 5th of 1593) was a Korean scholar-official of the mid-Joseon period. After passing the civil service examinations in 1547, he held a range of central posts, including offices within the Three Offices, and gradually advanced through the bureaucracy amid the factional politics and institutional strains of the mid-sixteenth century.

While serving as Inspector General during King Myeongjong's reign, Kim submitted several policy memorials addressing perceived shortcomings in state governance. The most notable of these, the Chinp'yep'aljoso ("Memorial on Eight Current Abuses"), outlined issues concerning royal authority, personnel administration, social customs, education, and corvée labor. His memorials emphasized administrative discipline and institutional reform, drawing on Confucian political norms, though many of the proposals were not implemented.

In the late sixteenth century, Kim reached the highest ranks of government, serving successively as Right and Left State Councillor. His tenure coincided with intensified factional conflict between the Easterners and Westerners, and in 1583 he resigned following royal criticism arising from an impeachment controversy involving Yi I. In 1589, Kim participated as an investigating commissioner in the state inquiry into the alleged rebellion of Chŏng Yŏrip. Following his service as an investigating commissioner, he was invested as a Second-rank Py'ŏngnan Meritorious Subject, and was ennobled as Great Lord of Sangnak.

During the Imjin War, Kim was assigned to escort Prince Imhae to Hamgyong Province. In 1592, he was captured during a local uprising in Hoeryong by Kuk Kyŏngin and subsequently transferred to Japanese custody. He was later released but was stripped of office and sentenced to exile. Kim Kwiyŏng died in 1593 while traveling to his place of banishment.

== Early life ==
Kim Kwiyŏng was born on the 1st day, 11th month of 1520 at the government office of Ch'ŏngp'ung, Joseon. He belonged to the Sangsan Kim clan; his father was Kim Ŭngmu (김응무; 金應武), and his mother was a lady of the Seongju Yi clan, the daughter of Yi Sugwan (이수관; 李守寬). In 1532, at the age of thirteen, he studied under Yun Kwan. In 1537, Kim married Yun Kwan's daughter. Three years later he passed both the Classics Licentiate Examination (생원시; 生員試) and Literary Licentiate Examination (진사시; 進士試). In 1547, he passed the literary section of the special state examination held in the royal presence (알성시; 謁聖試) with third-tier honors (병과; 丙科).

== Career during Myeongjong reign ==
=== Early career ===
In 1549, Kim was appointed Awaiting-order Editor (대교; 待敎) of the Office of Royal Decrees (예문관; 藝文館). He concurrently served as an Associate Compiler (기사관; 記事官) at the Office of State Records and participated in the compilation of the Veritable Records of Jungjong. Thereafter, in 1550, he assumed posts including First Copist (저작; 著作), Erudite (박사; 博士). The following year, he successively held posts as Deputy Compiler (부수찬; 副修撰) of the Office of Special Advisors, as well as Fourth Censor (정언; 正言) at the Office of the Censor-General.

In the 5th month of 1555, when approximately sixty Japanese vessels invaded Jeolla Province, he was sent to Gwangju as a staff officer under the Supreme Inspector Yi Chun'gyŏng. Following the incident, he was promoted to the senior third-rank title of Grand Master for Comprehensive Governance (통정대부; 通政大夫). In the 9th month of the same year, together with figures such as Kim Hongdo (김홍도; 金弘度), Yu Sunsŏn (유순선; 柳順善), and others, he was selected for the royal privilege of sagadoksŏ (사가독서; 賜暇讀書), a system under which selected officials were granted leave for study. Subsequently, in the leap 11th month of 1555, he was appointed Senior Section Chief (정랑; 正郎) of the Ministry of Personnel (이조; 吏曹). He successively held a number of offices, including Regulation Transcriber (검상; 檢詳) of the State Council, Chŏnhan (전한; 典翰) of the Office of Royal Decrees, Sixth Royal Secretary (동부승지; 同副承旨) of the Royal Secretariat, and magistrate of Chuncheon. On the 22nd day, 1st month of 1564, he was appointed Inspector General (대사헌; 大司憲) of the Office of the Inspector-General.

=== Proposals for reform: Chinp'yep'aljoso ===
While serving as Inspector General, on the 10th day, 2nd month of 1564, Kim Kwiyŏng submitted a memorial known as the Chinp'yep'aljoso (진폐팔조소; 陳弊八條疏; 'Memorial on Eight Current Abuses'), also referred to as Sojinp'aljo (소진팔조; 疏陳八條). Through this memorial, Kim directly identified the causes of eight major abuses spanning politics, society, and the economy, and argued that their resolution depended on royal leadership. The contents of Chinp'yep'aljoso outlined eight areas of abuse, which may be summarized as follows:

First, discipline must be rectified. This called for restoring royal authority to ensure the effective enforcement of commands and laws. Second, the inner court must be strictly regulated, meaning that petitions, favoritism, and political interference in personnel and state affairs then prevalent should be prevented. Third, the morale of the scholar-officials must be raised. Kim criticized the situation in which scholar-officials, traditionally regarded as central to state governance by rejecting duplicity through forthright remonstrance and orthodox argument, were unable to speak frankly to the king because of the legacy of the literati purges. Fourth, a sense of shame must be encouraged. He argued that governance should be grounded in the four cardinal principles—propriety, righteousness, integrity, and shame—while emphasizing probity and avoiding greed.

Fifth, the cultivation of sound social customs is essential. This article was a warning against the spread of extravagance. Sixth, the appointment of officials is of paramount importance. In this article, Kim pointed out abuses such as bribery in appointments, advancement through hereditary privilege, and discrimination between civil and military officials. Seventh, schools are vital to the education of scholars and to the promotion of morals and moral transformation. Kim argued that extravagance, low morale, and corruption undermined educational institutions and thereby aggravated political abuses, proposing proper schooling grounded in Confucian ideals as the remedy. Finally, corvée labor concerns both the sufficiency of state finances and the mobilization of the people's strength. Kim emphasized the livelihood of the populace and insisted that alleviating abuses in corvée labor required urgent measures such as tax reductions and cuts in expenditures to relieve popular hardship.

Upon receiving the memorial, King Myeongjong stated that he would examine its contents and consider measures to address the abuses identified. Later that month, on the 30th day, he was appointed to Deputy Director at the Office of Special Advisors.

=== Other memorials ===
On the 6th day and 14th day, 1st month of 1565, Kim Kwiyŏng submitted memorials in which he discussed the charges and appropriate punishments of Yi Ryang and his associates. Yi Ryang had risen to prominence during the reign of King Myeongjong and was accused by contemporaries of exerting influence over personnel administration and targeting political rivals such as Pak Sorip (박소립; 朴素立) and Yun Tusu. Yi Ryang had previously been impeached on the 19th day, 8th month of 1563, through a memorial submitted by Vice Director Ki Taehang, and subsequently exiled. Kim Kwiyŏng argued that exile constituted an insufficient punishment for Yi Ryang and called for a more severe penalty; however, King Myeongjong did not adopt this recommendation.

In addition, on the 15th day, 3rd month of 1565, Kim submitted a memorial addressing alleged abuses among Buddhist monks and maladministration within the Royal Treasury (내수사; 內需司). Following the death of Queen Munjeong, Kim also submitted a memorial calling for the punishment of Pou, abbot of Bongeunsa, who had enjoyed royal patronage during the queen's lifetime. Subsequently, on the 3rd day, 8th month, Kim submitted an impeachment memorial against Yun Wŏnhyŏng, a royal in-law who occupied a powerful position at court. None of these memorials were accepted by King Myeongjong.

Later that year, on the 10th day, 10th month of 1565, Kim submitted another memorial, the Chinp'yesibijoso (진폐십이조소; 陳弊十二條疏; 'Memorial on Twelve Current Abuses'), which further expanded upon the reform proposals outlined in his earlier memorials. Compared with the earlier memorial, Chinp'yep'aljoso, the Chinp'yesibijoso addressed a broader range of perceived abuses, including matters concerning the inner palace, problems within the Royal Treasury, and issues related to Buddhist monks. Chinp'yesibijoso also treated official appointments and administrative responsibility in more specific terms. In the third, seventh, and eighth article, Kim emphasized the role and responsibilities of royal princes, provincial magistrates and military commanders respectively. Kim also addressed the issues of morale and loyal remonstrance, arguing that King Myeongjong did not adequately accept forthright counsel from his officials. Although King Myeongjong expressed reservations regarding certain points, the memorial was formally acknowledged. In the 11th month of 1565, Kim withdrew from office in order to observe mourning rites following the death of his mother.

== Career during Seonjo reign ==
After completing the mourning period, Kim Kwiyŏng was appointed Chief Royal Secretary (도승지; 都承旨) in the 2nd month of 1568, and in the 5th month of the same year he was transferred to the post of Minister of Rites. He subsequently held a number of senior offices, including Inspector General, Director (대제학; 大提學) of the Office of Special Advisors, and ministerial posts in several boards. In 1580, Kim was promoted to the lower junior first rank of Grand Master for Esteemed Governance (숭정대부; 崇政大夫) and appointed Right Associate State Councilor (우찬성; 右贊成). In the 10th month of 1581, he was elevated to Right State Councillor, and in the 11th month of the same year he was further promoted to Left State Councillor.

=== Impeachment controversy over Yi I ===
In 1583, during Kim Kwiyŏng's tenure as Left State Councillor, factional conflict between the Easterners and Westerners intensified. In the 6th month of that year, the Three Offices submitted an impeachment memorial against Yi I, then Minister of War, leading to his resignation. On the 15th day, 7th month, however, Sŏng Hon submitted a memorial defending Yi I, and the controversy continued. In response, King Seonjo summoned senior officials, including Chief State Councillor Pak Sun, Right State Councillor Chŏng Chiyŏn, Chief Royal Secretary Pak Kŭnwŏn, and Left State Councillor Kim Kwiyŏng, to determine who had been responsible for excluding Yi I. At this meeting, Pak Sun named Hŏ Pong and Song Ŭnggae (송응개; 宋應漑), whereas Kim Kwiyŏng offered no clear response.

On the following day, King Seonjo criticized Kim for failing to make a clear judgment on the matter and questioned his suitability for continued service as a state councillor. On the same day, although Pak Kŭnwŏn submitted a memorial in Kim's defense, King Seonjo rejected the argument, stating that an official unable to render judgment could not remain in office. A few days later, Kim Kwiyŏng offered his resignation, which King Seonjo accepted.

=== 1589 rebellion of Chŏng Yŏrip ===
Kim Kwiyŏng subsequently served in senior posts, including Second Minister-without-Portfolio at Privy Council (중추부; 中樞府), and in 1589 was admitted to the Office of Officials Aged Seventy and Older (기로소; 耆老所). On the 2nd day, 10th month of that year, Han Chun (한준; 韓準), Governor of Hwanghae Province, and others submitted a confidential report alleging that Chŏng Yŏrip was plotting rebellion. Once this information became known, Chŏng Yŏrip fled, and an arrest order was issued against his associates throughout the provinces. On the 8th day, 10th month, King Seonjo conducted a state interrogation of the suspects in Hwanghae Province, in which Kim Kwiyŏng participated in his capacity as Second Minister-without-Portfolio. Chŏng Yŏrip committed suicide while in flight, and on the 27th day of the same month those directly implicated in the case were executed.

On the following day, the licentiate Yang Chŏnhoe (양천회; 梁千會) submitted a memorial criticizing the investigation on the grounds that figures of the Easterners faction who had been close to Chŏng Yŏrip had not been subjected to examination. In the 11th month, the Westerner leader Chŏng Ch'ŏl was appointed Right State Councillor, and royal interrogations were conducted of Chŏng Ŏnsin, Yi Pal, and others. During the interrogation of Chŏng Ŏnsin, Kim Kwiyŏng stated that he had difficulty assessing the testimony because of impaired hearing. Regarding Yi Pal, Kim testified that no clear evidence of participation in treason had been established. Although Chŏng Ŏnsin and Yi Pal were ultimately sentenced to exile, Kim Kwiyŏng, serving as an investigating commissioner, conducted examinations and obtained formal depositions from numerous suspects. According to his obituary, Kim was described as having conducted investigations involving implicated relatives with caution and restraint, resulting in the mitigation of punishments in several cases.

In the 8th month of 1590, the court enfeoffed those deemed to have rendered meritorious service in resolving the Chŏng Yŏrip affair as Py'ŏngnan Meritorious Subjects (평난공신; 平難功臣). In recognition of his service as an investigating commissioner, Kim Kwiyŏng was invested as a Second-rank Py'ŏngnan Meritorious Subject, and was ennobled as Great Lord of Sangnak (상락부원군; 上洛府院君).

== Imjin War ==
=== Debate over royal evacuation ===
At the outbreak of the Imjin War on the 13th day, 4th month of 1592, Kim Kwiyŏng was First Minister-without-Portfolio at Privy Council. When news of the war reached the court on the 17th day of the same month, King Seonjo dispatched Yi Il and appointed Sin Rip as Supreme Inspector (순변사; 巡邊使) of the Three Provinces. Both commanders, however, were defeated, Yi Il at Sangju and Sin Rip at Chungju. After receiving reports of Sin Rip's defeat on the 28th day, King Seonjo proposed abandoning the capital.

Kim Kwiyŏng opposed the proposal on Confucian grounds, arguing that both the Jongmyo (Royal Ancestral Shrine) and the Sajik (Altar of Soil and Grain) were located in Hansŏng. Other senior officials, including Sin Chap and Pak Tonghyŏn (박동현; 朴東賢), likewise opposed the proposal, prompting King Seonjo to withdraw into the inner court. Shortly thereafter, the king reiterated his intention to flee, and support from Yi Sanhae, Yu Sŏngnyong, and others led to the final decision to evacuate the capital. To address objections based on Confucian principle, King Seonjo ordered the spirit tablets of Jongmyo and Sajik to accompany the royal procession.

=== Escorting Prince Imhae ===
King Seonjo dispatched the royal princes to various regions to raise loyalist forces. Kim Kwiyŏng was ordered, together with Yun T'agyŏn, to escort Prince Imhae. In the early morning of the 30th day, 4th month, Kim Kwiyŏng and Yun T'agyŏn departed Changdeokgung escorting Prince Imhae toward Hamgyŏng Province. They crossed Ch'ŏllyŏng on the 5th day, 5th month, arriving at Anbyŏn, and reached Tŏgwŏn on the 9th day.

At that time, rumors circulated in Hamgyŏng Province that King Seonjo had left P'yŏngyang and intended to seek refuge in Ming China, causing widespread unrest among the populace. Moreover, following Han Kŭkham's defeat at the Battle of Haejŏngch'ang on the 18th day, 7th month, both the administrative and military systems in the region largely collapsed. Upon learning of this, Prince Imhae's entourage moved further north to Hoeryŏng. Kim Kwiyŏng attempted to restore administrative and military order by appointing Yi Yŏng (이영; 李瑛) as Supreme Inspector of Hamgyong Provinces, and Mun Mongwŏn (문몽원; 文夢轅) as magistrate of Hoeryŏng, but these measures produced no tangible results.

=== Captivity ===
On the 23rd day, 7th month of 1592, Kuk Kyŏngin instigated a rebellion at Hoeryŏng, during which Prince Imhae, Prince Sunhwa, and their entourage were taken captive. Kim Kwiyŏng was also captured, together with Hwang Chŏnguk, Hwang Hyŏk, and others. On the following day, the captured princes and their entourage were handed over to Katō Kiyomasa upon his arrival at Hoeryŏng and subsequently confined in earthen caves in the Anbyŏn. The court did not learn of the princes' capture until the 4th day, 9th month.

On the 2nd day, 10th month, the two princes at Anbyŏn, together with Kim Kwiyŏng, Hwang Chŏnguk, and others, sent a confidential document to King Seonjo proposing that their escape be arranged through the provision of gold, silver, and tiger pelts. On the 19th day of the same month, Yi Hongŏp (이홍업; 李弘業) delivered to the court written statements bearing the names of Kim Kwiyŏng and other civil officials, along with letters from military officials, as well as from Katō Kiyomasa. The letter attributed to the civil officials conveyed proposals concerning peace negotiations, including a plan to partition the frontier of Joseon. The court held Kim Kwiyŏng responsible for the princes' capture while they were under his escort and stripped him of his offices and ranks on the 20th day, 10th month.

On the 4th day, 3rd month of 1593, Kim Kwiyŏng sent a report from the Japanese camp to the court, stating that the Japanese side desired negotiations and that peace talks were planned to take place later in Hansŏng, which might ease the situation. He also reported that Katō Kiyomasa had agreed to the princes’ proposal to dispatch Kim himself to the Joseon court to conduct negotiations. Kim was subsequently released ahead of the others and returned to the court.

=== Death ===
Nevertheless, senior officials called for punishment, citing both his failure to protect the princes and his return for conveying the Japanese desire for negotiations. Kim was therefore interrogated, but when Left State Councillor Yun Tusu spoke in his defense, King Seonjo ordered that he be sent into exile rather than imprisoned. Kim Kwiyŏng died on the 29th day, 5th month of 1593, while en route to exile at Hŭich'ŏn.
