= Hwang Hyŏk =

Korean scholar-official (1551–1612)

Prince Chagch'ŏn Hwang Hyŏk
- Born: 26th day, 9th month of 1551
- Died: 13th day, 4th month of 1612; Hansŏng, Joseon
- Cause of death: Torture
- Burial place: Paju, South Korea
- Citizenship: Joseon
- Occupation: Literati official
- Political party: Westerners

Korean name
- Hangul: 황혁
- Hanja: 黃赫
- RR: Hwang Hyeok
- MR: Hwang Hyŏk

Art name
- Hangul: 독석
- Hanja: 獨石
- RR: Dokseok
- MR: Toksŏk

Courtesy name
- Hangul: 회지
- Hanja: 晦之
- RR: Hoeji
- MR: Hoeji

Hwang Hyŏk (Korean: 황혁; Hanja: 黃赫; 26th day, 9th month of 1551 – 13th day, 4th month of 1612) was a Korean scholar-official of the mid-Joseon period. A member of the Jangsu Hwang clan, he was born to Hwang Chŏnguk, a high-ranking official later ennobled as Great Lord of Changgye. Through marriage, Hwang Hyŏk’s family became connected to the royal house, most notably through the marriage of his daughter to Prince Sunhwa, a son of King Seonjo.

Hwang Hyŏk studied under Ki Taesŭng and achieved first rank in the irregular civil service examination with an essay addressing principles of governance grounded in the Great Learning. Afterward, he held a range of central and provincial posts, including positions in the Office of the Inspector-General, the Royal Secretariat, and local magistracies. He was politically aligned with the Westerners faction and supported Yi I and Chŏng Ch'ŏl.

During the Imjin War, Hwang Hyŏk accompanied Prince Sunhwa during the escort of the royal princes northward. In 1592, he was captured in Hamgyŏng Province by Japanese forces and remained in captivity for nearly a year. While imprisoned, he composed letters under coercive circumstances, which later became the subject of official investigation following his release.

In the following years, Hwang Hyŏk was exiled in connection with disputes arising from his conduct during the war. In 1612, he was arrested in connection with the Kim Chikchae prison case, accused of treason, and interrogated under torture. He died in prison later that year. After the Injo Restoration of 1623, his conviction was overturned, and he was posthumously rehabilitated, promoted to Left Associate State Councilor, and granted the noble title Prince Changch'ŏn.

== Early life ==
=== Birth and family ===
Hwang Hyŏk was born on the 26th day, 9th month of 1551. He belonged to the Jangsu Hwang clan; his father, Hwang Chŏnguk, served in ministerial posts and was ennobled as Great Lord of Changgye, and his mother was a daughter of Cho Chŏn (조전; 趙詮) of the Sunchang Cho Clan.

Hwang Hyŏk's family established marital ties with the royal house on two occasions. The first marriage was concluded between Hwang Hyŏk and the daughter of Yun Ŏm (윤엄; 尹儼), a grandson of Princess Chŏngsuk. Lady Yun died on the 23rd day, 2nd month of 1576. Subsequently, Hwang Hyŏk remarried the daughter of Cho Chŏnggi (조정기; 趙廷機) of the Pungyang Cho clan. A daughter born of this marriage later married Prince Sunhwa, a son of King Seonjo, establishing a second marital connection between Hwang Hyŏk's family and the royal house.

=== Education ===
Hwang Hyŏk studied under Ki Taesŭng. At the age of twenty, he passed the preliminary civil service examination (사마시; 司馬試) in 1570, and in 1580 he sat for the irregular civil service examination (별시문과; 別試文科). In this examination, a question concerning contemporary governance was presented as the main topic. Hwang Hyŏk submitted an answer grounded in the Great Learning, in which he discussed principles for achieving order and good governance (치평지도; 治平之道), and was ranked first in the examination.

According to the Yŏllyŏsilgisul, an anecdote states that Hwang Hyŏk had not completed his answer by the end of the allotted examination time, prompting an examiner to petition King Seonjo for an extension. After being granted additional time, Hwang submitted his completed answer and was ultimately ranked first in the examination.

== Career during Seonjo reign ==
=== Official career ===
After passing the civil service examination in 1580, Hwang Hyŏk was appointed as Recorder (전적; 典籍) at the Royal Confucian Academy. He was subsequently transferred to the post of Magistrate of Chiksan. He subsequently served in both capital and provincial offices. His capital posts included Assistant Section Chief (좌랑; 佐郎) of the Ministry of Justice, Assistant Section Chief of the Ministry of Rites, Vice Director (첨정; 僉正) of the Office for Royal Sacrifices (봉상시; 奉常寺), Fourth Inspector (지평; 持平) at the Office of the Inspector-General, and Drafter of Royal Edicts. His provincial and local posts included Inspector (도사; 都事) of Hamgyŏng Province, Inspector of P'yŏngan Province, and Magistrate of Goyang.

In 1585, Hwang Hyŏk was dispatched as a Secret Royal Inspector to Chŏlla Right Province (전라우도; 全羅右道), where he apprehended the bandit Kim Kukpo (김국보; 金國寶) in Naju. In 1590, while serving as Chief Director (정; 正) of the Bureau of Court Music (장악원; 掌樂院), his father Hwang Chŏnguk was invested as a First-rank Kwangguk Merit Subject. On this occasion, Hwang Hyŏk attended the oath ceremony and was promoted to the senior third-rank title of Grand Master for Comprehensive Governance (통정대부; 通政大夫). He later served as Associate Councillor (첨지사; 僉知事) of the Privy Council (중추부; 中樞府), Chief Judge (판결사; 判決事) of the Bureau of Slaves (장례원; 掌禮院), Third Minister (참의; 參議) of Taxation, Sixth Royal Secretary (동부승지; 同副承旨) of the Royal Secretariat, and Right Royal Secretary (우승지; 右承旨).

=== Factional activities ===
Politically, Hwang Hyŏk was classified as a member of the Westerners faction and supported Yi I and Chŏng Ch'ŏl. In the 2nd month of 1584, while serving as Fourth Inspector at the Office of the Inspector-General, he submitted an impeachment against Yi Sunin, a close associate of Yi Pal, who was associated with the Easterners faction.

On the 2nd day, 10th month of 1589, Han Chun (한준; 韓準), then Governor of Hwanghae Province, together with others, submitted a secret memorial reporting that Chŏng Yŏrip was plotting treason, an action that marked the formal initiation of the Chŏng Yŏrip Affair. Chŏng Yŏrip committed suicide while fleeing, and on the 27th day of the same month, executions were carried out against those directly implicated in the treason plot. On the following day, however, Yang Chŏnhoe (양천회; 梁千會) submitted a memorial pointing out that members of the Easterners faction who had been closely associated with Chŏng Yŏrip had not been subjected to investigation. In the 11th month, further interrogations were conducted under the leadership of officials associated with the Westerners faction. In the course of this process, Hwang Hyŏk participated in the impeachment of Easterners figures including efforts to extend censure to Hong Yŏsun, who had previously recommended Chŏng Yŏrip. This attempt was blocked by King Seonjo, and Hwang was consequently dismissed from office.

In 1591, Chŏng Ch'ŏl fell from power after incurring King Seonjo's displeasure by proposing the formal investiture of a crown prince. This was followed by renewed discussions concerning responsibility for the 1589 treason case, resulting in the censure of Westerners faction officials. During this period, members of the Easterners faction argued that the Westerners had acted as a factional bloc and were responsible for political instability and wrongful accusations of treason. In the course of these events, Chŏng Ch'ŏl was placed under restricted residence within a fenced enclosure at Kanggye, and Hwang Hyŏk was stripped of his offices. During this period, proposals were raised to annul the marriage between Hwang Hyŏk's daughter and Prince Sunhwa. King Seonjo, however, declined to accept these demands.

== Imjin War ==
=== Escorting Prince Sunhwa ===
On the 13th day, 4th month of 1592, the Imjin War began. When news reached the Joseon court on the 17th day of the same month, King Seonjo dispatched Yi Il and appointed Sin Rip as Supreme Inspector (순변사; 巡邊使) of the Three Provinces. Yi Il and Sin Rip were subsequently defeated at the Battles of Sangju and Chungju, respectively. Upon receiving reports of Sin Rip's defeat on the 28th day, 4th month, King Seonjo decided to evacuate the capital.

In conjunction with the evacuation, King Seonjo dispatched the royal princes to various regions to mobilize loyalist forces, sending Prince Sunhwa to Kangwŏn Province. On the 29th day, 4th month, Han Chun and Yi Ki (이기; 李墍) were initially designated to escort Prince Sunhwa. On the following day, Hwang Hyŏk, the prince's father-in-law, volunteered to accompany him together with his father, Hwang Chŏnguk. Hwang Hyŏk was accordingly appointed as a Military Protector (호군; 護軍) and assigned to escort Prince Sunhwa.

While moving through Kangwŏn Province, Hwang Hyŏk's party learned that Japanese forces had entered the region and altered their route northward. Passing through Hoeyang, Ch'ujiryŏng Pass (추지령; 楸地嶺), and T'ongch'ŏn, he reached Anbyŏn in Hamgyŏng Province and joined the entourage of Prince Imhae. Thereafter, the group continued to retreat northward to evade the forces of Katō Kiyomasa, who were pursuing the two princes. On the 18th day, 7th month, after learning of Han Kŭkham's defeat at the Battle of Haejŏngch'ang, the group proceeded to Hoeryŏng.

=== Captivity ===
On the 23rd day, 7th month of 1592, Kuk Kyŏngin instigated a rebellion at Hoeryŏng, during which the entourages of Prince Imhae and Prince Sunhwa were taken captive. In the course of this incident, Hwang Hyŏk was also captured, together with Hwang Chŏnguk, Kim Kwiyŏng, and others. On the following day, they were handed over to Katō Kiyomasa, who had arrived at Hoeryŏng, and were subsequently confined in earthen caves at Anbyŏn while accompanying the Japanese forces. During his captivity, Hwang Hyŏk attempted suicide but abandoned the attempt after being dissuaded by the princes.

On the 19th day, 10th month, Yi Hongŏp (이홍업; 李弘業), who had been released earlier, delivered to the Joseon court letters written by Hwang Hyŏk in the names of civil officials, letters by military officials such as Han Kŭkham and Yi Yŏng (이영; 李瑛), as well as a letter from Katō Kiyomasa. The letter by civil officials conveyed proposals concerning peace negotiations, including a plan to divide the border with Joseon.

On the 13th day, 3rd month of 1593, while Katō Kiyomasa and the captives were withdrawing from Hamgyŏng Province and stationed in Hansŏng, Kim Ch'ŏnil dispatched Yi Sinch'ung (이신충; 李藎忠) to the Japanese camp to reconnoiter conditions. In the course of this mission, Katō demanded that the princes compose a letter expressing an intention to negotiate peace. When Hwang Chŏnguk refused, the Japanese forces killed Hwang Hyŏk's eight-year-old son (identified in some sources as his grandson) and threatened the lives of the princes. Under these circumstances, Hwang Hyŏk composed the letter in accordance with Japanese demands. Separately, Hwang Chŏnguk prepared a memorial written in Hangul, explaining that the letter had been written under duress and reporting the actual situation.

Yi Sinch'ung received a bundle of documents from Katō Kiyomasa, which included a letter addressed to a Ming general, reply letters from the two princes, a letter written in Hangul, and letters bearing the names of Hwang Hyŏk and his father. However, the Hangul letter was not forwarded, and only the document prepared in compliance with Japanese demands was transmitted to the Joseon court through Yu Sŏngnyong. Upon presenting these materials to King Seonjo, Yu Sŏngnyong reported that, in his judgment, the wording of the letters raised serious concerns.

Following peace negotiations between the Ming and Japan, Japanese forces withdrew from Hansŏng in the 4th month of 1593. Hwang Hyŏk likewise moved south and arrived in Busan around the 6th month of the same year. On the 22nd day, 7th month of 1593, he was released together with the two princes.

== Final years ==
=== Exile ===
Hwang Hyŏk came under investigation in connection with memorial reports he had written during his captivity. The investigation focused on two points: first, that a letter delivered by Yi Hongŏp referred to peace negotiations involving the division of Joseon territory; and second, that the document bearing the names of Hwang Hyŏk and his father, which Yi Sinch'ung delivered, omitted any language identifying the authors as subjects of Joseon and instead referred to Toyotomi Hideyoshi as “Kwanbaek Chŏnha” (관백 전하; 關白 殿下; 'His Highness Toyotomi Hideyoshi').

According to the Veritable Records of the Joseon Dynasty, Hwang Hyŏk explained during the investigation that references to peace negotiations reflected the Japanese position rather than his own, and that both the absence of deferential expressions such as “your subject” and the use of the term “Kwanbaek Chŏnha” resulted from what he described as the transmission of a forged document intended to mislead the Japanese forces. Despite this explanation, the court ordered Hwang Hyŏk's exile to Isan. Hwang Hyŏk spent seven years in exile at Isan and was subsequently transferred to Sinch'ŏn in 1599.

=== Kim Chikchae prison case ===
On the 24th day, 3rd month of 1612, Hwang Hyŏk was arrested after being implicated in what became known as the Kim Chikchae prison case (김직재의 옥; 金直哉의 獄). The affair originated in the 2nd month of the same year, when Sin Yul, then Magistrate of Pongsan County, compelled Kim Kyŏngnip (김경립; 金景立)—who had been arrested on charges of forging documents of the Ministry of War—to make accusations against other individuals. As a result, Kim Kyŏngnip accused Kim Chikchae and his son Kim Paekham (김백함; 金白緘) of plotting treason. Under torture, Kim Paekham confessed that they had intended to enthrone Prince Chillŭng, the adopted son of Prince Sunhwa, as king.

Sin Yul further drew Yu P'aengsŏk (유팽석; 柳彭石) into the case and, as the scope of the investigation expanded, implicated Hwang Hyŏk as well, with whom he was reported to have had prior conflicts. At the time, Yi Ich'ŏm, serving as Inspector General (대사헌; 大司憲) at the Office of the Inspector-General, together with King Gwanghaegun, concluded that Hwang Hyŏk was likely involved in treason, citing his status as Prince Sunhwa's father-in-law and his residence in Sinch'ŏn. On this basis, Hwang Hyŏk was prosecuted on charges of treason.

=== Death ===
Hwang Hyŏk was imprisoned on the 24th day, 3rd month of 1612. During the investigation, members of his family and associates, including his younger brother and grandson, were also subjected to interrogation. After undergoing three rounds of torture, Hwang Hyŏk died in prison on the 13th day, 4th month of 1612.

In the 3rd month of the 1623, shortly after the Injo Restoration, it was officially determined that Hwang Hyŏk had died wrongfully in prison as a result of false accusations, and a posthumous appeasement rite was conducted. He was subsequently reinstated posthumously, promoted to the rank of Left Associate State Councilor (좌찬성; 左贊成), and ennobled as Prince Changch'ŏn (장천군; 長川君). Hwang Hyŏk's tomb is located beneath that of his father, Hwang Chŏnguk, in Paju.
