= Prince Sunhwa =

Korean prince (1580–1607)

- Born: 16 November 1580; Hanyang, Joseon
- Died: 14 April 1607 (aged 26); Hanyang, Joseon
- Burial: Namyangju, South Korea
- Spouse: Princess Consort of Jangsu Hwang clan
- Issue: Yi Gye-yeo; Prince Chillŭng (adopted); Prince Haean (adopted); Yi Eob-yi; Yi Jung-yi
- Dynasty: House of Yi
- Father: Seonjo
- Mother: Royal Noble Consort Sun of the Gimhae Kim clan

Korean name
- Hangul: 이보
- Hanja: 李𤣰
- RR: I Bo
- MR: I Po

Royal title
- Hangul: 순화군
- Hanja: 順和君
- RR: Sunhwagun
- MR: Sunhwagun

Posthumous name
- Hangul: 희민
- Hanja: 僖敏
- RR: Huimin
- MR: Hŭimin

Prince Sunhwa (Korean: 순화군; Hanja: 順和君; 1580 – 18th day, 3rd month of 1607), personal name Yi Po (Korean: 이보; Hanja: 李𤣰), was a Korean prince, as the sixth son of King Seonjo, and his concubine, Royal Noble Consort Sun of the Gimhae Kim clan.

During the Imjin War, Prince Sunhwa was dispatched to Kangwŏn Province as part of the royal court's efforts to mobilize local forces. At the age of thirteen, he traveled with an official entourage that included Hwang Chŏnguk, Hwang Hyŏk, and Yi Ki. He later proceeded northward into Hamgyŏng Province, where he joined Prince Imhae.

In the same year, both princes were captured during a local uprising and subsequently handed over to Japanese forces; their captivity later became an issue in diplomatic negotiations. Prince Sunhwa remained in captivity until 1593, when he was released in the course of peace discussions between Ming China and Japan. He returned to the Joseon court later that year.

In the years following his repatriation, he was repeatedly accused of serious criminal acts, including homicide and sexual offenses, as recorded in the Veritable Records of the Joseon Dynasty. These incidents led to his exile, confinement, and the formal revocation of his princely title in 1601. Prince Sunhwa died in 1607. After his death, his title was restored, and he was posthumously honored with the name Hŭimin. His tomb was established in Namyangju.

== Early life ==
Prince Sunhwa was born on November 16, 1580 (on the 10th day, of the 10th month of 1580 in Lunar calendar). He was the sixth son of King Seonjo (r. 1567–1608), the 14th monarch of the Joseon dynasty. His mother was Royal Noble Consort Sun of the Gimhae Kim clan, and he was her only child. According to the Veritable Records of the Joseon Dynasty, King Seonjo characterized Prince Sunhwa as having exhibited a cruel disposition from an early age, recording that he took pleasure in killing birds and animals.

Prince Sunhwa married a daughter of Hwang Hyŏk of the Jangsu Hwang clan and had one daughter by his principal wife, but later adopted two relatives; a great-grandson of Grand Internal Prince Deokheung and the second son of his younger half-brother, Prince Inseong. He also had two daughters by his concubine.

== Imjin War ==
=== Dispatch to Kangwon Province ===
The Imjin War broke out on the 13th day of the 4th month of 1592, and news of the war reached the court on the 17th day of the same month. King Seonjo dispatched Yi Il and appointed Sin Rip as Supreme Inspector (순변사; 巡邊使) of the Three Provinces. However, after Yi Il reported the enemy's numerical superiority on the 21st day of the 4th month, the king summoned the princes—including Prince Sunhwa—and members of the royal family into the palace and began preparations for flight. When news arrived on the 27th day that Yi Il had been defeated, followed on the 28th day by reports of Sin Rip's defeat at Chungju, King Seonjo made the final decision to abandon the capital.

In conjunction with the royal flight, King Seonjo dispatched two princes to different regions to recruit loyalist forces: Prince Imhae was sent to Hamgyŏng Province, and Prince Sunhwa to Kangwŏn Province. At the time, Prince Sunhwa was thirteen years old. Regarding the background to this decision, historian Shin Myung-Ho has suggested that King Seonjo's personal affections may have influenced the deployment of the princes. Specifically, he argues that the king favored Royal Noble Consort In of the Suwon Kim clan and her son Prince Sinsŏng, retaining them near the royal entourage, whereas Prince Sunhwa, who is described as having enjoyed comparatively less favor, was dispatched to Kangwŏn Province.

On the 29th day of the 4th month of 1592, Han Chun (한준; 韓準) and Yi Ki (이기; 李墍) were initially selected to escort Prince Sunhwa. However, on the following day, according to the Veritable Records of the Joseon Dynasty, Hwang Hyŏk—Prince Sunhwa's father-in-law—and his father Hwang Chŏnguk offered to accompany the prince. Consequently, Hwang Chŏnguk was appointed Recruitment Commissioner (호소사; 號召使), and Hwang Hyŏk was appointed Military Protector (호군; 護軍) to accompany Prince Sunhwa, while Han Chun was ordered to return. Prince Sunhwa departed for Kangwŏn Province at dawn on the 30th day of the 4th month together with Hwang Chŏnguk, Hwang Hyŏk, Yi Ki, and others.

The prince's entourage passed through Yangju, crossed Ch'uksŏngnyŏng Pass (축석령; 祝石嶺), and reached Chorwon, recruiting loyalist forces throughout the Kangwŏn region. After receiving reports that Japanese forces had entered Kangwŏn Province, they altered their route northward, passing through Hoeyang, Ch'ujiryŏng Pass (추지령; 楸地嶺), and T'ongch'ŏn before arriving at Anbyŏn in Hamgyŏng Province, where they joined the entourage of Prince Imhae. Meanwhile, Katō Kiyomasa occupied Hamhŭng on the 24th day of the 6th month of 1592 and, upon learning from local inhabitants that the two princes were moving northward, began to pursue them. When Katō's forces crossed Mach'ŏllyŏng Pass (마천령; 摩天嶺) on the 18th day of the 7th month, the entourages of Prince Sunhwa and Prince Imhae moved toward Kyŏngsŏng. After learning of Han Kŭkham's defeat at the Battle of Haejŏngch'ang, they took refuge in Hoeryŏng.

=== Captivity ===
While remaining in Hamgyŏng Province, Prince Sunhwa, together with Prince Imhae, mobilized their retainers to requisition goods from private households, actions that reportedly caused resentment among the local population. On the 23rd day of the 7th month of 1592, Kuk Kyŏngin launched a rebellion at Hoeryŏng, surrounding the guesthouse and taking Prince Sunhwa and Prince Imhae captive, along with Joseon officials and their families, including Kim Kwiyŏng, Hwang Chŏnguk, Hwang Hyŏk, and Yi Yŏng (이영; 李瑛). On the following day, the captured princes and their entourage were handed over to Katō Kiyomasa upon his arrival at Hoeryŏng and were subsequently confined in earthen caves in the Anbyŏn area.

As news of the princes' capture reached the Joseon court, the repatriation of Prince Sunhwa and Prince Imhae became a significant issue in the Ming–Japanese peace negotiations. On the 5th day of the 2nd month of 1593, a Ming delegation led by Feng Zhongying (馮仲纓) demanded, in conjunction with the Japanese withdrawal from Hamgyŏng Province, the return of the captured princes, including Prince Sunhwa. Katō Kiyomasa, however, refused this demand and insisted that further discussions be conducted in Hansŏng. Thereafter, on the 29th day of the same month, Katō transported the princes and their entourage to Hansŏng.

In the 4th month of that year, following the Yongsan talks between Shen Weijing and Konishi Yukinaga, the Japanese forces began withdrawing from Hansŏng. In this process, Toyotomi Hideyoshi permitted the repatriation of Prince Sunhwa and Prince Imhae as one of the conditions for peace. Katō Kiyomasa did not comply with this order and attempted to transfer the princes to Japan. Beginning on the 28th day of the 4th month, Katō led Prince Sunhwa and his entourage southward.

On the 15th day of the 5th month of 1593, at a meeting held in Nagoya between a Ming envoy delegation and Toyotomi Hideyoshi, Hideyoshi presented peace terms that included the repatriation of Prince Sunhwa and Prince Imhae by the 28th day of the 6th month, and ordered Katō to hand the princes over to Shen Weijing. Accordingly, Prince Sunhwa and Prince Imhae were released on the 22nd day of the 7th month and arrived in Hansŏng on the 6th day of the 8th month of the same year.

== Final years ==
=== Misconduct ===
Prince Sunhwa was impeached by the Office of the Inspector-General and the Office of the Censor-General on charges that included murder, assault, and plunder. According to the Veritable Records of the Joseon Dynasty, in the 3rd month of 1599 Prince Sunhwa killed a neighboring resident, and in the 7th month of 1600 he raped one of his mother's female servants at a mourning hut beside the royal coffin hall. In response, King Seonjo ordered Prince Sunhwa into exile at Suwon, while the female servant involved in the case was subjected to two rounds of corporal interrogation by the Royal Treasury (내수사; 內需司) and subsequently exiled to a remote island.

Prince Sunhwa continued to be implicated in acts of murder and violence while in exile at Suwon. Consequently, on the 8th day of the 10th month of 1600, King Seonjo ordered stricter supervision of Prince Sunhwa's conduct, and two days later transferred him to Hansŏng, where he was placed under house arrest. In 1601, his princely title was formally revoked. In the 5th month of 1604, Prince Sunhwa committed another act of murder and was confined to the residence of Yi Sujun (이수준; 李壽俊), Chief Director (정; 正) at the Office of the Royal Stables (사복시; 司僕寺) on the 3rd day, 10th month of 1604. Even after suffering a stroke, he caused further controversy in 1606 by ordering his servants to bind and beat his maternal uncle, the younger brother of Royal Noble Consort Sun of the Gimhae Kim clan, for which he was again censured.

=== Death ===
Prince Sunhwa died on the April 14th, 1607 (on the 18th day of the 3rd month of 1607 in lunar calendar) at the age of 26. The court historiographer of the Veritable Records of the Joseon Dynasty recorded in his obituary that Prince Sunhwa had "killed more than ten people each year." After his death, his princely title was restored, and he was posthumously reinstated as Prince Sunhwa; his tomb was established in Namyangju. On the 3rd day of the 3rd month of 1778, he was posthumously granted the honorific title 'Hŭimin' (희민; 僖敏).

== Family ==
- Father - Seonjo of Joseon (선조; 6 December 1552 – 16 March 1608)
  - Grandfather - Grand Internal Prince Deokheung (덕흥대원군; 2 April 1530 – 14 June 1559)
  - Grandmother - Grand Internal Princess Consort Hadong of the Hadong Jeong clan (하동부대부인 하동 정씨; 23 September 1522 – 24 June 1567)
- Mother - Concubine Sun (순빈) of the Gimhae Kim clan (김해 김씨; 1565–1647)
  - Grandfather - Kim Bok-jang (김복장, 金福長)
  - Grandmother - Lady Shin of the Pyeongsan Shin clan (평산 신씨)
- Consorts and their issue(s):
  - Princess Consort of the Jangsu Hwang clan (군부인 장수 황씨; 1582–1645); eldest daughter of Hwang Hyeok (황혁; 1551–1612)
    - Daughter - Yi Gye-yeo (이계여, 李桂餘; 1598–?)
    - Adoptive Son - Yi Tae-gyeong, Prince Jinreung (진릉군 이태경; 1594–1612)
    - Adoptive Son - Yi Yeok, Prince Haean (해안군 이억; 1613–1655)
  - Cheon-deok (천덕, 天德; 1585–?)
    - Daughter - Yi Eob-yi (이업이, 李業伊; 1601—?)
    - Daughter - Yi Jung-yi (이중이, 李衆伊; 1603–1609)
