= Kuk Kyŏngin =

Joseon rebel leader (?–1592)

- 국경인
- Born: Unknown; Chŏnju, Joseon
- Died: 1592; Hoeryŏng, Joseon
- Cause of death: Execution
- Citizenship: Joseon
- Criminal charges: Rebellion
- Criminal penalty: Decapitation
- Relatives: Kuk Sep'il (uncle)

Korean name
- Hangul: 국경인
- Hanja: 鞠景仁
- RR: Guk Gyeongin
- MR: Kuk Kyŏngin

Kuk Kyŏngin (Korean: 국경인; Hanja: 鞠景仁; died in 1592) was a Korean rebel that opposed Joseon during the Imjin War.

Kuk, originally from Chŏnju, was exiled to Hoeryŏng, where he held administrative roles but harbored deep resentment toward the central government. During the early phase of the Imjin War, he declared himself commander, incited a rebellion with over 5,000 followers, and detained Prince Imhae and Sunhwa along with their entourage. On 24th day, 7th month of 1592, Kuk surrendered the royal hostages to Katō Kiyomasa, securing control over Hoeryŏng in return and proclaiming himself Military Commander of Northern Hamgyŏng Province. After Chŏng Munbu recaptured Kyŏngsŏng from Kuk Sep'il, he called on Kuk Kyŏngin to surrender and support the loyalist cause. Kuk refused and instead prepared an assault on Kyŏngsŏng in alliance with Japanese troops, prompting Chŏng to issue a proclamation for his execution. Kuk Kyŏngin was ultimately ambushed and killed by Sin Sejun.

== Exile and Services in Hoeryŏng ==
Kuk Kyŏngin, originally from Chŏnju, was exiled to Hoeryŏng in Hamgyŏng Province following a criminal conviction. While the specific charge remains unclear, some scholars posit that his exile may have been connected to Chŏng Yŏrip's rebellion, as it occurred before the outbreak of the Imjin War and his Chŏnju origin.

During his exile in Hoeryŏng, Kuk served in an official capacity—as a local functionary (achŏn) and as an indigenous administrator (togwan chinmu). Despite these services, he reportedly harbored deep resentment toward the central government for his banishment.

== Imjin War and Rebellion ==
Following the outbreak of the Imjin War, the Second Division of Katō Kiyomasa's army advanced steadily into Hamgyŏng Province. In response, Prince Imhae and Prince Sunhwa, who had been dispatched to raise royalist forces, fled northward to evade the Japanese army. On 21st day, 7th month of 1592, they arrived at Hoeryŏng, where Kuk Kyŏngin was stationed. Learning that Japanese troops were approaching, the princes sought to continue their escape northward. However, the local militia (tobyŏng) under Kuk's command blocked their departure under the pretext of defending the fortress.

The following day, Kuk declared himself commander and initiated a rebellion, rallying more than 5,000 individuals who shared his discontent with the royal court. Yu Kyŏngch'ŏn, magistrate of Koryŏng, conspired with Yi Yŏng, the Provincial Military Commander of Southern Hamgyŏng, and Mun Mongwŏn, magistrate of Hoeryŏng, to pacify Kuk, but their efforts failed: Mun and Yi were captured, and Yu managed to escape. Kuk's uprising was soon joined by other revolts across the region: in Kyŏngsŏng, his uncle Kuk Sep'il launched a rebellion, and in Myŏngch'ŏn, Chŏng Malsu also took up arms in concert with the insurrection.

Kuk's forces surrounded the royal guesthouse, detaining the two princes, their consorts, and their attendants, including Kim Kwiyŏng, Hwang Chŏnguk, and Hwang Hyŏk. On 24th day, 7th month of 1592, when Katō Kiyomasa arrived in Hoeryŏng, Kuk surrendered the royal entourage to him. In return, Kuk was granted control over the Hoeryŏng area. He subsequently declared himself Military Commander of Northern Hamgyŏng Province and assumed authority over the region.

== Execution ==
After retaking Kyŏngsŏng, previously under the control of Kuk Sep'il, Chŏng Munbu attempted to persuade Kuk Kyŏngin to surrender and to dispatch righteous army (ŭibyŏng) troops in support of the loyalist cause. Kuk, however, refused and instead begun preparing an assault on Kyŏngsŏng in coordination with Japanese forces stationed in Kilju. In response, Chŏng Munbu issued a proclamation calling for the execution of Kuk Kyŏngin and his fellow rebels.

Upon reading the proclamation, the Confucian scholar O Yunjŏk, concerned for the safety of his family, resolved to assassinate Kuk before any harm could befall them. However, the plot was exposed, and Kuk ordered his subordinates Yi Ŏnu and Chŏn Ŏn'guk to arrest O. On the following day, as Kuk attempted to carry out a public execution of O Yunjŏk, he was ambushed by Sin Sejun. Kuk was beaton to death along with his close aides Yi Ŏnu and Chŏn Ŏn'guk, Their severed heads were subsequently delivered to Chŏng Munbu.

== See also ==
- Hamgyong campaign
- Pukkwan campaign
