= Cheong Wa Dae Chunchugwan =

Chunchugwan
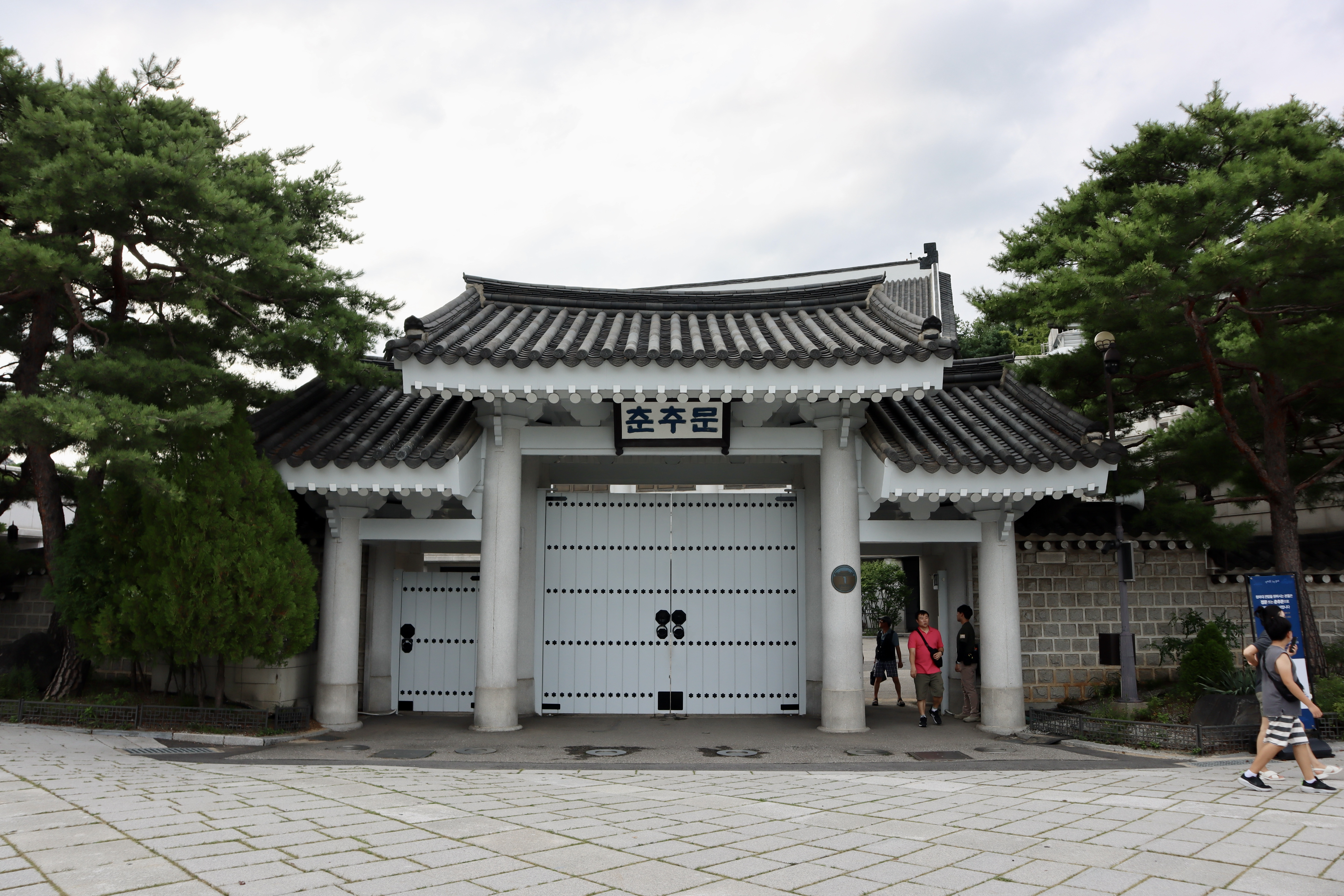
- The gate Chunchumun
- Interactive map of the Chunchugwan area

General information
- Architectural style: Traditional Korean
- Location: 1 Cheongwadae-ro, Jongno-gu, Seoul, South Korea, Seoul, South Korea
- Coordinates: 37.5867°N 126.9763°E
- Opened: 29 September 1990

Technical details
- Floor count: 3 floors above ground, 1 basement

Korean name
- Hangul: 춘추관
- Hanja: 春秋館
- RR: Chunchugwan
- MR: Ch'unch'ugwan

Cheong Wa Dae Chunchugwan (Korean: 청와대 춘추관) is an annex facility that serves as the press center of Cheong Wa Dae, South Korean presidential office. It is used as a venue for the president's press conferences and the Cheong Wa Dae spokesperson's regular briefings, and as a press room for reporters.

== Overview ==
Cheong Wa Dae Chunchugwan is a press center that opened in 1990, a year before the completion of the new main building. It site within the main building's eastern grounds, and is a modern Korean-style building with a gable roof and earthenware tiles, comprising three stories above ground and one basement level. There is a press room on the first floor, a briefing room and cafeteria on the second floor, and staff rooms on the third floor.

The name originated from Chunchugwan and Yemun Chunchugwan (예문춘추관), which were in charge of recording history during the Goryeo and Joseon Dynasties. It contains the meaning of recording history completely and pursuing the spirit of journalism.

The regular Cheong Wa Dae press briefing is conducted by the Spokesperson in the briefing room on the second floor, starting at 2:30 PM on weekdays. Briefings, including a Q&A session, last approximately 20 to 30 minutes. While both domestic and international reporters covering the office are welcome to attend, questions may only be submitted in Korean upon designation by the Spokesperson. Questions regarding embargoed matters may be asked after the broadcast.

== History ==
Until its completion in 1990, only eleven media outlets were permitted to cover the Cheong Wa Dae; Many new media outlets and regional newspapers faced restrictions on their access to the office. Following the inauguration of the Roh Tae-woo administration, construction of the press center began in accordance with a promise to open the office to media outlets.

Construction on Chunchugwan began on May 10, 1989, and was completed on September 29, 1990, after 16 months. The construction cost was 7.9 billion won. The opening ceremony was held on the morning of the 29th, attended by President Roh, government officials, and members of the media. After Chunchugwan's opening, more domestic and foreign media outlets were able to cover Cheong Wa Dae.

== Gallery ==
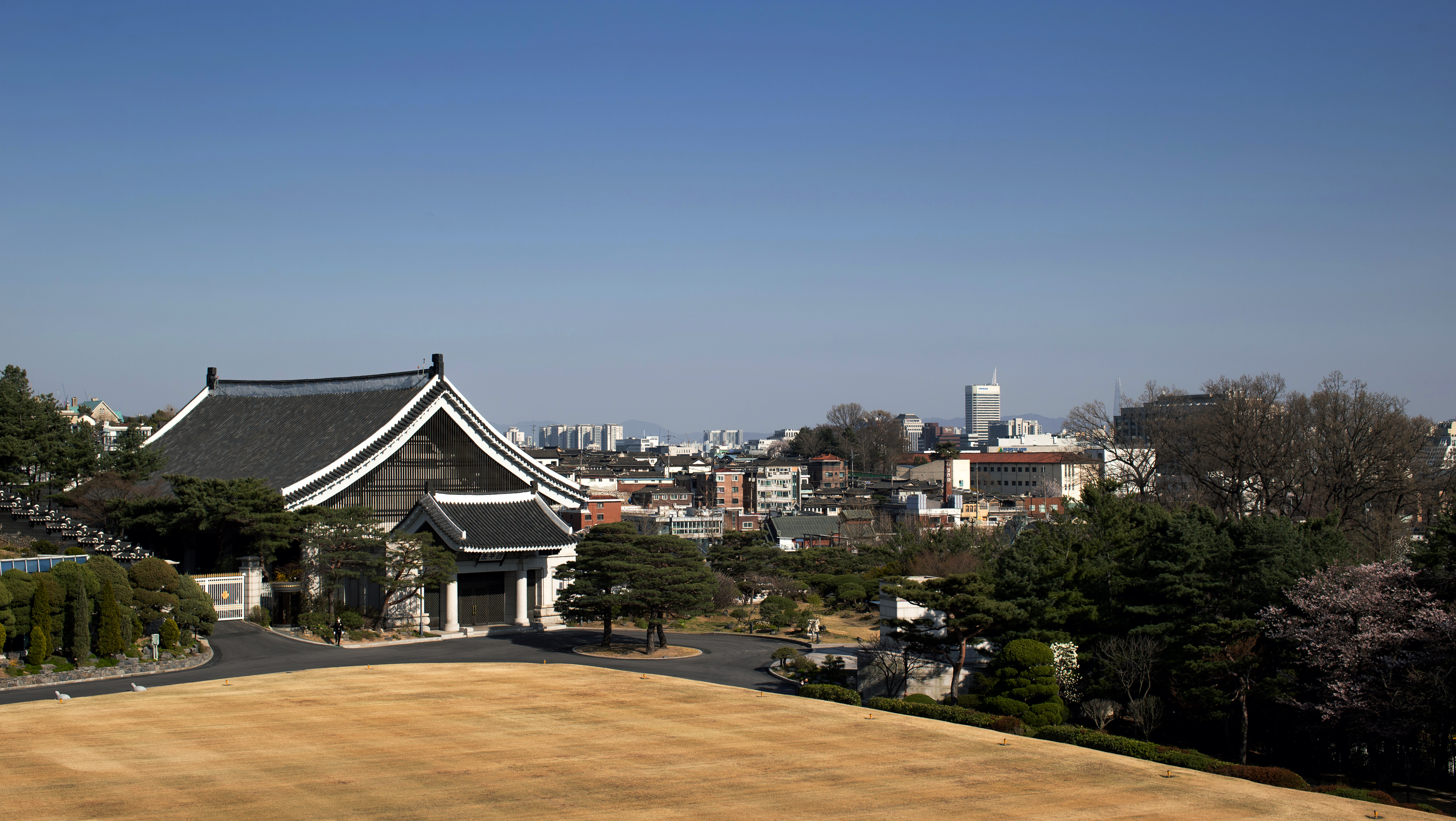
Chunchugwan

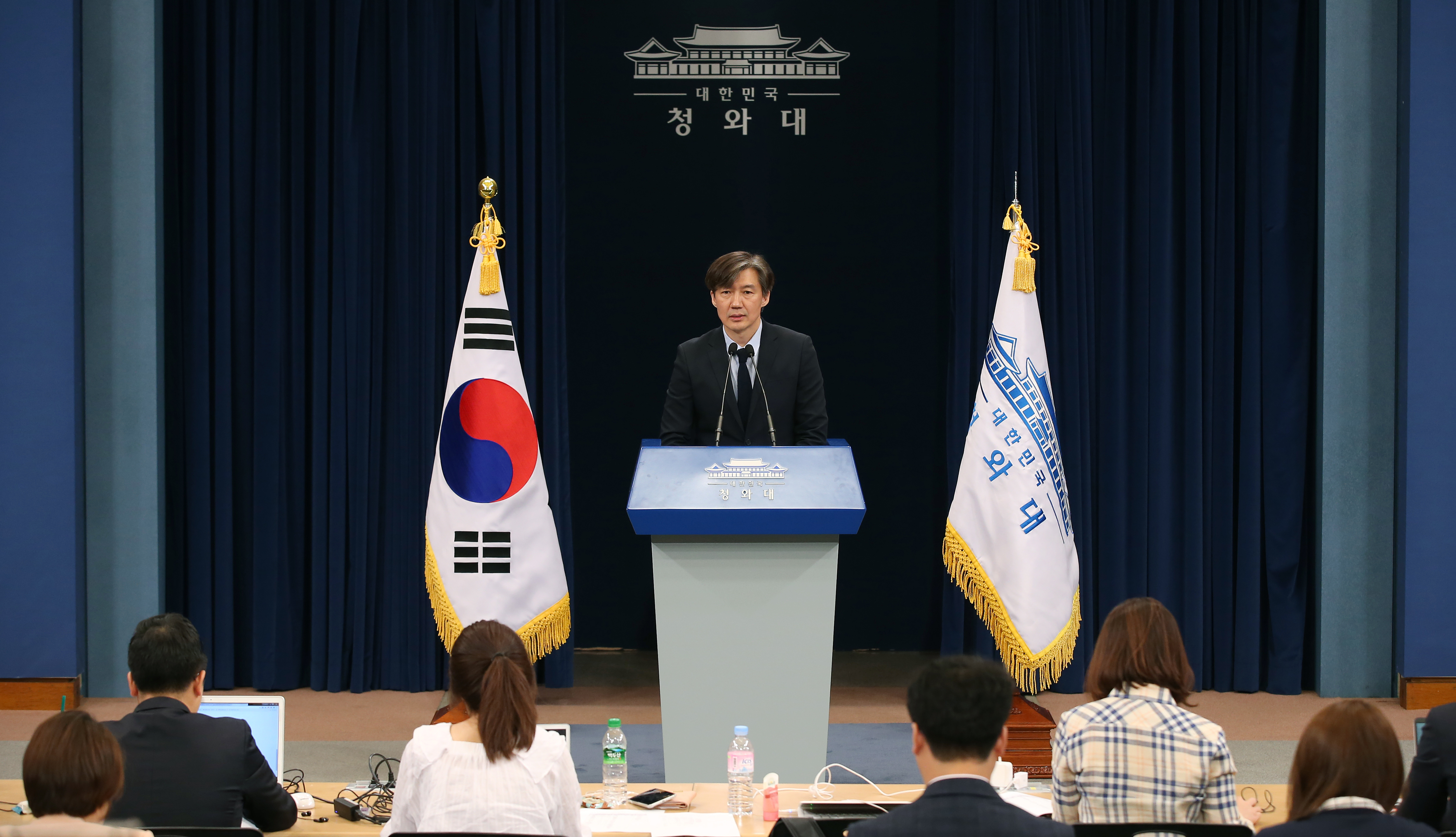
Cheong Wa Dae Press Briefing

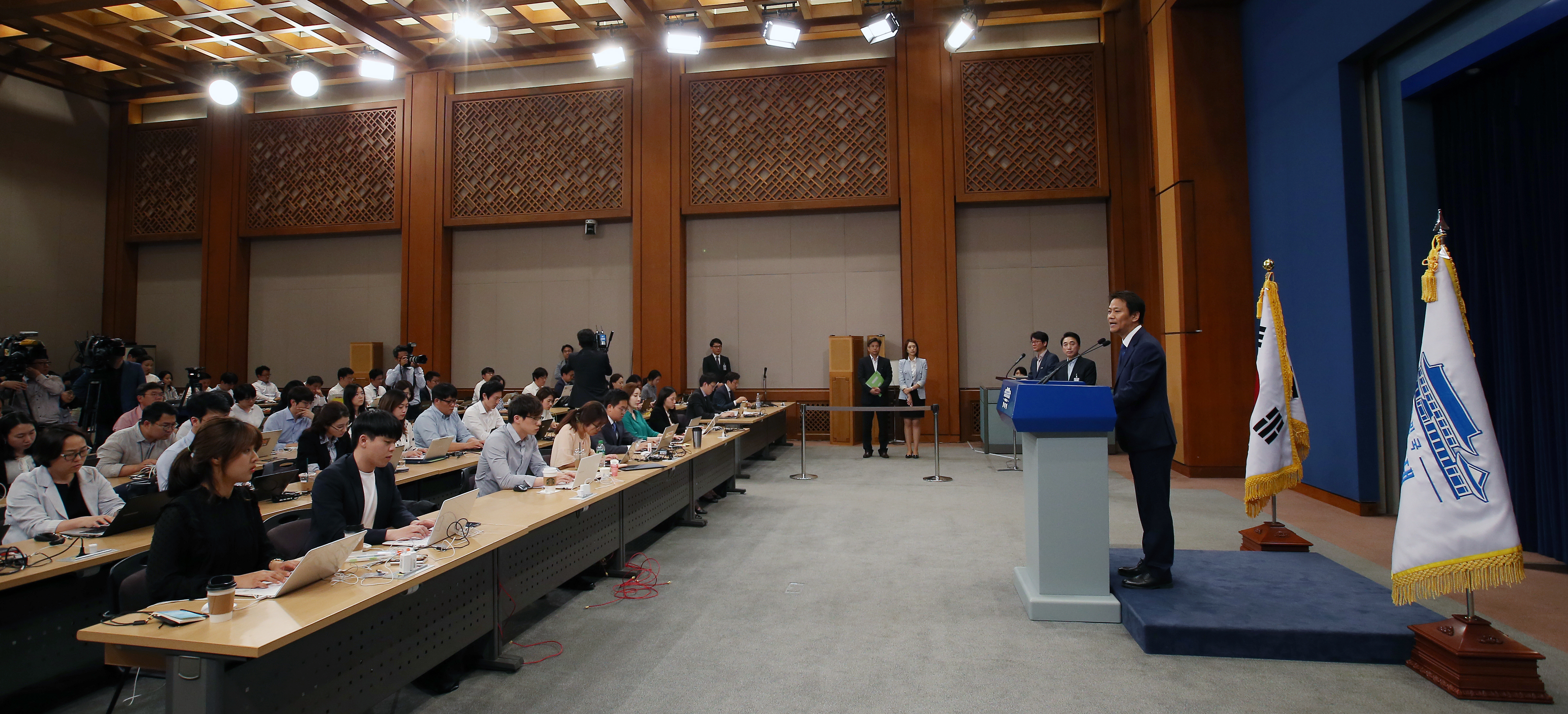
2nd floor briefing room
