= Yangcheon Heo clan =

Korean clan from Seoul

- Country: Korea
- Current region: Gangseo District, Seoul
- Founder: Hŏ Sŏnmun
- Connected members: Kim Bo-sung; Huh Gak; Hur Kyoung-min; Hŏ Kyun; Heo Nanseolheon; Hŏ Mok; Huh Young-man; Hur Jae; Hŏ Chŏk; Huh Jung-moo; Heo Jun; Heo Seung; Hur Woong
- Website: heo.or.kr

Yangcheon Heo clan (Korean: 양천 허씨; Hanja: 陽川 許氏) was one of the Korean clans. Their bon-gwan was in Gangseo District, Seoul. According to the 2015 Korean census, the number of Yangcheon Heo clan is 149,505. Their founder was Hŏ Sŏnmun. He was the descendant of Heo Hwang-ok, the wife of Suro, first king of the Geumgwan Gaya. Hŏ Sŏnmun had assisted Taejo of Goryeo in his defeat of Kyŏn Hwŏn by offering resources.

== See also ==
- Korean clan names of foreign origin
