= Hamgyong campaign =

1592 campaign of the Japanese invasion of Korea

Hamgyeong campaign
- Part of Imjin War
Date	July – October 1592
Location	Hamgyeong, Korea
Result	Japanese occupation of Hamgyeong; Japanese withdraw from Jurchen territory Japanese capture of two Korean princes

Belligerents
Japan	Joseon	Orangai (Jurchens)

Commanders and leaders
Katō Kiyomasa; Nabeshima Naoshige	Han Kŭkham (POW)	?

Strength
20,000; 3,000 Korean defectors	?	~10,000

Casualties and losses
?	?	?

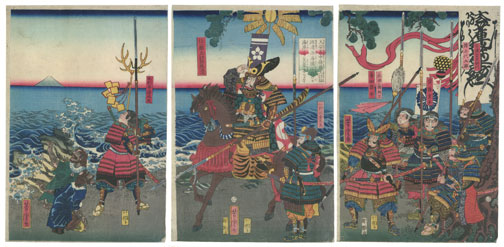
Katō Kiyomasa in Korea.

The Hamgyong campaign, also known as Katō Kiyomasa's northern campaign, was Kiyomasa's invasion of Hamgyeong Province, the northeastern region of Joseon (now Korea) during the Imjin War.

The campaign was largely due to the assistance of Korean defectors, who also handed over to the Japanese their princes, Sunhwa and Imhae. The Japanese reached the northeastern edge of Hamgyeong, crossed the Tumen River into Manchuria, and attacked the Orangai clan of Jurchens, but met with heavy resistance. Katō returned south and took up residence in Anbyeon, while Nabeshima Naoshige headquartered in Gilju. By winter, local resistance began pushing back at the Japanese occupation and laid siege to Gilju.

== Campaign ==
Katō Kiyomasa and Nabeshima Naoshige invaded Hamgyeong with a force of 20,000 following the taking of Gaeseong.

Both the South Army Commander and provincial governor of Hamgyeong fled without any resistance.

The Japanese met their first real resistance at Haejungchang, a warehouse near Gilju. The North Army Commander, Han Kŭkham, led an attack on the Japanese and forced them to take shelter in the warehouse. He then advanced on their position but was unable to take the fortified warehouse in the face of massed matchlock fire. They retreated into a nearby mountain cave, where they would later be caught in an ambush by the Japanese that night. The Japanese fired on them, and once they panicked, went in and cut them down. Han managed to escape, only to be caught by Korean defectors who handed him over to the Japanese.

Katō marched further north and was received by Korean defectors, who handed over the two Korean princes, Imhae and Sunhwa. Katō then crossed the Tumen with 8000 troops and 3000 Korean defectors into the territory of the Orangai Jurchens. He proceeded to take a relatively undefended fortress. The next day, nearly 10,000 Jurchens attacked the Japanese but withdrew after a heavy downpour started blowing in their direction. Katō quickly retreated across the Tumen and moved south to Anbyeon, where he wrote back to Toyotomi Hideyoshi.
