= Hŏ Nansŏrhŏn =

Korean painter and poet (1563–1589)

- Hangul: 허초희
- Hanja: 許楚姬
- RR: Heo Chohui
- MR: Hŏ Ch'ohŭi

Art name
- Hangul: 허난설헌
- Hanja: 許蘭雪軒
- RR: Heo Nanseolheon
- MR: Hŏ Nansŏrhŏn

Hŏ Nansŏrhŏn (Korean: 허난설헌; Hanja: 許蘭雪軒; 1563 – March 19, 1589), was a Korean painter and poet of the mid-Joseon dynasty. She was the younger sister of Hŏ Pong, a politician and political writer, and elder sister to Hŏ Kyun, a prominent writer of the time and credited as the author of The Tale of Hong Gildong. Her own writings consisted of some two hundred poems written in Chinese verse (hanshi), and two poems written in hangul (though her authorship of the hangul poems is contested).

== Biography ==
=== Early life ===
Before being known as Hŏ Nansŏrhŏn, Lady Hŏ was known by her name Hŏ Ch'ohŭi (허초희; 許楚姬) or Hŏ Okhye (허옥혜; 許玉惠). Lady Hŏ was born in Gangneung to a prominent political family (yangban). Her father, Hŏ Yŏp, was from the Yangcheon Hŏ clan who was a distinguished scholar and her mother was his second wife, Lady Kim of the Gangneung Kim clan.

His second marriage in 1548 was to the only daughter of a political minister, who mothered Nansŏrhŏn and her two brothers.

His first wife, Lady Han of the Cheongju Han clan, was the fourth daughter of Han Sukch'ang, who yielded four daughters and six sons. His father-in-law, Han Sukch'ang, was a great-grandson of Han Hwak (the father of Princess Consort Jeongseon and Queen Sohye), and the maternal cousin of Queen Janggyeong.

While her father was a Confucian and conservative official who subscribed tightly to the belief of namjon-yubi ("men above, women below"), it fell to her elder brother, Hŏ Pong, to recognize her budding talent and curiosity and introduce her to literature.

From an early age, she became recognized as a prodigal poet, though due to her position as a woman she was incapable of entering into a position of distinguishment. Her early piece, "Inscriptions on the Ridge Pole of the White Jade Pavilion in the Kwanghan Palace" (Kwanghanjeon Paegongnu sangnangmun), produced at the age of eight, was lauded as a work of poetic genius and earned her the epithet "immortal maiden." Her innate talent for hanmun (Chinese) verse prompted him to be her first tutor in her early years, and introduce her to Chinese writing, such as the Confucian Five Classics.

However, Hŏ Bong was also an outspoken and influential political scholar and was eventually exiled to Kapsan for three years for his political leanings. Her younger brother, Hŏ Kyun, was a similarly gifted poet who studied under Yi Tal, a specialist of Tang poetry and a friend of Hŏ Pong, and he took part in her education, especially after her elder brother's exile. He fostered her education later in life and used his preferred position as a highly respected male to keep her in correspondence with literary circles. Yi Tal, his tutor, also engaged in sharing Tang poetry with Nansŏrhŏn, whose influence became visible in the naturalism of a significant portion of her surviving work.

=== Marriage ===
In 1577, she married the son of a civil official, Kim Sŏngnip, and became his first wife. Her marriage was an unhappy one, as recorded by Hŏ Kyun. Her husband often left her alone at home to pursue other women, and she maintained a cold relationship with her mother-in-law. She gave birth to two children, a girl and a boy. Her daughter died within a year while her son died after living for 3 years. Within a year of her elder brother Hŏ Bong's death in Kapsan, she died of illness at the age of twenty-seven in 1589. Her husband later remarried in 1590 to woman from the Namyang Hong clan and he died childless two years later, but a male relative from his clan was later adopted to continue his line.

The circumstances and timing of her marriage are uncertain, and the documented proof is limited and subject to conjecture. Scholars such as Young-Key Kim-Renaud and Choe-Wall engage with her literature and hypothesize that she lived among her brothers for a significant portion of her life (during which they suggest most of her Tang-influenced and naturalistic poetry was produced), and married later. She suggests that the body of her "empathetic" poetry was produced after being married, as a result of the isolation from those who supported her literary talents and extended poetic circles. This conjecture is based on the observation that a significant portion of what is believed to be her later literature laments the plight and sufferings of married women, and her early literature follows closely in the Tang tradition, employing heavy elements of folklore and natural imagery rather than the heavier emotive language found in her later writing. This is only a supposition, however, as her Tang influenced poems could just as easily be read as tropes of the tradition utilized to veil her true feelings about women's unjust treatment. Moreover, some of these Tang influenced poems mention personal events in Nansŏrhŏn's life that occurred after her marriage.

== Writings ==
A significant amount of Nansŏrhŏn's writing was burned upon her death per her request, and the surviving poems are collected in Hŏ Kyŏngnan's 1913 collection Nansŏrhŏn chip. The collection consists of 211 poems, in various Chinese styles. These include koshi (traditional verse), yulshi (metered verse), cheolgu (quatrains), and a single example of kobu (rhyming prose). The writing of the early Joseon period (in the form of the political Sajang school and the more academic Sallim school) was heavily influenced by the Confucian literary tradition, and literature was primarily devoted to the expression of Confucian teachings. With the introduction of Tang poetry to Korea in the mid-Joseon Period, hanmun poetry began making significant strides as an art form. Traditional Tang poetry (koshi) was more formulaic and imposed prescriptive tonal guidelines. During the lifetime of Nansŏrhŏn, new forms of poetry that incorporated tonal irregularities, lines with non-standard syllable counts, and length (broadly referred to as kunch'e shi, of which yulshi and cheolgu are subsets) began to come into favor. Nansŏrhŏn's works are noted primarily for their broad range of subject matter, which is attributed in part to the drastic emotional shift evoked by her marriage.

The inclusion of two kasa written in hangul in the collection is one of scholarly contention, as her authorship is in doubt. Composition in hangul was considered unworthy of expressing higher thinking of Confucian ideals, and "literary" composition in Korea was almost entirely composed in hanmun. The distinction at the time was similar to the differences between Latin composition and vernacular prose in Renaissance Europe. Her authorship of these two pieces is supported mainly by the observation that the titles of the two kasa pieces, "Song of Woman's Complaint" and "Song of Coloring Nails with Touch-me-not Balsam" are very similar to two verified hanmun (cheolgu and koshi respectively). These claims have in part discredited by recent scholarship by O Haein (Nansorhon shijip) and Kang Cheongseop (Moktongga ui pogwon e taehayo).

=== Sample poems ===
The poem, "Song of Autumn Night" is characteristic of her earlier, more fantastical and imagery-rich poetry. It is a seven-syllable cheolgu.

秋夜曲

蟪蛄切切風瀟瀟
芙蓉香褪永輪高
佳人手把金錯刀
挑燈永夜縫征袍
玉漏微微燈耿耿
罹幃寒逼秋宵永
邊衣裁罷剪刀冷
滿窓風動芭蕉影

— Hŏ Nansŏrhŏn
Translation:

"Song of Autumn Night"

The grasshoppers are earnest and ardent; the winds are pure and clear.
The fragrance of the lotus fades; the eternal wheel high.
A beautiful woman's hands grabs a gold lacquered coin;
Lighting the lamp's wick, during the long night, she sews a gentleman's attire.
The water clock is dim and hazy; the lamp bright and luminous.
Inside the sickly tent, the cold near; the autumn night eternal.
Clothes for the frontier have finished drying; the scissors cold.
Filling the window are the winds blowing the shadow of plantains.

— Translated by Kuiwon

"The Young Seamstress," or "Song for the Poor Girl", is one of her poems of empathy, where she sympathizes with those from poorer economic backgrounds. It is a five-syllable cheolgu.

貧女吟

豈是乏容色
工鍼復工織
少小長寒門
良媒不相識
夜久織未休
戛戛鳴寒機
機中一匹練
終作阿誰衣
手把金翦刀
夜寒十指直
爲人作嫁衣
年年還獨宿

— Hŏ Nansŏrhŏn
Translation:

"The Young Seamstress"

How can this worn face appeal?
Working at embroidery, then returning to work at the weaving
from behind a gate where there is little or nothing and long without heat
The matchmaker won't let anyone know of one so meek.
All night without rest weaving the hempen cloth,
the loom going clack-clack, clack-clack, a chilly sound.
Weave one roll on the loom, and wonder
for whose house, whose daughter will it be a dowry?
Scissors in hand, cut the cloth in pieces;
and though the night is cold, all ten fingers are straight.
I make clothes for others going to be married,
while year after year, it is I who must sleep alone.

— Translated by David R. McCann

"Woman's Grievance," another seven-syllable cheolgu, exemplifies the tone of the poetry believed to have been written after her marriage.

閨怨

錦帶羅裙積淚痕
一年芳草恨王孫
瑤箏彈盡江南曲
雨打梨花晝掩門
月樓秋盡玉屛空
霜打蘆洲下暮鴻
瑤瑟一彈人不見
藕花零落野塘中

— Hŏ Nansŏrhŏn
Translation:

"Woman's Grievance"

Embroidered sash and silk skirt are wet with tears,
Every year fragrant plants lament a princely friend.
On my lute I play to its end the South River Song;
Showers of pear blossom patter on the door, shut all day.
Autumn is over at the moonlit pavilion; its jade screen desolate.
Frost encrusts the reed island; wild geese roost for the night.
I play upon the jasper lute. No one sees me.
Lotus flowers drop into the pond.

— Translated by Yang-hi Cheo-Wall

== Gallery ==
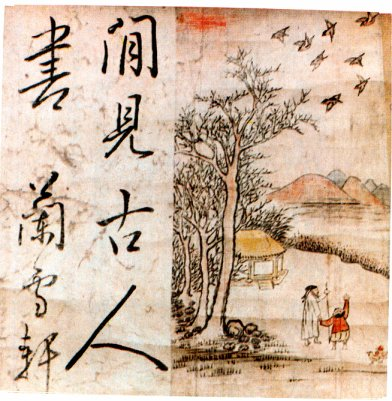
Anggan bigeumdo, painted by Hŏ Nansŏrhŏn

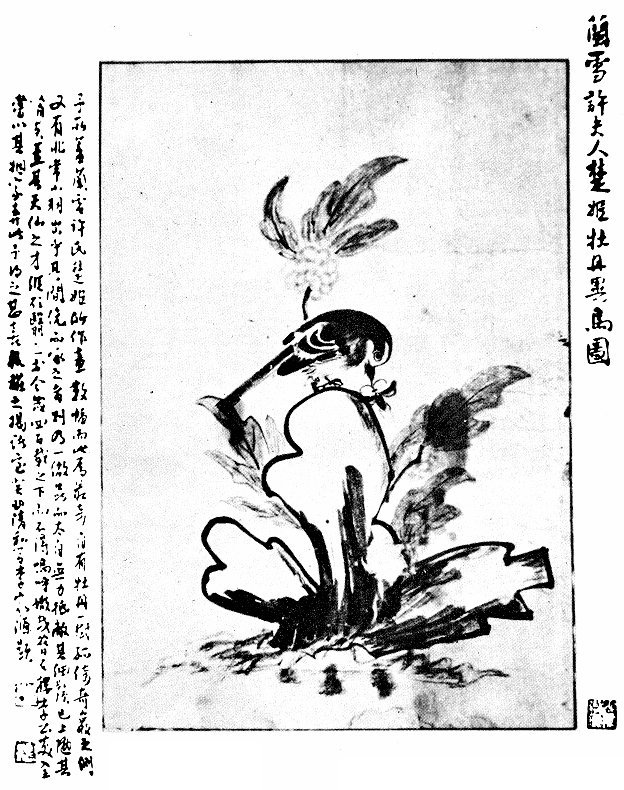
Mukjodo

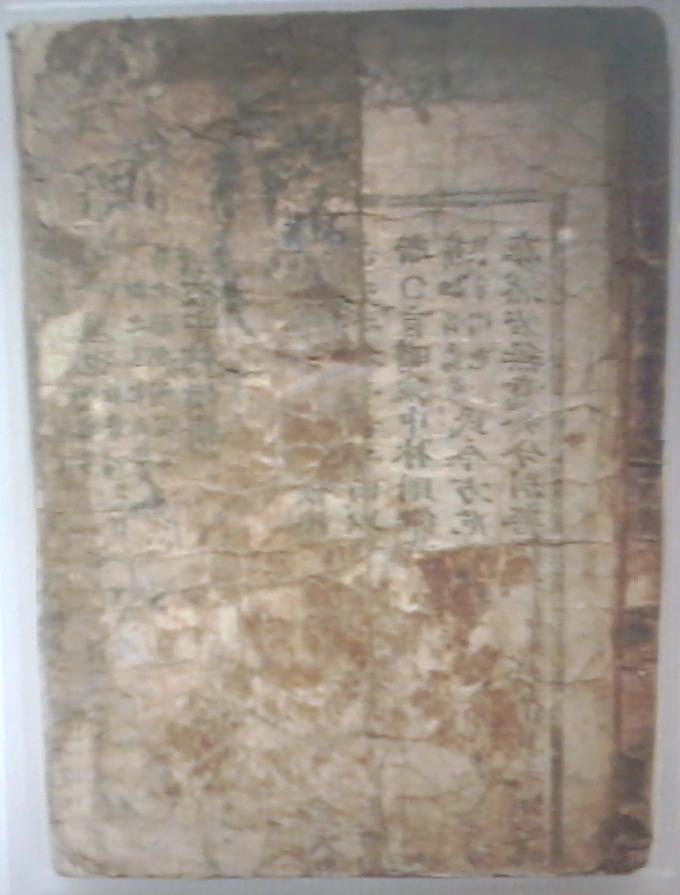
Nanseolheon jip

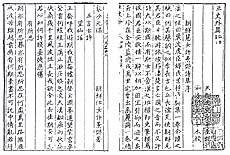
Her poetry book Chwesawonchang (1612)

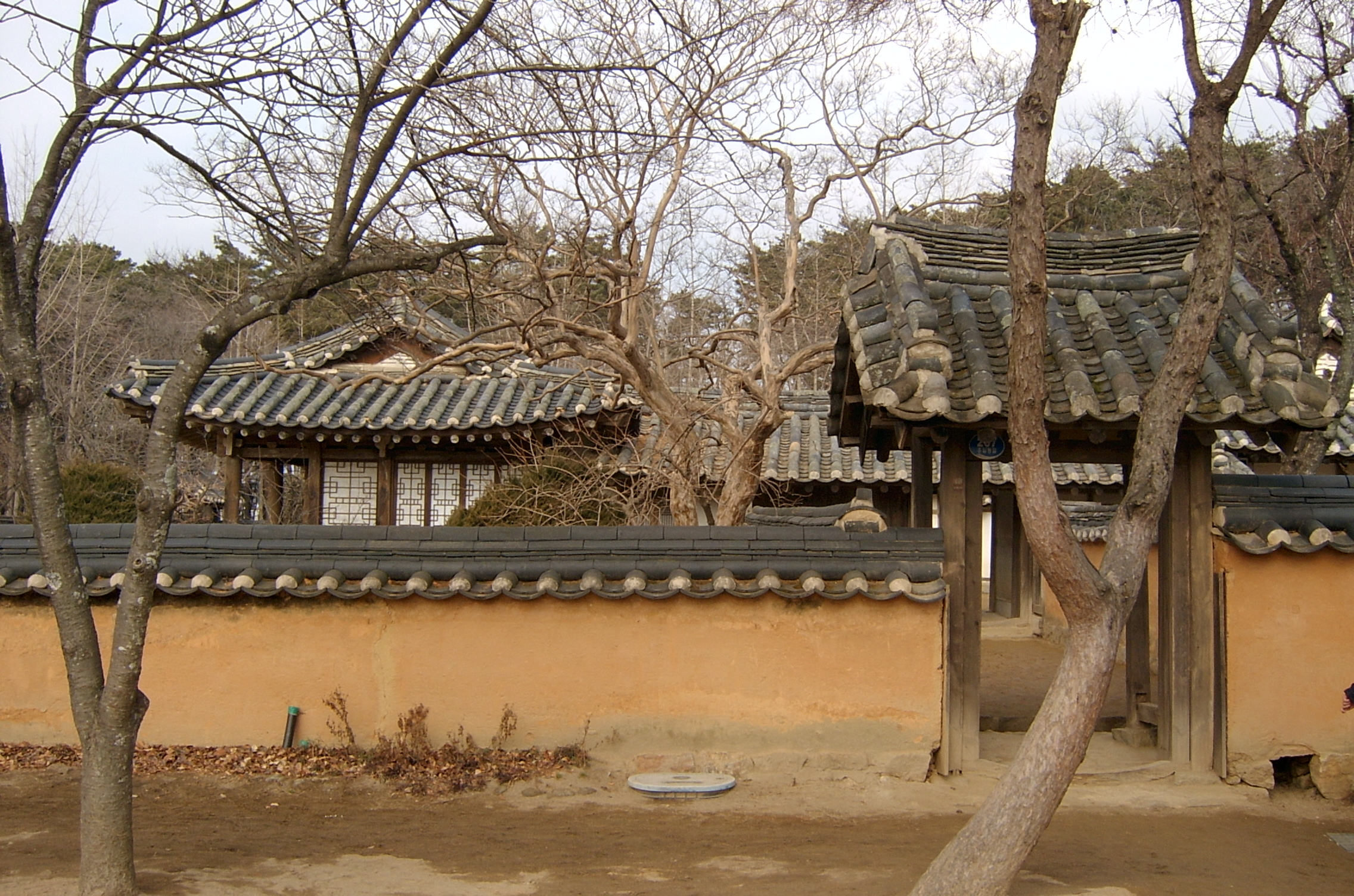
The house of her birth

== Works ==
- Nansŏrhŏn chip
- Chwesawonchang

== Family ==
- Father
  - Hŏ Yŏp (허엽; 許曄; 19 December 1517 – 4 February 1580)
- Mother
  - Lady Kim of the Gangneung Kim clan (정부인 강릉 김씨; 1523–?)
- Siblings
  - Older half-sister: Hŏ Muksŏk (허묵석; 許墨石), Lady Hŏ of the Yangcheon Hŏ clan (양천 허씨; 陽川 許氏; 1523–?)
  - Older half-brother: Hŏ Sŏng (허성; 許筬; 1548–1612)
  - Older brother: Hŏ Pong (허봉; 許篈; 1551–1588)
  - Older half-sister: Hŏ Taejŏng (허대정; 許大貞), Lady Hŏ of the Yangcheon Hŏ clan (증정부인 양천 허씨; 1553–?)
  - Younger brother: Hŏ Kyun (허균; 許筠; 10 December 1569 – 12 October 1618)
- Husband
  - Kim Sŏngnip (김성립; 金誠立) of the Andong Kim clan (안동 김씨; 1562–1592)
- Children
  - Son: Kim Hŭiyun (김희윤; 1579–1582)
  - Daughter: Lady Kim of the Andong Kim clan (안동 김씨; 1580–1581)
  - Adoptive son: Kim Chin (김진; 金振; 1603–1669); son of Kim Chŏngnip (김정립; 金正立; 1574–?)

== Bibliography ==
- Choe-Wall, Yang-hi. Vision of a Phoenix: the Poems of Hŏ Nansŏrhŏn.
- Kim, Jaihiun Joyce. Classical Korean Poetry.
- Kim-Renaud, Young-Key. Creative Women of Korea: the Fifteenth through the Twentieth Centuries.
- Lee, Peter H. Anthology of Korean Literature: from Early times to the Nineteenth Century.
- Lee, Peter H. The Columbia Anthology of Traditional Korean Poetry.
- McCann, David R. Early Korean Literature: Selections and Introductions.
- McCann, David R. Form and Freedom in Korean Poetry.
