= Hŏ Kyun =

Korean writer and politician (1569–1618)

- Hangul: 허균
- Hanja: 許筠
- RR: Heo Gyun
- MR: Hŏ Kyun

Art name
- Hangul: 교산, 성소, 백월거사
- Hanja: 蛟山, 惺所, 白月居士
- RR: Gyosan, Seongso, Baekwolgeosa
- MR: Kyosan, Sŏngso, Paegwŏlgŏsa

Hŏ Kyun (Korean: 허균; Hanja: 許筠; 3 November 1569 – 12 October 1618) was a Korean novelist, poet, and politician during the Joseon period. He was also known by his art names, Kyosan (교산) and Sŏngso (성소).

== Biography ==
Hŏ Kyun was born into the Yangcheon Heo clan in the city of Gangneung to Hŏ Yŏp and his second wife, Lady Kim of the Gangneung Kim clan.

Hŏ Kyun's older sister Heo Nanseolheon was a poet. Hŏ's family was of the noble (yangban) class (his father had been mayor of Gangneung) and as such Hŏ Kyun was afforded a solid education and in 1594 passed the nation's highest civil service exam.

Under the strong influence of his tutor, Yi Tal (이달; 李達), Hŏ Kyun became a progressive and liberal thinker who dreamed of establishing a more progressive society by eliminating Confucian elements in the social, literary, and political realms. Hŏ went on to serve the government of Joseon in such positions as Minister of the Board of Punishment and State Councillor. In the course of his political career he was exiled several times for involvement in political feuds and was ultimately executed on charges of treason during the reign of Prince Gwanghae.

Hŏ is often credited as the author of the famous Korean story Tale of Hong Gildong, which in many ways reflects his progressive thinking, although his authorship has been disputed.

== Family ==
- Father
  - Hŏ Yŏp (허엽; 許曄; 19 December 1517 – 4 February 1580)
- Mother
  - Lady Kim of the Gangneung Kim clan (정부인 강릉 김씨; 1523–?), married in 1548
- Siblings
  - Older half-sister - Hŏ Muksŏk (허묵석; 許墨石), Lady Hŏ of the Yangcheon Hŏ clan (양천 허씨; 陽川 許氏; 1523–?)
  - Older half-brother - Hŏ Sŏng (허성; 許筬; 1548–1612)
  - Older brother - Hŏ Pong (허봉; 許篈; 1551–1588)
  - Older half-sister - Hŏ Taejŏng (허대정; 許大貞), Lady Hŏ of the Yangcheon Hŏ clan (증 정부인 양천 허씨; 1553–?)
  - Older sister - Hŏ Ch'ohŭi, Heo Nanseolheon (난설헌 허씨; 蘭雪軒許氏; 1563 – 19 March 1589)
- Wives and their children
  - Lady Kim of the Andong Kim clan (정부인 안동 김씨; 1571 – 16 August 1592)
    - Father-in-law - Kim Taesŏp (김대섭; 1544–?)
    - Mother-in-law - Lady Sim of the Cheongseong Sim clan (청송 심씨; 1548–?)
      - Unnamed son (?–1618)
      - Daughter - Lady Hŏ of the Yangcheon Hŏ clan (양천 허씨; 1590–?)
        - Son-in-law - Yi Sasŏng (이사성; 李士星) of the Gwangju Yi clan (1590–?)
          - Grandson - Yi P'ilchin (이필진; 李必進; 1610–1671)
      - Daughter - Lady Hŏ of the Yangcheon Hŏ clan (양천 허씨; 1591–?)
      - Unnamed son (1592–1592); died prematurely
  - Lady Kim of the Seonsan Kim clan (정부인 선산 김씨; 1575–?)
    - Father-in-law - Kim Hyowŏn (김효원; 金孝元; 1542–1590)
    - Mother-in-law - Lady Chŏng of the Chogye Chŏng clan (초계 정씨; 1542–?)
      - Son - Hŏ Koeng (허굉; 許宏; 1595–?)
        - Grandson - Hŏ Kŭm (허금; 許嶔; 1620–?)
      - Daughter - Royal Consort Sohun of the Yangcheon Hŏ clan (소훈 허씨; 1603–?)
        - Son-in-law - Yi Ji, Deposed Crown Prince (폐세자 이지; 廢世子 李祬; 31 December 1598 – 22 July 1623)
- Concubine(s) and their issue
  - Ongmae (옥매; 玉梅; 1575–?)
  - Yi Maech'ang (이매창; 1575–?)
  - Song Sŏngok (송성옥; 宋成玉) of the Yeosan Song clan (1582–?); daughter of Song Ch'widae (송취대, 宋就大; 1566–?), of Yangmin origin
  - Lady Kim (김씨; 1573–?)
  - Ch'usŏm (추섬; 秋蟾) (Note: It was said that Hŏ Kyun committed adultery with Ch'usŏm and Hyŏn Ŭngmin but the women's whereabouts and birth/death dates are unknown)
  - Hyŏn Ŭngmin (현응민; 玄應旻)

== Works ==
- Honggildongjeon (홍길동전) (attributed)
- Dongguk myeongsandong cheonjuhaegi (동국명산동천주해기 東國名山洞天註解記)
- Domundaejak (도문대작 屠門大嚼)
- Namgungdujeon (남궁두전 南宮斗傳)
- Yujaeron (유재론 遺才論)
- Seongsobu bugo (성소부부고 惺所覆?藁)
- Haksan chodam (학산초담 鶴山樵談)
- Gukjo sisan (국조시산 國朝詩刪)
- Hanjeongnok (한정록 閑情錄)
- Gyosansihwa (교산시화 蛟山詩話)
- Gosiseon (고시선 古詩選)
- Sachesungdang (사체성당 四體盛唐)
- Dangsiseon (당시선 唐詩選)
- Songohghasicho (송오가시초 宋五家詩抄)
- Myungsagashiseon (명사가시선 明四家詩選)
- Eomcheosajeon (엄처사전)
- Songoksaninjeon (손곡산인전)
- Jangsaninjeon (장산인전)
- Jangsaengjeon (장생전)
- Namgung seonsaengjeon (남궁선생전)

== Gallery ==
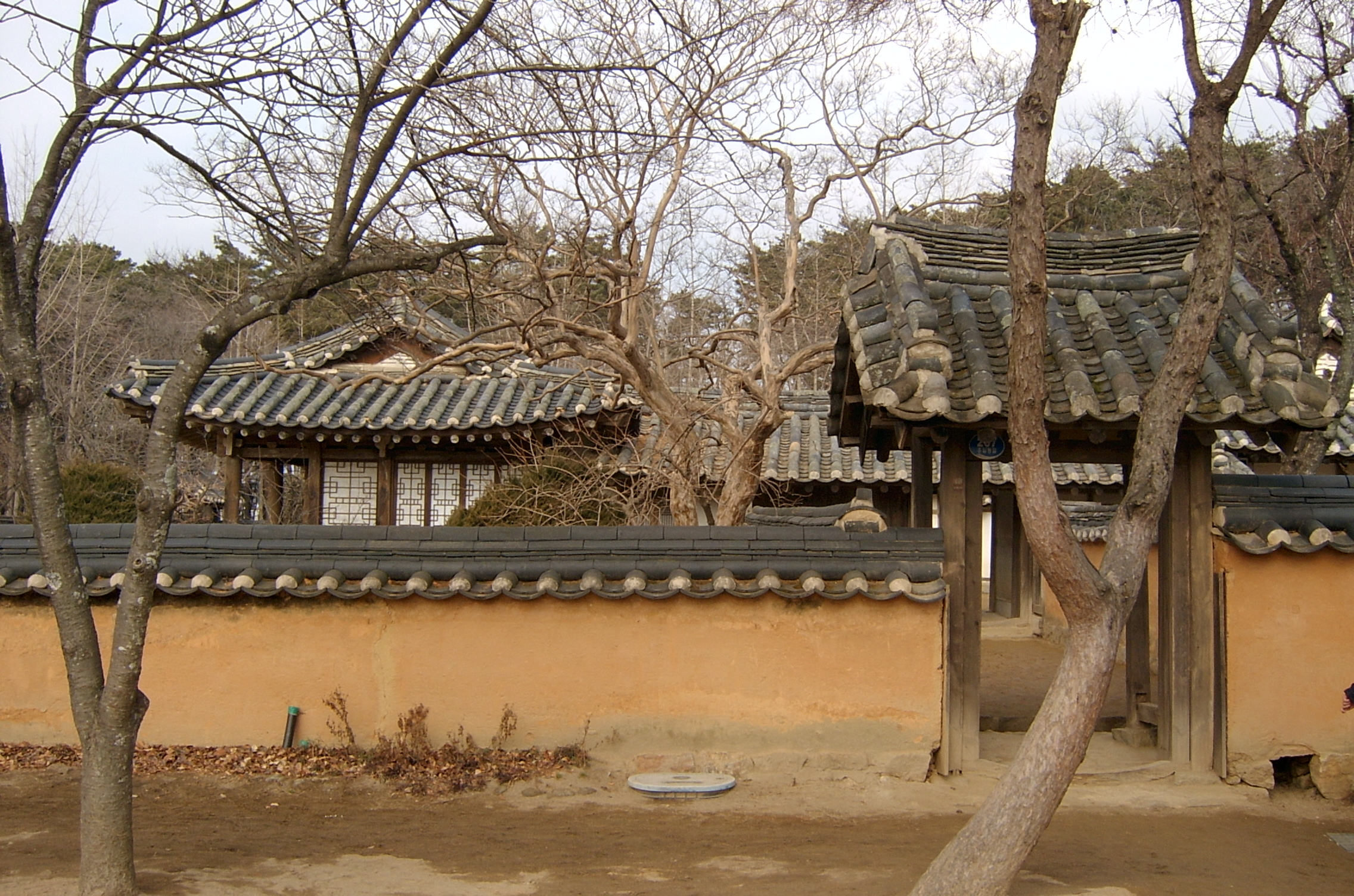
The house of Hŏ Kyun's birth in Gangneung.

== In popular culture ==
- Portrayed by Kim Joo-young in the 1986 MBC TV series The Hoechun Gate.
- Portrayed by Lee Dong-shin in the 1988 MBC TV series Queen Inhyeon.
- Portrayed by Kim Dong-hyun in the 1993 MBC TV series Iljimae.
- Portrayed by Kim Jong-kyul in the 1995 KBS TV series West Palace.
- Portrayed by Choi Jae-sung in the 2000 KBS TV series Roll of Thunder.
- Portrayed by Ryu Seung-ryong in the 2012 film Masquerade and in the 2014 SBS TV series My Love from the Star.
- Portrayed by Im Ji-Kyu in the 2014 KBS TV series The King's Face.
- Portrayed by Ahn Nae-sang in the 2015 MBC TV series Splendid Politics.
- Portrayed by Xiumin in the 2025 Netflix series Heo's Diner.

== Site web ==
- Hŏ Kyun (in Korean)
- Hŏ Kyun:Navercast (in Korean)
- Hŏ Kyun (in Korean)
