= Hur Woong =

South Korean linguist (1918–2004)

- Born: October 30, 1918; Gimhae, Korea, Empire of Japan
- Died: January 26, 2004; Seoul, South Korea
- Education: Yeonhi University (dropped out), Yonsei University, Department of Korean Language and Literature (Honorary Graduation, 1971)
- Occupations: Linguist, Professor
- Notable work: Korean Phonology (국어음운론, 1958), Introduction to Linguistics (언어학개론, 1963), Grammar of Old Korean (우리 옛말본, 1975), Korean Linguistics (국어학, 1983)
- Awards: Oesol Award (1973) Order of Civil Merit, Moran Medal (1984) Sejong Cultural Award (1990) Order of Civil Merit, Mugungwha Medal (2004)

Korean name
- Hangul: 허웅
- Hanja: 許雄
- RR: Heo Ung
- MR: Hŏ Ung

Art name
- Hangul: 눈뫼
- RR: Nunmoe
- MR: Nunmoe

Hur Woong or Huh Woong (Korean: 허웅; Hanja: 許雄; Korean pronunciation: [hʌ.uŋ]; October 30, 1918 – January 26, 2004) was a scholar of the Korean language and linguistics. He was a key figure in establishing Korean linguistics as a field of research in South Korea, and in combining the study of the Korean language with the study of linguistics. Hur Woong's tenure as the president of the Korean Language Society, spanning over three decades until his death, highlights the significance that his dedication and leadership had within the field of Korean linguistics.

His most notable works include Korean Phonology (국어음운론, 1958), Introduction to Linguistics (언어학개론, 1963), Grammar of Old Korean (우리 옛말본, 1975), and Korean Linguistics (국어학, 1983).

== Biography ==
=== Early life ===
Hur was born in 1918 as the third son of Soo Hur (허수) and Yeong-soon Yoon (윤영순). He entered Gimhae General School (김해보통학교) in 1926 and graduated in 1932. Though he enrolled in Dongnae General High School (동래고등보통학교) in the same year, he took a one-year leave of absence due to illness. Before returning to the third grade, he was strongly influenced by Choe Hyeon-bae's Korean Language and became fixated on the study of the Korean language.

After graduating from the high school, he enrolled in Yonhi College in hopes of studying directly under Choe, but dropped out in March 1939 when Choe was dismissed from teaching due to his involvement in the 1938 Heungeop Club incident. Hur's academic studies continued in his hometown, where he was self-taught.

=== Mid-life ===
Hur suffered from pulmonary infiltration from 1940 to 1942. During this period, he began his studies of Korean grammar in the 15th century. From 1943 to 1945, Hur worked as a clerk at a private training center in Changwon to avoid military conscription by the Imperial Japanese Army. Following the Korean liberation, he began teaching the Korean alphabet, Hangul, in his hometown, Gimhae.

Hur maintained several teaching positions throughout his career. Most notably, Hur was a co-founder of the Department of Korean Language and Literature in Pusan National University, where he held a teaching position as an assistant professor from 1947 to 1954. He also served as an assistant professor at Sungkyunkwan University (1953–1955). Later, he was invited as a chair professor at Yonsei University (1954–1958), Seoul National University (1960–1984), and Dong-a University (1968–1975 and 1984–1989).

=== Later life ===
Hur was appointed an honorary professor emeritus at Seoul National University and the Shanghai International Studies University after his retirement.

Hur also served as both the president and chairman of the Korean Language Society from 1971 to 2004. During his time as the president and chairman, Hur played a crucial role in the Korean language-only movement by opposing Sino-Korean education in elementary schools, confronted the mixing of Sino-Korean and English loanwords within certain Korean vocabularies, fought against the exclusion of Hangul Day from national holidays, and the Hanja Education Promotion Act.

=== Death ===
On January 26, 2004, Hur Woong died at the age of 87 at the Seoul National University Hospital, Bundang Branch. He was buried at Moran Park Cemetery in Namyangju.

== Achievements ==
Hur Woong's study of the Korean language began with the inheritance and cultivation of ethnic culture, as he strongly believed that language is the spirit of a nation and the driving force behind the cultural creation of its people. Hur incorporated this belief in his studies and tried to attain harmony between research and practice.

=== Korean Phonology ===
Korean Phonology (국어음운론) is the first public work to describe the phonology of the Korean language in South Korea.

The first edition consists of seven chapters: Phonetics, phonology, vocal organs and manners of articulation, the phonological system of the modern Korean language, fluctuation of phonology, phonetic symbols, and the history of phonological variations. As noted by the titles of each chapter, phonology, phonetics, and articulatory phonetics were discussed with utmost significance. In addition, throughout Hur's text, the phonological systems of modern and medieval Korean were described in detail, and the phonological changes between the two periods were organized by individual phonemes or by type of change.

The second edition, released in 1985, contained notable changes in vocabulary; words that were previously Sino-Korean were changed to be entirely Korean.

=== Introduction to Linguistics ===
Introduction to Linguistics (언어학개론) made notable efforts to relate the study of the Korean language to linguistics; this effort led scholars to change their perception of the study of the Korean language. This work established the theoretical system of Korean linguistics by discussing functional-structuralist language theory in Europe and technological-structuralist language theory in the United States. Though theoretical systems for linguistics were already well-known and practiced in Europe and the United States, Hur's work was the first to do so for the Korean language.

In order to highlight the importance of creating a newfound system for Korean language and linguistics, Hur stated the following in his preface to Introduction to Linguistics:

"Strangely, in our country, linguistics and the study of the Korean language have been mistakenly considered to be separate disciplines. We naturally associate linguistics with the study of Western languages, and it has been thought that all the subject matters and terminology should be in Western languages. Linguistics has highly developed in the West and we have learned it from the West so thinking like this might be natural. But this is a grand mistake. Linguistics is not such a distant field of study. Linguistics is the study of language, that is, speech, and the study of the Korean language is thus linguistics. For us, it is desirable to build general linguistics on the solid foundation of the study of the Korean language. Only then will we be able to ensure the strong development of Korean linguistics."

— Hur Woong

=== Grammar of Old Korean ===
Grammar of Old Korean (우리 옛말본) details the morphology of Korean. Following his study of Korean grammar in the 15th century, Hur began to research the history of Korean grammar and revised his study method by organizing the grammar rules by century and tracking the changes depending on the period. Results of this research culminated later in his Grammar of 16th Century Korean (16세기 우리 옛말본, 1989) and The History of 15th and 16th-Century Korean Grammar (15-16세기 우리 옛말본의 역사, 1991).

== Legacy ==
Many agree that Hur's studies have transformed the research of the Korean language into linguistics and acknowledge that his efforts to protect and nurture the Korean language were influential in formulating the field of Korean linguistics. Hur documented the Korean phonology and chronological changes in grammar, concentrating on the traditional Korean language. His efforts led to the improved perception of the study of the Korean language as a field of linguistics. Scholars describe Hur Woong's contribution to the field of Korean linguistics thus: "Hanhinsaem Ju Si-gyeong laid the foundation for Korean language study. Oesol Choe Hyeon-bae built a house on it, and Nunmoe Hur Woong finished the house."

Hur is credited to have been a key figure in the movement that resulted in the Korean language being recognized by linguists outside of Korea. Ha ChiKeun, the chairman of the Korean Language Society from 2007 to 2019, states that Hur's efforts led Hangul to garner much more attention from linguists around the world. According to the city of Gimhae in South Korea, Hur analyzed and studied Hangul from the perspective of linguistic science and announced that Hangul is superior to any other form of alphabet in the world. Hur's achievements and his name are more widely recognized by linguists around the world than in Korea.

In addition, Hur produced many disciples in his lifetime. Gimhae News states that "Hur not only devoted himself wholeheartedly to his research and his writings, but also to nurturing great successors. It would be difficult to find those who are not Hur Woong's disciples nor the disciples of his disciples among those who study linguistics within South Korea." The Busan Grand History and Culture, an organization that compiles and documents the historical and cultural heritage of Busan, supports this by mentioning that "Hur raised many followers who later played a pivotal role in the study of the Korean language in Busan and South Gyeongsang Province."

=== Criticism ===
Though largely praised for his contributions to the overall development of Korean linguistics as a field of study, Hur Woong was criticized posthumously for "having a long-term rule without raising any successors" as he concurrently served as both the president and chairman of the Korean Language Association for more than three decades. Song Hyun, the co-chairman of the Gathering of People Dedicated to Hangeul and the Korean Language Society (한글과 한글학회를 사랑하는 사람들의 모임), stated, "It's not just wrong that Hur Woong was in power for more than 30 years, but it's very wrong," adding, "If he had turned over his position to his successors after a decade, how much could his successors have grown?"

== Notable works ==
Korean Phonology (국어음운론, 1958)

Introduction to Linguistics (언어학개론, 1963)

Grammar of Old Korean (우리 옛말본, 1975)

Love for Our Speech and Writing: Theory of Korean Language Policy (우리말과 글에 쏟아진 사랑 -국어 정책론-, 1979)

Linguistics: Subject and Methodology (언어학 -그 대상과 방법-, 1983)

Korean Linguistics (국어학, 1983)

Korean Phonology: Korean Sounds of Today and Yesterday (국어 음운학 – 우리말 소리의 오늘 어제-, 1985)

The History of Temporal Systems in Korean (국어 때매김법의 변천사, 1987)

Grammar of 16th Century Korean (16세기 우리 옛말본, 1989)

The History of 15th and 16th-Century Korean Grammar (15, 16세기 우리 옛말본의 역사, 1991)

Choe Hyeon-bae: A Lifelong Dedication to Our Language and Spirit (최현배 -우리말 우리 얼에 바친 한평생-, 1993)

20th Century Korean Morphology (20세기 우리말의 형태론, 1995)

20th Century Korean Syntax (20세기 우리말의 통어론, 1999)

== Awards ==
1973 Oesol Award

1984 Order of Civil Merit, Moran Medal

1986 Sungkok Academic and Culture Award

1990 Sejong Cultural Award

1993 Ju Si-gyeong Academic Award

1998 Sage King Sejong Grand Prize

2000 Distinguished SNU Members Award

2004 Order of Civil Merit, Mugungwha Medal
