= Jangsu Hwang clan =

Korean clan from North Jeolla Province

- Country: Korea
- Current region: Jangsu County
- Founder: Hwang Gyeong
- Connected members: Hwang Hui; Hwang Yun-gil; Hwang Jin; Hwang Young-ha

Jangsu Hwang clan (Korean: 장수 황씨; Hanja: 長水 黃氏) is one of the Korean clans. Their Bon-gwan is in Jangsu County, North Jeolla Province. According to the research held in 2015, the number of Jangsu Hwang clan’s member was 170988. Hwang Rak (Hanja: 黄洛), a chief vassal in Han dynasty began Hwang clan in Korea. Hwang Rak (Hanja: 黄洛) had an accident on sea on his way to Vietnam as an envoy in 28 during Emperor Guangwu of Han’s reign. Then, Hwang Rak (Hanja: 黄洛) drifted ashore and was naturalized in Silla. Hwang Gyeong, Hwang Rak (Hanja: 黄洛)’s descendant, became Prince of Jangsu and Jangsu Hwang clan’s founder.

== See also ==
- Korean clan names of foreign origin
