= Ch'unch'ugwan =

Joseon government office

The Ch'unch'ugwan (Korean: 춘추관; Hanja: 春秋館; lit. 'Spring and Autumn Office') was a government office during the Joseon dynasty. It refers to the office for recording history. During the Goryeo dynasty, it was known as Yemun Ch'unch'ugwan (예문춘추관; 藝文春秋館) or Munhansŏ (문한서; 文翰署), but the name was changed in 1401 after the foundation of the Joseon dynasty.

== History ==
Many people associate Ch'unch'ugwan with the Joseon dynasty era, but, in fact, Ch'unch'ugwan has existed since the Goryeo dynasty. It just begun to earn historical recognition from Joseon dynasty era. It started to be called the Ch'unch'ugwan from the time of king Taejong of Joseon. It had been called Yemun or Ch'unch'ugwan during Goryeo era.

=== Purpose ===
Officers of Ch'unch'ugwan are made up of eight men. Their official rank is low, between Chŏng 6-pum and Chŏng 8-pum (정 6품/정 8품; 正六品/正八品), but they stay where the king is, for example, a royal progress, meeting with courtiers and attendance of morning assembly. They write sach'o (사초; 史草), recording popular sentiment and king's every movement. The Annals of the Joseon Dynasty is based on this recording.

=== Structure ===
There are no officers in Ch'unch'ugwan, because workers of other offices hold an additional position in Ch'unch'ugwan. Yŏngŭijŏng take consul that is the leader of Ch'unch'ugwan, Uuijeong (the second vice-premier) and Chwaŭijŏng take governor and workers of other offices take rest of office positions. There are Chŏng 2-p'um and Jong 2-p'um (정 2품/종 2품; 正二品/ 從二品) that each of them is two people, Chŏng 3-p'um and Jong 3-p'um (정 3품/종 3품; 正三品/ 從三品), and Chŏng 5-p'um and Jong 5-p'um (정 5품/종 5품; 正五品/ 從五品) in the Ch'unch'ugwan.

== Legacy ==
The name Ch'unch'ugwan is also applied to the building which houses the approximately 150 domestic and international correspondents who cover the Blue House, the official residence of the President of South Korea. The first and second floor of the building has a pressroom and briefing room, respectively. Presidential news conferences and daily briefings are held in the briefing room. This building was opened in 1990. Its traditional Korean gabled roof is covered with clay tiles to harmoniously blend in with the surrounding landscape. The name was chosen to emphasize fair criticism and strict objectivity in recording history.

== See also ==
- Joseon dynasty
- Cheong Wa Dae
- Annals of the Joseon Dynasty
