= Veritable Records of the Joseon Dynasty =

1392–1865 Korean royal records

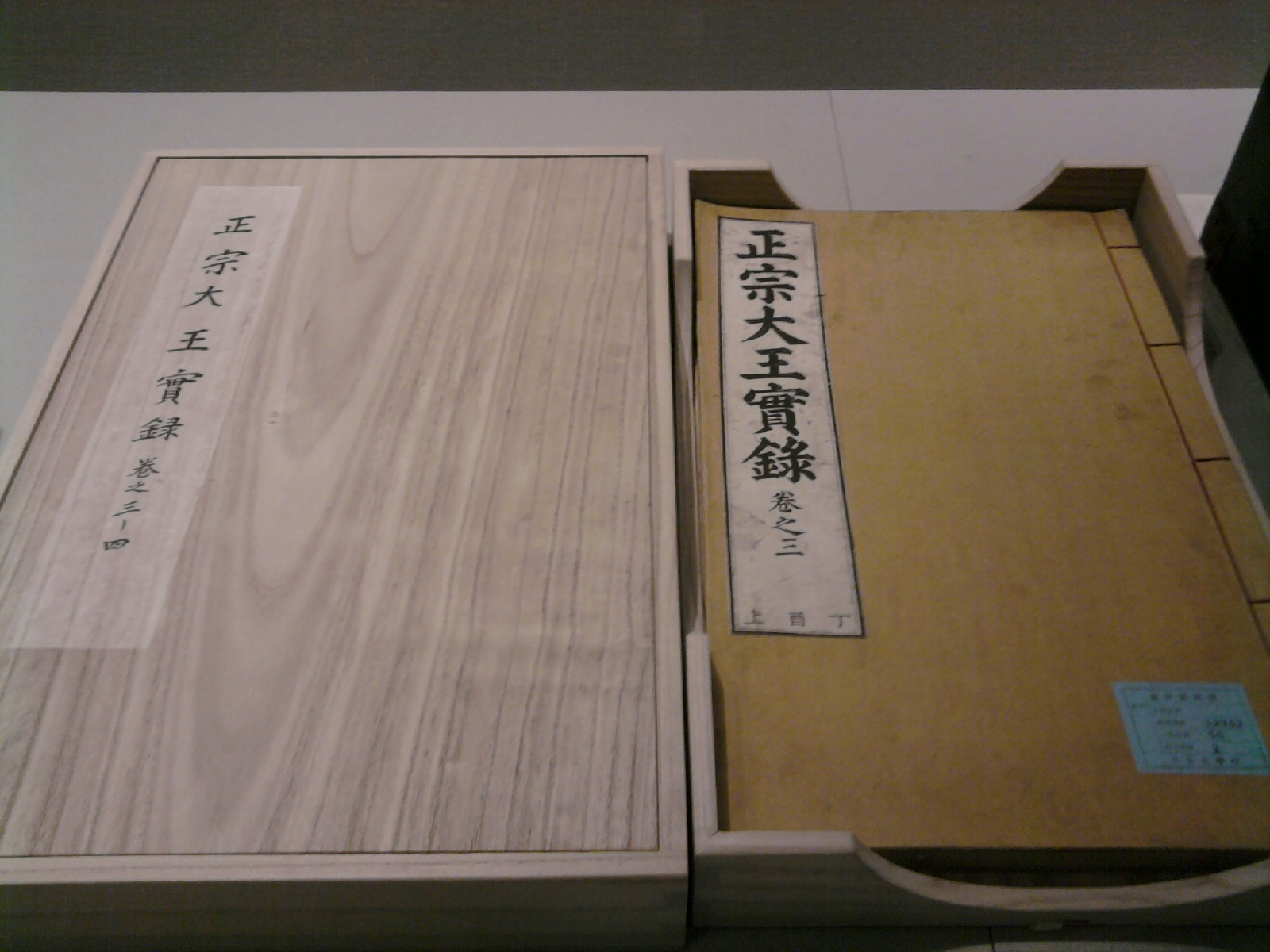
- Veritable Records of Jeongjo
- Language: Classical Chinese
- Publication place: Joseon
- Website: http://sillok.history.go.kr/main/main.jsp

South Korean name
- Hangul: 조선왕조실록
- Hanja: 朝鮮王朝實錄
- RR: Joseon wangjo sillok
- MR: Chosŏn wangjo sillok

North Korean name
- Hangul: 조선봉건왕조실록
- Hanja: 朝鮮封建王朝實錄
- RR: Joseon bonggeon wangjo sillok
- MR: Chosŏn ponggŏn wangjo sillok

The Veritable Records of the Joseon Dynasty, (Note: South Korean name: 조선왕조실록; 朝鮮王朝實錄. North Korean name: 조선봉건왕조실록; 朝鮮封建王朝實錄. Also translated as Annals of the Joseon Dynasty or the True Record of the Joseon Dynasty. Alternate name Veritable Records of the Yi Dynasty (이조실록; 李朝實錄).) sometimes called sillok (실록) for short, are state-compiled and published records, called Veritable Records, documenting the reigns of the kings of the Joseon dynasty in Korea. Kept from 1392 to 1865, they comprise 1,893 volumes and are thought to be the longest continual documentation of a single dynasty in the world.

The records of the last two monarchs are believed to have been influenced by the Japanese colonial rule and, therefore, their credibility compromised. Excluding the records of the last two kings, the sillok is designated as the 151st national treasure of South Korea and listed in UNESCO's Memory of the World registry.

In 2006, the annals were digitized and made available online by the National Institute of Korean History. Both a modern-Korean translation in hangul and the original in Classical Chinese are available. In January 2012, the National Institute of Korean History announced a plan to translate them to English by 2033. The work was scheduled to start in 2014 with an initial budget of ₩500 million, but it was estimated that a total of ₩40 billion would be needed to complete the project.

== Compilation process ==
The Ch'unch'ugwan, overseen by the three High State Councillors, served as the state archive for administrative records. However, the eight historians of the seventh, eighth, and ninth ranks in the Office of Royal Decrees (예문관; 藝文館) were responsible for maintaining daily records of official court activities. These historians accompanied the king at all times, and Joseon kings did not conduct official business without a historian present. The daily historical records produced by the eight historians were called sacho (사초; 史草; lit. 'raw historical material'), which served as the basis for the compilation.

After the death of a king, the veritable records, or sillok, of the deceased monarch's reign were compiled by a special committee known as the Sillokch'ŏng, or the Office of Annals Compilation. This committee included high-ranking officials and the most competent scholars. The compilation relied on various primary sources, including the sacho, historians' private memoranda, administrative records (시정기; 時政記), and the Seungjeongwon ilgi.

The compilation process consisted roughly of three phases. First, the primary sources were gathered, and the historians produced the first draft (초초; 初草; lit. 'initial draft'). This draft was then refined into a second draft (중초; 中草; lit. 'middle draft'), which was reviewed and finalized by high-ranking officials into a final draft (정초; 正草; lit. 'official draft'). Once finalized, the drafts, sacho, and the historians' private memoranda were pulped in water and expunged (세초; 洗草; lit. 'wash drafts') to prevent leaks.

Great care was taken to ensure the integrity of the records; historians were guaranteed legal protection and editorial independence, especially from the king. Only the historians were allowed to read the sacho; if any historian disclosed or altered its contents, they were subject to severe punishment. Pulping and expunging the drafts and certain primary sources likely to contain historian commentary was a safety measure designed to insulate the historians from political influences and preserve the integrity of the records.

An oft-cited story in the sillok about King Taejong falling off his horse has been used to illustrate the commitment of Joseon court historians to documenting even events displeasing or embarrassing to the king and the extent to which the king could not influence which stories were included in the sillok:

親御弓矢, 馳馬射獐, 因馬仆而墜, 不傷。顧左右曰: "勿令史官知之。" (Note: Translated into Korean using hangul: 친히 활과 화살을 가지고 말을 달려 노루를 쏘다가 말이 거꾸러짐으로 인하여 말에서 떨어졌으나 상하지는 않았다. 좌우를 돌아보며 말하기를, "사관(史官)이 알게 하지 말라."하였다.)

Translation:

The king himself rode a horse and shot arrows at a deer. However, the horse stumbled, causing him to fall off, but he was not injured. Looking around, he said, "Do not let the historians know about this."

— The Veritable Records of Taejong, Vol. 7, article 4

The historian present defied King Taejong's order and ensured that not only the king's fall but also his wish to keep it off the record were documented. This happened in the 4th year of Taejong's reign, on the 8th day, 2nd month of the lunar calendar, equivalent to March 18, 1404, of the Julian calendar.

The records are written in Classical Chinese. The records of the first three kings of the Joseon dynasty—Taejo (r. 1392–1398), Jeongjong (r. 1399–1400), and Taejong (r. 1401–1418)—were handwritten. The records of Sejong (r. 1418–1450) and later kings were printed using movable type, some wooden and others metal. Korea is the first nation in East Asia to have printed its royal records using movable type.

== History ==
Beginning in 1445, they began creating three additional copies of the records, which were deposited in various locations across Korea in hopes that one of them would survive. The locations included the Ch'unch'ugwan office in Seoul, Chungju County, Jeonju County, and Seongju County. Despite such precautionary measures, during the 1592–1598 Japanese invasions of Korea, all but the one in Jeonju were destroyed. The Jeonju records narrowly escaped destruction by fire only because several scholars had taken private initiative. After the war, the government began maintaining five repositories at Ch'unch'ugwan, Mount Myohyang, Taebaeksan, Odaesan, and Manisan.

The 1624 Yi Kwal's Rebellion resulted in the destruction of the Ch'unch'ugwan repository. It was not replaced; the government ultimately returned to printing four copies of the records and storing them at the other repositories. The Mount Myohyang copy was moved to Jeoksangsan in 1633. Part of the Manisan collection was lost during the 1636 Qing invasion of Joseon, and the surviving volumes moved to Jeongjoksan on Ganghwa Island in 1678.

During the 1910–1945 Japanese colonial period, the records went under the control of the Japanese colonial government. The Jeongjoksan and Taebaeksan repositories were transferred to the holdings of Keijō Imperial University in Seoul (the city was then called "Keijō"). The Odaesan copies were taken to Tokyo Imperial University in Japan. There, they were mostly destroyed during the 1923 Great Kantō earthquake. The remaining 46 volumes in Japan were not returned to Korea until 2006.

The annals of the last two Joseon rulers, Veritable Records of Gojong and Veritable Records of Sunjong, are controversial and considered by modern South Korean historians to lack the impartiality of the other sources. This is because Japanese officials interfered in their creation and curation. They are thus considered relatively separate from the other records, and are not included in the National Treasures of South Korea or UNESCO's Memory of the World register.

Around the 1945 liberation of Korea, the Jeoksangsan copies were partially looted during the instability; there are reportedly uncertain rumors that some of these copies were actually taken during the 1950–1953 Korean War to North Korea. The Jeongjoksan and Taebaeksan records were still held in the collection Kyujanggak, at Seoul National University (the successor to Keijō Imperial University). In the 1980s, the Taebaeksan copies were moved to the National Archives of Korea, Busan Center.

== List ==
List of records
	English	Hangul	Hanja	# volumes (gwon)	# books (chaek)	Monarch	Start of compilation	Notes
1	Veritable Records of Taejo	태조실록	太祖實錄	15	3	Taejo (r. 1392–1398)	1413	
2	Veritable Records of Jeongjong	정종실록	定宗實錄	6	1	Jeongjong (r. 1398–1400)	1426	
3	Veritable Records of Taejong	태종실록	太宗實錄	36	16	Taejong (r. 1400–1418)	1431	
4	Veritable Records of Sejong	세종실록	世宗實錄	163	67	Sejong (r. 1418–1450)	1454	
5	Veritable Records of Munjong	문종실록	文宗實錄	13	6	Munjong (r. 1450–1452)	1455	
6	Veritable Records of Danjong	단종실록	端宗實錄	14	6	Danjong (r. 1452–1455)	1469	Changed name from Diary of Nosangun (노산군일기, 魯山君日記) in 1698.
7	Veritable Records of Sejo	세조실록	世祖實錄	49	18	Sejo (r. 1455–1468)	1471	
8	Veritable Records of Yejong	예종실록	睿宗實錄	8	3	Yejong (r. 1468–1469)	1472	
9	Veritable Records of Seongjong	성종실록	成宗實錄	297	47	Seongjong (r. 1469–1494)	1499	
10	Diary of Yeonsangun	연산군일기	燕山君日記	63	17	Yeonsangun (r. 1494–1506)	1509	
11	Veritable Records of Jungjong	중종실록	中宗實錄	105	53	Jungjong (r. 1506–1544)	1550	
12	Veritable Records of Injong	인종실록	仁宗實錄	2	2	Injong (r. 1544–1545)	1550	
13	Veritable Records of Myeongjong	명종실록	明宗實錄	34	21	Myeongjong (r. 1545–1567)	1571	
14	Veritable Records of Seonjo	선조실록	宣祖實錄	221	116	Seonjo (r. 1567–1608)	1616	
14	Revised Veritable Records of Seonjo	선조수정실록	宣祖修訂實錄	42	8	Seonjo (r. 1567–1608)	1657	
15	Diary of Gwanghaegun	광해군일기	光海君日記	187	64	Gwanghaegun (r. 1608–1623)	1633	
15	Diary of Gwanghaegun	광해군일기	光海君日記	187	40	Gwanghaegun (r. 1608–1623)	1653	
16	Veritable Records of Injo	인조실록	仁祖實錄	50	50	Injo (r. 1623–1649)	1653	
17	Veritable Records of Hyojong	효종실록	孝宗實錄	21	22	Hyojong (r. 1649–1659)	1661	
18	Veritable Records of Hyeonjong	현종실록	顯宗實錄	22	23	Hyeonjong (r. 1659–1674)	1677	
18	Revised Veritable Records of Hyeonjong	현종개수실록	顯宗改修實錄	28	29	Hyeonjong (r. 1659–1674)	1683	
19	Veritable Records of Sukjong	숙종실록	肅宗實錄	65	73	Sukjong (r. 1674–1720)	1728	
20	Veritable Records of Gyeongjong	경종실록	景宗實錄	15	7	Gyeongjong (r. 1720–1724)	1732	
20	Revised Veritable Records of Gyeongjong	경종수정실록	景宗修訂實錄	5	3	Gyeongjong (r. 1720–1724)	1781	
21	Veritable Records of Yeongjo	영조실록	英祖實錄	127	83	Yeongjo (r. 1724–1776)	1781	Renamed from Veritable Records of Yeongjong (영종실록, 英宗實錄) in 1899.
22	Veritable Records of Jeongjo	정조실록	正祖實錄	54	56	Jeongjo (r. 1776–1800)	1805	Renamed from Veritable Records of Jeongjong (정종실록, 正宗實錄) in 1899.
23	Veritable Records of Sunjo	순조실록	純祖實錄	34	36	Sunjo (r. 1800–1834)	1838	Renamed from Veritable Records of Sunjong (순종실록, 純宗實錄) in 1899.
24	Veritable Records of Heonjong	헌종실록	憲宗實錄	16	9	Heonjong (r. 1834–1849)	1851	
25	Veritable Records of Cheoljong	철종실록	哲宗實錄	15	9	Cheoljong (r. 1849–1864)	1865	
26	Veritable Records of Gojong	고종실록	高宗實錄	52	52	Gojong (r. 1864–1907)	1934	Often excluded from the collection by Korean academics.
27	Veritable Records of Sunjong	순종실록	純宗實錄	22	8	Sunjong (r. 1907–1910)	1934	Often excluded from the collection by Korean academics.

== See also ==
- Seungjeongwon ilgi
- Samguk Sagi
- Samguk Yusa
- Goryeosa
- Office of the Yi Dynasty
