= Han Kŭkham =

Korean military leader (?–1593)

- 한극함
- Died: 16th day, 5th month of 1593
- Cause of death: Execution
- Military career
- Allegiance: Joseon
- Rank: Rank 2B
- Conflicts: Imjin War; Battle of Haejŏngch'ang

Korean name
- Hangul: 한극함
- Hanja: 韓克諴
- RR: Han Geukham
- MR: Han Kŭkham

Courtesy name
- Hangul: 극숙
- Hanja: 克淑
- RR: Geuksuk
- MR: Kŭksuk

Han Kŭkham (Korean: 한극함; Hanja: 韓克諴; died on the 16th day, 5th month of 1593) was a Korean military commander active during the mid-Joseon period.

== Imjin War ==
Han Kŭkham held the position of Provincial Military Commander (병마절도사; 兵馬節度使) in Northern Hamgyŏng at the outbreak of the Imjin War in 1592. When the Second Japanese Division under Katō Kiyomasa advanced into the region, Prince Imhae—dispatched to mobilize loyalist resistance—ordered Han to obstruct the Japanese incursion. Han sought to mobilize troops from the Six Garrison Posts of Northeastern Hamgyŏng (육진; 六鎭) and preemptively secure Mach'ŏllyŏng pass (마천령; 摩天嶺). However, the Japanese vanguard under Katō had already crossed the pass by the time his forces arrived.

=== Battle of Haejŏngch'ang ===
On the 17th day, 7th month of 1592, Han Kŭkham launched a surprise attack on Japanese forces stationed at Haejŏngch'ang (해정창; 海汀倉), a granary facility located in Sŏngjin close to the pass. Initially, the Joseon forces leveraged their superiority in cavalry and archery on open terrain, forcing the Japanese to retreat into the compound. Han's forces laid siege to the warehouse.

However, the Japanese troops fortified their position using grain sacks, which shielded them from arrows and enabled effective counterattacks using arquebuses. As conditions worsened, Han withdrew to a nearby hilltop and established a defensive encampment. On the 18th day, 7th month of 1592, utilizing dense fog for concealment, Japanese troops launched a surprise attack on the hill, causing disarray in the Joseon ranks. Following the collapse of the defense at Haejŏngch'ang, Han fled the battlefield and retreated to Kyŏngsŏng. Ham relocated as far as Sŏsura, a Jurchen village to avoid Japanese troops, but was denied refuge. Eventually, he was sheltered by civilians in Kyŏngwŏn, where he was captured by local collaborators and turned over to the Japanese.

=== Captivity and death ===
During his captivity, Han cooperated with Katō Kiyomasa, allegedly offering forty strategic recommendations and surrendering his two daughters to the Japanese general. His son, Han Kyŏk (한격; 韓格), also provided geographical intelligence, including maps of Joseon and Ming China. Amid mounting pressure from Ming reinforcements and irregular forces led by Chŏng Munbu, the Japanese army began its retreat to Seoul. During this withdrawal, in 4th month of 1593, Han Kŭkham succeeded in escaping from captivity. Han escaped from Japanese custody and reached the camp of Ko Ŏnbaek. There, he was arrested. Due to his abandonment of Princes Imhae and Sunhwa, as well as his collaboration with the enemy while in captivity, Han Kŭkham was executed on 16th day, 5th month of 1593.

== See also ==
- Hamgyong campaign
