= Battle of Yonan =

- Part of the Imjin War
Date	3 – 6 October 1592 (Gregorian Calendar); 28 August – 2 September 1592 (Lunar calendar)
Location	Yonan, Joseon 37.906°N 126.158°E
Result	Joseon victory

Belligerents
Joseon	Japan

Commanders and leaders
Yi Jeong-am; Jang Eung-gi; Yi Dae-chun	Kuroda Nagamasa

Strength
500~1,400	3,000~5,000

Casualties and losses
31	Almost half
- Location within North Korea

- Korean name
- Hangul: 연안 전투
- Hanja: 延安戰鬪
- RR: Yeonan jeontu
- MR: Yŏnan chŏnt'u

The Battle of Yonan was a confrontation between Joseon "righteous army" forces led by Yi Jeong-am and the 3rd Division of the Japanese Army led by Kuroda Nagamasa in Yonan, Hwanghae Province, Joseon from 3 to 6 October 1592.

== Background ==
=== Joseon ===
Yi Jeong-am belatedly heard that his King Seonjo had fled to Kaesong and headed for Kaesong. On June 12, King Seonjo fled Kaesong to Pyongyang again after news broke that Joseon troops led by Kim Myŏngwŏn had been defeated. At that time, Yi Jeong-am remained with his younger brother Yi Jeong-hyeong, who was newly appointed as the head of Kaesong. And when the Japanese army occupied Kaesong after the Joseon troops were defeated in the Battle of Imjin River on, they fled to Paechon, Hwanghae Province to gather a righteous army. Gwanghaegun arrived in Icheon via Maengsan in Pyongan Province and Koksan in Hwanghae Province to set up a provisional government and tried to patch up its response system to the Japanese military by recovering troops from various regions. Yi Jeong-am was appointed as a Suppressor (초토사; Chotosa) in Hwanghae Province by the provisional government. Yi Jeong-am sent out a manifesto to various parts of Hwanghae Province to collect scattered soldiers. When more than 500 troops gathered, they entered the Yonan fortress on September 27 to maintain the army. When Yi entered the fortress, all the houses in the fortress were empty. However, when they heard that they were defending the fortress, they returned one after another and the magistrate, who had fled.

=== Japan ===
While the northern front was collapsing, the Japanese army's advance was stalled in Pyongyang due to the uprising of righteous armies in various parts of the southern front, which led to the guerrilla warfare, and the Japanese army's difficulty in advancing its amphibious operations due to the naval forces led by Yi Sun-sin. Because of this situation, the Japanese military needed to expand its power to the surrounding areas, and it was decided that the Third Division of Kuroda Nagamasa, which had 11,000 soldiers, would be in charge of targeting Hwanghae Province.

=== Yonan Fortress ===
It is about 4.5 meters tall with a square plane. One of the ramparts of the fortress passed Yeonseong-ri along the southern foot of the mountain Namsan in Yonan-eup and reached Mojeong-ri. The other side of rampart crossed the middle of Namsan Mountain, passed the road in Yonan-eup, and climbed to Seolbongsan Mountain via Gwancheon-ri.

In 1555, Magistrate Bak Eung-jong built two barbicans and 693 battlements, and there were bows and gun holes. The gates were located in four places, east, west, north, and south. Inside the fortress, there were wells called Seopungcheonjeong and Gunjajeong. Outside the walls, the moat was dug wide and collected and filled with water flowing down from Bongse Mountain in the north. As such, Yonan Fortress was small in size, but it was a solid fortress with well-equipped defense facilities. In 1591, the year before the Japanese Invasion of Korea in 1592, Sin Kak extended the fortress at the recommendation of Cho Hŏn.

== Battle ==
On October 3, 1592, about 1,000 vanguard members of Kuroda Nagamasa, the commander of the 3rd Division of the Japanese Army, approached the Yonan Fortress. Some offered to abandon the fortress to Yi Jeong-am based on the Japanese military's vigor, but Yi refused.

The Japanese army surrounded the fortress and sent a letter to the envoy, which urged him to surrender. Yi Jeong-am wrote to the envoy, saying, "You fight with soldiers, but we fight with righteousness." The Japanese troops who surrounded the fortress began to climb the fortress using ladders. They also came up by connecting wooden plates to the fortress. The righteous army shot arrows and rolled stones to defeat the Japanese soldiers who were scaling the walls. On that afternoon, a Japanese general approached the fortress riding a white horse holding a white flag, Jang Eung-gi shot a bow to hit his chest, and quickly opened the gate and cut off his head, raising the morale of the righteous army.

On October 4, the Japanese army launched a full-fledged assault with arquebuses, and Yi Jeong-am allowed the defending army to shoot arrows only at the Japanese soldier climbing rampart, preparing for a long-term war and used boiling water to defend the fortress. Japanese soldiers climbed the fortress using ladders and wooden plates again. Some had already climbed to the fortress. Yi Dae-chun, the chief of the west gate, cut down those who climbed the fortress and fired iron arrows to drop the wooden plates. As the large and heavy plates fell, all the Japanese soldiers below were crushed to death. The Japanese forces built a high attic on Namsan Mountain and opened a hole in the wall of the board, looked down, and fired guns. In response, in the fortress, piles of earth walls were built to block it. On that night, the Japanese attacked the fortress with flaming arrows at the west gate, but the fire was extinguished due to the change of wind due to the headwind. A soldier who guarded the rampart as the enemy sneaked up to the western rampart under the cover of the fog at night surrounded them with torches and burned more than 40 soldiers.

On October 5, Japanese commander Kuroda Nagamasa personally led and commanded 5,000 soldiers. The righteous army resisted the Japanese by throwing all weapons, but the Joseon righteous army and people, who were on the defensive, were inferior in number. When the fortress was on the verge of being destroyed, Yi Jeong-am piled firewood and sat on top of it and called his son, Yi Jun, to say this: "If this fortress falls, set it on fire. I would rather burn myself here than be insulted by the Japanese."

Also, Kim Hyo-sun, who was held captive by the Japanese military amid the war, escaped and ran to Yonan Fortress, bringing with him a message that, "The enemy will withdraw if we hold out until tomorrow morning.". With the encouragement of the commander and the message of their prisoner of war who escaped from the enemy camp, the morale of the soldiers of Joseon was renewed.

On the night of October 6, Jeon Hyeon-ryong and Jo Sin-ok snuck out of the gate, took the straws to the Japanese camp and set it on fire. As the flames soared, the Japanese scattered. Yi Dae-chun threw burning straw on the Japanese soldiers climbing up the wall. When the morning dawned, the Japanese army eventually gave up on the Yonan fortress and retreated. Yi Jeong-am formed a chase team led by Yi Dae-chun to raid the rear of the Japanese army. They captured about 90 horses and cows, and 130 bushels of rice and the battle ended.

== Aftermath ==
The Japanese military suffered numerous casualties and losses in the armed forces. After losing the battle, Kuroda Nagamasa's Third Army changed its operation from trying to take control of the entire Hwanghae Province to guarding areas near major supply routes from Hanyang to Pyongyang. As a result, Joseon was able to protect Yeongbaek Plain, a granary in the Hwanghae, as well as secure transportation routes from Jeolla Province to Uiju. In addition, the wandering people of about 10 towns north of the Yonan were able to return to their homes, and the fleeing leaders were able to return to the main town.

Without posting a lengthy report, Yi Jeong-am only sent eight letters to the government, saying, "The enemy surrounded the fortress on someday and retreated on someday." ("某日圍城, 某日解去") However, as the fact that they fought against about 3,000 became known soon, Yi Jeong-am was appointed as a governor of Jeolla Province, and Jang Eung-gi, Jo Jong-nam, Jo Seo-ryong, and Bong Yo-sin, who participated in the battle together, were also rewarded with government posts.
