= Sin Kak =

Korean general (?–1592)

- Died: 1592; Joseon
- Cause of death: Execution
- Military career
- Allegiance: Joseon
- Conflicts: Imjin War; Battle of Han River; Battle of Haeyuryŏng

Korean name
- Hangul: 신각
- Hanja: 申恪
- RR: Sin Gak
- MR: Sin Kak

Courtesy name
- Hangul: 경중
- Hanja: 敬仲
- RR: Gyeongjung
- MR: Kyŏngjung

Sin Kak (Korean: 신각; Hanja: 申恪; died in 1592) was a Korean military leader of the mid-Joseon period. A member of the Pyongsan Sin clan, he passed the military examination and held various local and provincial commands. Shortly before the Imjin War he became magistrate of Yŏnan, where, acting on Cho Hŏn's advice, he strengthened Yŏnan Fortress with rebuilt walls, a moat, and hidden water supplies.

At the outbreak of the Imjin War in 1592, Sin was appointed Vice Commander-in-Chief under Kim Myŏngwŏn todefend the Han River. The underprepared Joseon army collapsed against a larger Japanese force, Kim fled, and Sin withdrew through the capital to Yangju with Yi Yangwŏn. Joined there by Yi Hon, they ambushed Japanese troops at Haeyuryŏng, winning one of Joseon's earliest land victories.

However, before news of the victory at Haeyuryŏng reached the court, Kim Myŏngwon accused him of abandoning his post, and Yu Hong and the Border Defense Council ordered Sin's execution. A second Royal Messenger was immediately dispatched to halt the execution, but by the time he arrived, the sentence had already been carried out.

Later writers, including Yu Sŏngnyong and Ku Samaeng, condemned the decision and expressed deep regret over his death. In recognition of his fortification of Yŏnan and his victory at Haeyuryŏng, Sin was posthumously honored through enshrinement and annual memorial rites in Yŏnan and Yangju.

== Early life and career ==
=== Birth and early career ===
Sin Kak was a member of the Pyongsan Sin clan. His father was the civil official Sin Ŭich'ung (신의충; 申義忠), and his mother was a lady of the Jinju Ha clan, daughter of Ha Wŏnno (하원노; 河元老). Sin passed the military service examination and, early in the reign of King Seonjo, served as Magistrate of Yŏnghŭng. In 1574, he was appointed Provincial Naval Commander (수군절도사; 水軍節度使) of Left Kyŏngsang, and in 1576 he became Provincial Military Commander (병마절도사; 兵馬節度使) of Right Kyŏngsang. He later served as Magistrate of Ganghwa in 1586 and as Defense Commander (방어사; 防禦使) of Kyŏngsang Province in 1587, before being appointed Senior Military Protector (상호군; 上護軍).

However, he was dismissed from office on charges of misconduct during his tenure as Magistrate of Yŏnghŭng. At that time, Cho Hŭimeng (조희맹; 趙希孟), Magistrate of Sinch'ang, had requested Sin's assistance in securing an official post for the son of his concubine through napsok (납속; 納粟)—a practice by which one could purchase office by offering grain to the state. Sin, moved by the plea, allegedly provided government grain in his stead, a violation that led to his removal from his post as Senior Military Protector.

=== Fortification of Yŏnan Fortress ===
By 1591, or shortly before, Sin Kak was appointed Magistrate of Yŏnan. In the 3rd lunar month of 1591, anticipating the outbreak of war, Cho Hŏn proposed a series of anti-Japanese defense measures, known as piwaejich'aek (비왜지책; 備倭之策), including the construction of fortified positions. Cho sent a letter to Sin Kak, urging him to strengthen Yŏnan's fortifications, noting that the area had been a frequent target of Japanese incursions since the Koryŏ period. Acting on Cho's advice, Sin reinforced the city walls, dug a defensive moat, diverted stream water from Mount Pibong (비봉산; 飛鳳山) through concealed channels into the fortress, and excavated a pond inside the western gate.

== Imjin War ==
=== Battle of the Han River ===
On the 14th day, 4th lunar month of 1592, the Japanese army attacked Busan. The Joseon court learned of the assault on the 17th day of the 4th lunar month through a military report submitted by Pak Hong, after which Yi Il and Sin Rip were dispatched to confront the invaders. When, however, news arrived on the 29th day of the 4th lunar month that Sin Rip had been defeated at the Battle of Chungju, King Seonjo resolved to flee westward and appointed Kim Myŏngwon as Commander-in-Chief (도원수; 都元帥) and Sin Kak as Vice Commander-in-Chief (부원수; 副元帥), ordering them to defend the Han River.

The Second Division of the Japanese army, led by Katō Kiyomasa, advanced through Chuksan and Yongin and reached the banks of the Han River on the 2nd day of the 5th lunar month. Kim Myŏngwon and Sin Kak established their camp at the pavilion Chech'ŏnjŏng (제천정; 濟川亭), which offered a commanding view of the river, with a force of roughly one thousand men.

However, the Joseon army was at a severe disadvantage both numerically and technologically, facing Japanese troops well equipped with arquebuses. When the Japanese assault reached Chech'ŏnjŏng, Kim Myŏngwon ordered his troops to throw their weapons into the Han River and fled. Sin Kak, rather than following Kim's retreat, entered the capital instead and then withdrew to Yangju with Yi Yangwŏn, the Commander of the Capital Defense Forces (유도대장; 留都大將), who had been charged with defending the city.

=== Battle of Haeyuryŏng ===
Sin Kak and Yi Yangwŏn regrouped their troops at Yangju. They were soon joined there by Yi Hon, the Provincial Military Commander of South Hamgyŏng, who had led his forces southward to help defend the capital, and the three commanders formed a joint encampment. After learning from reports that the Japanese contingent holding Hansŏng was looting the surrounding countryside, they decided to intercept the enemy. The combined force set an ambush at Haeyuryŏng (해유령; 蟹踰嶺), a pass on the road between Yangju and Paju, and on the 16th day, 5th lunar month of 1592 they struck the Japanese column there, using the local topography to their advantage and driving it into a disorderly retreat. After his victory at Haeyuryŏng, Sin Kak joined Yi Yangwŏn in reinforcing the defensive line at Taet'an (대탄; 大灘) on the Imjin River.

=== Death ===
Before the ensuing Battle of the Imjin River, Kim Myŏngwon submitted a memorial to the court accusing Sin Kak of abandoning his position and fleeing on his own accord to follow Yi Yangwŏn, and he requested that Sin be punished. Later historians have generally interpreted Kim's memorial as being motivated by a desire to evade responsibility for the failure of the Han River defense and to justify his own refusal to advance at the Imjin River despite royal orders. Upon reviewing the memorial, Right State Councillor Yu Hong and the Border Defense Council concurred that strict punishment should be imposed on Sin Kak to restore military order and discipline.

On the 18th day of the 5th lunar month, with King Seonjo's approval, the Border Defense Council dispatched a Royal Messenger (선전관; 宣傳官) to the Imjin River to carry out Sin Kak's execution. Soon afterward, however, news of the victory at Haeyuryŏng reached the court, and the Border Defense Council, deeming his merit sufficient to atone for his alleged offense, petitioned the king for clemency. A second Royal Messenger was immediately dispatched to halt the execution, but by the time he arrived, the sentence had already been carried out.

== Legacy ==
=== Reaction to Sin Kak's execution ===
<副元帥申恪次>
莫恨馳宣後命遲 捷音已報九重知
粗酬甄拔蒙恩宥 瞑目應無地下悲

<On Vice Commander-in-Chief Sin Kak>
Do not resent that your honors came late;
the throne already knows your victory.
This barely repays the grace that chose and spared you—
now you may die with no sorrow below.

— Ku Samaeng

The execution of Sin Kak was followed by expressions of sorrow and protest from contemporaries. Yun Kŭnsu and Cho Hŏn both expressed deep regret at what they regarded as his unjust death. In 1594, the licentiate Yu Suk submitted a memorial to the throne declaring Sin's execution unjust, requesting that he be posthumously rehabilitated and promoted in rank. Yu Sŏngnyong likewise wrote in the Chingbirok that Sin's death was the result of errors committed during the earlier chaos of war, while Ku Samaeng and Yi Haesu (이해수; 李海壽) composed elegiac poems mourning him. The later scholar Chŏng Yagyong also lamented Sin's death, writing that “the furious winds of the Yangju plains cry out over his death.”

=== Memorial and posthumous recognition ===
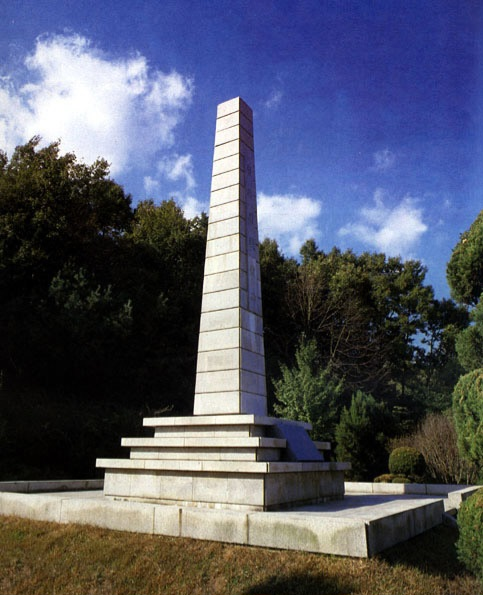
Haeyuryeong Pass Victory Site in Yangju

During the Imjin War, Yi Chŏngam repelled the forces of Kuroda Nagamasa at Yŏnan Fortress, which had been strengthened under Sin Kak's supervision. Yu Sŏngnyong credited this success to Sin's earlier fortification efforts, and Chŏng Yagyong also highly praised his contributions to Yŏnan's defense. In recognition of these merits, Sin Kak was enshrined in 1704 at the Hyŏnch'ungsa Shrine (현충사; 顯忠祠) in Yŏnan, where he is venerated alongside Yi Chŏngam and other figures commemorated for their loyalty.

On 21 April 1977, a monument commemorating the victory at the Battle of Haeyuryŏng was erected in Baekseok-eup, Yangju. In 1991, the Ch'unghyŏnsa Shrine (충현사; 忠顯祠) was established nearby, where the memorial tablets of Sin Kak, Yi Yangwŏn, and Yi Hon are enshrined together. The first commemorative rite was held on 6 April 1980, and since then, annual memorial services have been performed regularly on the 19th day, 5th lunar month to honor Sin Kak, in recognition of his loyalty and valor.
