= Yi Hon (general) =

Korean military leader (1547–1592)

- Born: 1547
- Died: 1592 (aged 44–45); Kapsan, Joseon
- Cause of death: Killed in action
- Burial place: Namyangju, South Korea
- Military career
- Allegiance: Joseon
- Conflicts: Imjin War; Battle of Haeyuryŏng; Battle of Ch'ŏllyŏng

Korean name
- Hangul: 이혼
- Hanja: 李渾
- RR: I Hon
- MR: I Hon

Courtesy name
- Hangul: 중회
- Hanja: 仲晦
- RR: Junghoe
- MR: Chunghoe

Yi Hon (Korean: 이혼; Hanja: 李渾; 1547–1592) was a Korean military commander active during the mid-Joseon period. A member of the Jeonju Yi clan, he passed the military examination and held posts including Provincial Naval Commander of Right Jeolla and Magistrate of Jeju before becoming Provincial Military Commander of South Hamgyŏng.

At the outset of the Imjin War in 1592, Yi raised loyalist forces in Hamgyŏng and then marched south to reinforce the defence of the capital. At Yangju he joined Yi Yangwŏn and Sin Kak, and their combined army ambushed Japanese troops at Haeyuryŏng, securing Joseon's victory.

Subsequently, returning to Hamgyŏng, Yi was tasked with holding the pass at Ch'ŏllyŏng against Katō Kiyomasa and Mori Katsunobu but failed to halt the advance. Amid the province's collapse and local unrest, he was killed by rebellious residents at Kapsan later in 1592.

== Early life ==
Yi Hon was born in 1547. He belonged to a collateral branch of the royal Jeonju Yi clan and was a fifth-generation descendant of Grand Prince Hyoryŏng, a son of King Taejong. His father was Yi Wŏllye (이원례; 李元禮), who had served as Vice Minister (참판; 參判) of Taxation, and his mother was a lady of the Pyongyang Cho clan, daughter of Vice Minister Cho Ki (조기; 趙機). In 1577, Yi Hon passed the irregular military service examination (별시무과; 別試武科) with third-tier honors (병과; 丙科), beginning his official career.

In 1588, while serving as Magistrate of Tanch'ŏn, Yi Hon was dismissed from office on the charge that he had accepted a large amount of silver. In the 1st lunar month of the following year, while serving as Magistrate of Kyŏngwŏn, Yi was recommended by Left Associate State Councilor (좌찬성; 左贊成) Yu Hong when the Border Defense Council introduced a new system allowing the appointment of military officers irrespective of rank order.

Yi later served as Magistrate of Puryŏng and as Provincial Naval Commander (수군절도사; 水軍節度使) of Right Jeolla. On the 16th day, 8th lunar month of 1589, he was appointed Magistrate of Jeju, but was again dismissed from office for irregularities dating back to his tenure in Tanch'ŏn. In 1591, he was appointed Provincial Military Commander (병마절도사; 兵馬節度使) of South Hamgyŏng.

== Imjin War ==
=== Outbreak of the Imjin War ===
On the 14th day, 4th lunar month of 1592, the Imjin War broke out, and the Japanese army advanced rapidly northward toward Hansŏng. In response, on the 30th day of the 4th lunar month, King Seonjo departed westward in flight from the capital, while Prince Imhae set out for Hamgyŏng Province accompanied by Kim Kwiyŏng and Yun T'agyŏn.

After arriving in Hamgyŏng, Prince Imhae issued an official letter on the 8th day, 5th lunar month calling for the recruitment of royal loyalist troops. In accordance with this order, Yu Yŏngnip (유영립; 柳永立), the Provincial Governor (관찰사; 觀察使) of Hamgyŏng, Han Kŭkham, the Provincial Military Commander of North Hamgyŏng, and Yi Hon, the Provincial Military Commander of South Hamgyŏng, were summoned to attend the prince's progress. Yi Hon complied with the summons and, after meeting with Prince Imhae to discuss plans for resistance against the Japanese invasion, led his loyalist troops southward to reinforce the defense of the capital.

=== Battle of Haeyuryŏng ===
During his march, Yi Hon joined forces at Yangju with the retreating armies of Yi Yangwŏn and Sin Kak, who had withdrawn from the Battle of the Han River. There they established a combined camp. Meanwhile, Japanese troops who had entered Hansŏng began pillaging the surrounding countryside, and part of their force advanced northward. In response, Yi Hon, together with Yi Yangwŏn and Sin Kak, took up positions at Haeyuryŏng (해유령; 蟹踰嶺), a strategic pass on the road from Yangju to Paju. The allied commanders concealed their forces within the forests on both sides of the pass and waited in ambush. On the 16th day, 5th lunar month of 1592, they launched a surprise attack on the advancing Japanese troops, making effective use of the terrain and routing the Japanese troops.

=== Battle of Ch'ŏllyŏng ===
After the victory at Haeyuryŏng, Yi Hon returned to Hamgyŏng Province. Yu Yŏngnip (유영립; 柳永立), the Provincial Governor (관찰사; 觀察使) of Hamgyŏng, received intelligence that Japanese forces which had invaded Kangwŏn Province were advancing north and might cross Ch'ŏllyŏng. He therefore assigned Yi Hon a force of approximately one thousand soldiers and ordered him to repel the enemy.

Yi immediately marched south toward Ch'ŏllyŏng, where he established a fortified camp and awaited the enemy's approach. At that time, the Japanese Second Division under Katō Kiyomasa was advancing along the Koksan route, while the Fourth Division under Mori Katsunobu was moving north along the Hoeyang route. Yi, assuming that only the Hoeyang route would be taken, secured only the higher elevations of the pass and sent a small detachment of scouts to the southern slopes.

On the 12th day, 6th lunar month of 1592, approximately four thousand soldiers under Mori Katsunobu approached Ch'ŏllyŏng, advancing northward. The Japanese troops marched in a narrow valley in a long column formation, with numerous banners and the sounds of trumpets and shouts echoing through the gorge, causing Yi's forces to mistake them for a much larger army and lose morale. Upon hearing further reports that another large Japanese force was approaching from the Koksan direction, many of his soldiers fled. Yi himself was unable to mount a defense and retreated, allowing the Japanese to cross Ch'ŏllyŏng without opposition.

=== Death ===
Yi Hon fled to Kapsan to take refuge; however, at that time the region was rife with discontent among the local population, who had long suffered from political isolation, economic hardship, and heavy exploitation. Many residents rose in rebellion and even surrendered to the Japanese, offering their cooperation. While hiding in Kapsan, Yi Hon was ambushed by rebel villagers led by Ki Ch'unyŏn (기춘연; 奇春年) and Pak Yŏnmun (박연문; 朴延文), and in the ensuing skirmish Yi Hon and his son were killed in battle.
