= Yi Chŏngam =

Korean military leader (1541–1600)

- 이정암
- Born: 1541
- Died: September 10, 1600 (aged 58–59)
- Military career
- Allegiance: Joseon
- Branch: Joseon Army
- Rank: Rank 2B; Rank 1A (Posthumous)
- Nickname: Junghun
- Conflicts: Imjin War: Battle of Yonan; Yi Mong-hak's Rebellion Jeongyu War
- Awards: Second rank of Seonmu Merit Subjects

Korean name
- Hangul: 이정암
- Hanja: 李廷馣
- RR: I Jeongam
- MR: I Chŏngam

Courtesy name
- Hangul: 중훈
- Hanja: 仲薰
- RR: Junghun
- MR: Chunghun

Posthumous name
- Hangul: 충목
- Hanja: 忠穆
- RR: Chungmok
- MR: Ch'ungmok

Yi Chŏngam (Korean: 이정암; Hanja: 李廷馣; 1541 – September 10, 1600) was a Korean military official of the mid-Joseon Period.

== Biography ==
=== Birth and Early career ===
Yi Chŏngam was born on August 18, 1541, in Banseokbang, Hanyang. His father was Yi Tang (李宕) and his mother was Lady Kim of Uiseong clan. He passed the licentiate examination in the fall of 1558 and the regular literary examination in 1561 as one of the third-tier passers. He began his career as the proofreader at the Bureau of Diplomatic Documents (승문원부정자), and subsequently served in various administrative roles, including assistant section chief positions in several ministries.

=== Seonjo Period (1567–1601) ===
In March 1567, Yi served as an auditor in Jeolla Province (전라도도사) before returning to the court as an assistant section chief in the Ministry of Justice (형조좌랑). In 1569, he was appointed as a drafter of the Ch'unch'ugwan (춘추관기주관) under the Gyeonggi Provincial Government. The following year, he resumed his role in the Ministry of Justice and also served as a King's Editor (지제교). He was later promoted to Section Chief of Ministry of Military Affairs (병조정랑) and dispatched to Gangwon Province as a secret royal inspector to assess disaster-stricken areas. In 1571, he contributed to the compilation of the Veritable Records of Myeongjong. The following year, he was appointed Second Assistant Master at Sungkyunkwan (성균관사예) and oversaw the Chundangdae examination. In June 1572, he became the prefect of Yonan, where he organized military services.

After serving as prefect of Yonan, Jangdan and Pyongsan, Yi was appointed to the magistrate of Yangju in 1579. During his tenure, he reconstructed Dobong Seowon and local schools, reformed the rice field plans, and implemented the Uniform Land-Tax Law (대동법) throughout Yangju. In 1583, he was selected for positions such as Jangnyeong (장령), Saseong (사성), and Jangakjeong (장악정) when Yi I recruited scholars and established Chansucheong (찬수정). In 1587, he was appointed prefect of Dongnae to defend against the invasion of Japanese incursions. By 1591, he served as royal secretary (승지) and councilor in the Ministries of Public Works and Military Affairs.

=== Japanese invasions of Korea (1592–1598) ===
In January 1592, Yi was appointed councilor in the Ministry of Personnel (이조참의). Following the defeat of Sin Rip at the Battle of Chungju, King Seonjo fled to Pyongan Province, proclaiming Gwanghaegun as crown prince. Yi, unable to join the king's initial retreat, attempted to follow him. On 2 May, he departed for Kaesong with his family, informed by his younger brother, Yi Jeong-hyeong that the king was there. On the same day, when Seonjo awarded new government posts to whom followed him, Yi lost his post as the councilor because he was not there. Choosing not to follow the king, but to defend Kaesong alongside his brother, their plans were thwarted by the collapse of the Imjin River defense line, prompting Yi to leave Kaesong.

Yi then sought refuge in Yonan County, aiming to find boats or reach his younger brother's residence in Haeju. By 2 June, he arrived in Yonan, only to find that local fishermen had already fled. In July, while hiding in a mountain temple, he heard that Seonjo had moved to Uiju, Japanese forces occupied Pyongyang, and Hwanghae Province's people had formed a righteous army lacking a commander.Responding to multiple requests, Yi agreed to lead the militia. In early August, as he organized the militia and strategized, Gwanghaegun appointed him as Suppressor (초토사), granting him authority over local officials and armed forces in Hwanghae province.

On 22 August, Yi entered Yonan Fortress with his militia. When Japanese 3rd Division led by Kuroda Nagamasa attacked, Yi successfully defended the fortress, earning him the governorship of Hwanghae Province. In 1593, he served as Second Minister of Military Affairs (병조참판) and governor of Jeolla Province. Despite his military success, Yi's proposal for peace negotiations led to his impeachment and dismissal. However, he was soon appointed deputy magistrate of Jeonju (전주부윤) in July. In 1596, as a governor of Chungcheong Province, he played a role in suppressing Yi Mong-hak's Rebellion but was dismissed for allegedly punishing prisoners arbitrarily. By December, he concurrently held positions as Fourth Minister of the Office of Ministers-without-Portfolio (동지중추부사) and governor of Hwanghae Province. In 1597, during the Second Japanese Invasion, he defended Suyang Fortress in Haeju as Suppressor of Hwanghae Province. After the invasions, he retired from public service, dedicating his later years to writing at Jeongjujeongsa, a temple in Pungdeok. He died on September 10, 1600.

=== After death ===
After his death, Yi Chŏngam was honored with the title of Wolcheon Buwongun (월천부원군; 月川府院君), enrolled as a second-rank of Seonmu Merit Subjects (선무공신; 宣武功臣), and posthumously appointed to the office of Chwaŭijŏng.

== Writings ==
- Seojeongillok (Korean: 서정일록; Hanja: 西征日錄)
