= Chon Young-ae =

South Korean literary scholar (born 1951)

Chon Young-Ae
- Native name: 전영애
- Born: 1951 (age 74–75) Yeongju, South Korea
- Occupation: Honorary professor at Seoul National University; Translator; German literature scholar and poet
- Language: Korean, German
- Education: Seoul National University (B.A. in German Language and Literature) (M.A. German Language and Literature) (Ph.D. German Language and Literature)
- Notable works: Korean translation of Johann Wolfgang von Goethe's poetry Yeobaek Academy Complex (여백서원); Kafka my Kafka (카프카 나의 카프카 / Kafka mein Kafka)

Korean name
- Hangul: 전영애
- Hanja: 全英愛
- RR: Jeon Yeongae
- MR: Chŏn Yŏngae
- IPA: tɕʌn. jʌŋ.ɛ

Chon Young-Ae (Korean: 전영애; pronounced [tɕʌn. jʌŋ.ɛ]; born 1951) is a literary scholar and poet from South Korea.

She is an honorary professor emeritus in the Department of German Language and Literature at Seoul National University, specializing in German poetry. She held the position of department head from 2005 to 2007. She also served as the president of the Korean Goethe Society from 2006 to 2008. Furthermore, in recognition of her contributions to numerous translations of German literature to the Korean language, she was appointed as the Director of the Literature Translation Institute of Korea in 2012.

Apart from her academic achievements, Chon has been recognized as an accomplished poet as well. She published six volumes of poetry, including some written in German. Her most notable accomplishment is translating all of Johann Wolfgang von Goethe's poems into Korean in 2009, which earned her the Golden Goethe Medal from the Weimar Goethe Society in 2011. Chon is currently working on developing a community known as "Goethe Village".

== Life ==
Chon was born in Yeongju, South Korea in 1951, and went to Gyeonggi Girls' Middle School and Gyeonggi Girls' High School. Later, she enrolled in the College of Liberal Arts at Seoul National University despite the contemporary prejudice against women's education. There, she earned her bachelor's degree in German Language and Literature, in 1973. Chon continued and received her master's degree, in the same department, with her thesis R. M. Rilke의 事物詩 (Dinggedicht): 新詩集을 中心으로 (R.M. Rike의 사물시 (Dinggedicht): 신시집을 중심으로; English: R. M. Rike's thing poem (Dinggedicht): Focusing on the new poetry collection) in 1975. Chon further pursued her studies at the University of Tübingen and the Kiel University in Germany around 1980, but soon returned to her homeland for her young child. After returning to South Korea she revisited her studies at Seoul National University and received her Ph.D., in German Literature and Language, with her dissertation 파울 첼란의 詩에 나타난 苦痛의 形象化 (파울 첼란의 시에 나타난 고통의 형상화; English: The Embodiment of Pain in Paul Chelan's Poem) in 1986.

From 1985 to 1996, Chon served as a professor at Kyungwon University. Over the years, she achieved numerous research accomplishments, serving as the president of the Korean Society of Goethe, as a senior researcher at the Freiburg Institute for Advanced Studies in Germany, and as a researcher at the Weimar Classical Foundation. From 1996 to 2016, she worked as a professor at the Department of German Language and Literature at Seoul National University. After her retirement, Chon has served as an honorary professor at Seoul National University.

Chon has dedicated herself to promoting German literature in South Korea. Currently, she is working on setting up a "Goethe Village," including a building resembling the Weimar Haus, where Goethe stayed in his later years. In an interview with The Korea Times, Chon mentioned that she was working to finish translating all remaining written works by Johann Wolfgang von Goethe, other than poetry she has already translated, within ten years.

== Career ==
- 1987–1996 Professor at Kyungwon University
- 1996–2016 Professor in the Department of German Language and Literature at Seoul National University
- 2005–2007 Head of the Department of German Language and Literature at Seoul National University
- 2006–2008 President of Korean Goethe Society (한국 괴테학회 / Koreanische Goethe-Gesellschaft)
- 2006–2010 Director of Woosan Scholarship Association (우산육영회)
- 2008 Instructor at LMU Munich, Germany
- 2008–2010 Researcher at the University of Freiburg, Germany
- 2012–2015 Director of the Literature Translation Institute of Korea (한국 문학 번역원)
- 2016 to present Honorary Professor in the Department of German Language and Literature at Seoul National University

== Achievements ==
=== Literary works ===
Chon has currently completed more than 60 translations of German literature into the Korean language, including the complete poems in the first volume of Hamburger Ausgabe, Dichtung und Wahrheit /Poetry and Truth (Part I &II) by Johann Wolfgang von Goethe, Demian (Die Geschichte von Emil Sinclairs Jugend) by Hermann Hesse, and Metamorphosis (Die Verwandlung) by Franz Kafka. These three translations are notable for being the first complete translations of German literature into Korean.

Chon also wrote poetry and books in both the German and Korean languages. She attempted various poetic variations, using common poetic features, such as relationship between God and humans, nature and family, and compassion and pain as the themes of her poetry. One of Chon's well-known original works is 'Kafka My Kafka' published in 1994, which was written after she completed the translation of two of Kafka's works. In this work, Chon wrote about her journey to Prague, Kafka's hometown, and transformed it into a poem. This work serves not only as an expression of her musings on Kafka but also as a depiction of her own literary realization. She translated this work into German with the German title Kafka mein Kafka.

=== Golden Goethe Medal ===
Chon won the Golden Goethe Medal (Goldene Goethe-Medaille) from the Weimar Goethe Society in Germany, in 2011. The Golden Goethe Medal is renowned as being the most honorable award for those working in the field of German literature and is awarded to researchers biennially; most of the winners have been Germans. Chon was awarded this honorable medal as the first Asian woman in recognition of her many meaningful studies on German literature and translations. In one of her interviews, Chon mentioned that "It was the result of a comprehensive evaluation of all of my translations, papers, and writings." In her acceptance speech, she humbly promised to continue to make a contribution to the translation and studies of German literature to become more qualified for the award. Besides the Golden Goethe Medal, Chon received several awards both in Germany and South Korea throughout her career, such as the Reiner Kunze Award and the Women's Creation Award. The Women's Creation Award is an award given to the most influential females in the field of literature in South Korea.

=== New teaching methods ===
She received the Excellence in Teaching Award from Seoul National University for introducing new teaching methods such as debate, joint recitals, weekend membership training, and creating "one's textbook". The adaptation of these new teaching methods aimed to encourage the active participation of students during class. Throughout her years as a professor, Chon hosted a class (titled "Understanding Masterpieces in German Literature"), where she led students to develop creative ways for peer teaching and acted as a facilitator instead of an instructor. This teaching style was not common during that time in Korean classrooms, where students were expected to listen quietly to the lecturing instructor.

=== Yeobaek Academy Complex ===
One of Chon's most remarkable achievements is building the Yeobaek Academy Complex (여백서원), which is a place where everyday citizens can experience literature. She intended the Complex to serve as a place where people could come at any time to take a breath, look back on themselves, and look back on the world. She has been solely responsible for the management of the complex.

She is also designing a new initiative called "Goethe Village." The Goethe Village is an extended version of the Yeobaek Academy that includes a Goethe gallery and an astronomical observatory. The village also consists of small bungalows for meditation and features a building that resembles the Weimar Haus, the place where Goethe spent his final years. Once completed, the Goethe Village is expected to offer a first-hand experience for visitors to explore the life and works of Goethe. This complex will be open to anyone who wants to experience the traditional Korean literary customs and the classical German literary world.

== Selected publications ==
Some of Chon's well-known works include the following:

=== Monographs ===
- The Portrayal of Suffering in Paul Celan's Poetry. (어두운 시대와 고통의 언어 - 파울 첼란의 시, 1986)
- Kafka, My Kafka (카프카 나의 카프카, 1994) ISBN 978-89-374-0571-6
- Contemporary German Literature: Reflections on the Division and Unification of the Country. (독일의 현대문학: 분단과 통일의 성찰, 1998) ISBN 89-364-1158-6
- A Letter from Weimar, Goethe's City (괴테의 도시 바이마르에서 온 편지, 1999) ISBN 978-89-320-1064-9
- Rainbow for Franz Kafka. (프란츠 카프카를 위한 무지개/ Regenbogen für Franz Kafka., 2005) ISBN 3-931883-46-9
- Goethe and Ballade (괴테와 발라데, 2007) ISBN 978-89-521-0764-0
- Poet's House (시인의 집, 2015) ISBN 978-89-546-4121-0

=== Translations ===
- Poems (all poems in the first volume of the Hamburg edition / Gedichte) by Johann Wolfgang von Goethe
- Poetry and Truth by Johann Wolfgang von Goethe
- Faust by Johann Wolfgang von Goethe
- Lindennacht by Reiner Kunze
- Poems by Reiner Kunze
- Sensitive Ways & The Wonderful Years by Reiner Kunze
- The notes of Malte Laurids Brigge by Rainer Maria Rilke
- Reflections on Christa T. by Christa Wolf
- The Divided Heaven by Christa Wolf
- Germany. History in Pictures by André Maurois
- Demian by Hermann Hesse
- Metamorphosis by Franz Kafka
- 2011 Excellence in Teaching Award from Seoul National University SNU Awards 학술연구 교육상(교육 부문)
- 2011 Golden Goethe Medal (Goldene Goethe-Medaille) from the Weimar Goethe Society
- 2011 Excellence in Teaching Award from Seoul National University SNU Awards 학술연구 교육상(교육 부문)
- 2020 Women's Creation Award from Samsung Happiness for Tomorrow Awards 삼성행복대상 여성창조상
- 2022 Reiner Kunze Award in German 라이너 쿤체상
- 2022 11th Li Mirok Award from Korean-German Society 제11회 이미륵상 – 한독협회
