= Invasion of Korea =

Invasion of Korea may refer to:

- Mongol invasions of Korea (1231, 1232, 1235–1239, 1251, 1254, 1255, 1257, 1290–1291)
- Red Turban invasions of Goryeo (1359–1360)
- Japanese invasions of Korea (1592–1598)
- Later Jin invasion of Joseon (1627)
- Qing invasion of Joseon (1636–1637)

== See also ==
- Sino-Korean War
- Korean War
- List of wars involving Korea
