= List of wars involving North Korea =

This is a list of wars involving North Korea since 1948, when the Korean peninsula was de facto divided into North Korea (Democratic People's Republic of Korea, DPRK) and South Korea (Republic of Korea, ROK).

- For wars involving united Korea until 1948, see List of wars involving Korea until 1948
- For wars involving South Korea since 1948, see List of wars involving South Korea

== List of wars involving North Korea: 1948–present ==
| Conflict | North Korea and its allies | Opponents | Results | North Korean losses | | North Korea leader |
| Conflict | North Korea and its allies | Opponents | Results | Military | Civilian | North Korea leader |
North Korea
| Korean War (1950–1953) | North Korea: China; Soviet Union | South Korea; United Nations (Note: On 9 July 1951 troop constituents were: US: 70.4%; ROK: 23.3%; other UNC: 6.3%.): United States; United Kingdom; Canada; Turkey; Australia; Philippines; New Zealand; Thailand; Ethiopia; Greece; France; Colombia; Belgium; South Africa; Netherlands; Luxembourg; West Germany; Italy; Norway; Sweden; Denmark; India; Japan | Inconclusive: Korean Demilitarized Zone established; North Korea gains the city of Kaesong, but loses a net total of 3,900 km^{2} (1,506 sq mi), including the city of Sokcho, to South Korea | 215,000– 350,000 | 1,550,000 | Kim Il Sung |
| Ogaden War 1977–1978 | Somalia WSLF Supported by: Egypt Saudi Arabia Iraq | Ethiopia Cuba Soviet Union South Yemen Supported by: Israel East Germany North Korea | Victory: Somalia breaks all ties with the Soviet Bloc (except China and Romania).; Beginning of the Somali Rebellion | Unknown | Unknown | Kim Il Sung |
| Vietnam War (1955–1975) | North Vietnam; Viet Cong and PRG; Pathet Lao; Khmer Rouge; GRUNK (1970–1975); China (1965–1973); Soviet Union; North Korea | South Vietnam; United States; South Korea; Australia; New Zealand; Laos; Cambodia (1967–1970); Khmer Republic (1970–1975); Thailand | Victory: Reunification of North Vietnam and South Vietnam into the Socialist Republic of Vietnam in 1976 | 14 | None | Kim Il Sung |
| Korean DMZ Conflict (1966–1969) | North Korea | South Korea; United States | Defeat: Status quo ante bellum | 397 | Unknown | Kim Il Sung |
| 1971 JVP insurrection (1971) | JVP; Supported by: North Korea | Ceylon: (Dominion of Ceylon) Sri Lankan Coalition (from 15 May); SLFP; CCP (Pro-Soviet); LSSP; Military intervention: India; Pakistan; Soviet Union | Defeat: The JVP controlled Ceylon's Southern Province and Sabaragamuwa Province for several weeks; Rebel leaders were captured and the remaining members surrendered; Ceylonese government re-established control of the entire island; Expulsion of North Korean diplomats | Unknown killed Several arrested | Unknown | Kim Il Sung |
| Yom Kippur War (1973) | Egypt; Syria; Expeditionary forces Saudi Arabia Algeria Jordan Libya Iraq Kuwait Tunisia Morocco Cuba North Korea | Israel | Defeat: Syrian invasion of Israel repelled.; Israel–Syria Disengagement Agreement; Geneva Conference and the Sinai II Agreement; Strategic political gains for Egypt and Israel | None | None | Kim Il Sung |
| Angolan Civil War (1975–2002) | People's Republic of Angola/Republic of Angola: MPLA; Cuba (1975–1989); SWAPO (1975–1989); ANC (1975–1989); Executive Outcomes (1993–1995); FLNC (1975–2001); Namibia (2001–2002) (Note: Irritated by UNITA cross-border raids, the Namibian Defence Force retaliated by sending units into southern Angola and destroying a UNITA training camp at Licua in late January 2001. The Namibian troops were not withdrawn from Angola until May 2002.) Military advisers and pilots: Soviet Union (1975–1989); East Germany (1975–1989); North Korea (1980s) (Note: The North Korean Military Mission in Angola had about 1,500 personnel attached to FAPLA in 1986, most likely advisers, although their exact duties are uncertain. Their presence in Angola may have been indirectly subsidised by the Soviet Union. Up to 3,000 North Korean military personnel served in Angola throughout the 1980s.) | Democratic People's Republic of Angola: UNITA; FNLA (1975–1976); FNLA (1976–1978); South Africa (1975–1989); Zaire (1975) FLEC | Victory: Withdrawal of all foreign forces in 1989.; Transition towards a multiparty political system in 1991/92.; Dissolution of the armed forces of the FNLA.; Participation of UNITA and FNLA, as political parties, in the new political system, from 1991/92 onwards.; Jonas Savimbi, leader of UNITA, killed in 2002; UNITA abandoned armed struggle and participated in electoral politics.; Resistance of FLEC continued to this day | Unknown | Unknown | Kim Il Sung |
| Ugandan Bush War (1980–1986) | (Uganda) Ugandan government: UNLF/UPC; FEDEMU (from 1985); FUNA (from 1985); UNRF (I) (from 1985); UFM (from 1985); Tanzania (until 1985); North Korea (1981–1985); Zaire (1986, alleged) | National Resistance Movement (NRM): PRA; UFF; (Uganda) West Nile rebels: Uganda Army (1980); UNRF (I) (1980–85); FUNA (1980–85); Nile Regiment; (Uganda) UFM (1980–83) (Uganda) FEDEMU (1983–85) (Uganda) ULM (Uganda) UNLF-AD Rwenzururu movement (until 1982); Karamojong groups | Defeat: Yoweri Museveni becomes President of Uganda; Civil war de facto continues | 700 | Unknown | Kim Il Sung |
| Battle of Amami-Ōshima (2001) | North Korea | Japan | Defeat: North Korean naval trawler sunk | 15; 1 naval trawler sunk | None | Kim Jong Il |
| Yemeni Civil War (2015–present) | Supreme Political Council: Houthis; Pro-Saleh forces (until 2017); Some Popular Committees; Sana'a-GPC forces; Alleged support: Iran; Hezbollah; North Korea | Hadi government: Pro-Hadi Security forces; Yemen National Army (YNA); Al-Islah; Popular Resistance Committees; Popular Committees; Southern Movement; Strategic Reserve (pro-Hadi Saleh forces); Saudi-led coalition Saudi Arabia; United Arab Emirates; Senegal; Sudan; Morocco; Qatar (2015–17); Academi security contractors Under 1,000 troops: Bahrain; Egypt; Kuwait; Jordan; (United States) Green Berets (France) French Army Special Forces Command; Al-Qaeda; Academi Support: United Kingdom; France; United States; Spain; NATO; Southern Transitional Council (from 2017); Tareq Saleh forces (from 2017): National Resistance; Tihamah Resistance; Support: United Arab Emirates; Ansar al-Sharia: AQAP; (Islamic State) ISIL-YP | Ongoing: Houthis dissolve Yemeni government; Houthis take control of northern Yemen; Conflict in Najran, Jizan and Asir | Unknown | Unknown | Kim Jong Un |
| Russian invasion of Ukraine (2022–present); Kursk campaign | Russia; Donetsk PR (Note: The Donetsk People's Republic and the Luhansk People's Republic were Russian puppet states, having declared their independence from Ukraine in May 2014. Several months into the invasion, Russia declared that it had formally annexed both entities in September 2022. They continue to exist as republics of Russia.); Luhansk PR; North Korea (Note: North Korean troops have widely been reported as fighting in this war since October 2024.) (October 2024 – January 2025 per Ukraine); Supported by: Belarus (Note: In 2022, Belarus allowed Russia to use its territory to launch the invasion and to launch missiles into Ukraine.) | Ukraine Support: USA UK German France Poland Germany's Kiel Institute for the World Economy: Also maintains an authoritative tracker of aid to Ukraine. | Ongoing: Russian annexation of Donetsk, Kherson, Luhansk and Zaporizhzhia oblasts | 600 | None | Kim Jong Un |

== See also ==
- Korean People's Army – military of North Korea
- List of wars involving Korea until 1948
- List of wars involving South Korea (since 1948)

== Sources ==
- Cooper, Tom; Fontanellaz, Adrien (2015). Wars and Insurgencies of Uganda 1971–1994. Solihull: Helion & Company Limited. ISBN 978-1-910294-55-0.
- Golooba-Mutebi, Frederick (January 2008). "Collapse, War and Reconstruction in Uganda. An analytical narrative on state-making" (PDF). Makerere University Crisis States Working Papers Series (2). ISSN 1749-1800.
- O'Ballance, Edgar (1979). No Victor, No Vanquished: The Yom Kippur War (1979 ed.). Barrie & Jenkins. pp. 28–370. ISBN 978-0-214-20670-2.
- Rabinovich, Abraham (2004). The Yom Kippur War: The Epic Encounter That Transformed the Middle East. New York: Schocken Books. ISBN 978-0-8052-4176-1.
- Seftel, Adam, ed. (2010) [1st pub. 1994]. Uganda: The Bloodstained Pearl of Africa and Its Struggle for Peace. From the Pages of Drum. Kampala: Fountain Publishers. ISBN 978-9970-02-036-2.
- Uganda: Obote's Dimming Prospects (PDF) (Report). Langley, Virginia: Central Intelligence Agency. 2012 [1st pub. 1984]. Archived from the original (PDF) on January 23, 2017.
