= Haeju Airport =

Haeju Airport 해주비행장
- IATA: none; ICAO: none

Summary
- Airport type: Military/Public
- Operator: Korean People's Army and Air Koryo
- Location: Haeju, South Hwanghae, North Korea
- Elevation AMSL: 40 ft (12 m)
- Coordinates: 38°00′23.60″N 125°46′43.80″E

Map
- Location within North Korea Location within Asia Location within North Pacific Location within Earth

Runways
Direction	Length		Surface
Direction	m	ft	Surface
12/30	2,000	6,562	Grass

- Haeju Airport
- Hangul: 해주비행장
- Hanja: 海州飛行場
- RR: Haeju bihaengjang
- MR: Haeju pihaengjang

Haeju Airport is an airport located in Haeju, South Hwanghae, North Korea. Haeju Airport is controlled by the Korean People's Army. The airport mainly operates military flights but also has a limited number of civilian flights. This airport is notorious to South Korean intelligence authorities, because former North Korean Intelligence agents frequently use it as a transfer point. The single runway 12/30 is 6562x289 ft (2000x88 m).

== History ==
In the period from June 1946 to November 1948 it was used as a base for parts of the 250th Fighter Division. During the Korean War, the US Army designated as K-19. During the Korean War the USAF designated the airfield as K-19.
