= Haeju =

Haeju 해주시
- Municipal City

Korean transcription(s)
  - Chosŏn'gŭl: 해주시
  - Hancha: 海州市
  - McCune-Reischauer: Haeju-si
  - Revised Romanization: Haeju-si
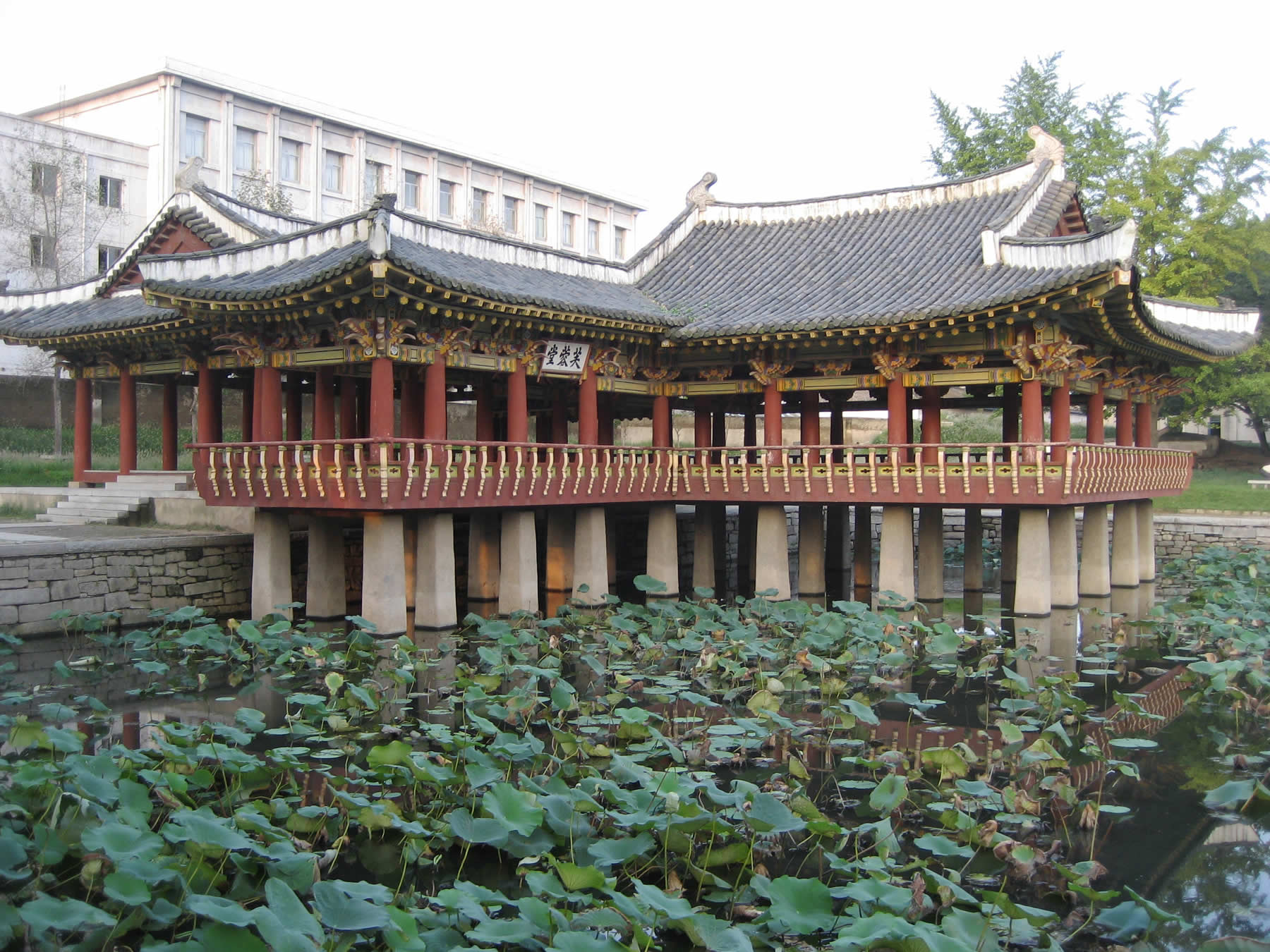
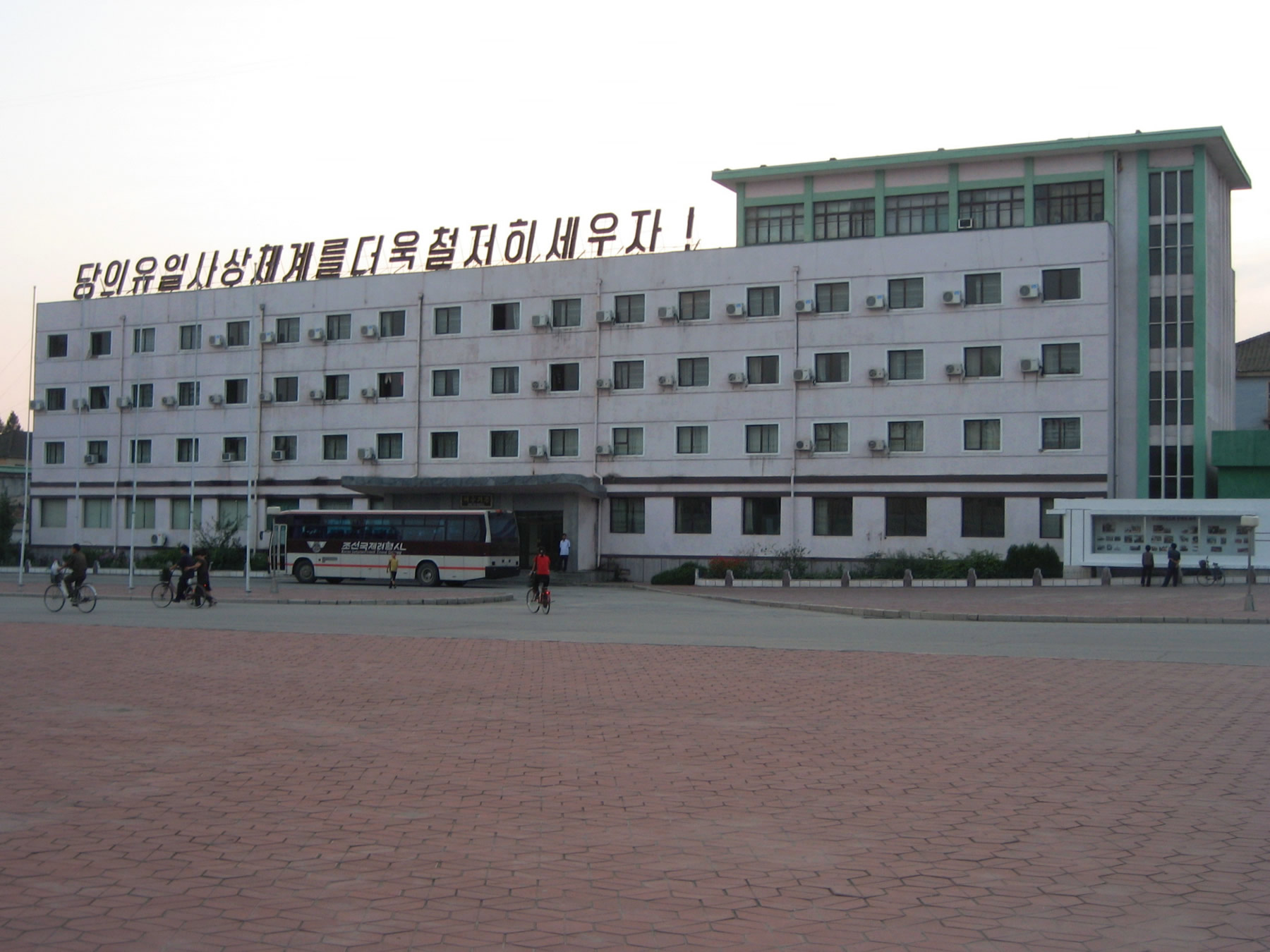
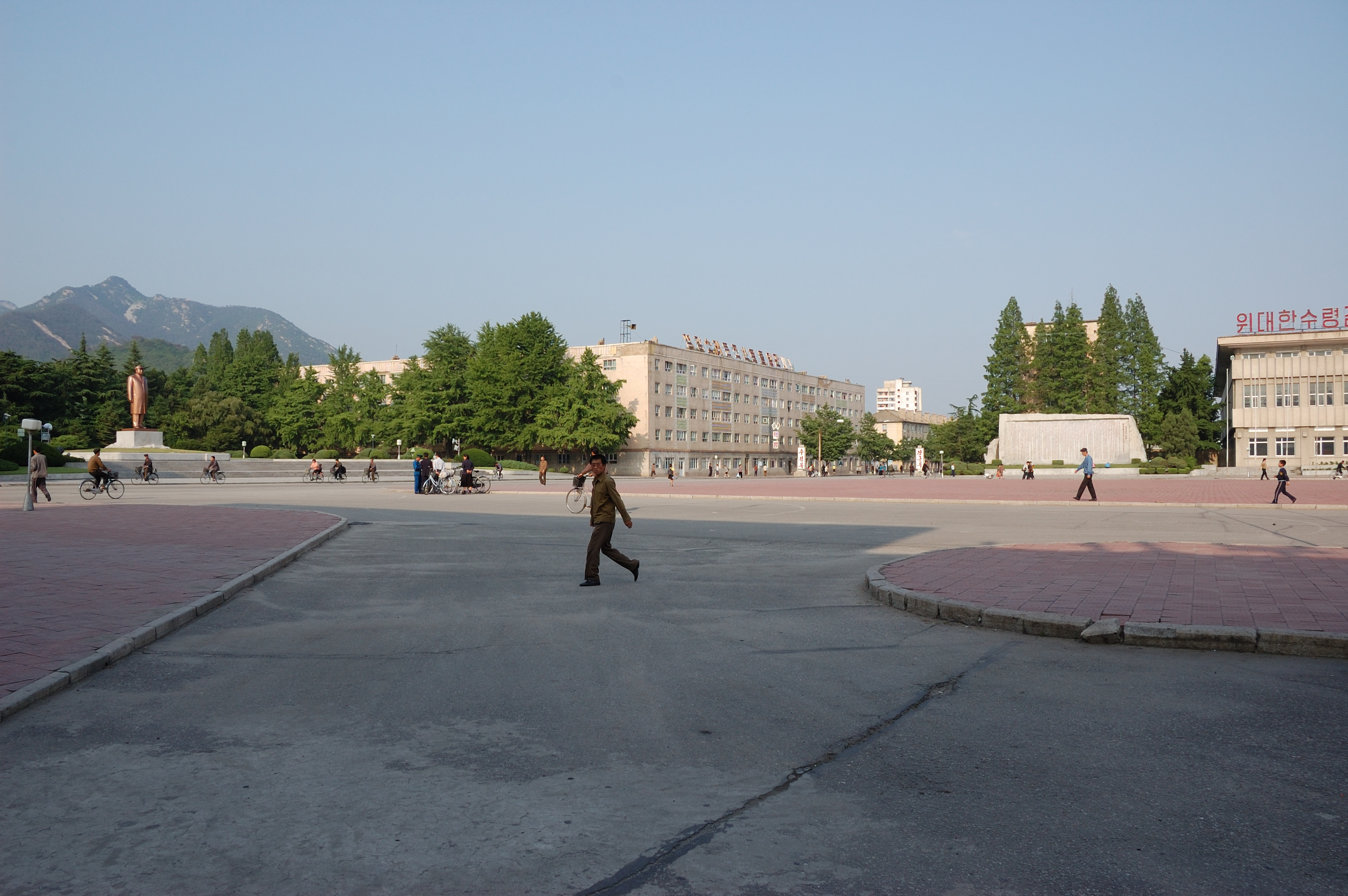
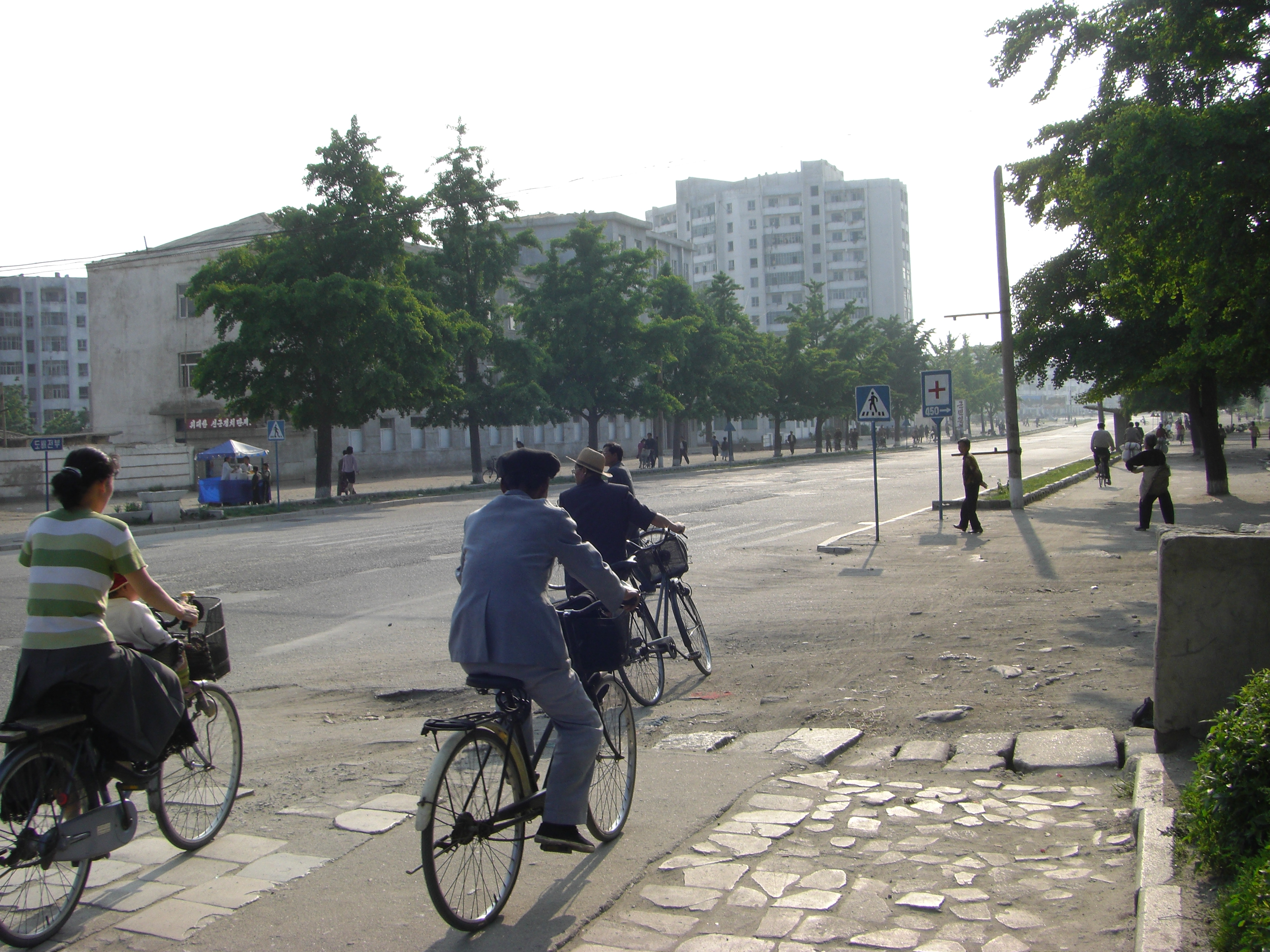
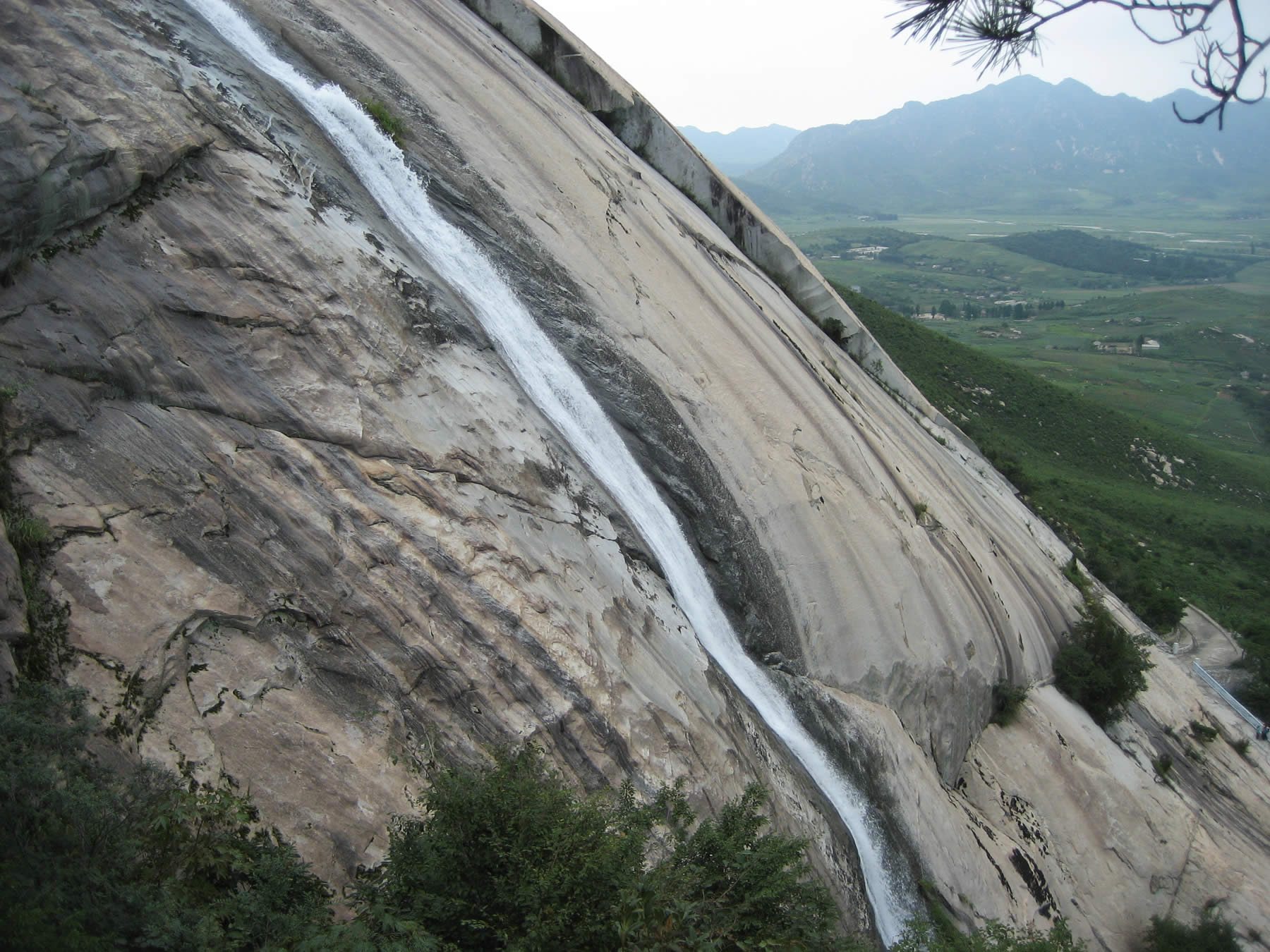
- Puyong Pavilion Haeju hotel City square in Haeju Street in Haeju Suyangsan Falls

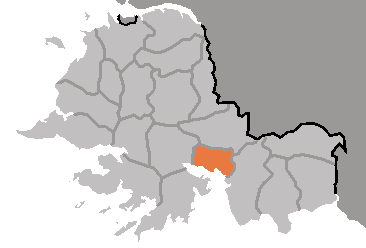
- Map of South Hwanghae showing the location of Haeju
- Interactive map of Haeju
- Location within North Korea
- Coordinates: 38°3′N 125°43′E
- Country: North Korea
- Province: South Hwanghae
- Administrative divisions: 25 tong, 4 ri

Area
  - Total: 206.9 km^{2} (79.9 sq mi)

Population (2008)
  - Total: 273,300
  - Dialect: Hwanghae
- Time zone: UTC+9 (Pyongyang Time)

Haeju (Note: In the 19th century, Haeju was sometimes spelled Hai-tsiou.) (Korean pronunciation: [hɛ.dzu]) is a city located in South Hwanghae Province near Haeju Bay in North Korea. It is the administrative centre of South Hwanghae Province. As of 2008, the population of the city is estimated to be 273,300. At the beginning of the 20th century, it became a strategic port in Sino-Korean trade. Haeju has chemical-related enterprises and a cement factory.

== History ==
The area around Haeju is known to have been inhabited since the Neolithic period, as shellmounds, pottery, and stone tools have been found at Ryongdangp'o. During the early Three kingdoms period, it was briefly governed by a small chieftain, when it was known as "Naemihol" (內米忽郡). In 757, however, it was conquered by the Goguryeo kingdom, who later lost it to Silla. It was under the Goryeo dynasty's King T'aejo that it received its current name.

Sohyon Academy (소현서원) was a Confucian academy founded near Haeju by the famous Joseon dynasty scholar Yi I (1536–84) after his retirement. It is situated in Unbyong Valley, a part of Soktamgugok (Nine valleys of pools and rocks).

According to the North Korean government, their southward offensive on the first day of the Korean War on 25 June 1950 was a response to a two-day long bombing by the South Koreans and their surprise attacks on Haeju and other places. Early in the morning of 25 June, before the dawn counterattack in the North Korean account, the South Korean Office of Public Information announced that the Southern forces had captured Haeju. The South Korean government later denied capturing the town and blamed the report on an exaggerating officer. Yugoslavia and the Soviet Union proposed that North Korea would be invited to the UN Security Council to present its side of the story. Both proposals were voted down.

== Geography ==
Haeju City is located on the westernmost edge of the Korean Peninsula, 60 km north of the Military Demarcation Line and 100 km south of Pyongyang. The city, being not very mountainous, is composed mostly of plains. All the mountains located within the city are under 1,000 m in elevation.

=== Mountains ===
- Mountain Suyang, 946 m.
- Mountain Jangdae, 686 m.
- Nam Hill, 122 m.

== Climate ==
Haeju has a humid continental climate (Köppen climate classification: Dwa), with cold, dry winters and hot, humid summers.

Climate data for Haeju (1991–2020 normals, extremes 1957–present)
Month	Jan	Feb	Mar	Apr	May	Jun	Jul	Aug	Sep	Oct	Nov	Dec	Year
Record high °C (°F)	12.0 (53.6)	14.7 (58.5)	22.9 (73.2)	27.7 (81.9)	34.5 (94.1)	36.0 (96.8)	36.0 (96.8)	37.2 (99.0)	34.0 (93.2)	29.6 (85.3)	25.0 (77.0)	17.2 (63.0)	37.2 (99.0)
Mean daily maximum °C (°F)	1.6 (34.9)	4.1 (39.4)	9.7 (49.5)	16.3 (61.3)	21.7 (71.1)	25.6 (78.1)	27.3 (81.1)	29.0 (84.2)	25.7 (78.3)	19.7 (67.5)	11.2 (52.2)	3.7 (38.7)	16.3 (61.3)
Daily mean °C (°F)	−2.7 (27.1)	−0.4 (31.3)	4.8 (40.6)	11.2 (52.2)	16.7 (62.1)	21.3 (70.3)	24.1 (75.4)	25.3 (77.5)	21.1 (70.0)	14.6 (58.3)	6.8 (44.2)	−0.3 (31.5)	11.9 (53.4)
Mean daily minimum °C (°F)	−6.6 (20.1)	−4.5 (23.9)	0.5 (32.9)	6.6 (43.9)	12.2 (54.0)	17.6 (63.7)	21.4 (70.5)	22.1 (71.8)	17.0 (62.6)	9.9 (49.8)	2.8 (37.0)	−4.0 (24.8)	7.9 (46.2)
Record low °C (°F)	−18.9 (−2.0)	−19.0 (−2.2)	−12.0 (10.4)	−6.1 (21.0)	0.0 (32.0)	2.0 (35.6)	10.9 (51.6)	9.8 (49.6)	2.3 (36.1)	−4.7 (23.5)	−11.1 (12.0)	−18.0 (−0.4)	−19.0 (−2.2)
Average precipitation mm (inches)	9.6 (0.38)	17.6 (0.69)	27.5 (1.08)	51.4 (2.02)	108.7 (4.28)	108.0 (4.25)	305.2 (12.02)	252.8 (9.95)	96.2 (3.79)	42.6 (1.68)	34.8 (1.37)	15.0 (0.59)	1,069.4 (42.10)
Average precipitation days (≥ 0.1 mm)	3.8	3.1	4.0	5.6	7.1	8.0	12.9	10.4	5.5	4.4	5.9	5.2	75.9
Average snowy days	5.5	3.3	1.2	0.1	0.0	0.0	0.0	0.0	0.0	0.1	2.1	5.9	18.2
Average relative humidity (%)	65.2	62.4	63.9	64.6	70.6	77.0	85.5	80.9	72.9	68.0	69.6	68.1	70.7
Mean monthly sunshine hours	188	184	213	224	235	197	133	188	210	215	164	169	2,320
Source 1: Korea Meteorological Administration
Source 2: Deutscher Wetterdienst (sun, 1961–1990), (Note: Station ID for Haeju is 47069 Use this station ID to locate the sunshine duration) Meteo Climat (extremes)

== Administrative divisions ==
Haeju is divided into several urban neighborhoods ("dong") and several rural villages ("ri").

	Chosŏn'gŭl	Hancha
Changch'un-dong	장춘동	長春洞
Haech'ŏng-dong	해청동	海清洞
Haeun-dong	해운동	海運洞
Hakhyŏn-dong	학현동	鶴峴洞
Kuje-dong	구제동	九齊洞
Kwangha-dong	광하동	廣河洞
Kwangsŏk-tong	광석동	廣石洞
Kyŏlsŏng-dong	결성동	結城洞
Namsan-dong	남산동	南山洞
Okkye-dong	옥계동	玉溪洞
Puyong-dong	부용동	芙蓉洞
Ryongdang-dong	룡당동	龍塘洞
Saegŏri-dong	새거리동	새거리洞
Sami-dong	사미동	四美洞
Sansŏng-dong	산성동	山城洞
Sŏae-dong	서애동	西艾洞
Sŏkch'ŏn-dong	석천동	石川洞
Sŏkmi-dong	석미동	石美洞
Sŏnsan-dong	선산동	仙山洞
Sŭngma-dong	승마동	乘馬洞
Taegok-tong	대곡동	大谷洞
Ŭpp'a-dong	읍파동	邑波洞
Yangsa-dong	양사동	養社洞
Yŏnggwang-dong	영광동	榮光洞
Yŏnha-dong	연하동	煙下洞
Chakch'ŏl-li	작천리	鵲川里
Changbang-ri	장방리	長芳里
Singwang-ri	신광리	神光里
Yŏngyang-ri	영양리	迎陽里

== Culture and travel ==
Famous tourist attractions in the city center include Puyong Pavilion, the Haeju Dharani Monument, the Haeju Sokbinggo, and several trees classified as living monuments. Farther out, scenic spots include Suyangsan Falls, the Sokdamgugok scenic area, Suyangsan Fortress and the Sohyon Academy.

== Economy ==
Haeju Special Economic Zone was announced in the Second Inter-Korean summit meeting between the South Korean president Roh Moo-Hyun and the North Korean supreme leader Kim Jong-Il. It was to be a Special Economic Zone centered on the Haeju port. The zone would have consisted of 16.5 km^{2} of development, and also the expansion of the Haeju port. This project was estimated to cost over US$4.5 billion.

This economic agreement between South Korea and North Korea would have allowed trading across the Northern Limit Line between the ports of Incheon and Haeju, only 110 km apart. Recent military skirmishes make any revival of this deal unlikely for the time being.

== Transportation ==
Haeju has a military and civilian dual purposes air station (HAE), with a 12/30 runway (Haeju Airport). Haeju also has one of the major economic and military ports in North Korea. It is connected to Sariwŏn via the Hwanghae Ch'ŏngnyŏn Line of the Korean State Railway.

== Education ==
Haeju is home to Haeju University of Education, Haeju College of Art, and Kim Je Won Haeju University of Agriculture. Sohyon Academy (소현서원) was a Confucian academy founded by the famous scholar Yi Yulgok (1536–84). It is situated in the Unbyong Valley west of Haeju.

== Media ==
The Korean Central Broadcasting Station airs on AM 1080 kHz using a 1.5-megawatt mediumwave transmitter.

== Sister cities ==
- Guaranda, Ecuador
- Ulan-Ude, Russia

== People born in Haeju ==
- Ch'oe Ch'ung (984–1068), Confucian scholar and poet
- Ch'oe Yun-ŭi (1102–1162), Confucian scholar
- Choe Manri (d. 1445), minister of Hall of Worthies
- Injo of Joseon (1595–1649), the sixteenth king of the Joseon dynasty in Korea
- Syngman Rhee, the first president of South Korea
- Kim Ku (1876–1949), last president of the Provisional Government of the Republic of Korea
- An Jung-geun (1879–1910), independence activist who assassinated Itō Hirobumi
- Mirok Li (1899–1950), writer
- Kang Joon-ho (1928–1990), bronze-medalist Olympic boxer (1952)
- Jong Song-ok (1974), marathon gold-medalist & Olympic runner

Haeju is the home of the Haeju Choi and the Haeju Oh clan.

== See also ==
- List of cities in North Korea

== Notes ==
=== Bibliography ===
- "Corea" , Encyclopædia Britannica, 9th ed., Vol. VI, New York: Charles Scribner's Sons, 1878, pp. 390–394.
