= Puyong Hall =

Historic structure in Haeju, North Korea

Coordinates: 38°2′36″N 125°42′11″E

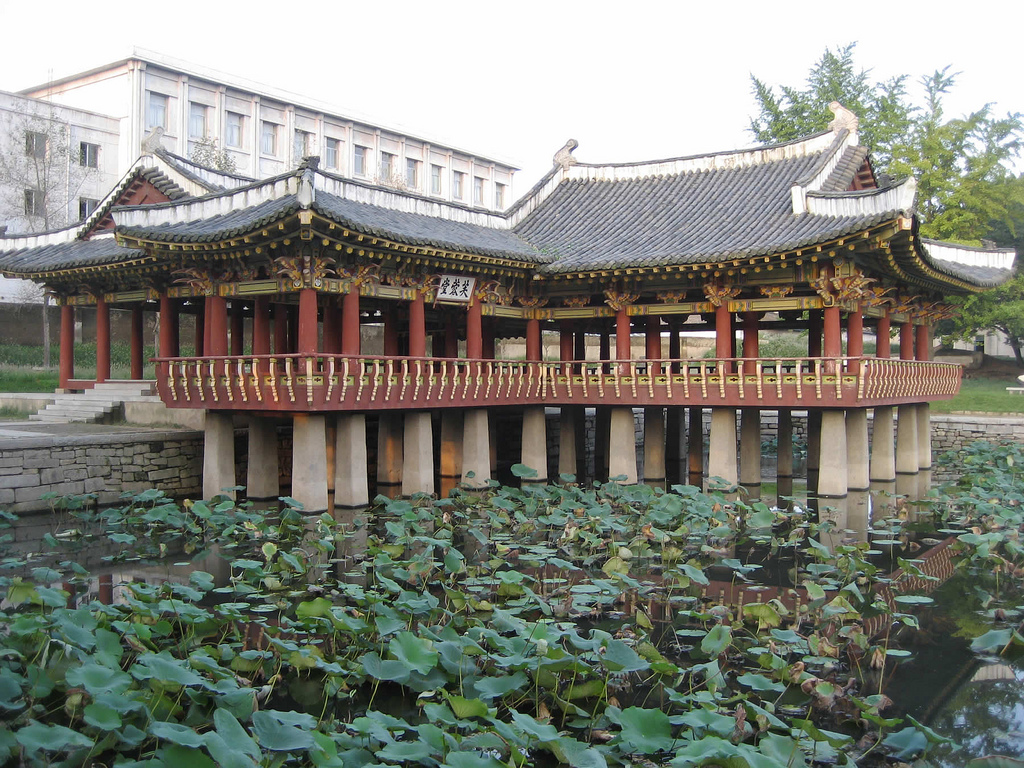
Puyong Hall

Puyong Hall (Korean: 부용당; Hanja: 芙蓉堂) is a historic structure located in Puyong-dong, Haeju, North Korea. The gable-roof pavilion features railings around the perimeter. It stands in a lotus pond, supported by stone pillars. First built in 1500, it was located in front of the Yong Gate. In 1526, it was expanded into the pond. The structure was destroyed during the Korean War, but later rebuilt by the ruling party Korean Workers' Party.

The pond in which it sits carries a legend: "According to it, the local folks could not sleep because the frogs were croaking day and night. A general surnamed Nam who was concerned about this fact wrote some words on a piece of paper and threw it into the pond. Since then the frogs stopped croaking and the folks had a sound sleep."
