= List of wars involving South Korea =

This is a list of wars involving South Korea since 1948, when the Korean peninsula was de facto divided into South Korea (Republic of Korea, ROK) and North Korea (Democratic People's Republic of Korea, DPRK).

- For wars involving united Korea until 1948, see List of wars involving Korea until 1948
- For wars involving North Korea since 1948, see List of wars involving North Korea (since 1948)

== List of wars involving South Korea: 1948–present ==
Conflict	South Korea and its allies	Opponents	Results	South Korean losses		President of South Korea
Conflict	South Korea and its allies	Opponents	Results	Military	Civilian	President of South Korea
South Korea
Korean War (1950–1953)	South Korea; United Nations Command: United States; United Kingdom; Canada; Australia; New Zealand; Turkey; Philippines; Thailand; Ethiopia; Greece; France; Colombia; Belgium; South Africa; Netherlands; Luxembourg	North Korea; China; Soviet Union	Stalemate: North Korean invasion of South Korea repelled, UN invasion of North Korea repelled, Chinese invasion of South Korea repelled.; Korean Armistice Agreement signed.; Korean Demilitarized Zone established, little territorial change at the 38th parallel border.			Syngman Rhee
Vietnam War (South Korean involvement: (Note: See also South Korea in the Vietnam War.) 1965–1973)	South Vietnam; United States; South Korea; Australia; New Zealand; Laos; Cambodia; Khmer Republic; Thailand; Philippines	North Vietnam; Viet Cong (Laos) Pathet Lao; Khmer Rouge; China; Soviet Union; North Korea	Defeat: South Korean deployment of over 350,000 combat troops; 5,000 lost their lives; Withdrawal of American forces from Indochina in 1973; North Vietnamese victory over South Vietnam in 1975; Dissolution of the South Vietnamese state; Communist regimes take power in South Vietnam, Cambodia, and Laos	5,000		Park Chung-hee
Korean DMZ Conflict (1966–1969)	South Korea; United States	North Korea	Victory: North Korean failure to instigate an armed insurgency in South Korea			Park Chung-hee
Gwangju Uprising (1980)	South Korea	Gwangju citizenry	Victory: Uprising suppressed			Chun Doo-hwan
Gulf War (1990–1991)	Kuwait; United States; United Kingdom; South Korea; Saudi Arabia; France; Canada; Egypt; Syria; Oman; United Arab Emirates; Bahrain; Qatar; Other Allies	Iraq	Victory: South Korean deployment of 3,600 combat troops and engineers; Iraqi withdrawal from Kuwait; Emir Jaber Al-Ahmad Al-Jaber Al-Sabah restored.; Heavy casualties and destruction of Iraqi and Kuwaiti infrastructure.			Roh Tae-woo
War in Afghanistan (South Korean involvement: 2002–2007; 2009–2015)	Northern Alliance (2001); Afghanistan (from 2001); ISAF: United States; United Kingdom; Canada; Australia; New Zealand; Germany; Italy; France; Czech Republic; Netherlands; Turkey; Romania; Georgia; South Korea; Poland; Denmark; Sweden; Norway; Singapore	(Afghanistan) Islamic Emirate (2001) (Afghanistan) Taliban (from 2001) al-Qaeda	(prior to South Korean involvement: 2001: fall of the Islamic Emirate of Afghanistan); 2002: establishment of new Afghan government); 2002: initial South Korean deployment of 210 non-combat (medical and engineering) troops; July 2007 South Korean hostage crisis in Afghanistan: 2 hostages killed by Taliban, 21 hostages released, (Note: The Taliban publicly alleged that the government of South Korea had paid a ransom worth as much as $20 million in order to release the remaining 21 hostages, but this claim has not been confirmed.) South Korean troop withdrawal by end of 2007; late 2009: South Korean redeployment, involving 350 troops protecting Korean PRT of c. 300 aid workers and police officers in Parwan Province; 2014–15: South Korean withdrawal		2	Kim Dae-jung
Iraq War (South Korean involvement: 2004–2008)	Iraq; Iraqi Kurdistan; MNF–I: United States; United Kingdom; South Korea; Italy; Poland; Australia; New Zealand; Georgia; Ukraine; Netherlands; Spain; Romania; Japan; Denmark; Bulgaria	SCJL; Naqshbandi Army ISI: al-Qaeda; FIA; Ansar al-Islam; Islamic Army of Iraq Mahdi Army; Special Groups; Badr Brigades; Kata'ib Hezbollah	2004: initial South Korean troop deployment; 2005: South Korean contribution peaked at 3,600 troops; 2008: South Korean withdrawal; over 20,000 South Korean troops rotated in and out of Iraq from 2004 to 2008; (overall effects: depletion of Iraqi insurgency, improvements in public security; January 2005: Re-establishment of democratic elections; 2011: U.S.–Iraq Status of Forces Agreement)	1		Roh Moo-hyun
Yemeni civil war (South Korean involvement: 2018–)	Republic of Yemen (Presidential Leadership Council); Hirak; Popular Resistance Committee; Al-Islah Movement; Coalition: Saudi Arabia; United Arab Emirates; Sudan (2015–19); Kuwait; South Korea; Qatar (2015–17); Egypt; Jordan; Morocco; Senegal; Academi contractors; Saudi-paid Yemeni mercenaries	Revolutionary Committee/Supreme Political Council: Houthi militants; Yemen Army (pro-Saleh and Houthis) (2015–17); Yemeni Republican Guard (2015–17); Al-Qaeda: AQAP	2018: potential South Korean troop deployment; 2019: provided intel about the Houthis			Moon Jae-in; Yoon Suk Yeol; Lee Jae Myung

== See also ==
- Republic of Korea Armed Forces
- List of wars involving Korea until 1948
- List of wars involving North Korea (since 1948)

== Bibliography ==
- Hoare, J.E. (2020). Historical Dictionary of the Republic of Korea. Historical Dictionaries of Asia, Oceania, and the Middle East. Rowman & Littlefield Publishers. ISBN 978-1-5381-1976-1.
- Ku, Jae H.; Thompson, Drew; Wertz, Daniel (2011). "The U.S.-Republic of Korea Alliance and Afghanistan". Northeast Asia in Afghanistan: Whose Silk Road? (Technical report). pp. 19–24. JSTOR resrep11156.7.
- Shin, David (2019). "A Cautionary Report: Resilience of the U.S.–ROK Alliance During the Pro–North Korea Engagement Era of Progressive rule in South Korea". North Korean Review. 15 (2). McFarland & Company: 59–89. ISSN 1551-2789. JSTOR 26915826.
