= Hambakdo =

Island in Yonan County, North Korea

Coordinates: 37°40′38″N 126°1′42″E

- Hangul: 함박도; 함박섬
- Hanja: 咸朴島; 咸朴섬
- RR: Hambakdo; Hambakseom
- MR: Hambakto; Hambaksŏm

Hambakdo (Korean: 함박도) or Hambaksom is an island in Yonan County, South Hwanghae Province, North Korea.

== Background ==
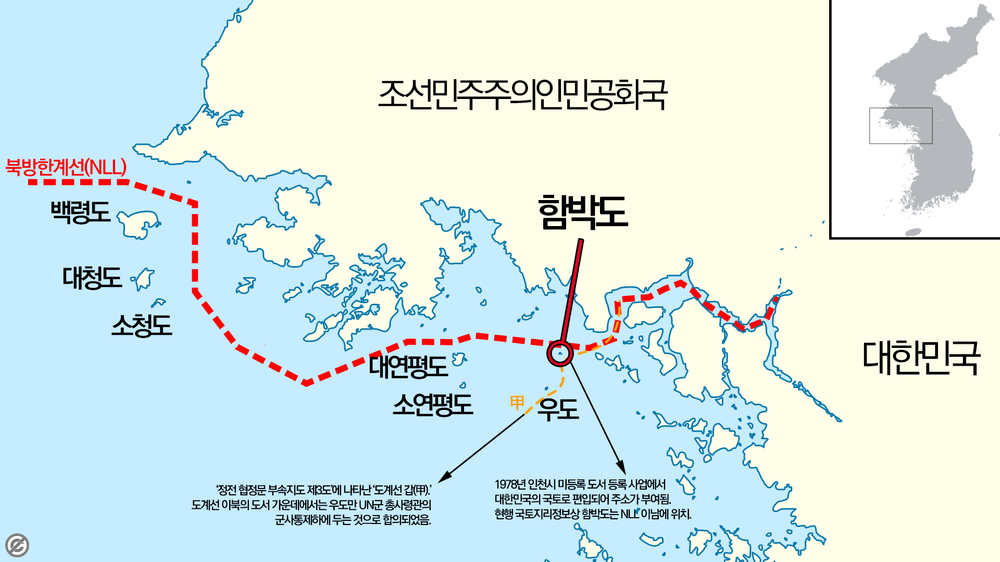
Location of Hambakdo (in red)

The 1953 Armistice Agreement, which was signed by both North Korea and the United Nations Command (UNC), ended the Korean War and specified that all islands in former Hwanghae Province except the five islands including Yeonpyeong Island and Baengnyeong Island would remain under the control of the UNC and South Korea.

However, parties did not agree on a maritime demarcation line, primarily because the UNC wanted to base it on 3 nautical miles (5.6 km) of territorial waters, while North Korea wanted to use 12 nautical miles (22 km). The five islands were Yeonpyeong Island, Baengnyeongdo, Daecheongdo, Socheongdo and U Island. U Island was notably part of Ganghwa County, outside of Hwanghae Province, since 1918.

In 1954, a South Korean shrimp boat was seized by North Korean forces and its crew repatriated, while in 1965, another incident occurred where North Korean forces attacked and detained South Korean fishermen fishing clams on the island, sinking one boat and damaging two others. After an escalation of North Korean presence in 1973, no civilian encounters have occurred on the island.

South Korea claims that Hambakdo is a part of Ganghwa County, registering Hambakdo to the Tract index in 1978. Hambakdo was uninhabited until 2017. In 2019, Kookje Daily News reported that there are North Korean military buildings in Hambakdo, causing debates in South Korea. On September 5, 2019, Chosun Ilbo reported that the island has a radar with range of 30 to 60 kilometers. Meanwhile, the South Korean government confirmed on September 18 that no offensive weapons were on the island. The Korean Board of Audit and Inspection subsequently confirmed claims made by South Korean government that Hambakdo is north of the Northern Limit Line.

== Links ==
- Video of Hambakdo Island
