= List of wars involving Korea until 1948 =

This is a list of wars involving Korea until 1948, when the Korean peninsula was de facto divided into South Korea (Republic of Korea, ROK) and North Korea (Democratic People's Republic of Korea, DPRK).

- For wars involving South Korea since 1948, see List of wars involving South Korea
- For wars involving North Korea since 1948, see List of wars involving North Korea

== Gojoseon: ? - 108BC ==
Conflict	Gojoseon	Opponents	Results	Monarch of Gojoseon
Gojoseon-Yan War (c.300 BC)	Gojoseon	Yan	Defeat: Gojoseon loses its core territory in Liaodong and is forced to retreat to Pyongyang.	Unknown
Wiman's political change (c.194 BC)	Gojoseon	Wiman	Defeat: Jun defeats and Wiman becomes the monarch of Gojoseon.	Jun
Gojoseon-Han War (109-108 BC)	Gojoseon	Han dynasty	Defeat: Gojoseon is annexed by the Han dynasty, which installs the Four Commanderies of Han in its former lands.	King Ugeo

== Three Kingdoms of Korea ==
=== Goguryeo: 37 BC – 668 AD ===
Conflict	Goguryeo and its allies	Opponents	Results	Monarch of Goguryeo	Notable battles
Goguryeo–Wei War (244-245)	Goguryeo	Cao Wei	Defeat: Goguryeo temporarily loses its capital and is nearly destroyed.	King Dongcheon	
Goguryeo–Wa War (391-404)	Goguryeo; Silla	Baekje; Wa; Gaya	Victory: The power of Geumgwan Gaya is broken and Wa is expelled from Korean affairs. Silla becomes a protectorate of Goguryeo.	Gwanggaeto the Great	
Goguryeo–Sui War (598, 612–614)	Goguryeo	Sui dynasty	Victory: One of the major causes of the fall of the Sui Dynasty	King Yeongyang	Battle of Salsu (612)
Goguryeo–Tang War (645–668 CE)	Goguryeo; Baekje; Yamato; Mohe	Tang dynasty Silla	Defeat: Fall of Goguryeo; Annexation of Goguryeo by Tang; End of the Three Kingdoms of Korea; Establishment of Andong Protectorate; Goguryeo and Baekje swear fealty to Silla, thereby forming Unified Silla; Beginning of territorial disputes between Silla and Tang	King Bojang	Battle of Sasu (662); Battle of Baekgang (663); Battle of Hwangsanbeol (660)

=== Baekje: 18 BC – 660 AD ===
Conflict	Baekje and its allies	Opponents	Results	Monarch of Baekje
Baekje–Tang War (660-663)	Tang dynasty Silla	Baekje; Yamato	Defeat: Fall of Baekje; Annexation of Baekje by Tang; Establishment of Ungjin Commandery; Beginning of territorial disputes between Silla and Tang	King Uija

=== Silla: 57 BC – 935 AD ===
Conflict	Silla and its allies	Opponents	Results	Monarch of Silla
Silla–Gaya War (88–562)	Silla	Gaya; Baekje	Victory: Gaya was absorbed into Silla and Baekje.	Various
Silla–Tang War (668–676)	Silla; Goguryeo (vassal of Silla); Baekje (vassal of Silla)	Tang dynasty	Victory: Silla recaptured the territory south of Taedong River, while Tang held control over former Gorguryeo territory north of Taedong River.	King Munmu

== Goryeo: 918–1392 ==
Conflict	Goryeo and its allies	Opponents	Results	Monarch of Goryeo	Notable battles
Goryeo–Khitan War (993, 1010, 1018–1019)	Goryeo	Liao dynasty	Victory: The Khitan Liao dynasty cedes territory around the Yalu River basin to Goryeo; Goryeo pays tribute to the Liao dynasty to establish diplomatic relations; Peace ensues between Goryeo and Liao, and Liao never attacks Goryeo again	King Hyeonjong	
Korean–Jurchen border conflicts (10th century – 14th century)	Goryeo	Jin dynasty Jurchens	Stalemate	Various	
Mongol invasions of Korea (1231, 1232, 1235–1239, 1251, 1254, 1255, 1257)	Goryeo	Mongol Empire	Defeat: Goryeo capitulates in 1259 and becomes a vassal between 1270 and 1356.	King Gojong	Siege of Kuju – 1231 – 1232
Mongol invasions of Japan (1274, 1281)	Mongol Empire Yuan dynasty Goryeo (vassal of Mongol Empire)	Imperial Court: Kamakura shogunate; Hōjō clan; Sō clan; Shōni clan; Sashi clan; Taira clan; Kikuchi clan; Ōtomo clan; Shimazu clan; Matsura clan	Defeat	King Wonjong; King Chungnyeol	
Red Turban invasions of Korea (1359, 1361)	Goryeo	Red Turbans	Victory: Although Goryeo had repulsed the Red Turbans, both the population and the economy had been severely damaged.	King Gongmin	

== Joseon: 1392–1897 ==
Conflict	Joseon dynasty and its allies	Opponents	Results	Monarch of Joseon	Notable battles
Second Tsushima Expedition (1396)	Joseon Dynasty	Tsushima Province	Victory: Resulted in yearly tributes by Tsushima.	King Taejong	
Third Tsushima Expedition (1419)	Joseon Dynasty	Tsushima Province	Victory: Sadamori sends a letter of surrender to Joseon court; Wokuo pirates cease their activities in Joseon	King Sejong the Great	
Joseon Northern Expedition (1443)	Joseon Dynasty	Jianzhou Jurchens	Victory: Led to establishment of present-day northern borders.	King Sejong the Great	
Sampo Invasion (1510)	Joseon Dynasty	Tsushima Province: Japanese pirates	Victory: Joseon broke all diplomatic relations with Japan after the incident.	King Jungjong	
Japanese invasions of Korea, or Imjin War (1592–1598)	Joseon Dynasty: Righteous Army; Ming dynasty	Azuchi-Momoyama Japan	Victory: October 1598: Japanese withdrawal from Korea; Joseon and Ming victory	King Seonjo	Siege of Pyongyang (1592); Battle of Pyongyang (1592); Battle of Yonan – 1592; Battle of Bukgwan – 1592; Siege of Pyongyang (1593)
Ming-Manchu War (1618–1683)	Ming dynasty Joseon Dynasty; Kumul Khanate; Turfan Khanate	Manchus	Defeat: Joseon helped the Ming dynasty in the Battle of Sarhu.	Gwanghaegun	
First Manchu invasion of Korea (1627)	Joseon Dynasty	Later Jin Dynasty	Defeat: Was spurred by actions of Mao Wenlong, a Ming commander who operated off islands of Korea.	King Injo	
Second Manchu invasion of Korea (1636–1637)	Joseon Dynasty	Qing Dynasty	Defeat: Brought forth the idea of Punitive North Expedition in Joseon.	King Injo	
Sino-Russian border conflicts (1652–1689; Korean involvement since 1654)	China; Joseon Dynasty	Russia; Cossacks	Victory: Part of Russia's expansion into Siberia.	King Hyojong	
Yi In-jwa's Rebellion, or Musin Rebellion (1728)	Joseon Army	Yi In-Jwa's rebel army	Government victory: Rebellion suppressed	King Yeongjo	
Hong Gyeong-rae's Rebellion (1812)	Joseon Army	Hong Gyeong-rae's rebel army	Government victory: Rebellion suppressed	King Sunjo	
French expedition to Korea (1866)	Joseon Dynasty	France	Victory: Spurred by Joseon's execution of French Catholic priests on the same year.	Heungseon Daewongun	
United States expedition to Korea (1871)	Joseon Dynasty	United States	Victory: Spurred by Joseon's unknown treatment of the American merchant ship General Sherman.	Heungseon Daewongun	
Ganghwa Island incident (1875)	Joseon Dynasty	Japan	Defeat: Joseon was forced to sign Treaty of Ganghwa in 1876.	King Gojong	
Imo Incident (1882)	Joseon Dynasty	Korean military dissidents, mostly from the Central Defense Command	Government victory: Spurred by Central Defense Command receiving significantly worse treatment compared to the newly established "Byolkigun".	King Gojong	
Gapsin Coup (1884)	Joseon Dynasty; Supported by Qing China	Reformist Faction; Supported by Japan	Government victory: Qing Chinese military intervention; Flight of the Progressives to Japan	King Gojong	
Donghak Peasant Revolution (1894–1895)	Joseon Dynasty Supported by: Qing China (May–July 1894); Japan (July 1894 – 1895); Enlightenment Party (July 1894 – 1895)	Donghak Peasant's Army Co-belligerent: Qing China (July 1894 – April 1895)	Rebellion suppressed; pro-Japanese takeover: Initial Qing Chinese intervention supporting king Gojong; July 1894: Japanese intervention overthrew the pro-Chinese Korean regime and installed a pro-Japanese Korean regime; Gabo Reform began; July 1894 – April 1895: Japan won the First Sino-Japanese War and expelled Qing China from Korea; late 1894–1895: Japanese–Korean forces suppressed last Donghak rebels	King Gojong Heungseon Daewongun (pro-Japanese puppet, July–September 1894)	Japanese occupation of Gyeongbokgung; Battle of Ugeumchi; Retreat from Gongju

== Korean Empire: 1897–1910 ==
Conflict	Korean Empire and its allies	Opponents	Results	Emperor of Korea
Korean Invasion of Manchuria (1902)	Korea	China	Victory: Korean settlers and soldiers moved into Southern Manchuria as the Qing Dynasty weakened	Emperor Gwangmu
Eulsa Righteous War (1905)	Korea: Righteous Army	Japan	Defeat: Reaction to Eulsa Protective Treaty, which made the Korean Empire a Protectorate of Japan.	Emperor Gwangmu
Jeungmi Righteous War (1907)	Korea: Righteous Army	Japan	Defeat: Reaction to the forced dissolution of the Korean Imperial Army.	Emperor Yunghui
Great Korean Militia Roundup Campaign (1909)	Korea: Righteous Army	Japan	Defeat: Most battles were around the Southern Korea region of Jeolla.	Emperor Yunghui

== Occupied Korea: 1910–1945 ==
Conflict	Provisional Government of Korea and its allies	Opponents	Results	Leader of Provisional Government
Battle of Fengwudong (1920)	Provisional Korea: Korean Independence Army	Japan: Imperial Japanese Army	Victory: One of earlier Korean independence movements.	President; Syngman Rhee
Battle of Chongsanli (1920)	Provisional Korea: Korean Independence Army	Japan: Imperial Japanese Army	Victory: Referred in Korea as "Great victory of Chongsanli".	President; Syngman Rhee
Free City Incident (1921)	Provisional Korea: Korea Independence Corps	Far Eastern Republic	Defeat: Most of initial Korean militia was destroyed during the massacre.	President; Syngman Rhee
South-East Asian theatre of World War II (1942–1945)	United Kingdom: India; Malaya; Hong Kong; Burma; Ceylon; China: (Provisional Government of the Republic of Korea) Korean Liberation Army; United States	Japan: State of Burma; Azad Hind; Thailand	Victory: The KLA fought in the Burma Campaign.	Premier; Kim Gu

== See also ==
- List of wars involving North Korea (since 1948)
- List of wars involving South Korea (since 1948)
- Republic of Korea Armed Forces – military of South Korea
- Korean People's Army – military of North Korea

== Bibliography ==
- Hoare, J.E. (2020). Historical Dictionary of the Republic of Korea. Historical Dictionaries of Asia, Oceania, and the Middle East. Rowman & Littlefield Publishers. ISBN 978-1-5381-1976-1.
