= Yeonbaek County =

1914–1952 county in Korea

- Hangul: 연백군
- Hanja: 延白郡
- RR: Yeonbaek-gun
- MR: Yŏnbaek-kun

Yeonbaek County (Yeonbaek-gun) or Yonbaek County (Yonbaek-gun) was a county in Hwanghae Province, Korea. It was established in 1914 by uniting Yonan County and Paechon County. It was divided during the Division of Korea. The part of Yeonbaek county under South Korean authorities were administered under Gyeonggi Province. During the Korean War, North Korea took all of Yeonbaek County, and after briefly establishing the regions formerly under South Korean control as South Yeonbaek county (남연백군), North Korea disestablished Yeonbaek County and reestablished former Yonan County and Paechon County in 1952.

== Administrative division ==
The county had 1 Eup, 19 Myeons and 175 Ris.

=== Yonan Eup ===
The region was famous for its wine.

=== Gwaegungmyeon ===
The region was famous for its silk.

=== Geumsanmyeon ===
The region was famous for its beans and pots.

=== Dochonmyeon ===
The region had an old fortress.

=== Mokdanmyeon ===
The region harvested weed, ginseng and tobacco.

=== Bongbukmyeon ===
The region had a gold mine.

=== Bongseomyeon ===
The region was where the cranes live.

=== Seoksanmyeon ===
The region had a lot of fields and was famous for its rice.

=== Songbongmyeon ===
Temple called ungyesa existed here.

=== Onjeongmyeon ===
Ginseng and cotton were its specialties.

=== Yongdomyeon ===
The region had tons of fertile fields.

=== Unsanmyeon ===
A rock that is said to be where Gongmin of Goryeo was born existed here.

=== Yugokmyeon ===
The region had some cattle.

=== Unchonmyeon ===
The region was famous for god quality crops such as beans. Also, it had a onsen.

=== Haeryongmyeon ===
The region was known for its scenery.

=== Haesongmyeon ===
The region was known for its fishing event in April.

=== Haewolmyeon ===
The region was one of the top 4 regions that produced gold out of all the regions in Korea.

=== Honammyeon ===
The region had some dolmen ruins.

=== Hodongmyeon ===
Ancient pottery was discovered here.

=== Hwaseongmyeon ===
There was a temple that is said to be founded by Gongmin of Goryeo, which later disappeared.

== Education ==
In 1929, due to the 1 myeon 1 school policy, every up and myon had its own elementary schools. In 1934, the yonan agricultural school was established. As of 1938, the county had 64 Seodangs.

== Religion ==
As of 1939, there were 50 Buddhist temples, 19 Roman Catholic cathedrals and 19 Protestant churches.

== Population census ==
In 1942, there were 35,953 families and 199,942 people living in the county which was the most populous county in the province.
