= Yi Yangwŏn =

Korean scholar-official (1526–1592)

Great Lord of Hansan Yi Yangwŏn

Chief State Councillor
- In office 5th month of 1592 – 5th month of 1592
- Preceded by: Yi Sanhae
- Succeeded by: Yu Sŏngnyong

Right State Councillor
- In office 1st month of 1591 – 5th month of 1592
- Preceded by: Yu Sŏngnyong
- Succeeded by: Yun Tusu

Personal details
- Born: 19th day, 9th month of 1526
- Died: 26th day, 7th month of 1592 Icheon, Joseon
- Cause of death: Fasting
- Resting place: Dangjin, South Korea
- Awards: 3rd Kwangguk Merit Subject
- Clan: Jeonju Yi

Military service
- Allegiance: Joseon
- Battles/wars: Imjin War; Battle of Haeyuryŏng; Battle of Imjin River

Korean name
- Hangul: 이양원
- Hanja: 李陽元
- RR: I Yangwon
- MR: I Yangwŏn

Art name
- Hangul: 노저
- Hanja: 鷺渚
- RR: Nojeo
- MR: Nojŏ

Courtesy name
- Hangul: 백춘
- Hanja: 伯春
- RR: Baekchun
- MR: Paekch'un

Posthumous name
- Hangul: 문헌
- Hanja: 文憲
- RR: Munheon
- MR: Munhŏn

Yi Yangwŏn (Korean: 이양원; Hanja: 李陽元; 19th day, 9th month of 1526 – 26th day, 7th month of 1592) was a Korean scholar-official and military leader of the mid-Joseon period. Born into a collateral branch of the royal Jeonju Yi clan, he studied under Yi Chungho, entered the Royal Confucian Academy at fifteen, and passed state civil service examination and entered government service in 1556.

Yi began government service in 1557 as Proofreader in the Office of Special Advisors and later held central posts, gaining the sagadoksŏ privilege at the Reading Hall. In 1563 he went to Ming China as Document Official to correct the royal genealogy, securing a promise to amend the Collected Statutes of the Ming Dynasty and earning promotion, rewards, and later recognition as a Third-rank Kwangguk Merit Subject and Great Lord of Hansan.

Under King Seonjo, Yi helped manage the king's accession as Chief Royal Secretary, then served as provincial commander in Gyeongsang, became a disciple of Yi Hwang, and later returned to hold senior posts including Inspector General and Right State Councillor.

With the outbreak of the Imjin War in 1592, Yi was charged with defending the capital but failed to prevent the fall of Hansŏng. He helped win the Battle of Haeyuryŏng yet was later defeated along the Imjin River. After joining Prince Gwanghae's court at Icheon, he died there after refusing food on believing a false report that King Seonjo had crossed into Liaodong.

== Early life ==
=== Birth and education ===
Yi Yangwŏn was born on the 19th day, 9th lunar month of 1526. He belonged to a collateral branch of the royal Jeonju Yi clan as the great-grandson of Prince Sŏnsŏng, a son of King Jeongjong. His father was Yi Hakchŏng (이학정; 李鶴丁), who, as Prince Iwŏn (이원군; 利原君), held the nominal office of Buryŏng (부령; 副令) in the Office of the Royal Clan (종친부; 宗親府). His mother was a daughter of Chŏng Yŏk (정역; 鄭㻛)—also recorded as Chŏng Ch'ang (정창; 鄭瑒 (Note: 이인화 2020, p. 155.))—of the Dongnae Chŏng clan.

Although he lost his mother at an early age, Yi Yangwŏn devoted himself to study and became a disciple of Yi Chungho (이중호; 李仲虎). At the age of fifteen he entered the Royal Confucian Academy, where he gained a reputation for his prose and poetry, and in 1555 he passed both the Classics Licentiate Examination (생원시; 生員試) and Literary Licentiate Examination (진사시; 進士試). In the following year, he passed the literary section of the special state examination held in the royal presence (알성시; 謁聖試) with third-tier honors (병과; 丙科), thereby beginning his official career.

=== Early career ===
In 1557, Yi Yangwŏn began his official career as a Proofreader (정자; 正字) of the Office of Special Advisors. He subsequently served as an Editorial Examiner (검열; 檢閱) at the Office of Royal Decrees (예문관; 藝文館) and as a First Copist (저작; 著作) of the Office of Special Advisors. Advancing through several posts, he was promoted in 1559 to Erudite (박사; 博士) and Deputy Compiler (부수찬; 副修撰) of the Office of Special Advisors.

The following year, he was selected for the royal privilege of sagadoksŏ (사가독서; 賜暇讀書), a system by which outstanding scholars were granted leave from official duties to devote themselves to study, and thereby entered the Reading Hall (독서당; 讀書堂) to further his learning.

He returned to office the next year as Fourth Tutor (사서; 司書) of the Tutorial Office for the Crown Prince (세자시강원; 世子侍講院) and subsequently held the posts of Assistant Section Chief (좌랑; 佐郎) of the Ministry of War (병조; 兵曹), Sixth Counselor (수찬; 修撰) of the Office of Special Advisors, and Senior Section Chief (정랑; 正郎) of the Ministry of Personnel (이조; 吏曹). In 1562, he was appointed Regulation Transcriber (검상; 檢詳) of the State Council.

=== Diplomatic mission to Ming China ===
In 1563, Yi was dispatched as Document Official (서장관; 書狀官) on a diplomatic mission to Ming China, where he was charged with settling the protracted dispute concerning the Joseon royal lineage known as the Chonggye Pyŏnmu. The purpose of this delegation was to amend an erroneous statement in the Collected Statutes of the Ming Dynasty, which had alleged that King Taejo, the founder of Joseon, descended from Yi Inim—a late-Goryeo nobleman condemned as a traitor.

On the 2nd day, 5th lunar month of 1563, Yi Yangwŏn departed for Ming China, accompanying the Chief Envoy (주청사; 奏請使), Kim Chu (김주; 金澍). Together with Kim, Yi succeeded in obtaining from the Ming emperor a promise to correct the imperial records regarding King Taejo, by which the emperor agreed to acknowledge Yi Chach'un as the father of him, thereby rectifying the earlier derogatory account of the royal founder.

However, during the mission Kim Chu died, and Yi Yangwŏn returned to Joseon bearing the imperial edict himself. On the journey home, while crossing the Daling River, the imperial edict was seized by Mongols. Fortunately, a copy made by Hong Chŏng (홍정; 洪貞) survived, allowing Yi to report its contents successfully to the court.

In recognition of his service, Yi Yangwŏn was promoted to the senior third-rank title of Grand Master for Comprehensive Governance (통정대부; 通政大夫), attaining the offices of Third Minister (참의; 參議) of Personnel and Assistant Deputy Director (부제학; 副提學) at the Office of Special Advisors. He was also granted land and slaves in recognition of his merit. The Office of the Censor-General and the Office of the Inspector-General, however, submitted memorials opposing what they deemed an excessive reward, but King Myeongjong refused to accept their remonstrance.

After King Seonjo's accession, when the matter of the royal genealogy correction was finally concluded, in the 8th lunar month of 1590, Yi Yangwŏn was invested as a Third-rank Kwangguk Merit Subject and ennobled as Great Lord of Hansan.

== Career during Seonjo reign ==
=== Accession of King Seonjo ===
In 1563, Yi Yangwŏn successively held the posts of Senior Section Chief of the Ministry of Personnel, Sixth Royal Secretary (동부승지; 同副承旨) of the Royal Secretariat, and then as Right Assistant Royal Secretary (우부승지; 右副承旨). In 1564, he was promoted to Right Royal Secretary (우승지; 右承旨) and later became Third Minister of Rites. In the following year, 1565, he was appointed Chief Censor (대사간; 大司諫) of the Office of the Censor-General, holding a succession of key administrative posts before being appointed Chief Royal Secretary (도승지; 都承旨) in 1567.

On the 27th day, 6th lunar month of 1567, when King Myeongjong suddenly fell gravely ill, Yi Yangwŏn attended at his bedside in his capacity as Chief Royal Secretary and superintendent (제조; 提調) of Palace Pharmacy. When the king died the next day, the 28th day of the 6th lunar month of 1567, without an heir, Queen Insun issued an order designating Prince Hasŏng, son of Grand Prince Tŏkhŭng, as successor to the throne.

Under orders from Chief State Councillor Yi Jun'gyŏng, Yi Yangwŏn, accompanied by Pak Sorip (박소립; 朴素立), Hwang Taesu (황대수; 黃大受), and Yi Chŏngho (이정호; 李廷虎), proceeded to Prince Hasŏng's residence to escort him to the palace. When officials of the Ministry of War and the State Tribunal failed to prevent unauthorized persons from entering the premises, Yi ordered Yi Wŏnu (이원우; 李元祐), Chief of the Capital Police Bureau, to surround the residence and prohibit entry. At dawn, Prince Hasŏng's maternal uncle, Chŏng Ch'angsŏ, opened the gate and admitted Yi and his companions. Through Chŏng, the prince expressed his intent to decline the throne, citing the period of royal mourning, but Yi urged him not to refuse, explaining that the succession had already been decided. After Prince Hasŏng emerged, Yi Yangwŏn and the court diarists confirmed his identity and escorted him to the palace.

Subsequently, certain individuals falsely claimed to have rendered service during King Seonjo's enthronement, submitting lists of supposed contributors under the pretense of the prince's orders. Pak Sorip delivered these lists to the State Council, where Yi Jun'gyŏng ordered all of them burned. Yi Yangwŏn was then dismissed from office for failing to prevent this misconduct.

=== Provincial service and association with Yi Hwang ===
In the 8th lunar month of 1567, Yi Yangwŏn voluntarily requested an outside appointment and was assigned as Magistrate of Andong. In the autumn of the following year, he was appointed Provincial Military Commander (병마절도사; 兵馬節度使) of Left Gyeongsang (경상좌도; 慶尙左道), and in 1568 he rose to the position of Provincial Governor (관찰사; 觀察使) of Gyeongsang Province.

During this period, Yi sought to become a disciple of Yi Hwang and visited him personally, composing three regulated poems in seven-character lines titled "Presented to Master Yi of Tosan" (정도산이선생; 呈陶山李先生 (Note: 조지형 2022, p. 362.)). In response, Yi Hwang sent three poems of the same form, thereby formally accepting Yi Yangwŏn as his student. As a disciple of Yi Hwang, Yi Yangwŏn maintained close relations with several other members of Yi Hwang's scholarly circle, including Chŏng Ku, Hwang Chullyang (황준량; 黃俊良), and Kwŏn Homun (권호문; 權好文). In 1570, he resigned from office due to illness.

=== Return to central government and later career ===
In the 10th lunar month of 1570, Yi Yangwŏn returned to central government service as Vice Minister (참판; 參判) of Justice. In the 11th lunar month of the same year, he was dispatched to Ming China as envoy on the Winter Solstice mission (동지사; 冬至使) to extend seasonal felicitations to the Ming court, and again in 1572 he served as Chief Envoy, undertaking another diplomatic journey to the Ming court. Over the course of his career in 1570s, he held numerous senior positions, including four terms as Inspector General (대사헌; 大司憲), several vice-ministerial posts, the office of Second Deputy Director (동지사; 同知事) of the Privy Council (중추부; 中樞府), and Assistant Deputy Director at the Office of Special Advisors.

In 1581, he was appointed Minister (판서; 判書) of Justice, and in 1583 once again served as Inspector General. In 1586, he was promoted to Minister of Personnel. He later served successively as Second Deputy Director of the Office of the Royal Lectures (경연청; 經筵廳), Minister of War, Minister of Personnel, Director (대제학; 大提學) of the Office of Special Advisors, and Director of the Office of Royal Decrees. On the 29th day, 5th lunar month of 1590, Yi was appointed Right Associate State Councilor (우찬성; 右贊成), and in the 9th lunar month of the same year, Left Associate State Councilor (좌찬성; 左贊成). In the 1st lunar month of 1591, he was promoted to Right State Councilor.

== Imjin War ==
=== Outbreak of the Imjin War ===
On the 14th day, 4th lunar month of 1592, the Imjin War broke out and Japanese troops landed at Busan. The court was informed of the invasion on the 17th day, 4th lunar month, through a military dispatch from Pak Hong. After this report, Yi Il and Sin Rip were sent to the front, and Yi Yangwŏn was appointed Prosecuting Commissioner (검찰사; 檢察使 (Note: 이인화 2020, p. 170.)) of the Capital.

When news reached the court on the 29th day, 4th lunar month, that Sin Rip had been defeated, Byŏn Ŏnsu (변언수; 邊彦琇 (Note: 이인화 2016, p. 528.)) was first appointed Commander of the Capital Defense Forces (유도대장; 留都大將), but he was soon replaced by Yi Yangwŏn, who was concurrently made Commander of the Fortress Defense (수성대장; 守城大將) and Commander of the Capital Defense Forces, charged with organizing the defense of the capital. Under him, Yi Chŏn (이전; 李戩 (Note: 박현규 2022, p. 331.)) and Byŏn Ŏnsu were assigned as Left and Right Division Commanders, while Pak Ch'unggan (박충간; 朴忠侃) served as Circuit Military Inspector of the Capital (경성순검사; 京城巡檢使). However, their forces were few in number and poorly trained.

Yi Yangwŏn himself was unable to make sufficient preparations for the sudden task of defending the capital. When the armies of Kim Myŏngwŏn and Sin Kak, who had been defending the Han River, began to retreat, Yi likewise decided to withdraw his forces.

=== Battle of Haeyuryŏng ===
Yi Yangwŏn retreated with Sin Kak to Yangju, where they reorganized their troops. There they were joined by the forces of Yi Hon, the Provincial Military Commander of South Hamgyong, who had marched south to reinforce the capital's defenses, and together they established a combined camp. Yi Yangwŏn, Sin Kak, and Yi Hon received intelligence that Japanese troops occupying Hansŏng were committing acts of plunder in the surrounding regions. The three commanders then took up positions in ambush at Haeyuryŏng (해유령; 蟹踰嶺), a mountain pass on the road between Yangju and Paju, and on the 16th day, 5th lunar month of 1592 they successfully attacked and routed the Japanese forces by making effective use of the terrain.

Following the victory, Yi Yangwŏn sent Yi Chak (이작; 李綽 (Note: 이인화 2020, p. 172.)) to the royal temporary headquarters to report the victory. In recognition of this success, the court appointed him Chief State Councillor, though he was soon thereafter dismissed from the post.

=== Battle of Imjin River ===
After the victory at Haeyuryŏng, Yi Yangwŏn and Sin Kak joined Yi Il in reinforcing the defensive position at Taet'an (대탄; 大灘) on the upper reaches of the Imjin River. The Imjin River defense line consisted of the following main contingents: the forces of Kim Myŏngwŏn and Han Ŭngin stationed at Imjin (임진; 臨津), and the combined troops of Yi Yangwŏn, Sin Kak, Yi Il, and Yi Siŏn positioned at Taet'an.

On the night of the 17th day, 5th lunar month of 1592, the troops at Imjin launched a general assault across the river, but were deceived by the Japanese army's feigned retreat and suffered a heavy defeat. The victorious Second Division under Katō Kiyomasa, lacking the means to cross the river at that point, moved upstream toward Taet'an. Upon the arrival of the Japanese forces, Yi Yangwŏn's troops dispersed without mounting resistance, and Yi himself fled toward Kangwŏn Province.

Subsequently, Yi conducted military operations in Ch'ŏllyŏng and Hoeyang before joining the provisional court of Prince Gwanghae at Icheon, where he was appointed Provincial Prosecuting Commissioner of Hamgyŏng.

=== Death ===
At that time, a rumor later proven false that King Seonjo had crossed into Liaodong spread. Stricken with grief, Yi lamented the report and refused to take food. After fasting for eight days, he died on the 26th day, 7th lunar month of 1592, at the age of sixty-seven.

== Works ==
=== Song of Red and Green ===
During the period when Yi Yangwŏn held high office, the court was deeply troubled by factional strife, as the political sphere had become divided between the Easterners and Westerners. Although Yi Yangwŏn had studied under Yi Hwang, he did not align himself with the Easterners. Instead, he cultivated close friendships with leading figures of the Westerners such as Chŏng Ch'ŏl, maintaining a stance independent of party affiliation. On one occasion, King Seonjo invited Yi to share a drink and composed the poem "Song of the Crow and the Heron" (아로가; 鴉鷺歌 (Note: 조지형 2022, p. 358.)) to inquire into Yi's true intentions regarding his nonpartisan conduct. He wrote:

鴉鷺歌

鴉兮莫黑 鷺兮莫白
黑白之紛如兮
鵰獨胡爲乎不黑不白

—King Seonjo
Translation:
Song of the Crow and the Heron

The crow is not all black, nor is the heron all white.
Black and white are already in such confusion,
so how is it that you alone, like the eagle,
are neither black nor white?

In response, Yi composed "Song of Red and Green" (주록가; 朱綠歌), a poem that the Korean literature scholar Cho Ji-hyoung has interpreted as presenting him as standing above factional politics and loyal solely to the sovereign:

朱綠歌

謂朱非我兮 謂綠非我
朱綠之眩晃兮 又非我之娜也
君胡爲兮不我知 謂我兮染夏

—Yi Yangwŏn
Translation:
Song of Red and Green

Call me red, yet I am not; call me green, yet I am not.
The dazzling show of red and green is no true beauty of mine.
My lord, why is it that, not knowing me, you say that I have been dyed?

=== Song of the Lofty Tree ===
Yi Yangwŏn's poem "Song of the Lofty Tree" (고수가; 高樹歌) is said to have been composed during a period when he maintained political neutrality and both factions sought to win his allegiance. According to Cho Ji-hyoung, the poem implores restraint in factional conflict and expresses Yi's inner sentiments of loyalty and devotion to the sovereign.

高樹歌

넙고 넙흔 남게 날 권해 올으라고
이보 벗님네야 흔드지 마르소서
나려져 죽기난 슯지 안흐나 임 못 볼가 하노라

—Yi Yangwŏn
Translation:
Song of the Lofty Tree

I'm up in this lofty tree because you put me there
Look here, my friends, stop shaking the trunk.
If I fall and die, that's no great sadness;
my fear is I won't be able to see my lord.

—Kevin O'Rourke (2002)
