= Aho-dong =

Village in North Korea

Coordinates: 37°54′N 126°22′E

- Hangul: 아호동
- Hanja: 鵝湖洞
- RR: Aho-dong
- MR: Aho-dong

Aho-dong is a dong in Munsal-li, Paechon, South Hwanghae Province, North Korea, located at coordinates 37.8942 N, 126.3742 E. The city is immediately north of the South Korean-North Korean border, which is 7 kilometres (4.3 mi) from the city center. Its approximate population is 23,553. The dong's altitude is 2 metres (6.6 ft). Nearby cities and towns include Chiroe-dong. The dong is also called ajeochidong and is named as such after a swamp that was full of geese.
