= Namsan (Haeju) =

Hill in Haeju, North Korea

Namsan (남산, "South Mountain") is a 122-metre high hill in Haeju-si, South Hwanghae Province, North Korea.
