= Yonan County =

Yŏnan County 연안군
- County

Korean transcription(s)
  - Hanja: 延安郡
  - McCune-Reischauer: Yŏnan-gun
  - Revised Romanization: Yeonan-gun
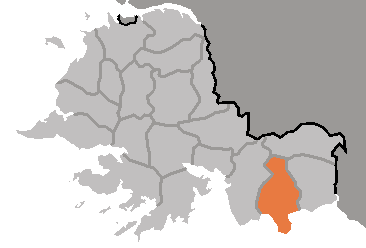
- Country: North Korea
- Province: South Hwanghae Province

Area
  - Total: 524.4 km^{2} (202.5 sq mi)

Population (2008)
  - Total: 158,845
  - Density: 302.9/km^{2} (784.5/sq mi)

Yŏnan County is a county in South Hwanghae Province, North Korea.

== History ==
Yonan County was formed from regions traditionally associated with the name Yonan, a region during the Joseon era where it was adjacent to Paechon in the east, Pyongsan in the west and north, and Hwanghae in the south. The region was called various names in the kingdom of Goguryeo, and the names were Dongsamhol (冬音忽), Dongeumhol (冬三忽) and Siyeomseong(豉鹽城). During the kingdom of Silla, the region formed the subdivision of Haego County (海皐郡, haegogun). The region was called Yeomju (鹽州) in the Early Goryeo era but was later incorporated into Haeju during the reign of Seongjong of Goryeo. Other names later during the Goryeo era included Yeongeung prefecture (永膺縣),·Bokju (復州),·Seokju (碩州), and Onjumok (溫州牧).In 1310, Onjumok was degraded to a lower subdivision called a bu called Yonanbu (溫州府).In 1413 it became a Yonan dohobu and became part of Hwanghae Province instead of Gyeonggi Province. It officially became Yonan County in 1895, but due to a subdivision merger, it formed part of Yeonbaek County along with Paechon County. After the liberation of Korea, the region was briefly under the occupation zone of the Americans in the South of the Korean peninsula, then forming Yeonbaek County under Gyeonggi province. After the Korean War in 1953, the region was under the effective control of the North Korean government, and in 1954 was placed under the South Hwanghae Province.

== Administrative divisions ==
Yŏnan county is divided into 1 ŭp (town), 1 rodongjagu (workers' district) and 27 ri (villages):

=== Yŏnan-ŭp ===
Yŏnan-ŭp (延安邑,연안읍) is an up that is on the East side of the county. The up was formed in 1952 and is the administrative centre of the county. The up hosts several factories of food, fabric, and pottery, and collective farms. The up hosts the Yonan castle, which is National treasure No 85 of the DPRK.

=== Yŏmjŏl-lodongjagu ===
Yŏmjŏl-lodongjagu (염전로동자구,鹽田勞動者區) is a worker's district located on the southern coast of the county, which was named as such for its Salt evaporation ponds. The region specializes in salt producing. The region was part of South Korea before the Korean war, so South Korean salt production suffered when it later became part of North Korea.

=== Ahyŏl-li ===
Ahyŏl-li (아현리,雅峴里) is formed from merging part of Uihyolli and Takyongri and its name added the a(雅) meaning beautiful. The region is mountainous and is part of the Suyang mountain range.

=== Changgong-ri ===
Changgong-ri (장곡리,長谷里) was formed in 1914 as a ri in Yeonbaek County. It was named changgok for its long valleys.

=== Chayang-ri ===
Chayang-ri (자양리,紫陽里) was named as such for its red soil and land where the sun shines.

=== Chŏngch'ol-li ===
Chŏngch'ol-li (정촌리,鼎村里) was named as such for its Ding production.

=== Songho-ri ===
Songho-ri (송호리,松湖里) was named as such after Songyari and Honamri.

=== Ch'angdŏng-ri ===
Ch'angdŏng-ri (창덕리,氅德里) is named as such because of a story that Seonbis have showcased their De(德) while wearing a Changyi(氅衣).

=== Ch'ŏnghwa-ri ===
Ch'ŏnghwa-ri (청화리,淸華里) was named after Chonggyeri and Chonghwadong.

=== Ch'ŏnt'ae-ri ===
Ch'ŏnt'ae-ri (천태리,天台里) was named after the term Chontae, meaning high mountains.

=== Haenam-ri ===
Haenam-ri (해남리,海南里) has the Bongdae mountain.

=== Haewŏl-li ===
Haewŏl-li (해월리,海月里) was named after Mount Haewol.The place has a Walnut forest that was formed after the Korean War.

=== Honam-ri ===
Honam-ri (호남리,湖南里) is located at the south of Namdaeji pond.

=== Hosŏ-ri ===
Hosŏ-ri (호서리,湖西里) is located on the west side of Namdaeji Pond.

=== Hwayang-ri ===
Hwayang-ri (화양리,華陽里) was named for its Sunny lands.

=== Kaeal-li ===
개안리 (개안리,開安里) was named for being inside the two streams of water.

=== Ohyŏl-li ===
Ohyŏl-li (오현리,梧玄里) was named after Oseongri and Hyonjukri.

=== Palsal-li ===
Palsal-li (발산리,鉢山里) is named after Palsan Mountain which was named as such for resembling a rice bowl.

=== Pongdŏng-ri ===
Pongdŏng-ri (봉덕리,鳳悳里) was named after Pong of Pongdoksa temple and Dok of Doksan. The region is known for its chestnuts and persimmons.

=== Puhŭng-ri ===
Puhŭng-ri (부흥리,富興里) was formed from merging Putori and Hungunri.The ri is known for its rice.

=== P'ungch'ŏl-li ===
P'ungch'ŏl-li (풍천리,楓川里) was named as such for its Korean butterfly maples and rivers.

=== Rajinp'o-ri ===
Rajinp'o-ri (라진포리,羅津浦里) was named as such for its ports.

=== Ryongho-ri ===
Ryongho-ri (룡호리,龍虎里) was named after Yonggak mountain and Tiger mound. The town produces clay pottery.

=== Sinyang-ri ===
Sinyangri (신양리,新陽里) was formed from merging Ilsinri and Choyangri.

=== Soa-ri ===
Soa-ri (소아리,小雅里) is a ri formed from Sohyolli and Ahyolli. Bronze Age mirror was found in the region. Villages of Golmol, and Jaemol is located. Bingseokdong is also located here, where ice is found.

=== Sojŏng-ri ===
Sojŏng-ri (소정리,素井里) is a ri that was named after a well located in the region.

=== Tonam-ri ===
Tonam-ri (도남리,桃南里) is a ri that was named as such because of the former subdivision Tosungri and the fact that it is at the south of Pyongsan County. Rodong sinmun and KCNA reported on the story of the 12th work team from Tonamri regarding the agricultural production achievements of the region at the collective farm.

=== Tongsal-li ===
Tongsal-li (동산리,東山里) is a ri, that was named as such for its mountain in the east. The ri was originally named Gopori but was changed to its current name in 1991.

=== Waryong-ri ===
Waryong-ri (와룡리,臥龍里) is a ri that was originally part of Songchongmyeon but was named to its current name because it is a village under Waryong mountain(named as such for resembling a dragon lying down.).The region is known for its fields and the Waryong collective farm is located here. Namugol, the region where American Methodist missionary H.G. Jones used as his mission camp in 1897 was located here. The region currently hosts the North Korean propaganda Mosaic mural "Always with the road for the people(언제나 인민을 위한 길에 함께 계시며)" depicting on the spot guidance. Samjongguji pond, along with the river called the Samjonggujigae, is located on the west of the Waryongri. Dolbong mountain is located in the south of Waryongri. The ri also has a town called solbalmal known for pine trees.

== Transportation ==
Yŏnan county is served by the Paech'ŏn Line of the Korean State Railway.

== See also ==
- Hambakseom: Island in the county that confused South Korean authorities due to conflicting positions of the South Korean authorities.
