= Mirok Li =

Korean writer (1899–1950)

- Hangul: 이의경
- Hanja: 李儀景
- RR: I Uigyeong
- MR: I Ŭigyŏng

Pen name
- Hangul: 이미륵
- Hanja: 李彌勒
- RR: I Mireuk
- MR: I Mirŭk

Mirok Li (Korean: 이미륵; March 8, 1899 – March 20, 1950) was a Korean writer who spent much of the twentieth century in exile in Germany. Li was responsible for translating several Korean stories into German.

== Biography ==
Growing up alongside four siblings, the youngest child and only son of a landowner, Li grew into the Confucian custom, guided by the strict social order. At the age of four, he was introduced by his father to the Chinese script and the Chinese classics. In 1905, he attended the village school and was taught in the ancient Korean style (sodang). In 1910, education at Haidju-school changed according to the notions of Japan, which had recently completed the colonization of Korea. One year later, at age 11, he was married to his wife, Choe Mun-ho.

In 1914, he took a visit to the "new school" again but had to stop his education due to a disease that would accompany him throughout his life. Nevertheless, in order to pass the entrance exam to the university, he got 2 years and could continue through 1917, a distance learning medical record at the Kyungsung School of Medicine in Seoul. During this time he had two children: in 1917 his son was born, and in 1919, Myung-ju, his daughter, was born.

In May 1920, he achieved his goal and in 1922 moved to Würzburg, and a year later continued his medical studies in Heidelberg. However, even in Germany he remained ill and had to interrupt his studies for a long time.

It was not until 1925 when he was able to resume his studies in Munich again, when he changed his fields of study to zoology, botany and anthropology. In 1928, he submitted his doctoral dissertation on "Regulatory phenomena in the regeneration of planaria under abnormal conditions," and received a doctorate.

In 1931, Li published short articles, such as the publication of "Night in a Korean street" in Dame. He found support from Professor Seyler, who became his patron, and later moved to Gräfelfing. In 1946, he published his autobiographical novel "The Yalu River flows", which was translated and published in South Korea in 1959 and made him instantly famous. Li took the place of his birth name, Eui-kyeong, for his literary activity to the Korean name "Mi-rok" of the Bodhisattva Maitreya.

The last two years of his life Li devoted to his work as a lecturer in Korean language, Chinese and Japanese literature and history in the East Asian Institute at the Ludwig-Maximilians-Universität München. Li died on 20 March 1950 and his tomb is still in Gräfelfinger cemetery. Large parts of his literary creation Li burned shortly before his death and therefore were not preserved for posterity.

== Japanese occupation protests of 1919 ==
Li helped with printing and distributing leaflets in denunciation of the Japanese occupation. This got him into trouble and he fled at the urging of his mother in 1919 to Shanghai, China. There, he demonstrated in front of the Korean Provisional Government in exile and before continuing to Germany.

== Legacy ==
Li is revered for his involvement in Germany, surrounded by his friends and supporters as "an ambassador between cultures" beyond the grave.

In the summer/autumn of 2008 a TV three-part series called "The Yalu River flows" was made, which recounted Mirok Li's life. It was directed by Lee Jonghan and produced for South Korea's SBS TV station in cooperation with Bavarian Radio. Shot on location in Germany, the recreated scenes (Heidelberg, monastery Münsterschwarzach, Munich, Germany) were done by the Munich Film Production Naumann organization. The role of Mirok Li is performed by three actors: Noh Min Woo as a child, as a young man (1920–1932) by Sung-Ho Choi, and in the scenes until his death (1933–1950) by Byok-Woo Song. The three hour-long episodes were aired in South Korea in November 2008.

== Works ==
- The other dialect. Sungshin Women's University Press, Seoul 1984.
- Iyagi. Korean short stories. EOS Verlag, St. Ottilie, 1996, ISBN 3-88096-300-2.
- Japanese poetry. Müller & Kiepenheuer, Munich 1949.
- From the Yalu to the Isar River: Narratives. Benedict Press, Waegwan 1982.
- The Yalu River flows: A youth in Korea. EOS Verlag, St. Ottilie, 1996, ISBN 3-88096-299-5 (reprinted ed. Munich 1946).
