= Bibyeonsa =

Korean government organization

Bibyeonsa(Korean: 비변사; Hanja: 備邊司), Border Defense Council of Joseon is the supreme administrative organ since mid-Joseon whose other names were like Biguk or Joosa. The council took alternative initiative instead of Uijeongbu, State Council of Joseon, distinctively after the twice invasion from Japan and from Qing.

== Background ==
The politics of Joseon separated affairs of the state from the military functions which kept military functionaries from being involved in the state affairs strictly. The affairs of the state, therefore, had been limited to the State council of Joseon (general officers) in terms of not only civil affairs but also the policies on the national security. Upper two ranks of the bureaucrats made the resolutions on the broad issues to ratify essential articles or policies of the government. While several invasions had happened from the north and south during Seongjong, it became clear that it was insufficient to set up the platforms of the security only by the general officers. The alternatives were allowing the higher military officers to participate in the process of establishing security maneuvers to meticulously keep a keen eye on the issues of the border. Those newly incorporated military bureaucrats were called Jibyeonsa Jaesang (지변사재상; 知邊司宰相)).

== Establishment ==
In 1510, the Japanese residents living in Sampo broke out in an uprising, following tough restrictions against the rocketing number of Japanese residences without official permission to stay in Joseon. Although the government initially permitted Japanese to stay in Sampo for only 60 people, the scale of the residence became significant enough to provoke several kinds of conflicts or quarrel with local people. To address this issue, the government started to place sanctions on several affairs dealing with Japanese residents. As the incident broke out, Bibyeonsa, the Council gained its establishment whose role was just simple without any distinctive function - only for emergencies like exterior invasion.

== Transition ==
In 1554, it was the compromise that designated the council as the independent organ of deciding affairs of the state under the royal commands. The authorities of the Royal Council (Bibyonsa) became a lot more significant after the Japanese invasion in 1592 and its latter aggression. The role of the organ came to take hold of most of the affairs including general administration but even diplomatic issues, economy and politics - in this sense, the genuine supreme organ called Uijeongbu came to lose its role.

Since 1592, higher officers of the State Council, Uijeonbu also came to sit in both seats for Border Defense council, which also affected several related officials not only who are concerned about defense but also who are concerned with totally different sectors such as education. As the expansion of authorities in terms of the council had been achieved in such a short time, some criticized reckless operation, insisting that the council should be abolished. For example, the council could even take responsibility for personnel policies - irrelevant issue regarding the first intention of the organ - national security.

== System ==
According to Sokdaejeon, the official code in latter Joseon, the highest rank officials in each divisions took charge of the service in the Royal Council.

The book 《Bibyeonsa Deungrok》 (비변사등록) has been conveying the records in terms of the critical articles and platforms confirmed by the Border Defense Council.

== See also ==
- Six Ministries of Joseon
- Joseon Dynasty politics
- History of Korea

== Notes ==
- Han Woo-Keun, translated by Kyung-Shik Lee, The History of Korea, Eul-Yoo Pub, 1970, p. 298.
- James B. Palais, Politics and Policy in Traditional Korea, Harvard University Press, 1991, p. 118.
- Ki-baik Lee, translated by Edward W. Wagner, A New History of Korea, Harvard University Press, 1984, p. 209.
