= Paechon County =

Coordinates: 37.9797°N 126.3042°E

Paech'ŏn County 배천군
- County

Korean transcription(s)
  - Hanja: 白川郡
  - McCune-Reischauer: Paech'ŏn-gun
  - Revised Romanization: Baecheon-gun
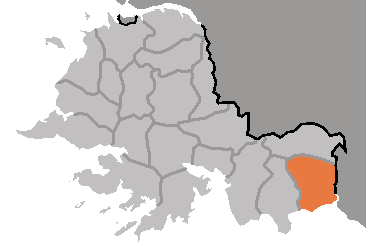
- Country: North Korea
- Province: South Hwanghae Province

Area
  - Total: 512.4 km^{2} (197.8 sq mi)

Population (2008)
  - Total: 159,825
  - Density: 311.9/km^{2} (807.9/sq mi)

Paech'ŏn County is a county in South Hwanghae province, North Korea.

== Etymology ==
The modern name comes from a corruption of the old name "Paikju" (白州) which originated from the region's role as a silver mine. The syllable ju was replaced with chon following the name convention at the time. The region was also called Unsan (銀山, Silver Mountain) because of this.

== History ==
The region was called Toraphyeon (The word Torap had the meaning of a big town in the local language) during the time of Goguryeo, and was historically known as Paikju since 940. In 1403, the word Paechon first appears after the region got this name.The county was officially created in 1895, but was re-merged into Yeonbaek county in 1915. The modern county was recreated from some areas of the former Yeonbaek County in 1952. Paech'ŏn county became part of South Hwanghae in 1954.

== Administrative divisions ==
Paech'ŏn county is divided into 1 ŭp (town), 1 rodongjagu (workers' district) and 26 ri (villages):

- Paech'ŏn-ŭp (배천읍, 白川邑) - Administrative capital of the subdivision.
- Pongryang-rodongjagu (봉량로동자구, 鳳兩勞動者區) -The name comes from the former subdivisions of Bipong-ri (飛鳳里) and Ryangchon-ri (兩川里).
- Chŏngch'ol-li
- Ch'angp'o-ri
- Ch'ujŏng-ri
- Hangjŏng-ri
- Hŭngyŏl-li
- Hwasal-li
- Hwayang-ri
- Ilgong-ri
- Kangho-ri (강호리, 江湖里) - name comes from the former subdivisions of Seongho-ri (星湖里) and Kangseo-ri (江西里). The area controlled by the subdivision also included the area of the former Upo-ri (牛浦里).
- Kŭmgong-ri
- Kŭmsal-li
- Kŭmsŏng-ri
- Mulgil-li
- Munsal-li - Aho-dong is located here.
- Obong-ri
- Panghyŏl-li
- Ponghwa-ri
- Ryongdong-ri
- Ryuch'ŏl-li
- Sŏksal-li
- Subong-ri
- Suwŏl-li
- Ulgil-li
- Unsal-li
- Wŏnsal-li
- Yŏkku-ri

== Transportation ==
Paech'ŏn county is served by the Paech'ŏn Line of the Korean State Railway.
