= Chŏng Munbu =

Korean military leader (1565–1624)

Duke Ch'ungŭi Chŏng Munbu
- South Korean government standard portrait of Chŏng, produced in 2005
- Born: 19th day, 2nd month of 1565; Hansŏng, Joseon
- Died: 29th day, 11th month of 1624; Hansŏng, Joseon
- Cause of death: Torture
- Burial place: Tomb of Chŏng Munbu; Uijeongbu, South Korea
- Military career
- Allegiance: Joseon
- Conflicts: Imjin War; Battle of Haejŏngch'ang; Pukkwan campaign

Korean name
- Hangul: 정문부
- Hanja: 鄭文孚
- RR: Jeong Munbu
- MR: Chŏng Munbu

Art name
- Hangul: 농포
- Hanja: 農圃
- RR: Nongpo
- MR: Nongp'o

Courtesy name
- Hangul: 자허
- Hanja: 子虛
- RR: Jaheo
- MR: Chahŏ

Posthumous name
- Hangul: 충의
- Hanja: 忠毅
- RR: Chungui
- MR: Ch'ungŭi

Chŏng Munbu (Korean: 정문부; Hanja: 鄭文孚; 19th day, 2nd month of 1565 – 29th day, 11th month of 1624) was a Korean scholar-official and military leader of the mid-Joseon period. He is remembered for his role as a commander of a righteous army (civilian militia) during the 1592–1598 Imjin War.

Born in 1565 in Hansŏng, he passed the state civil service examination in 1588 and entered government service as a civil official. In 1591, he relocated to Hamgyong Province, where he worked in a military administration position.

With the outbreak of the Imjin War in 1592 and the subsequent advance of Japanese forces into Hamgyong Province, Chŏng organized and led a righteous army against the Japanese forces and their local Korean collaborators. He ran several successful campaigns against Japanese forces that ultimately resulted in their expulsion from Hamgyong Province. Despite these accomplishments, Chŏng did not receive significant official recognition, owing to a false report on his activities submitted to the royal court by another politician, Yun T'agyŏn.

After the war, Chŏng served in various government positions. In 1615, he resigned from his post as Magistrate of Kilju and withdrew from public life. In 1623, he was appointed Mayor of Jeonju. In 1624, Chŏng was falsely accused of being involved in a plot against King Injo and was arrested. He died from torture during his imprisonment.

In 1665, Chŏng was posthumously exonerated and granted various ceremonial titles and positions. Shrines such as Ch'angnyŏlsa in Ŏrang and Hyŏnch'ungsa in Kyŏngsŏng were established in his honor. In 1709, the Pukkwan Victory Monument was erected in Kilju to commemorate his military achievements.

== Early life ==
Chŏng Munbu was born on the 19th day, 2nd month of 1565, in Namso-dong, Hansŏng, Joseon. He was the second son of Chŏng Sin (정신; 鄭愼) and a lady of the Gangneung Kim clan. His paternal lineage was the Haeju Chŏng clan, a distinguished family noted for producing successive generations of high-ranking officials. Both his grandfather, Chŏng Ŏn'gak, and his father had passed the state civil service examinations and served in various official capacities.

From an early age, Chŏng Munbu was considered to possess exceptional literary talent. At the age of seven, he composed a five-character poem titled "The Beauty of Jade Cannot Compare to the Cold Hue of the Crow" (옥안불급한아색; 玉顔不及寒鴉色). At age eight, he authored the poem "Crescent" (初月; 초월), a work that garnered widespread acclaim. At age fourteen, he attained first place in the Preliminary Civil Service Examination (陞補試; 승보시) with his poem "In the Bright Moonlight, Flowers Fall and Dusk Returns" (月明花落又黃昏; 월명화락우황혼). This work, along with that of Yi Hangbok, was later introduced to the Ming dynasty of China as an examplary specimen of Joseon examination poetry.

In 1585, Chŏng passed both the Classics Licentiate Examination (生員試; 생원시) and Literary Licentiate Examination (進士試; 진사시), thereby earning the title of saengwŏn. In 1588, he successfully passed the triennial state civil service examination, achieving second place honors.

== Early career ==
Chŏng's careers before the Imjin War
Year	Office	Post	Rank	Note
1588	Sŭngmunwŏn	Assistant Proofreader	9B	
1588	Sŭngmunwŏn	Proofreader	9A	
1588	Hansŏngbu	Adjutant Officer	7A	
1589	Sŭngjŏngwŏn	Recorder	7A	
1589	Hongmun'gwan	Sixth Counselor	6A	(Note: served concurrently as an Assistant Compiler (記事官; 기사관))
1589	Saganwŏn	Fourth Censor	6A	(Note: served concurrently as a First-tier Confucian Instructor)
1590	Sahŏnbu	Fourth Inspector	5A	(Note: served concurrently as a Drafter of Royal Decrees)
1591	Hamgyong	Assistant Commander	6A	

Chŏng began his career in 1588 as an Assistant Proofreader (副正字; 부정자) at the Office of Diplomatic Correspondence (承文院; 승문원). He then advanced rapidly through the ranks: in November of the same year, he was promoted to Proofreader (正字; 정자), and in the 12th month, he received further appointment as an Adjutant Officer (參軍; 참군) at the Hansŏng Magistracy (漢城府; 한성부). In 1589, he was promoted to Sixth Counselor (修撰; 수찬) at the Office of Special Advisors and subsequently held dual positions as Fourth Censor (正言; 정언) at the Office of the Censor-General and the First-tier Confucian Instructor (中學敎授; 중학교수).

In the summer of 1590, Chŏng was appointed as a Drafter of Royal Decrees, tasked with drafting royal edicts, composing diplomatic correspondence, and preparing formal documents for court ceremonies. Later that winter, he was promoted to the fifth senior rank and appointed as Fourth Inspector (持平; 지평) at the Office of the Inspector-General.

In the 8th month of 1591, Chŏng was appointed Assistant Military Commander (兵馬評事; 병마평사) of Hamgyong Province, a position ranked at the sixth senior grade. Although the post was of a lower rank than his previous office as a Fourth Inspector, it carried significant authority over regional military administration. Chŏng voluntarily accepted the transfer, seeking to overcome the obstacles to his advancement in the central government that stemmed from the political repercussions associated with his grandfather Chŏng Ŏn'gak's involvement in the 1547 Chŏngmi Purge.

== Imjin War ==
=== Service in Hamgyong and outbreak of the Imjin War ===
As Assistant Military Commander of Hamgyong Province, Chŏng Munbu primarily assisted the Provincial Military Commander (兵馬節度使; 병마절도사) in matters of defense. He undertook regular inspections of the Six Garrisons, overseeing troop training, military infrastructure, and supply stockpiles in preparation for potential Jurchen incursions. Beyond military affairs, Chŏng also focused on local governance. He provided Confucian education to provincial students and actively worked to eliminate administrative abuses, thereby earning the trust and support of the local population.

In 1592, following the outbreak of the Imjin War and the advance of the Japanese Second Division under Katō Kiyomasa into Hamgyong Province, Chŏng Munbu, serving as Assistant Military Commander, coordinated the defense of the region alongside Han Kŭkham, the Provincial Military Commander of Hamgyong. However, on the 18th day, 7th month, their forces were defeated at the Battle of Haejŏngch'ang and Chŏng retreated to Haech'on in Kyŏngsŏng. On the 24th day, 7th month, Prince Imhae and Prince Sunhwa, who had been dispatched to mobilize royal reinforcements, were captured by Japanese forces following an internal revolt by Kuk Kyŏngin.

=== Formation of a righteous army ===
In response, Chŏng Munbu pledged to raise a righteous army (civilian militia) in collaboration with former provincial governor Yi Sŏngim (李聖任; 이성임). They joined forces with local officials, including Magistrate of Kyŏngwŏn O Ŭngt'ae (吳應台; 오응태), and Na Chŏngŏn (羅廷彦; 나정언), Magistrate of Kyŏnghŭng, and advanced toward Kyŏngsŏng. However, their campaign was thwarted by Japanese collaborator Kuk Sep'il, resulting in their defeat and subsequent disbandment.

At the time, many indigenous inhabitants of Hamgyong Province collaborated with the Japanese (they were dubbed sunwae). They frequently captured and delivered local officials to the Japanese. To evade such dangers, Chŏng Munbu sought refuge at the residence of a shaman named Han In'gan (韓仁侃; 한인간). Later, Chŏng relocated to the residence of his disciple Chi Tarwŏn (池達源; 지달원) in Kyŏngsŏng. In the 8th month, Chŏng was convinced by Chi Tarwŏn and Ch'oe Paech'ŏn (崔配天; 최배천) to organize a righteous army again. Together, they devised plans to form a righteous army at the home of Yi Pungsu (李鵬壽; 이붕수) in Kyŏngsŏng, where several commanders, including Kang Munu (姜文佑; 강문우) and Chŏng Hyŏllyong, assembled to offer their support.

Chŏng Munbu sought to appoint Chŏng Hyŏllyong—his senior in official rank—as the leader of the righteous army. However, Chŏng Hyŏllyong declined, stating that he was unfit to shoulder such a heavy responsibility. Meanwhile, the majority of the militia argued that Chŏng Munbu, having already gained the trust and respect of the local populace, was best suited to serve as commander. In deference to both popular sentiment and the pressing need for unified leadership, Chŏng accepted command and assumed leadership of the righteous army.

On the 16th day, 9th month of 1592, Chŏng Munbu led his righteous army to reclaim Kyŏngsŏng, which was then held by Kuk Sep'il. Chŏng successfully persuaded Kuk to surrender the fortress by not only leveraging the threat of Jurchen incursions but also mediating through Ch'oe Paech'ŏn. Following the peaceful occupation, Chŏng issued a proclamation declaring the formation of the righteous army and urging locals to participate in the resistance. Numerous reinforcements answered his call and joined.

=== Pukkwan campaign ===
==== Early battles in 1592 ====
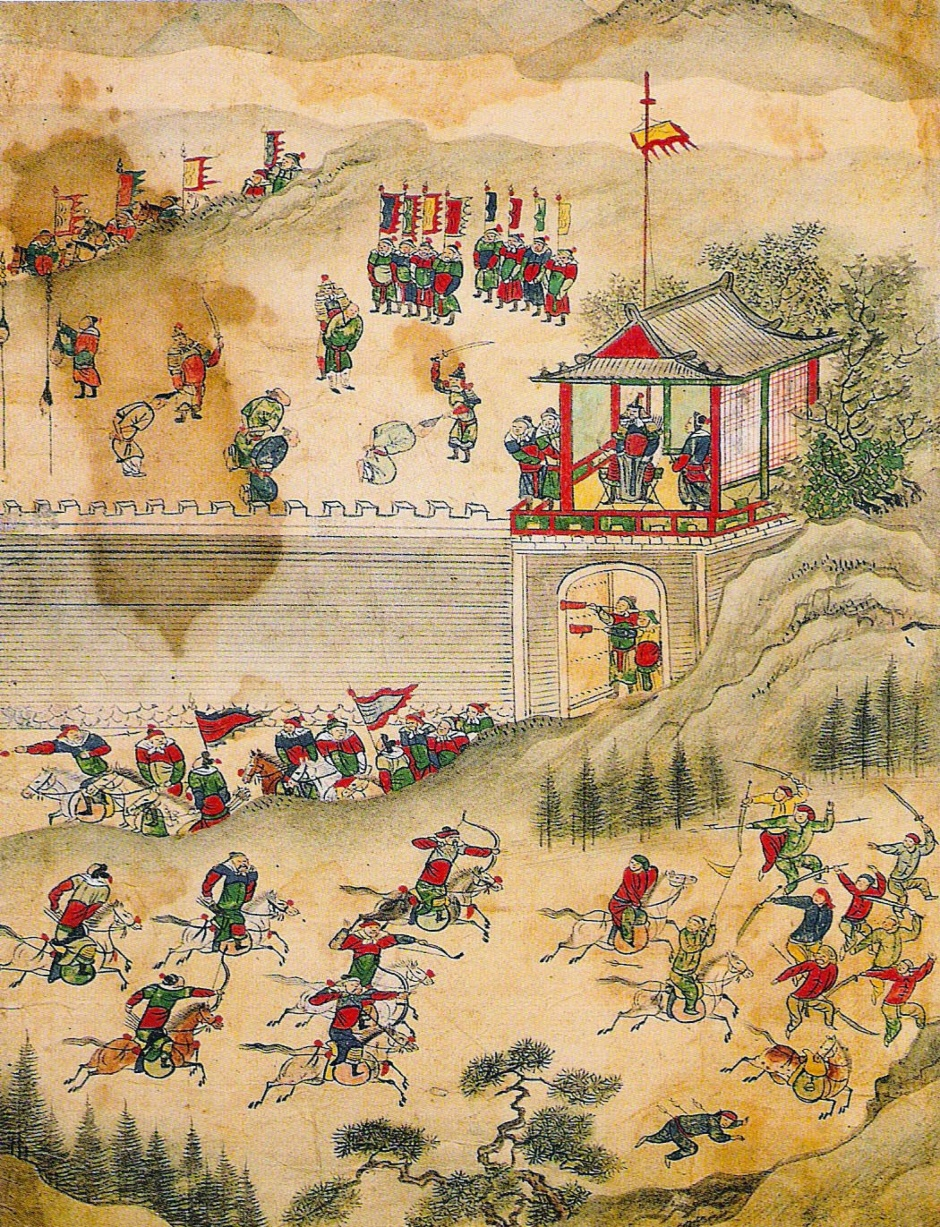
The painting Ch'angŭit'owaedo (倡義討倭圖; 창의토왜도) depicts a battle against Japanese forces and executions of collaborators.

Chŏng Munbu attempted but failed to convince Kuk Kyŏngin to surrender. Instead, Kuk allied himself with Japanese forces and began preparing for a joint assault on Kyŏngsŏng. In response, Confucian students O Yunjŏk (吳允迪; 오윤적) and Sin Sejun (申世俊; 신세준) took the lead in executing this policy; after O's arrest, Sin mobilized armed men and assassinated Kuk Kyŏngin. In Myŏngch'ŏn, a failed uprising against Chŏng Malsu (鄭末守; 정말수) was later succeeded by forces under Ku Hwang (具滉; 구황) and Kang Munu, who were dispatched by Chŏng. Upon regaining Myŏngch'ŏn, Chŏng ordered the execution of Kuk Sep'il and remaining collaborators, thereby eliminating internal resistance across Hamgyong Province.

Following the consolidation of control, Chŏng reorganized his forces into three main divisions—central, left, and right—under the respective command of Chŏng Hyŏllyong, Yu Kyŏngch'ŏn (柳擎天; 유경천), and O Ŭngt'ae. Smaller ambush units were also positioned under Wŏn Ch'ungsŏ (元忠恕; 원충서) to maximize tactical mobility. On the 30th day, 10th month, Wŏn executed a successful ambush against a Japanese unit returning from a massacre in Myŏngch'ŏn, forcing them to retreat to the mountain Changdŏksan (長德山; 장덕산). The righteous army secured the summit and launched a coordinated assault, driving the Japanese into a valley where they were trapped. That night, a heavy snowfall incapacitated the Japanese troops, enabling the righteous army to encircle and destroy them. This decisive victory cemented Chŏng Munbu's strategic control over the northeastern front.

==== Conflict with Yun T'agyŏn ====
While serving concurrently as Assistant Military Commander and Commander of the righteous army, Chŏng Munbu occupied a dual role that blurred the line between official military authority and civilian volunteer leadership. On the battlefield, he led the righteous army as its commander, yet following engagements, he submitted reports to the central government in his capacity as a government official. This ambiguous position became a source of friction with Yun T'agyŏn, the Provincial Patrol Commissioner (巡察使; 순찰사) of Hamgyong.

Yun, having assumed command over the province's military affairs on the 10th day, 7th month of 1592, expected that Chŏng would operate under his supervision. However, from Chŏng Munbu's perspective reportedly, Yun's repeated interference not only undermined morale among the righteous army but also attempted to appropriate the achievements of the righteous army. Therefore, Chŏng bypassed Yun when submitting official reports and independently exercised military and administrative functions, including granting rewards and pardons—actions which Yun regarded as exceeding his authority and violating bureaucratic protocol. Viewing Chŏng's autonomous operations as insubordinate, Yun formally censured him on four occasions. The deteriorating relationship ultimately culminated in Chŏng's forced resignation as commander of the righteous army on the 21st day, 11th month, when Yun appointed Chŏng Hyŏllyong as his successor.

==== Reappointment and late battles in 1593 ====
Following his resignation, Chŏng Munbu resumed his duties as Assistant Military Commander, focusing on the defense of the northern frontier against Jurchen incursions. Although the position of righteous army commander was initially handed over to Chŏng Hyŏllyong and later to O Ŭngt'ae, both successors failed to command the same respect and cohesion among the volunteers. Discontent grew within the ranks, with many soldiers voicing dissatisfaction and defecting. In response to the mounting instability and erosion of morale, Chŏng was reinstated as commander of the righteous army on the 13th day, 1st month of 1593.

On the 22nd day, 1st month of 1593, Chŏng Munbu responded to a request for assistance from Kang Ch'an (姜燦; 강찬), the magistrate of Tanchon, by dispatching 200 troops under four commanders, including Ku Hwang. Using a decoy maneuver at Macheollyeong, Chŏng's forces ambushed a 900-man Japanese garrison, killing approximately 170 without sustaining casualties. Later that month, as Katō Kiyomasa led a massive force to relieve besieged Japanese troops in Kilju, Chŏng strategically lay in ambush and engaged the Japanese at Paekt'apkyo (白塔郊; 백탑교) on the 28th day, 1st month. Although his forces inflicted heavy losses on the enemy, they also suffered significant casualties and retreated to Myŏngch'ŏn for reorganization. That night, Katō's forces, having reunited with the isolated Japanese garrison in Kilju, withdrew toward Anbyŏn. With this retreat, Chŏng Munbu and the righteous army completed the recapture of Hamgyong Province.

=== After the Pukkwan campaign ===
Chŏng Munbu's official careers during war
Year	Office	Post	Rank	Note	Ref.
1593–1594	Yŏnghŭng	Magistrate	3B	府使; 부사	
1594–1595	Onsŏng	Magistrate	3B	府使; 부사	
1596–1597	Kilju	Magistrate	3A	牧使; 목사	
1597–1598	Gongju	Magistrate	3A	牧使; 목사	

Despite his pivotal role in the successful recapture of Hamgyong Province, Chŏng Munbu's contributions were not fully acknowledged by the central government. This was because Provincial Governor Yun T'agyŏn did not accurately report Chŏng's achievements. Instead, the court attributed the victory primarily to Chŏng Hyŏllyong and appointed him as Provincial Military Commander. Chŏng Munbu was instead granted the lesser post of Magistrate of Yŏnghŭng on the 9th day, 4th month, 1593, in recognition only of his efforts in suppressing internal collaborators, rather than for his leadership in liberating the province.

He continued to serve in key administrative roles within the province, including appointments as Magistrate of Onsŏng and Magistrate of Kilju. In the 11th month of 1596, amid rising concerns over a potential second Japanese invasion, he was reassigned to the strategically important position of Magistrate of Gongju.

== Post-war career ==
Chŏng Munbu's official careers after war
Year	Office	Post	Rank	Ref.
Seonjo Period
1599	Changyewŏn	Chief Judge	3A	
1599	Hojo	Third Minister	3A	
1600	Yongyangwi	Assistant Protector	4B	
1601	Yejo	Second Minister	2B	
1603	Chungch'ubu	Associate Director	2B	
1604	Chungch'ubu	Associate Councillor	3A	
1604–1606	Mourning period			
1606–1607	Changdan	Magistrate	3B	
Gwanghaegun Period
1611	Namwŏn	Magistrate	3B	
1611–1613	Kilju	Magistrate	3A	
1613–1618	Seclusion Period			
1618	Ch'angwŏn	Magistrate	3A	
Injo Period
1623	Jeonju	Mayor	2B	
1623–1624	Mourning Period			

=== Seonjo period ===
In the 11th month of 1598, Chŏng resigned from government service and retired to his home village. In 1599, Chŏng Munbu returned to government service upon his appointment as Chief Judge (判決事; 판결사) of the Bureau of Slaves (掌禮院; 장례원). He was subsequently promoted to Third Minister (參議; 참의) of Taxation, and in 1600, appointed Assistant Military Protector (副護軍; 부호군) of the Yongyang Military Command (龍驤衛; 용왕위). In 1601, residents of Hamgyong petitioned the court to recognize his meritorious service in repelling Japanese forces. In response, he was promoted to a Second Minister (參判; 참판) of the Rites, a senior second-rank position.

In 1603, Chŏng was appointed Associate Director (同知事; 동지사) of the Privy Council (中樞府; 중추부). The following year, however, he was demoted to Associate Councillor (僉知事; 첨지사). In the 8th month of 1603, he left office upon the death of his father and observed the traditional mourning period for two years in Songsan. After completing mourning on the 4th day, 11th month of 1606, he was appointed Magistrate of Changdan.

=== Gwanghaegun period and resignation ===
In 1610, the year after King Gwanghaegun's accession, Chŏng was selected as Envoy for Gratitude Missions (謝恩副使; 사은부사) to the Ming court in Beijing. In the 8th month of 1611, he was appointed Magistrate of Namwŏn, where he actively promoted Confucian learning and scholarly exchange. In consideration of his favorable reputation in Hamgyong Province, he was reappointed Magistrate of Kilju. On the 20th day, 4th month of 1612, he was named Second Minister of Law Enforcement (刑曹; 형조), but he requested reassignment to an external post in order to care for his aging mother.

Amid intensifying factional strife in 1613, Chŏng withdrew from office and returned to private life. Dividing his time between Songsan and Seoul, he lived in seclusion, avoiding entanglement with powerful elites. Although he was later nominated for high posts such as Second Minister of Military Affairs (兵曹; 병조) and Rites, he declined to accept any appointments.

=== Reappointment and Injo period ===
On the 5th day, 7th month of 1618, under growing pressure from the ruling faction, Chŏng reluctantly accepted the post of Magistrate of Ch'angwŏn. During his tenure, he fostered Confucian scholarship, constructed the pavilion Samijŏng (思美亭; 사미정), and restored Wŏryŏngdae, where he pursued literary leisure and composed ten poems on historical subjects.

Following the enthronement of King Injo in 1623, Chŏng was appointed Mayor of Jeonju in the 4th month. However, in the 7th month of that year, upon the death of his mother, he returned to Songsan for mourning. During this period, his health deteriorated significantly, and he developed a severe abscess. In the 1st month of 1624, following the outbreak of Yi Kwal's Rebellion, King Injo appointed Chŏng, despite being in mourning, as Deputy Commander (副摠管; 부총관) and ordered him to return to government service on the recommendation of Chief State Councillor Yi Wŏnik. However, due to severe abscess, he was unable to comply with the appointment.

== Final years ==
=== Pak Honggu's treason conspiracy ===
In the 11th month of 1624, Chŏng Munbu was arrested on suspicion of involvement in a treason conspiracy led by Pak Honggu. The conspirators, including Pak Yunjang (朴允章; 박윤장) and Pak Naejang (朴來章; 박내장), plotted to enthrone Grand Prince Inseong and restore the deposed King Gwanghaegun as King Emeritus (T'aesangwang). As part of their plans, they discussed appointing Chŏng as the vanguard commander of the rebel forces. To gauge Chŏng's willingness to participate, they sought to approach him through Yi Taegŏm (李大檢; 이대검), an acupuncturist who had been treating Chŏng for an abscess. Through this intermediary, the conspirators intended to probe Chŏng's stance.

The plot was uncovered on the 8th day, 11th month, and during subsequent interrogations on the 11th day, 11th month, testimony emerged indicating that Chŏng had been designated as a prospective commander. As a result, he was subjected to official investigation. During interrogation, Chŏng Munbu consistently maintained his innocence. Yi Taegŏm testified that he had never mentioned the conspiracy to Chŏng, thereby confirming Chŏng's noninvolvement. On the 17th day, 11th month, Left State Councillor Yun Pang submitted a report concluding that there was no evidence that Chŏng had accepted the treasonous proposal.

=== Poem about King Huai of Chu ===
楚離三戶逆秦亡 末必南公說得當
一入武關民望絶 孱孫何事又懷王

With only three households left, Chu destroyed Qin.
The words of Lord Namgong were not entirely right.
Entering through Wu Pass, the people's hopes were severed.
What use is it now for feeble heirs to blame King Huai?

— Chŏng Munbu, 1618

Nevertheless, the Censorate officials (臺諫; 대간) raised issue with a poem about King Huai of Chu Chŏng had composed during his tenure as magistrate of Ch'angwŏn. They accused the poem of implicitly denying the legitimacy of King Injo, who had ascended the throne after the deposition of Gwanghaegun, and of expressing seditious intent.

The poem had actually been composed in 1618, five years before Injo's rise to power through the 1623 Injo Coup, making it chronologically impossible for the poem to target Injo. Moreover, its content was a historical elegy referencing Chinese dynastic precedent, not a political commentary on the Joseon succession. Despite these facts, the Censorate officials did not properly examine the context and subjected Chŏng to severe torture.

=== Death ===
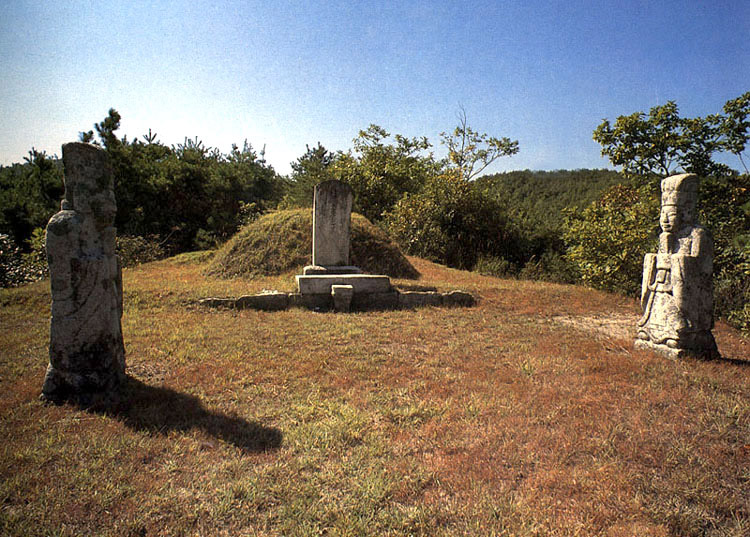
Chŏng's grave in Uijeongbu

Despite severe torture, Chŏng Munbu maintained his innocence. He died of his injuries on the 19th day, 11th month of 1624, at the age of 59. He was buried near his father's grave at Songsan in Yangju, present-day Uijeongbu.

== Legacy ==
=== Exoneration and posthumous titles ===
Chŏng Munbu was officially exonerated in 1665, 41 years after his death. Chief State Councillor Chŏng T'aehwa and Hŏ Chŏk convinced King Hyeonjong that Chŏng Munbu's death had been unjust and that he had accomplished much for the state. Hyeonjong agreed that the controversial poem contained no seditious elements and cleared Chŏng Munbu's reputation.

Subsequently, Hamgyong Governor Min Chŏngjung and Assistant Military Commander Yi Tanha recommended posthumous honors for key contributors to the Pukkwan campaign. Chŏng Munbu was posthumously appointed Right Associate State Councilor (右贊成; 우찬성) of the State Council. In 1713, during the reign of King Sukjong, Chŏng was further honored with the posthumous title "Ch'ungŭi", meaning "Loyal and Resolute", in recognition of his distinguished service.

=== Memorials ===
==== Shrines ====
In 1664, the shrine Ch'angnyŏlsa (彰烈士; 창렬사) was established to commemorate Chŏng. It was constructed in Ŏrang, the site where Chŏng had raised a righteous army at the residence of Yi Pungsu. Chŏng and other key figures of the Pukkwan campaign that had played significant roles in repelling Japanese forces in the northern provinces—namely Yi Pungsu, Ch'oe Paech'ŏn, Kang Munu, and Chi Tarwŏn—were enshrined at the shrine. The shrine was granted official recognition in 1666 of King Hyŏnjong's reign, following a petition submitted by the Censor Yŏ Sŏngje.

In 1703, the shrine Hyŏnch'ungsa (顯忠祠; 현충사) was established in Kyŏngsŏng in honor of Chŏng. He was enshrined there alongside eight other notable figures, including Sin Sejun and O Yunjŏk. The shrine was formally recognized and granted a royal plaque in 1707.

Chŏng was also honored posthumously at other shrines commemorating his contemporaries who had contributed to the war effort. Among them was Ch'ungnyŏlsa (忠烈祠; 충렬사), which was established by Ch'oe Paech'ŏn.

==== Pukkwan Victory Monument ====
In 1700, the Assistant Military Commander of Hamgyong Province Ch'oe Ch'angdae (崔昌大; 최창대) realized that the province had no monuments that commemorated victories in the Imjin War. By contrast, Haengju and Yŏnan had such monuments. Ch'oe ordered that one be created for Chŏng. In 1703, Ch'oe composed the inscription, and in 1709, the Pukkwan Victory Monument was erected in Immyŏng-myeŏn, Kilju County, North Hamgyong Province. The monument is of the dimensions 187 cm × 66 cm × 13 cm (73.6 in × 26.0 in × 5.1 in). On both its front and back surfaces, more than 1,500 characters are inscribed, chronicling Chŏng's exploits and the righteous army under his command.
