= Yun T'agyŏn =

Joseon scholar-official (1538–1594)

Prince Ch'ilgye Yun T'agyŏn
- Born: 15th day, 5th month of 1538; Cheongju, Joseon
- Died: 28th day, 5th month of 1594; Hamhŭng, Joseon
- Occupation: Literati official
- Years active: 1565–1594
- Awards: 3rd Kwangguk Merit Subject

Provincial Governor of Hamgyŏng
- In office 7th month of 1592 – 4th month of 1594
- Preceded by: Yu Yŏngnip
- Succeeded by: Yi Hŭidŭk

Korean name
- Hangul: 윤탁연
- Hanja: 尹卓然
- RR: Yun Takyeon
- MR: Yun T'agyŏn

Art name
- Hangul: 중호
- Hanja: 重湖
- RR: Jungho
- MR: Chungho

Courtesy name
- Hangul: 상중
- Hanja: 尙中
- RR: Sangjung
- MR: Sangjung

Posthumous name
- Hangul: 헌민
- Hanja: 憲敏
- RR: Heonmin
- MR: Hŏnmin

Yun T'agyŏn (Korean: 윤탁연; Hanja: 尹卓然; 15th day, 5th month of 1538 – 28th day, 5th month of 1594) was a literati official who served in the fields of diplomacy, administration, and military affairs during mid-Joseon period.

Born in 1538 in Cheongju, he passed the state civil service examination in 1565 and entered government service as a civil official. Yun remained at King Myeongjong's side at the time of his death and composed the statement reaffirming the king's designation of Seonjo as his successor. He later participated in the compilation of the Veritable Records of King Myeongjong. After holding various official posts, Yun was named a Third-Rank Meritorious Subject of National Restoration in 1591 in recognition of his contributions to resolving the correction of royal genealogy distortion, and was ennobled as Prince of Ch'ilgye.

Following the outbreak of the Imjin War in 1592, he accompanied Prince Imhae northward to Hamgyong Province. In 7th month of 1592, he was appointed as Provincial Patrol Commissioner of Hamgyong, where he established a line of defense at Pyŏlhaebo and worked to fortify the regional defenses. Although he clashed with the militia leader Chŏng Munbu over military command, he ultimately contributed to the expulsion of Japanese forces led by Katō Kiyomasa from the province.

On 28th day, 5th month of 1594, Yun collapsed from overwork and died in his quarters on the front line. Yun was posthumously granted the honorific title Hŏnmin in 1711. Yun was later enshrined in Hongp'osa in Haman and Ch'angŭisa in Hamhung.

== Early life ==
=== Birth and education ===
Yun T'agyŏn was born on 15th day, 5th month of 1538, in Chŏng'an-ri (정안리; 靜安里), Cheongju. He belonged to the Chilwon Yun clan; his father was Yun I (윤이; 尹伊) and his mother was a lady of the Andong Kim clan, the daughter of Kim Yunsŏn (김윤선; 金胤先).

Yun studied under the renowned Neo-Confucian scholar Yi Hwang and was earned acclaim for his exceptional literary talent. He was recognized as one of the "Eight Talents of Literature" (팔문장; 八文章) alongside Yi Sanhae and Song Ikp'il. In 1558, Yun passed the preliminary civil service examination (사마시; 司馬試), and in 1565, he passed the literary section of the special state examination held in the royal presence (알성시; 謁聖試), after which he began his official career at the Office of Diplomatic Correspondence (승문원; 承文院).

=== Early career ===
On 24th day, 6th month of 1567, Yun T'agyŏn was appointed as a Recorder (주서; 注書) of the Royal Secretariat. On 28th day, 6th month of the same year, he was in attendance during King Myeongjong's final moments as part of his official duties. At that time, Myeongjong, whose condition had become critical, was unable to leave a will himself. In his stead, Queen Insun publicly announced that the throne would pass to the third son of Deokheung Daewongun, who later became King Seonjo. Yun T'agyŏn recorded the matter and obtained royal approval from King Myeongjong. Yun was commended for faithfully transcribing the statement using a complex Chinese character for "three" (參) instead of simple character (三), thereby ensuring the authenticity of the record and rendering it immune to forgery.

Following the accession of King Seonjo, Yun T'agyŏn held various government positions, including Recorder (전적; 典籍) and Fourth Censor (정언; 正言) at the Office of the Censor-General. He later served as Vice Envoy (서장관; 書狀官) on a diplomatic mission to Ming China. Upon his return, he was appointed to the Office of Special Advisors and the Bureau of State Records, where he contributed to the compilation of the Veritable Records of King Myeongjong beginning in 1568.

== Career during Seonjo reign ==
=== Diplomatic mission to Ming China ===
In 1573, Yun T'agyŏn was dispatched again to the Ming China as Vice Envoy on a diplomatic mission to address the protracted dispute over the royal genealogy of Joseon known as the Chonggye Pyŏnmu. The purpose of the delegation was to seek correction of a passage in the Collected Statutes of the Ming Dynasty that identified King Taejo, the founder of Joseon, as a descendant of Yi Inim—a nobleman of late Goryeo who had been condemned as a traitor.

On the 28th day, 2nd month of 1573, Yun T'agyŏn departed for Beijing together with Chief Envoy Yun Kŭnsu and Yi Hubaek (이후백; 李後白). They requested that the newly revised Collected Statutes of the Ming Dynasty record that King Taejo of Joseon was not a descendant of Yi Inim and that he had ascended the throne with the support of his subjects. In response, the Wanli Emperor promised that the matters raised by the Joseon delegation would be recorded in detail in the Ming Veritable Records of Emperor Shizong and that the relevant passages would be corrected during the compilation of the Collected Statutes of the Ming Dynasty.

Bearing an imperial edict conveying this promise, the envoys concluded a mission lasting approximately six and a half months and returned home on the 16th day, 9th month of 1573. In recognition of his service, Yun T'agyŏn was promoted in rank, granted land by royal decree, and appointed Fourth Inspector (지평; 持平) at the Office of the Inspector-General. In the 8th month of 1590, following the successful resolution of the Chonggye Pyŏnmu, the court invested those involved in the related diplomatic missions as Kwangguk Merit Subject. Yun T'agyŏn was invested as a third-rank Kwangguk Merit Subject and ennobled as Prince of Ch'ilgye (칠계군; 漆溪君).

=== Local administration ===
After returning from a diplomatic mission to Ming China, Yun T'agyŏn was appointed Fourth Inspector (지평; 持平) at the Office of the Inspector-General—marking his formal reinstatement into the central bureaucracy of the Joseon court. Thereafter, he held a succession of official posts, culminating in his appointment as Magistrate of Tongnae in 1575. The following year, upon the death of his father, Yun resigned from public office to observe the full three-year mourning period, fulfilling his Confucian obligations of filial piety.

Resuming his government service in 1579, Yun was appointed Magistrate of Sangju. During this tenure, he distinguished himself through effective governance and administrative diligence, earning the admiration of local residents who erected a commemorative stele in his honor. In further recognition of his exemplary performance, King Seonjo issued an official commendation, affirming Yun's reputation as a capable provincial administrator. In 1582, when the Yeongnam region was devastated by a severe famine, the royal court specially appointed Yun as Provincial Governor of Kyŏngsang to direct relief efforts. He implemented decisive aid measures, stabilized civil unrest, and safeguarded the livelihoods of the local population. For his meritorious service, he was successively promoted to Minister of Rites and later appointed Mayor of Hansŏng, the capital of Joseon.Yun also held several high-ranking posts in the central government, including three terms as Minister of Justice and two as Minister of Finance.

== Imjin War ==
=== Escorting Prince Imhae ===
On the 13th day, 4th month of 1592, the Imjin War began. When news reached the Joseon court on the 17th day of the same month, King Seonjo dispatched Yi Il and appointed Sin Rip as Supreme Inspector (순변사; 巡邊使) of the Three Provinces. Yun T'agyŏn, affiliated with the Office of the Royal Guard Urimwi (우림위청; 羽林衛廳), was appointed Assistant Prosecuting Commissioner (검찰부사; 檢察副使) on the 25th day of the 4th month, and, together with Yi Yangwŏn, was placed in charge of the defense of Hansŏng.

When news of Sin Rip's defeat reached the court on the 28th day of the 4th month, King Seonjo decided to evacuate the capital. In the course of the evacuation, the king dispatched royal princes to various provinces to recruit loyalist forces, sending Prince Imhae to Hamgyŏng Province. Yun T'agyŏn, together with Kim Kwiyŏng, was assigned to accompany Prince Imhae. At dawn on the 30th day of the 4th month, Prince Imhae departed from Hansŏng and permitted the officials in attendance to return home briefly to bid farewell to their families before rejoining the entourage. Accordingly, Yun T'agyŏn returned home, took leave of his family, and rejoined the prince's retinue on the 1st day of the 5th month.

On the 3rd day of the 5th month, while en route to Kŭmhwa, news reached the party that Japanese forces had captured Chuncheon. In response, Prince Imhae considered abandoning the plan to enter Hamgyŏng Province and instead following King Seonjo to Pyongyang. Yun T'agyŏn, however, argued that in accordance with the king's command they should proceed into Hamgyŏng Province and recruit loyalist forces. The party reached Anbyŏn on the 5th day of the 5th month, crossed Ch'ŏllyŏng Pass on the 7th day, and arrived at Tŏgwŏn on the 9th day, thereafter remaining in the region south of Mach'ŏllyŏng Pass (마천령; 摩天嶺). On the 4th day of the 6th month, Yun T'agyŏn submitted a memorial to the court reporting that Hamgyŏng Province had been severely devastated and requesting a reduction in tribute obligations. However, on the 12th day of the 6th month, Japanese forces under Katō Kiyomasa and Mōri Katsunobu crossed Ch'ŏllyŏng Pass and invaded Hamgyŏng Province, prompting the party to flee to Kyŏngsŏng.

=== Provincial Governor of Hamgyong ===
Yun T'agyŏn was appointed Provincial Governor (관찰사; 觀察使) of Hamgyŏng on the 10th day, 7th month of 1592, succeeding Yu Yŏngnip (유영립; 柳永立), who had been taken prisoner by Japanese forces. Two days later, he was concurrently appointed Provincial Patrol Commissioner (巡察使; 순찰사) of Hamgyong. On the 18th day of the 7th month, after Han Kŭkham, the Provincial Military Commander (병마절도사; 兵馬節度使) of North Hamgyŏng, was defeated at the Battle of Haejŏngch'ang and retreated, Yun T'agyŏn assumed responsibility for that office in an acting capacity.

Yun entered Pyŏrhaebo Fortress (별해보; 別害堡), a military outpost located on the Kaema Plateau, where he sought to organize the defense of Sŏrhallyŏng Pass (설한령; 雪寒嶺) and directed operations against Japanese forces. With regard to his entry into Pyŏrhaebo, the Yŏllyŏsilgisul states that he withdrew there under the pretext of illness. According to historians Ryu Ju-hee and Kim Man-ho, his move to Pyŏrhaebo should be understood, in light of his appointment as Provincial Governor, as a measure undertaken in the course of fulfilling his official duties.

In the 8th month of 1592, Yun T'agyŏn, accepting the proposals of Confucian scholars such as Kim Ŭngbok (김응복; 金應福) and Yi Hŭirok (이희록; 李希祿), resolved to launch an attack against the Japanese forces stationed at Hamhŭng. He summoned Yu Ŭngsu (유응수; 柳應秀), Yi Yuil (이유일; 李惟一), and Pak Chungnip (박중립; 朴中立) as military officers and petitioned the royal court in exile for permission to hold a military examination. Upon receiving King Seonjo's approval, he conducted the examination and, on the 2nd day of the 10th month, selected more than one hundred candidates. Yu Ŭngsu and Yi Yuil were appointed as commanders and dispatched to lead the campaign. Under the command of Sŏng Yunmun, Provincial Military Commander of North Hamgyŏng, they engaged Japanese forces in the vicinity of Hamhŭng.

Although they did not achieve decisive results due to their numerical inferiority, their operations temporarily disrupted communications between Japanese units stationed in North Hamgyŏng Province and South Hamgyŏng Province. Ryu Ju-hee evaluates Yun T'agyŏn's activities as having secured the route through Sŏrhallyŏng Pass, thereby maintaining lines of communication between Hamgyŏng Province and the royal court in exile at Ŭiju.

=== Conflicts with Chŏng Munbu ===
In addition to organizing the formal defense of Hamgyŏng Province, Yun also sought to cooperate with the righteous army. However, Yun came into conflict with Chŏng Munbu, a leader of righteous army in Hamgyong Province. After recapturing Kyŏngsŏng on the 16th day, 9th month of 1592, Chŏng Munbu submitted a report to the royal court in exile on the 20th day, describing the operations through which Japanese forces had been repelled. Yun T'agyŏn learned of this some fifteen days later and submitted a separate report to the royal court in exile concerning the recovery of Kyŏngsŏng.

As Provincial Governor of Hamgyŏng, Yun T'agyŏn objected to Chŏng Munbu's submission of the report directly to the court without routing it through him, and sent an official document reprimanding him. Thereafter, on the grounds that reports of the righteous army's military achievements continued to bypass him, Yun issued a total of four formal censures. However, Chŏng Munbu did not comply with these orders. On the 21st day, 11th month of 1592, Yun T'agyŏn dismissed Chŏng Munbu from his position as commander of the righteous army and appointed Chŏng Hyŏllyong as his successor.

Regarding the cause of the conflict, Lee Jang-hee has argued that Yun T'agyŏn's actions were motivated by resentment toward Chŏng Munbu's military achievements. According to Kim, Jae-cheon, the conflict stemmed from Chŏng Munbu's dual status within both the administrative and military hierarchies. Originally appointed as Assistant Military Commander (兵馬評事; 병마평사) of Northern Hamgyong, Chŏng was later chosen by local communities to lead irregular resistance against Japanese forces. As provincial governor, Yun attempted to place Chŏng's militia under his direct control. However, in his capacity as Commander of the righteous army, Chŏng Munbu sought to retain autonomous control over military operations and, from the perspective of the provincial administration, at times undertook actions beyond the authority of an assistant military commander, including issuing pardons to individuals accused of rebellion.

After Chŏng Munbu stepped down, the righteous army fell into internal disarray, and its operational effectiveness declined markedly. As dissatisfaction spread among the troops, many soldiers left the ranks. Yun T'agyŏn attempted to stabilize the situation by appointing O Ŭngt'ae (오응태; 吳應台) as commander, but this measure failed to restore order. In response to the internal rift within the righteous army, King Seonjo issued an official directive reinstating Chŏng Munbu as its commander. Yun T'agyŏn subsequently submitted his resignation, taking responsibility for the situation, but King Seonjo did not grant it. Chŏng Munbu was reinstated on the 13th day, 1st month of 1593. Shortly afterward, on the 28th day, 1st month of 1593, Japanese forces in Hamgyong were defeated at the Battle of Paekt'apgyo and withdrew from the region.

=== Death ===
Even after the withdrawal of Japanese forces, Yun T'agyŏn remained in Hamhŭng, Chŏngp'yŏng, and Yŏnghŭng, continuing to serve as Provincial Governor of Hamgyŏng. He focused on restoring local stability in the wake of the devastation caused by the war and personally took part in relief efforts, including the distribution of relief grain. In response to a court directive ordering that regular troops from Hamgyŏng Province be dispatched to the southern provinces, he raised objections, citing the persistent threat of Jurchen incursions in the region.

In early 1594, the Office of the Inspector-General submitted several petitions seeking his impeachment on the grounds that he had pursued private interests. Although King Seonjo did not immediately grant the petition, he approved Yun's dismissal from office on the 2nd day, 4th month of 1594. On the 28th day, 5th month of 1594, Yun T'agyŏn died at the Provincial Headquarters of Hamgyŏng in Hamhŭng, having fallen ill after prolonged service in military encampments.

Yun T'agyŏn was posthumously granted the honorific title Hŏnmin (헌민; 憲愍) on the 16th day, 6th month of 1711. Yun was later enshrined in Hongp'osa (홍포사; 鴻浦祠) in Haman in 1787 and in Ch'angŭisa (창의사; 彰義祠) in Hamhŭng in 1797.
