= Chŏng Hyŏllyong =

Korean military leader (1547–1600)

- Born: 1547; Yesan, Joseon
- Died: 1600 (aged 52–53); Joseon
- Burial place: Yesan, South Korea
- Military career
- Allegiance: Joseon
- Conflicts: Imjin War; Pukkwan campaign; Korean–Jurchen border conflicts; Siege of Yŏksu village

Korean name
- Hangul: 정현룡
- Hanja: 鄭見龍
- RR: Jeong Hyeonryong
- MR: Chŏng Hyŏllyong

Courtesy name
- Hangul: 운경
- Hanja: 雲卿
- RR: Ungyeong
- MR: Un'gyŏng

Chŏng Hyŏllyong (Korean: 정현룡; Hanja: 鄭見龍; 1547 – 1600) was a Korean military leader of the mid-Joseon period. He is remembered for his role as a commander of a righteous army (civilian militia) during the Imjin War and subjugation of Yŏksu village in 1594.

Born in 1547 in Yesan County, Chŏng passed the state civil service examination in 1577 and entered government service as a civil official. In 1589, Chŏng Hyŏllyong was appointed Magistrate of Kyŏnghŭng in 1589 upon the recommendation of Sin Rip, and the following year, Chŏng became Magistrate of Chongsŏng. At the outbreak of the Imjin War, Chŏng surrendered to the Japanese and abandoned Chongsŏng. However, Chŏng Hyŏllyong later joined the militia forces of Chŏng Munbu and served as a commander of the central division.

Following the Battle of Paekt'apgyo in 1593, which led to the expulsion of Japanese forces from Hamgyŏng Province, Chŏng was appointed Provincial Military Commander of Northern Hamgyŏng in recognition of his service. As commander, he suppressed uprisings among the frontier Jurchens villages, including that of the Yŏksu tribal settlements. While preparing for potential conflict with the Jurchens, he suffered a severe paralytic stroke and died in 1600 after a prolonged illness.

== Early life and career ==
Chŏng Hyŏllyong was born in 1547 in Pongsan-myeon, Yesan County, to Chŏng Insu (정인수; 鄭仁壽) and a lady of the Hanyang Cho clan. He passed the military section of the special state examination held in the presence of the king (알성시; 謁聖試) in 1577 and was appointed as a military inspector (선전관; 宣傳官) in 1580.

In 1589, when the Border Defense Council (Pibyŏnsa) began appointing military officers without regular examination procedures, he was recommended by Sin Rip and subsequently recruited into official service. As a result, Chŏng Hyŏllyong served as Magistrate of Kyŏnghŭng before being appointed Magistrate of Chongsŏng in 1590.

== Imjin War ==
At the outbreak of the Imjin War, Chŏng Hyŏllyong was serving as magistrate of Chongsŏng. Following the advance of Katō Kiyomasa's Second Division into Hamgyŏng Province, many local officials fled their posts. On the 18th day, 7th month of 1592, as Han Kŭkham's forces were defeated by Japanese forces at Haejŏngch'ang and the subsequent Japanese advance into Northern Hamgyŏng Province, Chŏng Hyŏllyong likewise sought to surrender and submitted a formal letter of capitulation to the Japanese. In this letter, he wrote: "If one loves me, he is my king; if one mistreats me, he is my enemy. Whomever I serve, I remain a subject; whomever I obey, he is my sovereign."

After escaping from Chongsŏng, Chŏng Hyŏllyong joined Chŏng Munbu upon learning of the formation of the righteous army. Although Chŏng Munbu initially proposed that Chŏng Hyŏllyong, his senior in rank, take command of the righteous army, Chŏng Hyŏllyong declined the offer, expressing that he was unqualified to bear such a significant burden. In contrast, the majority of the militia members maintained that Chŏng Munbu, who had already earned widespread trust and respect among the local population, was the most appropriate choice for leadership. Acknowledging both the will of the people and the urgent necessity for unified command, Chŏng Munbu ultimately accepted the role and assumed leadership of the righteous forces and appointed Chŏng Hyŏllyong as a Central Division Commander (중위장; 中衛將).

=== Pukkwan campaign ===
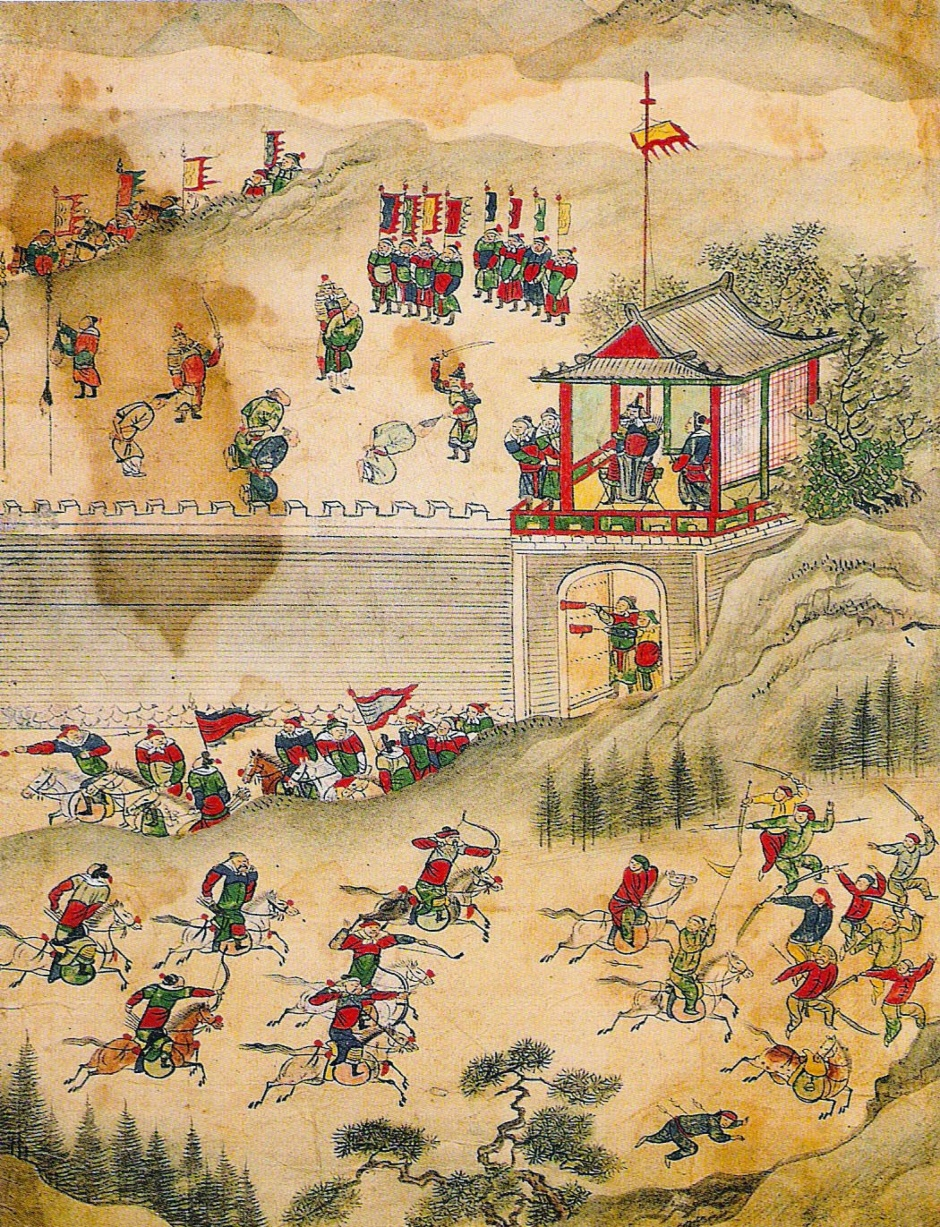
The painting Ch'angŭit'owaedo (창의토왜도; 倡義討倭圖) depicts a battle against Japanese forces and executions of collaborators.

Together with Chŏng Munbu, Chŏng Hyŏllyong entered Kyŏngsŏng on the 16th day, 9th month of 1592, which had been held by Kuk Sep'il, a rebel who had seized control of the region. After executing key rebel leaders—Kuk Kyŏngin in Hoeryŏng and Chŏng Malsu (정말수; 鄭末守) in Myŏngch'ŏn—they put Kuk Sep'il to death.

After recapturing Kyŏngsŏng, Chŏng Hyŏllyong opposed Chŏng Munbu's plan to advance the army against the Japanese forces, arguing that they should first secure the defense of Kyŏngsŏng and proceed cautiously when an opportunity presented itself. Chŏng Munbu rejected this view, asserting that such a course of action was contrary to the very purpose of the righteous army. Most of the militiamen sided with Chŏng Munbu, and on the 21st day, 10th month of 1593, the army entered Myŏngch'ŏn.

In preparation for an assault on Kilju Fortress, which was occupied by over 1,000 Japanese troops, Chŏng Munbu divided his forces into three units. Chŏng Hyŏllyong, appointed as the commander of the central division, led approximately 1,000 men and remained stationed in Myŏngch'ŏn. While stationed in Myŏngch'ŏn, he selected 400 elite soldiers and divided them into two units, advancing toward the Koch'am (고참; 古驂), where they encamped and deployed troops in ambush at strategic points. On the 30th day, 10th month of 1592, the righteous army won a significant victory over the Japanese at mountain Changdŏksan (장덕산; 長德山) in Jangp'yŏng (장평; 長坪), yet capturing Kilju Fortress proved to be a formidable challenge.

Chŏng Hyŏllyong, alongside Yu Kyŏngch'ŏn (유경천; 柳擎天) (commander of the left division) and O Ŭngt'ae (오응태; 吳應台) (commander of the right division), sought to isolate the fortress by first seizing control of the surrounding area. On 19th day, 11th month of 1592, during a Japanese raid in Immyŏng (임명; 臨溟), the three commanders launched a joint counterattack and secured a victory.

On 21st day, 11th month of 1592, following prolonged conflict with Yun T'agyŏn, the Provincial Patrol Commissioner (순찰사; 巡察使) of Hamgyŏng, Chŏng Munbu was compelled to resign from command. Leadership of the righteous army subsequently passed to Chŏng Hyŏllyong, who came to take charge of approximately 6,000 troops. However, many soldiers—who had fought under Chŏng Munbu's leadership—expressed dissatisfaction and gradually dispersed. Unable to maintain cohesion, Chŏng Hyŏllyong relinquished command within a month, transferring authority to O Ŭngt'ae. O Ŭngt'ae likewise struggled to stabilize the disarray, and on the 13th day, 1st month of 1593, Chŏng Munbu was reinstated as commander of the righteous army.

In the Battle of Paekt'apgyo (백탑교; 白塔郊) Chŏng fought against Katō Kiyomasa's forces who had advanced to relieve the besieged Japanese troops in Kilju Fortress. Due to intense combat, both sides sustained heavy casualties, and the Joseon forces temporarily retreated to Myŏngch'ŏn. However, under the cover of night, Katō successfully linked up with the garrison at Kilju and withdrew southward to Anbyŏn. Despite this, the Battle of Paekt'apgyo marked the final engagement that drove Japanese forces out of Hamgyŏng Province. In recognition of his contributions, Chŏng Hyŏllyong was appointed as the Provincial Military Commander (Pyŏngma Chŏltosa) of Northern Hamgyŏng.

== Conflicts with Jurchens ==
Amid the turmoil of the Imjin War, the Jurchens tribal forces (번호; 藩胡) sought to exploit Joseon's instability to stage rebellions. One such threat emerged from the village of Yŏksu (역수; 易水), situated near the border in Chongsŏn. Following the lead of a figure known as Iradae (이라대; 伊羅大), Yŏksu launched raids against Chongsŏn and Onsŏng. Yŏksu's village was a geographically fortified settlement, located atop a high ridge flanked on three sides by sheer cliffs. The villagers had constructed a stone fortress there, making it extremely difficult to capture.

=== Siege of Yŏksu village ===
In the 10th month of 1594, Chŏng Hyŏllyong initiated an assault on Yŏksu. He secretly gathered 1,325 soldiers from the Six Garrisons (Yukchin) along with 25 surrendered Japanese (hangwae) in Chongsŏn and surrounded the village. The villagers retreated into the fortress and prepared for battle. Chŏng deployed the 25 Japaneses as the vanguard and ordered his force to set fires and dig tunnels to undermine the stronghold. However, the Yŏksu's force resisted fiercely, launching arrows and hurling stones from their elevated position, forcing Chŏng's forces to temporarily withdraw.

Emboldened by their defense, the Yŏksu villagers mocked the Joseon troops by beating drums and singing songs. In response, Chŏng reorganized his ranks, enforced discipline by executing insubordinate soldiers, and launched a renewed assault. The overconfidence of the defenders following their initial success proved costly; during the second assault, many were driven back and fell from the cliffs. Ultimately, Chŏng Hyŏllyong achieved a complete victory in the suppression of Yŏksu. His forces suffered no casualties, while 266 enemies were slain.

=== Death ===
Chŏng Hyŏllyong reported his intention to subjugate the Jurchen tribes in Chongsŏn, Kyŏngwŏn, and Kyŏnghŭng who had refused to submit to Joseon authority in early 1595, between the 1st and 2nd month. However, the Border Defense Council opposed the proposal, arguing that the Jurchen should now be pacified through benevolent diplomacy rather than military action.

While Chŏng continued preparations for potential conflict with the Jurchen, he suffered a paralytic stroke and was subsequently dismissed from office. In response, King Seonjo dispatched court physicians and medicinal supplies to tend to his condition. Nevertheless, Chŏng remained speechless and immobilized for the next five years and died in 1600.
