= Pukkwan campaign =

1592–1593 Korea–Japan battle

- Part of the Imjin War
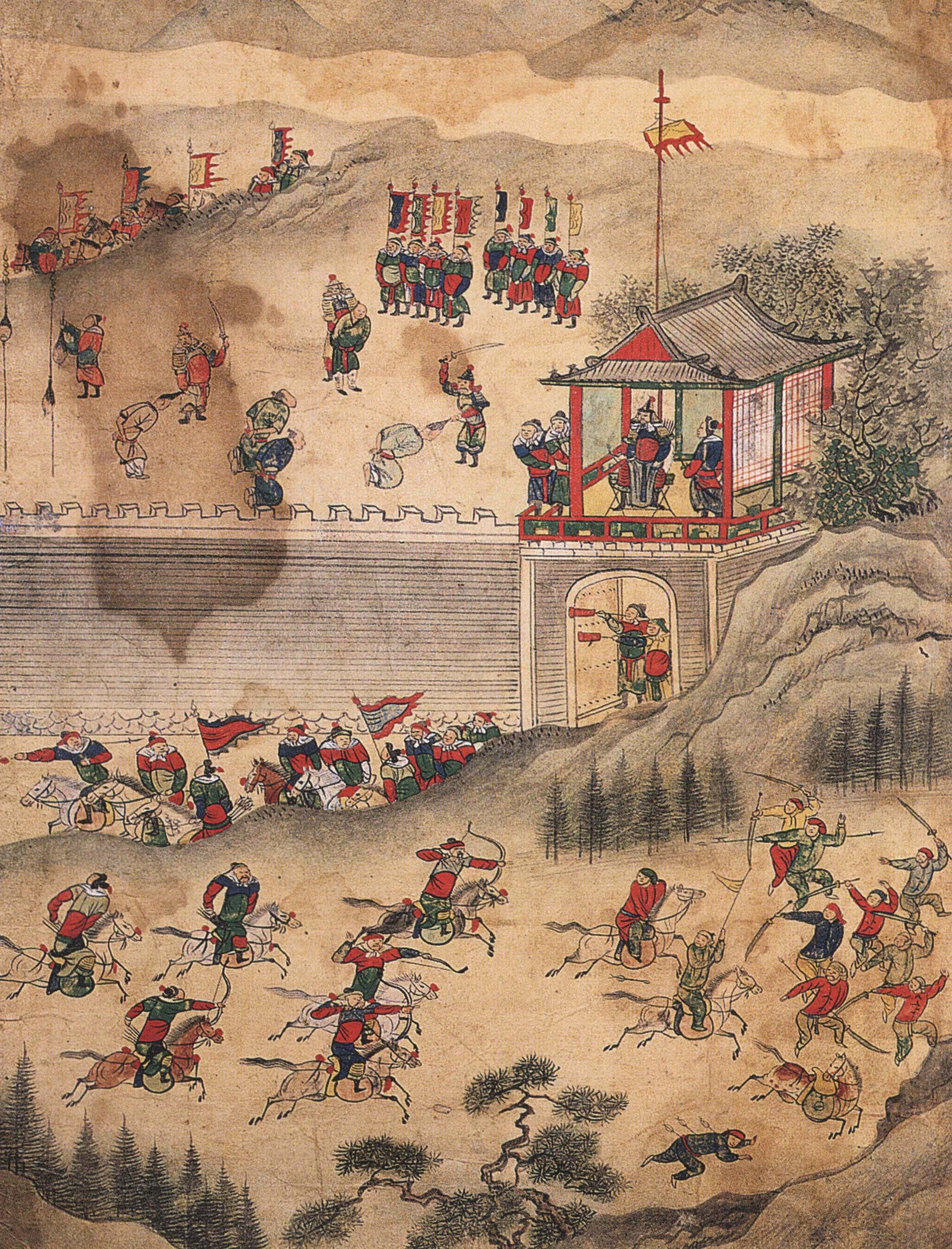
- Changuitowaedo describing Pukkwan campaign
Date	16th day, 9th month of 1592 – 28th day, 1st month of 1593
Location	Hamgyong Province, Joseon
Result	Joseon victory

Belligerents
Joseon	Japan; Pro-Japanese rebel forces of Hamgyong

Commanders and leaders
Chŏng Munbu; Chŏng Hyŏllyong	Katō Kiyomasa; Nabeshima Naoshige; Kuk Kyŏngin †; Kuk Sep'il †; Chŏng Malsu †

Strength
5,000	22,000

Casualties and losses
Unknown	8,864

- Korean name
- Hangul: 북관대첩
- Hanja: 北關大捷
- RR: Bukgwan daecheop
- MR: Pukkwan taech'ŏp

The Pukkwan campaign (Korean: 북관대첩; Hanja: 北關大捷) was a series of military engagement between Joseon and Japanese forces in Hamgyong Province from the 16th day, 9th month of 1592 to 28th day, 1st month of 1593. During this campaign, the "Righteous army," a civilian militia led by Chŏng Munbu, executed local collaborators and successfully repelled the Japanese invasion.

== Background ==
=== Japanese invasion of Hamgyong Province ===
In the wake of the Japanese capture of Hanyang on 3rd day, 5th month of 1592, the invasion of Korea intensified under the strategic leadership of Konishi Yukinaga and Katō Kiyomasa. While Konishi advanced into Pyongan Province, Katō spearheaded operations in the northeastern region, swiftly penetrating Hamgyong Province.

=== Rebellion in Hamgyong ===
At the time, residents of Hamgyong faced systemic discrimination by the central Joseon government, leading to widespread resentment. The discontent intensified when Prince Imhae and Sunhwa, dispatched to recruit royal soldiers, engaged in looting and exploitation of local resources such as clothes, foods, and other necessities. The civilians in Hamgyeong at times surrendered to the Japanese and either killed or captured officials of the Joseon government, subsequently handing them over to the Japanese army.

When Katō's forces advanced to Hoeryong, Kuk Kyŏngin, based in Hoeryeong, initiated a revolt and defected to the Japanese side, along with Chŏng Malsu of Myongchon and Kuk Sep'il of Kyongsong. On 23rd day, 7th month of 1592, Kuk Kyŏngin handed over to Katō's forces the two royal princes who had sought refuge in Hoeryong, along with their servants and family members. In return, Katō granted Kuk Kyŏngin the authority to govern Hoeryong and conferred control over Kyongsong upon Kuk Sep'il. Following these appointments, Katō withdrew his main force and established a military presence in Anbyon.

Seeking to consolidate direct control over the region southern corridor of Kilju, Katō stationed eight commanders—among them Katō Umanojō and Katō Seibei—in Kilju. He further deployed troops across critical locations along the route from Kilju to Anbyon, thereby reinforcing Japanese strategic dominance in the region.

=== Chŏng Munbu raised the righteous army ===
Civil unrest intensified as Japanese forces expanded their exploitation of local residents and abuse of official authority. Recognizing the shifting tide of public sentiment, local figures Yi Pungsu, Chi Tarwŏn, Ch'oe Paech'ŏn, and Kang Munu resolved to form a Righteous Army. They extended an invitation to Chŏng Munbu, who had been in hiding, urging him to assume command of the army. Chŏng accepted their request and proceeded to organize a militia. In response, several hundred local soldiers and strongmen rallied to his cause.

== Battles ==
=== Battle of Kyŏngsŏng ===
On 16th day, 9th month of 1592, the righteous army led by Chŏng Munbu successfully captured and secured Kyongsong, where Kuk Sep'il had been stationed. Following the occupation, Chŏng issued a proclamation urging the populace to join the resistance. In response, individuals such as Chŏng Hyŏllyong, O Ŭngt'ae, and numerous other soldiers enlisted in the growing force. Alarmed by the fall of Kyŏngsŏng, Katō Umanojō dispatched a detachment of 100 scouts to assess the situation. However, the reconnaissance unit was promptly repelled by Kang Munu and his cavalry.

=== The Execution of Collaborators ===
Prior to the planned recapture of Kilju, Chŏng Munbu, responding to the requests of his subordinates, resolved to execute collaborators who had defected to the Japanese. He issued a public notice announcing the formation of the Righteous Army and declaring the intent to punish key rebels, including Kuk Kyŏngin and Chŏng Malsu.

In Hoeryŏng, during 10th month of 1592, a Confucian student, O Yunjŏk, upon reading Chŏng Munbu's proclamation, devised a plot to assassinate Kuk Kyŏngin. Anticipating the attempt, Kuk had O apprehended by his subordinates under cover of night. Although Kuk planned to execute O the following day, another Confucian student, Sin Sejun, mobilized a group of armed men, surrounded Kuk's residence, set it ablaze, and killed him in the ensuing attack.

Meanwhile, in Myŏngch'ŏn, local peasants rose in revolt against Chŏng Malsu, though their uprising was suppressed by rebel forces. In response, Chŏng Munbu dispatched Ku Hwang and Kang Munu to the region. They crushed the rebels and killed Chŏng Malsu. Subsequently, upon retaking Kyongsong, Munbu ordered the execution of Kuk Sep'il and the remaining collaborators. With these actions, the rebellion in Hamgyong Province was decisively quelled.

=== Battle of Kilju ===
==== Battle of Changp'yŏng ====
Chŏng Munbu organized his forces into three divisions—the central corps, the left wing, and the right wing—placing them under the respective command of Chŏng Hyŏllyong, Han Inje, and Yu Kyŏngch'ŏn. In addition, he deployed smaller ambush units under O Ŭngt'ae and Wŏn Ch'ungsŏ, strategically positioning them in concealed locations to carry out surprise attacks.

On 30th day, 10th month of 1592, Wŏn Ch'ungsŏ ambushed a Japanese detachment returning from a raid on a town in Myŏngch'ŏn, where they had massacred the local population. The ambush forced the Japanese to retreat toward mountain Changdŏksan, located approximately two kilometers east of Kilju Fortress. The righteous army secured the summit before the Japanese could reach it and launched a concentrated offensive. The Japanese forces withdrew into a nearby valley, only to be surrounded from all sides. That night, heavy snowfall began, and the Japanese troops, unable to withstand the freezing conditions, became militarily incapacitated.

==== Siege of Kilju Fortress ====
The Japanese forces in Kilju sealed the fortress and reinforced their defensive positions. Joseon troops encircled the stronghold, cutting off access to firewood and other essential supplies. In 11th month of 1592, Chŏng Hyŏllyong, Yu Kyŏngch'ŏn, and O Ŭngt'ae, led an estimated 3,000 troops in a direct assault on the fortress. However, the siege failed to breach the Japanese defenses due to their determined resistance.

In response, Chŏng Munbu adopted a strategy of operational isolation, aiming to sever Japanese lines of communication by targeting Ch'aeksŏng—a key junction connecting Tanchon and Kilju. During this maneuver, Joseon forces encountered a Japanese unit engaged in looting a village in Immyong and engaged them in battle at Ssangp'o. The engagement culminated in a Joseon victory on 19th day, 11th month of 1592.

=== Battle of Tanch'ŏn ===
In Tanch'ŏn, a force of 900 soldiers under the command of Katō Yozaemon was stationed. Kang Ch'an, the magistrate of Tanch'ŏn, sought military assistance from Chŏng Munbu. In response, on 22nd day, 1st month of 1593, Chŏng dispatched approximately 200 troops under the command of four officers, including Ku Hwang, and positioned them in ambush at Mach'ŏllyŏng. To initiate the engagement, around 20 government troops staged a feigned retreat, successfully luring the Japanese forces into the ambush site. The ensuing surprise attack resulted in the deaths of approximately 170 Japanese soldiers, while the Joseon forces sustained no casualties.

=== Battle of Paekt'apkyo ===
As the tide of war began to shift—with the arrival of Ming reinforcements and the defeat of Konishi's forces at the Siege of Pyongyang—Katō Kiyomasa sought to avoid isolation in Hamgyong Province by retreating toward Hanyang. However, in an effort to relieve the Japanese garrison besieged in Kilju by the righteous army, he mobilized over 20,000 troops and marched toward Kilju.

In response, Chŏng Munbu withdrew his forces from Tanchon after Katō crossed Mach'ŏllyŏng. On 28th day, 1st month of 1593, Joseon forces intercepted Katō's army north of Immyong at Paekt'apkyo, inflicting significant casualties. However, the Joseon forces also suffered considerable losses and subsequently withdrew to Myŏngch'ŏn to regroup and reorganize. That night, Katō reached the encircled Japanese detachment and immediately retreated with them to Anbyon.

== Aftermath ==
After rescuing the isolated units, Katō Kiyomasa regrouped his forces in Hamhung on 20 February and then retreated to Anbyon. By 29th day, 2nd month of 1593, he arrived in Hanyang, where it was confirmed that his army had suffered 8,864 casualties out of a total of 22,000 troops. Following this realization, Katō initiated a full withdrawal.

In the aftermath of the Japanese retreat, the Righteous Army was disbanded, and command was transferred to Yun T'agyŏn. Tensions soon arose between Chŏng Munbu and Yun, as the latter was perceived to have claimed disproportionate credit for the campaign's success. As a result, Chŏng Munbu's role was officially recognized only for his actions in executing rebel collaborators, rather than for his military leadership in the broader conflict.

== See also ==
- Pukkwan Victory Monument

== Bibliography ==
- 안국승 (1999), 임란 의병장 충의공 정문부 (PDF), 의정부문화원
- Hawley, Samuel (2005), The Imjin War, The Royal Asiatic Society, Korea Branch/UC Berkeley Press, ISBN 89-954424-2-5
