= Chijegyo =

Joseon government position

Chijegyo (Korean: 지제교; Hanja: 知製敎; RR: jijegyo) was the title of a government position during Korea's Joseon period. Chijegyo worked to execute edicts of the king.

== History ==
The position was created during the Goryeo period, under the name Chijego (지제고; 知制誥; jijego). Goryeo's successor Joseon had two subdivisions of the position: Inner Chijegyo were officers of the Sŭngjŏngwŏn and Outer Chijegyo were ten elected subjects of the Saganwŏn.

Sejong the Great later permitted bachelors of Jiphyeonjeon to take hold of outer jijegyo altogether with their original duty, whereas in 1430, he again transformed the guideline, which allowed bachelors to be inner jijegyo, with personnel of outer jijegyo being elected as the same way as before.

Since Jinhyeojeon had gone through innovative doctrine with establishment of Hongmungwan, the personnel of Hongmungwan came to hold 13 seats of chijegyo simultaneously, whereas another officers were elected in a separate division. By late 18th century, the meaning of "Inner Chijegyo" became shifted, in that the term indicated the case that one holds not only a position of Hongmungwan but also takes Chijegyo, concurrently.

== See also ==
- Chŏng Tojŏn
- Politics of Joseon
