= Top'yŏng ŭisasa =

Government office of Goryeo

The Top'yŏng ŭisasa (Korean: 도평의사사도평의사사) was a government office in late Goryeo, renamed from the Tobyŏngmasa (도병마사) during the reign of King Chungnyeol, serving as the central body in charge of state affairs.

It was also called Todang (도당) and remained in place until the early Joseon period.

== Overview ==
In 1279, the Tobyŏngmasa (도병마사) was renamed. In early Goryeo, the Tobyŏngmasa had been nothing more than a temporary council dealing exclusively with national defense and military matters. However, after the end of military rule, the Tobyŏngmasa was reorganised into the Topyŏng ŭisasa, expanding and strengthening both its membership and functions.

In addition to the Chaebu (재부, Chŏmŭibu) and Miljik (밀직), the regular members of the Three Offices (三司) also sat as Chaech’u (재추) in the Dodang, that is, the Topyŏng ŭisasa. Including those who participated in deliberations (상의), by the late Goryeo period the number of members expanded to seventy or eighty.

Its functions developed from being solely a deliberative council into an administrative body that directly oversaw state affairs. It was transformed from a temporary institution into a permanent one. Royal edicts (왕지), the various central offices (제사), and the local governors of the provinces (Anryŏmsa, 按廉使) were all brought under the Dodang’s authority, making it the highest central political institution.

The Topyŏng ŭisasa continued unchanged after the founding of the Joseon dynasty. Upon ascending the throne, Yi Sŏnggye made the Topyŏng ŭisasa the highest state organ and reorganised it. In 1400, it was renamed the Ŭijŏngbu (의정부), and in 1401 it merged with the Munhabu (문하부) to take charge of all state affairs, thus transforming Goryeo’s Topyŏng ŭisasa into Joseon’s Ŭijŏngbu.
