= Pukkwan Victory Monument =

16th century monument now in North Korea

Coordinates: 40°45′32.2″N 129°16′4.6″E

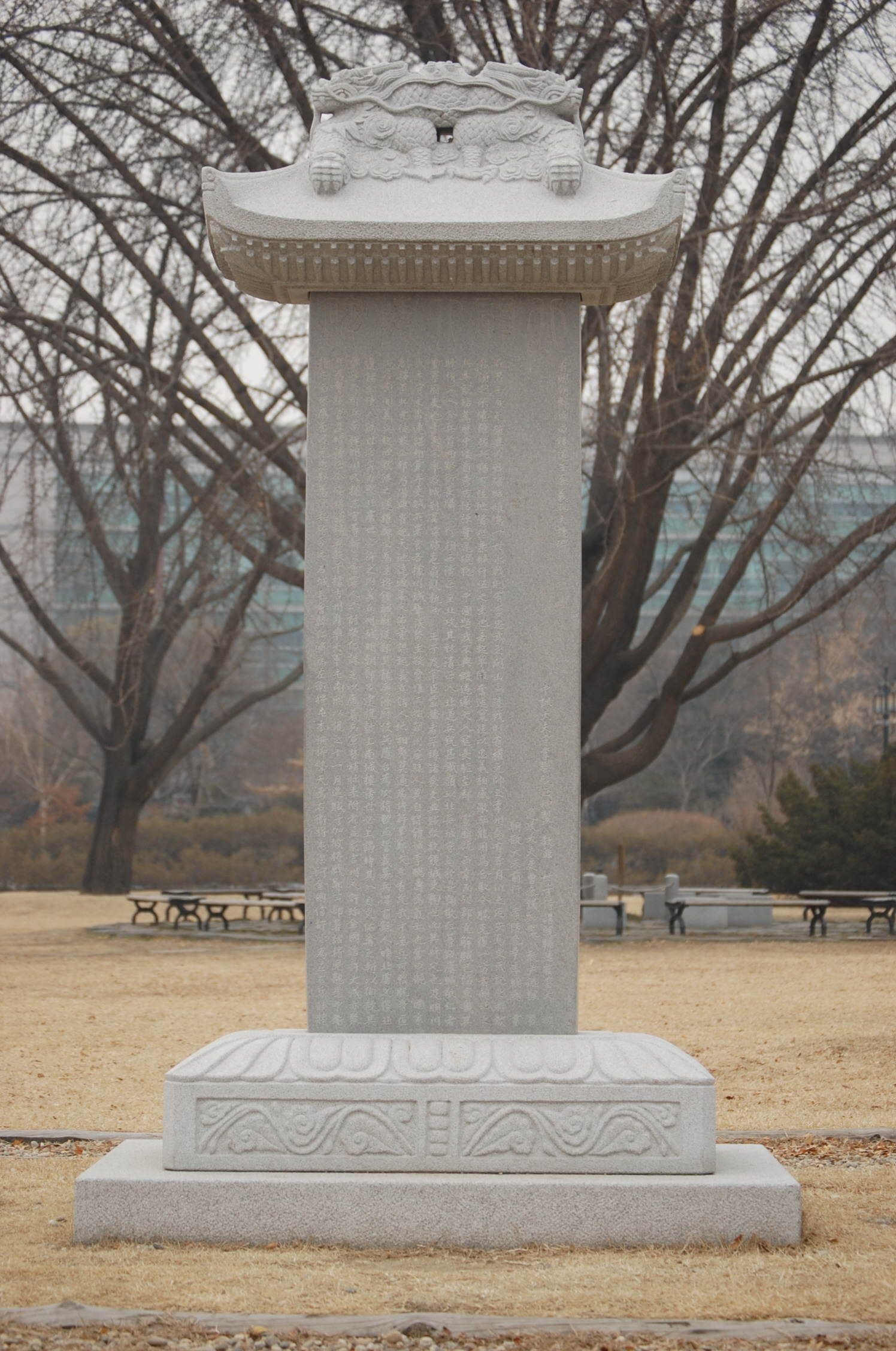
- Replica in Gyeongbokgung

Korean name
- Chosŏn'gŭl: 북관대첩비 (유명조선국함경도임진의병대첩비)
- Hancha: 北關大捷碑 (有明朝鮮國咸鏡道壬辰義兵大捷碑)
- Revised Romanization: Bukgwan Daecheopbi (Yumyeong Joseonguk Hamgyeongdo Imjin Uibyeong Daecheopbi)
- McCune–Reischauer: Pukkwan Taech'ŏppi (Yumyŏng Chosŏnguk Hamgyŏngdo Imjin Ŭibyŏng Taech'ŏppi)

The Pukkwan Victory Monument (Pukkwan Taech'ŏppi, full name Yumyŏng Chosŏnguk Hamgyŏngdo Imjin Ŭibyŏng Taech'ŏppi, the "Ming-Joseon Hamgyongdo Imjin righteous army victory monument") is a stone stele written in Korean Hanmun commemorating a series of Korean military victories between 1592 and 1594 against the invading army of Japan during the Imjin War. First erected in 1707 in Kilju in what is now North Korea, it was subsequently taken to Japan during the Japanese occupation of Korea during the Russo-Japanese War of 1905. It was eventually discovered on the grounds of Yasukuni Shrine in Tokyo, prompting a Korean outcry that it be returned. In a ceremony on 12 October 2005, it was turned over to officials from South Korea, who returned it to its original location, which is now in North Korea.

== Creation ==
The Seven-Year War resulted from two Japanese invasions, in 1592 and 1597. The Koreans and their Chinese allies drove back the invasion but the bitter war was a disaster for the country. During the initial invasion, Korean general Chŏng Munbu formed a volunteer army that won eight victories between 1592 and 1594 against an army of 20,000 Japanese led by General Katō Kiyomasa in the Hamgwallyong Pass area of Hamgyong Province, during Kato's Hamgyong campaign.

In 1707, King Sukjong ordered the creation of a monument commemorating the victories. The 187 cm tall and 66 cm wide stela has 1500 characters detailing the actions of the volunteer army. It was erected in Kilju county, North Hamgyong Province, where it stood for the next two hundred years.

== Removal to Japan ==
During the Russo-Japanese War of 1905, much of the Korean Peninsula was under the occupation of the Imperial Japanese Army. The monument, located at Immyong Station, came to the attention of Major General Ikeda who was stationed in the area. Apparently displeased by it, he allowed Lieutenant General Miyoshi to take the monument home to Japan. It was placed in a Japanese imperial museum before being moved into the woods in the grounds of Yasukuni Shrine, a Shinto shrine honoring Japan's war dead. There it stood in obscurity for three-quarters of a century, forgotten by both the Japanese and Koreans.

In 1969, Choe Myo-myeon, the director of the International Institute of Korean Studies in Tokyo came across the monument. In the meantime, Yasukuni Shrine had become a focus of controversy after several Class A war criminals of the Second World War had been honored there. Many Koreans were outraged to learn that a Korean victory monument over a Japanese invasion now stood on the grounds of a Japanese shrine seen as commemorating the militarism that had caused immense suffering in Korea.

== Negotiations ==
Despite requests by the South Korean government and civic groups that the monument be returned, Japan refused, stating that doing so violated their principle of "separation of religion and politics" and that as the monument originally stood in what was now North Korea, South Korea was not in a position to negotiate its return.

The deadlock was finally broken in December 2004, when Buddhist monks from North and South Korea agreed to work together to retrieve the monument. South Korean Prime Minister Lee Hae Chan and North Korean president of the Supreme People's Assembly Presidium Kim Yong Nam discussed the issue at a meeting in Jakarta, Indonesia in April 2005. This led to further talks at the 15th inter-Korean Cabinet-level meeting in Seoul. These talks marked the monument as a major issue of inter-Korean cooperation, removed the Japanese objection about the confusion caused by a divided Korea, and led to their agreement to return the monument.

On 12 October 2005, a brief ceremony attended by priests of the shrine, representatives of the Japanese Ministry of Foreign Affairs and officials from the embassy of South Korea was held at the monument to turn over control. South Korea briefly put the monument on display at Gyeongbok Palace in Seoul. On 28 February 2006, a ceremony was held before the tomb of General Chŏng Munbu in Gyeonggi Province before its return north. On 23 March 2006, North Korea's Central News Agency reported that a ceremony had been held to restore the monument to Kimchaek in North Hamgyong Province and that it had been designated National Treasure No. 193.

== See also ==
- Battle of Bukgwan
