= Seungjeongwon ilgi =

Joseon-era Korean historical records

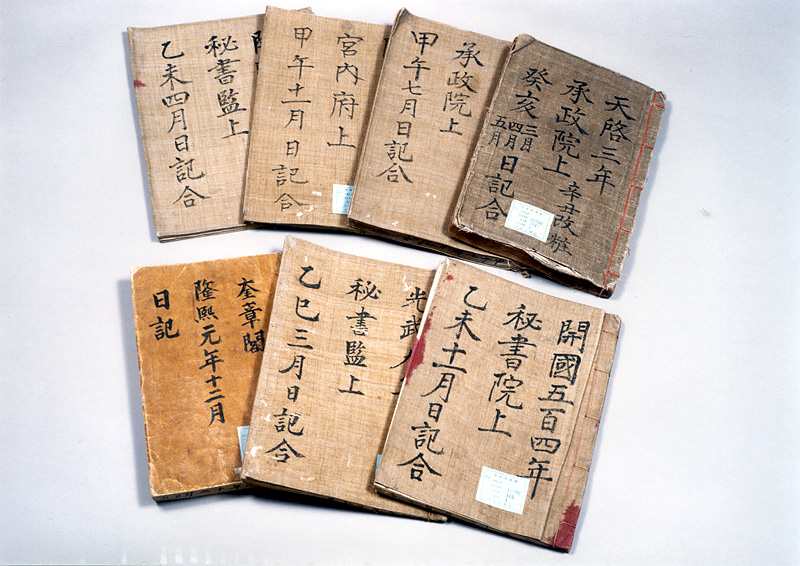
- Author: Seungjeongwon
- Language: Middle Korean, Early Modern Korean
- Publication place: Joseon
- Website: https://sjw.history.go.kr/main.do

Seungjeongwon ilgi (Korean: 승정원일기; Hanja: 承政院日記) or the Diaries of the Royal Secretariat are records created by the Seungjeongwon, one of the central political institutions during the Joseon period. They primarily document interactions between the king and various government departments. They were continuously written from the founding of Joseon until its fall. Today, the texts are managed by the Seoul National University Kyujanggak Institute for Korean Studies. They were written in Classical Chinese.

The records are considered to be valuable historical sources, as they are detailed, extensive, and offer insights into the contemporary international affairs of East Asia. Alongside the Veritable Records of the Joseon Dynasty, they are considered to be among Korea's most important cultural assets. Currently, the records hold the designation of National Treasure No. 303 of Korea and were inscribed on UNESCO's Memory of the World Register in 2001.

== Compilation process ==
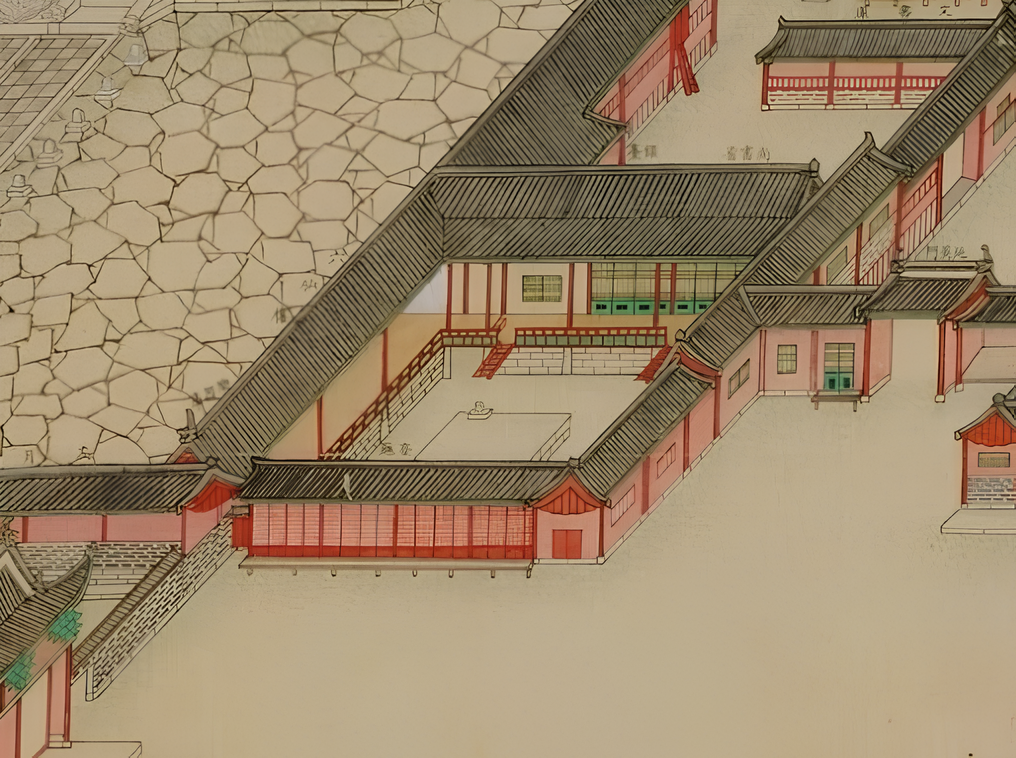
The appearance of the Royal Secretariat where the Seungjeongwon ilgi were compiled.

The Seungjeongwon ilgi was compiled by the Seungjeongwon (Royal Secretariat), one of Joseon's central political institutions. It consisted of six seungji (senior secretaries), two juseo (junior secretaries), as well as 28 clerks. Although they were the core members of the institution, the actual compilation of the records was primarily handled by them.

They, who were in charge of record-keeping, transcribed every aspect of the king's discussions with his officials regarding state affairs. Since all records were written by hand with a brush, this required quick transcription from the secretaries.

Their work was divided into two shifts, each shift involving one person writing half of the record while the other completed the remaining half. However, as the workload increased, a single individual often had to write the entire record, sometimes leading to occasional inaccuracies. In such cases, they referred to records from other scribes to ensure accuracy.

Documents submitted to the king, such as petitions or reports, were not directly recorded by them but were instead transcribed by the clerks and recorded in the records.

== Value as a historical source ==
Only parts of the Seungjeongwon ilgi that document the later part of the Joseon period now survive. Earlier records were destroyed by fires during the Imjin War. The surviving records cover 271 years, from the reign of King Injo in 1623 to that of King Gojong in 1894 (or 287 years if the Korean Empire period, which lasted until 1910, is included).

While the Veritable Records of the Joseon Dynasty comprise 888 volumes with approximately 49,646,667 characters, they span 3,243 volumes and contain 242,500,000 characters.

In addition, the records serve as an official government document and a primary historical source that records state affairs between the kings and their officials during the Joseon period. By documenting all aspects of governance, they also provide invaluable insights into the international dynamics of East Asia at the time, including relations with China and Japan.

For these reasons, they have been designated as National Treasure No. 303 of South Korea and were inscribed on the UNESCO Memory of the World Register in 2001.

== Translation ==
The Seungjeongwon ilgi was written in Middle and Early Modern Korean, making its language somewhat distant from Modern Korean. Therefore, efforts have been made to translate these records into Modern Korean. The Institute for the Translation of Korean Classics began its translation work in 1994.

However, unlike the Veritable Records of the Joseon Dynasty, which have been fully translated, they have not yet been completely translated as of 2025. The reasons are as follows:

1. Volume
  The translation of the Veritable Records of the Joseon Dynasty began in the 1960s and was completed in 1993, taking about 30 years to finish. This collection, however, is approximately five times the volume of the Annals, as mentioned in the "Value as a historical source" section. The sheer volume of records has inevitably delayed the completion of the translation.
  According to the Institute for the Translation of Korean Classics, 37.4% of it had been translated as of the end of 2023.
2. Cursive script
  As described in the "Compilation process" section, the dialogues between the king and his officials were quickly transcribed. This often led to the use of cursive script, where Chinese characters were written in a more fluid, abbreviated style. Understanding this style requires special training, which has posed significant challenges for translators.
  The process of converting it into Traditional Chinese characters has been completed through digitization. However, since this only involved correcting it, more time is needed to complete the translation into Modern Korean.

For these reasons, the complete translation of it into Modern Korean is not expected to be finished until 2062. As previously mentioned, the approximately 200 years of records lost to fire during the Imjin War are excluded.

In June 2017, efforts to translate these records using artificial intelligence began. SYSTRAN developed an AI translation algorithm and stated that "the understanding of contextual nuances and accuracy has reached up to 70% of professional translators' performance." This advancement is expected to accelerate the estimated completion date, originally set for 2062, by over 30 years.

The digitization process started in 2001 and was completed in 2015, with the National Institute of Korean History finalizing the original text database. According to an exclusive report by Yonhap News Agency, approximately 130 to 140 experts, including scholars of classical Chinese and historians, were involved annually in the digitization project. This effort is considered unprecedented in South Korea for digitizing such a vast collection of historical records.

Records from the reigns of King Injo, King Gojong, and Emperor Sunjong have all been translated, and the records from King Yeongjo's reign are currently being translated. The translated versions can be accessed through the Korean Classics Comprehensive Database. English is not supported.

== See also ==
- Seungjeongwon
- Veritable Records of the Joseon Dynasty
- Uigwe
- History of Korea
- Joseon Dynasty politics
