= State Council of Joseon =

Highest organ of the Joseon government

- Hangul: 의정부
- Hanja: 議政府
- RR: Uijeongbu
- MR: Ŭijŏngbu

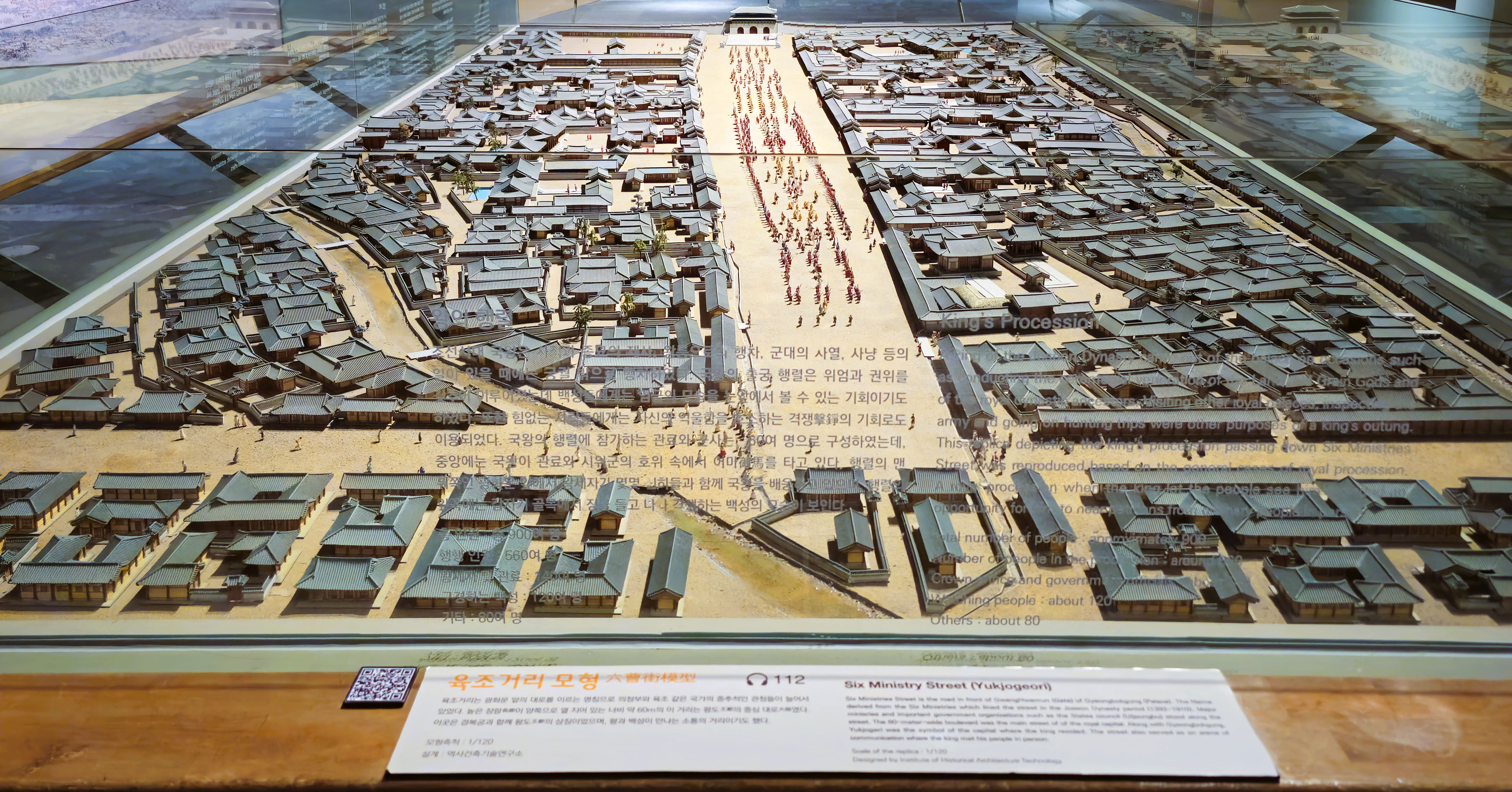
Model of the Six Ministry Street

The State Council of Joseon or Uijeongbu was the highest organ of government during the Joseon state of dynastic Korea. It was led by three officials known as the state councilors. The councilors were entrusted to deliberate over key problems of state, advising the king, and conveying royal decisions to the Six Ministries.

The council was formed under the reign of Jeongjong, just before Taejong seized power in 1400. It replaced an earlier institution called the Privy Council, which had been dominated by Chŏng Tojŏn and other key figures behind the dynasty's founding. The State Council gradually declined in importance over the 500 years of Joseon rule. Finally, the council was replaced by the cabinet in 1907, forced by Japanese intervention.

The modern-day city of Uijeongbu, in Gyeonggi Province, South Korea, was named after this Joseon organ of state.

== Structure ==
The State Council comprised:

Rank	Post	Quota	Note
Senior 1st	Chief State Councilor	1	Korean: 영의정; Hanja: 領議政
Senior 1st	Left State Councilor	1	Korean: 좌의정; Hanja: 左議政
Senior 1st	Right State Councilors	1	Korean: 우의정; Hanja: 右議政
Junior 1st	Left Associate State Councilor	1	Korean: 좌찬성; Hanja: 左贊成
Junior 1st	Right Associate State Councilor	1	Korean: 우찬성; Hanja: 右贊成
Senior 2nd	Left Assistant State Councilor	1	Korean: 좌참찬; Hanja: 左參贊
Senior 2nd	Right Assistant State Councilor	1	Korean: 우참찬; Hanja: 右參贊
Senior 4th	First Secretary	2	Korean: 사인; Hanja: 舍人
Senior 5th	Regulation Transcriber	1	Korean: 검상; Hanja: 檢詳
Senior 8th	Official Recorder	2	Korean: 사록; Hanja: 司錄

== Sources ==
- Lee, Ki-Baik (1984). A New History of Korea. Harvard University Press. ISBN 0-674-61575-1.
- Han, Jongwoo (2013). Power, Place, and State-Society Relations in Korea: Neo-Confucian and Geomantic Reconstruction of Developmental State and Democratization. Lexington Books. ISBN 978-0739175552.
- Hwang, Kyung Moon (2015). Rationalizing Korea: The Rise of the Modern State, 1894–1945. Univ of California Press. ISBN 978-0520963276.
- Chan, Robert (2017). Korea-China Relations in History and Contemporary Implications. Springer. ISBN 978-3319622651.
- EncyKor (2020a). "의금부" [Uijeongbu]. Encyclopedia of Korean Culture.

== See also ==
- Joseon Dynasty politics
- History of Korea

Government of Joseon

State Council	Six Ministries	Ministry of Personnel
Seungjeongwon	Ministry of Taxation
Central Offices	Uigeumbu	Ministry of Rites
Saheonbu	Ministry of Military Affairs
Royal Court	Saganwon	Three Offices	Ministry of Punishments
Hongmungwan	Ministry of Public Works
Hanseongbu
Districts (bu)
Regional Offices	Eight Provinces	Regions (mok)
Counties (gun)
Townships (hyeon)
