= Kilju County =

Coordinates: 40°57′43″N 129°20′12″E

Kilju County 길주군
- County

Korean transcription(s)
  - Hangul: 길주군
  - Hanja: 吉州郡
  - McCune-Reischauer: Kilju-gun
  - Revised Romanization: Gilju-gun
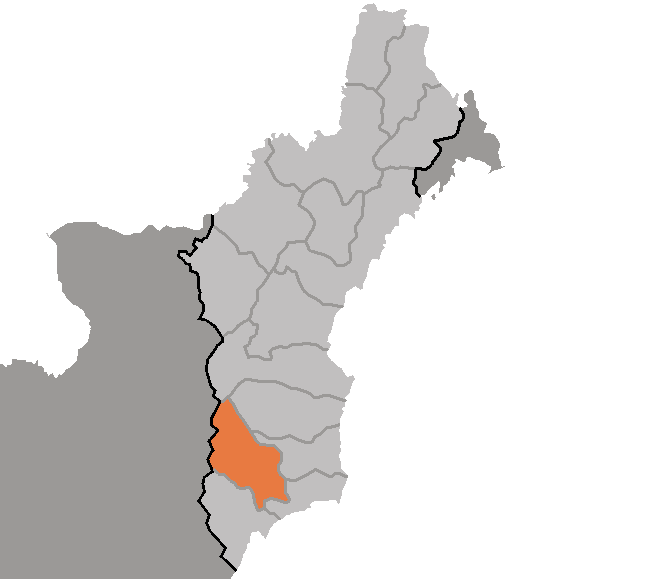
- Map of North Hamgyong showing the location of Kilju
- Country: North Korea
- Province: North Hamgyong Province
- Administrative divisions: 1 ŭp, 5 worker's districts, 22 ri

Area
  - Total: 1,033 km^{2} (399 sq mi)

Population (2008 census)
  - Total: 139,932
  - Density: 135.5/km^{2} (350.8/sq mi)

Kilju, sometimes romanized as Kilchu, is a county in North Hamgyong province, North Korea. The county seat is Kilju Town.

== History ==
The area around Kilju was part of the ancient Goguryeo kingdom and was long inhabited by various Jurchen tribes. In 1107 it was annexed by Goryeo, who gave it its current name (meaning "province of good fortune"). After the ascension of Joseon Dynasty, Kilju was promoted to county in 1398, and in 1509 the county was included in the newly formed Hamgyong Province. In 1895, during a reorganization of regional governments, Hamgyong was dissolved and replaced with several small departments; Kilju County was then annexed to the newly formed Kyongsong Department. In 1896 however, the new organization was abandoned, with the departments re-organized into North and South Hamgyong provinces; Kilju was then placed into North Hamgyong, where it remains to this day. During the Japanese occupation, the county was used for manufacturing telecommunications equipment and electric insulation.

== Geography ==
Kilju is located in the southern part of North Hamgyong. It borders Myŏngch'ŏn on the east, Kimch'aek and Hwadae to the south, Myŏnggan (Hwasŏng) and Ŏrang to the north. To the west it borders Tanch'ŏn in South Hamgyŏng and Paegam in Ryanggang.

Kilju stands at the junction of the Hamgyŏng Mountains and the Maryŏng Mountains, and its northwestern region is mountainous.

== Climate ==
The average annual temperature is 7.5 °C (-7.6 °C in January and 22.2 °C in August).

== Culture ==
Tourist sites in Kilju include the former Kilju Magistrate's Hall, built in 1888 to house the office, and the Kilju Hyanggyo, one of the provincial schools founded during the Yi dynasty to teach the children of the rural Yangban (scholar-aristocrats) who lived in the area.) The Pukkwan Victory Monument, located in this county before the 1950s redistricting, is now located just across the border in what is now Kimchaek city.

== Transportation ==
In addition to its airport, the county is served by the Pyongra Line railway, which stops at Kilju Chongnyon Station and connects it to Pyongyang and Rason. The city is also linked by road to Hamhung and Chongjin.

== Military and nuclear tests ==
A number of military facilities are known or believed to be located in Kilju. These include the Hwadae-ri atomic weapons training facility. This was first built with Soviet assistance in 1958, and rose to international prominence when the 2006 North Korean nuclear test, 2009 North Korean nuclear test, 2013 North Korean nuclear test, and 2017 North Korean nuclear test were reported to have been held at Punggye-ri Nuclear Test Site in the area of Mantapsan mountain, in the northernmost part of the county. The Musudan-ri missile facility is located in nearby Hwadae county, and a separate Scud facility has been reported in the area.

Reports from defectors who lived in the area indicate that residents are suffering from radiation exposure, with high rates of cancers and birth defects being experienced by those living near the Punggye-ri Test Site.

== Administrative divisions ==
The county is divided into one town (ŭp), five worker's districts (rodongjagu), and 22 villages (ri).

	Chosŏn'gŭl	Hancha
Kilju-ŭp	길주읍	吉州邑
Chunam-rodongjagu	주남로동자구	洲南勞動者區
Ilsin-lodongjagu	일신로동자구	日新勞動者區
Ryongdam-rodongjagu	룡담로동자구	龍潭勞動者區
Yŏngbung-rodongjagu	영북로동자구	營北勞動者區
Yŏngnam-rodongjagu	영남로동자구	營南勞動者區
Ch'ŏngam-ri	청암리	靑岩里
Ch'unhŭng-ri	춘흥리	春興里
Happ'o-ri	합포리	合浦里
Hongsu-ri	홍수리	紅繡里
Kŭmch'ŏl-li	금천리	錦川里
Kŭmsong-ri	금송리	金松里
Moksŏng-ri	목성리	木城里
Munam-ri	문암리	門岩里
Namyang-ri	남양리	南陽里
Onch'ŏl-li	온천리	溫泉里
Pongam-ri	봉암리	鳳岩里
P'unggye-ri	풍계리	豊溪里
P'yŏngryung-ri	평륙리	坪六里
Rimdong-ri	림동리	林洞里
Ryongsŏng-ri	룡성리	龍城里
Ryuch'ŏl-li	류천리	柳川里
Sangha-ri	상하리	上下里
Sindong-ri	신동리	新洞里
Sipil-li	십일리	十一里
Ssangryong-ri	쌍룡리	雙龍里
T'apyang-ri	탑양리	塔陽里
Tŏksil-li	덕신리	德新里

== See also ==
- Punggye-ri Nuclear Test Site
