= Orang County =

Ŏrang County 어랑군
- County

Korean transcription(s)
  - Chosŏn'gŭl: 어랑군
  - Hancha: 漁郞郡
  - McCune-Reischauer: Ŏrang kun
  - Revised Romanization: Eorang-gun
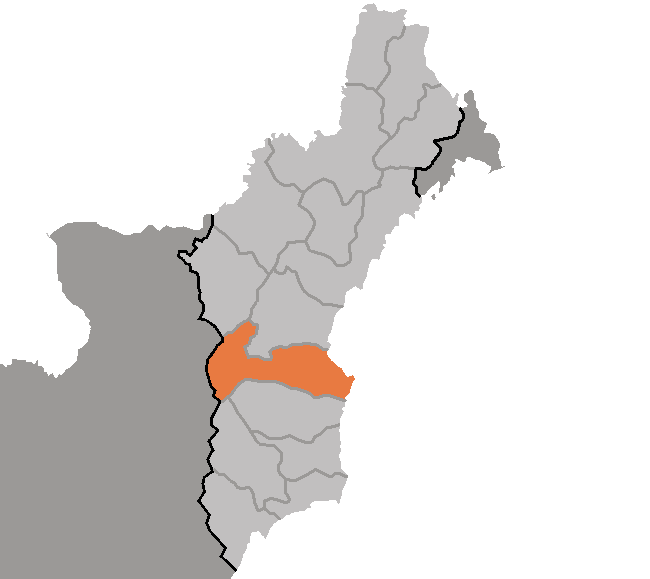
- Map of North Hamgyong showing the location of Orang
- Country: North Korea
- Province: North Hamgyong Province
- Administrative divisions: 1 ŭp;, 1 workers' district, 20 ri

Area
  - Total: 1,300 km^{2} (500 sq mi)

Population (2008 census)
  - Total: 87,757
  - Density: 68/km^{2} (170/sq mi)

Ŏrang is a kun, or county, in North Hamgyŏng province in the far northeast of North Korea. It is situated on the coast of the Sea of Japan (East Sea of Korea). Originally part of Kyŏngsŏng county, Ŏrang was created in 1952 following the division of Korea.

== Physical features ==
The county is primarily mountainous, with many hills of more than 200 meters in height. However, there is a narrow plain along the coast. Approximately 85% of the county is forested. The highest peak is T'ugubong (Chosŏn'gŭl: 투구봉). There are various lakes including Changyŏn Lake (Chosŏn'gŭl: 장연호, Hancha: 長淵湖) and Mugye Lake (Chosŏn'gŭl: 무계호, Hancha: 武溪湖).

== Administrative divisions ==
Ŏrang County is divided into 1 ŭp (town), 1 rodongjagu (workers' district) and 20 ri (villages):

- Ŏrang-ŭp
- Ŏdaejil-lodongjagu
- Chibang-ri
- Ch'ilhyang-ri
- Hwamul-li
- Hwaryong-ri
- Iam-ri
- Ihyang-ri
- Mugye-ri
- Ponggang-ri
- Puam-ri
- Pup'yŏng-ri
- P'algyŏngdae-ri
- Ryanggyŏl-li
- Ryokp'yŏng-ri
- Ryongchŏl-li
- Ryongyŏl-li
- Samhyang-ri
- Soyo-ri
- Sunam-ri
- Tunam-ri
- Un'gong-ri

== Economy ==
The local economy is dominated by agriculture and fishing, and is the chief centre of rice production in North Hamgyŏng. In addition, pine mushrooms are grown there. Orang Airport is located in the county. Orang County is also home to Orangchon Power Station and Phalhyang Hydroelectric Dam on Orangchon River that has been under construction since 1981. The Phalhyang dam was completed in December 2019.

== Transport ==
Ŏrang lies on the P'yŏngra Line of the Korean State Railway. The only major road is the highway running between Ch'ŏngjin and Kimch'aek. The dual use military-public Orang Airport has domestic flights to Pyongyang.

== See also ==
- Geography of North Korea
- Administrative divisions of North Korea
