= Sŭngjŏngwŏn =

1400–1894 Joseon administrative office

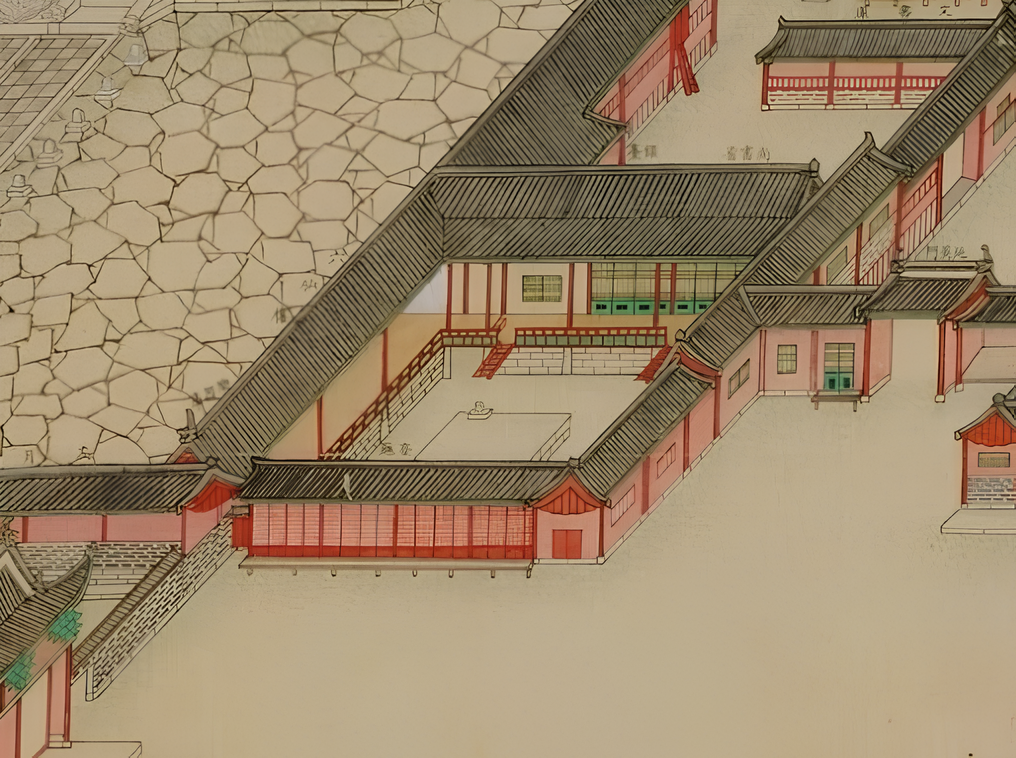
- The Sŭngjŏngwŏn building, 'Eundae', depicted in the Donggwoldo

Agency overview
- Formed: 1400
- Dissolved: 1894
- Headquarters: The inner quarters of Changdeokgung Palace, Hanseongbu, Joseon (Currently located at 99 Yulgok-ro, Waryong-dong, Jongno-gu, Seoul, South Korea.)

Korean name
- Hangul: 승정원
- Hanja: 承政院
- RR: Seungjeongwon
- MR: Sŭngjŏngwŏn

Sŭngjŏngwŏn (Korean: 승정원; Hanja: 承政院), or Royal Secretariat, was the royal administrative office during the Joseon dynasty responsible for receiving and delivering the king's orders. The office was also called Chŏngwŏn (정원; 政院), Huwŏn (후원; 喉院), Ŭndae (은대; 銀臺), or Taeŏnsa (대언사; 代言司). According to the Kyŏngguk taejŏn (Complete Codes of Law), the Sŭngjŏngwŏn had six royal secretaries (승지; 承旨; sŭngji), whose ranks were in the 3rd senior grade, as well as two recorders (주서; 注書; chusŏ).

The duties of the royal secretaries were primarily to deliver the monarch's orders to government organizations (under the Joseon administrative system the monarch never delivered his orders directly to any government office) and to report on official affairs of the state organizations to the throne. The six secretary system is explained by the fact that the government of Joseon was composed of six boards (or ministries).

The six secretaries served respectively the Boards of Personnel, War, Taxation, Rites, Works, and Punishment. However, the secretaries were not limited to liaison work between the six boards and the monarch; they also reported to the king the business of all government offices, primary among these being the State Council (Uijeongbu), the Office of Censor-General (Saganwon), and the Office of Inspector-General (Saheon-bu). As the name implies, the primary duty of the recorders was to make a record of all the official business handled by the secretaries. As the work of the secretaries had to be conducted at all hours, and it was required that they have ready access to the monarch at all times, the office of the Sŭngjŏngwŏn was established within easy reach of the king at court.

The records of the Sŭngjŏngwŏn were compiled into the Seungjeongwon ilgi (Diary of the Royal Secretariat), which remains a primary source for the study of the Joseon dynasty.

== Structure ==
The Royal Secretariat comprised:

Rank	Post	Quota	Note
Senior 3rd	Chief Royal Secretary	1	Korean: 도승지; Hanja: 都承旨
Senior 3rd	Left Royal Secretary	1	Korean: 좌승지; Hanja: 左承旨
Senior 3rd	Right Royal Secretary	1	Korean: 우승지; Hanja: 右承旨
Senior 3rd	Left Assistant Royal Secretary	1	Korean: 좌부승지; Hanja: 左副承旨
Senior 3rd	Right Assistant Royal Secretary	1	Korean: 우부승지; Hanja: 右副承旨
Senior 3rd	Sixth Royal Secretary	1	Korean: 동부승지; Hanja: 同副承旨
Senior 7th	Recorder	2	Korean: 주서; Hanja: 注書
N/A	lower clerk	28	Korean: 서리; Hanja: 書吏

== See also ==
- Seungjeongwon ilgi
- History of Korea
- Joseon Dynasty politics
