= Myongchon County =

Coordinates: 41°04′09″N 129°25′55″E

Myongchon County 명천군
- County

Korean transcription(s)
  - Chosŏn'gŭl: 명천군
  - Hancha: 明川郡
  - McCune-Reischauer: Myŏngch'ŏn-kun
  - Revised Romanization: Myeongcheon-gun
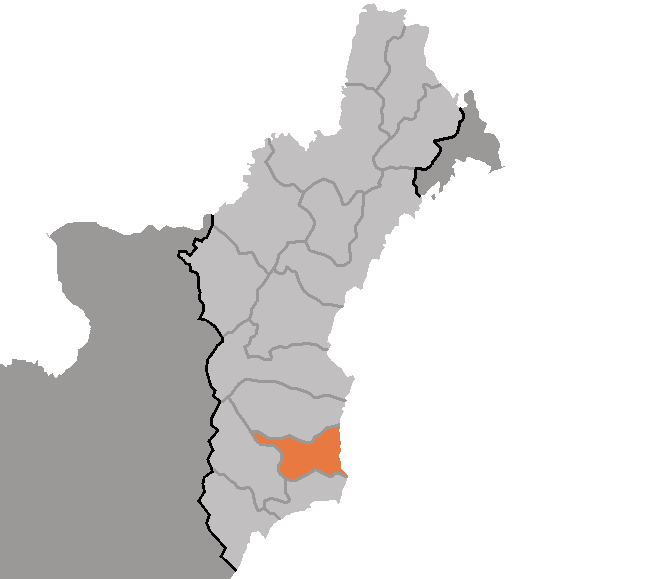
- Country: North Korea
- Province: North Hamgyong Province

Population (2008 census)
  - Total: 65,797

Myŏngch'ŏn County is a kun, or county, in North Hamgyong province, North Korea. The county is home to numerous hot springs.

== Administrative divisions ==
Myŏngch'ŏn County is divided into 1 ŭp (town), 2 rodongjagu (workers' districts) and 13 ri (villages)

- Myŏngch'ŏn-ŭp
- Ryong'am-rodongjagu
- Tokp'o-rodongjagu
- Hwangjil-li
- Hwangong-ri
- Koch'am-ri
- Manho-ri
- Masal-li
- Ŏndŏng-ri
- Poch'ol-li
- P'oha-ri
- P'ojung-ri
- Raktong-ri
- Sa-ri
- Taho-ri
- Yangchŏng-ri

== Transport ==
Myŏngch'ŏn is on the Pyongra Line railway.
