= Six Ministries of Joseon =

Historical executive bodies in Korea

- Hangul: 육조
- Hanja: 六曹
- RR: Yukjo
- MR: Yukcho

The Six Ministries of Joseon (Korean: 육조; Hanja: 六曹) were the major executive bodies of the Korean dynastic kingdom Joseon.

== History ==
The ministries system of Joseon was similar in outline to that of the preceding Goryeo, but in practice, it had a big difference. While in Goryeo the king was supposed to hold the ultimate authority, in Joseon, the scholar-officials had greater control. As such, the ministries had more power under Joseon and their importance grew as the dynasty wore on.

In December 1895, following the First Sino-Japanese War and as a part of the Gabo Reform, a cabinet of seven ministries was modeled after the Japanese one, which had been established only ten years earlier.

== Composition ==
| Title | Hangul | Hanja | Description |
|---|---|---|---|
| Ijo | 이조 | 吏曹 | Personnel |
| Hojo | 호조 | 戶曹 | Revenue |
| Yejo | 예조 | 禮曹 | Rites |
| Byeongjo | 병조 | 兵曹 | War |
| Hyeongjo | 형조 | 刑曹 | Justice |
| Gongjo | 공조 | 工曹 | Works |

== See also ==
- Politics of Joseon
- History of Korea
- Six Ministries of the Nguyễn dynasty
- Three Departments and Six Ministries — the original Chinese model; only the six ministries was retained in a similar format
- Cabinet of North Korea
- State Council (South Korea)
