= Hongmun'gwan =

Joseon-era government office

Hongmun'gwan (Korean: 홍문관; Hanja: 弘文館), or the Office of Special Advisors, was one of the Three Offices of Joseon; it acted as the Joseon dynasty's administrative and research agency.

== History ==
Hongmun'gwan was one of the Three offices of Joseon, together with the Saheonbu and the Saganwon. It was also known as the Ok-dang (옥당, 玉堂), Ok-seo (옥서, 玉署), and Yeong-gak (영각, 瀛閣). It was established in 1463 to replace the Hall of Worthies (Jiphyeonjeon·집현전).

The Hall of Worthies was the body originally tasked with answering the kings' questions, however it was abolished in 1456 by King Sejo; when many of its key officials (the "Six martyred ministers") became involved in an assassination plot in their effort to restore deposed king Danjong to the throne.

The books stored in the Hall of Worthies were moved to Yemungwan. In 1463, the Jangseogak was renamed the Hongmun'gwan. In 1478, Hongmun'gwan was divided and reformed from Yemungwan.

Hongmun'gwan maintained the books of the royal library, archived the kings writings. It also served as a research institute in the study of Confucian philosophy and to answer the king's questions. Its officials took part in the daily lessons called gyeongyeon (경연), in which they discussed history and Confucian philosophy with the king. Gyeongyeons generally took place three times a day although few kings such as Taejong and Yeonsangun abolished them. Since these discussions often led to commentary on current political issues, its officials had significant influence as advisors. It was headed by the Chief Scholar (Daejehak·대제학), who served concurrently in another high post (such as in the State Council), and Deputy Chief Scholar (Bujehak·부제학), who actually ran the office. There was great prestige attached to being Chief Scholar in this deeply Confucian society.

After the Seongjong period, Hongmun'gwan also acted on inspections and remonstrations. The Hongmun'gwan was abandoned in 1907.
