= Kyongsong County =

Kyongsong County 경성군
- County

Korean transcription(s)
  - Chosŏn'gŭl: 경성군
  - Hancha: 鏡城郡
  - McCune-Reischauer: Kyŏngsŏng kun
  - Revised Romanization: Gyeongseong-gun
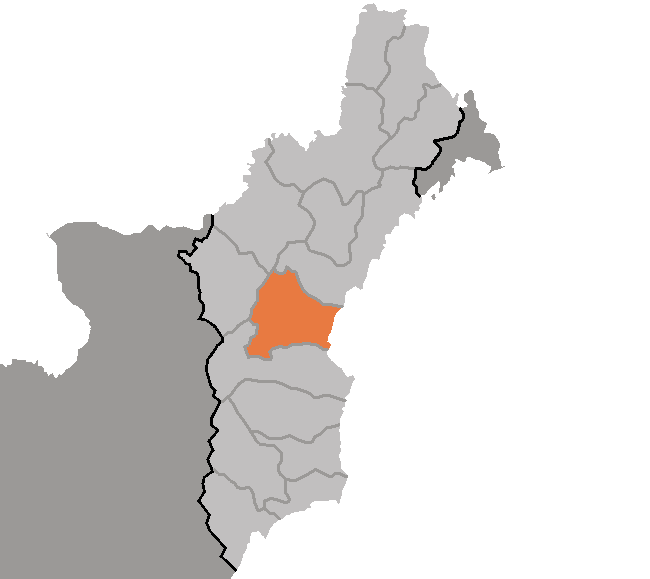
- Map of North Hamgyong showing the location of Kyongsong
- Coordinates: 41°39′N 129°29′E
- Country: North Korea
- Province: North Hamgyong
- Administrative divisions: 1 ŭp, 5 rodongjagu, 14 ri

Population (2008)
  - Total: 105,909

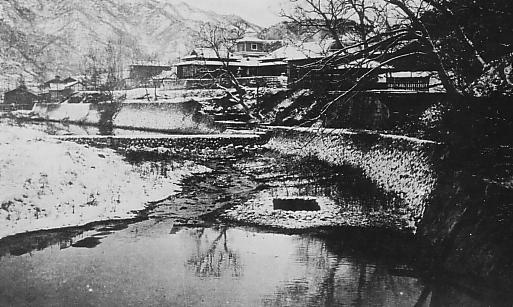
Chuul Hot spring during Korea under Japanese rule's period

Kyŏngsŏng County is a kun, or county, on the central coast of North Hamgyong, North Korea. The administrative center is located in Kyŏngsŏng-ŭp.

== Geography ==
To the west and southwest, Kyŏngsŏng is flanked by mountains, while to the east it borders Kyŏngsŏng Bay in the Sea of Japan (East Sea of Korea). In the coastal area a number of small plains are found, including Kyŏngsŏng Plain. Numerous small streams flow into the Sea of Japan, including the Kwangmoch'ŏn, Segolch'ŏn, Pokkokch'ŏn, and Och'onch'ŏn.

There are also numerous hot springs in the area. Eighty percent of the county is composed of mountain forests, of which 58.9% is evergreen and 39.9% is deciduous.

Due to its location on the Sea of Japan, Kyŏngsŏng's climate is generally mild, but the region is prone to fog. The annual average temperature is 6.6 °C (43.9 °F), −8.2 °C (17.2 °F) in January and 21.1 °C (70.0 °F) in August. The average annual rainfall is 648 mm (25.5 in) along the coast, but 800 mm (31 in) in the west.

== Administrative divisions ==
Kyŏngsŏng County is divided into 1 ŭp (town), 5 rodongjagu (workers' districts) and 14 ri (villages):

- Kyŏngsŏng-ŭp
- Haonp'o-rodongjagu
- Pakchung-rodongjagu
- Ryongch'ŏl-lodongjagu
- Saenggiryŏng-rodongjagu
- Sŭng'am-rodongjagu
- Changp'yŏng-ri
- Chungp'yŏng-ri
- Ha'myŏl-li
- Hwaha-ri
- Ilhyang-ri
- Kwanmo-ri
- Namsŏng-ri
- Ondaejil-li
- Osang-ri
- Ryonghyŏl-li
- Ryongsal-li
- Sang'onp'o-ri
- Taehyang-ri
- Tokyŏl-li

== Economy ==
=== Agriculture and fishery ===
Rice farming is carried out in the eastern region of Kyŏngsŏng. In the orchards, pears are the predominant crop. Small-scale fishing is also carried out.

=== Manufacturing ===
The area is known in North Korea as a center of ceramics manufacture.

=== Tourism ===
Tourist attractions include Kyŏngsŏng Castle and Kyŏngsŏng Nammun. In November 2023, the Kyongsong Children's Camp was inaugurated, geolocated at 41.604950°N 129.580076°E.

DPRK Supreme Leader Kim Jong Un has a seaside villa in Kyongsong.

== Education ==
- Kyongsong Industrial College (경성공업대학)
- Kyongsong College of Ceramics (경성도자기단과대학)
- Kyongsong Technical School of Medicine (경성의학전문학교)

== Transportation ==
Kyŏngsŏng lies on the Pyŏngra Line railroad.

== Divisions ==
The county is divided into one town (ŭp), five worker's districts ("rodongjagu"), and 15 villages (ri).

- Kyŏngsŏng-up
  (경성읍/鏡城邑)
- Saenggiryŏng-rodongjagu
  (생기령노동자구/生氣嶺勞動者區)
- Sŭngam-rodongjagu
  (승암노동자구/勝岩勞動者區)
- Ryongch'ŏn-rodongjagu
  (룡천노동자구/龍川勞動者區)
- Pakchung-rodongjagu
  (박충노동자구/朴忠勞動者區)
- Haonp'o-rodongjagu
  (하온포노동자구/下溫堡勞動者區)
- Sangonp'o-ri
  (상온포리/上溫堡里)
- Ryongsan-ri
  (룡산리/龍山里)
- Hamyŏn-ri
  (하면리/河面里)
- Hwaha-ri
  (화하리/花下里)
- Kwanmo-ri
  (관모리/冠帽里)
- Taehyang-ri
  (대향리/大鄕里)
- Chungp'yŏng-ri
  (중평리/仲坪里)
- Ryonghyŏn-ri
  (룡현리/龍峴里)
- Ondaejin-ri
  (온대진리/溫大津里)
- Ilhyang-ri
  (일향리/一鄕里)
- Osang-ri
  (오상리/梧上里)
- Tokyŏn-ri
  (독연리/獨淵里)
- Changpyong-ri
  (장평리/長平里)
- Namsŏk-ri
  (남석리/南夕里)
- Maehyang-ri
  (매향리/梅香里)

== See also ==
- Geography of North Korea
