= Gangwon campaign =

1592 Japanese campaign in Korea

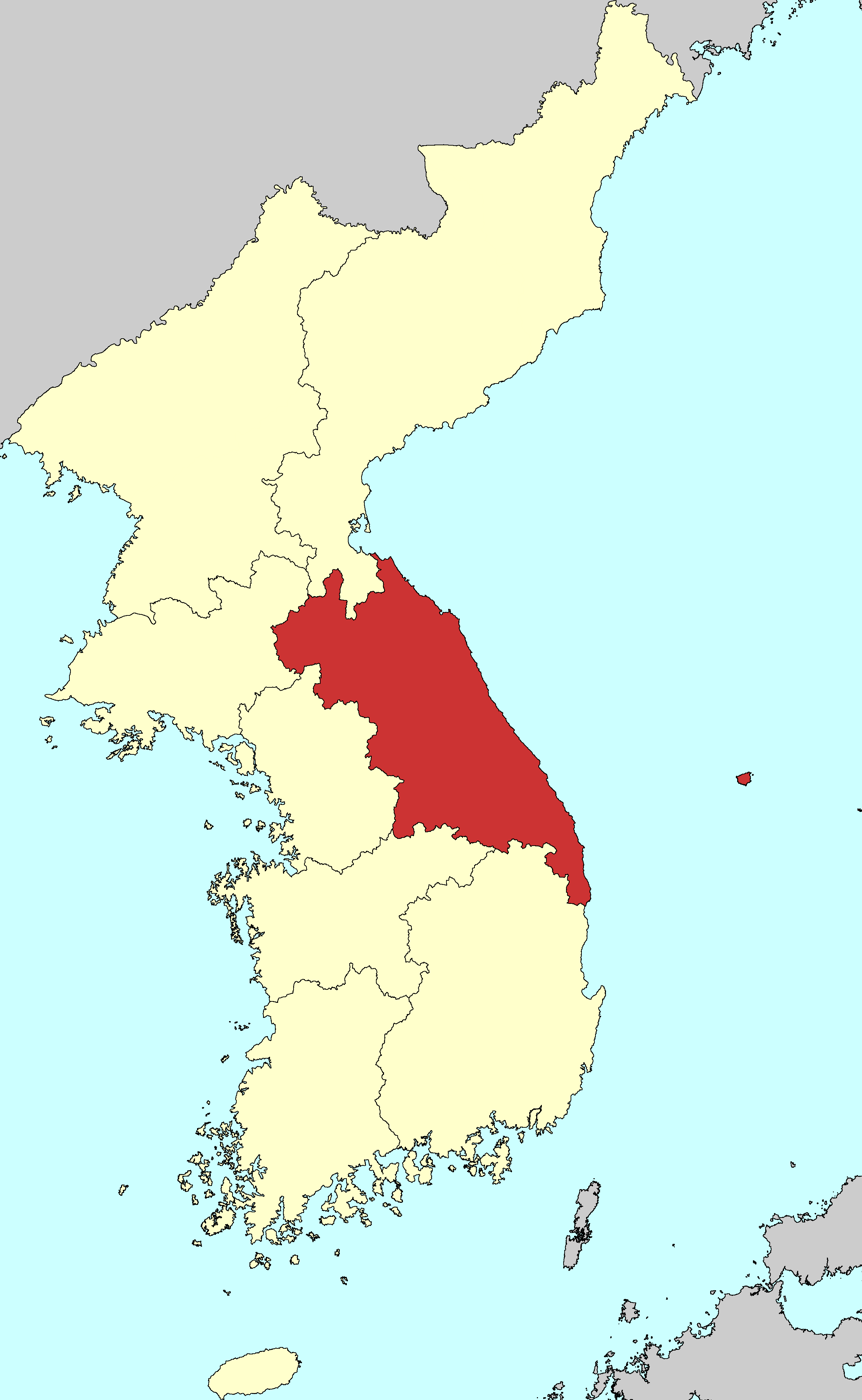
Gangwon-do during the late Joseon Dynasty

The Gangwon campaign was a campaign by the Japanese army to pacify Gangwon province, Korea in 1592, just after the beginning of the Seven Year War.

== Timeline ==
Ukita Hideie was appointed as supreme commander of the Japanese army in Korea, allotted to Mori Yoshinari's Fourth Division to be Kato Kiyomasa's rear guard by pacifying Gangwon Province.

Date	Location	Joseon Commander	Japan Commander
May 22, 1592	Yeogang	Wŏn Ho	Mori Katsunobu
June 5, 1592	Hoeyang	Kim Yŏn'gwang	Mori Katsunobu
June, 1592	Mat'an	Pyŏn Ŭngsŏng	Mori Katsunobu
June 12, 1592	Ch'ollyong	Yi Hon	Mori Katsunobu
June 19, 1592	Kimhwa	Wŏn Ho	Shimazu Toyohisa
August 11, 1592	Pyeongchang	Kwŏn Tumun	Mori Katsunobu
August 25, 1592	Wonju	Kim Chegap	Mori Katsunobu

== Japanese's Fourth Division occupation of Gangwon Province in 1592 ==
Japanese commander and their forts (all of which were captured Korean castles) :

- Itō Suketaka - Cheorwon
- Akizuki Tanenaga - Wonju
- Shimazu Tadatsune - Chuncheon
- Shimazu Yoshihiro - Yongpyon and then Kumhwa

== Mori Yoshinari's pacification of Gangwon Province ==
The province of Gangwon had been very peaceful following its occupation by Mori Yoshinari's Fourth Division, but after a few months guerilla activity erupted.

== Notes ==
(*) According to Chinese Lunar Calendar

== See also ==
- History of Korea
- Military history of Korea
- Military history of Japan
- Righteous army
