= Yu Yŏnggil =

Korean scholar-official (1538–1601)

- 유영길
- Born: 1538
- Died: 1601 (aged 62–63)
- Burial place: Chungju, South Korea
- Military career
- Allegiance: Joseon
- Conflicts: Imjin War

Korean name
- Hangul: 유영길
- Hanja: 柳永吉
- RR: Yu Yeonggil
- MR: Yu Yŏnggil

Art name
- Hangul: 월봉
- Hanja: 月蓬
- RR: Wolbong
- MR: Wŏlbong

Courtesy name
- Hangul: 덕순
- Hanja: 德純
- RR: Deoksun
- MR: Tŏksun

Yu Yŏnggil (Korean: 유영길; Hanja: 柳永吉; 1538 – 1601) was a Korean scholar-official and military leader of the mid-Joseon period. Born 1538, he passed the state civil service examination in 1559, placing first. He held various posts including Fourth Censor, Assistant Section Chief at the Ministry of War, and Deputy Compiler at the Office of Special Advisors.

Closely aligned with Yi Chŏngbin, son of powerful official Yi Ryang, Yu was nominated in 1563 to succeed him at the Ministry of Personnel but was blocked by censorial opposition. He later served as Third Censor, Records Officer, and briefly as Inspector of Pyongan Province.

At the outbreak of the Imjin War in 1592, Yu was Governor of Kangwon Province and stationed in Chuncheon. His controversial withdrawal of Commander Wŏn Ho allowed Japanese forces to cross Namhan River unopposed, and he ordered the execution of militia leader Ko Chongkyŏng. In 1593, he became Commander-in-Chief and Right Assistant Mayor of Hansŏng, and in 1594, Relief Commissioner, though he was soon dismissed after being impeached by the censorate.

During the Chŏngyu War in 1597, Yu served as Military Protector and Magistrate of Yonan, later holding posts including Second Minister of War and Governor of Gyeonggi Province. In 1600, he was appointed Second Minister of Rites, and in 1601 served briefly as Chief Judge of the Bureau of Slaves before becoming Magistrate of Songchon, where he died. He was posthumously honored with the title of Minister of Personnel.

== Early life and career ==
Yu Yŏnggil was born to Yu Ŭi (유의; 柳儀) and the daughter of No Ch'ŏm (노첨; 盧僉). In 1559, he placed first in the special state examination held in the presence of the king (알성시; 謁聖試), marking his entry into the central bureaucracy. In 1561, he was appointed Fourth Censor (정언; 正言) at the Office of the Censor-General. The following year, in 1562, he alternated between serving as Assistant Section Chief (좌랑; 佐郞) at the Ministry of War and as Fourth Censor, before being appointed as Deputy Compiler (부수찬; 副修撰) at the Office of Special Advisors. In 1563, he was promoted to Fourth Inspector (지평; 持平) at the Office of the Inspector-General.

=== Relationship with Yi Ryang ===
In 1545, King Myeongjong ascended the throne at the age of twelve. For approximately eight years, Queen Munjeong ruled as regent, during which time the young king exercised little real power and royal authority remained weakened. During her regency, her younger brother, Yun Wŏnhyŏng dominated court politics and sidelined rival factions. After the regency ended, in an effort to counter Yun's influence, Myeongjong began to favor Yi Ryang and promoted him to high office. Yu Yŏnggil, along with Yun Paekwŏn and Yi Sŏnghŏn formed close ties with Yi Ryang's son, Yi Chŏngbin, aligning himself with this emerging faction.

Yi Ryang sought to consolidate his faction's control over personnel appointments by placing allies in key positions. On the 12th day of the 7th month in 1563, he appointed his son, Yi Chŏngbin, as Assistant Section Chief at the Ministry of Personnel. Shortly thereafter, Yi Ryang himself became Minister of Personnel, violating the principle of sangp'ije (상피제; 相避制), which prohibited close relatives from holding post at same office simultaneously. As a result, Yi Chŏngbin was promptly dismissed. Following this, Yu Yŏnggil was nominated to fill the vacated post, but his appointment was blocked by the inspectors and censors(대간; 臺諫), likely due to his known association with Yi Ryang's faction. Instead, on the 16th day of the 7th month in 1563, Yu was appointed Third Censor (헌납; 獻納) at the Office of the Censor-General.

=== Dismissal ===
On the 19th day of the 8th month in 1563, Yu Yŏnggil was appointed Records Officer (전적; 典籍) at Royal Confucian Academy. However, on the same day, Ki Taehang, then Assistant Deputy Director (부제학; 副提學) at the Office of Special Advisors, and other officials submitted a memorial impeaching Yi Ryang. King Myeongjong, increasingly uneasy about Yi's growing influence, dismissed him from office. The following day, in accordance with a recommendation from the Office of the Censor-General and Office of the Inspector-General, the king ordered Yi into exile. During this purge, Yu Yŏnggil, considered a factional ally of Yi Ryang, was also dismissed despite his brief tenure.

In the 2nd month of 1565, Yu Yŏnggil was reinstated as Section Chief (정랑; 正郞) at the Ministry of War. Later, in the 11th month of the same year, he was appointed Inspector (도사; 都事) of Pyongan Province. However, due to his low rank and limited public support, he was dismissed within a week of assuming the post.

=== Official Career During Seonjo reign ===
During the reign of King Seonjo, Yu Yŏnggil served as Chief Director (정; 正) of the Office of Royal Genealogy (종부시; 宗簿寺) before being appointed Governor (관찰사; 觀察使) of Kangwon Province. He was serving in that post when the Imjin War broke out.

== Imjin War ==
=== Intervention in Wŏn Ho ===
In the 4th month of 1592, at the outbreak of the Imjin War, Yu Yŏnggil was serving as Governor of Kangwon Province. In the early phase of the war, he established a camp in Chuncheon to observe the situation, avoiding direct confrontation with the advancing Japanese forces. On the 28th day of the 4th month in 1592, following their victory at the Battle of Chungju, the First Division under Konishi Yukinaga began moving north toward Yeoju en route to Hansŏng. In response, Wŏn Ho, the Auxiliary Defense Commander (조방장; 助防將) of Kangwon Province, fortified his position at Silleuksa on the Namhan River in an effort to block the crossing.

However, Yu, prioritizing the defense of the province itself, ordered Wŏn to withdraw and reposition to the interior. As a result, the Japanese forces crossed the Namhan River with little resistance and entered Hansŏng on the 2nd day of the 5th month. Wŏn Ho later regrouped his troops and advanced toward Yeoju, where he defeated the Japanese at the Battle of Yeogang on the 22nd day of the 5th month. He achieved another victory at the Battle of Kŭmip'o (구미포; 龜尾浦) in the 6th month, significantly contributing to the defense of Yeoju. Subsequently, Yu ordered Wŏn to march north and attack Japanese stationed in Kimhwa. Wŏn complied, but on the 19th day of the 6th month, he was killed in action while engaging in an ambush against the enemy.

=== Execution of Ko Chonggyŏng ===
On the 26th day of the 6th month in 1592, three brothers—Ko Chongwŏn (고종원; 高宗遠), Ko Chonggil (고종길; 高宗吉), and Ko Chonggyŏng (고종경; 高宗慶)—raised a righteous army in the Yeongwol region of Kangwon Province, with Ko Chonggyŏng appointed as the militia leader. Yu Yŏnggil assigned approximately 500 government troops to Ko's command and ordered him to lead the combined force to Hungwŏn for military operations. During the march, however, some government soldiers deserted, delaying their arrival. Holding Ko responsible for a breach of military discipline, Yu ordered his arrest and had him escorted to Yeongwol, where he instructed the magistrate Kwŏn Tumun to execute him.

Kwŏn, who was concurrently serving as magistrate of Yeongwol, carefully examined the case. Taking into account petitions from local residents and recommendations from regional officials, he determined that Ko was not seriously at fault and reported these findings to Yu in an official dispatch. However, before the report could reach its destination, Kwŏn—acting on Yu's initial order—carried out the execution. Yu later issued a pardon for Ko, but the reprieve arrived only after the sentence had been carried out.

=== Dismissal and reappointment ===
On the 9th day of the 8th month in 1592, Yu Yŏnggil was dismissed from his post as Governor of Kangwon Province and was succeeded by Kang Sin (강신; 姜紳). However, due to Kang's failure to maintain regional defenses, Yu was reinstated to the position in the 10th month of the same year. He later held various central government posts, including Commander-in-Chief (도총관; 都摠官), Right Assistant Mayor (우윤; 右尹) of Hansŏng, and Relief Commissioner (진휼사; 賑恤使). Despite these appointments, he faced repeated censure from censorial officials aligned with the Easterners, and was ultimately removed from office.

Following his dismissal, Yu retired from political life and settled in Chungju, distancing himself from the Northerners, such as Yi Ich'ŏm. In 1597, after the outbreak of the Chŏngyu War, he was appointed first as Military Protector (호군; 護軍), and then as Magistrate of Yonan. However, at the time, he was stationed in Suan County escorting the Queen Uiin, which delayed his assumption of office. As a result, the Office of the Censor-General recommended appointing someone who could take up the post immediately, and Yu ultimately did not assume the office.

== Final years ==
In 1598, Yu Yŏnggil was appointed Second Minister (참판; 參判) of Taxation. He subsequently served as Right Assistant Mayor of Hansŏng and Second Deputy Director (동지사; 同知事) of the State Tribunal, before being appointed Governor of Gyeonggi Province in 1599. In 1600, the Office of the Inspector-General submitted a memorial requesting his dismissal due to advanced age; this recommendation was accepted, and he was reassigned as Second Minister of Rites. In 1601, he briefly served as Chief Judge (판결사; 判決事) of the Bureau of Slaves (장례원; 掌禮院) before being appointed Magistrate of Songchon.

=== Death ===
Yu Yŏnggil died in 1601 and was buried in Salmi-myeon, Chungju. After his death, he was posthumously honored with the title of Minister of Personnel.
