= Godalsaji Stupa =

Stupa at Godalsa Temple Site, Yeoju
- Godalsaji Stupa in Yeoju

Location
- Location: Sanggyo-ri, Buknae-myeon, Yeoju, Gyeonggi Province
- Country: South Korea
- Interactive map of Stupa at Godalsa Temple Site, Yeoju

Website
- http://iksan.museum.go.kr/

- Godalsaji Stupa
- Hangul: 여주 고달사지 승탑
- Hanja: 驪州 高達寺址 僧塔
- RR: Yeoju Godalsaji seungtap
- MR: Yŏju Kodalsaji sŭngt'ap

Yeoju Godalsaji Stone Stupa (Korean: 여주 고달사지 승탑; Hanja: 驪州 高達寺址 僧塔) is a stone stupa from the Goryeo Dynasty located at the site of Godalsa in Yeoju, Gyeonggi Province. It was designated a National Treasure of South Korea in 1962.

== Overview ==
The Godalsaj Stupa stands 3.4 meters tall and is a classic example of the octagonal wondang style, featuring a complete structure comprising a pedestal, a main body, and a roof stone. Its gidan is formed by placing individual stone supports—each carved from a single block—upon an octagonal foundation made of multiple stone slabs, and then stacking the lower, middle, and upper pedestal stones on top.

Overall, it faithfully adheres to the octagonal wondang-type structure—the standard form for Unified Silla stupas—while exhibiting stylistic features characteristic of the Goryeo Dynasty in the details of its carving.
