= Wŏn Ho (general) =

Korean military leader (1533–1592)

Duke Ch'ungjang Wŏn Ho
- 원호
- Born: 19th day, 11th month of 1533
- Died: 19th day, 6th month of 1592; Kimhwa, Joseon
- Cause of death: Killed in action
- Burial place: Yeoju, South Korea
- Military career
- Allegiance: Joseon
- Conflicts: Nit'anggae's Rebellion; Battle of Sonjukto; Imjin War; Battle of Yeoju; Battle of Kimhwa †

Korean name
- Hangul: 원호
- Hanja: 元豪
- RR: Won Ho
- MR: Wŏn Ho

Courtesy name
- Hangul: 중영
- Hanja: 仲英
- RR: Jungyeong
- MR: Chungyŏng

Posthumous name
- Hangul: 충장
- Hanja: 忠壯
- RR: Chungjang
- MR: Ch'ungjang

Wŏn Ho (Korean: 원호; Hanja: 元豪; 19th day, 11th month of 1533 – 19th day, 6th month of 1592) was a Korean military leader of the mid-Joseon period.

Born in 1533, Wŏn Ho abandoned scholarly pursuits in favor of the military path and passed the military service examination in 1567. He began his official career as a Military Inspector and later held both central and provincial posts. While serving as Magistrate of Kyongwon, he repelled an incursion by the rebel Jurchen leader Nitanggae. In 1587, during his tenure as Naval Commander of Right Jeolla Province, he failed to prevent a waegu raid on the Jeolla coast, resulting in his dismissal and exile. He was later pardoned and returned to hold several minor posts before retiring to his hometown.

Upon the outbreak of the Imjin War in 1592, Wŏn was appointed Auxiliary Defense Commander for Kangwon Province. There, he delayed the advance of Konishi Yukinaga's First Division and rallied fleeing troops and local militias. He achieved significant victories against Japanese forces at Silleuksa in Yeoju and at Kŭmip'o, which earned him an appointment as Magistrate of Yeoju and Auxiliary Defense Commander for both Gyeonggi and Kangwon provinces. Shortly thereafter, Wŏn responded to a call to arms issued by Governor of Kangwon, Yu Yŏnggil. While leading his troops northward, Wŏn reached Kimhwa, where he encountered a Japanese ambush. Despite fierce resistance, he was killed in action.

In recognition of his loyalty and valor, Wŏn was posthumously awarded the titles of Minister of War and Left State Councillor (Chwaŭijŏng). His spirit was later enshrined in the Ch'ungjangsa in Kimhwa and Ch'ungnyŏlsa in Wonju. His posthumous honorific was Ch'ungjang (忠壯, Loyal and Resolute).

== Early life ==
Wŏn Ho was born on 19th day, 11th month of 1533, to Wŏn Songsu (원송수; 元松壽) and Lady An of the Sunheung An clan. Losing his father before reaching the age of ten, Wŏn pursued his studies under the tutelage of Kim Tŏksu (김덕수; 金德秀) and maintained close friendships with the brothers Yun Tusu and Yun Kŭnsu, as well as Yi Haesu (이해수; 李海壽). Yun Tusu, Yun Kŭnsu, and Yi Haesu passed the civil service examinations in 1558 and 1563 respectively, subsequently entering officialdom. However, Wŏn Ho failed to pass the examinations.

Disheartened by his lack of success, Wŏn abandoned his pursuit of the civil examination and resolved to enter the military route instead. Although Yun Tusu and Yun Kŭnsu attempted to dissuade him, assuring him of their support, Wŏn Ho insisted that he must succeed through his own efforts. He dedicated himself to the study of martial arts and ultimately passed the military service examination in 1567.

== Early career ==
Wŏn Ho began his official career in 1567 when he was appointed as a Military Inspector (선전관; 宣傳官). He concurrently served as an Assistant Confidential Affairs Officer (비국랑; 備局郞) of Border Defense Council (Pibyŏnsa) and was subsequently promoted to the sixth rank, holding posts such as a Judge (통판; 通判) of Gyeongju, and county magistrate in Unsan and Tanchon. He also served as magistrate in northern frontier towns such as Kyonghung and Kyongwon.

=== Nit'anggae's rebellion ===
In 1583, during his tenure in the Kyongwon region, Wŏn assisted Provincial Patrol Commissioner (도순찰사; 都巡察使) Chŏng Ŏnsin and Defense Commander (방어사; 防禦使) Yi Yong in suppressing the rebellion led by the Jurchen leader Nit'anggae. Following the suppression, as magistrate of Kyonghung, he helped develop military farming colonies (둔전; 屯田) on Noktundo under Chŏng's command and strengthened border defenses. However, while serving again as magistrate of Kyongwon, Wŏn was dismissed from office and sent into retirement after failing to properly receive Royal Inspector Yi Kwang, who had been dispatched to investigate provincial affairs.

=== Japanese invasion of Sonjukto in 1587 ===
Several years after his dismissal, Wŏn Ho was recommended for the post of Naval Commander (수군절도사; 水軍節度使) of Right Jeolla Province amid rising incursions by Japanese marauders. In 1587, a significant incident occurred when waegu (Japanese pirates) invaded and occupied Sonjukto, an island off the Left Jeolla coast. Wŏn mobilized the Right Jeolla naval forces in response, but suffered a defeat, losing five ambush vessels during the engagement. As a consequence of this military failure, Wŏn was imprisoned and subsequently exiled to Gangjin.

Wŏn was later released and returned to government service, holding posts such as Garrison Commander (첨사; 僉使) of Manpo and Military Assistant Commissioner (우후; 虞侯) of Pyongan Province. Ultimately, he was dismissed from office and retired to his hometown.

== Imjin War ==
Upon learning of the outbreak of the Imjin War, Wŏn Ho traveled to Hansŏng. He was appointed Auxiliary Defense Commander (조방장; 助防將) of Kangwon Province, tasked with securing the eastern route to the capital. This route ran from Chungju through Yeoju and Yanggŭn, ultimately leading to Hansŏng. On 28th day, 4th month of 1592, the First Division under Konishi Yukinaga occupied Chungju and proceeded toward Yeoju with the intention of entering Hansŏng.

To block the Japanese advance, Wŏn established a defensive position at Silleuksa, a temple located along the Namhan River in Yeoju, marking the border between Gyeonggi and Kangwon provinces. For two days, he successfully held off Konishi's forces. However, Yu Yŏnggil, the Governor of Kangwon, recalled Wŏn to Wonju for the defense of the provincial heartland. This allowed Konishi's troops to successfully cross the Namhan River and enter Hansŏng 2nd day, 5th month of 1592.

On 3rd day, 5th month of 1592, Yi Kwang, the Patrol Commissioner of Jeolla Province, ordered a retreat of his forces upon hearing rumors of the fall of Hansŏng and King Seonjo's flight. On the following day, he also issued proclamations preventing loyalist forces from marching northward, which resulted in the dispersal of Wŏn's troops. In response, Wŏn mobilized local militias to rebuild a military base of operations.

=== Battle of Yeoju ===
Wŏn Ho regrouped with local militia and returned to Yeoju, where, on 22nd day, 5th month of 1592, he launched a successful attack on Japanese forces stationed near Silleuksa. Following the battle, he presented the spoils of war to the royal court and reported his achievements. In recognition of his valor, the court promoted him to the rank of Kasŏn Taebu (가선대부; 嘉善大夫) and appointed him Magistrate of Yeoju and Auxiliary Defense Commander for both Gyeonggi and Kangwon provinces on 26th day, 5th month of 1592.

In 6th month of 1592, Japanese troops under the command of Mōri Katsunobu—leader of the Fourth Division assigned to the Kangwon region—began pillaging the countryside. In response, Wŏn launched a surprise attack at Kŭmip'o (구미포; 龜尾浦). The Japanese attempted to defend themselves by retreating into civilian homes, but Wŏn's forces surrounded them, killing over fifty enemy soldiers. This victory effectively severed the main route connecting Wonju to Hansŏng, disrupting Japanese troop movements.

=== Death ===
Subsequently, Governor Yu Yŏnggil again recalled Wŏn to the interior of Kangwon Province and tasked him with expelling Japanese forces from the northern front. On 19th day, 6th month of 1592, Wŏn advanced toward Kimhwa via Chuncheon in an attempt to eliminate the remaining troops under Mōri Katsunobu. However, the Japanese under the command of Shimazu Toyohisa, having anticipated his route, laid an ambush. Unaware of the trap, Wŏn's forces were surrounded during their advance. He retreated into mountainous terrain and continued fighting, but with the majority of his troops killed in action, he ordered the remnants to withdraw and chose to leap off a cliff, ending his life in the field.
