= Lee Yeoung-sup =

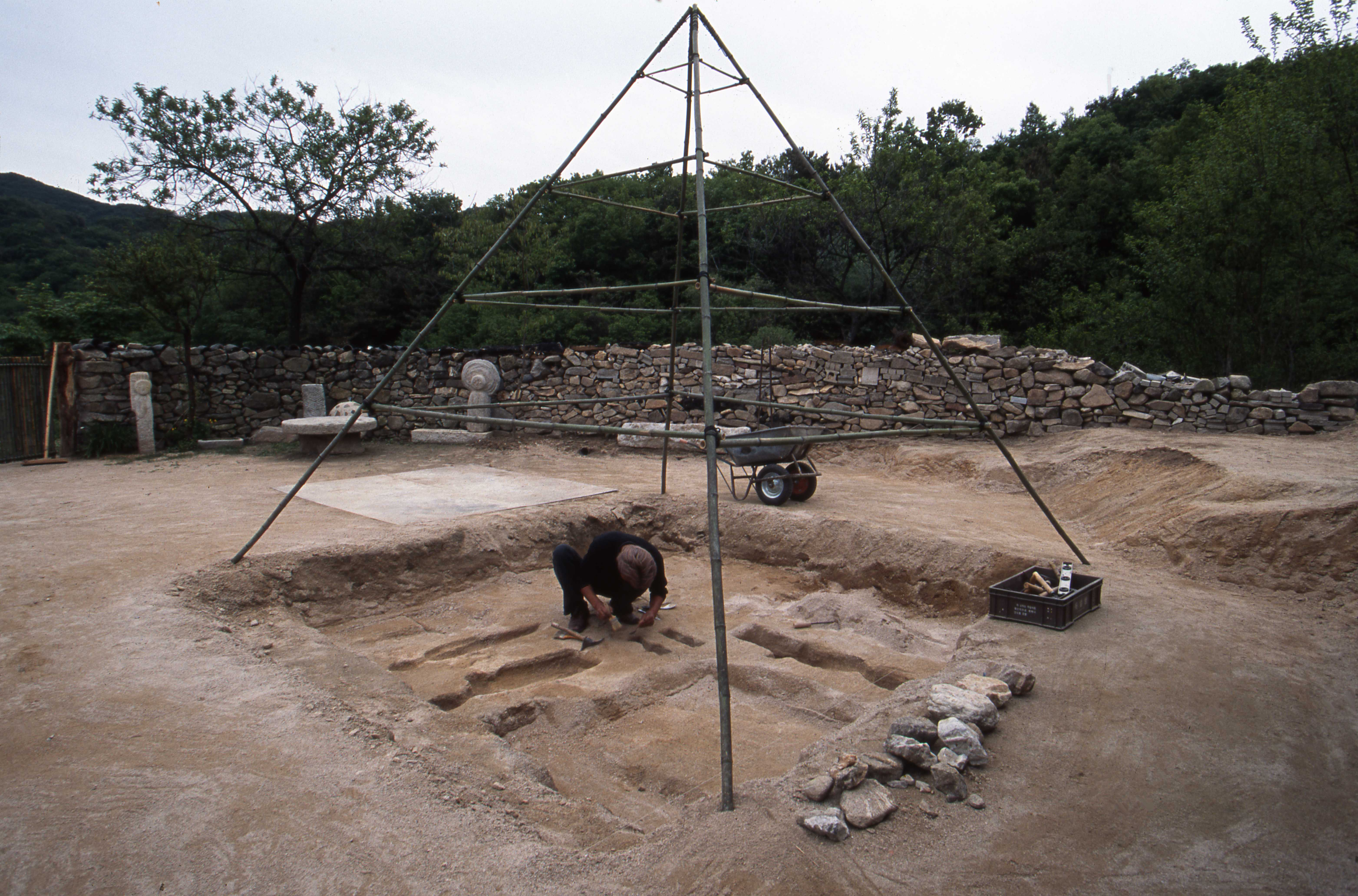
조각가 이영섭 발굴모습

Lee Yeoung-sup (이영섭, born 1964), also spelled Lee Young-sup, is a South Korean artist best known as a sculptor. Lee has been praised for his trademark technique of burying his naturally-themed works to allow for natural weathering and later "excavating" the finished sculptures. His workshop is located in the county of Yangpyeong within Gyeonggi Province.

== Life ==
Lee Yeoung-sup was born in Yeoju, Gyeonggi Province. His workshop is located at the archaeological site of the Godalsa temple in Gyeonggi Province.

== Techniques and reception ==
Much of Lee's work is characterized by natural materials, such as carved wood and stone. Sedimentary sections, tiles, pottery shards, and the like are often a part of his deliberately rustic works. Lee's process consists of his using natural materials to loosely sculpt a piece and then burying the piece to add natural weathering and wear. He then "excavates" the noticeably rougher finished sculpture. Critic Choi Tae-man explains the process in detail: "[Lee Yeoung-sup] first prepares a drawing of the object, then he etches a second drawing using while China clay into the earth of the courtyard of his studio, and fills like a mold the inside the etching with cement, sand, plaster and fragments of terra cotta. The resulting molded form, which is solid and rough, reminds us of a clay statuette or small mummy."

The prevalent theme of "time" present in Lee's technique and sculptures has been praised as one of the most prominent facets of his work. Professor Lee Jinkyung of the Seoul National University of Technology has praised both Lee Yeoung-sup's "excavation" technique of creating sculptures and the resulting artwork, stating that the artist "excavates life that is encapsulated in time." Additionally, Professor Lee notes that "Lee Yeoung-sup who likes simple, uncomplicated figures creates an uncanny sense of time", and that the artist's works are almost a sort of "realism... not imbued with tension, but one that gives comfort and warmth with a hint of humor."

Art critic Choi Tae-man also praises Lee's process and resulting work: "Lee Yeoung-sup's creative process demonstrates that what has disappeared has not really disappeared, but just been forgotten; and that things exist underground and send signals to those who might love them while they wait to be discovered one day. His simple, unfashionable ford are in the image of archaeological remains." Choi notes the uniqueness of Lee's technique and artwork as a "difficult, original and creative style founded on his desire to pour into his work the continuity of time that he has witnessed and admired at the foot of the archaeological site of the Godal Temple, in which his studio is located. He shows us that time is not lost, but rediscovered."

As of 2016, Lee's works are still on display worldwide in both group and private exhibitions.

== See also ==
- Korean art
