= Pyŏn Ŭngsŏng =

Korean military leader (1552–1616)

Duke Yanghye Pyŏn Ŭngsŏng
- Born: 29th day, 3rd month of 1552
- Died: 1616
- Burial place: Namyangju, South Korea
- Military career
- Allegiance: Joseon
- Conflicts: Imjin War; Battle of Mat'an

Korean name
- Hangul: 변응성
- Hanja: 邊應星
- RR: Byeon Eungseong
- MR: Pyŏn Ŭngsŏng

Courtesy name
- Hangul: 기중
- Hanja: 機仲
- RR: Gijung
- MR: Kijung

Posthumous name
- Hangul: 양혜
- Hanja: 襄惠
- RR: Yanghye
- MR: Yanghye

Pyŏn Ŭngsŏng (Korean: 변응성; Hanja: 邊應星; 29th day, 3rd month of 1552 – 1616) was a Korean military leader of the mid-Joseon period. Born in 1552, he passed the military examination in 1579 and was appointed Magistrate of Kanggye, a position he resigned following his father's death.

Pyon was recalled to service in 1592 with the outbreak of the Imjin War and appointed Mayor of Gyeongju. As the city had already fallen to the Japanese, he could not assume the post and was appointed Magistrate of Icheon. There, in cooperation with Wŏn Ho, he defeated Japanese forces at Mat'an.

In the 8th month of the same year, Pyŏn suffered defeat at the Battle of Gapyeong and was demoted to serve in the army in plain attire. By the 10th month of 1593, however, he was recommended by Yu Sŏngnyong and appointed Defense Commander of Gyeonggi. In 1594, he suppressed bandit activity in the province, mobilized monk-soldiers, oversaw the construction of palisades at Yongjin along the upper Han River, and supervised military training.

After the war, Pyŏn, as Magistrate of Suwon, directed the reconstruction of Toksansŏng. He continued to hold significant offices under King Gwanghaegun, but in 1613 he was falsely implicated in a treason case. Having resigned as Commander of the Directorate of Military Training, he declined further appointment and died in 1616.

== Early life and career ==
Pyŏn Ŭngsŏng was born on the 29th day, 3rd month of 1552. He belonged to the Gyeongju Yi Clan; his father, Pyŏn Hyŏp, served as magistrate of Haenam, where he repelled incursions of waegu (Japanese pirates), and held other official posts, while his mother was a daughter of Ch'oe Yusŏn (최유선; 崔有善) of the Hwasun Ch'oe clan. Influenced by the example of his father, who had served as a military officer, Pyŏn Ŭngsŏng likewise embarked upon a military career.

In 1579, Pyŏn passed the triennial military examination with third-tier honors (병과; 丙科). He subsequently served as Royal Messenger (선전관; 宣傳官), Vice Director (부정; 副正) at the Office of Military Training (훈련원; 訓鍊院), and Magistrate of Ryonggang, Hamjong, and Jangdan, among other posts. In 1589, during a special recruitment of military officials conducted by the Border Defense Council, he was recommended by Yu Hong, Yi Chŏn, and Sin Rip. The following year, while serving as Magistrate of Kanggye, he resigned his office to observe the customary mourning period for his father's death.

== Imjin War ==
=== Outbreak of the Imjin War ===
In the 4th month of 1592, following the outbreak of the Imjin War, the Japanese army, after capturing Dongnae, advanced northward in three separate divisions. Alarmed by this development, the Joseon court dismissed Yun Inham, the Mayor (부윤; 府尹) of Gyeongju, on account of his age and frailty, and recalled Pyŏn Ŭngsŏng from mourning to appoint him as Yun's successor. On the same day, Pyŏn offered his farewell at the royal court and departed with his military aides. By the 21st day of the same month, however, Gyeongju fortress had already fallen. When Pyŏn arrived, the city was under Japanese control, precluding him from assuming office. He was subsequently appointed Provincial Naval Commander (수군절도사; 水軍節度使) of Left Gyeongsang, but he did not assume the post. Thereafter, he was appointed Magistrate of Icheon.

=== Battle of Mat'an ===
Around the 10th day, 6th month of 1592, after Wŏn Ho had annihilated Japanese forces at Kumip'o (구미포; 龜尾浦), he continued to monitor their movements. Upon learning that the Japanese was plundering in the direction of Mat'an (마탄; 馬灘), he dispatched a messenger to inform Pyŏn Ŭngsŏng. In response, Pyŏn pledged with Wŏn Ho to join forces in eliminating the Japanese and began preparing for battle. After conferring, the two selected elite archers, loaded them onto boats, and, on a misty morning, sailed down the middle reaches of the Han River toward Mat'an.

Pyŏn devised an ambush by disguising his vessels as cargo boats, concealing their decks beneath awnings. Deceived into believing that these were plunder-laden craft, the Japanese anticipated the arrival of spoils and lined up along the riverbank. When Pyŏn's boats approached the shore, his men, already positioned for combat, suddenly discharged a concentrated volley of arrows. Taken off guard and unable to mount a defense, dozens of Japanese were slain immediately, while the remainder retreated in disarray. Pyŏn's forces then disembarked, pursued the fugitives inland, and secured a decisive rout.

=== Demotion ===
In the 8th month of 1592, Pyŏn Ŭngsŏng participated in the Battle of Gapyeong in coordination with Cho Kyŏng. The engagement ended in defeat, compelling their withdrawal and leaving the surrounding population exposed to severe depredations at the hands of Japanese forces. In response, the Border Defense Council attributed responsibility to Pyŏn and Cho, submitting a petition that they be demoted to the ranks of common soldiers, a proposal that King Seonjo subsequently approved. The following month, Sŏng Yŏng assembled the remnants of Wŏn Ho's former troops at Yeoju to organize a new force. Pyŏn enlisted under Sŏng's command and was stationed at Icheon, though he lacked the military resources necessary to undertake offensive operations against the Japanese. From this position he attempted an advance toward Chuksan, yet his forces were repulsed and obliged to withdraw once more.

The following year, reinstated as Magistrate of Icheon, Pyŏn, upon reports in the 4th month of 1593 that Japanese troops had desecrated Seonjeongneung, joined with Yi Kibin, the Magistrate of Gwangju, in delivering a successful counterattack against the Japanese. Later that year, in the 10th month of 1593, and on the recommendation of Yu Sŏngnyong, Pyŏn received appointment as Defense Commander (방어사; 防禦使) of Gyeonggi Province.

=== Defense of Seoul ===
As Defense Commander of Gyeonggi, Pyŏn Ŭngsŏng concentrated his efforts on safeguarding the approaches to the capital. The districts of Yeoju and Icheon were particularly unsettled, as impoverished peasants, driven to desperation by the devastations of the Imjin War, had resorted to banditry. Pyŏn undertook measures to suppress these groups and succeeded in restoring order to the region. Establishing his base at Yongjin (용진; 龍津), a strategically vital stronghold situated on the upper reaches of the Han River, he organized and trained bands of Buddhist monk-soldiers while simultaneously opening military farms to support his troops. He also sought to construct new fortifications to strengthen the province's defenses, although these plans ultimately remained unrealized.

In the 6th month of 1594, Pyŏn Ŭngsŏng temporarily withdrew from office following the death of his mother. However, the Border Defense Council petitioned for his reinstatement, and he was soon recalled to duty. That same year, in the 8th month, widespread banditry broke out across Gwangju, Yangsŏng, and Chuksan. Pyŏn coordinated with the Provincial Pacification Commissioner (토포사; 討捕使), Pak Myŏnghyŏn (박명현; 朴名賢), to quell the unrest. He dispatched detachments to several key points, including the vicinity of Kyŏngan Post Station (경안역; 景安驛) in Gwangju and the corridor between Yongin and Yangji, where his forces succeeded in suppressing the bandits and restoring order.

Around 1595, Pyŏn Ŭngsŏng undertook the construction of wooden palisades at Yongjin. Yet, in the 6th month of that year, the Border Defense Council issued a censure, observing that during his year-long stationing there he had accomplished little of substance and that his proposed measures were poorly conceived. With repeated denunciations from both the Border Defense Council and the Office of the Inspector-General, Pyŏn was ultimately dismissed from his post.

Pyŏn Ŭngsŏng was soon reinstated and assigned to the defense of the fortress P'asasŏng during Yi Monghak's Rebellion. In 1596, when peace talks between Ming China and Japan collapsed and the prospect of a renewed Japanese invasion loomed, the court, in the 12th month, augmented his command with more than three thousand government troops. Pyŏn organized these forces into detachments and deployed them across twenty-five river fords stretching from Yanggŭn and Gwangju to the capital, thereby consolidating the defensive perimeter of Seoul.

== Posts-war career ==
=== Reinforcement of the fortress Toksansŏng ===
After the conclusion of the Imjin War, in the 10th month of 1599, while serving as Provincial Military Commander of Chungcheong, Pyŏn Ŭngsŏng was dismissed from office on the charge of having failed to properly investigate the case of Yi Wibin (이위빈; 李渭濱), who had been imprisoned on suspicion of treason, despite substantial evidence against him. Subsequently, Pyŏn held posts in the northern provinces before being appointed, in the 2nd month of 1602, as Magistrate of Suwon, concurrently serving as Defense Commander of Gyeonggi Province.

As Magistrate of Suwon, Pyŏn oversaw the reconstruction of the mountain fortress Toksansŏng. He reinforced its defenses by heightening and rebuilding the walls in stone, excavating a moat, and securing water supplies through the digging of wells. He further arranged for the cultivation of fields within the fortress and installed a range of defensive armaments, including crossbows, stone-throwers, cannons, and fire arrows. Military drills were conducted under his direction with the rigor of actual combat. Within a year, the fortress had developed into a community of more than two hundred households, leading the court to commend Pyŏn for his distinguished service. In 1604, Pyŏn Ŭngsŏng was appointed Provincial Military Commander of Jeolla, and in 1606, he was transferred to the same post of South Hamgyong.

=== Final years ===
With the accession of King Gwanghaegun in 1608, Pyŏn was appointed as Chief Commander of the Right Capital Police and subsequently as Left Assistant Mayor (좌윤; 左尹) of Hansŏng. Thereafter, he advanced to the post of Provincial Military Commander of Pyongan, before returning to the capital as Right Assistant Mayor (우윤; 右尹). In the 11th month of 1609 he assumed the office of Provincial Naval Commander of Gyeonggi, and in 1611 attained the position of Grand Commander of the Capital (유도대장; 留都大將). In the 8th month of 1612, while serving as Associate Director (동지사; 同知事), Pyŏn was designated a recipient of merit rewards, which he declined. Rather than rescind the award, the court extended recognition to Pyŏn's associates. Even so, recurrent petitions demanding his removal were submitted.

The following year, Pyŏn was falsely implicated in a treason investigation, summoned before King Gwanghaegun, and personally interrogated. Maintaining his innocence, Pyŏn was eventually cleared when it was revealed that Chŏng Hyŏp (정협; 鄭浹) had misappropriated his name; Pyŏn was accordingly released. Thereafter, Pyŏn was reappointed Commander of the Directorate of Military Training (훈련도감; 訓鍊都監). Yet persistent calls for his dismissal and exile again forced his removal from office. Although King Gwanghaegun made repeated attempts to restore him to this command, Pyŏn refused to resume service and died in 1616.
