= Won-ho =

- Hangul: 원호
- RR: Wonho
- MR: Wŏnho

Won-ho is a Korean given name.

People with this name include:

- Li Won-ho (born 1972), North Korean short track speed skater
- Shin Won-ho (director) (born 1975), South Korean television producer and director
- Wonny Song (Korean name Song Won-ho; born 1978), South Korean-born Canadian pianist
- Wonho Chung (born 1980), South Korean comedian
- Shin Won-ho (born 1991), South Korean actor
- Wonho (born Lee Ho-seok, 1993), South Korean singer, ex-member of Monsta X
- Kim Won-ho (born 1999), South Korean badminton player

== See also ==
- List of Korean given names
- Wŏn Ho (general) (born 1533), Joseon military leader
