= Kim Chegap =

Korean scholar-official (1525–1592)

Duke Munsuk Kim Chegap
- Born: 17th day, 5th month of 1525; Hansong, Joseon
- Died: 25th day, 8th month of 1592; Wonju, Joseon
- Cause of death: Killed in action
- Burial place: Goesan, South Korea
- Citizenship: Joseon
- Occupation: Literati official
- Known for: Imjin War; Siege of Yeongwon †

Korean name
- Hangul: 김제갑
- Hanja: 金悌甲
- RR: Gim Jegap
- MR: Kim Chegap

Art name
- Hangul: 의재
- Hanja: 毅齋
- RR: Uijae
- MR: Ŭijae

Courtesy name
- Hangul: 순초
- Hanja: 順初
- RR: Suncho
- MR: Sunch'o

Posthumous name
- Hangul: 문숙
- Hanja: 文肅
- RR: Munsuk
- MR: Munsuk

Kim Chegap (Korean: 김제갑; Hanja: 金悌甲; 17th day, 5th month of 1525 – 25th day, 8th month of 1592) was a Korean scholar-official of the mid-Joseon period. Born 1525, in Hansŏng, Kim Chegap studied under the guidance of Yi Mun'gŏn, Yun Kae and Yi Hwang. Kim passed the irregular civil service examination in 1553, thereby entering government service. His official career began in 1554 with an appointment as Assistant Proofreader at the Office of Special Advisors.

Kim Chegap rose through government ranks from his appointment as Fourth Censor in 1573 to various high offices, including Second Deputy Director of the Privy Council and Provincial Governor of Chungcheong and Hwanghae. In 1578, he successfully led a horse tribute mission to the Ming court, receiving commendations from both the Wanli Emperor and King Seonjo. In 1583, Kim was dismissed amid factional strife after co-signing a counter-memorial challenging the king's support for a student petition defending the Westerners. Though briefly reappointed, his 1587 post was revoked due to concerns about his age. He later served as magistrate in Gwangju, Hwanghae, and Wonju.

During the Imjin War, Kim Chegap remained at his post in Wonju despite dire shortages in troops and supplies. He organized the evacuation of civilians to Yŏngwŏn Fortress and later relocated there, reinforcing its defenses. On the 24th day of the 8th month in 1592, Japanese forces launched a full-scale assault and captured the fortress. Refusing to flee, Kim continued fighting until he was captured and killed on the 25th day of the 8th month in 1592.

In recognition of his loyalty and valor, Kim was posthumously awarded the titles of Minister of Personnel and Chief State Councillor. His spirit was later enshrined in the Ch'ungnyŏlsa in Wonju and Hwaŏm Seowon in Goesan. His posthumous honorific was Munsuk.

== Early life ==
=== Birth and education ===
Kim Chegap was born on 17th day, 5th month of 1525, in Pansŏkpang, Hansŏngbu (present-day Seoul), as the fourth of five sons of Kim Sŏk (김석; 金錫) and Lady Ki of the Haengju Ki clan. Following the death of his father in 1534, he began his studies in 1535 under his uncle by marriage, Yi Mun'gŏn (이문건; 李文楗).

In 1542, Kim married the daughter of Yun Kae and continued his academic training under his father-in-law's guidance. The next year, in 1543, he became a disciple of the Confucian scholar Yi Hwang. In 1545, he passed the Literary Licentiate Examination (진사시; 進士試), and in 1553, he passed the irregular civil service examination (별시문과; 別試文科) with third-tier honors (병과; 丙科), thereby entering government service.

=== Early career ===
Kim Chegap began his official career in 1554 with his appointment as Assistant Proofreader (부정자; 副正字) at the Office of Special Advisors. In the following year, he was promoted to Proofreader (정자; 正字) within the same office and subsequently served in various positions, including Assistant Section Chief (좌랑; 佐郞) at the Ministry of War and Magistrate of Okcheon.

In 1566, he was dispatched to Busan as a Commissioner for Refreshing the Envoy (선위사; 宣慰使), where he received a diplomatic delegation from Japan. Upon his return, he was appointed Music Instructor (사예; 司藝) at the Royal Confucian Academy. In 1567, he was appointed Magistrate of Namyang.

== Career during Seonjo reign ==
In 1573, Kim Chegap assumed the post of Fourth Censor (정언; 正言) at the Office of the Censor-General. In the autumn of 1578, Kim was promoted to the senior third rank and appointed Second Deputy Director (첨지사; 僉知事) of the Privy Council (Chunch'ubu).

In the same year, he was selected as Royal Gift Convoy (관압사; 管押使) and was charged with delivering a tribute of fifty horses to Ming court. He successfully transported the horses from the Seoul to Beijing without incident. In recognition of his service, Wanli Emperor awarded him four rolls of silk and a horse. In the following year, King Seonjo presented him with government-produced liquor (관온; 官醞) and a tiger-skin blanket, and appointed him Sixth Royal Secretary (동부승지; 同副承旨) of the Royal Secretariat, Royal Secretariat.

Later, Kim Chegap served as magistrate of Haeju and later of Jinju. During his tenure in Jinju, he earned recognition for stabilizing civil administration and effectively curbing the influence of powerful local lineages. His accomplishments in regional governance are documented in his collected writings, Ŭijaeyugo (의재유고; 毅齋遺稿).

In 1581, Kim was appointed to several high-ranking posts, including Right Assistant Royal Secretary (우부승지; 右副承旨), Chief Censor (대사간; 大司諫), and Provincial Governor (관찰사; 觀察使) of Chungcheong. The following year, in 1582, he was appointed Provincial Governor of Hwanghae, where he oversaw all aspects of provincial administration.

=== Dismissal from office ===
In 1583, while serving as Right Royal Secretary (우승지; 右承旨) of the Royal Secretariat, Kim Chegap became embroiled in factional strife between the Easterners and the Westerners. At the time, Pak Kŭnwŏn, the Chief Royal Secretary (도승지; 都承旨) and a leading figure among the Easterners, spearheaded efforts to impeach prominent Western figures such as Yi I, Sŏng Hon, and Pak Sun.

On the 5th day of the 8th month that year, a collective memorial was submitted by Yu Kongjin (유공진; 柳拱辰), a student at the Royal Confucian Academy, along with 462 fellow Confucian students. The memorial defended Yi I and Sŏng Hon and criticized the Eastern faction's continuing efforts to impeach them. Ha Rak (하락; 河洛) further accused the faction of fomenting partisan agitation through coercive and manipulative means, denouncing such behavior as a "ruinous practice of factional indoctrination." King Seonjo responded to the memorial with general approval.

On the following day, the 6th day of the month, Kim Chegap, along with the Chief Royal Secretary Pak Kŭnwŏn, Right Assistant Royal Secretary Yi Wŏnik, and the Sixth Royal Secretary Sŏng Rak (성락; 成洛), submitted a counter-memorial expressing concern over the king's favorable response to the students' petition. In response, King Seonjo ordered an inquiry into the drafting of the rebuttal. Yi Wŏnik declined to reveal the authorship. As a result, all four officials involved in the submission, including Kim Chegap, were dismissed from office. Kim thereafter retired to his hometown.

=== Reappointment ===
In 1587, at the age of sixty-two, Kim Chegap was specially appointed Magistrate of Changsong as part of an initiative to reinforce border defenses in Pyongan Province. However, this appointment was rescinded following opposition from Minister of War Chŏng Ŏnsin, who argued that entrusting such a critical military post to an elderly civil official was inappropriate. Subsequently, on 16th day, 11st month of 1588, Kim was dismissed from office and reassigned as Magistrate of Gwangju in 1589.

In 1590, he resumed the post of Governor of Hwanghae Province, and in the following year, 1591, he returned to central government service as Third Minister (참의; 參議) in the Ministry of Public Works. However, due to the principle of sangp'ije (상피제; 相避制)—which prohibited simultaneous service of close relatives in government—he was transferred to a regional post, as his son Kim Sihŏn (김시헌; 金時獻) was then serving as a Personnel Officer (전랑; 銓郎) in the Ministry of Personnel. Kim was thus appointed Magistrate of Wonju.

== Imjin War ==
In the 4th month of 1592, following the outbreak of the Imjin War and the northward advance of Japanese forces, a large contingent of government troops stationed in Wonju—then serving as the seat of the Gangwon Provincial Office—was mobilized to reinforce defenses along the Chungju front. However, after the defeat of the Joseon army at the Battle of Chungju on the 27th day of the same month, additional regional units from Gangwon Province were conscripted for the defense of the capital, leaving the province largely devoid of regular military forces.

Meanwhile, the Japanese Fourth Division under the command of Mōri Katsunobu advanced into Gangwon Province via Hansŏng. Advancing through Dongducheon, the division successively occupied Cheorwon, Kimhwa, and Hoeyang, before reaching Anbyon—a strategic point near the border with Hamgyong Province—on the 17th day of the 6th month. The division subsequently regrouped in Hoeyang and proceeded southward through Pyeongchang, arriving in Wonju in the early part of the 8th month.

At the time of the Japanese arrival, defensive conditions in Wonju were highly unfavorable. The city faced a severe shortage of manpower and military provisions, and public morale was markedly low. Despite these constraints, Kim Chegap remained in position and initiated preparations for a final defense.

=== Siege of Yŏngwŏn ===
Kim Chegap personally supervised the fortification of Wonju Fortress and organized the evacuation of non-combatants—including the elderly, women, and children—to Yŏngwŏn Mountain Fortress, the most defensible terrain within the local jurisdiction. Kim placed the civilians under the protection of Chŏng Sayŏng (정사영; 鄭士榮). At Chŏng's urging to consider his own safety and seek refuge, Kim later relocated to Yŏngwŏn Fortress for his own safety. Upon arrival, he established a comprehensive defensive posture by stockpiling grain and fresh water within the fortress and constructing defensive obstacles along the perimeter.

On the 23rd day of the 8th month in 1592, Kim Chegap ordered Pak Chongnam (박종남; 朴宗男) to conduct an ambush against Japanese forces at Kariryŏng Pass. The operation was unsuccessful due to inaccurate intelligence from a reconnaissance unit. On the following day, Mōri Katsunobu dispatched an emissary to urge Kim to surrender. Kim rejected the offer and executed the envoy upon arrival.

Anticipating a full-scale assault, Kim implemented additional defensive measures. Scouts were stationed on five surrounding peaks and instructed to sound flutes as an alert signal upon detecting enemy movements. On the morning of the 25th day of the month, flutes were heard from multiple directions, signaling the commencement of the battle. Heavy fighting ensued and lasted until nightfall. That night, Japanese troops utilized the cover of darkness to infiltrate Yŏngwŏn Fortress, resulting in its eventual capture. Amid the ensuing chaos, a military officer named O Hang (오항; 吳杭) attempted to evacuate with Kim, who declined to retreat and continued to resist.

=== Death ===
In the final moments of the siege, Kim Chegap donned his official court robe over his armor, performed a ritual prostration facing north, and resumed combat while seated, continuing to fire arrows at the attacking forces. Despite sustaining arrow wounds to the back and chest, he remained at his position and continued to resist. He was ultimately taken captive by Japanese forces and killed shortly thereafter, having refused to surrender. His son, Kim Sibaek (김시백; 金時伯), was also killed in combat. His wife, a lady of the Jeonju Yi clan, died by suicide, throwing herself from the fortress wall.
