= Godalsa =

Temple in Yeoju County, Gyeonggi Province of South Korea

Coordinates: 37.3908°N 127.6583°E

Godalsa or Godal Temple (Korean: 고달사; Hanja: 高達寺) is an old temple located in Yeoju County, Gyeonggi Province of South Korea. The site of the temple is registered as historic spot no. 382.

The temple was built in 764 under the reign of 35th king of Unified Silla, Gyeongdeok of Silla. In early years of Goryeo, the temple was under the protection of the powerful, including the absolute king, Gwangjong of Goryeo. Later, however, the temple was left behind, unmentioned in contemporary records. It is presumed that the temple controlled almost the whole area of the village around 10th century.

The site is significantly important, since three or more national treasures reside here. It is currently under restoration.

== Legend ==
It is said the stonemason named Godal completed construction of the temple. During work, he dedicated himself to finalize his project by praying, without knowing the deaths of his family. After completion, he decided to devote himself to Buddhism and become the monk. Later, he was seated as the great Buddhist monk. The name of the temple comes from here.

== Excavation ==
Roof tile inscribed as "Godal temple" and several relics were found in 1998. These relics were found around the stupa. Additionally, since the temple was made of wood, it was critical to find the foundation. From this project, it is said to be seemingly 7 sites of old buildings and 2 walls.

== National Treasure ==
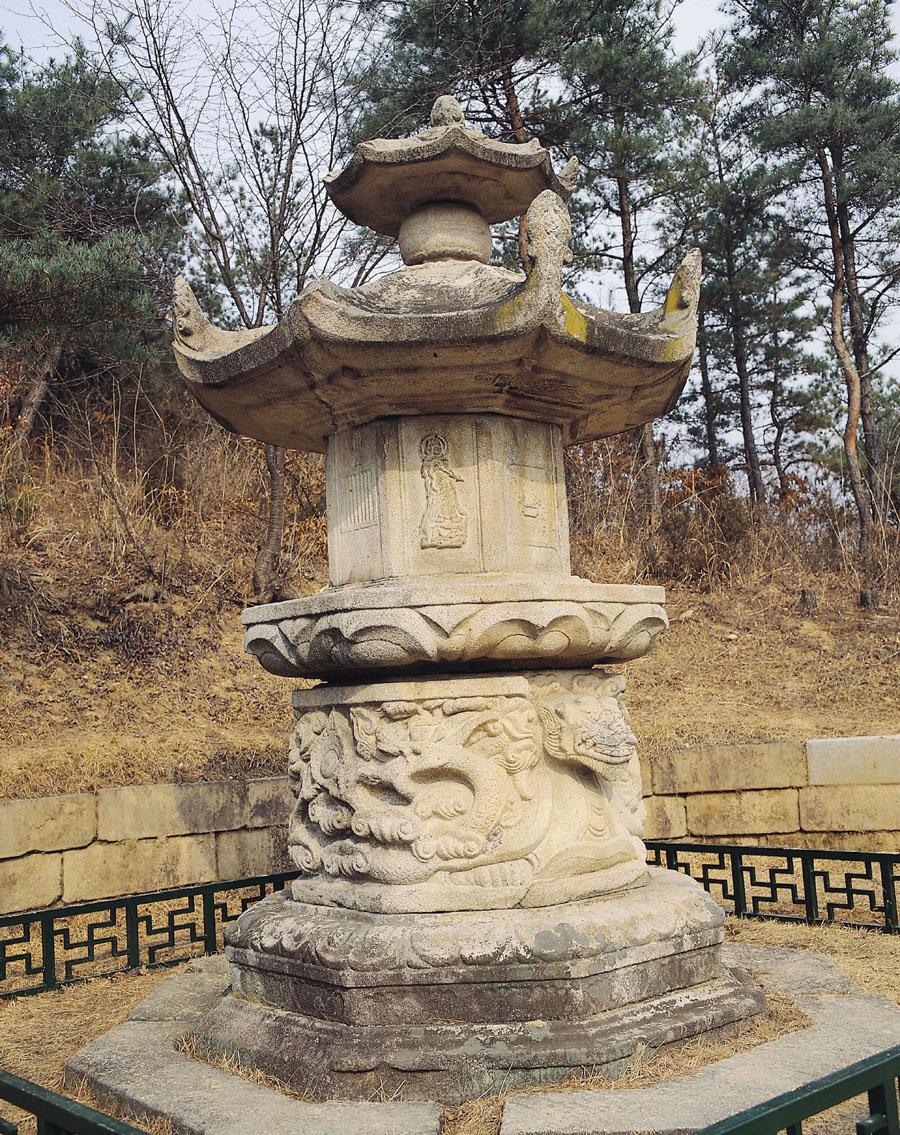
Side view of the stupa

The Godalsaji Stupa was nominated as 4th National Treasure of Korea in 1962 December 20. The accorded stupa is a conventional octagonal shape where cultural heritage of Shinra lies within. Godal temple is well known but many tourists fail to acknowledge presence of the following National Treasure. With a height of 3.4m, the stupa consists of several layers of granite. At the bottom lies the lowest stone, which maintain balance, and above stands the lower, middle and upper stones. The lower stone has eight sides with a petal pattern decoration. The middle stone has four dragons and verse surrounding a turtle.

Its significance lies in the refined architecture and time period the stupa was built which seems to be around 10th century at the beginning of the Goryeo dynasty.
