= Yun Inham =

Korean scholar-official (1531–1597)

- Born: 17th day, 4th month of 1531
- Died: 10th day, 12th month of 1597
- Burial place: Tomb of Yun Inham; Yeoncheon, South Korea
- Citizenship: Joseon
- Occupation: Literati official
- Years active: 1555-1597
- Known for: Imjin War; Second Siege of Gyeongju

Korean name
- Hangul: 윤인함
- Hanja: 尹仁涵
- RR: Yun Inham
- MR: Yun Inham

Art name
- Hangul: 죽재, 죽당
- Hanja: 竹齋, 竹堂
- RR: Jukjae, Jukdang
- MR: Chukchae, Chuktang

Courtesy name
- Hangul: 양숙
- Hanja: 養叔
- RR: Yangsuk
- MR: Yangsuk

Yun Inham (Korean: 윤인함; Hanja: 尹仁涵; 17th day, 4th month of 1531 – 10th day, 12th month of 1597) was a Korean scholar-official and military leader of the mid-Joseon period. Born in 1531, Yun passed the triennial state civil service examination in 1555 and in 1558 was appointed Editorial Examiner at the Office of Royal Decrees. He later served in a number of official posts and diplomatic missions, eventually attaining the position of Mayor of Gyeongju.

At the outbreak of the Imjin War, Yun Inham was soon dismissed due to his age and frailty and designated Fugitive Apprehension Commander. Yun transferred military authority to Pak Ŭijang while stationing himself at Seocheon. After the fall of Gyeongju Fortress, he withdrew to Kigye, where he rallied refugees and stragglers to form a force of over one thousand men. Recognizing his efforts, the royal court reinstated him as Mayor of Gyeongju, and Yun continued to support local militia leaders.

In the same year, righteous armies in Left Gyeongsang Province convened near the Munch'ŏn River. On the 9th day of the 6th month, at Munch'ŏn, with Yun as their central figure, the Munch'ŏn Alliance was established. Yun organized the command structure and assigned leaders to strategic roles. In the 8th month, Joseon forces advanced on Gyeongju, with Yun positioned to the north during the siege. Although the first attempt to recapture the fortress failed, a second assault in the 9th month succeeded.

In 1593, Yun was appointed Provincial Governor of Chungcheong, though he was soon reassigned as Third Minister of Taxation. In 1595, he was promoted to the rank of Grand Master for Excellent Virtue. The following year, he became Vice Minister of Justice. During the Chŏngyu War in 1597, he served as Reception Commissioner, traveling to Pyongyang to receive Ming generals, where he fell ill and died in 1597.

== Early life ==
Yun Inham was born on the 17th day of the 4th month in 1531. His paternal lineage was the Papyeong Yun clan. He was the son of Yun Ŭnggyu (윤응규; 尹應奎), who served as Vice Director (첨정; 僉正), and his mother was Lady Yi of the Jeonui Yi clan, the daughter of Yi Sudong (이수동; 李壽童). From an early age, Yun was noted for his intelligence, and it is recorded that he was able to write at the age of six. In 1552, at twenty-two, he passed the Literary Licentiate Examination (진사시; 進士試), and in 1555, he passed the triennial state civil service examination (식년시; 式年試) with third-tier honors (병과; 丙科), whereupon he was appointed to the position of Probationary Proofreader (권지정자; 權知正字) at the Office of Diplomatic Correspondence (승문원; 承文院).

== Career before the Imjin War ==
=== Early career ===
In the 1st month of 1558, Yun Inham was appointed Editorial Examiner (검열; 檢閱) at the Office of Royal Decrees (예문관; 藝文館). In the 7th month of the same year, he was promoted to Awaiting-order Editor (대교; 待敎). The following year, he advanced to the position of Proofreader at the Office of Special Advisors, and in the 5th month of 1560 was appointed First Copist (저작; 著作) at the same institution. Later that year, in the 10th month, he became Erudite (박사; 博士), and in the 12th month, was promoted to Deputy Compiler (부수찬; 副修撰), concurrently serving as Drafter of Royal Edicts. In the 6th month of 1561, he was transferred to the Ministry of War (병조; 兵曹) as Assistant Section Chief (좌랑; 佐郎), and in the following month assumed the same post at the Ministry of Personnel (이조; 吏曹). Thereafter, he was dispatched to Ming China as Document Officer (서장관; 書狀官).

=== Dismissal ===
After returning from Ming China, Yun Inham was appointed as Section Chief (정랑; 正郎) in the Ministry of Personnel on the 26th day of the 3rd month in 1563, thereby assuming responsibility for matters of personnel administration. At the time, Yi Ryang, who had consolidated powers through the favor of King Myeongjong as maternal uncle of Queen Insun, sought to advance his faction into censorial posts by exercising control over personnel appointments. Within this context, Yi induced Yun Inham to recommend his son Yi Chŏngbin for the position of Assistant Section Chief in the Ministry of Personnel, an appointment that was made on the 12th day of the 7th month.

Yi subsequently sought to impeach Ki Taesŭng, Yun Kŭnsu, and others, but was countered by Ki Taehang, then Assistant Deputy Director (부제학; 副提學) at the Office of Special Advisors. He even attempted to remove his own nephew Sim Ŭigyŏm. This provoked opposition from the influential in-law faction led by Sim Kang, Sim Ŭigyŏm's father. King Myeongjong, wary of Yi Ryang's excessive power, sanctioned his impeachment and ordered his exile to Kanggye in the 8th month of 1563. Following Yi's downfall, his associates were likewise punished. Yun Inham was dismissed from office on the 9th day of the 10th month in 1563, charged with facilitating Yi Chŏngbin's recommendation to the Ministry of Personnel and with divulging confidential resolutions at censorial offices to colleagues, including his brother-in-law Chŏng Yunhŭi (정윤희; 丁胤禧).

=== Reinstatement ===
Yun Inham was reinstated in 1574 on the grounds that his prior dismissal had not concerned matters of state. He was subsequently appointed Recorder (전적; 典籍) at the Royal Confucian Academy and later served as Vice Director at the Office of the Royal Genealogy (종부시; 宗簿寺). Seeking an outside post in order to attend to his father, he was assigned as Magistrate of P'ungdŏk, and was later transferred to Yangju. Following his father's death in 1576, he resigned from office to observe mourning period and returned to service in 1578 as Chief Director (정; 正) at the Office of the Royal Stables (사복시; 司僕寺). In 1581 he transferred to the same post at the Office for Royal Sacrifices (봉상시; 奉常寺) before assuming the magistracy of Hwangju. In the 11th month of 1584, he was dispatched to Beijing as a member of the Winter Solstice Mission (동지사; 冬至使) to extend seasonal felicitations to the Ming court. After his return, he served successively as Magistrate of Namwon and Seonsan, later advancing to Third Minister (참의; 參議) of Taxation before being appointed Mayor of Gyeongju.

== Imjin War ==
=== Outbreak of the Imjin War ===
Yun Inham held office as Mayor of Gyeongju at the outbreak of the Imjin War on the 14th day of the 4th month in 1592. Following the Japanese landing at Busan, Yun undertook symbolic and practical measures to safeguard the city's cultural and political heritage, while Executive Assistant to Magistrate (판관; 判官) Pak Ŭijang proceeded to Dongnae in accordance with the initial mobilization procedures. He removed the spirit tablets from the local Confucian school to a secure location and conducted rites at the tomb of Kim Yusin, thereby reaffirming communal resolve against foreign aggression. On the 16th day, he directed the officials Chŏng Sasŏng (정사성; 鄭士誠) and Hong Yŏyul (홍여율; 洪汝栗) to evacuate to safety the royal portrait of King Taejo housed in the hall Chipkyŏngjŏn.

The following day, upon receipt of intelligence concerning the Japanese advance, the central court, judging Yun's advanced age and physical weakness to be liabilities in the face of imminent crisis, dismissed him and appointed Pyŏn Ŭngsŏng as his successor in the mayoralty. In the wake of this decision, the provincial governor, Kim Su sought to designate Yun as Fugitive Apprehension Commander (포망장; 捕亡將). When Pak Ŭijang subsequently returned to Gyeongju, Yun transferred to him command authority along with some 500 troops under the command of Yi Kak. Thereafter withdrew from the fortress to station himself at Seocheon River in order to carry out his duties as Fugitive Apprehension Commander.

On the 21st day of 4th month in 1592, following the fall of Gyeongju Fortress, Yun Inham withdrew to Kigye, a mountainous district situated north of the fortress. The area was home to the Kigye Granary, which ensured access to provisions and weaponry and further served as a strategic base for rallying displaced soldiers and civilians who had sought refuge in the surrounding terrain. From among these refugees, Yun succeeded in organizing a force of more than one thousand men, thereby consolidating his military capacity. Meanwhile, the royal court absolved him of culpability for the loss of Gyeongju and reinstated him to his former position as Magistrate of the city. Resuming his office, Yun entrusted Kim Ho, a militia leader, with the defense of the fortress's northwestern approaches, while continuing to encourage and support other militia commanders in their resistance.

=== Munch'ŏn Alliance ===
With the arrival of the royal proclamation from Uiju and the mobilization edict issued by Commissioner Kim Sŏngil, the movement of righteous armies in Left Gyeongsang Province began to gain momentum. Within this context, the militias circulated a clandestine communiqué asserting that they had devised a strategy to repel the Japanese, which spurred assemblies at Wŏlsŏng, near the Munch'ŏn River in Gyeongju. On the 28th day of the 5th month, Yi Ŏnch'un (이언춘; 李彥春) arrived at Wŏlsŏng, where Yun Inham also came forward to encourage the gathered militias. The following day, Yi Kyesu (이계수; 李繼秀), accompanied by more than ten righteous men, joined the cause; by the 5th day of the 6th month, additional contingents from Ulsan, Yeongcheon, Yeonil, and other towns had assembled. On the 7th day of the 6th month, with the arrival of government troops under the command of Pak Ŭijang, the combined force had grown to over 4,200 men.

On the 9th day of the 6th month, the militias gathered at Munch'ŏn, with Magistrate Yun Inham at their center, established the Munch'ŏn Alliance to unify the righteous armies of Left Gyeongsang Province to resolve upon the recapture of Gyeongju Fortress. As a symbolic oath, they slaughtered an animal and partook of its blood; to formalize their commitment, they drafted an alliance document. Through this act, the participants pledged that government forces and militias would stand together in a common front against the Japanese. In his capacity as magistrate, Yun encouraged the coalition and organized the command hierarchy, directing Yi Kŭkpok (이극복; 李克福) to participate in devising and implementing military plans, while appointing Pak In'guk (박인국; 朴仁國), Kim Sŏkkyŏn (김석견; 金石堅), and Hwang Hŭian as regional commanders.

Following the recapture of Yeongcheon Fortress on 27th day of the 7th month in 1592, the Joseon forces, in accordance with the resolution of the Munch'ŏn Alliance, concentrated their efforts on the recovering Gyeongju Fortress. Provincial Military Commander (병마절도사; 兵馬節度使) of Left Gyeongsang, Pak Chin, assembled troops at Angang, joined also by righteous armies who had taken part in the Munch'ŏn Alliance. On the 21st day of the 8th month, the Joseon army reached Gyeongju Fortress and encircled it on three sides, with Yun Inham positioned to the north. The attackers launched an assault employing incendiary tactics and initially gained the upper hand. However, the arrival of Japanese reinforcements shifted the balance, and the Joseon forces were ultimately defeated and forced to withdraw. Following the subsequent second attempt on the 7th day of the 9th month, led by Pak Ŭijang, the fortress was recaptured. During this attempt, Yun Inham, who had been stationed at Kigye, entrusted the task of seizing the fortress to Pak Ŭijang.

=== Final years ===
In 1593, Yun Inham was appointed Provincial Governor of Chungcheong upon the recommendation of Yun Tusu. However, when the Border Defense Council advised his dismissal on account of his advanced age, he was relieved of the governorship and reassigned as a Third Minister of Taxation. In 1595, in recognition of his meritorious service at Gyeongju, he was promoted to the senior second rank of the Grand Master for Excellent Virtue (가선대부; 嘉善大夫) and appointed Chief Judge (판결사; 判決事) of the Bureau of Slaves (장례원; 掌禮院). The following year, in 1596, he was appointed Vice Minister (참판; 參判) of Justice (형조; 刑曹).

During the outbreak of the Chŏngyu War, Yun concurrently held the post of Reception Commissioner (영접사; 迎接使) and traveled to Pyongyang to welcome Ming generals. However, he fell ill during the mission and died in his official residence on the 10th day of the 12th month in 1597 at the age of 67.
