= Siege of Yeongwon =

The Siege of Yeongwon Castle
- Part of Seven-Year War
| Date | August 23-25th, 1592(according to Lunar calendar) |
| Location | Wonju, Gangwon 37°18′33″N 128°02′19″E |
| Result | Japanese victory |

Belligerents
| Japanese Fourth Division | Korean Regular Army |

Commanders and leaders
| Ito Suketaka | Kim Chegap † |

Strength
| At least 3,000 men | 4,000 men (Several hundred soldiers, the rest civilians) |

Casualties and losses
| Around 1,500 | Unknown but heavy |
- Location within South Korea

The siege of Yeongwon Castle took place in 1592 during the Japanese invasions of Korea. Korean troops resisting the Japanese occupation came under siege in the fortress at Yeongwon, in Wonju. The Japanese forces broke into the castle during the night and defeated the Korean garrison.

== Background ==
Uprisings against the Japanese occupation of northern Kangwon were threatening Seoul itself, so the Japanese commander Ito Suketaka marched against the rebels' main base.

The governor Kim Chegap hastily collected all the soldiers that could be found together with arms and munitions, and went to the almost impregnable fortress of Yeongwon.

The natural defenses of this place were unexcelled by any in Korea. On three sides, the approach was almost precipitous and a handful of men could hold an army at bay. Here the governor collected provisions in abundance and dug a wall. Stones were piled on the top of the wall to be thrown upon anyone who should attempt to scale the height.

Japanese soldiers recognised the strength of the position and tried to get the governor to surrender without a struggle. A letter was sent up the steep slope and handed over the wall. It is said "You are doomed. Even if you hold out for two months you will then be taken. You must come out and surrender at once" The only answer was the headless trunk of the Japanese messenger, rolled down the precipice in front of the eyes of the invading army. The next day the assault began.

== The siege ==
The besiegers swarmed up the sides of the slope. The garrison though only 4,000 strong found no difficulty in driving them back.

== The final assault ==
That night, the Koreans wearied by the labors of the day and deeming it impossible that the Japanese should try to attack at night up those steep slopes, failed to set a guard; and in the early morning of the following day, before dawn, a little band of Japanese soldiers worked its way up the face of the precipice until they reached the base of the wall. A few stones were displaced until a small aperture was made and the little band effected an entrance. They rushed into the camp with a terrific yell cutting down the half-wakened and wholly terrified garrison. The gates were thrown open and in an hour the victory was complete, catching the leader of the garrison asleep in his bed. Governor Kim Chegap who refused to do obeisance, was cut down. Ishida Mitsunari, one of Hideyoshi's three commissioners stationed in Seoul, was overjoyed at the news and asked Ito to send him the governor's head.

== See also ==
- Hideyoshi's invasions of Korea – 1592–1598 Japanese invasions of Korea
- Military history of Japan
- Military history of Korea
