= Kwŏn Tumun =

Korean scholar-official (1543–1592)

- 권두문
- Born: 1543; Yeongju, Joseon
- Died: 1617 (aged 73–74); Yeongju, Joseon
- Burial place: Bonghwa, South Korea
- Military career
- Allegiance: Joseon
- Conflicts: Imjin War; Battle of Pyeongchang

Korean name
- Hangul: 권두문
- Hanja: 權斗文
- RR: Gwon Dumun
- MR: Kwŏn Tumun

Art name
- Hangul: 남천
- Hanja: 南川
- RR: Namcheon
- MR: Namch'ŏn

Courtesy name
- Hangul: 경앙
- Hanja: 景仰
- RR: Gyeongang
- MR: Kyŏngang

Kwŏn Tumun (Korean: 권두문; Hanja: 權斗文; 1543 – 1617) was a Korean scholar-official and military leader of the mid-Joseon period. Born in 1543 in Yeongju, he passed the state civil service examination in 1572 and subsequently served in various posts, including Proofreader at the Office of Printing Books, Inspector at the Office of the Inspector-General, Junior Official in the Ministry of Justice, and Magistrate of Cheongdo.

At the outbreak of the Imjin War in 1592, Kwŏn was serving as Magistrate of Pyeongchang. In response to the Japanese invasion, he established a defensive position at Ŭngam Cave. Despite organizing a local resistance, he and his son, Kwŏn Chu, were ultimately captured. During captivity, he collected intelligence and covertly relayed it to government forces. He later escaped from confinement in Wonju and returned to Yeongju via Pyeongchang. His experience in captivity was recorded in the Hoguilnok.

In 1593, Kwŏn traveled to the temporary royal court in Haeju to directly report to King Seonjo on his ordeal and to submit policy recommendations concerning wartime governance. In recognition of his efforts, he was appointed Registrar of the Office of Royal Ceremonies and later accompanied the royal court on its return to the capital. Over the ensuing years, he held a number of posts including Director of the Office of Supply and Finance, Magistrate of Kansŏng, Director of the Office of Royal Household Goods, and Left Master of Ceremonies of the Office for National Ritual.

Due to chronic illness sustained during the war, Kwŏn eventually retired from official service. In his later years, he returned to his hometown of Yeongju, where he organized the Kurohoe with Kim Rŭk, devoting himself to poetry, wine, and scholarly pursuits. He died in 1617.

In recognition of his service in accompanying King Seonjo, Kwŏn was posthumously promoted to Chief Minister of the Sŭngjŏngwŏn and also commemorated with enshrinement at Kuho Seowon in Yeongju.

== Early life and career ==
Kwŏn Tumun was born in 1543 to Kwŏn Yunyŏn (권유년; 權有年) and a lady of the Andong Kwŏn clan in Yeongju. He studied under Pak Sŭngim and passed the Ch'undangdae special civil service examination (춘당대시; 春塘臺試) in 1572, with third-tier honors (병과; 丙科), thereby entering government service.

His first official post was as Proofreader (교검; 校檢) at the Office of Printing Books (교서관; 校書館), followed by a position as Inspector (감찰; 監察) at the Office of the Inspector-General (Sahŏnbu). He subsequently served as Magistrate of Ch'irwŏn County.

In 1585, Kwŏn was appointed Records Officer (전적; 典籍) at the Sungkyunkwan, and the following year, he became Junior Official (정랑; 正郞) in the Ministry of Justice. Although personnel officials recommended him for appointments within the capital—such as the Sahŏnbu or the Office of the Censor-General (Saganwŏn)—Kwŏn requested a provincial assignment in order to care for his aging parents. He was consequently appointed Magistrate of Cheongdo.

In 1589, he was reinstated as Junior Official in the Ministry of Justice and named Magistrate of Kobu County. However, he once again declined the post, citing filial obligations. Later that year, following the death of his father, he resigned from office.

== Imjin War ==
In 3rd month of 1592, Kwŏn Tumun was appointed Magistrate of Pyeongchang and concurrently served as Magistrate of Yeongwol. Following the outbreak of the Imjin War in 4th month and the arrival of reports regarding the Japanese invasion, he initially resolved to accompany the royal court and join King Seonjo. However, at the earnest request of local elders, who urged him to remain and fulfill his responsibilities as a regional official, he reversed his decision and remained in Pyeongchang to coordinate local defense efforts.

Kwŏn selected Ŭngam Cave (응암굴; 鷹巖窟), a site located atop steep cliffs within the county, as the defensive stronghold and initiated fortification measures. He appointed former Attendant Official (봉사; 奉事), Chi Saham (지사함; 智士涵), as commander, raised a local militia, constructed palisades, and stockpiled provisions in preparation for a potential siege. However, prior to the war, the region had already experienced significant depopulation and devastation, leaving him with a force of approximate one hundred soldiers. The troops were poorly trained, making it difficult to achieve effective combat readiness.

=== Battle of Pyeongchang ===
On 7th day, 8th month of 1592, as the Japanese Fourth Division under Mōri Katsunobu advanced into the Pyeongchang region, Magistrate Kwŏn Tumun relocated to Ŭngam Cave to organize a defensive position. Making use of the cave's natural topography, he sheltered civilians in the lower chambers while deploying government troops in the upper sections to establish a fortified arrangement.

On 8th and 9th day of 8th month, Kwŏn ordered his troops to ambush the approaching Japanese forces. However, the operation was not executed, as the soldiers were reportedly immobilized by fear. On the following day, their failure to retrieve boats and ladders left behind visible traces of their presence. Additionally, Chi Taesŏng fired an arrow at a Japanese soldier near the cave entrance, disobeying Kwŏn's explicit order to wait until the soldier began climbing. This act revealed the cave's location and compromised their concealment.

On 11th day, 8th month of 1592, Japanese forces launched an assault on Ŭngam Cave. Kwŏn Tumun organized resistance by directing the defenders to roll stones and fire arrows as the attackers scaled the cliffs. Despite their efforts, the defenders were significantly outnumbered. As the situation deteriorated, Kwŏn reportedly attempted to take his own life, but was dissuaded by his son, Kwŏn Chu (권주; 權𪐴). Both were ultimately captured by Japanese forces. During the assault, Kwŏn's wife, lady of Kang clan, chose not to be taken captive and died by suicide, reportedly throwing herself from a cliff.

=== Captivity ===
Kwŏn Tumun remained in captivity for 21 days, from 11th day of 8th month to 2nd day of 9th month in 1592. As an act of continued resistance, he attempted suicide on two occasions—on 13th and 14th days of 8th month—but was restrained by his attendant Ko Ŏnyŏng (고언영; 高彦英) and his son, Kwŏn Chu. Following the movements of the Japanese forces, Kwŏn was taken through Yaksu (약수; 藥水) and arrived in Yeongwol on 17th day of 8th month.

Two days later, on 19th day, the brothers Ko Chongwŏn (고종원; 高宗遠) and Ko Chonggil (고종길; 高宗吉)—siblings of Ko Chonggyŏng (고종경; 高宗慶), a local righteous army leader executed on Kwŏn's orders under the command of Provincial Governor Yu Yŏnggil—were also brought in as captives. Upon encountering them, Kwŏn expressed remorse and offered an apology for his prior role in the execution of Ko Chonggyŏng.

After passing through Jecheon, Kwŏn Tumun arrived in Wonju on 24th day of 8th month and was confined to the library building of the Wonju government office. While in confinement, he began preparations for escape, securing provisions and examining possible routes. On 29th day of 8th month, he composed a written memorandum containing military intelligence, which he dispatched to the Recruitment Commissioner (호소사; 號召使), Provincial Governor (관찰사; 觀察使), and the Auxiliary Defense Commander (조방장; 助防將) of Kangwŏn Province. In this document, he argued that Japanese numerical superiority had been overstated and identified vulnerabilities in their formation, recommending a surprise night assault as a viable strategy to overturn the unfavorable situation.

On the night of 2nd day, 9th month of 1592, taking advantage of thunder and heavy rainfall that loosened Japanese vigilance, Kwŏn Tumun and his son, Kwŏn Chu, successfully escaped captivity. By 10th day of 9th month, Kwŏn had crossed Chiaksan and returned to Pyeongchang, only to learn that he had already been dismissed from his post as Magistrate. He departed for his hometown in Yeongju.

Kwŏn Tumun recorded the entire ordeal from Japanse invasion in Pyeongchang on 7th day of 8th month to captivity and returning home on 13th day of 9th month in a first-hand narrative titled Hoguilnok ("Diary at the Tiger’s Mouth", 호구일록; 虎口日錄).

=== After escapement ===
Upon his return to Yeongju, Kwŏn served under Kim Rŭk, the Regional Inspector (안집사; 安集使) of Yeongnam, overseeing the procurement and management of military provisions. In 9th month of 1593, he traveled to the royal court in temporary exile at Haeju, where he submitted a report to King Seonjo detailing his experiences in captivity and subsequent escape. During this audience, he also presented a set of policy proposals aimed at alleviating wartime suffering, advocating for the prompt dispatch of provincial officials and inspectors to assess regional conditions and restore public order. The king approved his recommendations and appointed him Registrar (주부; 主簿) of the Office of Royal Ceremonies (봉상시; 奉常寺).

Later that autumn, Kwŏn accompanied the royal court on its return to the capital, Hansŏng. He was subsequently appointed Vice Director (첨정; 僉正) of the Office of Military Provisions (군자감; 軍資監), and later served as Magistrate of Yecheon.

== Final years ==
In 1594, Kwŏn Tumun resigned from his government service following the death of his mother. Although he was subsequently appointed to a series of magistrate posts in Jinsan, Yeongcheon, and Geumsan between 1599 and 1600, he declined to assume office, stating that his previous rationale for serving in provincial posts—filial obligations—was no longer applicable.

In 1602, Kwŏn returned to central government service as Chief Director (정; 正) of the Office of Supply and Finance (사섬시; 司贍寺). In 7th month of the same year, he was appointed Magistrate of Kansŏng and assumed the post. In 1605, he was successively appointed Chief Director of the Office of Royal Household Goods (내자시; 內資寺) and Left Master of Ceremonies (좌통례; 左通禮) of the Office for National Ritual (통례원; 通禮院).

Due to chronic rheumarthritis sustained during the Imjin War, Kwŏn experienced significant mobility impairments. On one occasion, he collapsed to the ground before King Seonjo, which elicited criticism from officials of the Censorate (대간; 臺諫). Although the king defended him in light of his condition, Kwŏn voluntarily submitted his resignation, citing ill health.

=== Death ===
Following his retirement from public office, he returned to his native Yeongju. There, he established the Kurohoe ("Society of the Nine Elders", 구로회; 九老會) with contemporaries such as Kim Rŭk, dedicating himself to poetry, conviviality, and the study of classical texts. He died in 1617 and was buried in Bonghwa County.
