= Gidan (architectural style) =

Traditional Korean architecture style

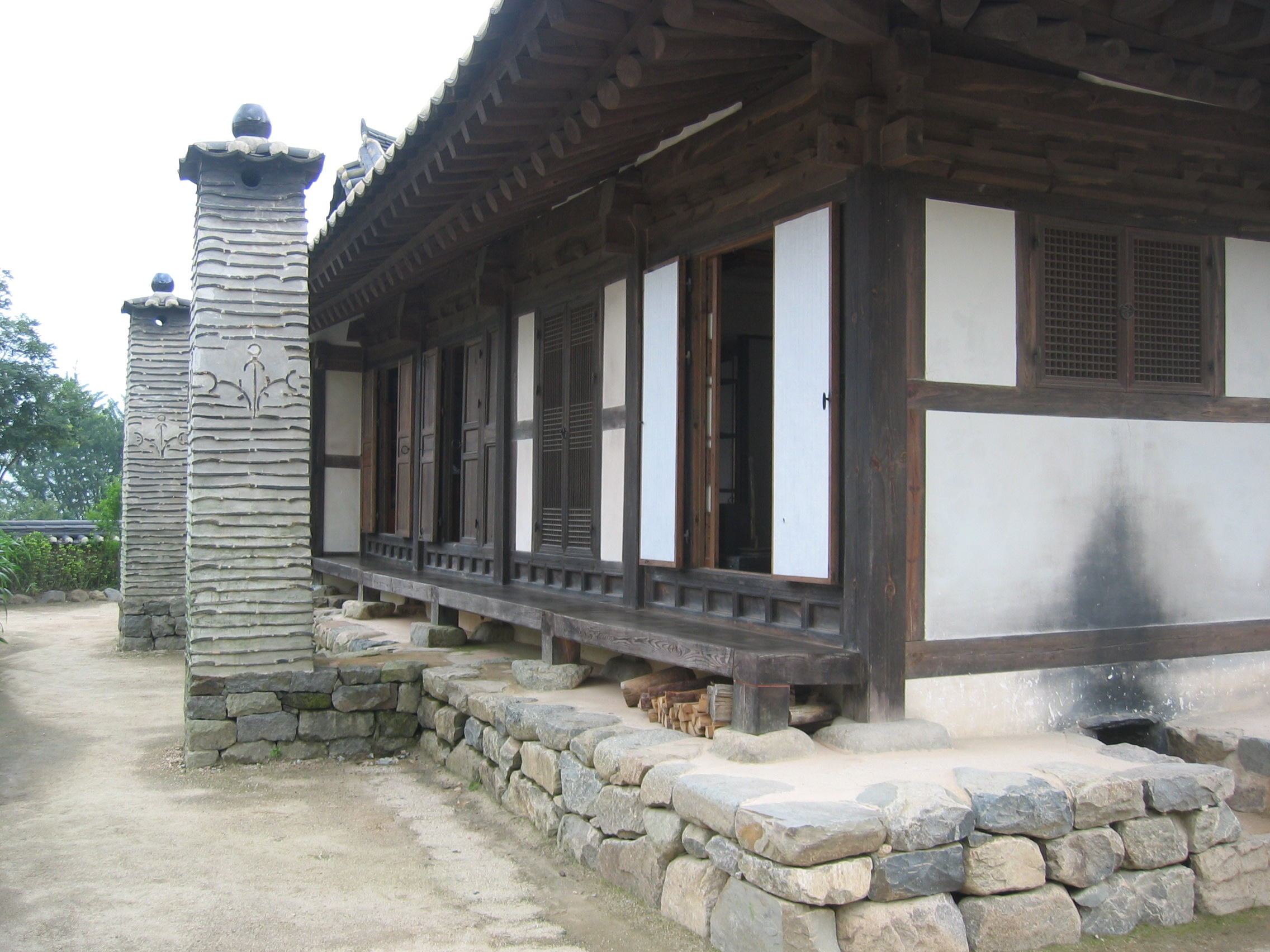
Stone gidan (석축기단)

Gidan (Korean: 기단; Hanja: 基壇) is an architectural style of Korea, built by leveling the site and then building a platform one level higher than the site. It is mainly used in Hanok.

== Purpose ==
The main purposes of making a Gidan are as follows:

- To receive the load of the building transmitted from each cornerstone and evenly transmit it to the ground
- To protect the building from rainwater and groundwater
- To make the building appear taller than the site, giving it a sense of grandeur and dignity

== History ==
Gidan has been distinctly constructed since the Three Kingdoms of Korea. It became one of the most basic components of Korean architecture until the Joseon.

Most buildings in Korea, including houses, temples, and palaces, are built on a single-story foundation, while the main halls of palaces are built on a multi-story foundation. Geunjeongjeon, Injeongjeon, and Myeongjeongjeon were built on two stories wider than the floor of the building, and then another story was built around the floor of the building.
