= Silleuksa =

Korean Buddhist temple in Gyeonggi Province

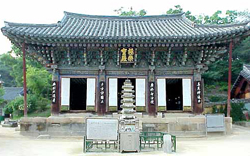
- Shilleuksa

- Location within South Korea

Religion
- Affiliation: Buddhism

Location
- Location: 282 Cheonsong-dong, Yeoju-si, Gyeonggi-do
- State: Yeoju in Gyeonggi Province
- Country: South Korea
- Coordinates: 37°17′51″N 127°39′41″E

Korean name
- Hangul: 신륵사
- Hanja: 神勒寺
- RR: Silleuksa
- MR: Sillŭksa

Shilleuksa (also written as Silleuksa and Shilleuk-sa) is a Korean Buddhist temple situated against a low hill on the north side of the river Namhan, three kilometers east of Yeoju in Gyeonggi Province, approximately one-hour southeast of Seoul. The only riverside temple in South Korea, Shilleuksa is a sacred pilgrimage site and a repository of seven Treasures. A 500-year-old aromatic juniper tree and a 600-year-old ginkgo tree stand on the temple grounds.

Founded circa 580 by Silla dynasty monk Wonhyo, Shilleuksa was enlarged, burned, and rededicated several times. Shilleuksa was made a prayer sanctuary to the royal mausoleum of King Sejong the Great in 1469 (he moved from Seoul that year), during the reign of King Seongjong. Often referred to as the "wall temple" because of an impressive brick pagoda towering high above, Shilleuksa is small by standard measure.

== Treasures ==
A six-tier brick pagoda overlooks the river, one of a handful of brick pagodas in the country (T. #226). Nearby is a Silla dynasty memorial stone stela (T. #230) whose inscription concerns a library that once stood on the premises for the preservation of wood printing blocks of the sutras. In the center courtyard is a seven-tier marble pagoda (T. #225) from the early Joseon period. Relief carvings of dragons, lotus, and wave patterns around its base are all done delicately, with consummate skill. To the side of the main hall is Josadong, a small, rather undistinguished building (T. #180). This hall enshrines the portraits of important monks of the Goryeo dynasty. To the rear of the building and up a hill are an octagonal gray marble lantern (T. #231) indicative of the Goryeo period, a bell-shaped sari budo of monk Naong (T. #228), and a stone stela (T. #229)

== Three portraits in Josadong ==
Josadong is the oldest building at Shilleuk-sa. Built to pay tribute to Buddhist priests Naong (c. 1320–1376), Muhak (c. 1327–1405), and Jigong (d. 1363), it enshrines their portraits.

Ordained at the age of 20, master Naong spent ten years in China. He became a celebrated Zen master whose teaching methods integrated chanting, for him, a state of mind in which obtrusive thinking became absent. He purportedly planted the temple's 600-year-old ginkgo tree.

Master Muhak was an advisor to Yi Seong-gye, who became King Taejo, the founder of the Joseon dynasty. It is thought that Muhak's reputation as a geomancer influenced Yi's decision to move the capital from Gaeseong to Hanyang (present-day Seoul).

Arriving in Korea circa 1328, master Jigong was an Indian monk whose Sanskrit name was Dhyānabhadra. Following his death in China, his remains were returned to the temple.

== Photo gallery ==
Gray lantern, stone stela, and bell-shaped sari budo of Naong

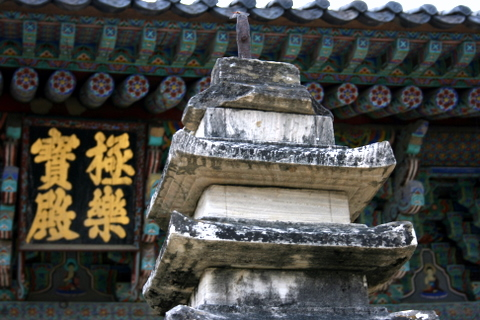
Multi-story marble stone pagoda

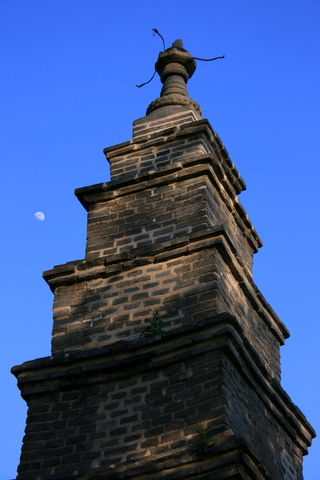
Seven-tier brick pagoda, one of a handful of brick pagodas in the country

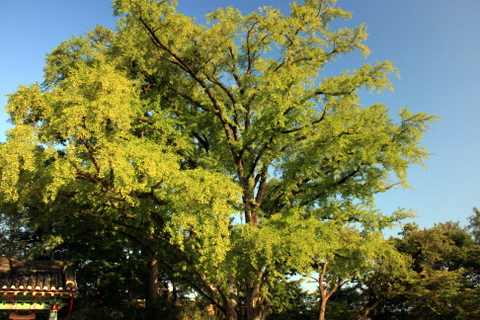
Six-hundred-year-old ginkgo tree

== See also ==
- Korean Buddhist temples
- Korean Buddhism
