= Namhan River =

River in South Korea

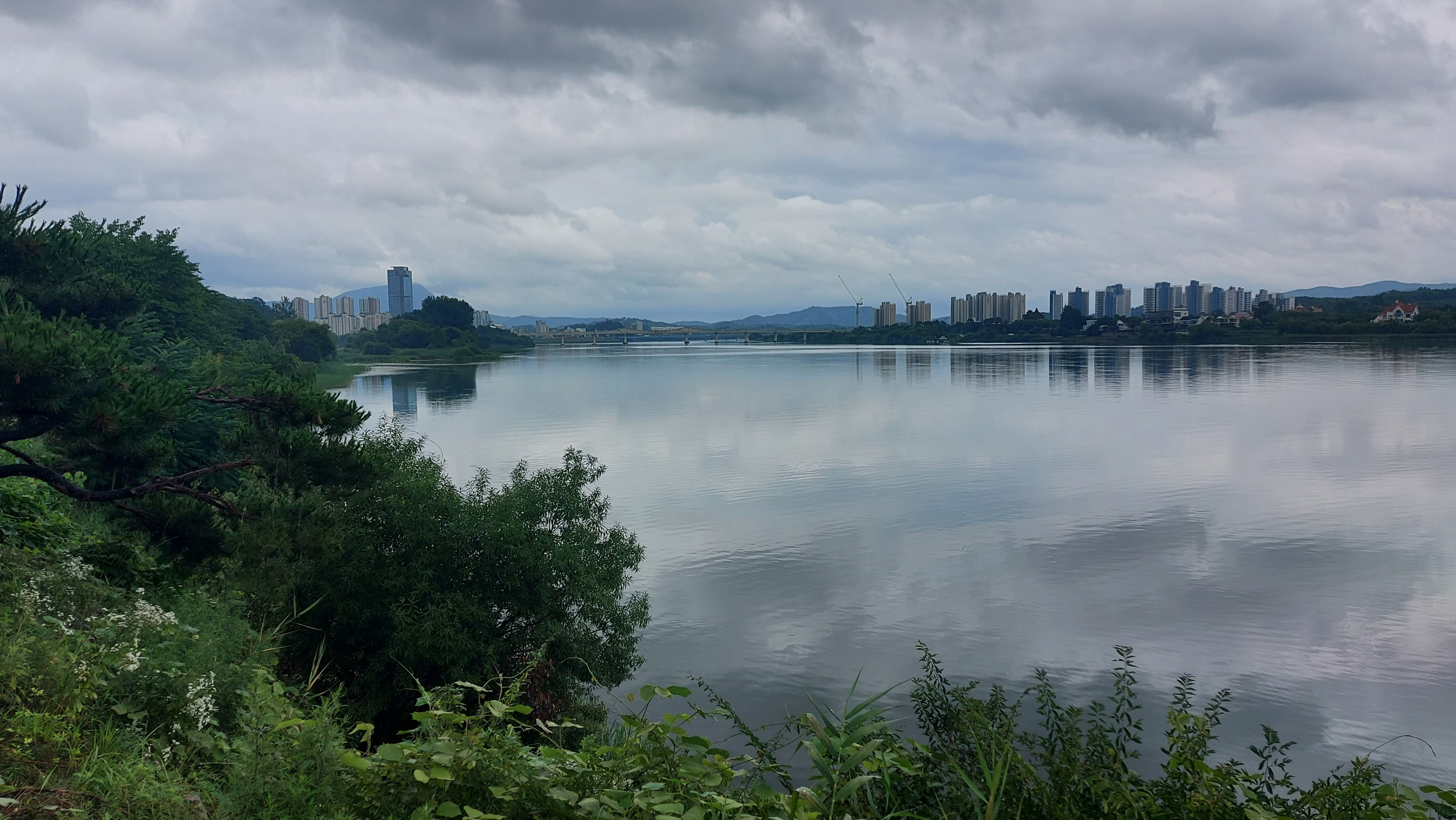
- Namhan River in Yangpyeong County

Location
- Country: South Korea

Physical characteristics
- Source
  - location: Yeongwol
  - coordinates: 37°10′17″N 128°28′04″E
- Mouth
  - location: Han River
  - coordinates: 48°38′37″N 37°31′39″E
- Length: 359 km (223 mi)
- Basin size: 12,347 km^{2} (4,767 sq mi)

Korean name
- Hangul: 남한강
- Hanja: 南漢江
- RR: Namhangang
- MR: Namhan'gang

Namhan River (Korean: 남한강; lit. 'South Han River') is a major and second-longest river of South Korea. It is a tributary of the Han River. It is famous for clean and clear water, especially in its upper reaches and tributaries, and serves as a source of water for Seoul. A popular bike path follows the river. Several sections of it are used for public recreation, including rafting; some of these sections have their own traditional names, such as the "Donggang" or Dong River stretch, popular for natural beauty.

Some part of this river was found to be contaminated by bis-(2-ethylhexyl)-phthalate (DEHP) with 50 ppb.

== Gallery ==
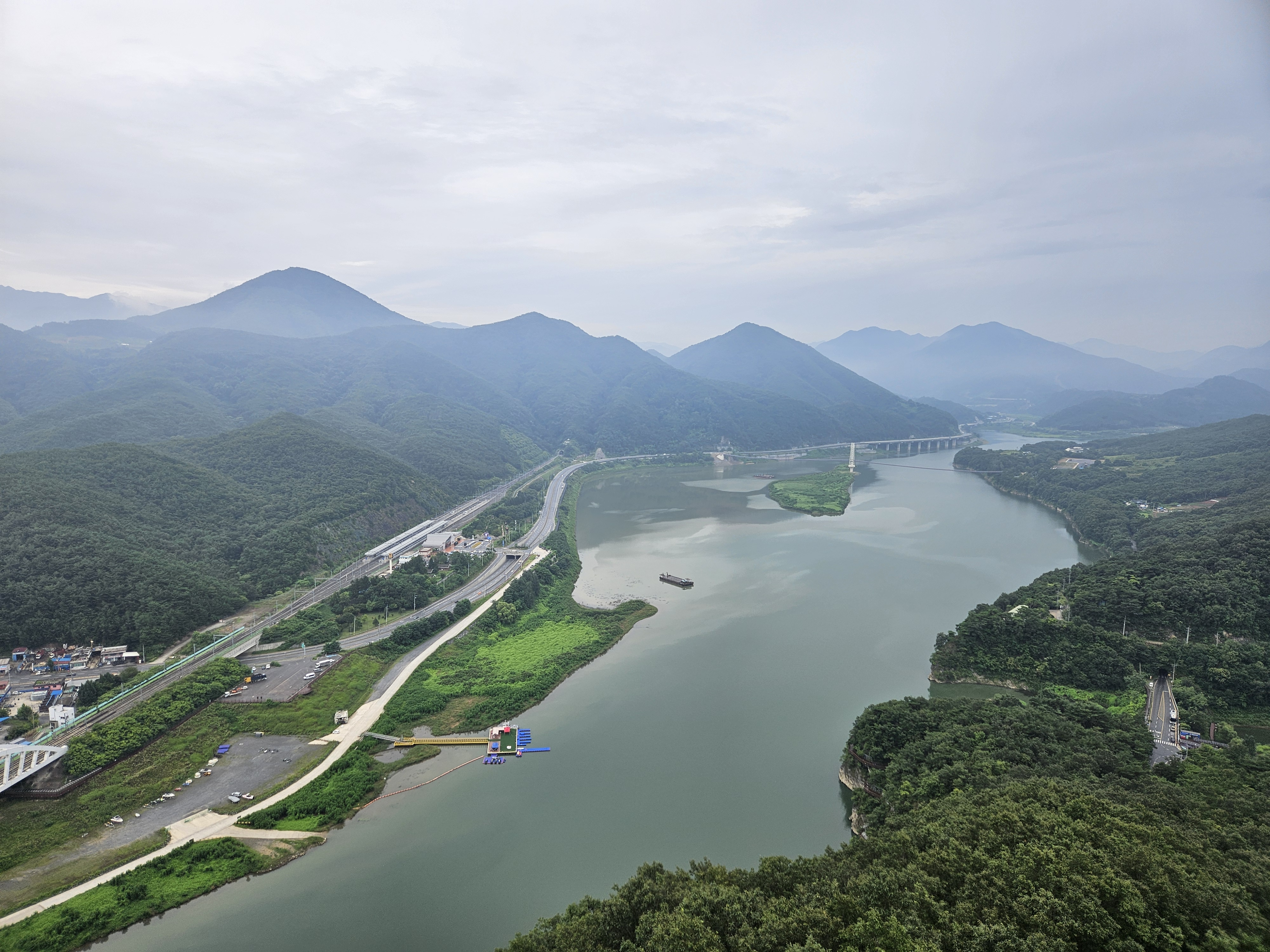
Namhan River in Danyang

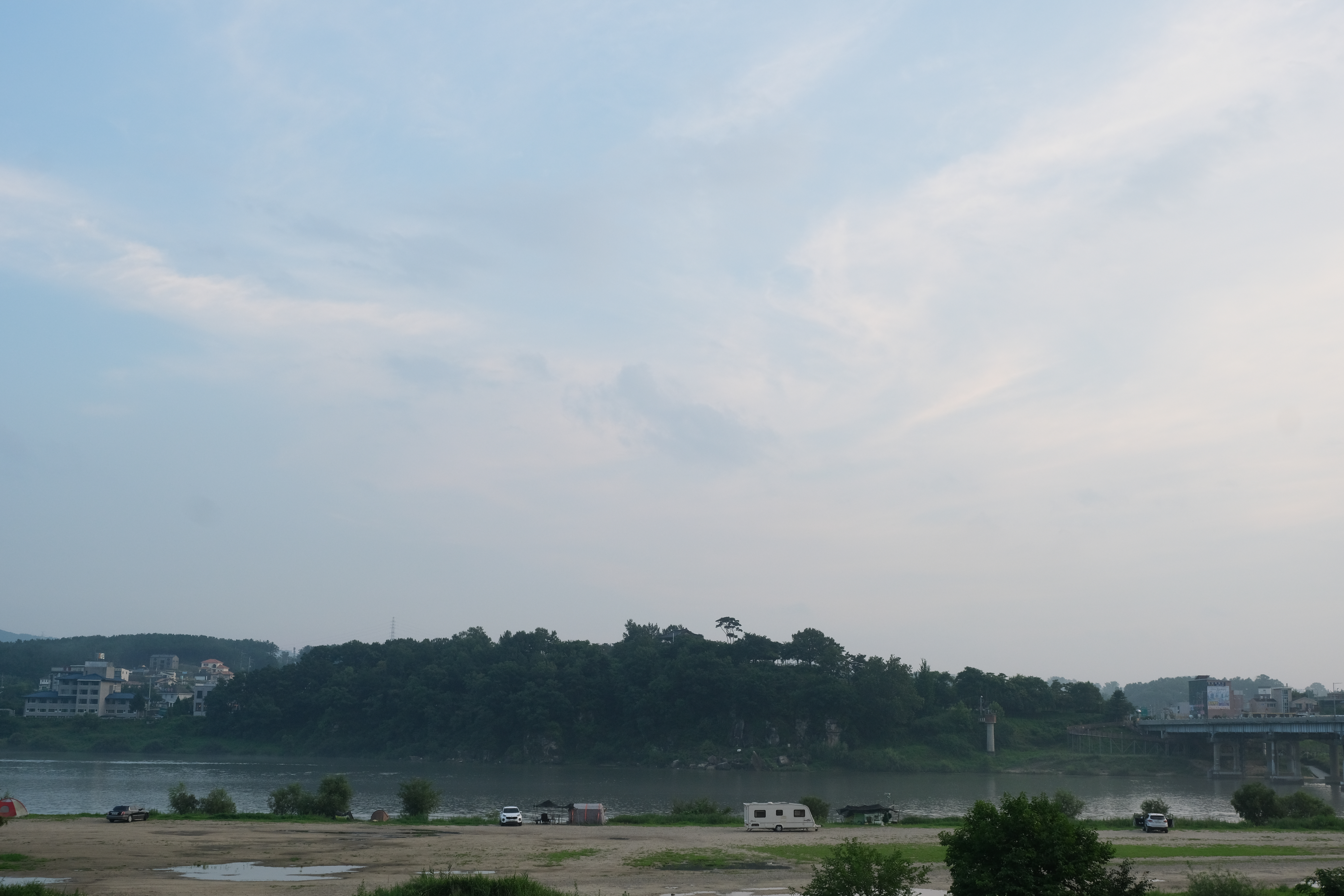
Namhan River in Yeoju

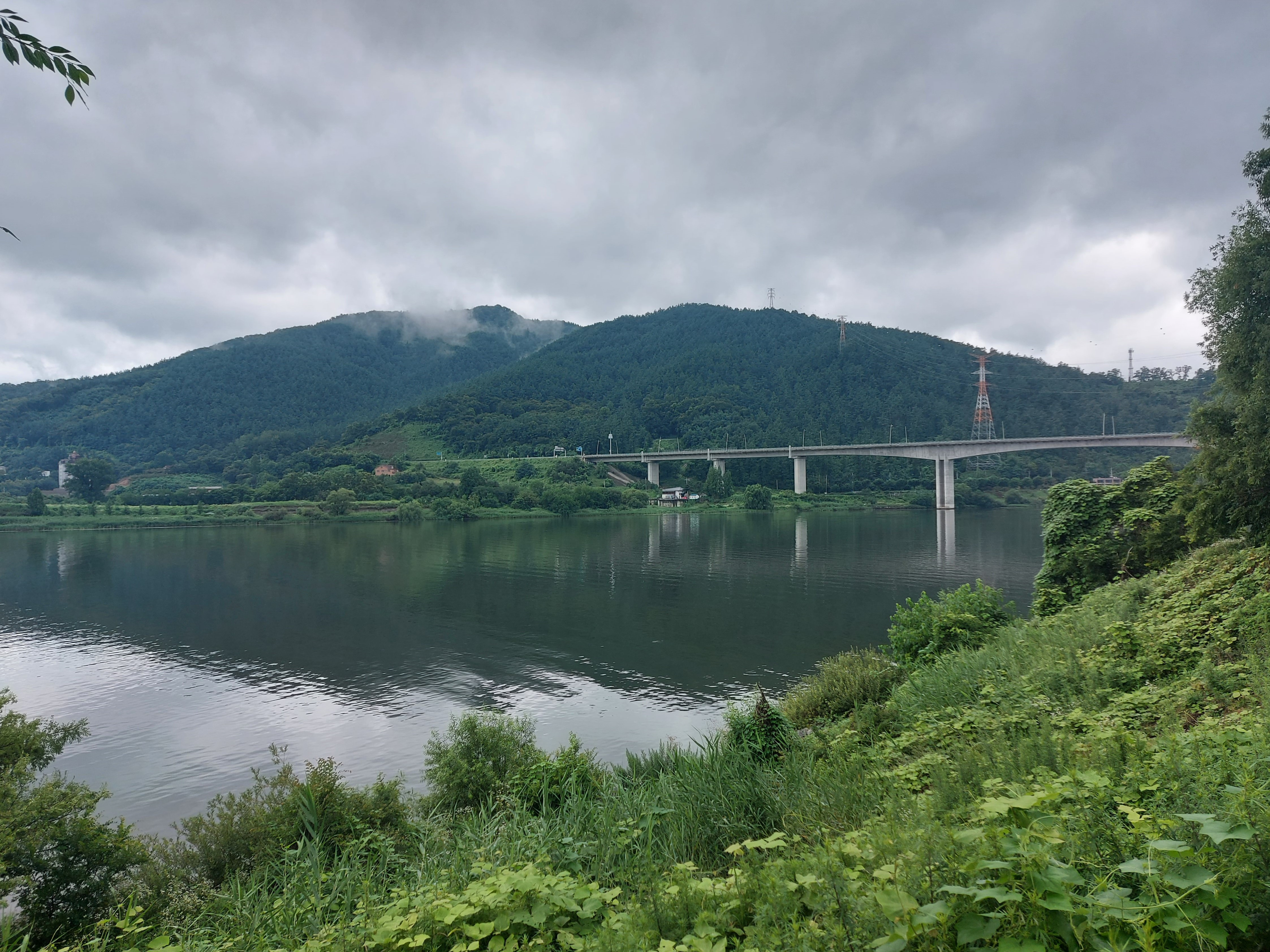
Namhan River in Yangpyeong County with Yangpyeong Bridge on National Route 45

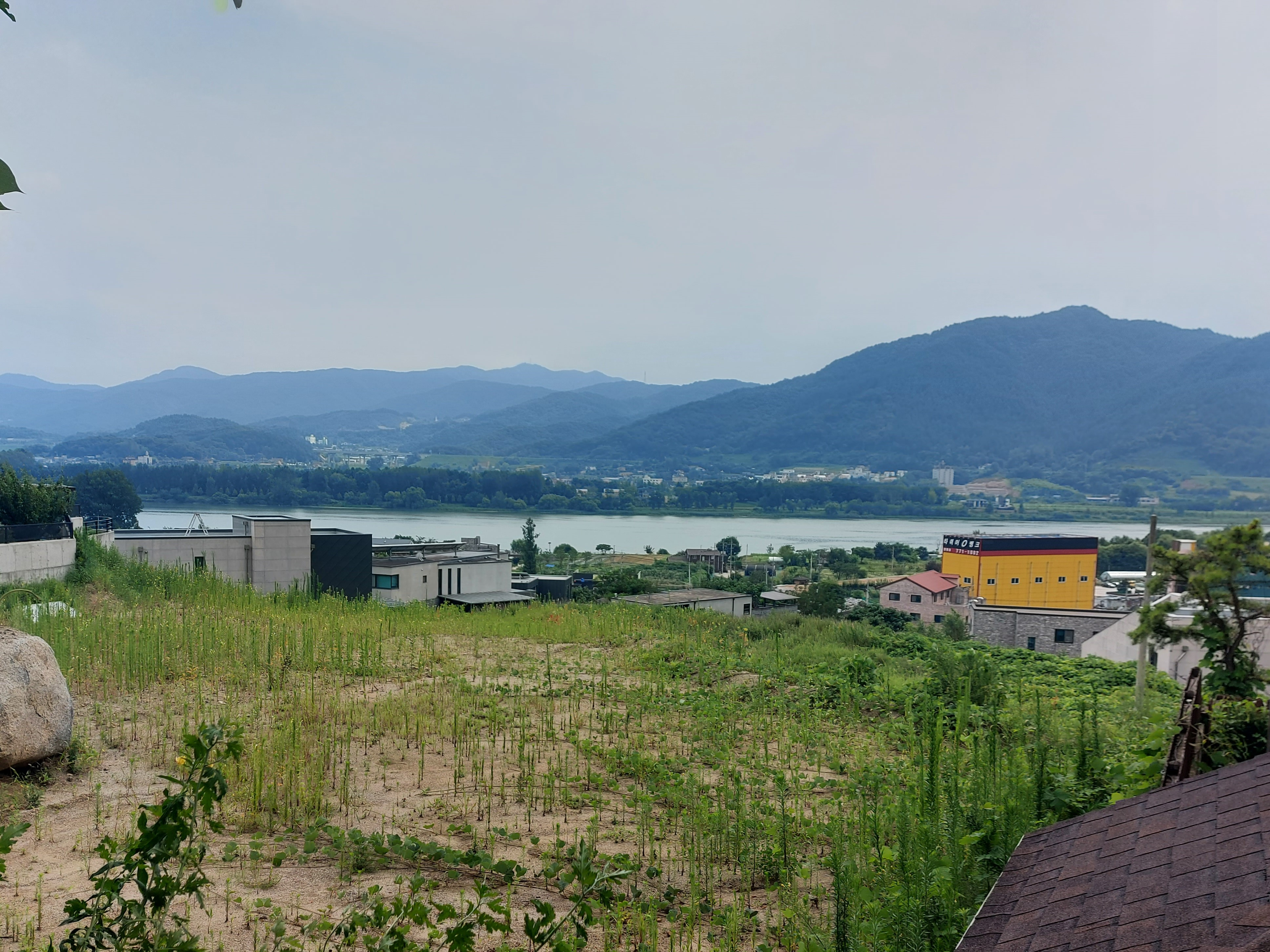
Namhan River in Yangpyeong County
