= Kimhwa County =

Coordinates: 38°24′43″N 127°35′46″E

Kimhwa County 김화군
- County

Korean transcription(s)
  - Chosŏn'gŭl: 김화군
  - Hancha: 金化郡
  - McCune-Reischauer: Kimhwa-gun
  - Revised Romanization: Gimhwa-gun
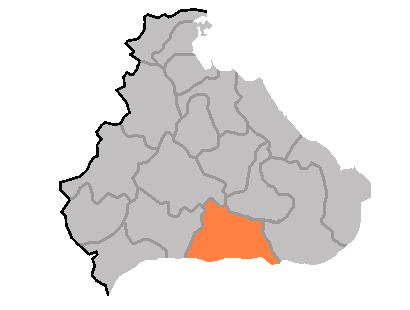
- Map of Kangwon showing the location of Kimhwa
- Country: North Korea
- Province: Kangwŏn Province
- Administrative divisions: 1 ŭp, 1 workers' districts, 13 ri

Area
  - Total: 580 km^{2} (220 sq mi)

Population (2008)
  - Total: 56,541
  - Density: 97/km^{2} (250/sq mi)

Kimhwa County is a kun, or county, in Kangwŏn province, North Korea.

== Geography ==
Kimhwa county is primarily mountainous, but the county's southeastern region is low-lying. The highest peak is Pae'gyŏnsan (백연산). The chief stream is the Pukhan River. Approximately 80% of the county's area is taken up by forestland.

== Administrative divisions ==
Kimhwa county is divided into 1 ŭp (town), 1 rodongjagu (workers' district) and 13 ri (villages):

- Kimhwa-ŭp (formerly Kŭmsŏngmyŏn)
- Hakpang-rodongjagu
- Ch'angdo-ri
- Ch'osŏ-ri
- Kubong-ri
- Ŏho-ri
- Pŏpsu-ri
- Ryonghyŏl-li
- Sangp'al-li
- Sinch'ang-ri
- Sinp'ung-ri
- Tanghyŏl-li
- Wŏnbung-ri
- Wŏndong-ri
- Wŏnnam-ri

== Economy ==
The chief local industry is agriculture. Local crops include potatoes, maize, rice, wheat, and barley. In addition, livestock and silkworms are raised, and orchards are cultivated. There are several mines, exploiting local deposits of manganese, gold, copper, talc, fluorite, barite, and anthracite.

== Transportation ==
Kimhwa is connected to the rest of North Korea by road.

== See also ==
- Geography of North Korea
- Administrative divisions of North Korea
