= Yeoju =

City in Gyeonggi, South Korea

Coordinates: 37°18′N 127°38′E

- Municipal city
- Panoramic view of Yeoju

- Flag

- Location in South Korea
- City: South Korea
- Region: Gyeonggi Province (Sudogwon)
- Administrative divisions: 8 eup, 3 myeon, 3 ri

Area
  - Total: 608.64 km^{2} (235.00 sq mi)

Population (September 2024)
  - Total: 114,750
  - Density: 188.8/km^{2} (489/sq mi)
  - Dialect: Seoul

Korean name
- Hangul: 여주시
- Hanja: 驪州市
- RR: Yeoju-si
- MR: Yŏju-si

Yeoju (Korean: 여주; Korean pronunciation: [jʌ.dʑu]) is a city in Gyeonggi Province, South Korea. Yeoju was a county but was raised to the status of a city in September 2013. Together with the neighboring city of Icheon, it is known as a major center of contemporary South Korean ceramics, and hosts the World Ceramic Exposition every year. Other local products of note include rice, sweet potatoes, and yellow melons. Yeoju is the birthplace of Korea's last queen, Empress Myeongseong.

Yeoju's institution of higher learning includes Yeoju Institute of Technology. The Jungbu Naeryuk Expressway passes through the city.

A city located in the easternmost part of the southeastern part of Gyeonggi Province. It is bordered by Wonju, Gangwon-do to the east, Icheon to the southwest, Gwangju to the west, Yangpyeong-gun to the north, and Chungju and Eumseong-gun of North Chungcheong Province to the south. On September 23, 2013, Yeoju-gun was promoted to Yeoju, and it is currently the most recently promoted city in the country.

== History ==
=== Early history ===
There have been human settlements in the Yeoju area since Paleolithic times. At the Heunam-ri archaeological site, just southeast of the city proper, fragments of herringbone patterned earthenware pottery, axe heads, and other artifacts have been discovered. Further excavations from research teams and accidental findings from construction in the area have continued to reveal the continued human presence through the Neolithic era up to the beginnings of recorded history.

After becoming Yeoju-gun in 1895 and staying in Wonju in 1924, Seomyeon was incorporated into Yeoju-gun. In 1941, Yeoju-myeon was promoted to Yeoju-eup, and Gaegun-myeon was incorporated into Yangpyeong-gun in 1963.

=== Three Kingdoms period and Goryeo dynasty ===
Due to its location on the Namhan River. Yeoju was a geographically strategic point for the rulers of the Silla kingdom. During the reign of King Pasa 5th ruler of Shilla from 80 to 112 AD, the mountain fortress of Pasaseong-ji was constructed just downriver from Yeoju on Pasa Mountain. The fortress continued to be used in later dynasties, until its importance faded due to the usage of Namhansanseong became more prevalent. The majority of the 1,800 meter long wall still stands today and can be accessed by hiking trails.

Yeoju is also home to Silleuksa, the only riverside Buddhist temple in Korea. Silleuksa was founded in 580 by the monk Wonhyo, one of the leading minds in Korean Buddhist tradition. It is home to a collection of 7 relics as well as a brick-constructed pagoda, one of only several in the country.

The ruins of Godal-Saji temple are all that remain of a temple complex that was originally constructed in 764 AD by King Gyeongdeok, 35th king of Unified Silla. During the early years of the Goryeo dynasty, the complex was frequented and supported by the ruling family but was later burned down during the Joseon dynasty. Currently there is little left but a few stone stupas and dragon-headed turtles scattered among the foundations. The intricate carvings in these structures, however, are a lasting example of the workmanship of early Goryeo artisans

=== Joseon dynasty ===
Yeoju continued to be an influence during the Joseon dynasty due to being a major agricultural producer of staple foods such as rice. Throughout the dynasty various laws were passed to increase the agricultural output and improve the quality of the rice which led to Yeoju, as well as its nearby neighbor Icheon becoming central to the industry. Some principal families became influential in Joseon politics, such as the Yeoheung Min clan and the Yeoheung Yi clan.

The tomb of Sejong the Great, the most influential king in Korean history, was moved to Yeoju from its former location in Seoul in 1469. The tomb continues to be one of the largest tourist attractions for the area.

In 1851, towards the end of the Joseon dynasty, Empress Myeongseong, the last empress of Korea, was born in Yeoju. Her birthplace, Gamgodang, was mostly destroyed during the Japanese occupation, but after the liberation of the country was restored in order to honor her resistance of Japanese rule.

Because Yeoju had been the birthplace of Empress Myeongseong, Yeoju and the surrounding countryside hosted activity by the Righteous Army in the years leading up to the Japanese occupation. Along with the presence of Righteous Army guerrilla fighters in the area, some local farmers offered their support of the resistance by providing rice and other foodstuffs.

== Climate ==
Yeoju has a monsoon-influenced humid continental climate (Köppen: Dwa) with cold, dry winters and hot, rainy summers.

Climate data for Yeoju (1993–2020 normals)
Month	Jan	Feb	Mar	Apr	May	Jun	Jul	Aug	Sep	Oct	Nov	Dec	Year
Mean daily maximum °C (°F)	2.0 (35.6)	5.5 (41.9)	12.2 (54.0)	19.5 (67.1)	24.9 (76.8)	28.2 (82.8)	29.6 (85.3)	30.3 (86.5)	26.0 (78.8)	20.0 (68.0)	11.7 (53.1)	3.7 (38.7)	17.8 (64.0)
Daily mean °C (°F)	−3.6 (25.5)	−0.8 (30.6)	5.1 (41.2)	11.8 (53.2)	17.9 (64.2)	22.2 (72.0)	24.8 (76.6)	25.1 (77.2)	19.9 (67.8)	12.9 (55.2)	5.5 (41.9)	−1.8 (28.8)	11.6 (52.9)
Mean daily minimum °C (°F)	−8.8 (16.2)	−6.2 (20.8)	−0.9 (30.4)	5.0 (41.0)	11.4 (52.5)	16.9 (62.4)	21.2 (70.2)	21.4 (70.5)	15.4 (59.7)	7.4 (45.3)	0.4 (32.7)	−6.5 (20.3)	6.4 (43.5)
Average precipitation mm (inches)	17.0 (0.67)	23.9 (0.94)	34.2 (1.35)	60.4 (2.38)	71.7 (2.82)	125.0 (4.92)	321.5 (12.66)	258.8 (10.19)	154.2 (6.07)	48.2 (1.90)	41.2 (1.62)	16.9 (0.67)	1,173 (46.18)
Average precipitation days (≥ 0.1 mm)	3.3	3.5	5.7	6.5	6.1	7.5	13.2	12.4	7.8	4.8	6.9	4.6	82.3
Source: Korea Meteorological Administration

== Special Products ==
Yeoju Rice - Yeoju, which has been considered a clean area since ancient times, is a famous rice producing area known for its delicious rice that was presented to the king.

- Spicy Fish Stew - Among the 100-ri Namhangang River that runs through Yeoju, the Yeoju River is deep, so freshwater fish such as carp and squid raised here are delicious. Among them, carp has been presented to the king since ancient times. There are many spicy fish stew restaurants around the Namhangang River, such as on the riverside road behind Yeoju County Office, in the Sinreuksa tourist area, Heungcheon-myeon, Geumsa-myeon, and Gangcheon-myeon.
- Yeoju Sweet Potato - It is called Yeoju Sweet Potato because it tastes like honey chestnuts. It is recognized as the best quality as a healthy and diet food.
- Yeoju Golden Melon - The golden melon, which has a unique fragrance and soft texture, is a representative specialty of Yeoju that has been famous for a long time.
- Yeoju Peanuts - Yeoju peanuts, grown as an organic natural food, are synonymous with the best-selling domestic peanuts in the country due to their superior taste and quality.

== See also ==
- Korean pottery
- Geography of South Korea
